= 2015 Buriram United F.C. season =

Buriram United
2015 season
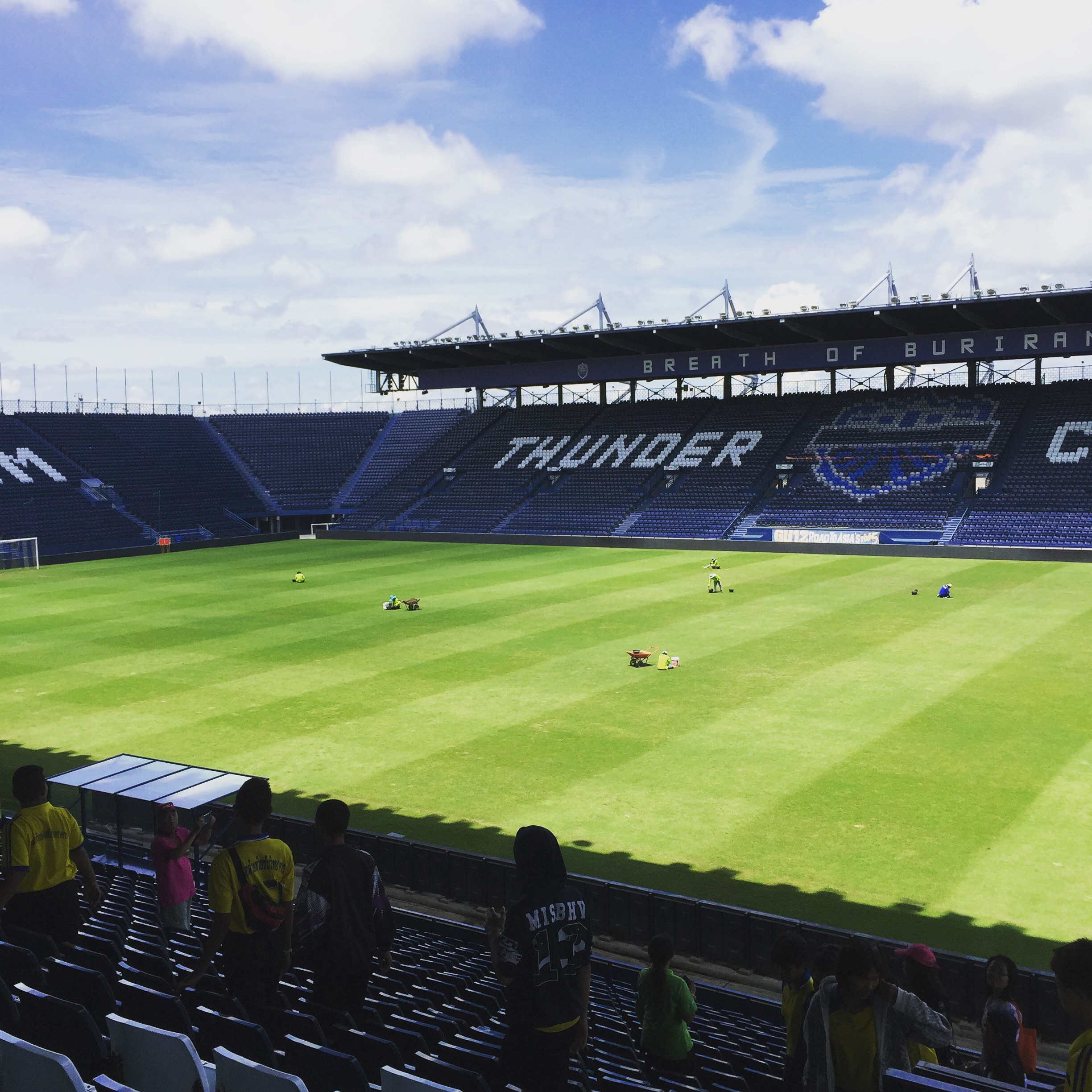
- I-Mobile Stadium in 2015
- Chairman: Newin Chidchob
- Manager: Alexandre Gama
- Stadium: I-Mobile Stadium
- Thai Premier League: 1st
- Thai FA Cup: Winners
- Thai League Cup: Winners
- Kor Royal Cup: Winners
- Mekong Club Championship: Winners
- AFC Champions League: Group Stage
- Top goalscorer: League: Diogo Luís Santo (33); All: Diogo Luís Santo (45)
Home colours	Away colours	Third colours

The 2015 season was Buriram United's fourth season in the Thai Premier League. The club entered the season as the TPL Champion, and participated in the Thai Premier League, FA Cup, League Cup, Kor Royal Cup and the AFC Champions League. The season covers the period from 20 December 2014 to 26 December 2015.

This is Buriram United's name changing.

- 1970-2009 as Provincial Electricity Authority Football Club (PEA)
- 2010-2011 as Buriram Provincial Electricity Authority Football Club (Buriram PEA)
- 2012–present as Buriram United Football Club (Buriram United)

== Players ==
=== Squad information, appearances and goals ===
No.	Pos.	Name	League		FA Cup		League Cup		Kor Royal Cup		Mekong		Asia		Total		Discipline	
No.	Pos.	Name	Apps	Goals	Apps	Goals	Apps	Goals	Apps	Goals	Apps	Goals	Apps	Goals	Apps	Goals	Yellow card	Red card
1	GK	(Thailand) Siwarak Tedsungnoen	34	0	6	0	5	0	1	0	1	0	6	0	53	0	2	0
2	DF	(Thailand) Theerathon Bunmathan	32	3	6	1	5(1)	0	1	0	0(1)	0	6	2	50(2)	6	3	0
3	DF	(Thailand) Kritprom Boonsarn	0(1)	0	0	0	0	0	0	0	0	0	0	0	0(1)	0	0	0
4	MF	(Thailand) Wanchalerm Yingyong	0(2)	0	0	0	1	0	0	0	0	0	0	0	1(2)	0	0	0
5	DF	(Venezuela) Andrés Túñez (vc)	27	9	4	4	6	3	1	0	1	1	6	1	45	18	8	0
7	MF	(South Korea) Ko Seul-Ki	31	8	6	2	7	1	1	0	1	0	6	1	52	12	14	1
8	MF	(Thailand) Suchao Nutnum (c)	28(4)	5	6	0	5(1)	0	1	0	1	0	6	0	47(5)	5	9	0
9	FW	(New Zealand) Kayne Vincent	0(3)	0	0	0	1	0	0(1)	0	0	0	0	0	1(4)	0	0	0
10	MF	(Thailand) Jakkraphan Kaewprom	24(1)	1	5	2	4(2)	2	0	0	1	0	2(1)	0	36(4)	5	8	0
11	FW	(Brazil) Rafael Coelho	0	0	1(2)	0	1(1)	3	0	0	0	0	0	0	2(3)	3	0	0
13	DF	(Thailand) Narubadin Weerawatnodom	19(10)	1	5(1)	0	5(2)	0	1	0	1	0	5	0	36(13)	1	5	0
14	DF	(Thailand) Chitipat Thanklang	19(3)	1	2	0	2	0	1	0	1	0	6	0	31(3)	1	5	0
15	MF	(Thailand) Surat Sukha	2(9)	0	0	0	2(1)	0	0	0	0	0	0(4)	0	4(14)	0	1	0
16	DF	(Thailand) Koravit Namwiset	32	4	6	1	5(1)	0	1	0	1	0	6	0	51(1)	5	5	0
17	MF	(Thailand) Anawin Jujeen	18(7)	3	1(3)	0	4(2)	0	0	0	0(1)	0	1(1)	0	24(14)	3	3	0
18	FW	(Thailand) Sittichok Kannoo	3(10)	1	1(1)	0	4(1)	1	0	0	0(1)	0	0	0	8(13)	2	3	0
19	MF	(Thailand) Naruphol Ar-Romsawa	6(3)	0	1	0	2(2)	0	1	0	0	0	0(2)	0	10(7)	0	1	0
20	FW	(Brazil) Jandson dos Santos	1(5)	4	0	0	4	2	0	0	0	0	0	0	5(5)	6	0	0
21	MF	(Thailand) Prakit Deeprom	8(5)	1	0(1)	0	2(2)	0	0(1)	0	0	0	4(1)	1	14(10)	2	1	0
22	FW	(Brazil) Gilberto Macena	30	21	5	1	1	0	1	0	1	0	6	3	44	25	1	0
23	MF	(Thailand) Santirad Weing-in	0(6)	0	0	0	1	0	0	0	0	0	0	0	1(6)	0	0	0
24	DF	(Thailand) Nukoolkit Krutyai	5(8)	0	0(1)	0	4(1)	0	0(1)	0	0	0	0	0	9(11)	0	3	0
25	DF	(Thailand) Suree Sukha	11(5)	0	4	0	4	0	0	0	0	0	0(4)	0	19(9)	0	8	0
26	GK	(Thailand) Yotsapon Teangdar	0	0	0	0	2	0	0	0	0	0	0	0	2	0	0	0
28	MF	(Thailand) Chaowat Veerachat	5(7)	0	0(4)	0	4(1)	1	0	0	0(1)	0	0	0	9(13)	1	1	0
29	MF	(Thailand) Nattawut Sombatyotha	0(1)	0	0	0	1(1)	1	0	0	0	0	0	0	1(2)	1	0	0
30	MF	(Thailand) Supachok Sarachat	2(3)	0	1(1)	0	0	0	0	0	0	0	0	0	3(4)	0	0	0
34	MF	(Thailand) Anon Amornlerdsak	3(4)	1	0(3)	0	0	0	0	0	1	0	0	0	4(7)	1	2	0
35	DF	(Thailand) Patipan Un-Op	2	1	1(1)	0	0	0	0	0	0	0	0	0	3(1)	1	3	0
39	GK	(Thailand) Kwanchai Suklom	0(1)	0	0	0	1	0	0	0	0	0	0	0	1(1)	0	0	0
40	FW	(Brazil) Diogo Luís Santo	32	33	5	3	5(1)	4	1	1	1	0	6	4	50(1)	45	15	1
—	—	Own goals	–	1	–	0	–	0	–	0	–	0	–	1	–	2	–	–

=== Top scorers ===
Rank	No.	Name	League	FA	LC	Kor	Mekong	AFC	Total
1	40	(Brazil) Diogo Luís Santo	33	3	4	1	0	4	45
2	22	(Brazil) Gilberto Macena	21	1	0	0	0	3	25
3	5	(Venezuela) Andrés Túñez	9	4	3	0	1	1	18
4	7	(South Korea) Ko Seul-Ki	8	2	1	0	0	1	12
5	2	(Thailand) Theerathon Bunmathan	3	1	0	0	0	2	6
5	20	(Brazil) Jandson dos Santos	4	0	2	0	0	0	6
7	8	(Thailand) Suchao Nutnum	5	0	0	0	0	0	5
7	10	(Thailand) Jakkraphan Kaewprom	1	2	2	0	0	0	5
7	16	(Thailand) Koravit Namwiset	4	1	0	0	0	0	5
10	11	(Brazil) Rafael Coelho	0	0	3	0	0	0	3
10	17	(Thailand) Anawin Jujeen	3	0	0	0	0	0	3
12	18	(Thailand) Sittichok Kannoo	1	0	1	0	0	0	2
12	21	(Thailand) Prakit Deeprom	1	0	0	0	0	1	2
14	13	(Thailand) Narubadin Weerawatnodom	1	0	0	0	0	0	1
14	14	(Thailand) Chitipat Thanklang	1	0	0	0	0	0	1
14	28	(Thailand) Chaowat Veerachat	0	0	1	0	0	0	1
14	29	(Thailand) Nattawut Sombatyotha	0	0	1	0	0	0	1
14	34	(Thailand) Anon Amornlerdsak	1	0	0	0	0	0	1
14	35	(Thailand) Patipan Un-Op	1	0	0	0	0	0	1

=== Transfers ===
First Thai footballer's market is opening on 6 November 2014 to 28 January 2015

Second Thai footballer's market is opening on 3 June 2015 to 30 June 2015

==== Transfers in ====
Date	Pos.	Name	From
6 November 2014	FW	(Brazil) Rafael Coelho	(China) Changchun Yatai
6 November 2014	DF	(Thailand) Narubadin Weerawatnodom	(Thailand) BEC Tero Sasana
6 November 2014	FW	(New Zealand) Kayne Vincent	(Thailand) Songkhla United
6 November 2014	MF	(Thailand) Wanchalerm Yingyong	(Thailand) Police United
6 November 2014	MF	(Thailand) Kritprom Boonsarn	(Thailand) Police United
6 November 2014	MF	(Thailand) Naruphol Ar-Romsawa	(Thailand) BEC Tero Sasana
6 November 2014	MF	(Thailand) Santirad Weing-in	(Thailand) Sisaket
6 November 2014	MF	(South Korea) Go Seul-ki	(Qatar) El Jaish
6 November 2014	DF	(Thailand) Itthiporn Theprian	(Thailand) Bangkok United
10 November 2014	MF	(Thailand) Baramee Limwatthana	(Thailand) Sriracha Banbueng
10 November 2014	MF	(Thailand) Sansern Limwatthana	(Thailand) Sriracha Banbueng
19 December 2014	MF	(Thailand) Prakit Deeprom	(Thailand) TOT
20 December 2014	DF	(Thailand) Nukoolkit Krutyai	(Thailand) BEC Tero Sasana
30 December 2014	FW	(Brazil) Diogo Luís Santo	(Brazil) Palmeiras
31 December 2014	FW	(Brazil) Gilberto Macena	(China) Hangzhou Greentown
19 January 2015	GK	(Thailand) Sittikorn Klamsai	(Thailand) Ratchawinit Bang Kaeo School
21 January 2015	DF	(Thailand) Korawit Namwiset	(Thailand) Bangkok United
24 June 2015	DF	(Thailand) Patipan Un-Op	(Thailand) Chonburi
24 June 2015	FW	(Brazil) Jandson dos Santos	(Saudi Arabia) Najran
26 June 2015	FW	(Bhutan) Chencho Gyeltshen	(Bhutan) Thimphu City
6 July 2015	FW	(Cameroon) Junior Atemengue	(Cameroon) Tonnerre Yaoundé
6 July 2015	DF	(Cameroon) Brice Jordan	Signed

==== Transfers out ====
Date	Pos.	Name	To
6 November 2014	FW	(Brazil) Lúcio Maranhão	(Brazil) Fortaleza
6 November 2014	FW	(South Korea) Kim Hyeung-bum	Released
6 November 2014	FW	(Thailand) Adisak Kraisorn	(Thailand) BEC Tero Sasana
6 November 2014	MF	(Thailand) Charyl Chappuis	(Thailand) Suphanburi
6 November 2014	MF	(Spain) Carmelo González	(Thailand) Suphanburi
30 November 2014	DF	(Thailand) Pratum Chuthong	(Thailand) Suphanburi
11 December 2014	DF	(Spain) Manuel Redondo	(Spain) Real Oviedo
25 December 2014	MF	(Thailand) August Gustafsson Lohaprasert	(Thailand) Army United
13 January 2015	FW	(Thailand) Kittiphong Pluemjai	(Thailand) Sukhothai
21 January 2015	FW	(Philippines) Javier Patiño	(China) Henan Jianye
22 January 2015	DF	(Thailand) Tanasak Srisai	(Thailand) BEC Tero Sasana
3 June 2015	DF	(Thailand) Kritprom Boonsarn	(Thailand) Ubon UMT United

==== Loans out ====
Date from	Date to	Pos.	Name	To
6 November 2014	31 December 2015	DF	(Thailand) Maxx Peter Creevey	(Thailand) Surin City
29 December 2014	31 December 2015	MF	(Thailand) Baramee Limwatthana	(Thailand) Surin City
29 December 2014	2 June 2015	MF	(Thailand) Sansern Limwatthana	(Thailand) Surin City
6 January 2015	25 July 2015	MF	(Thailand) Anon Amornlerdsak	(Thailand) Surin City
6 January 2015	31 December 2015	DF	(Thailand) Itthiporn Theprian	(Thailand) Surin City
6 January 2015	31 December 2015	FW	(Thailand) Amares Amornlerdsak	(Thailand) Surin City
12 January 2015	2 June 2015	DF	(Thailand) Nitipong Selanon	(Thailand) Gulf Saraburi
19 January 2015	31 December 2015	GK	(Thailand) Sittikorn Klamsai	(Thailand) Surin City
3 June 2015	31 December 2015	DF	(Thailand) Nitipong Selanon	(Thailand) Port MTI
3 June 2015	31 December 2015	FW	(New Zealand) Kayne Vincent	(Thailand) Port MTI
3 June 2015	31 December 2015	DF	(Spain) David Rochela	(Thailand) Port MTI
3 June 2015	31 December 2015	MF	(Thailand) Sansern Limwatthana	(Thailand) Phichit
3 June 2015	31 December 2015	GK	(Thailand) Yotsapon Teangdar	(Thailand) Phichit
2 July 2015	31 December 2015	MF	(Thailand) Nattawut Sombatyotha	(Thailand) Navy
6 July 2015	31 December 2015	FW	(Bhutan) Chencho Gyeltshen	(Thailand) Surin City
6 July 2015	31 December 2015	FW	(Cameroon) Junior Atemengue	(Thailand) Surin City
6 July 2015	31 December 2015	DF	(Cameroon) Brice Jordan	(Thailand) Surin City
7 July 2015	31 December 2015	MF	(Thailand) Wanchalerm Yingyong	(Thailand) Chainat Hornbill

== Non-competitive ==
=== Pre-season and friendlies ===
Win Draw Loss

Date	Opponents	H / A	Result F–A	Scorer(s)
20 December 2014	Pattani	A	1–0	Nitipong 53'
24 December 2014	Gulf Saraburi	H	0–1	
10 January 2015	(China) Shanghai Shenxin	H	1–1	Túñez 23'
17 January 2015	Chainat Hornbill	H	0–2	
26 January 2015	Ang Thong	A	1–1	Santirad 4'
29 January 2015	Thailand	H	1–0; Highlight	Macena 41'
1 February 2015	Sisaket	H	2–1	Vincent 64', * Chencho 86'
7 February 2015	Phichit	H	4–0	Vincent 15', Diogo (2) 50', 90+1', Theerathon 59'
20 May 2015	Laos	H	7–0	Seul-Ki 20', Macena 30', Diogo 34', Sittichok (3) 61', 64', 76', Santirad 90+3'
6 June 2015	PTT Rayong	H	1–0	Jandson 46'
13 June 2015	Sisaket	A	2–2	Diogo 56', Sittichok 72'
7 October 2015	Khonkaen United	H	4–3	Jandson (3) 8', 35', 57', Suree 21'
7 November 2015	Prachuap	A	3–2	Túñez 25' (pen.), Jandson 42', Narubadin 90+2'

Note 1: * Chencho is a football ambassador from Bhutan, not a Buriram United player

== Competitions ==
=== Overview ===

2015 Thai FA Cup Final starting lineup Buriram United 3 - 1 Muangthong United

Competition	Record							
Competition	G	W	D	L	GF	GA	GD	Win %
Thai Premier League	34	25	9	0	98	24	+74	73.53
Kor Royal Cup	1	1	0	0	1	0	+1	100.00
FA Cup	6	6	0	0	14	2	+12	100.00
League Cup	8	6	2	0	22	7	+15	75.00
Champions League	6	3	1	2	12	7	+5	50.00
Mekong Club Championship	1	1	0	0	1	0	+1	100.00
Total	56	42	12	2	148	40	+108	75.00

Updated to match played 26 December 2015
Source: Competitions

=== Kor Royal Cup ===
It's a match between the 2014 Toyota Thai Premier League's champions (Buriram United) and the 2014 Thaicom FA Cup's champions (Bangkok Glass). The match was held at Suphachalasai Stadium, Bangkok.

Win Draw Loss

24 January 2015 Royal Cup	Buriram United	1–0	Bangkok Glass	Bangkok
	Diogo 57'	Report		Stadium: National Stadium; Attendance: Unknown; Referee: Unknown

=== Thai Premier League ===
==== League table ====
Pos	Team	Pld	W	D	L	GF	GA	GD	Pts	Qualification or relegation
1	Buriram United (C, Q)	34	25	9	0	98	24	+74	84	2016 AFC Champions League group stage
2	Muangthong United (Q)	34	21	8	5	81	35	+46	71	2016 AFC Champions League Qualifying play-off (Note: The winners of the 2015 Thai FA Cup will also qualify for the play-off of the 2016 AFC Champions League. Since the FA Cup winners have already qualified to ACL through the championship and runners-up - because the Thai FA Cup Final is between Buriram and Muangthong - the spot will be awarded to the third-placed team.)
3	Suphanburi	34	16	11	7	60	39	+21	59	
4	Chonburi (Q)	34	15	12	7	62	44	+18	57 (Note: CHO 1–0 BKU; BKU 1–1 CHO)	2016 AFC Champions League Qualifying play-off
5	Bangkok United	34	16	9	9	59	47	+12	57	

Updated to match(es) played on 13 December 2015. Source: Thai Premier League
Rules for classification: 1) points; 2) head-to-head points; 3) head-to-head goal difference; 4) goal difference; 5) number of goals scored
(C) Champions; (Q) Qualified for the phase indicated

==== Results summary ====
Overall								Home						Away					
Pld	W	D	L	GF	GA	GD	Pts	W	D	L	GF	GA	GD	W	D	L	GF	GA	GD
34	25	9	0	98	24	+74	84	11	6	0	54	8	+46	14	3	0	44	16	+28

==== Results by opponent ====
Opposition	Home score	Away score	Double
Army United	0–0	4–1	No
Bangkok Glass	0–0	3–1	No
Bangkok United	6–1	3–0	Yes
BEC Tero Sasana	3–3	1–1	No
Chainat Hornbill	7–0	3–1	Yes
Chiangrai United	6–0	1–0	Yes
Chonburi	1–1	2–1	No
Muangthong United	2–2	1–1	No
Nakhon Ratchasima	4–0	1–1	No
Navy	3–0	3–1	Yes
Osotspa Samut Prakan	2–1	6–3	Yes
Port	2–0	5–1	Yes
Ratchaburi	5–0	2–1	Yes
Saraburi	6–0	2–1	Yes
Sisaket	1–0	1–0	Yes
Suphanburi	1–0	2–2	No
TOT	5–0	4–0	Yes

==== Matches ====
Win Draw Loss

Date	Opponents	H / A	Result F–A	Scorers	League position
14 February 2015	Port MTI	H	2–0; Highlight	Macena (2) 40', 44'	2nd
21 February 2015	SCG Muangthong United	A	1–1; Highlight	Diogo 65'	4th
7 March 2015	Suphanburi	A	2–2; Highlight	Diogo 28', Macena 80'	7th
11 March 2015	Chonburi	H	1–1; Highlight	Prakit 65'	9th
22 March 2015	Sisaket	H	1–0; Highlight	Diogo 83'	6th
3 April 2015	Chiangrai United	A	1–0; Highlight	Theerathon 45+2'	4th
26 April 2015	Navy	H	3–0; Highlight	Diogo (2) 25', 73', Seul-Ki 71' (pen.)	2nd
29 April 2015	Chainat Hornbill	A	3–1; Highlight	Túñez 6', Diogo (2) 21', 41'	1st
2 May 2015	Bangkok United	H	6–1; Highlight	Diogo 5', Macena (3) 56', 64', 81', Anawin 58', Seul-Ki 76'	1st
10 May 2015	TOT	A	4–0; Highlight	Diogo (2) 45' (pen.), 71', Theerathon 53', Macena 86'	1st
20 June 2015	Army United	H	0–0; Highlight		1st
27 June 2015	Ratchaburi Mitr Phol	A	2–1; Highlight	Diogo (2) 12', 85'	1st
4 July 2015	Osotspa M-150	H	2–1; Highlight	Túñez 45+4' (pen.), Macena 76'	1st
11 July 2015	Nakhon Ratchasima Mazda	A	1–1; Highlight	Sittichok 77'	1st
15 July 2015	Bangkok Glass	H	0–0; Highlight		1st
18 July 2015	Gulf Saraburi	A	2–1; Highlight	Jakkraphan 38', Diogo 39'	1st
26 July 2015	BEC Tero Sasana	H	3–3; Highlight	Koravit 66', Diogo (2) 78', 90+3'	1st
1 August 2015	SCG Muangthong United	H	2–2; Highlight	Thitipan 60' (o.g.), Diogo 77'	1st
9 August 2015	Sisaket	A	1–0; Highlight	Patipan 29'	1st
15 August 2015	Suphanburi	H	1–0; Highlight	Macena 37'	2nd
19 August 2015	Chonburi	A	2–1; Highlight	Seul-Ki 31', Diogo 68'	2nd
13 September 2015	Navy	A	3–1; Highlight	Diogo 37', Suchao 66', Macena 72'	2nd
19 September 2015	Chainat Hornbill	H	7–0; Highlight	Koravit 19', Suchao 41', Macena (3) 60', 66', 85', Diogo 64', Seul-Ki 80'	2nd
26 September 2015	Bangkok United	A	3–0; Highlight	Theerathon 64', Macena 66', Jandson 90+2'	2nd
18 October 2015	TOT	H	5–0; Highlight	Túñez (2) 35' (pen.), 87', Chitipat 45+1', Jandson 55', Macena 68'	2nd
24 October 2015	Army United	A	4–1; Highlight	Túñez 6' (pen.), Seul-Ki 25', Diogo (2) 27', 70'	1st
28 October 2015	Ratchaburi Mitr Phol	H	5–0; Highlight	Suchao (2) 33', 64', Túñez 73' (pen.), Jandson 87', Anawin 88'	1st
31 October 2015	Osotspa M-150 Samut Prakan	A	6–3; Highlight	Koravit 14', Macena 24', Diogo (3) 34', 45+2', 56', Narubadin 43'	1st
15 November 2015	Chiangrai United	H	6–0; Highlight	Suchao 40', Diogo (3) 49', 54', 63', Jandson 66', Macena 82'	1st
25 November 2015	Nakhon Ratchasima Mazda	H	4–0; Highlight	Seul-Ki 13', Túñez 52', Diogo (2) 61', 79'	1st
28 November 2015	Bangkok Glass	A	3–1; Highlight	Koravit 5', Seul-Ki 45+3', Túñez 56'	1st
6 December 2015	Saraburi	H	6–0; Highlight	Macena 35', Seul-Ki 41', Diogo (3) 58', 60', 76', Anon 90+2'	1st
9 December 2015	BEC Tero Sasana	A	1–1; Highlight	Túñez 80'	1st
13 December 2015	Port	A	5–1; Highlight	Macena (3) 30', 62', 72', Diogo 32', Anawin 40'	1st

=== Thai FA Cup ===
Win Draw Loss

24 June 2015 Second Round	Buriram United	3–0	Bangkok United	Buriram
	Diogo 102'; Macena 115'; Theerathon 117'	Report; Highlight		Stadium: New I-Mobile Stadium

29 July 2015 Third Round	Buriram United	2–0	Nakhon Ratchasima Mazda	Buriram
	Diogo 37'; Seul-Ki 51'	Report; Highlight		Stadium: New I-Mobile Stadium

12 August 2015 Fourth Round	Bangkok Glass	1–3	Buriram United	Pathum Thani
	Narit Taweekul 32' (o.g.); Aridane Santana 80'	Report; Highlight	Jakkaphan Kaewprom 49'; Andrés Túñez 59'	Stadium: Leo Stadium

23 September 2015 Quarter-finals	Chonburi	0–1	Buriram United	Chon Buri
		Report; Highlight	Koravit 61'	Stadium: Chon Buri Stadium

2 December 2015 Semi-finals	Buriram United	2–0	Chainat Hornbill	Bangkok
	Andrés Túñez 89', 90+5' (pen.)	Report; Highlight		Stadium: Rajamangala Stadium

26 December 2015 Final	Buriram United	3–1	SCG Muangthong United	Bangkok
	Túñez 45+1' (pen.); Seul-Ki 51'; Jakkraphan 71'	Report; Highlight	Mario Gjurovski 81'	Stadium: Supachalasai Stadium; Referee: Masaaki Toma (Japan)

=== Thai League Cup ===
Win Draw Loss

Date	Opponents	H / A	Result F–A	Scorers	Round
17 April 2015	Royal Thai Army	A	1–0; Highlight	Túñez 72'	Round of 64
1 July 2015	Ang Thong	A	4–0	Chaowat 32', Diogo (2) 42', 43', Nattawut 62'	Round of 32
22 July 2015	Bangkok Glass	A	0–0 (a.e.t.) (4–2p); Highlight		Round of 16
5 August 2015	Lamphun Warrior	A	0–0; Highlight		Quarter-finals 1st leg
16 September 2015	Lamphun Warrior	H	7–1; Highlight	Sittichok 4', Diogo 9', Rafael (3) 45+3', 49', 77', Jakkraphan 59', Túñez 61' (pen.)	Quarter-finals 2nd leg
30 September 2015	Army United	H	3–2; Highlight	Jandson (2) 9', 36', Jakkraphan 70'	Semi-finals 1st leg
21 October 2015	Army United	A	2–2; Highlight	Túñez 37', Diogo 81'	Semi-finals 2nd leg
21 November 2015	Sisaket	N	1–0; Highlight	Seul-Ki 18'	Final

=== Mekong Club Championship ===
Win Draw Loss

Date	Opponents	H / A	Result F–A	Scorers	Round
20 December 2015	(Cambodia) Boeung Ket Angkor	N	1–0; Highlight	Túñez 67' (pen.)	Final

=== AFC Champions League ===
==== Group stage ====
Pos	Team	Pld	W	D	L	GF	GA	GD	Pts	Qualification
1	(Japan) Gamba Osaka	6	3	1	2	10	7	+3	10	Advance to knockout stage
2	(South Korea) Seongnam FC	6	3	1	2	7	5	+2	10	Advance to knockout stage
3	(Thailand) Buriram United	6	3	1	2	12	7	+5	10	
4	(China) Guangzhou R&F	6	1	1	4	3	13	−10	4	

Source: AFC
Rules for classification: Group stage tiebreakers

Buriram United was staying on group F, with Gamba Osaka from Japan, Seongnam from South Korea and Guangzhou R&F from China.

Win Draw Loss

Date	Opponents	H / A	Result F–A	Scorers	Round
24 February 2015	(South Korea) Seongnam	H	2–1; Highlight	Prakit 17', Macena 19'	Group F, Match Day 1
3 March 2015	(China) Guangzhou R&F	A	2–1; Highlight	Seul-Ki 43', Macena 90'	Group F, Match Day 2
18 March 2015	(Japan) Gamba Osaka	A	1–1; Highlight	Theerathon 62'	Group F, Match Day 3
7 April 2015	(Japan) Gamba Osaka	H	1–2; Highlight	Theerathon 8'	Group F, Match Day 4
22 April 2015	(South Korea) Seongnam	A	1–2; Highlight	Diogo 77'	Group F, Match Day 5
6 May 2015	(China) Guangzhou R&F	H	5–0; Highlight	Diogo (3) 12', 38', 56', Túñez 36', Macena 60'	Group F, Match Day 6

== See also ==
- List of unbeaten football club seasons
