= 2015 Thai FA Cup final =

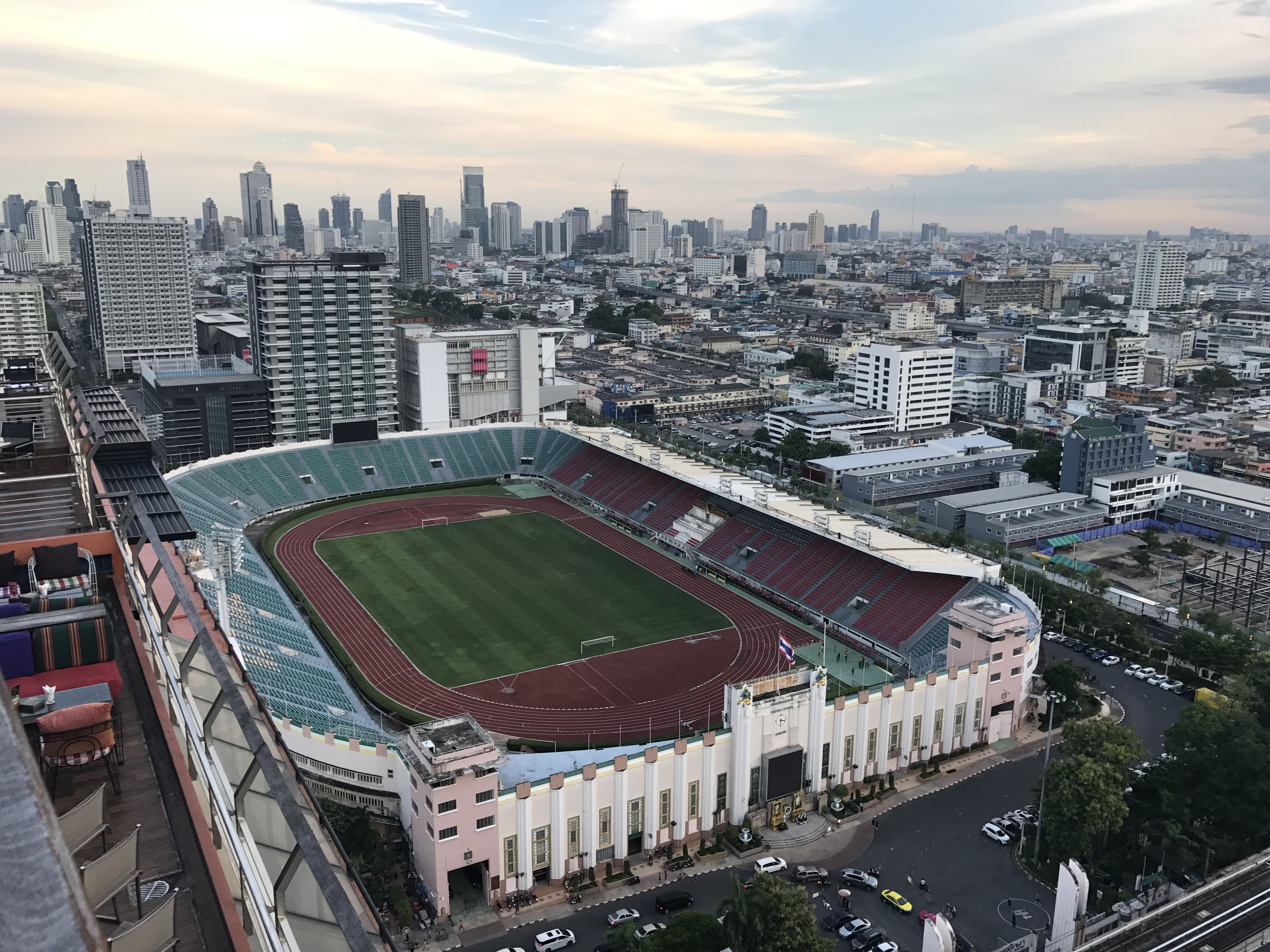
- The match took place at Supachalasai Stadium.
- Event: 2015 Thai FA Cup
SCG Muangthong United	Buriram United
1	3
- Date: 26 December 2015
- Venue: Supachalasai Stadium, Bangkok
- Man of the Match: Go Seul-ki
- Referee: Masaaki Toma (Japan)

The 2015 Thai FA Cup final was the final match of the 2015 Thai FA Cup, the 22nd season of a Thailand's football tournament organised by Football Association of Thailand. It was played at the Supachalasai Stadium in Bangkok, Thailand on 26 December 2015, between SCG Muangthong United a big team from the metropolitan region and Buriram United a big team from the northeastern region of Thailand.

== Road to the final ==
In their semi-finals, SCG Muangthong United beat Army United 2–1. In the same way, Buriram United beat Chainat Hornbill 2–0 and qualified to the final.

SCG Muangthong United (TPL)		Round	Buriram United (TPL)	
Opponent	Result	Knockout 1 leg	Opponent	Result
Khon Kaen United (D2)	2–0 (A)	Round of 64	Bangkok United (TPL)	3–0 (a.e.t.) (H)
Siam Navy (TPL)	3–1 (H)	Round of 32	Nakhon Ratchasima (TPL)	2–0 (H)
Osotspa (TPL)	1–0 (H)	Round of 16	Bangkok Glass (TPL)	3–1 (A)
Chiangrai United (TPL)	1–0 (H)	Quarter-finals	Chonburi (TPL)	1–0 (A)
Army United (TPL)	2–1 (N)	Semi-finals	Chainat Hornbill (TPL)	2–0 (N)

Note: In all results below, the score of the finalist is given first (H: home; A: away; TPL: Clubs from Thai Premier League; D1: Clubs from Thai Division 1 League; D2: Clubs from Regional League Division 2).

== Match ==
=== Details ===
26 December 2015
18:30 UTC+7

SCG Muangthong United	1–3	Buriram United
Mario 81'	Report	Túñez 45' (pen.); Seul-ki 51'; Jakkaphan 71'

Supachalasai Stadium, Bangkok
Referee: Masaaki Toma (Japan)

SCG Muangthong United	Burriam United

Lineups:
GK	1	(Thailand) Kawin Thammasatchanan
DF	4	(Thailand) Piyaphon Phanichakul
DF	5	(Japan) Naoaki Aoyama
DF	8	(Thailand) Atit Daosawang
DF	6	(South Korea) Kim Dong-Jin
MF	24	(Thailand) Kasidech Wettayawong				(substituted off) 82'
MF	25	(Thailand) Thitipan Puangchan		(yellow card) 86'
MF	15	(Thailand) Seksit Srisai				(substituted off) 64'
MF	20	(North Macedonia) Mario Gjurovski	81'	(yellow card) 75'	(yellow card) 90' (red card)
FW	10	(Thailand) Teerasil Dangda (c)
FW	23	(Brazil) Cleiton Silva
Substitutes:
GK	39	(Thailand) Witsanusak Kaewruang
MF	7	(Thailand) Datsakorn Thonglao
MF	21	(Thailand) Phitiwat Sukjitthammakul
FW	22	(Thailand) Chananan Pombuppha				(substituted on) 64'
DF	26	(Thailand) Suphan Thongsong
DF	27	(Thailand) Sarawut Kanlayanabandit
DF	28	(Thailand) Suriya Singmui
DF	37	(Thailand) Suporn Peenagatapho				(substituted on) 82'
FW	40	(Thailand) Patipan Pinsermsootsri
Manager:
(Croatia) Dragan Talajić

Lineups:
GK	1	(Thailand) Sivaruck Tedsungnoen
DF	25	(Thailand) Suree Sukha
DF	5	(Venezuela) Andrés Túñez	45' (pen.)
DF	16	(Thailand) Koravit Namwiset
MF	17	(Thailand) Anawin Jujeen		(yellow card) 42'	(substituted off) 73'
MF	10	(Thailand) Jakkaphan Kaewprom	71'
MF	7	(South Korea) Go Seul-ki	51'		(substituted off) 76'
MF	8	(Thailand) Suchao Nutnum (c)
MF	2	(Thailand) Theeraton Bunmathan
FW	40	(Brazil) Diogo Luís Santo			(substituted off) 94'
FW	22	(Brazil) Gilberto Macena
Substitutes:
GK	39	(Thailand) Sornchai Suklom
DF	13	(Thailand) Narubadin Weerawatnodom			(substituted on) 73'
DF	14	(Thailand) Chitipat Tanklang
MF	15	(Thailand) Surat Sukha
FW	18	(Thailand) Sittichok Kannoo
DF	24	(Thailand) Nukoolkit Krutyai
MF	28	(Thailand) Chaowat Veerachat		(yellow card) 89'	(substituted on) 76'
MF	34	(Thailand) Anon Amornlerdsak			(substituted on) 94'
DF	35	(Thailand) Patipan Un-Op
Manager:
(Brazil) Alexandre Gama

Assistant referees:
Haruhiro Otsuka (Japan)
Ryo Hirama (Japan)
Fourth official:
Sivakorn Pu-udom (Thailand)

MATCH RULES

- 90 minutes.
- 30 minutes of extra-time if necessary.
- Penalty shootout if scores still level.
- Nine named substitutes
- Maximum of 3 substitutions.
