= Santirad Weing-in =

Thai footballer (born 1989)

Personal information
- Full name: Santirad Weing-in
- Date of birth: October 12, 1989 (age 37)
- Place of birth: Nakhon Phanom, Thailand
- Height: 1.74 m (5 ft 8 1/2 in)
- Positions: Winger; left back

Team information
- Current team: Esan Fighter
- Number: 8

Youth career
- 2011: Nakhon Phanom

Senior career*
Years	Team	Apps	(Gls)
2011–2013	Nakhon Phanom	29	(12)
2014	Sisaket	31	(6)
2015	Buriram United	3	(0)
2016	PTT Rayong	7	(2)
2016	Sukhothai	2	(0)
2017	Yasothon	23	(2)
2018	Khon Kaen	18	(1)
2019	Ayutthaya United	10	(0)
2020	Kirivong Sok Sen Chey	16	(4)
2020–2021	Muangkan United	0	(0)
2021	Ubon Kruanapat	0	(0)
2024–2025	Roi Et PB United	35	(5)
2025–2026	Udon Banjan United	9	(0)
2026–	Esan Fighter	0	(0)
- * Club domestic league appearances and goals

Santirad Weing-in (Thai: สันติราษฎร์ เวียงอินทร์) is a Thai professional footballer who played for Esan Fighter.

== Honours ==
=== Club ===
Buriram United

- Thai League 1 (1): 2015
- Thai FA Cup (1): 2015
- Thai League Cup (1): 2015
- Kor Royal Cup (1): 2015
- Mekong Club Championship (1): 2015
