= Patipan Un-op =

Thai footballer (born 1995)

Patipan Un-Op
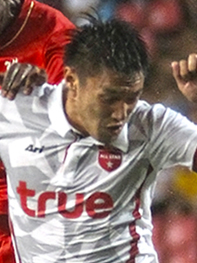

Personal information
- Full name: Patipan Un-Op
- Date of birth: 8 October 1995 (age 31)
- Place of birth: Prachuap Khiri Khan, Thailand
- Height: 1.83 m (6 ft 0 in)
- Position: Centre back

Team information
- Current team: Sukhothai

Youth career
- 2012–2013: Chonburi

Senior career*
Years	Team	Apps	(Gls)
2014–2015	Chonburi	0	(0)
2015	→ TOT (loan)	9	(0)
2015–2017	Buriram United	2	(1)
2016	→ Navy (loan)	0	(0)
2016	→ Suphanburi (loan)	0	(0)
2017	Thai Honda Ladkrabang	9	(0)
2017–2018	PTT Rayong	39	(1)
2018–2019	Chiangmai	3	(0)
2020–2021	Muangkan United	8	(0)
2021–	Sukhothai	0	(0)

International career^{‡}
2014	Thailand U19		
- * Club domestic league appearances and goals as of 10 August 2015 ‡ National team caps and goals as of 10 August 2015

Patipan Un-Op (Thai: ปฏิภาณ อุ่นอบ, born October 8, 1995) is a Thai professional footballer who plays as a defender for Thai League 2 club Sukhothai.

== International career ==
Patipan was part of Thailand U19's squad in the 2014 Hassanal Bolkiah Trophy.

== Honours ==
Buriram United

- Thai League 1: 2015
- Thai FA Cup: 2015
- Thai League Cup: 2015
- Mekong Club Championship: 2015
