= Chaowat Veerachat =

Thai footballer (born 1996)

Personal information
- Full name: Chaowat Veerachat
- Date of birth: 23 June 1996 (age 30)
- Place of birth: Chiang Mai, Thailand
- Height: 1.71 m (5 ft 7 in)
- Position: Midfielder

Team information
- Current team: Chonburi

Youth career
- 2003–2010: Montfort College
- 2011–2013: Buriram United

Senior career*
Years	Team	Apps	(Gls)
2014–2016	Buriram United	31	(1)
2014	→ Surin City (loan)	16	(2)
2017–2026	BG Pathum United	147	(12)
2018	→ Cerezo Osaka U-23 (loan)	14	(0)
2022	→ Cerezo Osaka (loan)	0	(0)
2025	→ Chonburi (loan)	15	(2)
2025–2026	→ PT Prachuap (loan)	23	(1)
2026–	Chonburi	0	(0)

International career
2011–2012	Thailand U16	9	(1)
2013–2014	Thailand U19	14	(2)
2016	Thailand U21	2	(0)
2014–2018	Thailand U23	16	(2)
2022	Thailand	5	(1)
Medal record
Thailand under-23
Sea Games
Gold medal – first place	Sea Games 2015	Football
Gold medal – first place	Sea Games 2017	Football
- * Club domestic league appearances and goals as of 26 April 2025 (UTC)

Chaowat Veerachat (Thai: เชาว์วัฒน์ วีระชาติ, born 23 June 1996) is a Thai professional footballer who plays as a midfielder for Thai League 1 club Chonburi, and the Thailand national team.

== International career ==
Chaowat won a gold medal at the 2017 Southeast Asian Games in Malaysia.

In 2022, he was called up to the Thailand national team for the friendly matches against Nepal and Suriname.

== International goals ==
Goals for Thailand
#	Date	Venue	Opponent	Score	Result	Competition
1.	24 March 2022	Chonburi Stadium, Chonburi, Thailand	Nepal	2–0	2–0	Friendly

== Honours ==
=== Club ===
Buriram United

- Thai League 1 (2): 2014, 2015
- Thai FA Cup: 2015
- Thai League Cup (2): 2015, 2016
- Toyota Premier Cup: 2016
- Kor Royal Cup: 2015
- Mekong Club Championship: 2015

BG Pathum United

- Thai League 1: 2020–21
- Thai League 2: 2019
- Thailand Champions Cup: 2021
- Thai League Cup: 2023–24

Chonburi

- Thai League 2 : 2024–25

=== International ===
Thailand U-16

- AFF U-16 Youth Championship: 2011

Thailand U-21

- Nations Cup: 2016

Thailand U-23

- Sea Games: 2015, 2017
