= Narubadin Weerawatnodom =

Thai footballer (born 1994)

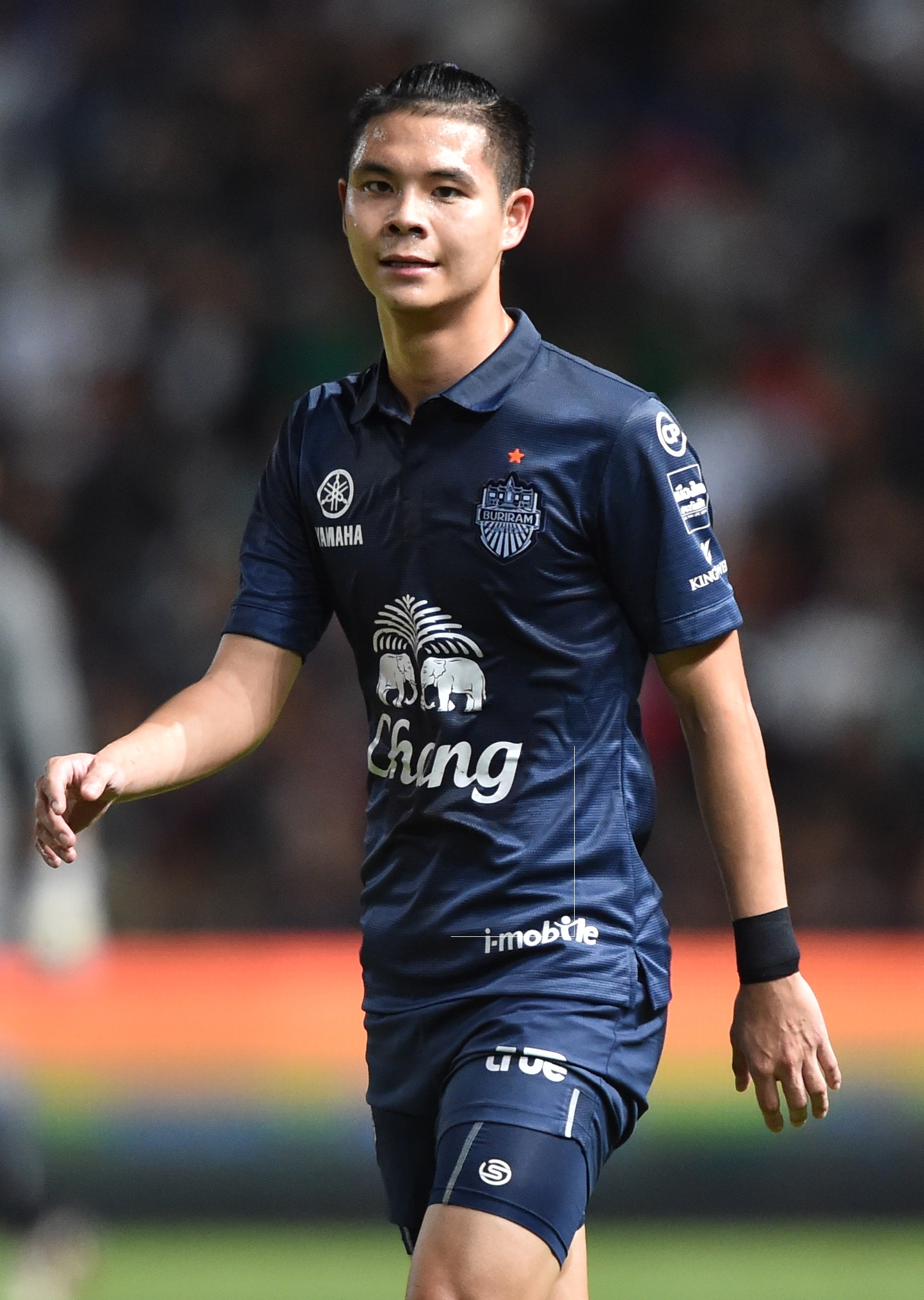
- Narubadin playing for Buriram United in 2015

Personal information
- Full name: Narubadin Weerawatnodom
- Date of birth: 12 July 1994 (age 32)
- Place of birth: Ayutthaya, Thailand
- Height: 1.80 m (5 ft 11 in)
- Position: Right-back

Team information
- Current team: Buriram United
- Number: 15

Youth career
- 2011: Police United
- 2012: BEC Tero Sasana

Senior career*
Years	Team	Apps	(Gls)
2013–2014	BEC Tero Sasana	50	(2)
2015–	Buriram United	251	(8)

International career^{‡}
2011–2012	Thailand U19	8	(2)
2012–2016	Thailand U23	22	(7)
2013–	Thailand	43	(1)
Medal record
Thailand under-19
AFF U-19 Youth Championship
Winner	AFF U-19 Youth Championship 2011	Football
Thailand under-23
Sea Games
Gold medal – first place	Sea Games 2013	Football
Gold medal – first place	Sea Games 2015	Football
Thailand
Asean Football Championship
Winner	Suzuki Cup 2014	2014
Winner	Suzuki Cup 2020	2020
Runner-up	ASEAN 2026	2026
- * Club domestic league appearances and goals as of 15 January 2025 ‡ National team caps and goals as of 22 August 2026

Narubadin Weerawatnodom (Thai: นฤบดินทร์ วีรวัฒโนดม, RTGS: Naruebodin Wirawatnodom, born 12 July 1994) is a Thai professional footballer who plays as a right-back for Thai League 1 club Buriram United and the Thailand national team.

== Club career ==
After finishing the 2014 Thai Premier League with BEC-Tero Sasana, Narubadin moved to Buriram United after the two clubs agreed to trade him with Adisak Kraisorn.

== International career ==
Narubadin won the AFF U-19 Youth Championship with Thailand U19, and played in 2012 AFC U-19 Championship. Narubadin played in the 2013 King's Cup, he also scored a goal in the tournament against Finland national football team. Narubadin scored against Brunei U23 and Faroe Islands. He represented Thailand U23 in the 2013 Southeast Asian Games. He also represented Thailand U23 in the 2014 Asian Games.

Narubadin is part of Thailand's squad in the 2014 AFF Suzuki Cup. In May 2015, he played for Thailand in the 2018 FIFA World Cup qualification (AFC) against Vietnam. He won the 2015 Southeast Asian Games with Thailand U23.

== Club statistics ==
As of match played 12 April 2025

Appearances and goals by club, season and competition
Club	Season	League			FA Cup		League Cup		Asian		Other		Total	
Club	Season	Division	Apps	Goals	Apps	Goals	Apps	Goals	Apps	Goals	Apps	Goals	Apps	Goals
BEC Tero Sasana	2012	Thai League 1	4	0	0	0	1	0	—		—		5	0
BEC Tero Sasana	2013	Thai League 1	18	0	2	0	0	0	—		—		20	0
BEC Tero Sasana	2014	Thai League 1	32	2	1	0	7	1	—		—		40	3
BEC Tero Sasana	Total		54	2	3	0	8	1	—		—		65	3
Buriram United	2015	Thai League 1	29	1	5	0	8	0	5	0	2	0	49	1
Buriram United	2016	Thai League 1	28	0	3	0	0	0	1	0	—		32	0
Buriram United	2017	Thai League 1	31	0	4	0	2	0	—		—		37	0
Buriram United	2018	Thai League 1	11	1	2	0	1	0	5	0	0	0	19	1
Buriram United	2019	Thai League 1	28	1	4	0	5	0	6	0	0	0	43	1
Buriram United	2020–21	Thai League 1	27	1	5	1	—		2	0	—		34	2
Buriram United	2021–22	Thai League 1	27	1	5	0	4	0	1	0	1	0	38	1
Buriram United	2022–23	Thai League 1	27	0	5	0	5	0	—		1	0	38	0
Buriram United	2023–24	Thai League 1	18	1	2	0	2	0	1	0	1	0	24	1
Buriram United	2024–25	Thai League 1	17	1	2	0	1	0	2	0	3	0	25	1
Buriram United	Total		243	7	37	1	28	0	23	0	8	0	339	8
Career total			297	9	40	1	36	1	23	0	8	0	404	11

=== International ===
As of match played 9 June 2026

National team	Year	Apps	Goals
Thailand	2013	3	0
Thailand	2014	8	0
Thailand	2015	4	0
Thailand	2016	3	0
Thailand	2017	3	0
Thailand	2019	6	0
Thailand	2021	9	1
Thailand	2022	3	0
Thailand	2026	2	0
Total		39	1

== International goals ==
=== Under-23 ===
#	Date	Venue	Opponent	Score	Result	Competition
1.	June 6, 2012	Bangkok, Thailand	Philippines	5–0	9–1 (W)	Friendly
2.	June 6, 2012	Bangkok, Thailand	Philippines	9–0	9–1 (W)	Friendly
3.	July 3, 2012	Vientiane, Laos	Hong Kong	3-0	4-0	2013 AFC U-22 Championship qualification
4.	January 21, 2013	Bangkok, Thailand	Faroe Islands	1-0	2-0	Friendly Match
5.	November 22, 2013	Chiang Rai, Thailand	Brunei	2-0	2-0	Friendly Match
6.	August 31, 2014	Phuket, Thailand	Myanmar U-19	3-1	8-1	Friendly Match
7.	September 15, 2014	Incheon, South Korea	Maldives	1-0	2-0	2014 Asian Games
8.	May 29, 2015	Bishan, Singapore	Laos	1–0	6–0	2015 Southeast Asian Games
9.	June 13, 2015	Kallang, Singapore	Indonesia	4–0	5–0	2015 Southeast Asian Games Semi-finals
10.	January 19, 2016	Doha, Qatar	North Korea	1–1	2–2	2016 AFC U-23 Championship

=== Senior ===
#	Date	Venue	Opponent	Score	Result	Competition
1.	January 23, 2013	700th Anniversary Stadium, Chiang Mai, Thailand	Finland	1–2	1–3	Friendly
2.	June 3, 2021	Al Maktoum Stadium, Dubai, United Arab Emirates	Indonesia	1–0	2–2	2022 FIFA World Cup qualification

== Honours ==
=== Club ===
BEC Tero Sasana

- Thai League Cup: 2014

Buriram United

- Thai League 1 (7): 2015, 2017, 2018, 2021–22, 2022–23, 2023–24, 2024–25
- Thai FA Cup (4): 2015, 2021–22, 2022–23, 2024–25
- Thai League Cup (5): 2015, 2016, 2021–22, 2022–23, 2024–25
- Kor Royal Cup (2): 2015, 2016
- Mekong Club Championship (2): 2015, 2016
- Thailand Champions Cup: 2019
- ASEAN Club Championship: 2024–25

=== International ===
Thailand U-19

- AFF U-19 Youth Championship: 2011

Thailand U-23

- SEA Games Gold Medal (2): 2013, 2015

Thailand

- AFF Championship (2): 2014, 2020
- King's Cup: 2016

=== Individual ===
- AFF Championship Best eleven: 2020

== Personal life ==
He is the older brother of actress Tipnaree Weerawatnodom.
