= Koravit Namwiset =

Thai footballer

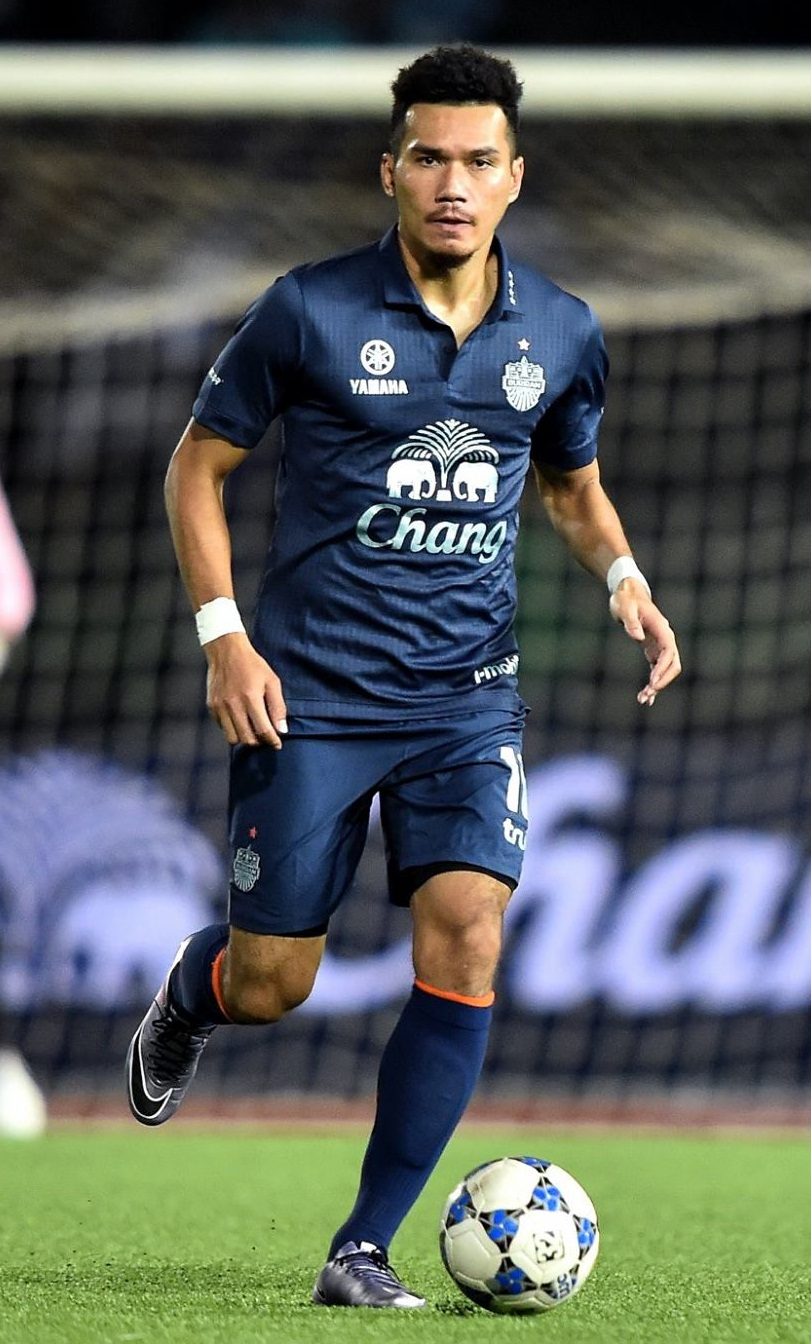

Personal information
- Full name: Koravit Namwiset
- Date of birth: 2 August 1986 (age 40)
- Place of birth: Udon Thani, Thailand
- Height: 1.82 m (5 ft 11 1/2 in)
- Positions: Centre-back; left back

Youth career
- 1999–2004: Namsom Wittayakom School

Senior career*
Years	Team	Apps	(Gls)
2005–2007	PTT Rayong	29	(0)
2008	Customs Department	11	(2)
2009	Samut Songkhram	26	(0)
2010–2014	Bangkok United	116	(2)
2015–2017	Buriram United	54	(4)
2018–2019	PTT Rayong	43	(0)
2020	Chonburi	2	(0)
2020–2021	Muangkan United	38	(0)
2021–2022	Police Tero	3	(0)
2024	Suphanburi	13	(0)
Total		335	(8)

International career
2015–2017	Thailand	20	(0)
Medal record
Thailand
Asean Football Championship
Winner	AFF Suzuki Cup 2016	2016
- * Club domestic league appearances and goals

Koravit Namwiset (Thai: กรวิทย์ นามวิเศษ), simply known as Tui (Thai: ตุ้ย), is a Thai retired professional footballer who plays as a centre-back; he has also been used as a left-back.

== International ==
In May 2015, he played for Thailand in the 2018 FIFA World Cup qualification (AFC) against Vietnam.

=== International ===
Appearances and goals by national team and year
National team	Year	Apps	Goals
Thailand	2015	8	0
Thailand	2016	11	0
Thailand	2017	1	0
Thailand	Total	20	0

== Honours ==
=== Club ===
Buriram United

- Thai League 1 (2): 2015, 2017
- Thai FA Cup (1): 2015
- Thai League Cup (1): 2015
- Kor Royal Cup (1): 2015
- Mekong Club Championship (2): 2015, 2016

=== International ===
Thailand University

- ASEAN University Games Gold Medal (1); 2012

Thailand

- ASEAN Football Championship (1): 2016
