= Gilberto Macena =

Brazilian footballer (born 1984)

Personal information
- Full name: Gilberto Macedo da Macena
- Date of birth: 1 April 1984 (age 42)
- Place of birth: Cachoeirinha, Tocantins, Brazil
- Height: 1.73 m (5 ft 8 in)
- Position: Forward

Team information
- Current team: Rasisalai United
- Number: 10

Senior career*
Years	Team	Apps	(Gls)
2004–2005	Comercial		
2005–2006	Holbæk B&I	22	(16)
2006–2012	Horsens	178	(81)
2012–2013	Shandong Luneng Taishan	53	(13)
2014	Hangzhou Greentown	26	(5)
2015	Buriram United	30	(21)
2016	Al-Qadsiah	12	(2)
2016–2017	Bangkok United	26	(7)
2018	Chiangrai United	6	(2)
2019	Holbæk B&I	10	(1)
2020–2021	Caçadorense	0	(0)
2021–2023	Phitsanulok	56	(24)
2023–2024	Tocantinópolis	2	(1)
2024	Bela Vista	6	(1)
2024–	Rasisalai United	47	(25)
- * Club domestic league appearances and goals as of 24 May 2025

Gilberto Macedo da Macena (born 1 April 1984), commonly known as Gilberto Macena, is a Brazilian footballer who plays as a forward for Rasisalai United of the Thai League 2.

== Career ==
Macena arrived in Denmark in 2005, when he signed for the lower-division club Holbæk B&I. After one successful season in Holbæk, he moved to Danish Superliga team AC Horsens where he was the club top goalscorer on several occasions. After spending seven years in Denmark, Macena moved to Chinese Super League side Shandong Luneng on 16 February 2012 for an undisclosed fee.

On 11 January 2014, Macena transferred to Chinese Super League side Hangzhou Greentown. In January 2015, he made the move to Thai Premier League club Buriram United.

After his contract with Chiangrai United expired at the end of 2018, Macena returned to Denmark, in order to play for a contract. On 23 August 2019, it was confirmed that Macena had signed with his former club, Holbæk B&I. In 2020, he returned to his native Brazil to play for lower tier club Caçadorense.

== Honours ==
Horsens

- Danish 1st Division: 2009–10

Buriram United

- Thai Premier League: 2015
- Thai FA Cup: 2015
- Thai League Cup: 2015
- Kor Royal Cup: 2015
- Mekong Club Championship: 2015

Chiangrai United

- Thailand Champions Cup: 2018

Phitsanulok

- Thai League 3 Northern Region: 2022–23

Rasisalai United

- Thai League 2: 2025–26
- Thai League 3: 2024–25

Individual

- Danish 1st Division top scorer: 2009–10
