= Diogo (footballer, born 1987) =

Brazilian footballer

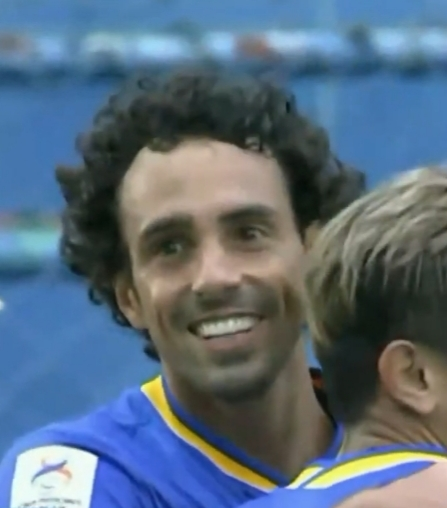
- Diogo with BG Pathum United in 2022

Personal information
- Full name: Diogo Luís Santo
- Date of birth: 26 May 1987 (age 39)
- Place of birth: São Paulo, Brazil
- Height: 1.82 m (6 ft 0 in)
- Position: Striker

Youth career
- 2002–2005: Portuguesa

Senior career*
Years	Team	Apps	(Gls)
2005–2008	Portuguesa	61	(25)
2008–2013	Olympiacos	51	(9)
2010	→ Flamengo (loan)	17	(1)
2011	→ Santos (loan)	11	(1)
2013–2014	Portuguesa	20	(4)
2014	Palmeiras	24	(1)
2015–2018	Buriram United	105	(101)
2019–2020	Johor Darul Ta'zim	32	(16)
2020–2022	BG Pathum United	33	(16)
2023	Johor Darul Ta'zim	11	(7)
Total		365	(181)
- * Club domestic league appearances and goals

Diogo Luís Santo (born 26 May 1987), known simply as Diogo, is a Brazilian former professional footballer who played as a striker.

After starting out at Portuguesa, he spent most of his career in the Super League Greece with Olympiacos – having signed in 2008 – and in the Thai League 1 with Buriram United.

== Club career ==
=== Brazil ===
Born in São Paulo, Diogo started his football career at Associação Portuguesa de Desportos. He quickly made a name for himself at the club, breaking into the first team in 2007 and contributing largely to a promotion to the Série A, scoring 18 goals in 28 games – season's best – and being voted the competition's best player.

It was this form which initially prompted Brazilian under-20 coach Nélson Rodrigues to include Diogo in his team (he had already played in previous national youth sides). In 2008 he had his first taste of top-flight football with Portuguesa, and showed early good form with six goals in 13 matches. Early in the same year, president Manuel da Lupa said he was as good as if not better than AC Milan's teenage sensation Alexandre Pato; he added that the player had only shown 50% of his capability due to consistent injuries.

In July 2008, several teams had been attracted to Diogo's talents, and the player revealed his desire to play his trade in Europe after longtime admirers Arsenal were joined by ACF Fiorentina in bidding for his services. He had been monitored by the former's scouting department for more than two years, and offers included a £9,000,000 one, promptly rejected by Portuguesa; Arsenal manager Arsène Wenger also publicly stated that he had tried to sign him once, as a 16-year-old.

=== Olympiacos ===
Olympiacos F.C. also became interested and, in a widely documented and somewhat controversial period of negotiation, Diogo finally signed for the Greek club in August 2008, for €9 million and 70% of the player's rights. After passing his medical, he agreed to a five-year contract.

Diogo made his first appearance in the season's opener, against Asteras Tripolis F.C. on 30 August 2008. On 6 September he scored from the penalty spot against Ionikos FC, in a friendly. In the second round, he netted the game's only goal at Xanthi FC. During his first campaign he also showcased his good heading ability by scoring many of his goals from headers, being at one point the player with more goals with that specific body part at four.

In that year's UEFA Cup, Diogo scored twice in the 5–0 home victory over FC Nordsjælland on 2 October, adding two more in a 5–1 defeat of S.L. Benfica the following month, also in the group stage and at Karaiskakis Stadium. Hence, heightened rumours of a big-money transfer to Europe's elite – and again to England – surfaced, whilst the player was ranked seventh (out of 50) in The Daily Telegraph's list of Footballers Transfer Target List; eventually, the Piraeus team won the double.

Further interest arose in October 2008, now from three other Premier League sides, Middlesbrough, Chelsea and Liverpool. The latter's coach, Rafa Benítez, again declared interest in the player in March of the following year, preparing to offer £12 million to acquire his services. Anfield scouts had been said to have checked on him, seeing him as a perfect replacement for the departed Robbie Keane; Benítez then loaned Sebastián Leto to Olympiacos, further fueling rumours that the player would be included in a swap deal, but nothing came to fruition, with Leto instead moving to Panathinaikos FC.

Diogo's second season was disastrous for both him and the team, suffering several injuries which limited to just slightly more than half of the games, scoring just two goals and losing his place in the starting lineup to Kostantinos Mitroglou. He started 2010–11 by netting twice against Besa Kavajë of Albania in a 5–0 away win (11–1 on aggregate) in the Europa League. In the competition's next round, however, against Maccabi Tel Aviv FC, he was sent off after punching opposing goalkeeper Liran Strauber, in a 1–0 away loss that also meant the Greeks' elimination on the away goals rule.

=== Back to Brazil ===
Diogo returned to Brazil on 19 August 2010, being loaned to CR Flamengo. Six months later, he joined Santos FC also on loan, failing to perform overall and returning to Olympiacos in January 2012, being excluded from the squad later that year.

On 6 March 2013, Diogo returned to his first club Portuguesa.

=== Buriram United ===
On 31 December 2014, Diogo signed a two-year contract with Buriram United F.C. from the Thai League 1. He scored in his debut on 24 January 2015, helping his new team to defeat Bangkok Glass F.C. 1–0 in the Kor Royal Cup.

Diogo scored 45 goals in 51 competitive games in his first season, as Buriram became the first Asian side to win five titles in one year. He also managed to finish top scorer of the domestic league twice, scoring 133 times overall which was a record at the organisation.

=== Johor Darul Ta'zim ===
On 3 January 2019, Johor Darul Ta'zim F.C. announced the signing of Diogo for an approximate fee of €1.5 million, the highest ever paid by a Malaysian club. In December 2023, after having won several honours including three Super League – he also returned to Thailand to represent BG Pathum United F.C. before heading back to the Sultan Ibrahim Stadium in 2022 – the 36-year-old announced his retirement.

== International career ==
Diogo was called to train with the Brazil under-23 team by manager Dunga in late 2007. He was supposed to have been selected for the FIFA U-20 World Cup earlier that year, but was dropped from the squad after breaking his arm.

== Career statistics ==
As of match played 3 January 2019

Appearances and goals by club, season and competition
Club	Season	League			State League		National cup (Note: Includes Copa do Brasil, Greek Cup, Thai FA Cup.)		League cup (Note: Includes Thai League Cup.)		Continental		Other		Total	
Club	Season	Division	Apps	Goals	Apps	Goals	Apps	Goals	Apps	Goals	Apps	Goals	Apps	Goals	Apps	Goals
Portuguesa	2006	Série B	21	1	?	3	0	0	—		0	0	—		21	4
Portuguesa	2007	Série B	27	18	4	9	3	0	—		0	0	—		31	27
Portuguesa	2008	Série A	13	6	0	0	2	0	—		0	0	—		15	6
Portuguesa	Total		61	25	4	9	5	0	—		0	0	—		67	34
Olympiacos	2008–09	Super League Greece	28	6	—		7	5	—		8	5	0	0	42	16
Olympiacos	2009–10	Super League Greece	17	2	—		0	0	—		5	1	0	0	22	3
Olympiacos	2010–11	Super League Greece	0	0	—		0	0	—		4	2	0	0	4	2
Olympiacos	2011–12	Super League Greece	9	1	—		2	1	—		1	0	0	0	12	2
Olympiacos	2012–13	Super League Greece	1	0	—		0	0	—		0	0	0	0	1	0
Olympiacos	Total		55	9	—		9	6	—		18	8	0	0	81	23
Flamengo (loan)	2010	Série A	17	1	—		—		—		—		—		17	1
Santos (loan)	2011	Série A	11	1	6	0	—		—		3	0	0	0	20	1
Portuguesa	2013	Série A	20	4	—		2	0	—		0	0	—		22	4
Palmeiras	2014	Série A	24	1	6	0	4	0	—		0	0	—		34	1
Buriram United	2015	Thai Premier League	32	33	—		6	3	6	4	6	4	1 (Note: Appearances in Thailand Champions Cup)	1	51	45
Buriram United	2016	Thai Premier League	11	8	—		3	4	3	2	1	0	1	1	19	15
Buriram United	2017	Thai Premier League	29	26	—		3	3	1	0	—		0	0	33	29
Buriram United	2018	Thai Premier League	33	34	—		6	2	4	4	7	2	1	1	51	43
Buriram United	Total		105	101	—		18	12	14	10	14	6	3	3	154	132

== Honours ==
Olympiacos

- Super League Greece: 2008–09, 2011–12, 2012–13
- Greek Football Cup: 2008–09, 2011–12

Santos

- Campeonato Paulista: 2011
- Copa Libertadores: 2011

Buriram United

- Thai League 1: 2015, 2017, 2018
- Thai FA Cup: 2015
- Thai League Cup: 2015, 2016
- Thailand Champions Cup: 2015, 2016
- Mekong Club Championship: 2015, 2016
- Toyota Premier Cup: 2016

Johor Darul Ta'zim

- Malaysia Super League: 2019, 2020, 2023
- Malaysia FA Cup: 2023
- Malaysia Cup: 2019, 2023
- Piala Sumbangsih: 2019, 2020

BG Pathum United

- Thai League 1: 2020–21
- Thailand Champions Cup: 2021, 2022

Individual

- Thai League 1 top scorer: 2015, 2018
- Best Foreign Player – Malaysia National Football Awards: 2019
