= Junior Atemengue =

Cameroonian footballer

Personal information
- Full name: Junior Dieudonné Bénédictus Atemengue Awono
- Date of birth: 1 July 1995 (age 31)
- Place of birth: Yaoundé, Cameroon
- Height: 1.95 m (6 ft 5 in)
- Position: Forward

Youth career
- 2012: Sport Etudes de Mfou

Senior career*
Years	Team	Apps	(Gls)
2013	Renaissance		
2014	Tonnerre Yaoundé		
2015	Union Douala		
2015	Buriram United	0	(0)
2015	→ Surin City (loan)		
2016	APEJES Academy		
2017	Chabab Atlas Khénifra	14	(2)
2017–2018	Mouloudia Oujda	5	(1)
2018–2019	Neman Grodno	22	(1)
2020	Energetik-BGU Minsk	14	(0)
2022	Bechem United	2	(0)
- * Club domestic league appearances and goals as of 31 May 2022

Junior Atemengue (born 1 July 1995) is a Cameroonian professional footballer.
