= Kitphom Bunsan =

Thai footballer (born 1993)

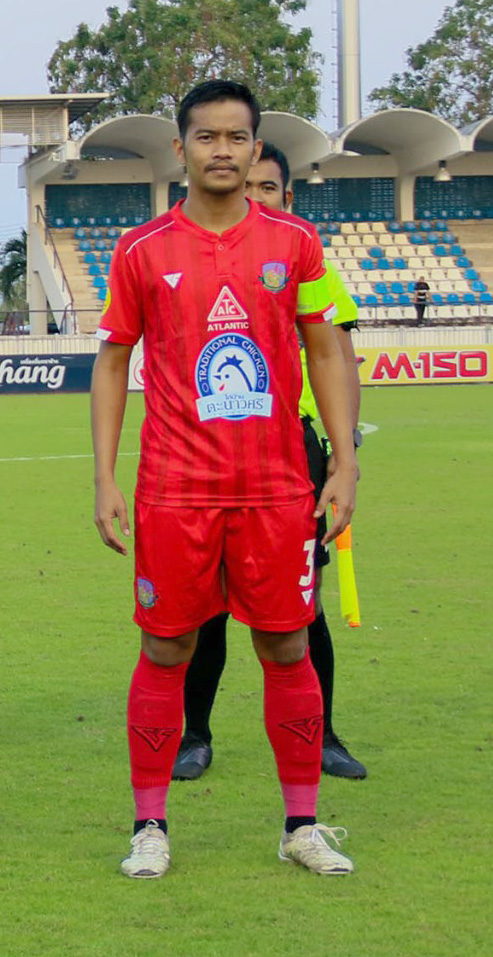

Personal information
- Full name: Kitphom Bunsan
- Date of birth: 29 November 1993 (age 32)
- Place of birth: Chanthaburi, Thailand
- Height: 1.74 m (5 ft 8 1/2 in)
- Position: Left back

Team information
- Current team: Police Tero
- Number: 5

Youth career
- 2011: Police United

Senior career*
Years	Team	Apps	(Gls)
2011–2014	Police United	15	(1)
2015	Buriram United	1	(0)
2015–2017	Ubon UMT United	32	(0)
2018	Police Tero	23	(1)
2019	PT Prachuap	3	(0)
2019–2020	Samut Prakan City	11	(0)
2020–2021	Kasetsart	25	(0)
2021–2022	Khonkaen United	36	(0)
2022–2023	Muangthong United	10	(0)
2023–2026	Ayutthaya United	78	(5)
2026–	Police Tero	0	(0)

International career^{‡}
2011	Thailand U19	6	(0)
2014	Thailand U23	4	(0)
- * Club domestic league appearances and goals as of 26 April 2025 ‡ National team caps and goals as of 28 December 2014

Kitphom Bunsan (Thai: กฤษณ์พรหม บุญสาร, born November 29, 1993), simply known as Dew (Thai: ดิว), is a Thai professional footballer who plays as a left back for Thai League 2 club Police Tero.

== Honours ==
=== Club ===
Buriram United

- Kor Royal Cup: 2015

Ubon UMT United

- Regional League Division 2: 2015
