= 2015 Kor Royal Cup =

Buriram United	Bangkok Glass
1	0
- Date: 24 January 2015
- Venue: Suphachalasai Stadium, Bangkok
- Referee: Alongkorn Feemuechang

The 2015 Kor Royal Cup was the 80th Kor Royal Cup, an annual football match contested by the winners of the previous season's Thai Premier League and Thai FA Cup competitions. The match was played at Suphachalasai Stadium, Bangkok, on 24 January 2015, and contested by 2014 Thai Premier League champions Buriram United, and Bangkok Glass as the winner of the 2014 Thai FA Cup.

== Details ==
24 January 2015
18.00 UTC+7

Buriram United	1–0	Bangkok Glass
Diogo Luís Santo 57'	Report

Suphachalasai Stadium, Bangkok
Referee: Alongkorn Feemuechang

BURIRAM UNITED	BANGKOK GLASS

BURIRAM UNITED:
GK	1	(Thailand) Sivaruck Tedsungnoen		(yellow card) 95'
CB	14	(Thailand) Chitipat Tanklang		(yellow card) 15'
CB	5	(Venezuela) Andrés Túñez
CB	16	(Thailand) Korawit Namwiset		(substituted off) 70'
RM	13	(Thailand) Narubadin Weerawatnodom
MF	19	(Thailand) Naruphol Ar-Romsawa		(substituted off) 74'
MF	7	(South Korea) Go Seul-ki
MF	8	(Thailand) Suchao Nutnum (c)		(yellow card) 13'
LM	2	(Thailand) Theerathon Bunmathan
FW	22	(Brazil) Gilberto Macena
FW	40	(Brazil) Diogo Luís Santo	(yellow card) 52'	(substituted off) 94'
Substitutes:
GK	39	(Thailand) Sornchai Suklom
DF	3	(Thailand) Kritprom Boonsarn
FW	9	(New Zealand) Kayne Vincent		(substituted in) 94'
MF	15	(Thailand) Surat Sukha
DF	17	(Thailand) Anawin Jujeen
FW	18	(Thailand) Sittichok Kannoo
MF	21	(Thailand) Prakit Deeprom		(substituted in) 74'
FW	23	(Thailand) Santirad Weing-in
DF	24	(Thailand) Nukoolkit Krutyai		(substituted in) 70'
DF	25	(Thailand) Suree Sukha
MF	28	(Thailand) Chaowat Veerachat
Manager:
(Brazil) Alexandre Gama

BANGKOK GLASS:
GK	1	(Thailand) Narit Taweekul
RB	2	(Thailand) Wasan Homsaen
DF	36	(Thailand) Suwannapat Kingkkaew
DF	4	(Australia) Matt Smith	(yellow card) 63'
LB	17	(Thailand) Supachai Komsilp
DM	23	(Thailand) Peerapong Pichitchotirat
DM	28	(Thailand) Ongart Pamonprasert	(substituted off) 62'
RW	29	(Thailand) Chatree Chimtalay (c)	(substituted off) 77'
CM	22	(North Macedonia) Darko Tasevski
LF	20	(Thailand) Suradetch Thongchai	(substituted off) 46'
FW	11	(Namibia) Lazarus Kaimbi	(yellow card) 29'
Substitutes:
GK	18	(Thailand) Sarawut Konglarp
GK	38	(Thailand) Pornchai Kasikonudompaisan
DF	5	(Thailand) Pravinwat Boonyong
DF	6	(Thailand) Piyachart Tamaphan
MF	8	(Thailand) Narong Jansawek	(substituted in) 46'
FW	9	(Brazil) Leandro Oliveira	(substituted in) 67'
MF	10	(Thailand) Suphasek Kaikaew	(substituted in) 62'
MF	16	(Thailand) Bordin Phala
DF	21	(Thailand) Jetsadakorn Hemdaeng
MF	24	(Thailand) Siwakorn Sangwong
MF	39	(Thailand) Thanasit Siriphala
FW	40	(Japan) Goshi Okubo
Manager:
(Spain) Ricardo Rodríguez

Assistant referees:
Kriengsak Kiatsongkram
Anuwat Feemuechang
Fourth official:
Sivakorn Pu-Udom

MATCH RULES

- 90 minutes.
- Penalty shoot-out if necessary.
- Maximum of three substitutions.

== See also ==
- 2015 Thai Premier League
- 2015 Thai Division 1 League
- 2015 Regional League Division 2
- 2015 Thai FA Cup
- 2015 Thai League Cup
