= Andrés Túñez =

Venezuelan footballer (born 1987)

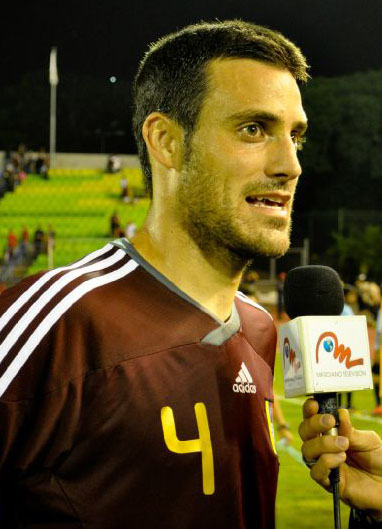

Personal information
- Full name: Andrés José Túñez Arceo
- Date of birth: 15 March 1987 (age 39)
- Place of birth: Caracas, Venezuela
- Height: 1.87 m (6 ft 2 in)
- Position: Centre-back

Youth career
- 1997–2002: Rosalia de Castro
- 2002–2004: Compostela
- 2004–2006: Celta

Senior career*
Years	Team	Apps	(Gls)
2006–2010	Celta B	73	(0)
2010–2014	Celta	82	(3)
2013–2014	→ Beitar Jerusalem (loan)	23	(0)
2014–2020	Buriram United	149	(31)
2017	→ Elche (loan)	17	(0)
2020–2023	BG Pathum United	56	(9)
Total		400	(43)

International career
2011–2015	Venezuela	16	(0)
- * Club domestic league appearances and goals

Andrés José Túñez Arceo (Latin American Spanish: [anˈdɾes ˈtuɲes]; born 15 March 1987) is a Venezuelan former professional footballer who played as a central defender.

He spent the better part of his 17-year career with Celta and Buriram United, winning several titles with the latter club including four Thai League 1 championships.

Túñez represented Venezuela internationally.

== Early years ==
Túñez was born in Caracas, Venezuela to José "Pepe" Túñez and Margarita Arceo, a family of Spanish immigrants from Galicia. Aged 7, his family would return to their hometown of Bertamirans, Ames.

== Club career ==
Túñez began playing football at Colegio La Salle primary school, in the nearby city of Santiago de Compostela. Three years later, he joined the Escuela de Fútbol de Rosalia de Castro academy. After a two-year spell at SD Compostela, he moved to neighbouring RC Celta de Vigo to complete his development.

In February 2010, following Jordi Figueras's transfer to FC Rubin Kazan, Túñez was promoted to the first team. He had spent nearly four seasons with the reserves in the Segunda División B, and finished that campaign with 16 league appearances with the main squad, which competed in the Segunda División.

Túñez contributed 29 games (all starts) in 2011–12, as Celta returned to La Liga after an absence of five years. He scored his only goal of the season on 28 January 2012, in a 1–0 away win against Girona FC.

Túñez played his first match in the Spanish top flight on 18 August 2012, starting in a 0–1 home loss to Málaga CF. After being deemed surplus to requirements by new manager Luis Enrique he moved to Thailand, going on to win several accolades including four Thai League 1 championships; interspersed with this, he served a loan at Israeli Premier League club Beitar Jerusalem F.C. alongside his teammate Jonathan Vila.

In April 2023, after three seasons with BG Pathum United F.C. also in the Thai top tier, the 36-year-old Túñez announced his retirement.

== International career ==
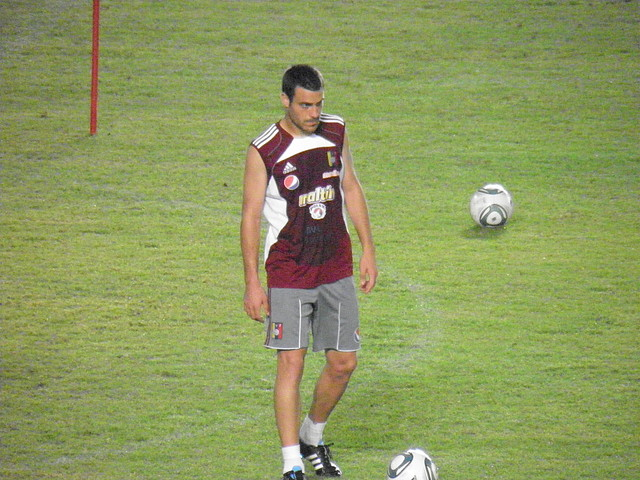
Tuñez training with Venezuela in 2011.

On 24 February 2010, it was reported in the local papers that the Venezuela national team had approached Túñez's agent with an offer for the player to represent the nation. He made his debut in September of the following year, playing injury time of a 1–0 friendly defeat with Argentina.

== Career statistics ==
Club	Season	League			Cup		League Cup		Continental		Other		Total	
Club	Season	Division	Apps	Goals	Apps	Goals	Apps	Goals	Apps	Goals	Apps	Goals	Apps	Goals
Celta B	2006–07	Segunda División B	9	0	—		—		—		—		9	0
Celta B	2007–08	Segunda División B	23	0	—		—		—		—		23	0
Celta B	2008–09	Segunda División B	25	0	—		—		—		—		25	0
Celta B	2009–10	Segunda División B	16	0	—		—		—		—		16	0
Celta B			73	0	—		—		—		—		73	0
Celta	2009–10	Segunda División	16	1	7	0	—		—		—		23	1
Celta	2010–11	Segunda División	7	1	0	0	—		—		1 (Note: Appearance in La Liga play-offs)	0	8	1
Celta	2011–12	Segunda División	29	1	0	0	—		—		—		29	1
Celta	2012–13	La Liga	30	0	3	0	—		—		—		33	0
Celta			82	3	10	0	—		—		1	0	93	3
Beitar Jerusalem	2013–14	Israeli Premier League	23	0	2	0	—		—		—		25	0
Buriram United	2014	Thai Premier League	19	2	1	0			—		—		20	2
Buriram United	2015	Thai Premier League	27	9	10	7			6	1	1	0	44	17
Buriram United	2016	Thai League 1	27	9	11	9			5	1	1	1	44	20
Buriram United	2017	Thai League 1	17	1	4	0	2	0	—		—		23	1
Buriram United	2018	Thai League 1	28	3	6	0	4	0	7	1	1	0	46	4
Buriram United	2019	Thai League 1	27	6	4	1	4	0	6	0	1	0	42	7
Buriram United	2020–21	Thai League 1	4	1	—		—		2	0	—		6	1
Buriram United	Total		149	31	36	17	10	0	26	3	4	1	225	52
Elche (loan)	2016–17	Segunda División	17	0	—		—		—		—		17	0
BG Pathum United	2020–21	Thai League 1	23	5	2	1	—		5	1	—		30	7
BG Pathum United	2021–22	Thai League 1	20	3	3	0	3	0	7	0	1	0	34	3
BG Pathum United	2022–23	Thai League 1	13	1	2	0	2	0	—		—		17	1
BG Pathum United	Total		56	9	7	1	5	0	12	1	1	0	81	11
Career total			400	43	55	18	15	0	38	4	6	1	514	66

== Honours ==
Buriram United

- Thai League 1: 2014, 2015, 2017, 2018
- Thai FA Cup: 2015
- Kor Royal Cup: 2015, 2016
- Thailand Champions Cup: 2019
- Thai League Cup: 2015, 2016
- Mekong Club Championship: 2015
- Toyota Premier Cup: 2016

BG Pathum United

- Thai League 1: 2020–21
- Thailand Champions Cup: 2022
- Thai League Cup runners-up: 2022–23

Individual

- Thai League 1 Best XI: 2020–21
