= Go Seul-ki =

South Korean footballer (born 1986)

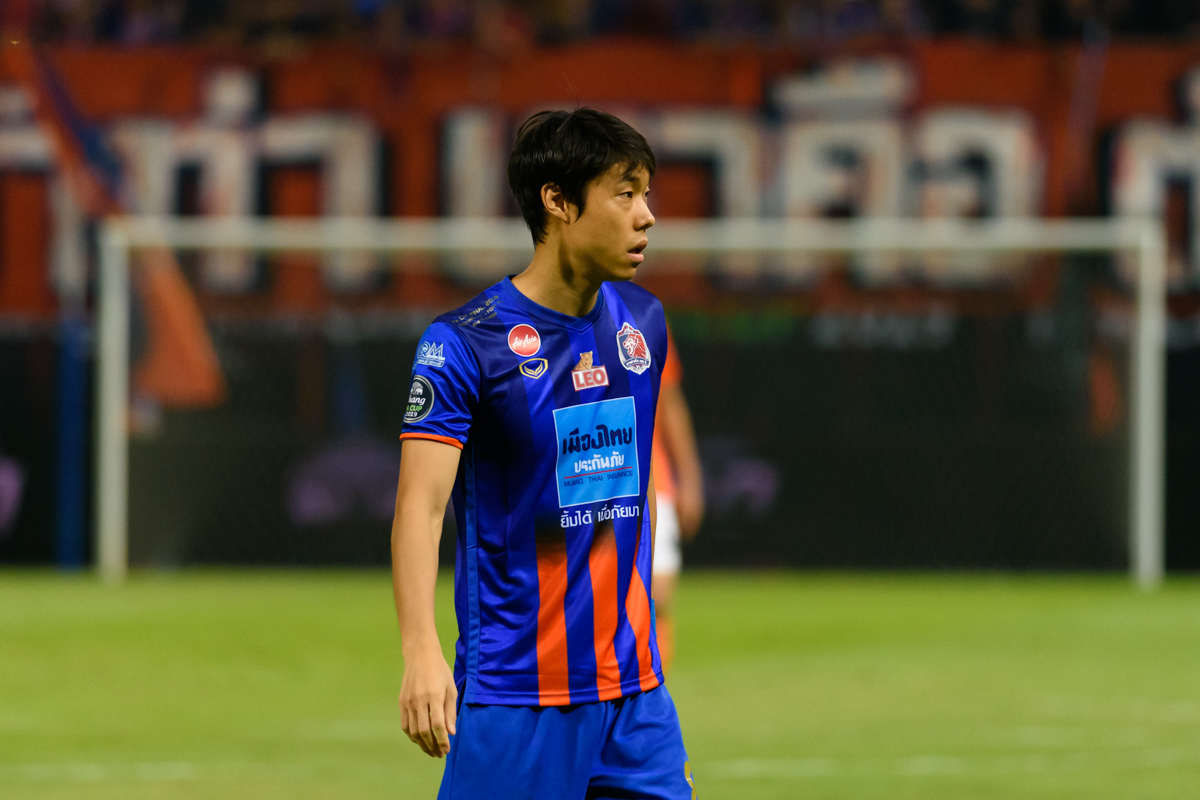
- Go with Port in 2019

Personal information
- Full name: Go Seul-ki
- Date of birth: 21 April 1986 (age 40)
- Place of birth: Seoul, South Korea
- Height: 1.84 m (6 ft 0 in)
- Position: Defensive midfielder

Senior career*
Years	Team	Apps	(Gls)
2005–2009	Pohang Steelers	10	(0)
2008–2009	→ Gwangju Sangmu (army)	37	(5)
2010–2012	Ulsan Hyundai	82	(12)
2013–2014	El Jaish	32	(1)
2015–2019	Buriram United	75	(14)
2018	→ Incheon United (loan)	26	(2)
2019	→ Port (loan)	26	(3)
2020–2022	Port	46	(5)
2023	Chonburi	6	(0)
2024–2025	Chanthaburi	25	(8)
2025	Police Tero	4	(1)
- * Club domestic league appearances and goals as of 30 December 2025

- Go Seul-ki
- Hangul: 고슬기
- Hanja: 高瑟基
- RR: Go Seulgi
- MR: Ko Sŭlgi

Go Seul-ki (Korean: 고슬기; born 21 April 1986) is a South Korean footballer who plays as a defensive midfielder. His previous clubs were Buriram United, El Jaish, Ulsan Hyundai, Gwangju Sangmu, Pohang Steelers and Police Tero.

== Career statistics ==
As of 13 March 2016

Club performance			League		Cup		League Cup		Continental		Total	
Season	Club	League	Apps	Goals	Apps	Goals	Apps	Goals	Apps	Goals	Apps	Goals
2005	Pohang Steelers	K League 1	0	0	0	0	0	0	-		0	0
2006	Pohang Steelers	K League 1	0	0	1	1	0	0	-		1	1
2007	Pohang Steelers	K League 1	0	0	0	0	0	0	-		0	0
2008	Gwangju Sangmu	K League 1	20	3	3	0	8	0	-		31	3
2009	Gwangju Sangmu	K League 1	17	2	1	0	3	0	-		21	2
2009	Pohang Steelers	K League 1	1	0	0	0	0	0	2	0	3	0
2010	Ulsan Hyundai	K League 1	13	1	1	0	2	0	-		16	1
2011	Ulsan Hyundai	K League 1	29	7	4	4	8	0	-		41	11
2012	Ulsan Hyundai	K League 1	40	4	4	1	-		10	1	54	6
2012-2013	El Jaish SC	Qatar Stars League	8	1	-		-		7	1	15	2
2013-2014	El Jaish SC	Qatar Stars League	24	0	5	0	-		7	3	36	3
2015	Buriram United	Thai Premier League	31	8	6	2	7	1	7	1	52	12
2016	Buriram United	Thai Premier League	3	1	2	2	0	0	3	0	9	3
Career total			186	27	27	10	28	1	36	6	278	71

== Honours ==
Pohang Steelers

- Korean League Cup: 2009

Ulsan Hyundai

- AFC Champions League: 2012
- Korean League Cup: 2011

El Jaish

- Qatar Crown Prince Cup: 2014
- Qatari Stars Cup: 2012–13

Buriram United

- Thai Premier League: 2015, 2017
- Thai FA Cup: 2015
- Thai League Cup: 2015, 2016
- Kor Royal Cup: 2015
- Mekong Club Championship: 2015, 2016

Port

- Thai FA Cup: 2019
