= Jandson =

Brazilian footballer

Personal information
- Full name: Jandson dos Santos
- Date of birth: 16 September 1986 (age 40)
- Place of birth: Sergipe, Brazil
- Height: 1.89 m (6 ft 2 in)
- Position: Striker

Youth career
- 2000–2001: Ceará
- 2002–2003: Uniclinic
- 2004: Criciúma
- 2005: Avaí

Senior career*
Years	Team	Apps	(Gls)
2005–2011	Avaí	9	(3)
2007–2008	→ Ramat Gan (loan)		
2009	→ Novo Hamburgo (loan)		
2009	→ Juventude (loan)	1	
2010	→ América Mineiro (loan)	17	(3)
2011	→ Grêmio Prudente	11	(4)
2011	Feirense		
2012–2013	Lajeadense	28	(8)
2012	→ Brasiliense (loan)	1	(0)
2013–2015	Najran	33	(21)
2015	Buriram United	6	(4)
2016–2017	Al-Qadisiyah	9	(5)
2016–2017	→ Al-Khaleej (loan)	23	(12)
2017	Chiangrai United	12	(3)
2018	Al-Khaleej	0	(0)
- * Club domestic league appearances and goals as of 09:15, 26 November 2017 (UTC)

Jandson dos Santos (born 16 September 1986), simply known as Jandson, is a Brazilian professional footballer who plays as a striker .

== Honours ==
=== Club ===
Buriram united

- Thai League Cup: 2015

Chiangrai United

- Thai FA Cup (1): 2017
