= Anthony Moura-Komenan =

Ivorian footballer (born 1986)

Anthony Moura
Personal information
- Full name: Anthony David Moura-Komenan
- Date of birth: 20 January 1986 (age 40)
- Place of birth: Bruges, Gironde, France
- Height: 1.70 m (5 ft 7 in)
- Position: Midfielder

Youth career
- FC Eyrans Saint-Seurin Cartelègue
- –2003: FC Estuaire Haute-Gironde
- 2003–2004: Girondins de Bordeaux

Senior career*
Years	Team	Apps	(Gls)
2004–2006	Girondins de Bordeaux	0	(0)
2006–2008	FC Libourne-Saint-Seurin	50	(4)
2009	Ajaccio	8	(0)
2010–2011	Rodez	57	(10)
2011–2012	Rouen	16	(1)
2012–2017	Super Power Samut Prakan	134	(37)
2017	PTT Rayong	19	(3)

International career
2008	Ivory Coast U-23	4	(0)
- * Club domestic league appearances and goals as of 25 November 2010

Anthony David Moura-Komenan (born 20 January 1986) is an Ivorian former professional footballer who played as a midfielder.

== Career ==
The-23-year-old, who came through the Bordeaux academy, is a free agent after leaving French club AC Ajaccio, who he joined in January 2009.

=== Trial at Huddersfield Town ===
Anthony was on trial with English League One side Huddersfield Town, and had been recommended to Lee Clark by former Newcastle teammate Antoine Sibierski.

He received a standing ovation on his debut when he was brought off in the 87min for the Huddersfield Town Reserves in their narrow defeat to Middlesbrough Reserves losing 1–0.

This is what Lee Clark said about him:

"Anthony has got a good pedigree as a youngster at the Bordeaux academy, but he hasn't been associated with a club this season," said Clark, who had the player recommended by (former Newcastle teammate) Antoine Sibierski.

"He's not played much football recently, but we've been impressed with what we've seen of him in training – he's got ability.

=== Rodez ===
On 4 January 2010, the 23-year old midfielder who was a free agent after terminating his contract with AC Ajaccio had signed an 18-month deal with Rodez FC.

== International career ==
He represented his country Ivory Coast at the 2008 Olympic Games.
