= 2015 Thai Premier League =

Thai Premier League
- Season: 2015
- Dates: 14 February – 13 December
- Champions: Buriram United
- Relegated: Port; TOT
- AFC Champions League: Buriram United; Muangthong United; Chonburi
- Matches: 306
- Goals: 870 (2.84 per match)
- Top goalscorer: Diogo (33 goals)
- Biggest home win: Buriram 7–0 Chainat (19 September 2015); Muangthong 7–0 Navy (19 September 2015)
- Biggest away win: Chiangrai 0–5 BEC Tero (13 December 2015)
- Highest scoring: Osotspa 3–6 Buriram (31 October 2015)
- Longest winning run: 14 matches Buriram United
- Longest unbeaten run: 34 matches Buriram United
- Longest winless run: 16 matches TOT
- Longest losing run: 5 matches TOT
- Highest attendance: 34,659; N. Ratchasima 1–1 Buriram (11 July 2015)
- Lowest attendance: 537; Osotspa 2–1 TOT (1 March 2015)
- Total attendance: 1,926,278
- Average attendance: 6,295

The 2015 Thai Premier League (also known as Toyota Thai Premier League due to the sponsorship from Toyota) was the 19th season of the Thai Premier League since its establishment in 1996. A total of 18 teams competed in the league. The season began on 14 February and finished on 13 December.

Buriram United were the defending champions, having won their Thai Premier League title the previous season. Nakhon Ratchasima, Saraburi and Navy entered as the three promoted teams.

== Teams ==
A total of 18 teams contested the league, including 15 sides from the 2014 season and three promoted from the 2014 Thai Division 1 League.

Police United, PTT Rayong, Songkhla United, Air Force Central and GSE Samut Songkhram were relegated to the 2015 Thai Division 1 League after finishing the 2014 season. They were replaced by the best three teams from the 2014 Thai Division 1 League champions Nakhon Ratchasima, runners-up Saraburi and third place Navy.

=== Stadiums and locations ===
Locations of the 2015 Thai Premier League teams
Football clubs in Bangkok Metropolitan Region

Note: Table lists in alphabetical order.

Team	Province	Stadium	Capacity	Ref.
Army United	Bangkok	Thai Army Sports Stadium	20,000	
Bangkok Glass	Pathumthani	Leo Stadium	13,000	
Bangkok United	Bangkok	Thai-Japanese Stadium	10,320	
BEC Tero Sasana	Bangkok	72-years Anniversary Stadium	10,000	
Buriram United	Buriram	New I-Mobile Stadium	32,600	
Chainat Hornbill	Chainat	Khao Plong Stadium	12,000	
Chiangrai United	Chiangrai	United Stadium of Chiangrai	15,000	
Chonburi	Chonburi	Chonburi Stadium	8,500	
Muangthong United	Nonthaburi	SCG Stadium	17,500	
Nakhon Ratchasima	Nakhon Ratchasima	80th Birthday Stadium	28,000	
Navy	Chonburi	Sattahip Navy Stadium	12,500	
Osotspa Samut Prakan	Samut Prakan	M Power Stadium	4,100	
Port	Bangkok	PAT Stadium	12,308	
Ratchaburi	Ratchaburi	Ratchaburi Province Stadium	10,000	
Saraburi	Saraburi	Saraburi PAO. Stadium	6,000	
Sisaket	Sisaket	Sri Nakhon Lamduan Stadium	10,000	
Suphanburi	Suphanburi	Suphanburi Municipality Stadium	25,000	
TOT	Bangkok	TOT Stadium Chaeng Watthana	5,000	

=== Name changes ===
- Osotspa Saraburi renamed themselves to Osotspa Samut Prakan.
- Singhtarua renamed themselves to Port.

=== Stadium changes ===
- Osotspa Samut Prakan used the M Power Stadium in Samut Prakan, a change from the previous season where they used the Saraburi Stadium in Saraburi as their home ground in 2014.

=== Personnel and sponsoring ===
Note: Flags indicate national team as has been defined under FIFA eligibility rules. Players may hold more than one non-FIFA nationality.

Team	Head coach	Captain	Kit manufacturer	Shirt sponsor
Army United	(Thailand) Watcharakorn Antakhamphu	(Thailand) Chaiwat Nak-iem	Made by club	Chang
Bangkok Glass	(Thailand) Anurak Srikerd	(Thailand) Chatree Chimtalay	Nike	Leo Beer
Bangkok United	(Brazil) Alexandré Pölking	(Thailand) Wittaya Madlam	Ari	True
BEC Tero Sasana	(Thailand) Rangsan Viwatchaichok	(Thailand) Rangsan Viwatchaichok	FBT	FB Battery
Buriram United	(Brazil) Alexandre Gama	(Thailand) Suchao Nutnum	Made by club	Chang
Chainat Hornbill	(Thailand) Issara Sritaro	(Thailand) Somjet Sattabud	Made by club	Wangkanai
Chiangrai United	(Thailand) Teerasak Po-on	(Thailand) Pichitphong Choeichiu	Made by club	Leo Beer
Chonburi	(Thailand) Jadet Meelarp	(Thailand) Pipob On-Mo	Nike	Chang
Muangthong United	(Croatia) Dragan Talajić	(Thailand) Datsakorn Thonglao	Grand Sport	SCG
Nakhon Ratchasima	(Japan) Sugao Kambe	(Thailand) Chalermpong Kerdkaew	Grand Sport	Mazda
Navy	(Brazil) Stefano Cugurra	(Thailand) Nataporn Phanrit	Warrix Sports	HR-Pro
Osotspa Samut Prakan	(Thailand) Kritsada Piandit	(Thailand) Jetsada Puanakunmee	Grand Sport	M-150
Port	(Japan) Masahiro Wada	(Thailand) Kiatjarern Ruangparn	Joma	Muang Thai
Ratchaburi	(Spain) Josep Ferré	(Brazil) Heberty	Kappa	Mitr Phol
Saraburi	(Thailand) Pairoj Borwonwatanadilok	(Thailand) Panuwat Yimsa-ngar	Kool	None
Sisaket	(Thailand) Chalermwoot Sa-Ngapol	(Thailand) Ekkapan Jandakorn	Warrix Sports	Muang Thai
Suphanburi	(Thailand) Worrawoot Srimaka	(Thailand) Prat Samakrat	Warrix Sports	Chang
TOT	(Thailand) Tewesh Kamonsin	(Japan) Takahiro Kawamura	Pan	Kan Air

=== Managerial changes ===
Team	Outgoing manager	Manner of departure	Date of vacancy	Table	Incoming manager	Date of appointment
Ratchaburi	(Spain) Ricardo Rodríguez	End of Contract	1 November 2014	Pre-season	(Spain) Àlex Gómez	1 November 2014
Chonburi	(Japan) Masahiro Wada	End of Contract	10 November 2014	Pre-season	(Thailand) Jadet Meelarp	13 November 2014
Chainat Hornbill	(Thailand) Jadet Meelarp	Signed by Chonburi	13 November 2014	Pre-season	(Thailand) T. Damrong-Ongtrakul	13 November 2014
Bangkok Glass	(Thailand) Anurak Srikerd	Removed from position	13 November 2014	Pre-season	(Spain) Ricardo Rodríguez	13 November 2014
BEC Tero Sasana	(Brazil) Jose Alves Borges	End of Contract	13 November 2014	Pre-season	(Serbia) Božidar Bandović	13 November 2014
Port	(Thailand) Dusit Chalermsan	Resigned	18 November 2014	Pre-season	(Thailand) Somchai Chuayboonchum	20 November 2014
Suphanburi	(Bulgaria) Velizar Popov	End of Contract	24 November 2014	Pre-season	(Brazil) Sérgio Farias	18 December 2014
Ratchaburi	(Spain) Àlex Gómez	Resigned due to illness	30 January 2015	Pre-season	(Spain) Josep Ferré	31 January 2015
Port	(Thailand) Somchai Chuayboonchum	Resigned	2 April 2015	15th	(Thailand) Paiboon Lertvimonrut	2 April 2015
Saraburi	(Thailand) Totchtawan Sripan	Resigned	8 April 2015	18th	(Finland) Mika Lönnström	14 April 2015
BEC Tero Sasana	(Serbia) Božidar Bandović	Sacked	9 May 2015	13th	(Northern Ireland) Kenny Shiels	21 May 2015
Army United	(England) Gary Stevens	Sacked	15 May 2015	4th	(Thailand) Issara Sritaro	17 May 2015
Saraburi	(Finland) Mika Lönnström	Resigned	15 June 2015	18th	(Thailand) Pairoj Borwonwatanadilok	1 July 2015
Port	(Thailand) Paiboon Lertvimonrut	Sacked	16 June 2015	14th	(England) Gary Stevens	16 June 2015
Navy	(Thailand) Surasak Tungsurat	Sacked	8 July 2015	17th	(Thailand) Arjhan Srong-ngamsub	8 July 2015
TOT	(Thailand) Somchai Subpherm	Sacked	17 July 2015	18th	(Thailand) Apisit Kaikaew	24 July 2015
Port	(England) Gary Stevens	Sacked	27 July 2015	16th	(Thailand) Somchai Subpherm	27 July 2015
BEC Tero Sasana	(Northern Ireland) Kenny Shiels	Sacked	9 August 2015	14th	(Portugal) Manuel Cajuda	28 August 2015
Suphanburi	(Brazil) Sérgio Farias	Resigned	13 August 2015	6th	(Thailand) Worrawoot Srimaka	13 August 2015
Osotspa Samut Prakan	(Brazil) Stefano Cugurra	Sacked	20 August 2015	10th	(Thailand) Kritsada Piandit	25 August 2015
Navy	(Thailand) Arjhan Srong-ngamsub	Resigned	20 September 2015	17th	(Brazil) Stefano Cugurra	22 September 2015
TOT	(Thailand) Apisit Kaikaew	Sacked	12 October 2015	18th	(Thailand) Tewesh Kamonsin	12 October 2015
Port	(Thailand) Somchai Subpherm	Resigned	20 October 2015	17th	(Japan) Masahiro Wada	21 October 2015
Army United	(Thailand) Issara Sritaro	Sacked	22 October 2015	10th	(Thailand) Watcharakorn Antakhamphu	23 October 2015
Chainat Hornbill	(Thailand) T. Damrong-Ongtrakul	Resigned	9 November 2015	14th	(Thailand) Issara Sritaro	9 November 2015
Bangkok Glass	(Spain) Ricardo Rodríguez	Sacked	24 November 2015	5th	(Thailand) Anurak Srikerd	24 November 2015
BEC Tero Sasana	(Portugal) Manuel Cajuda	Resigned	1 December 2015	16th	(Thailand) Rangsan Vivatchaichok	1 December 2015

=== Foreign players ===
The number of foreign players is restricted to five per TPL team. A team can use four foreign players on the field in each game, including at least one player from the AFC country.

Club	Player 1	Player 2	Player 3	Player 4	Asian Player	Former Player
Army United	(Brazil) Alex	(Brazil) Raphael Botti	(Japan) Kai Hirano	(Slovakia) Zdenko Kaprálik	(Singapore) Hassan Sunny	(Namibia) Tangeni Shipahu (Netherlands) Melvin de Leeuw
Bangkok Glass	(Japan) Goshi Okubo	(North Macedonia) Darko Tasevski	(Spain) Aridane Santana	(Spain) Toti	(Australia) Matt Smith	(Brazil) Leandro (Namibia) Lazarus Kaimbi
Bangkok United	(Brazil) Leandro Tatu	(France) Romain Gasmi	(Mali) Kalifa Cissé	(Montenegro) Dragan Boškovic	(Bahrain) Jaycee John	(Zimbabwe) Mike Temwanjera
BEC Tero Sasana	(Ivory Coast) Fodé Diakité	(Montenegro) Ivan Bošković	(Ukraine) Dmitriy Gorbushin		(Indonesia) Greg Nwokolo	(Ghana) Gilbert Koomson (Serbia) Bojan Beljić (South Korea) Son Dae-ho
Buriram United	(Brazil) Diogo	(Brazil) Gilberto Macena	(Brazil) Jandson	(Venezuela) Andrés Túñez	(South Korea) Go Seul-ki	(New Zealand) Kayne Vincent
Chainat Hornbill	(Brazil) Alex	(France) Michaël Murcy	(South Korea) Jo Tae-Keun	(Japan) Kazuto Kushida	(Guam) Brandon McDonald	(North Macedonia) Borche Manevski (South Korea) Park Jung-soo
Chiangrai United	(Brazil) Fernando Abreu	(Brazil) Renan Marques	(Brazil) Renatinho	(Japan) Keita Sugimoto	(Japan) Kazuki Murakami	
Chonburi	(Brazil) Anderson	(Brazil) Juliano Mineiro	(Brazil) Leandro Assumpção	(Timor-Leste) Thiago Cunha	(South Korea) Cho Byung-kuk	
Muangthong United	(Brazil) Cleiton Silva	(North Macedonia) Mario Gjurovski	(South Korea) Kim Dong-Jin		(Japan) Naoaki Aoyama	
Nakhon Ratchasima	(England) Lee Tuck	(Germany) Björn Lindemann	(Ghana) Dominic Adiyiah	(Zambia) Noah Chivuta	(Japan) Satoshi Nagano	
Navy	(Brazil) Rodrigo Vergilio	(Brazil) Vitor Júnior	(Cameroon) David Bayiha	(Paraguay) Anggello Machuca	(Japan) Jun M. Davidson	(Australia) Michael Cvetkovski (Honduras) Georgie Welcome
Osotspa Samut Prakan	(Brazil) Addison Alves	(Brazil) Jeferson	(Brazil) Leandro	(Ivory Coast) Anthony Moura	(Indonesia) Victor Igbonefo	(Nigeria) O. J. Obatola (Timor-Leste) Diogo Rangel
Port	(New Zealand) Kayne Vincent	(South Korea) Lee Ho	(Spain) David Rochela	(Spain) Gorka Unda	(Japan) Hironori Saruta	(Australia) Brent McGrath (Ivory Coast) Diarra Ali
Ratchaburi	(Brazil) Wander Luiz	(Republic of Ireland) Andy Keogh	(Ivory Coast) Henri Jöel	(Timor-Leste) Heberty	(Japan) Genki Nagasato	(Brazil) Bruno Lopes (France) Flavien Michelini
Saraburi	(Ivory Coast) Bernard Doumbia	(Ivory Coast) Bireme Diouf	(Namibia) Sydney Urikhob	(Switzerland) Damian Bellón	(South Korea) Dai Min-Joo	(Brazil) Douglas Rodrigues (Madagascar) Guy Hubert
Sisaket	(Brazil) Victor Amaro	(Bulgaria) Lyuben Nikolov	(Nigeria) Adefolarin Durosinmi	(Nigeria) O. J. Obatola	(Iran) Mohsen Bayatinia	(Australia) Francesco Stella (Bulgaria) Gerasim Zakov
Suphanburi	(Brazil) André Luís	(Brazil) Márcio Rosário	(South Korea) Lee Seung-hee	(Spain) Carmelo González	(Indonesia) Sergio van Dijk	
TOT	(Brazil) Caihame	(England) Bas Savage	(Netherlands) Luciano Dompig	(South Korea) Lee Jun-Ki	(Japan) Takahiro Kawamura	(South Korea) Gong Tae-ha (Timor-Leste) Juninho

- Former player are the players who were out of Thai League squad/left club in the mid-season transfer window.

== League table ==
Pos	Team	Pld	W	D	L	GF	GA	GD	Pts	Qualification or relegation
1	Buriram United (C, Q)	34	25	9	0	98	24	+74	84	2016 AFC Champions League group stage
2	Muangthong United (Q)	34	21	8	5	81	35	+46	71	2016 AFC Champions League Qualifying play-off (Note: The winners of the 2015 Thai FA Cup will also qualify for the play-off of the 2016 AFC Champions League. Since the FA Cup winners have already qualified to ACL through the championship and runners-up - because the Thai FA Cup Final is between Buriram and Muangthong - the spot will be awarded to the third-placed team.)
3	Suphanburi	34	16	11	7	60	39	+21	59	
4	Chonburi (Q)	34	15	12	7	62	44	+18	57 (Note: CHO 1–0 BKU; BKU 1–1 CHO)	2016 AFC Champions League Qualifying play-off
5	Bangkok United	34	16	9	9	59	47	+12	57	
6	Bangkok Glass	34	15	11	8	47	38	+9	56	
7	Ratchaburi	34	17	4	13	48	50	−2	55	
8	Nakhon Ratchasima	34	13	10	11	37	43	−6	49	
9	Chiangrai United	34	12	8	14	42	57	−15	44	
10	Army United	34	11	8	15	43	47	−4	41	
11	Osotspa Samut Prakan	34	10	9	15	40	54	−14	39	
12	Chainat Hornbill	34	9	10	15	42	53	−11	37	
13	Sisaket	34	9	9	16	30	47	−17	36	
14	Saraburi	34	8	11	15	41	56	−15	35	Club resigned and folded
15	Navy	34	10	5	19	42	65	−23	35	
16	BEC Tero Sasana	34	7	14	13	42	51	−9	35	
17	Port (R)	34	10	3	21	31	49	−18	33	Relegation to the 2016 Thai Division 1 League
18	TOT (R)	34	3	7	24	25	71	−46	16	Relegation to the 2016 Thai Division 1 League

Updated to match(es) played on 13 December 2015. Source: Thai Premier League
Rules for classification: 1) points; 2) head-to-head points; 3) head-to-head goal difference; 4) goal difference; 5) number of goals scored
(C) Champions; (Q) Qualified for the phase indicated; (R) Relegated

== Results ==
=== Result table ===
Home \ Away	ARM	BKG	BKU	BEC	BRU	CHA	CRU	CHO	MTU	NAK	NAV	OSO	POR	RAT	SAR	SIS	SUP	TOT
Army United		0–1	1–1	1–1	1–4	1–1	5–1	1–2	2–1	0–1	1–0	1–3	1–0	3–1	4–2	1–1	0–3	0–1
Bangkok Glass	3–3		1–0	5–0	1–3	3–0	3–2	2–2	0–0	3–1	4–1	1–1	2–1	1–0	1–0	3–2	2–2	2–1
Bangkok United	2–1	2–0		3–1	0–3	1–3	0–1	1–1	3–5	3–0	5–1	1–0	2–0	0–0	4–2	2–0	4–3	6–0
BEC Tero Sasana	0–2	1–1	0–1		1–1	1–1	1–1	1–2	1–1	1–2	0–0	1–1	2–0	4–1	1–1	1–1	0–1	2–0
Buriram United	0–0	0–0	6–1	3–3		7–0	6–0	1–1	2–2	4–0	3–0	2–1	2–0	5–0	6–0	1–0	1–0	5–0
Chainat Hornbill	0–2	1–1	1–2	1–1	1–3		2–1	1–5	0–1	1–1	0–0	2–0	1–0	4–1	1–1	1–2	1–2	1–1
Chiangrai United	0–0	1–2	2–2	0–5	0–1	1–0		1–1	1–2	4–2	2–4	2–1	0–0	4–0	1–0	3–0	3–2	2–1
Chonburi	3–2	2–2	1–0	2–2	1–2	2–2	4–0		2–1	2–2	2–0	2–0	4–1	2–1	0–3	1–1	2–2	4–0
Muangthong United	2–0	5–0	1–1	1–2	1–1	2–3	4–1	4–2		2–2	7–0	2–1	1–0	3–0	2–0	1–0	2–2	3–0
Nakhon Ratchasima	4–3	1–0	1–2	1–0	1–1	2–1	0–0	1–0	0–1		2–1	2–0	0–0	2–2	1–1	1–0	1–0	2–1
Navy	2–1	0–1	2–2	2–2	1–3	0–4	1–2	1–2	1–4	2–0		0–1	1–0	0–3	2–0	3–2	1–1	4–0
Osotspa Samut Prakan	2–0	1–0	2–4	2–3	3–6	0–2	0–0	1–0	1–5	2–1	2–1		1–0	0–2	2–2	0–0	1–1	2–1
Port	0–2	0–1	1–2	2–1	1–5	1–0	2–1	3–1	1–2	1–2	1–0	3–2		0–1	2–1	2–1	0–2	2–0
Ratchaburi	2–0	1–0	4–0	1–0	1–2	1–1	0–1	3–1	0–4	1–1	1–0	3–2	1–0		3–2	5–1	1–2	1–0
Saraburi	2–1	2–0	0–0	2–1	1–2	3–2	1–1	1–3	2–4	2–0	2–1	0–0	2–2	1–2		0–0	1–3	1–1
Sisaket	0–0	0–0	1–0	2–0	0–1	2–1	1–0	1–1	1–3	1–0	2–4	1–1	2–1	0–1	1–0		2–5	1–0
Suphanburi	0–1	0–0	1–1	5–0	2–2	1–0	3–1	0–0	2–1	1–0	2–4	2–2	2–1	2–0	0–1	2–1		2–0
TOT	1–2	2–1	1–1	1–2	0–4	1–2	1–2	0–2	1–1	0–0	1–2	1–2	1–2	2–4	2–2	1–0	2–2	

Updated to match(es) played on 13 December 2015. Source: Thai Premier League
Legend: Blue = home team win; Yellow = draw; Red = away team win.

== Season statistics ==
=== Top scorers ===
As of 13 December 2015.

Rank	Player	Club	Goals
1	(Brazil) Diogo	Buriram United	33
2	(Brazil) Cleiton Silva	Muangthong United	25
3	(Brazil) Gilberto Macena	Buriram United	21
4	(North Macedonia) Mario Djurovski	Muangthong United	20
5	(Timor-Leste) Thiago Cunha	Chonburi	19
5	(Timor-Leste) Heberty	Ratchaburi	19
7	(Brazil) Alex	Chainat Hornbill	17
8	(Indonesia) Sergio van Dijk	Suphanburi	14
9	(Nigeria) Adefolarin Durosinmi	Sisaket	13
9	(Montenegro) Dragan Bošković	Bangkok United	13
9	(Thailand) Jakkapan Pornsai	Suphanburi	13

=== Top assists ===
As of 13 December 2015.

Rank	Player	Club	Assists
1	(Thailand) Theeraton Bunmathan	Buriram United	19
2	(Thailand) Jakkapan Pornsai	Suphanburi	14
3	(Thailand) Teerasil Dangda	Muangthong United	13
4	(North Macedonia) Mario Djurovski	Muangthong United	12
5	(Brazil) Gilberto Macena	Buriram United	11
5	(Brazil) André Luís	Suphanburi	11
7	(Brazil) Diogo	Buriram United	10
7	(Brazil) Cleiton Silva	Muangthong United	10
9	(Thailand) Sanrawat Dechmitr	Bangkok United	9
9	(Thailand) Chanathip Songkrasin	BEC Tero Sasana	9
9	(Thailand) Anawin Jujeen	Buriram United	9

=== Hat-tricks ===
Player	For	Against	Result	Date
(Brazil) Gilberto Macena	Buriram United	Bangkok United	6–1	2 May 2015
(Brazil) Cleiton Silva	Muangthong United	TOT	3–0	21 June 2015
(Thailand) Ronnachai Rangsiyo	Bangkok United	TOT	6–0	26 July 2015
(Brazil) Gilberto Macena	Buriram United	Chainat Hornbill	7–0	19 September 2015
(Thailand) Teerasil Dangda	Muangthong United	Navy	7–0	19 September 2015
(Thailand) Pisansin Za-in	Navy	Suphanburi	4–2	17 October 2015
(North Macedonia) Mario Gjurovski	Muangthong United	Chiangrai United	4–1	18 October 2015
(Timor-Leste) Thiago Cunha	Chonburi	Chiangrai United	4–0	24 October 2015
(North Macedonia) Mario Gjurovski	Muangthong United	Chonburi	4–2	28 October 2015
(Brazil) Diogo	Buriram United	Osotspa Samut Prakan	6–3	31 October 2015
(Brazil) Alex	Chainat Hornbill	Ratchaburi	4–1	14 November 2015
(Brazil) Diogo	Buriram United	Chiangrai United	6–0	15 November 2015
(Brazil) Diogo	Buriram United	Saraburi	6–0	6 December 2015
(Brazil) Rodrigo Vergilio	Navy	TOT	4–0	6 December 2015
(Brazil) Gilberto Macena	Buriram United	Port	5–1	13 December 2015

== Awards ==
=== Monthly awards ===
Month	Coach of the Month		Player of the Month		Reference
Month	Coach	Club	Player	Club	Reference
February	(Brazil) Stefano Cugurra	Osotspa Samut Prakan	(Thailand) Jakkaphan Pornsai	Suphanburi	
March–April	(Brazil) Alexandre Gama	Buriram United	(North Macedonia) Darko Tasevski	Bangkok Glass	
May–June	(Thailand) Issara Sritaro	Army United	(Brazil) Diogo	Buriram United	
July	(Thailand) Jadet Meelarp	Chonburi	(Thailand) Teerasil Dangda	Muangthong United	
August	(Croatia) Dragan Talajić	Muangthong United	(Thailand) Sanrawat Dechmitr	Bangkok United	
September–October	(Japan) Sugao Kambe	Nakhon Ratchasima	(Ivory Coast) Bireme Diouf	Saraburi	
November–December	(Thailand) Pairoj Borwonwatanadilok	Saraburi	(South Korea) Go Seul-ki	Buriram United	

=== Annual awards ===
==== Player of the Year ====
The Player of the Year was awarded to (Brazil) Diogo (Buriram United).

==== Coach of the Year ====
The Coach of the Year was awarded to (Brazil) Alexandre Gama (Buriram United).

==== Golden Boot ====
The Golden Boot of the Year was awarded to (Brazil) Diogo (Buriram United).

==== Fair Play ====
The Fair Play of the Year was awarded to Army United.

== Attendance ==
Pos	Team	Total	High	Low	Average	Change
1	Buriram United	332,412	33,269	12,240	19,553	+2.2%
2	Nakhon Ratchasima	300,516	34,659	8,142	17,677	+10.7%^{†}
3	Suphanburi	176,775	25,709	2,800	10,398	+7.4%
4	Muangthong United	155,863	14,980	4,230	9,168	−3.7%
5	Bangkok Glass	116,471	10,614	4,388	6,851	+5.4%
6	Chonburi	101,585	8,463	3,489	5,975	−0.9%
7	Chiangrai United	96,551	10,250	1,927	5,679	−17.8%
8	Sisaket	90,663	9,816	2,145	5,333	+21.4%
9	Chainat Hornbill	80,452	8,382	1,889	4,732	+25.1%
10	Ratchaburi	69,284	9,651	2,320	4,075	−16.8%
11	Port	68,763	6,287	2,678	4,044	+15.0%
12	BEC Tero Sasana	67,768	6,504	2,470	3,986	+7.7%
13	Navy	63,243	5,717	2,488	3,720	+52.3%^{†}
14	Saraburi	53,910	4,936	2,194	3,171	+123.2%^{†}
15	Bangkok United	47,790	6,337	1,561	2,811	+8.7%
16	Army United	44,634	5,957	1,224	2,625	+6.1%
17	Osotspa Samut Prakan	35,141	4,123	537	2,067	+8.6%
18	TOT	28,922	4,084	714	1,701	+7.9%
	League total	1,926,278	34,659	537	6,295	+25.2%

Updated to games played on 13 December 2015
Source: Thai Premier League
Notes:
^{†} Teams played previous season in Division 1

== See also ==
- 2015 Thai Division 1 League
- 2015 Regional League Division 2
- 2015 Thai FA Cup
- 2015 Thai League Cup
- 2015 Kor Royal Cup
- Thai Premier League All-Star Football
