= 2015 Thai FA Cup =

Tournament details
- Country: Thailand
- Dates: 25 February 2015 – 26 December 2015
- Teams: 73

Final positions
- Champions: Buriram United (4th title)
- Runner-up: Muangthong United

Tournament statistics
- Matches played: 72
- Goals scored: 232 (3.22 per match)
- Top goal scorer(s): Cleiton Silva; 6 goals

Awards
- Best player: Go Seul-ki

The Chang FA Cup 2015 (Thai: ช้าง เอฟเอคัพ) is the 22nd season of Thailand knockout football competition. The tournament is organized by the Football Association of Thailand.

The cup winner is guaranteed a place in the 2016 AFC Champions League Play-off.

== Calendar ==
| Round | Date | Matches | Clubs | New entries this round |
|---|---|---|---|---|
| First Round | 4 and 18 March 2015 | 9 | 5 + 11 + 2 → 9 | (5 2015 Thai Division 1 League, 11 Regional League Division 2 and 2 Other CUP) |
| Second Round | 24 June 2015 | 32 | 9 + 3 + 21 + 13 + 18 → 32 | (18 2015 Thai Premier League, 13 2015 Thai Division 1 League, 21 Regional League Division 2 and 3 Other CUP) |
| Third Round | 29 July 2015 | 16 | 32 → 16 | |
| Fourth Round | 12 August 2015 | 8 | 16 → 8 | |
| Quarter-finals Round | 23 September 2015 | 4 | 8 → 4 | |
| Semi-finals Round | 2 December 2015 | 2 | 4 → 2 | |
| Final | 26 December 2015 | 1 | 2 → 1 | |
| Total | | | | 73 clubs |

== Results ==
=== Qualification round ===
Qualification round for teams currently playing in the 2015 Thai Division 1 League, Regional League Division 2 and Other CUP level. Qualification round was held 4 March 2015.

| 4 March 2015 | Loei City | 4–0 | Globlex TWD | Loei |
| 15:30 (UTC+7) | Martins Ramsy Muwangka 4', 70'; Manorom promsuwan 44'; Pattarapol Suthidee 63' | report | | Stadium: River Side Stadium |

| 4 March 2015 | Satun United | 5–0 | Institute of Physical Education Samutsakhon | Satun |
| 15:30 (UTC+7) | Guina Bai Roland 14' (pen.); Franklin Anzité 42'; Anat Porra 86'; Julius Chukwuma 88', 90+1' | report | | Stadium: Satun Municipal Stadium |

| 4 March 2015 | Krung Thonburi | 0–1 | Ranong United | Bangkok |
| 15:30 (UTC+7) | | report | Ahmed Kotmani 72' | Stadium: Mahidol University Salaya Stadium |

| 4 March 2015 | BBC-Tero | 0–1 | Assumption United | Bangkok |
| 17:00 (UTC+7) | | report | Pitakchai Limraksa 25' | Stadium: PAT Stadium |

| 4 March 2015 | Phan Thong | 1(4) – 1(3) | Pattaya United | Chonburi |
| 17:00 (UTC+7) | Sittichok Phaso 53' | | Sivakorn Tiatrakul 90' | Stadium: Institute of Physical Education Chonburi Campus Stadium |

| 4 March 2015 | Ubon UMT United | 7–0 | Sing Ubon | Ubon Ratchathani |
| 18:00 (UTC+7) | Anukorn Sangrum 15', 44'; Ekkapoj Pongpaew 18', 37'; Jun Uruno 59'; Thongchai Rathchai 61'; Alessandro Alves 76' | report | | Stadium: Tung Burapha Stadium |

| 4 March 2015 | Samut Sakhon | 1–0 | Kaeng Khoi TRU | Samut Sakhon |
| 18:00 (UTC+7) | Piyanat Chanram 32' | report | | Stadium: Institute of Physical Education Samut Sakhon Stadium |

| 4 March 2015 | Phuket | w/o | Prachuap | Phuket |
| 19:00 (UTC+7) | | report | | Stadium: Surakul Stadium |

| 18 March 2015 | Krabi | 3(4) – 3(3) | Ayutthaya | Krabi |
| 18:00 (UTC+7) | Thirawat Lertpitchapatch 18'; Laby Kassiaty 82' (pen.); Kraisorn Sriyan 90+3' | report | Seiya Kojima 25'; Sittichai Musbu-ngor 50'; Sittichai Musbu-ngor 70' | Stadium: Krabi Stadium |

=== First round ===
First round for teams currently playing in the 2015 Thai Division 1 League, Regional League Division 2 and Other CUP level. The First round was held 24 June 2015.

| 24 June 2015 | Hua Hin City | 1(4) – 1(5) | Nonthaburi | Prachuap Khiri Khan |
| 15:00 (UTC+7) | Marques Andre Vinicius 18' | report | Wongsakorn Chikuntewin 35' | Stadium: Thanaratchata Camp Football Field |

| 24 June 2015 | Loei City | 0–4 | Suphanburi | Loei |
| 15:00 (UTC+7) | | report | Baworn Tapla 18'; André Luís 65', 79', 90+2' | Stadium: River Side Stadium |

| 24 June 2015 | Royal Thai Fleet | 2(2) – 2(4) | Krabi | Rayong |
| 15:00 (UTC+7) | Wanassanan Thana 21'; Nopphadon Tesh-On 69' | report | Anuwat Promsakul 29'; Aran Klongmodkan 73' | Stadium: Sattahip Stadium |

| 24 June 2015 | Samut Prakan | 0–2 | Bangkok Glass | Samut Prakan |
| 15:00 (UTC+7) | | report | Lazarus Kaimbi 2'; Anan Buasang 63' | Stadium: Lamfhapa Stadium |

| 24 June 2015 | Thai Honda | 2–1 | Lampang | Bangkok |
| 15:00 (UTC+7) | Nirun Janhom 81'; Pornchai Ardjinda 90+1' | report | Methi Pungpho 31' | Stadium: 72nd Anniversary Stadium |

| 24 June 2015 | Satun United | 6–0 | Nan | Satun |
| 15:30 (UTC+7) | Guina Bai Roland 18', 50', 66'; Surin Ra-Ob 35'; Julius Chukwuma 47', 80' | report | | Stadium: Satun Municipal Stadium |

| 24 June 2015 | Ratchaburi Mitrphol RBAC | 2–4 | Samut Sakhon | Ratchaburi |
| 16:00 (UTC+7) | Kim MunJu 10' (o.g.); Danilo Dos Santos 67'; Toshsaporn Phonphai 90+6' | report | Justine Prince Uche 38', 87', 90+5' (pen.) | Stadium: Paktho municipality Stadium |

| 24 June 2015 | Rangsit | 1(5) – 1(4) | Nara United | Pathum Thani |
| 17:00 (UTC+7) | Sitthichai Tumrat 52' | report | Sukree E-Tae 62' | Stadium: Leo Stadium |

| 24 June 2015 | Phan Thong | 4–0 | PTU Pathum Thani Seeker | Chonburi |
| 17:00 (UTC+7) | Prince Ampongsah 35', 56'; Athiwat Poolsawat 45'; Worachit Kanitsribampen 90+4' | report | | Stadium: Institute of Physical Education Chonburi Campus Stadium |

| 24 June 2015 | Nong Bua Pitchaya | 1(2) – 1(4) | Kamphaeng Phet | Nong Bua Lamphu |
| 17:00 (UTC+7) | Prem Lama 77' (pen.) | report | Masaki Jono 62' | Stadium: Nong Bua Lamphu Stadium |

| 24 June 2015 | Sisaket | 1–0 | Ubon UMT United | Sisaket |
| 18:00 (UTC+7) | Lyuben Nikolov 36' | report | | Stadium: Sri Nakhon Lamduan Stadium |

| 24 June 2015 | Rayong | 0–1 | Ratchaburi | Rayong |
| 18:00 (UTC+7) | | report | Genki Nagasato 81' | Stadium: Rayong Stadium |

| 24 June 2015 | Nakhon Pathom United | 2–1 | PTT Rayong | Nakhon Pathom |
| 18:00 (UTC+7) | Farid Mard-so 54'; Premwut Wongdee 77' | report | Watchara Arnumart 90+2' | Stadium: Nakhon Pathom Stadium |

| 24 June 2015 | Chainat | 4–0 | Vongchavalitkul University | Chainat |
| 18:00 (UTC+7) | Somjed Sattabut 14'; Borče Manevski 87' | report^{[usurped]} | Yudtasak Suphap 3' (o.g.); Sawas Matnok 75' (o.g.) | Stadium: Khao Plong Stadium |

| 24 June 2015 | TTM | 0(5) – 0(3) | Ranong United | Bangkok |
| 18:00 (UTC+7) | | report | | Stadium: Lad Krabang 54 Stadium |

| 24 June 2015 | Songkhla United | 3–4 | Raj Pracha | Songkhla |
| 18:00 (UTC+7) | Ekkasit Chaobutr 52'; Faysal Shayesteh 53'; Rufo Sánchez 75' | report | Apiwat Sa-Ing-Thong 24'; Pinij Chaichana 39'; Mwabuchi Okechukwu 82', 85' | Stadium: Tinsulanon Stadium |

| 24 June 2015 | Phitsanulok TSY | 1–0 | Jim Thompson Farm | Phitsanulok |
| 18:00 (UTC+7) | Pornchai Sangthong 65' | report | | Stadium: Phitsanulok Central Stadium |

| 24 June 2015 | Chiangrai United | 5–0 | Wangmun Subdistrict Administrative Organization | Chiang Rai |
| 18:00 (UTC+7) | Saharat Kanyaroj 23'; Nantawat Tansopa 45', 50'; Arthit Sunthornpit 70'; Chatchai Narkwijit 77' | report | | Stadium: United Stadium |

| 24 June 2015 | Khon Kaen United | 0–2 | SCG Muangthong United | Khon Kaen |
| 18:00 (UTC+7) | Daniel Melo 53' (o.g.) | report | Cleiton Silva 21' | Stadium: Khonkaen Sport School Stadium |

| 24 June 2015 | Osotspa | 4–1 | Uttaradit | Bangkok |
| 18:00 (UTC+7) | Addison Alves 23'; Anthony Moura 44'; OJ Obatola 72', 80' | report | Rattapong Meemanee 75' | Stadium: Thephasadin Stadium |

| 24 June 2015 | BEC Tero Sasana | 2(2) – 2(4) | Police United | Bangkok |
| 18:00 (UTC+7) | Chenrop Samphaodi 102'; Fodé Diakité 105' | report | Diego Barcelos 118'; Goran Šubara 120' | Stadium: 72-years Anniversary Stadium |

| 24 June 2015 | Samut Songkhram BTU | 1–0 | Rangsit University | Samut Songkhram |
| 18:00 (UTC+7) | Carlos Zozimar 12' | report | | Stadium: Samut Songkhram Stadium |

| 24 June 2015 | Buriram United | 3–0 (a.e.t.) | Bangkok United | Buriram |
| 18:00 (UTC+7) | Diogo 102'; Gilberto Macena 115'; Theerathon Bunmathan 117' | report | | Stadium: New I-Mobile Stadium |

| 24 June 2015 | Chiangmai | 1–3 | Air Force Central | Chiang Mai |
| 19:00 (UTC+7) | Cho Kwang-Hoon 90+3' | report | Paulo Barbosa 19'; Kittikrai Jantaraksa 84', 85' | Stadium: 700th Anniversary Stadium |

| 24 June 2015 | Nakhon Ratchasima | 2–1 | Ang Thong | Nakhon Ratchasima |
| 19:00 (UTC+7) | Lee Tuck 66' (pen.); Adisak Hantes 86' | report | Nobuhito Takahashi 62' | Stadium: 5th December Stadium |

| 24 June 2015 | Sukhothai | 2–0 | J.W. Police | Sukhothai |
| 19:00 (UTC+7) | Jirawut Saranan 45+1'; John Baggio 75' | report | | Stadium: Thung Talay Luang Stadium |

| 24 June 2015 | Phuket | 6–5 | Assumption United | Phuket |
| 19:00 (UTC+7) | Berlin Ndebe-Nlome 23', 79'; Patipat Armatantri 60'; Yusuke Sato 87' (pen.), 90+5' (pen.) | report | Sihanad Sutsak 26', 72'; Sorawit panthong 48', 80', 90+4' (pen.); Chatchai Saengdao 51' (o.g.) | Stadium: Surakul Stadium |

| 24 June 2015 | Army United | 3–0 | Kasetsart University | Bangkok |
| 19:00 (UTC+7) | Chatchai Mokkasem 38'; Mongkol Tossakrai 88'; Tanakorn Dangthong 90+1' | report | | Stadium: Royal Thai Army Stadium |

| 24 June 2015 | Bangkok | 0–1 | TOT S.C. | Bangkok |
| 19:00 (UTC+7) | | report | Parinya Pantama 82' | Stadium: 72-years Anniversary Stadium |

| 24 June 2015 | Chonburi | 1–0 | Khonkaen | Chonburi |
| 19:00 (UTC+7) | Therdsak Chaiman 55' | report | | Stadium: Chonburi Stadium |

| 24 June 2015 | Thai Port | 3–1 | BBCU | Bangkok |
| 19:00 (UTC+7) | Kayne Vincent 27'; Gorka Unda 76'; David Rochela 89' | report | Aniwat Sri-on 71' | Stadium: PAT Stadium |

| 24 June 2015 | Royal Thai Navy | w/o | Gulf Saraburi |
| – | | report |

=== Second round ===
| 29 July 2015 | Raj Pracha | 2(2) – 2(3) (a.e.t.) | Thai Honda | Bangkok |
| 15:00 (UTC+7) | Mwabuchi Okechukwu 34', 72' | report | Phantree Mad-A-dam 44'; Pornchai Ardjinda 69' | Stadium: Bangkokthonburi University Stadium |

| 29 July 2015 | Police United | 7–2 | Phan Thong | Bangkok |
| 18:00 (UTC+7) | Tana Chanabut 17', 82'; Diego Barcelos 30'; Adnan Barakat 48', 58'; Pokklaw Anan 89' | report | Luiz Eduardo 45'; Karn Jornted 60'; Jirannpong Thumsiha 80' (o.g.) | Stadium: Boonyachinda Stadium |

| 29 July 2015 | TTM | 2–4 | Sisaket | Bangkok |
| 18:00 (UTC+7) | Chanchai Nunsibud 57'; Eakarthit Somjit 80' | report | Adefolarin Durosinmi 6' (pen.), 40'; Nuttawut Khamrin 34'; Jirawat Daokhao 72' | Stadium: Lad Krabang 54 Stadium |

| 29 July 2015 | Ratchaburi | 1–0 | Satun United | Ratchaburi |
| 18:00 (UTC+7) | Wander Luiz 77' | report | | Stadium: Ratchaburi Stadium |

| 29 July 2015 | Samut Songkhram BTU | 1–0 | Nonthaburi | Samut Songkhram |
| 18:00 (UTC+7) | Heritiana Thierry 83' | report | | Stadium: Samut Songkhram Stadium |

| 29 July 2015 | Samut Sakhon | 2–3 | Chiangrai United | Samut Sakhon |
| 18:00 (UTC+7) | Kone Adama 70', 72' | report | Nantawat Tansopa 6'; Saharat Kanyaroj 64'; Arthit Sunthornpit 80' (pen.) | Stadium: Institute of Physical Education Samut Sakhon Stadium |

| 29 July 2015 | Buriram United | 2–0 | Nakhon Ratchasima | Buriram |
| 18:00 (UTC+7) | Diogo 38'; Go Seul-ki 52' | report | | Stadium: New I-Mobile Stadium |

| 29 July 2015 | Chainat | 2–0 | Phuket | Chainat |
| 18:00 (UTC+7) | Kazuto Kushida 20' | report | Natchanon Jothaworn 7' (o.g.) | Stadium: Khao Plong Stadium |

| 29 July 2015 | Krabi | 1–0 | Air Force Central | Krabi |
| 18:00 (UTC+7) | Kraisorn Sriyan 44' | report | | Stadium: Krabi Stadium |

| 29 July 2015 | Phitsanulok TSY | 1(1) – 1(3) (a.e.t.) | Kamphaeng Phet | Phitsanulok |
| 18:00 (UTC+7) | Sobze Junior Bayano 88' | report | Somsuk Poltham 14' | Stadium: Phitsanulok Central Stadium |

| 29 July 2015 | Osotspa | 3–0 (a.e.t.) | Nakhon Pathom United | Bangkok |
| 18:00 (UTC+7) | Leandro 100', 112'; Anthony Komenan 118' | report | | Stadium: Rajamangala Stadium |

| 29 July 2015 | Bangkok Glass | 3–1 | Rangsit | Pathum Thani |
| 19:00 (UTC+7) | Goshi Okubo 20'; Tossaphol Chomchon 42'; Bordin Phala 76' | report | Thammayut Rakboon 88' | Stadium: Leo Stadium |

| 29 July 2015 | Sukhothai | 1–2 | Chonburi | Sukhothai |
| 19:00 (UTC+7) | Felipe Ferreira 78' (pen.) | report | Juliano Mineiro 45+1'; Thiago Cunha 67' | Stadium: Thung Talay Luang Stadium |

| 29 July 2015 | Thai Port | 3(8) – 3(7) (a.e.t.) | TOT S.C. | Bangkok |
| 19:00 (UTC+7) | Lee Ho 37' (pen.); Brent McGrath 102' | report | Panupong Ponsa 26'; Wasan Nasuan 88' (o.g.); Kritnaphop Mekpatcharakul 90+1'; Parinya Pantama 117' | Stadium: PAT Stadium |

| 29 July 2015 | Army United | 2–0 | Suphanburi | Bangkok |
| 19:00 (UTC+7) | Kai Hirano 70'; Pichit Ketsro 72' | report | | Stadium: Royal Thai Army Stadium |

| 29 July 2015 | SCG Muangthong United | 3–1 | Royal Thai Navy | Nonthaburi |
| 19:00 (UTC+7) | Cleiton Silva 17' (pen.), 39', 90+3' (pen.) | report | Amorn Thammanarm 64' | Stadium: SCG Stadium |

=== Third Round ===
| 12 August 2015 | Sisaket | 2–3 (a.e.t.) | Chonburi | Sisaket |
| 18:00 (UTC+7) | Kittipong Wongma 58'; Adefolarin Durosinmi 103' | report | Thiago Cunha 52', 111'; Kroekrit Thaweekarn 114' | Stadium: Sri Nakhon Lamduan Stadium |

| 12 August 2015 | Chiangrai United | 2–1 | Kamphaeng Phet | Chiang Rai |
| 18:00 (UTC+7) | | report | Teerawat Lammek 47' (o.g.); Nujifon Abbulamani 81' (o.g.); Anuchit Kaewchan 90+1' | Stadium: United Stadium of Chiangrai |

| 12 August 2015 | Chainat | 3–1 | Thai Honda | Chainat |
| 18:00 (UTC+7) | Alex 20', 73'; Surachet Ngamtip 71' | report | Nirun Janhom 51' | Stadium: Khao Plong Stadium |

| 12 August 2015 | Ratchaburi | 4–2 | Samut Songkhram BTU | Ratchaburi |
| 19:00 (UTC+7) | Wander Luiz 12'; Genki Nagasato 20'; Heberty 90+7' (pen.) | report | Marc Landry Babo 43'; Sarut Nasri 67' (o.g.); Thanayuth Boonmeerit 90+1' | Stadium: The Dragons Arena |

| 12 August 2015 | Police United | 2–0 | Krabi | Bangkok |
| 19:00 (UTC+7) | Pinyo Inpinit 24'; Diego Barcelos 90+2' | report | | Stadium: Boonyachinda Stadium |

| 12 August 2015 | SCG Muangthong United | 1–0 | Osotspa | Nonthaburi |
| 19:00 (UTC+7) | Cleiton Silva 28' | report | | Stadium: SCG Stadium |

| 12 August 2015 | Army United | 2–1 | Thai Port | Bangkok |
| 19:00 (UTC+7) | Melvin de Leeuw 15'; Hassan Sunny 45+1' (o.g.); Tanakorn Dangthong 64' | report | | Stadium: Royal Thai Army Stadium |

| 12 August 2015 | Bangkok Glass | 1–3 | Buriram United | Pathum Thani |
| 19:00 (UTC+7) | Narit Taweekul 32' (o.g.); Aridane Santana 80' | report | Jakkaphan Kaewprom 49'; Andrés Túñez 59' | Stadium: Leo Stadium |

=== Quarter-finals ===
| 23 September 2015 | Chainat | 4–3 | Ratchaburi | Chainat |
| 18:00 (UTC+7) | Alex 4' (pen.), 37'; Jo Tae-Keun 37'; Surachet Ngamtip 81' | report | Heberty 21' (pen.); Genki Nagasato 90+1'; Adisak Srikampang 90+2' | Stadium: Khao Plong Stadium |

| 23 September 2015 | SCG Muangthong United | 1–0 | Chiangrai United | Nonthaburi |
| 19:00 (UTC+7) | Cleiton Silva 79' (pen.) | report | | Stadium: SCG Stadium |

| 23 September 2015 | Police United | 1–2 (a.e.t.) | Army United | Bangkok |
| 19:00 (UTC+7) | Hassan Sunny 100' (o.g.) | report | Anuwat Noicheunphan 105'; Tanakorn Dangthong 111' | Stadium: Boonyachinda Stadium |

| 23 September 2015 | Chonburi | 0–1 | Buriram United | Chonburi |
| 19:00 (UTC+7) | | report | Koravit Namwiset 61' | Stadium: Chonburi Stadium |

=== Semi-finals ===
| 2 December 2015 | Buriram United | 2–0 | Chainat | Bangkok |
| 19:00 (UTC+7) | Andrés Túñez 89', 90+5' (pen.) | Report | | Stadium: Rajamangala Stadium |

| 2 December 2015 | SCG Muangthong United | 2–1 | Army United | Pathumthani |
| 19:00 (UTC+7) | Mario Gjurovski 41'; Teerasil Dangda 90+3' | Report | Tanakorn Dangthong 83' | Stadium: Thammasat Stadium |

=== Final ===
| 26 December 2015 | Buriram United | 3–1 | SCG Muangthong United | Bangkok |
| 18:30 (UTC+7) | Andrés Túñez 45+1' (pen.); Go Seul-ki 51'; Jakkaphan Kaewprom 71' | Report | Mario Gjurovski 81' | Stadium: Supachalasai Stadium; Referee: Masaaki Toma (Japan) |

== See also ==
- 2015 Thai Premier League
- 2015 Thai Division 1 League
- 2015 Regional League Division 2
- 2015 Thai League Cup
- 2015 Kor Royal Cup
