= 2015 Mekong Club Championship =

Tournament details
- Host country: Laos; Myanmar; Cambodia; Vietnam; Thailand
- Dates: 1 November - 20 December
- Teams: 5 (from 5 associations)
- Venue: 5 (in 5 host cities)

Final positions
- Champions: (Thailand) Buriram United (1st title)
- Runners-up: (Cambodia) Boeung Ket Angkor

Tournament statistics
- Matches played: 5
- Goals scored: 18 (3.6 per match)
- Top scorer(s): (Cambodia) Chan Vathanaka (5 goals)
- Best player: (Cambodia) Chan Vathanaka

The 2015 Mekong Club Championship was the 2nd season of the Mekong Club Championship. Five teams entered as respective domestic league winners from Cambodia, Laos, Myanmar, Thailand and Vietnam. The championship is sponsored by Toyota.

== Qualified teams ==
Team	Federation	Qualification	Participation
Enter in the final
(Thailand) Buriram United	Thailand	Winners of the 2015 Thai League Cup	1st
Enter in the semi-final
(Vietnam) Becamex Bình Dương	Vietnam	Winners of the 2015 V.League 1	2nd
Enter in the first round
(Cambodia) Boeung Ket Angkor	Cambodia	Winners of the 2015 Cambodian League	1st
(Laos) Lao Toyota	Laos	Winners of the 2015 Lao Premier League	1st
(Myanmar) Yangon United	Myanmar	Winners of the 2015 Myanmar National League	1st

== Venues ==
(Cambodia) Phnom Penh	(Laos) Vientiane	(Myanmar) Yangon	(Thailand) Bangkok	(Vietnam) Hanoi
National Olympic Stadium	Chao Anouvong Stadium	Thuwunna Stadium	Supachalasai Stadium	Hàng Đẫy Stadium
Capacity: 50,000	Capacity: 15,000	Capacity: 32,000	Capacity: 19,793	Capacity: 22,500

== First round ==
- Times listed are local (UTC+7:00) and (UTC+6:30)

Pos	Team	Pld	W	D	L	GF	GA	GD	Pts	Qualification
1	(Cambodia) Boeung Ket Angkor	2	2	0	0	5	0	+5	6	Semi-final round
2	(Myanmar) Yangon United	2	1	0	1	5	5	0	3	
3	(Laos) Lao Toyota	2	0	0	2	2	7	−5	0	

1 November 2015
18:00 UTC+7

Lao Toyota (Laos)	0–2	(Cambodia) Boeung Ket Angkor
	Report	Vathanaka 44', 88'

Chao Anouvong Stadium, Vientiane
Referee: Suhaizi Shukri (Malaysia)
22 November 2015
16:00 UTC+6:30

Yangon United (Myanmar)	5–2	(Laos) Lao Toyota
Adilson 14', 21'; David Htan 50'; Kyaw Ko Ko 62'; Yan Aung Kyaw 68'	Report	Honma 47'; Pooda 90'

Thuwunna Stadium, Yangon
Attendance: 8,000
Referee: Suhaizi Shukri (Malaysia)
29 November 2015
18:30 UTC+7

Boeung Ket Angkor (Cambodia)	3–0	(Myanmar) Yangon United
Omogba 51', 87'; Ajayi 63'	Report

Olympic Stadium, Phnom Penh
Attendance: 15,290
Referee: Mohammed Jalal Uddin (Bangladesh)

== Knockout stage ==
=== Bracket ===
Semifinal			Final
			1	(Thailand) Buriram United	1
2	(Vietnam) Becamex Binh Duong	2		(Cambodia) Boeung Ket Angkor	0
3	(Cambodia) Boeung Ket Angkor	3

=== Semi-final match ===
6 December 2015
18:00 UTC+7

Becamex Binh Duong (Vietnam)	2–3	(Cambodia) Boeung Ket Angkor
Amougou 12'; Nguyễn Anh Đức 88' (pen.)	Report	Vathanaka 40' (pen.), 54', 80'

Hàng Đẫy Stadium, Hanoi
Referee: Muhammad Taqi Aljaafari Bin Jahari (Singapore)

=== Final match ===
20 December 2015
19:00 UTC+7

Buriram United (Thailand)	1–0	(Cambodia) Boeung Ket Angkor
Túñez 67' (pen.)	Report

Supachalasai Stadium, Bangkok
Referee: Mohd Amirul Izwan Yaacob (Malaysia)

== Winners ==
Mekong Club Championship 2016
Winners

Buriram United
First Title

== Goalscorers ==
5 goals

- (Cambodia) Chan Vathanaka

2 goals

- (Brazil) Adilson dos Santos
- (Nigeria) Esoh Omogba

1 goals

- (Ivory Coast) Frederic Pooda
- (Japan) Kazuo Homma
- (Myanmar) David Htan
- (Myanmar) Kyaw Ko Ko
- (Myanmar) Yan Aung Kyaw
- (Nigeria) Samuel Ajayi
- (Nigeria) Nsi Amougou
- (Venezuela) Andrés Túñez
- (Vietnam) Nguyễn Anh Đức
