= 2013 Toyota Premier Cup =

Buriram United	Nagoya Grampus
(Thailand)	(Japan)
0	2
- Date: 16 February 2013
- Venue: National Stadium, Bangkok
- Referee: (Malaysia) Suhaizi Shukri
- Weather: cloudy 35 °C (95 °F) moisture 44%

The 2013 Toyota Premier Cup featured Buriram United, the winners of the 2012 Thai League Cup against Nagoya Grampus from the 2012 J. League Division 1.

== Final ==
16 February 2013
16:15 UTC+07:00

Buriram United (Thailand)	0–2	(Japan) Nagoya Grampus
		Jungo Fujimoto 30', 82'

National Stadium, Bangkok
Referee: (Malaysia) Suhaizi Shukri

Buriram United	Nagoya Grampus

GK	1	(Thailand) Siwarak Tedsungnoen
RB	25	(Thailand) Suree Sukha		(substituted off) 23'
CB	5	(Spain) Osmar Barba (Captain)
CB	3	(Thailand) Pratum Chuthong
LB	2	(Thailand) Theeraton Bunmathan	(yellow card) 37'
CM	4	(Thailand) Charyl Chappuis
RM	23	(Thailand) Anthony Ampaipitakwong		(substituted off) 73'
LM	15	(Thailand) Surat Sukha		(substituted off) 23'
RF	17	(Thailand) Anawin Jujeen	(yellow card) 58'
CF	19	(Japan) Kai Hirano		(substituted off) 61'
LF	11	(Thailand) Ekkachai Sumrei		(substituted off) 58'
Substitutes:
GK	26	(Thailand) Yotsapon Teangdar
DF	6	(Thailand) Tanasak Srisai
DF	14	(Thailand) Chitipat Tanklang
MF	8	(Thailand) Suchao Nutnum		(substituted on) 45'
MF	13	(Thailand) Jirawat Makarom		(substituted on) 23' (substituted off) 45'
MF	18	(Thailand) Attapong Nooprom
MF	20	(South Korea) Lee Sang-min		(substituted on) 45'
MF	22	(Thailand) Adisak Kraisorn
MF	32	(Thailand) Dennis Buschening		(substituted on) 61'
FW	21	(Costa Rica) Ariel Santana		(substituted on) 58'
FW	40	(France) Goran Jerković		(substituted on) 73'
Manager:
(Thailand) Attaphol Buspakom

GK	1	(Japan) Seigo Narazaki (Captain)
RB	28	(Japan) Taishi Taguchi
CB	4	(Japan) Marcus Tulio Tanaka		(substituted off) 64'
LB	20	(Colombia) Danilson Córdoba		(substituted off) 54'
RM	3	(Japan) Yusuke Muta	(yellow card) 35'
CM	8	(Japan) Jungo Fujimoto
LM	11	(Japan) Keiji Tamada		(substituted off) 64'
CM	22	(Brazil) Daniel Silva dos Santos	(yellow card) 67'
AM	10	(Japan) Yoshizumi Ogawa		(substituted off) 45'
LW	19	(Japan) Kisho Yano		(substituted off) 45'
CF	9	(North Macedonia) Nikola Jakimovski		(substituted off) 56'
Substitutes:
GK	50	(Japan) Yoshinari Takagi
DF	5	(Japan) Takahiro Masukawa		(substituted on) 64'
DF	6	(Japan) Shohei Abe		(substituted on) 45'
DF	32	(Japan) Hayuma Tanaka	(yellow card) 76'	(substituted on) 64'
MF	7	(Japan) Naoshi Nakamura	(yellow card) 70'	(substituted on) 56'
MF	13	(Japan) Ryota Isomura		(substituted on) 54'
MF	27	(Japan) Ryota Tanabe		(substituted on) 45'
FW	16	(Australia) Joshua Kennedy
Manager:
(Serbia) Dragan Stojković

Assistant referees:
(Thailand) Sumate Saiwaew
(Thailand) Anuwat Fheemouchang
Fourth official:

Match rules:

- 90 minutes.
- Penalty shoot-out if scores still level.
- Maximum of six substitutions.
