= Yotsapon Teangdar =

Thai footballer (born 1992)

Personal information
- Full name: Yotsapon Teangdar
- Date of birth: 6 April 1992 (age 34)
- Place of birth: Surin, Thailand
- Height: 1.78 m (5 ft 10 in)
- Position: Goalkeeper

Youth career
- 2010–2011: Buriram PEA

Senior career*
Years	Team	Apps	(Gls)
2011–2024	Buriram United	3	(0)
2011	→ Surin City (loan)	16	(0)
2016	→ Khon Kaen United (loan)	10	(0)
2021–2022	→ Khon Kaen United (loan)	25	(0)
2023	→ Ayutthaya United (loan)	3	(0)
2024	→ Police Tero (loan)	8	(0)
Total		65	(0)
- * Club domestic league appearances and goals as of 30 April 2023

Yotsapon Teangdar (Thai: ยศพล เทียงดาห์; born 6 April 1992), simply known as Toey (Thai: เต้ย), is a Thai retired professional footballer who plays as a goalkeeper.

== Club career ==
Yotsapon Teangdar is from Prasat district of Surin province. He attended secondary school at Prasat Wittayakarn School, where he won several national competitions with the school's football team. He was selected for Thailand's National U-16 Team for the 2008 AFC U-16 Championship, and briefly joined Surin before signing with Buriram PEA's youth team in 2010.

He spent his first year on loan to Surin, before joining Buriram's senior team as a second substitute (Siwarak Tedsungnoen was the team's main goalkeeper). In 2012, Yotsapon was sent to train with Leicester City in England for six months. He made a few appearances for Buriram in the 2012 Thai Premier League.

With Buriram, Yotsapon continued to serve as a substitute, making a few appearances with the B team, including their AFC Champions League match against Shandong Luneng on 4 May 2016. He also spent some seasons on loan to Phichit and Khon Kaen United in the Thai Division 1 League and Regional League Division 2.

== Honours ==
=== Club ===
Buriram United

- Thai League 1
  - Champions (5) : 2013, 2014, 2015, 2017, 2018
- Thai FA Cup
  - Winners (2) : 2013, 2015
- Thai League Cup
  - Winners (3) : 2013, 2015, 2016
- Thailand Champions Cup
  - Champions (1) : 2019
- Toyota Premier Cup
  - Winner (2) : 2014, 2016
- Kor Royal Cup
  - Winners (4) : 2013, 2014, 2015, 2016
- Mekong Club Championship
  - Winner (1) : 2015, 2016
