= Jakkaphan Kaewprom =

Thai footballer (born 1988)

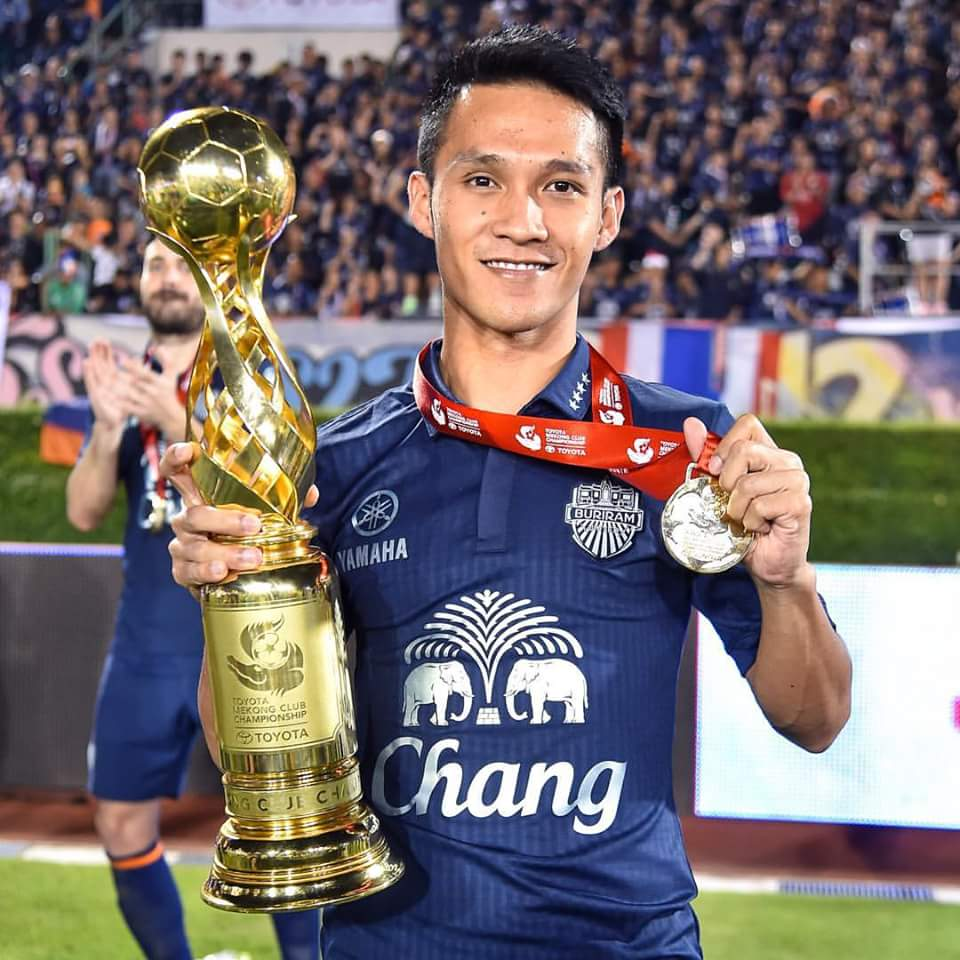
- Kaewprom with Buriram United in 2016

Personal information
- Full name: Jakkaphan Kaewprom
- Date of birth: 24 May 1988 (age 38)
- Place of birth: Buriram, Thailand
- Height: 1.70 m (5 ft 7 in)
- Position: Midfielder

Team information
- Current team: Port

Youth career
- 2004–2006: Suphanburi Sport School

Senior career*
Years	Team	Apps	(Gls)
2007–2009	BEC Tero Sasana	54	(7)
2010–2011	Muangthong United	35	(4)
2011–2022	Buriram United	193	(18)
2022–2026	Ratchaburi	104	(12)
2026–	Port	0	(0)

International career^{‡}
2008–2022	Thailand	21	(2)
- * Club domestic league appearances and goals as of 9 January 2026 ‡ National team caps and goals as of 15 June 2021

Jakkaphan Kaewprom (Thai: จักรพันธ์ แก้วพรม, born May 24, 1988) is a Thai professional footballer who plays as a midfielder for Thai League 1 club Port.

== Club career ==
=== BEC Tero Sasana ===
Jakkaphan started his professional career with BEC Tero Sasana. In BEC Tero he was converted to right back and right midfielder, because at that time there were enough center midfielders in the team.

=== Muangthong United ===
In 2011, he moved to Muangthong United where he played very well, he won the 2010 Thai Premier League. Buriram PEA which is now Buriram United bought him from Muangthong United.

=== Buriram United ===
He was convinced to play for Buriram because he is from Buriram. He suddenly became Buriram's main player, after scoring goals and assisted as well. He was a big part of Buriram's treble in 2011.

At the start of the 2013 Thai Premier League he picked up an injury on his ACL. Although he was injured Buriram extended his contract. He came back to field in the second leg of the 2013 Thai Premier League. His form dramatically came back to normal after his injury.

== International career ==
On the back of performing extremely well in the Thailand Premier League, Jakkaphan was called up to the full national side in coach Peter Reid's first squad announcement. He was called up with 30 other players to the 2008 AFF Suzuki Cup.

His first international goal is from the match that Thailand won Palestine 1–0 in 2014 FIFA World Cup qualification (AFC). Jakkraphan played as a right back for Thailand against Australia in the 2014 FIFA World Cup qualification (AFC), in the following game his cross assisted Teerasil Dangda.

In 2013, he was called up to the national team by Surachai Jaturapattarapong to the 2015 AFC Asian Cup qualification. In October, 2013 he played a friendly match against Bahrain. He got injured early in the following match, and got substituted by Chatree Chimtalay.

=== International goals ===
Scores and results list Thailand's goal tally first.

#	Date	Venue	Opponent	Score	Result	Competition
1.	23 July 2011	Chang Arena, Buriram, Thailand	Palestine	1–0	1–0	2014 FIFA World Cup qualification
2.	25 March 2018	Rajamangala National Stadium, Bangkok, Thailand	Slovakia	1–2	2–3	2018 King's Cup

== Style of play ==
Jakkaphan is described as a fast pace player who delivers good crosses and passes. Even though his main position is a midfielder, he could play right back and right midfielder very well.

== Honours ==
=== Club ===
Muangthong United

- Thai Premier League (1): 2010

Buriram United

- Thai League 1 (7): 2011, 2013, 2014, 2015, 2017, 2018, 2021–22
- Thai FA Cup (5): 2011, 2012, 2013, 2015, 2021–22
- Thai League Cup (6): 2011, 2012, 2013, 2015, 2016, 2021–22
- Thailand Champions Cup (1): 2019
- Kor Royal Cup (4): 2013, 2014, 2015, 2016
- Mekong Club Championship (2): 2015, 2016
- Toyota Premier Cup (3): 2012, 2014, 2016

=== Individual ===
- Thai Premier League Player of the Month (1): June 2014
- Thai League 1 Player of the Year (1): 2017, 2024–25
- Thai League 1 Best XI: 2020–21

== Royal decoration ==
- 2009 - Member (Fifth Class) of The Most Admirable Order of the Direkgunabhorn
