= Toyota Cup =

Toyota Cup may refer to:

- Toyota Cup (Philadelphia Flyers), an award given annually by the Philadelphia Flyers
- Intercontinental Cup (1960–2004), an official UEFA and CONMEBOL club competition known as European/South American Cup from 1960 to 1979 and since 1980 as the Toyota Cup.
- National Youth Competition (rugby league), formerly known as the Toyota Cup, an Australian rugby league competition
- Toyota Premier Cup, a defunct football cup competition hold in Thailand
