= Chitipat Tanklang =

Thai footballer (born 1991)

Personal information
- Full name: Chitipat Tanklang
- Date of birth: 11 August 1991 (age 35)
- Place of birth: Bangkok, Thailand
- Height: 1.83 m (6 ft 0 in)
- Position: Centre back

Youth career
- 2003: Bangkok Sports School
- 2004–2008: Suankularb Wittayalai School
- 2009–2011: Buriram United

Senior career*
Years	Team	Apps	(Gls)
2012–2024	Buriram United	168	(4)
Total		168	(4)

International career
2013–2014	Thailand U23	4	(1)
- * Club domestic league appearances and goals as of 17 March 2019

Chitipat Tanklang (Thai: ชิติพัทธ์ เเทนกลาง; born August 11, 1991) is a Thai retired professional footballer who plays as a centre back.

== International career ==
He represented Thailand U23 in the 2014 Asian Games.

== Honours ==
Buriram United

- Thai League 1 (8): 2013, 2014, 2015, 2017, 2018, 2021–22, 2022–23, 2023–24
- Thai FA Cup (4): 2013, 2015, 2021–22, 2022–23
- Thai League Cup (5): 2013, 2015, 2016, 2021–22, 2022–23
- Thailand Champions Cup (1): 2019
- Toyota Premier Cup (2): 2014, 2016
- Kor Royal Cup (4): 2013, 2014, 2015, 2016
- Mekong Club Championship (2): 2015, 2016
