= Anawin Jujeen =

Thai footballer (born 1987)

Personal information
- Full name: Anawin Jujeen
- Date of birth: 13 March 1987 (age 39)
- Place of birth: Nakhon Sawan, Thailand
- Height: 1.71 m (5 ft 7 1/2 in)
- Positions: Right back; winger

Team information
- Current team: Chattrakan City
- Number: 18

Youth career
- 2003–2005: Angthong Sports School
- 2006: Krung Thai Bank

Senior career*
Years	Team	Apps	(Gls)
2007–2012	Bangkok Glass	108	(14)
2013–2016	Buriram United	110	(12)
2017–2018	Suphanburi	33	(3)
2018–2019	PTT Rayong	21	(1)
2020	Petaling Jaya City	8	(1)
2020–2022	PT Prachuap	18	(0)
2022	Udon Thani	14	(1)
2022–2023	Dragon Pathumwan Kanchanaburi	33	(2)
2024–2025	Nongbua Pitchaya	35	(0)
2025–	Chattrakan City	21	(4)

International career^{‡}
2006–2007	Thailand U20	4	(0)
2009–2010	Thailand U23	8	(3)
2010–2014	Thailand	5	(0)
- * Club domestic league appearances and goals as of 24 December 2023 ‡ National team caps and goals as of 24 November 2017

Anawin Jujeen (Thai: อนาวิน จูจีน, born March 13, 1987) is a Thai professional footballer who plays as a right back for Chattrakan City of the Thai League 3. He was the runner-up of Pepsi World Challenge 2006 with Wisoot Bunpeng.

He played for Krung Thai Bank F.C.in the 2008 AFC Champions League group stages.

== Club career ==
Anawin played for Krung Thai Bank until the club changed to Bangkok Glass He was a regular starter for Bangkok Glass F.C., playing as an attacking midfielder or a right midfielder.

In 2013, he moved to Buriram United for an undisclosed fee. Transfer fee believe around ฿ 2.5 to 5 million. He normally plays as a right back and sometimes as a right midfielder in Buriram United.

Anawin played in the 2013 AFC Champions League. He was a starter for playing for Buriram in the 2013 AFC Champions League against Vegalta Sendai, FC Seoul. He came in as a substitute against Jiangsu Sainty and received a red card after getting two yellow cards in the game. After advancing to the knockout phase Anawin scored a header against Bunyodkor at Buriram. He came in as a substitute for the remaining games against Bunyodkor and Esteghlal.

== International career ==
On December 4, 2009, Anawin debuted for Thailand U23 at the 2009 Southeast Asian Games at Laos against Vietnam U23. He also scored his first and second goal for Thailand U23 against Timor-Leste U23 at the 2009 Southeast Asian Games. Anawin played for Thailand U23 in the 2010 Asian Games at Guangzhou, China, and scored a goal against Pakistan U23.

In 2014, he was called up to the national team by Kiatisuk Senamuang to play in the 2015 AFC Asian Cup qualification.

=== International ===
As of 12 November 2015

National team	Year	Apps	Goals
Thailand	2010	4	0
Thailand	2014	1	0
Thailand	Total	5	0

=== International goals ===
==== under-23 ====
Anawin Jujeen – goals for Thailand U23
1.	8 December 2009	Vientiane, Laos	Timor-Leste	0–9	Won	2009 Southeast Asian Games
2.	8 December 2009	Vientiane, Laos	Timor-Leste	0–9	Won	2009 Southeast Asian Games
3.	7 November 2010	Guangzhou, China	Pakistan	6–0	Won	2010 Asian Games

== Honours ==
=== Clubs ===
Bangkok Glass

- Queen's Cup: 2010
- Singapore Cup: 2010

Buriram United

- Thai Premier League: 2013, 2014, 2015
- Thai FA Cup: 2013, 2015
- Thai League Cup: 2013, 2015
- Toyota Premier Cup: 2014, 2016
- Kor Royal Cup: 2013, 2014, 2015, 2016
- Mekong Club Championship: 2015, 2016

Dragon Pathumwan Kanchanaburi

- Thai League 3 Western Region: 2022–23
