= Alexandre Gama =

Brazilian football manager

Personal information
- Full name: Alexandre Torreira da Gama Lima Casado
- Date of birth: 4 January 1968 (age 58)
- Place of birth: Rio de Janeiro, Brazil
- Height: 1.75 m (5 ft 9 in)
- Position: Midfielder

Team information
- Current team: Uthai Thani (head coach)

Youth career
- 1983–1990: Fluminense

Senior career*
Years	Team	Apps	(Gls)
1989–1990	Fluminense	3	(0)
1990–1991	Bragantino		
1991	América de Três Rios		
1993	São José-SP		

Managerial career
- 2002–2004: Fluminense (youth)
- 2004: Fluminense
- 2005: Inter de Limeira
- 2005–2006: Fluminense (youth)
- 2006–2008: Al-Wahda
- 2008: Macaé
- 2008: Volta Redonda
- 2009–2010: Gyeongnam (assistant)
- 2011: South Korea (assistant)
- 2013: Madureira
- 2014: Al-Shahaniya
- 2014–2016: Buriram United
- 2016–2018: Chiangrai United
- 2018: Thailand U21
- 2018–2019: Thailand U23
- 2019–2020: Muangthong United
- 2020–2021: Buriram United
- 2022: Daegu FC
- 2022–2025: Lamphun Warriors
- 2025–2026: Port
- 2026–: Uthai Thani
- * Club domestic league appearances and goals as of 02:00, 26 October 2020 (UTC)

Alexandre Torreira da Gama Lima Casado (born 4 January 1968) is a Brazilian professional football manager and former player. He is currently the head coach of the Thai League 1 club, Uthai Thani.

== Playing career ==
As a player, Alexandre Gama was known as "GAMA", started his career in the youth categories of Fluminense in 1983, where he was champion of Rio de Janeiro in 1988 and of the São Paulo Junior Cup in 1989, from that first conquest, he started to make part of the professional squad and participated in the 1990 Rio Cup triumph. Shortly after, he was sold to Bragantino. Gama was part of the team that won the Paulista championship that year and reached the final of the Brazilian championship in 1991. He then went to Europe, where he played until the end of his career.

== Managerial career ==
In 2002, he started his career as a coach in the youth division of Fluminense, being Carioca Children's Champion, reaching the interim training of the main team with the departure of Robertinho. He would return to command the Tricolor das Laranjeiras in 2004, assuming the team in place of Ricardo Gomes. When he took over, the team was in the penultimate position of the Brazilian Championship. Players included Romário, Edmundo, Ramon, Roger, and Leonardo Moura. The team finished the competition in 9th place, qualifying for the 2005 South American Cup.

After a short stint at Inter de Limeira, he returned to training the youth teams of Fluminense between 2005 and 2006. He became the World Junior Champion in 2005 in a tournament held in the United Arab Emirates. He started to work when he took over Al Wahda FC in 2006. In Brazil in 2008, he commanded two clubs in Rio de Janeiro: Macaé, Volta Redonda where he left and returned Asian football, to coach Gyeongnam FC, from South Korea.

He was also assistant coach of the South Korean team in 2012 and during the qualifiers for the 2014 World Cup in Brazil. In a new return to Brazil in 2013, he trained Madureira (Campeonato Carioca and Série D do Brasileiro) and Duque de Caxias. In that period, he was elected the 3rd best coach of the Campeonato Carioca de 2013.

He left Brazil again at the beginning of 2014 to train Al-Shahaniya, from Qatar. He obtained the club's access to the First Division after 33 years of failed attempts. He was then hired by lo Buriram United where he was twice national champion between 2014 and 2015. He then won 6 more titles.

He stayed Buriram until 2016 and in 2017 went to Chiangrai United. His new mission was to turn the team into a winning team and winning the first title in its history. In the first year, he managed to become champion of the Chang FA Cup. In the following year, he won the Kor Royal Cup. He left the club at the end of 2018, with 4 titles won.

He took over the Thai Olympic Team with the mission of taking the country to the 2020 Olympics in Tokyo. He was in charge of the team for about 6 months until he received a proposal to take over the Muangthong United team. This team had 12 titles won in 14 disputed finals. In 2015, he was elected the best Thai coach among all sports practiced in the country.

== Managerial statistics ==
As of match played 21 November 2026

Managerial record by team and tenure
Team	Nat.	From	To	Record					Ref.
Team	Nat.	From	To	G	W	D	L	Win %	Ref.
Fluminense	(Brazil)	18 August 2004	20 December 2004	17	9	5	3	52.94	
Al-Wahda	(United Arab Emirates)	1 July 2006	30 June 2008	9	4	4	1	44.44	
Madureira	(Brazil)	1 January 2013	31 December 2013	33	8	15	10	24.24	
Buriram United	(Thailand)	8 June 2014	22 May 2016	85	54	19	12	63.53	
Chiangrai United	(Thailand)	20 October 2016	27 October 2018	92	51	20	21	55.43	
Thailand U21	(Thailand)	1 November 2018	30 November 2018	3	0	1	2	0.00	
Thailand U23	(Thailand)	1 November 2018	11 June 2019	10	4	3	3	40.00	
Muangthong United	(Thailand)	12 June 2019	17 October 2020	27	15	3	9	55.56	
Buriram United	(Thailand)	22 October 2020	28 November 2021	43	31	5	7	72.09	
Daegu	(South Korea)	22 December 2021	14 August 2022	36	10	15	11	27.78	
Lamphun Warriors	(Thailand)	17 November 2022	31 May 2025	95	37	24	34	38.95	
Port	(Thailand)	1 June 2025	14 May 2026	26	15	4	7	57.69	
Uthai Thani	(Thailand)	8 June 2026	Present	10	5	2	3	50.00	
Career Total				486	243	120	123	50.00	

== Honours ==
=== Assistant manager ===
South Korea

- AFC Asian Cup: 2011 (3rd place)

=== Manager ===
Al-Wahda

- UAE Arabian Gulf League: 2006 (2nd place)
- UAE President's Cup: 2007 (2nd place)
- AFC Champions League: 2007 (3rd place)

Buriram United

- Thai Premier League: 2014, 2015
- Thai FA Cup: 2015
- Thai League Cup: 2015
- Kor Royal Cup: 2015, 2016
- Premier Cup: 2016
- Mekong Club Championship: 2015

Chiangrai United

- Thai FA Cup: 2017, 2018
- Thai League Cup: 2018
- Thailand Champions Cup: 2018

Lamphun Warriors

- Thai League Cup runner-up: 2024–25

Individual

- Thai Premier League/Thai League 1 Coach of the Month: March–April 2015, July 2019, March 2021, October 2021, February 2025, October 2025
- Thai Premier League Coach of the Year: 2015
