= Suchao Nuchnum =

Thai footballer (born 1983)

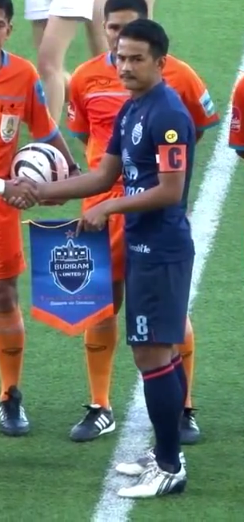
- Suchao is the behind referee Prapoj Dissomsri in Bangkok Glass vs Buriram UTD game in 2013 Toyota Thai Premier League.

Personal information
- Full name: Suchao Nuchnum
- Date of birth: 17 May 1983 (age 43)
- Place of birth: Sai Yok, Kanchanaburi, Thailand
- Height: 1.70 m (5 ft 7 in)
- Position: Midfielder

Team information
- Current team: Thailand U17 (assistant coach)

Youth career
- 1999–2001: Kanchanaburi Technical College
- 2002: TOT

Senior career*
Years	Team	Apps	(Gls)
2003–2010	TOT	90	(21)
2009–2010	→ Persib Bandung (loan)	17	(3)
2010–2019	Buriram United	156	(14)
2020–2022	Muangkan United	71	(13)
2022–2024	Kanchanaburi City	30	(7)
2024–2026	Kanchanaburi Power	15	(0)
Total		379	(58)

International career^{‡}
2005–2006	Thailand U23	12	(5)
2005–2013	Thailand	58	(6)

Managerial career
- 2026–: Thailand U17 (assistant)
Medal record
Thailand U23
Sea Games
Gold medal – first place	Sea Games 2005	Football
Thailand
Asean Football Championship
Runner-up	AFF Suzuki Cup 2007	2007
Runner-up	AFF Suzuki Cup 2008	2008
- * Club domestic league appearances and goals as of 9 October 2024 (UTC) ‡ National team caps and goals as of 04:07, 3 February 2025 (UTC)

Suchao Nuchnum (Thai: สุเชาว์ นุชนุ่ม, born 17 May 1983), is a Thai football manager and retired professional footballer. He is currently assistant coach Thailand U17.

== Club career ==
Before becoming a footballer, Suchao was a Muay Thai boxer. His ring name of "Kobnoi Sor. Sakunpan" (กบน้อย ส.สกุลภัณฑ์) led to his nickname of "Kob" (กบ; literally "frog"). Suchao spent his youth career with TOT S.C. starting from the 2002-2003 season. He later signed his first professional contract with the club and made his first senior appearance in 2004. He totally spent 5 years with the club until 2009, made 84 appearances with 33 goals before moving abroad to Indonesian club, Persib Bandung.

The winger played a season with the Indonesians before returning to his homeland's club, Buriram United F.C. (was Buriram PEA at the time). Suchao was promoted to captain and has been playing regularly for the team in different matches.

== International career ==
Suchao Nuchnum was first called up for the U-23 squad in 2005 before promoted to senior squad later in the same year. He was part of the 2010 AFF Suzuki Cup squad. In 2013, he was called up to the national team by Surachai Jaturapattarapong to the 2015 AFC Asian Cup qualification.

== International goals ==
#	Date	Venue	Opponent	Score	Result	Competition
1.	28 December 2006	Bangkok, Thailand	Kazakhstan	2–2	Draw	2006 King's Cup
2.	30 December 2006	Bangkok, Thailand	Vietnam	3–1	Win	2006 King's Cup - Final
3.	12 January 2007	Bangkok, Thailand	Myanmar	1–1	Draw	2007 ASEAN Football Championship (Group-Stage)
4.	20 May 2008	Bangkok, Thailand	Nepal	7–0	Win	Friendly
5.	6 December 2008	Phuket, Thailand	Vietnam	2–0	Win	2008 AFF Suzuki Cup (Group-Stage)
6.	21 January 2009	Phuket, Thailand	Lebanon	2–1	Win	2009 King's Cup

== Honours ==
=== Club ===
TOT

- Thai Division 1 League (1): 2003
- Provincial League (1): 2006

Buriram United

- Thai League 1 (6): 2011 2013 2014, 2015, 2017, 2018
- Thai FA Cup (4): 2011, 2012, 2013, 2015
- Thai League Cup (5): 2011, 2012, 2013, 2015, 2016
- Thailand Champions Cup (1): 2019
- Toyota Premier Cup (3): 2012, 2014, 2016
- Kor Royal Cup (4): 2013, 2014, 2015 2016
- Mekong Club Championship (1): 2015

=== International ===
Thailand U-23

- Sea Games Gold Medal (1); 2005

Thailand

- King's Cup (2): 2006, 2007
- T&T Cup (1): 2008

=== Individual ===
- Thai Premier League Player of the Month (1): October 2014
- Thai Premier League Player of the Year (1): 2014
