= 2017 Toyota Premier Cup =

SCG Muangthong United	Sanfrecce Hiroshima
(Thailand)	(Japan)
1	3
- Date: 4 February 2017
- Venue: National Stadium, Bangkok
- Man of the Match: Masato Kudo
- Referee: Kim Dong-jin (South Korea)
- Attendance: 15,800
- Weather: partly cloudy 31 °C (88 °F) humidity 58%

The 2017 Toyota Premier Cup was the 7th Toyota Premier Cup. It's a single-game cup competition organized by the Toyota and Football Association of Thailand. It features SCG Muangthong United the winners of the 2016 Thai League Cup and Sanfrecce Hiroshima as an invited team from the 2016 J1 League (Japan). Competition features at National Stadium, Bangkok and sponsored by Toyota.

== Qualified teams ==
Team	Qualification	Qualified date	Participation
(Thailand) SCG Muangthong United	Winners of the 2016 Thai League Cup	14 October 2016	1st
(Japan) Sanfrecce Hiroshima	Invited team from the 2016 J1 League	8 January 2017	1st

== Match ==
=== Details ===
4 February 2017
19:00 UTC+7

SCG Muangthong United (Thailand)	1–3	(Japan) Sanfrecce Hiroshima
Teerasil 85'	Report; Highlight	Masato 57', 62'; Felipe 67' (pen.)

National Stadium, Bangkok
Attendance: 15,800
Referee: Kim Dong-jin (South Korea)

SCG Muangthong United	Sanfrecce Hiroshima

Lineups:
GK	1	(Thailand) Kawin Thamsatchanan
DF	3	(Thailand) Theerathon Bunmathan		(substituted off) 80'
DF	4	(Spain) Mario Abrante
DF	5	(Japan) Naoaki Aoyama
DF	19	(Thailand) Tristan Do		(substituted off) 75'
MF	6	(Thailand) Sarach Yooyen
MF	18	(Thailand) Chanathip Songkrasin		(substituted off) 75'
MF	34	(Thailand) Wattana Playnum
FW	9	(Spain) Xisco Jiménez		(substituted off) 59'
FW	10	(Thailand) Teerasil Dangda (c)	85'
FW	23	(Brazil) Cleiton Silva
Substitutes:
GK	28	(Thailand) Prasit Padungchok
DF	2	(Thailand) Peerapat Notchaiya		(substituted on) 80'
DF	25	(Thailand) Adison Promrak		(substituted on) 59'
DF	26	(Thailand) Suphan Thongsong
MF	13	(Thailand) Ratchapol Nawanno
MF	16	(Thailand) Sanukran Thinjom
MF	22	(Thailand) Mongkol Tossakrai		(substituted on) 75'
MF	33	(Thailand) Pitakpong Kulasuwan
FW	11	(Thailand) Adisak Kraisorn		(substituted on) 75'
Head Coach:
(Thailand) Totchtawan Sripan

Lineups:
GK	21	(Japan) Ryotaro Hironaga
DF	4	(Japan) Hiroki Mizumoto			(substituted off) 73'
DF	5	(Japan) Kazuhiko Chiba
DF	33	(Japan) Tsukasa Shiotani		(yellow card) 50'
MF	6	(Japan) Toshihiro Aoyama (c)
MF	10	(Brazil) Felipe Silva	67' (pen.)	(yellow card) 52'	(substituted off) 88'
MF	14	(Croatia) Mihael Mikić			(substituted off) 67'
MF	15	(Japan) Sho Inagaki			(substituted off) 81'
MF	18	(Japan) Yoshifumi Kashiwa
FW	44	(Brazil) Anderson Lopes			(substituted off) 73'
FW	50	(Japan) Masato Kudo	57', 62'
Substitutes:
GK	34	(Japan) Hirotsugu Nakabayashi
DF	2	(Japan) Yuki Nogami			(substituted on) 73'
DF	3	(Japan) Soya Takahashi			(substituted on) 67'
MF	7	(Japan) Yusuke Chajima			(substituted on) 88'
MF	16	(Japan) Kohei Shimizu
MF	28	(Japan) Takuya Marutani			(substituted on) 81'
MF	29	(Japan) Tsukasa Morishima
FW	22	(Japan) Yusuke Minagawa
FW	31	(Japan) Takumi Miyayoshi			(substituted on) 73'
Head Coach:
(Japan) Hajime Moriyasu

Assistant referees:
(South Korea) Park In-sun
(South Korea) Bang Ki-yeol
Fourth official:
(Thailand) Chaireag Ngamsom
Match Commissioner:
(Thailand) Weerayut Sirisap
Referee Assessor:
(Thailand) Sakdarin Suwanjira
General Coordinator:
(Thailand) Ekapol Polnavee
Media Officer:
(Thailand) Anuwat Phandinthong

MATCH RULES

- 90 minutes.
- Penalty shoot-out if necessary.
- Maximum of six substitutions.

=== Statistics ===
First half
Statistic	SCG Muangthong United	Sanfrecce Hiroshima
Goals scored	0	0
Total shots	6	7
Shots on target	4	2
Saves	2	4
Ball possession	54%	46%
Corner kicks	2	1
Fouls committed	5	7
Offsides	0	1
Yellow cards	0	0
Red cards	0	0

Second half
Statistic	SCG Muangthong United	Sanfrecce Hiroshima
Goals scored	1	3
Total shots	7	7
Shots on target	4	3
Saves	0	3
Ball possession	48%	52%
Corner kicks	2	1
Fouls committed	3	7
Offsides	2	0
Yellow cards	0	2
Red cards	0	0

Overall
Statistic	SCG Muangthong United	Sanfrecce Hiroshima
Goals scored	1	3
Total shots	13	14
Shots on target	8	5
Saves	5	8
Ball possession	51%	49%
Corner kicks	4	2
Fouls committed	8	14
Offsides	2	1
Yellow cards	0	2
Red cards	0	0

== Winner ==
2017 Toyota Premier Cup
winners

First title

=== Prizes for winner ===
- A champion trophy.
- 1,000,000 THB prize money.
- A car, Toyota Corolla Altis ESPORT.

=== Prizes for runners-up ===
- 500,000 THB prize money.
