= Theerathon Bunmathan =

Thai footballer (born 1990)

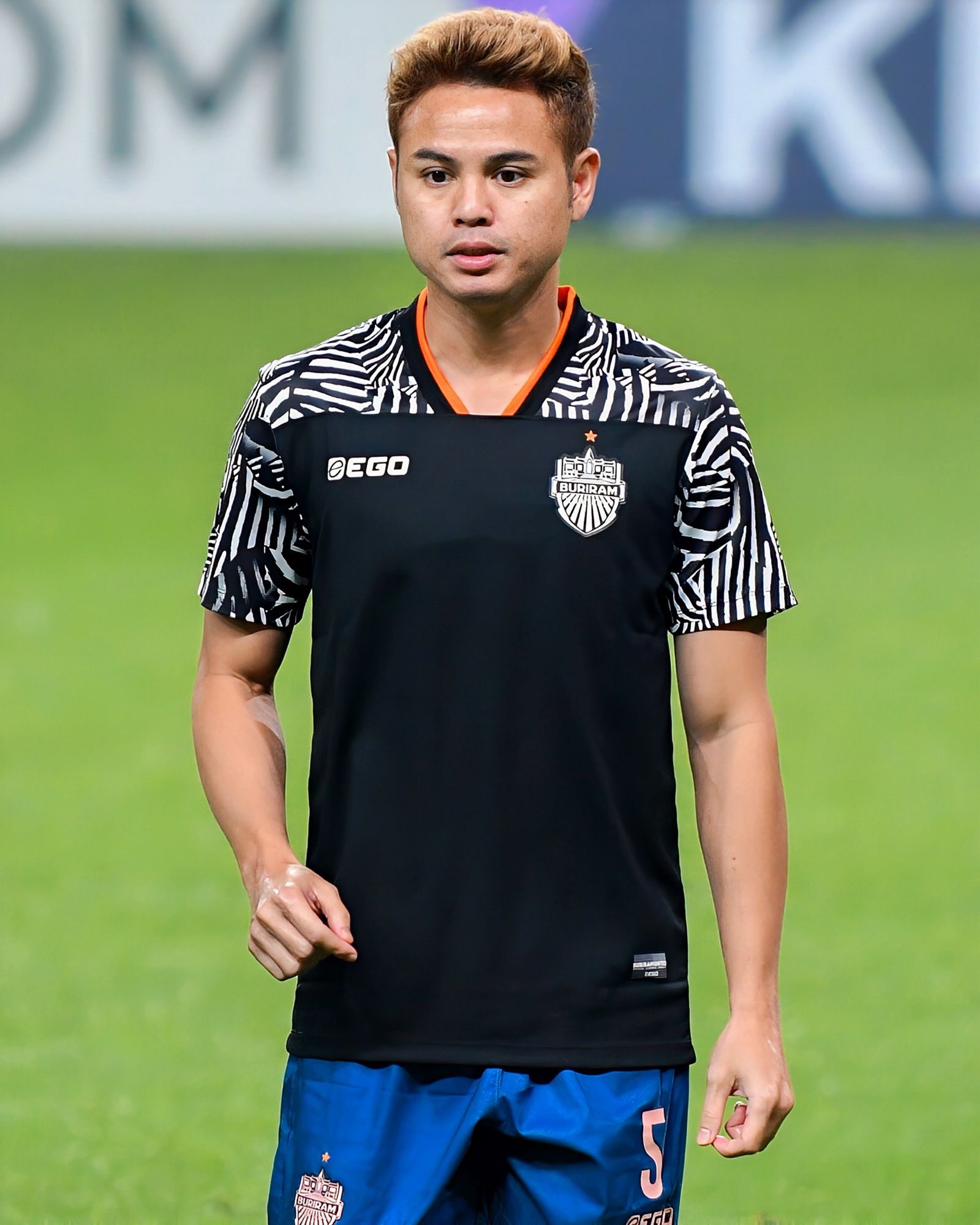
- Theerathon with Buriram United in 2025

Personal information
- Full name: Theerathon Bunmathan
- Date of birth: 6 February 1990 (age 36)
- Place of birth: Nonthaburi, Thailand
- Height: 1.71 m (5 ft 7 in)
- Positions: Left back; midfielder

Team information
- Current team: Buriram United
- Number: 55

Youth career
- 2002–2004: Bangkok Sports School
- 2005–2007: Assumption College Thonburi

Senior career*
Years	Team	Apps	(Gls)
2008	Rajpracha	10	(0)
2009–2016	Buriram United	218	(15)
2016–2020	Muangthong United	42	(9)
2018	→ Vissel Kobe (loan)	28	(0)
2019	→ Yokohama F. Marinos (loan)	25	(3)
2020–2021	Yokohama F. Marinos	53	(2)
2021–	Buriram United	113	(7)

International career^{‡}
2008–2009	Thailand U19	6	(0)
2009–2013	Thailand U23	15	(1)
2010–	Thailand	102	(9)
Medal record
Thailand under-23
Sea Games
Gold medal – first place	Sea Games 2013	Football
Thailand
Asean Football Championship
Runner-up	AFF Suzuki Cup 2012	2012
Winner	AFF Suzuki Cup 2016	2016
Winner	AFF Suzuki Cup 2020	2020
Winner	AFF Mitsubishi Electric Cup 2022	2022
- * Club domestic league appearances and goals as of 05:48, 22 June 2026 (UTC) ‡ National team caps and goals as of 17 November 2026

Theerathon Bunmathan (Thai: ธีราทร บุญมาทัน, RTGS: Thirathon Bunmathan, pronounced [tʰīː.rāː.tʰɔ̄ːn būn.māː.tʰān]; born 6 February 1990) is a Thai professional footballer who plays as a left back for Buriram United. He has also been used as a midfielder during the later of his career.

Theerathon is the first Thai player to win the J1 League with Yokohama F. Marinos in 2019.

== Club career ==
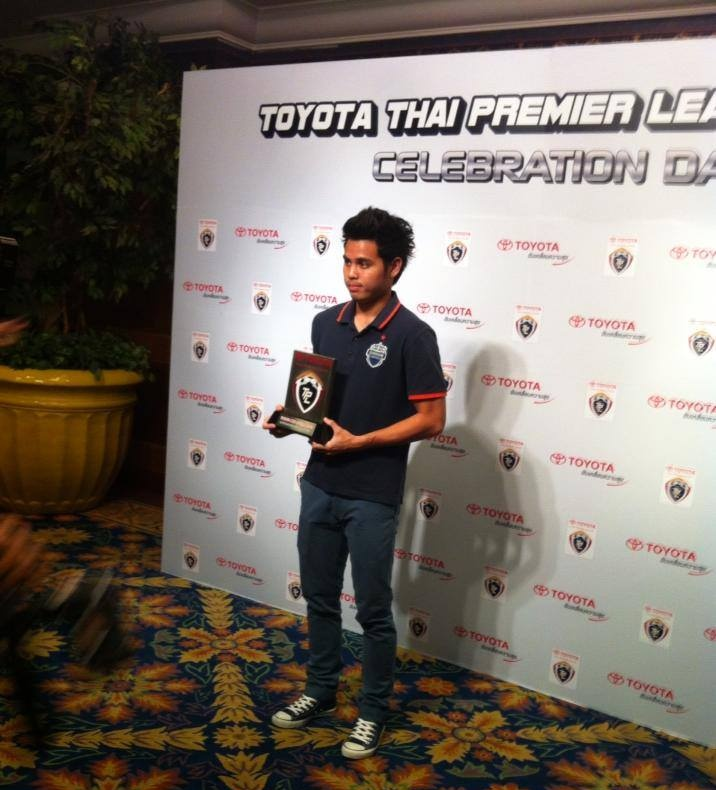
Theeraton at Thai Premier League Celebration day in 2013

=== Buriram United ===
Theerathon started almost every match for Buriram United during that period.Theerathon contributed to several successful seasons for Buriram United. He contributed goals and assists from set pieces. His free kick against FC Seoul in the 2013 AFC Champions League qualified Buriram to the knockout phase as groups runners-up drawing with Urawa Reds Diamonds at 10 points.. In the 2013 Thai Premier League Theerathon scored 3 goals against BEC Tero Sasana, Chonburi, and Ratchaburi Mitr Phol.

=== Muangthong United ===
In May 2016, it was announced that after spending seven years with Buriram United, he would be joining arch rivals Muangthong United the following month on a five-year contract for an all-time record for the highest football transfer fee for Thai League 1 at 35 million Baht. That record was soon broken on 2 November 2016 by Tanaboon Kesarat. The transfer fee is undisclosed but it is estimated to be around 50 million Baht.

=== Vissel Kobe ===
In February 2018, Theerathon was on loan to play in the J.League 1 club, Vissel Kobe for the remainder of the 2018 season, where he played alongside players including Lucas Podolski, David Villa, and Andres Iniesta.

=== Yokohama F. Marinos ===
In January 2019, Yokohama F. Marinos reached an agreement on loan to Theerathon from Muangthong United to play for the 2019 season. Hereafter, in March 2019, he started his first league match for the club in the match in which Yokohama opened the home match against former rival, Kawasaki Frontale with scores ended up in a 2–2 draw.

Later, in July 2019, Theerathon was named the J.League's Best Team of the Week after which he helped the team to beat Vissel Kobe, his former team with a score of 2–0. On 31 August 2019, Theerathon scored the first goal in the league and in the name of the club helped Yokohama defeat Gamba Osaka with a score of 3–1 and on 7 December 2019, the season-ending match of J.League Theerathon scored 1 goal and assists, helping Yokohama opens the house 3–0 defeat to FC Tokyo becoming the first Thai player to win the J.League title.

In December 2019, Theerathon signed a permanent contract with Yokohama F. Marinos, making him a permanent Yokohama F. Marinos player from December 2019. At the end of season 2020, Theerathon has been selected from the International Federation of Football History & Statistics (IFFHS) to be the first XI in AFC men team of the year 2020 alongside Takumi Minamino, Son Heung-min and Sardar Azmoun and is the only player in Southeast Asia in this best XI.

=== Buriram United ===
In December 2021, after 4 years in Japan, Theerathon returned home to re-joined his former club Buriram United. He was also named in the 26-man squad for the 2023 AFC Asian Cup in Qatar.

== International career ==
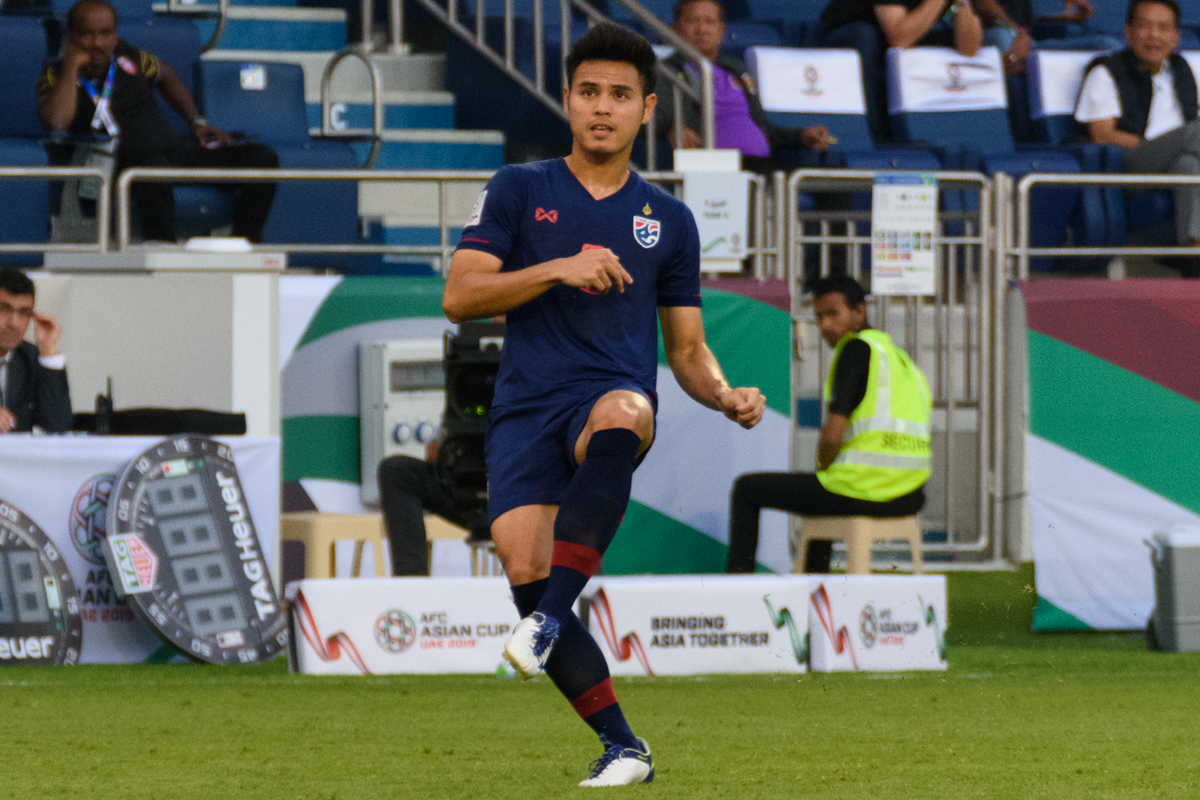
Theerathon with Thailand national team at the 2019 AFC Asian Cup in 2019

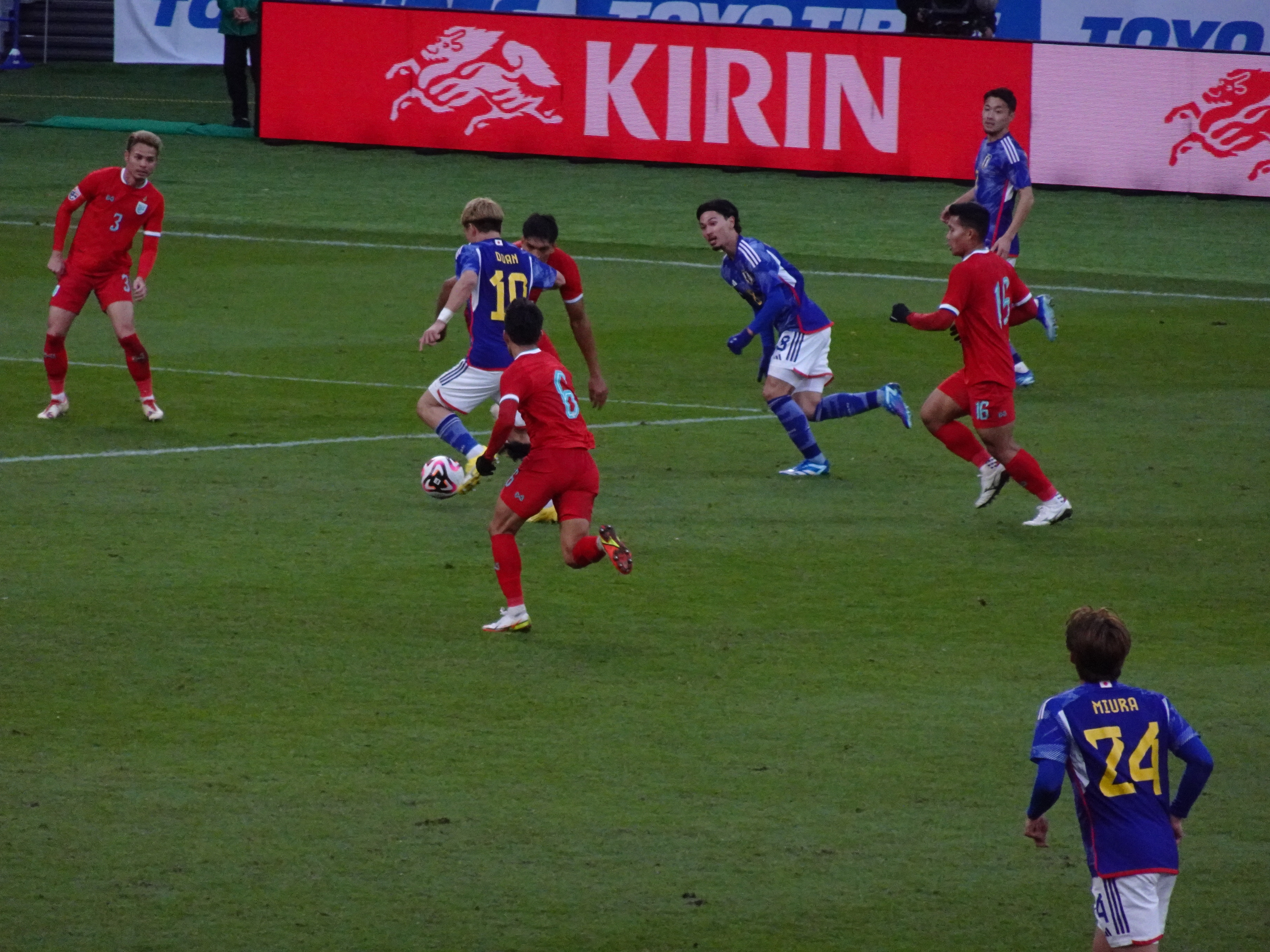
Theerathon (left) with Thailand national team versus Japan national team in 2024

Theerathon played against Saudi Arabia in the 2014 FIFA World Cup qualification and received a red card in the 90th minute. After that match he went to Indonesia to play for Thailand U-23 in the 2011 Southeast Asian Games. He was Thailand U-23's starter and received an early yellow card, followed by a second one a few minutes after which resulted in a red card, thus becoming the first player in Thai football to get two red cards in three days.

Theerathon's scored a penalty in a friendly match against Laos. His second international goal is a rebound from Jakkraphan Pornsai's free kick. He was a regular starter during the 2012 AFF Suzuki Cup forming an effective partnership on the left flank with Anucha Kitpongsri.

He represented Thailand U-23 at the 2013 Southeast Asian Games, and is selected as captain for the tournament.

In May 2015, he captained Thailand to play in the 2018 FIFA World Cup qualification against Vietnam.

In December 2018, Bunmathan was called up for the 2019 AFC Asian Cup in the United Arab Emirates. In January 2024, he was named in the 26-man squad for the 2023 AFC Asian Cup in Qatar. He earned his 100th cap with the national team against Oman in the second group stage match of the Asian tournament.

== Style of play ==
A versatile defender, Theerathon regularly plays as a left-back, and sometimes he has been deployed as a centre-back, central midfielder, and left midfielder. Primarily a left-back, Theerathon Bunmathan has also been deployed in central defence and midfield roles, contributing to both defensive and attacking phases of play through his passing and involvement in set pieces. Theerathon regularly takes set pieces, including free kicks and corners. Theerathon has been noted for his talents being visible since a young age, and he has been singled out for his mentality, consistency, and leadership.

== Personal life ==
On 24 May 2016, Theerathon married Chatrakamol Muangman in a traditional ceremony. The wedding was attended by many teammates and staff from the teams for which Theerathon had played.

== Career statistics ==
=== Club ===
As of 31 May 2026

Appearances and goals by club, season and competition
Club	Season	League			National cup (Note: Includes Thai FA Cup, Emperor's Cup)		League cup (Note: Includes Thai League Cup, J.League Cup)		Continental		Other		Total	
Club	Season	Division	Apps	Goals	Apps	Goals	Apps	Goals	Apps	Goals	Apps	Goals	Apps	Goals
Rajpracha	2009	Thailand League Division 2	10	0	—		—		—		—		10	0
Buriram United	2010	Thai League 1	26	0	2	0	—		—		28	0		
Buriram United	2011	Thai League 1	33	1	5	0	7	0	—		—		45	1
Buriram United	2012	Thai League 1	30	5	5	0	8	0	5 (Note: Appearances in AFC Champions League)	0	1 (Note: Appearance in Thailand Champions Cup)	0	49	5
Buriram United	2013	Thai League 1	30	3	5	1	5	1	10	1	1	0	51	6
Buriram United	2014	Thai League 1	33	2	2	1	7	0	6	1	1	0	49	4
Buriram United	2015	Thai League 1	32	3	6	1	6	0	6	2	1	0	51	6
Buriram United	2016	Thai League 1	9	1	—		—		6	0	1	0	16	1
Buriram United	Total		193	15	25	3	33	1	33	4	5	0	289	23
Muangthong United	2016	Thai League 1	12	2	1	0	3	0	—		—		16	2
Muangthong United	2017	Thai League 1	30	7	5	0	4	1	8	1	1	0	48	9
Muangthong United	2018	Thai League 1	—		—		—		2	1	—		2	1
Muangthong United	Total		42	9	6	0	7	1	8	1	1	0	64	11
Vissel Kobe	2018	J1 League	28	0	3	0	4	0	—		—		35	0
Yokohama F. Marinos	2019	J1 League	25	3	1	0	4	0	—		—		30	3
Yokohama F. Marinos	2020	J1 League	26	0	—		1	0	6	1	1 (Note: Appearance in Japanese Super Cup)	0	34	1
Yokohama F. Marinos	2021	J1 League	27	0	1	0	2	0	—		—		30	0
Yokohama F. Marinos	Total		78	3	2	0	7	0	6	1	1	0	94	4
Buriram United	2021–22	Thai League 1	15	1	4	1	4	0	1	0	1	0	25	2
Buriram United	2022–23	Thai League 1	28	2	5	0	5	0	—		1	0	39	2
Buriram United	2023–24	Thai League 1	27	2	3	1	4	0	6	0	—		40	3
Buriram United	2024–25	Thai League 1	20	1	4	0	3	0	6 (Note: Appearances in AFC Champions League Elite)	0	7 (Note: Appearances in ASEAN Club Championship)	0	40	1
Buriram United	2025–26	Thai League 1	23	1	5	0	4	0	6	0	9	1	47	2
Buriram United	2026–27	Thai League 1	0	0	0	0	0	0	0	0	0	0	0	0
Buriram United	Total		113	7	21	2	20	0	19	0	18	1	191	10
Buriram United	Buriram total		306	22	46	5	53	1	52	4	23	1	480	33
Career total			464	34	57	5	71	2	66	2	25	1	683	44

=== International ===
As of match played 31 March 2026

Appearances and goals by national team and year
National team	Year	Apps	Goals
Thailand	2010	2	0
Thailand	2011	1	0
Thailand	2012	10	2
Thailand	2013	3	0
Thailand	2014	0	0
Thailand	2015	8	3
Thailand	2016	16	1
Thailand	2017	5	0
Thailand	2018	3	0
Thailand	2019	12	1
Thailand	2021	4	0
Thailand	2022	12	0
Thailand	2023	11	1
Thailand	2024	8	0
Thailand	2025	2	1
Thailand	2026	1	0
Total		98	9

Scores and results list Thailand's goal tally first, score column indicates score after each Theerathon goal

List of international goals scored by Theerathon Bunmathan
No.	Date	Venue	Cap	Opponent	Score	Result	Competition
1	12 September 2012	Rajamangala Stadium, Bangkok, Thailand	4	Laos	2–1	2–1	Friendly
2	13 December 2012	Supachalasai Stadium, Bangkok, Thailand	11	Malaysia	2–0	2–0	2012 AFF Championship
3	8 September 2015	Rajamangala Stadium, Bangkok, Thailand	21	Iraq	1–2	2–2	2018 FIFA World Cup qualification
4	9 October 2015	Rajamangala Stadium, Bangkok, Thailand	22	Hong Kong	1–0	1–0	Friendly
5	13 October 2015	Mỹ Đình National Stadium, Hanoi, Vietnam	23	Vietnam	3–0	3–0	2018 FIFA World Cup qualification
6	8 December 2016	Rajamangala Stadium, Bangkok, Thailand	38	Myanmar	2–0	4–0	2016 AFF Championship
7	10 September 2019	Gelora Bung Karno Stadium, Jakarta, Indonesia	58	Indonesia	2–0	3–0	2022 FIFA World Cup qualification
8	16 January 2023	Thammasat Stadium, Pathum Thani, Thailand	81	Vietnam	1–0	1–0	2022 AFF Championship
9	13 November 2025	Thammasat Stadium, Pathum Thani, Thailand	96	Singapore	2–1	3–2	Friendly

== Honours ==
=== Club ===
Buriram United

- Thai League 1 (9): 2011, 2013, 2014, 2015, 2021–22, 2022–23, 2023–24, 2024–25, 2025–26
- Thai FA Cup (8): 2011, 2012, 2013, 2015, 2021–22, 2022–23, 2024–25, 2025–26
- Thai League Cup (7): 2011, 2012, 2013, 2015, 2021–22, 2022–23, 2024–25
- Toyota Premier Cup (3): 2012, 2014, 2016
- Kor Royal Cup (4): 2013, 2014, 2015, 2016
- Mekong Club Championship: 2015
- ASEAN Club Championship (2): 2024–25, 2025–26

Muangthong United

- Thai League 1: 2016
- Thai League Cup (2): 2016, 2017
- Thailand Champions Cup: 2017
- Mekong Club Championship: 2017

Yokohama F. Marinos

- J1 League: 2019

=== International ===
Thailand U-23

- Sea Games Gold Medal: 2013

Thailand

- AFF Championship (3): 2016, 2020, 2022
- King's Cup (3): 2016, 2017, 2026

=== Individual ===
- AFF Championship Most Valuable Player: 2022
- AFF Championship Best XI: 2012, 2022
- AFF Championship All-time XI
- ASEAN Football Federation Best XI: 2013
- Thai League Best XI: 2021–22, 2023–24, 2025–26
- Thai Premier League/Thai League 1 Player of the Month: October 2013, February 2022
- Thai League Best XI Mid-Season: 2024–25
- ASEAN Club Championship: Allstar XI 2024–25, 2025–26
- AFC Champions League Dream Team: 2013
- Thai League 1 Player of the Year: 2013, 2021–22, 2025–26
- IFFHS AFC Man Team of the Year: 2020
- IFFHS AFC Men's Team of the Decade 2011–2020

== Royal decoration ==
- Silver Medalist (Seventh Class) of The Most Admirable Order of the Direkgunabhorn (2015)

== See also ==
- List of men's footballers with 100 or more international caps
