= 2015 Toyota Premier Cup =

BEC Tero Sasana	Sagan Tosu
(Thailand)	(Japan)
0	0
- (4–3p)
- Date: 22 February 2015
- Venue: National Stadium, Bangkok
- Referee: (Thailand) Suprem Nontawong

The 2015 Toyota Premier Cup was the 5th Toyota Premier Cup. It's a single-game cup competition organized by the Toyota and Football Association of Thailand. It features BEC Tero Sasana the winners of the 2014 Thai League Cup and Sagan Tosu an invited team from the 2014 J.League Division 1 (Japan). It features at Supachalasai Stadium. It is sponsored by Toyota.

== Details ==
22 February 2015
16:00 UTC+7

BEC Tero Sasana (Thailand)	0–0	(Japan) Sagan Tosu
	Report
Penalties
Rangsan Viwatchaichok (penalty scored); Adisak Kraisorn (penalty scored); Fodé Diakité (penalty missed); Chanathip Songkrasin (penalty missed); Bojan Beljić (penalty scored); Tanaboon Kesarat (penalty scored)	4–3	(penalty scored) Naoyuki Fujita; (penalty scored) Teruaki Kobayashi; (penalty scored) Kei Ikeda; (penalty missed) Ryuhei Niwa; (penalty missed) Kim Min-hyeok; (penalty missed) Choi Sung-keun

National Stadium, Bangkok
Referee: (Thailand) Suprem Nontawong

BEC Tero Sasana	Sagan Tosu

Head Coach: (Serbia) Božidar Bandović	Head Coach: (Japan) Hitoshi Morishita

Assistant referees:
(Thailand) Amnat Phongmanee
(Thailand) Kriangsak Kiatsongkram
Fourth official:
(Thailand) Thitichai Nuanchan

MATCH RULES

- 90 minutes.
- Penalty shoot-out if necessary.
- Maximum of six substitutions.
