= Božidar Bandović =

Montenegrin footballer and manager

Personal information
- Full name: Božidar Bandović
- Date of birth: 30 August 1969 (age 57)
- Place of birth: Nikšić, SR Montenegro, SFR Yugoslavia
- Height: 1.84 m (6 ft 1/2 in)
- Position: Defender

Team information
- Current team: Port (head coach)

Youth career
- Sutjeska Nikšić

Senior career*
Years	Team	Apps	(Gls)
1986–1988	St. Louis Steamers (indoor)	52	(22)
1988–1992	Sutjeska Nikšić	71	(5)
1992–1994	Red Star Belgrade	29	(3)
1994–1996	Ethnikos Piraeus	38	(4)
1996–1997	Paniliakos	32	(4)
1997–1998	Olympiacos	18	(0)
1998–1999	PAOK	36	(6)
2000–2001	Paniliakos	45	(6)
2001–2002	Ethnikos Asteras	19	(1)

Managerial career
- 2004–2005: Akratitos (assistant)
- 2005–2006: Kerkyra (assistant)
- 2008: Olympiacos (assistant)
- 2009: Olympiacos (caretaker)
- 2010: Olympiacos
- 2010: Olympiacos (assistant)
- 2011: Kerkyra
- 2012: AEL
- 2012–2013: Baku
- 2014: Buriram United
- 2014–2015: BEC-Tero Sasana
- 2016: Sisaket
- 2016–2020: Buriram United
- 2021–2022: Chennaiyin
- 2023: Hà Nội
- 2023: PT Prachuap
- 2023–2024: Vojvodina
- 2026: Radnički 1923
- 2026–: Port
- * Club domestic league appearances and goals

Božidar Bandović (Serbian Cyrillic: Божидар Бандовић; born 30 August 1969) is a Montenegrin professional football manager and former player. He is currently the head coach of the Thai League 1 club, Port.

== Playing career ==
Born in Nikšić, SR Montenegro, as a player, while playing for Red Star Belgrade, he won one national cup in 1993.

He is the younger brother of another ex-Red Star footballer, Nebojša Bandović.

== Managerial career ==
Start as assistant coach to the Greek coach Babis Tennes at Kerkyra (6/2005 – 6/2006) and Akratitos (6/2004 – 6/2005) Greek Second Division. Both years with different teams went from the Second to the First division.

In Olympiacos from June 2006 till October 2010, he worked as head of analysis, scouter Olympiacos (July 2006 – January 2010) scouting opponent with team having successes playing Champion League and dominated in Greek Championship. Two times as assistant coach, Olympiacos (January 2008 - June 2008) to the head coach José Segura from Spain (team won championship, Greek Cup) and June 2010 – October 2010 assistant manager to Ewald Lienen from Germany.

Bandović took the technical leadership of the Olympiacos two times (first September 2009 taken control of the team temporarily before Zico's arrival and second at January 2010 with Andreas Niniadis as his assistant after Zico's dismissal. as a caretaker coach after Temuri Ketsbaia's dismissal.

Initially appointed as a head coach in September 2009 during the Champion League and had a successful start including three very credible games with Alkmaar and Championship away games with AEK and PAOK. Second time in January 2010, having taken over halfway through the season with the club playing in Champion League against Bordeaux.

In November 2010 was hired by Kerkyra replacing Babis Tennes. In Kerkyra successful stay in The First Division that proved to be the first time in the history in Super League concerning they dropped down three times in the pas. In November 2011 he left the club.

On 17 January 2012 he was officially announced as the team manager of AEL, replacing Chris Coleman, but did not sign a contract.

As head coach called to Azerbaijan to manage FC Baku in June 2012. Took over the team ten days before the Championship started. Under Bandović's guidance, the team played in the first six play-offs and in semifinal of Azerbaijan Cup. First time in history team didn't lose ten games in a row.

Manage Buriram United in Thailand from January 4, 2014, Start with great win in Champion League against Sangdong, Pohang drew four points from two games. In championship stayed unbeaten for 12 games, with team going from 13th table position to 3rd. Surprising suddenly terminated contract from the club at 7/2014.

In 2016, as a head coach of Sisaket he made club record managing to stay undefeated at home ground for entire seven months.

From June 2017, in position of head coach for Buriram United he won Thai Premier League and made league record finishing season with 86 points, most points ever made in Thai Premier League. Also under his guidance club get rewards for "Best developing club", "Best player of the year", "Best foreign player of the year", "Men's player of the year" and "Best youth player of the year".

In season 2018. he led his team Buriram United to another Champions title of Thai Premier League and their dominance is best shown by their making of two new records by winning 87 points in one season, and record of 15 consecutive wins.

He was named Thai Premier League Coach of The Year 2018.

This season they also made great success when they qualified to "Round of 16" of AFC Champions League, after advancing from a difficult group stage clashes with Guangzhou Evergrande, Cerezo Osaka and Jeju United. Buriram United was eliminated by South Korean champions Jeonbuk Hyundai Motors FC after total score 4–3 in two match clash. After Buriram win at home 3–2, they lost in Jeonju match 2–0, but they finished their presentation in Asia's top club competition with proud. Buriram United was named officially 12th ranked club of this competition for season 2018.

Season 2019 they started with another trophy, they won Thailand Champions Cup with a dominant win 3–1 over last year FA Cup champion, Chiangrai United.

On 10 July 2021, Bandović was appointed as the head coach of Indian Super League club Chennaiyin on a one-year deal. Under his guidance, the club began their 2021–22 Indian Super League season campaign on 23 November with a 1–0 win over Hyderabad.

== Managerial statistics ==
As of match played 19 November 2026

Managerial record by team and tenure
Team	Nat.	From	To	Record					Ref.
Team	Nat.	From	To	G	W	D	L	Win %	Ref.
Olympiacos (caretaker)	(Greece)	15 September 2009	22 September 2009	2	2	0	0	100.00	
Olympiacos	(Greece)	19 January 2010	14 June 2010	20	8	4	8	40.00	
Kerkyra	(Greece)	30 November 2010	9 November 2011	29	8	5	16	27.59	
AEL	(Greece)	17 January 2012	30 January 2012	3	0	0	3	0.00	
Baku	(Azerbaijan)	19 July 2012	20 May 2013	37	11	16	10	29.73	
Buriram United	(Thailand)	14 April 2014	7 June 2014	11	7	3	1	63.64	
BEC-Tero Sasana	(Thailand)	20 November 2014	15 May 2015	10	3	3	4	30.00	
Sisaket	(Thailand)	5 January 2016	4 August 2016	25	7	8	10	28.00	
Buriram United	(Thailand)	14 June 2017	19 October 2020	134	87	24	23	64.93	
Chennaiyin	(India)	10 July 2021	11 February 2022	16	5	4	7	31.25	
Hanoi	(Vietnam)	3 January 2023	7 October 2023	24	12	5	7	50.00	
PT Prachuap	(Thailand)	11 October 2023	12 December 2023	7	2	0	5	28.57	
Vojvodina	(Serbia)	29 December 2023	26 August 2024	29	13	7	9	44.83	
Radnički 1923	(Serbia)	3 January 2026	14 April 2026	10	1	6	3	10.00	
Port	(Thailand)	25 September 2026	Present	10	5	1	4	50.00	
Career Total				367	171	86	110	46.59	

== Honours ==
=== Manager ===
BEC-Tero Sasana

- 2015 Toyota Premier Cup - Winner

Buriram United

- Thai Premier League: 2017, 2018 - Winner and record with 87 points, most points ever made in Thai Premier League history.
- Thai Premier League 2018 - Coach of The Year
- Thailand Champions Cup 2019 - Winners
- Hanoi
- Vietnamese Super Cup: 2022
- V.League 1 2023 - Coach of The Year
