= Prapol Pongpanich =

Thai football manager

Personal information
- Full name: Prapol Pongpanich
- Date of birth: 18 September 1952
- Place of birth: Bangkok, Thailand
- Date of death: 3 February 2012 (aged 59)
- Place of death: Pathum Thani, Thailand

Youth career
- Rajpracha

Senior career*
| Years | Team | Apps | (Gls) |
- Rajpracha

Managerial career
- 2001–2009: Provincial Electricity Authority
- 2010: Ratchaburi
- 2010–2011: Bangkok United
- 2011: Thailand U23
- * Club domestic league appearances and goals

Prapol Pongpanich (Thai: ประพล พงษ์พาณิชย์; 18 September 1952 – 3 February 2012) was a Thai football coach. He led the side to the Thailand Premier League 2008 league title. In 2010, he became head coach of Thai Premier League team Bangkok United.

He is regarded as a legend of Rajpracha and a highly renowned coach in Thailand. However, during his tenure as the head coach of the Thailand U23 national team at the SEA Games in Indonesia, the team was eliminated in the first round, drawing severe criticism. Consequently, he announced his resignation as head coach and temporarily stepped away from the football industry during that period.

== Death ==
On February 3, 2012, Prapol died due to a Acute heart failure.

== Honours ==
As head coach

- Thailand Premier League Champions : 2008 with Provincial Electricity Authority FC
- Coach of the Year 2008 with Provincial Electricity Authority FC
