= 2011 Toyota Premier Cup =

Thai Port	Shonan Bellmare
(Thailand)	(Japan)
2	1
- Date: 13 February 2011
- Venue: National Stadium, Bangkok

The 2011 Toyota Premier Cup featured Thai Port, the winners of the 2010 Thai League Cup against Shonan Bellmare from the 2010 J. League Division 1.

== Final ==
13 February 2011
16:00 UTC+07:00

Thai Port (Thailand)	2–1	(Japan) Shonan Bellmare
Mário 15'; Jacob 83'	Report	Takayama 88'

National Stadium, Bangkok
Referee: (Thailand)

2011 Toyota Premier Cup

Thai Port F.C.
First Title
