= 2016 Toyota Premier Cup =

Buriram United	Albirex Niigata
(Thailand)	(Japan)
2	1
- Date: 13 February 2016
- Venue: i-mobile Stadium, Buriram
- Man of the Match: Go Seul-ki
- Referee: Muhammad Taqi Aljaafari Bin Jahari (Singapore)

The 2016 Toyota Premier Cup was the 6th Toyota Premier Cup. It's a single-game cup competition organized by the Toyota and Football Association of Thailand. It features Buriram United the winners of the 2015 Thai League Cup and Albirex Niigata an invited team from the 2015 J1 League (Japan). It features at i-mobile Stadium. It is sponsored by Toyota Motor.

== Match ==
=== Details ===
13 February 2016
18:30 UTC+7

Buriram United (Thailand)	2–1	(Japan) Albirex Niigata
Seul-ki 59', 78'	Report	Léo Silva 55'

i-mobile Stadium, Buriram
Referee: Muhammad Taqi Aljaafari Bin Jahari (Singapore)

Buriram United	Albirex Niigata

GK	1	(Thailand) Siwarak Tedsungnoen
DF	2	(Thailand) Theeraton Bunmathan
DF	5	(Venezuela) Andrés Túñez		(yellow card) 85'
DF	14	(Thailand) Chitipat Tanklang
DF	16	(Thailand) Koravit Namwiset
MF	7	(South Korea) Go Seul-ki	59', 78'		(substituted off) 80'
MF	8	(Thailand) Suchao Nuchnum (c)			(substituted off) 70'
MF	10	(Thailand) Jakkaphan Kaewprom
MF	11	(Brazil) André Moritz			(substituted off) 60'
MF	17	(Thailand) Anawin Jujeen			(substituted off) 65'
FW	20	(Brazil) Kaio Felipe Gonçalves
Substitutes:
GK	29	(Thailand) Yotsapon Teangdar
DF	3	(Thailand) Sathaporn Daengsee			(substituted on) 70'
MF	4	(Thailand) Adul Lahsoh		(yellow card) 88'	(substituted on) 60'
DF	13	(Thailand) Narubadin Weerawatnodom
DF	24	(Thailand) Nukoolkit Krutyai
DF	25	(Thailand) Suree Sukha			(substituted on) 65'
MF	28	(Thailand) Chaowat Veerachat
DF	34	(Thailand) Anon Amornlerdsak
MF	39	(Thailand) Anan Buasang			(substituted on) 80'
Head Coach:
(Brazil) Alexandre Gama

GK	21	(Japan) Tatsuya Morita
DF	2	(Japan) Kazunari Ono
DF	6	(Japan) Yuki Kobayashi (c)
DF	7	(Brazil) Bruno Cortez
DF	27	(Japan) Ken Matsubara			(substituted off) 46'
DF	28	(Japan) Fumiya Hayakawa
MF	17	(Japan) Yuya Ito
MF	25	(Japan) Kei Kozumi		(yellow card) 77'
MF	8	(Brazil) Léo Silva	55'	(yellow card) 85'
FW	9	(Japan) Ryohei Yamazaki			(substituted off) 76'
FW	11	(Japan) Hiroshi Ibusuki
Substitutes:
GK	22	(Japan) Goro Kawanami
DF	5	(Japan) Takanori Maeno
FW	10	(Brazil) Rafael Silva
MF	13	(Japan) Masaru Kato			(substituted on) 46'
FW	14	(Japan) Tatsuya Tanaka			(substituted on) 76'
DF	24	(Japan) Ryoma Nishimura
MF	26	(Japan) Go Hayama
MF	29	(Japan) Kiwara Miyazaki
MF	41	(Japan) Kazuki Kozuka
Head Coach:
(Japan) Tatsuma Yoshida

Assistant referees:
(Thailand) Anuwat Feemuechang
(Thailand) Binlha Preeda
Fourth official:
(Thailand) Mongkolchai Pechsri
Match Commissioner:
(Thailand) Danai Mongkolsiri

MATCH RULES

- 90 minutes.
- Penalty shoot-out if necessary.
- Maximum of six substitutions.

== Winner ==
2016 Toyota Premier Cup
winners

Third title
