= 2014 Toyota Premier Cup =

Buriram United	Nagoya Grampus
(Thailand)	(Japan)
1	1
- (4–3p)
- Date: 15 February 2014
- Venue: Thammasat Stadium, Pathum Thani

The 2014 Toyota Premier Cup was the 4th Toyota Premier Cup. It's a single-game cup competition organized by the Toyota and Football Association of Thailand. It features Buriram United the winners of the 2013 Thai League Cup and Nagoya Grampus an invited team from the 2013 J.League Division 1 (Japan). It features at Thammasat Stadium. It is sponsored by Toyota.

== Details ==
15 February 2014
17:45 UTC+7

Buriram United (Thailand)	1–1	(Japan) Nagoya Grampus
Jay Simpson 15'	Report	Shun Obu 43'
Penalties
Charyl Chappuis (penalty missed); Jirawat Makarom (penalty scored); Leandro Torres (penalty scored); David Rochela (penalty scored); Leonel Altobelli (penalty scored)	4–3	(penalty missed) Keiji Tamada; (penalty scored) Yoshizumi Ogawa; (penalty scored) Marcus Tulio Tanaka; (penalty missed) Naoshi Nakamura; (penalty scored) Shun Obu

Thammasat Stadium, Pathum Thani

Buriram United	Nagoya Grampus

GK	1	(Thailand) Siwarak Tedsungnoen
DF	25	(Thailand) Suree Sukha
DF	5	(Spain) David Rochela
DF	3	(Thailand) Pratum Chuthong
DF	17	(Thailand) Anawin Jujeen
MF	10	(Thailand) Jakkraphan Kaewprom
MF	2	(Thailand) Theeraton Bunmathan
MF	19	(Argentina) Leonel Altobelli
MF	8	(Thailand) Suchao Nutnum
FW	23	(England) Jay Simpson
FW	7	(Spain) Carmelo González
Head Coach:
(Spain) Alejandro Menéndez

Head Coach:
(Japan) Akira Nishino

MATCH RULES

- 90 minutes.
- Penalty shoot-out if necessary.
- Maximum of six substitutions.
