= 2012 Toyota Premier Cup =

Buriram United	Vegalta Sendai
(Thailand)	(Japan)
1	1
- Date: 18 February 2012
- Venue: National Stadium, Bangkok

The 2012 Toyota Premier Cup featured Buriram United, the winners of the 2011 Thai League Cup against Vegalta Sendai, the fourth placed team from the 2011 J. League Division 1.

== Final ==
18 February 2012
16:00 UTC+07:00

Buriram United (Thailand)	1-1	(Japan) Vegalta Sendai
Acheampong 37'	Report	Ota 73'
Penalties
Penalty scored	4–2	Penalty scored Penalty missed

National Stadium, Bangkok
Referee: (Thailand)

2012 Toyota Premier Cup

Buriram United
First Title
