= Buriram United F.C. =

Association football club in Thailand

Buriram United บุรีรัมย์ ยูไนเต็ด
- Full name: Buriram United Football Club สโมสรฟุตบอลบุรีรัมย์ ยูไนเต็ด
- Nicknames: Thunder Castle (ปราสาทสายฟ้า)
- Short name: BRU
- Founded: 1970; 56 years ago, as Provincial Electricity Authority
- Ground: Chang Arena; Buriram, Thailand
- Capacity: 32,600
- Chairman: Newin Chidchob
- Head coach: Raúl Caneda
- League: Thai League
- 2025–26: Thai League, Champions
- Website: www.buriramunited.com
Home colours	Away colours	Third colours

Buriram United Football Club (Thai: สโมสรฟุตบอลบุรีรัมย์ ยูไนเต็ด) is a Thai professional football club based in Buriram. The club has played at the top level of Thai football for the majority of their existence and competes in the Thai League 1. The club was founded in 1970 as PEA Football Club (Provincial Electricity Authority Football Club), before being reformed as Buriram PEA and Buriram United in 2010 and 2012 respectively. Their home stadium is Chang Arena which has a capacity of 32,600. Buriram United is considered one of the best football clubs in the Southeast Asia region history.

Buriram United won their first Thai League 1 title in 2008 and the Kor Royal Cup in 1998, as PEA. The club was previously based in Ayutthaya before moving east to Buriram for the 2010 season. In the 2011 season, Buriram became the first team in Thailand football history to win all the domestic trophies, as the treble champions (2011 Thai Premier League, 2011 Thai FA Cup, and 2011 Thai League Cup). Buriram then went on to win five domestic treble in the 2011, 2013, 2015, 2021–22 and 2022–23 season where the club went undefeated in the league during the 2013 and 2015 season.

Buriram United has won a record of 12 Thai League 1 titles, 8 Thai FA Cups and 8 Thai League Cups, 2 Thailand Champions Cup and 3 Kor Royal Cup. Regionally, the club also won 1 ASEAN Club Championship in their inaugural revamp competition.

Buriram United is by far the most popular and successful Thailand football club, with millions of fans from across the country. Polling shows that it is also the third most popular football club in terms of supporters in Thailand overall behind Premier League clubs Liverpool and Manchester United. As of 2024, Buriram United has an estimated market value of €12.83 million.

== History ==
=== Origins: "Provincial Electricity Authority" (1970–2009) ===
The club was founded in 1970, but their first big success came in 1998 by winning the third division of the Kor Royal Cup. The club was then promoted to the Thai Division 1 League. In 2002–03 the club finished third in the second division. They then competed the Thai League 1 Relegation play-off, but lost the final match 0–1 to Thailand Tobacco Monopoly. A year later, they succeeded at the end of season 2003–04 with promotion to the Thai Premier League. PEA surprised everyone by becoming the league runner-up at the end of their first Premier League season. Being the runner-up entitled the club to participate in the AFC Champions League. It was the first participation in an international competition for the club. However, the club was excluded from the competition. In the following two seasons, 2006 and 2007, the PEA finished 10th and 8th.

In 2008 Provincial Electricity Authority relocated to Ayutthaya and played at Ayutthaya Province Stadium, where they gained a bigger fan base. The club played under the nickname of Faifa Ayutthaya (Electric Ayutthaya) from media and its fans. Under the head coach Prapol Pongpanich, PEA eventually won their first league title in Thai League 1. The club qualified for the 2009 AFC Champions League preliminary round.

In 2009, PEA was eliminated from the 2009 AFC Champions League after losing 1–4 to Singapore Armed Forces in extra-time at Rajamangala Stadium. PEA began their title defence campaign of the Thai Premier League with some poor performances. Prapon Pongpanich was sacked in the middle of the season and replaced by former Thailand national team head coach Thongsuk Sampahungsith. The club finished in ninth place out of sixteen in the final standings.

=== Breath of Buriram (2010–2013) ===
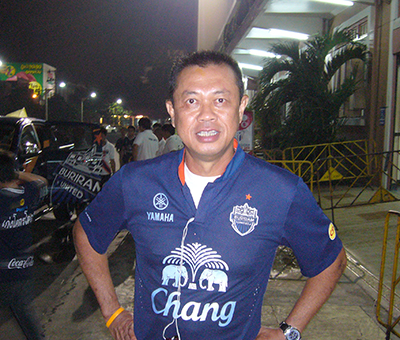
Newin Chidchob is the first chairman of the club, serving from 2009 to the present.

In December 2009, it was announced that a politician based in Buriram, Newin Chidchob was to take over the club. He had already tried unsuccessfully to take over TOT SC and Royal Thai Army Newin relocated the club to Buriram in Isan and rebranded it to Buriram PEA Football Club. Buriram PEA inherited most of the players from the former PEA club including the stars like Rangsan Viwatchaichok, Apichet Puttan and Theerathon Bunmathan. Pongphan Wongsuwan who was a long-time head coach of TOT SC was instated as a coach. Thailand national team member Suchao Nuchnum of TOT SC also followed his coach to the new team.

Buriram PEA finished their first season after the transition as the runner-up of the 2010 Thai Premier League. The club reached the final of the 2010 Thai League Cup but lost 0–1 to Thai Port at Supachalasai Stadium.

=== The Greatest in Thailand ===
In 2011, Buriram PEA under the head coach of Attaphol Buspakom, completed their 2011 season with the domestic treble by winning all three Thai major trophies. Buriram won 2011 Thai Premier League with 85 points, the highest record in the league history. They beat the arch-rival Muangthong United in the 2011 Thai FA Cup final and clinched their first Thai FA Cup title. Following the success in two other competitions, Buriram avenged their previous year League Cup final defeat against the same opponent, Thai Port, and won the 2010 Thai League Cup. Buriram PEA became the first Thai club to win the treble in a season.

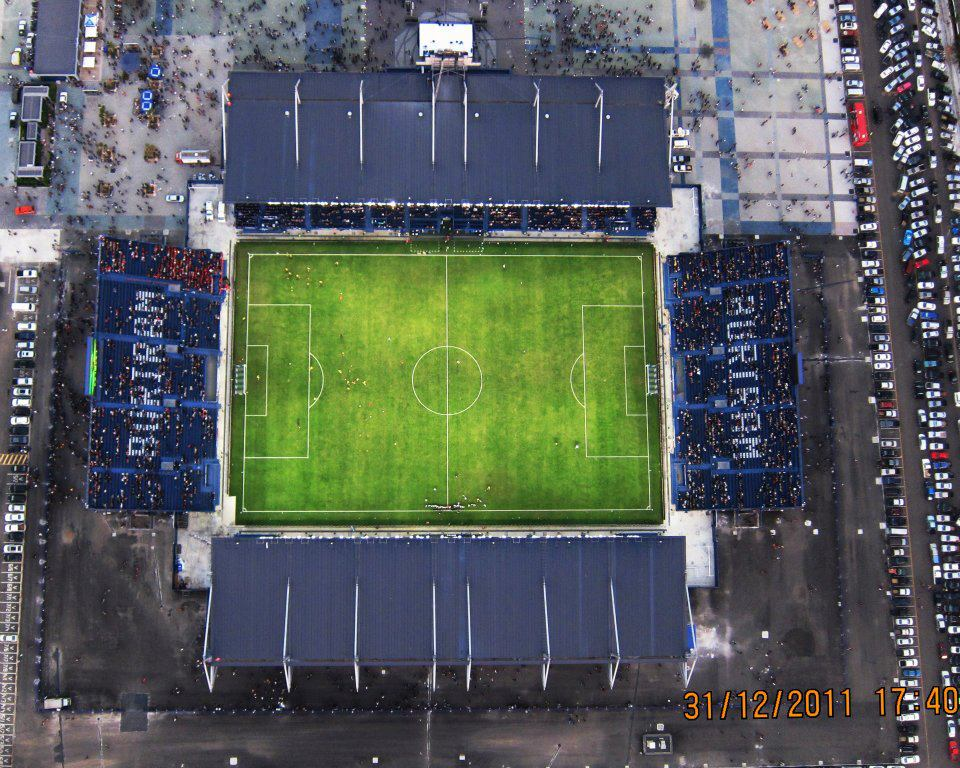
Buriram Stadium "The Thunder Castle" in 2011 before it was expanded in 2013

Buriram's stadium "The Thunder Castle", was built in 2011 – when it became the first Thailand football stadium without a running track on the side of the field and it was also recorded in the Guinness World Records as the FIFA standard football field with the shortest construction time of 256 days.

At the start of the 2012 season, the club was renamed Buriram United Football Club. In the first match of the group stages of the 2012 AFC Champions League, Buriram beat the 2011 J-League champion, Kashiwa Reysol, 3–2 and became "the first Thai and South East Asian club" to earn a victory against a J-League club in ACL since starting the Champions League system in 2003. In the second match, Buriram was the visiting team against the 2011 CSL Champion, Guangzhou Evergrande. Buriram also became "the first Thai and South East Asian club" to earn a victory against a Chinese club "in China" after beating Guangzhou Evergrande 1–2 in Tianhe Stadium from Suchao Nuchnum and Frank Acheampong's goals. That match was the end of a two-year unbeaten home record for Guangzhou.

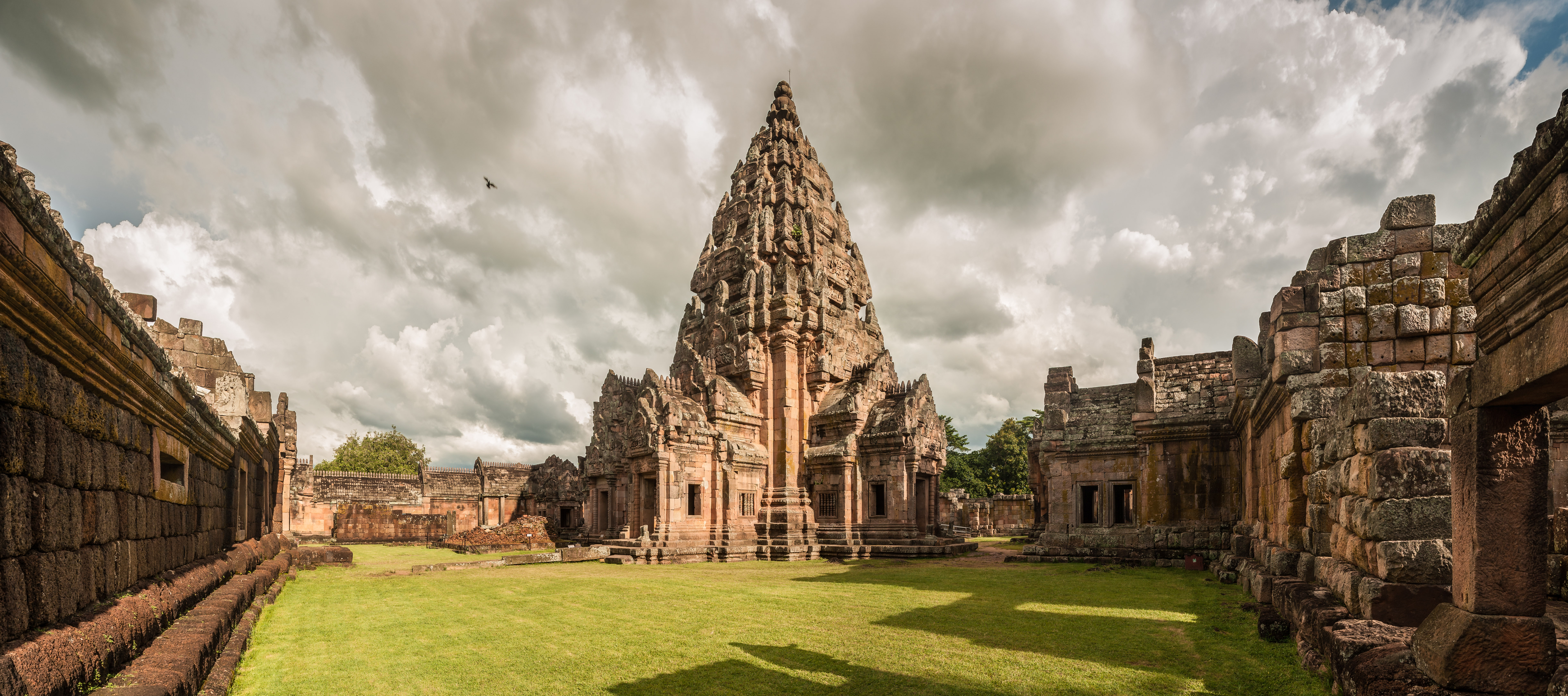
The ancient stone castle from Phanom Rung Historical Park serves as a symbol for the team. The club logo incorporates elements from the historical ancient stone castle Phanom Rung.

==== 2013 & 2015 - Quadruple season ====
In 2014, under Spanish head coach Alejandro Menéndez, Buriram United became the first Thai club to achieve the quadruple by winning 4 trophies in the calendar year. The campaign included the titles of Kor Royal Cup, Thai League T1, Thai FA Cup and Thai League Cup. The league season was also finished with the first invincible title for the club, the second Thai team to have achieved such a feat, after Muangthong United in 2012.

=== Alexandre Gama era (2014–2016) ===
In 2014, Brazilian coach Alexandre Gama was appointed to guide Buriram United and in his first season, he helped the club to retained the 2014 Thai Premier League. The following season, he guided Buriram United to, once again, winning all four of the competitions in the 2015 calendar year : 2015 Kor Royal Cup, 2015 Thai Premier League, 2015 Thai FA Cup, 2015 Thai League Cup and also the 2015 Mekong Club Championship.

Moreover, the 2015 Buriram United won the 2015 Thai Premier League with an unbeaten record. The Brazilian forward Diogo Luis Santo broke the top scoring record with 33 goals from 32 games and received Thai League T1 Top Scorer and Player of the Year Awards at the end of the year and Theerathon Bunmathan got top assists with 19 assists from 32 games in left back position. In 2016, Gama guided the club to win the 2016 Toyota Premier Cup and 2016 Kor Royal Cup before he stepped down as the club coach on 22 May 2016.

=== Strike back ===
In August 2016, club owner Newin Chidchob admitted he was disappointed that his team's bid to defend their league title that season was over. Buriram United then appointed Serbian Ranko Popović as the club manager to fill the vacant role after the dismissal of Iranian head coach Afshin Ghotbi and former coach Božidar Bandović returned as the technical director of the club.

In June 2017, Ranko Popović has resigned as head coach after receiving a three-month ban by the Thai FA for slapping the face of Bangkok United physio Andy Schillinger following a heated argument after Buriram United beat the capital side 2–1. Buriram United announced that they promoted Božidar Bandović to head coach from his position as technical director of football. In the same year, the club won the 2017 Thai League 1 and created history by claiming 86 points - the club's highest points in a single season.

In 2018, after finishing as league champions in the 2017 season, Buriram secured direct qualification into the 2018 AFC Champions League. In the group stages, a home, Buriram beat Japanese club Cerezo Osaka 2–0 and Korean club Jeju United 1–0 and drew 1–1 with Chinese club Guangzhou Evergrande. The club lost 4–3 on aggregate in the round of 16, against Korean side Jeonbuk Hyundai Motors. In the same year, Buriram comfortably retained the 2018 Thai League 1 title with a record 87 points. Bozidar Bandovic received Thai League 1 Coach of the Year Award at the end of the season.

=== Masatada Ishii era (2021–2023) ===
On 1 December 2021, Buriram appointed Japanese head coach Masatada Ishii. In his first season, Buriram won the 2021–22 Thai League 1, 2021–22 Thai FA Cup and the 2021–22 Thai League Cup. The following season, Buriram managed to retain all their three trophies, including the 2022–23 Thai League 1, 2022–23 Thai FA Cup and the 2022–23 Thai League Cup, becoming the first club to retain all of the possible trophies in the country.

=== Thunderstrike era (2024–present) ===

The usual 2024–25 AFC Champions League Elite line-up

In preparation for the new season, in which Buriram will also compete in the 2024–25 AFC Champions League Elite and the recently revived 2024–25 ASEAN Club Championship region tournament, the club signed Philippines goalkeeper Neil Etheridge, who has played in the English Premier League with Cardiff City. Buriram also signed a few notable key players like former Australian national Curtis Good. Buriram were then drawn in a group alongside Vietnamese club Công An Hà Nội, Singaporean club Lion City Sailors, Malaysian club Kuala Lumpur City, Philippines club Kaya—Iloilo and Indonesian club Borneo Samarinda. On 17 September 2024, Buriram managed to hold off Japanese club Vissel Kobe to a goalless draw at home, with both teams earning a point in the AFC Champions League Elite. Buriram registered the highest ever victory in the ASEAN Club Championship history, beating Philippines Kaya—Iloilo 7–0, with Lucas Crispim scoring a hat-trick in the match on 26 September. Buriram United then travelled to Australia to face Central Coast Mariners on 1 October in the AFC Champions League Elite fixture, where Buriram United came out victorious in a 2–1 win. On 15 January 2025, Buriram recorded their highest win in the top flight division where they thrashed Chiangrai United 8–0. Four days later, Buriram broke their own record by thrashing Khon Kaen United 9–0. Suphanat Mueanta recorded a hat-trick of goals and assist, and Martin Boakye scored a hat-trick in the game as well. Buriram then qualified to the semi-finals of the

ASEAN Club Championship as runners-up with three wins, one draw and one loss in the group stage. In the AFC Champions League Elite, they finished in sixth place, thus facing Southeast Asian rivals Johor Darul Ta'zim. Both teams contested in two draws in the same edition of the tournament until another away fixture at the Sultan Ibrahim Stadium on 11 March, where Suphanat Mueanta scored the only goal in the match, which sent the team to the quarter-finals of the tournament in Jeddah. Buriram United was then drawn against Saudi Pro League club Al Ahli in the quarter-final but lost to them 3–0 thus bowing out from the tournament. Buriram United then focus on the knockout stage of the ASEAN Club Championship facing against BG Pathum United defeating them 3–1 on aggregate thus advancing to the final. In the first leg of the final, Buriram draw 2–2 against Công An Hà Nội. In the second leg, as Buriram United was losing 2–0 which all hopes seem lost, Peter Žulj scored in the 83rd minute to give the club a glimpse chance to fight back until the 90+8th stoppage time where Lucas Crispim scored the equaliser to send the match to extra time. Guilherme Bissoli scored a penalty in the match but Buriram United was unavailable to defend a 118th-minute header from the opponent which put the aggregate at 5–5 thus sending the team to penalties shootout. Goalkeeper Chatchai Budprom went on to make an impact and save 3 penalties making Buriram United the champions of the 2024–25 ASEAN Club Championship. Lucas Crispim ended up winning the tournament 'Best Player' award and Chatchai Budprom for winning the 'Best Goalkeeper' award.

2025–26 AFC Champions League Elite quarter-final line-up against Shabab Al Ahli

During the draw of the 2025–26 ASEAN Club Championship on 4 July 2025, Buriram United was then draw in Group A alongside league rival, BG Pathum United, Vietnamese club Công An Hà Nội, Malaysian club, Selangor and Singaporean club Tampines Rovers. Buriram then went on to retain their title after defeating Selangor 3–1 on aggregate in the final. Buriram then defeated PT Prachuap in the 2025–26 Thai FA Cup final where Robert Žulj scored the only goal to secure the club 5th consecutive Thai FA Cup in a row. However, in the Thai League Cup, Buriram suffered a 1–0 defeat to BG Pathum United thus bowing out from the cup.

In the 2025–26 AFC Champions League Elite campaign, Buriram finished in 4th position in the league phase thus qualifying to the round of 16 where they would face Australian club Melbourne City. As both team was tied at 1–1 on both legs, the game went on to penalties shootout at the Buriram Stadium where Buriram managed to win 4–2 on penalties thus advancing to the quarter-final which is the club furthest that they had advance since the 2013 edition. Buriram then fly off to Jeddah to prepare for their quarter-final match against Emirati club Shabab Al Ahli. As both team was tied at 2–2, the game went on to extra time. However, Buriram conceded a goal in the 94th minute and lost the game 3–2 where they got knocked out from the tournament.

== Team image ==
=== Rivalries ===
Buriram United vs. Muangthong United in Thai League

Overall								Home						Away					
Pld	W	D	L	GF	GA	GD	Pts	W	D	L	GF	GA	GD	W	D	L	GF	GA	GD
18	7	9	2	23	14	+9	30	4	4	1	12	7	+5	3	5	1	11	7	+4

Buriram United's main rival is Muangthong United. The two clubs are the powerhouses of Thai League 1 (T1). The rivalry between two clubs has become highly competitive, since they are the only two clubs that have won the Thai League 1 championship since the 2009 season.

Season	Attendance	Total attn.
2011	15,008	255,129
2012	15,319	260,415
2013	18,941	303,054
2014	19,132	363,514
2015	19,553	332,412
2016	15,547	248,760
2017	13,890	236,137
2018	13,000	221,003
2019	13,558	203,374
As of 8 November 2019

Buriram United and Muangthong United also represent widely different groups of supporters. Buriram represents the mostly rural people of the Thai countryside, while Muangthong United symbolizes the urban people in the Bangkok Metropolitan Region. Their rivalry also reflects political differences in Football Association of Thailand (FAT) since Muangthong United has the close relationship with FAT under the management of Worawi Makudi, while former politician Newin Chidchob became the polar opposite and frequently questions the transparency of FAT.

The games between the two teams are regarded as an important match-up in Thai football. Buriram has dominated the rivalry head-to-head and maintained an unbeaten record against Muangthong for a long time after the club relocated to Buriram. The phrase "Rather lose to anyone but Muangthong." (Thai lit. แพ้ใครก็ได้ แต่ไม่แพ้เมืองทอง) became a famous quote for fans. Their unbeaten record against Muangthong was broken in 2016 Thai League when they lost 0–3 to their rival at home.

== Stadium ==
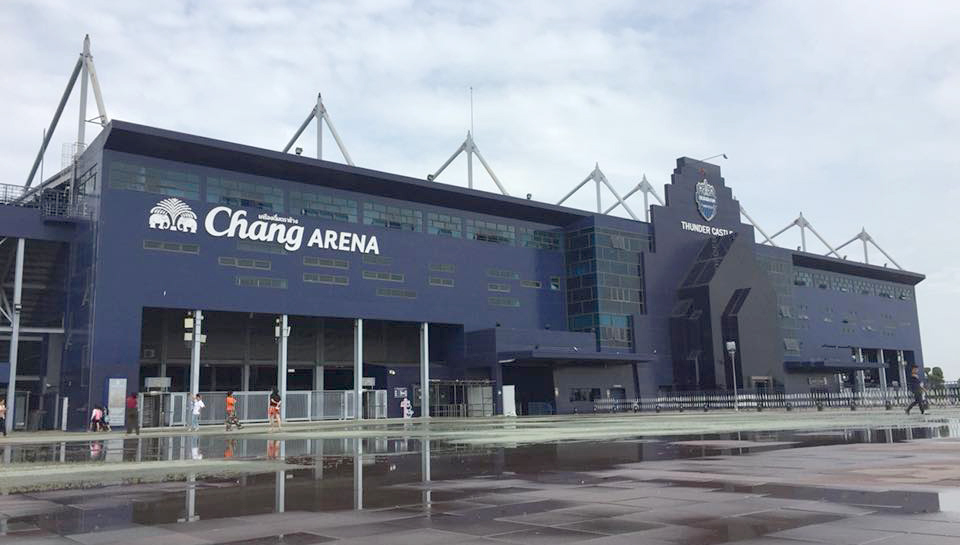
In front of the stadium

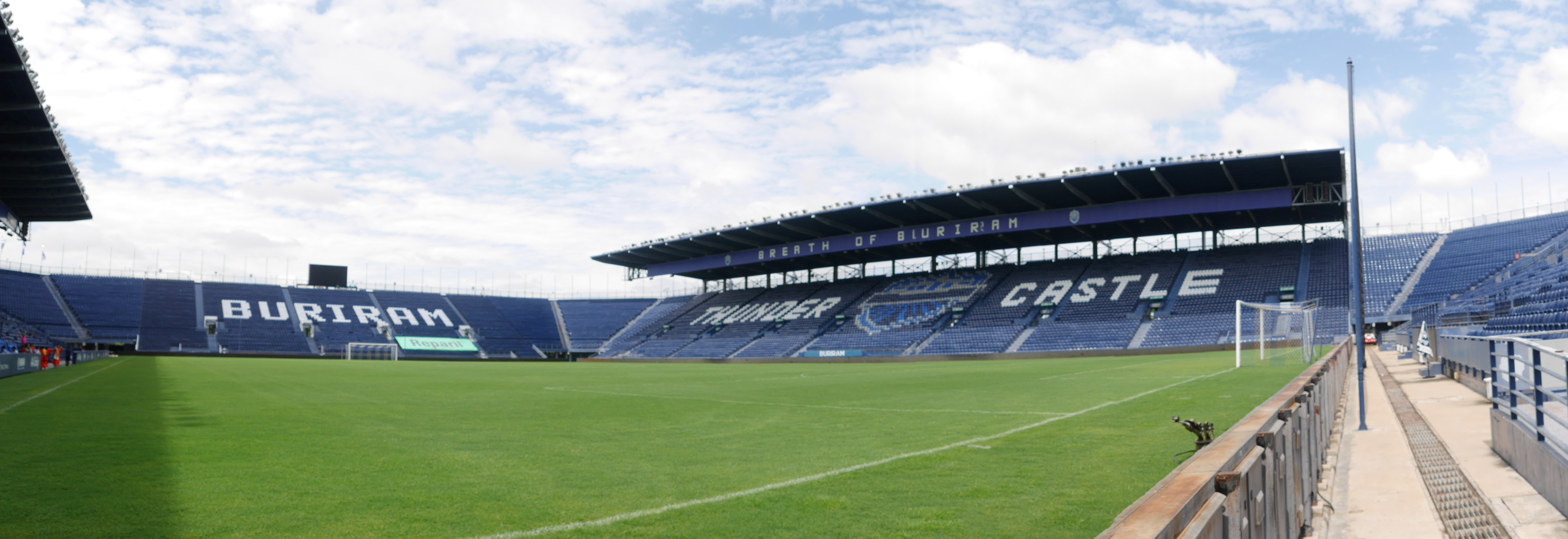
Chang Arena

Chang Arena is a 32,600 seater football stadium in Buriram, Buriram Province, Thailand. The Chang Arena is the second-largest football stadium in Thailand. Its nickname is "Thunder Castle". Buriram United has led the 16 team in the Thai League for a record in attendance since their move to the new stadium.

The Chang Arena is in the Mueang Buriram District, located about 3 km southwest of central Buriram along highway 2445. The 150-acre site has a capacity of 32,600 people with parking for 800 cars and buses, plus 3,000 motorcycles. The pitch is floodlit, allowing for night matches. The stadium houses locker rooms for home and visiting teams provides modern medical facilities and live television and radio broadcasting infrastructure.

=== Locations ===
Coordinates	Location	Stadium	Capacity	Year
13°24′41″N 100°59′37″E	Chonburi	IPE Chonburi Stadium	12,000	2007
14°21′00″N 100°35′50″E	Ayutthaya	Ayutthaya Province Stadium	6,000	2008–2009
14°56′45″N 103°06′13″E	Buriram	Khao Kradong Stadium	14,000	2010–2011
14°57′57″N 103°05′40″E	Buriram	Chang Arena	32,600	2011–present

- Highest attendance: 35,573 ~ (Thai League 1 match on 29 October 2018 vs Pattaya United)

== Academy development ==
Buriram United opened its first youth academies in 2011. The club is particularly famous for its renowned youth program that has produced many Thai talents over the years – Suphanat Mueanta, Supachok Sarachat, Ratthanakorn Maikami, and Anon Amornlerdsak have come through the ranks. Buriram United also regularly supplies the Thai national youth teams with local talent. Buriram youth academies play in the Thailand Youth League.

The "CP-Meiji Cup U-14 International Championship" is a famous youth program that is held at Chang Arena and Elephant Ground, between October–November every year, with six youth teams from Thailand's leading academies and six youth teams (Aspire Academy, Jubilo Iwata, Mokhtar Dahari Academy).

In 2018, Buriram United appointed Andrew Ord as head of youth development, the coach who gave Chanathip Songkrasin his youth team debut at BEC Tero Sasana. He replaced Brazilian Jose Alves Borges.

== Kit suppliers and shirt sponsors ==
List of Buriram United jersey since their interceptions in 2010

Year	Kit manufacturer	Main sponsors
2011–present	In-house production	(Thailand) Chang
AFC Champions League Kit
2011–2016	In-house production	(Thailand) Chang
2018	(Thailand) Warrix	(Thailand) Chang
2019–2021	(Thailand) Ari	(Thailand) Chang
2023–2024	(Spain) Kelme	(Thailand) Chang
2024–present	(Thailand) Ego	(Thailand) Chang

== Affiliated clubs ==
Dortmund is one of the teams we have always admired. We like their style of play and also the way the team is organized so professionally. We believe that there is much we can learn from each other throughout this partnership.

— Newin Chidchob, October 2018
- (Germany) Borussia Dortmund (2018–present)

Buriram United signed a collaboration agreement with Borussia Dortmund of the Bundesliga in October 2018. There is the deal to work together at youth level. Starting from U9 and going up to U19 the clubs discuss ways to develop youth players and give them the opportunity to press for places in the senior teams. Both teams have a similar philosophy in development as far as the use of technology, sports science and management in their youth programs.

- (England) Leicester City (2020–present)

Buriram United signed a collaboration agreement with Leicester City of the Premier League in September 2020. The announcement event was graced by the manager of King Power Group Aiyawatt Srivaddhanaprabha together with Buriram United chairman, Newin Chidchob. The collaboration of both clubs is part of a project known as "Thailand Smiles With You". The key goal of this partnership for both clubs is to send young Thai players to Europe to develop in a league which is a higher quality to those in Thailand. As part of this partnership Buriram club will send key players of the team namely Supachok Sarachat, Suphanat Mueanta, Supachai Jaided for professional football training at the facilities of Leicester City.

== Players ==
=== First-team squad ===
As of 31 Octorber 2026

Note: Flags indicate national team as defined under FIFA eligibility rules; some limited exceptions apply. Players may hold more than one non-FIFA nationality.

No.	Pos.	Nation	Player
2	DF	THA	Sasalak Haiprakhon (vice-captain)
3	DF	THA	Pansa Hemviboon
4	MF	IRI	Reza Asadi
5	DF	BRA	Nathan Pelae
6	DF	AUS	Curtis Good
7	FW	BRA	Guilherme Bissoli
8	MF	BRA	Paulinho
9	FW	THA	Supachai Chaided
10	MF	ESP	Sebas Moyano
11	MF	THA	Anan Yodsangwal
13	GK	PHI	Neil Etheridge (vice-captain)
15	DF	THA	Narubadin Weerawatnodom
16	MF	AUS	Kenny Dougall (Captain)
17	DF	ESP	Lucas Ahijado
18	MF	MNE	Vukan Savićević
19	MF	GHA	Kingsley Schindler
20	MF	ESP	Toni Moya
21	MF	THA	Iklas Sanron

No.	Pos.	Nation	Player
22	DF	ESP	Marc Navarro
23	MF	SRB	Goran Čaušić
26	DF	SRB	Uros Radakovic
27	MF	THA	Phitiwat Sukjitthammakul
28	FW	ESP	Rubén Sánchez
29	GK	THA	Korraphat Nareechan
30	FW	GER	Stefan Schimmer
31	DF	BRA	Wanderson Caju
33	MF	THA	Thanakrit Chotmuangpak
34	GK	THA	Chatchai Budprom
37	MF	BRA	Darlan Mendes
39	DF	THA	Jakkapan Praisuwan
40	DF	BRA	Eduardo Mancha
45	GK	THA	Prapot Chongcharoen
54	FW	THA	Nathakorn Ratthanasuwan
55	DF	THA	Theerathon Bunmathan
75	DF	THA	Shinnaphat Leeaoh
99	FW	ROU	Alexandru Tudorie

=== Out on loan ===
Note: Flags indicate national team as defined under FIFA eligibility rules; some limited exceptions apply. Players may hold more than one non-FIFA nationality.

No.	Pos.	Nation	Player
24	DF	THA	Elias Dolah (at (Thailand) BG Pathum United)
28	DF	THA	Maxx Creevey (at (Thailand) Chanthaburi)
57	GK	THA	Phumworraphon Wannabutr (at (Thailand) Rasisalai United)
67	MF	THA	Paripan Wongsa (at (Thailand) Rasisalai United)

No.	Pos.	Nation	Player
88	MF	THA	Dutsadee Buranajutanon (at (Thailand) Samui United)
89	MF	THA	Pongsakron Hanrattana (at (Thailand) Sisaket United)
92	DF	THA	Thanison Paiboonkitjaroen (at (Thailand) Uthai Thani)
95	MF	THA	Seksan Ratree (at (Thailand) Port)

=== Buriram United Under 21 squad ===
Buriram United U21 Squad For PEA U21 Youngster League 2025

Note: Flags indicate national team as defined under FIFA eligibility rules; some limited exceptions apply. Players may hold more than one non-FIFA nationality.

No.	Pos.	Nation	Player
33	MF	THA	Thanakrit Chotmuangpak
35	GK	THA	Kittipong Boonmak
39	MF	THA	Chanothai Kongmeng
47	MF	THA	Sakdisek Kosol (vice-captain 2)
48	DF	THA	Wanthayawut Nutkrasae
50	DF	THA	Singha Marasa
54	DF	THA	Nathakorn Rattanasuwan
55	DF	THA	Thanyakon Saweangsuk
57	GK	THA	Phumworraphon Wannabutr

No.	Pos.	Nation	Player
63	DF	THA	Jhetsaphat Kuantanom
66	DF	THA	Pikanet Laohawiwat
70	MF	THA	Jirapong Pueangvirawong
71	MF	THA	Ratthaphum Pankhejorn
78	MF	THA	Supanat Mahawai
80	MF	THA	Navapan Thianchai
89	MF	THA	Pongsakron Hanrattana
90	FW	THA	Panuphong Wongpila (Captain)
91	DF	THA	Phumin William Boers (vice-captain 3)
93	DF	THA	Piyawat Petra
99	FW	THA	Chanon Duangsri

== Management and staff ==
Position	Name
President	(Thailand) Newin Chidchob
Team Manager	(Thailand) Boriphat Soonrod
Head coach	(Spain) Raúl Caneda
Assistant coach	(Spain) Elías Martí (Portugal) Vítor Magalhães (Brazil) Emerson Pereira (Brazil) Anderson dos Santos
Goalkeeper coach	(Serbia) Zoran Mijanovic
Physical & Fitness coach	(Brazil) Juliano Vallim (Brazil) Willander Fonseca
Team analyst	(Spain) Jacinto Cejudo
Physiotherapists	(Brazil) Jose Antônio Lera
Manager of Academy Team	(Thailand) Siwarak Tedsungnoen (Thailand) Chitipat Tanklang (Japan) Masayuki Miura

== Honours ==
Type	Honours	Titles	Seasons
League	Thai League 1	12	2008, 2011, 2013, 2014, 2015, 2017, 2018, 2021–22, 2022–23, 2023–24, 2024–25, 2025–26
Cup	Thai FA Cup	8	2011, 2012, 2013, 2015, 2021–22, 2022–23, 2024–25, 2025–26
Cup	Thai League Cup	8	2011, 2012, 2013, 2015, 2016, 2021–22, 2022–23, 2024–25
Cup	Thailand Champions Cup	1	2019
Cup	Kor Royal Cup	4	2013, 2014, 2015, 2016
Regional	ASEAN Club Championship	2	2024–25, 2025–26
Regional	Mekong Club Championship	2	2015, 2016

Bold is for those competition that are currently active.

=== Double and trebles ===
- Double
  - Thai FA Cup and Thai League Cup (1): 2012
- Treble
  - Thai League 1, Thai FA Cup and Thai League Cup (5): 2011, 2013, 2015, 2021–22, 2022–23
- Quadruple
  - Thai League 1, Thai FA Cup, Thai League Cup, and ASEAN Club Championship: 2024–25

==== Buriram United fourth consecutive domestic trebles champions squad ====
The usual starting line-up
2021–22 season	2022–23 season	2023–24 season	2024–25 season

== Award winners ==
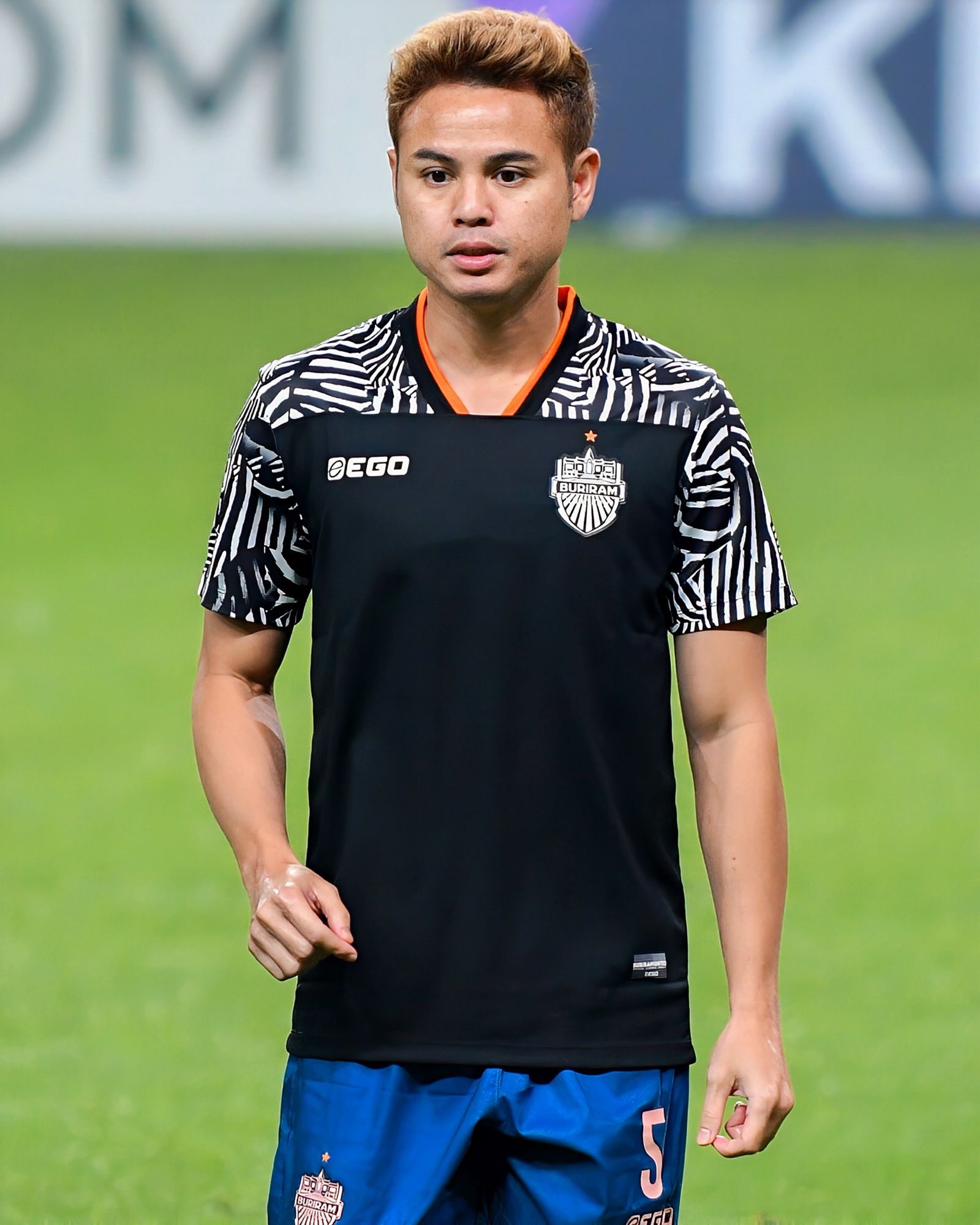
Theerathon Bunmathan is one of the most decorated player in the club history.

=== Domestic ===
- Most Valuable Player
  - (Thailand) Narongchai Vachiraban (2008)
  - (Thailand) Theerathon Bunmathan (2013, 2021–22)
  - (Thailand) Suchao Nuchnum (2014)
  - (Brazil) Diogo (2015)
  - (Thailand) Jakkaphan Kaewprom (2017)
  - (Thailand) Supachai Chaided (2022–23, 2023–24)
- League Golden Boot
  - (Thailand) Supakit Jinajai (2004–05)
  - (Cameroon) Franck Ohandza (2011)
  - (Spain) Carmelo González (2013)
  - (Brazil) Diogo (2015, 2018)
  - (Thailand) Supachai Chaided (2022–23, 2023–24)
  - (Brazil) Guilherme Bissoli (2024–25, 2025–26)
- Coach of the Season
  - (Thailand) Prapol Pongpanich (2008)
  - (Brazil) Alexandre Gama (2015)
  - (Montenegro) Božidar Bandović (2018)
  - (Thailand) Surachai Jaturapattarapong (2020–21)
  - (Japan) Masatada Ishii (2021–22, 2022–23)
  - (Brazil) Osmar Loss (2024–25)
- Team of the Season
  - (Australia) Kenny Dougall (2024–25, 2025–26)
  - (Brazil) Guilherme Bissoli (2024–25, 2025–26)
  - (Philippines) Neil Etheridge (2024–25)
  - (Malaysia) Dion Cools (2024–25)
  - (Brazil) Lucas Crispim (2024–25)
  - (Thailand) Sasalak Haiprakhon (2025–26)
  - (Australia) Kenny Dougall (2025–26)
  - (Serbia) Goran Čaušić (2025–26)

=== Continental ===
==== ASEAN Club Championship ====
- Player of the Tournament
  - (Brazil) Lucas Crispim (2024–25)
  - (Brazil) Guilherme Bissoli (2025–26)
- Best Goalkeeper of the Tournament
  - (Thailand) Chatchai Budprom (2024–25)
- Best Young Player of the Tournament
  - (Thailand) Nathakorn Ratthanasuwan (2025–26)
- Team of the Tournament
  - (Thailand) Theerathon Bunmathan (2024–25, 2025–26)
  - (Thailand) Chatchai Budprom (2024–25)
  - (Australia) Curtis Good (2024–25)
  - (Brazil) Lucas Crispim (2024–25)
  - (Thailand) Pansa Hemviboon (2025–26)
  - (Philippines) Neil Etheridge (2025–26)
  - (Austria) Peter Žulj (2025–26)

== Records and statistics ==
As of 9 October 2026.

Top 10 all-time appearances
Rank	Player	Years	Club appearances
1	(Thailand) Siwarak Tedsungnoen	2010–2025	455
2	(Thailand) Supachai Chaided	2017–present	361
3	(Thailand) Narubadin Weerawatnodom	2015–present	357
4	(Thailand) Theerathon Bunmathan	2009–2016, 2021–present	341
5	(Thailand) Pansa Hemviboon	2016–present	316
6	(Thailand) Sasalak Haiprakhon	2017–present	315
7	(Thailand) Ratthanakorn Maikami	2016–2026	304
8	(Thailand) Jakkaphan Kaewprom	2011–2022	258
9	(Thailand) Chitipat Tanklang	2012–2024	222
10	(Thailand) Suchao Nutnum	2010–2019	221

Top 10 all-time scorers
Rank	Player	Club appearances	Total goals
1	(Brazil) Diogo	139	119
2	(Thailand) Supachai Chaided	361	106
3	(Brazil) Guilherme Bissoli	136	105
4	(Thailand) Supachok Sarachat	204	49
5	(Thailand) Suphanat Mueanta	188	48
6	(Serbia) Goran Čaušić	131	46
7	(Philippines) Javier Patiño	84	43
8	(Brazil) Jajá Coelho	40	38
8	(Venezuela) Andres Tuñez	207	38
10	(Spain) Carmelo González	66	37

- Biggest wins: 12–0 vs Warin Chamrap (29 October 2025)
- Heaviest defeats: 0–6 vs (South Korea) FC Seoul (23 February 2016)
- Youngest ever debutant: Suphanat Mueanta ~ 15 years 8 months 23 days old (On 25 April 2018 vs Nakhon Ratchasima)
- Oldest ever player: Siwarak Tedsungnoen ~ 41 years 6 days old (On 26 April 2025 vs (Saudi Arabia) Al Ahli)
- Youngest goal scorers: Suphanat Mueanta ~ 15 years 9 months 24 days old (On 26 May 2018 vs Air Force United)
- Oldest goal scorers: Theerathon Bunmathan ~ 35 years 6 months 10 days old (On 16 August 2025 vs Lamphun Warriors)

== Notable players ==
As of 2026–27 season.

=== International capped players ===
AFC/OFC.: (Australia) Brandon O'Neill; (Australia) Curtis Good; (Indonesia) Sandy Walsh; (Indonesia) Shayne Pattynama; (Iran) Reza Asadi; (Iraq) Rebin Sulaka; (Japan) Hajime Hosogai; (Malaysia) Dion Cools; (Myanmar) Aung Thu; (Australia) Kayne Vincent; (Philippines) Diego Bardanca; (Philippines) Javier Patiño; (Philippines) Jefferson Tabinas; (Philippines) Kevin Ingreso; (Philippines) Neil Etheridge; (Philippines) Stephan Palla; (Singapore) Ilhan Fandi; (South Korea) Han Jae-woong; (South Korea) Kim Min-hyeok; (South Korea) Ko Myeong-seok; (Uzbekistan) Akbar Ismatullaev; (Uzbekistan) Asqar Jadigerov; (Uzbekistan) Anvar Rajabov; (Vietnam) Hoàng Vũ Samson; (Vietnam) Lương Xuân Trường	CAF.: (Cameroon) Clarence Bitang; (Cameroon) Frank Acheampong; (Cameroon) Franck Ohandza; (Cameroon) John Mary; (Democratic Republic of the Congo) Jonathan Bolingi; (Ghana) Emmanuel Toku; (Ghana) Kingsley Schindler; (Guinea) Lonsana Doumbouya; (Guinea-Bissau) Marcelo Djaló; (Kenya) Ayub Masika; (Mali) Modibo Maïga	UEFA.: (Austria) Peter Žulj; (Austria) Robert Žulj; (Azerbaijan) Ramil Sheydayev; (Croatia) Renato Kelić; (Denmark) Kasper Junker; (England) Jay Simpson; (Germany) Robert Bauer; (Iceland) Sölvi Ottesen; (Italy) Nicolao Dumitru; (Montenegro) Đorđije Ćetković; (Montenegro) Filip Stojković; (Montenegro) Vukan Savicevic; (Montenegro) Marko Ćetković; (Netherlands) Nacer Barazite; (Portugal) Bruno Moreira; (Romania) Alexandru Tudorie; (Serbia) Đorđe Despotović; (Serbia) Fejsal Mulić; (Serbia) Goran Čaušić; (Serbia) Uros Radakovic; (Serbia) Marko Šćepović; (Spain) Bruno Herrero; (Spain) Carmelo González; (Spain) Jesús Berrocal; (Spain) Sebas Moyano; (Spain) Toni Moya; (Slovenia) Haris Vučkić; (Sweden) Rasmus Jönsson	CONMEBOL/ CONCACAF.: (Argentina) Leandro Torres; (Brazil) Diogo Luis Santo; (Brazil) Nathan Pelea; (Brazil) Wanderson Caju; (Brazil) Edgar; (Brazil) Maicon Marques; (Brazil) Osvaldo; (Chile) Ramsés Bustos; (Venezuela) Andrés Túñez

== Managerial history ==
List of former Buriram United managers (2001–present)

Buriram United managers list
Name	Period	Honours
(Thailand) Prapol Pongpanich	2001 – May 2009	2008 Thailand Premier League
(Thailand) Thongsuk Sampahungsith	May 2009 – October 2009	
(Thailand) Thanadech Fuprasert	November 2009 – May 2010	
(Thailand) Attaphol Buspakom	20 January 2010 – 2 May 2013	2011 Thai Premier League; 2011 Thai FA Cup; 2011 Thai League Cup; 2012 Toyota Premier Cup; 2012 Thai FA Cup; 2012 Thai League Cup; 2013 Kor Royal Cup
(England) Scott Cooper	May 2013 – September 2013	
(Spain) Alejandro Menéndez	September 2013–11 April 2014	2013 Thai Premier League; 2013 Thai FA Cup; 2013 Thai League Cup; 2014 Toyota Premier Cup; 2014 Kor Royal Cup
(Montenegro) Božidar Bandović	11 April 2014 – 7 June 2014	
(Brazil) Alexandre Gama	8 June 2014 – 22 May 2016	2014 Thai Premier League; 2015 Kor Royal Cup; 2015 Thai Premier League; 2015 Thai FA Cup; 2015 Thai League Cup; 2015 Mekong Club Championship; 2016 Toyota Premier Cup; 2016 Kor Royal Cup
(Iran) Afshin Ghotbi	24 May 2016 – 20 August 2016	
(Serbia) Ranko Popović	25 August 2016 – 13 June 2017	2016 Thai League Cup; 2016 Mekong Club Championship
(Montenegro) Božidar Bandović (2)	14 June 2017 – 19 October 2020	2017 Thai League T1; 2018 Thai League 1; 2019 Thailand Champions Cup
(Brazil) Alexandre Gama	22 October 2020 – 28 November 2021	
(Japan) Masatada Ishii	1 December 2021 – 13 August 2023	2021–22 Thai League 1; 2021–22 Thai FA Cup; 2021–22 Thai League Cup; 2022–23 Thai League 1; 2022–23 Thai FA Cup; 2022–23 Thai League Cup
(Australia) Arthur Papas	13 August 2023 – 21 March 2024	
(Brazil) Jorginho	25 March 2024 – 21 May 2024	2023–24 Thai League 1
(Brazil) Osmar Loss	26 June 2024 – 7 October 2025	2024–25 Thai League 1; 2024–25 Thai FA Cup; 2024–25 Thai League Cup; 2024–25 ASEAN Club Championship
(Brazil) Emerson Pereira (interim)	7 October 2025 – 15 October 2025	
(England) Mark Jackson	15 October 2025 – 5 September 2026	2025–26 Thai League 1; 2025–26 Thai FA Cup; 2025–26 ASEAN Club Championship
(Brazil) Emerson Pereira (caretaker) (2)	5 September 2026 – 7 September 2026	
(Portugal) Mário Silva	8 September 2026 – 30 October 2026	
(Spain) Raúl Caneda	31 October 2026 – present	

=== Most trophies won as a head coach ===
As of 27 May 2025

Key to honours:

- T1 = Thai League 1
- FA = Thai FA Cup
- LC = Thai League Cup
- CC = Thailand Champions Cup/Kor Royal Cup
- AFF = ASEAN Club Championship

Name	T1	FA	LC	CC	AFF	Total
(Japan) Masatada Ishii	2	2	2	0	0	6
(Brazil) Alexandre Gama	2	1	1	2	0	6
(Thailand) Attaphol Buspakom	1	2	2	1	0	6
(Brazil) Osmar Loss	1	1	1	0	1	4
(Spain) Alejandro Menéndez	1	1	1	1	0	4
(Montenegro) Božidar Bandović	2	0	0	1	0	3
(England) Mark Jackson	1	1	0	0	1	3
(Brazil) Jorginho Campos	1	0	0	0	0	1
(Thailand) Prapol Pongpanich	1	0	0	0	0	1
(Serbia) Ranko Popović	0	0	1	0	0	1
Total	12	8	8	5	2	35

== Season by season record ==
Season	League									FA Cup	League Cup	Kor Cup / Champions Cup	ACL Elite	Other	Top scorer	
Season	Division	P	W	D	L	F	A	Pts	Pos	FA Cup	League Cup	Kor Cup / Champions Cup	ACL Elite	Other	Name	Goals
2004–05	TPL	18	9	5	4	23	19	32	2nd			–	–	–	Supakit Jinajai	10
2006	TPL	22	6	4	12	23	32	22	10th			RU	DQ	–	Supakit Jinajai	7
2007	TPL	30	13	3	14	35	40	42	8th			–	–	–	Tana Chanabut	7
2008	TPL	30	18	7	5	38	15	61	1st			–	–	–	Ronnachai Rangsiyo	16
2009	TPL	30	9	9	12	37	41	36	9th	R4		RU	PR	Queen's Cup – KR; AFC Cup – GS	Suriya Domtaisong	9
2010	TPL	30	17	12	1	51	19	63	2nd	R4	RU	–	–	–	Suchao Nuchnum	11
2011	TPL	34	26	7	1	64	15	85	1st	W	W	–	–	–	Franck Ohandza	19
2012	TPL	34	14	12	8	60	40	54	4th	W	W	RU	GS	–	Frank Acheampong	12
2013	TPL	32	23	9	0	73	23	78	1st	W	W	W	QF	–	Carmelo González	23
2014	TPL	38	23	10	5	69	26	79	1st	R4	RU	W	GS	–	Javier Patiño	21
2015	TPL	34	25	9	0	98	24	84	1st	W	W	W	GS	Mekong Club – W	Diogo	33
2016	TL	30	15	10	5	55	38	55	4th	R3	W	W	GS	Mekong Club – W	Diogo	11
2017	T1	34	27	5	2	85	22	86	1st	QF	QF	–	–	–	Jajá	34
2018	T1	34	28	3	3	76	25	87	1st	RU	SF	RU	R16	–	Diogo	34
2019	T1	30	16	10	4	51	25	58	2nd	SF	RU	W	GS	–	Supachok Sarachat	9
2020–21	T1	30	20	3	7	63	26	63	2nd	SF	–	–	PO	–	Supachok Sarachat	10
2021–22	T1	30	19	5	6	48	19	62	1st	W	W	–	–	–	Supachai Chaided	14
2022–23	T1	30	23	5	2	75	27	74	1st	W	W	RU	PO	–	Supachai Chaided	19
2023–24	T1	30	20	9	1	70	27	69	1st	R3	SF	RU	GS	–	Supachai Chaided	21
2024–25	T1	30	22	4	4	92	20	70	1st	W	W	–	QF	ASEAN Club – W	Guilherme Bissoli	25
2025–26	T1	30	22	4	4	76	31	70	1st		SF	–	QF			

Champions	Runners-up	Third Place	Promoted	Relegated

- P = Played
- W = Games won
- D = Games drawn
- L = Games lost
- F = Goals for
- A = Goals against
- Pts = Points
- Pos = Final position
- TPL = Thai Premier League
- TL = Thai League
- T1 = Thai League 1
- DQ = Disqualified
- PR = Preliminary Round
- QR1 = First Qualifying Round
- QR2 = Second Qualifying Round
- QR3 = Third Qualifying Round
- PO = Play-off
- R1 = Round 1
- R2 = Round 2
- R3 = Round 3
- R4 = Round 4
- R5 = Round 5
- R6 = Round 6
- GS = Group Stage
- KR = Knockout Round
- R16 = Round of 16
- QF = Quarter-finals
- SF = Semi-finals
- RU = Runners-up
- S = Shared
- W = Winners

== Continental record ==
Competition	Pld	W	D	L	GF	GA	GD	Win%
AFC Champions League Elite	85	23	27	35	84	125	−41	27.06
AFC Champions League Two	6	3	1	2	12	10	+2	50.00
ASEAN Club Championship	20	9	8	3	42	18	+24	45.00
Mekong Club Championship	3	2	0	1	3	1	+2	66.67

=== Matches ===
Season	Competition	Round	Club	Home	Away	Aggregate
2009	AFC Champions League	Play-off round	Singapore Armed Forces	1–4 (a.e.t.)	—N/a	—N/a
2009	AFC Cup	Group H	(Vietnam) Bình Dương	1–3	1–1	3rd out of 4
2009	AFC Cup	Group H	(Singapore) Home United	2–1	1–3	3rd out of 4
2009	AFC Cup	Group H	(Maldives) Club Valencia	4–1	3–1	3rd out of 4
2012	AFC Champions League	Group H	(Japan) Kashiwa Reysol	3–2	0–1	4th out of 4
2012	AFC Champions League	Group H	(China) Guangzhou	1–2	2–1	4th out of 4
2012	AFC Champions League	Group H	(South Korea) Jeonbuk Hyundai Motors	0–2	2–3	4th out of 4
2013	AFC Champions League	Play-off round	(Australia) Brisbane Roar	0–0 (a.e.t.) (3–0 p)	—N/a	—N/a
2013	AFC Champions League	Group E	(Japan) Vegalta Sendai	1–1	1–1	2nd out of 4
2013	AFC Champions League	Group E	(South Korea) FC Seoul	0–0	2–2	2nd out of 4
2013	AFC Champions League	Group E	(China) Jiangsu	2–0	0–2	2nd out of 4
2013	AFC Champions League	Round of 16	(Uzbekistan) Bunyodkor	2–1	0–0	2–1
2013	AFC Champions League	Quarter-finals	(Iran) Esteghlal	1–2	0–1	1–3
2014	AFC Champions League	Group E	(China) Shandong Taishan	1–0	1–1	3rd out of 4
2014	AFC Champions League	Group E	(South Korea) Pohang Steelers	1–2	0–0	3rd out of 4
2014	AFC Champions League	Group E	(Japan) Cerezo Osaka	2–2	0–4	3rd out of 4
2015	AFC Champions League	Group F	(South Korea) Seongnam FC	2–1	1–2	3rd out of 4
2015	AFC Champions League	Group F	(China) Guangzhou City	5–0	2–1	3rd out of 4
2015	AFC Champions League	Group F	(Japan) Gamba Osaka	1–2	1–1	3rd out of 4
2015	Mekong Club Championship	Final	(Cambodia) Boeung Ket Angkor	1–0		
2016	AFC Champions League	Group F	(South Korea) FC Seoul	0–6	1–2	4th out of 4
2016	AFC Champions League	Group F	(China) Shandong Taishan	0–0	0–3	4th out of 4
2016	AFC Champions League	Group F	(Japan) Sanfrecce Hiroshima	0–2	0–3	4th out of 4
2016	Mekong Club Championship	Final	(Laos) Lanexang United	2–0	0–1	2–1
2018	AFC Champions League	Group G	(South Korea) Jeju United	0–2	1–0	2nd out of 4
2018	AFC Champions League	Group G	(China) Guangzhou	1–1	1–1	2nd out of 4
2018	AFC Champions League	Group G	(Japan) Cerezo Osaka	2–0	2–2	2nd out of 4
2018	AFC Champions League	Round of 16	(South Korea) Jeonbuk Hyundai Motors	3–2	0–2	3–4
2019	AFC Champions League	Group G	(Japan) Urawa Red Diamonds	1–2	0–3	4th out of 4
2019	AFC Champions League	Group G	(South Korea) Jeonbuk Hyundai Motors	1–0	0–0	4th out of 4
2019	AFC Champions League	Group G	(China) Beijing Guoan	1–3	0–2	4th out of 4
2020	AFC Champions League	Preliminary round 2	(Vietnam) Hồ Chí Minh City	2–1	—N/a	—N/a
2020	AFC Champions League	Play-off round	(China) Shanghai Port	—N/a	0–3	—N/a
2022	AFC Champions League	Play-off round	(South Korea) Daegu FC	—N/a	1–1 (a.e.t.) (2–3 p)	—N/a
2023–24	AFC Champions League	Group H	(China) Zhejiang	4–1	2–3	4th out of 4
2023–24	AFC Champions League	Group H	(Japan) Ventforet Kofu	2–3	0–1	4th out of 4
2023–24	AFC Champions League	Group H	(Australia) Melbourne City	0–2	1–0	4th out of 4
2024–25	AFC Champions League Elite	League stage	(Japan) Vissel Kobe	0–0	—N/a	6th out of 12
2024–25	AFC Champions League Elite	League stage	(Australia) Central Coast Mariners	—N/a	2–1	6th out of 12
2024–25	AFC Champions League Elite	League stage	(South Korea) Pohang Steelers	1–0	—N/a	6th out of 12
2024–25	AFC Champions League Elite	League stage	(Japan) Yokohama F. Marinos	—N/a	0–5	6th out of 12
2024–25	AFC Champions League Elite	League stage	(Japan) Kawasaki Frontale	0–3	—N/a	6th out of 12
2024–25	AFC Champions League Elite	League stage	(Malaysia) Johor Darul Ta'zim	—N/a	0–0	6th out of 12
2024–25	AFC Champions League Elite	League stage	(South Korea) Ulsan HD	2–1	—N/a	6th out of 12
2024–25	AFC Champions League Elite	League stage	(South Korea) Gwangju	—N/a	2–2	6th out of 12
2024–25	AFC Champions League Elite	Round of 16	(Malaysia) Johor Darul Ta'zim	0–0	1–0	1–0
2024–25	AFC Champions League Elite	Quarter-finals	(Saudi Arabia) Al-Ahli	0–3		
2024–25	ASEAN Club Championship	Group B	(Vietnam) Công An Hà Nội	—N/a	1–2	2nd out of 6
2024–25	ASEAN Club Championship	Group B	(Philippines) Kaya–Iloilo	7–0	—N/a	2nd out of 6
2024–25	ASEAN Club Championship	Group B	(Indonesia) Borneo Samarinda	4–0	—N/a	2nd out of 6
2024–25	ASEAN Club Championship	Group B	(Singapore) Lion City Sailors	—N/a	0–0	2nd out of 6
2024–25	ASEAN Club Championship	Group B	(Malaysia) Kuala Lumpur City	1–0	—N/a	2nd out of 6
2024–25	ASEAN Club Championship	Semi-finals	(Thailand) BG Pathum United	3–1	0–0	3–1
2024–25	ASEAN Club Championship	Final	(Vietnam) Công An Hà Nội	3–3 (a.e.t.) (3–2 p)	2–2	5–5 (a.e.t.) (3–2 p)
2025–26	AFC Champions League Elite	League stage	(Malaysia) Johor Darul Ta'zim	2–1	—N/a	4th out of 12
2025–26	AFC Champions League Elite	League stage	(South Korea) FC Seoul	—N/a	0–3	4th out of 12
2025–26	AFC Champions League Elite	League stage	(Australia) Melbourne City	—N/a	1–2	4th out of 12
2025–26	AFC Champions League Elite	League stage	(China) Shanghai Port	2–0	—N/a	4th out of 12
2025–26	AFC Champions League Elite	League stage	(South Korea) Ulsan HD	—N/a	0–0	4th out of 12
2025–26	AFC Champions League Elite	League stage	(South Korea) Gangwon	2–2	—N/a	4th out of 12
2025–26	AFC Champions League Elite	League stage	(China) Chengdu Rongcheng	—N/a	1–0	4th out of 12
2025–26	AFC Champions League Elite	League stage	(China) Shanghai Shenhua	2–0	—N/a	4th out of 12
2025–26	AFC Champions League Elite	Round of 16	(Australia) Melbourne City	0–0 (a.e.t.) (4–2 p)	1–1	1–1 (a.e.t.) (4–2 p)
2025–26	AFC Champions League Elite	Quarter-finals	(United Arab Emirates) Shabab Al-Ahli	2–3 (a.e.t.)		
2025–26	ASEAN Club Championship	Group A	(Malaysia) Selangor	1–1	—N/a	1st out of 6
2025–26	ASEAN Club Championship	Group A	(Thailand) BG Pathum United	—N/a	2–2	1st out of 6
2025–26	ASEAN Club Championship	Group A	(Vietnam) Công An Hà Nội	1–1	—N/a	1st out of 6
2025–26	ASEAN Club Championship	Group A	(Singapore) Tampines Rovers	—N/a	4–1	1st out of 6
2025–26	ASEAN Club Championship	Group A	(Philippines) DH Cebu	6–0	—N/a	1st out of 6
2025–26	ASEAN Club Championship	Semi-finals	(Malaysia) Johor Darul Ta'zim	1–2 (a.e.t.)	3–1	4–3
2025–26	ASEAN Club Championship	Final	(Malaysia) Selangor	2–1	1–0	3–1
2026–27	AFC Champions League Elite	League stage	(Malaysia) Johor Darul Ta'zim	—N/a	1–1	
2026–27	AFC Champions League Elite	League stage	(China) Beijing Guoan	0–1	—N/a	
2026–27	AFC Champions League Elite	League stage	(Japan) Gamba Osaka	—N/a	1–1	
2026–27	AFC Champions League Elite	League stage	(Japan) Kashima Antlers	0–0	—N/a	
2026–27	AFC Champions League Elite	League stage	(China) Shanghai Port	—N/a		
2026–27	AFC Champions League Elite	League stage	(Japan) Kyoto Sanga		—N/a	
2026–27	AFC Champions League Elite	League stage	(Japan) Kashiwa Reysol	—N/a		
2026–27	AFC Champions League Elite	League stage	(Japan) Vissel Kobe		—N/a	
2026–27	ASEAN Club Championship	Group A	(Indonesia) Borneo Samarinda	0–0	—N/a	
2026–27	ASEAN Club Championship	Group A	(Vietnam) Công An Hồ Chí Minh City	—N/a	0–1	
2026–27	ASEAN Club Championship	Group A	(Philippines) Manila Digger	—N/a		
2026–27	ASEAN Club Championship	Group A	(Malaysia) Kuching City	—N/a		
2026–27	ASEAN Club Championship	Group A	(Thailand) Ratchaburi		—N/a	
2026–27	ASEAN Club Championship	Group A	(Singapore) Tampines Rovers		—N/a	

=== By country ===
Country	Pld	W	D	L	GF	GA	GD	Win%
Australia	7	2	3	2	5	6	−1	28.57
Cambodia	1	1	0	0	1	0	+1	100.00
China	21	9	4	8	28	25	+3	42.86
Indonesia	2	1	1	0	4	0	+4	50.00
Iran	2	0	0	2	1	3	−2	0.00
Japan	21	2	8	11	17	39	−22	9.52
Laos	2	1	0	1	2	1	+1	50.00
Malaysia	11	6	4	1	13	7	+6	54.55
Maldives	2	2	0	0	7	2	+5	100.00
Philippines	2	2	0	0	13	0	+13	100.00
Saudi Arabia	1	0	0	1	0	3	−3	0.00
Singapore	5	2	1	2	8	9	−1	40.00
South Korea	23	6	8	9	20	35	−15	26.09
Thailand	3	1	2	0	5	3	+2	33.33
United Arab Emirates	1	0	0	1	2	3	−1	0.00
Uzbekistan	2	1	1	0	2	1	+1	50.00
Vietnam	8	1	4	3	11	14	−3	12.50
Total	109	37	33	39	138	148	−10	33.94

=== By club ===
Country	Pld	W	D	L	GF	GA	GD	Win%
(Saudi Arabia) Al-Ahli	1	0	0	1	0	3	−3	0.00
(Vietnam) Becamex Hồ Chí Minh City	2	0	1	1	2	4	−2	0.00
(China) Beijing Guoan	3	0	0	3	1	6	−5	0.00
(Thailand) BG Pathum United	3	1	2	0	5	3	+2	33.33
(Cambodia) Boeung Ket	1	1	0	0	1	0	+1	100.00
(Indonesia) Borneo Samarinda	2	1	1	0	4	0	+4	50.00
(Australia) Brisbane Roar	1	0	1	0	0	0	+0	0.00
(Uzbekistan) Bunyodkor	2	1	1	0	2	1	+1	50.00
(Philippines) Cebu	1	1	0	0	6	0	+6	100.00
(Australia) Central Coast Mariners	1	1	0	0	2	1	+1	100.00
(Japan) Cerezo Osaka	4	1	2	1	6	8	−2	25.00
(China) Chengdu Rongcheng	1	1	0	0	1	0	+1	100.00
(Maldives) Club Valencia	2	2	0	0	7	2	+5	100.00
(Vietnam) Công An Hà Nội	4	0	3	1	7	8	−1	0.00
(Vietnam) Công An Hồ Chí Minh City	2	1	0	1	2	2	+0	50.00
(South Korea) Daegu FC	1	0	1	0	1	1	+0	0.00
(Iran) Esteghlal	2	0	0	2	1	3	−2	0.00
(South Korea) FC Seoul	5	0	2	3	3	13	−10	0.00
(Japan) Gamba Osaka	3	0	2	1	4	5	−1	0.00
(South Korea) Gangwon	1	0	1	0	2	2	+0	0.00
(China) Guangzhou	4	1	2	1	5	5	+0	25.00
(China) Guangzhou City	2	2	0	0	7	1	+6	100.00
(South Korea) Gwangju FC	1	0	1	0	2	2	+0	0.00
(South Korea) Jeju SK	2	1	0	1	1	2	−1	50.00
(South Korea) Jeonbuk Hyundai Motors	6	2	1	3	6	9	−3	33.33
(China) Jiangsu	2	1	0	1	2	2	+0	50.00
(Malaysia) Johor Darul Ta'zim	7	3	3	1	8	5	+3	42.86
(Japan) Kashiwa Reysol	2	1	0	1	3	3	+0	50.00
(Japan) Kawasaki Frontale	1	0	0	1	0	3	−3	0.00
(Philippines) Kaya–Iloilo	1	1	0	0	7	0	+7	100.00
(Malaysia) Kuala Lumpur City	1	1	0	0	1	0	+1	100.00
(Laos) Lanexang United	2	1	0	1	2	1	+1	50.00
(Singapore) Lion City Sailors	3	1	1	1	3	4	−1	33.33
(Australia) Melbourne City	5	1	2	2	3	5	−2	20.00
(South Korea) Pohang Steelers	3	1	1	1	2	2	+0	33.33
(Japan) Sanfrecce Hiroshima	2	0	0	2	0	5	−5	0.00
(Malaysia) Selangor	3	2	1	0	4	2	+2	66.67
(South Korea) Seongnam FC	2	1	0	1	3	3	+0	50.00
(United Arab Emirates) Shabab Al-Ahli	1	0	0	1	2	3	−1	0.00
(China) Shandong Taishan	4	1	2	1	2	4	−2	25.00
(China) Shanghai Port	2	1	0	1	2	3	−1	50.00
(China) Shanghai Shenhua	1	1	0	0	2	0	+2	100.00
(Singapore) Tampines Rovers	1	1	0	0	4	1	+3	100.00
(South Korea) Ulsan HD	2	1	1	0	2	1	+1	50.00
(Japan) Urawa Red Diamonds	2	0	0	2	1	5	−4	0.00
(Japan) Vegalta Sendai	2	0	2	0	2	2	+0	0.00
(Japan) Ventforet Kofu	2	0	0	2	2	4	−2	0.00
(Japan) Vissel Kobe	1	0	1	0	0	0	+0	0.00
(Singapore) Warriors	1	0	0	1	1	4	−3	0.00
(Japan) Yokohama F. Marinos	1	0	0	1	0	5	−5	0.00
(China) Zhejiang	2	1	0	1	6	4	+2	50.00
