= Toyota Premier Cup =

- Founded: 2011
- Abolished: 2017
- Region: Thailand; Japan
- Teams: 2
- Last champions: (Japan) Sanfrecce Hiroshima (1st title)
- Most championships: (Thailand) Buriram United (3 titles)

The Toyota Premier Cup was a single-game cup competition organized by the Toyota and Football Association of Thailand and was first played in 2011. It features the winners of the Thai League Cup and an invited team from the J1 League. The competition sponsor was Toyota Motor (Thailand) Co., Ltd.

Since 2018 Toyota, sponsor for this tournament decided to abolished the tournament.

== Results ==
Year	Winner	Score	Runner-up	Stadium
2011; Details	(Thailand); Port	2–1	(Japan); Shonan Bellmare	Suphachalasai Stadium, Bangkok
2012; Details	(Thailand); Buriram United	1–1 (4–2p)	(Japan); Vegalta Sendai	Suphachalasai Stadium, Bangkok
2013; Details	(Japan); Nagoya Grampus	2–0	(Thailand); Buriram United	Suphachalasai Stadium, Bangkok
2014; Details	(Thailand); Buriram United	1–1 (4–3p)	(Japan); Nagoya Grampus	Thammasat Stadium, Pathum Thani
2015; Details	(Thailand); BEC Tero Sasana	0–0 (4–3p)	(Japan); Sagan Tosu	Suphachalasai Stadium, Bangkok
2016; Details	(Thailand); Buriram United	2–1	(Japan); Albirex Niigata	I-Mobile Stadium, Buriram
2017; Details	(Japan); Sanfrecce Hiroshima	3–1	(Thailand); Muangthong United	Suphachalasai Stadium, Bangkok

== Statistics ==
=== Performance by club ===
Team	Champions	Runners-up
(Thailand) Buriram United	3 (2012, 2014, 2016)	1 (2013)
(Japan) Nagoya Grampus	1 (2013)	1 (2014)
(Thailand) Port	1 (2011)	0
(Thailand) BEC Tero Sasana	1 (2015)	0
(Japan) Sanfrecce Hiroshima	1 (2017)	0
(Japan) Shonan Bellmare	0	1 (2011)
(Japan) Vegalta Sendai	0	1 (2012)
(Japan) Sagan Tosu	0	1 (2015)
(Japan) Albirex Niigata	0	1 (2016)
(Thailand) Muangthong United	0	1 (2017)

=== Performance by nation ===
#	Nation	Champions	Runners-up
1	Thailand	5	2
2	Japan	2	5

=== Participating by club ===
Team	Joined	Years
(Thailand) Buriram United	4	**2012**, 2013, **2014**, **2016**
(Japan) Nagoya Grampus	2	**2013**, 2014
(Thailand) Port	1	**2011**
(Japan) Shonan Bellmare	1	2011
(Japan) Vegalta Sendai	1	2012
(Thailand) BEC Tero Sasana	1	**2015**
(Japan) Sagan Tosu	1	2015
(Japan) Albirex Niigata	1	2016
(Japan) Sanfrecce Hiroshima	1	**2017**
(Thailand) Muangthong United	1	2017

Bold = winners
