= 2012 Buriram United F.C. season =

Buriram United
2012 season
- Chairman: Newin Chidchob
- Manager: Attaphol Buspakom
- Thai Premier League: 4th
- FA Cup: Winners
- League Cup: Winners
- Top goalscorer: League: Frank Acheampong (12 goals); All: Goran Jerkovic (13 goals)
| Home colours | Away colours |

The 2012 season was Buriram United's eighth season in the top division of Thai football. The club competed in the 2012 Thai Premier League, 2012 Thai FA Cup, 2012 Thai League Cup, and the 2012 AFC Champions League.

== Players ==
=== First team squad ===
As of 9 March 2012 Note: Flags indicate national team as defined under FIFA eligibility rules; some limited exceptions apply. Players may hold more than one non-FIFA nationality.

| No. | Pos. | Nation | Player |
|---|---|---|---|
| 1 | GK | THA | Sivaruck Tedsungnoen |
| 2 | DF | THA | Theeratorn Boonmatan |
| 3 | DF | THA | Pratum Chuthong |
| 4 | DF | JPN | Shinnosuke Honda |
| 5 | DF | CMR | Ekwalla Herman |
| 6 | MF | THA | Jakkraphan Kaewprom |
| 7 | MF | THA | Sumanya Purisai |
| 8 | MF | THA | Suchao Nuchnum (vice-captain) |
| 9 | FW | THA | Suriya Domtaisong |
| 11 | DF | THA | Apichet Puttan (captain) |
| 12 | FW | THA | Sarif Sainui |
| 13 | MF | THA | Kriangkrai Ura-ngam |
| 14 | FW | CMR | Frank Ohandza |
| 15 | MF | THA | Ekkachai Sumrei |

| No. | Pos. | Nation | Player |
|---|---|---|---|
| 17 | FW | THA | Supakit Jinajai |
| 18 | FW | CMR | John Mary |
| 19 | DF | THA | Chitipat Tanklang |
| 21 | MF | THA | Jirawat Makarom |
| 22 | MF | THA | Adisak Kraisorn |
| 23 | MF | THA | Surat Sukha |
| 24 | DF | THA | Piyarat Lajungreed |
| 25 | GK | THA | Kittikun Jamsuwan |
| 26 | DF | THA | Chalermpong Kerdkaew |
| 28 | MF | UZB | Asqar Jadigerov |
| 30 | FW | GHA | Frank Acheampong |
| 33 | FW | THA | Somjet Sattabud |
| 34 | GK | THA | Yotsapon Teangdar |
| 40 | FW | FRA | Goran Jerković |

== Competitions ==
=== Pre-season/friendly ===
Win Draw Loss

| 9 February 2012 Friendly | Laos | 0–2 | Buriram United | Vientiane, Laos |
| 16:00 (UTC+7) | | Report | Acheampong 14'; Somjet 85' | Stadium: New Laos National Stadium |

| 25 February 2012 Friendly | Wuachon United | 1–0 | Buriram United | Songkhla |
| 17:00 | Aron da Silva 45' | Report | | Stadium: Jiranakorn Stadium |

| 4 March 2012 Friendly | Buriram United | 4–2 | Nakhon Ratchasima | Buriram |
| 18:00 (UTC+7) | | | | Stadium: Thunder Castle Stadium |

=== Toyota Premier Cup ===
Win Draw Loss

| 18 February 2012 Final | Buriram United (Thailand) | 1–1 (4−2 p) | (Japan) Vegalta Sendai | Pathum Wan, Bangkok |
| 16:00 (UTC+7) | Acheampong 37' | Report | Ota 73' | Stadium: Supachalasai Stadium |
| | Penalties |
| | Suchao (penalty scored); Jirawat (penalty scored); Pratum (penalty scored); Sumanya (penalty scored) | | (penalty scored) Kakuda; (penalty missed) Kamata; (penalty scored) Ota; (penalty missed) Yanagisawa |

=== Kor Royal Cup ===
Win Draw Loss

| 11 March 2012 Final | Buriram United | 2–2 (3−4 p) | Chonburi | Pathum Wan, Bangkok |
| 18:30 (UTC+7) | Jadigerov 31'; Acheampong 33' | Report | Adul 45'; Ludovick 90' | Stadium: Suphachalasai Stadium; Referee: Apisit Aonrak |
| | Penalties |
| | Jirawat (penalty missed); Suchao (penalty scored); Theeratorn (penalty scored); Pratum (penalty missed); Herman (penalty scored); Ohandza (penalty missed) | | (penalty scored) Diakité; (penalty missed) Akarawin; (penalty missed) Sukree; (penalty scored) Adul; (penalty scored) Therdsak; (penalty scored) Kushida |

=== Thai Premier League ===
==== League table ====
| Pos | Team | Pld | W | D | L | GF | GA | GD | Pts | Qualification or relegation |
|---|---|---|---|---|---|---|---|---|---|---|
| 2 | Chonburi | 34 | 21 | 7 | 6 | 65 | 33 | +32 | 70 | |
| 3 | BEC Tero Sasana | 34 | 16 | 9 | 9 | 53 | 43 | +10 | 57 | |
| 4 | Buriram United | 34 | 14 | 12 | 8 | 60 | 40 | +20 | 54 | 2013 AFC Champions League Qualifying play-off (Note: Buriram United qualified for the 2013 AFC Champions League as winners of the 2012 Thai FA Cup.) |
| 5 | Osotspa Saraburi | 34 | 16 | 4 | 14 | 55 | 48 | +7 | 52 | |
| 6 | Esan United | 34 | 11 | 14 | 9 | 41 | 42 | −1 | 47 | |

Updated to match(es) played on 28 October 2012. Source: Thai Premier League
Rules for classification: 1st points; 2nd head-to-head (only match result, not used aggregate); 3rd match win; 4th goal difference; 5th goals scored.

==== Matches ====
| 17 March 2012 1 | Buriram United | 3–1 | Chiangrai United | Thunder Castle Stadium |
| 18:00 | Herman 8', 23'; Ohandza 72' | report(Thai) | Wasan 79' | Attendance: 9,763; Referee: Thaweechai Supattrarawan |

| 25 March 2012 2 | Buriram United | 3–0 | BBCU | Thunder Castle Stadium |
| 18:00 | Florent Obama 6'; Suriya 86'; Acheampong 90+2' | report(Thai) | | Attendance: 11,807; Referee: Chaireag Ngamsom |

| 31 March 2012 3 | Buriram United | 4–2 | Osotspa Saraburi | Thunder Castle Stadium |
| 18:00 | Herman 20'; Ohandza 56', 90+3'; Suchao 72' | report(Thai) | Yamamoto 50'; Herman 55' (o.g.) | Attendance: 12,685; Referee: Apisit Aonrak |

| 8 April 2012 4 | Jenifood Samut Songkhram | 0–3 | Buriram United | Samut Songkhram Stadium |
| 18:00 |

| 22 April 2012 5 | Buriram United | 1–1 | Army United | Thunder Castle Stadium |
| 18:00 | | Report | | Attendance: 15,080 |

| 7 May 2012 6 | Buriram United | 0–0 | Wuachon United | Thunder Castle Stadium |
| 18:00 | | Report | | Attendance: 14,492 |

| 26 May 2012 7 | Bangkok Glass | 1–2 | Buriram United | Leo Stadium |
| 18:00 | | | | Attendance: 10,091 |

| 30 May 2012 8 | Buriram United | 1–1 | SCG Muangthong United | Thunder Castle Stadium |
| 19:00 | | | | Attendance: 22,576 |

| 2 June 2012 9 | Chainat | 0–3 | Buriram United | Khao Plong Stadium |
| 18:00 | | | | Attendance: 5,316 |

| 13 June 2012 10 | Buriram United | 1–1 | Pattaya United | Thunder Castle Stadium |
| 19:00 | | | | Attendance: 12,537 |

| 17 June 2012 11 | TTM Chiangmai | 0–2 | Buriram United | 700th Anniversary Stadium |
| 18:00 | | | | Attendance: 2,246 |

| 20 June 2012 12 | BEC Tero Sasana | 0–0 | Buriram United | Thephasadin Stadium |
| 19:00 | | | | Attendance: 5,961 |

| 24 June 2012 13 | Buriram United | 3–4 | Chonburi | Thunder Castle Stadium |
| 18:00 | | | | Attendance: 23,033; Referee: Morakami Nobutsuku (Japan) |

| 30 June 2012 14 | Thai Port | 2–1 | Buriram United | PAT Stadium |
| 17:00 | | | | Attendance: 2,495 |

| 8 July 2012 15 | TOT | 0–1 | Buriram United | PAT Stadium |
| 18:00 | | | | Attendance: 3,245 |

| 15 July 2012 16 | Buriram United | 2–2 | INSEE Police United | Thunder Castle Stadium |
| 18:00 | | | | Attendance: 15,183 |

| 22 July 2012 17 | Esan United | 1–1 | Buriram United | Tung Burapha Stadium |
| 18:00 | | | | Attendance: 6,871 |

| 25 July 2012 18 | Buriram United | 2–2 | Esan United | Thunder Castle Stadium |
| 19:00 | | | | Attendance: 14,025 |

| 28 July 2012 19 | INSEE Police United | 0–0 | Buriram United | Thammasat Stadium |
| 19:00 | | | | Attendance: 5,813 |

| 5 August 2012 20 | Buriram United | 2–1 | TOT | Thunder Castle Stadium |
| 18:00 | | | | Attendance: 16,057 |

| 8 August 2012 21 | Pattaya United | 1–0 | Buriram United | Nongprue Municipality Football Field |
| 19:00 | | | | Attendance: 3,678 |

| 11 August 2012 22 | Buriram United | 7–2 | Chainat | Thunder Castle Stadium |
| 18:00 | | | | Attendance: 16,450 |

| 19 August 2012 23 | SCG Muangthong United | 1–1 | Buriram United | Thunder Castle Stadium |
| 18:00 | | | | Attendance: 13,548 |

| 25 August 2012 24 | Buriram United | 3–2 | Bangkok Glass | Thunder Castle Stadium |
| 18:00 | | | | Attendance: 18,081 |

| 1 September 2012 25 | Buriram United | 1–0 | TTM Chiangmai | Thunder Castle Stadium |
| 18:00 | | | | Attendance: 12,853 |

| 8 September 2012 26 | Chonburi | 4–2 | Buriram United | Chonburi Stadium |
| 18:30 | | | | Attendance: 8,565 |

| 15 September 2012 27 | Buriram United | 1–0 | Thai Port | Thunder Castle Stadium |
| 18:00 | | | | Attendance: 16,540 |

| 22 September 2012 28 | Wuachon United | 2–1 | Buriram United | Tinasulanon Stadium |
| 18:00 | | | | Attendance: 7,416 |

| 29 September 2012 29 | Buriram United | 0–1 | BEC Tero Sasana | Thunder Castle Stadium |
| 18:00 | | | | Attendance: 16,291 |

| 7 October 2012 30 | Army United | 3–3 | Buriram United | Thai Army Sports Stadium |
| 18:00 | | | | Attendance: 3,466 |

| 10 October 2012 31 | Buriram United | 0–0 | Jenifood Samut Songkhram | Thunder Castle Stadium |
| 18:00 | | | | Attendance: 12,962 |

| 14 October 2012 32 | Osotspa M-150 Saraburi | 2–1 | Buriram United | Saraburi Stadium |
| 18:00 | | | | Attendance: 4,538 |

| 21 October 2012 33 | BBCU | 1–4 | Buriram United | Rajamangala Stadium |
| 18:00 | | | | Attendance: 1,655 |

| 28 October 2012 34 | Chiangrai United | 2–1 | Buriram United | United Stadium of Chiangrai |
| 18:00 |

=== Thai FA Cup ===
Win Draw Loss

| 1 August 2012 Third Round | Buriram United | 3–2 | Chonburi | Thunder Castle Stadium |
| 19:00 (UTC+07:00) | Acheampong 47'; Jerkovic 68'; Ćetković 88' | Report | Therdsak 7'; Arthit 62' |

| 29 August 2012 Fourth Round | Buriram United | 7–1 | Ratchaburi | Thunder Castle Stadium |
| 19:00 (UTC+07:00) | Đorđije 10', 32'; Jerkovic 20', 26', 87'; Ekkachai 54', 79' | Report | Nares 45' (pen.) |

| 3 October 2012 Quarter-finals | Buriram United | 3–0 | BEC Tero Sasana | Thunder Castle Stadium |
| 19:00 (UTC+07:00) | Herman 49'; Jerkovic 52'; Adisak 72' | Report |

| 25 October 2012 Semi-finals | Bangkok Glass | 0–2 | Buriram United | Rajamangala Stadium |
| 18:00 (UTC+07:00) | | Report | Jerkovic 28', 61' |

| 4 November 2012 Final | Army United | 1–2 | Buriram United | Suphachalasai Stadium |
| 18:00 (UTC+07:00) | Issarapong 81' | Report | Jerković 32', 62' | Referee: Toshimitsu Yoshida (Japan) |

=== Toyota League Cup ===
Win Draw Loss Cancelled

| 10 June 2012 First Round | Roi Et | 2–3 | Buriram United | Roi Et Province Stadium |
| 18:00 (UTC+7) | Kennedy 16'; Thanom 46' | Report | Acheampong 53'; Sarif 90+2'; Suchao 90+4' (pen.) | Referee: Surapon Sawangjit |

| 11 July 2012 Second Round | Hat Yai | 0–1 | Buriram United | Jiranakorn Stadium |
| 18:00 (UTC+7) | | Report | Chalermsuk 50' |

| 22 August 2012 Third Round | Samut Prakan United | 0–1 | Buriram United | Samut Prakan United Stadium |
| 18:00 (UTC+7) | | Report | Honda 45+1' |

| 5 September 2012 Quarter-finals 1st leg | Buriram United | 1–1 | BEC Tero Sasana | Thunder Castle Stadium |
| 18:00 (UTC+7) | Anthony 61' | Report | Cleiton 4' |

| 15 September 2012 Quarter-finals 2nd leg | BEC Tero Sasana | 2–2 (3–3 a agg.) | Buriram United | Thephasadin Stadium |
| 18:00 (UTC+7) | Cleiton 44', 53' | Report | Jerković 73'; Pratum 90+4' | Referee: Pathan Nasawang |

| 26 September 2012 Semi-finals 1st leg | Bangkok Glass | 2–3 | Buriram United | Leo Stadium |
| 18:00 (UTC+7) | Chatree 75'; Ajayi 90+1' | Report | Honda 23'; Jerković 67'; Herman 90+5' (pen.) |

| 17 October 2012 Semi-finals 2 leg | Buriram United | 1–0 (4–2 agg.) | Bangkok Glass | Thunder Castle Stadium |
| 19:00 (UTC+7) | Adisak 76' | Report |

| 10 November 2012 Final | Ratchaburi | 1–4 | Buriram United | Thammasat Stadium |
| 18:00 (UTC+7) | Adisak 64' (o.g.) | Report | Herman 35'; Jerković 43', 87'; Ibáñez 62' |

=== AFC Champions Leagues ===
| Pos | Team | Pld | W | D | L | GF | GA | GD | Pts | Qualification | GEG | KSR | JHM | BRU |
|---|---|---|---|---|---|---|---|---|---|---|---|---|---|---|
| 1 | (China) Guangzhou Evergrande | 6 | 3 | 1 | 2 | 12 | 8 | +4 | 10 (Note: Guangzhou Evergrande and Kashiwa Reysol are ranked by their head-to-head record (Guangzhou Evergrande: 4 pts; Kashiwa Reysol: 1 pt).) | Advance to knockout stage | — | 3–1 | 1–3 | 1–2 |
| 2 | (Japan) Kashiwa Reysol | 6 | 3 | 1 | 2 | 11 | 7 | +4 | 10 | Advance to knockout stage | 0–0 | — | 5–1 | 1–0 |
| 3 | (South Korea) Jeonbuk Hyundai Motors | 6 | 3 | 0 | 3 | 10 | 15 | −5 | 9 | | 1–5 | 0–2 | — | 3–2 |
| 4 | (Thailand) Buriram United | 6 | 2 | 0 | 4 | 8 | 11 | −3 | 6 | | 1–2 | 3–2 | 0–2 | — |

Source: WorldFootball.net
Notes:

| 7 March 2012 Group H | Buriram United (Thailand) | 3 – 2 | (Japan) Kashiwa Reysol | Thunder Castle Stadium, Buriram |
| 18:30 UTC+07:00 | Jirawat 11', 78'; Jadigerov 39' | Report | Tanaka 55'; Sakai 65' | Attendance: 15,089; Referee: Ravshan Irmatov (Uzbekistan) |

| 21 March 2012 Group H | Guangzhou Evergrande (China) | 1–2 | (Thailand) Buriram United | Tianhe Stadium, Guangzhou |
| 20:00 UTC+08:00 | Cléo 69' | Report | Suchao 61' (pen.); Acheampong 79' | Attendance: 38,052; Referee: Andre El Haddad (Lebanon) |

| 4 April 2012 Group H | Buriram United (Thailand) | 0–2 | (South Korea) Jeonbuk Hyundai Motors | Buriram Stadium, Buriram |
| 18:30 UTC+07:00 | | Report | Lee Seung-Hyun 9'; Seo Sang-Min 34' | Attendance: 22,770; Referee: Nawaf Shukralla (Bahrain) |

| 17 April 2012 Group H | Jeonbuk Hyundai Motors (South Korea) | 3–2 | (Thailand) Buriram United | Jeonju World Cup Stadium, Jeonju |
| 19:00 UTC+09:00 | Lee Dong-Gook 25', 27'; Park Won-Jae 80' | Report | Ohandza 20', 56' | Attendance: 6,432; Referee: Mohamed Al Zarooni (UAE) |

| 1 May 2012 Group H | Kashiwa Reysol (Japan) | 1–0 | (Thailand) Buriram United | Hitachi Kashiwa Soccer Stadium, Kashiwa |
| 19:00 UTC+09:00 | Ricardo Lobo (yellow card) 15'; Leandro Domingues 23' (yellow card) 23' | Report | Ekwalla (yellow card) 4' (yellow-red card) 41'<be>Chalermpong Kerdkaew (yellow card) 90' | Attendance: 8,099; Referee: (Saudi Arabia) Khalil Al Ghamdi |

| 15 May 2012 Group H | Buriram United (Thailand) | 1–2 | (China) Guangzhou Evergrande | Buriram Stadium, Buriram |
| 18:30 UTC+07:00 | Suriya 57' | Report | Gao Lin 49'; Conca 90+1' (pen.) | Attendance: 18,000; Referee: Strebre Delovski (Australia) |
