= 2012 Thai FA Cup final =

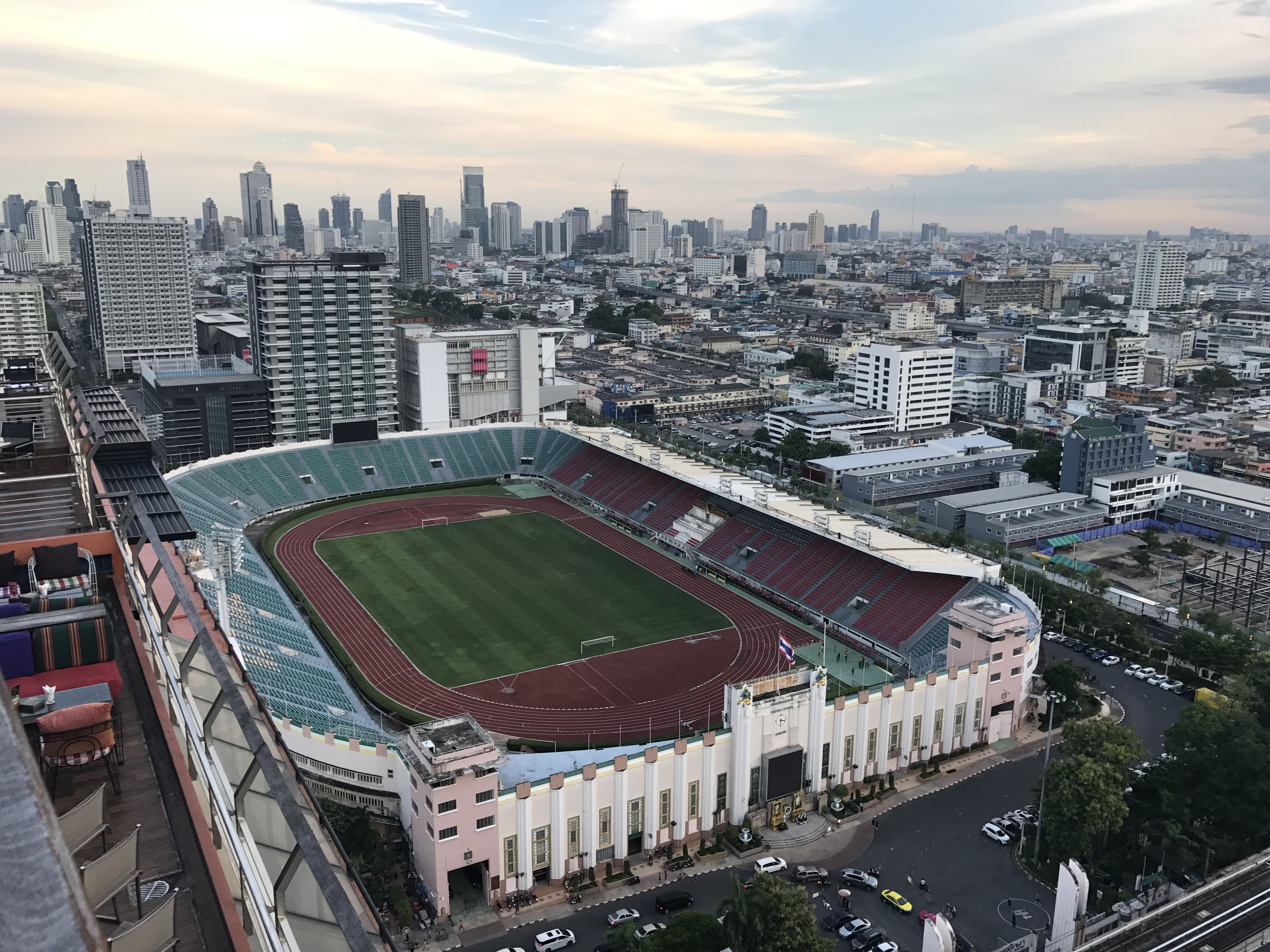
- The match took place at Supachalasai Stadium.
Army United	Buriram United
1	2
- Date: 4 November 2012
- Venue: Suphachalasai Stadium, Bangkok
- Man of the Match: Goran Jerković
- Referee: Toshimitsu Yoshida (Japan)

The 2012 Thai FA Cup final was the 19th final of Thailand's domestic football cup competition, the FA Cup. The final was played at Suphachalasai Stadium in Bangkok on 4 November 2012. The match was contested by Army United, who beat Police United 2–1 in their semi-final, and Buriram United who beat Bangkok Glass 2–0 in the match. After Goran Jerković opened the scoring in 37th minute, Goran Jerković equalised in the 62nd, before Issarapong Lilakorn the different beater to army united and Buriram United beat Army United 2–1 .

== Road to the final ==
Note: In all results below, the score of the finalist is given first (H: home; A: away; TPL: Clubs from Thai Premier League; D1: Clubs from Thai Division 1 League; D2: Clubs from Regional League Division 2). Army United won because Trat players that break the rules.

Army United (TPL)		Round	Buriram United (TPL)	
Opponent	Result	Knockout 1 leg	Opponent	Result
Trat (D2)	Bye (H)	Round of 32	Chonburi (TPL)	3–2 (H)
PTT Rayong (D1)	0–0 (a.e.t.) (3–1p) (A)	Round of 16	Ratchaburi (D1)	7–1 (H)
Muangthong United (TPL)	3–2 (H)	Quarter-finals	BEC Tero Sasana (TPL)	3–0 (H)
Chiangrai United (TPL)	2–1 (N)	Semi-finals	Bangkok Glass (TPL)	2–0 (N)

== Match ==
=== Details ===
4 November 2012
18:00 UTC+7

Army United	1 – 2	Buriram United
Issarapong 81'	Report	Goran Jerković 32', 62'

Suphachalasai Stadium, Bangkok
Referee: Toshimitsu Yoshida (Japan)

Army United	Buriram United

ARMY UNITED:
GK	1	(Thailand) Watcharapong Klahan
DF	24	(Thailand) Prakasit Sansook	(yellow card) 28'	(substituted off) 61'
DF	6	(Argentina) Daniel Blanco
DF	36	(Thailand) Chaiwat Nak-iem
DF	3	(Thailand) Dawuth Dinkhet
DF	17	(Thailand) Weerapong Moolkamsan
MF	27	(Germany) Björn Lindemann
MF	28	(Thailand) Narong Jansawek	(yellow card) 64'	(substituted off) 72'
MF	8	(Thailand) Nipol Kamthong	(yellow card) 40'	(substituted off) 44'
MF	4	(Brazil) Alessandro Alves
FW	9	(Thailand) Tatree Seeha (c)
Substitutes:
DF	32	(Thailand) Suwittaya Namsinlark
MF	2	(Thailand) Tragronchat Thongbai
MF	15	(Thailand) Wanchana Rattana		(substituted on) 72'
FW	11	(Australia) Danny Invincibile		(substituted on) 61'
FW	13	(Thailand) Issarapong Lilakorn		(substituted on) 44'
MF	14	(Thailand) Kraisorn Sriyan
FW	18	(Thailand) Kristsada Kemden
Manager:
(Thailand) Phaniphol Kertyam

BURIRAM UNITED:
GK	1	(Thailand) Sivaruck Tedsungnoen
DF	11	(Thailand) Apichet Puttan (c)	(yellow card) 26'
DF	28	(Spain) Osmar Ibáñez
DF	3	(Thailand) Pratum Chuthong
DF	2	(Thailand) Theeraton Bunmathan
MF	5	(Cameroon) Yves Ekwalla Herman		(substituted off) 57'
MF	6	(Thailand) Jakkraphan Kaewprom		(substituted off) 71'
MF	16	(Thailand) Anthony Ampaipitakwong
MF	23	(Thailand) Surat Sukha	(yellow card) 46'
FW	22	(Thailand) Adisak Kraisorn
FW	40	(France) Goran Jerković		(substituted off) 82'
Substitutes:
GK	26	(Thailand) Yodsapon Tiangda
DF	19	(Thailand) Chitipat Tanklang
DF	31	(Thailand) Sirisak Faitong
MF	15	(Thailand) Ekkachai Sumrei
MF	21	(Thailand) Jirawat Makarom		(substituted on) 71'
MF	27	(Montenegro) Đorđije Ćetković	(yellow card) 90+2'	(substituted on) 57'
FW	30	(Cameroon) Frank Acheampong		(substituted on) 82'
Manager:
(Thailand) Attaphol Buspakom

Assistant referees:
Hiroyuki Igarashi (Japan)
Hiroshi Yamauchi (Japan)
Fourth official:
Sumate Saiwaew (Thailand)

MATCH RULES

- 90 minutes.
- 30 minutes of extra-time if necessary.
- Penalty shootout if scores still level.
- Nine named substitutes
- Maximum of 3 substitutions.
