= 2013 Kor Royal Cup =

Muangthong United	Buriram United
0	2
- Date: 23 February 2013
- Venue: Suphachalasai Stadium, Bangkok
- Referee: Kim Sang-Woo (South Korea)

The 2013 Kor Royal Cup was the 78th Kor Royal Cup, an annual football match contested by the winners of the previous season's Thai Premier League and Thai FA Cup competitions. The match was played at Suphachalasai Stadium, Bangkok, on 23 February 2013, and contested by the 2012 Thai Premier League champions Muangthong United, and Buriram United, the winner of the 2012 Thai FA Cup.

== Details ==
23 February 2013
17:00 UTC+7

Muangthong United	0 – 2	Buriram United
		Bustos 4', 82'

Suphachalasai Stadium, Bangkok
Referee: Kim Sang-Woo (South Korea)

Muangthong United	Buriram United

MUANGTHONG UNITED:
GK	28	(Thailand) Weera Koedpudsa
DF	23	(Thailand) Piyaphon Bantao		(substituted off) 77'
DF	40	(South Korea) Kim Yoo-Jin
DF	4	(Thailand) Panupong Wongsa	(yellow card) 28'
DF	18	(Thailand) Mongkol Namnuad	(yellow card) 30' (yellow-red card) 60'
MF	16	(Thailand) Jakkraphan Pornsai		(substituted off) 65'
MF	19	(Thailand) Pichitphong Choeichiu (c)
MF	8	(North Korea) Pak Nam-Chol		(substituted off) 79'
FW	20	(North Macedonia) Mario Gjurovski	(yellow card) 70'
FW	10	(Thailand) Teerasil Dangda	(yellow card) 10'
FW	9	(Austria) Roland Linz
Substitutes:
GK	1	(Thailand) Umarin Yaodam
GK	39	(Thailand) Witsanusak Kaewruang
DF	2	(Thailand) Artit Daosawang	(yellow card) 88'	(substituted on) 65'
DF	5	(North Korea) Ri Kwang-Chon
DF	6	(Thailand) Thritthi Nonsrichai
DF	25	(Thailand) Thitipan Puangchan
DF	35	(Thailand) Weerawut Kayem
MF	7	(Thailand) Datsakorn Thonglao
MF	14	(Thailand) Siwakorn Jakkuprasat		(substituted on) 79'
MF	36	(Thailand) Sarawut Masuk		(substituted on) 77'
FW	13	(Thailand) Chainarong Tathong
FW	29	(Thailand) Napat Thamrongsupakorn
Manager:
(Serbia) Slaviša Jokanović

BURIRAM UNITED:
GK	1	(Thailand) Sivaruck Tedsungnoen
DF	25	(Thailand) Suree Sukha		(substituted off) 81'
DF	3	(Thailand) Pratum Chuthong
DF	5	(Spain) Osmar Ibáñez (c)	(yellow card) 56'
DF	2	(Thailand) Theeraton Bunmathan
MF	17	(Thailand) Anawin Jujeen		(substituted off) 68'
MF	15	(Thailand) Surat Sukha
MF	4	(Thailand) Charyl Chappuis	(yellow card) 22'
MF	19	(Japan) Kai Hirano	(yellow card) 80'
FW	7	(Spain) Carmelo González	(yellow card) 25'	(substituted off) 56'
FW	39	(Chile) Ramsés Bustos	(yellow card) 73'
Substitutes:
GK	26	(Thailand) Yodsapon Tiangda
DF	6	(Thailand) Tanasak Srisai
DF	14	(Thailand) Chitipat Tanklang
DF	33	(Thailand) Adit Pattharaprasit
MF	8	(Thailand) Suchao Nuchnum		(substituted on) 68'
MF	11	(Thailand) Ekkachai Sumrei
MF	13	(Thailand) Jirawat Makarom		(substituted on) 81'
MF	18	(Thailand) Attapong Nooprom
MF	22	(Thailand) Adisak Kraisorn
MF	23	(Thailand) Anthony Ampaipitakwong		(substituted on) 56'
MF	32	(Thailand) Dennis Buschening
FW	16	(Thailand) Suriya Domtaisong
Manager:
(Thailand) Attaphol Buspakom

Assistant referees:
Lee Jung-Min (South Korea)
Seong Mu-Hee (South Korea)
Fourth official:
Chaiya Mahapab

MATCH RULES

- 90 minutes.
- Penalty shoot-out if necessary.
- Maximum of three substitutions.

== See also ==
- 2013 Thai Premier League
- 2013 Thai FA Cup
