= Ekkachai Sumrei =

Thai footballer (born 1988)

Personal information
- Full name: Ekkachai Sumrei
- Date of birth: 28 November 1988 (age 37)
- Place of birth: Satun, Thailand
- Height: 1.73 m (5 ft 8 in)
- Positions: Right back; right winger

Team information
- Current team: Pattani
- Number: 2

Youth career
- 2000–2004: Satun

Senior career*
Years	Team	Apps	(Gls)
2005–2008	Satun	62	(10)
2008–2011	Thai Port	63	(9)
2011–2012	Buriram	12	(6)
2012–2013	Buriram United	30	(10)
2014–2019	Bangkok United	143	(12)
2020–2024	Police Tero	96	(3)
2024–2025	Rayong	13	(0)
2025–	Pattani	30	(4)

International career^{‡}
2010	Thailand U23	1	(0)
2015	Thailand	5	(0)
- * Club domestic league appearances and goals as of 15 March 2026 ‡ National team caps and goals as of 13 May 2023

Ekkachai Sumrei (Thai: เอกชัย สำเร, born 28 November 1988) is a Thai professional footballer who plays as a right back or a right winger for Thai League 2 club Pattani. His goal during the Thai League Week 11 against Bangkok Glass is considered one of the top 5 goals of the round in an article by FOX Sports Asia.

== Club career ==
=== Thai Port ===
Ekkachai was successful playing at Port F.C. He won the 2010 Thai League Cup after defeating Buriram PEA 2–1.

=== Buriram ===
He moved to Buriram in 2011 and won the 2011 Thai Division 1 League with the team.

=== Buriram United ===
Ekkachai later moved to Buriram United in 2012. On 29 May 2013, he scored two goals against Chonburi. On 11 August 2012, he scored a hat-trick against Chainat as Buriram won 7–2.

Ekkachai debuted in the 2013 AFC Champions League against Vegalta Sendai as a substitute. He continued to appear on the bench against Jiangsu Sainty in both legs. On 1 May 2013, he started the match against FC Seoul and scored a goal in the 56th minute. He later scored a header from Jirawat Makarom's free kick against Bunyodkor.

== International career ==
Ekkachai played for Thailand U23 in the 2010 Asian Games in Guangzhou, China. In March 2015 he debuted for Thailand in a friendly match against Singapore. In May 2015, he played for Thailand in the 2018 FIFA World Cup qualification (AFC) against Vietnam.

== Style of play ==
Ekkachai is known for his pace and his dribbling skills.

=== International ===
As of 12 November 2015

National team	Year	Apps	Goals
Thailand	2015	5	0
Thailand	Total	5	0

== Honours ==
=== Clubs ===
Thai Port

- Thai FA Cup (1): 2009
- Thai League Cup (1): 2010

Buriram

- Thai Division 1 League (1): 2011

Buriram United

- Thai League 1 (1): 2013
- Thai FA Cup (2): 2012, 2013
- Thai League Cup (2): 2012, 2013
- Kor Royal Cup (1 : 2013
