= Charyl Chappuis =

Thai footballer (born 1992)

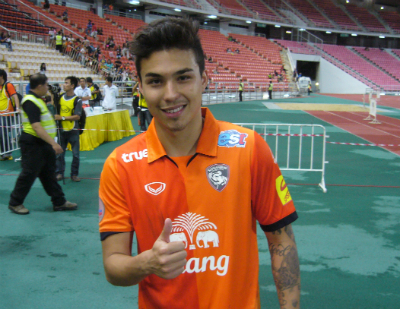
- Chappuis with Suphanburi in 2014

Personal information
- Full name: Charyl Yannis Chappuis
- Date of birth: 12 January 1992 (age 34)
- Place of birth: Kloten, Switzerland
- Height: 1.76 m (5 ft 9 in)
- Position: Midfielder

Youth career
- 1999–2000: FC Kloten
- 2000–2003: SC YF Juventus
- 2003–2009: Grasshoppers

Senior career*
Years	Team	Apps	(Gls)
2009–2011	Grasshoppers II	26	(3)
2010–2012	Grasshoppers	0	(0)
2011–2012	→ Locarno (loan)	26	(2)
2012	→ Lugano (loan)	16	(0)
2013–2014	Buriram United	28	(2)
2014	→ Suphanburi (loan)	17	(2)
2015–2017	Suphanburi	36	(3)
2017–2019	Muangthong United	67	(3)
2020–2024	Port	32	(0)
2023–2024	→ Chiangmai (loan)	27	(0)
2024–2026	Bangkok	36	(6)
Total		311	(21)

International career^{‡}
2006–2007	Switzerland U15	5	(0)
2007–2008	Switzerland U16	8	(0)
2008–2009	Switzerland U17	15	(0)
2009–2010	Switzerland U18	14	(1)
2010–2011	Switzerland U19	6	(0)
2011	Switzerland U20	2	(0)
2013–2014	Thailand U23	14	(4)
2014–2017	Thailand	21	(4)
Medal record
Representing Switzerland
FIFA U-17 World Cup
Winner	2009 Nigeria
Representing Thailand
Sea Games
Gold medal – first place	2013 Myanmar
Asean Football Championship
Winner	2014 Singapore & Vietnam
Winner	2016 Myanmar & Philippines
- * Club domestic league appearances and goals as of 03:38, 27 May 2026 (UTC) ‡ National team caps and goals as of 23 March 2017

Charyl Yannis Chappuis (Thai: ชาริล ยานนิส ชัปปุยส์; born 12 January 1992) is a former professional footballer who plays as a midfielder. Born in Switzerland, he has represented the Thailand national team.

== Early career ==
Chappuis began his playing career with hometown club FC Kloten but soon moved on to SC YF Juventus, spending some time in their youth ranks. He was on the move again though as Swiss Super League side Grasshopper Club snapped up the promising midfielder in July 2003.

== Club career ==
=== Grasshoppers ===
Chappuis moved up through Grasshopper's youth system, soon playing regularly for the reserves but not being able to break into the first team though he was named in match day squads several times as he began training with the senior team.

=== Locarno and Lugano loans ===
In order to get some first team experience he went on loan to FC Locarno for the 2011–2012 season. He made his debut for Locarno on 25 July 2011 against FC Wohlen and scored the first goal of his loan spell in a 2–1 away win versus FC Wil on 20 November 2011. Chappuis returned to Grasshopper at the end of the term and was immediately loan out again, this time to FC Lugano for the duration of the 2012–2013 season. He made his debut for Lugano on 14 July 2012 against FC Wil in a 3–1 victory.

=== Buriram United ===
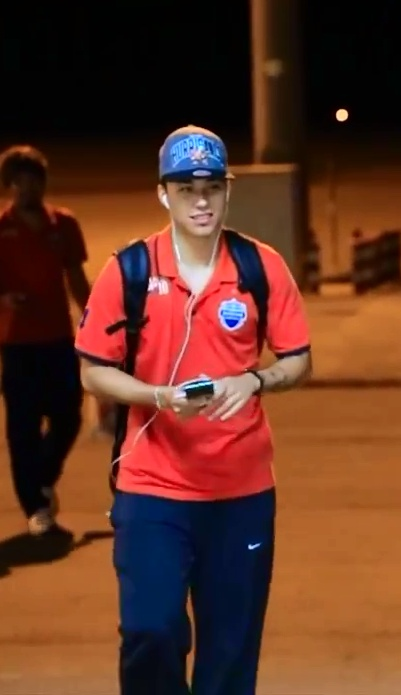
Chappuis in 2013

In 2013, Chappuis moved to Thailand to join Buriram United. He scored his first Buriram goal against Suphanburi FC, he scored by curling a corner into the second post. He also scored a goal in the 2013 AFC Champions League against Jiangsu Sainty, but twisted his knee and was ruled out for three months while celebrating the goal. Chappuis scored his second goal against Chainat FC on 8 September 2013.

=== Suphanburi ===
After spent the second leg of 2014 season at Suphanburi by the loan contract from Buriram, Chappuis joined Suphanburi F.C. for the 2015 season, joining the likes of Jakkaphan Pornsai along with his former Buriram teammates Carmelo Gonzalez and Pratum Chuthong.

Chappuis missed the whole 2015 season however with a knee injury that required surgery. He also missed the 2015 SEA Games Tournament.

After missing nearly 16 months out injured, Chappuis finally made his return in a 3–1 win in a friendly match against Simork. Chappuis made his league return on 8 May 2016 coming on as a substitute in the 80th minute for goalscorer Carmelo in a 1–0 win over Army United.

== International career ==
Chappuis was a Swiss youth international. In 2009, he was part of the Swiss under-17 team that won the 2009 FIFA U-17 World Cup that defeated the host nation Nigeria 1–0 in the final, featuring in all seven matches at the tournament.

Chappuis was called up by Thailand's ex-coach Winfried Schäfer to play against Lebanon for the 2015 AFC Asian Cup qualification phase.

He was called up to the Thailand U23 team by coach Kiatisuk Senamuang to compete in the 2013 Southeast Asian Games. His unofficial debut] was a friendly match against FC Barcelona, during FC Barcelona's tour in Bangkok. Chappuis made his official debut against Uganda in November 2013.

Chappuis won a gold medal at the 2013 Southeast Asian Games with Thailand.

He represented Thailand at the 2014 Asian Games. Chappuis was also part of the senior squad that won the 2014 AFF Suzuki Cup. In Thailand's first game, Chappuis scored a last-minute penalty against Singapore to seal a 2–1 win over the hosts. He also found the net in the next game as Thailand came from behind to beat Malaysia 3–2. Chappuis had a disappointing semi-final but in the first leg of the final, he scored another penalty in a 2–0 win over Malaysia. In the second leg of the final, Thailand lost 3-2 but still won overall with Chappuis finding the net yet again after the Malaysian goalkeeper parried Sarach Yooyen's free kick into his path.

In August 2016, after a 20-month absence from the national team due to injury, Chappuis was recalled to the national team for the 2018 FIFA World Cup qualification phase in September 2016.

== Personal life ==
Chappuis grew up in Kloten, Switzerland, as the son of a Swiss father and a Thai mother. He speaks German, English and French fluently, and he has become more fluent in Thai.

Chappuis's favorite football team is Barcelona and his dream league to play in would be the Bundesliga. His Instagram has gathered more than one million followers in 2018.

Chappuis began dating Helena Busch, a Thai model, in December 2017. Chappuis announced their engagement on 14 February 2021, after three years of dating.

On 12 April 2021, it was announced that Chappuis tested positive for COVID-19, while being asymptomatic, amid its pandemic in Thailand. He became the first player in the Thai League to have tested positive for COVID-19.

== Statistics ==
As of match played 27 April 2024

Appearances and goals by club, season and competition
Club	Season	League			Cup		League Cup		Continental		Other		Total	
Club	Season	Division	Apps	Goals	Apps	Goals	Apps	Goals	Apps	Goals	Apps	Goals	Apps	Goals
Grasshopper	2010–11	Swiss Super League	0	0	1	0	—		—		—		1	0
FC Locarno	2011–12	Swiss Challenge League	26	2	2	0	—		—		—		28	2
FC Lugano	2012–13	Swiss Challenge League	16	0	1	0	—		—		—		17	0
Buriram United	2013	Thai Premier League	16	2	2	0	2	1	6	1	1	0	27	4
Buriram United	2014	Thai Premier League	12	0	—		3	0	5	0	1	0	21	0
Buriram United	Total		28	2	2	0	5	1	11	1	2	0	48	4
Suphanburi	2014	Thai Premier League	17	2	3	0	—		—		—		20	2
Suphanburi	2015	Thai Premier League	0	0	0	0	0	0	—		—		0	0
Suphanburi	2016	Thai Premier League	21	3	4	0	0	0	—		—		25	3
Suphanburi	2017	Thai Premier League	15	0	—		—		—		—		15	0
Suphanburi	Total		53	5	7	0	0	0	—		—		60	5
Muangthong United	2017	Thai League 1	13	0	3	1	3	0	—		—		19	1
Muangthong United	2018	Thai League 1	31	3	2	0	2	0	2	0	—		37	3
Muangthong United	2019	Thai League 1	23	0	3	0	0	0	—		—		26	0
Muangthong United	Total		67	3	8	1	5	0	2	0	—		82	4
Port	2020–21	Thai League 1	12	0	3	1	—		4	1	—		19	2
Port	2021–22	Thai League 1	8	0	1	0	1	0	—		—		10	0
Port	2022–23	Thai League 1	12	0	2	0	1	0	—		—		15	0
Port	Total		32	0	6	1	2	0	4	1	—		44	2
Chiangmai	2023–24	Thai League 2	25	0	0	0	—		—		2	0	27	0
Total			247	12	27	2	12	1	17	2	2	0	307	17

=== International ===
As of 5 October 2017

National team	Year	Apps	Goals
Thailand	2014	8	4
Thailand	2015	0	0
Thailand	2016	10	0
Thailand	2017	3	0
Total		21	4

==== Thailand ====
No	Date	Venue	Opponent	Score	Result	Competition
—	25 May 2014	Rajamangala Stadium, Bangkok, Thailand	Kuwait	1–1	1–1	Friendly (Unofficial match)
1.	23 November 2014	Singapore Sports Hub, Kallang, Singapore	Singapore	2–1	2–1	2014 AFF Championship
2.	26 November 2014	Jalan Besar Stadium, Kallang, Singapore	Malaysia	2–2	3–2	2014 AFF Championship
3.	17 December 2014	Rajamangala Stadium, Bangkok, Thailand	Malaysia	1–0	2–0	2014 AFF Championship
4.	20 December 2014	Bukit Jalil National Stadium, Kuala Lumpur, Malaysia	Malaysia	1-3	2–3	2014 AFF Championship

== Honours ==
=== Club ===
Buriram United

- Thai Premier League (1): 2013
- Thai FA Cup (1): 2013
- Thai League Cup (1): 2013
- Kor Royal Cup (2): 2013, 2014

Muangthong United

- Thai League Cup (1): 2017
- Mekong Club Championship (1): 2017

=== International ===
Switzerland U-17

- FIFA U-17 World Cup (1): 2009

Thailand U-23

- Sea Games Gold Medal (1): 2013

Thailand

- AFF Championship (2): 2014, 2016

=== Individual ===
- AFF Championship Best XI: 2014

== Royal decoration ==
- 2015 - Silver Medalist (Seventh Class) of The Most Admirable Order of the Direkgunabhorn
