= Jirawat Makarom =

Thai footballer

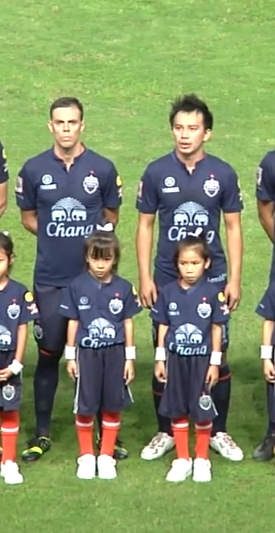
- Jirawat (right) with Carmelo González (left) in 2013

Personal information
- Full name: Jirawat Makarom
- Date of birth: 7 February 1986 (age 40)
- Place of birth: Khon Kaen, Thailand
- Height: 1.73 m (5 ft 8 in)
- Position: Midfielder

Senior career*
Years	Team	Apps	(Gls)
2007–2011	Thai Port	84	(21)
2011	Buriram	15	(8)
2012–2014	Buriram United	51	(5)
2014–2015	BEC Tero Sasana	12	(2)
2015–2016	Port	15	(1)
2016	→ Sisaket (loan)	13	(1)
2016–2017	Lampang	29	(2)
2017–2018	Air Force Central	39	(2)
2019	Khon Kaen United	22	(0)
Total		270	(42)

International career
2012	Thailand	2	(0)
- * Club domestic league appearances and goals

Jirawat Makarom (Thai: จิรวัฒน์ มัครมย์; born February 7, 1986) is a Thai retired professional footballer who played as a midfielder.

== Club career ==
=== Thai Port ===
Jirawat has established himself as a regular member of the Thai Port FC midfield in the 2009 season. He has earned a reputation as a free kick specialist with 6 of his 7 goals from set plays in the 2009 season. He was named man of the match in the 2009 Thai FA Cup Final, and was also given the 2009 Most promising player award by Thai Port FC. He played and scored a goal in the 2010 Thai League Cup final and won a winner's medal after Thai Port defeated Buriram PEA F.C. 2–1.

=== Buriram FC ===
Jirawat joined Buriram FC in 2011 and won the 2011 Thai Division 1 League with the team.

=== Buriram United ===
He joined Buriram PEA F.C. (currently Buriram United) in 2012. In the 2012 AFC Champions League he scored his debut goal for Buriram PEA F.C. against Kashiwa Reysol.

Jirawat played in the 2013 AFC Champions League with Buriram United. His corner assisted Osmar in the 2013 AFC Champions League against Esteghlal, and his free kick that assisted Ekkachai Sumrei against Bunyodkor. Jirawat scored against Bangkok United FC in October which secured Buriram United's 2013 Thai Premier League title.

== International career ==
Jirawat debuted for the national team in the 2012 King's Cup. He came in as a substitute in an unofficial debut against South Korea in the 2012 King's Cup. He came in as a substitute for Sumanya Purisai, in an official debut against Norway. On February 29, 2012, Jirawat started for Thailand against Oman in the 2014 World Cup qualification.

== Style of Play ==
Jirawat is known for his deadly free kicks and corners which could become goals or allow other players to score. Jirawat's passes are accurate, and had assisted many players. Jirawat could play as a defensive, attacking, or center midfielder.

=== International ===
As of 12 November 2015

National team	Year	Apps	Goals
Thailand	2012	2	0
Thailand	Total	2	0

== Honours ==
=== Club ===
Thai Port

- Thai FA Cup (1): 2009
- Thai League Cup (1): 2010

Buriram

- Thai Division 1 League (1): 2011

Buriram United

- Thai Premier League (1): 2013
- Thai FA Cup (2): 2012, 2013
- Thai League Cup (2): 2012, 2013
- Kor Royal Cup (2): 2013, 2014
