= Siwarak Tedsungnoen =

Thai footballer

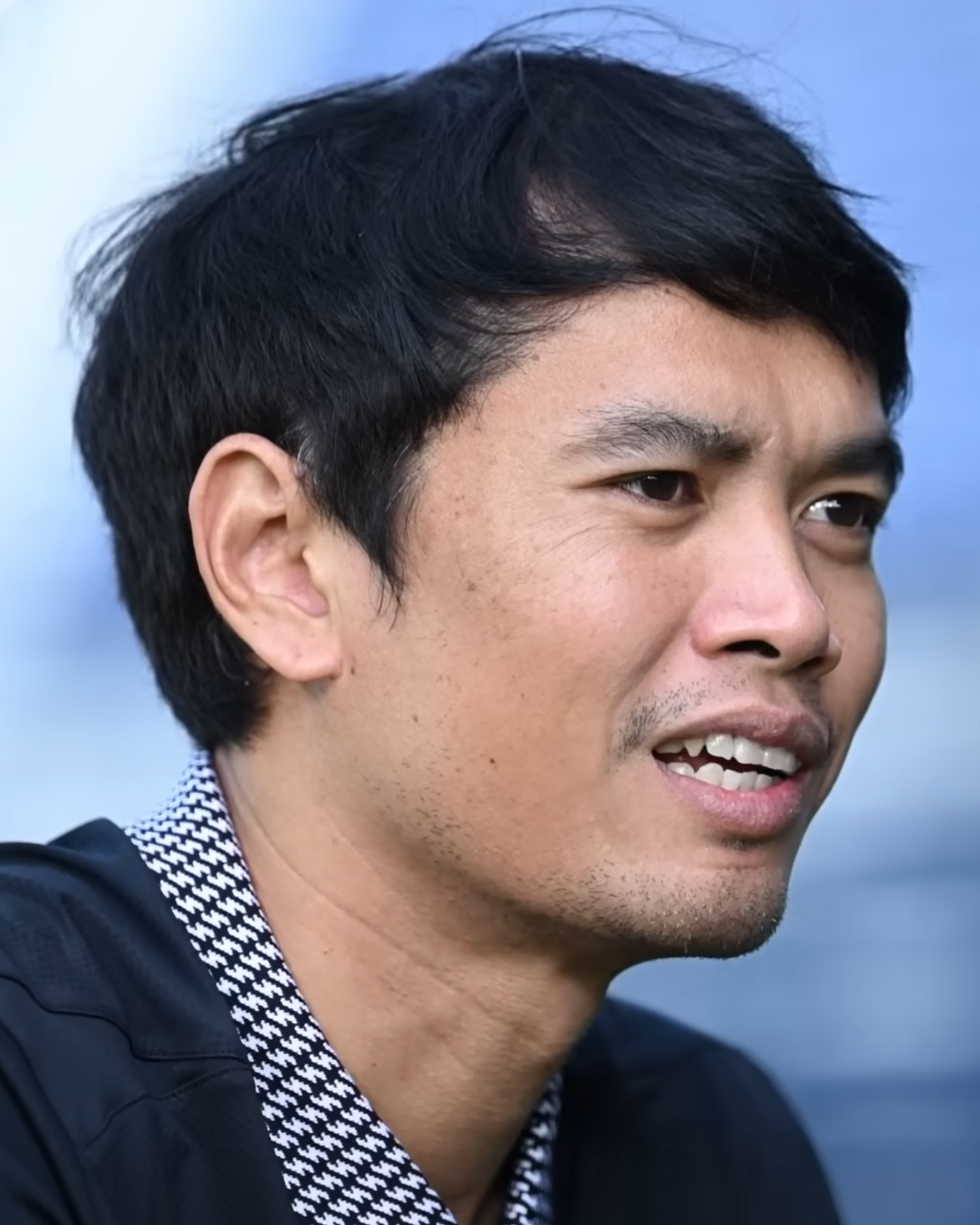
- Siwarak in 2024

Personal information
- Full name: Siwarak Tedsungnoen
- Date of birth: 20 April 1984 (age 42)
- Place of birth: Nakhon Ratchasima, Thailand
- Height: 1.83 m (6 ft 0 in)
- Position: Goalkeeper

Youth career
- 1996–2002: Ratchasima Witthayalai School
- 2002: Nakhon Ratchasima

Senior career*
Years	Team	Apps	(Gls)
2003–2007	Bangkok Bank	76	(0)
2008–2009	BEC Tero Sasana	29	(0)
2010	TOT	0	(0)
2010–2025	Buriram United	439	(0)
Total		544	(0)

International career
2007	Thailand U23	1	(0)
2004–2024	Thailand	33	(0)
Medal record
Thailand under-23
Southeast Asian Games
Gold medal – first place	Sea Games 2007	Football
Thailand
Asean Football Championship
Winner	AFF Suzuki Cup 2020	2020
- * Club domestic league appearances and goals

Siwarak Tedsungnoen (Thai: ศิวรักษ์ เทศสูงเนิน, RTGS: Siwarak Thetsungnoen; born April 20, 1984) is a Thai retired professional footballer who played as a goalkeeper.

== Club career ==
=== Bangkok Bank ===
Siwarak played for Bangkok Bank FC from 2003 to 2007, making 76 caps.

=== BEC Tero Sasana ===
Siwarak moved to BEC Tero Sasana FC in 2008. Although Siwarak played well in BEC Tero Sasana F.C. he was not always a starter, because Pisan Dorkmaikaew another goalkeeper in BEC Tero also played well. Therefore, the competition in the team is high, and being a starter is not guaranteed.

=== TOT ===
Siwarak moved to TOT S.C. in 2010, but didn't play any match for the team.

=== Buriram United ===
==== 2010 Season ====
In 2010 Siwarak moved to Buriram PEA (currently Buriram United). He was Buriram United's best keeper and he became a regular starter for Buriram United.

==== 2011 Season ====
Siwarak made history with Buriram after winning the 2011 Thai Premier League, 2011 Thai FA Cup, and the 2011 Thai League Cup.

==== 2012 Season ====
Siwarak played in the 2012 AFC Champions League with Buriram United. Although this year he didn't win the Thai Premier League with Buriram, he won the Thai FA Cup and the Thai League Cup.

==== 2013 Season ====
Siwarak played in the 2013 AFC Champions League playoffs against Brisbane Roar FC, from his team's Thai FA Cup win. Siwarak's form in the 2013 AFC Champions League playoffs was extraordinary, after getting a clean sheet and saving three penalties in a row from players from Brisbane Roar FC.

Buriram United qualified to 2013 AFC Champions League after winning Brisbane Roar FC in the penalty shootouts. After that Siwarak became number five of Asia in saving the most penalties. He played every game for Buriram United in the 2013 AFC Champions League. Siwarak also played every game for Buriram United in the 2013 Thai Premier League, he conceded 23 goals and got 13 clean sheets.

== International career ==
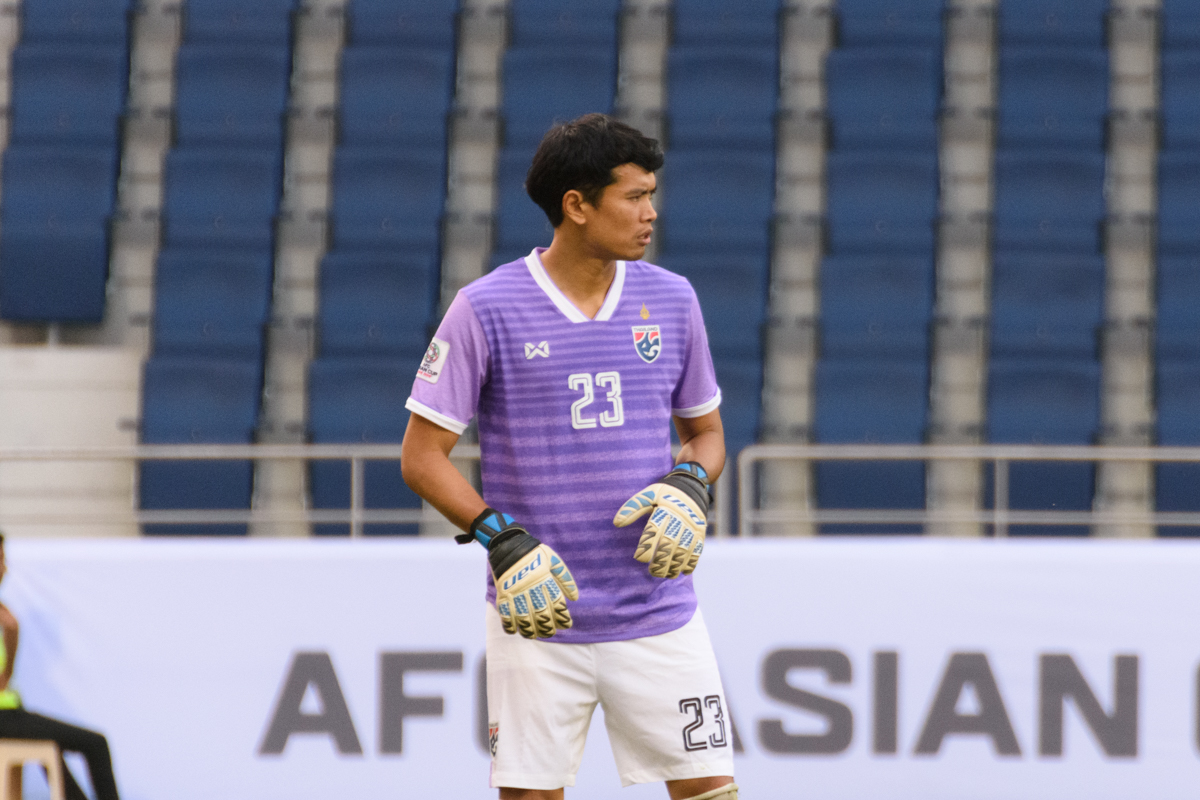
Siwarak playing for Thailand at the 2019 AFC Asian Cup

Siwarak played for Thailand U-23 in the 2007 Southeast Asian Games, and won a gold medal. He played his 7th game for Thailand against Oman in the Asian World Cup Qualifying section in 2008, but after Thailand hired a new national team coach, he found himself left out of any squad call ups, missing out on the 2008 AFF Suzuki Cup. Siwarak was recalled to the national team for the 2009 King's Cup. In 2013 Siwarak played against Lebanon in the 2015 AFC Asian Cup qualification, after the first choice keeper Kawin Thamsatchanan got injured. In 2018 he was called up by Thailand national team for the 2018 AFF Suzuki Cup.

Siwarak was named for the final squad in 2019 AFC Asian Cup, but initially only acted as third-choice behind regular Chatchai Budprom under Milovan Rajevac. However, after Chatchai's disastrous performance in the team's shocking 1–4 defeat to India, he was chosen as the team's custodian replacing Chatchai as Rajevac was fired.

Siwarak performance in later matches against Bahrain (1–0), UAE (1–1) and China (1–2) earned him praise and reputation, in which he was accredited as an instrumental part for Thailand's return to the knockout stage since 1972.

Siwarak was named captain by new coach Akira Nishino for 2022 FIFA World Cup qualification.

== Honours ==
Buriram United

- Thai League 1 (10): 2011, 2013, 2014, 2015, 2017, 2018, 2021–22, 2022–23, 2023–24, 2024–25
- Thai FA Cup (7): 2011, 2012, 2013, 2015, 2021–22, 2022–23, 2024–25
- Thai League Cup (8): 2011, 2012, 2013, 2015, 2016, 2021–22, 2022–23, 2024–25
- Thailand Champions Cup (1): 2019
- Kor Royal Cup (4): 2013, 2014, 2015, 2016
- Mekong Club Championship (2): 2015, 2016
- ASEAN Club Championship (1): 2024–25

Thailand

- AFF Championship (1): 2020
- King's Cup (1): 2017

Thailand U-23

- Sea Games gold medal: 2007
