= Somjet Sattabud =

Thai footballer

Personal information
- Full name: Somjet Sattabud
- Date of birth: 7 July 1981 (age 45)
- Place of birth: Suphan Buri, Thailand
- Height: 1.74 m (5 ft 8 1/2 in)
- Position: Forward

Senior career*
Years	Team	Apps	(Gls)
2000–2010	Rajnavy Rayong	173	(66)
2010	Chainat	16	(4)
2011	Buriram PEA	4	(2)
2011–2012	Buriram	29	(10)
2012	Buriram United	6	(3)
2013–2016	Chainat Hornbill	73	(10)
2017	Kopoon Warrior	3	(0)
Total		304	(95)

International career
2003	Thailand	5	(0)
- * Club domestic league appearances and goals as of 17 August 2015

Somjet Sattabud (Thai: สมเจต สัตบุตร, born July 7, 1981), simply known as Jet (Thai: เจต), is a Thai retired professional footballer who played as a forward.

== International ==
As of 12 November 2015

National team	Year	Apps	Goals
Thailand	2003	5	0
Thailand	Total	5	0

== Honours ==
=== Club ===
Buriram

- Thai Division 1 League (1): 2011

Buriram United

- Thai FA Cup (1): 2012
- Thai League Cup (1): 2012
