= Pratum Chuthong =

Thai footballer

Personal information
- Full name: Pratum Chuthong
- Date of birth: 26 October 1983 (age 43)
- Place of birth: Ranong, Thailand
- Height: 1.75 m (5 ft 9 in)
- Position: Centre-back

Youth career
- 1997–2002: Wat Suthiwararam School
- 2003–2006: Kasem Bundit University

Senior career*
Years	Team	Apps	(Gls)
2007	Kasem Bundit University	15	(0)
2008–2011	Osotspa Saraburi	87	(2)
2012–2014	Buriram United	75	(2)
2015–2016	Suphanburi	26	(6)
2016–2018	Chiangrai United	35	(3)
2018	→ Ratchaburi Mitr Phol (loan)	13	(1)
2019	MOF Customs United	11	(0)
Total		262	(14)

International career
2004–2017	Thailand	20	(0)
Medal record
Thailand
Asean Football Championship
Winner	AFF Suzuki Cup 2016	2016
- * Club domestic league appearances and goals

Pratum Chuthong (Thai: ประทุม ชูทอง, born October 26, 1983) is a Thai retired professional footballer who played as a defender.

== Club career ==
Pratum played for Osotspa Saraburi FC for a long time, and was a regular starter for the team. He later moved to Buriram United in 2012. His form in Buriram is consistent and played regularly. Pratum played in the 2012 AFC Champions League and the 2013 AFC Champions League for Buriram United. At the start of the 2013 Thai Premier League he played a few matches, but later on his form was not the best. Therefore, Tanasak Srisai won Pratum's place as centre back. His form came back in July and he became starter.

== International career ==
Pratum Chuthong was called up to the national team, in coach Winfried Schäfer first squad selection for the 2014 FIFA World Cup qualification. In October, 2013 Pratum was called up to the national team by Surachai Jaturapattarapong to the 2015 AFC Asian Cup qualification. In October, 2013 he played a friendly match against Bahrain. In October 15, 2013 he played against Iran in the 2015 AFC Asian Cup qualification.

In May 2015, he was called up to Thailand to play in the 2018 FIFA World Cup qualification (AFC) against Vietnam.

== Style of Play ==
Although Pratum is not a tall defender, he is stocky and muscular. Pratum could play both right back or left back. He is known for being a tough tackling and being an aggressive defender.

== Honours ==
=== Club ===
Buriram United

- Thai League 1 (2): 2013, 2014
- Thai FA Cup (2): 2012, 2013
- Thai League Cup (2): 2012, 2013
- Kor Royal Cup (2): 2013, 2014

Chiangrai United

- Thai FA Cup (1): 2017

=== International ===
Thailand

- ASEAN Football Championship (1): 2016
