= Adisak Kraisorn =

Thai footballer (born 1991)

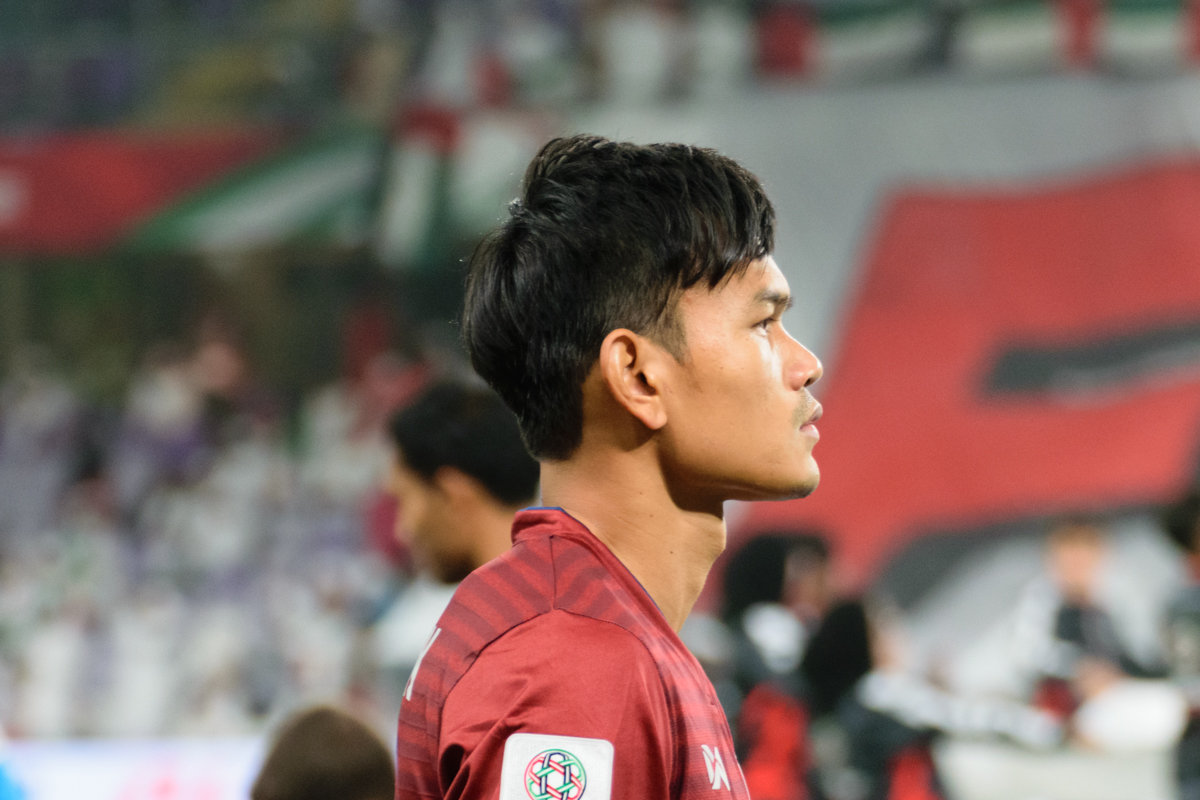
- Adisak with Thailand at the 2019 AFC Asian Cup

Personal information
- Full name: Adisak Kraisorn
- Date of birth: 1 February 1991 (age 35)
- Place of birth: Buriram, Thailand
- Height: 1.82 m (6 ft 0 in)
- Position: Striker

Team information
- Current team: Burapha United

Youth career
- 2004–2006: Suphanburi Sports School
- 2007–2009: Bangkok Christian College
- 2009–2010: Muangthong United

Senior career*
Years	Team	Apps	(Gls)
2010	Muangthong United	0	(0)
2010	→ Phuket (loan)	18	(6)
2011–2014	Buriram United	42	(6)
2015	BEC Tero Sasana	33	(10)
2016–2022	Muangthong United	98	(31)
2020–2021	→ Port (loan)	29	(11)
2022	→ Port (loan)	13	(1)
2023	Terengganu	19	(3)
2024	Bangkok United	11	(1)
2024	Kasetsart	16	(11)
2024–2026	Chonburi	28	(7)
2026–	Burapha United	5	(4)

International career^{‡}
2009–2010	Thailand U19	7	(5)
2011–2014	Thailand U23	7	(5)
2013–2023	Thailand	56	(21)
Medal record
Thailand under-19
AFF U-19 Youth Championship
Winner	AFF U-19 Youth Championship 2009	Football
Thailand under-23
Sea Games
Gold medal – first place	Sea Games 2013	Football
Thailand
Asean Football Championship
Winner	AFF Suzuki Cup 2014	2014
Winner	AFF Suzuki Cup 2020	2020
Winner	AFF Mitsubishi Electric Cup 2022	2022
- * Club domestic league appearances and goals as of 01:13, 24 December 2025 (UTC) ‡ National team caps and goals as of 10 January 2023

Adisak Kraisorn (Thai: อดิศักดิ์ ไกรษร; born 1 February 1991) is a Thai professional footballer who plays as a striker for Thai League 3 club Burapha United.

== Club career ==
He played and scored for Buriram PEA in 2011 and went on to win the League title.

After winning the 2014 Thai Premier League with Buriram United, Adisak moved to BEC Tero Sasana after the two clubs agreed to trade him with Narubodin Weerawatnodom. In 2016 Adisak signed with Muangthong United.

In 2023, Adisak joined Terengganu FC, a Malaysian club in the Malaysia Super League. This was the first time he had played football abroad.

In December 27, 2024 Adisak moved to Chonburi.

== International career ==
He debuted for the U-19 team in the 2010 AFC U-19 Championship.

On July 15, 2013, Adisak debut for Thailand against China in a friendly match. In the following match, Adisak scored two goals for Thailand. He represented Thailand U23 in the 2011 Southeast Asian Games and the 2013 Southeast Asian Games.

On March 6, 2014, he played for Thailand against Lebanon in the 2015 AFC Asian Cup qualification, and scored a goal. He represented Thailand U23 in the 2014 Asian Games. Adisak was part of Thailand's winning squad for the 2014 AFF Suzuki Cup. During the tournament's group stages, Adisak came on as a first-half substitute for Kirati Keawsombat and scored a brace as Thailand came back to win 3-2 against Malaysia. In the first leg of the semi-finals against the Philippines, he also came on as an early substitute for Kirati but he was shown a red card for an off the ball altercation with Amani Aguinaldo, although it seemed the Filipino defender had provoked the incident. Adisak served his one match ban and played in the final were Thailand overcame Malaysia again to claim the Championship.

In May 2015, he played for Thailand in the 2018 FIFA World Cup qualification (AFC) against Vietnam.

He was called up by Alexandré Pölking to play for Thailand at the 2020 AFF Championship and 2022 AFF Championship.

== International goals ==
Scores and results list Thailand's goal tally first.

No.	Date	Venue	Opponent	Score	Result	Competition
1.	15 June 2013	Hefei Olympic Sports Center Stadium, Hefei, China	China	2–0	5–1	Friendly
2.	15 June 2013	Hefei Olympic Sports Center Stadium, Hefei, China	China	3–1	5–1	Friendly
3.	5 March 2014	Rajamangala Stadium, Bangkok, Thailand	Lebanon	2–5	2–5	2015 AFC Asian Cup qualification
4.	18 November 2014	80th Birthday Stadium, Nakhon Ratchasima, Thailand	New Zealand	2–0	2–0	Friendly
5.	26 November 2014	Jalan Besar Stadium, Jalan Besar, Singapore	Malaysia	1–1	3–2	2014 AFF Championship
6.	26 November 2014	Jalan Besar Stadium, Jalan Besar, Singapore	Malaysia	3–2	3–2	2014 AFF Championship
7.	12 November 2015	Rajamangala Stadium, Bangkok, Thailand	Chinese Taipei	3–2	4–2	2018 FIFA World Cup qualification
8.	24 March 2016	Shahid Dastgerdi Stadium, Tehran, Iran	Iraq	2–1	2–2	2018 FIFA World Cup qualification
9.	9 November 2018	Rajamangala Stadium, Bangkok, Thailand	Timor-Leste	1–0	7–0	2018 AFF Championship
10.	9 November 2018	Rajamangala Stadium, Bangkok, Thailand	Timor-Leste	2–0	7–0	2018 AFF Championship
11.	9 November 2018	Rajamangala Stadium, Bangkok, Thailand	Timor-Leste	3–0	7–0	2018 AFF Championship
12.	9 November 2018	Rajamangala Stadium, Bangkok, Thailand	Timor-Leste	4–0	7–0	2018 AFF Championship
13.	9 November 2018	Rajamangala Stadium, Bangkok, Thailand	Timor-Leste	5–0	7–0	2018 AFF Championship
14.	9 November 2018	Rajamangala Stadium, Bangkok, Thailand	Timor-Leste	6–0	7–0	2018 AFF Championship
15.	17 November 2018	Rajamangala Stadium, Bangkok, Thailand	Indonesia	3–1	4–2	2018 AFF Championship
16.	25 November 2018	Rajamangala Stadium, Bangkok, Thailand	Singapore	3–0	3–0	2018 AFF Championship
17.	3 June 2021	Al Maktoum Stadium, Dubai, United Arab Emirates	Indonesia	2–1	2–2	2022 FIFA World Cup qualification
18.	1 January 2022	National Stadium, Kallang, Singapore	Indonesia	1–1	2–2	2020 AFF Championship
19.	27 May 2022	Sri Nakhon Lamduan Stadium, Sisaket, Thailand	Turkmenistan	1–0	1–0	Friendly
20.	26 December 2022	Thammasat Stadium, Pathum Thani, Thailand	Philippines	3–0	4–0	2022 AFF Championship
21.	10 January 2023	Thammasat Stadium, Pathum Thani, Thailand	Malaysia	3–0	3–0	2022 AFF Championship

== Honours ==
=== Club ===
Buriram United

- Thai League 1: 2011, 2013, 2014
- Thai FA Cup: 2011, 2012, 2013
- Thai League Cup: 2011, 2012, 2013
- Kor Royal Cup: 2013, 2014

Muangthong United

- Thai League 1: 2016
- Thai League Cup: 2016, 2017
- Thailand Champions Cup: 2017
- Mekong Club Championship: 2017

Terengganu

- Malaysia Cup runner-up: 2023

Bangkok United

- Thai FA Cup: 2023–24

Chonburi

- Thai League 2: 2024–25

=== International ===
Thailand U-19

- AFF U-19 Youth Championship: 2009

Thailand U-23

- Sea Games gold medal: 2013

Thailand

- AFF Championship: 2014, 2020, 2022
- King's Cup: 2016, 2017

Individual

- AFF Championship top scorer: 2018
