= Anthony Ampaipitakwong =

Thai footballer (born 1988)

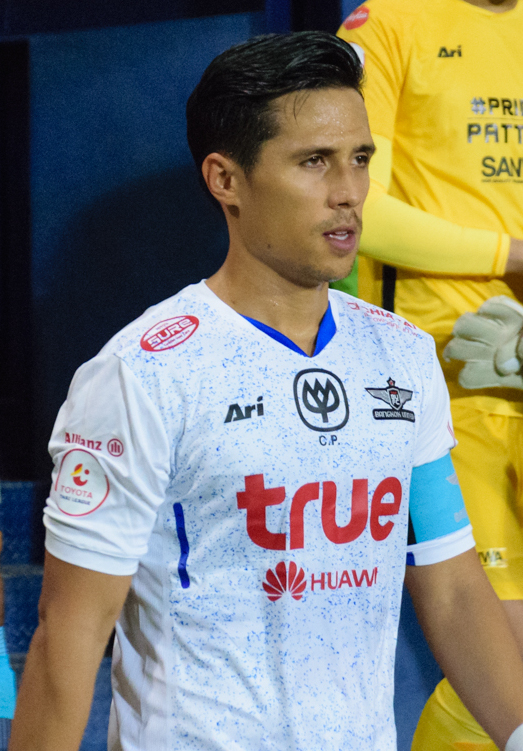
- Ampaipitakwong with Bangkok United in 2018

Personal information
- Full name: Anthony Petch Ampaipitakwong
- Date of birth: 14 June 1988 (age 38)
- Place of birth: Carrollton, Texas, United States
- Height: 1.75 m (5 ft 9 in)
- Position: Defensive midfielder

Youth career
- 2003–2005: IMG Soccer Academy
- 2005–2007: Dallas Texans

College career
Years	Team	Apps	(Gls)
2007–2010	Akron Zips	93	(17)

Senior career*
Years	Team	Apps	(Gls)
2006–2009	Bradenton Academics	45	(6)
2011–2012	San Jose Earthquakes	12	(0)
2012–2013	Buriram United	16	(3)
2013–2021	Bangkok United	179	(6)
Total		252	(15)

International career^{‡}
2004	United States U17	4	(1)
2013	Thailand	2	(0)
- * Club domestic league appearances and goals ‡ National team caps and goals as of March 17, 2013

Anthony Petch Ampaipitakwong (Thai: แอนโธนี่ เพ็ชร อําไพพิทักษ์วงศ์, RTGS: Aenthoni Phet Amphaiphithakwong; born 14 June 1988) is a retired professional footballer who played as a defensive midfielder. Born in the United States, he played for the Thailand national team.

== Personal life ==
Anthony was born in Carrollton, Texas. His mother is American and his father is Thai. From 2003 to 2005, Ampaipitakwong was a part of the United States U-17 national team Residency program in Bradenton, Florida.

== College and amateur ==
While a student at the University of Akron, Ampaipitakwong helped the Akron Zips men's soccer team, coached by Caleb Porter, to their first national championship in 2010 with a win in the College Cup Final against Louisville. He was on the Hermann Trophy Watch List and was a College Soccer News Preseason All-American. He was a co-captain on a team that lost two games over two years. He was a National Soccer Coaches Association of America (NSCAA) First Team All-American and a Soccer America MVP First Team selection in 2009. He was the winner of the NCAA Senior CLASS Award in 2010.

Ampaipitakwong started all 93 games he appeared in over his four-year career at Akron, scoring 17 goals with 30 assists. In his senior season, he scored three goals and had a career high 11 assists.

During his college years Ampaipitakwong also played with the Bradenton Academics in the USL Premier Development League, scoring 6 goals in 45 league appearances over four seasons with the team.

== Club career ==
Ampaipitakwong was selected by the San Jose Earthquakes in the second round of the 2011 MLS SuperDraft (33rd overall). He signed with the club on March 1, 2011, and made his professional debut on March 19 in the first game of the 2011 MLS season, a 1–0 loss to Real Salt Lake. In June 2012, Ampaipitakwong signed a 2.5 year contract with Thai Premier League side Buriram United. In the second leg of the 2013 Thai Premier League Ampaipitakwong was bought from Buriram United by Bangkok United and signed a 2.5 year deal.

On 19 March 2022, Ampaipitakwong came to watch the Thai League game, where Bangkok United beat Chiangrai United 3–0 before bid farewell to teammates and club fans after deciding to officially retired from professional footballer and will travel back to his hometown in Carrollton, Texas, USA.

== International career ==
Ampaipitakwong represented the United States under-17 national team.

He represented the Thailand national football team, as his father is Thai. He played his first match with the Thai national team in the match against Qatar on March 17, 2013.

== Statistics ==
As of 3 April 2021

Club	Season	League		Cup		League Cup		Continental		Total	
Club	Season	Apps	Goals	Apps	Goals	Apps	Goals	Apps	Goals	Apps	Goals
San Jose Earthquakes	2011	12	0	2	0	—		—		14	0
San Jose Earthquakes	2012	0	0	0	0	—		—		0	0
San Jose Earthquakes	Total	12	0	2	0	—		—		14	0
Buriram United	2012	10	3	5	0	6	1	—		21	4
Buriram United	2013	6	0	0	0	0	0	1	0	7	0
Buriram United	Total	16	3	5	0	6	1	1	0	28	4
Bangkok United	2013	11	2	1	0	—		—		12	2
Bangkok United	2014	24	1	2	0	0	0	—		25	1
Bangkok United	2015	25	2	1	0	2	1	—		27	3
Bangkok United	2016	25	0	1	0	0	0	—		26	0
Bangkok United	2017	30	0	4	0	0	0	1	0	35	0
Bangkok United	2018	30	0	1	0	0	0	—		31	0
Bangkok United	2019	19	0	2	0	1	0	1	0	23	0
Bangkok United	2020	16	0	4	0	0	0	—		20	0
Bangkok United	Total	180	5	16	0	3	1	2	0	201	6
Career Total		208	8	23	0	9	2	3	0	243	10

=== International ===
As of November 12, 2015

National team	Year	Apps	Goals
Thailand	2013	2	0
Thailand	Total	2	0

== Honors ==
=== University of Akron ===
- NCAA Men's Division I Soccer Championship (1): 2010

=== Buriram United ===
- Thai FA Cup (1): 2012
- Thai League Cup (1): 2012
- Kor Royal Cup (1): 2013
