= 2014 Kor Royal Cup =

Buriram United	Muangthong United
1	0
- Date: 1 February 2014
- Venue: Suphanburi Stadium, Suphanburi
- Referee: Siwakorn Pu-Udom

The 2014 Kor Royal Cup was the 79th Kor Royal Cup, an annual football match contested by the winners of the previous season's Thai Premier League and Thai FA Cup competitions. The match was played at Suphanburi Stadium, Suphanburi and contested by 2013 Thai Premier League champions Buriram United, and 2013 Thai Premier League runners-up Muangthong United, as Buriram also won the 2013 Thai FA Cup. On January 21, with less than two week before the start of the tournament, the 2014 Kor Royal Cup were moved from the capital Bangkok to Suphanburi because the 2013–14 Thai political crisis .

== Details ==
1 February 2014
17:30 UTC+7

Buriram United	1 – 0	Muangthong United
Simpson 79'

Suphanburi Stadium, Suphanburi
Referee: Sivakorn Pu-Udom

BURIRAM UNITED	MUANGTHONG UNITED

BURIRAM UNITED:
GK	1	(Thailand) Sivaruck Tedsungnoen
RB	25	(Thailand) Suree Sukha
CB	3	(Thailand) Pratum Chuthong
CB	5	(Spain) David Rochela
LB	2	(Thailand) Theeraton Bunmathan
CM	10	(Thailand) Jakkraphan Kaewprom	(yellow card) 88'
CM	8	(Thailand) Suchao Nuchnum (c)		(substituted off) 90+1'
RM	17	(Thailand) Anawin Jujeen
LM	24	(Japan) Kai Hirano		(substituted off) 71'
FW	7	(Spain) Carmelo González
FW	18	(Argentina) Leandro Torres		(substituted off) 65'
Substitutes:
GK	26	(Thailand) Yodsapon Tiangda
MF	4	(Thailand) Charyl Chappuis		(substituted in) 90+1'
MF	13	(Thailand) Jirawat Makarom	(yellow card) 85'	(substituted in) 71'
MF	15	(Thailand) Surat Sukha
FW	23	(England) Jay Simpson	(yellow card) 77'	(substituted in) 65'
FW	32	(Thailand) Kittiphong Pluemjai
Manager:
(Spain) Alejandro Menéndez

MUANGTHONG UNITED:
GK	39	(Thailand) Witsanusak Kaewruang
RB	4	(Thailand) Piyaphon Phanichakul	(yellow card) 37'
CB	2	(Thailand) Artit Daosawang
CB	5	(North Korea) Ri Kwang-Chon
LB	28	(Thailand) Suriya Singmui
CM	16	(Thailand) Sarach Yooyen	(yellow card) 35'	(substituted off) 57'
CM	7	(Thailand) Datsakorn Thonglao (c)	(yellow card) 87'
LM	20	(North Macedonia) Mario Gjurovski		(substituted off) 71'
RM	23	(Serbia) Milan Bubalo		(substituted off) 86'
FW	10	(Thailand) Teerasil Dangda
FW	9	(England) Jay Bothroyd
Substitutes:
GK	38	(Thailand) Patiwat Khammai
DF	3	(Thailand) Todsapol Lated
MF	8	(North Korea) Pak Nam-Chol
FW	11	(Thailand) Wuttichai Tathong
FW	13	(Thailand) Chainarong Tathong
FW	17	(Thailand) Chitchanok Xaysensourinthone
MF	19	(Thailand) Anuwat Inyin
MF	22	(Thailand) Pathompol Charoenrattanapirom
MF	24	(Thailand) Kasidech Wettayawong		(substituted in) 70'
MF	25	(Thailand) Thitipan Puangchan		(substituted in) 57'
DF	27	(Thailand) Sarawut Kanlayanabandit
DF	34	(Thailand) Pairote Sokam
DF	35	(Thailand) Weerawut Kayem
MF	36	(Thailand) Sarawut Masuk		(substituted in) 86'
Manager:
(England) Scott Cooper

Assistant referees:
Binla Preeda
Amnad Phongmanee
Fourth official:
Chaiya Mahapab

MATCH RULES

- 90 minutes.
- Penalty shoot-out if necessary.
- Maximum of three substitutions.

== See also ==
- 2014 Thai Premier League
- 2014 Thai Division 1 League
- 2014 Regional League Division 2
- 2014 Thai FA Cup
- 2014 Thai League Cup
- Thai Premier League All-Star Football
