= Na Thawi District Stadium =

Multi-purpose stadium in Thailand

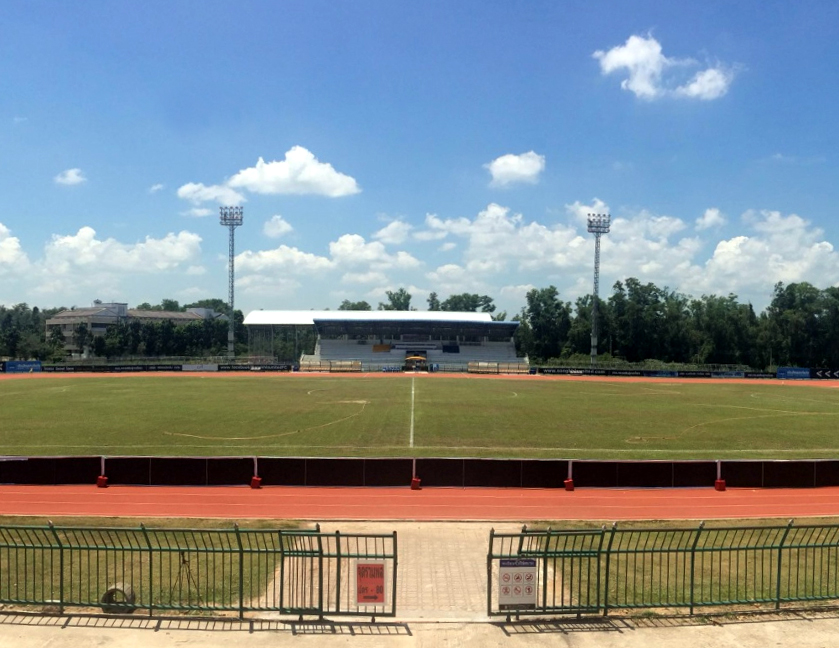
- Interactive map of Na Thawi District Stadium
- Location: Na Thawi, Songkhla, Thailand
- Coordinates: 6°44′00″N 100°41′31″E
- Capacity: 3,000
- Surface: Grass

Tenant
- Songkhla United F.C.

Na Thawi District Stadium (Thai: สนามกีฬากลางอำเภอนาทวี) is a multi-purpose stadium in Na Thawi, Songkhla province, Thailand. It is currently mainly used for football matches and is the home stadium of Songkhla United F.C. The stadium holds 3,000 people.
