= Frank Acheampong =

Ghanaian footballer

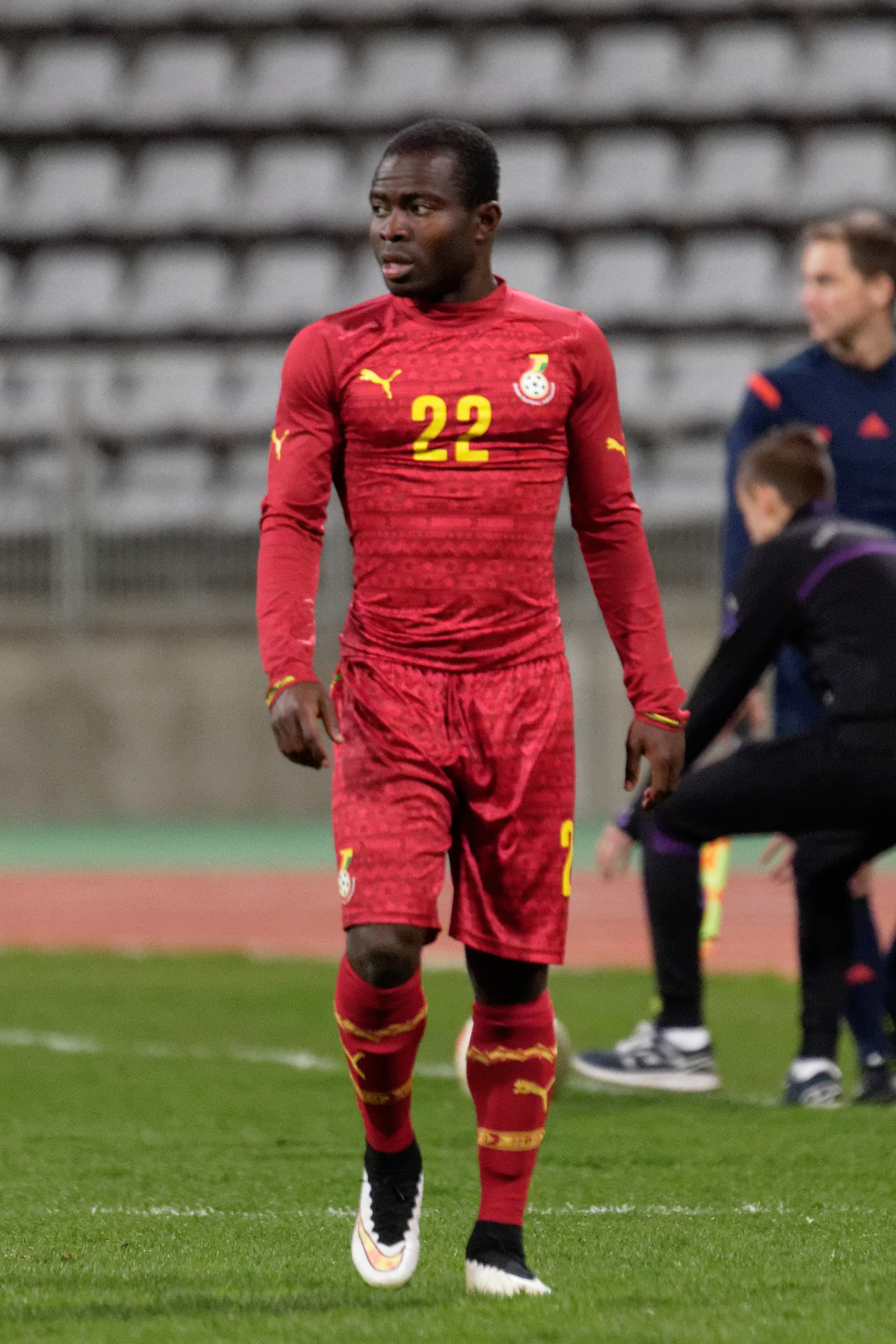
- Acheampong with Ghana in 2015

Personal information
- Full name: Frank Opoku Acheampong
- Date of birth: 16 October 1993 (age 33)
- Place of birth: Asante Mampong, Ghana
- Height: 1.69 m (5 ft 7 in)
- Positions: Forward; wing-back

Team information
- Current team: Dalian Yingbo
- Number: 30

Youth career
- 2009–2010: King Faisal Babes
- 2010–2011: Berekum Chelsea
- 2011: Buriram PEA

Senior career*
Years	Team	Apps	(Gls)
2011–2013	Buriram United	56	(19)
2013	→ Anderlecht (loan)	0	(0)
2013–2017	Anderlecht	116	(13)
2017	→ Tianjin TEDA (loan)	12	(4)
2018–2020	Tianjin TEDA	74	(30)
2021–2023	Shenzhen FC	60	(18)
2024–2025	Henan FC	54	(17)
2026–	Dalian Yingbo	30	(12)

International career
2012–2013	Ghana U20	5	(0)
2012–2018	Ghana	23	(2)
Medal record
Representing Ghana
Men's football
Africa Cup of Nations
Runner-up	2015 Guinea
FIFA U-20 World Cup
Third place	2013 Turkey
- * Club domestic league appearances and goals as of 19 November 2026

Frank Opoku Acheampong (born 16 October 1993) is a Ghanaian professional footballer who plays as a forward for Chinese Super League club Dalian Yingbo.

== Youth career ==
He started his career with Ghanaian side King Faisal Babes, under the direction of Romain Krider, his first coach. He was invited for trials by Sheikh Mansour, who owns the English side Manchester City, to his base in Abu Dhabi, to be observed by Al-Jazira, the other club he owns. In 2010, he was on trial for Croatian club Osijek but he couldn't obtain a work permit.

== Club career ==
=== Buriram United ===
In February 2011, he joined Thai League T1 side Buriram United. After his impressive performance in Thai League T1, Acheampong was invited for a trial with Scottish club Celtic in December 2012. In January 2013, Acheampong moved to Belgian club Anderlecht on a loan spell until the end of the 2012–13 season.

=== Anderlecht ===
On 16 April 2013, Acheampong signed for the Belgian champions Anderlecht for a fee of €1 million. On 28 July, Acheampong made his first appearance for Anderlecht against KSC Lokeren; he came on in the 70th minute in a 3–2 loss. In the 4–1 win over KAA Gent, he came on in the 69th minute and scored his first goal in Belgium. On 17 September Acheampong made his first UEFA Champions League appearance against Benfica; he came on as a substitute in the 46th minute; it ended as a victory for Benfica.

=== Tianjin TEDA ===
On 13 July 2017, Anderlecht announced that Acheampong had joined Chinese Super League side Tianjin TEDA on a six-month loan deal. He made his debut on 22 July 2017. He scored four goals in 12 appearances in the 2017 season which secured Tianjin Teda's stay in the top flight for the next season. On 8 November 2017, Tianjin Teda exercised the option to permanently sign Acheampong.

=== Shenzhen FC ===
On 12 April 2021, Shenzhen FC announced that Acheampong had joined the team on a free transfer, signing a four-year contract. The club was dissolved in January 2024.

=== Henan FC ===
On 9 February 2024, Acheampong joined fellow Chinese Super League club Henan FC. On 12 January 2026, the club announced his departure after the 2025 season.

=== Dalian Yingbo ===
On 24 February 2026, Acheampong joined another Chinese Super League side Dalian Yingbo.

== International career ==
In August 2012, Acheampong was called up to Ghana national team for the international friendly match against China PR in Xi'an. He made his debut in the starting lineup while Ghana drew 1–1 with China on 15 August.

On 23 September 2012, he was made the captain of the Ghana under-20s. In a match against Morocco U20 in 2013 African Youth Championship qualification, he scored twice as the Ghana U20 won the match 4–1.

On 10 September 2013, Acheampong scored his first international goal for Ghana against Japan in a friendly match.

== Personal life ==
He married his girlfriend Momie on 15 December 2019 at Peduase Valley.

== Career statistics ==
=== Club ===
As of match played 8 November 2026

Appearances and goals by club, season and competition
Club	Season	League			National cup (Note: Includes Thai FA Cup, Belgian Cup, Chinese FA Cup)		League cup (Note: Includes Thai League Cup)		Continental		Other		Total	
Club	Season	Division	Apps	Goals	Apps	Goals	Apps	Goals	Apps	Goals	Apps	Goals	Apps	Goals
Buriram United	2011	Thai Premier League	22	7	4	2	7	1	—		—		33	10
Buriram United	2012	Thai Premier League	34	12	2	1	5	1	6 (Note: Appearances in AFC Champions League)	1	1 (Note: Appearances in Kor Royal Cup)	1	48	16
Buriram United	Total		56	19	6	3	12	2	6	1	1	1	81	26
Anderlecht (loan)	2012–13	Belgian Pro League	0	0	0	0	—		0	0	0	0	0	0
Anderlecht	2013–14	Belgian Pro League	24	3	2	1	—		6 (Note: Appearances in UEFA Champions League)	0	0	0	32	4
Anderlecht	2014–15	Belgian Pro League	35	2	4	1	—		8 (Note: Six appearances in UEFA Champions League, two appearances in UEFA Europa League)	0	1 (Note: Appearance in Belgian Super Cup)	0	48	3
Anderlecht	2015–16	Belgian Pro League	28	5	1	0	—		9 (Note: Appearances in UEFA Europa League)	4	—		38	9
Anderlecht	2016–17	Belgian Pro League	29	3	2	0	—		16 (Note: Two appearances in UEFA Champions League, fourteen appearances and three goals in UEFA Europa League)	3	—		47	6
Anderlecht	Total		116	13	9	2	—		39	7	1	0	165	22
Tianjin TEDA (loan)	2017	Chinese Super League	12	4	0	0	—		—		—		12	4
Tianjin TEDA	2018	Chinese Super League	26	17	0	0	—		—		—		26	17
Tianjin TEDA	2019	Chinese Super League	30	9	1	0	—		—		—		31	9
Tianjin TEDA	2020	Chinese Super League	18	4	4	1	—		—		—		22	5
Tianjin TEDA	Total		86	34	5	1	—		—		—		91	35
Shenzhen FC	2021	Chinese Super League	22	5	3	0	—		—		—		25	5
Shenzhen FC	2022	Chinese Super League	24	8	0	0	—		—		—		24	8
Shenzhen FC	2023	Chinese Super League	14	5	0	0	—		—		—		14	5
Shenzhen FC	Total		60	18	3	0	—		—		—		63	18
Henan FC	2024	Chinese Super League	24	3	1	0	—		—		—		25	3
Henan FC	2025	Chinese Super League	30	14	3	1	—		—		—		30	14
Henan FC	Total		54	17	4	1	—		—		—		58	18
Dalian Yingbo	2026	Chinese Super League	30	12	3	0	—		—		—		33	12
Career total			402	113	30	7	12	2	45	8	2	1	491	131

=== International ===
As of match played 30 May 2018

Appearances and goals by national team and year
National team	Year	Apps	Goals
Ghana	2012	1	0
Ghana	2013	1	1
Ghana	2015	6	0
Ghana	2016	6	1
Ghana	2017	7	0
Ghana	2018	2	0
Total		23	2

Scores and results list Ghana's goal tally first, score column indicates score after each Acheampong goal.

No.	Date	Venue	Opponent	Score	Result	Competition
1	10 September 2013	International Stadium Yokohama, Kanagawa, Japan	Japan	1–0	1–3	Friendly
2	24 March 2016	Accra Sports Stadium, Accra, Ghana	Mozambique	1–0	3–1	2017 Africa Cup of Nations qualification

== Honours ==
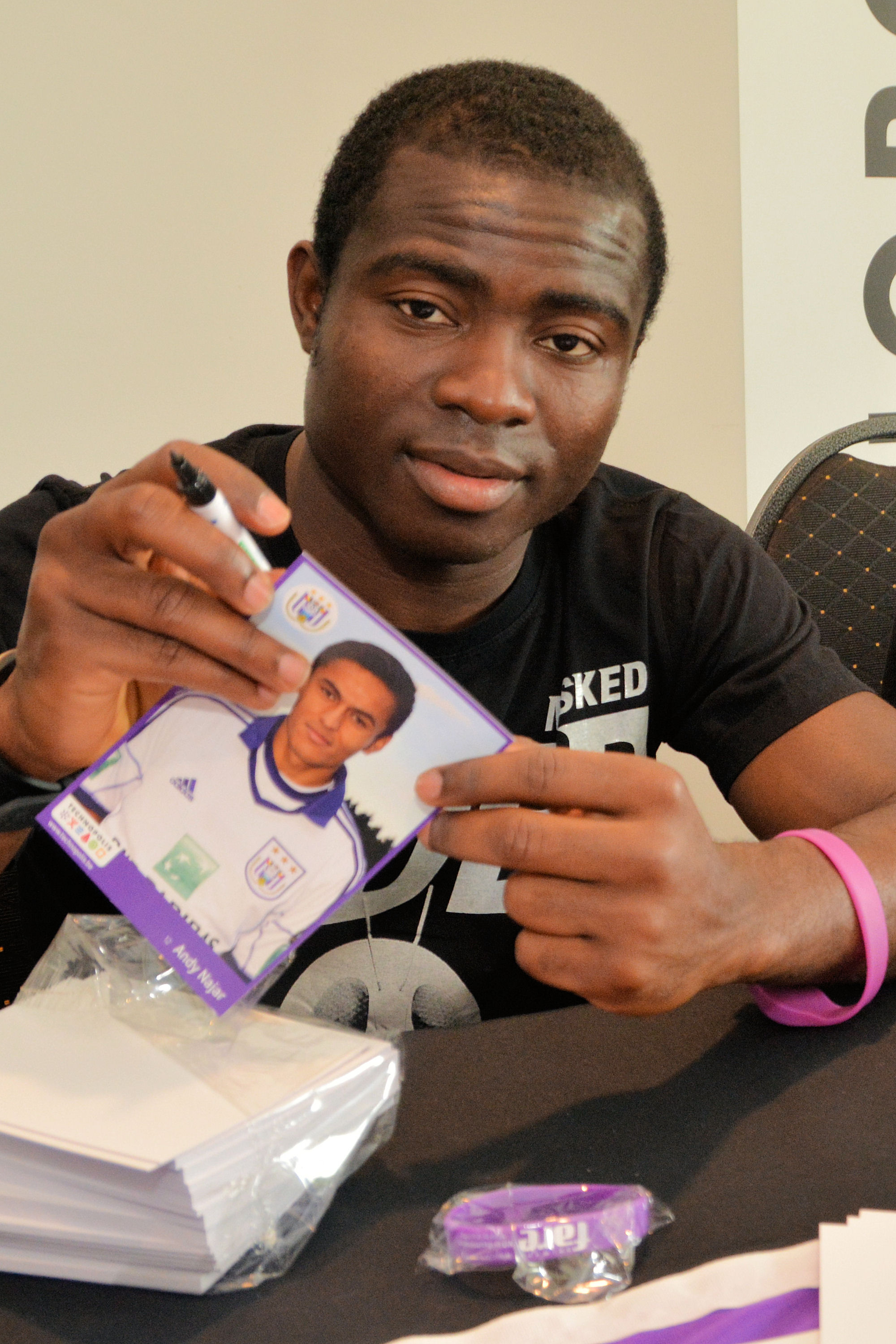
Acheampong in 2014 with Anderlecht

Buriram PEA

- Thai Premier League: 2011
- Thai FA Cup: 2011, 2012
- Thai League Cup: 2011, 2012

RSC Anderlecht

- Belgian Pro League: 2013–14, 2016–17
- Belgian Super Cup: 2013, 2014

Dalian Yingbo

- Chinese Super League: 2026

Ghana U20

- FIFA U-20 World Cup third place: 2013

Ghana

- Africa Cup of Nations runner-up: 2015
