= Kai Hirano =

Japanese footballer

Personal information
- Full name: Kai Hirano
- Date of birth: August 16, 1987 (age 39)
- Place of birth: Okinoshima, Shimane, Japan
- Height: 1.74 m (5 ft 8 1/2 in)
- Position: Midfielder

Youth career
- 2006–2009: Biwako Seikei Sport College

Senior career*
Years	Team	Apps	(Gls)
2010–2012	Kataller Toyama	57	(4)
2012–2014	Buriram United	50	(9)
2014	Cerezo Osaka	7	(1)
2015–2016	→ Army United (loan)	52	(9)
2017	Army United	14	(2)
2017–2018	Lampang		
- * Club domestic league appearances and goals

Kai Hirano (平野 甲斐, Hirano Kai; born August 16, 1987) is a Japanese football player.

== Club career ==
In 2013 Kai Hirano moved from Kataller Toyama to Buriram United in Thai Premier League. In October, he scored his first goal for Buriram United against Ratchaburi FC. In the next game he scored his second goal for Buriram against Pattaya United FC, which was his first home goal.

== Honours ==
Buriram United

- Thai Premier League : 2013
- Thai FA Cup : 2013
- Thai League Cup : 2013
- Kor Royal Cup : 2013, 2014
