= Kriangkrai Ura-ngam =

Thai footballer (born 1993)

Personal information
- Full name: Kriangkrai Ura-ngam
- Date of birth: 21 November 1993 (age 32)
- Place of birth: Surin, Thailand
- Height: 1.68 m (5 ft 6 in)
- Positions: Attacking midfielder; winger

Team information
- Current team: Army United
- Number: 28

Youth career
- 2008: Surin City

Senior career*
Years	Team	Apps	(Gls)
2009–2010	Surin City	29	(4)
2011–2016	Buriram United	5	(0)
2013–2014	→ Surin City (loan)	16	(2)
2015	→ Phichit (loan)	12	(2)
2017	Angthong	17	(1)
2018–	Army United	4	(0)
- * Club domestic league appearances and goals

Kriangkrai Ura-ngam (Thai: เกรียงไกร อุระงาม, born November 21, 1993) is a Thai professional footballer who plays as a midfielder.

== Honours ==
Buriram United

- Thai Premier League Champions : 2011
- Thai FA Cup Champions (2) : 2011, 2012
- Thai League Cup Champions (2) : 2011, 2012
