= Issarapong Lilakorn =

Thai footballer (born 1988)

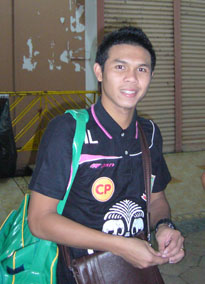

Personal information
- Date of birth: 30 January 1988 (age 38)
- Place of birth: Khon Kaen, Thailand
- Height: 1.72 m (5 ft 7 1/2 in)
- Positions: Striker; attacking midfielder

Youth career
- 2004–2006: Khonkaen

Senior career*
Years	Team	Apps	(Gls)
2007–2009	Khonkaen	61	(18)
2010	Thai Port	8	(1)
2011–2012	Sisaket	5	(0)
2011	→ PTT Rayong (loan)	7	(1)
2012	→ Army United (loan)	34	(5)
2012–2013	Bangkok	19	(4)
2013	BEC Tero Sasana	0	(0)
2013	→ Samut Songkhram (loan)	7	(0)
2014	Samut Songkhram	26	(1)
2015–2016	Khonkaen United	26	(8)
2017–2018	Nongbua Pitchaya	8	(1)
2020	Nakhon Si United	15	(7)

International career^{‡}
2011	Thailand U23	5	(1)
2008	Thailand	2	(0)
- * Club domestic league appearances and goals as of 00:58, 27 December 2020 (UTC) ‡ National team caps and goals as of 5 February 2008

Issarapong Lilakorn (Thai: อิสระพงษ์ ลิละคร) is a Thai retired footballer.

== International career ==
On the back of performing extremely well in the Thailand Division 1 League, Issarapong was called up to the full national side in coach Peter Reid's first squad announcement. He was called up with 35 other players to the 2008 T&T Cup hosted by Vietnam.

Issarapong was a member of the victorious T&T Cup 2008 winning squad.

== Honours ==
- T&T Cup: 2008
