= 2013 Thai League Cup =

Tournament details
- Country: Thailand
- Dates: 2 February 2013 – 24 November 2013
- Teams: 109

Final positions
- Champions: Buriram United (3rd title)
- Runners-up: Ratchaburi Mitphol

Tournament statistics
- Matches played: 114
- Goals scored: 251 (2.2 per match)

Awards
- Best player: Jirawat Makarom

The Thai League Cup is a knock-out football tournament played in Thai sport. Some games are played as a single match, others are played as two-legged contests. The 2013 Thai League Cup kicked off on 2 February 2013 with the Bangkok & field regional qualifiers.

Buriram United were the winners.

== Calendar ==
Round	Date	Matches	Clubs	New entries this round
First Qualifying Round	2,3 February 2013	25	50 → 8 to First Round and 17 to Qualifying Second Round	50 Regional League Division 2
Second Qualifying Round	9,10 February 2013	20	17 + 4 + 19 → 20	23 Regional League Division 2
First Round	23,24 March 2013	32	8 + 20 + 18 + 18 → 32	18 2013 Thai Premier League and 18 2013 Thai Division 1 League
Second Round	8 May 2013	16	32 → 16	
Third Round	5 June 2013	8	16 → 8	
Quarter-finals	10 July 2013	8	8 → 4	
Quarter-finals	31 July 2013	8	8 → 4	
Semi-finals	18 September 2013	4	4 → 2	
Semi-finals	2 October 2013	4	4 → 2	
Final	30 October or 24 November 2013	1	2 → Champions	
Total				109 clubs

== First qualifying round ==
Team 1	Score	Team 2
Northern Region
2 February 2013
Uthai Thani Forest	2 – 0	Nan
Chiangrai	0 – 5	Phitsanulok
3 February 2013
Nakhon Sawan	0 – 1	Phayao
North Eastern Region
2 February 2013
Amnat Charoen Town	1 – 2	Kalasin
Surin	0 – 2	Nong Khai
3 February 2013
Nong Bua Lamphu	1 – 0	Sakon Nakhon
Bangkok & field Region
3 February 2013
Raj-Vithi	1 – 2	RBAC BEC Tero Sasana
Assumption Thonburi	4 – 3	Kasem Bundit University
Customs United	1 – 2	Kasetsart University
Central-West Region
2 February 2013
Ang Thong	3 – 4	Luk Tapfah Pathum Thani
Phetchaburi	1 – 0	Prachuap
Central-East Region
3 February 2013
Chanthaburi	5 – 2	Cha Choeng Sao
Club Rayong	0 – 3	Luk Isan-Thai Air
Samut Sakhon	2 – 3	Rajpracha-BTU
Southern Region
2 February 2013
Pattani	0 – 1	Yala
Ranong	1 – 2	Phattalung

== Second qualifying round ==
Team 1	Score	Team 2
Northern Region
2 February 2013
Phichit	4 – 1	Kamphaeng Phet
3 February 2013
Phetchabun	0 – 1	Phrae United
Lamphun	3 – 0	Uttaradit
North Eastern Region
2 February 2013
Udon Thani	5 – 0	Mahasarakham United
3 February 2013
Roi Et United	2 – 0	Yasothon United

== First round ==
Last 64 teams
Match No.	Match date	Home	Result	Away	Time	Venue	Telecast
1	21 March 2013	Lamphun Warrior F.C.	3-2	Trat F.C.	18:00	Mae Guang Stadium, Lamphun	
2	23 March 2013	Phang Nga F.C.	0-1	Chainat F.C.	17:00	Phang Nga Stadium, Phang Nga	
3	23 March 2013	Phuket F.C.	0-1	PTT Rayong F.C.	18:30	Surakul Stadium, Phuket	
4	23 March 2013	Trang F.C.	1-0	Pattaya United F.C.	18:00	Trang Municipality Stadium, Trang	
5	23 March 2013	Thai Airways-Look Isan F.C.	2-3	Buriram United F.C.	17:00	Thammasart University Stadium, Pathum Thani	SMMTV
6	23 March 2013	Krung Thonburi F.C.	0-1	Muangthong United F.C.	15:30	Mahidol University Sport complex Stadium, Nakohn Pathom	
7	23 March 2013	Maptaphut Rayong F.C.	2-0	Rayong United F.C.	15:30	Maptaphut Municipality Stadium, Rayong	
8	23 March 2013	Nong Bua Lamphu F.C.	1-1; 1-2 AET	Krabi F.C.	16:00	Nong Bua Lamphu Stadium, Nong Bua Lamphu	
9	23 March 2013	Phichit F.C.	2-2; 7-5 PEN	Bangkok F.C.	18:00	Pichit PAO Stadium, Pichit	
10	23 March 2013	Air Force AVIA F.C.	1-1; 4-1 AET	Osotspa Saraburi F.C.	18:00	Thupatemee Stadium, Pathum Thani	
11	23 March 2013	Phattalung F.C.	1-4	Rayong F.C.	18:00	Patthalung Stadium, Patthalung	
12	23 March 2013	RBAC BEC Tero Sasana F.C.	1-2	BBCU F.C.	15:30	RBAC Stadium, Bangkok	
13	23 March 2013	Prachinburi United F.C.	0-2	Ratchaburi F.C.	15:30	Prachinburi Stadium, Prachinburi	
14	23 March 2013	Hua Hin City F.C.	1-3	Samut Songkhram F.C.	16:00	Thanaratchata Camp Football Field, Prachuap Khiri Khan	
15	23 March 2013	Raj Pracha Thailand F.C.	0-4	Chonburi F.C.	18:00	SCG Stadium, Nonthaburi	
16	23 March 2013	Phrae United F.C.	0-0; 5-4 PEN	Bangkok Glass F.C.	18:00	Phrae PAO Stadium, Phrae	SiamSport TV True Visions 69
17	23 March 2013	Phetchaburi F.C.	1-2	Chiangrai United F.C.	15:30	Tha Yang Municipality Stadium, Petchaburi	
18	23 March 2013	Lampang F.C.	1-1; 4-5 PEN	Nakhon Pathom United F.C.	18:00	Lampang Stadium (Nong Krating), Lampang	
19	24 March 2013	Kasetsart University F.C.	0-6	Police United F.C.	15:30	Inseechandrasathittaya Football Field, Nakhon Pathom	
20	24 March 2013	Udon Thani F.C.	2-0	Singhtarua F.C.	16:00	Udon Thani IPE Stadium, Udon Thani	
21	24 March 2013	Roi Et United F.C.	0-2	Siam Navy F.C.	18:00	Roi Et Stadium, Roi Et	
22	24 March 2013	Assumption College Thonburi F.C.	0-2	Army United F.C.	16:00	Assumption Thonburi Ground, Bangkok	
23	24 March 2013	Samut Prakan United F.C.	0-0; 2-3 PEN	Songkhla United F.C.	15:30	SPUTD Stadium, Samut Prakan	SMMTV
24	24 March 2013	Uthai Thani F.C.	1-2	Khonkaen F.C.	17:00	Uthai Thani Stadium, Uthai Thani	
25	24 March 2013	Phitsanulok F.C.	1-2	Suphanburi F.C.	18:00	Phitsanulok PAO Stadium, Phitsanulok	
26	24 March 2013	Sriracha F.C.	1-1; 5-3 PEN	Sisaket F.C.	18:30	Suzuki Stadium, Chonburi	
27	24 March 2013	Looktabfah F.C.	0-0; 3-2 PEN	TOT S.C.	18:00	Thupatemee Stadium, Pathum Thani	
28	24 March 2013	TTM F.C.	1-4	BEC Tero Sasana F.C.	16:00	His Majesty the King's 60th Birthday Anniversary Stadium, Bangkok	
29	24 March 2013	Royal Thai Fleet F.C.	1-0	Bangkok United F.C.	16:00	Rajnavy Km5 Sattaheep Stadium, Chonburi	
30	24 March 2013	Laem Chabang City F.C.	1-1; 1-2 AET	Nakhon Ratchasima F.C.	15:30	Laem Chabang Stadium, Chonburi	
31	24 March 2013	Kalasin F.C.	1-1; 6-5 PEN	Ayutthaya F.C.	17:30	Kalasin Municipality Stadium, Kalasin	
32		Nong Khai F.C.	Bye				

== Second round ==
Last 32 teams
Match No.	Match date	Home	Result	Away	Time	Venue	Telecast
1	1 May 2013	Phrae United F.C.	0-2	Air Force AVIA F.C.	18:00	Phrae PAO Stadium, Phrae	
2	8 May 2013	Siam Navy F.C.	2-1	Suphanburi F.C.	18:30	Sattahip Navy Stadium, Rayong	SMMTV
3	8 May 2013	Lamphun Warrior F.C.	0-1	Ratchaburi F.C.	18:00	Ratchaburi Stadium, Ratchaburi	
4	8 May 2013	Looktabfah F.C.	2-2; 7-5 PEN	Chainat F.C.	16:00	Thupathemi Stadium, Pathum Thani	
5	8 May 2013	Krabi F.C.	1-2	PTT Rayong F.C.	18:00	Krabi Stadium, Krabi	
6	8 May 2013	Nakhon Ratchasima F.C.	2-1	Nakhon Pathom United F.C.	18:30	80th Birthday Stadium, Nakhon Ratchasima	
7	8 May 2013	Khonkaen F.C.	1-1; 2-2 AET; 5-3 PEN	BEC Tero Sasana F.C.	18:00	Khon Kaen Stadium, Khonkaen	
8	8 May 2013	Nong Khai F.C.	1-4	Police United F.C.	17:00	Nong Khai Stadium, Nong Khai	
9	8 May 2013	BBCU F.C.	0-0; 0-1 AET	Army United F.C.	18:00	Rajamangala Stadium, Bangkok	FootballSiam TV True Visions 114
10	8 May 2013	Trang F.C.	0-1	Chonburi F.C.	18:00	Trang Stadium, Trang	
11	15 May 2013	Udon Thani F.C.	1-1; 2-1 AET	Samut Songkhram F.C.	18:00	Udon Thani Stadium, Udon Thani	
12	8 May 2013	Sriracha F.C.	1-1; 1-2 AET	Songkhla United F.C.	18:30	Suzuki Stadium, Chonburi	
13	8 May 2013	Phichit F.C.	0-6	Chiangrai United F.C.	18:00	Phichit Stadium, Phichit	
14	8 May 2013	Maptaphut Rayong F.C.	1-2	Rayong F.C.	15:30	Nern Phayom Stadium, Rayong	
15	8 May 2013	Kalasin F.C.	0-5	Buriram United F.C.	17:30	Kalasin Stadium, Kalasin	
16	15 May 2013	Royal Thai Fleet F.C.	0-1	Muangthong United F.C.	18:00	Sattahip Stadium, Rayong	FootballSiam TV True Visions 114

== Third round ==
Last 16 teams
Match No.	Match date	Home	Result	Away	Time	Venue	Telecast
1	5 June 2013	Rayong F.C.	4-2	Police United F.C.	18:00	Rayong Stadium, Rayong	
2	5 June 2013	Ratchaburi F.C.	7-1	Khonkaen F.C.	18:00	Ratchaburi Stadium, Ratchaburi	
3	5 June 2013	Udon Thani F.C.	1-0	Songkhla United F.C.	18:00	Udon Thani Stadium, Udon Thani	
4	5 June 2013	Buriram United F.C.	3-1	Siam Navy F.C.	18:30	New I-Mobile Stadium, Buriram	
5	5 June 2013	Nakhon Ratchasima F.C.	1-1; 2-1 AET	Muangthong United F.C.	18:30	80th Birthday Stadium, Nakhon Ratchasima	FootballSiam TV True Visions 114
6	5 June 2013	Chiangrai United F.C.	0-0; 5-6 PEN	Chonburi F.C.	19:00	United Stadium of Chiangrai, Chiang Rai	SMMTV
7	15 June 2013	Looktabfah F.C.	2-0	Air Force AVIA F.C.	18:00	Thupathemi Stadium, Pathum Thani	
8	15 June 2013	PTT Rayong F.C.	1-1; 1-2 AET	Army United F.C.	18:00	PTT Stadium, Rayong	

== Quarter-finals ==
July 2013
#	Match No.	Match date	Home	Result	Away	Time	Venue	Telecast
1	1	3 July 2013	Army United F.C.	1-0	Nakhon Ratchasima F.C.	19:00	Thai Army Sports Stadium, Bangkok	Siamsport Live True Visions 116
	2	31 July 2013	Nakhon Ratchasima F.C.	2-0	Army United F.C.	18:30	80th Birthday Stadium, Nakhon Ratchasima	SMMTV
Aggregate			Nakhon Ratchasima F.C.	2-1	Army United F.C.			
2	1	3 July 2013	Ratchaburi F.C.	1-0	Chonburi F.C.	18:00	Ratchaburi Stadium, Ratchaburi	Siamsport Football True Visions 115
	2	31 July 2013	Chonburi F.C.	2-2	Ratchaburi F.C.	19:00	Chonburi Stadium, Chonburi	Siamsport Football True Visions 115
Aggregate			Ratchaburi F.C.	3-2	Chonburi F.C.			
3	1	3 July 2013	Rayong F.C.	1-1	Looktabfah F.C.	18:00	Rayong Stadium, Rayong	
	2	31 July 2013	Looktabfah F.C.	1-2	Rayong F.C.	18:00	Thupathemi Stadium, Pathum Thani	
Aggregate			Rayong F.C.	3-2	Looktabfah F.C.			
4	1	3 July 2013	Buriram United F.C.	1-0	Udon Thani F.C.	18:30	New I-Mobile Stadium, Buriram	SMMTV
	2	31 July 2013	Udon Thani F.C.	1-2	Buriram United F.C.	19:00	Institute of Physical Education Udon Thani Stadium, Udon Thani	
Aggregate			Buriram United F.C.	3-1	Udon Thani F.C.			

== Semi-finals ==
September–October 2013
#	Match No.	Match date	Home	Result	Away	Time	Venue	Telecast
1	1	18 September 2013	Ratchaburi F.C.	0-0	Nakhon Ratchasima F.C.	19:00	Ratchaburi Stadium, Ratchaburi	Siamsport Football True Visions 115
	2	2 October 2013	Nakhon Ratchasima F.C.	1-1	Ratchaburi F.C.	19:00	80th Birthday Stadium, Nakhon Ratchasima	Siamsport Football True Visions 115
Aggregate			Ratchaburi F.C.	1-1	Nakhon Ratchasima F.C.			
2	1	4 September 2013	Rayong F.C.	1-0	Buriram United F.C.	19:00	Rayong Stadium, Rayong	SMMTV
	2	2 October 2013	Buriram United F.C.	5-0	Rayong F.C.	19:00	New I-Mobile Stadium, Buriram	SMMTV
Aggregate			Buriram United F.C.	5-1	Rayong F.C.			

== Final ==
November 2013
Match No.	Match date	Home	Result	Away	Time	Venue	Telecast
1	23 November 2013	Ratchaburi F.C.	1-2	Buriram United F.C.	18:00	Thammasat Stadium, Pathum Thani	Channel 3 (Thailand)
