= Songkhla United F.C. =

Thai football club

Songkhla United สงขลา ยูไนเต็ด
- Full name: Songkhla United Football Club สโมสรฟุตบอลสงขลา ยูไนเต็ด
- Nicknames: The Southern Fighting Bulls (วัวชนแดนใต้)
- Short name: SKHL
- Founded: 2009; as Buriram Football Club; 2012; as Wuachon United Football Club; 2013; as Songkhla United Football Club
- Dissolved: 2019
- Ground: Tinsulanonda Stadium; Songkhla, Thailand
- Capacity: 20,000
Home colours	Away colours	Third colours

Songkhla United Football Club (Thai: สโมสรฟุตบอลสงขลา ยูไนเต็ด) is a Thai defunct professional football club based in Songkhla Province.

== History ==
=== 2009–2011 Buriram or early years ===
The club was founded in 2009 as Buriram Football Club by its president, Karuna Chidchob, who is the wife of Buriram United president Newin Chidchob.

=== 2012 moved to Songkhla ===
On 9 January 2012 it was announced that Thai Premier League side Buriram PEA F.C. owner Newin Chidchob would buy out promoted Thai Division 1 League side Buriram F.C. after Newin Chidchob bought the club he sold the rights to Songkhla F.C. Chidchob's reason for selling the rights to Songkhla F.C. was to help provincial football stating that Southern Thailand was the only area in Thailand that had never had a Thai Premier League side. After Songkhla F.C. got the rights to the team they requested from the Football Association of Thailand to move the club from Buriram Province to Songkhla Province. They hoped to change the name of Buriram F.C. to Wuachon United F.C. and to have two Songkhla teams, one competing in the Thai Division 1 League and the other Songkhla F.C. competing in the Thai Premier League.

On 20 May 2012, for the match Wuachon 1–4 Muangthong United, the highest attendance at Tinsulanon Stadium of 30,102 was recorded.

=== 2013 united with the local team ===
In 2013, Wauchon United has decided to unit with the local team, Songkhla F.C., as Songkhla United.

In 2018, after club-licensing didn't pass to play 2018 Thai League 3 Lower Region, the team is banned 2 years and relegated to 2020 Thai League 4 Southern Region.

== Stadium and locations ==
Coordinates	Location	Stadium	Capacity	Year
14°59′25″N 103°05′49″E	Buriram	Buriram Rajabhat University Stadium	2,500	2009
14°56′45″N 103°06′13″E	Buriram	I-mobile Stadium	14,000	2010–2011
7°12′26″N 100°35′55″E	Songkhla	Tinsulanonda Stadium	35,000	2012–2015
6°44′00″N 100°41′31″E	Songkhla	Na Thawi District Stadium	2,500	2016–2017
7°12′26″N 100°35′55″E	Songkhla	Tinsulanonda Stadium	45,000	2017–2019

== Season by season record ==
Season	League									FA Cup	League Cup	Queen's Cup	Kor Royal Cup	Asia	Top scorer	
Season	Division	P	W	D	L	F	A	Pts	Pos	FA Cup	League Cup	Queen's Cup	Kor Royal Cup	Asia	Name	Goals
2009	DIV 2 North-East	20	8	7	5	28	20	31	4th							
2010	DIV 2 North-East	30	20	5	5	73	28	65	2nd							
2011	DIV 1	34	25	8	1	84	18	83	1st	R3	R2				(Brazil) Douglas Cardozo	15
2012	TPL	34	9	14	11	46	54	41	13th	R3	QF				(Thailand) Kirati Keawsombat	7
2013	TPL	32	7	11	14	30	47	32	12th	R3	R3				(Thailand) Manop Sornkaew	7
2014	TPL	38	8	8	22	39	72	32	18th	R4	R1				(New Zealand) Kayne Vincent	13
2015	DIV 1	38	14	9	15	53	60	51	11th	R2	R1				(Spain) Rufino Sánchez	15
2016	DIV 1	26	10	9	7	35	33	39	6th	R2	SF				(Brazil) Willen Mota	20
2017	T2	32	9	7	16	38	49	34	16th	R1	Not Enter				(Georgia (country)) Giorgi Tsimakuridze	8
2018–2019	Banned 2 years from Club-licensing don't pass															

Champions	Runners-up	Third Place	Promoted	Relegated

- P = Played
- W = Games won
- D = Games drawn
- L = Games lost
- F = Goals for
- A = Goals against
- Pts = Points
- Pos = Final position
- TPL = Thai Premier League
- T1 = Thai League 1
- T2 = Thai League 2
- T3 = Thai League 3
- QR1 = First Qualifying Round
- QR2 = Second Qualifying Round
- QR3 = Third Qualifying Round
- QR4 = Fourth Qualifying Round
- RInt = Intermediate Round
- R1 = Round 1
- R2 = Round 2
- R3 = Round 3
- R4 = Round 4
- R5 = Round 5
- R6 = Round 6
- GR = Group Stage
- QF = Quarter-finals
- SF = Semi-finals
- RU = Runners-up
- S = Shared
- W = Winners

== Honours ==
=== Domestic ===
as Buriram Football Club

- Thai Division 1 League
  - Winners (1): 2011
- Regional League Division 2
  - Winners (1): 2010
- Regional League North-East Division
  - Runners-up (1): 2010
