= 2012 Thai League Cup =

Tournament details
- Country: Thailand
- Dates: 3 April 2012 – 10 November 2012
- Teams: 105

Final positions
- Champions: Buriram United (2nd title)
- Runners-up: Ratchaburi Mitphol

Tournament statistics
- Matches played: 108
- Goals scored: 330 (3.06 per match)
- Top goal scorer(s): Cleiton Silva (6 goals)

Awards
- Best player: Apichet Puttan

The Thai League Cup is a knock-out football tournament played in Thai sport. Some games are played as a single match, others are played as two-legged contests. The 2012 Thai League Cup kicked off on 3 April 2012 with the Bangkok & field regional qualifiers.

Buriram United F.C. were the winners.

== Calendar ==
Round	Date	Matches	Clubs	New entries this round
Qualifying first round	3,4 April 2012	27	54 → 13 to first round and 14 to qualifying second round	54
Qualifying second round	11 April 2012	14	14 + 14 → 14	14
First round	9,10 June 2012	32	13 + 14 + 1 + 18 + 18 → 32	18 2012 Thai Premier League and 18 2012 Thai Division 1 League, 1 Yala
Second Round	11 July 2012	16	32 → 16	
Third Round	22 August 2012	8	16 → 8	
Quarter-finals	5 September 2012	8	8 → 4	
Quarter-finals	11, 19 September 2012	8	8 → 4	
Semi-finals	26 September 2012	4	4 → 2	
Semi-finals	17 October 2012	4	4 → 2	
Final	10 November 2012	1	2 → Champions	
Total				105 clubs

== Qualifying first round ==
Team 1	Score	Team 2
Northern Region
3 April 2012
Paknampho NSRU	2–1	Phitsanulok
4 April 2012
Kamphaeng Phet	2–1	Nan
Chiangrai	4–0	Tak
Phichit	1–0	Uttaradit
Lampang	4–2	Uthai Thani
Lamphun	6–1	Sukhothai
North Eastern Region
3 April 2012
Mahasarakham City	1–2	Sisaket United
Udon Thani	1–0	Ubon Tiger
4 April 2012
Chaiyaphum United	4–1	Yasothon United
Nong Bua Lamphu	0–2	Roi Et United
Surin	3–1	Amnat Charoen Town
Kalasin	6–1	Mukdahan
Bangkok & field Region
3 April 2012
Chamchuri United	0–0 (2 – 4 p)	Kasetsart University
Nonthaburi	1–2	Thai Honda
RBAC BEC Tero Sasana	3–2	Central Lions
4 April 2012
Kasem Bundit University	2–0	Rangsit
Customs United	2–2 (8 – 7 p)	Rayong United
Samut Prakan United	1–0	Krung Thonburi
Central & Eastern Region
4 April 2012
Kabinburi	0–2	Sa Kaeo United
Trat	1–0	Pathum Thani
Nakhon Nayok	0–2	Lopburi
Thanyaburi RA United	0–3	Rayong
Prachuap Khiri Khan	2–0	Samut Prakan
6 April 2012
Prachinburi United	2–3	Phetchaburi
Southern Region
3 April 2012
Nakhon Si Thammarat	2–2 (7 – 5 p)	Nara United
Pattani	1–1 (5 – 2 p)	Phang Nga
Surat	1–2	Hat Yai

== Qualifying Second round ==
Team 1	Score	Team 2
Northern Region
11 April 2012
Kamphaeng Phet	2–0	Nakhon Sawan
Chiangrai	1–0	Phetchabun
Paknampho NSRU	5–2	Singburi
North Eastern Region
11 April 2012
Chaiyaphum United	0–0 (4 – 2 p)	Nong Khai
Udon Thani	2–1	Sakon Nakhon
Roi Et	6–2	Nakhon Phanom
Bangkok & field Region
11 April 2012
Kasetsart University	2–0	Globlex
Thai Honda	3–1	Thai Airways-Look Isan
Central & Eastern Region
11 April 2012
Phetchaburi	2–1	Ayutthaya
Sa Kaeo United	1–0	Cha Choeng Sao
Trat	2–0	Muangkan
Lopburi	1–0	Ang Thong
Rayong	5–0	Royal Thai Fleet
Prachuap Khiri Khan	3–0	Maptaphut Rayong

== First round ==
Team 1	Score	Team 2
9 June 2012
Pattani	(w/o) ^{1}	Saraburi
Kasetsart University	4–0	Esan United
Sa Kaeo United	0–1	Phuket
Paknampho NSRU	1–1 (3 – 1aet)	Army United
RBAC BEC Tero Sasana	3–4	Bangkok Glass
Customs United	2–1	BBCU
Thai Honda	1–2	Muangthong United
Yala	0–1	Thai Port
Sisaket United	0–2	Osotspa Saraburi
Nakhon Si Thammarat	0–1	Chonburi
Ratchaburi	3–3 (4 – 3aet)	Chainat
Lopburi	0–0 (4 – 3aet)	PTT Rayong
Trat	2–0	Bangkok
Kalasin	0–1	Samut Songkhram
Prachuap Khiri Khan	1–2	Pattaya United
Kamphaeng Phet	0–0 (2 – 4 p)	Chiangrai United
Rayong	2–2 (6 – 7 p)	TTM Chiangmai
Phichit	0–2	Songkhla
Hat Yai	3–0	Raj Pracha Thailand
Phattalung	2–1	Police United
Siam Navy	0–1	Khonkaen
10 June 2012
Samut Prakan United	3–1	J.W. Rangsit
Lampang	0–5	BEC Tero Sasana
Sriracha	0–1	Nakhon Ratchasima
Lamphun	0–0 (4 – 3aet)	Bangkok United
Roi Et	2–3	Buriram United
Chiangrai	2–4	Krabi
Surin	0–5	Wuachon United
Udon Thani	0–2	Suphanburi
Phetchaburi	3–0	Chanthaburi
Chaiyaphum United	0–1	TOT
Kasem Bundit University	1–2	Air Force United

== Second round ==
Team 1	Score	Team 2
11 July 2012
Paknampho NSRU	0–4	Chiangrai United
Kasetsart University	1–1 (1 – 2 aet)	Wuachon United
Samut Prakan United	1–1 (5 – 4 p)	Phuket
Air Force United	1–3	Pattaya United
Customs United	1–1 (5 – 4 p)	Krabi
Pattani	2–1	Osotspa Saraburi
Phetchaburi	0–4	Chonburi
Songkhla	2–2 (5 – 6 p)	TOT
Trat	2–3	Ratchaburi
Lopburi	0–1	TTM Chiangmai
Phattalung	2–4	Bangkok Glass
Khonkaen	0–2	Thai Port
Lamphun	1–2	BEC Tero Sasana
Hat Yai	0–1	Buriram United
Suphanburi	2–0	Samut Songkhram
Nakhon Ratchasima	1–2	Muangthong United

== Third round ==
Team 1	Score	Team 2
22 August 2012
Thai Port	0–2	Muangthong United
Bangkok Glass	3–1	Chiangrai United
Suphanburi	1–3	BEC Tero Sasana
TOT	3–0	TTM Chiangmai
Ratchaburi	1–0	Pattaya United
Pattani	0–1	Wuachon United
Samut Prakan United	0–1	Buriram United
Customs United	0–2	Chonburi

== Quarter-finals ==
Team 1	Agg.	Team 2	1st leg	2nd leg	1st leg on 5 September 2012.............2nd leg on 11,19 September 2012
Bangkok Glass	2–1	Chonburi	1–0	1 – 1	
Buriram United	3–3	BEC Tero Sasana	1–1	2 – 2	
Ratchaburi	2–1	Wuachon United	2–0	0 – 1	
SCG Muangthong United	3–4	TOT	1–2	2 – 2	

== Semi-finals ==
Team 1	Agg.	Team 2	1st leg	2nd leg	1st leg on 26 September 2012.............2nd leg on 17 October 2012
Ratchaburi Mitphol	3–2	TOT	1–0	2 – 2	
Bangkok Glass	2–4	Buriram United	2–3	0 – 1	

== Finals ==
Team 1	Score	Team 2
10 November 2012
Ratchaburi Mitphol	1–4	Buriram United
