= 2013 Thai FA Cup =

Tournament details
- Country: Thailand
- Dates: 13 March 2013 – 10 November 2013
- Teams: 86

Final positions
- Champions: Buriram United (3rd title)
- Runners-up: Bangkok Glass

Tournament statistics
- Matches played: 85
- Goals scored: 253 (2.98 per match)
- Top goal scorer(s): Kirati Keawsombat; 5 goals

The Thai FA Cup 2013 (Thai: มูลนิธิไทยคม เอฟเอคัพ) is the 20th season of Thailand knockout football competition. The tournament is organized by the Football Association of Thailand.

The cup winner is guaranteed a place in the 2014 AFC Champions League Play-off.

Buriram United defeated Bangkok Glass, 3–1, in the final.

== Calendar ==
Round	Date	Matches	Clubs	New entries this round
Qualifying first round	13 March 2013	10	20 → 10	20 (Regional League Division 2 and Other CUP)
Qualifying Second Round	3 April 2013	20	30 + 10 → 20	30 (Regional League Division 2 and Other CUP)
First round	10 April 2013	10	20 → 10	
Second Round	24 April 2013	14	10 + 18 → 14	18 2013 Thai Division 1 League
Third Round	26 June 2013	16	14 + 18 → 16	18 2013 Thai Premier League
Fourth Round	10 July 2013	8	16 → 8	
Quarterfinals	28 August 2013	4	8 → 4	
Semifinals	25 September 2013	2	4 → 2	
Final	10 November 2013	1	2 → 1	
Total				86 clubs

== 1st qualifying round ==
13 March 2013	Korat	3–5	Nonthaburi	Nakhon Ratchasima

13 March 2013	Roi Et United	2–1	Customs United	Roi Et Stadium, Roi Et

13 March 2013	Rachapreuk College	1–1 (a.e.t.) (4–2 p)	Paknampho NSRU

13 March 2013	Pluak Daeng	3–2	Air & Coastal Defence Command

13 March 2013	Chanthaburi	1–2	Bangkok Christian College	Chanthaburi Stadium, Chanthaburi

13 March 2013	Muangkan United	2–2 (a.e.t.) (4–5 p)	Sa Kaeo	Kleab Bua Stadium, Kanchanaburi

13 March 2013	Laem Chabang City	1–2	Prachuap	Laem Chabang

13 March 2013	Pattaya City	4–1	Royal Thai Fleet	Pattaya

13 March 2013	Kamphaeng Phet	1–0	Pattaya	Cha Kung Rao Stadium, Kamphaeng Phet

13 March 2013	Ang Thong	1–0	Nakhon Nayok	Ang Thong Stadium, Ang Thong

== 2nd qualifying round ==
Team 1	Score	Team 2
3 April 2013
Cha Choeng Sao	2–0	Kasetsart
Wongchaowalitkul	0–3	ChamChuri United
Nara United	0 – 0; 6 – 5p	Futela Seeker
Samut Sakhon Boorana	(w/o) ^{1}	Phayao
Yala	1 – 1; 7 – 8p	Phattalung
Mukdaharn City	0 – 0; 5 – 3p	Looktabfah Pathumthani
Thai Airways-Look Isan	2–1	Raj Pracha Bangkok Thonburi
Thai Honda	0 – 0; 6 – 5p	RBAC BEC Tero Sasana
Institute of Physical Education Samut Sakhon	1 -1; 4 – 3p	Trang
Subdistrict Administrative Organization WangMhun	2–4	Samut Prakan Customs
Nonthaburi	1 – 1; 3 – 1p	Pathum Thani United
Roi Et	6–2	Phetchaburi
Witthayalai Ratchapreuk	1–2	J.W.Group
Pluak Daeng	(w/o) ^{2}	Lampang
Bangkok Christian	2 – 2; 15 – 16p	Samut Sakhon
Sa Kaeo City	0 – 0; 6 – 5p	Krung Thonburi
Prachuap'	1–0	Phang Nga
Pattaya City	1 – 1; 4 – 3p	Phrae United
Kamphaeng Phet	2–0	Phan Thong
Ang Thong	5–1	Samut Prakan

^{1} Samut Sakhon Boorana won because Phayao withdrew
^{2} Lampang won because Pluak Daeng withdrew

== First round ==
Team 1	Score	Team 2
10 April 2013
Cha Choeng Sao	3–1	ChamChuri United
Nara United	(w/o) ^{1}	Samut Sakorn Boorana
Phattalung	(w/o) ^{2}	Mukdahan
Thai Air Look Isan	0 – 0; 2 – 4p	Thai Honda
Samut Prakan United	5–0	Institute Of Physical Education Samut Sakorn
Nonthaburi	2 – 2; 6 – 5p	Roi Et
J.W.Group	1 -1; 4 – 5p	Lampang
Samut Sakhon	1–0	Sa Kaeo City
Prachuap	3–1	Pattaya City
Kamphaeng Phet	1–2	Ang Thong

^{1} Nara United won because Samut Sakorn Boorana refused to travel to the deep south and therefore forfeited the tie
^{2} Phattalung won because Mukdahan withdrew

== Second round ==
24 April 2013	Nakhon Pathom	2–2 (a.e.t.) (4–5 p)	Nonthaburi	Nakhon Pathom Stadium, Nakhon Pathom

24 April 2013	Singhtarua	8–1	Thai Honda	PAT Stadium, Klong Toei, Bangkok

24 April 2013	Nakhon Ratchasima	4–0	Cha Choeng Sao	5th December Stadium, Nakhon Ratchasima

24 April 2013	BBCU	5–0	Lampang	Thai Army Sports Stadium, Bangkok

24 April 2013	PTT Rayong	2–0 (a.e.t.)	Rayong United	PTT Stadium, Rayong

24 April 2013	Samut Prakan United	1–2	Khonkaen	Samut Prakan United Stadium, Samut Prakan

24 April 2013	Trat	2–1	Krabi	Trat Stadium, Trat

24 April 2013	Air Force United	0–1	Phuket	Thupatemee Stadium, Rangsit

24 April 2013	Prachuap	3–1	Ayutthaya	Thanarat Stadium, Prachuap Khiri Khan

24 April 2013	Phattalung	1–0	Samut Sakhon	Phatthalung Stadium, Phatthalung

24 April 2013	TTM Lopburi	2–0	Saraburi	Lopburi Stadium, Lopburi

24 April 2013	Bangkok	2–1	Ang Thong	72-years Anniversary Stadium, Bangkok

24 April 2013	Nara United	1–1 (a.e.t.) (2–3 p)	Siam Navy	Narathiwat Provincial Administrative Organization Stadium, Narathiwat

24 April 2013	Rayong	2–1	Sriracha	Rayong Stadium, Rayong

== Third round ==
26 June 2013	Phuket	2–0	Ratchaburi	Surakul Stadium, Phuket

26 June 2013	Rayong	2–3	PTT Rayong	Rayong Province Central Stadium, Rayong

26 June 2013	Siam Navy	0–1	Singhtarua	Sattahip Navy Stadium, Sattahip

26 June 2013	Bangkok Glass	1–0 (a.e.t.)	Chonburi	Leo Stadium, Pathum Thani
				Referee: Thanom Borikut

26 June 2013	Muangthong United	5–2	Songkhla United	SCG Stadium, Nonthaburi
				Referee: Manop Pansakorn

26 June 2013	TOT	0–1	Police United	TOT Stadium Chaeng Watthana, Lak Si District, Bangkok

26 June 2013	Buriram United	2–1	Chainat	New I-Mobile Stadium, Buriram

26 June 2013	Samut Songkhram	2–0	TTM Lopburi	Samut Songkhram Stadium, Samut Songkhram

26 June 2013	Chiangrai United	2–0	Khonkaen	United Stadium, Chiang Rai
				Referee: Sivakorn Pu-Udom

26 June 2013	Suphanburi	0–1	Army United	Suphanburi Municipality Stadium, Suphanburi

26 June 2013	Osotspa Saraburi	2–0	Nonthaburi	Saraburi Stadium, Saraburi

26 June 2013	Trat	5–4	BBCU	Trat Stadium, Trat

26 June 2013	BEC Tero Sasana	7–2	Pattaya United	72-years Anniversary Stadium, Min Buri District, Bangkok

26 June 2013	Bangkok United	1–1 (a.e.t.) (4–2 p)	Prachuap	Thai-Japanese Stadium, Din Daeng, Bangkok

26 June 2013	Sisaket	(w/o) ^{1}	Bangkok	Sri Nakhon Lamduan Stadium, Sisaket

27 June 2013	Phattalung	2 – 1 ^{2}	Nakhon Ratchasima	Phattalung Stadium, Phattalung

^{1} Bangkok won because Sisaket was suspended
^{2} Match was abandoned at 45' (1–0) due to floodlight failure; completed on June 27

== Fourth round ==
10 July 2013	Police United	4–2	Osotsapa Saraburi	Thammasat Stadium, Pathum Thani

10 July 2013	Trat	1–2	Bangkok Glass	Trat Stadium, Trat

10 July 2013	BEC Tero Sasana	1–2	PTT Rayong	72-years Anniversary Stadium, Min Buri District, Bangkok

10 July 2013	Phattalung	1–3	Chiangrai United	Phattalung Stadium, Phattalung

10 July 2013	Samut Songkhram	0–2	Buriram United	Samut Songkhram Stadium, Samut Songkhram

10 July 2013	Bangkok	3–3 (a.e.t.) (5–3 p)	Army United	72-years Anniversary Stadium, Thung Khru District, Bangkok

10 July 2013	Muangthong United	5–0	Phuket	SCG Stadium, Nonthaburi
				Referee: Sumate Saiwaew

10 July 2013	Singhtaura	2–1	Bangkok United	PAT Stadium, Khlong Toei District, Bangkok

== Quarterfinals ==
28 August 2013	PTT Rayong	3–4 (a.e.t.)	Muangthong United	PTT Stadium, Rayong

28 August 2013	Bangkok	0–1	Bangkok Glass	72-years Anniversary Stadium, Thung Khru District, Bangkok
				Referee: Anuwat Feemuechang

28 August 2013	Police United	0–0 (a.e.t.) (3–1 p)	Chiangrai United	Thammasat Stadium, Pathum Thani

28 August 2013	Buriram United	3–0	Singhtarua	New I-Mobile Stadium, Buriram

== Semifinals ==
25 September 2013	Police United	2–5	Bangkok Glass	Rajamangala Stadium, Bang Kapi, Bangkok
19.00 UTC+7	Paitoon 26'; Pinyo 90'		Teeratep 20', 34'; Michelini 60'; Korakot 63'; Goran Jerković 87'

25 September 2013	Buriram United	1–0	Muangthong United	Thammasat Stadium, Pathum Thani
19.00 UTC+7	Manuel Redondo Garcia 47'			Referee: Lee Min-Hu (South Korea)

== Final ==
10 November 2013	Bangkok Glass	1–3	Buriram United	Thammasat Stadium, Pathum Thani
11:00 GMT	Chatree 17'		Osmar 32' (pen.); Carmelo González 53'; Kai 59'	Referee: Yudai Yamamoto (Japan)
