= 2012 Thai FA Cup =

Thai Com FA Cup 2012

Tournament details
- Country: Thailand
- Dates: 25 April 2012 – 4 November 2012
- Teams: 77

Final positions
- Champions: Buriram United (2nd title)
- Runner-up: Army United

Tournament statistics
- Matches played: 74
- Goals scored: 212 (2.86 per match)
- Top goal scorer(s): Goran Jerković; 9 goals

The Thai FA Cup 2012 (Thai: มูลนิธิไทยคม เอฟเอคัพ) is the 19th season of Thailand knockout football competition. The Football Association of Thailand organizes the tournament.

The cup winner was guaranteed a place in the 2013 AFC Champions League.

== Calendar ==
Round	Date	Matches	Clubs	New entries this round
Qualifying Round	25,26 April 2012	20	40 → 20	40
First Round	2 May 2012	11	20 + 2 → 11	2
Second Round	9,16 May 2012	14	11 + 17 → 14	17 2012 Thai Division 1 League non Saraburi withdrew
Third Round	1,15 August 2012	16	14 + 18 → 16	18 2012 Thai Premier League
Fourth Round	29 August 2012	8	16 → 8	
Quarter-finals	3 October 2012	4	8 → 4	
Semi-finals	24,25 October 2012	2	4 → 2	
Final	4 November 2012	1	2 → 1	
Total				77 clubs

== Qualifying round ==
The Qualifying Round was held on April 25–26, 2012. Thonburi University and Paknampo NSRU FC had byes.

Team 1	Score	Team 2
25 April 2012
Trat	5–0	Visut Rangsi
Kasem Bundit University	2–1	Phetchaburi
Sa Kaeo	3–1	Tak
Ratchaphruek College	1- 1 ( 5 – 3 p)	Ang Thong
Udon Thani	1 – 1 (4 – 5 p)	RBAC-BEC Tero Sasana
Ranong	(w/o) ^{1}	Samut Prakan Customs United
Kasetsart University	4–0	Nakhon Si Thammarat
Ayutthaya	2–0	Air and Coastal Defence Command
Samut Prakan United	1 – 1 (3 – 5 p)	Prachuap Khiri Khan
Thai Airways-Look Isan	1–2	Rayong
Samut Prakan	0–2	Loei City
Maptaphut Rayong	2–1	Thai Railway SA
TPK Sriracha	2 – 2 (5 – 4 p)	Pattaya 8 School
Donmuang Police Station	2 – 2 (3 – 5 p)	Krung Thonburi
Kaokhwang Municipality	1–2	Thai Honda
Roi Et United	2 – 2 (5 – 4 p)	Royal Thai Fleet
Pattaya City	2- 1	Rangsit
Hat Yai	6–1	Chiangrai
Kamphaeng Phet	2–0	Lamphun Warrior
26 April 2012
Prachinburi United	2–1	Pratuang Tip

^{1} Ranong won because Samut Prakan Customs United withdrew

== First round ==
The first round matches were held on May 2, 2012.

Team 1	Score	Team 2
2 May 2012
Trat	2–0	Kasem Bundit University
Ratchaphruek College	1 – 1 (5 – 3 p)	Sa Kaeo
RBAC-BEC Tero Sasana	2–1	Ranong
Ayutthaya	1–0	Kasetsart University
Rayong	3–1	Prachuap Khiri Khan
TPK Sriracha	0–1	Maptaphut Rayong
Krung Thonburi	3–1	Loei City
Thai Honda	1–0	Prachinburi United
Roi Et United	1 – 1 (4 – 5 p)	Pattaya City
Hat Yai	1–0	Kamphaeng Phet
Paknampho NSRU	3 – 3 (5 – 3 p)	ThonBuri University

== Second round ==
The draw for the second round was held on 3 May 2012. Matches were held on May 9 and 16, 2012.

Team 1	Score	Team 2
9 May 2012
Phattalung	0–1	Suphanburi
PTT Rayong	3–2	Sriracha
Air Force United	1–2	Songkhla
RBAC-BEC Tero Sasana	1–2	Ratchaburi Mitphol
Bangkok United	4–0	Thai Honda
Paknampho NSRU	0–1	Rayong
Hat Yai	2–1	Krung Thonburi
Siam Navy	0–3	Ayutthaya
Maptaphut Rayong	2–3	Nakhon Ratchasima
Trat	(w/o) ^{1}	F.C. Phuket
16 May 2012
J.W. Rangsit	1–4	Krabi
Ratchaphruek College	1 – 1 (4 – 5 p)	Bangkok
Khonkaen	4–1	Pattaya City
Raj-Pracha	2–1	Chanthaburi

^{1} Trat won because F.C. Phuket withdrew

== Third round ==
The draw for the third round was held on 29 May 2012. Matches were held on 1 and 15 August 2012.

Team 1	Score	Team 2
1 August 2012
Suphanburi	1 – 1 (2 – 1 aet)	Bangkok
Chainat	1–0	TOT
Bangkok Glass	3–0	Osotspa Saraburi
Police United	0 – 0 (6 – 5 p)	Wuachon United
Ayutthaya	1 – 1 (2 – 1 aet)	Krabi
Buriram United	3–2	Chonburi
Army United	1 – 1 (4 – 5 p) ^{1}	Trat
Pattaya United	0–1	BEC Tero Sasana
SCG Muangthong United	2–1	Hat Yai
BBCU	0–1	Ratchaburi Mitphol
Rayong	2 – 2 (2 – 3 aet)	Thai Port
15 August 2012
Khonkaen	0–1	Chiangrai United
PTT Rayong	1 – 1 (4 – 3 p)	Esan United
Samut Songkhram	1–0	Raj-Pracha
TTM Chiangmai	1 – 1 (2 – 3 p)	Nakhon Ratchasima
Songkhla	2–1	Bangkok United

^{1} Army United won because Trat players that break the rules

== Fourth round ==
The draw for the third round was held on 17 August 2012. Matches were held on 29 August 2012.

Team 1	Score	Team 2
29 August 2012
SCG Muangthong United	2–0	Nakhon Ratchasima
PTT Rayong	0 – 0 (1 – 3p)	Army United
Chiangrai United	2 – 2 (5 – 4p)	Police United
Songkhla	0–1	Suphanburi
Buriram United	7–1	Ratchaburi Mitphol
BEC Tero Sasana	3–1	Samut Songkhram
Bangkok Glass	1–0	Chainat
Ayutthaya	2–1	Thai Port

== Quarter-finals ==
Team 1	Score	Team 2
3 October 2012
Army United	3–2	SCG Muangthong United
Chiangrai United	1 – 1 (3 – 1 aet)	Suphanburi
Buriram United	3–0	BEC Tero Sasana
Ayutthaya	1–2	Bangkok Glass

== Semi-finals ==
Team 1	Score	Team 2
24,25 October 2012
Chiangrai United	1–2	Army United
Buriram United	2–0	Bangkok Glass

== Final ==
Team 1	Score	Team 2
4 November 2012
Army United	1–2	Buriram United
