= 2022–23 Buriram United F.C. season =

Buriram United
2022–23 season
- Chairman: Newin Chidchob
- Head coach: Masatada Ishii
- Stadium: Chang Arena
- Thai League: 1st
- FA Cup: Winners
- League Cup: Winners
- Thailand Champions Cup: Runners-up
- Top goalscorer: Supachai Chaided (19 goals)
- Highest home attendance: 29,461 (Buriram United 2–3 Port) (Thai League 1, 30 April 2023)
- Lowest home attendance: 12,290 (Buriram United 5–1 Samut Prakan City) (Thai FA Cup, 2 November 2022)
- Average home league attendance: 21,440
- Biggest win: 6–1 (Buriram United vs Sukhothai) (Thai League 1, 19 August 2022)
- Biggest defeat: 4–3 (True Bangkok United vs Buriram United) (Thai League 1, 4 April 2023); 2–3 (Buriram United vs Port) (Thai League 1, 30 April 2023)
Home colours	Away colours

The 2022–23 season is Buriram United's 11th season in the Thai League. (13th if including P.E.A.'s two seasons) The club will participate in the Thai League and two domestic cups: FA Cup and League Cup.

Buriram United kicked off the season by losing the 2022 Thailand Champions Cup to BG Pathum United 2–3.

The 2022–23 season marks Masatada Ishii's first full season in charge of Buriram. This is also the first season since 2010 not to feature Jakkaphan Kaewprom, who left at the end of the previous season to transfer to Ratchaburi, also the first season since 2014 not to feature Supachok Sarachat, who had initially been loaned to Japanese club Consadole Sapporo before transferred there permanently on 12 November 2022.

== Club information ==
Owner	(Thailand) Newin Chidchob
Head Coach	(Japan) Masatada Ishii
Team Manager	(Thailand) Tadthep Pitakpoolsin
Assistant managers	(Japan) Masayuki Miura
Goalkeeping Coach	(Serbia) Zoran Mijanović
Conditioning Coach	(Serbia) Goran Basic
Physio	(Serbia) Dušan Nikolic
Head of Youth Development	(England) Andrew Ord
Ground (capacity and dimensions)	Chang Arena (32,600 / 4,046 m^{2})
Training Ground	Chang Training Ground, Buriram; Buriram Training Camp, Buriram; Buriram United Football Camp, Bang Bo, Samut Prakan

Source: on the table

== Mid-season friendly ==
Win Draw Loss

12 November 2022	Buriram United (Thailand)	5–2	(Japan) Consadole Sapporo	Buriram
19:00 UTC+7	Masika 7'; Nakamura 9' (o.g.); Arthit 61'; Doumbouya 66'; Supachai 86'	Report	Ogashiwa 14'; Fujimura 16'	Stadium: Chang Arena

== Competitions ==
=== Overview ===
Competition	First match	Last match	Starting round	Final position	Record							
Competition	First match	Last match	Starting round	Final position	Pld	W	D	L	GF	GA	GD	Win %
Thai League	13 August 2022	12 May 2023	Matchday 1	Winners	30	23	5	2	75	27	+48	76.67
FA Cup	2 November 2022	28 May 2023	64 teams	Winners	6	6	0	0	18	4	+14	100.00
League Cup	16 November 2022	20 May 2023	32 teams	Winners	5	5	0	0	11	1	+10	100.00
Champions Cup	6 August 2022		Final	Runners-up	1	0	0	1	2	3	−1	0.00
Total					42	34	5	3	106	35	+71	80.95

Source: Competitions

=== Champions Cup ===
6 August 2022 Final	Buriram United	2–3	BG Pathum United	Nakhon Ratchasima
18:00 UTC+7	Jonathan Bolingi 35', 84' (pen.)	Report	Pathompol Charoenrattanapirom 6'; Ikhsan Fandi 38'; Worachit Kanitsribampen 51'	Stadium: 80th Birthday Stadium

=== Thai League ===
==== League table ====
Pos	Team	Pld	W	D	L	GF	GA	GD	Pts	Qualification
1	Buriram United (Note: As 2021–22 Thai League 1 winners) (C, Q)	30	23	5	2	75	27	+48	74	Qualification for 2023–24 AFC Champions League group stage
2	Bangkok United (Q)	30	19	5	6	55	22	+33	62	Qualification for 2023–24 AFC Champions League group stage
3	Port (Q)	30	14	10	6	52	38	+14	52	Qualification for 2023–24 AFC Champions League qualifying play-offs
4	Muangthong United	30	14	8	8	56	37	+19	50	
5	Chiangrai United	30	12	8	10	44	42	+2	44	

Updated to match(es) played on 12 May 2023. Source: Thai League
Rules for classification: 1) Points; 2) Head-to-head points; 3) Head-to-head goals difference; 4) Head-to-head goals scored; 5) Overall goals difference; 6) Overall goals scored; 7) Fair play points; 8) Play-off without extra time;).
(C) Champions; (Q) Qualified for the phase indicated

==== Results overview ====
Overall								Home						Away					
Pld	W	D	L	GF	GA	GD	Pts	W	D	L	GF	GA	GD	W	D	L	GF	GA	GD
30	23	5	2	75	27	+48	74	12	2	1	40	11	+29	11	3	1	35	16	+19

Matchday	1	2	3	4	5	6	7	8	9	10	11	12	13	14	15	16	17	18	19	20	21	22	23	24	25	26	27	28	29	30
Ground	A	H	A	H	H	A (Note: Police Tero temporarily used Ratchaburi F.C.'s Dragon Solar Park as home stadium instead of poor-conditioned Boonyachinda Stadium.)	H	A	H	A	H	A	H	A	H	A	H	A	A	H	A	H	A	H	A	H	A	H	A	H
Result	W	W	W	D	D	W	W	W	W	D	W	W	W	W	W	W	W	W	D	W	W	W	W	W	L	W	W	L	D	W
Position	3	1	2	3	5	2	2	2	1	1	1	1	1	1	1	1	1	1	1	1	1	1	1	1	1	1	1	1	1	1

Source: Thai League results
A = Away; H = Home; W = Win; D = Draw; L = Loss

==== Matches ====
13 August 2022 1	Nakhon Ratchasima Mazda	1–2	Buriram United	Nakhon Ratchasima
19:00 UTC+7	Morgan Ferrier 1'	Report	Supachai Chaided 23', 50'	Stadium: 80th Birthday Stadium; Attendance: 9,561; Referee: Natee Choosuwan

19 August 2022 2	Buriram United	6–1	Sukhothai	Buriram
19:00 UTC+7	Supachai Chaided 9', 89'; Goran Čaušić 30'; Frank Castañeda 38', 41'; Diego Bardanca 51'	Report	Sila Srikampang 90+3'	Stadium: Chang Arena; Attendance: 12,575; Referee: Phairot Bunkamnoed

27 August 2022 3	Chonburi	2–3	Buriram United	Chonburi
19:00 UTC+7	Danilo Alves 32' (pen.), 61' (pen.)	Report	Frank Castañeda 4'; Suphanat Mueanta 12', 15'	Stadium: Chonburi Stadium; Attendance: 7,799; Referee: Sivakorn Pu-udom

4 September 2022 4	Buriram United	2–2	BG Pathum United	Buriram
18:30 UTC+7	Goran Čaušić 59' (pen.); Supachai Chaided 90+3'	Report	Narubadin Weerawatnodom 26' (o.g.); Ikhsan Fandi 29'	Stadium: Chang Arena; Attendance: 21,648; Referee: Sarayut Jakngoen

11 September 2022 5	Buriram United	1–1	Muangthong United	Buriram
19:00 UTC+7	Suphanat Mueanta 58'	Report	Sardor Mirzaev 44'	Stadium: Chang Arena; Attendance: 25,943; Referee: Wiwat Jumpa-oon

17 September 2022 6	Police Tero	1–4	Buriram United	Ratchaburi
18:30 UTC+7	Marc Landry Babo 39'	Report	Lonsana Doumbouya 11', 14'; Goran Čaušić 42', 45+1'	Stadium: Dragon Solar Park; Attendance: 1,850; Referee: Torphong Somsing

2 October 2022 7	Buriram United	3–1	PT Prachuap	Buriram
19:00 UTC+7	Supachai Chaided 10', 45+2'; Goran Čaušić 37'	Report	Samuel 16'	Stadium: Chang Arena; Attendance: 14,190; Referee: Natee Choosuwan

7 October 2022 8	Lamphun Warriors	0–2	Buriram United	Mae Rim, Chiang Mai
19:00 UTC+7		Report	Jonathan Bolingi 52'; Goran Čaušić 75'	Stadium: 700th Anniversary Stadium; Attendance: 3,073; Referee: Chaireag Ngam-som

15 October 2022 9	Buriram United	3–1	Nongbua Pitchaya	Buriram
18:30 UTC+7	Jorge Fellipe 1' (o.g.); Lonsana Doumbouya 32'; Goran Čaušić 74'	Report	Barros Tardeli 34'	Stadium: Chang Arena; Attendance: 15,788; Referee: Torphong Somsing

22 October 2022 10	Khon Kaen United	1–1	Buriram United	Khon Kaen
18:30 UTC+7	Jung Han-cheol 76'	Report	Goran Čaušić 25' (pen.)	Stadium: Khon Kaen Provincial Administrative Organization Stadium; Attendance: 6,392; Referee: Wiwat Jumpa-oon

30 October 2022 11	Buriram United	1–0	True Bangkok United	Buriram
19:00 UTC+7	Suphanat Mueanta 9'	Report		Stadium: Chang Arena; Attendance: 22,353; Referee: Sivakorn Pu-udom

6 November 2022 12	Lampang	0–3	Buriram United	Lampang
18:30 UTC+7		Report	Suphanat Mueanta 38'; Lonsana Doumbouya 56'; Goran Čaušić 75'	Stadium: Lampang Province Stadium; Attendance: 3,121; Referee: Noppadet Mangngam

9 November 2022 13	Buriram United	4–1	Leo Chiangrai United	Buriram
18:00 UTC+7	Suphanat Mueanta 26'; Supachai Chaided 31', 90+4'; Lonsana Doumbouya 56' (pen.)	Report	Victor Cardozo 61'	Stadium: Chang Arena; Attendance: 16,623; Referee: Torphong Somsing

19 November 2022 14	Port	1–3	Buriram United	Khlong Toei, Bangkok
19:30 UTC+7	Elias Dolah 45+3'	Report	Theerathon Bunmathan 36'; Elias Dolah 76' (o.g.); Peeradon Chamratsamee 90+2'	Stadium: PAT Stadium; Attendance: N/A; Referee: Sivakorn Pu-udom

26 November 2022 15	Buriram United	1–0	Ratchaburi	Buriram
18:00 UTC+7	Supachai Chaided 90+1'	Report		Stadium: Chang Arena; Attendance: 19,813; Referee: Natee Choosuwan

Mid-season break for 2022 AFF Championship

22 January 2023 16	Sukhothai	0–3	Buriram United	Sukhothai
19:00 UTC+7		Report	Jonathan Bolingi 45'; Supachai Chaided 81'; Peeradon Chamratsamee 90+4'	Stadium: Thalay Luang Stadium; Attendance: 7,998; Referee: Chaireag Ngamsom

29 January 2023 17	Buriram United	2–0	Chonburi	Buriram
18:30 UTC+7	Supachai Chaided 42'; Goran Čaušić 63' (pen.)	Report		Stadium: Chang Arena; Attendance: 26,207; Referee: Sivakorn Pu-udom

4 February 2023 18	BG Pathum United	0–2	Buriram United	Thanyaburi, Pathum Thani
18:30 UTC+7		Report	Haris Vučkić 11'; Suphanat Mueanta 71'	Stadium: BG Stadium; Attendance: 10,089; Referee: Wiwat Jampa-oon

12 February 2023 19	Muangthong United	4–4	Buriram United	Pak Kret, Nonthaburi
19:00 UTC+7	Eric Johana Omondi 2', 31', 47'; Poramet Arjvirai 12'	Report	Suphanat Mueanta 38'; Lonsana Doumbouya 79', 90+3'; Theerathon Bunmathan 83'	Stadium: Thunderdome Stadium; Attendance: 10,487; Referee: Kotchapoom Meesridaecha

18 February 2023 20	Buriram United	3–0	Police Tero	Buriram
18:30 UTC+7	Goran Čaušić 37'; Peeradon Chamratsamee 84'; Supachai Chaided 90+5'	Report		Stadium: Chang Arena; Attendance: 22,995; Referee: Wiwat Jumpa-oon

26 February 2023 21	PT Prachuap	0–1	Buriram United	Prachuap Khiri Khan
17:30 UTC+7		Report	Lonsana Doumbouya 59' (pen.)	Stadium: Sam Ao Stadium; Attendance: 3,186; Referee: Phairot Bunkamnoed

5 March 2023 22	Buriram United	2–0	Lamphun Warriors	Buriram
18:00 UTC+7	Jonathan Bolingi 72'; Haris Vučkić 83'	Report		Stadium: Chang Arena; Attendance: 21,697; Referee: Akom Charoensuk

12 March 2023 23	Nongbua Pitchaya	0–1	Buriram United	Nong Bua Lamphu
19:00 UTC+7		Report	Jonathan Bolingi 23'	Stadium: Pitchaya Stadium; Attendance: 5,987; Referee: Sivakorn Pu-udom

18 March 2023 24	Buriram United	4–1	Khon Kaen United	Buriram
18:30 UTC+7	Lonsana Doumbouya 20', 45+4', 79'; Supachai Chaided 83'	Report	Ibson Melo 30'	Stadium: Chang Arena; Attendance: 21,605; Referee: Torphong Somsing

4 April 2023 25	True Bangkok United	4–3	Buriram United	Khlong Luang, Pathum Thani
19:00 UTC+7	Ratthanakorn Maikami 35' (o.g.); Thitiphan Puangchan 66'; Willen Mota 78', 90+5'	Report	Supachai Chaided 11', 33'; Goran Čaušić 82'	Stadium: Thammasat Stadium; Attendance: 8,794; Referee: Natee Choosuwan

9 April 2023 26	Buriram United	2–0	Lampang	Buriram
19:00 UTC+7	Jonathan Bolingi 5'; Lonsana Doumbouya 19' (pen.)	Report		Stadium: Chang Arena; Attendance: 22,005; Referee: Phairot Bunkamnoed

22 April 2023 27	Leo Chiangrai United	1–2	Buriram United	Chiang Rai
19:30 UTC+7	Kim Ji-min 73'	Report	Goran Čaušić 31'; Pansa Hemviboon 68'	Stadium: Leo Chiangrai Stadium; Attendance: 5,040; Referee: Torphong Somsing
Note: The match was temporarily suspended due to hailstorms.

30 April 2023 28	Buriram United	2–3	Port	Buriram
17:30 UTC+7	Haris Vučkić 42'; Supachai Chaided 65'	Report	Airton 54'; Worachit Kanitsribampen 62', 81'	Stadium: Chang Arena; Attendance: 29,461; Referee: Sivakorn Pu-udom

7 May 2023 29	Ratchaburi	1–1	Buriram United	Ratchaburi
19:00 UTC+7	Anon Amornlerdsak 25'	Report	Arthit Boodjinda 5'	Stadium: Dragon Solar Park; Attendance: 6,674; Referee: Natee Choosuwan

12 May 2023 30	Buriram United	4–0	Nakhon Ratchasima Mazda	Buriram
18:00 UTC+7	Goran Čaušić 19'; Supachai Chaided 60', 90'; Peeradon Chamratsamee 66'	Report		Stadium: Chang Arena; Attendance: 28,693; Referee: Torphong Somsing
Note: The match, originally scheduled for 14 May 2023, was postponed earlier due to consequences of general election.

=== FA Cup ===
2 November 2022 Second round	Buriram United	5–1	Samut Prakan City	Buriram
19:00 UTC+7	Jonathan Bolingi 3'; Ayub Masika 40'; Arthit Boodjinda 41'; Frank Castañeda 59'; Sasalak Haiprakhon 90+3'	Report	Petru Leucă 77'	Stadium: Chang Arena; Attendance: 12,290; Referee: Chaireag Ngamsom

30 November 2022 Third round	Buriram United	2–0	Nakhon Pathom United	Buriram
18:00 UTC+7	Suphanat Mueanta 36'; Frank Castañeda 65'	Report		Stadium: Chang Arena; Attendance: 15,295; Referee: Phairot Bunkamnoed

8 February 2023 Fourth round	Uthai Thani	1–2 (a.e.t.)	Buriram United	Uthai Thani
19:00 UTC+7	Steeven Langil 65'	Report	Lonsana Doumbouya 45+2', 119'	Stadium: Uthai Thani Province Stadium; Attendance: 4,876; Referee: Sarayut Jakngoen

1 March 2023 Quarter-finals	Buriram United	5–2	Phrae United	Buriram
19:00 UTC+7	Goran Čaušić 2' (pen.); Supachai Chaided 9', 27'; Haris Vučkić 45', 76'	Report	Apiwit Samurmuen 5'; Ratthanakorn Maikami 65' (o.g.)	Stadium: Chang Arena; Attendance: 17,177; Referee: Wiwat Jumpa-oon

19 April 2023 Semi-finals	Buriram United	2–0	Port	Ratchaburi
19:00 UTC+7	Suphanat Mueanta 60'; Airton 76' (o.g.)	Report		Stadium: Dragon Solar Park; Attendance: 6,452; Referee: Sarayut Jakngoen

28 May 2023 Final	Buriram United	2–0	True Bangkok United	Khlong Luang, Pathum Thani
18:00 UTC+7	Jonathan Bolingi	Report		Stadium: Thammasat Stadium

=== League Cup ===
16 November 2022 First round	MH Nakhonsi City	0–2	Buriram United	Tha Sala, Nakhon Si Thammarat
17:00 UTC+7		Report	Chitipat Tanklang 43'; Supachai Chaided 48'	Stadium: Walailak University Stadium; Attendance: 9,456; Referee: Noppadet Mangngam

25 January 2023 Second round	Muangthong United	1–2	Buriram United	Pak Kret, Nonthaburi
19:00 UTC+7	Willian Popp 80' (pen.)	Report	Suphanat Mueanta 37'; Lucas Rocha 88' (o.g.)	Stadium: Thunderdome Stadium; Attendance: 9,723; Referee: Torphong Somsing

22 February 2023 Quarter-finals	True Bangkok United	0–3	Buriram United	Khlong Luang, Pathum Thani
18:30 UTC+7		Report	Suphanat Mueanta 30'; Haris Vučkić 50'; Goran Čaušić 77'	Stadium: True Stadium; Attendance: 6,973; Referee: Noppadet Mangngam

26 April 2023 Semi-finals	PT Prachuap	0–2	Buriram United	Chonburi
18:00 UTC+7		Report	Chatchai Budprom 16' (o.g.); Suphanat Mueanta 77'	Stadium: Chonburi UTA Stadium; Attendance: 2,548; Referee: Phairot Bunkamnoed

20 May 2023 Final	Buriram United	2–0	BG Pathum United	Pak Kret, Nonthaburi
18:00 UTC+7	Goran Čaušić 13'; Supachai Chaided 90+3'	Report		Stadium: Thunderdome Stadium; Attendance: 10,487; Referee: Chaireag Ngamsom

== Statistics ==
=== Appearances ===
Players with no appearances are not included in the list.

No.	Pos	Nat	Player	Total		Thai League		FA Cup		League Cup		Champions Cup	
No.	Pos	Nat	Player	Apps	Goals	Apps	Goals	Apps	Goals	Apps	Goals	Apps	Goals
1	GK	(Thailand) THA	Siwarak Tedsungnoen	23	0	16	0	2	0	4	0	1	0
2	MF	(Thailand) THA	Sasalak Haiprakhon	26	1	18	0	3	1	4	0	1	0
3	DF	(Thailand) THA	Pansa Hemviboon	28	1	20	1	3	0	4	0	1	0
5	DF	(Thailand) THA	Theerathon Bunmathan	37	2	27	2	4	0	5	0	1	0
6	MF	(Thailand) THA	Peeradon Chamratsamee	37	4	26	4	5	0	5	0	1	0
7	MF	(Sweden) SWE	Filip Rogić	10	0	8	0	2	0	0	0	0	0
8	MF	(Thailand) THA	Ratthanakorn Maikami	32	0	21	0	5	0	5	0	1	0
9	FW	(Thailand) THA	Supachai Chaided	39	23	28	19	5	2	5	2	1	0
11	DF	(Malaysia) MAS	Dion Cools	20	0	14	0	2	0	4	0	0	0
14	DF	(Thailand) THA	Chitipat Tanklang	13	1	8	0	4	0	1	1	0	0
15	DF	(Thailand) THA	Narubadin Weerawatnodom	37	0	27	0	4	0	5	0	1	0
19	FW	(Slovenia) SLO	Haris Vučkić	13	6	8	3	2	2	3	1	0	0
20	MF	(Serbia) SRB	Goran Čaušić	33	17	25	14	3	1	4	2	1	0
21	FW	(Thailand) THA	Suphanat Mueanta	40	13	30	8	4	2	5	3	1	0
22	DF	(Iraq) IRQ	Rebin Sulaka	35	0	25	0	5	0	4	0	1	0
26	FW	(Guinea) GUI	Lonsana Doumbouya	21	14	16	12	3	2	2	0	0	0
29	FW	(Thailand) THA	Arthit Boodjinda	19	2	13	1	3	1	3	0	0	0
30	DF	(Thailand) THA	Maxx Peter Creevey	1	0	1	0	0	0	0	0	0	0
58	FW	(Thailand) THA	Pattara Soimalai	5	0	2	0	3	0	0	0	0	0
59	GK	(Thailand) THA	Nopphon Lakhonphon	19	0	15	0	3	0	1	0	0	0
62	MF	(Thailand) THA	Airfan Doloh	10	0	5	0	3	0	2	0	0	0
89	MF	(Thailand) THA	Pongsakron Hanrattana	2	0	1	0	1	0	0	0	0	0
92	DF	(Thailand) THA	Thawatchai Inprakhon	2	0	2	0	0	0	0	0	0	0
95	DF	(Thailand) THA	Seksan Ratree	3	0	2	0	1	0	0	0	0	0
99	FW	(Democratic Republic of the Congo) COD	Jonathan Bolingi	30	8	23	5	2	1	4	0	1	2
Left club during the season
7	FW	(Kenya) KEN	Ayub Masika	1	1	0	0	1	1	0	0	0	0
10	FW	(Colombia) COL	Frank Castañeda	13	5	9	3	2	2	1	0	1	0
11	MF	(Thailand) THA	Chutipol Thongthae	3	0	1	0	1	0	1	0	0	0
44	DF	(Philippines) PHI	Diego Bardanca	8	1	7	1	0	0	0	0	1	0
77	FW	(Myanmar) MYA	Aung Thu	3	0	2	0	1	0	0	0	0	0

Last updated: 20 May 2023
Source: Competitions

=== Goalscorers ===
Includes all competitive matches. The list is sorted by shirt number when total goals are equal.
Player who left the club during the season.
As of match played 20 May 2023

Rank	No.	Player	Thai League	FA Cup	League Cup	Champions Cup	Total
1	9	(Thailand) Supachai Chaided	19	2	2	0	23
2	20	(Serbia) Goran Čaušić	14	1	2	0	17
3	26	(Guinea) Lonsana Doumbouya	12	2	0	0	14
4	21	(Thailand) Suphanat Mueanta	8	2	3	0	13
5	99	(Democratic Republic of the Congo) Jonathan Bolingi	5	1	0	2	8
6	19	(Slovenia) Haris Vučkić	3	2	1	0	6
7	10	(Colombia) Frank Castañeda	3	2	0	0	5
8	6	(Thailand) Peeradon Chamratsamee	4	0	0	0	4
9	5	(Thailand) Theerathon Bunmathan	2	0	0	0	2
9	29	(Thailand) Arthit Boodjinda	1	1	0	0	2
10	2	(Thailand) Sasalak Haiprakhon	0	1	0	0	1
10	3	(Thailand) Pansa Hemviboon	1	0	0	0	1
10	7	(Kenya) Ayub Masika	0	1	0	0	1
10	14	(Thailand) Chitipat Tanklang	0	0	1	0	1
10	44	(Philippines) Diego Bardanca	1	0	0	0	1
Own goals			2	1	2	0	5
Totals			75	16	11	2	104

=== Clean sheets ===
As of match played 20 May 2023

No.	Player	Thai League	FA Cup	League Cup	Champions Cup	Total
1	(Thailand) Siwarak Tedsungnoen	7	1	2	0	10
59	(Thailand) Nopphon Lakhonphon	7	1	1	0	9
Total		14	2	3	0	19
