= Buriram United F.C.–Muangthong United F.C. rivalry =

Football rivalry in Thailand

Buriram United F.C. v Muangthong United F.C.
- Location: Thailand
- Teams: Buriram United F.C. Muangthong United F.C.
- First meeting: 27 February 2010; Buriram United 1–2 Muangthong United (Friendly match)
- Latest meeting: 22 March 2026; Buriram United 2–1 Muangthong United (2025–26 Thai League 1)
- Next meeting: TBD
- Stadiums: Chang Arena (Buriram United); Thunderdome Stadium (Muangthong United)

The matchup of Buriram United versus Muangthong United is considered by Thai football media and followers as the biggest football match in Thailand due to their dominance in Thai Football in the modern era. The two clubs are the most successful Thai teams in professional league age. Both clubs are the only two clubs that have won the top league of Thailand from the promotion of Muangthong United to Thai League 1 in 2009 until 2018.

Buriram United and Muangthong United are mainly the competitive rivals since both are located in the different regions of Thailand. However, both clubs also represent the different group of supporters among them. Buriram represents the rustic people in the countryside while Muangthong United symbolizes the urban people in the Bangkok Metropolitan Region since Muangthong is located in Nonthaburi Province which was the part of Thailand capital city, Bangkok until 1956 while and Buriram United is located on the frontier side, Buriram Province which is 238-mile-far from Bangkok.

== History ==
=== Promotion of Muangthong United ===
Muangthong United was founded in 1989 as Nongjorg Pittayanusorn Football Club by Worawi Makudi.

In 2009, Muangthong United which has owned by Siam Sport Syndicate (Thai biggest sports multimedia) successfully climbed three divisions from Thai Regional League Division 2 to Thai Premier League within the 3 years of span. The newly promoted club invested the significant of a fund to the team since they had a high ambition to reach the continental football. In that season, Provincial Electricity Authority F.C. (PEA) (later re-established to Buriram United) was the defending champion from the 2008 season. Both clubs met two times in the league and Muangthong won all of them. Muangthong finished their first season in their top league with the champion title. PEA FC finished at a ninth place out of sixteen clubs in the league.

=== Establishing of Buriram United ===
In December 2009 after the underwhelming performance of PEA FC, it was announced that a politician based in Buriram, Newin Chidchob was to take over the club. He had already tried unsuccessfully to take over TOT SC and Royal Thai Army FC Newin relocated the club to Buriram in Isan and rebranded it to Buriram PEA Football Club. The Buriram PEA inherited most of the players from the former PEA club included the stars like Rangsan Vivatchaichok, Apichet Puttan and Theerathon Bunmathan. Pongphan Wongsuwan who was a long-time head coach of TOT S.C. was instated as coach. Thailand national team member Suchao Nuchnum of TOT S.C. also followed his coach to the new team.

Muanthong United won back-to-back Thai Premier League in 2010 while Buriram finished as the runner-up in their first season of a new era.

=== The Rivalry ===
In the early state of both clubs, the rivalry was mainly the competitive contest between them. However, it later developed into the conflict among supporters.

The rivalry of both teams started in 2012 from the conflict between Football Association of Thailand and Buriram United. Worawi Makudi who was the founder of Muangthong United has the deep relation with Siam Sports Syndicate was that time the president of the FAT. Newin Chidchob, the president of Buriram United frequently questioned the transparency of FAT and the bias of referees and schedule toward Muangthong United. Due to the conflict, Siam Sport eventually bashed Newin Chidchob and Buriram United through their media channels which covered most of the local football in Thailand in that time.

In the late of 2012 season, Buriram United won Thai Premier League and request to hold the Trophy ceremony at their home in the match before the last one. However, that time FAT president Worawi Makudi declined the request and forced them to receive the trophy at United Stadium of Chiang Rai that was the venue of their last match. After the game, Buriram United reacted by sending two staff to receive the trophy and head back to the club without any celebration to show their protest against the Makudi.

Buriram United and Muangthong United have become the opposite poles after that. The supporters started to throw the hate to each side. Both supporters packed the stadium of two clubs whenever there was the matchup between them.

== Honours ==
As of 3 June 2025

The premier honours of Buriram United Muangthong United since 2009

Competition	Buriram United	Muangthong United	Total
Thai League 1	10	4	14
Thai FA Cup	7	0	7
Thai League Cup	8	2	9^{[1]}
Kor Royal Cup/Thailand Champions Cup	5	2	7
Toyota Premier Cup	3	0	3
Mekong Club Championship	2	1	3
ASEAN Club Championship	2	0	2
Total	36	9	44

^{1} Buriram United and Muangthong United share the title of 2016 Thai League Cup winner.

== Head-to-head ==
As of 22 March 2026

The competitive head-to-head of Buriram United and Muangthong United since 2010

Competition	Buriram United win	Draw	Muangthong United win	Total
Thai League 1	15	13	4	32
Thai FA Cup	5	0	1	6
Thai League Cup	2	1	2	5
Kor Royal Cup	3	0	0	3
Total	25	14	7	46

== All-time results ==
As of 22 March 2026

Fixtures from 2010 to the present day featuring League games, Thai FA Cup, Thai League Cup, Kor Royal Cup and Exhibition game.

#	Date	Competition	Venue	Home club	Score	Buriram United Scorers/Red cards	Muangthong United Scorers/Red cards	Report
1	27 February 2010	Friendly match	Khao Kradong Stadium	Buriram United	1–2	Dudu	Christian Kouakou, Yaya Soumahoro	
2	5 May 2010	2010 Thai Premier League	SCG Stadium	Muangthong United	0–0			
3	22 August 2010	2010 Thai Premier League	Khao Kradong Stadium	Buriram United	1–0	Douglas		
4	2 April 2011	2011 Thai Premier League	SCG Stadium	Muangthong United	0–0			
5	31 December 2011	2011 Thai Premier League	New I-Mobile Stadium	Buriram United	1–0	Bouba Abbo		
6	11 January 2012	2011 Thai FA Cup - final	Supachalasai Stadium	Neutral	1–0	Frank Acheampong		
7	30 May 2012	2012 Thai Premier League	New I-Mobile Stadium	Buriram United	1–1	Suriya Domtaisong – (red card) Jakkaphan Kaewprom	Jakkaphan Pornsai – (red card) Mario Gjurovski	
8	19 August 2012	2012 Thai Premier League	SCG Stadium	Muangthong United	1–1	Frank Acheampong	Mario Djurovski	
9	23 February 2013	2013 Kor Royal Cup	Supachalasai Stadium	Neutral	2–0	Ramsés Bustos	(red card) Mongkol Namnuad	
10	17 April 2013	2013 Thai Premier League	SCG Stadium	Muangthong United	1–2	Javier Patiño	Dagno Siaka	
11	11 August 2013	2013 Thai Premier League	New I-Mobile Stadium	Buriram United	1–1	Osmar Barba – (red card) Theerathon Bunmathan	Mario Djurovski	
12	23 September 2013	2013 Thai FA Cup - semi finals	Thammasat Stadium	Neutral	1–0	Manuel Redondo	(red card) Witsanusak Kaewruang	
13	1 February 2014	2014 Kor Royal Cup	Suphanburi Stadium	Neutral	1–0	Jay Simpson		
14	10 May 2014	2014 Thai Premier League	New I-Mobile Stadium	Buriram United	0–0	(red card) Theerathon Bunmathan		
15	18 June 2014	2014 Thai League Cup - QF Leg 1	New I-Mobile Stadium	Buriram United	0–0			
16	2 July 2014	2014 Thai League Cup - QF Leg 2	SCG Stadium	Muangthong United	0–1	Carmelo González		
17	20 August 2014	2014 Thai Premier League	SCG Stadium	Muangthong United	0–1	Andrés Túñez – (red card) Theerathon Bunmathan		
18	21 February 2015	2015 Thai Premier League	SCG Stadium	Muangthong United	1–1	Diogo	Mario Gjurovski	
19	1 August 2015	2015 Thai Premier League	New I-Mobile Stadium	Buriram United	2–2	Thitipan Puangchan (o.g.), Diogo	Mario Gjurovski, Cleiton Silva	
20	26 December 2015	2015 Thai FA Cup - final	Supachalasai Stadium	Neutral	3–1	Andrés Túñez, Go Seul-ki, Jakkaphan Kaewprom	Mario Gjurovski – (red card) Mario Gjurovski	
21	20 February 2016	2016 Kor Royal Cup	Supachalasai Stadium	Neutral	3–1	Diogo, Andrés Túñez, Jakkaphan Kaewprom	Adisak Kraisorn	
22	27 April 2016	2016 Thai League	New I-Mobile Stadium	Buriram United	0–3	(red card) Weslley	Cleiton Silva, Adisak Kraisorn	
23	24 July 2016	2016 Thai League	SCG Stadium	Muangthong United	3–2	Diogo, Anon Amornlerdsak	Chanathip Songkrasin, Sarach Yooyen, Cleiton Silva	
24	3 August 2016	2016 Thai FA Cup - third round	SCG Stadium	Muangthong United	3–1	Andrés Túñez – (red card) Bruno Moreira	Adisak Kraisorn, Teerasil Dangda, Cleiton Silva	
25	3 April 2017	2017 Thai League 1	New I-Mobile Stadium	Buriram United	2–0	Jajá, Suchao Nutnum	(red card) Célio Santos	
26	9 July 2017	2017 Thai League 1	SCG Stadium	Muangthong United	1–1	Rafael Bastos	Leandro Assumpção	
27	11 October 2017	2017 Thai League Cup - QF	New I-Mobile Stadium	Buriram United	0–2		Leandro Assumpção, Theerathon Bunmathan	
28	4 May 2018	2018 Thai League 1	Chang Arena	Buriram United	4–0	Yoo Jun-soo, Diogo, Korrakot Wiriyaudomsiri		
29	16 September 2018	2018 Thai League 1	SCG Stadium	Muangthong United	0–3	Korrakot Wiriyaudomsiri, Osvaldo, Yoo Jun-soo		
30	26 May 2019	2019 Thai League 1	Chang Arena	Buriram United	1–0	Sasalak Haiprakhon		
31	14 September 2019	2019 Thai League 1	SCG Stadium	Muangthong United	3–1	Suphanat Mueanta	Oh Ban-suk, Derley, Heberty	
32	31 October 2020	2020–21 Thai League 1	Chang Arena	Buriram United	2–3	Marko Šćepović, Apiwat Ngaolamhin	Lucas Rocha, Derley, Willian Popp	
33	6 March 2021	2020–21 Thai League 1	SCG Stadium	Muangthong United	2–2	Maicon, Piyaphon Phanichakul	Korawich Tasa, Suporn Peenagatapho	
34	3 April 2021	2020–21 Thai FA Cup - QF	Chang Arena	Buriram United	2–0	Samuel, Supachok Sarachat		
35	31 October 2021	2021–22 Thai League 1	Chang Arena	Buriram United	2–0	Samuel, Narubadin Weerawatnodom		
36	29 January 2022	2021–22 Thai League 1	Thunderdome Stadium	Muangthong United	0–1	Ratthanakorn Maikami		
37	11 September 2022	2022–23 Thai League 1	Chang Arena	Buriram United	1–1	Suphanat Mueanta	Sardor Mirzaev	
38	25 January 2023	2022–23 Thai League Cup - R16	Thunderdome Stadium	Muangthong United	1–2	Suphanat Mueanta, Lucas Rocha (o.g.)	Willian Popp	
39	12 February 2023	2022–23 Thai League 1	Thunderdome Stadium	Muangthong United	4–4	Suphanat Mueanta, Lonsana Doumbouya, Theerathon Bunmathan	Eric Johana Omondi, Poramet Arjvirai	
40	3 December 2023	2023–24 Thai League 1	Thunderdome Stadium	Muangthong United	2–2	Supachai Chaided, Goran Čaušić	Jaroensak Wonggorn, Stefan Šćepović	
41	27 April 2024	2023–24 Thai League 1	Chang Arena	Buriram United	3–1	Jefferson Tabinas, Supachai Chaided, Goran Čaušić	Kakana Khamyok	
42	22 May 2024	2023–24 Thai League Cup - semi final	BG Stadium	Neutral	0–2		Kakana Khamyok, Jaroensak Wonggorn	
43	22 December 2024	2024–25 Thai League 1	Chang Arena	Buriram United	1–0	Guilherme Bissoli	(red card) Theerapat Laohabut	
44	23 February 2025	2024–25 Thai League 1	BG Stadium	Muangthong United	1–3	Sasalak Haiprakhon, Hong Jeong-un (o.g.), Ratthanakorn Maikami	Guilherme Bissoli (o.g.)	
45	24 May 2025	2024–25 Thai FA Cup - final	Thammasat Stadium	Neutral	3–2	Guilherme Bissoli, Goran Čaušić	Poramet Arjvirai	
46	22 November 2025	2025–26 Thai League 1	Thammasat Stadium	Muangthong United	0–5	Robert Žulj, Guilherme Bissoli		
47	22 March 2026	2025–26 Thai League 1	Chang Arena	Buriram United	2–1	Thanakrit Chotmuangpak, Rubén Sánchez	Marko Šarić	

== Player records ==
=== All-time top scorers ===
As of 22 March 2026

Rank	Player	Club	Period	Goals
1	(Brazil) Diogo	Buriram United	2015–2018	6
2	(North Macedonia) Mario Gjurovski	Muangthong United	2012–2015, 2019	5
2	(Brazil) Cleiton Silva	Muangthong United	2014–2017	5
2	(Brazil) **Guilherme Bissoli**	Buriram United	2024–	5
5	(Venezuela) Andrés Túñez	Buriram United	2014–2020	4
5	(Thailand) **Suphanat Mueanta**	Buriram United	2018–	4
7	(Thailand) Adisak Kraisorn	Muangthong United	2016–2022	3
7	(Kenya) Eric Johana Omondi	Muangthong United	2022–2023	3
7	(Thailand) **Poramet Arjvirai**	Muangthong United	2017–	3
7	(Serbia) **Goran Čaušić**	Buriram United	2022–2024, 2024–	3
7	(Austria) **Robert Žulj**	Buriram United	2025–	3

Figures for active players (in bold) .

=== Players who played for both clubs ===
- sort by year of joining the second club.

Seq.	Player	Nation(s)	Joining second club	Direct transfer	Buriram United	Muangthong United
1	Suriya Domtaisong	(Thailand)	2009	✔	2009–2010, 2012–2013	2009
2	Ukrit Wongmeema	(Thailand)	2009	✔	2009–2011	2009
3	Salahudin Awae	(Thailand)	2010	✔	2010	2007–2009
4	Jakkaphan Kaewprom	(Thailand)	2011	✔	2011–2022	2010–2011
5	Umarin Yaodam	(Thailand)	2013		2005–2010	2012–2013
6	Chitchanok Xaysensourinthone	(Thailand)	2013		2012	2013
7	Naruphol Ar-romsawa	(Thailand)	2015		2015–2016	2010–2011
8	Prakit Deeprom	(Thailand)	2015		2015–2016	2007, 2017–2018
9	Adisak Kraisorn	(Thailand)	2011		2011–2014	2009, 2016–2019, 2021–2022
10	Charyl Chappuis	(Thailand) (Switzerland)	2017		2013–2014	2017–2019
11	Nukoolkit Krutyai	(Thailand)	2017		2015–2016	2017–2019
12	Jajá	(Brazil)	2018		2017	2018
13	Piyaphon Phanichakul	(Thailand)	2020		2020–2022	2010–2015
14	Aung Thu	(Myanmar)	2020		2020–2022	2019
15	Peeradon Chamratsamee	(Thailand)	2021		2021–2024	2015–2017
16	Theerathon Bunmathan	(Thailand)	2021	✔	2009–2016, 2021–	2016–2019
17	Suporn Peenagatapho	(Thailand)	2023	✔	2023–2024	2014–2016, 2018–2023
18	Sathaporn Daengsee	(Thailand)	2024		2016	2024
19	Phitiwat Sukjitthammakul	(Thailand)	2024		2024–	2015
20	Shinnaphat Leeaoh	(Thailand)	2025		2025–	2013–2016
21	Pathompol Charoenrattanapirom	(Thailand)	2025		2025–	2012–2016

=== Managed both clubs ===
Manager	Buriram United career						Muangthong United career					
Manager	Span	G	W	D	L	Win %	Span	G	W	D	L	Win %
(Thailand) Attaphol Buspakom	2010–2013	??	??	??	??	??	2009	??	??	??	??	??
(England) Scott Cooper	2013	26	18	6	2	69.23	2014	9	5	2	2	55.56
(Brazil) Alexandre Gama	2014–2016, 2020–2021	149	102	28	19	68.46	2019–2020	28	16	3	9	57.14
