= Dion Cools =

Malaysian footballer

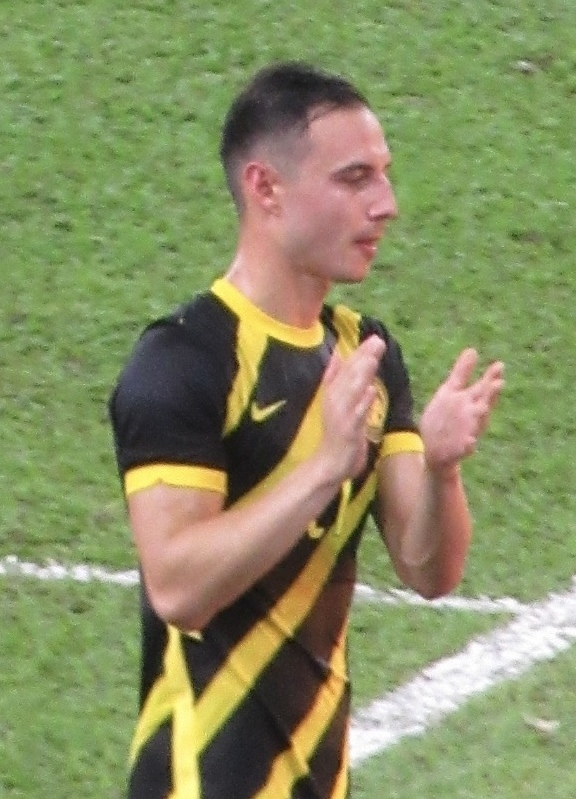
- Cools in 2022

Personal information
- Full name: Dion-Johan Chai Cools
- Date of birth: 4 June 1996 (age 30)
- Place of birth: Kuching, Malaysia
- Height: 1.85 m (6 ft 1 in)
- Positions: Full-back; centre-back

Team information
- Current team: Cerezo Osaka
- Number: 27

Youth career
- 2002–2005: Tempo Overijse
- 2005–2010: OH Leuven
- 2010–2011: Anderlecht
- 2011–2013: OH Leuven

Senior career*
Years	Team	Apps	(Gls)
2013–2015	OH Leuven	26	(0)
2015–2020	Club Brugge	81	(7)
2020–2022	Midtjylland	38	(1)
2022	→ Zulte Waregem (loan)	11	(0)
2022–2023	Jablonec	8	(0)
2023–2025	Buriram United	69	(4)
2025–	Cerezo Osaka	35	(2)

International career^{‡}
2014	Belgium U18	2	(0)
2014–2015	Belgium U19	8	(2)
2016–2019	Belgium U21	18	(4)
2021–	Malaysia	43	(6)
Medal record
Men's football
Representing Malaysia
FIFA ASEAN Cup
Third place	2026 Indonesia	Team
Merdeka Tournament
Winner	2024 Malaysia	Team
Runner-up	2023 Malaysia	Team
King's Cup
Runner-up	2022 Thailand	Team
- * Club domestic league appearances and goals as of 07:50, 21 January 2026 (UTC) ‡ National team caps and goals as of 17 November 2026

Dion-Johan Chai Cools (born 4 June 1996) is a Malaysian professional footballer who plays either as a full-back or centre-back for J.League club Cerezo Osaka and captains the Malaysia national team.

Cools was raised in Belgium, and represented that country at youth level with 28 caps, but later chose to play for his native Malaysia, and made his senior debut on 3 June 2021.

== Early life ==
Cools was born in Kuching, Sarawak to a Belgian father, Hans Cools and a Malaysian Chinese mother, Xylina Chai. The couple had relocated to Belgium following their marriage in the mid-1990s but were living there at the time of his birth. They traveled back to Kuching so his mother could be with her family during the delivery, and the family returned to Belgium shortly afterward. Dion was named by his parents after Johan Cruyff and Dion Dublin, the latter being a former player for Coventry City and Manchester United.

== Club career ==
=== Early years ===
Cools started his career with Tempo Overijse, but soon moved to OH Leuven as a 9-year-old. In 2010, he joined the Anderlecht youth team. After a season, he returned to the OH Leuven youth academy in 2013. He signed his first professional contract with the club in July 2014 after completing secondary school.

=== OH Leuven ===
On 3 August 2014, Cools made his debut in the first team of OH Leuven, competing in the Belgian Second Division. He was in the starting lineup for the away match against Racing Mechelen. In May 2015, he participated with OH Leuven in the final round for promotion. Cools did not miss a single minute of the final round and won promotion to the Belgian First Division A again with the club.

=== Club Brugge ===
On 23 June 2015, Cools signed a four-year contract with Club Brugge. He won two Belgian national titles and twice the Belgian Super Cup. Cools became a starter under head coach Michel Preud'homme in the 2016–17 season due to poor performances by former Dutch international Ricardo van Rhijn, who had initially become the starter after the departure of regular right-back Thomas Meunier to Paris-Saint Germain. Cools also remained a starter under new coach Ivan Leko, with whom he was reunited after his time with OH Leuven. Cools would, however, later become benched after the emergence of Clinton Mata at the position.

=== Midtjylland ===
On 31 January 2020, Cools signed a three-year contract with Midtjylland in the Danish Superliga. He made his debut for the club on 17 February in a 2–0 win over Lyngby. Cools scored his first goal for the club on 14 February 2021, the only goal of the match in a win over Horsens in the Superliga.

Initially, Cools played regularly under coach Brian Priske but suffered a foot injury that kept him out of action for three months. During his recovery, Priske left the club, and the incoming coach did not feature Cools as prominently in the team. Despite working to regain his position, another injury, this time to his pelvis, further disrupted his progress. Off the field, Cools faced challenges adapting to life in Denmark, citing a lack of social interactions and the country's long, wet winters as contributing factors.

Cools and FC Midtjylland have mutually agreed to cancel his contract with the club on 9 September 2022, making him a free agent.

==== Loan to Zulte Waregem ====
On 4 January 2022, Cools was loaned out to Zulte Waregem by Midtjylland until the end of the 2021–22 season as Cools was looking for more playing time, according to Midtjylland's director of football.

During his stint at this club, Cools playing time was inconsistent and he found integrating back into Belgian football challenging. He questioned whether his mindset was right for playing back home again, and he admitted to not playing with complete freedom. The team was also in a difficult period as they were fighting against relegation. Therefore, his performance and overall experience at Zulte Waregem were mixed.

=== FK Jablonec ===
On 12 September 2022, Cools signed for Czech Republic club, FK Jablonec on a short-term deal. He stated that the motivation behind the move is to get more playing time as his former club, Midtjylland, decided to switch to a different playing system, which curtailed his playing time.

=== Buriram United ===
On 3 January 2023, Cools signed a one-and-a-half-year contract with Buriram United in the Thai League 1 on a free transfer. He made his debut for the club on 22 January in a 3–0 win over Sukhothai after he was selected to be in the starting eleven against the club and played full 90 minutes of the match. On the 22nd of April, Cools lifted the 2022–23 Thai League 1 title after securing a win 2–1 against Chiangrai United. In his first season, he helped the club to win the domestic treble winning the 2022–23 Thai League Cup and 2022–23 Thai FA Cup.

=== Cerezo Osaka ===
On 4 June 2025, Cools was signed by J League club Cerezo Osaka, becoming the first-ever Malaysian to play in the top division of Japanese football. He is only the fourth Malaysian to ever play in Japan, behind Luqman Hakim Shamsudin, Hadi Fayyadh, and Wan Zack Haikal, all of whom played in the lower divisions. On 8 February, during the Osaka derby, Cools converted his penalty in the shootout; however, Cerezo ultimately lost after the match was decided on penalties. Under the special 100th-year J League format, a penalty shootout was mandated if the score remained level after 90 minutes.

== International career ==
Having lived in Belgium to a Belgian father and Malaysian mother, he was eligible to represent either Belgium or Malaysia. Additionally, due to her mother's ancestry which can be traced to Guangdong, China, at one time, Cools was in discussions with Jiangsu Suning about the possibility of naturalizing to play for the China national team. However, the complex nature of the naturalization process led to the abandonment of those discussions.

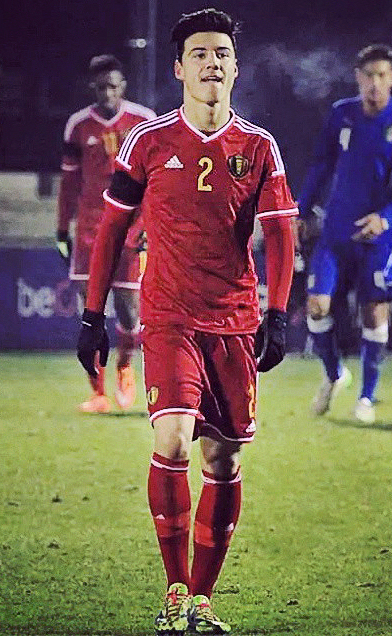
Cools playing for Belgium U19 in 2015

=== Youth ===
Cools was called up for 2015 UEFA European Under-19 Championship qualification by the Belgian under-19 national team coach, Gert Verheyen.

=== Senior ===
On 1 June 2021, Cools was announced as the newest addition to Malaysia's 26-man squad for the 2022 FIFA World Cup and 2023 AFC Asian Cup qualifiers match against UAE, after paperwork for his eligibility was completed with FIFA and the AFC. He debuted for Malaysia in a 4–0 loss to the UAE on 3 June 2021.

Cools scored his first international goal in Malaysia's final AFC 2023 Asian Cup qualifiers match against Bangladesh, helping Malaysia secure a 4–1 win, which confirmed Malaysia's AFC Asian Cup qualification for the first time by merit in 42 years. Cools was named as the 'Man of the Match'. Cools also represent the nation at the 2023 AFC Asian Cup where he captained them.

On 16 November 2023 during the 2026 FIFA World Cup qualification match against Kyrgyzstan, Cools scored the opening goal and the equalising goal when Malaysia were 3–1 down to level the score at 3–3, eventually helping them to a 4–3 comeback win.

== Personal life ==
Cools is married to Melissa Schelfhout, whom he wed in a civil ceremony on 6 May 2022. They have two children: a son, Liam-Zayn (born May 2021), and a daughter, Lina-Sophia (born 20 August 2024).

Cools has stated that his footballing idol is Club Brugge legend, Gert Verheyen.

== Career statistics ==
=== Club ===
As of match played 12 May 2024

Appearances and goals by club, season and competition
Club	Season	League			Cup		Continental		Other		Total	
Club	Season	Division	Apps	Goals	Apps	Goals	Apps	Goals	Apps	Goals	Apps	Goals
OH Leuven	2014–15	Belgian Second Division	26	0	1	1	—		6 (Note: Appearances in the Second Division play-offs)	0	33	1
Club Brugge	2015–16	Belgian Pro League	5	0	3	0	4 (Note: Appearances in the Champions League)	1	0	0	12	1
Club Brugge	2016–17	First Division A	24	3	2	0	3	0	1 (Note: Appearance in the Belgian Super Cup)	0	30	3
Club Brugge	2017–18	First Division A	35	3	5	0	1	0	0	0	41	3
Club Brugge	2018–19	First Division A	15	1	1	0	3	0	1	0	20	1
Club Brugge	2019–20	First Division A	2	0	0	0	1	0	0	0	3	0
Club Brugge	Total		81	7	11	0	12	1	2	0	106	8
Midtjylland	2019–20	Danish Superliga	5	0	—		—		—		5	0
Midtjylland	2020–21	Danish Superliga	21	1	2	0	3	0	—		26	1
Midtjylland	2021–22	Danish Superliga	12	0	3	0	3	0	—		18	0
Midtjylland	Total		38	1	5	0	6	0	—		49	1
Zulte Waregem (loan)	2021–22	First Division A	11	0	0	0	—		—		11	0
Jablonec	2022–23	Czech First League	8	0	1	1	—		—		9	1
Buriram United	2022–23	Thai League 1	14	0	2	0	0	0	4	0	20	0
Buriram United	2023–24	Thai League 1	28	2	2	0	0	0	1	0	31	2
Career total			206	10	22	2	18	1	13	0	258	13

=== International ===
As of match played 6 October 2026

Appearances and goals by national team and year
National team	Year	Apps	Goals
Malaysia	2021	4	0
Malaysia	2022	9	1
Malaysia	2023	5	3
Malaysia	2024	13	0
Malaysia	2025	7	2
Malaysia	2026	3	0
Total		41	6

Scores and results list Malaysia's goal tally first, score column indicates score after each Cools goal.

List of international goals scored by Dion Cools
No.	Date	Venue	Opponent	Score	Result	Competition
1	14 June 2022	Bukit Jalil National Stadium, Kuala Lumpur, Malaysia	Bangladesh	2–1	4–1	2023 AFC Asian Cup qualification
2	13 October 2023	Bukit Jalil National Stadium, Kuala Lumpur, Malaysia	India	1–0	4–2	2023 Merdeka Tournament
3	16 November 2023	Bukit Jalil National Stadium, Kuala Lumpur, Malaysia	Kyrgyzstan	1–0	4–3	2026 FIFA World Cup qualification
4	16 November 2023	Bukit Jalil National Stadium, Kuala Lumpur, Malaysia	Kyrgyzstan	3–3	4–3	2026 FIFA World Cup qualification
5	10 June 2025	Bukit Jalil National Stadium, Kuala Lumpur, Malaysia	Vietnam	4–0	0–3	2027 AFC Asian Cup qualification
6	9 October 2025	New Laos National Stadium, Vientiane, Laos	Laos	2–0	3–0	2027 AFC Asian Cup qualification

== Honours ==
OH Leuven

- Belgian Second Division play-offs: 2015

Club Brugge

- Belgian First Division A: 2015–16, 2017–18
- Belgian Super Cup: 2016, 2018

Midtjylland

- Danish Superliga: 2019–20

Buriram United

- Thai League 1: 2022–23, 2023–24, 2024–25
- Thai League Cup: 2022–23, 2024–25
- Thai FA Cup: 2022–23, 2024–25
- ASEAN Club Championship: 2024–25
- Thailand Champions Cup runner-up: 2023

Malaysia

- King's Cup runner-up: 2022
- Pestabola Merdeka: 2024; runner-up 2023

Individual

- Thai League Dream ASEAN XI
- Thai League Best XI: 2023–24
