= 2022–23 Thai League 1 =

Season of association football league

Thai League 1
- Season: 2022–23
- Dates: 12 August 2022 – 12 May 2023
- Champions: Buriram United; 9th Thai League 1 title
- Relegated: Nakhon Ratchasima; Nongbua Pitchaya; Lampang
- 2023–24 AFC Champions League: Bangkok United; BG Pathum United; Buriram United; Port
- Matches: 240
- Goals: 637 (2.65 per match)
- Top goalscorer: Supachai Chaided (19 goals)
- Biggest home win: 5 goals difference Buriram United 6–1 Sukhothai (19 August 2022); Muangthong United 5–0 PT Prachuap (23 October 2022)
- Biggest away win: 5 goals difference Lampang 0–5 Bangkok United (27 August 2022); Lamphun Warriors 0–5 Muangthong United (30 October 2022)
- Highest scoring: 8 goals total Chonburi 5–3 Police Tero (22 January 2023); Muangthong United 4–4 Buriram United (12 February 2023)
- Longest winning run: 8 matches Buriram United; Muangthong United
- Longest unbeaten run: 24 matches Buriram United
- Longest winless run: 12 matches Lampang
- Longest losing run: 5 matches Lampang; Nongbua Pitchaya
- Highest attendance: 29,461; Buriram United 2–3 Port (30 April 2023)
- Lowest attendance: 595; Bangkok United 4–1 Police Tero (23 April 2023)
- Total attendance: 1,063,328
- Average attendance: 4,431
- All statistics correct as of 12 May 2023.

The 2022–23 Thai League 1 is the 26th season of the Thai League 1, the top Thai professional league for association football clubs, since its establishment in 1996, also known as Hilux Revo Thai League due to the sponsorship deal with Toyota Motor Thailand. A total of 16 teams will compete in the league. The season began on 12 August 2022 and is scheduled to conclude on 12 May 2023.

The 1st transfer window is from 25 May to 9 August 2022 while the 2nd transfer window is from 19 December 2022 to 17 January 2023.

Buriram United are the defending champions, while Lamphun Warriors, Sukhothai and play-off winner Lampang have entered as the promoted teams from the 2021–22 Thai League 2.

== Changes from last season ==
=== Team changes ===
==== Promoted clubs ====
Promoted from the 2021–22 Thai League 2

- Lamphun Warriors
- Sukhothai
- Lampang (Play-off winner 2021–22 Thai League 2)

==== Relegated clubs ====
Relegated from the 2021–22 Thai League 1

- Samut Prakan City
- Suphanburi
- Chiangmai United

== Teams ==
Locations of the 2021–22 Thai League teams
Football clubs in the Bangkok Metropolitan Region

There are 16 clubs in the league, with three promoted teams from Thai League 2 replacing the three teams that were relegated from the 2021-22 season.

Samut Prakan City, Suphanburi and Chiangmai United were relegated at the end of the 2021–22 season after finishing in the bottom three places of the table. Chiangmai United made their immediate return to the second-tier, while Suphanburi ended a 9-year stint in the top-flight. Samut Prakan City, on the other hand, experienced their first-ever relegation as their current incarnation, having last experienced the drop back in 2013 when they were still known as Pattaya United. The three were replaced by 2021-22 Thai League 2 champions Lamphun Warriors, who are making their maiden appearance in the top flight. They were joined by runners-up Sukhothai, who made their immediate return to the top flight and Lampang, the promotion playoff winner which was first held in 2020–21 season. Like Lamphun, Lampang are making their top-flight debut this season.

== Stadium and locations ==
Note: Table lists in alphabetical order.

Team	Province	Stadium	Capacity
Bangkok United	Pathum Thani	Thammasat Stadium	19,375
BG Pathum United	Pathum Thani	BG Stadium	10,114
Buriram United	Buriram	Chang Arena	32,600
Chiangrai United	Chiang Rai	Leo Chiangrai Stadium	13,000
Chonburi	Chonburi	Chonburi Stadium	8,680
Khonkaen United	Khon Kaen	Khonkaen PAO. Stadium	7,000
Lampang	Lampang	Lampang Provincial Stadium	5,500
Lamphun Warriors	Lamphun	700th Anniversary Stadium	25,000
Muangthong United	Nonthaburi	Thunderdome Stadium	12,505
Nakhon Ratchasima	Nakhon Ratchasima	80th Birthday Stadium	24,641
Nongbua Pitchaya	Nongbua Lamphu	Pitchaya Stadium	6,000
Police Tero	Bangkok	Boonyachinda Stadium	3,550
Port	Bangkok	PAT Stadium	6,000
PT Prachuap	Prachuap Khiri Khan	Sam Ao Stadium	5,000
Ratchaburi	Ratchaburi	Dragon Solar Park	10,000
Sukhothai	Sukhothai	Thung Thalay Luang Stadium	8,000

== Personnel and sponsoring ==
Note: Flags indicate national team as has been defined under FIFA eligibility rules. Players may hold more than one non-FIFA nationality.

Team	Manager	Captain	Kit manufacturer	Shirt sponsors
Bangkok United	(Thailand) Totchtawan Sripan (interim)	(Brazil) Everton	Ari	True; Huawei; Daikin; CP; Smart Heart; Toyota; Ziebart; Euro Cake
BG Pathum United	(Thailand) Thongchai Sukkoki	(Thailand) Sarach Yooyen	Warrix	Leo; Euro Cake; Mitsubishi Electric; Gomuc; Muangthai; Yanmar
Buriram United	(Japan) Masatada Ishii	(Thailand) Narubadin Weerawatnodom	Made by club (Domestic); Ari (Asia)	Chang; Grab; Rabbit; Coca-Cola; Muang Thai Insurance; King Power; Yamaha; Thai AirAsia; TrueVisions; CP; Amari Hotel; Jele
Chiangrai United	(Brazil) Gabriel Magalhães	(Thailand) Sivakorn Tiatrakul	Grand Sport	Leo; Thai Vietjet Air; TOA
Chonburi	(Thailand) Adul Lahsoh (interim)	(Thailand) Kritsada Kaman	Nike	Chang; Euro Cake
Khonkaen United	(Thailand) Patipat Robroo	(Brazil) Ibson Melo	Kappa	Leo; Krungthai-AXA
Lampang	(Thailand) Sukrit Yothee	(Thailand) Wichit Thanee	Ego Sport	Pitchaya Bangkok Airways
Lamphun Warriors	(Brazil) Alexandre Gama	(Thailand) Sarawut Inpaen	2S Sport (1st half); Warrix (2nd half)	Betagro; Chang
Muangthong United	(North Macedonia) Mario Gjurovski	(Thailand) Suporn Peenagatapho	Shoot (Local Brand)	Yamaha; Coca-Cola; AIA; Herbalife Nutrition; I-Mobile; Gulf; Sharp Corporation
Nakhon Ratchasima	(Thailand) Teerasak Po-on	(England) Charlie Clough	Infinite	Mazda; Leo; CP; Central Plaza; Gulf
Nongbua Pitchaya	(Thailand) Theerawekin Seehawong (Interim)	(Brazil) Barros Tardeli	Warrix	Pitchaya; Thai-Denmark
Police Tero	(Thailand) Rangsan Viwatchaichok	(Ghana) Isaac Honny	FBT	Chang; CP; Channel 3
Port	(Thailand) Choketawee Promrut (Thailand) Surapong Kongthep	(Thailand) Tanaboon Kesarat	Ari	Muang Thai Insurance; AirAsia; CP; Thai AirAsia; Thai Union
PT Prachuap	(Thailand) Dusit Chalermsan	(Thailand) Nattapon Malapun	Grand Sport	PTG Energy; Euro Cake; 2Gear
Ratchaburi	(Brazil) Douglas Cardozo	(Thailand) Jakkaphan Kaewprom	Shoot (Local Brand)	Chang; Dragon Solar Roof; Master Vet; Oxygen Booster; Euro Cake; WoW FItness; Thitikal Ambulance; Kanchana Fresh Meat
Sukhothai	(Thailand) Laksana Kamruen (interim)	(Thailand) Sila Srikampang	Pan	Chang; Carabao; CP

=== Managerial changes ===
Team	Outgoing manager	Manner of departure	Date of vacancy	Week	Table	Incoming manager	Date of appointment
Lamphun Warriors	(Brazil) Wanderley Junior	Redesignated	20 May 2022	Pre-season		(Thailand) Dusit Chalermsan	20 May 2022
PT Prachuap	(Thailand) Issara Sritaro	End of contract	15 June 2022	Pre-season		(Thailand) Teerasak Po-on	15 June 2022
Port	(Thailand) Jadet Meelarp	Redesignated	28 June 2022	Pre-season		(England) Scott Cooper	28 June 2022
Ratchaburi	(Portugal) Bruno Pereira	End of contract	4 July 2022	Pre-season		(Spain) Xavi Moro	4 July 2022
BG Pathum United	(Japan) Makoto Teguramori	Sacked	24 October 2022	10th	7th	(Japan) Mitsuo Kato (interim)	24 October 2022
BG Pathum United	(Japan) Mitsuo Kato	End of interim spell	29 October 2022	11th	7th	(Australia) Matt Smith	29 October 2022
Khon Kaen United	(Brazil) Carlos Eduardo Parreira	Sacked	29 October 2022	11th	14th	(Thailand) Pairoj Borwonwatanadilok	2 November 2022
Nongbua Pitchaya	(Thailand) Thawatchai Damrong-Ongtrakul	Resigned	2 November 2022	11th	16th	(Thailand) Theerawesin Seehawong (interim)	2 November 2022
Lamphun Warriors	(Thailand) Dusit Chalermsan	Resigned	7 November 2022	12th	16th	(Thailand) Jongsarit Wutchuay (interim)	7 November 2022
PT Prachuap	(Thailand) Teerasak Po-on	Resigned	11 November 2022	13th	12th	(Thailand) Dusit Chalermsan	14 November 2022
Port	(England) Scott Cooper	Sacked	14 November 2022	13th	5th	(Wales) Matthew Mark Holland (interim)	14 November 2022
Lamphun Warriors	(Thailand) Jongsarit Wutchuay	End of interim spell	17 November 2022	13th	16th	(Brazil) Alexandre Gama	17 November 2022
Khon Kaen United	(Thailand) Pairoj Borwonwatanadilok	Mutual consent	28 November 2022	15th	14th	(Thailand) Patipat Robroo	4 December 2022
Chiangrai United	(Brazil) Emerson	End of contract	7 December 2022	15th	6th	(Brazil) Gabriel Magalhães	2 January 2023
Nongbua Pitchaya	(Thailand) Theerawesin Seehawong	End of interim spell	8 November 2022	15th	15th	(Brazil) Emerson	8 December 2022
Bangkok United	(Australia) Aurelio Vidmar	Resigned	28 December 2022	Mid-season	4th	(Thailand) Totchtawan Sripan (interim)	28 December 2022
Port	(Wales) Matthew Mark Holland	End of interim spell	5 February 2023	18th	6th	(Thailand) Choketawee Promrut (Thailand) Surapong Kongthep	5 February 2023
Nakhon Ratchasima	(England) Kevin Blackwell	Sacked	5 February 2023	18th	13th	(Thailand) Teerasak Po-on	5 February 2023
Nongbua Pitchaya	(Brazil) Emerson	Sacked	22 February 2023	20th	16th	(Thailand) Theerawekin Seehawong (Interim)	23 February 2023
Sukhothai	(Germany) Dennis Amato	Mutual Consent	15 March 2023	23rd	11th	(Thailand) Laksana Kamruen (interim)	16 March 2023
BG Pathum United	(Australia) Matt Smith	Sacked	19 March 2023	24th	9th	(Thailand) Supachai Komsilp (interim)	19 March 2023
Chonburi	(Thailand) Sasom Pobprasert	Resigned	10 April 2023	26th	7th	(Thailand) Adul Lahsoh (interim)	10 April 2023
Ratchaburi	(Spain) Xavi Moro	End of contract	11 May 2023	29th	7th	(Brazil) Douglas Cardozo	11 May 2023

== Foreign players ==
The FIFA Transfer Window Period for Thailand was 25 May to 9 August 2022.

Club	Player 1	Player 2	Player 3	Player 4	Player 5	AFC Player	ASEAN Player 1	ASEAN Player 2	ASEAN Player 3	Former
Bangkok United	(Brazil) Everton	(Brazil) Vander	(Brazil) Willen	(Brazil) Heberty		(Palestine) Mahmoud Eid	(Philippines) Michael Falkesgaard			
BG Pathum United	(Brazil) Cássio Scheid	(Brazil) Stênio Júnior	(Venezuela) Andrés Túñez	(Israel) Ben Azubel		(Japan) Yusuke Maruhashi	(Singapore) Irfan Fandi	(Singapore) Ikhsan Fandi		(Brazil) Diogo (Israel) Lidor Cohen (Brazil) Conrado (Philippines) Jesse Curran
Buriram United	(Serbia) Goran Čaušić	(Slovenia) Haris Vučkić	(Sweden) Filip Rogić	(Guinea) Lonsana Doumbouya	(Democratic Republic of the Congo) Jonathan Bolingi	(Iraq) Rebin Sulaka	(Malaysia) Dion Cools			(Kenya) Ayub Masika (Philippines) Diego Bardanca (Myanmar) Aung Thu (Colombia) Frank Castañeda
Chiangrai United	(Brazil) Diego Landis	(Brazil) Victor Cardozo	(Brazil) Felipe Amorim	(El Salvador) Nelson Bonilla	(Japan) Ryuji Hirota	(South Korea) Kim Ji-min				(Brazil) Olávio
Chonburi	(Brazil) Danilo Alves	(Brazil) Dennis Murillo	(Croatia) Renato Kelić	(Ivory Coast) Amadou Ouattara	(South Korea) Go Seul-ki	(South Korea) Yoo Byung-soo	(Philippines) Jesse Curran	(Philippines) Diego Bardanca	(Brunei) Faiq Bolkiah	(Myanmar) Zaw Min Tun
Khonkaen United	(Brazil) Alef	(Brazil) Ibson Melo	(Brazil) Índio	(Israel) Lidor Cohen	(Spain) Youssef Ezzejjari	(South Korea) Jung Han-cheol	(Philippines) Joshua Grommen			(Brazil) Rômulo (Malaysia) Liridon Krasniqi
Lampang	(Brazil) Jorge Fellipe	(Brazil) Mosquito	(Croatia) Josip Ivančić	(Australia) Brandon Wilson		(Japan) Yuki Bamba				(Brazil) Andrey Coutinho (Brazil) Brinner (Brazil) Deyvison
Lamphun Warriors	(Brazil) Lucca	(Brazil) Bill	(Brazil) Luiz Antônio	(Venezuela) Jeffrén Suárez	(France) Aly Cissokho	(Syria) Mohammed Osman	(Philippines) Kike Linares	(Myanmar) Maung Maung Lwin	(Myanmar) Aung Thu	(Brazil) Thales Lima (Serbia) Ognjen Mudrinski (Philippines) Iain Ramsay
Muangthong United	(Brazil) Willian Popp	(Brazil) Lucas Rocha	(Estonia) Henri Anier	(Kenya) Eric Johana Omondi		(Uzbekistan) Sardor Mirzaev	(Philippines) Jesper Nyholm			(South Korea) Hong Sung-wook
Nakhon Ratchasima	(England) Charlie Clough	(England) Morgan Ferrier	(Spain) Tyronne	(Brazil) Crislan		(Australia) Jordan Murray	(Philippines) Dylan De Bruycker	(Philippines) Amani Aguinaldo	(Philippines) Dennis Villanueva	
Nongbua Pitchaya	(Brazil) Tardeli	(Brazil) Léo	(Cape Verde) Alvin Fortes	(South Korea) Jeong Ho-min		(Palestine) Islam Batran	(Singapore) Song Ui-young			(Brazil) Jorge Fellipe (Brazil) Jonatan Reis
Port	(Brazil) Airton	(Brazil) Hamilton	(Brazil) Negueba	(Spain) David Rochela	(Spain) Sergio Suárez	(Iraq) Frans Putros	(Philippines) Martin Steuble			
PT Prachuap	(Brazil) Brenner	(Brazil) Samuel	(Slovenia) Aris Zarifović	(Ivory Coast) Lossémy Karaboué	(Nigeria) Ibrahim Tomiwa	(South Korea) Kwon Dae-hee	(Malaysia) Junior Eldstål			(Brazil) Maurinho (Philippines) Patrick Reichelt (Philippines) Patrick Deyto (Philippines) Dennis Villanueva
Police Tero	(Brazil) Rômulo	(Ghana) Isaac Honny	(Ghana) Lesley Ablorh	(Ivory Coast) Marc Landry Babo	(South Korea) Lim Jae-hyeok	(South Korea) Jeong Woo-geun				(Brazil) Danilo Oliveira (Nigeria) Raphael Success
Ratchaburi	(Brazil) Derley	(Brazil) Rafael Jansen	(Brazil) Douglas	(Mali) Moussa Sidibé	(Togo) Serge Nyuiadzi	(South Korea) Park Jun-heong	(Myanmar) Myo Min Latt	(Myanmar) Hein Phyo Win	(Malaysia) Safawi Rasid	(Philippines) Adam Reed (Cape Verde) Alvin Fortes (Guinea-Bissau) Romário Baldé
Sukhothai	(Brazil) Laércio Soldá	(Madagascar) John Baggio	(Sweden) Osman Sow			(Japan) Ryohei Arai	(Philippines) Kenshiro Daniels			(El Salvador) Léster Blanco (Sweden) Admir Bajrovic

=== Dual citizenship/heritage players ===
Overseas Thai players whom have obtained a Thai passport are regarded as local players.

Club	Player 1	Player 2	Player 3	Player 4	Player 5	Player 6
Bangkok United	(Germany) (Thailand) Manuel Bihr^{2} ^{3}					
BG Pathum United	(Laos) (Thailand) Surachat Sareepim^{2} ^{3}	(Spain) (Thailand) Ernesto Phumipha^{2} ^{3}	(Sweden) (Thailand) Patrik Gustavsson^{2}			
Buriram United						
Chiangrai United	(Italy) (Thailand) Marco Ballini^{2}	(Italy) (Thailand) Gionata Verzura^{2}				
Chonburi	(Sweden) (Thailand) Anthonio Sanjairag^{2}					
Khonkaen United						
Lampang						
Lamphun Warriors	(France) (Thailand) Nont Muangngam^{2}	(Wales) (Thailand) Mika Chunuonsee^{2} ^{3}				
Muangthong United	(Netherlands) (Thailand) Ronan Pluijnen^{2}					
Nakhon Ratchasima	(Sweden) (Thailand) Oliver Granberg^{2}					
Nongbua Pitchaya	(England) (Thailand) Leon James^{2}	(Sweden) (Thailand) Niran Hansson^{2}				
Police Tero	(England) (Thailand) Siam Yapp^{2}	(Switzerland) (Thailand) Denis Darbellay^{2}	(Australia) (Thailand) Maxx Creevey^{2}			
Port	(Switzerland) (Thailand) Charyl Chappuis^{2} ^{3}	(Sweden) (Thailand) Elias Dolah^{2} ^{3}	(Germany) (Thailand) Philip Roller^{2} ^{3}	(Sweden) (Thailand) Kevin Deeromram^{2} ^{3}	(Sweden) (Thailand) William Weidersjö^{2}	(Singapore) (England) (Thailand) Ben Davis^{2}
PT Prachuap	(France) (Thailand) Chakkit Laptrakul^{2}					
Ratchaburi	(Denmark) (Thailand) Jonathan Khemdee					
Sukhothai	(Germany) (Thailand) Maximilian Steinbauer^{2}					

Notes:

^2 Carrying Thai heritage.
^3 Capped for Thailand.

== League table ==
Pos	Team	Pld	W	D	L	GF	GA	GD	Pts	Qualification
1	Buriram United (Note: As 2021–22 Thai League 1 winners) (C, Q)	30	23	5	2	75	27	+48	74	Qualification for 2023–24 AFC Champions League group stage
2	Bangkok United (Q)	30	19	5	6	55	22	+33	62	Qualification for 2023–24 AFC Champions League group stage
3	Port (Q)	30	14	10	6	52	38	+14	52	Qualification for 2023–24 AFC Champions League qualifying play-offs
4	Muangthong United	30	14	8	8	56	37	+19	50	
5	Chiangrai United	30	12	8	10	44	42	+2	44	
6	Chonburi	30	13	4	13	46	38	+8	43 (Note: Chonburi ahead on head-to-head points record; Chonburi 6 pts, Police Tero 0 pt.)	
7	Police Tero	30	11	10	9	41	43	−2	43	
8	Ratchaburi	30	10	11	9	32	29	+3	41 (Note: Ratchaburi ahead on head-to-head goals difference; Ratchaburi 3–0 BG Pathum United, BG Pathum United 4–2 Ratchaburi.)	
9	BG Pathum United (Note: As 2021–22 Thai League 1 runners-up) (Q)	30	12	5	13	42	39	+3	41	Qualification for 2023–24 AFC Champions League qualifying play-offs
10	Lamphun Warriors	30	9	9	12	27	36	−9	36	
11	PT Prachuap	30	9	8	13	44	51	−7	35	
12	Sukhothai	30	8	10	12	27	43	−16	34	
13	Khonkaen United	30	7	12	11	24	42	−18	33	
14	Nakhon Ratchasima (R)	30	7	8	15	31	53	−22	29	Relegation to Thai League 2
15	Nongbua Pitchaya (R)	30	5	6	19	27	47	−20	21	Relegation to Thai League 2
16	Lampang (R)	30	4	7	19	24	60	−36	19	Relegation to Thai League 2

Updated to match(es) played on 12 May 2023. Source: Thai League
Rules for classification: 1) Points; 2) Head-to-head points; 3) Head-to-head goals difference; 4) Head-to-head goals scored; 5) Overall goals difference; 6) Overall goals scored; 7) Fair play points; 8) Play-off without extra time;).
(C) Champions; (Q) Qualified for the phase indicated; (R) Relegated

=== Positions by round ===
The table lists the positions of teams after each week of matches. In order to preserve chronological evolvements, any postponed matches are not included in the round at which they were originally scheduled, but added to the full round they were played immediately afterwards. For example, if a match is scheduled for matchday 13, but then postponed and played between days 16 and 17, it will be added to the standings for day 16.

Team ╲ Round	1	2	3	4	5	6	7	8	9	10	11	12	13	14	15	16	17	18	19	20	21	22	23	24	25	26	27	28	29	30
Buriram United	3	1	2	3	5	2	2	2	1	1	1	1	1	1	1	1	1	1	1	1	1	1	1	1	1	1	1	1	1	1
Bangkok United	2	2	1	1	1	3	4	3	3	2	2	2	3	4	4	3	2	2	2	2	2	2	2	2	2	2	2	2	2	2
Port	7	9	6	8	6	6	8	7	7	6	6	7	5	6	7	5	6	6	6	6	6	6	4	3	3	3	4	3	3	3
Muangthong United	12	10	10	7	9	10	10	11	12	10	9	9	10	11	10	9	9	9	9	9	7	7	5	4	4	4	3	4	4	4
Chiangrai United	4	4	3	5	3	4	5	6	6	5	5	6	7	5	6	7	5	5	5	4	4	5	7	7	7	6	7	6	5	5
Chonburi	10	7	5	4	4	1	1	1	2	3	3	3	2	3	2	2	3	3	3	3	3	3	3	6	6	7	6	5	6	6
Police Tero	14	14	15	15	14	15	15	13	11	8	8	8	8	8	8	8	8	8	7	8	9	8	9	8	8	9	9	9	8	7
Ratchaburi	6	3	4	2	2	5	3	4	4	4	4	4	4	2	3	4	4	4	4	5	5	4	6	5	5	5	5	7	7	8
BG Pathum United	9	12	14	12	7	7	6	5	5	7	7	5	6	7	5	6	7	7	8	7	8	9	8	9	9	8	8	8	9	9
Lamphun Warriors	8	11	11	13	15	14	14	16	16	14	15	16	16	14	12	14	14	14	13	13	12	14	14	13	14	13	14	12	11	10
PT Prachuap	1	6	9	6	10	9	9	10	9	11	11	12	12	12	13	12	12	12	12	12	13	12	13	14	13	11	11	11	12	11
Sukhothai	16	16	13	14	13	12	11	9	10	12	12	10	9	9	9	10	10	10	11	10	10	10	11	12	10	10	10	10	10	12
Khonkaen United	15	15	12	10	11	11	12	14	14	15	14	13	13	13	14	13	11	11	10	11	11	11	10	11	12	14	13	14	13	13
Nakhon Ratchasima	11	8	7	9	8	8	7	8	8	9	10	11	11	10	11	11	13	13	14	14	14	13	12	10	11	12	12	13	14	14
Nongbua Pitchaya	13	13	16	16	16	16	16	15	15	16	16	15	14	15	15	15	15	15	15	16	16	15	15	15	15	15	15	15	16	15
Lampang	5	5	8	11	12	13	13	12	13	13	13	14	15	16	16	16	16	16	16	15	15	16	16	16	16	16	16	16	15	16

Leader and qualification to the 2023–24 AFC Champions League group stage
Relegation to the 2023–24 Thai League 2

Source: Thai League

=== Results by match played ===
Team ╲ Round	1	2	3	4	5	6	7	8	9	10	11	12	13	14	15	16	17	18	19	20	21	22	23	24	25	26	27	28	29	30
Bangkok United	W	W	W	W	D	D	W	W	L	W	L	W	L	D	D	W	W	W	W	W	L	W	W	W	W	L	W	L	W	D
BG Pathum United	L	D	W	W	D	W	L	W	W	L	D	W	L	L	W	L	D	L	L	W	L	L	D	L	W	W	L	W	L	W
Buriram United	W	W	W	D	D	W	W	W	W	D	W	W	W	W	W	W	W	W	D	W	W	W	W	W	L	W	W	L	D	W
Chiangrai United	W	W	W	L	W	D	D	L	D	W	D	D	L	W	L	D	W	W	D	W	L	L	D	L	L	W	L	W	W	L
Chonburi	W	L	W	W	W	W	W	W	L	D	D	D	W	L	W	W	L	W	L	L	L	D	L	L	L	L	W	W	L	L
Khonkaen United	L	L	D	W	L	D	L	L	L	D	D	D	D	D	D	W	W	D	W	L	W	D	D	L	L	L	W	L	W	D
Muangthong United	L	D	D	W	D	L	L	D	L	W	W	D	D	L	D	W	W	L	D	W	W	W	W	W	W	W	W	L	L	W
Nakhon Ratchasima	L	W	D	L	W	D	W	L	D	L	D	L	L	W	L	L	L	L	D	D	L	W	W	W	D	L	D	L	L	L
Nongbua Pitchaya	L	L	L	L	L	D	L	W	L	L	L	W	D	D	D	L	L	L	D	L	W	W	L	L	L	L	L	D	L	W
Police Tero	L	L	D	L	D	D	W	L	W	W	W	L	W	D	W	L	D	D	W	L	D	D	L	D	W	D	L	W	W	W
Port	D	W	W	L	D	D	D	D	W	W	D	D	W	L	L	W	D	D	L	W	W	L	W	W	W	W	D	W	W	L
PT Prachuap	W	L	L	W	L	D	L	L	W	L	D	L	L	D	D	W	D	L	W	L	L	D	D	L	W	W	D	W	L	W
Ratchaburi	W	W	W	W	D	W	L	D	W	D	D	D	W	W	L	L	D	W	L	L	L	D	D	W	D	L	D	L	D	L
Lamphun Warriors	D	L	L	L	L	D	D	L	L	W	L	L	D	W	W	D	D	L	W	D	D	L	D	W	L	W	L	W	W	W
Sukhothai	L	L	D	L	D	W	D	W	D	L	D	W	W	D	L	L	L	W	L	D	W	D	L	L	W	D	W	D	L	L
Lampang	W	D	L	L	L	L	L	W	L	L	D	L	L	L	D	L	L	D	D	D	W	L	L	D	L	L	L	L	W	L

Source: Thai League
W = Win; D = Draw; L = Lose

== Results ==
Home \ Away	BKU	BGP	BRU	CRU	CBR	KKU	LAM	LWR	MTU	NRM	NON	PTR	POR	PTP	RBM	SUK
Bangkok United	—	2–0	4–3	4–2	3–1	2–0	1–0	2–0	2–0	3–0	3–1	4–1	1–2	1–1	0–1	3–0
BG Pathum United	0–1	—	0–2	3–1	1–0	2–0	2–2	1–0	3–0	5–2	1–3	3–1	4–2	2–1	4–2	0–1
Buriram United	1–0	2–2	—	4–1	2–0	4–1	2–0	2–0	1–1	4–0	3–1	3–0	2–3	3–1	1–0	6–1
Chiangrai United	1–2	2–1	1–2	—	1–1	3–1	5–1	1–1	3–1	1–0	2–0	1–0	2–3	3–2	0–0	1–1
Chonburi	0–1	1–0	2–3	1–3	—	2–2	4–0	2–0	0–1	2–1	2–1	5–3	1–0	1–0	1–2	1–1
Khonkaen United	1–1	0–0	1–1	0–0	0–3	—	1–0	1–0	1–1	3–2	2–1	0–0	1–0	0–3	0–2	2–1
Lampang	0–5	0–1	0–3	0–0	1–3	1–1	—	1–2	1–5	2–1	1–0	1–3	1–3	4–3	1–0	0–1
Lamphun Warriors	2–1	3–0	0–2	0–1	0–2	1–1	2–1	—	0–5	0–0	1–0	2–2	3–1	0–0	1–1	3–1
Muangthong United	1–1	1–0	4–4	1–2	1–5	2–0	2–2	3–1	—	3–0	3–1	1–0	0–0	5–0	4–0	2–0
Nakhon Ratchasima	0–4	0–4	1–2	3–1	1–0	1–0	3–0	2–2	1–1	—	2–1	1–3	1–1	1–2	1–1	1–1
Nongbua Pitchaya	0–1	1–0	0–1	1–2	2–1	1–1	1–0	0–1	2–2	1–1	—	1–2	0–0	3–1	0–2	1–1
Police Tero	1–0	0–0	1–4	2–1	0–2	3–0	1–1	0–0	2–1	1–0	2–1	—	2–2	1–1	1–0	2–2
Port	1–1	2–1	1–3	1–1	3–1	4–1	2–1	0–0	2–3	2–0	2–1	2–2	—	5–2	1–0	2–0
PT Prachuap	2–1	2–2	0–1	2–1	3–1	1–1	1–1	1–0	0–1	0–1	5–1	2–4	1–2	—	1–5	2–0
Ratchaburi	0–1	3–0	1–1	1–1	1–1	0–2	1–0	1–0	1–0	1–1	2–1	1–1	1–1	1–1	—	1–1
Sukhothai	0–0	2–0	0–3	3–0	1–0	0–0	1–1	1–2	2–1	2–3	0–0	1–0	1–3	0–3	1–0	—

Updated to match(es) played on 12 May 2023. Source: Thai League
Legend: Blue = home team win; Yellow = draw; Red = away team win.

== Season statistics ==
=== Top scorers ===
As of 12 May 2023.

Rank	Player	Club	Goals
1	(Thailand) Supachai Chaided	Buriram United	19
2	(Brazil) Samuel	PT Prachuap	18
3	(Brazil) Hamilton Soares	Port	15
4	(Serbia) Goran Čaušić	Buriram United	14
4	(Brazil) Willian Popp	Muangthong United	14
6	(Brazil) Danilo Alves	Chonburi	13
7	(Brazil) Willen Mota	Bangkok United	12
7	(Guinea) Lonsana Doumbouya	Buriram United	12
9	(Brazil) Heberty	Bangkok United	11
9	(Thailand) Teerasil Dangda	BG Pathum United	11
9	(Brazil) Victor Cardozo	Chiangrai United	11
9	(Brazil) Barros Tardeli	Nongbua Pitchaya	11

=== Top assists ===
As of 12 May 2023.

Rank	Player	Club	Assists
1	(Thailand) Suphanat Mueanta	Buriram United	10
2	(Thailand) Narubadin Weerawatnodom	Buriram United	8
2	(Thailand) Theerathon Bunmathan	Buriram United	8
4	(Thailand) Pakorn Prempak	Port	7
4	(Brazil) Samuel	PT Prachuap	7
4	(Thailand) Jakkaphan Kaewprom	Ratchaburi	7
7	(Brazil) Vander Luiz	Bangkok United	6
7	(Thailand) Teerasil Dangda	BG Pathum United	6

=== Hat-tricks ===
Player	For	Against	Result	Date
(Kenya) Eric Johana Omondi	Muangthong United	Buriram United	4–4 (H)	12 February 2023
(Guinea) Lonsana Doumbouya	Buriram United	Khonkaen United	4–1 (H)	18 March 2023
(Brazil) Willen Mota	Bangkok United	Police Tero	4–1 (H)	23 April 2023
(Thailand) Chawin Thirawatsri	Lampang	PT Prachuap	4–3 (H)	6 May 2023
(Brazil) Willian Popp	Muangthong United	Ratchaburi	4–0 (H)	12 May 2023

=== Clean sheets ===
As of 12 May 2023.

Rank	Player	Club	Clean sheets
1	(Philippines) Michael Falkesgaard	Bangkok United	14
2	(Thailand) Kittipun Saensuk	Sukhothai	10
3	(Thailand) Kampol Pathomakkakul	Ratchaburi	8
4	(Thailand) Kittipong Phuthawchueak	BG Pathum United	7
4	(Thailand) Nopphon Lakhonphon	Buriram United	7
4	(Thailand) Patiwat Khammai	Muangthong United	7
4	(Thailand) Sinthaweechai Hathairattanakool	Police Tero	7
8	(Thailand) Siwarak Tedsungnoen	Buriram United	6
8	(Thailand) Nont Muangngam	Lamphun Warriors	6
8	(Thailand) Somporn Yos	Muangthong United / Port	6

== Awards ==
=== Monthly awards ===
Month	Coach of the Month		Player of the Month		Goal of the month		Reference
Month	Coach	Club	Player	Club	Player	Club	Reference
August	(Australia) Aurelio Vidmar	Bangkok United	(Brazil) Heberty	Bangkok United	(Thailand) Chawin Thirawatsri	Lampang	
September	(Thailand) Sasom Pobprasert	Chonburi	(Serbia) Goran Čaušić	Buriram United	(Thailand) Channarong Promsrikaew	Chonburi	
October	(Thailand) Rangsan Viwatchaichok	Police Tero	(Serbia) Goran Čaušić	Buriram United	(Thailand) Sarach Yooyen	BG Pathum United	
November	(Japan) Masatada Ishii	Buriram United	(Thailand) Sittichok Kannoo	Ratchaburi	(Brazil) Barros Tardeli	Nongbua Pitchaya	
January	(Japan) Masatada Ishii	Buriram United	(Brazil) Willian Popp	Muangthong United	(Thailand) Suporn Peenagatapho	Muangthong United	
February	(Japan) Masatada Ishii	Buriram United	(Thailand) Suphanat Mueanta	Buriram United	(Thailand) Suphanat Mueanta	Buriram United	
March	(Thailand) Teerasak Po-on	Nakhon Ratchasima	(England) Charlie Clough	Nakhon Ratchasima	(Thailand) Channarong Promsrikaew	Chonburi	
April	(Thailand) Dusit Chalermsan	PT Prachuap	(Thailand) Worachit Kanitsribampen	Port	(Brazil) Crislan	Nakhon Ratchasima	

== Attendances ==
=== Overall statistical table ===
Pos	Team	Total	High	Low	Average	Change
1	Buriram United	321,596	29,461	12,575	21,440	+99.5%
2	BG Pathum United	86,065	10,089	3,698	5,738	+83.6%
3	Muangthong United	75,515	10,487	2,345	5,034	+51.4%
4	Port	70,540	6,250	3,118	4,703	+209.0%
5	Khonkaen United	70,105	6,392	3,548	4,674	+60.5%
6	Chonburi	69,795	7,799	3,484	4,653	+57.6%
7	Nakhon Ratchasima	60,191	9,561	2,387	4,013	+69.9%
8	Ratchaburi	54,625	6,674	2,146	3,642	+100.4%
9	Sukhothai	52,594	7,998	1,680	3,506	+290.0%^{†}
10	Bangkok United	38,430	8,794	595	2,562	+78.5%
11	Nongbua Pitchaya	36,831	5,987	1,154	2,455	+31.5%
12	Chiangrai United	30,448	5,040	1,076	2,030	+97.5%
13	PT Prachuap	27,484	3,186	1,107	1,832	+201.3%
14	Lamphun Warriors	26,347	4,163	602	1,756	+62.3%^{†}
15	Lampang	22,115	3,147	671	1,474	+238.9%^{†}
16	Police Tero	20,647	2,375	829	1,376	+6.7%
	League total	1,063,328	29,461	595	4,431	+78.6%

Updated to games played on 12 May 2023
Source: Thai League
Notes:
^{†} Teams played previous season in Thai League 2

=== Attendances by home match played ===
Team \ Match played	1	2	3	4	5	6	7	8	9	10	11	12	13	14	15	Total
Bangkok United	2,058	2,420	1,807	2,711	4,312	1,307	1,311	1,144	1,091	1,199	3,594	2,404	8,794	595	3,683	34,747
BG Pathum United	5,559	6,470	10,034	5,323	5,669	5,476	4,452	5,372	10,089	4,145	3,698	5,058	4,373	4,775	5,572	86,065
Buriram United	12,575	21,648	25,943	14,190	15,788	22,353	16,623	19,813	26,207	22,995	21,697	21,605	22,005	29,461	28,693	321,596
Chiangrai United	2,276	2,215	2,507	1,627	1,417	2,221	2,196	2,240	1,343	1,282	1,536	1,076	1,258	5,040	2,214	30,448
Chonburi	7,799	4,953	3,992	4,513	5,942	3,484	4,103	3,962	4,231	3,955	6,902	4,018	3,964	3,994	3,983	69,795
Khonkaen United	5,528	4,214	3,548	4,861	6,392	4,118	3,873	3,913	6,167	4,408	6,304	3,684	3,859	4,131	5,105	70,105
Lampang	1,137	3,147	2,591	1,453	1,380	3,121	1,536	1,560	750	820	671	1,278	1,120	872	679	22,115
Lamphun Warriors	4,163	2,498	3,073	2,155	602	947	1,492	1,482	1,176	758	1,302	895	770	1,684	3,350	26,347
Muangthong United	6,342	3,753	6,913	5,311	4,711	3,127	4,307	10,487	7,523	4,751	2,345	2,712	4,712	5,194	3,327	75,515
Nakhon Ratchasima	9,561	6,837	4,380	4,384	3,497	3,245	3,202	3,430	2,433	2,598	2,387	2,479	4,440	3,666	3,652	60,191
Nongbua Pitchaya	2,492	2,181	3,125	2,260	2,384	2,089	2,570	2,250	2,145	2,013	2,526	5,987	2,360	1,154	1,295	36,831
Police Tero	1,785	1,850	2,375	985	1,407	984	1,280	1,389	1,817	1,250	829	945	981	1,831	939	20,647
Port	6,065	3,847	3,721	4,199	3,751	4,262	3,118	6,250	6,202	4,009	4,451	6,250	4,285	3,880	6,250	70,540
PT Prachuap	2,059	1,492	2,420	1,230	1,308	1,107	1,360	1,159	2,023	1,993	3,186	2,358	1,756	1,327	2,796	27,484
Ratchaburi	4,710	4,277	4,129	3,128	3,279	3,970	4,475	4,779	3,278	2,432	2,713	2,146	2,318	2,317	6,674	54,625
Sukhothai	3,005	1,684	1,838	1,816	2,825	1,680	3,073	7,998	5,029	3,552	3,846	3,217	3,848	4,655	4,528	52,594

Source: Thai League

== See also ==
- 2022–23 Thai League 2
- 2022–23 Thai League 3
- 2022–23 Thailand Amateur League
- 2022–23 Thai FA Cup
- 2022–23 Thai League Cup
- 2022 Thailand Champions Cup
