= Arthit Boodjinda =

Thai association football player

Personal information
- Full name: Arthit Boodjinda
- Date of birth: 7 August 1994 (age 32)
- Place of birth: Kalasin, Thailand
- Height: 1.83 m (6 ft 0 in)
- Position: Forward

Team information
- Current team: Uthai Thani

Youth career
- 2010–2012: Aspire Academy

Senior career*
| Years | Team | Apps | (Gls) |
| 2012–2017 | Buriram United | 3 | (0) |
| 2014 | → Surin City (loan) | 25 | (5) |
| 2015 | → Phichit (loan) | 30 | (10) |
| 2016 | → Chainat Hornbill (loan) | 16 | (1) |
| 2018–2021 | Port | 30 | (5) |
| 2019 | → Chonburi (loan) | 4 | (0) |
| 2020 | → Police Tero (loan) | 11 | (3) |
| 2021–2022 | Police Tero | 24 | (4) |
| 2022–2025 | Buriram United | 19 | (1) |
| 2024 | → PT Prachuap (loan) | 8 | (0) |
| 2024–2025 | → Rayong (loan) | 25 | (3) |
| 2025–2026 | Khon Kaen United | 29 | (18) |
| 2026– | Uthai Thani | 0 | (0) |
- * Club domestic league appearances and goals as of 21 June 2026

Arthit Boodjinda (Thai: อาทิตย์ บุตรจินดา; born 7 August 1994), is a Thai professional footballer who plays as a forward for Thai League 1 club Uthai Thani.

== Honours ==
Buriram United

- Thai League 1 (2): 2017, 2022–23
- Thai FA Cup: 2022–23
- Thai League Cup: 2022–23

Individual

- Thai League 2 Top Scorer: 2025–26
