= Suphanat Mueanta =

Thai footballer (born 2002)

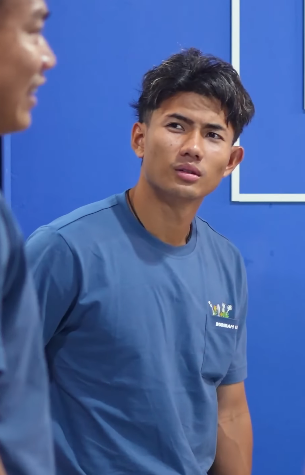
- Suphanat in 2025

Personal information
- Full name: Suphanat Mueanta
- Date of birth: 2 August 2002 (age 24)
- Place of birth: Sisaket, Thailand
- Height: 1.74 m (5 ft 8 1/2 in)
- Positions: Winger; forward

Team information
- Current team: RB Omiya Ardija
- Number: 21

Youth career
- 2016–2018: Buriram United

Senior career*
Years	Team	Apps	(Gls)
2018–2026	Buriram United	132	(38)
2023–2024	→ OH Leuven (loan)	16	(1)
2026–	RB Omiya Ardija	5	(1)

International career^{‡}
2016–2018	Thailand U16	16	(19)
2017–2019	Thailand U19	9	(13)
2019–2022	Thailand U23	16	(16)
2019–	Thailand	36	(15)
Medal record
Thailand
ASEAN Championship
Runner-up	Mitsubishi Electric Cup 2024	Team
- * Club domestic league appearances and goals as of 01:52, 20 September 2026 (UTC) ‡ National team caps and goals as of 26 March 2025

Suphanat Mueanta (Thai: ศุภณัฏฐ์ เหมือนตา, pronounced [sù(p).pʰā.nát mɯ̌an.tāː]; born 2 August 2002) is a Thai professional footballer who plays mainly as a right winger for J2 League club RB Omiya Ardija and the Thailand national team.

Suphanat currently holds the record of being the youngest player to play in the Thai League 1 and also the youngest goalscorer in the history of the league at 15 years old. He also notably holds the AFC record of being the youngest goalscorer in the history of the AFC Champions League at 16. At international level, he also become the youngest cap for the Thailand national team at 16 during a match against Vietnam.

== Club career ==
=== Buriram United ===
==== Early career ====
Suphanat has spent his entire career at Buriram United youth academy where at the age of 15, he was promoted to the senior squad. On 25 April 2018, Suphanat made his debut against Nakhon Ratchasima becoming the youngest player in the Thai League 1 history that has played in a match at 15 years old and 8 months. On 26 May 2018, he scored a league goal against Air Force United where he became the youngest goalscorer in Thai League history at 15 years and 9 months. He went on to score a brace in the same match in a 5–0 win.

On 9 April 2019, Suphanat became the youngest goalscorer of the AFC Champions League history at 16 years and 8 months against Chinese side, Beijing Guoan.

==== OH Leuven (loan) ====
On 5 September 2023, Suphanat signed a one-year loan deal with Belgian Pro League club OH Leuven. Earlier that year in June, he had already been training on several occasions at parent club Leicester City, while waiting to receive a work permit. On 1 November 2023, he made his debut for the club during the seventh round of the 2023–24 Belgian Cup, against Elene-Grotenberge. Three days later he also made his league debut against Westerlo and a few weeks later on 26 December 2023, he scored his first goal for the club as he netted the last goal just before time in a 3–0 home win over Eupen. At the end of the season, his loan deal was prolonged for another season until June 2025, however after only making four appearances that season, the loan deal was terminated on 31 October 2024 by mutual consent and Suphanat returned to Buriram United immediately.

==== Return to Buriram ====
On 12 January 2025, Suphanat make his return to Buriram after two years away on loan in a 3–2 lost to Bangkok United. On 19 January 2025, Suphanat scored his first career hat-trick and also recorded a hat-trick of assists in a 9–0 thrashing win against Khon Kaen United. On 12 February, Suphanat scored a stoppage time goal in the 90+3' added time to secure a 2–1 win over Korean giants Ulsan HD during the 2024–25 AFC Champions League Elite fixtures which see the team hopes of progressing to the knockout stage while also eliminating the Korean club out from the tournament. During the Round of 16 second leg of the AFC Champions League Elite against Southeast Asian rivals, Johor Darul Ta'zim on 11 March, Suphanat scored the only goal in the tie with his left foot which ended the debate between both club status thus sending Buriram United to the quarter-final of the tournament.

=== RB Omiya Ardija ===
On 27 June 2026, Japanese second tier club RB Omiya Ardija announced the signing of Mueanta.

== International career ==
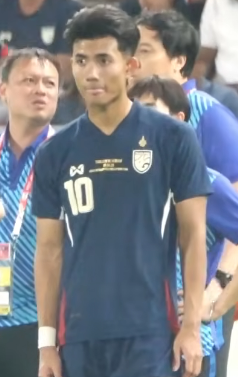
Suphanat with Thailand at the 2024 ASEAN Championship final

=== Youth ===
In October 2018, Suphanat played the 2018 AFC U-19 Championship with Thailand U19.

On 24 March 2019, Suphanat scored a goal, helping Thailand U23 to beat Brunei 8–0 the second match of Group K in the 2020 AFC U-23 Championship qualification.

In January 2020, Suphanat become the youngest-ever to score in a game at the AFC U-23 Championship with Thailand U23, this tournament acts as the AFC qualifiers for the 2020 Summer Olympics men's football tournament. He scored against Bahrain U23 on the first matchday.

=== Senior ===
In June 2019, Suphanat was named in head coach Sirisak Yodyardthai's squad for Thailand during the 2019 King's Cup. On 5 June 2019, in a match against rivals, Vietnam, he made his debut at the age of 16 years 10 months, becoming the youngest player in the history of the national team.

In May 2021, Suphanat scored his first international goal in a 2–2 draw against Tajikistan.

In January 2024, Suphanat was named in Thailand's squad for the 2023 AFC Asian Cup in Qatar.

On 21 March 2024, Suphanat equalised the scoreline to a 1–1 draw during the 2026 FIFA World Cup qualification match against Asian giants South Korea at the Seoul World Cup Stadium.

During the second leg of the 2024 ASEAN Championship semi-finals against Philippines, Suphanat came off the bench and scored a header in the 116th minute of extra time to send Thailand to the final while suffering with flu.

== Personal life ==
Suphanat has an older half-brother, Supachok Sarachat, who is also a footballer and plays as an attacking midfielder for J2 League club, Hokkaido Consadole Sapporo. His younger full-brother, Chotika Mueanta, plays football for Buriram United Academy.

== Career statistics ==
=== Club ===
As of match played 6 September 2026

Appearances and goals by club, season and competition
Club	Season	League			National cup (Note: Includes Thai FA Cup, Belgian Cup)		League cup (Note: Includes Thai League Cup)		Continental		Other		Total	
Club	Season	Division	Apps	Goals	Apps	Goals	Apps	Goals	Apps	Goals	Apps	Goals	Apps	Goals
Buriram United	2018	Thai League 1	9	2	2	0	1	0	0	0	0	0	12	2
Buriram United	2019	Thai League 1	23	8	4	0	5	0	5 (Note: Appearances in AFC Champions League)	1	1 (Note: Appearance in Thailand Champions Cup)	0	38	9
Buriram United	2020–21	Thai League 1	16	2	2	0	0	0	2	0	0	0	20	2
Buriram United	2021–22	Thai League 1	23	4	5	1	5	1	1	0	1	0	35	6
Buriram United	2022–23	Thai League 1	30	8	5	2	5	3	0	0	0	0	40	13
Buriram United	2024–25	Thai League 1	12	9	1	0	2	0	4	2	1 (Note: Appearances in ASEAN Club Championship)	0	20	11
Buriram United	2025–26	Thai League 1	19	5	4	1	2	2	7	3	8	3	40	14
Buriram United	Total		132	38	23	4	20	6	19	6	11	3	205	57
OH Leuven (loan)	2023–24	Belgian Pro League	14	1	1	0	—		—		—		15	1
OH Leuven (loan)	2024–25	Belgian Pro League	2	0	1	0	—		—		—		3	0
OH Leuven (loan)	Total		16	1	2	0	—		—		—		18	1
RB Omiya Ardija	2026–27	J2 League	5	1	1	1	1	0	—		—		7	2
Career total			153	40	26	5	21	6	19	6	11	3	230	60

=== International ===
As of 26 March 2025

Appearances and goals by national team and year
National team	Year	Apps	Goals
Thailand	2019	3	0
Thailand	2021	4	3
Thailand	2022	3	0
Thailand	2023	4	3
Thailand	2024	18	9
Thailand	2025	4	0
Total		36	15

Scores and results list Thailand's goal tally first, score column indicates score after each Mueanta goal.

List of international goals scored by Suphanat Mueanta
No.	Date	Venue	Opponent	Score	Result	Competition
1	29 May 2021	Khalid bin Mohammed Stadium, Sharjah, United Arab Emirates	Tajikistan	1–0	2–2	Friendly
2	29 May 2021	Khalid bin Mohammed Stadium, Sharjah, United Arab Emirates	Tajikistan	2–0	2–2	Friendly
3	7 June 2021	Zabeel Stadium, Dubai, United Arab Emirates	United Arab Emirates	1–2	1–3	2022 FIFA World Cup qualification
4	25 March 2023	Maktoum bin Rashid Al Maktoum Stadium, Dubai, United Arab Emirates	Syria	1–1	1–3	Friendly
5	21 November 2023	National Stadium, Kallang, Singapore	Singapore	2–1	3–1	2026 FIFA World Cup qualification
6	21 November 2023	National Stadium, Kallang, Singapore	Singapore	3–1	3–1	2026 FIFA World Cup qualification
7	21 March 2024	Seoul World Cup Stadium, Seoul, South Korea	South Korea	1–1	1–1	2026 FIFA World Cup qualification
8	11 June 2024	Rajamangala National Stadium, Bangkok, Thailand	Singapore	1–0	3–1	2026 FIFA World Cup qualification
9	10 September 2024	Mỹ Đình National Stadium, Hanoi, Vietnam	Vietnam	1–1	2–1	2024 LPBank Cup
10	11 October 2024	Tinsulanon Stadium, Songkhla, Thailand	Philippines	2–1	3–1	2024 King's Cup
11	11 October 2024	Tinsulanon Stadium, Songkhla, Thailand	Philippines	3–1	3–1	2024 King's Cup
12	8 December 2024	Hàng Đẫy Stadium, Hanoi, Vietnam	Timor-Leste	3–0	10–0	2024 ASEAN Championship
13	8 December 2024	Hàng Đẫy Stadium, Hanoi, Vietnam	Timor-Leste	5–0	10–0	2024 ASEAN Championship
14	17 December 2024	National Stadium, Kallang, Singapore	Singapore	2–2	4–2	2024 ASEAN Championship
15	30 December 2024	Rajamangala Stadium, Bangkok, Thailand	Philippines	3–1	3–1	2024 ASEAN Championship

== Honours ==
Buriram United

- Thai League 1: 2018, 2021–22, 2022–23, 2023–24, 2024–25, 2025–26
- Thai FA Cup: 2021–22, 2022–23, 2024–25, 2025–26
- Thai League Cup: 2021–22, 2022–23, 2024–25
- Thailand Champions Cup: 2019
- ASEAN Club Championship: 2024–25, 2025–26

Thailand U-16

- AFF U-16 Youth Championship runner-up: 2017

Thailand

- King's Cup: 2024, 2026
- ASEAN Championship runner-up: 2024

Individual

- AFF Youth Player of the Year: 2019
- Thai League 1 Player of the Month: February 2023, January 2025
- Thai League 1 Goal of the Month: February 2023
- ASEAN Championship best young player: 2024
