= Xavi Moro =

Spanish footballer (born 1975)

Personal information
- Full name: Xavier Moro León
- Date of birth: 22 May 1975 (age 51)
- Place of birth: Paris, France
- Height: 1.75 m (5 ft 9 in)
- Position: Midfielder

Youth career
- 1988–1993: Barcelona

Senior career*
Years	Team	Apps	(Gls)
1993–1996	Barcelona C	92	(19)
1995–1996	Barcelona B	19	(0)
1996–1998	Córdoba	43	(1)
1998–1999	Sabadell	34	(1)
1999–2000	Castellón	28	(0)
2000–2004	Badajoz	129	(8)
2003	→ Hércules (loan)	14	(0)
2004–2007	Lorca Deportiva	125	(4)
2008	Iraklis	7	(0)
2008–2009	Mérida	23	(0)
2009–2011	Sant Andreu	47	(1)
2011–2012	Cornellà	?	(1)
2012–2014	Vista Alegre		

International career
1992–1993	Spain U18	5	(0)
1992	Spain U19	7	(1)

Managerial career
- 2012–2014: Vista Alegre (player-coach)
- 2018: Bangkok Glass (assistant)
- 2022–2023: Ratchaburi
- 2024: Chiangrai United
- 2025–: Johor Darul Ta'zim (assistant)
- * Club domestic league appearances and goals

Xavier 'Xavi' Moro León (born 22 May 1975) is a Spanish professional football manager and former player who was most recently the head coach of Thai League 1 club Chiangrai United.

He was a Spanish footballer who played as a central midfielder.

== Club career ==
Born in Paris, France, to Spanish immigrants, Moro amassed Segunda División totals of 202 games and 11 goals over the course of eight seasons, representing in the competition FC Barcelona B, CD Badajoz and Lorca Deportiva CF. From January–June 2008 he played in the Super League Greece, with Iraklis.

Xavi Moro spent 12 years at FC Barcelona since U9 to FC Barcelona B and some games with 1st Team, tallying 464 professional games in his 18 year career. He was coached by Johan Cruyff, Bobby Robson and Jose Mourinho and played with the likes of Ronaldo, Guardiola, Bakero, Figo and many more.

Moro retired in 2014 at the age of 39, after two years as player-coach of amateurs UD Vista Alegre. In 2018, he joined Josep Ferré's staff at Bangkok Glass FC.

On 4 July 2022, Moro was appointed manager of Thai League 1 side Ratchaburi Mitr Phol FC. He left on 11 May of the following year.

== Managerial statistics ==
As of match played 9 November 2024

Managerial record by team and tenure
Team	Nat	From	To	Record							
Team	Nat	From	To	G	W	D	L	GF	GA	GD	Win %
Ratchaburi	(Thailand)	4 July 2022	11 May 2023	35	13	12	10	41	31	+10	37.14
Chiangrai United	(Thailand)	1 July 2024	19 November 2024	12	3	1	8	10	24	−14	25.00
Total				47	16	13	18	51	55	−4	34.04
