= Lonsana Doumbouya =

Guinean international footballer (born 1990)

Personal information
- Date of birth: 26 September 1990 (age 36)
- Place of birth: Nice, France
- Position: Striker

Team information
- Current team: Port
- Number: 26

Youth career
- –2009: CO Saint-Dizier
- 2009–2010: EA Guingamp
- 2010–2011: Genêts Anglet

Senior career*
Years	Team	Apps	(Gls)
2009–2010	EA Guingamp B	1	(0)
2010–2011	Genêts Anglet	10	(0)
2011–2012	Seraing R.U.L.	10	(0)
2012–2013	RCS Verviers	32	(11)
2013–2015	Tubize	59	(19)
2015–2016	Cercle Brugge	31	(9)
2016–2017	Inverness Caledonian Thistle	19	(5)
2017–2018	SKN St. Pölten	23	(3)
2018	PT Prachuap	26	(16)
2019	Trat	28	(20)
2020–2021	Meizhou Hakka	28	(18)
2021	Shanghai Shenhua	10	(3)
2022–2024	Buriram United	28	(15)
2024–2025	Port	25	(7)

International career
2016	Guinea	2	(0)
- * Club domestic league appearances and goals as of 30 April 2025

Lonsana Doumbouya (born 26 September 1990) is a Guinean professional footballer who most recently played for Thai League 1 club Port.

== Club career ==
Doumbouya played in his native France early in his career. He played for Belgian club Cercle Brugge during the 2015–16 season.

On 25 August 2016, Doumbouya signed for Scottish Premiership club Inverness Caledonian Thistle, on a two-year deal.

However, on 31 January 2017 he was released from his contract with Inverness which allowed him to sign for Austrian Bundesliga side St. Polten.

On 30 July 2021, Doumbouya joined Chinese Super League club Shanghai Shenhua. By the time of the transfer, he was the top goalscorer in the 2021 China League One with 10 goals. On 29 April 2022, Doumbouya left Shanghai Shenhua.

== International career ==
Doumouya was born in France to parents of Guinean descent. He debuted for the Guinea national football team in a 2–1 2018 World Cup qualification loss to the DR Congo on 13 November 2016.

== Career statistics ==
As of match played 30 April 2025.

Appearances and goals by club, season and competition
Club	Season	League			National Cup		League Cup		Continental		Other		Total	
Club	Season	Division	Apps	Goals	Apps	Goals	Apps	Goals	Apps	Goals	Apps	Goals	Apps	Goals
EA Guingamp B	2009–2010	CFA 2	1	0	—		—		—		—		1	0
Genêts Anglet	2010–11	CFA	10	0	0	0	—		—		—		10	0
Seraing R.U.L.	2011–12	Belgian Second Amateur Division	10	0	0	0	—		—		—		10	0
RCS Verviers	2012–13	Belgian Third Division	32	11	0	0	—		—		—		32	11
Tubize	2013–14	Belgian Second Division	30	9	2	1	—		—		—		32	10
Tubize	2014–15	Belgian Second Division	29	10	1	0	—		—		—		30	10
Tubize	Total		59	19	3	1	—		—		—		62	20
Cercle Brugge	2015–16	Belgian Second Division	31	9	2	1	—		—		—		33	10
Inverness Caledonian Thistle	2016–17	Scottish Premiership	19	5	1	0	0	0	—		—		20	5
SKN St. Pölten	2016–17	Austrian Football Bundesliga	13	3	1	0	—		—		—		14	3
SKN St. Pölten	2017–18	Austrian Football Bundesliga	10	0	1	0	—		—		—		11	0
SKN St. Pölten	Total		23	3	2	0	—		—		—		25	3
PT Prachuap	2018	Thai League 1	26	16	0	0	1	1	—		—		27	17
Trat	2019	Thai League 1	28	20	1	1	0	0	—		—		29	21
Meizhou Hakka	2020	China League One	14	8	0	0	—		—		—		14	8
Meizhou Hakka	2021	China League One	14	10	0	0	—		—		—		14	10
Meizhou Hakka	Total		28	18	0	0	—		—		—		28	18
Shanghai Shenhua	2021	Chinese Super League	10	3	4	1	—		—		—		14	4
Buriram United	2022–23	Thai League 1	16	12	4	2	2	0	—		1	0	23	14
Buriram United	2023–24	Thai League 1	12	3	2	3	3	0	5 (Note: Appearances in AFC Champions League Elite)	2	1	0	23	8
Buriram United	Total		28	15	6	5	5	0	5	2	2	0	46	22
Port	2024–25	Thai League 1	25	7	1	1	2	2	8 (Note: Appearances in AFC Champions League Two)	3	0	0	36	13
Career total			330	126	16	8	8	3	13	5	2	0	367	142

== Honours ==
Buriram United

- Thai League 1: 2022–23
- Thai FA Cup: 2022–23
- Thai League Cup: 2022–23

Individual

- Thai League 1 Top Scorer: 2019
