= Diego Bardanca =

Filipino footballer

Personal information
- Full name: Diego Bardanca Flórez
- Date of birth: 20 March 1993 (age 33)
- Place of birth: León, Spain
- Height: 1.90 m (6 ft 3 in)
- Position: Centre-back

Team information
- Current team: Kanchanaburi Power
- Number: 44

Youth career
- –2007: FC Puente Castro
- 2007–2011: Deportivo La Coruña

Senior career*
Years	Team	Apps	(Gls)
2011–2013	Valladolid B	33	(1)
2013–2014	Recreativo B	34	(0)
2014–2015	Eldense	18	(0)
2015–2016	Levante B	4	(0)
2016–2017	Jaén	30	(0)
2017	SJK	23	(0)
2018	Ibiza	30	(0)
2018	Gimnástica	18	(0)
2019	Bytovia Bytów	12	(0)
2019	Inđija	0	(0)
2020	Gorica	10	(0)
2021	Lokomotiv Tashkent	4	(0)
2021	Puszcza Niepołomice	5	(0)
2022–2023	Buriram United	7	(1)
2022–2023	→ Chonburi (loan)	12	(0)
2023–2024	Persis Solo	18	(1)
2024–2025	Kitchee	3	(0)
2025–2026	Kanchanaburi Power	22	(1)

International career
2022	Philippines	3	(0)
- * Club domestic league appearances and goals as of 10 May 2026

Diego Bardanca Flórez (born 20 March 1993) is a professional footballer who plays as a centre back for Thai League 1 club Kanchanaburi Power. Born in Spain, he represented the Philippines national team.

== Club career ==
Born in León, Bardanca started his career with Galician side Deportivo La Coruña, before moving to Real Valladolid, where he spent time with the club's 'B' team and was tipped as a promising young player.

=== SJK ===
After spending time with various other Spanish lower division sides, Bardanca joined Finnish side Seinäjoen Jalkapallokerho in 2017.

=== Bytovia Bytów ===
In 2019, Bardanca signed a six-month contract with I liga club Bytovia Bytów.

=== Inđija ===
On 20 July 2019, he signed a contract with Serbian side Inđija. He was released at the end of 2019. His only appearance for the club was a two-minute cameo in a round of 32 fixture in the 2019–20 Serbian Cup.

=== Gorica ===
On 6 February 2020, he signed for Gorica until the end of the 2019–20 season. In August 2020, he extended his contract until the end of the 2020–21 season.

=== Puszcza Niepołomice ===
On 23 July 2021, he returned to Poland and signed with I liga side Puszcza Niepołomice on a one-year deal. He left the club by mutual consent on 2 November 2021.

=== Buriram United ===
In February 2022, he joined Thai League 1 club Buriram United.

=== Kitchee ===
On 5 July 2024, Bardanca joined Hong Kong Premier League club Kitchee.

=== Kanchanaburi Power ===
On 26 July 2025, Bardanca joined newly promoted Thai League 1 club Kanchanaburi Power.

== International career ==
Bardanca is eligible to represent Spain at international level, and is also eligible to play for the Philippines due to his grandmother being born in the country.

=== Philippines ===
In 2019, it was reported that Bardanca received an invitation to train with the Philippines.

In June 2019, Bardanca received his first call-up for the Philippines in a friendly against China, but eventually did not take part due to eligibility constraints.

Bardanca was included in the 25-man squad of the Philippines for 2022 FAS Tri-Nations Series.

He debuted in a 2–0 friendly loss to Malaysia on 23 March 2022.

== Career statistics ==
=== International ===
As of match played 16 July 2022

Appearances and goals by national team and year
National team	Year	Apps	Goals
Philippines	2022	3	0
Total		3	0
