= Goran Čaušić =

Serbian footballer (born 1992)

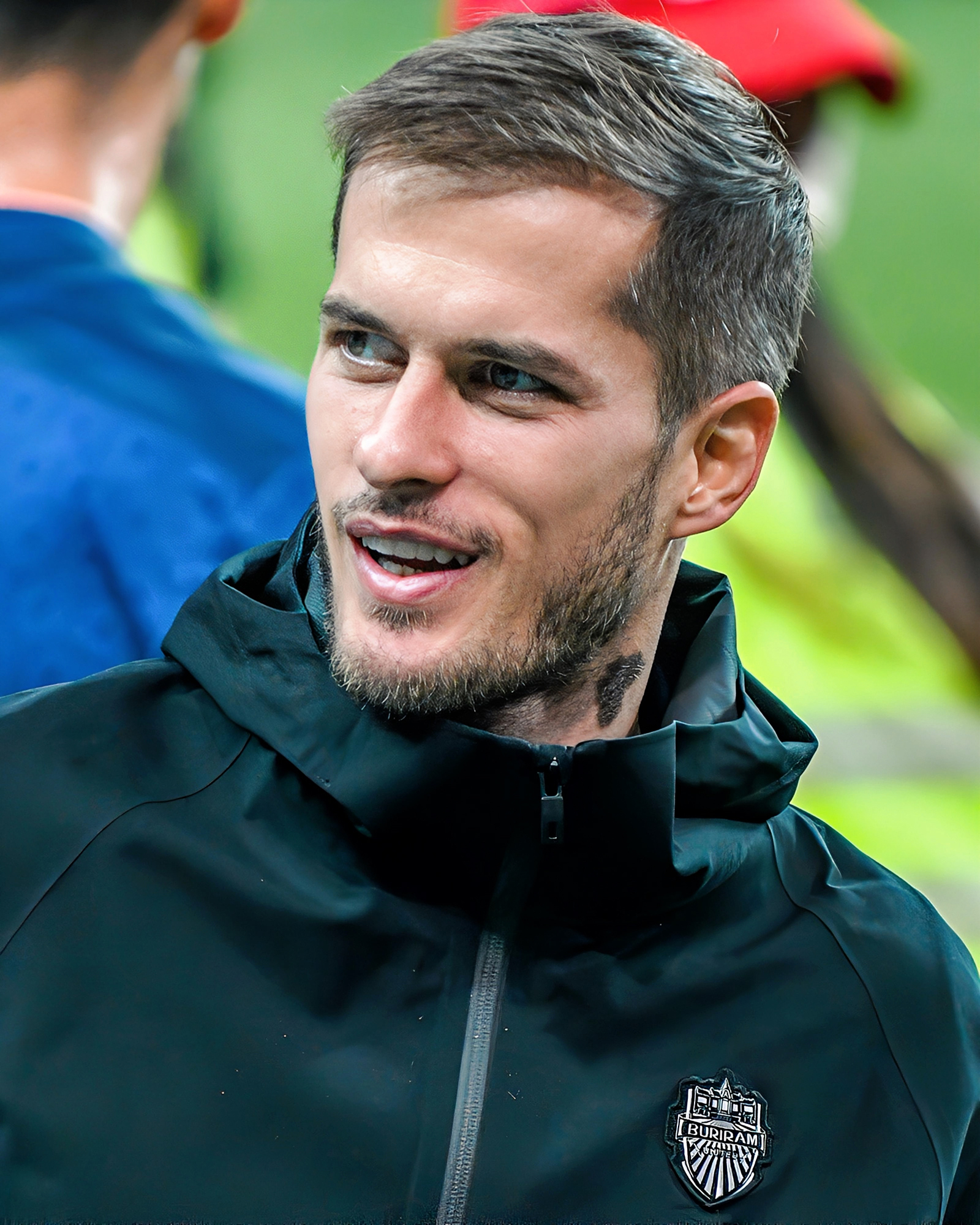
- Čaušić with Buriram United in 2025

Personal information
- Date of birth: 5 May 1992 (age 34)
- Place of birth: Belgrade, FR Yugoslavia
- Height: 1.79 m (5 ft 10 in)
- Position: Midfielder

Team information
- Current team: Buriram United
- Number: 23

Youth career
- Red Star Belgrade

Senior career*
Years	Team	Apps	(Gls)
2009–2011	Red Star Belgrade	0	(0)
2009–2011	→ Sopot (loan)	48	(6)
2012	Rad	28	(4)
2013–2016	Eskişehirspor	63	(3)
2014	→ Manisaspor (loan)	17	(3)
2016–2017	Osasuna	26	(1)
2017–2018	Arsenal Tula	31	(3)
2018–2019	Red Star Belgrade	21	(1)
2019–2022	Arsenal Tula	66	(5)
2022–2024	Buriram United	52	(22)
2024–	Buriram United	28	(8)

International career
2010–2011	Serbia U19 (Note: Only official UEFA matches included)	10	(1)
2012–2015	Serbia U21	15	(1)
- * Club domestic league appearances and goals as of 2 February 2025

Goran Čaušić (Serbian Cyrillic: Горан Чаушић, pronounced [ɡǒran tʃǎuʃitɕ]; born 5 May 1992) is a Serbian professional footballer who plays as a midfielder for Thai League 1 club Buriram United.

== Club career ==
=== Early years ===
On 16 June 2009, Čaušić signed his first professional contract with Red Star Belgrade, on a three-year deal. He was subsequently sent on loan to Sopot, gaining experience for two seasons in the Serbian League Belgrade. In early 2012, Čaušić was transferred to Rad.

=== Eskişehirspor ===
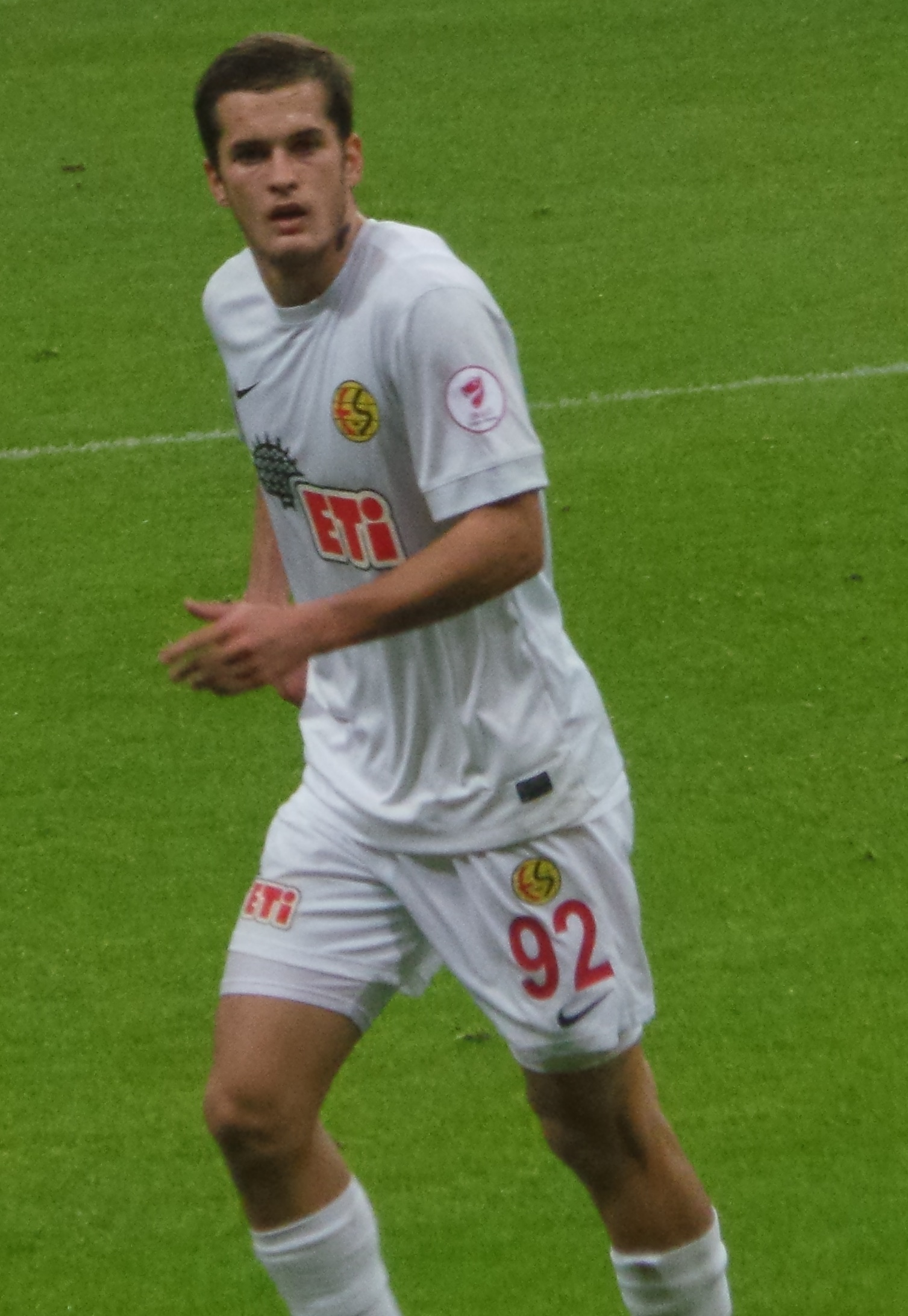
Čaušić playing for Eskişehirspor in 2014.

On 26 December 2012, alongside Andrej Mrkela, Čaušić signed for Turkish club Eskişehirspor on a four-and-a-half-year deal. He scored his first goal for the club on 11 January 2013 in a Turkish Cup match against Mersin İdmanyurdu.

=== Osasuna ===
On 13 July 2016, Čaušić signed a two-year contract with Spanish La Liga club Osasuna. After featuring regularly but suffering relegation, he cut ties with the club on 5 July 2017.

=== Arsenal Tula ===
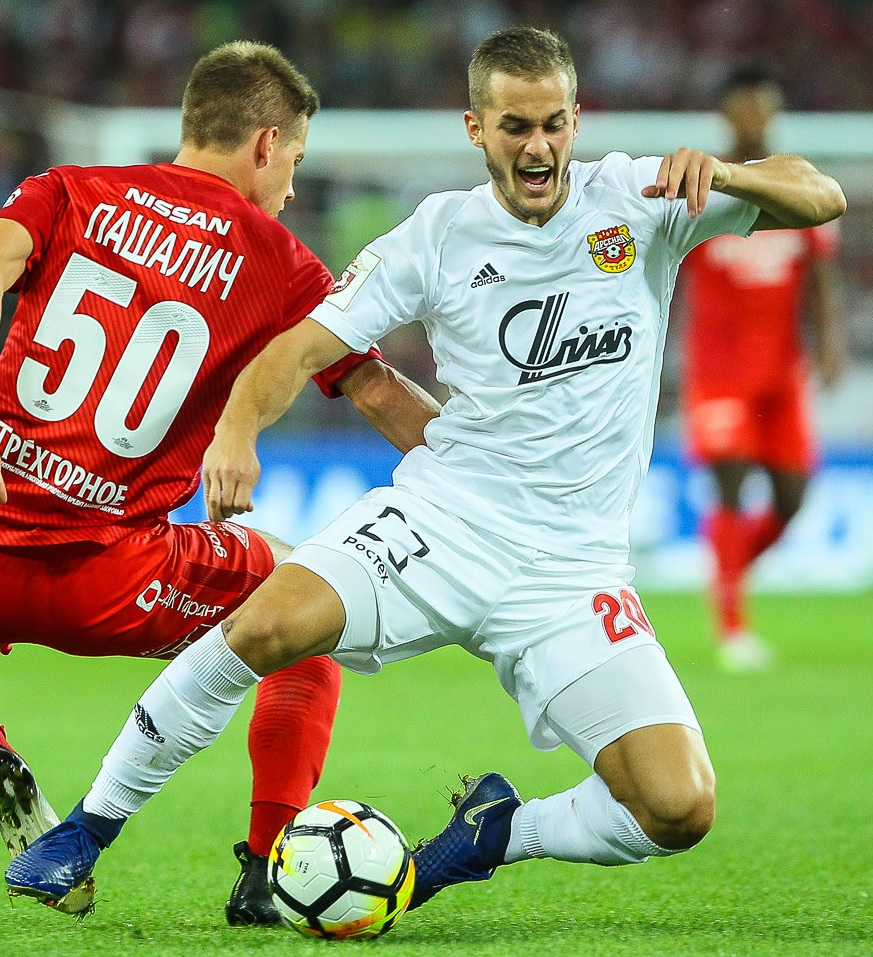
Čaušić with Arsenal Tula in 2017.

On 11 July 2017, Čaušić signed a two-year contract with the Russian Premier League club Arsenal Tula. At the time of his arrival, Arsenal Tula's coach was Miodrag Božović. On 4 March 2018, Čaušić scored a last minute goal from 22 meters out in a 1–0 win against Akhmat Grozny. He subsequently took off his shirt in celebration despite snowy conditions, and a fight ensued on the pitch between the two teams.

=== Return to Red Star Belgrade ===
On 31 August 2018, he returned to Red Star Belgrade. On 15 September 2018, in his first upon returning to Red Star, he scored a goal in a 6–0 home victory against Radnik Surdulica.

=== Return to Arsenal Tula ===
On 7 July 2019, Čaušić returned to Arsenal Tula, signing a long-term contract.

=== Buriram United ===
On 19 June 2022, Thailand club Buriram United announced the signing of Goran Čaušić.

== International career ==
Čaušić represented his country at the 2011 UEFA European Under-19 Championship and the 2015 UEFA European Under-21 Championship.

== Career statistics ==
=== Club ===
As of 21 May 2022

Appearances and goals by club, season and competition
Club	Season	League			Cup		Continental		Total	
Club	Season	Division	Apps	Goals	Apps	Goals	Apps	Goals	Apps	Goals
Red Star Belgrade	2011–12	Serbian SuperLiga	0	0	0	0	0	0	0	0
Rad	2011–12	Serbian SuperLiga	13	2	–		–		13	2
Rad	2012–13	Serbian SuperLiga	15	2	2	0	–		17	2
Rad	Total		28	4	2	0	0	0	30	4
Eskişehirspor	2012–13	Süper Lig	13	0	6	1	–		19	1
Eskişehirspor	2013–14	Süper Lig	0	0	4	1	–		4	1
Eskişehirspor	2014–15	Süper Lig	27	3	5	0	–		32	3
Eskişehirspor	2015–16	Süper Lig	23	0	3	0	–		26	0
Eskişehirspor	Total		63	3	18	2	0	0	81	5
Manisaspor (loan)	2013–14	TFF First League	17	3	–		–		17	3
Osasuna	2016–17	La Liga	26	1	2	0	–		28	1
Arsenal Tula	2017–18	Russian Premier League	26	3	1	0	–		27	3
Arsenal Tula	2018–19	Russian Premier League	5	0	0	0	–		5	0
Arsenal Tula	Total		31	3	1	0	0	0	32	3
Red Star Belgrade	2018–19	Serbian SuperLiga	21	1	2	0	5	0	28	1
Arsenal Tula	2019–20	Russian Premier League	21	2	1	0	2	0	24	2
Arsenal Tula	2020–21	Russian Premier League	22	1	2	0	–		24	1
Arsenal Tula	2021–22	Russian Premier League	23	2	1	0	–		24	2
Arsenal Tula	Total		66	5	4	0	2	0	72	5
Career total			252	20	29	2	7	0	288	22

== Honours ==
Red Star Belgrade

- Serbian SuperLiga: 2018–19

Buriram United

- Thai League 1 : 2022–23, 2023–24, 2024–25
- Thai FA Cup: 2022–23, 2024–25
- Thai League Cup : 2022–23

Individual

- Thai League 1 Team of the Season: 2025–26
