= Supachai Chaided =

Thai footballer (born 1998)

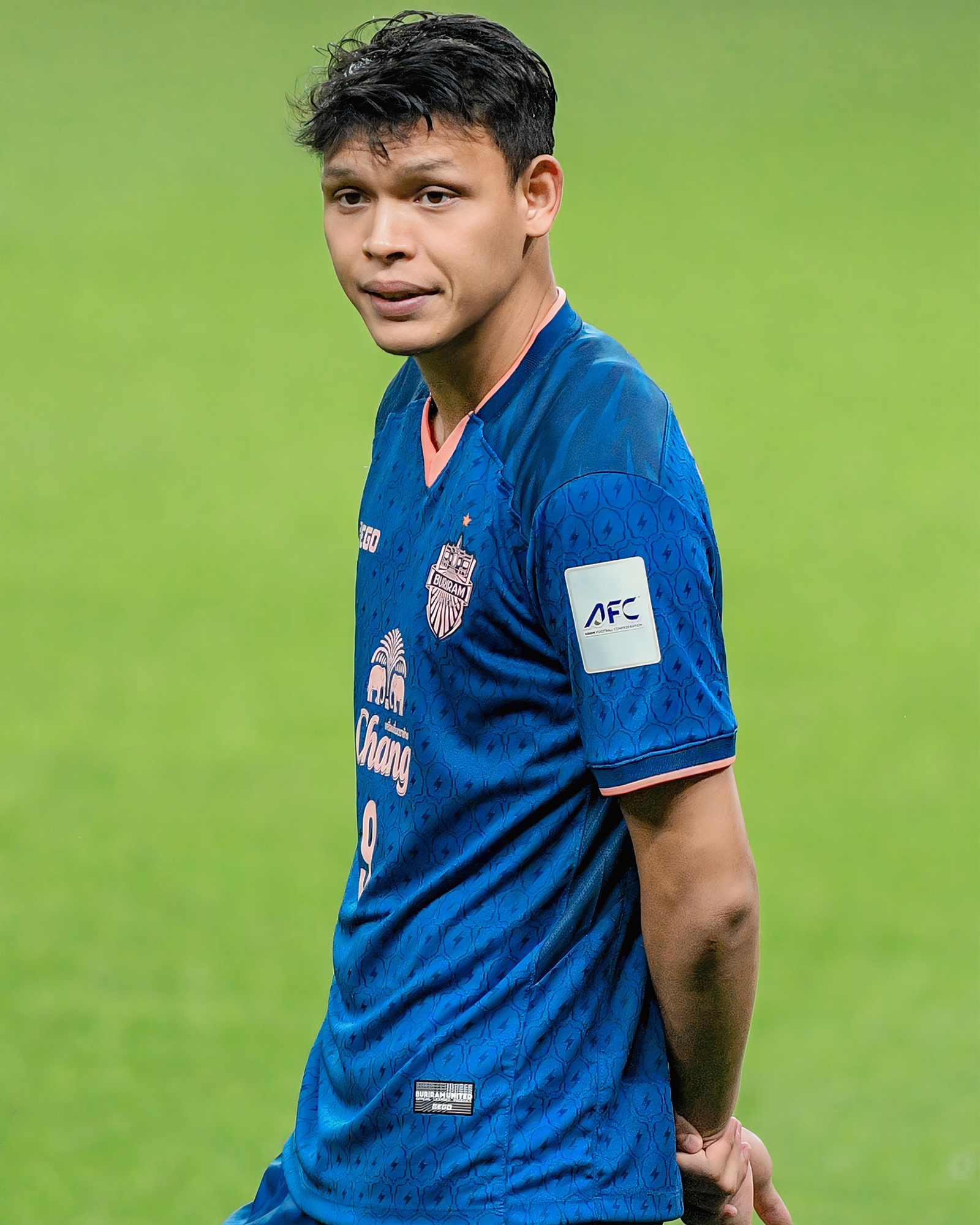
- Chaided in 2025

Personal information
- Full name: Supachai Chaided
- Date of birth: 1 December 1998 (age 27)
- Place of birth: Pattani, Thailand
- Height: 1.85 m (6 ft 1 in)
- Position: Forward

Team information
- Current team: Buriram United
- Number: 9

Youth career
- 2014–2016: Patumkongka School

Senior career*
Years	Team	Apps	(Gls)
2016–2017	Super Power Samut Prakan	20	(1)
2017–	Buriram United	227	(76)

International career^{‡}
2015–2016	Thailand U19	16	(7)
2018	Thailand U21	2	(1)
2018–2020	Thailand U22	5	(2)
2020–2022	Thailand U23	16	(10)
2018–	Thailand	49	(8)
Medal record
Men's football
Representing Thailand
FIFA ASEAN Cup
Runner-up	2026 Indonesia	Team
AFF Championship
Winner	2020 Singapore	Team
- * Club domestic league appearances and goals as of 24 August 2025 ‡ National team caps and goals as of 5 October 2026

Supachai Chaided (Thai: ศุภชัย ใจเด็ด, RTGS: Suphachai Chaidet, sometimes known as Supachai Jaided in English; born 1 December 1998) is a Thai professional footballer who plays as a forward for Thai League 1 club Buriram United and the Thailand national team.

== Club career ==
Supachai was last on target in the league in the 2-0 win against Bangkok United on March 18, netting in the ninth minute. He opened his account for the campaign against Rayong on November 11, scoring during a 5-1 victory. Supachai played 28 Thai League 1 games last season for Buriram United and scored two goals.

Supachai last played in a Thai League 1 match on March 28 for Buriram United versus Police Tero. He picked up one assist in that game for his team in the side's 2-0 victory. The attacker has netted five Thai League 1 goals this campaign,. He has been shown four yellow cards.

Supachai Jaided, the Buriram United attacker, has appeared in the vast majority of the club's Thai League 1 games in 2020, making 28 appearances overall and accumulating 1,597 minutes of playing time. He has been selected in the starting XI in 18 of these appearances across their 30 fixtures and been used as a substitute on 10 occasions.

== International career ==
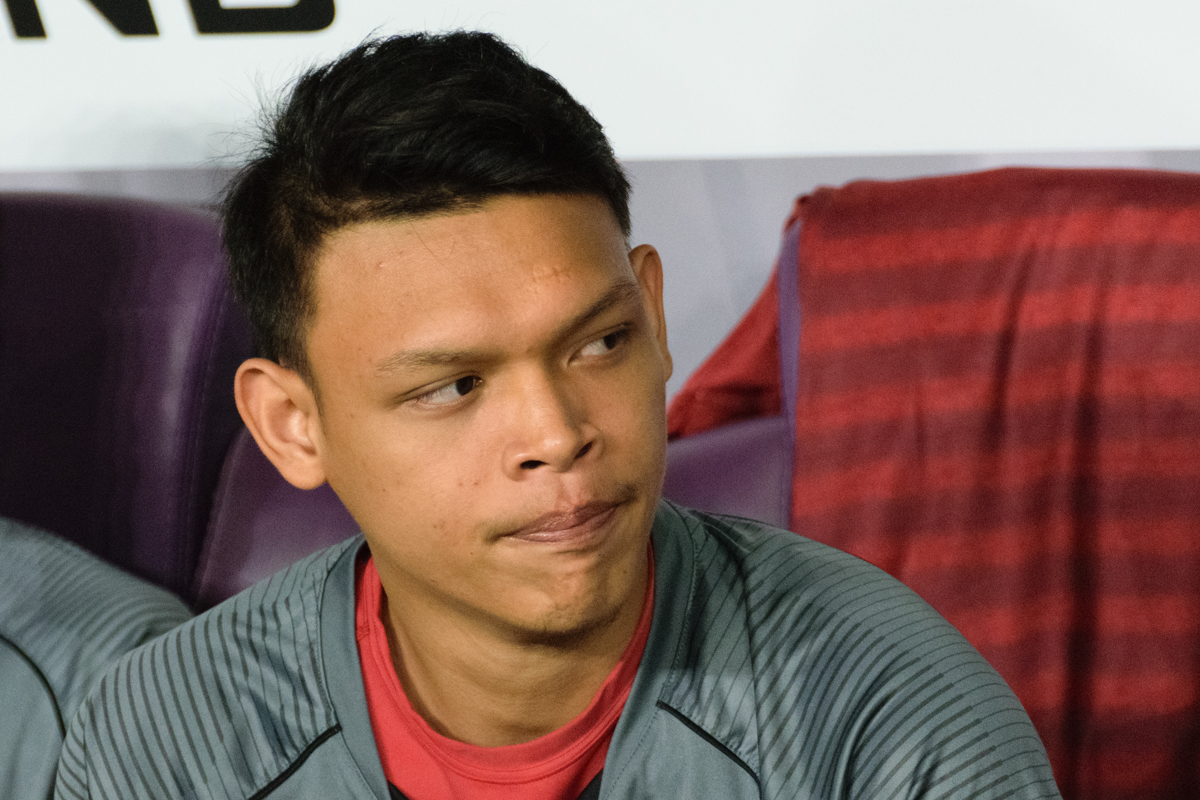
Supachai with Thailand at the 2019 AFC Asian Cup

In 2018 he was called up by Thailand national team for the 2018 AFF Suzuki Cup.

Supachai was named for the final squad in 2019 AFC Asian Cup.

In 2024, he was named in the 26-man squad for the 2023 AFC Asian Cup in Qatar. He scored twice on the first matchday against Kyrgyzstan.

== Career statistics ==
=== International ===
As of 5 October 2026

National team	Year	Apps	Goals
Thailand
Thailand	2018	8	3
Thailand	2019	9	1
Thailand	2021	9	1
Thailand	2022	1	0
Thailand	2023	4	0
Thailand	2024	10	2
Thailand	2025	4	1
Thailand	2026	4	0
Total		49	8

== International goals ==
Senior

Scores and results list Thailand's goal tally first.

No.	Date	Venue	Opponent	Score	Result	Competition
1.	9 November 2018	Rajamangala Stadium, Bangkok, Thailand	Timor-Leste	7–0	7–0	2018 AFF Championship
2.	21 November 2018	Panaad Stadium, Bacolod, Philippines	Philippines	1–0	1–1	2018 AFF Championship
3.	25 November 2018	Rajamangala Stadium, Bangkok, Thailand	Singapore	2–0	3–0	2018 AFF Championship
4.	20 January 2019	Hazza bin Zayed Stadium, Al Ain, United Arab Emirates	China	1–0	1–2	2019 AFC Asian Cup
5.	18 December 2021	National Stadium, Kallang, Singapore	Singapore	2–0	2–0	2020 AFF Championship
6.	16 January 2024	Abdullah bin Khalifa Stadium, Doha, Qatar	Kyrgyzstan	1–0	2–0	2023 AFC Asian Cup
7.	16 January 2024	Abdullah bin Khalifa Stadium, Doha, Qatar	Kyrgyzstan	2–0	2–0	2023 AFC Asian Cup
8.	10 June 2025	Ashgabat Stadium, Ashgabat, Turkmenistan	Turkmenistan	1–1	1–3	2027 AFC Asian Cup qualification

== Personal life ==
Supachai hails from Pattani, situated in Southern Thailand. Born into a Muslim Malay family in this region, he grew up in an area where Malay language is commonly used for communication across three provinces: Pattani, Yala, and Narathiwat.

== Honours ==
Buriram United

- Thai League 1: 2017, 2018, 2021–22, 2022–23, 2023–24, 2024–25
- Thai FA Cup: 2021–22, 2022–23, 2024–25
- Thai League Cup: 2021–22, 2022–23, 2024–25
- Mekong Club Championship: 2016
- Thailand Champions Cup: 2019
- ASEAN Club Championship: 2024–25

Thailand U-19

- AFF U-19 Youth Championship: 2015

Thailand

- AFF Championship: 2020
- King's Cup: 2024

Individual

- Thai League Best XI: 2021–22, 2023–24
- Thai League 1 Top Scorer: 2022–23, 2023–24
- Thai League 1 Most Valuable Players : 2022–23, 2023–24
- Thai League 1 Player of the Month: December 2023
