= Eric Johana Omondi =

Kenyan footballer (born 1994)

Eric Omondi
Personal information
- Full name: Erick Omondi Johana
- Date of birth: 18 August 1994 (age 32)
- Place of birth: Nairobi, Kenya
- Height: 1.86 m (6 ft 1 in)
- Position: Winger

Senior career*
| Years | Team | Apps | (Gls) |
| 2014–2016 | Mathare United | 55 | (12) |
| 2017 | Vasalund | 22 | (5) |
| 2018–2019 | Brommapojkarna | 43 | (6) |
| 2020–2021 | Jönköpings Södra | 51 | (14) |
| 2022 | Waasland-Beveren | 4 | (0) |
| 2022–2023 | Muangthong United | 23 | (9) |
| 2023–2025 | UTA Arad | 61 | (7) |
| 2025–2026 | Al-Zulfi | 12 | (2) |

International career^{‡}
| 2015– | Kenya | 39 | (4) |
- * Club domestic league appearances and goals as of 17 May 2025 ‡ National team caps and goals as of 20 March 2025

Eric Johana Omondi (born 18 August 1994) is a Kenyan professional footballer who plays as a winger for the Kenya national team.

== Club career ==
On 26 January 2022, Johana Omondi joined Waasland-Beveren in Belgium as a free agent, on a 6-month contract.

On 14 August 2025, Omondi joined Saudi FDL club Al-Zulfi.

== International career ==
Johana has 11 caps for the Kenya national football team; his debut game was against Ethiopia on 4 July 2015 at Nyayo stadium and his maiden goal was the winning goal for Kenya against Congo at Kasarani Stadium with a 2–1 final score line.

=== International stats ===
Kenya
| Year | Apps | Goals |
|---|---|---|
| 2015 | 7 | 0 |
| 2016 | 9 | 2 |
| 2017 | 1 | 0 |
| 2018 | 6 | 2 |
| 2019 | 8 | 0 |
| 2020 | 3 | 0 |
| 2021 | 2 | 0 |
| 2022 | 0 | 0 |
| 2023 | 1 | 0 |
| 2024 | 1 | 0 |
| 2025 | 1 | 0 |
| Total | 39 | 4 |

=== International goals ===
Scores and results list Kenya's goal tally first.

| No | Date | Venue | Opponent | Score | Result | Competition |
|---|---|---|---|---|---|---|
| 1. | 4 June 2016 | Moi International Sports Centre, Nairobi, Kenya | Congo | 2–1 | 2–1 | 2017 Africa Cup of Nations qualification |
| 2. | 12 November 2016 | Moi International Sports Centre, Nairobi, Kenya | Mozambique | 1–0 | 1–0 | Friendly |
| 3. | 27 March 2018 | Stade de Marrakech, Marrakesh, Morocco | Central African Republic | 1–1 | 2–3 | Friendly |
| 4. | 14 October 2018 | Moi International Sports Centre, Nairobi, Kenya | Ethiopia | 2–0 | 3–0 | 2019 Africa Cup of Nations qualification |

== Honours ==
=== Individual ===
- Kenya Premier League midfielder of the year: 2015.
