= List of Thai League 1 managers =

The Thai League 1 is managers (head coaches) in Thai football league system.

== Current Thai League 1 managers ==
Key
‡	Caretaker manager

Manager	Nation	Date of birth	Club	Division	From	Time as manager
Jugkrit Siriwattanasart	Thailand		Ayutthaya United	Thai League 1	1 July 2024	2 years, 133 days
Danny Invincible	Australia	31 March 1979	Bangkok United	Thai League 1	26 October 2026	16 days
Peerapong Pichitchotirat	Thailand	28 June 1984	BG Pathum United	Thai League 1	16 October 2026	26 days
Raúl Caneda	Spain	21 January 1969	Buriram United	Thai League 1	31 October 2026	11 days
Worawut Wangsawad	Thailand	16 September 1981	Chiangrai United	Thai League 1	1 July 2026	133 days
Vacant			Chonburi	Thai League 1	13 October 2026	29 days
Dennis Amato	Germany	26 June 1980	Lamphun Warrior	Thai League 1	15 December 2025	331 days
Harnnarong Chunhakunakorn	Thailand	22 October 1983	Pattani	Thai League 1	7 October 2025	1 year, 35 days
Božidar Bandović	Montenegro	30 August 1969	Port	Thai League 1	25 September 2026	47 days
Sasom Pobprasert	Thailand	10 October 1967	PT Prachuap	Thai League 1	31 January 2024	2 years, 284 days
Surapong Kongthep	Thailand	18 January 1979	Rasisalai United	Thai League 1	18 October 2026	24 days
Worrawoot Srimaka	Thailand	8 December 1971	Ratchaburi	Thai League 1	19 November 2024	1 year, 357 days
Aktaporn Chalitaporn	Thailand	17 February 1982	Rayong	Thai League 1	19 June 2026	145 days
Somchai Chuayboonchum	Thailand	17 February 1954	Sisaket United	Thai League 1	1 July 2025	1 year, 133 days
Eduardo Almeida	Portugal	22 March 1978	Sukhothai	Thai League 1	10 November 2026	1 day
Alexandre Gama	Brazil	4 January 1968	Uthai Thani	Thai League 1	8 June 2026	156 days

=== By nationality ===
Country	Total
Thailand	9
Australia	1
Brazil	1
Germany	1
Montenegro	1
Portugal	1
Spain	1
Total	15

== List of Thai football championship-winning managers ==
Thai football championship-winning managers
Season	Nationality	Manager	Club
1996–97	Thailand	Witthaya Laohakul	Bangkok Bank
1997	Thailand	Piyapong Pue-on	Royal Thai Air Force
1998	Thailand	Karoon Narksawat	Sinthana
1999	Thailand	Piyapong Pue-on (2)	Royal Thai Air Force
2000	England	Jason Withe	BEC Tero Sasana
2001–02	Thailand	Pichai Pituwong	BEC Tero Sasana
2002–03	Thailand	Narong Suwannachot	Krung Thai Bank
2003–04	Thailand	Worrawoot Dangsamer	Krung Thai Bank
2004–05	Brazil	Jose Alves Borges	Thailand Tobacco Monopoly
2006	Thailand	Somchai Subpherm	Bangkok University
2007	Thailand	Jadet Meelarp	Chonburi
2008	Thailand	Prapol Pongpanich	Provincial Electricity Authority
2009	Thailand	Attaphol Buspakom	Muangthong United
2010	Belgium	René Desaeyere	Muangthong United
2011	Thailand	Attaphol Buspakom (2)	Buriram United
2012	Serbia	Slaviša Jokanović	Muangthong United
2013	Spain	Alejandro Menéndez	Buriram United
2014	Brazil	Alexandre Gama	Buriram United
2015	Brazil	Alexandre Gama (2)	Buriram United
2016	Thailand	Totchtawan Sripan	Muangthong United
2017	Montenegro	Božidar Bandović	Buriram United
2018	Montenegro	Božidar Bandović (2)	Buriram United
2019	Brazil	Ailton dos Santos Silva	Chiangrai United
2020–21	Thailand	Dusit Chalermsan	BG Pathum United
2021–22	Japan	Masatada Ishii	Buriram United
2022–23	Japan	Masatada Ishii (2)	Buriram United
2023–24	Brazil	Jorginho Campos	Buriram United
2024–25	Brazil	Osmar Loss	Buriram United
2025–26	England	Mark Jackson	Buriram United

=== By individual ===
Key
*	Manager is currently active

Thai football championship-winning managers by individual
Rank	Manager	Nat.	Titles	Club(s)	Winning seasons
1	Piyapong Pue-on	(Thailand)	2	Royal Thai Air Force	1997, 1999
1	Attaphol Buspakom	(Thailand)	2	Muangthong United, Buriram United	2009, 2011
1	Alexandre Gama *	(Brazil)	2	Buriram United	2014, 2015
1	Božidar Bandović	(Montenegro)	2	Buriram United	2017, 2018
1	Masatada Ishii	(Japan)	2	Buriram United	2021–22, 2022–23
6	Witthaya Laohakul	(Thailand)	1	Bangkok Bank	1996–97
6	Karoon Narksawat	(Thailand)	1	Sinthana	1998
6	Jason Withe	(England)	1	BEC Tero Sasana	2000
6	Pichai Pituwong	(Thailand)	1	BEC Tero Sasana	2001–02
6	Narong Suwannachot	(Thailand)	1	Krung Thai Bank	2002–03
6	Worrawoot Dangsamer	(Thailand)	1	Krung Thai Bank	2003–04
6	Jose Alves Borges*	(Brazil)	1	Thailand Tobacco Monopoly	2004–05
6	Somchai Subpherm	(Thailand)	1	Bangkok University	2006
6	Jadet Meelarp *	(Thailand)	1	Chonburi	2007
6	Prapol Pongpanich	(Thailand)	1	PEA	2008
6	René Desaeyere	(Belgium)	1	Muangthong United	2010
6	Slaviša Jokanović *	(Serbia)	1	Muangthong United	2012
6	Alejandro Menéndez	(Spain)	1	Buriram United	2013
6	Totchtawan Sripan *	(Thailand)	1	Muangthong United	2016
6	Ailton dos Santos Silva	(Brazil)	1	Chiangrai United	2019
6	Dusit Chalermsan *	(Thailand)	1	BG Pathum United	2020–21
6	Jorginho Campos	(Brazil)	1	Buriram United	2023–24
6	Osmar Loss *	(Brazil)	1	Buriram United	2024–25
6	Mark Jackson *	(England)	1	Buriram United	2025–26

=== By nationality ===
Country	Managers	Total
Thailand	12	14
Brazil	5	6
England	2	2
Montenegro	1	2
Belgium	1	1
Spain	1	1
Serbia	1	1
Japan	1	2

== See also ==
- List of foreign Thai League 1 managers
