= List of Thai football champions =

The Thai football champions are the winners of the highest league in Thai football, which is currently the Thai League 1. Teams in bold are those who won the double of League Championship and Thai FA Cup, or the Asian Double of League Championship and AFC Champions League in that season.

Football was introduced into Thailand in 1897. In 1916, King Vajiravudh founded "The Football Association of Thailand under Patronage of His Majesty the King." After that the association joined the FIFA in 1925 and AFC in 1957.

The Thailand national football team competed at the 1956 Olympics

The first football stadium, Suphachalasai Stadium, was built in 1935. King's Cup, the first football cup was introduced in 1968. And then two years later, Queen's Cup, a national cup competition, started in 1970.

== List of champions ==
=== Semi-professional era (1916–1995) ===
==== Kor Royal Cup (1916–1995) ====
Kor Royal Cup was Thailand's premier football competition from 1916 to 1995 and was played as a semi-professional knockout tournament.

Season	Winner
1916	Department of Performing Arts
1917	Vajiravudh College
1918	Vajiravudh College
1919	Vajiravudh College
1920	Chulalongkorn University
1921	Royal Military Academy
1922	Royal Military Academy
1923	Royal Thai Naval Academy
1924	Royal Thai Naval Academy
1925	Cancelled
1926	Kong Dern Rot
1927	Kong Dern Rot
1928	Suankularb Wittayalai School
1929	Suankularb Wittayalai School
1930	Assumption Academy
1931	Thailand Post
1932-47	Cancelled
1948	Bang Rak Academy
1949	Assumption Academy
1950	Cancelled
1951	Chai Sod
1952	Royal Thai Air Force
1953	Royal Thai Air Force

Season	Winner
1954	Hakka Association of Thailand
1955	Chula-Alumni Association
1956	Hainan Association of Thailand
1957	Royal Thai Air Force
1958	Royal Thai Air Force
1959	Royal Thai Air Force
1960	Royal Thai Air Force
1961	Royal Thai Air Force
1962	Royal Thai Air Force
1963	Royal Thai Air Force
1964	Bangkok Bank
1965	Royal Thai Police
1966	Bangkok Bank
1967	Bangkok Bank †; Royal Thai Air Force †
1968	Port Authority of Thailand
1969	Raj Vithi
1970	Raj Pracha
1971	Raj Pracha
1972	Port Authority of Thailand
1973	Raj Vithi
1974	Port Authority of Thailand
1975	Raj Vithi

Season	Winner
1976	Port Authority of Thailand
1977	Raj Vithi
1978	Port Authority of Thailand
1979	Port Authority of Thailand
1980	Raj Pracha
1981	Bangkok Bank
1982	Raj Pracha
1983	Royal Thai Army
1984	Bangkok Bank
1985	Port Authority of Thailand
1986	Bangkok Bank
1987	Royal Thai Air Force
1988	Krung Thai Bank
1989	Krung Thai Bank
1990	Port Authority of Thailand
1991	Thai Farmers Bank
1992	Thai Farmers Bank
1993	Thai Farmers Bank
1994	Bangkok Bank
1995	Thai Farmers Bank

† Shared

=== Early Professional era (1996–2008) ===
Thai League was introduced in 1996 by the Football Association of Thailand (FAT) under the name Thailand Soccer League.

==== Thailand Soccer League (1996–1997) ====
Season	Champions (number of titles)	Runners-up	Third place	Leading goalscorer	Goals
1996–97	Bangkok Bank	Stock Exchange of Thailand	-	Ampon Ampansuwan (TOT)	21
1997	Royal Thai Air Force	Sinthana	Bangkok Bank	Worrawoot Srimaka (BEC Tero Sasana)	17

==== Thai Premier League (1998–2000) ====
Season	Champions (number of titles)	Runners-up	Third place	Leading goalscorer	Goals
1998	Sinthana	Royal Thai Air Force	BEC Tero Sasana	Ronnachai Sayomchai (Port Authority)	23
1999	Royal Thai Air Force (2)	Port Authority	BEC Tero Sasana	Sutee Suksomkit (Thai Farmers Bank)	13
2000	**BEC Tero Sasana**	Royal Thai Air Force	Thai Farmers Bank	Sutee Suksomkit (Thai Farmers Bank)	16

==== Thai League (2001–2005) ====
Season	Champions (number of titles)	Runners-up	Third place	Leading goalscorer	Goals
2001–02	BEC Tero Sasana (2)	Osotspa	Bangkok Bank	Worrawoot Srimaka (BEC Tero Sasana); Pitipong Kuldilok (Port Authority)	12
2002–03	Krung Thai Bank	BEC Tero Sasana	Port Authority	Sarayoot Chaikamdee (Port Authority)	12
2003–04	Krung Thai Bank (2)	BEC Tero Sasana	Osotspa	Vimol Jankam (Osotsapa)	14
2004–05	Tobacco Monopoly	PEA	Osotspa	Supakit Jinajai (PEA); Sarayoot Chaikamdee (Port Authority)	10

==== Thailand Premier League (2006–2008) ====
In 2007, Thai League was integrated with the semi-professional Provincial League.

Season	Champions (number of titles)	Runners-up	Third place	Leading goalscorer	Goals
2006	Bangkok University	Osotspa	BEC Tero Sasana	Pipat Thonkanya (BEC Tero Sasana)	12
2007	Chonburi	Krung Thai Bank	BEC Tero Sasana	Ney Fabiano (Tobacco Monopoly)	18
2008	PEA	Chonburi	BEC Tero Sasana	Anon Sangsanoi (BEC Tero Sasana)	20

=== Modern Professional era (2009–present) ===
In 2009, FAT established Thai Premier League Co., Ltd., while clubs in the top league were required to complete the AFC Club License Criteria and consequently had to separate themselves from their parent organizations to register as independent football entities.

==== Thai Premier League (2009–2015) ====
Season	Champions (number of titles)	Runners-up	Third place	Leading goalscorer	Goals
2009	Muangthong United	Chonburi	Bangkok Glass	Anon Sangsanoi (BEC Tero Sasana)	18
2010	Muangthong United (2)	Buriram PEA	Chonburi	Kengne Ludovick (Pattaya United)	17
2011	**Buriram PEA** (2)	Chonburi	Muangthong United	Franck Ohandza (Buriram PEA)	19
2012	Muangthong United (3)	Chonburi	BEC Tero Sasana	Cleiton Silva (BEC Tero Sasana); Teerasil Dangda (Muangthong United)	24
2013	**Buriram United** (3)	Muangthong United	Chonburi	Carmelo González (Buriram United)	23
2014	Buriram United (4)	Chonburi	BEC Tero Sasana	Heberty (Ratchaburi)	26
2015	Buriram United (5)	Muangthong United	Suphanburi	Diogo (Buriram United)	33

==== Thai League (2016) ====
Season	Champions (number of titles)	Runners-up	Third place	Leading goalscorer	Goals
2016	Muangthong United (4)	Bangkok United	Bangkok Glass	Cleiton Silva (Muangthong United)	27

==== Thai League 1 (2017–present) ====
In 2017, FAT rebranded the Thai Premier League as Thai League 1 in an effort to strengthen the league's international identity and elevate its global profile.

Season	Champions (number of titles)	Runners-up	Third place	Leading goalscorer	Goals
2017	Buriram United (6)	Muangthong United	Bangkok United	Dragan Bošković (Bangkok United)	38
2018	Buriram United (7)	Bangkok United	Port	Diogo (Buriram United)	34
2019	Chiangrai United	Buriram United	Port	Lonsana Doumbouya (Trat)	20
2020–21	BG Pathum United	Buriram United	Port	Barros Tardeli (Samut Prakan City)	25
2021–22	**Buriram United** (8)	BG Pathum United	Bangkok United	Hamilton Soares (Nongbua Pitchaya)	19
2022–23	**Buriram United** (9)	Bangkok United	Port	Supachai Chaided (Buriram United)	19
2023–24	Buriram United (10)	Bangkok United	Port	Supachai Chaided (Buriram United)	21
2024–25	**Buriram United** (11)	Bangkok United	BG Pathum United	Guilherme Bissoli (Buriram United)	25
2025–26	Buriram United (12)	Port	Ratchaburi		

Italic indicates Double winners - i.e. League and Thai FA Cup winners OR League and Asian Cup winners or League and League Cup

Bold indicates Treble Winners - i.e. League, Thai FA Cup and Asian Cup winners OR League, Thai FA Cup and League Cup

An asterisk (*) after the number of titles won indicates that the team either set or equalled the overall record for championships won in the relevant season.

== Total titles won ==
Clubs in bold compete in the Thai League 1 as of the 2025–26 season. Italics indicates defunct clubs.

=== Modern professional era (2009–present) ===
Club	Champions	Runners-up	Winning seasons	Runners-up seasons
**Buriram United**	11	3	2011, 2013, 2014, 2015, 2017, 2018, 2021–22, 2022–23, 2023–24, 2024–25, 2025–26	2010, 2019, 2020–21
Muangthong United	4	3	2009, 2010, 2012, 2016	2013, 2015, 2017
**BG Pathum United**	1	1	2020–21	2021–22
**Chiangrai United**	1	0	2019	
**Bangkok United**	0	5		2016, 2018, 2022–23, 2023–24, 2024–25
**Chonburi**	0	4		2009, 2011, 2012, 2014
**Port**	0	1		2025–26

=== All-time league era (1996–present) ===
Club	Champions	Runners-up	Winning seasons	Runners-up seasons
**Buriram United**	12	4	2008, 2011, 2013, 2014, 2015, 2017, 2018, 2021–22, 2022–23, 2023–24, 2024–25, 2025–26	2004–05, 2010, 2019, 2020–21
Muangthong United	4	3	2009, 2010, 2012, 2016	2013, 2015, 2017
Air Force United	2	2	1997, 1999	1998, 2000
Police Tero	2	2	2000, 2001–02	2002–03, 2003–04
Krung Thai Bank	2	1	2002–03, 2003–04	2007
**Bangkok United**	1	5	2006	2016, 2018, 2022–23, 2023–24, 2024–25
**Chonburi**	1	5	2007	2008, 2009, 2011, 2012, 2014
BBCU	1	1	1998	1997
**BG Pathum United**	1	1	2020–21	2021–22
Bangkok Bank	1	0	1996–97	
**Chiangrai United**	1	0	2019	
Thailand Tobacco Monopoly	1	0	2004–05	
**Port**	0	2		1999, 2025–26
Super Power Samut Prakan	0	2		2001–02, 2006
RBAC	0	1		1996–97

== Total titles won by province ==
=== Modern professional era (2009–present) ===
Province	Number of titles	Clubs
Buriram	11	Buriram United (11)
Nonthaburi	4	Muangthong United (4)
Chiangrai	1	Chiangrai United (1)
Pathum Thani	1	BG Pathum United (1)

=== All-time league era (1996–present) ===
Province	Number of titles	Clubs
Buriram	11	Buriram United (11)
Bangkok	9	Royal Thai Air Force (2), BEC Tero Sasana (2), Krung Thai Bank (2), Bangkok Bank (1), Sinthana (1), Bangkok United (1)
Nonthaburi	4	Muangthong United (4)
Samut Sakhon	1	Tobacco Monopoly (1)
Chonburi	1	Chonburi (1)
Phra Nakhon Si Ayutthaya	1	PEA (1)
Chiangrai	1	Chiangrai United (1)
Pathum Thani	1	BG Pathum United (1)

== Total titles won by region ==
=== Modern professional era (2009–present) ===
Region	Number of titles	Clubs
Northeast	11	Buriram United (11)
Bangkok Metropolitan	5	Muangthong United (4), BG Pathum United (1)
Northern	1	Chiangrai United (1)
Central (excluding Bangkok Metropolitan)	0	
Eastern	0	
Western	0	
Southern	0	

=== All-time league era (1996–present) ===
Region	Number of titles	Clubs
Northeast	11	Buriram United (11)
Bangkok Metropolitan	9	Muangthong United (4), Royal Thai Air Force (2), BEC Tero Sasana (2), Krung Thai Bank (2), Bangkok Bank (1), Sinthana (1), Tobacco Monopoly (1), Bangkok United (1), BG Pathum United (1)
Eastern	1	Chonburi (1)
Central (excluding Bangkok Metropolitan)	1	PEA (1)
Northern	1	Chiangrai United (1)
Western	0	
Southern	0	

== See also ==
- Thai football league system
- Football in Thailand
