= Thai League Coach of the Year =

In the Thai League T1, the Thai League Coach of the Year Award is an annual award given to a head coach who is recognised for their overall contribution to the achievements of a specific team.

== Winners ==
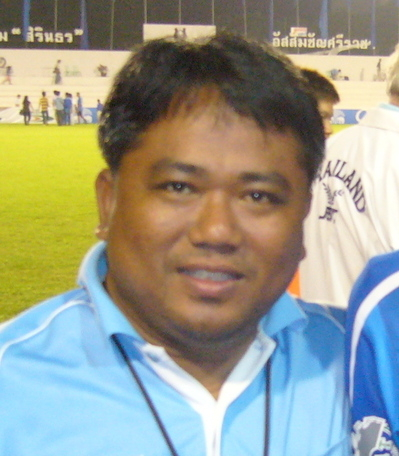
Jadet Meelarp, one-time winner

Year	Nationality	Manager	Club	Notes	Ref(s)
1996-97	Thailand	Withaya Laohakul	Bangkok Bank	Winning a first Thai Premier League title.	
1997	Thailand	Piyapong Pue-on	Royal Thai Air Force	Winning a first Thai Premier League title.	
1998	Thailand	Karoon Narksawat	Sinthana		
1999	Thailand	Piyapong Pue-on	Royal Thai Air Force	Winning a second title in three years.	
2000	Thailand	Pichai Pituwong	BEC Tero Sasana	Winning a Double champions.	
2001-02	Thailand	Attaphol Buspakom	BEC Tero Sasana		
2002-03	Thailand	Narong Suwannachote	Krung Thai Bank		
2003-04	Thailand	Worrawoot Dangsamer	Krung Thai Bank		
2004-05	Brazil	José Alves Borges	Thailand Tobacco Monopoly		
2006	Thailand	Somchai Subpherm	Bangkok University		
2007	Thailand	Jadet Meelarp	Chonburi	Winning a first Thai Premier League title.	
2008	Thailand	Prapol Pongpanich	Provincial Electricity Authority		
2009	Thailand	Attaphol Buspakom	Muangthong United	Winning a title after promoted.	
2010	Belgium	René Desaeyere	Muangthong United		
2011	Thailand	Attaphol Buspakom	Buriram PEA		
2012	Serbia	Slaviša Jokanović	Muangthong United	Winning without losing	
2013	Thailand	Attaphol Buspakom	Bangkok Glass F.C.		
2014	Japan	Masahiro Wada	Chonburi		
2015	Brazil	Alexandre Gama	Buriram United		
2017	Thailand	Totchtawan Sripan	Muangthong United		
2018	Montenegro	Božidar Bandović	Buriram United		
2019	Brazil	Ailton dos Santos Silva	Chiangrai United		
2020-21	Thailand	Surachai Jaturapattarapong	BG Pathum United		
