= List of foreign Thai League 1 managers =

This is a list of the foreign managers (head coaches) in Thai League 1 during the professional era which began in 1996. The following manager:

1. have coached in at least one Thai League T1 official game for the respective club;
2. are sorted by the nationality. Coaches from the same country are sorted by the year of appointment.

== Australia ==
- Andrew Ord – BEC Tero Sasana – 2012
- Aurelio Vidmar – Bangkok Glass, BG Pathum United, Bangkok United – 2016–2017, 2021, 2022
- Matt Smith – BG Pathum United – 2022–2023
- Arthur Papas – Buriram United – 2023–2024

== Belgium ==
- René Desaeyere – Muangthong United, BEC Tero Sasana, Ratchaburi– 2010, 2013, 2018
- Stéphane Demol – BEC Tero Sasana – 2013

== Brazil ==
- Jose Alves Borges – TTM, Muangthong United, BEC Tero Sasana, Chiangrai United, Muangthong United – 2004-2006, 2013-2014, 2019, 2026
- Carlos Roberto de Carvalho – Bangkok Glass, Muangthong United, Police United – 2010-2011, 2014
- Freddy Marinho – Sisaket – 2010
- Reuter Moreira – Esan United, TOT – 2012, 2015
- Alexandré Pölking– Army United, Suphanburi, Bangkok United– 2013-2020
- Alexandre Gama – Buriram United, Chiangrai United, Muangthong United, Lamphun Warriors, Port, Uthai Thani – 2014—2016(1), 2020—2021(2), 2016—2018, 2019—2020, 2022—
- Stefano Cugurra Teco – Osotspa, Navy – 2014—2016
- Sérgio Farias–Suphanburi– 2015, 2016-2017
- Sérgio Alexandre – Suphanburi – 2016
- Ailton Silva– Chiangrai United, Chiangmai United– 2019, 2021-2022
- Carlos Eduardo Parreira – Chiangmai, Khon Kaen United, Rayong – 2018-2019, 2021-2022, 2024
- Arthur Bernardes – Rayong – 2020
- Emerson Pereira – Chiangrai United, Nongbua Pitchaya, Buriram United – 2020-2022, 2022—2023, 2024
- Gabriel Magalhães – Chiangrai United – 2023—2024
- Douglas Cardozo – Ratchaburi – 2023
- Jorginho Campos – Buriram United – 2024
- Osmar Loss – Buriram United – 2024–2025
- Wilson James Dos Santos – Chiangrai United – 2025
- Wanderley – Lamphun Warriors – 2025

== Bulgaria ==
- Velizar Popov – Suphanburi, Sisaket – 2014,2017

== Chile ==
- Jorge Enrique Amaya – BEC Tero Sasana – 2010

== Croatia ==
- Dragan Talajić – Muangthong United – 2014–2016
- Drago Mamić -Chainat Hornbill - 2017-2018
- Mario Ivanković – Muangthong United – 2025–2026

== England ==
- Jason Withe – BEC Tero Sasana, Bangkok Bank F.C., Songkhla United – 1999–2001, 2003–2005, 2014
- Robbie Fowler – Muangthong United – 2011
- Dave Booth – BEC Tero Sasana, Sisaket – 2006, 2011
- Peter Butler – BEC Tero Sasana – 2011
- Phil Stubbins – Police United, Bangkok Glass – 2012–2013
- Scott Cooper – Buriram United, Muangthong United, Ubon UMT United F.C., Port – 2013–2014, 2017, 2022
- Gary Stevens – Army United, Port – 2014–2015
- Peter Withe – PTT Rayong – 2014
- Mike Mulvey – BEC Tero Sasana - 2017
- Kevin Blackwell – Nakhon Ratchasima – 2022–2023
- Mark Jackson – Buriram United – 2025–

== Finland ==
- Mika Lönnström – Police United, Saraburi – 2014, 2015
- Mixu Paatelainen – Ubon UMT United – 2018

== France ==
- Regis Laguesse – BEC Tero Sasana – 2007
- Christophe Larrouilh – BEC Tero Sasana – 2008-2009

== Germany ==
- Peter Stubbe – BEC Tero Sasana – 1996
- Hans Emser – Bangkok Glass – 2009
- Winfried Schäfer – Muangthong United – 2013
- Franz Schwarzwälder – Songkhla United – 2013
- Christian Ziege - Ratchaburi - 2018
- Goran Barjaktarević – Chonburi – 2018
- Dennis Amato - Chainat Hornbill F.C., Sukhothai, Lamphun Warriors - 2016–2019, 2022–2023, 2025–

== Iran ==
- Afshin Ghotbi – Buriram United – 2016

== Italy ==
- Marco Simone – Ratchaburi - 2019
- Gino Lettieri – Muangthong United, Uthai Thani – 2024–2025

== Japan ==
- Masahiro Wada – Chonburi, Port – 2014, 2015
- Koichi Sugiyama – BBCU, Chainat– 2016
- Sugao Kambe – Nakhon Ratchasima, Ubon UMT United, Sukhothai – 2013–2016, 2018, 2023–2024
- Tetsuya Murayama – Samut Prakan City – 2019
- Masami Taki – Chiangrai United, Rayong, PT Prachuap – 2020-2021
- Masatada Ishii – Samut Prakan City, Buriram United, BG Pathum United – 2019–2023, 2025–2026
- Yasushi Yoshida – Samut Prakan City – 2021–2022
- Makoto Teguramori – BG Pathum United, Chonburi – 2022(1), 2023–2024(2), 2023
- Mitsuo Kato – BG Pathum United – 2022

== Malaysia ==
- Tan Cheng Hoe – Police Tero – 2024

== Montenegro ==
- Božidar Bandović – Buriram United(1),BEC Tero Sasana, Sisaket, Buriram United(2), PT Prachuap – 2014–2020, 2023
- Vladimir Vujović – BG Pathum United – 2025, 2026–

== Netherland (Netherlands) ==
- Henk Wisman – Chiangrai United – 2013

== Northern Ireland ==
- Kenny Shiels – BEC Tero Sasana – 2015

== Nigeria ==
- Adebayo Gbadebo – Suphanburi– 2017-2022

== North Macedonia ==
- Mario Gjurovski – Muangthong United – 2020–2023

== Portugal ==
- Henrique Calisto – Muangthong United – 2011
- Rui Bento – Bangkok United – 2014
- Manuel Cajuda – BEC Tero Sasana – 2015
- Bruno Pereira – Ratchaburi Mitr Phol – 2022

== Scotland ==
- Matt Elliott – Army United – 2014

== Serbia ==
- Slaviša Jokanović – Muangthong United – 2012–2013
- Miloš Joksić – Pattaya United, Nakhon Ratchasima, Muangthong United, Uthai Thani – 2016–2019, 2023–2024, 2024–2026
- Branko Smiljanić – BEC Tero Sasana – 2016
- Ranko Popović – Buriram United– 2016–2017
- Radovan Ćurčić – Muangthong United – 2018
- Ljubomir Ristovski – Navy, Sukhothai – 2018–2019
- Srdan Trailovic – Khon Kaen United – 2024

== Singapore ==
- Akbar Nawas – Nakhon Pathom United – 2023–2024

== Spain ==
- Ivan Palanco – Ratchaburi – 2013
- Alejandro Menéndez – Buriram United – 2013
- Ricardo Rodríguez – Ratchaburi, Bangkok Glass, Suphanburi – 2013–2015, 2016
- Josep Ferré – Ratchaburi – 2015
- Pacheta – Ratchaburi– 2016–2017
- Manolo Márquez – Ratchaburi – 2018–2019
- Xavi Moro – Ratchaburi, Chiangrai United – 2022–2023, 2024
- Carlos Peña – Ratchaburi – 2023–2024
- Joaquín Gómez – Kanchanaburi Power – 2025

== South Korea ==
- Kim Kyung-Ju – Sisaket – 2010
- Bae Myung-Ho – TTM – 2011
- Lee Young-moo – TTM – 2011
- Kim Hak-chul-Pattaya United – 2016
- Yoon Jong-hwan – Muangthong United – 2019
- Lee Jung-soo – Kanchanaburi Power – 2026

== Sweden ==
- Sven-Göran Eriksson – BEC Tero Sasana – 2012
- Mikael Stahre – Uthai Thani – 2023–2024

== Tunisia ==
- Lassaad Chabbi – Ratchaburi – 2018

== United States of America ==
- Anthony Hudson – BG Pathum United – 2025

== Wales ==
- Jason Brown - Air Force Central- 2018-2019
- Matthew Mark Holland – Port – 2022-2023

== See also ==
- List of Thai League 1 managers
