= 2009 Thai Premier League =

Thai Premier League
- Season: 2009
- Champions: Muangthong United
- Relegated: Sriracha; Chula United; Nakhon Pathom
- 2010 AFC Champions League: Muangthong United
- 2010 AFC Cup: Thai Port
- Top goalscorer: (Thailand) Anon Sangsanoi (BEC Tero Sasana) (18)
- Biggest home win: BEC Tero Sasana 5-0 Chula United
- Biggest away win: Rajnavy Rayong 0-3 TTM Samut Sakhon; Sriracha 0-3 Thai Port; Chonburi 2-5 Muangthong United; TOT 1-4 BEC Tero Sasana; BEC Tero Sasana 1-4 Muang Thong United; Samut Songkhram 0-3 Rajnavy Rayong; Osotspa Saraburi 0-3 BEC Tero Sasana; Nakhon Pathom 2-5 Bangkok Glass
- Highest scoring: Chonburi 2-5 Muangthong United; Nakhon Pathom 2-5 Bangkok Glass (7)
- Highest attendance: Muangthong United 1–1 Chonburi (16,608) (4 October 2009)

The Thai Premier League 2009 was the thirteenth season of the Premier League since its establishment in 1996. A total of 16 teams competed in the league, with PEA FC as the defending champions.

Muang Thong United took the league championship with two games remaining, the first ever team to win the championship in their debut appearance in the top flight.

Nakhon Pathom, Sriracha and Chula United were relegated to the 1st Division.

== Rules ==
- Teams play each other twice on a home and away basis
- 3 Points for a win
- 1 Points for a draw
- At beginning of the season the league winner plays the FA Cup winner in the Kor Royal Cup
- Loser qualifies for Asian Champions League Qualification Round
- Teams finishing on same points at the end of the season use toe-to-toe record to determine finishing position.
- Bottom 10 teams are relegated to Thai Division 1 League

== Member clubs and locations ==
Locations of the 2009 Thai Premier League teams

Club Name	Year Joined	Province	Home Stadium	Capacity	Notes
PEA	2004/05	Ayutthaya	Ayutthaya Province Central Stadium	6,000	AFC Champions League 2009
Chonburi	2006	Chonburi	Princess Sirindhorn Stadium	5,000	AFC Cup 2009
BEC Tero Sasana	1996/97	Bangkok	BEC Tero Sasana Nong Chok Stadium	5,000	
Osotspa Saraburi	1996/97	Pathum Thani	Thanarom Village Football Field	?	
TOT	1996/97	Kanchanaburi	Klip Bua Stadium	16,000	
Bangkok Glass ^{1}	2009	Pathum Thani	Chaloem Phra Kiat Stadium (Khlong 6)	5,000	
Samut Songkhram	2008	Samut Songkhram	Samut Songkhram Province Stadium	5,000	
Chula United	1996/97	Bangkok	Chulalongkorn University Stadium	25,000	
Nakhon Pathom	2007	Nakhon Pathom	Kasetsat Kamphengsaen University Stadium	4,000	
Bangkok United ^{2}	2003/04	Bangkok	Thai-Japanese Stadium	10,320	
Pattaya United ^{1}	2009	Chonburi	Nongprue Municipality Football Field	5,000	
TTM Samut Sakhon ^{3}	1996/97	Samut Sakhon	Institute of Physical Education Samut Sakhon Stadium	6,378	
Thai Port ^{4}	1996/97	Bangkok	PAT Stadium	5,000	
Muang Thong United	2009	Nonthaburi	Thunderdome Sport Complex	16,000	Promoted from Division 1
Sriracha	2009	Chonburi	Princess Sirindhorn Stadium	5,000	Promoted from Division 1
Rajnavy Rayong ^{5}	1996/97	Rayong	Rayong Province Central Stadium	17,000	Promoted from Division 1

Football clubs in Bangkok Metropolitan Region

^{1} Pattaya United and Bangkok Glass took the places of Coke Bangpra and Krung Thai Bank after purchasing the clubs. Coke Bangpra and Krung Thai Bank therefore withdrew from the league allowing Pattaya and Bangkok Glass to take position in the top flight.

^{2} Changed name from Bangkok University

^{3} Changed name from Thailand Tobacco Monopoly

^{4} Changed name from Port Authority of Thailand.

^{5} Changed name from Royal Thai Navy

== Managerial changes ==
Team	Outgoing manager	Manner of departure	Replaced by	Date of appointment	Position in table
Chonburi	Jadet Meelarp	End of Contract	Kiatisuk Senamuang	January 2009	Pre season
Chula United	Kiatisuk Senamuang	End of Contract	Carlos Ferreira	January 2009	Pre season
TTM Samut Sakhon	Prajuk Viengsong	End of Contract	Attaphol Puspakom	January 2009	Pre season
Muang Thong United	Surasak Tansurat	Taking charge of club's junior sides	Attaphol Puspakom	April 2009	4th
TTM Samut Sakhon	Attaphol Puspakom	Moved to Muang Thong United	Kij Meesrisuk	April 2009	11th
PEA FC	Prapol Pongpanich	Resigned due to fan pressure	Thongsuk Sampahungsith	May 2009	12th
Bangkok Glass FC	Hans R. Emser	Was acting coach and is now Technical Director Youth Football Academy Bangkok Glass FC	Surachai Jaturapattarapong	June 2009	1st
Pattaya United	Pansak Ketwattha	Resigned	Wisoon Wichaya	June 2009	13th
BEC Tero Sasana	Christophe Larrouilh	Resigned to become the team's Technical Director	Tawan Sripan	June 2009	5th
Pattaya United	Wisoon Wichaya	Short term replacement	Jadet Meelarp	June 2009	13th
Chula United	Carlos Ferreira	Resigned	Pichai Pituwong	August 2009	16th
TTM Samut Sakhon	Kij Meesrisuk	Release	Prajuk Viengsong	August 2009	12th
Nakhon Pathom FC	Chatchai Paholpat	Release	Piyapong Piew-on	September 2009	14th

== League table ==
Pos	Team	Pld	W	D	L	GF	GA	GD	Pts	Qualification or relegation
1	Muang Thong United (Note: Promoted from last season)	30	19	8	3	48	20	+28	65	2010 AFC Champions League Qualifying play-off
2	Chonburi	30	18	8	4	50	30	+20	62	
3	Bangkok Glass	30	16	8	6	45	31	+14	56	
4	BEC Tero Sasana	30	15	6	9	53	34	+19	51	
5	Osotspa Saraburi	30	13	8	9	36	32	+4	47	
6	Thai Port	30	12	8	10	33	30	+3	44	2010 AFC Cup Group stage (Note: Thai Port qualified for the AFC Cup as Thai FA Cup winners)
7	TOT	30	10	12	8	33	33	0	42	
8	TTM Samut Sakhon	30	8	13	9	29	32	−3	37	
9	PEA (Note: Defending Champion)	30	9	9	12	37	41	−4	36	
10	Samut Songkhram	30	9	7	14	22	31	−9	34	
11	Pattaya United	30	7	11	12	27	33	−6	32	
12	Rajnavy Rayong	30	8	6	16	28	39	−11	30	
13	Bangkok United	30	5	15	10	24	34	−10	30	
14	Sriracha	30	8	6	16	28	34	−6	30	Relegation to 2010 Thai Division 1 League
15	Chula United	30	4	14	12	29	47	−18	26	Relegation to 2010 Thai Division 1 League
16	Nakhon Pathom	30	6	7	17	32	53	−21	25	Relegation to 2010 Thai Division 1 League

Updated to match(es) played on October 18, 2009. Source:
Rules for classification: 1) points; 2) goal difference; 3) number of goals scored.

== Season notes ==
Clubs outside the area of Bangkok

Clubs from the greater area of Bangkok

- Before the starting of 2009 seasons, Thailand Premier League changed the official name to Thai Premier League.
- Coke Bangpra sold their Thai Premier League slot to a newly formed club, Pattaya United at the end of the Thai Premier League 2008 season. Coke Bangpra therefore withdrew from the Thai football league system and Pattaya would start their life in the very top division.
- Provincial Electricity Authority were drawn against Singapore Armed Forces of Singapore in the opening game of the AFC Champions League 2009 and were defeated 4-1 after extra time.
- On December 30, 2008, Thailand confirmed that Denmark, North Korea and Lebanon would play in the 2009 King's Cup tournament. Thailand would open up against Lebanon to determine who would enter the final.
- Thailand came runners up in the 2009 King's Cup, defeated by Denmark on penalties in the final.
- Chonburi won the season opening Kor Royal Cup, defeating PEA 1-0.
- In May, Chonburi progressed to the Round of 16 stage in the AFC Cup, whilst PEA got knocked out in the Group Stages.
- In June, FAT confirmed that the FA Cup would be restarted and the winners would enter the AFC Cup 2010.
- Osotspa M-150 changed their name mid-season to Osotspa Saraburi
- BEC defeated TSW Pegasus FC of Hong Kong in the TSW Pegasus Anniversary Cup

== Results ==
Home \ Away	TP	PEA	PU	CU	CHO	RR	TOT	MTU	BG	NP	BTS	TSS	BU	SRI	SS	OS
1. Thai Port		0–1	1–0	1–0	1–2	2–1	0–0	1–0	1–0	1–1	0–1	0–1	0–0	3–0	1–0	2–1
2. PEA	2–2		4–1	2–2	2–2	4–1	0–2	1–2	1–2	3–2	2–0	0–0	2–0	0–2	2–2	0–1
3. Pattaya Utd	1–1	2–0		2–1	0–0	1–0	0–1	1–1	2–2	1–0	0–0	4–0	2–0	1–1	0–0	1–1
4. Chula Utd	0–2	3–1	1–1		1–1	1–1	1–1	1–1	1–2	1–3	1–2	1–1	0–0	1–0	0–0	1–2
5. Chonburi	2–1	3–0	2–0	2–2		2–1	2–1	2–5	1–3	3–0	1–0	2–2	5–1	3–2	2–0	1–0
6. Rajnavy Rayong	1–2	1–1	3–2	1–1	0–1		0–3	1–2	0–1	1–1	0–0	0–3	0–1	1–0	2–0	2–1
7. TOT	1–2	1–1	3–1	3–0	0–0	2–1		0–0	2–1	2–1	1–4	1–1	1–1	1–0	0–1	1–2
8. Muang Thong Utd	3–0	1–0	1–0	2–1	1–1	2–1	3–0		1–0	3–1	2–0	0–0	2–2	0–0	3–1	2–1
9. Bangkok Glass	1–1	3–1	2–1	4–2	1–0	1–0	1–1	1–0		1–0	3–3	2–0	2–1	1–0	2–1	0–0
10. Nakhon Pathom	2–0	1–1	3–1	2–2	1–2	2–1	3–1	1–1	2–5		1–0	1–2	1–3	1–3	0–1	0–1
11. BEC Tero Sasana	3–1	0–1	3–1	5–0	1–2	2–1	4–0	1–4	1–1	3–0		3–0	0–0	3–2	2–0	2–3
12. TTM Samut Sakhon	2–1	1–0	0–0	1–1	2–1	1–1	1–1	0–2	2–1	4–0	1–2		2–2	0–0	0–1	0–0
13. Bangkok Utd	2–2	0–2	0–0	0–1	1–1	0–1	1–1	1–2	1–1	0–0	1–1	2–1		1–0	0–1	1–2
14. Sriracha	0–3	2–0	0–1	0–1	0–1	0–1	1–1	0–1	2–0	2–0	4–2	1–0	0–0		1–2	2–2
15. Samut Songkhram	0–0	0–1	1–0	3–0	0–1	0–3	0–1	0–1	1–1	1–1	1–2	1–0	1–1	2–0		0–2
16. Osotsapa	2–1	2–2	1–0	1–1	1–2	0–1	0–0	1–0	2–0	3–1	0–3	1–1	0–1	1–3	2–1	

Updated to match(es) played on October 18, 2009. Source: Football Association of Thailand website
Legend: Blue = home team win; Yellow = draw; Red = away team win.

== Season statistics ==
=== Top scorers ===
Last updated October 18, 2009

Scorer	Goals	Club
(Thailand) Anon Sangsanoi	18	BEC Tero Sasana
(Ivory Coast) Kone Mohamed	14	Chonburi
(Thailand) Nantawat Tansopa	11	Bangkok Glass
(Nigeria) Ajayi Samuel	10	Bangkok Glass
(Ivory Coast) Dango Siaka	10	Muang Thong United
(Thailand) Pipat Thonkanya	10	Thai Port
(Thailand) Arthit Sunthornpit	9	Chonburi
(Thailand) Sarayoot Chaikamdee	9	Osotsapa M-150
(Thailand) Sompong Soleb	9	Chula United
(Ivory Coast) Soumahoro Yaya	9	Muang Thong United
(Thailand) Suriya Domtaisong	9	Muang Thong United (2 goals); PEA (7 goals)
(Wales) Michael Byrne	8	Nakhon Pathom (4 goals); Chonburi (4 goals)
(Thailand) Suttinan Nontee	8	Rajnavy Rayong
(Brazil) Anderson	7	Chonburi (3 goals); Pattaya United (4 goals)
(Cameroon) Bekombo Ekollo	7	TTM Samut Sakhon
(Thailand) Chakrit Buathong	7	BEC Tero Sasana
(Thailand) Chatprapob Usaprom	7	TTM Samut Sakhon
(Thailand) Chatree Chimtalay	7	Bangkok Glass
(Thailand) Jirawat Makarom	7	Thai Port
(Argentina) Raúl González Gastón	7	Sriracha
(Thailand) Teerasil Dangda	7	Muang Thong United

=== Hat-tricks ===
Key
^{4}	Player scored four goals
^{5}	Player scored five goals

Player	Nationality	For	Against	Result^{[a]}	Date
Sompong Soleb	Thailand	Chula United	PEA	3–1	12 September 2009
Anon Sangsanoi	Thailand	BEC Tero Sasana	TOT	4–0	7 October 2009
Nantawat Tansopa	Thailand	Bangkok Glass	Nakhon Pathom	5–2	18 October 2009

== Annual awards ==
=== Coach of the Year ===
- (Thailand) Attaphol Buspakom - Muang Thong United

=== Defender of the Year ===
- (Thailand) Jetsada Jitsawad - Muang Thong United

=== Midfielder of the Year ===
- (Thailand) Kittipol Paphunga - BEC Tero Sasana

=== Striker of the Year ===
- (Thailand) Pipat Thonkanya - Thai Port

=== Young Player of the Year ===
- (Thailand) Kabfah Boonmatoon - Osotsapa M-150

=== Top scorer ===
- (Thailand) Anon Sangsanoi - BEC Tero Sasana

== See also ==
- 2009 Thai Division 1 League
- 2009 Regional League Division 2
- 2009 Thai FA Cup
- 2009 Kor Royal Cup
