= 1998 Thai Premier League =

Thai Premier League
- Season: 1998
- Dates: 2 May – 3 October
- Champions: Sinthana
- Relegated: UCOM Raj Pracha
- 1999–2000 Asian Club Championship: Sinthana
- 1999–2000 Asian Cup Winners Cup: Bangkok Bank FC
- Top goalscorer: Ronnachai Sayomchai (Port Authority of Thailand) (23)

The 1998 Thai Premier League consisted of 12 teams. The bottom club would be relegated to the Thailand Division 1 League. The club that came 11th would play in a relegation / promotion match against the club that came second in the Thailand Division 1 League

Defending Champions Royal Thai Air Force should have entered the next edition of the Asian Club Championship, but refused due to lack of funding. BEC Tero Sasana took their place.

The league was also known as the Caltex Premier League.

== Member clubs locations ==
- Bangkok Bank
- BEC Tero Sasana (Tero Sasana)
- Sinthana
- Krung Thai Bank (promoted from Division 1)
- Osotsapa M-150 (promoted from Division 1)
- Port Authority of Thailand
- UCOM Raj Pracha
- Bangkok Metropolitan Administration
- Royal Thai Air Force
- Royal Thai Army
- Thai Farmers Bank
- TOT
Locations of the Thai Premier League 1998 teams

== Final league table ==
Pos	Team	Pld	W	D	L	GF	GA	GD	Pts	Qualification or relegation
1	Sinthana	22	13	3	6	37	28	+9	42	Champion and Qualification for the 1999–2000 Asian Club Championship
2	Royal Thai Air Force (Note: Defending champion)	22	10	10	2	52	31	+21	40	
3	BEC Tero Sasana	22	10	8	4	47	23	+24	38	
4	Port Authority	22	10	7	5	50	27	+23	37	
5	Bangkok Bank	22	6	13	3	33	27	+6	31	
6	TOT	22	8	6	8	36	37	−1	30	
7	Royal Thai Army	22	7	5	10	35	42	−7	26	
8	Thai Farmers Bank	22	5	10	7	33	37	−4	25	
9	Krung Thai Bank (Note: Promoted from last season)	22	6	4	12	24	37	−13	22	
10	Osotsapa	22	4	9	9	22	47	−25	21	
11	Bangkok Metropolitan	22	4	8	10	30	37	−7	20	Qualification for the promotion/relegation playoff
12	UCOM Raj Pracha	22	4	7	11	28	50	−22	19	Relegation spot

Source: rsssf.com
Rules for classification: 1st points; 2nd head-to-head; 3rd goal difference; 4th goals scored

== Promotion and relegation Playoff ==
The club that came 11th would play in a relegation / promotion match against the runner-up in the Thailand Division 1 League.

January 24 and January 31, 1998

Team 1	Result	Team 2
† Bangkok Metropolitan Administration	3-1	Assumption Sriracha

† Bangkok Metropolitan Administration remain at the Thai Premier League.

== Season notes ==
- The bottom club would be relegated, with the team coming 11th, to play in a relegation / promotion matchup against the 2nd placed team in Thailand Division 1 League.
- UCOM Raj Pracha were relegated and replaced by 2nd level winners Bangkok Bank of Commerce.
- Bangkok Metropolitan Administration overcame Assumption Sriracha in the playoff match.
- Tero Sasana changed the club's name again to BEC Tero Sasana with the main sponsor, Thailand’s Entertainment giant "BEC Tero Entertainment."

== Queens Cup ==
The Singha sponsored Queen's Cup was postponed because of lack of sponsorship, will be held next year but with reduced prize money.

== Thailand FA Cup ==
Bangkok Bank won the 1998 Thailand FA Cup, and their 3rd victory in this competition. It is unclear whom they beat in the final

== Yamaha Thailand Cup ==
1998 saw the 14th edition of the Yamaha Thailand Cup.

It was Thailand's main inter-provincial competition, played between qualifiers from various regions.

The first round saw four groups of four teams, of which the top two sides qualified for the Quarter-Final knockout stage.

Bangkok Metropolitan Administration beat Nakhon Si Thammarat in the final.

== Asian Representation ==
- BEC Tero Sasana represented Thailand in the 1998–99 Asian Club Championship, where they would reach the second round, beaten by Chinese opposition in Dalian Wanda, the same club who ended Bangkok Bank's adventure the previous year.
- Sinthana made the second round of the 1998–99 Asian Cup Winners Cup, where they were out classed by Japanese opposition in Kashima Antlers.

== Annual awards ==
=== Coach of the Year ===
- (Thailand) Karoon Narksawat - Sinthana

=== Player of the Year ===
- (Thailand) Niweat Siriwong - Sinthana

=== Top scorer ===
- Ronnachai Sayomchai - 23 Goals Port Authority of Thailand

== Champions ==
The champion for the 1998 season was Sinthana. It was the team's first title.

Preceded by Thailand Soccer League; 1997	Thai Premier League; 1998; Sinthana	Succeeded by Thai Premier League; 1999
