= Raywat Meerian =

Thai footballer

Personal information
- Full name: Raywat Meerian
- Date of birth: 24 February 1980 (age 46)
- Place of birth: Thailand
- Position: Striker

Youth career
- Krung Thai Bank

Senior career*
Years	Team	Apps	(Gls)
2008–2009	Krung Thai Bank		
2010–2012	Rajpracha		
2013–2014	Sriracha		
2013	→ Paknampho NSRU (loan)		
2015	Rayong		
2016	Rajpracha		
- * Club domestic league appearances and goals as of 14 November 2008

Raywat Meerian is a retired professional footballer from Thailand.

He played for Krung Thai Bank FC in the 2008 AFC Champions League group stages.

== Asian Champions League Appearances ==
#	Date	Venue	Opponent	Score	Result
1.	April 23, 2008	Hanoi, Vietnam	Nam Dinh	2-2	Draw
