= 1997 Thailand Soccer League =

Thai Premier League
- Season: 1997
- Dates: 11 May 1997 – 5 January 1998
- Champions: Royal Thai Air Force
- Relegated: Royal Thai Police; Royal Thai Navy
- 1998–99 Asian Club Championship: BEC Tero Sasana FC
- 1998–99 Asian Cup Winners Cup: Sinthana
- Top goalscorer: (Thailand) Worrawoot Srimaka (BEC Tero Sasana) (17)
- Biggest home win: Port Authority of Thailand 5-1 Royal Thai Army
- Biggest away win: Bangkok Bank 0-4; Sinthana
- Highest scoring: Sinthana 5-4; Thai Farmers Bank (9 goals)

The 1997 Thai Premier League consisted of 12 teams. The bottom club would be relegated to the Thailand Division 1 League. The club that came 11th would play in a relegation / promotion match against the club that came second in the Thailand Division 1 League

Defending Champions Bangkok Bank would enter the next edition of the Asian Club Championship.

The league was also known as the Johnnie Walker Thailand Soccer League 1997.

== Member clubs locations ==
Locations of the 1997 Thailand Soccer League teams
- Bangkok Bank
- Bangkok Metro Administration (rename from Stock Exchange of Thailand FC)
- Tero Sasana (Singha Tero Sasana)
- Sinthana
- Royal Thai Police
- Port Authority of Thailand
- UCOM Raj Pracha
- Royal Thai Air Force
- Royal Thai Army
- Royal Thai Navy
- Thai Farmers Bank
- TOT

== Final league table ==
Pos	Team	Pld	W	D	L	GF	GA	GD	Pts	Qualification or relegation
1	Royal Thai Air Force	22	14	3	5	45	23	+22	45	Champion
2	Sinthana	22	13	3	6	32	25	+7	42	
3	Bangkok Bank (Note: Defending champion)	22	11	5	6	34	23	+11	38	
4	Port Authority	22	9	5	8	36	35	+1	32	
5	Tero Sasana	22	8	7	7	32	26	+6	31	Qualification for the 1998–99 Asian Club Championship (substitution)
6	Thai Farmers Bank	22	7	9	6	31	31	0	30	
7	Bangkok Metro	22	8	5	9	22	21	+1	29	
8	TOT	22	8	5	9	32	33	−1	29	
9	Royal Thai Army	22	7	4	11	31	45	−14	25	
10	UCOM Raj Pracha	22	6	6	10	26	32	−6	24	
11	Royal Thai Police	22	4	10	8	19	25	−6	22	Qualification for the promotion/relegation playoff
12	Royal Thai Navy	22	3	6	13	20	41	−21	15	Relegation spot

Source: rsssf.com
Rules for classification: 1st points; 2nd head-to-head; 3rd goal difference; 4th goals scored

== Promotion/relegation playoff ==
The club that came 11th would play in a relegation / promotion match against the runner-up in the Thailand Division 1 League

February 17 and February 20, 1998

Team 1	Result	Team 2
Royal Thai Police	0-1	† Osotsapa

† Royal Thai Police relegated to the Thailand Division 1 League and Osotsapa promoted to the Thai Premier League in next season.

== Season Notes ==
- Royal Thai Air Force were docked three points at the end of season for refusing to play Sinthana in Suphan Buri earlier this season.
- Singha Tero Sasana changed the club's name to Tero Sasana.
- Tero Sasana represented Thailand in the 1998–99 Asian Club Championship following withdrawals by Royal Thai Air Force, Bangkok Bank and Port Authority of Thailand, all for economic reasons; Sinthana qualifier for the 1998–99 Asian Cup Winners Cup after winning the Singha FA Cup.
- Last year's runners-up, Stock Exchange of Thailand, played as Bangkok Metropolitan Administration (BMA) owing to a change in sponsorship.

== Queen's Cup ==
Thai Farmers Bank won and retained the Queen's Cup trophy for the 4th year running. This was the 26th edition of the competition.

For the first time, no foreign teams took part, owing to the poor economic situation.

Thawan Thammaniyai of Thai Farmers Bank won the Most Valuable Player award.

== Thailand FA Cup ==
Sinthana FC won the Thailand FA Cup for the first time, but it is unclear whom they beat in the final.

== Asian Representation ==
- Bangkok Bank represented Thailand in the 1997–98 Asian Club Championship, where they would fail in the first round, beaten by Chinese opposition in Dalian Wanda.
- Royal Thai Air Force made the second round of the 1997–98 Asian Cup Winners Cup, where they were beaten by near neighbours PSM Ujungpandang of Indonesia after beating Melaka Telekom of Malaysia in the first round.

== Annual awards ==
=== Coach of the Year ===
- (Thailand) Piyapong Piew-on - Royal Thai Air Force

=== Player of the Year ===
- (Thailand) Seksan Piturat - Sinthana

=== Top scorer ===
- (Thailand) Worrawoot Srimaka - 17 Goals BEC Tero Sasana

== Champions ==
The league champion was Royal Thai Air Force. It was the team's first title.

Preceded by Thailand Soccer League; 1996–97	Thai Premier League; 1997; Royal Thai Air Force	Succeeded by Thai Premier League; 1998
