= Worrawoot Srimaka =

Thai footballer and manager (born 1971)

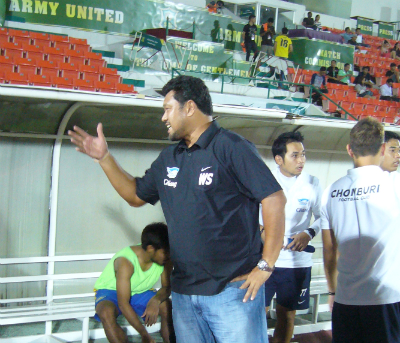
- Srimaka as Chonburi manager in 2013

Personal information
- Full name: Worrawoot Srimaka
- Date of birth: 8 December 1971 (age 54)
- Place of birth: Songkhla, Thailand
- Height: 1.94 m (6 ft 4 1/2 in)
- Position: Striker

Team information
- Current team: Ratchaburi (head coach)

Youth career
- 1987–1989: Suankularb Wittayalai School
- 1989–1990: Thai Farmers Bank

Senior career*
Years	Team	Apps	(Gls)
1991–1995	Thai Farmers Bank	71	(24)
1996–2004	BEC Tero Sasana	119	(55)
2004–2005	Hoa Lâm Bình Định	12	(4)
2005–2006	Kelantan FA	29	(19)
2007	Chonburi	14	(1)
2008	Customs Department	18	(3)
2009	Chula United	5	(0)
Total		256	(112)

International career
1991–2002	Thailand	63	(29)

Managerial career
- 2010: Pathum Thani
- 2011: Songkhla
- 2012: Suphanburi
- 2013–2014: Chonburi
- 2015: Suphanburi (interim)
- 2017: Suphanburi (interim)
- 2016: Thailand U21
- 2016–2017: Thailand U23
- 2017: Thailand (assistant)
- 2017–2018: Thailand U23 (assistant)
- 2018: Thailand U21
- 2018: Thailand U23
- 2019: Kasetsart
- 2020: MOF Customs United
- 2021: Sisaket
- 2021–2022: Thailand U23
- 2022–2023: Kasetsart
- 2023: Nakhon Si United
- 2023–2024: Police Tero (technical director)
- 2023–2024: Police Tero (interim)
- 2024–: Ratchaburi
Medal record
Representing Thailand
SEA Games
Silver medal – second place	Manila 1991	Team
Gold medal – first place	Chiang Mai 1995	Team
Gold medal – first place	Jakarta 1997	Team
Gold medal – first place	Bandar Seri Begawan 1999	Team
AFF Championship
Gold medal – first place	Singapore 1996	Team
Gold medal – first place	Thailand 2000	Team
Gold medal – first place	Indonesia-Singapore 2002	Team
- * Club domestic league appearances and goals

Worrawoot Srimaka (Thai: วรวุฒิ ศรีมะฆะ) is a Thai professional football manager and former player. He was a striker who scored 29 goals for the Thailand national football team. He is currently the head coach of the Thai League 1 club, Ratchaburi.

== Club career ==
His career began in 1991 with Thai Farmers Bank. He won the Thai League three times, AFC Champions League twice and the Queen's Cup once. In 1996, he moved to BEC Tero Sasana and won two Thai League titles. In 2003, his team reached the final of the AFC Champions League, losing to Al Ain. He was the top scorer in the 2001–02 Thai League. In the 2002–03 season, he went to Malaysia to play for Kelantan FA and then joined Hoa Lâm Bình Định in Vietnam in 2004. In the 2005 AFC Champions League, he scored a goal against a Thai club, Krung Thai Bank. He returned to Thailand to play for Chonburi and left for Customs Department in the summer of 2008. He ended his career with Chula United, whom he joined in 2009.

== International career ==
He won the 2000 AFF Championship with Thailand and scored a hat-trick to clinch a decisive 4–1 win over Indonesia in the final. With 5 goals, he was also one of the tournament's two top scorers, along with Indonesia's Gendut Doni Christiawan.

== International goals ==
#	Date	Venue	Opponent	Score	Result	Competition
1.	4 July 1996	Bangkok, Thailand	Maldives	8–0	Won	1996 AFC Asian Cup qualification
2.	9 September 1996	Singapore	Brunei	6–0	Won	1996 Tiger Cup
3.	9 September 1996	Singapore	Brunei	6–0	Won	1996 Tiger Cup
4.	13 September 1996	Singapore	Vietnam	4–2	Won	1996 Tiger Cup
5.	5 October 1997	Jakarta, Indonesia	Myanmar	2–1	Won	1997 Southeast Asian Games
6.	7 October 1997	Jakarta, Indonesia	Brunei	6–0	Won	1997 Southeast Asian Games
7.	27 August 1998	Ho Chi Minh City, Vietnam	Myanmar	1–1	Draw	1998 Tiger Cup
8.	29 August 1998	Ho Chi Minh City, Vietnam	Philippines	3–1	Won	1998 Tiger Cup
9.	5 September 1998	Ho Chi Minh City, Vietnam	Indonesia	4–5 (pen.)	Lost	1998 Tiger Cup
10.	21 November 1998	Bangkok, Thailand	Turkmenistan	3–3	Drew	Friendly
11.	2 December 1998	Bangkok, Thailand	Hong Kong	5–0	Won	1998 Asian Games
12.	4 December 1998	Bangkok, Thailand	Oman	2–0	Won	1998 Asian Games
13.	10 December 1998	Bangkok, Thailand	Lebanon	1–0	Won	1998 Asian Games
14.	30 July 1999	Bandar Seri Begawan, Brunei	Philippines	9–0	Won	1999 Southeast Asian Games
15.	10 June 2000	Bangkok, Thailand	Qatar	2–3	Lost	Friendly
16.	10 November 2000	Chiang Mai, Thailand	Indonesia	4–1	Won	2000 Tiger Cup
17.	10 November 2000	Chiang Mai, Thailand	Indonesia	4–1	Won	2000 Tiger Cup
18.	18 November 2000	Bangkok, Thailand	Indonesia	4–1	Won	2000 Tiger Cup
19.	18 November 2000	Bangkok, Thailand	Indonesia	4–1	Won	2000 Tiger Cup
20.	18 November 2000	Bangkok, Thailand	Indonesia	4–1	Won	2000 Tiger Cup
21.	23 January 2001	Bangkok, Thailand	Kuwait	5–4	Won	Friendly
22.	29 September 2001	Bangkok, Thailand	Oman	2–0	Won	Friendly
23.	29 September 2001	Bangkok, Thailand	Oman	2–0	Won	Friendly
24.	16 October 2001	Bangkok, Thailand	Bahrain	1–1	Draw	2002 FIFA World Cup qualification
25.	18 December 2002	Singapore	Laos	5–1	Won	2002 Tiger Cup
26.	18 December 2002	Singapore	Laos	5–1	Won	2002 Tiger Cup
27.	22 December 2002	Singapore	Singapore	1–1	Draw	2002 Tiger Cup
28.	27 December 2002	Jakarta, Indonesia	Vietnam	4–0	Won	2002 Tiger Cup

== Managerial statistics ==
As of match played 21 November 2026

Managerial record by team and tenure
Team	Nat.	From	To	Record								Ref.
Team	Nat.	From	To	G	W	D	L	GF	GA	GD	Win %	Ref.
Thailand U21	(Thailand)	5 May 2016	3 April 2017	1	1	0	0	2	0	+2	100.00	
Suphanburi	(Thailand)	28 June 2016	4 July 2016	2	0	1	1	1	3	−2	0.00	
Suphanburi	(Thailand)	17 April 2017	14 May 2017	6	3	2	1	13	8	+5	50.00	
Thailand U23	(Thailand)	August 2017	August 2017	7	6	1	0	12	1	+11	85.71	
Thailand U23	(Thailand)	13 February 2018	27 August 2018	6	1	2	3	6	9	−3	16.67	
Thailand U21	(Thailand)	13 February 2018	27 August 2018	1	0	1	0	0	0	+0	0.00	
Kasetsart	(Thailand)	8 January 2019	30 November 2019	34	10	10	14	40	43	−3	29.41	
Customs United	(Thailand)	18 November 2019	14 November 2020	14	4	4	6	14	19	−5	28.57	
Sisaket	(Thailand)	22 December 2020	21 July 2021	17	6	5	6	24	23	+1	35.29	
Thailand U23	(Thailand)	25 August 2021	30 June 2022	9	2	3	4	12	11	+1	22.22	
Kasetsart	(Thailand)	30 June 2022	27 February 2023	26	6	10	10	32	31	+1	23.08	
Nakhon Si United	(Thailand)	16 March 2023	25 May 2023	8	1	3	4	7	14	−7	12.50	
Police Tero	(Thailand)	9 November 2023	26 February 2024	10	2	1	7	13	28	−15	20.00	
Ratchaburi	(Thailand)	19 November 2024	Present	86	47	12	27	183	110	+73	54.65	
Career Total				227	89	55	83	359	300	+59	39.21	

== Honours ==
=== Player ===
Thailand

- SEA Games Gold medal: 1995, 1997, 1999. Silver medal: 1991
- AFF Championship Winner: 1996, 2000, 2002
- Asian Games 4th; 1998
- King's Cup Winner: 1994, 2000

Thai Farmers Bank

- AFC Champions League Champions: 1994, 1995
- Thai League 1 Champions: 1991, 1992, 1993, 1995
- Queen's Cup Champions: 1994, 1995
- Afro-Asian Club Championship Champions: 1994

BEC Tero Sasana

- AFC Champions League Runner-up: 2002
- Thai League T1 Champions: 2000, 2001

Chonburi FC

- Thai League 1 Champions: 2007

Individual

- AFF Championship top scorer: 2000
- Thai Premier League top scorer: 1997, 2001–02

=== Manager ===
Thailand U23

- SEA Games Gold medal: 2017
- Dubai Cup Winner: 2016

Thailand U21

- Nations Cup Winner: 2016

Suphanburi F.C.

- Thai Division 1 League runner-up: 2012

Individual

- Thai League 1 Coach of the Month: January 2025
