= Wisoot Wichaya =

Thai football coach

Personal information
- Full name: Wisoot Wichaya
- Place of birth: Thailand

Managerial career
- Years: Team
- 1995–2000: Bangkok Bank (assistant manager)
- 2001–2002: Bangkok Bank
- 2008: Bangkok Bank
- 2010: Sisaket
- 2011: Buriram
- 2013: Navy
- 2014: Ayutthaya
- ‡ National team caps and goals as of 02:21, 31 January 2018 (UTC)

Wisoot Wichaya (also Visuth Vichaya) is a Thai football coach. He was formerly the coach of Bangkok Bank FC and has also coached the national under-23 team at the 2006 Asian Games.

Preceded by	Bangkok Bank FC head coach 2008–present	Succeeded by
