= 14th Yamaha Thailand Cup =

1998 saw the 14th edition of the Yamaha Thailand Cup.

It was Thailand's main inter-provincial competition, played between qualifiers from various regions.

The first round saw four groups of four teams, of which the top two sides qualified for the Quarter-Final knockout stage.

Bangkok Metropolitan Administration FC beat Nakhon Si Thammarat FC in the final.

== Group A ==
- Bangkok Metropolitan Administration FC
- Phatthalung
- Amnat Charoen
- Pathum Tani

Results

March 16, 1998

| Bangkok Metropolitan Administration FC | 2 – 2 4-3 pens | Phatthalung |

March 16, 1998

| Amnat Charoen | 2 – 2 5 – 4 pens | Pathum Thani |

March 22, 1998

| Bangkok Metropolitan Administration FC | 2 – 0 | Pathum Thani |

Bangkok Metropolitan Administration FC and Amnat Charoen advance to Quarter-Final stage.

== Group B ==
- Phetchaburi
- Pichit
- Nakhon Sri Thammarat FC
- Ubon Ratchathani

Results

March 20, 1998

| Phetchaburi | 3 – 1 | Pichit |

March 20, 1998

| Nakhon Si Thammarat FC | – - | Ubon Ratchathani |

Nakhon Si Thammarat FC and Phetchaburi advanced to the next round

== Group C ==
- Ayutthaya
- Si Saket FC
- Phitsanulok FC
- Sa Kaeo

Results

March 17, 1998

| Ayutthaya | 5 – 2 | Si Saket FC |

March 17, 1998

| Phitsanulok FC | 3 – 3 4-3 pens | Sa Kaeo |

Ayutthaya and Phitsanulok FC advanced to the next round

== Group D ==
- Tak
- Lopburi FC
- Samut Songkhram FC
- Ranong
