= Pansak Ketwattha =

Thai football coach (born 1956)

Personal information
- Full name: Pansak Ketwattha
- Date of birth: December 14, 1956 (age 69)
- Place of birth: Si Racha, Chonburi, Thailand

Managerial career
- Years: Team
- 2007–2009: Pattaya United
- ‡ National team caps and goals as of June 28, 2008

Pansak Ketwattha is a Thai football coach. In 2009, he coached Thailand Premier League side Pattaya United F.C. His father is Somjet Ketwattha who was club chairman of Coke-Bangpra until the takeover by Pattaya United. Pansak lead Coke-Bangpra to promotion to the Premier League after coming second in Division One in 2007

== Clubs managed ==
- Pattaya United - 2007–2009

== Honours ==
- 2007 Thai Division One League Runner Up with Coke-Bangpra
