= 2008 Thailand Premier League =

Thai Premier League
- Season: 2008
- Champions: Provincial Electricity Authority
- Relegated: Bangkok Bank; Customs Department; Royal Thai Army
- 2009 AFC Champions League: PEA
- 2009 AFC Cup: Chonburi
- Top goalscorer: (Thailand) Anon Sangsanoi (BEC Tero Sasana) (20)
- Biggest home win: Chula-Sinthana 5-0 Port Authority of Thailand
- Biggest away win: Tobacco Monopoly 1-4 Krung Thai Bank; Customs Department 1-4 Bangkok University; Port Authority of Thailand 2-5 BEC Tero Sasana
- Highest scoring: Chula-Sinthana 6-2 BEC Tero Sasana (8 goals)

The 2008 Thai Premier League had 16 teams. It was the twelfth since its establishment. The first matches of the season were played on 18 February 2008, and the season ended on 11 October 2008. Three teams would be relegated to Thailand Division 1 League. The Champion in this season would qualify for the 2009 AFC Champions League qualification stage and the runner-up would be enter the 2009 AFC Cup. The official name of the league at this time was Thailand Premier League.

Provincial Electricity Authority won their first championship after they moved their home stadium from Bangkok to Ayutthaya, where they have a bigger fan base.

This season was the last for a grear team of Thai football, Bangkok Bank: the club were originally relegated after they were defeated by Chonburi in the final match of the season, but folded before the start of the 2009 season.

Defending champions Chonburi were pipped to the title after faltering against newly promoted Samut Songkhram in the second to last game of the season. Samut finished in a creditable seventh place, while Chula United who also impressed in their first season back in the top flight to finish eighth.

Customs Department FC, the other newly promoted club, were relegated in their first season.

== Rules ==
- Teams play each other twice on a home and away basis
- 3 Points for a win
- 1 Point for a draw
- At end of the season the winners play the runners ups in the Kor Royal Cup
- Winner qualifies for Asian Champions League Qualification Round
- Runner-Up enters AFC Cup
- Teams finishing on same points at the end of the season use head-to-head record to determine finishing position.
- Bottom three teams are relegated to Thailand Division 1 League

== Member clubs ==
- Bangkok Bank
- Bangkok University
- BEC Tero Sasana
- Chonburi
- Chula-Sinthana † (promoted from Division 1 Winner Group B)
- Coke-Bangpra (promoted from Division 1 Runner Up Group A)
- Customs Department (promoted from Division 1 Winner Group A)
- Krung Thai Bank
- Nakhon Pathom
- Osotsapa M-150
- Port Authority of Thailand
- PEA
- Royal Thai Army
- Samut Songkhram (promoted from Division 1 Runner Up Group B)
- Thailand Tobacco Monopoly
- TOT

† Chula-Sinthana changed to "Chula United" from August 2008 season

== Stadium and locations ==
Locations of the Thai Premier League 2008 teams

Team	Location	Stadium	Capacity	Ref.
Bangkok Bank	Bangkok	Bangkok Bank football field	?	
Bangkok University	Pathum Thani	Bangkok University Stadium (Rangsit)	4,000	
BEC Tero Sasana	Nong Chok, Bangkok	BEC Tero Sasana Nong Chok Stadium	?	
Chula-Sinthana	Bangkok	Chulalongkorn University Stadium	20,000	
Chonburi	Chonburi	Chonburi Municipality Stadium	?	
Coke-Bangpra	Chonburi	Chonburi Municipality Stadium	?	
Customs Department	Min Buri, Bangkok	Kasem Bundit University Stadium (Rom Klao)	?	
Krung Thai Bank	Bangkok	Chulalongkorn University Stadium	20,000	
Nakhon Pathom	Nakhon Pathom	Sanam Chan Palace Sports Stadium	6,000	
Osotsapa M-150	Bang Kapi, Bangkok	Klong Chan Sports Center	?	
Port Authority of Thailand	Bangkok	Thai-Japanese Stadium	?	
PEA	Ayutthaya	Ayutthaya Province Central Stadium	?	
Royal Thai Army	Bangkok	Thai Army Sports Stadium	?	
Samut Songkhram	Samut Songkhram	Samut Songkhram Province Stadium	?	
Thailand Tobacco Monopoly	Samut Sakhon	Institute of Physical Education Samut Sakhon Stadium	?	
TOT	Nonthaburi	Namkaejon Stadium	?	

Football clubs in Bangkok Metropolitan Region

== Managerial changes ==
Team	Outgoing manager	Manner of departure	Replaced by	Date of appointment	Position in table
BEC Tero Sasana	(France) Regis Laguesse	Sacked	(France) Christophe Larrouilh	February 2008	3rd
Customs Department	(Thailand) Prapas Chamrasamee	Resigned	(Thailand) Chatchai Paholpat	July 2008	Postseason (16th)
Thailand Tobacco Monopoly	(Thailand) Gawin Kachendecha	Became manager of Thailand national under-20 football team	(Thailand) Prajak Weangsong	July 2008	Postseason (12th)

== League table ==
Pos	Team	Pld	W	D	L	GF	GA	GD	Pts	Qualification or relegation
1	PEA	30	18	7	5	38	15	+23	61	Champion and Qualification for the 2009 AFC Champions League
2	Chonburi (Note: Defending Champion)	30	15	14	1	34	14	+20	59	Qualification for the 2009 AFC Cup
3	BEC Tero Sasana	30	16	7	7	50	31	+19	55	
4	Osotsapa M-150	30	13	12	5	37	25	+12	51	
5	TOT	30	13	11	6	36	27	+9	50	
6	Krung Thai Bank	30	13	7	10	47	36	+11	46	
7	Samut Songkhram (Note: Promoted from last season)	30	11	10	9	35	31	+4	43	
8	Chula-Sinthana (Chula United)	30	10	9	11	47	41	+6	39	
9	Nakhon Pathom	30	11	4	15	24	38	−14	37	
10	Bangkok University	30	9	8	13	28	36	−8	35 (Note: Head to Head: Bangkok Univ win 2-1)	
11	Coke-Bangpra	30	8	11	11	24	27	−3	35	
12	Tobacco Monopoly	30	7	12	11	20	25	−5	33	
13	Port Authority	30	7	9	14	30	47	−17	30	
14	Bangkok Bank	30	6	11	13	23	35	−12	29	Club folded at end of season
15	Royal Thai Army	30	6	7	17	21	44	−23	25	Relegated
16	Customs Department	30	5	5	20	18	39	−21	20	Relegated

Rules for classification: 1st points; 2nd head-to-head; 3rd goal difference; 4th goals scored

== Season notes ==
- The Thai Premier League took a break between May 3 and June 28 due to national team world cup qualification matches in June
- On the 17 May, a Thai Premier League XI beat an experimental Manchester City team 3-1, in a Friendly match.
- It was announced this year that Thai clubs would no longer have direct entry into the Asian Champions League, they would have to play in a playoff match against other ASEAN members to enter the new format. Thai clubs would get one spot in the AFC Cup, potentially joined by another if unsuccessful in the playoff spot for the Champions League.
- National coach Charnwit Polcheewin announced on the 16th June 2008, that he would resign as Thailand National team manager.
- National team coach Charnwit Polcheewin formally resigned on June 25 after he failed to steer the national side to the fourth stage of World Cup qualification. Charnwit help the side win two King's Cup tournaments and runner up in the 2007 ASEAN Football Championship.
- The National team failed to progress past the third stage of the World Cup Qualifying campaign. They overcame lowly Macau and Yemen in the earlier rounds, but came bottom of the four team group stage.
- On July 1, 2008, the 2011 AFC Asian Cup qualification draw was made. Thailand got drawn into Group E with Iran, Jordan and ASEAN neighbours Singapore. Thailand were second seed in the draw process. The first matchday would be away to Jordan on January 14, 2009
- Peter Reid was confirmed as the new national team coach on July 23. Earlier reports had suggested that Holger Osieck was also in the running, but pulled out to leave Reid as the sole candidate. Reid would start his new role on September 1.
- On July 23, new national team coach Peter Reid was also put in charge on the Thailand national under-20 football team. Reid's first task was to prepare them for the forthcoming AFC Youth Championship to be played in Saudi Arabia in October 2008.
- At the beginning of August, Chula-Sinthana changed their club name officially to "Chula United".
- On August 27 Thailand were drawn in Group B of the 2008 AFF Suzuki Cup. Their opponents in the first round are; Vietnam, Malaysia and a qualifier from the Qualification phase.
- On September 4 Thailand announced that their new national team colour would be Yellow, changing from the previous Red home kit. Blue would continue to be used as the second kit. Yellow represents the Monarch. The change of kit colour was approved by FIFA.
- Customs Department were relegated to the Thailand Division 1 League on September 20.
- Muang Thong NongJork United was promoted from Thailand Division 1 League on September 21.
- Sriracha and Royal Thai Navy were promoted to the Premier League from Thailand Division 1 League on September 28.
- Royal Thai Army were relegated to the Thailand Division 1 League on October 1 without kicking a ball, due to Port Authority of Thailand beating Bangkok University in a rescheduled match.
- PEA were crowned champions on October 11. Bangkok Bank FC were relegated to the Thailand Division 1 League on the same day
- The national team came runners up to Vietnam in the 2008 AFF Suzuki Cup, losing 3-2 in the two match final.

== Asian Representation ==
- Chonburi & Krung Thai Bank both took part in the 2008 AFC Champions League campaign. Both sides failed to make it out of their tough Group Stages. This was Chonburi's first season in Asian Competition.
- Bangkok University and Thailand Tobacco Monopoly entered the Singapore Cup. Both teams made the Quarter-Final stage, where 'The Students' got beat by Young Lions 1-0 over two legs, conceding in the last minute of the first leg, whereas Thailand Tobacco Monopoly would get beat 4-2 on penalties by Woodlands Wellington.

== Results ==
Home \ Away	PAT	PEA	CKB	CHS	CHO	ARM	TOT	BKB	KTB	NPA	BEC	TOB	BKU	CUS	SSK	OSO
Port Authority of Thailand		0–2	0–0	2–2	1–3	1–0	0–1	0–0	2–2	2–0	2–5	0–0	2–1	1–1	2–1	1–2
Provincial Electricity Authority	1–0		2–1	2–0	0–0	2–0	1–1	2–0	2–1	4–0	1–3	2–1	1–1	1–0	1–0	0–0
Coke-Bangpra	1–1	1–4		2–3	0–1	0–1	2–1	1–0	1–0	1–0	1–1	3–0	1–2	1–0	1–1	0–0
Chula	5–0	0–0	2–0		0–0	3–1	2–0	1–1	2–2	1–2	6–2	1–1	5–1	0–0	0–2	0–1
Chonburi	0–0	1–0	0–0	4–1		1–1	2–2	0–0	1–1	0–0	0–1	1–0	2–1	2–0	0–0	1–1
Army	2–1	0–1	2–1	3–2	0–0		0–2	0–3	0–2	1–2	2–3	1–1	1–1	0–2	1–2	1–3
TOT	3–1	2–0	0–2	2–1	1–1	0–0		2–1	1–0	3–2	2–3	0–0	2–1	1–0	1–1	0–0
BKK Bank	2–1	0–4	0–0	1–3	1–2	2–0	0–0		3–4	1–1	1–1	0–0	1–1	1–0	0–1	0–0
Krung Thai	1–0	1–1	1–1	0–1	0–2	3–1	4–1	2–0		2–0	0–0	1–2	2–0	2–0	0–1	2–3
N Pathom	2–0	1–0	0–1	2–1	0–2	1–0	0–2	2–0	1–1		0–2	0–2	0–0	1–0	1–0	1–2
BEC tero	1–2	1–0	1–0	5–1	0–1	0–1	1–1	2–1	3–2	3–1		0–1	3–0	2–0	1–1	2–1
Tobacco	2–3	0–1	0–0	0–0	0–0	0–0	0–2	1–0	1–4	2–0	0–0		0–1	1–0	3–0	1–1
BKK Univ	0–1	0–1	0–0	1–0	2–3	0–2	0–2	0–0	1–2	1–2	1–0	1–0		1–0	0–0	2–2
Customs	3–2	0–1	1–0	0–0	0–1	1–0	0–0	1–2	1–2	0–1	0–3	2–1	1–4		2–3	2–3
S Songkhram	3–1	0–0	2–1	2–0	1–2	4–0	1–1	1–2	1–3	2–0	1–1	0–0	0–2	2–1		1–3
Osotsapa	1–1	0–1	1–1	2–4	0–1	0–0	1–0	2–0	3–0	2–1	1–0	1–0	0–1	0–0	1–1	

Legend: Blue = home team win; Yellow = draw; Red = away team win.

== Top scorers ==
Scorer	Goals	Team
(Thailand) Anon Sangsanoi	20	BEC Tero Sasana
(Thailand) Ronnachai Rangsiyo	16	Provincial Electricity Authority
(Thailand) Sarayoot Chaikamdee	12	Osotsapa M-150
(Thailand) Teerathep Winothai	12	BEC Tero Sasana
(Thailand) Wuttichai Tathong	12	Chula-Sinthana (Chula United)
(Ivory Coast) Kone Kassim	10	Krung Thai Bank
(Nigeria) Ajayi Gdenga Samuel	9	Krung Thai Bank
(Thailand) Pipat Thonkanya	9	Provincial Electricity Authority
(Thailand) Sompong Soleb	9	Chula-Sinthana (Chula United)
(Thailand) Phuwadol Sankla	8	TOT
(Thailand) Suriya Domtaisong	8	Bangkok University

== Annual awards ==
=== Coach of the Year ===
- (Thailand) Prapol Pongpanich - PEA

=== Goalkeeper of the Year ===
- (Thailand) Sinthaweechai Hathairattanakool - Chonburi

=== Defender of the Year ===
- (Thailand) Nattaporn Phanrit - Chonburi

=== Midfielder of the Year ===
- (Thailand) Narongchai Vachiraban - PEA

=== Striker of the Year ===
- (Thailand) Teeratep Winothai - BEC Tero Sasana

=== Young Player of the Year ===
- (Thailand) Ronnachai Rangsiyo - PEA

=== Top scorer ===
- (Thailand) Anon Sangsanoi - BEC Tero Sasana

== Champions ==
The league champion was PEA. It was the team's first title.

== See also ==
- 2008 Thailand League Division 1
- 2008 Thailand League Division 2
- Thailand 2008 RSSSF

Preceded by Thai Premier League; 2007	Thai Premier League; 2008; Provincial Electricity Authority	Succeeded by Thai Premier League; 2009
