= RBAC F.C. =

Thai football club

RBAC อาร์เเบค เอฟซี
- Full name: RBAC Football Club สโมสรฟุตบอลอาร์แบค
- Nickname(s): Mother's son (ลูกอาจารย์แม่)
- Founded: 1992; as Stock Exchange of Thailand Football Club
- Dissolved: 2016
- Ground: Rattana Bundit Stadium; Bangkok, Thailand
- Capacity: 3,000
- Owner: Rattana Bundit University

RBAC Football Club (Thai: สโมสรฟุตบอลอาร์แบค) is a Thai defunct semi-professional football club. The club last played in Regional League Division 2.

== History ==
=== Beginning ===
RBAC F.C. was born off the back of Bangkok Metropolitan Administration F.C., which went bankrupt in the 1997 Asian financial crisis. Bangkok Metropolitan Administration F.C. themselves took over from SET F.C. (Stock Exchange of Thailand) in similar circumstances in the early years of the Thailand Premier League.

SET F.C. reached the championship final playoff match in 1997, where they came up against Bangkok Bank in which they lost 2–0. Bangkok Bank therefore claimed in the inaugural Thailand Premier League title and SET F.C. claimed the runner-up spot.

=== First name change ===
Following a new set-up for the Thailand Premier League 1997 season, SET F.C., played under the name Bangkok Metropolitan Administration F.C. and came in a creditable 7th position. The following year, Bangkok Metropolitan Administration F.C. fell down the league table and finished in 11th position, which forced the club to enter the promotion/relegation end-of-season playoff match. Here they met Assumption Sriracha. This year also saw Bangkok Metropolitan Administration F.C. first piece of silverware as they won the 14th Yamaha Thailand Cup, beating Nakhon Si Thammarat in the final.

=== Second name change & Relegation to Division 1 ===
In the Thailand Premier League 1999 season they moved up the table and finished in 9th position, an improvement on the previous year. The Thailand Premier League 2000 season was BMA's last, as they finished in 4th position but fell on hard times and were replaced by Rattana Bundit the following year in the Thailand Premier League. It is believed that the club uses the same badge but plays under a different name from BMA and has closer links to the university in the area.

In their first appearance in the Premier League under their newly formed club, Rattana succumbed to relegation to the Thailand Division 1 League, after they could only total 18 points and only 10 goals in 22 matches in a very poor season.

In 2010 Thai Division 1 League, Rattana endured a disappointing season and finished 14th which resulted in them being relegated. However, due to an expansion of the league, they were given a reprieve when they defeated Rayong F.C. 4–2 in a two-legged playoff to retain their Thailand Division 1 League status for 2011.

=== Relegation to Division 2 ===
After 2011 Thai Division 1 League, RBAC was relegated to the 2012 Regional League Division 2. BEC Tero Sasana took over the club and ran the club as the reserve team. The club has changed its name after the parent team RBAC BEC Tero Sasana F.C. well known as 'R-BEC'. The proposal of the team is to produce young players for senior teams such as FC Barcelona B that produce players for FC Barcelona. In the first season of R-BEC, BEC Tero Sasana F.C. bought many national u-19 team players and sent on loan with this club. Andrew Ord, a coach of BEC Tero Sasana youth team, was sent to coach this team. After a poor season of 2011 Thai Premier League, Phayong Khunnaen stepped down from the senior team and BEC Tero Sasana promoted Andrew Ord to coaching senior team and sent Samrit Sechanah to the coaching reserve team.

After 2013 Thai Division 2 League Bangkok & field Region, RBAC cancel BEC Tero Sasana and had set new team to played 2014 Thai Division 2 League Bangkok & field Region

After 2014 Thai Division 2 League Bangkok & field Region, Ratchaburi took over the club and ran the club as the reserve team. The club has changed its name after the parent team Ratchaburi well known as 'RBM-R'. The proposal of the team is to produce young players for senior teams such as FC Barcelona B that produce players for FC Barcelona.

In 2016, RBAC Football Club decided to dissolve the team.

== Season by season record ==
Season	League									FA Cup	League Cup	Top goalscorer	
Season	Division	P	W	D	L	F	A	Pts	Pos	FA Cup	League Cup	Name	Goals
2007	DIV1	22	8	7	7	37	27	31	3rd				
2008	DIV1	30	10	10	10	46	48	40	9th				
2009	DIV1	30	11	8	11	58	56	41	8th	R3		Wutthipong Kerdkul	27
2010	DIV1	30	7	6	17	35	65	27	14th	R3		Chana Sonwiset	7
2011	DIV1	34	5	11	18	27	63	26	17th	R3			
2012	DIV2 Bangkok	34	19	8	7	72	34	65	3rd				
2013	DIV2 Bangkok	26	8	7	11	32	34	31	10th				
2014	DIV2 Bangkok	26	11	7	8	43	34	40	7th				
2015	DIV2 Bangkok	26	6	4	16	26	58	22	13th	R2	Last Qualification		

Champions	Runners-up	Promoted	Relegated

== Honours ==
- Thai Premier League
  - Runners-up: 1996–97 (under name of Stock Exchange of Thailand Football Club)
- Yamaha Thailand Cup
  - Winners: 1998 (under name of Bangkok Metropolitan Administration Football Club)
