= Witthaya Laohakul =

Thai footballer and manager

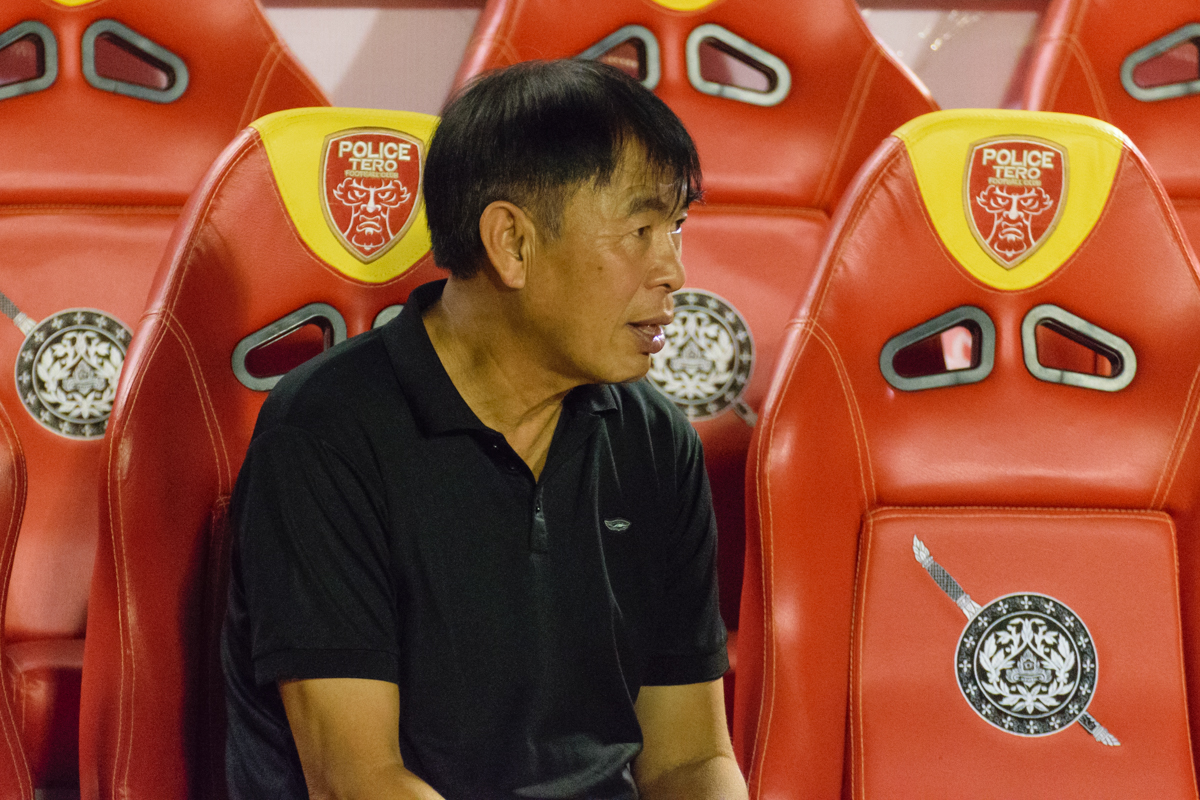
- Laohakul in 2018

Personal information
- Full name: Witthaya Laohakul
- Date of birth: 1 February 1954 (age 72)
- Place of birth: Lamphun, Thailand
- Height: 1.81 m (5 ft 11 in)
- Position: Defensive midfielder

Team information
- Current team: Chonburi (technical director)

Youth career
- 1969–1971: Rajpracha

Senior career*
Years	Team	Apps	(Gls)
1972–1976	Rajpracha	97	(28)
1977–1978	Yanmar Diesel	33	(14)
1979–1981	Hertha BSC	34	(1)
1982–1984	1. FC Saarbrücken	54	(7)
1984–1985	Rajpracha	24	(5)
1986–1987	Matsushita	32	(6)
Total		274	(57)

International career
1975–1985	Thailand	61	(18)

Managerial career
- 1988–1995: Gamba Osaka (assistant)
- 1995–1997: Bangkok Bank
- 1997–1998: Thailand
- 1998–1999: Bangkok Metropolitan
- 2000–2002: Thailand U16
- 2001: University of Nevada
- 2002–2003: Sembawang Rangers (U16/U18)
- 2004: Sembawang Rangers
- 2004–2006: Chonburi
- 2007–2010: Gainare Tottori
- 2011–2013: Chonburi
- 2024–2025: Chonburi (interim)
- 2025: Chonburi (interim)
- 2026–: Chonburi (interim)
- * Club domestic league appearances and goals

Witthaya Laohakul or Witthaya Hloagune previously nicknamed "Heng" (Lucky) (Thai: วิทยา เลาหกุล; born 1 February 1954) is a Thai football manager and former player, who is the technical director and caretaker coach of Chonburi. He was the technical director of Thai football during 2016 to 2018. He is the first Thai footballer who played for a European club at the German Bundesliga side Hertha BSC.

== Playing career ==
Laohakul was born in Lamphun Province, Thailand. His football career started with Rajpracha, a football club based in Bangkok. After that he joined Yanmar Diesel in 1977. This transfer made him the first Thai to play in Japan.

When he moved to Hertha BSC in 1979, he was the first Thai in the German league Bundesliga. Overall, he made only 33 league appearances in three years for the club. After moving to 1. FC Saarbrücken, it was better for him and he play at least 53 league appearances in two years, scoring seven goals. Greatest success in this period made him won the title in the Oberliga Südwest in the 1982–83 season and promoted to the 2. Bundesliga.

After his time at Saarbrücken, he returned to Thailand to play at Rajpracha for a short time. In 1986, he came back to play in Japan again as a player for Matsushita FC.

== Coaching career ==
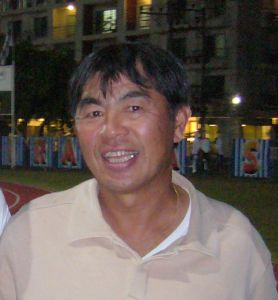
Witthaya in 2010

In 1988, Laohakul became assistant coach at Gamba Osaka, a founding member of the J League in 1992.

Returning to Thailand, he took over the Bangkok Bank F.C. and led the club to the first place in the 1996–97 Thailand Soccer League and qualification for the AFC Champions League. In 1997, he was rewarded coach of the year.

In 2004, he took over the Chonburi F.C. and next year he led Chonburi to win the Provincial League and promote to the Thai Premier League in the 2006 season.

Then he returned to Japan where he managed Gainare Tottori, a club from the third-highest division, with the task to lead the club to the J League.

In 2011 he joined Chonburi again as club manager but at the end of the 2013 Thai Premier League Witthaya resigned from his position to work as technical director.
