= 1999 Thai Premier League =

Thai Premier League
- Season: 1999
- Champions: Royal Thai Air Force
- Relegated: Royal Thai Army; Bangkok Bank of Commerce
- 2000–01 Asian Club Championship: Royal Thai Air Force FC
- 2000–01 Asian Cup Winners Cup: BEC Tero Sasana FC
- Top goalscorer: (Thailand) Sutee Suksomkit (Thai Farmers Bank) (13)
- Biggest home win: Royal Thai Air Force 10-0 Bangkok Bank of Commerce; Royal Thai Army 6-2 Bangkok Bank of Commerce; Thai Farmers Bank 4-0; Bangkok Bank of Commerce
- Biggest away win: Bangkok Metropolitan Administration 0-3; Port Authority of Thailand; Bangkok Bank of Commerce 0-3 Port Authority of Thailand; Krung Thai Bank 0-3; Port Authority of Thailand
- Highest scoring: Royal Thai Air Force 10-0 Bangkok Bank of Commerce (10 goals); Royal Thai Army 6-2 Bangkok Bank of Commerce (8 goals)

The 1999 Thai Premier League consisted of 12 teams. The bottom club would be relegated to the Thailand Division 1 League. The club that came 11th would play in a relegation / promotion match against the club that came second in the Thailand Division 1 League

Defending Champions Sinthana would enter the next edition of the Asian Club Championship.

The league was also known as the Caltex Premier League.

== Member clubs ==
- Bangkok Bank
- Bangkok Bank of Commerce (promoted from Division 1)
- BEC Tero Sasana
- Sinthana
- Krung Thai Bank
- Osotsapa M-150
- Port Authority of Thailand
- Bangkok Metropolitan Administration
- Royal Thai Air Force
- Royal Thai Army
- Thai Farmers Bank
- TOT
Locations of the Thai Premier League 1999 teams

== Final league table ==
Pos	Team	Pld	W	D	L	GF	GA	GD	Pts	Qualification or relegation
1	Royal Thai Air Force	22	11	6	5	43	27	+16	39	Champion and Qualification for the 2000–01 Asian Club Championship
2	Port Authority	22	12	3	7	31	16	+15	39	
3	BEC Tero Sasana	22	11	6	5	35	23	+12	39	
4	Osotsapa	22	10	9	3	32	21	+11	39	
5	TOT	22	11	5	6	26	20	+6	38	
6	Thai Farmers Bank	22	8	8	6	37	31	+6	32	
7	Sinthana (Note: Defending champion)	22	9	3	10	30	30	0	30	
8	Bangkok Bank	22	7	7	8	22	21	+1	28	
9	Bangkok Metropolitan	22	7	5	10	24	28	−4	26	
10	Krung Thai Bank	22	5	10	7	28	32	−4	25	
11	Royal Thai Army	22	7	4	11	25	30	−5	25	Qualification for the promotion/relegation playoff
12	Bangkok Bank of Commerce (Note: Promoted from last season)	22	0	2	20	11	65	−54	2	Relegation spot

Source: rsssf.com
Rules for classification: 1st points; 2nd head-to-head; 3rd goal difference; 4th goals scored

== Match fixing incident ==
In the last league fixture, Royal Thai Air Force defeated Bangkok Bank of Commerce 10-0 in a match that was widely believed to be fixed, since the result saw Royal Thai Air Force win the league title by a single goal differential.

An investigation led by the Football Association of Thailand saw the Bangkok Bank of Commerce club manager and an assistant be suspended for one year and six months reapectively, while the Bangkok Bank of Commerce club - who also had outstanding debts to the Thai FA - was expelled from the league and shut down.

There was no punishment to Royal Thai Air Force or its personnel, who were found to have no involvement in, or knowledge of, the match-fixing scheme.

== Promotion and relegation Playoff ==
The club that came 11th would play in a relegation / promotion match against the runner-up in the Thailand Division 1 League

Team 1	Result	Team 2
Royal Thai Army	0–1	† Royal Thai Navy

† Royal Thai Army relegated to the Thailand Division 1 League and Royal Thai Navy promoted to the Thai Premier League in next season.

== Queen's Cup ==
The 27th edition of the Queen's Cup was won by guest side Hanyang University of South Korea. This would be their 7th and final victory in the competition.

== Thailand FA Cup ==
Bangkok Bank won and retained the trophy for the second year running, by defeating Osotsapa 2–1. This was Bangkok Bank's 4th victory in the competition.

== Asian Representation ==
- After failing in the 1998–99 Asian Cup Winners Cup the previous year, Sinthana would progress to the third round, and group stage of the 1999–2000 Asian Club Championship. On their way to the group stage, Sinthana would gain victories over GD Lam Pak of Macau and Singapore Armed Forces FC. In the group stage they would once again come up against Kashima Antlers and be out played. Jubilo Iwata and Suwon Samsung Bluewings would also make up the group.
- Bangkok Bank reached the semi-finals of the 1999–2000 Asian Cup Winners Cup, where they were beaten by Shimizu S-Pulse of Japan on penalties in a game played in Chiang Mai. Bangkok Bank would compose themselves to win the 3rd/4th place match in beating Navbakhor Namangan FC of Uzbekistan.

== Annual awards ==
=== Coach of the Year ===
- (Thailand) Piyapong Piew-on - Royal Thai Air Force

== Top scorer ==
- (Thailand) Sutee Suksomkit - 13 Goals Thai Farmers Bank

== Champions ==
The league champion was Royal Thai Air Force. It was the team's second title.
