= 1996–97 Thailand Soccer League =

Thai Premier League
- Season: 1996/97
- Dates: 17 March 1996 – 16 March 1997
- Champions: Bangkok Bank
- Relegated: Thailand Tobacco Monopoly; Osotsapa; Bangkok Bank of Commerce; Rajvithi-Agfatech; Krung Thai Bank; Singha-Thamrongthai
- 1997–98 Asian Club Championship: Bangkok Bank FC
- 1997–98 Asian Cup Winners Cup: Royal Thai Air Force FC
- Top goalscorer: (Thailand) Ampon Ampansuwan (TOT) (21)
- Highest scoring: Royal Thai Air Force 4-3; Port Authority of Thailand; Rajvithi-Agfatech 4-3; Royal Thai Police (7 goals)

Between 1916 and 1995, the Kor Royal Cup was the top level of club football competition. In 1996 the Thai Premier League (official name: Johnnie Walker Thailand Soccer League) was established by the Football Association of Thailand, sponsored by whiskey manufacturing brand Johnnie Walker.

In its first season, 1996/97, the Thai Premier League consisted of 18 teams from the Kor Royal Cup. Top 4 teams in the final league table would be qualified for championship playoffs, and six teams at the bottom of the league table would be relegated to the Thailand Division 1 League which was to be created next season (1997).

The defending Champions of the Kor Royal Cup, Thai Farmers Bank FC, would enter the next edition of the Asian Club Championship.

== Member clubs locations ==
Locations of the Thailand Soccer League 1996-97 teams
- Bangkok Bank
- Bangkok Bank of Commerce
- Krung Thai Bank
- Osotsapa M-150
- Port Authority of Thailand
- UCOM Raj Pracha
- Rajvithi-Agfatech
- Royal Thai Air Force
- Royal Thai Army
- Royal Thai Navy
- Royal Thai Police
- Singha Tero Sasana
- Singha-Thamrongthai
- Sinthana
- Stock Exchange of Thailand
- Thai Farmers Bank
- Thailand Tobacco Monopoly
- TOT

== Final league table ==
Pos	Team	Pld	W	D	L	GF	GA	GD	Pts	Qualification or relegation
1	Thai Farmers Bank	34	18	10	6	56	25	+31	64	Qualification for the championship playoff
2	TOT	34	17	11	6	61	35	+26	62	Qualification for the championship playoff
3	Bangkok Bank	34	17	11	6	54	34	+20	62	Qualification for the championship playoff
4	Stock Exchange of Thailand	34	17	9	8	59	31	+28	60	Qualification for the championship playoff
5	UCOM Raj Pracha	34	16	12	6	62	36	+26	60	
6	Sinthana	34	17	6	11	45	45	0	57	
7	Royal Thai Air Force	34	14	12	8	48	35	+13	54	
8	Royal Thai Army	34	14	12	8	60	50	+10	54	
9	Royal Thai Navy	34	13	12	9	44	29	+15	51	
10	Royal Thai Police	34	13	11	10	53	39	+14	50	
11	Port Authority	34	9	14	11	44	39	+5	41	
12	Singha Tero Sasana	34	9	14	11	37	44	−7	41	
13	Tobacco Monopoly	34	7	14	13	37	44	−7	35	Relegation spot
14	Osotsapa	34	8	10	16	41	73	−32	34	Relegation spot
15	Bangkok Bank of Commerce	34	7	11	16	34	47	−13	32	Relegation spot
16	Rajvithi-Agfatech	34	8	8	18	43	71	−28	32	Relegation spot
17	Krung Thai Bank	34	5	9	20	32	54	−22	24	Relegation spot
18	Singha-Thamrongthai	34	1	6	27	26	101	−75	9	Relegation spot

Source: rsssf.com
Rules for classification: 1st points; 2nd head-to-head; 3rd goal difference; 4th goals scored

== Championship playoff ==
Top 4 of the league (Thai Farmers Bank, TOT, Bangkok Bank, Stock Exchange of Thailand) qualified for championship playoff.

=== Semifinals ===
February 23, 1997
14:00 (UTC+07:00)

Stock Exchange of Thailand	2–0	Thai Farmers Bank
Aung Kyaw 68', 74'

Thupatemi Stadium, Pathum Thani

February 23, 1997
16:00 (UTC+07:00)

TOT	2–3	Bangkok Bank
Pantong 55'; Piandit 67' (pen.)		Daorueang 36'; Sri-arun 45', 47'

Thupatemi Stadium, Pathum Thani
Attendance: 3

=== Final ===
March 16, 1997

Team 1	Result	Team 2
† Bangkok Bank	2-0	Stock Exchange of Thailand

March 16, 1997
16:00 (UTC+07:00)
Final

Bangkok Bank	2–0	Stock Exchange of Thailand
Trijaksang 18'; Daorueang 68'

National Stadium, Bangkok

† Champions : Bangkok Bank (Qualification for the Asian Club Championship).

== Season notes ==
- The league will be reduced in size to consist of only 12 teams for season 1997. The competing clubs will be: Bangkok Bank, Stock Exchange of Thailand, Thai Farmers Bank FC, TOT, Royal Thai Army, Royal Thai Air Force, Sinthana, UCOM-Rajpracha, Royal Thai Navy, Port Authority BEC Tero Sasana and Royal Thai Police.
- Another six teams, who failed to make it into the top 12 elite, Thailand Tobacco Monopoly, Osotsapa, Bangkok Bank of Commerce, Raj Vithi, Krung Thai Bank and Thamrongthai will join the top four teams from the old second division - Rayong, Samut Prakan, Royal Household Bureau and Bank for Agriculture and Co-Operatives - to make up a new second tier. It was also confirmed that there will be no play-offs for the championship this year and just one team will go either down to the Second Division and up to the first. However, the second bottom team in the top division will have to face. The second placed team in the second division to decide who takes up a place in the top 12 next year.

== Top Goalscorers ==
=== 21 Goals ===
- (Thailand) Amporn Ampansuwan - TOT

=== 18 Goals ===
- Pittaya Santawong - Stock Exchange of Thailand

=== 15 Goals ===
- (Thailand) Bunruam Srisang - Royal Thai Army
- (Thailand) Chaichan Kiewsen - Royal Thai Navy

=== 14 Goals ===
- (Thailand) Isarawit Chaopanich - Raj Vithi
- (Thailand) Natipong Sritong-In - Thai Farmers Bank
- (Thailand) Yuttana Polsak - UCOM Raj Pracha

=== 12 Goals ===
- (Thailand) Saman Deesanthiea - UCOM Raj Pracha
- (Thailand) Songserm Maperm - Royal Thai Air Force

=== 11 Goals ===
- (Thailand) Khanit Atcharayothin - Port Authority
- (Thailand) Phanuwat Yinphan - Thai Farmers Bank
- (Thailand) Suchin Phanprapas - UCOM Raj Pracha

=== 10 Goals ===
- (Cameroon) Belly Yeb - Tobacco Monopoly
- (Thailand) Chiaocharn Praekhuntod - Sinthana
- (Thailand) Kajorn Punnawet - Royal Thai Police
- (Thailand) Pisit Foopow - Royal Thai Army

== Asian Representation ==
- Thai Farmers Bank represented Thailand in the 1996–97 Asian Club Championship, where they would reach the second round, where they were beaten by eventual winners Pohang Steelers of South Korea.

== Annual awards ==
=== Coach of the Year ===
- (Thailand) Withaya Laohakul - Bangkok Bank

=== Player of the Year ===
- (Thailand) Amporn Amparnsuwan - TOT

=== Top scorer ===
- (Thailand) Amporn Amparnsuwan - 21 Goals TOT

== Champions ==
The league champion was Bangkok Bank. It was the team's first title.
