= René Desaeyere =

Belgian footballer and manager

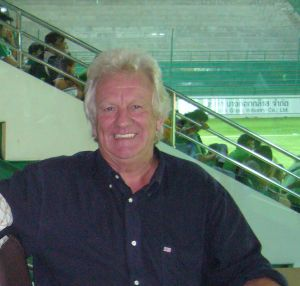

Personal information
- Full name: René Oscar Desaeyere
- Date of birth: 14 September 1947 (age 79)
- Place of birth: Antwerp, Belgium
- Position: Defender

Youth career
- Beerschot

Senior career*
Years	Team	Apps	(Gls)
1967–1970	Beerschot		
1970–1971	Daring Club Bruxelles		
1971–1978	FC Antwerp	191	(8)
1978–1983	RWDM		
1983–1984	Berchem Sport		
1984–1985	Dessel Sport		
1985–1987	Berchem Sport		

Managerial career
- 1984–1985: Dessel Sport
- 1985–1987: Berchem Sport
- 1987: Standard de Liège
- 1988–1989: Beveren
- 1989: Genk
- 1990: Germinal Ekeren
- 1990–1991: Kortrijk
- 1991–1992: Zwarte Leeuw Rijkevorsel
- 1992–1995: Beerschot
- 1995–1996: Beveren
- 1997–1998: Cheoan Ilhwa Chunma
- 1999–2000: Cerezo Osaka
- 2002: FC Denderleeuw
- 2003: FC Antwerp
- 2003–2004: FC Denderleeuw
- 2006–2009: Turnhout
- 2010–2011: Muangthong United
- 2011: Chiangmai
- 2011: Suphanburi
- 2013: BEC Tero Sasana
- 2013: Muangthong United
- 2015–2017: Yadanarbon
- 2018: Ratchaburi Mitr Phol
- 2022–2023: Hua Hin City
- 2023–: Maraleina
- * Club domestic league appearances and goals

René Desaeyere (born 14 September 1947) is a Belgian former football player and former manager of Muangthong United.

== Career ==
Desaeyere played for Beerschot, Daring Club Bruxelles, Royal Antwerp, R.W.D. Molenbeek, Berchem Sport and Dessel Sport.

== Coaching career ==
He managed Dessel Sport, Berchem Sport, Standard de Liège, Beveren, Genk, Germinal Ekeren, Kortrijk, Zwarte Leeuw Rijkevorsel, Beerschot, Cheonan Ilhwa Chunma (Currently Seongnam FC), Cerezo Osaka, FC Denderleeuw, Royal Antwerp, Turnhout and Muangthong United.

== Managerial statistics ==
Team	From	To	Record				
Team	From	To	G	W	D	L	Win %
Cerezo Osaka	1 February 1999	31 January 2000	30	19	0	11	63.33
Total			30	19	0	11	63.33
