= Christophe Larrouilh =

French football coach

Personal information
- Full name: Christophe Larrouilh
- Place of birth: France

Managerial career
- Years: Team
- 2008–2009: BEC Tero Sasana
- ‡ National team caps and goals as of June 28, 2008

Christophe Larrouilh is a French football coach.

== Career ==
Christophe was in charge of Thailand Premier League side BEC Tero Sasana from 2008 to 2009. He had been in charge of JMG Academy for 5 years, and was working for JMG academies in Madagascar and Ivory Coast. He was one of many foreigners evacuated from Ivory Coast in 2004 as political turmoil in the nation reached its climax.

Preceded by Regis Laguesse	BEC Tero Sasana head coach 2008-2009	Succeeded by Payong Khunnen
