= Piyapong Pue-on =

Thai footballer (born 1959)

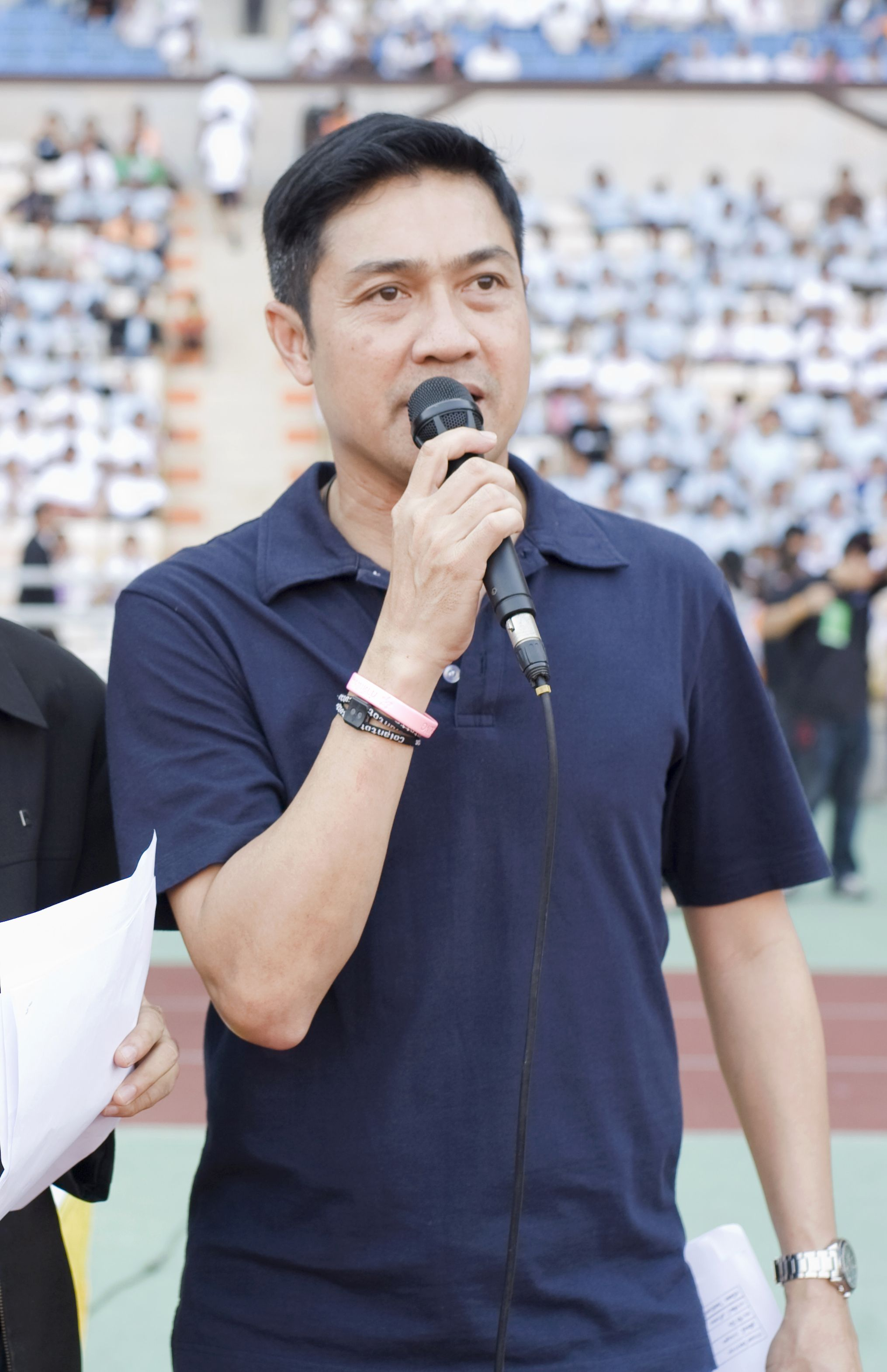
- Pue-on in 2010 at Rajamangala Stadium

Personal information
- Full name: Piyapong Pue-on
- Birth name: Padej Khankruea
- Date of birth: 14 November 1959 (age 66)
- Place of birth: Prachuap Khiri Khan, Thailand
- Height: 1.78 m (5 ft 10 in)
- Position: Striker

Team information
- Current team: Thailand (technical director)

Youth career
- 1976–1978: Air Technical Training School

Senior career*
| Years | Team | Apps | (Gls) |
| 1979–1984 | Royal Thai Air Force | 145 | (91) |
| 1984–1986 | Lucky-Goldstar Hwangso | 34 | (17) |
| 1986–1989 | Royal Thai Air Force | | |
| 1989–1990 | Pahang | 61 | (70) |
| 1990–1997 | Royal Thai Air Force | 248 | (164) |
| Total | | 488 | (342) |

International career
| 1981–1997 | Thailand | 100 | (70) |

Managerial career
- 1997–2008: Royal Thai Air Force
- 2009: Nakhon Pathom
- * Club domestic league appearances and goals

Piyapong Pue-on (Thai: ปิยะพงษ์ ผิวอ่อน; RTGS: Piyaphong Phio-on; born Padej Khankruea (Thai: เผด็จ ขันเครือ; RTGS: Phadet Khankhruea; 14 November 1959) is a Thai former football coach and player who played as a striker. He is the technical director of the Thailand national team.

Piyapong played for the Thailand national team and South Korean club Lucky-Goldstar Hwangso.

== Club career ==
=== Lucky-Goldstar Hwangso ===
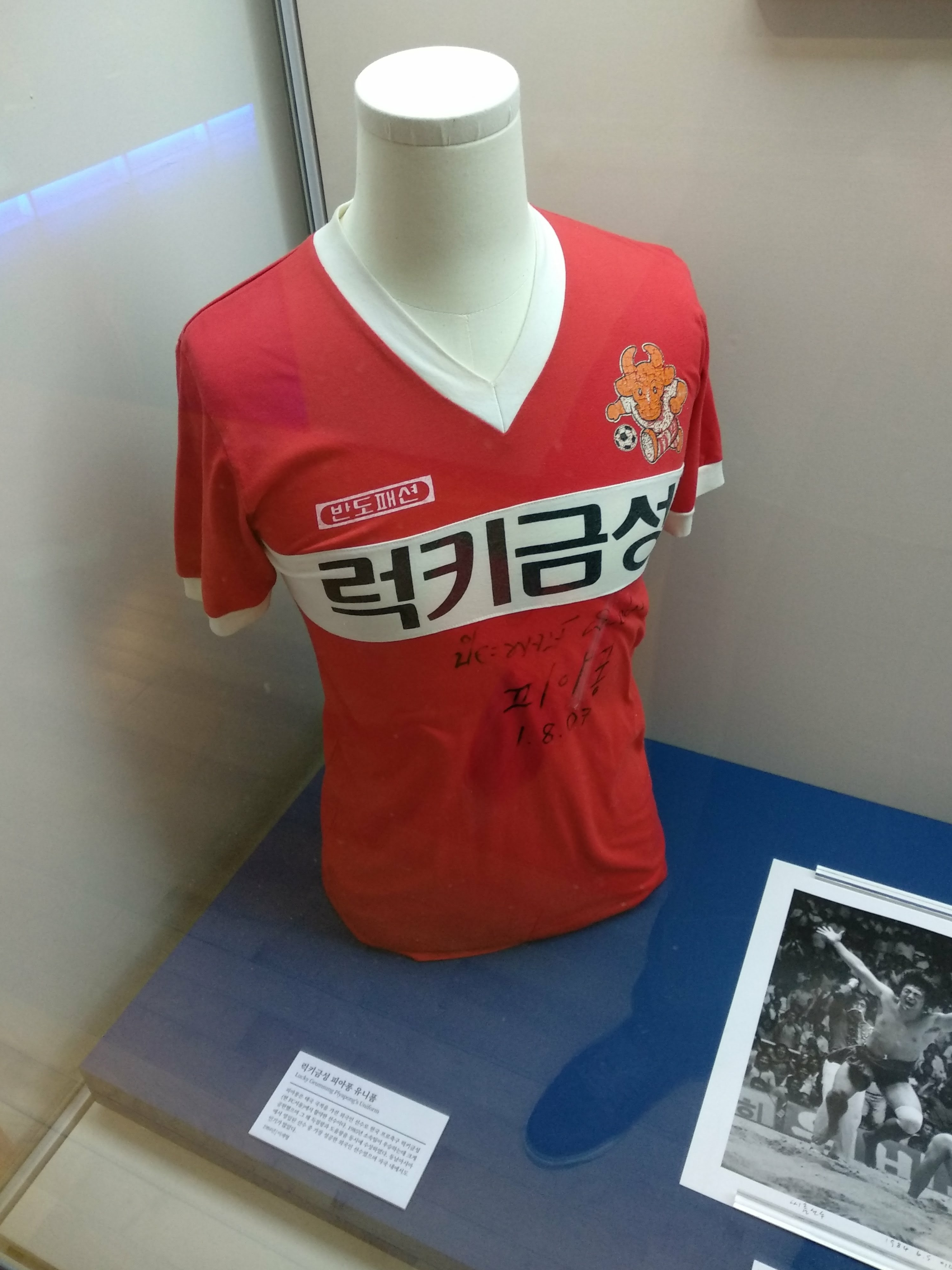
Piyapong Pue-on's signed Lucky-Goldstar Hwangso kit on display at the National Museum of Korean Contemporary History

In August 1984, Piyapong joined South Korean K League club Lucky-Goldstar Hwangso. On 8 September, he scored on his debut against POSCO Dolphins in the 1984 K League season.

He played one of the leading roles to crown Lucky-Goldstar as the 1985 K League champions, scoring 12 goals and providing six assists.

== International career ==
Piyapong played for the Thailand national team for 16 years, scoring 70 goals in 100 appearances in full international matches.

=== International goals ===
Results list Thailand's goal tally first.

| No. | Date | Venue | Opponent | Score | Result | Competition |
|---|---|---|---|---|---|---|
| 1. | June 20, 1981 | Seoul | Indonesia | 1 | 3–1 | 1981 President's Cup |
| 2. | November 11, 1981 | Bangkok | Pakistan | 1 | 1–0 | 1981 King's Cup |
| 3. | November 15, 1981 | Bangkok | Malaysia | 2 | 2–0 | 1981 King's Cup |
| 4. | November 15, 1981 | Bangkok | Malaysia | 2 | 2–0 | 1981 King's Cup |
| 5. | December 9, 1981 | Manila | Malaysia | 2 | 2–2 | 1981 Southeast Asian Games |
| 6. | December 9, 1981 | Manila | Malaysia | 2 | 2–2 | 1981 Southeast Asian Games |
| 7. | December 11, 1981 | Manila | Myanmar | 2 | 3–3 | 1981 Southeast Asian Games |
| 8. | December 11, 1981 | Manila | Myanmar | 2 | 3–3 | 1981 Southeast Asian Games |
| 9. | December 14, 1981 | Manila | Indonesia | 2 | 2–0 | 1981 Southeast Asian Games |
| 10. | December 14, 1981 | Manila | Indonesia | 2 | 2–0 | 1981 Southeast Asian Games |
| 11. | December 15, 1981 | Manila | Malaysia | 2 | 2–1 | 1981 Southeast Asian Games |
| 12. | December 15, 1981 | Manila | Malaysia | 2 | 2–1 | 1981 Southeast Asian Games |
| 13. | May 1, 1982 | Bangkok | Singapore | 1 | 1–1 | 1982 King's Cup |
| 14. | May 7, 1982 | Bangkok | Nepal | 1 | 3–1 | 1982 King's Cup |
| 15. | May 15, 1982 | Bangkok | Singapore | 2 | 2–2 | 1982 King's Cup |
| 16. | May 15, 1982 | Bangkok | Singapore | 2 | 2–2 | 1982 King's Cup |
| 17. | May 17, 1982 | Bangkok | South Korea | 1 | 0–0 (Note: Thailand won 4–3 after the penalty shootout.) | 1982 King's Cup |
| 18. | November 24, 1982 | New Delhi | Syria | 1 | 3–1 | 1982 Asian Games |
| 19. | April 10, 1983 | Kathmandu | Nepal | 2 | 2–0 | Affa Cup |
| 20. | April 10, 1983 | Kathmandu | Nepal | 2 | 2–0 | Affa Cup |
| 21. | May 29, 1983 | Singapore | Indonesia | 1 | 5–0 | 1983 Southeast Asian Games |
| 22. | May 31, 1983 | Singapore | Brunei | 2 | 2–1 | 1983 Southeast Asian Games |
| 23. | May 31, 1983 | Singapore | Brunei | 2 | 2–1 | 1983 Southeast Asian Games |
| 24. | June 4, 1983 | Singapore | Malaysia | 1 | 1–1 (Note: Thailand won 4–1 after the penalty shootout.) | 1983 Southeast Asian Games |
| 25. | June 6, 1983 | Singapore | Singapore | 1 | 2–1 | 1983 Southeast Asian Games |
| 26. | July 18, 1983 | Beijing | Hong Kong | 1 | 1–1 (Note: Thailand won 4–3 after the penalty shootout.) | 1983 Great Wall Cup |
| 27. | July 20, 1983 | Beijing | China | 1 | 1–2 | 1983 Great Wall Cup |
| 28. | November 1, 1983 | Bangkok | South Korea | 1 | 2–1 | 1984 Summer Olympics qualification |
| 29. | November 10, 1983 | Bangkok | China | 1 | 1–0 | 1984 Summer Olympics qualification |
| 30. | April 15, 1984 | Bangkok | Japan | 3 | 5–2 | 1984 Summer Olympics qualification |
| 31. | April 15, 1984 | Bangkok | Japan | 3 | 5–2 | 1984 Summer Olympics qualification |
| 32. | April 15, 1984 | Bangkok | Japan | 3 | 5–2 | 1984 Summer Olympics qualification |
| 33. | August 9, 1984 | Bangkok | Philippines | 2 | 3–0 | 1984 AFC Asian Cup qualification |
| 34. | August 9, 1984 | Bangkok | Philippines | 2 | 3–0 | 1984 AFC Asian Cup qualification |
| 35. | December 8, 1985 | Bangkok | Malaysia | 1 | 1–1 | 1985 Southeast Asian Games |
| 36. | December 12, 1985 | Bangkok | Philippines | 2 | 7–0 | 1985 Southeast Asian Games |
| 37. | December 12, 1985 | Bangkok | Philippines | 2 | 7–0 | 1985 Southeast Asian Games |
| 38. | December 15, 1985 | Bangkok | Indonesia | 2 | 7–0 | 1985 Southeast Asian Games |
| 39. | December 15, 1985 | Bangkok | Indonesia | 2 | 7–0 | 1985 Southeast Asian Games |
| 40. | September 23, 1986 | Daegu | United Arab Emirates | 1 | 1–2 | 1986 Asian Games |
| 41. | September 29, 1986 | Seoul | Pakistan | 3 | 6–0 | 1986 Asian Games |
| 42. | September 29, 1986 | Seoul | Pakistan | 3 | 6–0 | 1986 Asian Games |
| 43. | September 29, 1986 | Seoul | Pakistan | 3 | 6–0 | 1986 Asian Games |
| 44. | September 10, 1987 | Jakarta | Brunei | 2 | 3–1 | 1987 Southeast Asian Games |
| 45. | September 10, 1987 | Jakarta | Brunei | 2 | 3–1 | 1987 Southeast Asian Games |
| 46. | September 19, 1987 | Jakarta | Myanmar | 2 | 4–0 | 1987 Southeast Asian Games |
| 47. | September 19, 1987 | Jakarta | Myanmar | 2 | 4–0 | 1987 Southeast Asian Games |
| 48. | January 14, 1988 | Bangkok | Indonesia | 1 | 3–3 | 1988 King's Cup |
| 49. | January 30, 1989 | Bangkok | Indonesia | 2 | 3–0 | 1989 King's Cup |
| 50. | January 30, 1989 | Bangkok | Indonesia | 2 | 3–0 | 1989 King's Cup |
| 51. | February 19, 1989 | Bangkok | Bangladesh | 1 | 1–0 | 1990 FIFA World Cup qualification |
| 52. | August 22, 1989 | Kuala Lumpur | Myanmar | 2 | 3–0 | 1989 Southeast Asian Games |
| 53. | August 22, 1989 | Kuala Lumpur | Myanmar | 2 | 3–0 | 1989 Southeast Asian Games |
| 54. | August 24, 1989 | Kuala Lumpur | Singapore | 1 | 1–1 | 1989 Southeast Asian Games |
| 55. | February 10, 1993 | Bangkok | China | 1 | 1–0 | 1993 King's Cup |
| 56. | April 18, 1993 | Tokyo | Bangladesh | 3 | 4–1 | 1994 FIFA World Cup qualification |
| 57. | April 18, 1993 | Tokyo | Bangladesh | 3 | 4–1 | 1994 FIFA World Cup qualification |
| 58. | April 18, 1993 | Tokyo | Bangladesh | 3 | 4–1 | 1994 FIFA World Cup qualification |
| 59. | May 3, 1993 | Dubai | Sri Lanka | 3 | 3–0 | 1994 FIFA World Cup qualification |
| 60. | May 3, 1993 | Dubai | Sri Lanka | 3 | 3–0 | 1994 FIFA World Cup qualification |
| 61. | May 3, 1993 | Dubai | Sri Lanka | 3 | 3–0 | 1994 FIFA World Cup qualification |
| 62. | May 5, 1993 | Dubai | Bangladesh | 2 | 4–1 | 1994 FIFA World Cup qualification |
| 63. | May 5, 1993 | Dubai | Bangladesh | 2 | 4–1 | 1994 FIFA World Cup qualification |
| 64. | June 7, 1993 | Singapore | Myanmar | 1 | 2–0 | 1993 Southeast Asian Games |
| 65. | June 11, 1993 | Singapore | Brunei | 1 | 5–2 | 1993 Southeast Asian Games |
| 66. | June 13, 1993 | Singapore | Laos | 2 | 4–1 | 1993 Southeast Asian Games |
| 67. | June 13, 1993 | Singapore | Laos | 2 | 4–1 | 1993 Southeast Asian Games |
| 68. | June 20, 1993 | Singapore | Myanmar | 1 | 4–3 | 1993 Southeast Asian Games |
| 69. | March 2, 1997 | Bangkok | South Korea | 1 | 1–3 | 1998 FIFA World Cup qualification |
| 70. | October 12, 1997 | Jakarta | Cambodia | 1 | 4–0 | 1997 Southeast Asian Games |

== Coaching career ==
Piyapong coached the Royal Thai Air Force between 1997 and 2008.

== Personal life ==
Piyapong appeared in the 2004 Thai action film Born to Fight.

== Honours ==
=== Player ===
Lucky-Goldstar Hwangso

- K League (1): 1985

Pahang

- Malaysian League (1) : 1987

Thailand

- King's Cup (3): 1984, 1989, 1990
- SEA Games

Gold medal: 1981, 1983, 1985, 1993, 1997
Bronze medal: 1987

Individual

- K League Top Scorer Award (1): 1985
- K League Top Assists Award (1): 1985
- K League Best XI (1): 1985

=== Manager ===
Royal Thai Air Force

- Thai Premier League (2): 1997, 1999

=== Individual ===
- Asian Player of the Month: February 1997
- Asian Coach of the Month: January 1998

== See also ==
- List of men's footballers with 100 or more international caps
