= Chulalongkorn University Stadium =

Sports venue in Bangkok, Thailand

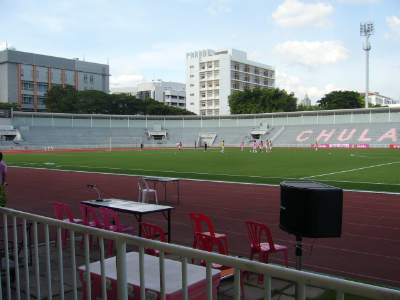
- Interactive map of Chulalongkorn University Stadium
- Full name: Chulalongkorn University Stadium
- Location: Pathum Wan, Bangkok, Thailand
- Coordinates: 13°44′15″N 100°31′31″E
- Owner: Chulalongkorn University
- Operator: Chulalongkorn University
- Capacity: 20,000
- Surface: artificial turf
- Public transit: MRT Sam Yan

Tenant
- Chamchuri United F.C.

The Chulalongkorn University Stadium, formerly Charusathian Stadium, is a multi-purpose stadium owned by Chulalongkorn University in Pathumwan, Bangkok, Thailand. It is on Chulalongkorn Soi 9 in Pathumwan in the centre of Bangkok and holds 20,000. It is used mostly for football matches and to host intra- and inter-university sports competitions the student body participates in. The stadium is the home of Chamchuri United F.C. of the Thai League 4, and previously served as the home stadium for the now defunct BBCU F.C. (formerly known as Chulalongkorn University F.C., Chula–Sinthana F.C. or Chula United).

In 2005, the stadium was renovated and became the first sports stadium in Thailand to be fitted with artificial turf.

Other stadiums in Bangkok include National Stadium, Rajamangala National Stadium, the Thai Army Sports Stadium and the Thai-Japanese Stadium.
