= Pichai Pituwong =

Thai football coach (born 1956)

Pichai Pituvong
Personal information
- Full name: Pichai Pituvong
- Date of birth: 15 October 1956 (age 70)
- Place of birth: Thailand

Managerial career
- Years: Team
- 2001–2002: BEC Tero Sasana FC
- 2009–2010: Chula United
- ‡ National team caps and goals as of September 19, 2008

Pichai Pituvong is a Thai football coach. He managed Thailand Premier League side BEC Tero Sasana FC in the 2001–02 Premier League season, taking over from Englishman Jason Withe, who had just led the club to the domestic double, the league and cup. Pichai himself led the club to the league title. He duly left the following season being replaced by Attaphol Puspakom.

In August 2009, he replaced the Brazilian coach, Carlos Ferreira at Chula United. After retiring from coaching works, he became a columnist.

== Teams managed ==
- BEC Tero Sasana: 2001–02
- Chula United: 2009

== Honours ==
- Thailand Premier League Winner: 2001–02
