= Krung Thai Bank F.C. =

Thai football club

Krung Thai Bank FC ทีมฟุตบอลธนาคารกรุงไทย
- Full name: Krung Thai Bank Football Club สโมสรฟุตบอลธนาคารกรุงไทย
- Nicknames: The Paradise bird's (นกวายุภักดิ์)
- Founded: 1977
- Dissolved: 2009 (became Bangkok Glass)
- Ground: Chulalongkorn University Stadium; Bangkok, Thailand
- Capacity: 20,000
- Owner: Krung Thai Bank
Home colours	Away colours

Krung Thai Bank Football Club (Thai: สโมสรฟุตบอลธนาคารกรุงไทย) was a Thai defunct professional football club based in Bangkok.

== History ==
Krung Thai Bank F.C. was a football club from central Bangkok established by Krung Thai Bank, PCL. in 1977. Krung Thai Bank officially withdrew from the Thailand football scene in January 2009 after being bought out by Bangkok Glass. Although selling out their Thailand Premier League status to BGFC Sport, Krung Thai Bank entered the 2009 Queen's Cup as their final competition.

== Stadium ==
The club used the multi-purpose Chulalongkorn University Stadium. This holds around 20,000 spectators, but during their AFC Champions League 2008 campaign, they attracted 2,000 fans for their opening clash against Japanese opposition Kashima Antlers. But during the rest of the campaign, they only attracted over 500 fans, not enough for the AFC rule. This is one of the reasons why the AFC reduced the number of Thai entrants to the Champions League, due to poor turnout and the lack of promoting their Champions League and domestic football games.

=== Stadium and locations ===
Coordinates	Location	Stadium	Capacity	Year
13°44′15″N 100°31′31″E	Bangkok	Chulalongkorn University Sports Stadium	20,000	2007–2008

== Results ==
=== Domestic league record 1996–2008 ===
Season	Pld	Won	Draw	Lost	GF	GA	GD	PTS	Final position	Notes
Thai Premier League 2008	30	13	7	10	47	36	+11	46	6th	AFC Champions League Group stage, Club folded
Thai Premier League 2007	30	15	9	6	40	24	+16	54	2nd	
Thai Premier League 2006	22	5	10	7	22	26	−4	25	9th	Queen's Cup Runner-up
Thai Premier League 2004/05	18	6	7	5	24	24	0	25	5th	AFC Champions League Group stage
Thai Premier League 2003/04	18	12	2	4	33	18	+15	38	Champions	Kor Royal Cup Winner, AFC Champions League Group stage
Thai Premier League 2002/03	18	10	6	2	29	15	+14	36	Champions	Kor Royal Cup Winner
Thai Premier League 2001/02	22	7	7	8	23	23	0	28	7th	
Thai Premier League 2000	22	6	3	13	21	40	−19	21	10th	
Thai Premier League 1999	22	5	10	7	28	32	−4	25	10th	
Thai Premier League 1998	22	6	4	12	24	37	−13	22	9th	
Thailand Division 1 League 1997	18	12	3	3	35	15	+20	39	Champions	Promotion to Thai Premier League
Thai Premier League 1996/97	34	5	9	20	32	54	−22	24	17th	Relegated to Thailand Division 1 League

=== International matches 2004–08 ===
Season	Team 1	Score	Team 2	Venue
2004	(Thailand) Krung Thai Bank	0–2	(China) Dalian Shide	Thai-Japanese Stadium, Thailand
2004	(Indonesia) PSM Makassar	2–3	(Thailand) Krung Thai Bank	Mattoangin Stadium, Indonesia
2004	(Vietnam) Hoang Anh Gia Lai	0–1	(Thailand) Krung Thai Bank	Pleiku Stadium, Vietnam
2004	(Thailand) Krung Thai Bank	2–2	(Vietnam) Hoang Anh Gia Lai	Suphachalasai Stadium, Thailand
2004	(China) Dalian Shide	3–1	(Thailand) Krung Thai Bank	Dalian People's Stadium, China PR
2004	(Thailand) Krung Thai Bank	1–2	(Indonesia) PSM Makassar	Thai-Japanese Stadium, Thailand
2005	(Thailand) Krung Thai Bank	2–1	(Vietnam) Pisico Bình Đinh	N/A
2005	(Thailand) Krung Thai Bank	0–2	(South Korea) Busan I'Park	N/A
2005	(Thailand) Krung Thai Bank	2–1	(Indonesia) Persebaya Surabaya	N/A
2005	(Thailand) Krung Thai Bank	0–1	(Vietnam) Pisico Bình Đinh	N/A
2005	(Thailand) Krung Thai Bank	0–4	(South Korea) Busan I'Park	N/A
2005	(Thailand) Krung Thai Bank	1–0	(Indonesia) Persebaya Surabaya	N/A
2008	(Thailand) Krung Thai Bank	1–9	(Japan) Kashima Antlers	Chulalongkorn University Stadium, Thailand
2008	(China) Beijing Guoan	4–2	(Thailand) Krung Thai Bank	Beijing Fengtai Stadium, China PR
2008	(Thailand) Krung Thai Bank	9–1	(Vietnam) Nam Định F.C.	Chulalongkorn University Stadium, Thailand
2008	(Vietnam) Nam Định F.C.	2–2	(Thailand) Krung Thai Bank	Mỹ Đình National Stadium, Vietnam
2008	(Japan) Kashima Antlers	8–1	(Thailand) Krung Thai Bank	Kashima Soccer Stadium, Japan
2008	(Thailand) Krung Thai Bank	5–3	(China) Beijing Guoan	Rajamangala Stadium, Thailand

== Coaches ==
Coaches by Years (2002/03 – 2008)

Name	Nat	Period	Honours
Narong Suwannachot	(Thailand)	2002/03	Thai Premier League 2002/03; Kor Royal Cup
Worrawoot Dangsamer	(Thailand)	2003/04	Thai Premier League 2003/04; Kor Royal Cup
Aris Gulsawadpakdee	(Thailand)	2004/05-2007	Thai Premier League 2007(Runner-up); Queen's Cup (Runner-up 2006)
Attaphol Buspakom	(Thailand)	2008	

== Honours ==
Domestic

- Thai Premier League:
  - Winner (2) 2002/03, 2003–04
- Thailand Division 1 League:
  - Winner (1) 1997
- Khǒr Royal Cup (Tier 2): (Thai: ถ้วย ข.):
  - Winner (1) 1993
- Thai League Cup:
  - Winner (1) 1992
- Kor Royal Cup: (Thai: ถ้วย ก.):
  - Winner (2) 1989, 1988
