= Bangkok Bank F.C. =

Thai football club

Bangkok Bank FC ทีมฟุตบอลธนาคารกรุงเทพ
- Full name: Bangkok Bank Football Club สโมสรฟุตบอลธนาคารกรุงเทพ
- Nicknames: The Royal Lotus (บัวหลวง)
- Founded: 1955
- Dissolved: 2008
- Ground: Bangkok Bank Ground; Bangkok, Thailand
- Capacity: 2,000
- Owner: Bangkok Bank
Home colours	Away colours

Bangkok Bank Football Club (Thai: สโมสรฟุตบอลธนาคารกรุงเทพ) was a Thai defunct semi-professional football club based in Bangkok from Bangkok Bank. Bangkok Bank FC was founded 1955 and played in the top Thai football division, the Thai Premier League. Their home stadium was Bangkok Bank Ground.

== History ==
The club dropped out of the Thai football system in 2008 after being relegated from the Thai Premier League. Bangkok Bank were certainly one of the biggest clubs in the Thai football scene, winning 11 Khor Royal Cup and 7 Kor Royal Cup titles before the Thai Premier League rose as we know it today. Bangkok Bank, were the first winners of the Premier League title in 1996/97 and represented Thailand in Asian club competitions.

== Stadium and locations by season ==
Coordinates	Location	Stadium	Capacity	Year
13°43′49″N 100°46′20″E	Bangkok	King Mongkut's Institute of Technology Ladkrabang Stadium	3,500	2007
13°40′49″N 100°38′52″E	Bangkok	Bangkok Bank Football Field (Udomsuk)	2,000	2007–2008

== Season by season record ==
Season	League									FA Cup	Queen's Cup	League Cup	Kor Royal Cup	AFC Competition		Top scorer	
Season	Division	P	W	D	L	F	A	Pts	Pos	FA Cup	Queen's Cup	League Cup	Kor Royal Cup	AFC Champions League	Asean	Name	Goals
1996–97	TPL	34	17	11	6	54	34	62	3rd	—N/a	—N/a	–	—N/a	–	–	—N/a	—N/a
1997	TPL	22	11	5	6	34	23	38	3rd	—N/a	—N/a	–	—N/a	R1	–	—N/a	—N/a
1998	TPL	22	6	13	3	33	27	31	5th	W	—N/a	–	—N/a	–	–	—N/a	—N/a
1999	TPL	22	7	7	8	22	21	28	8th	—N/a	—N/a	–	—N/a	–	–	—N/a	—N/a
2000	TPL	22	6	7	9	14	23	25	9th	—N/a	W	–	—N/a	–	–	—N/a	—N/a
2001–02	TPL	22	9	8	5	21	17	35	3rd	—N/a	–	–	—N/a	–	–	—N/a	—N/a
2002–03	TPL	18	6	10	2	31	26	28	4th	–	—N/a	–	—N/a	–	–	—N/a	—N/a
2003–04	TPL	18	7	5	6	28	21	26	6th	–	—N/a	–	—N/a	–	–	—N/a	—N/a
2004–05	TPL	18	5	5	8	25	28	20	8th	–	—N/a	–	—N/a	–	–	—N/a	—N/a
2006	TPL	22	10	4	8	26	28	34	5th	–	—N/a	–	—N/a	–	–	—N/a	—N/a
2007	TPL	30	10	14	6	28	23	44	7th	–	–	–	—N/a	–	–	—N/a	—N/a
2008	TPL	30	6	11	13	23	35	29	14th	–	–	–	—N/a	–	–	—N/a	—N/a

Champions	Runners-up	Third Place	Promoted	Relegated

- P = Played
- W = Games won
- D = Games drawn
- L = Games lost
- F = Goals for
- A = Goals against
- Pts = Points
- Pos = Final position
- N/A = No answer
- PLT = Thai League
- QR1 = First Qualifying Round
- QR2 = Second Qualifying Round
- QR3 = Third Qualifying Round
- QR4 = Fourth Qualifying Round
- RInt = Intermediate Round
- R1 = Round 1
- R2 = Round 2
- R3 = Round 3
- R4 = Round 4
- R5 = Round 5
- R6 = Round 6
- GR = Group Stage
- QF = Quarter-finals
- SF = Semi-finals
- RU = Runners-up
- S = Shared
- W = Winners

== Performance in AFC competitions ==
- Asian Club Championship: 10 appearances

1967: 4th Place
1969: Group Stage
1971: Group Stage
1986: Group Stage
1988: Group Stage
1991: Qualifying Stage
1992: Group Stage
1995: Second Round
1996: First Round
1998: First Round

- Asian Cup Winners Cup: 1 appearance
  1999/00: 3rd place

Team	GP	W	D	L	F	A	GD	PTS
Bangkok Bank	33	14	6	13	49	45	4	48

=== Results ===
Season	Team 1	Score	Team 2
1967	(Thailand) Bangkok Bank	0–1	(Hong Kong) South China
1967	(Thailand) Bangkok Bank	2–0	(Hong Kong) South China
1967	(Thailand) Bangkok Bank	0–1	(Malaysia) Selangor FA
1967	(Thailand) Bangkok Bank	0–0	(Malaysia) Selangor FA
1969	(Thailand) Bangkok Bank	1–1	(South Vietnam) Vietnam Police
1969	(Thailand) Bangkok Bank	1–1	(India) Mysore State
1969	(Thailand) Bangkok Bank	0–1	(South Korea) Yangzee FC
1969	(Thailand) Bangkok Bank	4–0	(Philippines) Manila Lions
1971	(Thailand) Bangkok Bank	2–0	(India) Punjab
1971	(Thailand) Bangkok Bank	0–2	(Iraq) Al-Shorta
1971	(Thailand) Bangkok Bank	1–4	(Israel) Maccabi Tel Aviv
1985	(Thailand) Bangkok Bank	2–0	(Singapore) Tiong Bahru CSC
1985	(Thailand) Bangkok Bank	1–1	(Indonesia) Krama Yudha Tiga Berlian
1985	(Thailand) Bangkok Bank	5–1	(Malaysia) Malacca FA
1985	(Thailand) Bangkok Bank	2–0	(Brunei) ADP FC

Season	Team 1	Score	Team 2
1985	(Thailand) Bangkok Bank	1–0	(Indonesia) Krama Yudha Tiga Berlian
1985	(Thailand) Bangkok Bank	1–0	(Indonesia) Krama Yudha Tiga Berlian
1985	(Thailand) Bangkok Bank	1–3	(South Korea) Daewoo Royals
1985	(Thailand) Bangkok Bank	0–3	(Syria) Al-Ittihad
1987–88	(Thailand) Bangkok Bank	0–0	(Sri Lanka) Air Force SC
1987–88	(Thailand) Bangkok Bank	7–0	(Maldives) Victory SC
1987–88	(Thailand) Bangkok Bank	0–4	(Saudi Arabia) Al-Hilal
1987–88	(Thailand) Bangkok Bank	1–6	(Iraq) Al Rasheed
1990–91	(Thailand) Bangkok Bank	1–2	(Indonesia) Pelita Jaya Jakarta
1990–91	(Thailand) Bangkok Bank	2–1	(Singapore) Geylang International
1995–96	(Thailand) Bangkok Bank	0–2	(Indonesia) Persib Bandung
1995–96	(Thailand) Bangkok Bank	1–0	(Indonesia) Persib Bandung
1997–98	(Thailand) Bangkok Bank	2–4	(China) Dalian Wanda
1997–98	(Thailand) Bangkok Bank	0–0	(China) Dalian Wanda

== Coaches ==
Coaches by Years (1990–2008)

Name	Nat	Period	Honours
Chatchai Paholpat	(Thailand)	1990–92	
Withaya Laohakul	(Thailand)	1995–97	Thai Premier League
Chalermwoot Sa-Ngapol	(Thailand)	1999–00	Thai FA Cup, Queen's Cup, Asian Cup Winner's Cup 3rd Place
Wisoot Wichaya	(Thailand)	2001–02	
Chalermwoot Sa-Ngapol	(Thailand)	2002–03, 2004–05	
Anant Amornkiat	(Thailand)	2006–07	
Apiruck Sriaroon	(Thailand)	2007	
Wisoot Wichaya	(Thailand)	2008	

== Honours ==
=== Domestic ===
==== League ====
- Thai Premier League
  - Winner (1): 1996–97
- Kor Royal Cup
  - Winner (8): 1964, 1966, 1967(Shared), 1981, 1984, 1986, 1989, 1994
- Khǒr Royal Cup (Tier 2)
  - Winner (6): 1963, 1966, 1968, 1969, 1971, 1978

==== Cup ====
- Queen's Cup
  - Winner (3): 1970(Shared), 1983, 2000
- Thai FA Cup
  - Winner (3): 1980, 1981(Shared), 1998
- League Cup
  - Winner (1): 1988

=== International ===
- ASEAN Champions' Cup
  - Winner (1): 1985

=== Invitational ===
- Aga Khan Gold Cup (Note: The competition is widely regarded as the predecessor of AFC Champions League (held for the first time in 1967), since it was the first organized international competition that involved club teams around Asia, organized by the football authorities of East Pakistan, in collaboration with Asian Football Confederation (AFC).)
  - Winner (1): 1981–82 (shared)
