= Queen's Cup (football) =

- Organiser(s): Football Association of Thailand
- Founded: 1970
- Abolished: 2010
- Region: Thailand
- Teams: 32
- Last champions: (Thailand) Krung Thai Bank-BG (1st title)
- Most championships: (South Korea) Hanyang University (7 titles)

The Queen's Cup was an annual football cup competition in Thailand, run by the Football Association of Thailand. The competition was named after Queen Sirikit. It was first contested in 1970, with Bangkok Bank and Royal Thai Air Force joint winners. The last competition was held in 2010.

== Championship history ==
Season	Winner	Result	Runner up
1970	(Thailand) Bangkok Bank (Thailand) Royal Thai Air Force		Shared
1971	(Indonesia) Bulog Putera		
1972	(Thailand) Raj Pracha		
1973	(Thailand) Raj Vithi		
1974	(Thailand) Royal Thai Air Force		
1975	Cancelled		
1976	(Japan) Yanmar Diesel		
1977	(South Korea) Hanyang University; Port Authority of Thailand		Shared
1978	Port Authority of Thailand		
1979	Port Authority of Thailand (China) August 1		Shared
1980	Port Authority of Thailand	3-2	(China) August 1
1981	(Thailand) Raj Pracha	1-0	(China) Beijing FC
1982	(Thailand) Royal Thai Air Force	2-0	(South Korea) Hanyang University
1983	(Thailand) Bangkok Bank		
1984	(South Korea) Hanyang University	1-1 (pens 4–3)	Port Authority of Thailand
1985	Cancelled		
1986	(China) Shanghai FC	0-0 (pens 4–1)	(Denmark) FC Copenhagen
1987	Port Authority of Thailand	2-0	(Thailand) Krung Thai Bank
1988	(South Korea) Hanyang University	1-0	(Thailand) Raj Pracha
1989	(South Korea) Hanyang University	3-1	(Thailand) Royal Thai Air Force
1990	(South Korea) Hanyang University	1-0	(Thailand) Royal Thai Police
1991	(South Korea) Hanyang University	0-0 (pens 5–4)	(Thailand) Thai Farmers Bank
1992	(Japan) Gamba Osaka	4-3	(Thailand) Royal Thai Air Force
1993	Port Authority of Thailand	2-0	(Thailand) Royal Thai Air Force
1994	(Thailand) Thai Farmers Bank	4-2	(Thailand) Raj Vithi
1995	(Thailand) Thai Farmers Bank	2-1	(Thailand) Raj Pracha
1996	(Thailand) Thai Farmers Bank	1-1 (pens 4–3)	(Thailand) Sinthana
1997	(Thailand) Thai Farmers Bank	1-0	(Thailand) Royal Thai Navy
1998	Cancelled		
1999	(South Korea) Hanyang University	3-1	(Thailand) Raj Pracha
2000	(Thailand) Bangkok Bank	2-2 (pens 5–3)	(Thailand) Sinthana
2001	Cancelled		
2002	(Thailand) Osotsapa		
2003	(Thailand) Osotsapa	1-0	(Thailand) TOT
2004	(Thailand) Osotsapa		
2005	Cancelled		
2006	(Thailand) Royal Thai Navy	1-0	(Thailand) Krung Thai Bank
2007	Cancelled		
2008	Cancelled		
2009	(South Korea) Ansan Hallelujah	1-0	(Thailand) BEC Tero Sasana
2010	(Thailand) Krung Thai Bank-BG	4-1	(Thailand) Police United

== See also ==
- Thai football records and statistics
