= Thai Farmers Bank F.C. =

Defunct association football club in Thailand

Thai Farmers Bank FC ทีมฟุตบอลธนาคารกสิกรไทย
- Full name: Thai Farmers Bank; Football Club สโมสรฟุตบอลธนาคารกสิกรไทย
- Nicknames: The Ear of Rice (แบงค์รวงข้าว); Champions of Thailand
- Founded: 1987
- Dissolved: 2000
- Ground: Kasikorn Bank Stadium; Bangkok, Thailand
- Capacity: 5,000
- Owner: Kasikornbank
Home colours	Away colours

Thai Farmers Bank Football Club (Thai: สโมสรฟุตบอลธนาคารกสิกรไทย) was a Thai football club based in Bangkok and was owned by Thai Farmers Bank. They won two AFC Champions League titles in 1994 and 1995.

The club shut down in 2000 as a result of the fallout from the 1997 Asian financial crisis on its parent.

== Performance in AFC competitions ==
- Asian Club Championship: 5 appearances

1993: Qualifying – 3rd round
1994: Champion
1995: Champion
1996: 3rd place
1997: Second Round

=== Results ===
Season	Opponents	Score	Round
1992–93	(Indonesia) Arseto Solo	2–0	Third qualifying round
1992–93	(Indonesia) Arseto Solo	0–3	Third qualifying round
1993–94; Champions	(Indonesia) Arema Malang	2–2	First round
1993–94; Champions	(Indonesia) Arema Malang	4–1	First round
1993–94; Champions	(China) Liaoning FC	1–1	Quarter-finals
1993–94; Champions	(Bahrain) Muharraq Club	2–2	Quarter-finals
1993–94; Champions	(Japan) Verdy Kawasaki	1–1	Semi-finals
1993–94; Champions	Oman Club	2–1	Final
1994–95; Champions	(India) Mohun Bagan	4–0	Second round
1994–95; Champions	(China) Liaoning FC	2–2	Quarter-finals
1994–95; Champions	(Japan) Verdy Kawasaki	0–0	Quarter-finals
1994–95; Champions	(South Korea) Ilhwa Chunma	0–1	Quarter-finals
1994–95; Champions	(Uzbekistan) FK Neftchy Farg'ona	2–2	Semi-finals
1994–95; Champions	(Qatar) Al-Arabi	1–0	Final
1995	(Maldives) Club Valencia	6–0	Second round
1995	(Maldives) Club Valencia	1–0	Second round
1995	(South Korea) Ilhwa Chunma	1–1	Quarter-finals
1995	(Japan) Verdy Kawasaki	0–0	Quarter-finals
1995	(Indonesia) Persib Bandung	2–1	Quarter-finals
1995	(Saudi Arabia) Al Nassr	0–1	Semi-finals
1995	(Iran) Saipa	2–1	Third place play-off
1996–97	(South Korea) Pohang Steelers	1–3	Second round
1996–97	(South Korea) Pohang Steelers	0–2	Second round

== Honours ==
International
Afro-Asian Club Championship	1	1994
Continental
Asian Club Championship	2	1993–1994, 1994–1995
Domestic
Thai FA Cup	1	1999
Kor Royal Cup	5	1991, 1992, 1993, 1995, 1999
Queen's Cup	4	1994, 1995, 1996, 1997

Achievements
Preceded by PAS Tehran (Iran)	Champions of Asia; 1993–94	Succeeded by Holders
Preceded by Holders	Champions of Asia; 1994–95	Succeeded by Ilhwa Chunma (South Korea)
