= Sasom Pobprasert =

Thai footballer (born 1967)

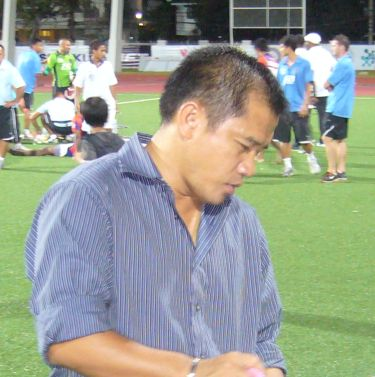

Personal information
- Full name: Sasom Pobprasert
- Date of birth: 10 October 1967 (age 59)
- Place of birth: Nakhon Sawan, Thailand
- Height: 1.61 m (5 ft 3 1/2 in)
- Position: Defensive midfielder

Team information
- Current team: PT Prachuap (head coach)

Senior career*
Years	Team	Apps	(Gls)
1992–1997	Thai Farmers Bank	91	(22)
1998–2002	BEC Tero Sasana	45	(13)
Total		136	(35)

International career
1984	Thailand U17	1	(0)
1997	Thailand	8	(1)

Managerial career
- 2001: Thailand U14
- 2001–2003: Norgjorg Pittayanusorn
- 2003–2004: Thailand U16
- 2004–2005: BEC Tero Sasana
- 2009–2011: Thai Port
- 2011: Buriram
- 2011: Thailand U16
- 2012–2014: Bangkok United
- 2014: Thailand U19
- 2015–2018: Air Force Central
- 2019–2023: Chonburi
- 2024–: PT Prachuap
- * Club domestic league appearances and goals

Sasom Pobprasert (Thai: สะสม พบประเสริฐ; born 10 October 1967) is a Thai professional football manager and former football player. He is currently the head coach of the Thai League 1 club, PT Prachuap.

== International career ==
He is a former footballer in Thailand who played as midfielder for Thailand national team, including an appearance in a 1998 FIFA World Cup qualifying match. He scored one goal for the national team.

== International goals ==
List of international goals scored by Sasom Pobprasert
Goal	Date	Venue	Opponent	Score	Result	Competition
1.	16 February 1997	Bangkok, Thailand	Sweden	1–3	Lost	1997 King's Cup

== Managerial career ==
In 2009, he became the manager of Thai Premier League side Thai Port He has made an instant impact at PAT Stadium and has targeted a top five finish for the 2009 season. He previously managed BEC Tero Sasana from 2004 until early 2005.

On 31 January 2024, Sasom was appointed head coach of PT Prachuap, replacing compatriot Dusit Chalermsan.

== Managerial statistics ==
As of match played 21 November 2026

Managerial record by team and tenure
Team	Nat.	From	To	Record					Ref.
Team	Nat.	From	To	G	W	D	L	Win %	Ref.
Port	(Thailand)	1 January 2009	30 June 2011	2	0	1	1	0.00	
Thailand U16	(Thailand)	1 July 2011	31 July 2011	6	4	2	0	66.67	
Bangkok United	(Thailand)	1 January 2012	30 November 2013	32	8	7	17	25.00	
Thailand U19	(Thailand)	1 January 2014	31 December 2014	2	1	0	1	50.00	
Air Force Central	(Thailand)	1 January 2015	3 April 2018	11	1	1	9	9.09	
Chonburi	(Thailand)	3 June 2019	10 April 2023	117	48	22	47	41.03	
PT Prachuap	(Thailand)	31 January 2024	Present	97	43	28	26	44.33	
Career Total				267	105	61	101	39.33	

== Other works ==
He vary from the player and manager to the football pundit with the mantle of commentator who analysis for the football matches alongside TrueVisions and PPTV channel.

== Honours ==
=== Player ===
Thai Farmers Bank

- Asian Club Championship: 1993-94, 1994-95
- Kor Royal Cup: 1992, 1993, 1995
- Queen's Cup: 1994, 1995, 1996, 1997

BEC Tero Sasana

- Thai Premier League: 2000, 2001-02
- Kor Royal Cup: 2000

=== Manager ===
Thailand U16

- AFF U-16 Youth Championship: 2011

Thai Port

- Thai FA Cup: 2009
- Thai League Cup: 2010

Chonburi

- Thai FA Cup runner-up: 2020–21

PT Prachuap

- Thai FA Cup runner-up: 2025–26

Individual

- Thai League 1 Coach of the Year: 2025–26
- Thai League 1 Coach of the Month: September 2021, September 2022, April 2024
