= Pattara Piyapatrakitti =

Thai footballer (born 1980)

Personal information
- Date of birth: 11 June 1980 (age 46)
- Place of birth: Sa Kaeo, Thailand
- Height: 1.80 m (5 ft 11 in)
- Position: Goalkeeper

Youth career
- 1992–1997: Suphanburi Sports School

Senior career*
Years	Team	Apps	(Gls)
1998–2005	Krung Thai Bank	98	(0)
2006	Tiền Giang	7	(0)
2007	RBAC	11	(0)
2008	Buriram PEA	6	(0)
2009–2010	Thai Port	23	(0)
2011–2014	Police United	42	(0)
2015–2016	Muangthong United	0	(0)
2015–2016	→ Pattaya United (loan)	34	(0)
2016	→ Super Power (loan)	10	(0)
2017	Chiangrai United	22	(0)
2017–2019	PTT Rayong	29	(0)
Total		282	(0)

International career
1998–1999	Thailand U19	11	(0)
2001–2003	Thailand U23	4	(0)
2000–2004	Thailand	3	(0)
Medal record
Thailand under-23
Sea Games
Gold medal – first place	Sea Games 2001	Football
Gold medal – first place	Sea Games 2003	Football
- * Club domestic league appearances and goals as of 24 October 2017

Pattara Piyapatrakitti (Thai: ภัทร ปิยภัทร์กิติ, born 11 June 1980), formerly known as Pattarakorn Thanganuruck or Punuwat Tangunurat, also simply known as James (Thai: เจมส์), is a Thai retired professional footballer who plays as a goalkeeper.

== Honours ==
Krung Thai Bank

- Thai Premier League: 2002–03, 2003–04

PEA

- Thai Premier League: 2008

Thai Port

- Thai FA Cup: 2009
- Thai League Cup: 2010

Chiangrai United

- Thai FA Cup: 2017

Thailand U23

- Sea Games Gold Medal: 2001, 2003
