= Rangsan Viwatchaichok =

Thai footballer

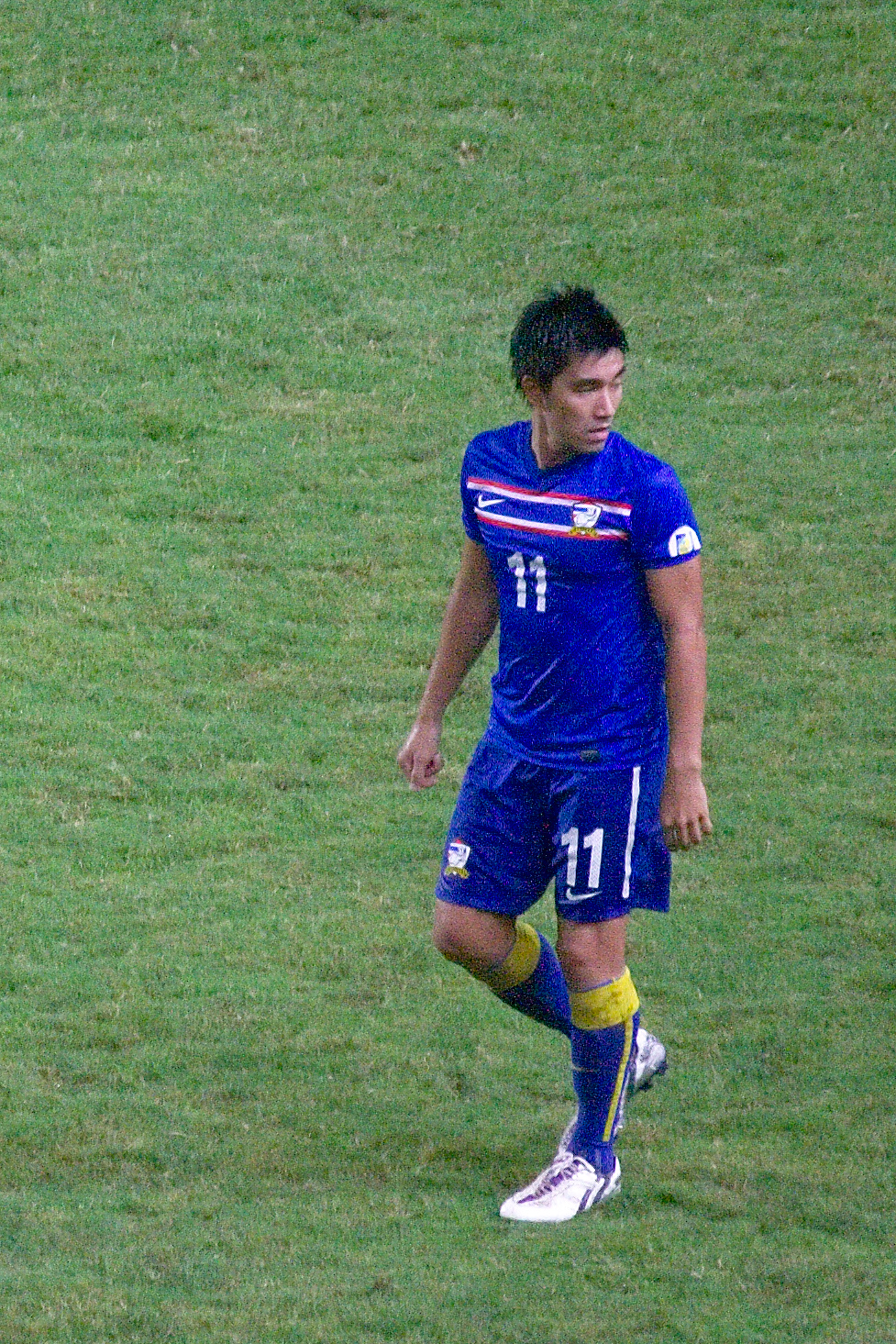
- Rangsan during the 2014 FIFA World Cup qualifying match against Oman at the Rajamangala Stadium

Personal information
- Full name: Rangsan Viwatchaichok
- Date of birth: 22 January 1979 (age 47)
- Place of birth: Bangkok, Thailand
- Height: 1.78 m (5 ft 10 in)
- Positions: Defensive midfielder; left back

Youth career
- 1995–1997: Stock Exchange of Thailand

Senior career*
Years	Team	Apps	(Gls)
1999–2001	BEC Tero Sasana	45	(4)
2002	Krung Thai Bank	8	(1)
2003	Tobacco Monopoly	12	(1)
2004	Krung Thai Bank	16	(0)
2004–2006	Bangkok Bank	58	(2)
2006–2007	Geylang United	63	(6)
2008–2011	Buriram United	103	(18)
2012–2016	BEC Tero Sasana	112	(16)
2016–2017	Suphanburi	23	(1)
2022–2023	Police Tero	0	(0)
Total		440	(49)

International career
2004–2012	Thailand	29	(1)

Managerial career
- 2015: BEC Tero Sasana (interim)
- 2015: BEC Tero Sasana (interim)
- 2018: Police Tero (interim)
- 2018: Police Tero
- 2018–2023: Police Tero
- 2023–2024: Port
- 2024–2025: Port
- 2025: Muangthong United
- 2025–2026: Chonburi
- * Club domestic league appearances and goals

Rangsan Viwatchaichok (Thai: รังสรรค์ วิวัฒน์ชัยโชค; RTGS: Rangsan Wiwatchaichok, born 22 January 1979) is a Thai professional football manager and former professional footballer.

Rangsan currently holds the record for the most all-time appearances in Thai League 1, with 440 appearances. He is known for his set pieces freekick back in his playing career.

== International career ==
Rangsan has played 29 games for the senior Thailand national team since 2004, and he has scored one goal in the process.

== Managerial career ==
=== BEC Tero Sasana ===
On 11 July 2013, BEC Tero Sasana sacked René Desaeyere and promoted Choketawee Promrut to be the club interim manager. Rangsan, who was the club captain, was also promoted to be the assistant coach.

On 9 August 2015, Rangsan was promoted to be the interim manager of BEC Tero Sasana after the removal of Kenny Shiels.

He had coached the club for three games before the appointment of Manuel Cajuda on 27 August.

On 1 December 2015, he was promoted to be the interim manager again after the resignation of Manuel Cajuda. Rangsan managed the club in the last three games of 2015 season with the record of 2 wins and 1 loss. The club set to relegate to Division 1 according to the final standing but still remained in top league after the withdraw of Saraburi from the competition.

=== Suphanburi ===
On 17 April 2017, Rangsan was appointed as assistant manager of Suphanburi under manager Adebayo Gbadebo.

=== Police Tero ===
On 23 April 2018, FOX Sports Asia reported in an article that Rangsan was appointed head coach of Police Tero following the departure of Englishman Scott Cooper. On 29 June, he was demoted to assistant under Totchawan Sripan before getting promoted to manager again on 14 September the same year.

=== Port ===
After 5 years at Police Tero, Rangsan was appointed to replace Surapong Kongthep as the manager of Thai League 1 club Port on 8 November 2023.

=== Muangthong United ===
On 28 May 2025, Rangsan was appointed manager of Thai League 1 club Muangthong United replacing Gino Lettieri.

=== Chonburi ===
On 13 November 2025, Rangsan was appointed manager of Thai League 1 club Chonburi replacing Teerasak Po-on.

== International goals ==
List of international goals scored by Rangsan Viwatchaichok
No.	Date	Venue	Opponent	Score	Result	Competition
1	18 July 2009	Nonthaburi, Thailand	Pakistan	2–0	4–0	Friendly

== Managerial statistics ==
As of match played 11 October 2026

Managerial record by team and tenure
Team	From	To	Record								Ref
Team	From	To	G	W	D	L	GF	GA	GD	Win %	Ref
Police Tero	1 April 2018	29 June 2018	15	8	3	4	34	26	+8	53.33	
Police Tero	14 September 2018	7 November 2023	161	65	41	55	227	224	+3	40.37	
Port	7 November 2023	2 November 2024	39	21	12	6	82	42	+40	53.85	
Port	11 November 2024	15 January 2025	8	2	2	4	11	15	−4	25.00	
Muangthong United	28 May 2025	25 October 2025	9	2	4	3	9	11	−2	22.22	
Chonburi	13 November 2025	13 October 2026	27	11	4	12	41	38	+3	40.74	
Total			259	109	66	84	404	356	+48	42.08	—

== Honours ==
=== Player ===
BEC Tero Sasana

- Thai Premier League: 2000
- Thai League Cup: 2014

Krung Thai Bank

- Thai Premier League: 2002–03, 2003–04

Buriram United

- Thai Premier League: 2008, 2011
- Thai FA Cup: 2011
- Thai League Cup: 2011

=== Manager ===
Police Tero

- Thai League 2 runner-up: 2019

Individual

- Thai League 1 Coach of the Month: October 2022, December 2023
