= Thanat Jantaya =

Thai footballer (born 1989)

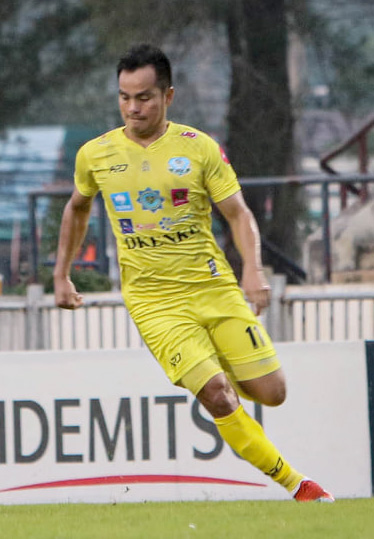

Personal information
- Full name: Thanat Jantaya
- Date of birth: 26 March 1989 (age 37)
- Place of birth: Ubon Ratchathani, Thailand
- Height: 1.70 m (5 ft 7 in)
- Position: Attacking midfielder

Team information
- Current team: Chainat Hornbill
- Number: 13

Youth career
- 2004–2006: Chonburi

Senior career*
Years	Team	Apps	(Gls)
2007–2011	Air Force United		
2012	Sisaket		
2013	Bangkok United		
2013	→ Krabi (loan)		
2014	Air Force United		
2014–2016	Ayutthaya		
2016–2018	Chainat	33	(2)
2019	Air Force Central		
2020–	Chainat Hornbill		
- * Club domestic league appearances and goals

Thanat Jantaya (Thai: ธานัท จันทะยา, born March 26, 1989), is a Thai professional footballer who plays as an attacking midfielder for Thai League 1 club Chainat Hornbill.
