= Pichitphong Choeichiu =

Thai professional footballer

Phichitphong Choeichiu
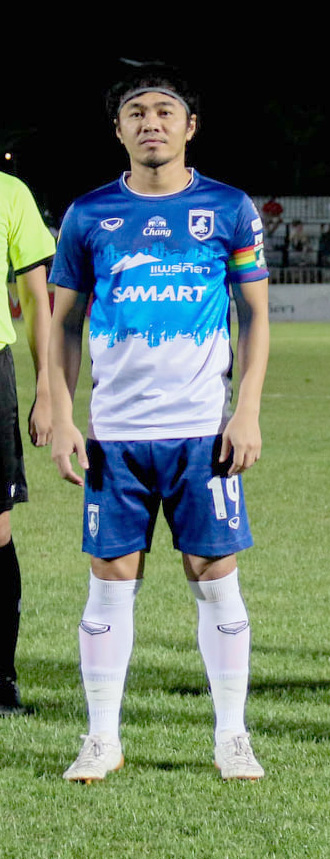
- Choeichiu in 2021

Personal information
- Full name: Phichitphong Choeichiu
- Date of birth: 28 August 1982 (age 44)
- Place of birth: Yasothon, Thailand
- Height: 1.70 m (5 ft 7 in)
- Position: Midfielder

Youth career
- 1998–2001: Krung Thai Bank

Senior career*
Years	Team	Apps	(Gls)
2002–2008	Krung Thai Bank	126	(43)
2009–2013	Muangthong United	125	(10)
2014–2016	Chiangrai United	73	(9)
2017	BEC Tero Sasana	24	(1)
2018–2019	Chiangmai	26	(4)
2020–2021	Phrae United	42	(2)
2022	Samut Prakan City	1	(0)
Total		417	(69)

International career^{‡}
1998–1999	Thailand U16	14	(3)
2001–2005	Thailand U23	5	(1)
2002–2013	Thailand	72	(3)

Managerial career
- 2021–2022: Phrae United (caretaker)
- 2022: Samut Prakan City (assistant)
- 2022–2023: Muang Loei United
- 2023–2024: Rongseemaechaithanachotiwat Phayao
- 2025–: BG Pathum United (assistant)
Medal record
Thailand
Sea Games
Gold medal – first place	Sea Games 2001	Football
Gold medal – first place	Sea Games 2003	Football
Gold medal – first place	Sea Games 2005	Football
Asean Football Championship
Runner-up	ASEAN Football Championship 2007	2007
Runner-up	AFF Suzuki Cup 2008	2008
Runner-up	AFF Suzuki Cup 2012	2012
- * Club domestic league appearances and goals as of 18 March 2023 ‡ National team caps and goals as of 00:49, 15 July 2025 (UTC)

Pichitphong Choeichiu (Thai: พิชิตพงษ์ เฉยฉิว, born August 28, 1982) is a Thai professional football manager and former player, who is the assistant coach of BG Pathum United.

== Club career ==
He previously spent his youth career with Suphanburi Sports College between 1997 and 1999 before moving to Krung Thai Bank /Bangkok Glass in 1999. The midfielder was promoted to the first team in 2002, and the club won two consecutive titles, in 2002–2003 and 2003–2004. Krung Thai Bank /Bangkok Glass also took part in the AFC Champions League three times between 2003 and 2008 but never progressed further than the group stage. After the championships in 2003 and 2004 the club finished empty-handed for the next four seasons, through 2008, which was Pichitphong's last season with Krung Thai Bank. He made 116 appearances and scored 39 goals for the club. In 2008, Phichitphong moved to former Thai Division 1 League champions Muangthong United. He won the Thai Premier League title twice with the Twin Qilins, in 2009 and 2010, and also won more silverware.

In December 2021, Pichitphong announcing his retirement from football at the age of 39, being played in the last game in the match with Chiangmai on the night of 8 December 2021.

== International goals ==
#	Date	Venue	Opponent	Score	Result	Competition
1.	February 22, 2003	Bangkok, Thailand	Qatar	3–1	Won	2003 King's Cup
2.	July 10, 2004	Bangkok, Thailand	Trinidad and Tobago	3–2	Won	Friendly international
3.	November 17, 2012	Bangkok, Thailand	Bangladesh	5–0	Won	Friendly international

== Honours ==
=== Club ===
Krung Thai Bank

- Thai Premier League: 2002-03, 2003-04
- Kor Royal Cup: 2003, 2004

Muangthong United

- Thai Premier League: 2009, 2010, 2012
- Kor Royal Cup: 2010

=== International ===
Thailand U-23

- Sea Games Gold Medal: 2001, 2003, 2005

Thailand

- T&T Cup: 2008
