= Anurak Srikerd =

Thai footballer and coach

Personal information
- Full name: Anurak Srikerd
- Date of birth: 15 January 1975 (age 51)
- Place of birth: Samut Prakan, Thailand
- Height: 1.84 m (6 ft 1/2 in)
- Position: Attacking midfielder

Senior career*
Years	Team	Apps	(Gls)
1996	TOT FC	27	(4)
1997–2002	BEC Tero Sasana	96	(31)
2002	Woodlands Wellington	11	(4)
2003	BEC Tero Sasana	16	(2)
2004	TOT FC	21	(6)
2004–2006	Home United	19	(13)
2006–2008	TOT FC	50	(18)
2009–2010	PTT Rayong	17	(10)
Total		257	(46)

International career
1998–2003	Thailand	72	(32)

Managerial career
- 2011: Buriram
- 2011–2012: Phattalung
- 2012: Rangsit
- 2012: F.C. Phuket
- 2013: Bangkok Glass (caretaker)
- 2013: Chiangrai United
- 2014: Bangkok Glass (caretaker)
- 2015: Thailand U19
- 2015–2016: Bangkok Glass
- 2016: Thailand U19
- 2017–2018: Khon Kaen
- 2018: Bangkok Glass
- 2019: Ayutthaya United
- 2019–2021: Thailand (assistant)
- 2023: Kasetsart
- 2026-: Monthongwittaya School
Medal record
Thailand national football team
Sea Games
Gold medal – first place	Sea Games 1999	Player
- * Club domestic league appearances and goals

Anurak Srikerd (Thai: อนุรักษ์ ศรีเกิด) is a Thai football coach and former footballer. He primary played as an attacking midfielder and was able to adapt as a striker. Besides, He is a former player of Thailand national team and scored 6 goals for the national team. He played in 10 qualifying matches for the 2002 FIFA World Cup.

== Club career ==
In Thailand, he mainly played for two clubs. TOT FC and BEC Tero Sasana F.C. With BEC-Tero he won his biggest title at club level. He was twice champion and twice runner-up. Player of the Year in 2001, he contributed significantly to winning the championship. In 2002, he moved to the Woodlands Wellington FC to Singapore in the S-League. A serious knee injury made him difficult to create and he brought it to only 11 appearances and four goals this season. He then went to play back to Thailand again for BEC Tero. Having had played from 2004 to 2005 for the TOT FC, he signed a contract again in the S-League. This time at Home United FC, where already played two other compatriots with Sutee Suksomkit and Zdravko Marinkovic. With Home United FC winning the Singapore Cup in 2005. He stayed only one season at Home United and then went back to Thailand. In 2006, he played for TOT SC again.

== International career ==
His national team career began in 1999. With the U23, they took part and won the Southeast Asian Games gold. In the same tournament he Scored his first goal for the national team in the dress. At 9–0 victory over the Philippines he scored six minutes after the 1–0. In 2000, he Participated with the national team at the Asian Cup and won with the team the King's Cup. In the final against Finland Anurak Scored three goals. The game ended 5–1

== International goals ==
List of international goals scored by Anurak Srikerd
#	Date	Venue	Opponent	Score	Result	Competition
1.	July 30, 1999	Bandar Seri Begawan, Brunei	Philippines	9–0	Won	1999 Southeast Asian Games
2.	February 27, 2000	Bangkok, Thailand	Finland	5–1	Won	King's Cup 2000
3.	February 27, 2000	Bangkok, Thailand	Finland	5–1	Won	King's Cup 2000
4.	February 27, 2000	Bangkok, Thailand	Finland	5–1	Won	King's Cup 2000
5.	November 12, 2000	Chiang Mai, Thailand	Philippines	2–0	Won	2000 Tiger Cup
6.	February 10, 2002	Bangkok, Thailand	Singapore	4–0	Won	King's Cup 2002

== Managerial statistics ==
As of 4 October 2023

Managerial record by team and tenure
Team	Nat.	From	To	Record					Ref.
Team	Nat.	From	To	G	W	D	L	Win %	Ref.
Bangkok Glass (interim)	(Thailand)	5 March 2013	3 May 2013	7	2	2	3	28.57	
Chiangrai United	(Thailand)	16 September 2013	31 October 2013	7	6	0	1	85.71	
Bangkok Glass (interim)	(Thailand)	16 June 2014	13 November 2014	21	8	4	9	38.10	
Thailand U19	(Thailand)	6 July 2015	25 November 2015	6	6	0	0	100.00	
Bangkok Glass	(Thailand)	25 November 2015	23 June 2016	21	12	2	7	57.14	
Thailand U19	(Thailand)	30 August 2016	24 September 2016	10	5	1	4	50.00	
Bangkok Glass	(Thailand)	30 April 2018	23 October 2018	28	13	6	9	46.43	
Ayutthaya United	(Thailand)	1 April 2019	30 November 2019	29	4	9	16	13.79	
Kasetsart	(Thailand)	1 March 2023	4 October 2023	18	5	5	8	27.78	
Career Total				147	61	29	57	41.50	

== Honours ==
=== Player ===
BEC Tero Sasana

- Thai Premier League: 2000, 2001–02
- Kor Royal Cup: 2000

Individual

- Thai Premier League Player of the Year (1): 2000

=== Manager ===
Bangkok Glass

- Thai FA Cup: 2014

Thailand U19

- AFF U-19 Youth Championship: 2015

Individual

- Thai Premier League Coach of the Month: October 2013
