= BEC Tero Sasana F.C. in Asia =

Statistics of BEC Tero Sasana in Asian competition.

== AFC Champions League ==
| Team | GP | W | D | L | F | A | GD | PTS |
|---|---|---|---|---|---|---|---|---|
| BEC Tero Sasana | 19 | 5 | 2 | 12 | 19 | 35 | -16 | 17 |

=== Results ===
| Season | Team 1 | Score | Team 2 | Venue |
|---|---|---|---|---|
| 2002-03 | (Thailand) BEC Tero Sasana | 2-2 | (Japan) Kashima Antlers | Suphachalasai Stadium, Thailand |
| 2002-03 | (Thailand) BEC Tero Sasana | 2-0 | (South Korea) Daejeon Citizen | Suphachalasai Stadium, Thailand |
| 2002-03 | (Thailand) BEC Tero Sasana | 2-1 | (China) Shanghai Shenhua | Suphachalasai Stadium, Thailand |
| 2002-03 | (Thailand) BEC Tero Sasana | 3-1 | (Uzbekistan) FC Pakhtakor Tashkent | Suphachalasai Stadium, Thailand |
| 2002-03 | (Uzbekistan) FC Pakhtakor Tashkent | 1-0 | (Thailand) BEC Tero Sasana | Pakhtakor Stadium, Uzbekistan |
| 2002-03 | (United Arab Emirates) Al-Ain | 2-0 | (Thailand) BEC Tero Sasana | Tahnoun Bin Mohamed Stadium, UAE |
| 2002-03 | (United Arab Emirates) Al-Ain | 2-0 | (Thailand) BEC Tero Sasana | Tahnoun Bin Mohamed Stadium, UAE |
| 2002-03 | (Thailand) BEC Tero Sasana | 1-0 | (United Arab Emirates) Al-Ain | Rajamangala Stadium, Thailand |
| 2004 | (South Korea) Jeonbuk Hyundai Motors | 4-0 | (Thailand) BEC Tero Sasana | Jeonju World Cup Stadium, South Korea |
| 2004 | (Japan) Jubilo Iwata | 3-0 | (Thailand) BEC Tero Sasana | Yamaha Stadium, Japan |
| 2004 | (Thailand) BEC Tero Sasana | 4-1 | (China) Shanghai Shenhua | Thai-Japanese Stadium, Thailand |
| 2004 | (Thailand) BEC Tero Sasana | 0-4 | (South Korea) Jeonbuk Hyundai Motors | Suphachalasai Stadium, Thailand |
| 2004 | (China) Shanghai Shenhua | 1-0 | (Thailand) BEC Tero Sasana | Shanghai Stadium, China PR |
| 2004 | (Thailand) BEC Tero Sasana | 2-3 | (Japan) Jubilo Iwata | Thai-Japanese Stadium, Thailand |
| 2005 | (Thailand) BEC Tero Sasana | 0-1 | (China) Shandong Luneng | N/A |
| 2005 | (Thailand) BEC Tero Sasana | 1-2 | (Japan) Yokohama F. Marinos | N/A |
| 2005 | (Thailand) BEC Tero Sasana | 0-1 | (Indonesia) PSM Makassar | N/A |
| 2005 | (Thailand) BEC Tero Sasana | 0-4 | (China) Shandong Luneng | N/A |
| 2005 | (Thailand) BEC Tero Sasana | 0-2 | (Japan) Yokohama F. Marinos | N/A |
| 2005 | (Thailand) BEC Tero Sasana | 2-2 | (Indonesia) PSM Makassar | N/A |

== Asian Club Championship ==
| Team | GP | W | D | L | F | A | GD | PTS |
|---|---|---|---|---|---|---|---|---|
| BEC Tero Sasana | 7 | 5 | 0 | 2 | 16 | 8 | 8 | 15 |

=== Results ===
| Season | Team 1 | Score | Team 2 |
|---|---|---|---|
| 1998-99 | (Thailand) BEC Tero Sasana | 6-1 | (Nepal) Three Star Club |
| 1998-99 | (Thailand) BEC Tero Sasana | 0-3 | (China) Dalian Wanda |
| 1998-99 | (Thailand) BEC Tero Sasana | 1-0 | (China) Dalian Wanda |
| 2001-02 | (Thailand) BEC Tero Sasana | 3-0 | Singapore Armed Forces |
| 2001-02 | (Thailand) BEC Tero Sasana | 5-1 | Singapore Armed Forces |
| 2001-02 | (Thailand) BEC Tero Sasana | 0-3 | (Japan) Kashima Antlers |
| 2001-02 | (Thailand) BEC Tero Sasana | 1-0 | (Japan) Kashima Antlers |
