= 2009 Queen's Cup =

Tournament details
- Dates: 1 February – 22 February
- Teams: 22
- Venues: 5 (in 5 host cities)

Final positions
- Champions: (South Korea) Hallelujah (1st title)
- Runners-up: (Thailand) BEC Tero Sasana

The 2009 Queen's Cup was the 33rd edition of this Thai domestic football cup competition.

The last edition was played in 2006 and won by the Rajnavy Rayong FC.

Hanyang University are the most successful club, having won the competition on seven occasions.

== Rules ==
- 20 teams have been divided into 5 groups.
- All groups have a host team where the group games will be based around.
- Group winners enter the final phase
- Chonburi FC have a bye to the final phase
- First phase is played from 1st Feb - 8th Feb
- Final phase is played 13th Feb - 22nd Feb
- 3 foreign sides will enter at the final phase

== Qualification rounds ==
The team finishing first and second in the group stages of the Queens Cup will play a knockout match on Sunday 8 February.

- Winner Group A vs. Runner up Group B
- Winner Group B vs. Runner up Group C
- Winner Group C vs. Runner up Group D
- Winner Group D vs. Runner up Group E
- Winner Group E vs. Runner up Group A

The winner will qualify for the final stage of the tournament held in Sirindhorn Stadium, Chonburi.

== Group stages ==
Winners and runners up qualify for next round

=== Group A ===
Games played at Nongprue Municipality Football Field, Pattaya

Final standings
Team	Pld	W	D	L	GF	GA	GD	Pts
(Thailand) Pattaya United	3	2	1	0	7	1	+6	7
(Thailand) BEC Tero Sasana	3	1	2	0	5	0	+5	5
(Thailand) Thai Port	3	1	1	1	5	2	+3	4
(Thailand) Raj Pracha	3	0	0	3	0	14	−14	0

==== Results ====
February 1, 2009
BEC Tero Sasana	0–0	Thai Port
Raj Pracha	0–5	Pattaya United
February 3, 2009
Pattaya United	2–1	Thai Port
Raj Pracha	0–5	BEC Tero Sasana
February 5, 2009
Raj Pracha	0–4	Thai Port
Pattaya United	0–0	BEC Tero Sasana

=== Group B ===
Games played at Ayutthaya Stadium, Ayutthaya

Final standings
Team	Pld	W	D	L	GF	GA	GD	Pts
(Thailand) PEA	3	2	1	0	5	3	+2	7
(Thailand) Royal Thai Air Force	3	2	0	1	5	4	+1	6
(Thailand) Rajnavy Rayong	3	1	1	1	5	4	+1	4
(Thailand) Sinthana	3	0	0	3	5	9	−4	0

==== Results ====
February 1, 2009
Chula United	1–3	Rajnavy Rayong
Royal Thai Air Force	0–1	PEA
February 3, 2009
Royal Thai Air Force	1–0	Rajnavy Rayong
Chula United	1–2	PEA
February 5, 2009
PEA	2–2	Rajnavy Rayong
Chula United	3–4	Royal Thai Air Force

=== Group C ===
Games played at Samut Songkhram Stadium, Samut Songkhram

Final standings
Team	Pld	W	D	L	GF	GA	GD	Pts
(Thailand) Samut Songkhram	3	2	1	0	5	2	+3	7
(Thailand) Krung Thai Bank	3	2	1	0	6	4	+2	7
(Thailand) Tobacco Monopoly	3	0	1	2	4	6	−2	1
(Thailand) Royal Thai Police	3	0	1	2	2	5	−3	1

==== Results ====
February 1, 2009
Krung Thai Bank	3–2	Tobacco Monopoly
Royal Thai Police	0–2	Samut Songkhram
February 3, 2009
Royal Thai Police	1–2	Krung Thai Bank
Tobacco Monopoly	1–2	Samut Songkhram
February 5, 2009
Tobacco Monopoly	1–1	Royal Thai Police
Krung Thai Bank	1–1	Samut Songkhram

=== Group D ===
Games played at Suphanburi Municipality Stadium, Suphanburi

Final standings
Team	Pld	W	D	L	GF	GA	GD	Pts
(Thailand) Royal Thai Army	3	1	2	0	4	1	+3	5
(Thailand) Suphanburi	3	0	3	0	3	3	0	3
(Thailand) TOT	3	0	3	0	1	1	0	3
(Thailand) Bangkok University	3	0	2	1	1	2	−1	2

==== Results ====
January 31, 2009
Royal Thai Army	2 – 2	Suphanburi
February 1, 2009
T.O.T	0–0	Bangkok University
February 4, 2009
Royal Thai Army	0–0	T.O.T
Bangkok University	0–0	Suphanburi
February 6, 2009
T.O.T	1–1	Suphanburi
Royal Thai Army	2–1	Bangkok University

=== Group E ===
Games played at Assumption College Sriracha Stadium, Chonburi

Final standings
Team	Pld	W	D	L	GF	GA	GD	Pts
(Thailand) Osotsapa M-150	3	2	0	1	8	3	+5	6
(Thailand) Haaka-Sriracha FC	3	2	0	1	5	3	+2	6
(Thailand) Raj Vithi-BG FC Sport	3	2	0	1	6	9	−3	6
(Thailand) Nakhon Pathom	3	0	0	3	2	6	−4	0

==== Results ====
February 1, 2009
Osotsapa M-150	1–0	Nakhon Pathom
Raj Vithi-BG FC Sport	2–1	Haaka-Sriracha FC
February 4, 2009
Raj Vithi-BG FC Sport	1–6	Osotsapa M-150
Nakhon Pathom	0–2	Haaka-Sriracha FC
February 6, 2009
Raj Vithi-BG FC Sport	3–2	Nakhon Pathom
Haaka-Sriracha FC	2–1	Osotsapa M-150

== Knockout round ==
5 one-off matches, winners advance to final stage.

2009-02-08
16:00 UTC+7

Samut Songkhram	2 - 1	Suphanburi

Samut Songkhram Stadium

2009-02-08
16:00 UTC+7

Osotsapa M-150	1 - 1 5-6 Penalties	BEC Tero Sasana

Assumption College Sriracha Stadium

2009-02-08
17:00 UTC+7

Pattaya United	5 - 1	Royal Thai Air Force

Nongprue Municipality Football Field

2009-02-08
18:00 UTC+7

Royal Thai Army	1 - 0	Haaka-Sriracha FC

Assumption College Sriracha Stadium

2009-02-08
18:00 UTC+7

PEA	2 - 3	Krung Thai Bank

Ayutthaya Stadium

== Final round: Group stages ==
Qualifiers:

- (South Korea) Hallelujah FC
- (South Korea) Hanyang University
- (Thailand) Pattaya United
- (Thailand) BEC Tero Sasana
- (Thailand) Chonburi
- (Thailand) Samut Songkhram
- (Thailand) Royal Thai Army
- (Thailand) Krung Thai Bank

=== Group A ===
Games played at Princess Sirindhorn Stadium, Chonburi.

Final standings
Team	Pld	W	D	L	GF	GA	GD	Pts
(Thailand) Chonburi	3	2	1	0	7	3	+4	7
(Thailand) BEC Tero Sasana	3	1	1	1	5	7	−2	4
(South Korea) Hanyang University	3	1	0	2	5	5	0	3
(Thailand) Krung Thai Bank	3	0	2	1	3	4	−1	2

==== Results ====
February 13, 2009
Chonburi	2–1	Hanyang University
Krung Thai Bank	1–1	BEC Tero Sasana
February 15, 2009
BEC Tero Sasana	3–2	Hanyang University
Krung Thai Bank	1–1	Chonburi
February 17, 2009
Hanyang University	2–1	Krung Thai Bank
Chonburi	4–1	BEC Tero Sasana

=== Group B ===
Games played at Princess Sirindhorn Stadium, Chonburi.

Final standings
Team	Pld	W	D	L	GF	GA	GD	Pts
(Thailand) Pattaya United	3	1	2	0	1	0	+1	5
(South Korea) Hallelujah FC	3	1	1	1	3	3	0	4
(Thailand) Royal Thai Army	3	1	1	1	4	2	+2	4
(Thailand) Samut Songkhram	3	0	2	1	1	4	−3	2

==== Results ====
February 14, 2009
Hallelujah	1–1	Samut Songkhram
Pattaya United	0–0	Royal Thai Army
February 16, 2009
Royal Thai Army	1–2	Hallelujah
Samut Songkhram	0–0	Pattaya United
February 18, 2009
Samut Songkhram	0–3	Royal Thai Army
Pattaya United	1–0	Hallelujah

== Semi-finals ==
2009-02-20

Pattaya United	0 - 3	BEC Tero Sasana

Princess Sirindhorn Stadium

2009-02-20

Chonburi	1 - 1 5-6 Penalties	Hallelujah FC

Princess Sirindhorn Stadium

== Final ==
2009-02-22

Hallelujah FC	1 - 0	BEC Tero Sasana

Princess Sirindhorn Stadium

== Champions ==
2009 Queen's Cup champions

First title

== See also ==
- Thailand Football Records and Statistics
