= Anon Sangsanoi =

Thai footballer (born 1984)

Personal information
- Full name: Anon Sangsanoi
- Date of birth: 1 March 1984 (age 42)
- Place of birth: Nakhon Ratchasima, Thailand
- Height: 1.76 m (5 ft 9 1/2 in)
- Position: Striker

Youth career
- 2000–2002: Chanapollakhan Technological College

Senior career*
Years	Team	Apps	(Gls)
2003–2006	North Bangkok University	63	(41)
2006–2010	BEC Tero Sasana	93	(65)
2011–2012	Muangthong United	8	(3)
2012	→ Nakhon Ratchasima (loan)	28	(8)
2013	Sisaket	3	(0)
2013–2016	Chiangrai United	74	(11)
2017	Nakhon Pathom United	17	(3)
Total		286	(131)

International career
2007	Thailand U23	5	(6)
2006–2010	Thailand	10	(2)
- * Club domestic league appearances and goals

Anon Sangsanoi (Thai: อานนท์ สังสระน้อย, born 1 March 1984), is a Thai former professional footballer who played as a striker. He was the league's top goalscorer in 2008 and 2009 seasons.

== International career ==
=== International ===
As of 12 November 2015

National team	Year	Apps	Goals
Thailand
Thailand	2008	5	2
Thailand	2009	3	0
Thailand	2010	2	0
Thailand	Total	10	2

== International goals ==
#	Date	Venue	Opponent	Score	Result	Competition
1.	December 8, 2008	Surakul Stadium, Thailand	Laos	5–0	6–0	2008 AFF Suzuki Cup
2.	December 8, 2008	Surakul Stadium, Thailand	Laos	6–0	6–0	2008 AFF Suzuki Cup

== Honours ==
=== International ===
Thailand U-23

- Sea Games Gold Medal (1): 2007

=== Individual ===
- Thai Premier League Top Scorer (2) : 2008, 2009
- Sea Games Top Scorer (1) : 2007
