= Pornchai Ardjinda =

Thai footballer

Personal information
- Full name: Pornchai Ardjinda
- Date of birth: 14 March 1984 (age 42)
- Place of birth: Ratchaburi, Thailand
- Height: 1.75 m (5 ft 9 in)
- Position: Forward

Senior career*
Years	Team	Apps	(Gls)
2009–2010	Air Force United	29	(22)
2011–2013	Ratchaburi	9	(0)
2014	Looktabfah	12	(1)
2014	Samut Songkhram	7	(0)
2015–2016	Thai Honda	24	(6)
2017	Ratchaburi Mitr Phol	0	(0)
2017	Kasetsart	8	(2)
Total		89	(31)
- * Club domestic league appearances and goals

Pornchai Ardjinda (Thai: พรชัย อาจจินดา; born March 14, 1984) is a retired professional footballer from Thailand. His nickname is Pao. He was the 2010 Thai Division 1 League 2nd highest scorer with 16 goals.

He used to be an airman in the Royal Thai Air Force. He dropped down a division in 2011 to sign for his hometown team Ratchaburi.

== Honours ==
=== Club ===
Ratchaburi

- Regional League Division 2 Champions (1) : 2011
- Thai Division 1 League Champions (1) : 2012
