= Vimol Jankam =

Thai footballer

Personal information
- Full name: Vimol Jankam
- Date of birth: 8 July 1979 (age 47)
- Place of birth: Ratchaburi, Thailand
- Height: 1.70 m (5 ft 7 in)
- Position: Striker

Youth career
- 1995: Panasonic FC
- 1996–2000: Stock Exchange of Thailand

Senior career*
Years	Team	Apps	(Gls)
2001–2005	Osotsapa		
2006	Hoàng Anh Gia Lai		
2007	Osotsapa		
2008	Coke-Bangpra		
2009–2010	Nakhon Pathom		
2011	Trang		
2011	Samut Prakan		
2012	Rajpracha		
2013	Nakhon Pathom		

International career
2002	Thailand U23		

Managerial career
- 2010: Nakhon Pathom (coach-player)
- 2013: Nakhon Pathom (coach-player)
- 2015–2017: Samutsongkhram
- 2017–2018: Rayong
- 2019: Bankhai United
- 2020–2023: Pluakdaeng United
- 2023: Pattaya United
- 2023–: Phitsanulok
- * Club domestic league appearances and goals as of 14 November 2008

Vimol Jankam (Thai: วิมล จันทร์คํา) is a former professional footballer from Thailand.

== Honours ==
Thailand U23

- 2002 Asian Games: 4th Place with Thailand national under-23 football team

Osotsapa

- Thai Premier League: Runner-up (2002, 2006) Third Place (2004, 2005)
- Queen's Cup: Champions (2002, 2003, 2004)
- Thailand FA Cup: Runners up (1999)
- Kor Royal Cup: Champions (2002, 2007)
- Thailand Premier League 2003/04 Top Scorer (14 Goals)
