= 2001–02 Thai League =

Thai Premier League
- Season: 2001–02
- Champions: BEC Tero Sasana
- Relegated: Royal Thai Navy; Royal Thai Police; Rattana Bundit
- 2002–03 AFC Champions League: BEC Tero Sasana FC; Osotsapa FC
- 2003 ASEAN Club Championship: BEC Tero Sasana FC
- Top goalscorer: Worrawoot Srimaka (BEC Tero Sasana); Pitipong Kuldilok (Port Authority of Thailand) (12)
- Biggest home win: BEC Tero Sasana 4-0; Osotsapa; Royal Thai Air Force 5-1; Sinthana; BEC Tero Sasana 4-0; Royal Thai Air Force; Osotsapa 5-1; Thailand Tobacco Monopoly; BEC Tero Sasana 4-0; Rattana Bundit
- Biggest away win: TOT 0-4 Sinthana
- Highest scoring: Royal Thai Air Force 5-1; Sinthana Osotsapa 5-1; Thailand Tobacco Monopoly (6 goals)

The 2001-02 Thai Premier League consisted of 12 teams. The bottom three clubs would be relegated and three teams promoted from the Thailand Division 1 League.

Champions BEC Tero Sasana would enter edition the next edition of the AFC Champions League. The league was restructured, to be played between October 2001 and April 2002.

The league was also known as the GSM Thai League.

== Member clubs ==
- Bangkok Bank
- BEC Tero Sasana
- Sinthana
- Krung Thai Bank
- Osotsapa M-150
- Port Authority of Thailand
- Royal Thai Navy
- Rattana Bundit (renamed from - Bangkok Metropolitan Administration)
- Royal Thai Air Force
- Royal Thai Police
- Thailand Tobacco Monopoly (promoted from Division 1)
- TOT
Locations of the Thai Premier League 2001–02 teams

== Final league table ==
Pos	Team	Pld	W	D	L	GF	GA	GD	Pts	Qualification or relegation
1	BEC Tero Sasana (Note: Defending champion)	22	15	5	2	41	11	+30	50	Champion and Qualification for the 2002–03 AFC Champions League
2	Osotsapa	22	13	5	4	34	21	+13	44	Qualification for the 2002–03 AFC Champions League
3	Bangkok Bank	22	9	8	5	21	17	+4	35	
4	Royal Thai Air Force	22	8	8	6	23	21	+2	32	
5	Sinthana	22	6	12	4	25	21	+4	30	
6	Port Authority	22	6	10	6	26	23	+3	28	
7	Krung Thai Bank	22	7	7	8	23	23	0	28	
8	Tobacco Monopoly (Note: Promoted from last season)	22	8	2	12	24	35	−11	26	
9	TOT	22	6	6	10	18	24	−6	24	
10	Royal Thai Navy	22	6	3	13	14	31	−17	21	Relegation spot
11	Royal Thai Police	22	4	7	11	16	24	−8	19	Relegation spot
12	Rattana Bundit	22	3	9	10	10	24	−14	18	Relegation spot

Source: rsssf.com
Rules for classification: 1st points; 2nd head-to-head; 3rd goal difference; 4th goals scored

== Season notes ==
Bangkok Metropolitan Administration withdrew from the league due to a lack of money. Rattana Bundit was formed off the back of BMA and took their place in the Premier League. This was the second season running that a club would withdraw following on from Thai Farmers Bank

== Queen's Cup ==
Osotsapa won their first Queen's Cup trophy. This was the 29th edition to be played.

== Asian Representation ==
- BEC Tero Sasana would progress to the second round of the 2001–02 Asian Club Championship, but once again came up against, what now seemed to be an impossible mission of facing a team from Japan. Here, they would get beat once again by Kashima Antlers who now seemed to be a thorn in the side of Thai football clubs.
- Royal Thai Air Force reached the second round of the 2001–02 Asian Cup Winners Cup, where they were beaten by Home United of Singapore in a match played over two legs. They won the first leg at home, but then were thumped 5-0 in the return in Singapore.

== Annual awards ==
=== Coach of the Year ===
- (Thailand) Attaphol Buspakom - BEC Tero Sasana

=== Player of the year ===
- (Thailand) Apichad Thaveechalermdit - Bangkok Bank

=== Top scorer ===
- (Thailand) Worrawoot Srimaka - 12 Goals BEC Tero Sasana
- Pitipong Kuldilok - 12 Goals Port Authority of Thailand

== Champions ==
The league champion was BEC Tero Sasana. It was the team's second title.

Preceded by Thai Premier League; 2000	Thai Premier League; 2001–02; Sinthana	Succeeded by Thai Premier League; 2002–03
