= 2003–04 Thai League =

Thai Premier League
- Season: 2003–04
- Dates: 27 December 2003 – 11 August 2004
- Champions: Krung Thai Bank
- Relegated: Royal Thai Air Force; Sinthana
- 2005 AFC Champions League: Krung Thai Bank FC; BEC Tero Sasana FC
- 2005 ASEAN Club Championship: Thailand Tobacco Monopoly FC
- Top goalscorer: (Thailand) Vimon Jancam (Osotsapa) (14)
- Biggest home win: Krung Thai Bank 6-1; Sinthana; Osotsapa 5-0 Sinthana
- Biggest away win: Royal Thai Air Force 0-5; Bangkok Bank
- Highest scoring: Port Authority of Thailand 5-4 Osotsapa (9 goals)

The 2003–04 Thai Premier League had 10 teams. Two clubs would be relegated and 2 teams promoted from Thailand Division 1 League. The team that finished in 8th position would play in a relegation play-off.

== Member clubs ==
- Bangkok Bank
- Bangkok University (promoted from Division 1)
- BEC Tero Sasana
- Sinthana
- Krung Thai Bank
- Osotsapa M-150
- Port Authority of Thailand
- Royal Thai Air Force
- Royal Thai Navy (promoted from Division 1)
- Thailand Tobacco Monopoly
Locations of the Thai Premier League 2003–04 teams

== Final league table ==
Pos	Team	Pld	W	D	L	GF	GA	GD	Pts	Qualification or relegation
1	Krung Thai Bank (Note: Defending champion)	18	12	2	4	33	18	+15	38	Champion and Qualification for the 2005 AFC Champions League
2	BEC Tero Sasana	18	10	4	4	33	22	+11	34	Qualification for the 2005 AFC Champions League
3	Osotsapa M-150	18	10	3	5	43	23	+20	33	
4	Bangkok University (Note: Promoted from last season)	18	9	4	5	26	22	+4	31	
5	Port Authority	18	9	1	8	29	28	+1	28	
6	Bangkok Bank	18	7	5	6	28	21	+7	26	
7	Royal Thai Navy	18	5	4	9	18	27	−9	19	
8	Tobacco Monopoly	18	4	7	7	16	18	−2	19	
9	Royal Thai Air Force	18	4	4	10	14	38	−24	16	Relegation spot
10	Sinthana	18	2	2	14	18	41	−23	8	Relegation spot

Source: rsssf.com
Rules for classification: 1st points; 2nd head-to-head; 3rd goal difference; 4th goals scored

== Queen's Cup ==
Osotsapa FC again won the Queen's Cup. This was their third success in a row.

== Asian Representation ==
- Again in another revamped and expanded Asian Champions League, last years runners up BEC Tero Sasana met their match and came bottom of a tough group comprising sides from China, South Korea and Japan. Krung Thai Bank also entered this year and came in second place in their group, although still not good enough to qualify for the knockout stages.

== Annual awards ==
=== Coach of the Year ===
- (Thailand) Worrawoot Dangsamer - Krung Thai Bank

=== Player of the year ===
- (Thailand) Pichitphong Choeichiu - Krung Thai Bank

=== Top scorer ===
- (Thailand) Vimol Jankam - 14 Goals Osotsapa M 150

== Champions ==
The league champion was Krung Thai Bank. It was the second time the team won the title.

Preceded by Thai League; 2002–03	Thai Premier League; 2003–04; Krung Thai Bank	Succeeded by Thai League; 2004–05
