= 2004 AFC Champions League =

23rd edition of premier club football tournament organized by the AFC

Tournament details
- Dates: 10 February – 1 December 2004
- Teams: 26

Final positions
- Champions: (Saudi Arabia) Al-Ittihad (1st title)
- Runners-up: (South Korea) Seongnam Ilhwa Chunma

Tournament statistics
- Matches played: 80
- Goals scored: 252 (3.15 per match)
- Top scorer(s): Kim Do-hoon (9 goals)
- Best player: Redha Tukar

The 2004 AFC Champions League was the 23rd edition of the top-level Asian club football tournament and the 2nd edition under the current AFC Champions League title. The title was won by Al-Ittihad who defeated Seongnam Ilhwa Chunma in the final.

Al Ain were the defending champions, but were eliminated by Jeonbuk Hyundai Motors in the quarter-finals.

== Format ==
Group Stage

A total of 28 clubs were divided into seven groups of four, based on region i.e. East Asian and Southeast Asian clubs were drawn in groups E to G, while the rest were grouped in groups A to D. Each club played double round-robin (home and away) against fellow three group members, a total of six matches each. Clubs received three points for a win, one for a draw, and zero for a loss. The clubs were ranked according to points and tie breakers were in the following order:

1. Points in head-to-head matches among the tied teams;
2. Goal difference in head-to-head matches among the tied teams;
3. Goals scored in head-to-head matches among the tied teams;
4. Goal difference in all group matches;
5. Goals scored in all group matches;

The seven group winners along with the defending champion (Al Ain) advanced to the quarter-finals.

Knockout stage

An open draw was held for the knockout stage; teams from the same group or the same association could not be drawn against each other. Each tie is played on a home-and-away two-legged basis. The away goals rule, extra time and penalty shoot-outs were used to decide the winner if necessary.

== Teams ==
For this year the competition was restricted to clubs from countries considered 'mature' in the 'Vision Asia' paper of AFC President Mohamed Bin Hammam, with clubs from 'developing' countries entering the newly created AFC Cup and 'emerging' nations to enter the AFC President's Cup from 2005 onwards.

Mature countries

- Bahrain
- China
- Indonesia
- Iran
- Iraq
- Japan
- Kuwait
- Qatar
- Saudi Arabia
- South Korea
- Thailand
- United Arab Emirates
- Uzbekistan
- Vietnam

Developing countries

- Bangladesh
- Hong Kong
- India
- Jordan
- Lebanon
- Malaysia
- Maldives
- Myanmar
- North Korea
- Oman
- Singapore
- Syria
- Turkmenistan
- Yemen

Emerging countries

- Afghanistan
- Bhutan
- Brunei
- Cambodia
- Timor-Leste
- Guam
- Kyrgyzstan
- Laos
- Macau
- Mongolia
- Nepal
- Pakistan
- Palestine
- Philippines
- Sri Lanka
- Taiwan
- Tajikistan

=== Qualified Teams ===
West Asia		East Asia	
Quarter Finals
Team	Qualifying method	Team	Qualifying method
(United Arab Emirates) Al Ain	2002–03 AFC Champions League champions		
Group Stage
Team	Qualifying method	Team	Qualifying method
(Bahrain) Riffa	2002–03 Bahraini Premier League champions	(China) Shanghai Shenhua	2003 Chinese Jia-A League champions
(Bahrain) Al-Ahli	2003 King's Cup winners	(China) Dalian Shide	2002 Chinese Jia-A League champions
(Iran) Sepahan	2002–03 Iran Pro League champions	(Indonesia) Persik Kediri	2003 Liga Indonesia Premier Division champions
(Iran) Zob Ahan	2002–03 Hazfi Cup winners	(Indonesia) PSM Makassar	2003 Liga Indonesia Premier Division runners-up
(Iraq) Al-Shorta	Chosen by the Iraq Football Association	(Japan) Yokohama F. Marinos	2003 J.League Division 1 champions
(Iraq) Al-Quwa Al-Jawiya	Chosen by the Iraq Football Association	(Japan) Júbilo Iwata	2003 Emperor's Cup winners
(Kuwait) Al Qadisiya	2002–03 Kuwaiti Premier League champions 2003 Kuwait Emir Cup winners	(South Korea) Seongnam Ilhwa Chunma	2003 K League champions
(Kuwait) Al-Arabi	2002–03 Kuwaiti Premier League runners-up	(South Korea) Jeonbuk Hyundai Motors	2003 Korean FA Cup winners
Qatar SC	2002–03 Qatar Stars League champions	(Thailand) Krung Thai Bank	2002–03 Thai League champions
(Qatar) Al Sadd	2002–03 Emir of Qatar Cup winners	(Thailand) BEC-Tero Sasana	2002–03 Thai League runners-up
(Saudi Arabia) Al-Ittihad	2002–03 Saudi Premier League champions	(Vietnam) Hoang Anh Gia Lai	2003 V-League champions
(Saudi Arabia) Al Hilal	2003 Saudi Crown Prince Cup winners	(Vietnam) Binh Dinh	2003 Vietnamese Cup winners
(United Arab Emirates) Al-Wahda	2002–03 UAE Football League runners-up		
(United Arab Emirates) Sharjah	2002–03 UAE President's Cup winners		
(Uzbekistan) Pakhtakor	2003 Uzbek League champions 2003 Uzbekistan Cup winners		
(Uzbekistan) Neftchi Fergana	2003 Uzbek League runners-up		

Notes

1. Iraq (IRQ): The 2002–03 Iraqi First Division League was stopped on 28 March 2003 as a result of the 2003 invasion of Iraq and the overthrow of Saddam Hussein's government which led to the formation of a new IFA committee. Al-Shorta and Al-Najaf were first and second respectively at the outbreak of the war and so were chosen to represent Iraq in the AFC Champions League. However the IFA later deemed that Al-Najaf were not ready to participate and thus gave the slot to Al-Quwa Al-Jawiya who were 5th at the time of the cancellation and the next highest-placed team in the table that had not already been admitted into a continental or regional competition.
2. United Arab Emirates (UAE): As 2002–03 UAE Football League champions, Al Ain, qualified for the AFC Champions League as defending champions, the spot reserved for the UAE Football League champions was passed onto the runners-up of the league.

== Group stage ==
Location of teams of the 2004 AFC Champions League.
Brown: Group A; Red: Group B; Orange: Group C; Yellow: Group D; Pink: Group E;
Green: Group F; Blue: Group G; Cyan: Quarter-finals;

=== Group A ===
Pos	Team	Pld	W	D	L	GF	GA	GD	Pts	Qualification	PAK	ZOB	QAT	RIF
1	(Uzbekistan) Pakhtakor	4	2	1	1	3	1	+2	7	Advance to knockout stage	—	2–0	1–0	~~Canc.~~
2	(Iran) Zob Ahan	4	1	2	1	4	5	−1	5		1–0	—	3–3	~~Canc.~~
3	Qatar SC	4	0	3	1	3	4	−1	3		0–0	0–0	—	~~2–0~~
4	(Bahrain) Riffa	0	0	0	0	0	0	0	0 (Note: Riffa withdrew a week prior to their match against Pakhtakor, citing security concerns. They were banned from AFC competitions for two years, and their record was expunged.)	Club withdrew, record expunged	~~Canc.~~	~~0–0~~	~~Canc.~~	—

=== Group B ===
Pos	Team	Pld	W	D	L	GF	GA	GD	Pts	Qualification	WAH	SAD	QWJ	QAD
1	(United Arab Emirates) Al-Wahda	4	1	3	0	3	0	+3	6	Advance to knockout stage	—	0–0	3–0	~~Canc.~~
2	(Qatar) Al Sadd	4	1	2	1	1	1	0	5		0–0	—	1–0	~~0–1~~
3	(Iraq) Al-Quwa Al-Jawiya	4	1	1	2	1	4	−3	4		0–0	1–0	—	~~0–1~~
4	(Kuwait) Al Qadisiya	0	0	0	0	0	0	0	0 (Note: On 20 April, following the match between Al-Qadisiya and Al-Sadd, Kuwaiti security personnel and police assaulted the visiting players; Al-Qadisiya were ejected from the competition and banned from AFC competitions for three years. Their record was expunged.)		~~1–3~~	~~0–0~~	~~1–0~~	—

=== Group C ===
Pos	Team	Pld	W	D	L	GF	GA	GD	Pts	Qualification	SHA	HIL	SHR	AHL
1	(United Arab Emirates) Sharjah	4	3	1	0	10	4	+6	10	Advance to knockout stage	—	5–2	2–0	~~Canc.~~
2	(Saudi Arabia) Al-Hilal	4	2	1	1	6	6	0	7		0–0	—	2–0	~~Canc.~~
3	(Iraq) Al-Shorta	4	0	0	4	3	9	−6	0		2–3	1–2	—	~~Canc.~~
4	(Bahrain) Al-Ahli	0	0	0	0	0	0	0	0 (Note: Al-Ahli were forced to withdraw after the Bahraini FA called up seven of their players for the national team and Olympic squads for their World Cup and Olympic Games qualifying matches.)		~~Canc.~~	~~Canc.~~	~~Canc.~~	—

=== Group D ===
Pos	Team	Pld	W	D	L	GF	GA	GD	Pts	Qualification	ITJ	SEP	ARB	NEF
1	(Saudi Arabia) Al-Ittihad	6	4	1	1	14	4	+10	13 (Note: Tied on head-to-head points (3). Head-to-head goal difference: Al-Ittihad +3, Sepahan −3.)	Advance to knockout stage	—	4–0	2–0	3–0
2	(Iran) Sepahan	6	4	1	1	15	10	+5	13		3–2	—	3–1	4–0
3	(Kuwait) Al-Arabi	6	2	2	2	8	10	−2	8		0–0	2–2	—	3–2
4	(Uzbekistan) Neftchi	6	0	0	6	5	18	−13	0		1–3	1–3	1–2	—

=== Group E ===
Pos	Team	Pld	W	D	L	GF	GA	GD	Pts	Qualification	JHM	JUB	SHA	BEC
1	(South Korea) Jeonbuk Hyundai Motors	6	4	0	2	14	5	+9	12 (Note: Tied on head-to-head points (3). Head-to-head goal difference: Jeonbuk Hyundai Motors +1, Jubilo Iwata −1.)	Advance to knockout stage	—	1–2	0–1	4–0
2	(Japan) Jubilo Iwata	6	4	0	2	14	11	+3	12		2–4	—	2–1	3–0
3	(China) Shanghai Shenhua	6	3	0	3	7	9	−2	9		0–1	3–2	—	1–0
4	(Thailand) BEC Tero	6	1	0	5	6	16	−10	3		0–4	2–3	4–1	—

=== Group F ===
Pos	Team	Pld	W	D	L	GF	GA	GD	Pts	Qualification	DLS	KTB	HAG	PSM
1	(China) Dalian Shide	6	5	0	1	11	5	+6	15	Advance to knockout stage	—	3–1	2–0	2–1
2	(Thailand) Krung Thai Bank	6	2	1	3	8	11	−3	7 (Note: Head-to-head points: Krung Thai Bank 4, Hoang Anh Gia Lai 1.)		0–2	—	2–2	1–2
3	(Vietnam) Hoang Anh Gia Lai	6	2	1	3	10	10	0	7		3–1	0–1	—	5–1
4	(Indonesia) PSM Makassar	6	2	0	4	9	12	−3	6		0–1	2–3	3–0	—

=== Group G ===
Pos	Team	Pld	W	D	L	GF	GA	GD	Pts	Qualification	SEO	MAR	PSK	BDN
1	(South Korea) Seongnam Ilhwa Chunma	6	5	0	1	24	4	+20	15 (Note: Tied on head-to-head results. Overall goal difference is used as the tiebreaker.)	Advance to knockout stage	—	0–1	15–0	2–0
2	(Japan) Yokohama F. Marinos	6	5	0	1	19	3	+16	15		1–2	—	4–0	6–0
3	(Indonesia) Persik Kediri	6	1	1	4	5	27	−22	4		1–2	1–4	—	1–0
4	(Vietnam) Binh Dinh	6	0	1	5	3	17	−14	1		1–3	0–3	2–2	—

== Knock-out stage ==
=== Bracket ===
Quarter finals
(China) Dalian Shide	1	0	1
(Saudi Arabia) Al-Ittihad	1	1	2
(United Arab Emirates) Al-Ain	0	1	1
(South Korea) Jeonbuk Hyundai Motors	1	4	5
(South Korea) Seongnam Ilhwa Chunma	6	5	11
(United Arab Emirates) Sharjah	0	2	2
(United Arab Emirates) Al-Wahda	1	0	1
(Uzbekistan) Pakhtakor	1	4	5

Semi-finals
(Saudi Arabia) Al-Ittihad	2	2	4
(South Korea) Jeonbuk Hyundai Motors	1	2	3
(South Korea) Seongnam Ilhwa Chunma	0	2	2
(Uzbekistan) Pakhtakor	0	0	0

Final
(Saudi Arabia) Al-Ittihad	1	5	6
(South Korea) Seongnam Ilhwa Chunma	3	0	3

=== Quarter-finals ===
The first legs were played on 14 and 15 September, and the second legs were played on 21 and 22 September 2004.

Team 1	Agg.	Team 2	1st leg	2nd leg
Al-Ain (United Arab Emirates)	1–5	(South Korea) Jeonbuk Hyundai Motors	0–1	1–4
Dalian Shide (China)	1–2	(Saudi Arabia) Al-Ittihad	1–1	0–1
Al-Wahda (United Arab Emirates)	1–5	(Uzbekistan) Pakhtakor	1–1	0–4
Seongnam Ilhwa Chunma (South Korea)	11–2	(United Arab Emirates) Sharjah	6–0	5–2

==== Matches ====
14 September 2004

Al-Ain (United Arab Emirates)	0–1	(South Korea) Jeonbuk Hyundai Motors
		Gomes 90+3'

Tahnoun Bin Mohamed Stadium, Al Ain
21 September 2004

Jeonbuk Hyundai Motors (South Korea)	4–1	(United Arab Emirates) Al-Ain
Namkung Do 53'; Paulo Rink 69'; Gomes 90+1'; Park Dong-Hyuk 90+3'		Yaslam 88'

Jeonju World Cup Stadium, Jeonju

Jeonbuk Hyundai Motors won 5–1 on aggregate.

14 September 2004

Dalian Shide (China)	1–1	(Saudi Arabia) Al-Ittihad
Zou Jie 66'		Carević 25'

People's Stadium, Dalian
21 September 2004

Al-Ittihad (Saudi Arabia)	1–0	(China) Dalian Shide
Tukar 68'

Prince Abdullah Al Faisal Stadium, Jeddah

Al-Ittihad won 2–1 on aggregate.

15 September 2004

Al-Wahda (United Arab Emirates)	1–1	(Uzbekistan) Pakhtakor
Koutouan 10'		Magdeev 85'

Al-Nahyan Stadium, Abu Dhabi
22 September 2004

Pakhtakor (Uzbekistan)	4–0	(United Arab Emirates) Al-Wahda
Soliev 21'; Shishelov 44', 90'; Salem 86' (o.g.)

Pakhtakor Stadium, Tashkent

Pakhtakor won 5–1 on aggregate.

15 September 2004

Seongnam Ilhwa Chunma (South Korea)	6–0	(United Arab Emirates) Sharjah
Kim Do-Hoon 20'; Lee Ki-Hyung 49'; Dudu 52', 65' (pen.); Do Jae-Joon 81'; Laktionov 89'

Seongnam 2 Stadium, Seongnam
22 September 2004

Sharjah (United Arab Emirates)	2–5	(South Korea) Seongnam Ilhwa Chunma
Ndaye 44'; Anderson 66'		Dudu 11', 25'; Marcelo 20'; Kim Do-Hoon 32'; Laktionov 74'

Sharjah Stadium, Sharjah

Seongnam Ilhwa Chunma won 11–2 on aggregate.

=== Semifinals ===
The first legs were played on 19 and 20 October, and the second legs were played on 26 and 27 October 2004.

Team 1	Agg.	Team 2	1st leg	2nd leg
Al-Ittihad (Saudi Arabia)	4–3	(South Korea) Jeonbuk Hyundai Motors	2–1	2–2
Seongnam Ilhwa Chunma (South Korea)	2–0	(Uzbekistan) Pakhtakor	0–0	2–0

==== Matches ====
19 October 2004

Al-Ittihad (Saudi Arabia)	2–1	(South Korea) Jeonbuk Hyundai Motors
Noor 27'; Montashari 87'		Botti 85'

Prince Abdullah Al Faisal Stadium, Jeddah
26 October 2004

Jeonbuk Hyundai Motors (South Korea)	2–2	(Saudi Arabia) Al-Ittihad
Rink 32'; Botti 43'		Tcheco 68' (pen.); Osama 89'

Jeonju World Cup Stadium, Jeonju

Al-Ittihad won 4–3 on aggregate.

20 October 2004

Seongnam Ilhwa Chunma (South Korea)	0–0	(Uzbekistan) Pakhtakor

Seongnam 2 Stadium, Seongnam
27 October 2004

Pakhtakor (Uzbekistan)	0–2	(South Korea) Seongnam Ilhwa Chunma
		Kim Do-Hoon 37'; Dudu 56'

Pakhtakor Stadium, Tashkent

Seongnam Ilhwa Chunma won 2–0 on aggregate.

=== Final ===
The first leg was played on 24 November, and the second leg was played on 1 December 2004.

Team 1	Agg.	Team 2	1st leg	2nd leg
Al-Ittihad (Saudi Arabia)	6–3	(South Korea) Seongnam Ilhwa Chunma	1–3	5–0

==== Matches ====
24 November 2004

Al-Ittihad (Saudi Arabia)	1–3	(South Korea) Seongnam Ilhwa Chunma
Tukar 28'		Laktionov 26'; Kim Do-Hoon 80'; Jang Hak-Young 88'

Prince Abdullah Al Faisal Stadium, Jeddah
1 December 2004

Seongnam Ilhwa Chunma (South Korea)	0–5	(Saudi Arabia) Al-Ittihad
		Tukar 29'; Idris 45+4'; Noor 56', 78'; Abushgeer 90+5'

Seongnam Stadium, Seongnam

Al-Ittihad won 6–3 on aggregate.

== See also ==
- 2004 AFC Cup
