= 2000 Thai Premier League =

Thai Premier League
- Season: 2000
- Dates: 28 May – 26 August
- Champions: BEC Tero Sasana
- Relegated: -
- 2001–02 Asian Club Championship: BEC Tero Sasana
- 2001–02 Asian Cup Winners Cup: Royal Thai Air Force FC
- Top goalscorer: (Thailand) Sutee Suksomkit (Thai Farmers Bank) (16)
- Biggest home win: BEC Tero Sasana 5-0; Sinthana
- Biggest away win: Krung Thai Bank 0-6; BEC Tero Sasana
- Highest scoring: TOT 3-6 Bangkok Metropolitan Administration (9 goals)

The 2000 Thai Premier League consisted of 12 teams. The bottom club would be relegated to the Thailand Division 1 League. The club that came 11th would play in a relegation / promotion match against the club that came second in the Thailand Division 1 League.

Champions Royal Thai Air Force entered the next edition of the Asian Club Championship.

The league was also known as the Caltex Premier League.

== Member clubs ==
- Bangkok Bank
- Bangkok Metropolitan Administration
- BEC Tero Sasana
- Krung Thai Bank
- Osotsapa M-150
- Port Authority of Thailand
- Royal Thai Air Force
- Royal Thai Navy (promoted from Division 1)
- Royal Thai Police (promoted from Division 1)
- Sinthana
- Thai Farmers Bank
- TOT
Locations of the Thai Premier League 2000 teams

== Final league table ==
Pos	Team	Pld	W	D	L	GF	GA	GD	Pts	Qualification or relegation
1	BEC Tero Sasana	22	14	7	1	48	14	+34	49	Champion and Qualification for the 2001–02 Asian Club Championship
2	Royal Thai Air Force (Note: Defending champion)	22	12	5	5	34	19	+15	41	
3	Thai Farmers Bank	22	10	7	5	33	25	+8	37	Withdrew from the league and folded (Note: Thai Farmers Bank withdrew from the league at the end of the season and folded.)
4	Bangkok Metropolitan	22	9	8	5	39	29	+10	35	
5	Port Authority	22	8	6	8	18	21	−3	30	
6	Royal Thai Navy (Note: Promoted from last season)	22	5	11	6	21	22	−1	26	
7	Royal Thai Police	22	6	8	8	25	27	−2	26	
8	Osotsapa	22	6	8	8	15	20	−5	26	
9	Bangkok Bank	22	6	7	9	14	23	−9	25	
10	Krung Thai Bank	22	6	3	13	21	40	−19	21	
11	Sinthana (Note: Sinthana would not be relegated to the Thailand Division 1 League by taking the place of Thai Farmers Bank in the league.)	22	4	8	10	20	32	−12	20	
12	TOT	22	6	2	14	26	42	−16	20	Qualification for the promotion/relegation playoff (Note: The team that came 12th (TOT) qualified for the promotion/relegation playoff with the runner-up of the Thailand Division 1 League (Bangkok Christian College).)

Source: rsssf.com
Rules for classification: 1st points; 2nd head-to-head; 3rd goal difference; 4th goals scored

== Promotion and relegation playoff ==
The club that came 11th in the Thai Premier League was to play in a relegation / promotion match against the runner-up in the Thailand Division 1 League, but at the end of the season, Thai Farmers Bank dropped out of the league and folded.

As such, Sinthana, the club that came 11th, took their place, while TOT, the team that came 12th, would play in the relegation / promotion match.

March 27 and March 31, 2001

Team 1	Result	Team 2
† TOT	4-0	Bangkok Christian College

† TOT remain in the Thai Premier League.

== Season notes ==
Thai Farmers Bank would withdraw from the league at the end of the season due to the Asian financial crisis that initial struck in 1998. The effects would spread across Asia and many clubs now came under a huge financial burden.

== Queen's Cup ==
Bangkok Bank won the 27th edition of the Queen's Cup and their third title overall. They defeated Sinthana 5–3 on penalties after a 2–2 draw played at Suphachalasai Stadium.

== Thailand FA Cup ==
BEC Tero Sasana won their first Thailand FA Cup. It is unclear whom they beat in the final.

== Asian Representation ==
- Royal Thai Air Force would progress to the second round of the 2000–01 Asian Club Championship, but only on the virtue of receiving a bye in the first round. Here, they would get beat once again by PSM Ujungpandang of Indonesia.
- BEC Tero Sasana reached the Quarter-finals of the 2000–01 Asian Cup Winners Cup, where they were beaten by Shimizu S-Pulse of Japan in a match played over two legs. They drew the first leg at home, but were overcome in Japan.

== Annual awards ==
=== Coach of the Year ===
- (Thailand) Pichai Pituwong - BEC Tero Sasana

=== Player of the year ===
- (Thailand) Anurak Srikerd - BEC Tero Sasana

=== Top scorer ===
- (Thailand) Sutee Suksomkit - 16 Goals Thai Farmers Bank

== Champions ==
The league champion was BEC Tero Sasana. It was the team's first title.

Preceded by Thai Premier League; 1999	Thai Premier League; 2000; BEC Tero Sasana	Succeeded by Thai Premier League; 2001–02
