= Pitipong Kuldilok =

Thai footballer

Personal information
- Full name: Pitipong Kuldilok
- Date of birth: 8 February 1980 (age 46)
- Place of birth: Khon Kaen, Thailand
- Height: 1.84 m (6 ft 1/2 in)
- Positions: Forward; striker

Senior career*
Years	Team	Apps	(Gls)
2000–2001	Port Authority of Thailand		
2002–2004	Sembawang Rangers		
2005	East Asia Bank		
2006	Geylang United		
2007–2013	Thai Port	85	(24)
2014	Samut Prakan	6	(0)

International career
2000–2002	Thailand	10	(2)
- * Club domestic league appearances and goals as of 17 July 2008

Pitipong Kuldilok (Thai: ปิติพงษ์ กุลดิลก) is a Thai former football player.

== Honours ==
SEA Games Winner

2003 - Thailand

Thai FA Cup Winner

2009 - Thai Port FC

== International goals ==
#	Date	Venue	Opponent	Score	Result	Competition
1.	February 10, 2002	Bangkok, Thailand	Singapore	4-0	Won	King's Cup 2002
2.	February 12, 2002	Bangkok, Thailand	Qatar	1-0	Won	King's Cup 2002
