= Thai League 1 =

National football league

- Organising body: Thai League Co., Ltd.
- Founded: 1996; 30 years ago
- First season: 1996–97
- Country: Thailand
- Confederation: AFC
- Number of clubs: 16
- Level on pyramid: 1
- Relegation to: Thai League 2
- Domestic cup(s): Thai FA Cup; Thailand Champions Cup
- League cup: Thai League Cup
- International cups: AFC Champions League Elite; AFC Champions League Two; ASEAN Club Championship
- Current champions: Buriram United (12th title) (2025–26)
- Most championships: Buriram United (12 titles)
- Most appearances: Rangsan Viwatchaichok (439)
- Top scorer: Heberty (159)
- Broadcaster: Advanced Info Service
- Website: thaileague.co.th
- Current: 2026–27 Thai League 1

The Thai League (Thai: ไทยลีก, pronounced as ไท-หลีก) or Thai League 1 (Thai: ไทยลีก 1, pronounced as ไท-หลีก-หนึ่ง), often referred to as T1, is the highest level of the Thai football league system. Contested by 16 clubs, it operates on a system of promotion and relegation with Thai League 2. Seasons typically run from August to May, with each team playing 30 games: two against each other team, one home and one away. It is sponsored by BYD Auto and therefore officially known as the BYD Sealion 6 League I. In the Thai League, most games are played on Saturday and Sunday evenings, occasionally being played on Wednesday and Friday evening fixtures.

== History ==
=== Origins (1916–1995) ===
Thailand has had organized football competition since 1916, when the Football Association of Thailand (then known as the Siam Football Association) established the first official tournament. The Kor Royal Cup (Thai: ถ้วย ก., "Cup Kor") served as the premier football competition from 1916 to 1995, operating as a knockout tournament rather than a league system. During this 79-year period, the tournament underwent several format changes, initially featuring only Bangkok-based clubs before expanding to include provincial teams in the 1960s.

The transition from cup to league format was driven by the need to modernize Thai football and meet Asian Football Confederation (AFC) standards for professional competitions. The semi-professional nature of the Kor Royal Cup, with its limited schedule and lack of home-and-away fixtures, was seen as inadequate for developing Thai football to international standards.

=== Foundation (1996–2007) ===
Thai League was introduced in 1996 by the Football Association of Thailand (FA Thailand) under the name Thailand Soccer League. Eighteen clubs who earlier competed for the Kor Royal Cup were registered to play in the first edition of a double round-robin league system. Bangkok Bank was crowned as the first champion of the 1996–97 Thailand Soccer League.

The Thai League originally had 10 to 12 clubs each season until 2007, when it was expanded to 16 clubs. At the end of each season, the three bottom placed clubs are relegated to the Thai Division 1 League.

=== Leagues integration (2007) ===
Most of Thai League clubs in that time were the organisation of government authorities club that based in Greater Bangkok and Metropolitan. Meanwhile, the other local clubs had competed in the semi-pro league called the Provincial League. Thai Premier League faced the issue of low attendance and lack of local loyalties while the Provincial league suffered the financial issue. In 2007, Thai League was integrated with Provincial League completely. Chonburi from the Provincial League was the first champion of the new Thailand Premier League in the 2007 season.

=== Modern era (2009–present) ===
In 2009 season, there were significant changes in the lead to the new era of the Thai Premier League. Asian Football Confederation declared the regulations for the associations that have the intention to send the clubs to compete in the AFC Champions League starting from 2011. Football Association of Thailand had to establish Thai Premier League Co., Ltd. and forced the clubs in the top league to complete AFC Club License Criteria otherwise Thai clubs will not eligible to play in the Champions League. Clubs were forced to separate themselves from the parent organisations and registered as the independent football authorities.

The massive changes occurred in that season. Thailand Premier League renamed to Thai Premier League. Two times league champion Krung Thai Bank failed to complete the new regulations. The organisation decided to sell the club. The club was acquired by Boon Rawd and rebranded to be Bangkok Glass. Bangkok University had expelled their football club section. The club rebrand itself to Bangkok United since then. The organisation-based clubs had to relocate to find the local supporters to backup the clubs. Osotspa changed their home stadium to Saraburi Province, TOT moved to play in Kanchanaburi, Royal Navy played in Rayong Province while Thailand Tobacco Monopoly integrated to Samut Sakhon Province and rebranded to TTM Samut Sakhon.

Muangthong United were promoted from Thai Division 1 League in that season and won Thai Premier League in their first year in the top league.

==== Thailand Clasico ====
Thailand Clasico or The Classic Match of Thailand is the matchup between Muangthong United and Chonburi. It is the matchup that presents Thai football in the modern era. The name was given to the encounter of two teams due to the hype and massive atmosphere around the match. The first encounter between them happened in the 2009 Thai Premier League season. On 30 May 2009, Chonburi that was regarded as the best club in Thailand at that moment hosted the new powerhouse who were just promoted from Division 1 Muangthong United. The match was played at Nong Prue Stadium, Pattaya. Before the match, Chonburi was the leader in the table after 10 matches of the season while Muangthong followed in second with one less point. Chonburi made the lead by 2–0 in the first thirty minutes but Muangthong bounced back to win by the 5–2 result at the end.

==== The first invincible ====
In the 2012 season, Muangthong United under Serbian head coach Slaviša Jokanović, had become the first club in the league history that completed the season with an unbeaten record. Muangthong finished at the top of the final standing with 25 wins and 9 draws.

==== Buriram dominance ====
The Buriram Dominance refers to the 2013 to 2015 season, when Buriram United won Thai Premier League in three consecutive seasons as the first club in the league history. The three titles in that period included two invincible titles which Buriram United completed Thai Premier League campaign unbeaten in 2013 and 2015 season.

==== Rebranding (2017) ====
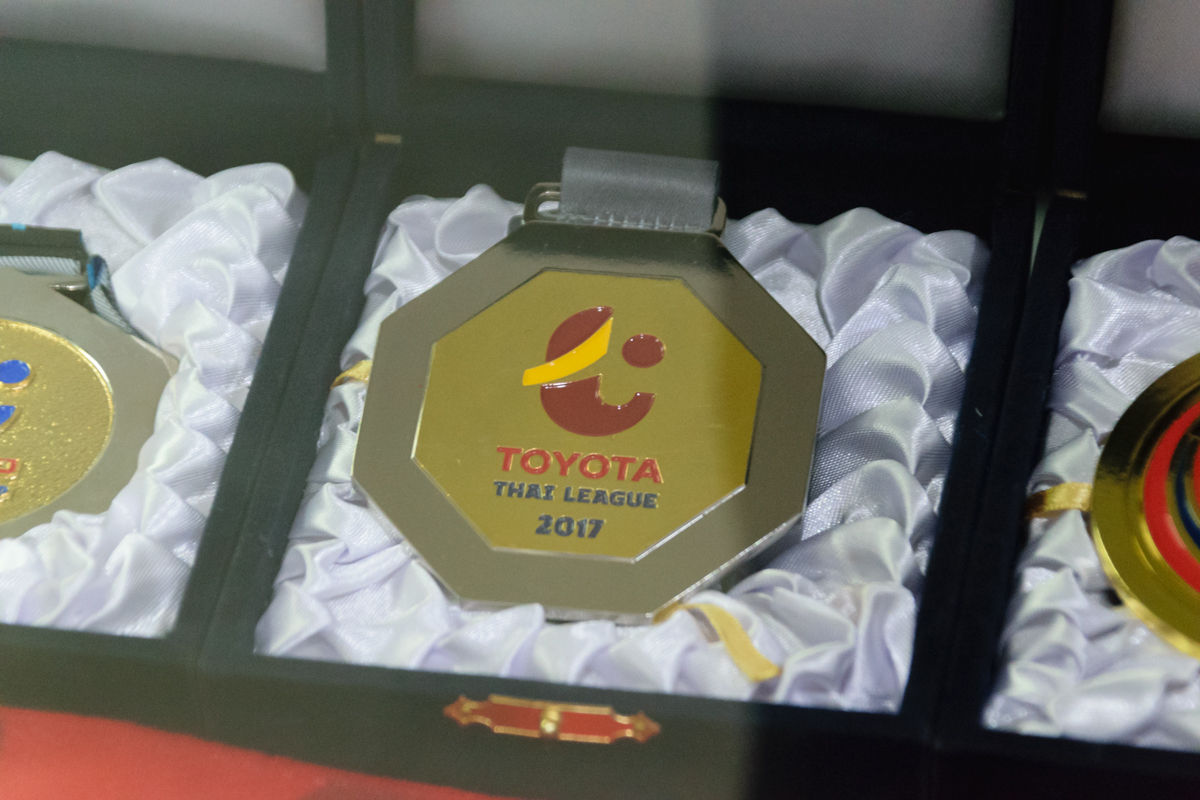
Thai League 1 logo after rebranding in 2017 in the Champions Medals

In 2017, Football Association of Thailand decided to rebrand Thai Premier League into Thai League 1. Since its inception in 1996 the Thai Premier League has relied upon local sponsorship. Re-branding initiatives seek to foster an international identity for the Thai and elevate the league globally through commitment to world-class level management and marketing which incorporates multifaceted promotion through various media to draw attention to league competition and cups. This rebranding earned the Good Design Award in the Brand Identity branch from the Japan Institute of Design Promotion.

The rebranding of the Thai League from 2017 to 2023 has been well received in terms of viewership with a large number of visitors to the stadium and watching through live broadcasts but in terms of benefits, the Thai League receives royalties for broadcasting live matches at an ever-lower value after the end of season 2022-23 Thai League is only worth 50 million baht, an amount that risks collapsing the league.

==== Thai League Revolution (2023) ====
On Tuesday, June 27, 2023, Kornwee Phrissanantakul, Acting Chief Executive Officer of Thai League Company Limited and Patis Supapong, Secretary General of the Football Association of Thailand in the Royal Patronage has called a meeting of representatives of 16 Thai League member clubs to find a solution and offer suggestions after the auction to buy Thai League licenses is not as expected. The recommendation from the majority of 16 teams is for all 16 teams to manage and find benefits among themselves (Premier League Model), which will bring information and details to the Association Executive Council meeting on Monday 3 July.

On July 18, 2023, the Thai League club meeting launched the #SAVETHAILEAGUE initiative to raise funds for Thai League clubs directly from football fans by purchasing a package to watch live broadcasts directly from your favorite team to address the issue of low Thai League values. While the #SAVETHAILEAGUE campaign has yet to increase the value of the Thai League, the overall valuation of the league remains uncertain. Ultimately, the interests of the Thai League were supported by the sponsorship of three major broadcasting platforms; TrueVisions, AIS Play, and 3BB. In 2025, the Thai League averted the problem of its declining value when Gulf Development, AIS, and Jasmine International (JAS) jointly secured the broadcasting rights, restoring the league's financial stability.

== Sponsorship ==
The Thai League has been sponsored since 1996 until 2003 and has been sponsored again since 2010. The sponsor has been able to determine the league's sponsorship name. The list below details who the sponsors have been and what they called the competition:

Period	League name	Sponsor	Brand
1996–1997	Thailand Soccer League	Johnnie Walker	Johnnie Walker Thailand Soccer League
1998–2000	Thai Premier League	Caltex	Caltex Premier League
2001–2003	Thai League	Advanced Info Service	GSM Thai League
2003–2005	Thai League	No sponsor	Thai League
2006–2008	Thailand Premier League	No sponsor	Thailand Premier League
2009	Thai Premier League	No sponsor	Thai Premier League
2010–2012	Thai Premier League	Sponsor Energy Drink	Sponsor Thai Premier League
2013–2015	Thai Premier League	Toyota	Toyota Thai Premier League
2016	Thai League	Toyota	Toyota Thai League
2017–2021	Thai League 1	Toyota	Toyota Thai League
2021–2025	Thai League 1	Toyota	Hilux Revo Thai League
2025–present	Thai League 1	BYD Auto	BYD Sealion 6 League 1

=== Match balls ===
The 2021–2028 season uses the Molten match balls.

== Clubs ==
There are 16 clubs in the league, with three promoted teams from Thai League 2 replacing the three teams that were relegated from the 2024–25 season.

Khonkaen United, Nakhon Pathom United and Nongbua Pitchaya were relegated at the end of the 2024–25 season after finishing in the bottom three places of the table. They were replaced by 2024–25 Thai League 2 champions Chonburi. They were joined by runners-up Ayutthaya United, who also got promoted back after relegated two season before, and Kanchanaburi Power, promotion plays-off winner.

=== Current clubs ===
Locations of the 2026–27 Thai League teams
Football clubs in the Bangkok Metropolitan Region

Note: Table lists in alphabetical order.

Team	Province	Stadium	Capacity
Ayutthaya United	Ayutthaya	Ayutthaya Provincial Stadium	6,000
Bangkok United	Pathum Thani (Thanyaburi)	True BG Stadium	15,114
BG Pathum United	Pathum Thani (Thanyaburi)	True BG Stadium	15,114
Buriram United	Buriram	Chang Arena	32,600
Chiangrai United	Chiang Rai	Singha Chiangrai Stadium	13,000
Chonburi	Chonburi (Mueang)	Chonburi Stadium	8,600
Lamphun Warriors	Lamphun	Lamphun Warriors Stadium	5,000
Pattani	Pattani	Rainbow Stadium	12,000
Port	Bangkok (Khlong Toei)	PAT Stadium	8,000
PT Prachuap	Prachuap Khiri Khan	Sam Ao Stadium	5,000
Rasisalai United	Sisaket	Sisaket Provincial Stadium	15,000
Ratchaburi	Ratchaburi	Dragon Solar Park	13,000
Rayong	Rayong	Rayong Provincial Stadium	7,500
Sisaket United	Sisaket	Sri Nakhon Lamduan Stadium	9,500
Sukhothai	Sukhothai	Thung Thalay Luang Stadium	9,500
Uthai Thani	Uthai Thani	Uthai Thani Provincial Stadium	5,477

== Stadiums and locations (2026–27) ==
Ayutthaya United	Bangkok United	BG Pathum United	Buriram United
Ayutthaya Provincial Stadium	True BG Stadium	True BG Stadium	Chang Arena
Capacity: 6,000	Capacity: 15,114	Capacity: 15,114	Capacity: 32,600
Chiangrai United	Chonburi	Lamphun Warriors	Pattani
Leo Chiangrai Stadium	Chonburi Stadium	Lamphun Warriors Stadium	Rainbow Stadium
Capacity: 13,000	Capacity: 8,680	Capacity: 5,000	Capacity: 12,000
Port	PT Prachuap	Rasisalai United	Ratchaburi
PAT Stadium	Sam Ao Stadium	Sisaket Provincial Stadium	Dragon Solar Park
Capacity: 8,000	Capacity: 5,000	Capacity: 15,000	Capacity: 10,000
Rayong	Sisaket United	Sukhothai	Uthai Thani
Rayong Province Stadium	Sri Nakhon Lamduan Stadium	Thung Thalay Luang Stadium	Uthai Thani Provincial Stadium
Capacity: 7,500	Capacity: 9,500	Capacity: 9,500	Capacity: 5,477

== Champions ==
#	Season	Champions	Runners-up
1	1996–97	Bangkok Bank	Stock Exchange of Thailand
2	1997	Royal Thai Air Force	Sinthana
3	1998	Sinthana	Royal Thai Air Force
4	1999	Royal Thai Air Force (2)	Port
5	2000	BEC Tero Sasana	Royal Thai Air Force
6	2001–02	BEC Tero Sasana (2)	Osotsapa
7	2002–03	Krung Thai Bank	BEC Tero Sasana
8	2003–04	Krung Thai Bank (2)	BEC Tero Sasana
9	2004–05	Tobacco Monopoly	PEA
10	2006	Bangkok University	Osotsapa
11	2007	Chonburi	Krung Thai Bank
12	2008	PEA	Chonburi
13	2009	Muangthong United	Chonburi
14	2010	Muangthong United (2)	Buriram PEA
15	2011	Buriram PEA (2)	Chonburi
16	2012	Muangthong United (3)	Chonburi
17	2013	Buriram United (3)	Muangthong United
18	2014	Buriram United (4)	Chonburi
19	2015	Buriram United (5)	Muangthong United
20	2016	Muangthong United (4)	Bangkok United
21	2017	Buriram United (6)	Muangthong United
22	2018	Buriram United (7)	Bangkok United
23	2019	Chiangrai United	Buriram United
24	2020–21	BG Pathum United	Buriram United
25	2021–22	Buriram United (8)	BG Pathum United
26	2022–23	Buriram United (9)	Bangkok United
27	2023–24	Buriram United (10)	Bangkok United
28	2024–25	Buriram United (11)	Bangkok United
29	2025–26	Buriram United (12)	Port
30	2026–27		

=== The Invincibles ===
Unbeatable champions:

- Muangthong United in 2012
- Buriram United in 2013 and 2015

=== Performances by club ===
Clubs in bold compete in the current season. Italics indicates defunct club.

Club	Champions	Runners-up	Winning seasons	Runners-up seasons
**Buriram United**	12	4	2008, 2011, 2013, 2014, 2015, 2017, 2018, 2021–22, 2022–23, 2023–24, 2024–25, 2025–26	2004–05, 2010, 2019, 2020–21
Muangthong United	4	3	2009, 2010, 2012, 2016	2013, 2015, 2017
Air Force United	2	2	1997, 1999	1998, 2000
Police Tero	2	2	2000, 2001–02	2002–03, 2003–04
Krung Thai Bank	2	1	2002–03, 2003–04	2007
**Bangkok United**	1	5	2006	2016, 2018, 2022–23, 2023–24, 2024–25
**Chonburi**	1	5	2007	2008, 2009, 2011, 2012, 2014
BBCU	1	1	1998	1997
**BG Pathum United**	1	1	2020–21	2021–22
Bangkok Bank	1	0	1996–97	
**Chiangrai United**	1	0	2019	
Thailand Tobacco Monopoly	1	0	2004–05	
**Port**	0	2		1999, 2025–26
Super Power Samut Prakan	0	2		2001–02, 2006
RBAC	0	1		1996–97

== Records ==
=== All-time top scorers ===
As of 5 June 2025

Rank	Player	Years	Goals	Apps	Ratio
1	(Brazil) Heberty Fernandes	2014–2023	159	249	0.64
2	(Thailand) **Teerasil Dangda**	2009–2017, 2019, 2021–	146	351	0.43
3	(Brazil) Cleiton Silva	2010–2019	144	193	0.73
4	(Brazil) Diogo Luis Santo	2015–2022	118	132	0.89
5	(Montenegro) Dragan Boškovic	2013–2021	118	209	0.56
6	(Brazil) Leandro Assumpcao	2011–2021	116	227	0.51
7	(Thailand) Pipob On-Mo	2006–2019	108	404	0.27
8	(Thailand) Sarayuth Chaikamdee	2001–2004, 2007–2013–2014	101	233	0.43
9	(Thailand) Teeratep Winothai	2006–2014, 2016–2022	96	206	0.47
10	(North Macedonia) Mario Gjurovski	2012–2019	93	197	0.47

Figures for active players (in bold).

=== Most appearances ===
As of 5 June 2025

Rank	Player	Position	Apps	Goals
1	(Thailand) Rangsan Viwatchaichok	MF	439	49
2	(Thailand) Siwarak Tedsungnoen	GK	433	0
3	(Thailand) Pipob On-Mo	FW	402	108
4	(Thailand) Sinthaweechai Hathairattanakool	GK	397	1
5	(Thailand) **Teerasil Dangda**	FW	351	146
6	(Thailand) Pichitphong Choeichiu	MF	340	62
7	(Thailand) Nattaporn Phanrit	DF	335	19
8	(Thailand) Narit Taweekul	GK	315	1
9	(Thailand) Apichet Puttan	DF	262	7
10	(Brazil) Heberty	FW	249	159

Figures for active players (in bold).

=== Player statistics ===
- Youngest player: Suphanat Mueanta (Buriram United) – 15 years, 8 months and 22 days (25 April 2018, Buriram United 2–1 Nakhon Ratchasima, 2018 Thai League 1)
- Oldest player: Somchai Subpherm (TOT) – 51 years, 7 months and 25 days (3 November 2013, Buriram United 2–1 TOT, 2013 Thai Premier League)
- Youngest scorer: Suphanat Mueanta (Buriram United) – 15 years, 9 months and 25 days (26 May 2018, Buriram United 5–0 Air Force Central, 2018 Thai League 1)
- Oldest scorer: Hiromichi Katano (Rayong) – 42 years, 6 months and 15 days (21 October 2024, Rayong 3–1 Nongbua Pitchaya, 2024–25 Thai League 1)
- Fastest scorer: Nirut Kamsawad (Port Authority) – 9 seconds (2001–02 Thai League)
- Most consecutive matches scored: 10 games – Diogo Luís Santo (Buriram United) (24 September 2017 – 2 March 2018, 2018 Thai League 1)
- Most consecutive unconceded matches: 8 games
  - Siwarak Tedsungnoen (Buriram United, 2011)
- All-time most clean sheets: 815 minutes – Siwarak Tedsungnoen
- Most goals in a season: 38 goals – Dragan Bošković (Bangkok United, 2017)
- Most assists in a season: 19 assists – Theerathon Bunmathan (Buriram United, 2015)
- Most titles won: 10 times – Siwarak Tedsungnoen
- Most seasons appeared: 21 seasons – Siwarak Tedsungnoen (2003/04–2024/25)
- All-time record for highest football transfer fee Thai players: 68 million baht – Chanathip Songkrasin (2023)

== Awards ==
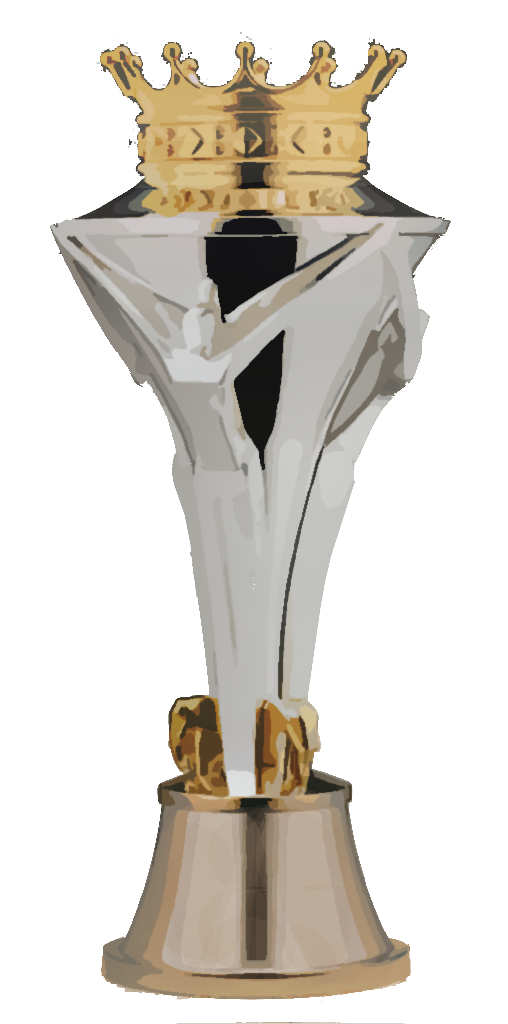
Thai League trophy from 2011 to 2016

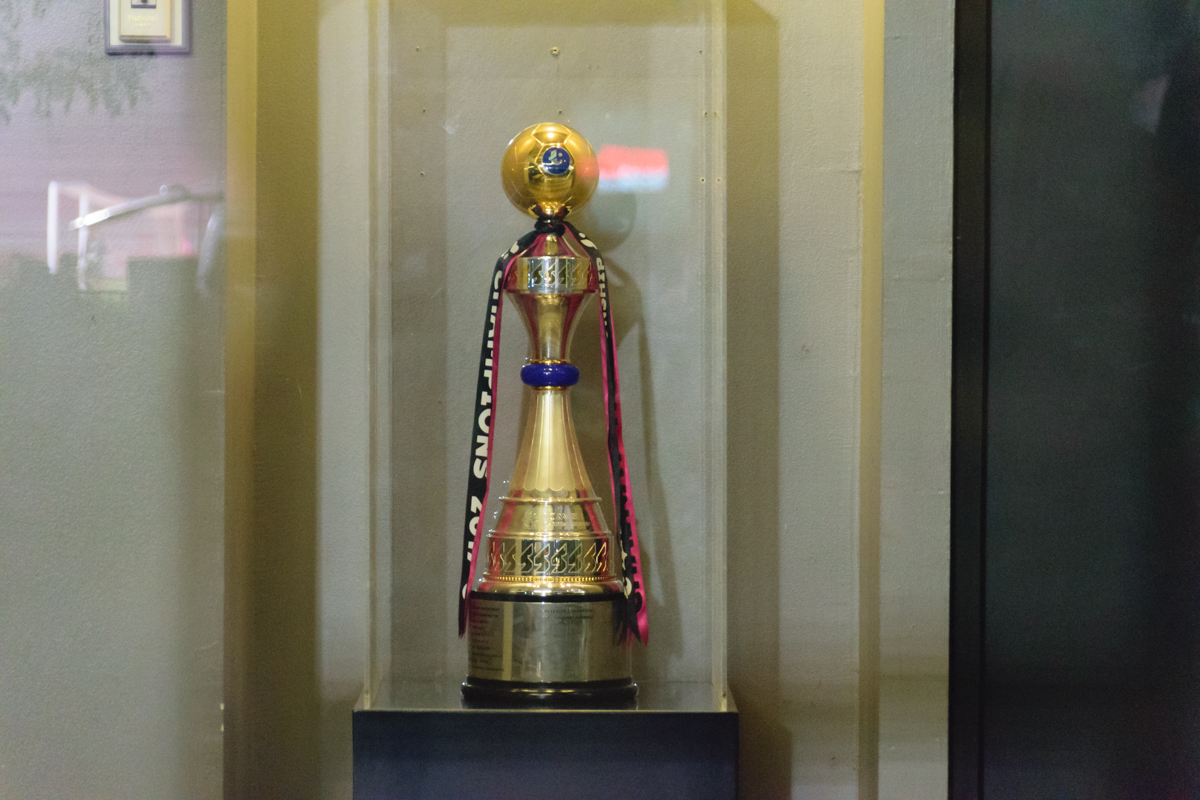
Thai League trophy from 2017 to present

=== Prize money ===
As of 2021-22 season

- Champion: 10,000,000 Baht
- Runner-up: 3,000,000
- Third place: 1,500,000
- Fourth place: 800,000
- Fifth place: 700,000
- Sixth place: 600,000
- Seventh place: 500,000
- Eighth place : 400,000

=== Trophy ===
- 2011 – 2016 trophy: In 2010, Football Association of Thailand and Thai Premier League Co. Ltd considered to improve the image of Thai Premier League Trophy. The trophy itself was designed by Glue Creative from England and produced by British Silverware of Sheffield. The trophy was crafted by silver with the European style of a crown. Three divas are holding up the trophy and three golden elephants are standing on the base. The trophy is 75 cm tall and weighs more than 30 kg. The production used 250-man hours of work and the finished trophy worth 2 million baht.
- 2017 – current trophy: In 2017, Football Association of Thailand order the trophy produced from England that was created by Royal Jewellers Asprey of London to be new champions trophy. The trophy reflecting Thai identity by the use of Kranok pattern mixed with modern pattern and sculpt it pieces by piece.

== Season award ==
=== Most Valuable Player ===
Also known as the 'Player of the Year' award.

Season	Player	Club
1996–97	(Thailand) Amporn Amparnsuwan	TOT
1997	(Thailand) Seksan Piturat	Sinthana
1998	(Thailand) Niweat Siriwong	Sinthana
2000	(Thailand) Anurak Srikerd	BEC Tero Sasana
2001–02	(Thailand) Apichad Thaveechalermdit	Bangkok Bank
2002–03	(Thailand) Cumpee Pinthakul	Bangkok Bank
2003–04	(Thailand) Pichitphong Choeichiu	Krung Thai Bank
2004–05	(Brazil) Carlinhos Bala	Thailand Tobacco Monopoly
2006	(Thailand) Punnarat Klinsukon	Bangkok University
2007	(Thailand) Pipob On-Mo	Chonburi
2008	(Thailand) Narongchai Vachiraban	Provincial Electricity Authority
2009	(Thailand) Jetsada Jitsawad (Defender) (Thailand) Kittipol Paphunga (Midfielder) (Thailand) Pipat Thonkanya (Striker)	Muangthong United; BEC Tero Sasana; Port
2010	(Thailand) Datsakorn Thonglao	Muangthong United
2011	(Thailand) Sinthaweechai Hathairattanakool	Chonburi
2012	(Thailand) Teerasil Dangda	Muangthong United
2013	(Thailand) Theerathon Bunmathan	Buriram United
2014	(Thailand) Suchao Nuchnum	Buriram United
2015	(Brazil) Diogo Luís Santo	Buriram United
2016	Not awarded	
2017	(Thailand) Jakkaphan Kaewprom	Buriram United
2018	(Thailand) Sumanya Purisai	Bangkok United
2019	(Thailand) Phitiwat Sukjitthammakul	Chiangrai United
2020–21	(Thailand) Sumanya Purisai (2)	BG Pathum United
2021–22	(Thailand) Theerathon Bunmathan (2)	Buriram United
2022–23	(Thailand) Supachai Chaided	Buriram United
2023–24	(Thailand) Supachai Chaided (2)	Buriram United
2024–25	(Thailand) Jakkaphan Kaewprom (2)	Ratchaburi
2025–26	(Thailand) Theerathon Bunmathan (3)	Buriram United

Season	Player	Club
2026–27		

=== Golden Boot ===
The Golden Boot award is awarded to the top goalscorer of Thai League 1 in that particular season.

Season	Top scorer	Club	Goals
1996–97	(Thailand) Amporn Amparnsuwan	TOT	21
1997	(Thailand) Worrawoot Srimaka	BEC Tero Sasana	17
1998	(Thailand) Ronnachai Sayomchai	Port Authority	23
1999	(Thailand) Sutee Suksomkit	Thai Farmer Bank	13
2000	(Thailand) Sutee Suksomkit (2)	Thai Farmer Bank	16
2001–02	(Thailand) Worrawoot Srimaka (Thailand) Pitipong Kuldilok	BEC Tero Sasana; Port Authority	12
2002–03	(Thailand) Sarayuth Chaikamdee	Port Authority	12
2003–04	(Thailand) Vimol Jankam	Osotsapa	14
2004–05	(Thailand) Supakit Jinajai (Thailand) Sarayuth Chaikamdee (2)	Provincial Electricity Authority; Port Authority	10
2006	(Thailand) Pipat Thonkanya	BEC Tero Sasana	12
2007	(Brazil) Ney Fabiano	Thailand Tobacco Monopoly	18
2008	(Thailand) Anon Sangsanoi	BEC Tero Sasana	20
2009	(Thailand) Anon Sangsanoi (2)	BEC Tero Sasana	18
2010	(Cameroon) Ludovick Takam	Pattaya United	17
2011	(Cameroon) Franck Ohandza	Buriram PEA	19
2012	(Thailand) Teerasil Dangda (Brazil) Cleiton Silva	Muangthong United; BEC Tero Sasana	24
2013	(Spain) Carmelo González	Buriram United	23
2014	(Brazil) Heberty	Ratchaburi	26
2015	(Brazil) Diogo Luís Santo	Buriram United	33
2016	(Brazil) Cleiton Silva	Muangthong United	27
2017	(Montenegro) Dragan Bošković	Bangkok United	38
2018	(Brazil) Diogo Luís Santo (2)	Buriram United	34
2019	(Guinea) Lonsana Doumbouya	Trat	20
2020–21	(Brazil) Barros Tardeli	Samut Prakan City	25
2021–22	(Brazil) Hamilton Soares	Nongbua Pitchaya	19
2022–23	(Thailand) Supachai Chaided	Buriram United	19
2023–24	(Thailand) Supachai Chaided (2)	Buriram United	21
2024–25	(Brazil) Guilherme Bissoli	Buriram United	25
2025–26	(Brazil) Guilherme Bissoli (2)	Buriram United	23

Season	Top scorer	Club	Goals
2026–27			

=== Coach of the Year ===
Season	Coach	Club
1996–97	(Thailand) Witthaya Laohakul	Bangkok Bank
1997	(Thailand) Piyapong Pue-on	Royal Thai Air Force
1998	(Thailand) Karoon Narksawat	Sinthana
1999	(Thailand) Piyapong Pue-on (2)	Royal Thai Air Force
2000	(Thailand) Pichai Pituwong	BEC Tero Sasana
2001–02	(Thailand) Attaphol Buspakom	BEC Tero Sasana
2002–03	(Thailand) Narong Suwannachot	Krung Thai Bank
2003–04	(Thailand) Worrawoot Dangsamer	Krung Thai Bank
2004–05	(Brazil) Jose Alves Borges	Thailand Tobacco Monopoly
2006	(Thailand) Somchai Subpherm	Bangkok University
2007	(Thailand) Jadet Meelarp	Chonburi
2008	(Thailand) Prapol Pongpanich	Provincial Electricity Authority
2009	(Thailand) Attaphol Buspakom (2)	Muangthong United
2010	(Belgium) René Desaeyere	Muangthong United
2011	(Thailand) Chalermwoot Sa-ngapol	Pattaya United
2012	(Serbia) Slaviša Jokanović	Muangthong United
2013	(Thailand) Attaphol Buspakom (3)	Bangkok Glass
2014	(Japan) Masahiro Wada	Chonburi
2015	(Brazil) Alexandre Gama	Buriram United
2016	Not awarded	
2017	(Thailand) Totchtawan Sripan	Muangthong United
2018	(Montenegro) Božidar Bandović	Buriram United
2019	(Brazil) Ailton Silva	Chiangrai United
2020–21	(Thailand) Surachai Jaturapattarapong	BG Pathum United
2021–22	(Japan) Masatada Ishii	Buriram United
2022–23	(Japan) Masatada Ishii (2)	Buriram United
2023–24	(Thailand) Totchtawan Sripan (2)	Bangkok United
2024–25	(Brazil) Osmar Loss	Buriram United
2025–26		

Season	Player	Club
2026–27		

== Competition format and ranking ==
=== Competition ===
There are 16 clubs in the Thai League. During the course of a season, which lasts from August to May, each club plays the others twice, once at their home stadium and once at that of their opponents, for a total of 30 games. Teams receive three points for a win and one point for a draw. No points are awarded for a loss. Teams are ranked by total points, then head-to-head, then goal difference, and then goals scored. At the end of each season, the club with the most points is crowned champion. If points are equal, the head-to-head, the goal difference and then goals scored determine the winner. If still equal, teams are deemed to occupy the same position. If there is a tie for the championship, for relegation, or for qualification to other competitions, a play-off match at a neutral venue decides rank. The three lowest placed teams are relegated into the Thai League 2 and the top three teams from the Thai League 2 are promoted in their place.

==== Qualification for Asian competitions ====
In the past the champions played in AFC Champions League playoffs and AFC Cup for the champions of Thai FA Cup. Due to reforms from the AFC for the AFC Champions League and AFC Cup format, there is no more a direct qualification spot for the AFC Champions League for that Thai Champion, for the time being. From 2012 Thai clubs has 1 automatic spot to the group stage and 1 playoff spot for the Thai FA Cup Winners and 1 playoff spot for the thai league runner-up. However, since 2021, Thai clubs have two group stage spots for League Champion and FA Cup winner, and two teams in play-off spots for runner-up and third in the league.

==== Ranking ====
To be used for allocating slots in the 2024–25 season.

Updated on 5 December 2024

Ranking				Member association (L: League, C: Cup, LC: League cup)	Club points								Total	2026–27 Competition		
2024–25	2023–24	Mvmt	Region	Member association (L: League, C: Cup, LC: League cup)	2016 (×0.3)	2017 (×0.4)	2018 (×0.5)	2019 (×0.6)	2021 (×0.7)	2022 (×0.8)	2023–24 (×0.9)	2024–25 (×1.0)	Total	ACL Elite	ACL Two	Challenge
1	1	—	W 1	Saudi Arabia (L, C)	9.500	18.600	10.000	26.350	20.950	19.075	27.100	17.000	102.415	3+0	1+0	0
2	2	—	E 1	Japan (L, C, LC)	10.500	21.850	13.850	21.800	17.875	20.088	21.350	15.417	95.110	3+0	1+0	0
3	3	—	E 2	South Korea (L, C)	20.750	9.950	18.350	13.600	22.750	15.800	22.350	11.500	87.720	2+1	1+0	0
4	4	—	W 2	(United Arab Emirates) United Arab Emirates (L, C)	18.000	11.350	8.100	7.633	14.400	8.083	24.000	11.233	69.299	2+1	1+0	0
5	6	▲ +1	W 3	Iran (L, C)	13.000	16.200	18.850	11.500	14.225	13.250	9.300	9.601	65.234	2+1	1+0	0
6	5	▼ –1	W 4	Qatar (L, C)	22.000	13.400	19.850	15.900	7.300	13.500	8.100	9.697	64.322	1+1	1+0	0
7	7	—	E 3	China (L, C)	14.750	24.567	16.200	17.350	0.800	0.500	11.900	9.900	54.332	2+1	1+0	0
8	8	—	E 4	Thailand (L, C, LC)	1.000	15.050	16.200	5.050	8.500	11.110	8.567	11.567	51.565	1+1	1+0	0
9	9	—	W 5	Uzbekistan (L, C)	9.750	5.050	9.400	9.000	8.960	10.057	11.250	5.833	45.321	1+0	1+0	0
10	10	—	W 6	Iraq (L, C)	9.833	8.933	8.633	8.300	3.250	7.450	7.473	6.500	37.280	1+0	1+0	0

== Youth League ==
Like the reserve league, the youth league is open to all the youth teams of all professional clubs in Thailand.

== Other tournaments ==
Domestic tournaments

- Thai FA Cup (1974–1999, 2009–present)
- Thai League Cup (1987–1994, 2010–present)
- Thailand Champions Cup (as Kor Royal Cup 1996–2016) (2017–present)

International tournaments

- AFC Champions League Elite (1967–1971, 1985–present)
- AFC Champions League Two (2004–present)
- ASEAN Club Championship (2003–2005, 2024–present)

Defunct tournaments

- Kor Royal Cup (1916–2016)
- Khǒr Royal Cup (1916–2015)
- Khor Royal Cup (1962–2015)
- Ngor Royal Cup (1962–2015)
- Toyota Premier Cup (2011–2017)
- Mekong Club Championship (2015–2017)

== See also ==
- Football records in Thailand
- List of Thai League 1 managers
- List of foreign Thai League 1 players
- List of foreign Thai League 1 managers
