= Air Force United F.C. =

Thai association football club

Air Force United แอร์ฟอร์ซ ยูไนเต็ด
- Full name: Air Force United Football Club สโมสรฟุตบอลแอร์ฟอร์ซ ยูไนเต็ด
- Nicknames: The Blue Eagles (อินทรีทัพฟ้า)
- Founded: 1937; as Royal Thai Air Force Football Club
- Dissolved: 2019 (became Uthai Thani)
- Ground: Thupatemi Stadium; Pathum Thani, Thailand
- Capacity: 25,000
- Owner: Royal Thai Air Force
Home colours	Away colours	Third colours

Air Force United Football Club (Thai: สโมสรฟุตบอลแอร์ฟอร์ซ ยูไนเต็ด) was a Thai defunct professional football club based in Lam Luk Ka, Pathum Thani province. Defunct after 2019 season, the club was renamed to Uthai Thani and was relocated to Uthai Thani province. The team formed the football section of the Royal Thai Air Force until 2019 where then the club would then formed under a new club called Royal Thai Air Force.

== History ==
Historically, Air Force United had been one of the most successful Thai football clubs. However, since the turn of the century, they hadn't achieved much success. The last silverware they won was the FA Cup back in 2001. Air Force hadn't played in the topflight of Thai football since 2004.

In 2010 Thai Division 1 League, the season started off brightly for the Airmen, and by the midway point they were strong candidates for promotion. In the second half of the season, they lost form and finished in 6th spot for the second consecutive season.

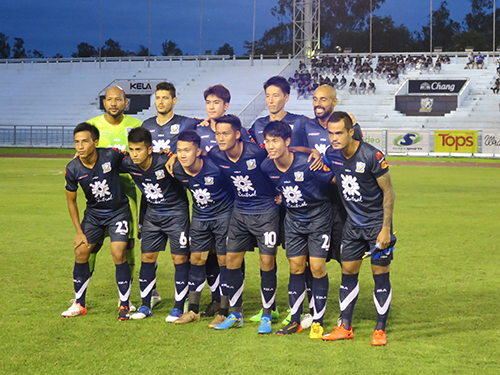
Air Force United in 2017

The 2011 & 2012 seasons both saw Air Force United flirting with relegation before they eventually finished in mid-table. The club had to relocate to Ramkhamheang University for the latter stages of the 2011 season because their stadium was flooded due to the 2011 Thailand floods. Despite returning home for the first half of the 2012 season, the club played the second leg of the campaign at North Bangkok University while their ground was being renovated.

In the 2013 season under the stewardship of club legend Narasak Boonkleng, the team started out with two 1 goal victories followed by a frustrating 4 straight goalless draws which had the making of a long tough season. But the Airmen had a nine-game winning streak with 1 goal victories, which put the Air Force United in prime position to win promotion back to the Premier League after 10 years' absence. The 2nd Leg saw them struggle a bit, but they regrouped to pull off a series of wins to gain promotion and win the league in subsequent home games.

The 2014 season start was just a total nightmare unable to win the first twelve games until the 2–1 away victory at Singhtarua. Despite showing some sign of improvement, the club management decided to part ways with head coach Narasak Boonkleng. The club's fortunes did not improve with a seven-game winless streak followed by a nine-game winless streak to end the season and relegated back to League 1 after just one season.

The 2015 season started with Sasom Pobprasert as full-time head coach, but it started poorly with one draw and two losses in the first three games. The next four games saw massive improvement with 2 wins and 1 draw pulling out of relegation and into 13th place before the Songkran (Thai New Year's) break. Another chance to show that the team had settled down was when they hosted Navy FC of Premier League in the 1st Round of the 2015 Toyota League Cup, but the team took a 1–0 lead into injury time and gave up 2 goals to be eliminated from the cup. Since being eliminated from the League Cup, the team had a 6-game unbeaten streak with 4 wins and 2 draws placing them at 3rd place in the table right before the league went on a 40-day break for the 2015 Southeast Asian Games in Singapore.

=== Renaming and relocation to Uthai Thani ===
At the end of season 2019, the club owner decided to change the club name to Uthai Thani and relocated to Uthai Thani Province.

== Stadium and locations ==
Coordinates	Location	Stadium	Capacity	Year
13°57′04″N 100°37′28″E	Pathum Thani	Thupatemi Stadium	25,000	2007–2011
14°00′22″N 100°40′23″E	Pathum Thani	North Bangkok University Stadium (Rangsit)	3,000	2012
13°57′04″N 100°37′28″E	Pathum Thani	Thupatemi Stadium	25,000	2012–2019

== Season-by-season record ==
Season	League									FA Cup	League Cup	Queen's Cup	Asia	Top scorer	
Season	Division	P	W	D	L	F	A	Pts	Pos	FA Cup	League Cup	Queen's Cup	Asia	Name	Goals
1996–97	TPL	34	14	12	8	54	48	35	7th	W	–	GR	–	—N/a	—N/a
1997	TPL	22	14	3	5	42	45	23	1st	—N/a	–	Did Not Play	R2	—N/a	—N/a
1998	TPL	22	10	10	2	40	52	31	2nd	—N/a	–	–	–	—N/a	—N/a
1999	TPL	22	11	6	5	39	43	27	1st	R2	–	—N/a	–	—N/a	—N/a
2000	TPL	22	12	5	5	41	34	19	2nd	—N/a	–	QF	R2	—N/a	—N/a
2001–02	TPL	22	8	8	6	23	21	32	4th	W	–	—N/a	R2	—N/a	—N/a
2002–03	TPL	18	7	2	9	23	26	29	5th	–	–	QF	–	—N/a	—N/a
2003–04	TPL	18	4	4	10	16	14	38	9th	–	–	Did not qualify	–	—N/a	—N/a
2005	DIV 1	—N/a	—N/a	—N/a	—N/a	—N/a	—N/a	—N/a	—N/a	–	–	–	–	—N/a	—N/a
2006	DIV 1	—N/a	—N/a	—N/a	—N/a	—N/a	—N/a	—N/a	—N/a	–	–	Did Not Play	–	—N/a	—N/a
2007	DIV 1	22	12	6	4	41	22	42	3rd	–	–	–	–	—N/a	—N/a
2008	DIV 1	30	10	10	10	40	32	40	10th	–	–	–	–	Watcharapong Channgam	9
2009	DIV 1	30	12	6	12	42	45	36	6th	R2	–	Knockout Round	–	Pornchai Ardjinda	7
2010	DIV 1	30	13	9	8	48	33	48	6th	R4	R2	GR	–	Pornchai Ardjinda	15
2011	DIV 1	34	10	10	14	36	53	40	14th	R2	R1	–	–	Kouassi Yao Hermann & Anusak Laosangthai	12
2012	DIV 1	34	12	8	14	45	45	44	9th	R2	R2	–	–	Kouassi Yao Hermann	20
2013	DIV 1	34	20	9	5	51	28	69	1st	R2	R3	–	–	Kouassi Yao Hermann	16
2014	TPL	38	6	12	20	35	63	30	19th	R3	R2	–	–	Kouassi Yao Hermann	13
2015	DIV 1	38	14	10	14	53	50	52	9th	R3	R1	–	–	Julius Oiboh	8
2016	DIV 1	26	11	9	6	44	29	42	4th	QR	R2	–	–	Valdo	12
2017	T2	32	18	8	6	61	40	62	2nd	R1	QF	–	–	Kayne Vincent	13
2018	T1	34	4	4	26	32	78	16	18th	R2	QF	–	–	Kayne Vincent	8
2019	T2	34	9	7	18	39	53	34	14th	R2	R1	–	–	Kayne Vincent	6

Champions	Runners-up	Third place	Promoted	Relegated	In Progress

- P = Played
- W = Games won
- D = Games drawn
- L = Games lost
- F = Goals for
- A = Goals against
- Pts = Points
- Pos = Final position
- N/A = No answer
- TPL = Thai Premier League
- DQ = Disqualified
- QR1 = First Qualifying Round
- QR2 = Second Qualifying Round
- QR3 = Third Qualifying Round
- QR4 = Fourth Qualifying Round
- RInt = Intermediate Round
- R1 = Round 1
- R2 = Round 2
- R3 = Round 3
- R4 = Round 4
- R5 = Round 5
- R6 = Round 6
- GR = Group stage
- QF = Quarter-finals
- SF = Semi-finals
- RU = Runners-up
- S = Shared
- W = Winners

== Performance in AFC competitions ==
Season	Competition	Round		Club	Home	Away
1988–89	Asian Club Championship	Qualifying round	(Malaysia)	Pahang	2–1	–
		Qualifying round	(Singapore)	Geylang International	9–0	–
		Qualifying round	(Indonesia)	Niac Mitra	2–1	–
		Qualifying round	(Brunei)	Bandaran	9–0	–
1997–98	Asian Cup Winners' Cup	First round	(Malaysia)	Melaka Telekom	0–0	1–2
		Second round	(Indonesia)	PSM Makassar	1–2	0–0
2000–01	Asian Club Championship	Second round	(Indonesia)	PSM Makassar	0–5	1–6
2001–02	Asian Cup Winners' Cup	Second round	(Singapore)	Home United	1–0	0–5

Notes

Royal Thai Air Force withdrew to Semi-final League round.

== Achievements ==
=== Domestic ===
==== League ====
- Thai League 1: 2 titles

1997, 1999

- Thai League 2: 1 titles

2013

- Khǒr Royal Cup (Tier 2 when contested): 16 titles

1949-51, 1961, 1962, 1964, 1965, 1967, 1973, 1977, 1982, 1985–87, 1989, 1991

- Khor Royal Cup (Tier 5 when contested): 8 titles

1966, 1970, 1971, 1983, 1985–87, 1990

- Ngor Royal Cup (tier 6 when contested): 4 titles

1966, 1984, 1986, 1988

==== Cups ====
- Queen's Cup: 3 titles

1970, 1974, 1982

- FA Cup: 1 titles

1996

- League Cup: 2 titles

1987, 1994

- Kor Royal Cup: 12 titles

1952, 1953, 1957, 1958, 1959, 1960, 1961, 1962, 1963, 1967, 1987, 1996
