= 2002–03 Thai League =

Thai Premier League
- Season: 2002–03
- Dates: 26 October 2002 – 17 May 2003
- Champions: Krung Thai Bank
- Relegated: TOT; Bangkok Christian College
- 2004 AFC Champions League: Krung Thai Bank; BEC Tero Sasana
- Top goalscorer: Sarayoot Chaikamdee (Port Authority of Thailand) (12)
- Biggest home win: BEC Tero Sasana 4-0; Bangkok Christian College; Royal Thai Air Force 6-2; Bangkok Christian College; Port Authority of Thailand 4-0 Thailand Tobacco Monopoly
- Biggest away win: Royal Thai Air Force 0-4; BEC Tero Sasana; Royal Thai Air Force 0-4; Thailand Tobacco Monopoly
- Highest scoring: Royal Thai Air Force 6-2; Bangkok Christian College; Krung Thai Bank 4-4 Bangkok Bank (8 goals)

The 2002-03 Thai Premier League had 10 teams. Two clubs would be relegated and 2 teams promoted from Thailand Division 1 League. The team that finished in 8th position would play in a relegation play-off. The official name of the league at this time was GSM Thai League.

Krung Thai Bank won their first ever Thai Premier League title and their 5th major title at the time.

== Member clubs ==
- Bangkok Bank
- Bangkok Christian College (promoted from Division 1)
- BEC Tero Sasana
- Sinthana
- Krung Thai Bank
- Osotsapa M-150
- Port Authority of Thailand
- Royal Thai Air Force
- Thailand Tobacco Monopoly
- TOT
Locations of the Thai Premier League 2002–03 teams

== Final league table ==
| Pos | Team | Pld | W | D | L | GF | GA | GD | Pts | Qualification or relegation |
|---|---|---|---|---|---|---|---|---|---|---|
| 1 | Krung Thai Bank | 18 | 10 | 6 | 2 | 29 | 15 | +14 | 36 | Champion and Qualification for the 2004 AFC Champions League |
| 2 | BEC Tero Sasana (Note: Defending champion) | 18 | 10 | 5 | 3 | 31 | 11 | +20 | 35 | Qualification for the 2004 AFC Champions League |
| 3 | Port Authority | 18 | 10 | 3 | 5 | 25 | 19 | +6 | 33 | |
| 4 | Bangkok Bank | 18 | 6 | 10 | 2 | 31 | 26 | +5 | 28 | |
| 5 | Royal Thai Air Force | 18 | 7 | 2 | 9 | 26 | 29 | −3 | 23 | |
| 6 | Osotsapa | 18 | 5 | 8 | 5 | 19 | 17 | +2 | 23 | |
| 7 | Sinthana | 18 | 4 | 10 | 4 | 21 | 23 | −2 | 22 | |
| 8 | Tobacco Monopoly | 18 | 5 | 6 | 7 | 22 | 25 | −3 | 21 | |
| 9 | TOT | 18 | 2 | 5 | 11 | 18 | 29 | −11 | 11 | Relegation spot |
| 10 | Bangkok Christian College (Note: Promoted from last season) | 18 | 2 | 3 | 13 | 16 | 44 | −28 | 9 | Relegation spot |

Source: rsssf.com
Rules for classification: 1st points; 2nd head-to-head; 3rd goal difference; 4th goals scored

== Queen's Cup ==
Osotsapa won and retained the 30th edition of the Queen's Cup. They defeated TOT 1-0 in the final.

== Asian Representation ==
- In a revamped Asian Champions League, BEC Tero Sasana would surprise the whole of Asia and bring back past glories not seen since Thai Farmers Bank in the mid 1990s and would reach the final of the Champions League where they would come runners up to UAE side Al Ain. On their way to the final BEC would claim victories over old Japanese rivals Kashima Antlers, Shanghai Shenhua of China, Daejeon Citizen of South Korea and Uzbekistan side Pakhtakor Tashkent.
- This was also the first time that two Thai clubs would enter the Champions League. Osotsapa would also take part but would find the going tough and would crash out in embarrassing circumstances in the group stage.
- BEC Tero Sasana would also take part in the newly formed 2003 ASEAN Club Championship to be held in Indonesia against the best of the rest of the ASEAN and SAFF region. Here they made the final but got beat by Indian side Kingfisher East Bengal

== Annual awards ==
=== Coach of the Year ===
- (Thailand) Narong Suwannachote - Krung Thai Bank

=== Player of the year ===
- (Thailand) Khampee Pintapol - Bangkok Bank

=== Top scorer ===
- Sarayoot Chaikamdee 12 Goals - Port Authority of Thailand

== Champions ==
The league champion was Krung Thai Bank.

| Preceded by Thai League; 2001–02 | Thai Premier League; 2002–03; Krung Thai Bank | Succeeded by Thai League; 2003–04 |
