= Police Tero F.C. =

Association football club in Bangkok, Thailand

Police Tero โปลิศ เทโร
- Full name: Police Tero Football Club สโมสรฟุตบอลโปลิศ เทโร
- Nicknames: The Fire Dragons (มังกรไฟ)
- Founded: 1992 as Sasana Witthaya School Football Team (Original); 1998 as BEC-Tero Sasana; 2018 as Police Tero (Merged with Police United)
- Ground: NT Stadium; Lak Si, Bangkok, Thailand
- Capacity: 5,000
- Owner(s): Tero Entertainment; Chakthip Chaijinda
- President: Chaitad Chaijinda
- Head coach: Daiki Higuchi
- League: Thai League 2
- 2025–26: Thai League 2, 5th of 18
- Website: www.policeterofc.com
| Home colours | Away colours | Third colours |

Police Tero Football Club (Thai: สโมสรฟุตบอลโปลิศ เทโร), formerly known as BEC-Tero Sasana, is a Thai professional football club based in Lak Si, Bangkok. The club finished runners-up in the inaugural AFC Champions League competition in 2003. BEC-Tero Sasana Football Club merged with Police United Football Club in the 2017 season and changed its official name to Police Tero Football Club in the 2018 season.

The club has won 2 Thai League 1 titles, 1 Kor Royal Cup and 1 Thai League Cup. They were also the finalist in the 2002–03 AFC Champions League campaign.

== History ==
=== Establishment of the club ===
The team was established in 1992. It was previously known as Sasana Witthaya School team and was founded by Worawi Makudi. The first football match the team entered was in Division 3 of the football royal cup in 1993. In 1994, the team played in Division 2 of the football royal cup. In 1995, the team played in Division 1 of the football royal cup and in 1996, the team entered the Thai League for the first time. It was during this year, that Mr. Worawi Makudi and Mr. Brian L. Marcar, managing director of BEC-TERO Entertainment Public Co. Ltd., joined hands and renamed the team as Tero Sasana Football Club. The team was placed in 12th position among 18 teams in the Thai League.

In 1997, Tero Sasana Football Club also played in the Thai League and this time was placed in fifth place. Later in 1998, BEC World Public Company Limited supported the Tero Sasana Football Club and changed the team's name to BEC-Tero Sasana. The team won the third place when they played the Thai League. They were also one of the eight final teams to enter the final round of the Thai FA Cup.

In 1999, the team entered the Thai League and again won third place. In the same year, they were among the final teams in the Thai FA Cup.

=== The Thai giant and the final Asian Champions League ===
In 2000, the team won its first championship award by winning the Thai League. It also received the championship award for the King's Cup.

In 2001, BEC-Tero Sasana was able to keep its championship and won the Thai Premier League for the second consecutive year. This greatly increased the fan base. In that year, the club participated in POMIS Cup in Maldives.

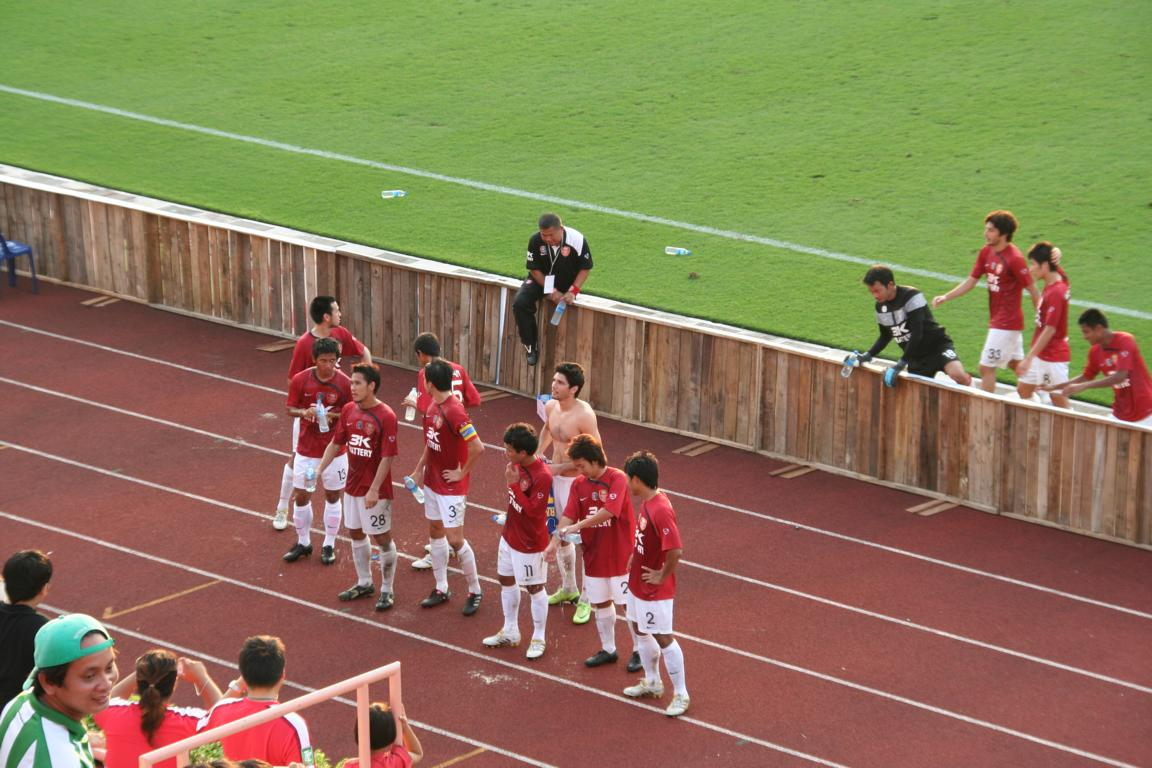
BEC Tero Sasana in 2009

The club's success continued for a few years and culminated with finishing runner-up in the 2002–03 AFC Champions League. The team were put alongside Asian heavyweights Kashima Antlers, Daejeon Citizen, and Shanghai Shenhua in Group A of the 2002–03 AFC Champions League; a group which they would top with 7 points. BEC-Tero Sansana then faced Uzbekistan's Pakhtakor in the semi-final and defeated them 3–2 on aggregate, before losing to Al Ain in the two-legged final, 2–1.

=== Golden Generation ===

BEC-Tero Sasana's starting lineup in the 2014 Thai League Cup Final

In 2012, the club appointed Robert Procureur, former general manager of Muangthong United, to be the new Director of Football and appointed Andrew Ord as the club manager. They pushed up many young players such as Adisorn Promrak, Peerapat Notchaiya, Tanaboon Kesarat, Chanathip Songkrasin, Narubadin Weerawatnodom, Tristan Do, Chenrop Samphaodi, Jaturong Pimkoon, dubbed by fans as the "Golden Generation" and the club signed former Japan national team player Daiki Iwamasa to help the team win the Thai League Cup Trophy in 2014 from Daiki Iwamasa and Georgie Welcome's goals, their first trophy in 12 years.

=== Decline and financial ruin ===
After the club was relegated in 2016 (Saraburi was out of the Thai league due to money problems so the club was placed in the place of Saraburi), club president Brian L. Marcar sold the team to Inspire Entertainment, the owner of Muangthong United. Robert Procureur quit and star players such as Peerapat Notchaiya, Tanaboon Kesarat, Chanathip Songkrasin and Tristan Do joined various clubs, such as Muangthong United.

=== Merging: BEC-Tero Sasana and Police United ===
In 2017, the club were taken over by the Royal Thai Police, who merged them with their own club, Police United. The club name change was not recognized in 2017, so in 2018, the club changed their name to Police Tero Football Club.

==== Return to the Thai League 1 ====
In October 2019, under head coach Rangsan Viwatchaichok, Police Tero were runners-up in the 2019 Thai League 2 and were promoted to the 2020 Thai League 1.

==== Failed to takeover ====
On 6 November 2023, Police Tero held a press conference to launch a new investment group, a group of three Cambodian royal princes, with an investment of ฿200 million and a 49% stake in the club. But in the end the takeover of the club was unsuccessful because the new owners were unable to declare the origin of the money and were unable to bring the money into the country.

== Stadium and locations ==
Police Tero currently resides at the NT Stadium since 2025. The stadium is available to hold up to 5,000 capacity.

| Coordinates | Location | Stadium | Year |
|---|---|---|---|
| 13°52′06″N 100°50′49″E | Nong Chok, Bangkok | Nong Chok Sport Stadium | 2007–2009 |
| 13°44′44″N 100°31′39″E | Pathum Wan, Bangkok | Thephasadin Stadium | 2010–2012 |
| 13°48′07″N 100°47′27″E | Min Buri, Bangkok | 72nd Anniversary Stadium (Min Buri) | 2013–2016 |
| 13°52′02″N 100°34′39″E | Lak Si, Bangkok | Boonyachinda Stadium | 2017–2025 |
| 13°53′03″N 100°34′37″E | Lak Si, Bangkok | NT Stadium | 2025–present |

== Season by season record ==
| Season | League | | | | | | | | | FA Cup | Queen's Cup | League Cup | Kor Royal Cup | AFC Champions League | Top scorer | |
| Season | Division | P | W | D | L | F | A | Pts | Pos | FA Cup | Queen's Cup | League Cup | Kor Royal Cup | AFC Champions League | Name | Goals |
As Tero Sasana
| 1996–97 | TPL | 34 | 9 | 14 | 11 | 37 | 44 | 41 | 12th | —N/a | – | – | – | – | —N/a | —N/a |
| 1997 | TPL | 22 | 8 | 7 | 7 | 32 | 26 | 31 | 5th | —N/a | – | – | – | – | Worrawoot Srimaka | 17 |
As BEC-Tero Sasana
| 1998 | TPL | 22 | 10 | 8 | 4 | 47 | 23 | 38 | 3rd | —N/a | – | – | – | – | —N/a | —N/a |
| 1999 | TPL | 22 | 11 | 6 | 5 | 35 | 23 | 39 | 3rd | —N/a | – | – | – | – | —N/a | —N/a |
| 2000 | TPL | 22 | 14 | 7 | 1 | 48 | 14 | 49 | 1st | —N/a | – | – | – | – | —N/a | —N/a |
| 2001–02 | TPL | 22 | 15 | 5 | 2 | 41 | 11 | 50 | 1st | —N/a | – | – | W | – | Worrawoot Srimaka | 12 |
| 2002–03 | TPL | 18 | 10 | 5 | 3 | 31 | 11 | 35 | 2nd | – | – | – | RU | RU | Worrawoot Srimaka | 10 |
| 2003–04 | TPL | 18 | 10 | 4 | 4 | 33 | 22 | 34 | 2nd | – | – | – | – | GS | —N/a | —N/a |
| 2004–05 | TPL | 18 | 6 | 7 | 5 | 19 | 18 | 25 | 6th | – | – | – | RU | GS | Chakrit Buathong | 7 |
| 2006 | TPL | 22 | 9 | 9 | 4 | 32 | 14 | 36 | 3rd | – | GS | – | – | – | Pipat Thonkanya | 12 |
| 2007 | TPL | 30 | 14 | 9 | 7 | 47 | 29 | 51 | 3rd | – | – | – | – | – | Anon Sangsanoi | 13 |
| 2008 | TPL | 30 | 16 | 7 | 7 | 50 | 31 | 55 | 3rd | – | – | – | – | – | Anon Sangsanoi | 20 |
| 2009 | TPL | 30 | 15 | 6 | 9 | 53 | 34 | 51 | 4th | RU | RU | – | – | – | Anon Sangsanoi | 18 |
| 2010 | TPL | 30 | 9 | 8 | 13 | 39 | 42 | 35 | 9th | R4 | QF | R2 | – | – | Anon Sangsanoi | 14 |
| 2011 | TPL | 30 | 13 | 6 | 15 | 39 | 35 | 45 | 8th | QF | – | QF | – | – | Ronnachai Rangsiyo | 15 |
| 2012 | TPL | 34 | 16 | 9 | 9 | 53 | 43 | 57 | 3rd | QF | – | QF | – | – | Cleiton Silva | 24 |
| 2013 | TPL | 32 | 13 | 9 | 10 | 56 | 49 | 48 | 7th | R4 | – | R2 | – | – | Cleiton Silva | 20 |
| 2014 | TPL | 38 | 18 | 14 | 6 | 66 | 41 | 68 | 3rd | R3 | – | W | – | – | Sho Shimoji | 17 |
| 2015 | TPL | 34 | 7 | 14 | 13 | 42 | 51 | 35 | 16th | R2 | – | R3 | – | – | Adisak Kraisorn | 10 |
| 2016 | TL | 30 | 12 | 5 | 13 | 42 | 52 | 41 | 9th | R2 | – | R3 | – | – | Sivakorn Tiatrakul | 9 |
As Police Tero
| 2017 | T1 | 34 | 10 | 9 | 15 | 42 | 57 | 39 | 14th | R3 | – | SF | – | – | Michaël N'dri | 15 |
| 2018 | T1 | 34 | 10 | 6 | 18 | 53 | 66 | 36 | 15th | R3 | – | R2 | – | – | Michaël N'dri | 16 |
| 2019 | T2 | 34 | 19 | 8 | 7 | 64 | 31 | 65 | 2nd | R3 | – | QF | – | – | Greg Houla | 11 |
| 2020–21 | T1 | 30 | 10 | 6 | 14 | 32 | 50 | 36 | 11th | R2 | – | – | – | – | Dragan Bošković | 5 |
| 2021–22 | T1 | 30 | 8 | 13 | 9 | 33 | 39 | 37 | 11th | SF | – | R2 | – | – | Janepob Phokhi; Evandro Paulista | 6 |
| 2022–23 | T1 | 30 | 11 | 10 | 9 | 41 | 43 | 43 | 7th | SF | – | R1 | – | – | Jeong Woo-geun; Marc Landry Babo | 7 |
| 2023–24 | T1 | 30 | 7 | 7 | 16 | 38 | 67 | 28 | 15th | R1 | – | R1 | – | – | Jeong Woo-geun | 10 |
| 2024–25 | T2 | 32 | 11 | 7 | 14 | 39 | 48 | 40 | 11th | QR | – | R1 | – | – | Fernando Viana | 9 |
| 2025–26 | T2 | 34 | 15 | 8 | 11 | 50 | 44 | 53 | 5th | R2 | – | QPR | – | – | Wellington Smith | 10 |

| Champions | Runners-up | Third place | Promoted | Relegated |

- P = Played
- W = Games won
- D = Games drawn
- L = Games lost
- F = Goals for
- A = Goals against
- Pts = Points
- Pos = Final position
- N/A = No answer
- T1 = Thai League 1
- T2 = Thai League 2
- QR = Qualifying Round
- QR1 = First Qualifying Round
- QR2 = Second Qualifying Round
- QR3 = Third Qualifying Round
- QR4 = Fourth Qualifying Round
- QPR = Qualification Play-off Round
- RInt = Intermediate Round
- R1 = Round 1
- R2 = Round 2
- R3 = Round 3
- R4 = Round 4
- R5 = Round 5
- R6 = Round 6
- GS = Group stage
- QF = Quarter-finals
- SF = Semi-finals
- RU = Runners-up
- S = Shared
- W = Winners

== Continental record ==
| Season | Competition | Round | Club | Home | Away | Aggregate |
|---|---|---|---|---|---|---|
| 1998–99 | Asian Club Championship | First round | (Nepal) Three Star Club | 6–1 | | |
| 1998–99 | Asian Club Championship | Second round | (China) Dalian Wanda | 1–0 | 3–0 | 1–3 |
| 2000–01 | Asian Cup Winners' Cup | First round | (Pakistan) KRL | 1–1 | 0–6 | 7–1 |
| 2000–01 | Asian Cup Winners' Cup | Second round | (Indonesia) Pupuk Kaltim | 4–1 | 0–1 | 5–1 |
| 2000–01 | Asian Cup Winners' Cup | Quarter-finals | (Japan) Shimizu S-Pulse | 2–2 | 3–1 | 4–5 |
| 2001–02 | Asian Club Championship | First round | Singapore Armed Force | 3–0 | 1–5 | 8–1 |
| 2001–02 | Asian Club Championship | Second round | (Japan) Kashima Antlers | 1–0 | 3–0 | 1–3 |
| 2002–03 | AFC Champions League | Group stage | (Japan) Kashima Antlers | 2–2 | | 1st |
| 2002–03 | AFC Champions League | Group stage | (South Korea) Daejeon Citizen | 2–0 | | 1st |
| 2002–03 | AFC Champions League | Group stage | (China) Shanghai Shenhua | 2–1 | | 1st |
| 2002–03 | AFC Champions League | Semi-finals | (Uzbekistan) Pakhtakor | 3–1 | 1–0 | 3–2 |
| 2002–03 | AFC Champions League | Final | (United Arab Emirates) Al Ain | 1–0 | 2–0 | Runner-up |
| 2003 | ASEAN Club Championship | Group stage | (India) East Bengal | 1–0 | | 1st |
| 2003 | ASEAN Club Championship | Group stage | (Philippines) Philippine Army | 0–3 | | 1st |
| 2003 | ASEAN Club Championship | Quarter-finals | (Vietnam) Hoàng Anh Gia Lai | 1–2 | | |
| 2003 | ASEAN Club Championship | Semi-final | (Malaysia) Perak FA | 1–3 | | |
| 2003 | ASEAN Club Championship | Final | (India) East Bengal | 3–1 | | Runner-up |
| 2004 | AFC Champions League | Group E | (China) Shanghai Shenhua | 4–1 | 1–0 | 4th |
| 2004 | AFC Champions League | Group E | (Japan) Júbilo Iwata | 2–3 | 3–0 | 4th |
| 2004 | AFC Champions League | Group E | (South Korea) Jeonbuk Hyundai Motors | 0–4 | 4–0 | 4th |
| 2005 | AFC Champions League | Group F | (Indonesia) PSM Makassar | 0–1 | 2–2 | 4th |
| 2005 | AFC Champions League | Group F | (China) Shandong Luneng Taishan | 0–4 | 1–0 | 4th |
| 2005 | AFC Champions League | Group F | (Japan) Yokohama F. Marinos | 1–2 | 2–0 | 4th |

== Players ==
=== First team squad ===
As of 30 August 2026

Note: Flags indicate national team as defined under FIFA eligibility rules; some limited exceptions apply. Players may hold more than one non-FIFA nationality.

| No. | Pos. | Nation | Player |
|---|---|---|---|
| 1 | GK | THA | Rattanai Songsangchan |
| 3 | DF | BRA | Jeferson de Sousa Ferreira |
| 5 | DF | THA | Kitphom Bunsan |
| 6 | MF | THA | Sattawas Leela |
| 7 | FW | BRA | Valdo (Captain) |
| 9 | FW | TLS | Pedro Henrique |
| 10 | FW | THA | Siam Yapp |
| 11 | MF | JPN | Kei Sano |

| No. | Pos. | Nation | Player |
|---|---|---|---|
| 18 | GK | THA | Anipong Kijkam |
| 20 | DF | THA | Woraphop Pongsuwan |
| 24 | MF | THA | Patcharapol Intanee |
| 27 | MF | THA | Apichon Kraiyawong |
| 40 | FW | THA | Thanakrit Thondee |
| 58 | DF | THA | Sphon Noiwong |
| 66 | MF | THA | Jirattikan Vapilai |
| 99 | GK | THA | Suriya Mahasarn |

=== Out on loan ===
Note: Flags indicate national team as defined under FIFA eligibility rules; some limited exceptions apply. Players may hold more than one non-FIFA nationality.

| No. | Pos. | Nation | Player |
|---|---|---|---|
| 22 | MF | THA | Detchrit Chotichutipisal (at (Thailand) Samut Songkhram City) |
| 70 | FW | BRA | Washington Brandão (at (Thailand) Prime Bangkok) |

=== Former players ===
For details on former players, see Category:Police Tero F.C. players.

== Managerial history ==
Head coaches by years (1996/97-present)

| Name | Nat | Year | Honours |
|---|---|---|---|
| Bruce Campbell | (England) | 1996–97 | |
| Pongphan Wongsuwan | (Thailand) | 1997 | |
| Vorawan Chitavanich | (Thailand) | 1998–99 | |
| Jason Withe | (England) | 1999–00 | Thailand Premier League 2000; 2000 Thai FA Cup |
| Pichai Pituwong | (Thailand) | 2001–02 | |
| Attaphol Buspakom | (Thailand) | 2002–04 | Runner-up AFC Champions League 2002–03; Runner-up ASEAN Club Championship 2003; Runner-up Thailand Premier League 2002–03; Runner-up Thailand Premier League 2003–04 |
| Sasom Pobprasert | (Thailand) | 2004–05 | |
| Dave Booth | (England) | 2006 | |
| Regis Laguesse | (France) | 2007 | |
| Christophe Larrouilh | (France) | 2008 – June 2009 | Runner-up 2009 Queen's Cup |
| Totchtawan Sripan | (Thailand) | June 2009 – July 2010 | TSW Pegasus Cup winner Runner-up 2009 Thai FA Cup |
| Jorge Enrique Amaya | (Chile) | July 2010 – October 2010 | |
| Peter Butler | (England) | October 2010 – June 2011 | |
| Phayong Khunnaen | (Thailand) | June 2011 – December 2011 | |
| Andrew Ord | (Australia) | January 2012 – August 2012 | |
| Stéphane Demol | (Belgium) | September 2012 – 31 March 2013 | |
| René Desaeyere | (Belgium) | 31 March 2013 – 11 July 2013 | |
| Choketawee Promrut | (Thailand) | 11 July 2013 – 10 August 2013 | |
| Jose Alves Borges | (Brazil) | August 2013 – November 2014 | 2014 Thai League Cup |
| Božidar Bandović | (Montenegro) | November 2014 – May 2015 | 2015 Toyota Premier Cup |
| Kenny Shiels | (Northern Ireland) | May 2015 – August 2015 | |
| Rangsan Viwatchaichok (interim) | (Thailand) | 10 August 2015 – 27 August 2015 | |
| Manuel Cajuda | (Portugal) | August 2015 – December 2015 | |
| Rangsan Viwatchaichok (interim) | (Thailand) | 1 December 2015 – 13 December 2015 | |
| Branko Smiljanić | (Serbia) | February 2016 – May 2016 | |
| Surapong Kongthep (interim) | (Thailand) | May 2016 – December 2016 | |
| Uthai Boonmoh | (Thailand) | Feb 2017 – June 2017 | |
| Mike Mulvey | (England) | June 2017 – November 2017 | |
| Scott Cooper | (England) | January 2018 – March 2018 | |
| Rangsan Viwatchaichok (interim) | (Thailand) | March 2018 – June 2018 | |
| Totchtawan Sripan | (Thailand) | June 2018 – September 2018 | |
| Rangsan Viwatchaichok | (Thailand) | September 2018 – November 2023 | Runner-up Thai League 2 2019 |
| Worrawoot Srimaka (interim) | (Thailand) | November 2023 – February 2024 | |
| Tan Cheng Hoe | (Malaysia) | February 2024 – June 2024 | |
| Thawatchai Damrong-Ongtrakul | (Thailand) | June 2024 – November 2024 | |
| Jatuporn Pramualban (interim) | (Thailand) | November 2024 – December 2024 | |
| Kaveh Magnusson | (Sweden) | December 2024 | |
| Jose Alves Borges | (Brazil) | January 2025 – September 2025 | |
| Sinthaweechai Hathairattanakool | (Thailand) | September 2025 – October 2025 | |
| Sitthichok Tassanai (Interim) | (Thailand) | October 2025 – November 2025 | |
| Phayong Khunnaen | (Thailand) | November 2025 – March 2026 | |
| Bene Lima | (Brazil) | March 2026 – May 2026 | |
| Sitthichok Tassanai | (Thailand) | July 2026 – September 2026 | |
| Somchai Makmool | (Thailand) | Septeember 2026 – Novemeber 2026 | |
| Daiki Higuchi | (Japan) | Novemeber 2026 – present | |

== Honours ==
=== Domestic competitions ===
==== League ====
- Thai League 1
  - Winners: 2000, 2001–02
  - Runners-up: 2002–03, 2003–04
- Thai League 2
  - Runners-up: 2019

==== Cups ====
- FA Cup
  - Runners-up: 2009
- League Cup
  - Winners: 2014
- Kor Royal Cup
  - Winners: 2000
  - Runners-up: 2002, 2004
- Queen's Cup
  - Runners-up: 2009

=== International competitions ===
==== Asian ====
- AFC Champions League Elite
  - Runners-up: 2002–03

==== Asean ====
- ASEAN Club Championship
  - Runners-up: 2003

==== Friendly ====
- Bhutan King's Cup
  - Winners: 2004
