= Malaysian football clubs in Asian competitions =

Since 1967, Malaysian football clubs have actively participated in prestigious Asian association football competitions organized by the Asian Football Confederation, including the AFC Champions League, the Asian Cup Winners' Cup, and the AFC Cup.

Selangor was the first Malaysian club to participate in Asian football competitions, making their debut in the 1967 Asian Champion Club Tournament. They achieved an impressive result, finishing as runners-up after a narrow 2–1 loss to Hapoel Tel Aviv (Israel) in the final.

In 2015, Johor Darul Ta'zim made history by becoming the first Malaysian club to win the continental club championship through the AFC Cup. Their remarkable journey culminated in a 1–0 victory against Istiklol (Tajikistan) in the final, marking a significant milestone for Malaysian football on the Asian stage.

== Current Competitions ==
=== AFC Champions League Elite ===
- QS : Qualification stage, LS : League stage, R16 : Round of 16, QF : Quarterfinals, SF : Semifinals, RU : Runners-up, W : Winners

Participations
Team	Qualified	24–25
Johor Darul Ta'zim	1 time	

==== Results ====
Year	Team	Progress	Score	Opponents	Venue(s)
2024–25	Johor Darul Ta'zim	TBD in League Stage	N/A	(China) Shanghai Port, (China) Shanghai Shenhua, (South Korea) Gwangju, (South Korea) Ulsan HD, (China) Shandong Taishan, (Thailand) Buriram United, (Australia) Central Coast Mariners, (South Korea) Pohang Steelers	

=== AFC Champions League Two ===
- QS : Qualification stage, GS : Group stage, R16 : Round of 16, QF : Quarterfinals, SF : Semifinals, RU : Runners-up, W : Winners

Participations
Team	Qualified	24–25
Selangor	1 time	GS

==== Results ====
Year	Team	Progress	Score	Opponents	Venue(s)
2024–25	Selangor	3rd in Group Stage	N/A	(Thailand) Muangthong United, (Philippines) Dynamic Herbs Cebu, (South Korea) Jeonbuk Hyundai Motors	

== Past Competitions ==
=== AFC Champions League ===
- QS : Qualification stage, GS : Group stage, R16 : Round of 16, QF : Quarterfinals, SF : Semifinals, 4th : Fourth place, 3rd : Third place, RU : Runners-up, W : Winners
- 1967–1972 : Asian Champion Club Tournament
- 1985–2002 : Asian Club Championship
- 2002–2024 : AFC Champions League

Participations
Team	Qualified	1967	1969	1970	1971	1972	85–86	1986	1987	88–89	89–90	90–91	1991	92–93	93–94	94–95	1995	96–97	97–98	98–99	99–00	00–01	01–02	02–03	2004	2005	2006	2007	2008	2009	2010	2011	2012	2013	2014	2015	2016	2017	2018	2019	2020	2021	2022	23–24	24–25
Johor Darul Ta'zim (Johor F.C.)	10 times																	QS																		QS	QS	QS	QS	GS	GS	GS	R16	GS	R16
Kedah	2 times															QS																									QS				
Kuala Lumpur (Federal Territory)	2 times								GS		GS																																		
Malacca	1 time						QS																																						
Pahang	3 times									GS					QS		QS																												
Perak	3 times		GS		GS																																			QS					
PKNK F.C.	1 time													QS																															
Selangor	6 times	RU		GS				GS											QS	R16			QS																						

==== Results ====
Year	Team	Progress	Score	Opponents	Venue(s)
1967	Selangor	Runner-Up	2–1	(Israel) Hapoel Tel Aviv	Bangkok
1969	Perak	4th in Group Stage	N/A	(Israel) Maccabi Tel Aviv, (Japan) Toyo Kogyo, (Iran) Persepolis, (Hong Kong) Kowloon Motor Bus	
1970	Selangor	3rd in Group Stage	N/A	(Iran) Taj, (Lebanon) Homenetmen, (Sri Lanka) Saunders	
1971	Perak	4th in Group Stage	N/A	(Iran) Taj Tehran, (South Korea) ROK Army, (Kuwait) Al-Arabi	
1972	None entered				
1985–86	Malacca	4th in Group Stage	N/A	(Indonesia) Krama Yudha Tiga Berlian, (Thailand) Bangkok Bank, (Singapore) Tiong Bahru CSC, (Brunei) MS ABDB	
1986	Selangor	2nd in Second Round (Group Stage)	N/A	(Japan) Furukawa Electric, (Macau) Hap Kuan	
1987	Federal Territory	2nd in Second Round (Group Stage)	N/A	(Japan) Yomiuri, (Kuwait) Kazma, (China) August 1	
1988–89	Pahang	5th in Second Round (Group Stage)	N/A	(Qatar) Al-Sadd, (Saudi Arabia) Al-Ettifaq, (North Korea) April 25, (Bangladesh) Mohammedan	
1989–90	Kuala Lumpur	2th in Group Stage	N/A	(Japan) Nissan Yokohama, (Oman) Fanja	
1990–91	None entered				
1991	None entered				
1992–93	PKNK	1st Qualifying Round	2–6	(Brunei) Kota Ranger	1–1 (first match); 1–4 (second match)
1993–94	Pahang	Preliminary Round	w/o	(Thailand) Thai Farmers Bank	Withdrew
1994–95	Kedah	First Round	4–10	(South Korea) Ilhwa Chunma	3–5 (first match); 1–5 (second match)
1995	Pahang	Second Round	2–5	(South Korea) Ilhwa Chunma	2–3 (first match); 0–2 (second match)
1996–97	Johor FC	Second Round	1–3	(Japan) Yokohama Marinos	0–2 (first match); 1–1 (second match)
1997–98	Selangor	First Round	0–2	(Hong Kong) South China	0–0 (first match); 0–2 (second match)
1998–99	Selangor	Round of 16	1–10	(South Korea) Pohang Steelers	0–6 (first match); 1–4 (second match)
1999–2000	None entered				
2000–01	None entered				
2001–02	Selangor	First Round	0–7	(China) Dalian Shide	0–2 (first match); 0–5 (second match)
2002–03	None entered				
2004	None entered				
2005	None entered				
2006	None entered				
2007	None entered				
2008	None entered				
2009	None entered				
2010	None entered				
2011	None entered				
2012	None entered				
2013	None entered				
2014	None entered				
2015	Johor Darul Ta'zim	2nd Preliminary Round	0–3	(Thailand) Bangkok Glass	Leo Stadium, Pathum Thani
2016	Johor Darul Ta'zim	2nd Preliminary Round	0–0 (a.e.t.) (0–3 p)	(Thailand) Muangthong United	SCG Stadium, Nonthaburi
2017	Johor Darul Ta'zim	Play-Off Round	0–3	(Japan) Gamba Osaka	Suita City Football Stadium, Suita
2018	Johor Darul Ta'zim	2nd Preliminary Round	2–5	(Thailand) Muangthong United	Supachalasai National Stadium, Bangkok
2019	Perak	Play-Off Round	1–5	(South Korea) Ulsan Hyundai	Ulsan Munsu Football Stadium, Ulsan
2019	Johor Darul Ta'zim	4th in Group Stage	N/A	(China) Shandong Luneng, (Japan) Kashima Antlers, (South Korea) Gyeongnam	
2020	Kedah	Play-Off Round	1–4	(South Korea) FC Seoul	Seoul World Cup Stadium, Seoul
2020	Johor Darul Ta'zim	4th in Group Stage	w/o (Note: Johor Darul Ta'zim were unable to travel to Qatar to play the final four matches of the group stage due to the COVID-19 pandemic travel restrictions after they were denied permission to travel by the Malaysian government. They were considered to have withdrawn from the competition, and all previous matches played by them shall be considered "null and void" and would not be considered in determining the final group rankings.)	(Japan) Vissel Kobe, (South Korea) Suwon Samsung Bluewings, (China) Guangzhou Evergrande	
2021	Johor Darul Ta'zim	3rd in Group Stage	N/A	(Japan) Nagoya Grampus, (South Korea) Pohang Steelers, (Thailand) Ratchaburi Mitr Phol	
2022	Johor Darul Ta'zim	Round of 16	0–5	(Japan) Urawa Red Diamonds	Saitama Stadium 2002, Saitama
2023–24	Johor Darul Ta'zim	3rd in Group Stage	N/A	(Japan) Kawasaki Frontale, (South Korea) Ulsan Hyundai, (Thailand) BG Pathum United	
2024–25	Johor Darul Ta'zim	Round of 16	0–1	(Thailand) Buriram United	Chang Arena, Buriram

=== Asian Cup Winners' Cup ===
- R1 : First round, R2 : Second round, QF : Quarter-finals, SF : Semi-finals, RU : Runners-up, W : Winners

Participations
Team	Qualified	90–91	91–92	92–93	93–94	94–95	1995	96–97	97–98	98–99	99–00	00–01	01–02
Kuala Lumpur	1 time					QF							
Pahang	1 time							R1					
Sabah	1 time						R2						
Sarawak	2 times				R1					QF			
Telekom Melaka	1 time								R1				

==== Results ====
Year	Team	Progress	Score	Opponents	Venue(s)
1990–91	None entered				
1991–92	None entered				
1992–93	None entered				
1993–94	Sarawak	First Round	w/o	(Vietnam) Cảng Sài Gòn	Withdrew
1994–95	Kuala Lumpur	Quarter-Finalist	3–5	Telephone Org. Thailand	1–2 in first match 2–3 in second match
1995	Sabah	Second Round	1–7	(Japan) Bellmare Hiratsuka	1–2 in first match 0–5 in second match
1996–97	Pahang	First Round	1–5	(Indonesia) Mastrans Bandung Raya	0–1 in first match 1–4 in second match
1997–98	Melaka Telekom	First Round	1–2	(Thailand) Royal Thai Air Force	0–0 in first match 1–2 in second match
1998–99	Sarawak	Quarter-Finalist	2–14	(Japan) Kashima Antlers	2–4 in first match 0–10 in second match
1999–2000	None entered				
2000–01	None entered				
2001–02	None entered				

=== AFC Cup ===
- GS : Group stage, ASF : ASEAN Semi-finals, R16 : Round of 16, AF : ASEAN Final, QF : Quarter-finals, IZSF : Inter-zone Semi-finals, SF : Semi-finals, IZF : Inter-zone Final, RU : Runners-up, W : Winners, X : Cancelled

Participations
Team	Qualified	2004	2005	2006	2007	2008	2009	2010	2011	2012	2013	2014	2015	2016	2017	2018	2019	2020	2021	2022	23–24
FELDA United	1 time														GS						
Johor Darul Ta'zim F.C.	5 times						GS						W	SF	ASF	GS					
Kedah Darul Aman	3 times					QF	R16												X (Note: The AFC decided to cancel all matches of the ASEAN Zone, including the group stage match, due to COVID-19 pandemic travel restrictions after they were denied permission to travel by most ASEAN governments.)	ASF	
Kelantan	3 times									QF	R16	GS									
Kuala Lumpur City	1 time																			RU	
Negeri Sembilan	2 times	GS			GS																
Pahang	3 times		GS		GS								QF								
Perak	2 times	QF	GS																		
Perlis	1 time			GS																	
Sabah	1 time																				ASF
Selangor	5 times			QF				GS			R16	GS		GS							
Terengganu	2 times									R16									X		GS

==== Results ====
Year	Team	Progress	Score	Opponents	Venue(s)
2004	Perak	Quarter-Finalist	3–5	(Singapore) Geylang United	1–2 at Perak Stadium, Ipoh; 2–3 at Tampines Stadium, Singapore
2004	Negeri Sembilan	3rd in Group Stage	N/A	(India) East Bengal, (Singapore) Geylang United, (Maldives) Island	
2005	Perak	4th in Group Stage	N/A	(Hong Kong) Sun Hei, (Singapore) Tampines Rovers, (Maldives) Club Valencia	
2005	Pahang	3rd in Group Stage	N/A	(Singapore) Home United, (Maldives) New Radiant, (Hong Kong) Happy Valley	
2006	Perlis	2nd in Group Stage	N/A	(Hong Kong) Sun Hei, (Singapore) Home United, (Maldives) New Radiant	
2006	Selangor	Quarter-Finalist	0–1	(Lebanon) Al-Nejmeh	0–1 at Shah Alam Stadium, Shah Alam; 0–0 at Beirut Sports City Stadium, Beirut
2007	Negeri Sembilan	2nd in Group Stage	N/A	(Hong Kong) Sun Hei, (Maldives) Victory SC, (Maldives) Club Valencia	
2007	Pahang	4th in Group Stage	N/A	(Singapore) Tampines Rovers, (India) Mohun Bagan, (Thailand) Osotspa	
2008	Perak	Quarter-Finalist	0–7	(Lebanon) Safa	0–2 at Perak Stadium, Ipoh; 0–5 at Beirut Sports City Stadium, Beirut
2008	Kedah	Quarter-Finalist	1–7	(Bahrain) Al-Muharraq	0–5 at Bahrain National Stadium, Manama; 1–2 at Darul Aman Stadium, Alor Setar
2009	Johor FC	4th in Group Stage	N/A	(Hong Kong) South China, (Indonesia) PSMS Medan, (Maldives) VB	
2009	Kedah	Round of 16	2–8	(Vietnam) Bình Dương	Gò Đậu Stadium, Thủ Dầu Một
2010	Selangor	3rd in group stage	N/A	(Indonesia) Sriwijaya, (Vietnam) Bình Dương, (Maldives) Victory	
2011	None entered				
2012	Kelantan	Quarter-Finalist	2–6	(Iraq) Erbil	1–5 at Franso Hariri Stadium, Erbil; 1–1 at Sultan Mohammad IV Stadium, Kota Bharu
2012	Terengganu	Round of 16	2–3	(Malaysia) Kelantan	Sultan Mohammad IV Stadium, Kota Bharu
2013	Kelantan	Round of 16	0–2	(Hong Kong) Kitchee	Sultan Mohammad IV Stadium, Kota Bharu
2013	Selangor	Round of 16	0–2	(Maldives) New Radiant	Galolhu National Stadium, Malé
2014	Kelantan	4th in Group Stage	N/A	(Vietnam) Vissai Ninh Bình, (Myanmar) Yangon United, (Hong Kong) South China	
2014	Selangor	3rd in Group Stage	N/A	(Vietnam) Hà Nội T&T, (Indonesia) Arema Cronus, (Maldives) Maziya	
2015	Johor Darul Ta'zim	Champion	1–0	(Tajikistan) Istiklol	Pamir Stadium, Dushanbe
2015	Pahang	Quarter-Finalist	3–5	(Tajikistan) Istiklol	0–4 at Pamir Stadium, Dushanbe; 3–1 at Darul Makmur Stadium, Kuantan
2016	Johor Darul Ta'zim	Semi-Finalist	2–4	(India) Bengaluru	1–1 at Tan Sri Dato' Haji Hassan Yunos Stadium, Johor Bahru; 1–3 at Sree Kanteerava Stadium, Bengaluru
2016	Selangor	3rd in Group Stage	N/A	(Singapore) Tampines Rovers, (Philippines) Ceres, (Bangladesh) Sheikh Jamal Dhanmondi	
2017	FELDA United	4th in Group Stage	N/A	(Vietnam) Hà Nội, (Singapore) Tampines Rovers, (Philippines) Ceres–Negros	
2017	Johor Darul Ta'zim	ASEAN Zonal Semi-Finalist	4–4 (a)	(Philippines) Ceres–Negros	3–2 at Tan Sri Dato' Haji Hassan Yunos Stadium, Johor Bahru; 1–2 at Panaad Park and Stadium, Bacolod
2018	Johor Darul Ta'zim	3rd in Group Stage	N/A	(Indonesia) Persija Jakarta, (Vietnam) Sông Lam Nghệ An, (Singapore) Tampines Rovers	
2019	None entered				
2020	Edition cancelled (Note: 2020 edition was cancelled due to the COVID-19 pandemic and the group stage is in progress 3 matches.)				
2021	Kedah Darul Aman	ASEAN Zone cancelled	N/A	(Singapore) Lion City Sailors, (Vietnam) Saigon, (Indonesia) Persipura Jayapura	
2021	Terengganu	ASEAN Zone cancelled	N/A	(Cambodia) Visakha, (Timor-Leste) Lalenok United, (Singapore) Geylang International	
2022	Kedah Darul Aman	ASEAN Zone Semi-Finalist	1–2	(Indonesia) PSM Makassar	Kapten I Wayan Dipta Stadium, Gianyar
2022	Kuala Lumpur City	Runner-Up	0–3	(Oman) Al-Seeb	Bukit Jalil National Stadium, Kuala Lumpur
2023–24	Sabah	ASEAN Zone Semi-Finalist	0–3	(Australia) Macarthur	Campbelltown Sports Stadium, Sydney
2023–24	Terengganu	2nd in Group Stage	N/A	(Australia) Central Coast Mariners, (Indonesia) Bali United, (Philippines) Stallion Laguna	

== Games by club ==
Match won	Match drawn	Match lost

=== FELDA United ===
FELDA United results
Season	Round	Result	Opponent	Venue
2017 AFC Cup	Group Stage	1–2	(Singapore) Tampines Rovers	Jalan Besar Stadium, Singapore
2017 AFC Cup	Group Stage	1–1	(Vietnam) Hà Nội	Shah Alam Stadium, Shah Alam
2017 AFC Cup	Group Stage	0–0	(Philippines) Ceres–Negros	Panaad Park and Stadium, Bacolod
2017 AFC Cup	Group Stage	3–0	(Philippines) Ceres–Negros	Shah Alam Stadium, Shah Alam
2017 AFC Cup	Group Stage	1–3	(Singapore) Tampines Rovers	Tun Abdul Razak Stadium, Jengka
2017 AFC Cup	Group Stage	1–4	(Vietnam) Hà Nội	Mỹ Đình National Stadium, Hanoi

=== Johor Darul Ta'zim ===
Johor Darul Ta'zim results
Season	Round	Result	Opponent	Venue
1996–97 Asian Club Championship	First Round	0–1	(Vietnam) Công an Thành phố Hồ Chí Minh	Cộng Hoà Stadium, Hồ Chí Minh City
1996–97 Asian Club Championship	First Round	1–1	(Vietnam) Công an Thành phố Hồ Chí Minh	Tan Sri Dato' Haji Hassan Yunos Stadium, Johor Bahru
2009 AFC Cup	Group stage	0–0	(Maldives) VB	Pasir Gudang Corporation Stadium, Pasir Gudang
2009 AFC Cup	Group stage	1–3	(Indonesia) PSMS Medan	Jakabaring Stadium, Palembang
2009 AFC Cup	Group stage	0–2	(Hong Kong) South China	Mong Kok Stadium, Hong Kong
2009 AFC Cup	Group stage	1–4	(Hong Kong) South China	Pasir Gudang Corporation Stadium, Pasir Gudang
2009 AFC Cup	Group stage	0–2	(Maldives) VB	National Stadium, Malé
2009 AFC Cup	Group stage	0–1	(Indonesia) PSMS Medan	Pasir Gudang Corporation Stadium, Pasir Gudang
2015 AFC Champions League	Preliminary round 1	2–1 (a.e.t.)	(India) Bengaluru FC	Tan Sri Dato' Haji Hassan Yunos Stadium, Johor Bahru
2015 AFC Champions League	Preliminary round 2	0–3	(Thailand) Bangkok Glass	Leo Stadium, Pathum Thani
2015 AFC Cup	Group stage	4–1	(India) East Bengal	Tan Sri Dato' Haji Hassan Yunos Stadium, Johor Bahru
2015 AFC Cup	Group stage	1–0	(Singapore) Balestier Khalsa	Jalan Besar Stadium, Singapore
2015 AFC Cup	Group stage	0–2	(Hong Kong) Kitchee	Mong Kok Stadium, Hong Kong
2015 AFC Cup	Group stage	2–0	(Hong Kong) Kitchee	Tan Sri Dato' Haji Hassan Yunos Stadium, Johor Bahru
2015 AFC Cup	Group stage	1–0	(India) East Bengal	Salt Lake Stadium, Kolkata
2015 AFC Cup	Group stage	3–0	(Singapore) Balestier Khalsa	Tan Sri Dato' Haji Hassan Yunos Stadium, Johor Bahru
2015 AFC Cup	Round of 16	5–0	(Myanmar) Ayeyawady United	Tan Sri Dato' Haji Hassan Yunos Stadium, Johor Bahru
2015 AFC Cup	Quarter-final	1–1	(Hong Kong) South China	Tan Sri Dato' Haji Hassan Yunos Stadium, Johor Bahru
2015 AFC Cup	Quarter-final	3–1	(Hong Kong) South China	Mong Kok Stadium, Hong Kong
2015 AFC Cup	Semi-final	1–3	(Kuwait) Al-Qadsia	Al Kuwait Sports Club Stadium, Kuwait City
2015 AFC Cup	Semi-final	w/o	(Kuwait) Al-Qadsia	Tan Sri Dato' Haji Hassan Yunos Stadium, Johor Bahru
2015 AFC Cup	Final	1–0	(Tajikistan) Istiklol	Pamir Stadium, Dushanbe
2016 AFC Champions League	Preliminary round 2	0–0 (a.e.t.) (0–3 p)	(Thailand) Muangthong United	SCG Stadium, Nonthaburi
2016 AFC Cup	Group stage	8–1	(Myanmar) Ayeyawady United	Tan Sri Dato' Haji Hassan Yunos Stadium, Johor Bahru
2016 AFC Cup	Group stage	1–0	(India) Bengaluru	Sree Kanteerava Stadium, Bengaluru
2016 AFC Cup	Group stage	3–0	(Laos) Lao Toyota	Tan Sri Dato' Haji Hassan Yunos Stadium, Johor Bahru
2016 AFC Cup	Group stage	4–1	(Laos) Lao Toyota	New Laos National Stadium, Vientiane
2016 AFC Cup	Group stage	2–1	(Myanmar) Ayeyawady United	Thuwunna Stadium, Yangon
2016 AFC Cup	Group stage	3–0	(India) Bengaluru	Tan Sri Dato' Haji Hassan Yunos Stadium, Johor Bahru
2016 AFC Cup	Round of 16	7–2	(Philippines) Kaya	Tan Sri Dato' Haji Hassan Yunos Stadium, Johor Bahru
2016 AFC Cup	Quarter-final	1–1	(Hong Kong) South China	Mong Kok Stadium, Hong Kong
2016 AFC Cup	Quarter-final	2–1	(Hong Kong) South China	Tan Sri Dato' Haji Hassan Yunos Stadium, Johor Bahru
2016 AFC Cup	Semi-final	1–1	(India) Bengaluru	Tan Sri Dato' Haji Hassan Yunos Stadium, Johor Bahru
2016 AFC Cup	Semi-final	1–3	(India) Bengaluru	Sree Kanteerava Stadium, Bengaluru
2017 AFC Champions League	Preliminary round 2	1–1 (a.e.t.) (5–4 p)	(Thailand) Bangkok United	Thammasat Stadium, Pathum Thani
2017 AFC Champions League	Play-Off	0–3	(Japan) Gamba Osaka	Suita City Football Stadium, Suita
2017 AFC Cup	Group stage	3–0	(Cambodia) Boeung Ket Angkor	Tan Sri Dato' Haji Hassan Yunos Stadium, Johor Bahru
2017 AFC Cup	Group stage	1–1	(Myanmar) Magwe	Thuwunna Stadium, Yangon
2017 AFC Cup	Group stage	4–0	(Philippines) Global Cebu	Tan Sri Dato' Haji Hassan Yunos Stadium, Johor Bahru
2017 AFC Cup	Group stage	2–3	(Philippines) Global Cebu	Rizal Memorial Stadium, Manila
2017 AFC Cup	Group stage	3–0	(Cambodia) Boeung Ket Angkor	Olympic Stadium, Phnom Penh
2017 AFC Cup	Group stage	3–1	(Myanmar) Magwe	Tan Sri Dato' Haji Hassan Yunos Stadium, Johor Bahru
2017 AFC Cup	ASEAN Zone Semi-Final	3–2	(Philippines) Ceres–Negros	Tan Sri Dato' Haji Hassan Yunos Stadium, Johor Bahru
2017 AFC Cup	ASEAN Zone Semi-Final	1–2	(Philippines) Ceres–Negros	Panaad Park and Stadium, Bacolod
2018 AFC Champions League	Preliminary round 2	2–5	(Thailand) Muangthong United	Supachalasai National Stadium, Bangkok
2018 AFC Cup	Group stage	3–0	(Indonesia) Persija Jakarta	Tan Sri Dato' Haji Hassan Yunos Stadium, Johor Bahru
2018 AFC Cup	Group stage	0–2	(Vietnam) Sông Lam Nghệ An	Vinh Stadium, Vinh
2018 AFC Cup	Group stage	0–0	(Singapore) Tampines Rovers	Jalan Besar Stadium, Singapore
2018 AFC Cup	Group stage	2–1	(Singapore) Tampines Rovers	Tan Sri Dato' Haji Hassan Yunos Stadium, Johor Bahru
2018 AFC Cup	Group stage	0–4	(Indonesia) Persija Jakarta	Gelora Bung Karno Stadium, Jakarta
2018 AFC Cup	Group stage	3–2	(Vietnam) Sông Lam Nghệ An	Tan Sri Dato' Haji Hassan Yunos Stadium, Johor Bahru
2019 AFC Champions League	Group stage	0–3	(South Korea) Kashima Antlers	Kashima Soccer Stadium, Kashima
2019 AFC Champions League	Group stage	1–1	(South Korea) Gyeongnam	Tan Sri Dato' Haji Hassan Yunos Stadium, Johor Bahru
2019 AFC Champions League	Group stage	0–2	(China) Shandong Luneng	Jinan Olympic Sports Center Stadium, Jinan
2019 AFC Champions League	Group stage	0–1	(China) Shandong Luneng	Tan Sri Dato' Haji Hassan Yunos Stadium, Johor Bahru
2019 AFC Champions League	Group stage	1–0	(Japan) Kashima Antlers	Tan Sri Dato' Haji Hassan Yunos Stadium, Johor Bahru
2019 AFC Champions League	Group stage	0–2	(South Korea) Gyeongnam	Changwon Football Center, Changwon
2020 AFC Champions League	Group stage	1–5 (Voided)	(Japan) Vissel Kobe	Noevir Stadium Kobe, Kobe
2020 AFC Champions League	Group stage	2–1 (Voided)	(South Korea) Suwon Samsung Bluewings	Sultan Ibrahim Stadium, Iskandar Puteri
2020 AFC Champions League	Group stage	Cancelled	(China) Guangzhou Evergrande	Khalifa International Stadium, Doha
2020 AFC Champions League	Group stage	Cancelled	(South Korea) Suwon Samsung Bluewings	Khalifa International Stadium, Doha
2020 AFC Champions League	Group stage	Cancelled	(Japan) Vissel Kobe	Khalifa International Stadium, Doha
2020 AFC Champions League	Group stage	Cancelled	(China) Guangzhou Evergrande	Khalifa International Stadium, Doha
2021 AFC Champions League	Group stage	0–1	(Japan) Nagoya Grampus	Rajamangala Stadium, Bangkok
2021 AFC Champions League	Group stage	1–0	(Thailand) Ratchaburi Mitr Phol	Rajamangala Stadium, Bangkok
2021 AFC Champions League	Group stage	1–4	(South Korea) Pohang Steelers	Rajamangala Stadium, Bangkok
2021 AFC Champions League	Group stage	0–2	(South Korea) Pohang Steelers	Rajamangala Stadium, Bangkok
2021 AFC Champions League	Group stage	1–2	(Japan) Nagoya Grampus	Rajamangala Stadium, Bangkok
2021 AFC Champions League	Group stage	0–0	(Thailand) Ratchaburi Mitr Phol	Rajamangala Stadium, Bangkok
2022-23 AFC Champions League	Group stage	5–0	(China) Guangzhou	Sultan Ibrahim Stadium, Iskandar Puteri
2022-23 AFC Champions League	Group stage	2–1	(South Korea) Ulsan Hyundai	Sultan Ibrahim Stadium, Iskandar Puteri
2022-23 AFC Champions League	Group stage	0–0	(Japan) Kawasaki Frontale	Sultan Ibrahim Stadium, Iskandar Puteri
2022-23 AFC Champions League	Group stage	0–5	(Japan) Kawasaki Frontale	Sultan Ibrahim Stadium, Iskandar Puteri
2022-23 AFC Champions League	Group stage	2–0	(China) Guangzhou	Sultan Ibrahim Stadium, Iskandar Puteri
2022-23 AFC Champions League	Group stage	2–1	(South Korea) Ulsan Hyundai	Sultan Ibrahim Stadium, Iskandar Puteri
2022-23 AFC Champions League	Round of 16	0–5	(Japan) Urawa Red Diamonds	Saitama Stadium 2002, Saitama
2023-24 AFC Champions League	Group stage	0–1	(Japan) Kawasaki Frontale	Sultan Ibrahim Stadium, Iskandar Puteri
2023-24 AFC Champions League	Group stage	4–2	(Thailand) BG Pathum United	BG Stadium, Pathum Thani
2023-24 AFC Champions League	Group stage	1–3	(South Korea) Ulsan Hyundai	Ulsan Munsu Football Stadium, Ulsan
2023-24 AFC Champions League	Group stage	2–1	(South Korea) Ulsan Hyundai	Sultan Ibrahim Stadium, Iskandar Puteri
2023-24 AFC Champions League	Group stage	0–5	(Japan) Kawasaki Frontale	Kawasaki Todoroki Stadium, Kawasaki
2023-24 AFC Champions League	Group stage	4–1	(Thailand) BG Pathum United	Sultan Ibrahim Stadium, Iskandar Puteri
2024-25 AFC Champions League Elite	League stage	2–2	(China) Shanghai Port	Pudong Football Stadium, Shanghai
2024-25 AFC Champions League Elite	League stage	3–0	(China) Shanghai Shenhua	Sultan Ibrahim Stadium, Iskandar Puteri
2024-25 AFC Champions League Elite	League stage	1–3	(South Korea) Gwangju	Yongin Mireu Stadium, Yongin
2024-25 AFC Champions League Elite	League stage	3–0	(South Korea) Ulsan HD	Sultan Ibrahim Stadium, Iskandar Puteri
2024-25 AFC Champions League Elite	League stage	~~0–1~~	(China) Shandong Taishan	Jinan Olympic Sports Center Stadium, Jinan
2024-25 AFC Champions League Elite	League stage	0–0	(Thailand) Buriram United	Sultan Ibrahim Stadium, Iskandar Puteri
2024-25 AFC Champions League Elite	League stage	2–1	(Australia) Central Coast Mariners	Central Coast Stadium, Gosford
2024-25 AFC Champions League Elite	League stage	5–2	(South Korea) Pohang Steelers	Sultan Ibrahim Stadium, Iskandar Puteri
2024-25 AFC Champions League Elite	Round of 16	0–0	(Thailand) Buriram United	Chang Arena, Buriram
2024-25 AFC Champions League Elite	Round of 16	0–1	(Thailand) Buriram United	Sultan Ibrahim Stadium, Iskandar Puteri
2025-26 AFC Champions League Elite	League stage	1–2	(Thailand) Buriram United	Chang Arena, Buriram
2025-26 AFC Champions League Elite	League stage	0–0	(Japan) Machida Zelvia	Sultan Ibrahim Stadium, Iskandar Puteri
2025-26 AFC Champions League Elite	League stage	2–0	(China) Chengdu Rongcheng	Phoenix Hill Football Stadium, Chengdu
2025-26 AFC Champions League Elite	League stage	3–1	(China) Shanghai Shenhua	Sultan Ibrahim Stadium, Iskandar Puteri
2025-26 AFC Champions League Elite	League stage	0–2	(South Korea) Gangwon	Chuncheon Songam Sports Town, Chuncheon
2025-26 AFC Champions League Elite	League stage	0–0	(China) Shanghai Port	Sultan Ibrahim Stadium, Iskandar Puteri
2025-26 AFC Champions League Elite	League stage	1–2	(Japan) Sanfrecce Hiroshima	Edion Peace Wing Hiroshima, Hiroshima
2025-26 AFC Champions League Elite	League stage	1–0	(Japan) Vissel Kobe	Sultan Ibrahim Stadium, Iskandar Puteri
2025-26 AFC Champions League Elite	Round of 16	3–1	(Japan) Sanfrecce Hiroshima	Sultan Ibrahim Stadium, Iskandar Puteri
2025-26 AFC Champions League Elite	Round of 16	0–1	(Japan) Sanfrecce Hiroshima	Edion Peace Wing Hiroshima, Hiroshima
2025-26 AFC Champions League Elite	Quarter-Final	1–2	(Saudi Arabia) Al-Ahli Saudi	King Abdullah Sports City, Jeddah
2026–27 AFC Champions League Elite	League stage	–	(Thailand) Buriram United	Sultan Ibrahim Stadium, Iskandar Puteri
2026–27 AFC Champions League Elite	League stage	–	(South Korea) Pohang Steelers	Pohang Steel Yard, Pohang
2026–27 AFC Champions League Elite	League stage	–	(Thailand) Port	Sultan Ibrahim Stadium, Iskandar Puteri
2026–27 AFC Champions League Elite	League stage	–	(South Korea) Jeonbuk Hyundai Motors	Jeonju World Cup Stadium, Jeonju
2026–27 AFC Champions League Elite	League stage	–	(Thailand) Ratchaburi	Ratchaburi Stadium, Ratchaburi
2026–27 AFC Champions League Elite	League stage	–	(South Korea) Daejeon Hana Citizen	Sultan Ibrahim Stadium, Iskandar Puteri
2026–27 AFC Champions League Elite	League stage	–	(Australia) Newcastle Jets	McDonald Jones Stadium, Newcastle
2026–27 AFC Champions League Elite	League stage	–	(Vietnam) Cong An Hanoi	Sultan Ibrahim Stadium, Iskandar Puteri

=== Kedah Darul Aman ===
Kedah Darul Aman results
Season	Round	Result	Opponent	Venue
1994–95 Asian Club Championship	First Round	3–5	(South Korea) Ilhwa Chunma	Dongdaemun Stadium, Seoul
1994–95 Asian Club Championship	First Round	1–5	(South Korea) Ilhwa Chunma	Darul Aman Stadium, Alor Setar
2008 AFC Cup	Group Stage	1–0	(Maldives) Victory	Darul Aman Stadium, Alor Setar
2008 AFC Cup	Group Stage	1–5	(Singapore) Home United	Jalan Besar Stadium, Singapore
2008 AFC Cup	Group Stage	3–1	(Hong Kong) South China	Mong Kok Stadium, Hong Kong
2008 AFC Cup	Group Stage	3–0	(Hong Kong) South China	Darul Aman Stadium, Alor Setar
2008 AFC Cup	Group Stage	1–1	(Maldives) Victory	National Stadium, Malé
2008 AFC Cup	Group Stage	4–1	(Singapore) Home United	Darul Aman Stadium, Alor Setar
2008 AFC Cup	Quarter-Final	0–5	(Bahrain) Al-Muharraq	Bahrain National Stadium, Manama
2008 AFC Cup	Quarter-Final	1–2	(Bahrain) Al-Muharraq	Darul Aman Stadium, Alor Setar
2009 AFC Cup	Group Stage	1–3	(Vietnam) Hanoi ACB	Hàng Đẫy Stadium, Hanoi
2009 AFC Cup	Group Stage	0–1	(Thailand) Chonburi	Darul Aman Stadium, Alor Setar
2009 AFC Cup	Group Stage	2–0	(Hong Kong) Eastern	Darul Aman Stadium, Alor Setar
2009 AFC Cup	Group Stage	3–3	(Hong Kong) Eastern	Mong Kok Stadium, Hong Kong
2009 AFC Cup	Group Stage	7–0	(Vietnam) Hanoi ACB	Darul Aman Stadium, Alor Setar
2009 AFC Cup	Group Stage	1–3	(Thailand) Chonburi	Suphachalasai Stadium, Bangkok
2009 AFC Cup	Round of 16	2–8	(Vietnam) Bình Dương	Gò Đậu Stadium, Thủ Dầu Một
2020 AFC Champions League	Preliminary Round 2	5–1	(Hong Kong) Tai Po	Darul Aman Stadium, Alor Setar
2020 AFC Champions League	Play-Off	1–4	(South Korea) FC Seoul	Seoul World Cup Stadium, Seoul
2021 AFC Cup	Group Stage	Cancelled	(Indonesia) Persipura Jayapura	
2021 AFC Cup	Group Stage	Cancelled	(Vietnam) Saigon	
2021 AFC Cup	Group Stage	Cancelled	(Singapore) Lion City Sailors	
2022 AFC Cup	Group Stage	0–2	(Indonesia) Bali United	Kapten I Wayan Dipta Stadium, Gianyar
2022 AFC Cup	Group Stage	4–1	(Philippines) Kaya–Iloilo	Kapten I Wayan Dipta Stadium, Gianyar
2022 AFC Cup	Group Stage	5–1	(Cambodia) Visakha	Kapten I Wayan Dipta Stadium, Gianyar
2022 AFC Cup	ASEAN Zonal Semi-Final	1–2	(Indonesia) PSM Makassar	Kapten I Wayan Dipta Stadium, Gianyar

=== Kelantan ===
Kelantan results
Season	Round	Result	Opponent	Venue
2012 AFC Cup	Group Stage	0–0	(Vietnam) Navibank Sài Gòn	Bukit Jalil National Stadium, Kuala Lumpur
2012 AFC Cup	Group Stage	1–3	(Myanmar) Ayeyawady United	Thuwunna Stadium, Yangon
2012 AFC Cup	Group Stage	3–0	(Indonesia) Arema Malang	Sultan Mohammad IV Stadium, Kota Bharu
2012 AFC Cup	Group Stage	3–1	(Indonesia) Arema Malang	Gajayana Stadium, Malang
2012 AFC Cup	Group Stage	2–1	(Vietnam) Navibank Sài Gòn	Thống Nhất Stadium, Ho Chi Minh City
2012 AFC Cup	Group Stage	1–0	(Myanmar) Ayeyawady United	Sultan Mohammad IV Stadium, Kota Bharu
2012 AFC Cup	Round of 16	3–2	(Malaysia) Terengganu	Sultan Mohammad IV Stadium, Kota Bharu
2012 AFC Cup	Quarter-Final	1–5	(Iraq) Erbil	Franso Hariri Stadium, Erbil
2012 AFC Cup	Quarter-Final	1–1	(Iraq) Erbil	Sultan Mohammad IV Stadium, Kota Bharu
2013 AFC Cup	Group Stage	1–1	(Maldives) Maziya	Sultan Mohammad IV Stadium, Kota Bharu
2013 AFC Cup	Group Stage	3–1	(Myanmar) Ayeyawady United	Thuwunna Stadium, Yangon
2013 AFC Cup	Group Stage	5–0	(Vietnam) SHB Đà Nẵng	Sultan Mohammad IV Stadium, Kota Bharu
2013 AFC Cup	Group Stage	1–0	(Vietnam) SHB Đà Nẵng	Chi Lăng Stadium, Da Nang
2013 AFC Cup	Group Stage	1–6	(Maldives) Maziya	Galolhu National Stadium, Malé
2013 AFC Cup	Group Stage	3–1	(Myanmar) Ayeyawady United	Sultan Mohammad IV Stadium, Kota Bharu
2013 AFC Cup	Round of 16	0–2	(Hong Kong) Kitchee	Sultan Mohammad IV Stadium, Kota Bharu
2014 AFC Cup	Group Stage	3–5	(Myanmar) Yangon United	Thuwunna Stadium, Yangon
2014 AFC Cup	Group Stage	2–0	(Hong Kong) South China	Sultan Mohammad IV Stadium, Kota Bharu
2014 AFC Cup	Group Stage	2–3	(Vietnam) Vissai Ninh Bình	Sultan Mohammad IV Stadium, Kota Bharu
2014 AFC Cup	Group Stage	0–4	(Vietnam) Vissai Ninh Bình	Ninh Bình Stadium, Ninh Bình
2014 AFC Cup	Group Stage	2–3	(Myanmar) Yangon United	Galolhu National Stadium, Malé
2014 AFC Cup	Group Stage	0–4	(Hong Kong) South China	Mong Kok Stadium, Hong Kong

=== Kuala Lumpur City ===
Kuala Lumpur City results
Season	Round	Result	Opponent	Venue
1987 Asian Club Championship	Group Stage	0–0	(Singapore) Tiong Bahru CSC	Siliwangi Stadium, Bandung
1987 Asian Club Championship	Group Stage	8–1	(Brunei) Kota Ranger	Siliwangi Stadium, Bandung
1987 Asian Club Championship	Group Stage	2–0	(Indonesia) Krama Yudha Tiga Berlian	Siliwangi Stadium, Bandung
1987 Asian Club Championship	Group Stage 1	1–1	(China) August 1	Stadium Merdeka, Kuala Lumpur
1987 Asian Club Championship	Group Stage 1	1–0	(Japan) Yomiuri	Stadium Merdeka, Kuala Lumpur
1987 Asian Club Championship	Group Stage 1	1–1	(Kuwait) Kazma	Stadium Merdeka, Kuala Lumpur
1989–90 Asian Club Championship	Group Stage	6–0	(Philippines) Philippine Air Force	Cheras Football Stadium, Kuala Lumpur
1989–90 Asian Club Championship	Group Stage	7–1	(Brunei) Muara Stars	Cheras Football Stadium, Kuala Lumpur
1989–90 Asian Club Championship	Group Stage	2–1	(Indonesia) Pelita Jaya	Cheras Football Stadium, Kuala Lumpur
1989–90 Asian Club Championship	Group Stage	4–2	(Singapore) Geylang International	Cheras Football Stadium, Kuala Lumpur
1989–90 Asian Club Championship	Group Stage 1	1–2	(Japan) Nissan Yokohama	Cheras Football Stadium, Kuala Lumpur
1989–90 Asian Club Championship	Group Stage 1	2–0	(Oman) Fanja	Cheras Football Stadium, Kuala Lumpur
1994–95 Asian Cup Winners' Cup	First Round	5–1	(Brunei) MS ABDB	
1994–95 Asian Cup Winners' Cup	First Round	2–0	(Brunei) MS ABDB	
1994–95 Asian Cup Winners' Cup	Second Round	2–1	(Indonesia) Gelora Dewata	
1994–95 Asian Cup Winners' Cup	Second Round	0–2 (w/o)	(Indonesia) Gelora Dewata	
1994–95 Asian Cup Winners' Cup	Quarter-Final	1–2	Telephone Org. Thailand	
1994–95 Asian Cup Winners' Cup	Quarter-Final	2–3 (a.e.t.)	Telephone Org. Thailand	
2022 AFC Cup	Group Stage	0–0	(Indonesia) PSM Makassar	Kuala Lumpur Stadium, Kuala Lumpur
2022 AFC Cup	Group Stage	2–1	(Singapore) Tampines Rovers	Kuala Lumpur Stadium, Kuala Lumpur
2022 AFC Cup	ASEAN Zonal Semi-Final	0–0 (a.e.t.) (6–5 p)	(Vietnam) Viettel	Thống Nhất Stadium, Hồ Chí Minh City
2022 AFC Cup	ASEAN Zonal Final	5–2	(Indonesia) PSM Makassar	Kuala Lumpur Stadium, Kuala Lumpur
2022 AFC Cup	Inter-Zone Semi-Final	3–1	(India) ATK Mohun Bagan	Vivekananda Yuba Bharati Krirangan, Kolkata
2022 AFC Cup	Inter-Zone Final	0–0 (a.e.t.) (5–3 p)	(Uzbekistan) Sogdiana Jizzakh	Sogdiyona Sport Majmuasi, Jizzakh
2022 AFC Cup	Final	0–3	(Oman) Al-Seeb	Bukit Jalil National Stadium, Kuala Lumpur

=== Kuching City ===
Kuching City results
Season	Round	Result	Opponent	Venue
2026–27 AFC Champions League Two	Group Stage	TBC	(Cambodia) Phnom Penh Crown	Morodok Techo National Stadium, Phnom Penh
2026–27 AFC Champions League Two	Group Stage	TBC	(Hong Kong) Kitchee	Tan Sri Dato' Haji Hassan Yunos Stadium, Larkin
2026–27 AFC Champions League Two	Group Stage	TBC	(South Korea) Gangwon	Gangneung Stadium, Gangneung
2026–27 AFC Champions League Two	Group Stage	TBC	(South Korea) Gangwon	Tan Sri Dato' Haji Hassan Yunos Stadium, Larkin
2026–27 AFC Champions League Two	Group Stage	TBC	(Cambodia) Phnom Penh Crown	Tan Sri Dato' Haji Hassan Yunos Stadium, Larkin
2026–27 AFC Champions League Two	Group Stage	TBC	(Hong Kong) Kitchee	Mong Kok Stadium, Kowloon

=== Melaka ===
Melaka results
Season	Round	Result	Opponent	Venue
1987 Asian Club Championship	Qualifying Round	1–0	(Brunei) MS ABDB	Senayan Stadium, Jakarta
1987 Asian Club Championship	Qualifying Round	0–0	(Singapore) Tiong Bahru CSC	Senayan Stadium, Jakarta
1987 Asian Club Championship	Qualifying Round	1–5	(Thailand) Bangkok Bank	Senayan Stadium, Jakarta
1987 Asian Club Championship	Qualifying Round	0–2	(Indonesia) Krama Yudha Tiga Berlian	Senayan Stadium, Jakarta

=== Negeri Sembilan ===
Negeri Sembilan results
Season	Round	Result	Opponent	Venue
2004 AFC Cup	Group Stage	6–0	(Maldives) Island	Perak Stadium, Ipoh
2004 AFC Cup	Group Stage	2–4	(India) East Bengal	Salt Lake Stadium, Kolkata
2004 AFC Cup	Group Stage	0–1	(Singapore) Geylang United	Mong Kok Stadium, Hong Kong
2004 AFC Cup	Group Stage	1–2	(Singapore) Geylang United	Hàng Đẫy Stadium, Hanoi
2004 AFC Cup	Group Stage	0–1	(Maldives) Island	Hàng Đẫy Stadium, Hanoi
2004 AFC Cup	Group Stage	2–1	(India) East Bengal	Mong Kok Stadium, Hong Kong
2007 AFC Cup	Group Stage	0–0	(Vietnam) Hòa Phát Hà Nội	Tuanku Abdul Rahman Stadium, Paroi
2007 AFC Cup	Group Stage	2–2	(Maldives) Victory	Rasmee Dhandu Stadium, Malé
2007 AFC Cup	Group Stage	0–2	(Hong Kong) Sun Hei	Mong Kok Stadium, Hong Kong
2007 AFC Cup	Group Stage	1–0	(Hong Kong) Sun Hei	Tuanku Abdul Rahman Stadium, Paroi
2007 AFC Cup	Group Stage	0–0	(Vietnam) Hòa Phát Hà Nội	Hàng Đẫy Stadium, Hanoi
2007 AFC Cup	Group Stage	1–1	(Maldives) Victory	Tuanku Abdul Rahman Stadium, Paroi

=== Perak ===
Perak results
Season	Round	Result	Opponent	Venue
1969 Asian Champion Club Tournament	Group Stage	6–2	(Hong Kong) Kowloon Motor Bus	National Stadium, Bangkok
1969 Asian Champion Club Tournament	Group Stage	2–4	(Iran) Persepolis	National Stadium, Bangkok
1969 Asian Champion Club Tournament	Group Stage	1–1	(Israel) Maccabi Tel Aviv	National Stadium, Bangkok
1969 Asian Champion Club Tournament	Group Stage	0–2	(Japan) Toyo Kogyo	National Stadium, Bangkok
1971 Asian Champion Club Tournament	Preliminary Stage	0–1	(Israel) Maccabi Tel Aviv	National Stadium, Bangkok
1971 Asian Champion Club Tournament	Group Stage	0–3	(Kuwait) Al-Arabi	National Stadium, Bangkok
1971 Asian Champion Club Tournament	Group Stage	0–3	(South Korea) ROK Army	National Stadium, Bangkok
1971 Asian Champion Club Tournament	Group Stage	0–3	(Iran) Taj Tehran	National Stadium, Bangkok
2004 AFC Cup	Group Stage	2–0	(Maldives) Club Valencia	Perak Stadium, Ipoh
2004 AFC Cup	Group Stage	2–1	(Hong Kong) Happy Valley	Mong Kok Stadium, Hong Kong
2004 AFC Cup	Group Stage	2–2	(Singapore) Home United	Perak Stadium, Ipoh
2004 AFC Cup	Group Stage	2–2	(Singapore) Home United	Bishan Stadium, Singapore
2004 AFC Cup	Group Stage	1–0	(Maldives) Club Valencia	Rasmee Dhandu Stadium, Malé
2004 AFC Cup	Group Stage	2–1	(Hong Kong) Happy Valley	Perak Stadium, Ipoh
2004 AFC Cup	Quarter-Final	1–2	(Singapore) Geylang United	Perak Stadium, Ipoh
2004 AFC Cup	Quarter-Final	2–3	(Singapore) Geylang United	Tampines Stadium, Singapore
2005 AFC Cup	Group Stage	2–1	(Singapore) Tampines Rovers	Perak Stadium, Ipoh
2005 AFC Cup	Group Stage	1–1	(Maldives) Club Valencia	Rasmee Dhandu Stadium, Malé
2005 AFC Cup	Group Stage	0–1	(Hong Kong) Sun Hei	Perak Stadium, Ipoh
2005 AFC Cup	Group Stage	1–2	(Hong Kong) Sun Hei	Mong Kok Stadium, Hong Kong
2005 AFC Cup	Group Stage	2–4	(Singapore) Tampines Rovers	Tampines Stadium, Singapore
2005 AFC Cup	Group Stage	1–2	(Maldives) Club Valencia	Perak Stadium, Ipoh
2019 AFC Champions League	Preliminary Round 2	1–1 (a.e.t.) (6–5 p)	(Hong Kong) Kitchee	Perak Stadium, Ipoh
2019 AFC Champions League	Play-Off	1–5	(South Korea) Ulsan Hyundai	Ulsan Munsu Football Stadium, Ulsan

=== Perlis ===
Perlis results
Season	Round	Result	Opponent	Venue
2006 AFC Cup	Group Stage	2–3	(Singapore) Home United	Bishan Stadium, Singapore
2006 AFC Cup	Group Stage	6–0	(Maldives) New Radiant	Tuanku Syed Putra Stadium, Kangar
2006 AFC Cup	Group Stage	0–0	(Hong Kong) Xiangxue Sun Hei	Mong Kok Stadium, Hong Kong
2006 AFC Cup	Group Stage	1–2	(Hong Kong) Xiangxue Sun Hei	Tuanku Syed Putra Stadium, Kangar
2006 AFC Cup	Group Stage	1–0	(Singapore) Home United	Tuanku Syed Putra Stadium, Kangar
2006 AFC Cup	Group Stage	0–0	(Maldives) New Radiant	Rasmee Dhandu Stadium, Malé

=== PKNK FC ===
PKNK FC (Perbadanan Kemajuan Negeri Kedah FC) results
Season	Round	Result	Opponent	Venue
1992–93 Asian Club Championship	First Round	1–1	(Brunei) Kota Ranger	Darul Aman Stadium, Alor Setar
1992–93 Asian Club Championship	First Round	1–5	(Brunei) Kota Ranger	Hassanal Bolkiah National Stadium, Bandar Seri Begawan

=== Sabah ===
Sabah results
Season	Round	Result	Opponent	Venue
1995 Asian Cup Winners' Cup	First Round	3–0	(Vietnam) An Giang	Likas Stadium, Kota Kinabalu
1995 Asian Cup Winners' Cup	First Round	0–1	(Vietnam) An Giang	An Giang Stadium, Long Xuyên
1995 Asian Cup Winners' Cup	Second Round	1–2	(Japan) Bellmare Hiratsuka	Likas Stadium, Kota Kinabalu
1995 Asian Cup Winners' Cup	Second Round	0–5	(Japan) Bellmare Hiratsuka	Hiratsuka Stadium, Hiratsuka
2023–24 AFC Cup	Group Stage	3–1	(Singapore) Hougang United	Likas Stadium, Kota Kinabalu
2023–24 AFC Cup	Group Stage	5–0	(Indonesia) PSM Makassar	Kapten I Wayan Dipta Stadium, Gianyar
2023–24 AFC Cup	Group Stage	2–3	(Vietnam) Hải Phòng	Lạch Tray Stadium, Hải Phòng
2023–24 AFC Cup	Group Stage	4–1	(Vietnam) Hải Phòng	Likas Stadium, Kota Kinabalu
2023–24 AFC Cup	Group Stage	4–1	(Singapore) Hougang United	Jalan Besar Stadium, Singapore
2023–24 AFC Cup	Group Stage	1–3	(Indonesia) PSM Makassar	Likas Stadium, Kota Kinabalu
2023–24 AFC Cup	ASEAN Zonal Semi-Final	0–3	(Australia) Macarthur	Campbelltown Sports Stadium, Sydney

=== Sarawak ===
Sarawak results
Season	Round	Result	Opponent	Venue
1993–94 Asian Cup Winners' Cup	First Round	w/o	(Brunei) Kota Ranger	
1998–99 Asian Cup Winners' Cup	First Round	1–1	(Vietnam) Ho Chi Minh City Customs	Thống Nhất Stadium, Ho Chi Minh City
1998–99 Asian Cup Winners' Cup	First Round	1–5	(Vietnam) Ho Chi Minh City Customs	Sarawak State Stadium, Kuching
1998–99 Asian Cup Winners' Cup	Second Round	0–1	(Myanmar) Yangon City Development	Thuwunna Stadium, Yangon
1998–99 Asian Cup Winners' Cup	Second Round	0–3^{*}	(Myanmar) Yangon City Development	
1998–99 Asian Cup Winners' Cup	Quarter-Final	2–4	(Japan) Kashima Antlers	Sarawak State Stadium, Kuching
1998–99 Asian Cup Winners' Cup	Quarter-Final	0–10	(Japan) Kashima Antlers	Kashima Soccer Stadium, Kashima

^{*} Yangon City Development were unable to field a team for the second leg to player illness.

=== Selangor ===
Selangor results
Season	Round	Result	Opponent	Venue
1967 Asian Champion Club Tournament	First Round	0–0	(South Vietnam) Vietnam Customs	Thống Nhất Stadium, Ho Chi Minh City
1967 Asian Champion Club Tournament	First Round	2–1	(South Vietnam) Vietnam Customs	Merdeka Stadium, Kuala Lumpur
1967 Asian Champion Club Tournament	Second Round	1–0	(Thailand) Bangkok Bank	Merdeka Stadium, Kuala Lumpur
1967 Asian Champion Club Tournament	Second Round	0–0	(Thailand) Bangkok Bank	National Stadium, Bangkok
1967 Asian Champion Club Tournament	Semi-Final	0–0	(South Korea) Korea Tungsten Company	Hyochang Stadium, Seoul
1967 Asian Champion Club Tournament	Semi-Final	1–0	(South Korea) Korea Tungsten Company	Merdeka Stadium, Kuala Lumpur
1967 Asian Champion Club Tournament	Final	1–2	(Israel) Hapoel Tel Aviv	National Stadium, Bangkok
1970 Asian Champion Club Tournament	Group Stage	2–4	(Lebanon) Homenetmen	Amjadieh Stadium, Tehran
1970 Asian Champion Club Tournament	Group Stage	0–3	(Iran) Taj	Amjadieh Stadium, Tehran
1986 Asian Club Championship	First Round	2–0	Port Authority of Thailand	Merdeka Stadium, Kuala Lumpur
1986 Asian Club Championship	First Round	2–0	Port Authority of Thailand	Merdeka Stadium, Kuala Lumpur
1986 Asian Club Championship	Group Stage	1–2	(Japan) Furukawa Electric	Merdeka Stadium, Kuala Lumpur
1986 Asian Club Championship	Group Stage	5–0	(Macau) Hap Kuan	Merdeka Stadium, Kuala Lumpur
1997–98 Asian Club Championship	First Round	0–0	(Hong Kong) South China	Shah Alam Stadium, Shah Alam
1997–98 Asian Club Championship	First Round	0–2	(Hong Kong) South China	Mong Kok Stadium, Hong Kong
1998–99 Asian Club Championship	First Round	4–1	Singapore Armed Forces	Shah Alam Stadium, Shah Alam
1998–99 Asian Club Championship	First Round	0–1	Singapore Armed Forces	Jalan Besar Stadium, Singapore
1998–99 Asian Club Championship	Second Round	0–6	(South Korea) Pohang Steelers	Pohang Sports Complex, Pohang
1998–99 Asian Club Championship	Second Round	1–4	(South Korea) Pohang Steelers	Shah Alam Stadium, Shah Alam
2001–02 Asian Club Championship	First Round	0–2	(China) Dalian Shide	Shah Alam Stadium, Shah Alam
2001–02 Asian Club Championship	First Round	0–5	(China) Dalian Shide	Jinzhou Stadium, Dalian
2006 AFC Cup	Group Stage	1–0	(Singapore) Tampines Rovers	Bukit Jalil National Stadium, Kuala Lumpur
2006 AFC Cup	Group Stage	3–1	(Maldives) Hurriyya	Rasmee Dhandu Stadium, Malé
2006 AFC Cup	Group Stage	4–3	(Hong Kong) Happy Valley	Bukit Jalil National Stadium, Kuala Lumpur
2006 AFC Cup	Group Stage	3–2	(Hong Kong) Happy Valley	Mong Kok Stadium, Hong Kong
2006 AFC Cup	Group Stage	2–3	(Singapore) Tampines Rovers	Tampines Stadium, Singapore
2006 AFC Cup	Group Stage	1–0	(Maldives) Hurriyya	Kuala Lumpur Stadium, Kuala Lumpur
2006 AFC Cup	Quarter-Final	1–2	(Lebanon) Al-Nejmeh	Shah Alam Stadium, Shah Alam
2006 AFC Cup	Quarter-Final	2–3	(Lebanon) Al-Nejmeh	Beirut Sports City Stadium, Beirut
2010 AFC Cup	Group Stage	0–0	(Vietnam) Bình Dương	Shah Alam Stadium, Shah Alam
2010 AFC Cup	Group Stage	1–6	(Indonesia) Sriwijaya	Jakabaring Stadium, Palembang
2010 AFC Cup	Group Stage	1–2	(Maldives) Victory SC	Rasmee Dhandu Stadium, Malé
2010 AFC Cup	Group Stage	5–0	(Maldives) Victory SC	Shah Alam Stadium, Shah Alam
2010 AFC Cup	Group Stage	0–4	(Vietnam) Bình Dương	Gò Đậu Stadium, Thủ Dầu Một
2010 AFC Cup	Group Stage	0–4	(Indonesia) Sriwijaya	Shah Alam Stadium, Shah Alam
2013 AFC Cup	Group Stage	0–1	(India) East Bengal	Salt Lake Stadium, Kolkata
2013 AFC Cup	Group Stage	3–3	(Singapore) Tampines Rovers	Shah Alam Stadium, Shah Alam
2013 AFC Cup	Group Stage	1–2	(Vietnam) Sài Gòn Xuân Thành	Thống Nhất Stadium, Ho Chi Minh City
2013 AFC Cup	Group Stage	3–1	(Vietnam) Sài Gòn Xuân Thành	Shah Alam Stadium, Shah Alam
2013 AFC Cup	Group Stage	2–2	(India) East Bengal	Shah Alam Stadium, Shah Alam
2013 AFC Cup	Group Stage	3–2	(Singapore) Tampines Rovers	Jalan Besar Stadium, Singapore
2013 AFC Cup	Round of 16	0–2 (a.e.t.)	(Maldives) New Radiant	Rasmee Dhandu Stadium, Malé
2014 AFC Cup	Group Stage	1–1	(Indonesia) Arema Cronus	Selayang Municipal Council Stadium, Selayang
2014 AFC Cup	Group Stage	1–1	(Maldives) Maziya	Rasmee Dhandu Stadium, Malé
2014 AFC Cup	Group Stage	0–1	(Vietnam) Hà Nội T&T	Hàng Đẫy Stadium, Hanoi
2014 AFC Cup	Group Stage	3–1	(Vietnam) Hà Nội T&T	Shah Alam Stadium, Shah Alam
2014 AFC Cup	Group Stage	0–1	(Indonesia) Arema Cronus	Kanjuruhan Stadium, Malang
2014 AFC Cup	Group Stage	4–1	(Maldives) Maziya	Shah Alam Stadium, Shah Alam
2016 AFC Cup	Group Stage	2–2	(Philippines) Ceres	Panaad Park and Stadium, Bacolod
2016 AFC Cup	Group Stage	0–1	(Singapore) Tampines Rovers	Selayang Municipal Council Stadium, Selayang
2016 AFC Cup	Group Stage	4–3	(Bangladesh) Sheikh Jamal Dhanmondi	Bangabandhu National Stadium, Dhaka
2016 AFC Cup	Group Stage	2–1	(Bangladesh) Sheikh Jamal Dhanmondi	Selayang Municipal Council Stadium, Selayang
2016 AFC Cup	Group Stage	0–0	(Philippines) Ceres	Selayang Municipal Council Stadium, Selayang
2016 AFC Cup	Group Stage	0–1	(Singapore) Tampines Rovers	National Stadium, Singapore
2024–25 AFC Champions League Two	Group Stage	1–1	(Thailand) Muangthong United	Rajamangala Stadium, Bangkok
2024–25 AFC Champions League Two	Group Stage	1–0	(Philippines) Dynamic Herb Cebu	Petaling Jaya Stadium, Petaling Jaya
2024–25 AFC Champions League Two	Group Stage	2–1	(South Korea) Jeonbuk Hyundai Motors	Petaling Jaya Stadium, Petaling Jaya
2024–25 AFC Champions League Two	Group Stage	0–1	(South Korea) Jeonbuk Hyundai Motors	Jeonju World Cup Stadium, Jeonju
2024–25 AFC Champions League Two	Group Stage	1–2	(Thailand) Muangthong United	Petaling Jaya Stadium, Petaling Jaya
2024–25 AFC Champions League Two	Group Stage	4–0	(Philippines) Dynamic Herb Cebu	Rizal Memorial Stadium, Manila
2025–26 AFC Champions League Two	Group Stage	2-4	(Thailand) Bangkok United	Petaling Jaya Stadium, Petaling Jaya
2025–26 AFC Champions League Two	Group Stage	2-4	(Singapore) Lion City Sailors	Bishan Stadium, Singapore
2025–26 AFC Champions League Two	Group Stage	0-2	(Indonesia) Persib Bandung	Gelora Bandung Lautan Api Stadium, Bandung
2025–26 AFC Champions League Two	Group Stage	2-3	(Indonesia) Persib Bandung	Petaling Jaya Stadium, Petaling Jaya
2025–26 AFC Champions League Two	Group Stage	1-1	(Thailand) Bangkok United	True BG Stadium, Pathum Thani
2025–26 AFC Champions League Two	Group Stage	0-1	(Singapore) Lion City Sailors	Petaling Jaya Stadium, Petaling Jaya

=== Telekom Melaka ===
Telekom Melaka results
Season	Round	Result	Opponent	Venue
1997–98 Asian Cup Winners' Cup	First Round	0–0	(Thailand) Royal Thai Air Force	Hang Tuah Stadium, Malacca City
1997–98 Asian Cup Winners' Cup	First Round	1–2	(Thailand) Royal Thai Air Force	Thupatemi Stadium, Pathum Thani

=== Terengganu ===
Terengganu results
Season	Round	Result	Opponent	Venue
2012 AFC Cup	Group Stage	1–0	(Vietnam) Sông Lam Nghệ An	Vinh Stadium, Vinh
2012 AFC Cup	Group Stage	0–2	(Hong Kong) Kitchee	Sultan Ismail Nasiruddin Shah Stadium, Kuala Terengganu
2012 AFC Cup	Group Stage	1–0	(Singapore) Tampines Rovers	Jalan Besar Stadium, Singapore
2012 AFC Cup	Group Stage	0–2	(Singapore) Tampines Rovers	Sultan Ismail Nasiruddin Shah Stadium, Kuala Terengganu
2012 AFC Cup	Group Stage	6–2	(Vietnam) Sông Lam Nghệ An	Sultan Ismail Nasiruddin Shah Stadium, Kuala Terengganu
2012 AFC Cup	Group Stage	2–2	(Hong Kong) Kitchee	Tseung Kwan O Sports Ground, Hong Kong
2012 AFC Cup	Round of 16	2–3	(Malaysia) Kelantan	Sultan Mohammad IV Stadium, Kota Bharu
2021 AFC Cup	Group Stage	Cancelled	(Timor-Leste) Lalenok United	
2021 AFC Cup	Group Stage	Cancelled	(Cambodia) Visakha	
2021 AFC Cup	Group Stage	Cancelled	(Singapore) Geylang International	
2023–24 AFC Cup	Group Stage	1–0	(Australia) Central Coast Mariners	Sultan Mizan Zainal Abidin Stadium, Kuala Terengganu
2023–24 AFC Cup	Group Stage	1–1	(Indonesia) Bali United	Kapten I Wayan Dipta Stadium, Gianyar
2023–24 AFC Cup	Group Stage	2–2	(Philippines) Stallion Laguna	Sultan Mizan Zainal Abidin Stadium, Kuala Terengganu
2023–24 AFC Cup	Group Stage	3–2	(Philippines) Stallion Laguna	Biñan Football Stadium, Biñan
2023–24 AFC Cup	Group Stage	1–1	(Australia) Central Coast Mariners	Central Coast Stadium, Gosford
2023–24 AFC Cup	Group Stage	2–0	(Indonesia) Bali United	Sultan Mizan Zainal Abidin Stadium, Kuala Terengganu
