= Indonesian football clubs in Asian competitions =

Indonesian football clubs have entered Asian association football competitions organized by the Asian Football Confederation including AFC Champions League (now AFC Champions League Elite), Asian Cup Winners' Cup (now defunct), AFC Cup (now AFC Champions League Two), and AFC Challenge League. Indonesian football clubs have never participated in the competitions of the Asian Super Cup, Afro-Asian Club Championship, and AFC Women's Club Championship since 1970.

PSMS Medan is the first Indonesian club to participate in Asian football competitions, namely 1970 Asian Champion Club Tournament with the result of the fourth place after losing 1–0 to Homenetmen (Lebanon) in the match for third place.

== Current Competitions ==
=== AFC Champions League Elite ===
- QS : Qualification stage, GS : Group stage, R16 : Round of 16, QF : Quarter-finals, SF : Semi-finals, 4th : Fourth place, 3rd : Third place, RU : Runners-up, W : Winners
- 1967–1972 : Asian Champion Club Tournament
- 1985–2002 : Asian Club Championship
- 2002–2024 : AFC Champions League
- 2024–present : AFC Champions League Elite

Participations
Team	Qualified	1970	85–86	1986	1987	88–89	89–90	90–91	1991	92–93	93–94	94–95	1995	96–97	97–98	99–00	00–01	01–02	02–03	2004	2005	2007	2009	2010	2011	2012	2015	2018	2019	2020	23–24
Pelita Jaya	4 times						GS	3rd	QS			QS																			
PSM Makassar	4 times													QS			GS			GS	GS										
Krama Yudha Tiga Berlian	3 times		3rd	GS	QS																										
Arema	3 times										QS											GS			GS						
Sriwijaya	3 times																						GS	QS	QS						
Bali United	3 times																											QS		QS	QS
PSMS Medan	2 times	4th																					QS								
Persib Bandung	2 times												GS														QS				
Persebaya Surabaya	2 times														QS						GS										
Persija Jakarta	2 times																	QS											QS		
Persik Kediri	2 times																			GS		GS									
Persipura Jayapura	2 times																							GS		QS					
Niac Mitra	1 time					QS																									
Arseto	1 time									GS																					
PSIS Semarang	1 time															QS															
Petrokimia Putra	1 time																		QS												
Persita Tangerang	1 time																		QS												

==== Results ====
Season	Club	Progress	Score	Opponents	Venue(s)
1967	None entered				
1969	None entered				
1970	PSMS Medan	Fourth place	0–1	(Lebanon) Homenetmen	Amjadieh Stadium, Tehran
1971	None entered				
1972	None entered				
1985–86	Krama Yudha Tiga Berlian	Third place	1–0	(Syria) Al-Ittihad	Jeddah
1986	Krama Yudha Tiga Berlian	2nd in second round GS	N/A	Liaoning, (Hong Kong) South China	
1987	Krama Yudha Tiga Berlian	2nd in group stage	N/A	(Malaysia) Federal Territory, (Singapore) Tiong Bahru, (Brunei) Kota Ranger	
1988–89	Niac Mitra	3rd in group stage	N/A	(Thailand) Royal Thai Air Force, (Malaysia) Pahang, (Singapore) Geylang International, (Brunei) Bandaran	
1989–90	Pelita Jaya	4th in group stage	N/A	(China) Liaoning, (Iraq) Al Rasheed, (Iran) Shahin Ahvaz	
1990–91	Pelita Jaya	Third place	2–2 (7–6 p)	(North Korea) April 25	Dhaka
1991	Pelita Jaya	Qualifying first round	3–4 (Disqualified)	(Singapore) Geylang International	1–2 in first match 2–2 in second match
1992–93	Arseto Solo	4th in group stage	N/A	(Japan) Yomiuri, (Saudi Arabia) Al-Shabab, (Bahrain) Al-Muharraq	
1993–94	Arema Malang	First round	3–6	(Thailand) Thai Farmers Bank	2–2 in first match 1–4 in second match
1994–95	Pelita Jaya	Second round	1–5	(South Korea) Ilhwa Chunma	1–1 in first match 0–4 in second match
1995	Persib Bandung	4th in quarter-finals group	N/A	(South Korea) Ilhwa Chunma, (Thailand) Thai Farmers Bank, (Japan) Verdy Kawasaki	
1996–97	PSM Makassar	Qualifying first round	1–4	(South Korea) Pohang Steelers	1–0 in first match 0–4 in second match
1997–98	Persebaya Surabaya	Qualifying first round	2–6	(South Korea) Ulsan Hyundai Horang-i	1–2 in first match 1–4 in second match
1998–99	None entered				
1999–2000	PSIS Semarang	Qualifying first round	4–9	(South Korea) Suwon Samsung Bluewings	2–3 in first match 2–6 in second match
2000–01	PSM Makassar	4th in quarter-finals group	N/A	(Japan) Júbilo Iwata, (South Korea) Suwon Samsung Bluewings, (China) Shandong Luneng Taishan	
2001–02	Persija Jakarta	First round	1–4	(Japan) Kashima Antlers	1–4 in first match Second match cancelled
2002–03	Petrokimia Putra	Qualifying round 2	4–6	(China) Shanghai Shenhua	3–1 in first match 1–5 in second match
2002–03	Persita Tangerang	Qualifying round 2	0–1	(Thailand) Osotsapa	0–1 in first match 0–0 in second match
2004	PSM Makassar	4th in group stage	N/A	(China) Dalian Shide, (Vietnam) Hoang Anh Gia Lai, (Thailand) Krung Thai Bank	
2004	Persik Kediri	3rd in group stage	N/A	(South Korea) Seongnam Ilhwa Chunma, (Japan) Yokohama F. Marinos, (Vietnam) Binh Dinh	
2005	PSM Makassar	3rd in group stage	N/A	(China) Shandong Luneng Taishan, (Japan) Yokohama F. Marinos, (Thailand) BEC Tero Sasana	
2005	Persebaya Surabaya	3rd in group stage	N/A	(South Korea) Busan I'Park, (Thailand) Krung Thai Bank, (Vietnam) Binh Dinh	
2006	Disqualified (Persipura Jayapura, Arema Malang)				
2007	Persik Kediri	3rd in group stage	N/A	(Japan) Urawa Red Diamonds, (Australia) Sydney FC, (China) Shanghai Shenhua	
2007	Arema Malang	3rd in group stage	N/A	(Japan) Kawasaki Frontale, (South Korea) Chunnam Dragons, (Thailand) Bangkok University	
2008	None entered (Note: In the 2008 edition, Indonesia were allocated two slots just like the older editions. However, on 12 December 2007, AFC awarded one Indonesian slots to Thailand and the other one to Vietnam, due to delay in Indonesian domestic league and cup tournament.)				
2009	PSMS Medan	Qualifying play-off	1–2 (a.e.t.)	Singapore Armed Forces	Jalan Besar Stadium, Singapore
2009	Sriwijaya	4th in group stage	N/A	(Japan) Gamba Osaka, (South Korea) Seoul, (China) Shandong Luneng	
2010	Sriwijaya	Qualifying play-off	0–3	Singapore Armed Forces	Jalan Besar Stadium, Singapore
2010	Persipura Jayapura	4th in group stage	N/A	(Japan) Kashima Antlers, (South Korea) Jeonbuk Hyundai Motors, (China) Changchun Yatai	
2011	Sriwijaya	Qualifying play-off	0–4	(United Arab Emirates) Al-Ain	Gelora Sriwijaya Stadium, Palembang
2011	Arema	4th in group stage	N/A	(South Korea) Jeonbuk Hyundai Motors, (Japan) Cerezo Osaka, (China) Shandong Luneng	
2012	Persipura Jayapura	Qualifying play-off	0–3	(Australia) Adelaide United	Hindmarsh Stadium, Adelaide
2013	None entered				
2014	None entered				
2015	Persib Bandung	Preliminary round 2	0–4	(Vietnam) Hanoi T&T	Mỹ Đình National Stadium, Hanoi
2016	Banned due to FIFA suspension				
2017	None entered				
2018	Bali United	Preliminary round 2	1–2 (a.e.t.)	(Thailand) Chiangrai United	Singha Stadium, Chiang Rai
2019	Persija Jakarta	Preliminary round 2	1–3 (a.e.t.)	(Australia) Newcastle Jets	Newcastle International Sports Centre, Newcastle
2020	Bali United	Preliminary round 2	0–5	(Australia) Melbourne Victory	AAMI Park, Melbourne
2021	None entered				
2022	None entered				
2023–24	Bali United	Preliminary round	1–5	(Hong Kong) Lee Man	Hong Kong Stadium, Hong Kong
2024–25	None entered				
2025–26	None entered				
2026–27	None entered				

=== AFC Champions League Two ===
- GS : Group stage, ASF : ASEAN Semi-finals, R16 : Round of 16, AF : ASEAN Final, QF : Quarter-finals, IZSF : Inter-zone Semi-finals, SF : Semi-finals, IZF : Inter-zone Final, RU : Runners-up, W : Winners
- 2003–2024 : AFC Cup
- 2024–present : AFC Champions League Two

Participations
Team	Qualified	2009	2010	2011	2012	2013	2014	2015	2017	2018	2019	2020	2021	2022	23–24	24–25	25–26	26–27
Persib Bandung	4 times							R16	(Note: Persib Bandung and Persipura Jayapura as champions and runners-up of 2014 Indonesia Super League are actually entitled to participate in the 2017 AFC Cup. But Football Association of Indonesia did not register them with the AFC.)							GS	R16	TBD
Bali United	4 times									GS		GS	(Note: On 7 July 2021, AFC decided to cancel the matches in ASEAN Zone.)	GS	GS			
PSM Makassar	4 times										ASF	GS		AF	GS			
Persipura Jayapura	3 times			QF			SF	R16										
Sriwijaya	2 times		R16	R16														
Arema	2 times				QF		R16											
Persija Jakarta	2 times									ASF	GS							
PSMS Medan	1 time	R16																
Persiwa Wamena	1 time		GS															
Semen Padang	1 time					QF												
Persibo Bojonegoro	1 time					GS												

==== Results ====
Season	Club	Progress	Score	Opponents	Venue(s)
2004	No entrants				
2005	No entrants				
2006	No entrants				
2007	No entrants				
2008	No entrants				
2009	PSMS Medan	Round of 16	0–4	(Thailand) Chonburi	Rajamangala Stadium, Bangkok
2010	Persiwa Wamena	4th in group stage	N/A	(Hong Kong) South China, (Thailand) Muangthong United, (Maldives) VB Sports Club	
2010	Sriwijaya	Round of 16	1–4	(Thailand) Thai Port	Gelora Sriwijaya Stadium, Palembang
2011	Sriwijaya	Round of 16	0–3	(Thailand) Chonburi	IPE Chonburi Stadium, Chonburi
2011	Persipura Jayapura	Quarter-finals	1–3	(Iraq) Arbil	1–2 at Mandala Stadium; 0–1 at Franso Hariri Stadium
2012	Arema	Quarter-finals	0–4	(Saudi Arabia) Al-Ettifaq	0–2 at Gajayana Stadium; 0–2 at Prince Mohamed bin Fahd Stadium
2013	Persibo Bojonegoro	4th in group stage	N/A	(Maldives) New Radiant, (Myanmar) Yangon United, (Hong Kong) Sunray Cave JC Sun Hei	
2013	Semen Padang	Quarter-finals	1–2	(India) East Bengal	0–1 at Salt Lake Stadium; 1–1 at Gelora Haji Agus Salim Stadium
2014	Arema Cronus	Round of 16	0–2	(Hong Kong) Kitchee	Mong Kok Stadium, Hong Kong
2014	Persipura Jayapura	Semi-finals	2–10	(Kuwait) Al-Qadsia	2–4 at Al-Kuwait Sports Club Stadium; 0–6 at Mandala Stadium
2015	Persipura Jayapura	Round of 16	0–3 (awd.)	(Malaysia) Pahang	Match was not played (Note: The AFC awarded the match 3–0 to Pahang as their players were denied entry into Indonesia due to visa issues.)
2015	Persib Bandung	Round of 16	0–2	(Hong Kong) Kitchee	Si Jalak Harupat Stadium, Bandung
2016	Banned due to FIFA suspension				
2017	None entered				
2018	Bali United	4th in group stage	N/A	(Myanmar) Yangon United, (Philippines) Global Cebu, (Vietnam) FLC Thanh Hóa	
2018	Persija Jakarta	ASEAN semi-finals	3–6	(Singapore) Home United	2–3 at Jalan Besar Stadium; 1–3 at Gelora Bung Karno Stadium
2019	Persija Jakarta	3rd in group stage	N/A	(Philippines) Ceres–Negros, (Vietnam) Becamex Bình Dương, (Myanmar) Shan United	
2019	PSM Makassar	ASEAN semi-finals	2–2 (a)	(Vietnam) Becamex Binh Duong	0–1 at Hàng Đẫy Stadium; 2–1 at Pakansari Stadium
2020	Bali United	Edition cancelled (Note: 2020 edition was cancelled due to the COVID-19 pandemic and the group stage is in progress 3 matches.)	N/A	(Philippines) Ceres–Negros, (Vietnam) Than Quảng Ninh, (Cambodia) Svay Rieng	
2020	PSM Makassar	Edition cancelled	N/A	(Singapore) Tampines Rovers, (Philippines) Kaya-Iloilo, (Myanmar) Shan United	
2021	Bali United	ASEAN zone cancelled	N/A	(Vietnam) Hanoi, (Cambodia) Boeung Ket	
2021	Persipura Jayapura	ASEAN zone cancelled	N/A	(Malaysia) Kedah Darul Aman, (Singapore) Lion City Sailors, (Vietnam) Saigon	
2022	Bali United	3rd in group stage	N/A	(Philippines) Kaya-Iloilo, (Malaysia) Kedah Darul Aman, (Cambodia) Visakha	
2022	PSM Makassar	ASEAN final	2–5	(Malaysia) Kuala Lumpur City	Kuala Lumpur Stadium, Kuala Lumpur
2023–24	Bali United	3rd in group stage	N/A	(Australia) Central Coast Mariners, (Malaysia) Terengganu, (Philippines) Stallion Laguna	
2023–24	PSM Makassar	3rd in group stage	N/A	(Malaysia) Sabah, (Vietnam) Haiphong, (Singapore) Hougang United	
2024–25	Persib Bandung	4th in group stage	N/A	(Singapore) Lion City Sailors, (Thailand) Port, (China) Zhejiang	
2025–26	Persib Bandung	Round of 16	1–3	(Thailand) Ratchaburi	0–3 at Dragon Solar Park; 1–0 at Gelora Bandung Lautan Api Stadium
2026–27	Persib Bandung				

=== AFC Challenge League ===
- QS : Qualification stage, GS : Group stage, QF : Quarterfinals, SF : Semifinals, RU : Runners-up, W : Winners

Participations
Team	Qualified	24–25	25–26	26–27
Madura United	1 time	SF		
Dewa United Banten	1 time		QF	
Borneo Samarinda	1 time			

==== Results ====
Year	Team	Progress	Score	Opponents	Venue(s)
2024–25	Madura United	Semi-finals	3–6	(Cambodia) Preah Khan Reach Svay Rieng	0–3 at Morodok Techo National Stadium; 3–3 at Gelora Joko Samudro Stadium
2025–26	Dewa United Banten	Quarter-finals	2–3	(Philippines) Manila Digger	0–1 at Rizal Memorial Stadium; 2–2 at Sports Centre Kelapa Dua
2026–27	Borneo Samarinda				

== Past Competitions ==
=== Asian Cup Winners' Cup ===
- R1 : First round, R2 : Second round, QF : Quarter-finals, SF : Semi-finals, RU : Runners-up, W : Winners

Participations
Team	Qualified	90–91	91–92	92–93	93–94	94–95	1995	96–97	97–98	99–00	00–01	01–02
Pupuk Kaltim	3 times		SF	R2							R2	
PSM Makassar	2 times								QF			R1
Krama Yudha Tiga Berlian	1 time	R2										
Semen Padang	1 time				QF							
Gelora Dewata	1 time					R2						
Petrokimia Putra	1 time						QF					
Bandung Raya	1 time							R2				
Persebaya Surabaya	1 time									R2		

==== Results ====
Season	Club	Progress	Score	Opponents	Venue(s)
1990–91	Krama Yudha Tiga Berlian	Second round	–	(China) Dalian	Withdrawn
1991–92	Pupuk Kaltim	Semi-finals	0–2	(Japan) Nissan	2–0 in first match 0–0 in second match
1992–93	Pupuk Kaltim	Second round	2–4	(Japan) Yokohama F. Marinos	1–1 in first match 1–3 in second match
1993–94	Semen Padang	Quarter-finals	2–12	(Japan) Nissan	2–1 in first match 0–11 in second match
1994–95	Gelora Dewata	Second round	–	(Malaysia) Kuala Lumpur FA	Disqualified
1995	Petrokimia Putra	Quarter-finals	1–7	(Japan) Bellmare Hiratsuka	0–6 in first match 1–1 in second match
1996–97	Bandung Raya	Second round	1–5	(Hong Kong) South China	1–1 in first match 0–4 in second match
1997–98	PSM Makassar	Quarter-finals	0–13	(South Korea) Suwon Samsung Bluewings	0–1 in first match 0–12 in second match
1998–99	None entered				
1999–2000	Persebaya Surabaya	Second round	0–6	(Thailand) Bangkok Bank	0–5 in first match 0–1 in second match
2000–01	Pupuk Kaltim	Second round	1–5	(Thailand) BEC Tero Sasana	0–1 in first match 1–4 in second match
2001–02	PSM Makassar	First round	2–4	(Maldives) Victory SC	0–3 in first match 2–1 in second match
