= Busan IPark in international competitions =

Busan IPark is a South Korean professional football club based in Busan, South Korea, who currently play in the K League 2.

Busan IPark have won the AFC Champions League one time. Their most recent participation in the competition was in 2005.

== Results ==
=== AFC Champions League ===
Season	Round	Opposition	Home	Away	Agg.
2005	Group G	(Vietnam) Bình Định	8–0	4–0	1st
2005	Group G	(Thailand) Krung Thai Bank	4–0	2–0	1st
2005	Group G	(Indonesia) Persebaya Surabaya	4–0	3–0	1st
2005	Quarter-final	(Qatar) Al-Sadd	3–0	2–1	5–1
2005	Semi-final	(Saudi Arabia) Al-Ittihad	0–5	0–2	0–7

=== Asian Club Championship ===
Season	Round	Opposition	Home	Away	Agg.
1985–86	Qualifying Round	(Macau) Wa Seng	9–0	5–1	14–1
1985–86	Quarter-finals	(Thailand) Bangkok Bank	3–1		1st
1985–86	Quarter-finals	(Syria) Al-Ittihad	1–0		1st
1985–86	Semi-final	(Indonesia) Krama Yudha Tiga Berlian	3–0		—
1985–86	Final	(Saudi Arabia) Al-Ahli	3–1 (a.e.t.)		—
1998-99	First Round	(Maldives) Club Valencia	4–0	2–0	6–0
1998-99	Second Round	(Sri Lanka) Saunders SC	5–0	4–1	9–1
1998-99	Quarter-finals	(China) Dalian Wanda	2–2		4th
1998-99	Quarter-finals	(South Korea) Pohang Steelers	1–1		4th
1998-99	Quarter-finals	(Japan) Júbilo Iwata	0–2		4th

=== Afro-Asian Club Championship ===
Season	Opposition	Home	Away	Agg.
1986	(Morocco) FAR Rabat	2–0		
