= Abdul Rashid =

ʻAbd al-Rashīd (ALA-LC romanization of Arabic: عبد الرشيد) is a male Muslim given name, and in modern usage, surname. It is built from the Arabic words ʻabd and al-Rashīd, one of the names of God in the Qur'an, which give rise to the Muslim theophoric names. It means "servant of the right-minded".

Because the letter r is a sun letter, the letter l of the al- is assimilated to it. Thus although the name is written in Arabic with letters corresponding to Abd al-Rashid, the usual pronunciation corresponds to Abd ar-Rashid. Alternative transliterations include ‘Abd ar-Rasheed and others, all subject to variable spacing and hyphenation.

It should not be confused with ʻAbd al-Rāshid (Arabic: عبد الراشد).

It may refer to:

== Politicians ==
- Maulana Abdur Rashid Tarkabagish (1900–1986), Bangladeshi politician
- Sardar Abdur Rashid Khan (1906–1995), senior police officer and cabinet minister in Pakistan
- Abdirashid Ali Shermarke (1919–1969), President and Prime Minister of Somalia
- Abdirashid Yusuf Jibril, Somali politician, former speaker of House of Representatives (Puntland)
- Chauhdry Abdul Rashid (1941–2024), Pakistani-British politician
- Maher Abd al-Rashid, (1942–2014), Iraqi general
- Abdul Rashid Shaheen (born 1945), Indian politician
- Abdul Rasheed Hussain (born 1946), Maldivian politician
- Abdul Rashid Dostum (born 1954), Afghan soldier and politician
- Abderrachid Boukerzaza (born 1955), Algerian politician
- Abdirashid Mohamed Hidig, Somali politician
- Abdur Rasheed Turabi, politician in Azad, Jammu & Kashmir
- Abdul Rashid Godil (born 1960), Pakistani politician
- Omar Abdirashid Ali Sharmarke (born 1960), Prime Minister of Somalia
- Abdur Rashid (1938–2017), Bangladeshi academic and politician
- Abdur Rashid, Pakistani politician, senator 2006–2012

== Sports ==
- Lala Abdul Rashid (1922–1988), member of Pakistan's 1960 Olympics field Hockey team
- Abdul Rashid (runner) (born 1928), Pakistani long-distance runner
- Muhammad Rashid (field hockey, born 1941) (1941–2009), Pakistani Olympic silver medallist in field hockey, incorrectly referred to in some sources as "Muhammad Abdul Rashid"
- Abdul Rashid (field hockey, born 1947) (1947–2020), Pakistani hockey player
- Abdul Rasheed Baloch (born 1972), Pakistani boxer
- Abdul Rashid Qambrani (born 1975), Pakistani boxer
- Mohd Rafdi Abdul Rashid (born 1977), Malaysian footballer
- Abdul Rashid (hurdler) (1979–2025), Pakistani Olympic sprint hurdler
- Abdur Rashid (cricketer) (born 1987), Bangladeshi cricketer
- Abdulrashid Sadulaev (born 1996), Russian freestyle wrestler, two time Olympic gold medalist
- Qais Abdur Rashid (575–661), legendary ancestor of the Pashtun race
- Abdurashid Khan (1508–1560), ruler of Yarkand Khanate in Uyghurstan (Eastern Turkestan)
- Abdurreshid Ibrahim (1857–1944), Russia-born Tatar Muslim scholar, journalist, and traveller
- Mian Abdul Rashid (1889–1981), Chief Justice of Pakistan
- Abdur Rashid Kardar (1904–1989), Pakistani actor and director
- Abdul Rashid Khan (1908–2016), Indian musician
- Abdul Rashid (agriculturist) (born 1950), Pakistani agricultural scientist and bioscientist
- Abdul Rashid Ghazi (1964−2007), Pakistani Muslim cleric
- Abdirashid Duale (born 1977), Somali businessman

== Scholar ==
- Abdul Rachid Soufi (born 1962) Somali-Qatari Quran recitor
- Reşit Rahmeti Arat (né Ğabderrəşit Rəxmətullin; 1900–1964), Turkish philologist of Tatar descent
