= 1987 Asian Club Championship =

7th edition of premier club football tournament organized by the AFC

Tournament details
- Dates: 3 November – 7 November 1987
- Teams: 7 (final tournament)

Final positions
- Champions: (Japan) Yomiuri FC (1st title)
- Runners-up: (Saudi Arabia) Al-Hilal

Tournament statistics
- Matches played: 9
- Goals scored: 25 (2.78 per match)

The 1987 Asian Club Championship was the 7th edition of the annual Asian club football competition hosted by Asian Football Confederation. Several Asian clubs started the qualifying round in fall 1987.

Yomiuri FC became the second Japanese club to win the Asian Club Championship.

== Qualifying round ==
=== Group 1 ===
Pos	Team	Pld	W	D	L	GF	GA	GD	Pts	Qualification
1	(Kuwait) Kazma (H)	4	3	0	1	6	1	+5	6	Advance to Group stage
2	(Saudi Arabia) Al-Hilal	4	2	1	1	6	3	+3	5	Advance to Group stage
3	(Bahrain) Muharraq	4	2	0	2	5	7	−2	4	
4	(United Arab Emirates) Al-Nasr	4	1	1	2	3	4	−1	3	
5	(Oman) Fanja	4	1	0	3	4	9	−5	2	

Source: RSSSF
(H) Hosts

=== Group 2 ===
All matches were played in Dhaka, Bangladesh.

Pos	Team	Pld	W	D	L	GF	GA	GD	Pts	Qualification
1	(Iraq) Al Rasheed	4	4	0	0	23	2	+21	8	Advance to Group stage
2	(India) Mohun Bagan	4	2	1	1	12	6	+6	5	
3	(Bangladesh) Dhaka Mohammedan (H)	4	2	1	1	12	10	+2	5	
4	(Nepal) Manang Marsyangdi	4	1	0	3	8	19	−11	2	
5	Pakistan Air Force	4	0	0	4	3	21	−18	0	

Source: RSSSF
(H) Hosts
8 June 1987

Dhaka Mohammedan (Bangladesh)	6–2	(Nepal) Manang Marsyangdi
Ezeugo 19' (pen.), 37'; Babul 75'; Naalchegar 40'; Borhanzadeh 41', 80'		Thapa 8', 44' (pen.)

Dhaka Stadium
Referee: Somporn Patcharamamukdakorn (Thailand)

9 June 1987

Mohun Bagan (India)	4–1	Pakistan Air Force
Chatterjee 16'; Ghosh 27', 60'; Banerjee 40'		Rahman 44'

Dhaka Stadium
Referee: Ahmed Aziz (Bangladesh)

10 June 1987

Al Rasheed (Iraq)	6–1	(Nepal) Manang Marsyangdi
Qais 16', 37'; Abdul-Abbas 72'; Hassan 75'; Hussein 79', 80'		Jang 55'

Dhaka Stadium
Referee: Abdur Rashid (Bangladesh)
11 June 1987

Dhaka Mohammedan (Bangladesh)	3–1	Pakistan Air Force
Sabbir 43', 56'; Naalchegar 69'		Shakoor 11'

Dhaka Stadium
Referee: Vangshaman Bodhiniman (Thailand)

12 June 1987

Al Rasheed (Iraq)	2–0	(India) Mohun Bagan
Hussein 13'; Shaker 22'

Dhaka Stadium
Attendance: 25,000
Referee: Kong Tiam (Thailand)
12 June 1987

Manang Marsyangdi (Nepal)	4–1	Pakistan Air Force
Krishna 42'; Shah 55', 73'; Thapa 56'		Shakoor 57'

Dhaka Stadium
Referee: Zahirul Haque (Bangladesh)

13 June 1987

Dhaka Mohammedan (Bangladesh)	2–2	(India) Mohun Bagan
Borhanzadeh 13'; Ezeugo 39'		Ghosh 87', 89'

Dhaka Stadium
Referee: Kong Tiam (Thailand)

14 June 1987

Al Rasheed (Iraq)	10–0	Pakistan Air Force
Hassan 9', 13', 63', 66'; Qais 18', 36'; Shakir 14'; Allawi 19'; Abdul-Abbas 57'; Hussein 76'

Dhaka Stadium
Referee: Ansarkul Islam (Bangladesh)

16 June 1987

Mohun Bagan (India)	6–1	(Nepal) Manang Marsyangdi
Amalraj 2', 7'; Chatterjee 18', 70'; Gosh 87', 89'		Thapa 6'

Dhaka Stadium
Referee: Abdul Khalek (Bangladesh)
16 June 1987

Al Rasheed (Iraq)	5–1	(Bangladesh) Dhaka Mohammedan
Qais 21'; Allawi 30', 52'; Hussein 34'; Daham 73'		Ezeugo 44'

Dhaka Stadium
Referee: Somporn Patcharamamukdakorn (Thailand)

=== Group 3 ===
All matches were played in Malé, Maldives.

Pos	Team	Pld	W	D	L	GF	GA	GD	Pts	Qualification
1	(Thailand) Bangkok Bank	2	1	1	0	7	0	+7	3	Advance to Group stage
2	(Sri Lanka) Air Force	2	0	2	0	1	1	0	2	
3	(Maldives) Victory (H)	2	0	1	1	1	8	−7	1	

Source: RSSSF
(H) Hosts

Bangkok Bank (Thailand)	0–0	(Sri Lanka) Air Force

National Stadium, Malé

Bangkok Bank (Thailand)	7–0	(Maldives) Victory

National Stadium, Malé

Air Force (Sri Lanka)	1–1	(Maldives) Victory

National Stadium, Malé

=== Group 4 ===
All matches were played in Bandung, Indonesia.

Pos	Team	Pld	W	D	L	GF	GA	GD	Pts	Qualification
1	(Malaysia) Federal Territory	3	2	1	0	10	1	+9	5	Advance to Group stage
2	(Indonesia) Krama Yudha Tiga Berlian (H)	3	2	0	1	8	3	+5	4	
3	(Singapore) Tiong Bahru	3	1	1	1	3	5	−2	3	
4	(Brunei) Kota Ranger	3	0	0	3	4	16	−12	0	

Source: RSSSF
(H) Hosts
5 June 1987

Krama Yudha Tiga Berlian (Indonesia)	5–1	(Brunei) Kota Ranger
Harhara (?); Pariama (?); Fabanyo (?)		Ghani (?)

Siliwangi Stadium
Attendance: 5.000
5 June 1987

Federal Territory (Malaysia)	0–0	(Singapore) Tiong Bahru

Siliwangi Stadium, Bandung

6 June 1987

Federal Territory (Malaysia)	8–1	(Brunei) Kota Ranger

Siliwangi Stadium, Bandung
6 June 1987

Krama Yudha Tiga Berlian (Indonesia)	3–0	(Singapore) Tiong Bahru
Fabanyo 14'; Hidayat 41', 72'

Siliwangi Stadium, Bandung

8 June 1987

Tiong Bahru (Singapore)	3–2	(Brunei) Kota Ranger
Mata 4'; Ahmad 20' (pen.); Mokhtar 85'		Samak 7'; Musanib 35'

Siliwangi Stadium, Bandung
8 June 1987

Krama Yudha Tiga Berlian (Indonesia)	0–2	(Malaysia) Federal Territory
		Kannan (?)

Siliwangi Stadium, Bandung

=== Group 5 ===
All matches were played in Dalian, China.

Pos	Team	Pld	W	D	L	GF	GA	GD	Pts	Qualification
1	(China) August 1 (H)	2	2	0	0	5	0	+5	4	Advance to Group stage
2	(North Korea) April 25	2	1	0	1	2	3	−1	2	
3	(Macau) Hap Kuan	2	0	0	2	1	5	−4	0	

Source: RSSSF
(H) Hosts

August 1 (China)	2–0	(North Korea) April 25

Dalian People's Stadium, Dalian

August 1 (China)	3–0	(Macau) Hap Kuan

Dalian People's Stadium, Dalian

April 25 (North Korea)	2–1	(Macau) Hap Kuan

Dalian People's Stadium, Dalian

=== Group 6 ===
Matches were played home and away.

Pos	Team	Pld	W	D	L	GF	GA	GD	Pts	Qualification
1	(Japan) Yomiuri	2	2	0	0	3	0	+3	4	Advance to Group stage
2	(Hong Kong) South China	2	0	0	2	0	3	−3	0	

Source: RSSSF
10 September 1987

South China (Hong Kong)	0–1	(Japan) Yomiuri

Government Stadium, Hong Kong

8 October 1987

Yomiuri (Japan)	2–0	(Hong Kong) South China

Yoyogi National Stadium, Tokyo

== Group stage ==
=== Group A ===
All matches were played in Riyadh, Saudi Arabia.

Pos	Team	Pld	W	D	L	GF	GA	GD	Pts	Qualification
1	(Saudi Arabia) Al-Hilal (H)	2	2	0	0	6	1	+5	4	Advance to Final
2	(Iraq) Al Rasheed	2	1	0	1	7	3	+4	2	
3	(Thailand) Bangkok Bank	2	0	0	2	1	10	−9	0	

Source: RSSSF
(H) Hosts
23 August 1987

Al-Hilal (Saudi Arabia)	4–0	(Thailand) Bangkok Bank
Al-Yousef 2'; Al-Musaibeah 22'; Al-Thunayan 44', 85'

Youth Welfare Stadium, Riyadh

25 August 1987

Al Rasheed (Iraq)	6–1	(Thailand) Bangkok Bank

Youth Welfare Stadium, Riyadh

27 August 1987

Al-Hilal (Saudi Arabia)	2–1	(Iraq) Al Rasheed
Al-Yousef 44'; M. Al-Owairan 62'	Report	Qais 49'

Youth Welfare Stadium, Riyadh

=== Group B ===
All matches were played in Kuala Lumpur, Malaysia.

Pos	Team	Pld	W	D	L	GF	GA	GD	Pts	Qualification
1	(Japan) Yomiuri	3	2	0	1	4	2	+2	4	Advance to Final
2	(Malaysia) Federal Territory (H)	3	1	2	0	3	2	+1	4	
3	(Kuwait) Kazma	3	1	1	1	3	3	0	3	
4	(China) August 1	3	0	1	2	1	4	−3	1	

Source: RSSSF
(H) Hosts
3 November 1987

Yomiuri (Japan)	2–1	(Kuwait) Kazma
Kato 4'; Cruz 70'		Al-Shemmari 89'

3 November 1987

Federal Territory (Malaysia)	1–1	(China) August 1
Fandi 59'		Jia Xiuquan 26'

5 November 1987

Yomiuri (Japan)	0–1	(Malaysia) Federal Territory
		Aslokani 62'

5 November 1987

Kazma (Kuwait)	1–0	(China) August 1
Al-Ghanem 54'

7 November 1987

Yomiuri (Japan)	2–0	(China) August 1
Cruz 53'; Vegima 72'

7 November 1987

Federal Territory (Malaysia)	1–1	(Kuwait) Kazma
Fandi 60'		Baroun 35'

== Final ==
Team 1	Score	Team 2
Al-Hilal (Saudi Arabia)	w/o	(Japan) Yomiuri

The final was scratched and Yomiuri were awarded the championship as Al-Hilal were unable to field a team due to nine of their starting players being chosen for the Saudi national team's preparation camp that clashed with the date fixed for the first leg.
