= ASEAN Champions' Cup =

1985 ASEAN Champions' Cup
Tournament details
- Teams: 5 (from AFC confederations)
- Venue: 2 (in 2 host cities)

Final positions
- Champions: (Thailand) Bangkok Bank
- Runners-up: (Indonesia) Krama Yudha Tiga Berlian

Tournament statistics
- Matches played: 11
- Goals scored: 30 (2.73 per match)

The 1985 ASEAN Champions' Cup was an international football competition which served as the qualifier for the 1985–86 Asian Club Championship.

It was held between the domestic champion club sides affiliated with the member associations of the ASEAN Football Federation (AFF). The tournament was held at two venues in Indonesia. Bangkok Bank won the tournament, with both Bangkok Bank and Krama Yudha Tiga Berlian qualifying for the Asian Club Championship.

== History ==
The tournament was constituted as part of the different Asian zonal tournaments which were held at centralised venues with the winners of these zonal tournaments progressing into the main tournament which was held in Jeddah, Saudi Arabia. The champions of the Southeast Asian nations were selected to face each other consisting of teams from Indonesia, Thailand, Singapore, Malaysia, Brunei, Philippines and Burma however, the two teams from Philippines and Burma withdrew their names. The matches were held at Jakarta and Bandung in Indonesia. It was a precursor tournament among the Southeast Asian nations before the start of ASEAN Club Championship.

== Group stage ==
Pos	Team	Pld	W	D	L	GF	GA	GD	Pts	Qualification
1	(Indonesia) Krama Yudha Tiga Berlian (H)	4	3	1	0	15	1	+14	7	Qualification for the Asian Club Championship group stage
2	(Thailand) Bangkok Bank	4	3	1	0	10	2	+8	7	Qualification for the Asian Club Championship group stage
3	(Singapore) Tiong Bahru	4	1	1	2	2	7	−5	3	
4	(Malaysia) Malacca	4	1	1	2	2	7	−5	3	
5	Royal Brunei Armed Forces	4	0	0	4	0	12	−12	0	

Source: Champions' Cup 1985/86
(H) Hosts

Note: Burma and Philippines did not send a team.

20 December 1984

Krama Yudha Tiga Berlian (Indonesia)	5–0	(Singapore) Tiong Bahru
Malis 21', 90' (pen.); Nurdiansyah 30', 50', 81'

Senayan Stadium, Jakarta

21 December 1984

Malacca (Malaysia)	1–0	Royal Brunei Armed Forces
Torairaju 52' (pen.)

Senayan Stadium, Jakarta

21 December 1984

Bangkok Bank (Thailand)	2–0	(Singapore) Tiong Bahru
Acksala 37'; Suttaban 62'

Senayan Stadium, Jakarta

22 December 1984

Krama Yudha Tiga Berlian (Indonesia)	7–0	Royal Brunei Armed Forces
Malis; Ibrahim (o.g.); Nurdiansyah; Neere

Senayan Stadium, Jakarta

23 December 1984

Tiong Bahru (Singapore)	0–0	(Malaysia) Malacca

Siliwangi Stadium, Bandung

24 December 1984

Krama Yudha Tiga Berlian (Indonesia)	1–1	(Thailand) Bangkok Bank
Ristomoyo 42'		Kongsri 37'

Siliwangi Stadium, Bandung

26 December 1984

Bangkok Bank (Thailand)	5–1	(Malaysia) Malacca
Kongsri; Sattaban; Suksawat; Siritham		Abdullah

Senayan Stadium, Jakarta

26 December 1984

Tiong Bahru (Singapore)	2–0	Royal Brunei Armed Forces
Noor

Senayan Stadium, Jakarta

27 December 1984

Bangkok Bank (Thailand)	2–0	Royal Brunei Armed Forces
Kongsri 10'; Wichaya 88'

Senayan Stadium, Jakarta

27 December 1984

Krama Yudha Tiga Berlian (Indonesia)	2–0	(Malaysia) Malacca
Nurdiansyah

Senayan Stadium, Jakarta

== Final ==
29 December 1984

Krama Yudha Tiga Berlian (Indonesia)	0–1	(Thailand) Bangkok Bank
		Boonum Suksawat 54'

Senayan Stadium, Jakarta
Attendance: 80,000

== Winner ==
ASEAN Champions' Cup
1985 Winners

Bangkok Bank
