= Khalid Mahmood (Jamaat-e-Islami) =

5th Emir of Jamaat-e-Islami Kashmir

Emir of Jamaat-e-Islami Azad Kashmir and Gilgit-Baltistan
- Incumbent
- Assumed office 16 July 2017
- Preceded by: Abdur Rasheed Turabi
- Succeeded by: Dr M Mushtaq Khan

Personal details
- Party: Jamaat-e-Islami Kashmir

Khalid Mahmood served as the 5th Emir of Jamaat-e-Islami Kashmir. He was elected in June 2017 and took his oath of office on 16 July 2017 in Islamabad.

== Background ==
He comes from Rehara, a village in the city of Rawalakot, Azad Kashmir, Pakistan. He was formerly district ameer and naib ameer of JI Azad Jammu and Kashmir and Gilgit-Baltistan. He was a member of Islami Jamiat-e-Talaba and president of Chandka Medical College in Sindh, Pakistan. He is by profession a physician and runs a clinic named Rawalakot Hospital.

== Early life and education ==
He was born on 1956 in the village of Rehara, Rawalakot Azad Kashmir. He went to Government Sabir Shaheed Pilot High school Rawalakot. After matriculation, he joined Government Degree College Rawalakot. He went to Chandka Medical College Sindh for MBBS. He was the President of Islami Jamiat-e-Talaba in Chandka Medical college Sindh.
