= Abderrachid Boukerzaza =

Algerian politician

Minister of Communication
- President: Abdelaziz Bouteflika

Personal details
- Born: April 19, 1955
- Died: November 23, 2020 (aged 65)

Abderrachid Boukerzaza (born April 19, 1955 in Chahna – November 23, 2020) was an Algerian politician. Previously he had served as Minister of Communication in Abdelaziz Bouteflika's cabinet who appointed seven new government ministers. They replaced individuals who are closely associated with former Algerian prime minister, Ali Benflis, Bouteflika's rival.

== Education and previous occupations ==
Boukerzaza earned a B.S. in Physics Chemistry at the University of Constantine in June 1978. In 1982 he obtained an advanced degree in chemistry from the same institution. He was a professor at the University of Constantine from 1977 - 1986.

He served as secretary general of the UNJA from 1986 - 1999, was a member of the central committee of the FLN from 1986 - 1998, and a deputy with the national popular parliament 1997 - 2002. Boukerzaza was a former minister of territorial development & environment in charge of city.
