= Riyadh Abdul-Abbas =

Iraqi footballer

Riyadh Abbas
Personal information
- Full name: Riyadh Abdul-Abbas
- Place of birth: Iraq
- Position: Striker

Senior career*
Years	Team	Apps	(Gls)
- Johor FA
1996	Kelantan FA		

International career
1989–1990	Iraq		
- * Club domestic league appearances and goals

Riyadh Abbas is an Iraqi former footballer.

Part of the Kelantan squad in 1996, Abbas was chosen by then coach Kelly Tham as one of the foreign players to lead the attack for the club in the Liga Perdana, the previous Malaysian top-flight before the burgeoning Malaysia Super League.
