= Emeka Ezeugo =

Nigerian footballer (born 1965)

Personal information
- Full name: Emeka Ezeugo
- Date of birth: 16 December 1965 (age 60)
- Place of birth: Aba, Nigeria
- Height: 1.84 m (6 ft 0 in)
- Position: Midfielder

Team information
- Current team: Abia Warriors (head coach)

Senior career*
Years	Team	Apps	(Gls)
1986	East Bengal		
1987	Kolkata Mohammedan		
1987–1989	Dhaka Mohammedan		
1989–1990	Enugu Rangers		
1990	Pahang FA	34	(2)
1990–1992	Lyngby Boldklub	3	(0)
1992	Boldklubben Frem	20	(4)
1993–1994	Aalborg BK	4	(0)
1994	Budapest Honvéd	4	(0)
1994–1995	Fremad Amager	?	(?)
1995–1997	La Coruna B	?	(?)
1997	Mohun Bagan	4	(0)
1997–1998	Churchill Brothers	?	(?)
1998	Hershey Wildcats	16	(1)
1998–1999	Porthmadog	?	(?)
1999	Connecticut Wolves	19	(3)
2000	Deportivo Wanka		
2001	Estudiantes de Medicina		

International career
1988	Nigeria	3	(0)
1992–1994	Nigeria	11	(0)

Managerial career
- 2002: BMCC Athletics
- 2003–2005: Deportivo Municipal
- 2005–2008: City Tech
- 2008: Churchill Brothers
- 2011–2012: Dhaka Mohameddan
- 2013–: Abia Warriors
- * Club domestic league appearances and goals

Emeka Ezeugo (born 16 December 1965) is a Nigerian former professional footballer who played as a midfielder. He debuted as a professional footballer for Indian club East Bengal FC, has also represented the Nigeria national team in the FIFA World Cup. He last managed Abia Warriors FC as a football coach.

== Club career ==
Ezeugo was born in Aba. He played professionally for clubs in five different continents during a 15-year playing career after starting his career at East Bengal.

He started for Bangladeshi club, Mohammedan, towards the end of the 1980s. He later moved to the Danish League with middle of the table club Lyngby BK and prospered so much that he made it to the Nigerian national team for the 1994 FIFA World Cup. He came to India for a short spell in 1997 to play a few matches for Mohun Bagan AC.

== International career ==
Ezeugo first played for the Nigeria national team at the 1988 Summer Olympics in Seoul, South Korea. Nicknamed "Emmy", he obtained 11 caps for the national team between 1992 and 1994, and was a member of the team that competed at the 1994 FIFA World Cup.

== Coaching career ==
Ezeugo holds a US Soccer Federation coaching license and a KNVB Netherlands international license. Ezeugo has an envious coaching record over the past seven years, as he successfully completed his transition from player to coach that included a stint as the head coach at CUNY Borough of Manhattan Community College in 2002. In 2003 coached the Deportivo Municipal, Lima for two seasons before coming back to the United States, on 15 August 2005 was named as the new men's soccer coach at CUNY New York City College of Technology, here was between 2008.

Ezeugo spent summers 2004 to 2006 coaching at Camp Chateaugay, a summer camp located in New York's Adirondack Mountains for kids ages 7 to 15.

On 19 April 2008, he returned to India and signed a contract as head coach by his former club Churchill Brothers SC on 5 September 2008 was released from his contract.

He was then the chief coach of Heartland, a position he assumed less than a month ago.

On 31 October 2013, he was named the head coach of the newly promoted Nigeria Premier League team Abia Warriors.

== Personal life ==
Emeka's brother Valentine Ezuego, a former footballer in India, recommended the former Nigerian World Cupper to Churchill Bros patron Churchill Alemao.

== Conversion ==
In February 2012, while he was coach of Mohammedan Sporting Club of Bangladesh, he converted to Islam.

== Honours ==
Individual

- Nehru Centenary Club Cup – Taj Bengal Trophy for player of the tournament: 1990
