= Rehara =

Village in Azad Kashmir

Hills of Rehara

Rehara is a village in Poonch District of Azad Kashmir. It is located about 11 miles northeast of Rawalakot, Azad Kashmir.

== History ==
In 2010, the village was involved in an incident with the Capital Development Authority.
