= Abdur Rasheed Turabi =

Pakistani politician

Emir of Jamaat-e-Islami Azad Kashmir and Gilgit-Baltistan
- In office 1995–2017
- Succeeded by: Khalid Mahmood

Member of Azad Kashmir Legislative Assembly
- Incumbent
- Assumed office 29 July 2016

Personal details
- Party: Jamaat-e-Islami Pakistan

Abdur Rasheed Turabi is a well-known politician of Azad Jammu & Kashmir. He was the Emir of Jamaat-e-Islami Azad Kashmir till July 2017. Dr Khalid Mahmood is his successor and newly elected Ameer of JI AJK. He is a well known columnist and also has written books giving the guidelines of solution of Kashmir dispute. He remained President of Islami-e-Jamiat Talaba Kashmir Chapter (1974–76). He participated greatly in the freedom movement of Kashmir. He is member of Legislative Assembly of Azad Jammu & Kashmir. He is also member of Muslim World league.

== Early life and education ==
Turabi was born in 1954 and he belongs to Azad Jammu Kashmir's village Surroll. He completed his matriculation from Bagh High School and received his master's degree in Islamic Studies from Punjab University as well as he completed his LLB from Karachi University. During his student life, Abdul Rasheed took active part in politics and played his important role as President of Islami Jamiat-e-Talaba Azad Jammu Kashmir. After completion of education, Abdul Rasheed Turabi started advocating in the year 1983 and joined Jamaat-e-Islami Azad Kashmir during advocating. He was elected as general secretary of Jamaat-e-Islami Azad Kashmir for the first time while he was continuously 5 times nominated as Ameer of Jamaat-e-Islami Azad Kashmir in the year 1989 to 2002. Abdul Rasheed Turabi has written articles in English, Urdu and Arabic as he has also written several books on Kashmir issue which is providing guidance on the solution of Kashmir issue.

== Stance on Gilgit Baltistan ==
Turabi advocates for constitutional rights of GB people but is against making Gilgit-Baltistan the fifth province of Pakistan. He demands Joint administrative set up of Azad Kashmir and Gilgit Baltistan. As the government of Pakistan moves forward to introduce constitutional reforms in Gilgit Baltistan (GB), Kashmiri leaders have stood to oppose any move of making the region fifth province of Pakistan through some constitutional amendments. Addressing an All Parties Conference (APC) at the National Press Club on Wednesday, Kashmiri leaders including former prime ministers Sardar Attique Ahmad Khan and Sultan Mahmood, Chaudhry Lateef Akbar, Abdul Rasheed Turabi and others said that any move to change the constitutional status of the region would tantamount to divide the state of Kashmir. They through the resolution proposed a joint administrative set up for AJK and GB in which the president, prime minister, High Court and Kashmir Council will be the same for these two regions.

== Efforts for solution of Kashmir dispute ==
Turabi is known as an ambassador of Kashmir. He travels to renowned countries to get support for Kashmir freedom. In All Parties Kashmir Conference held in Mirpur, Abdul Rasheed Turabi along with PM AJK Raja Farooq Haider, Leader of the Opposition in AJK Legislative Assembly Chaudhry Muhammad Yasin, Ex-PM of AJK Chaudhry Abdul Majeed, All Jammu and Kashmir Muslim Conference President Sardar Attique Ahmed Khan, Justice (retd) Abdul Majeed Malik, PTI leader Khawaja Farooq Ahmed, Hurriyat leaders Ghulam Muhammad Saffi, Mir Tahir Masood, ex-president of AJK Sardar Muhammad Anwar said that the Kashmiri freedom movement would not be suppressed by Indian brutalities anymore. Kashmiri political leadership is united against Indian occupation. People of Jammu and Kashmir would continue their struggle for right to self-determination in accordance with United Nations resolutions till it is achieved. They said:“We reject ludicrous Indian claims of carrying out surgical strikes across the LoC, as blatantly false and brazen attempts at diverting international attention away from its atrocities in IoK”.

In a media talk in Sialkot Press Club, he asked the Pakistan government to take up the Kashmir issue with the International Court of Justice (ICJ) effectively. He said that India has provided a unique opportunity for Pakistan to move to ICJ with Kashmir dispute after Indian approach to ICJ in Indian spy Kalbhushan Jadhav's case. He said that Pakistan should launch massive global diplomatic campaign on Kashmir Issue as the time was ripe for the move. Turabi said that the world should resolve the burning Kashmir Issue as per the aspirations of the people of Kashmir, adding early freedom from Indian yoke and plebiscite to the people of Occupied Kashmir is their basic right and Pakistan should resolve the Kashmir Issue first. Turabi also urged the world to use its complete influence to globally pressurise India for the early peaceful solution to burning Kashmir dispute as per the aspirations of the people of the held valley. He expressed complete solidarity with the depressed people of the held valley and said that the sun of freedom of Kashmir will rise soon and people of Occupied Jammu and Kashmir will soon get freedom from Indian yoke. To a question, Turabi also asked the world to ensure Scotland-like plebiscite in Occupied Kashmir. He said that durable peace could never be established in Asia without the early solution to Kashmir Issue. He said that the Kashmir dispute had now become a flash point between the two nuclear neighbours. Later, addressing a meeting of the party workers, he claimed that Kashmir was running into the blood of the Pakistani nation. He urged the Pakistan government to globally pressurise India for ensuring the early implementation of the prolonged delayed UN Resolutions. He said that India should give the basic right of plebiscite to the people of the held valley. He vowed to make sincere efforts and even to sacrifice the last drop of his blood to save Pakistan from the enemies and to make Pakistan as a real Islamic welfare state as envisaged by the Quaid-i-Azam Muhammad Ali Jinnah. He strongly condemned the aggressive policy of India. He strongly criticised BJP government in India, alleging that the BJP was implementing the agenda to crush the Muslim in India.
