= 1972 Asian Champion Club Tournament =

Tournament details
- Host country: Iran
- Dates: April 1972
- Teams: 7
- Venue: Tehran

The 1972 Asian Champion Club Tournament was to be the fifth edition of the annual Asian club football competition organised by the Asian Football Confederation (AFC).

Seven clubs from seven countries were to compete in the tournament, which was to be held in Tehran, Iran in April 1972. The plans were to have the seven clubs split into two groups, with the group winners and the runners-up to advance to the semi-finals.

However, Hong Kong Rangers were forced to withdraw after the draw due to logistical and financial issues.

Later, Kuwaiti club Al-Qadsia and Lebanese club Racing Beirut both refused to commit to playing against Israeli club Maccabi Netanya for political reasons if the situation arose: the AFC excluded both clubs in response to prevent any repeat of Arab clubs forfeiting matches against Israeli clubs, which had occurred in a semi-final in 1970 and in a group match and the final in 1971. Consequently, only four teams were left to participate, or two in each group.

The Football Federation of Iran subsequently informed the AFC that they no longer considered it viable to invest 50% of the money and resources required for the tournament - including travel expenses to and from Tehran - due to likely heavy financial losses as a result of the reduction in matches.

On 2 April 1972, the AFC informed the remaining four teams that the tournament was postponed. It was ultimately cancelled.

== Participants ==
The seven clubs originally scheduled to participate were:

Teams:
Team	Qualifying method
Hong Kong Rangers	1970–71 Hong Kong First Division League champions
(Iran) Persepolis	1971–72 Local League champions
(Israel) Maccabi Netanya	1970–71 Liga Leumit champions
(Kuwait) Al-Qadsia	1970–71 Kuwaiti Premier League champions
(Lebanon) Racing Beirut	1969–70 Lebanese Premier League champions
(South Korea) Korea University	1971 Korean National Football Championship champions
Port Authority of Thailand	1972 Kor Royal Cup champions

== Teams location ==
Location of the 1972 Asian Champion Club Tournament planned teams
Red: Group A; Blue: Group B

== Groups ==
The draw for the groups had split the seven teams into two groups (one group of three, one group of four) prior to the tournament's cancellation, with the top two from each group to advance to the semi-finals. The tournament was scheduled to start on 12 April.

=== Group A ===
Team
(Israel) Maccabi Netanya
Hong Kong Rangers (withdrew)
(South Korea) Korea University

=== Group B ===
Team
(Iran) Persepolis
Port Authority of Thailand
(Kuwait) Al-Qadsia (excluded)
(Lebanon) Racing Beirut (excluded)
