= 1990–91 Asian Cup Winners' Cup =

Tournament details
- Teams: 17

Final positions
- Champions: (Iran) Persepolis F.C. (1st title)
- Runners-up: (Bahrain) Muharraq

The 1990–91 Asian Cup Winners' Cup was the first edition of Asian Cup Winners' Cup, the continental football competition for cup winners of member nations of the AFC.
Persepolis of Iran were duly crowned champions after defeating Muharraq of Bahrain 1–0 over two legs in the final.

Seventeen clubs entered the competition, but a number of clubs withdrew before games took place.

== Bracket ==
Round One
(Oman) Fanja	1	0	1
(Qatar) Al-Arabi	3	0	3
(Bahrain) Muharraq	5	3	8
(Lebanon) Nejmeh	1	0	1
(Jordan) Al-Faisaly	w/o
(Kuwait) Al-Qadsia^{1}
(Bangladesh) Mohammedan	w/o
(Sri Lanka) Renown SC^{1}
(Pakistan) Punjab	2	0	2
(Iran) Persepolis	4	9	13

Round Two
(Qatar) Al-Arabi	1	0	1
(Bahrain) Muharraq	0	4	4
(Jordan) Al-Faisaly	0	0	0
(United Arab Emirates) Al-Shabab	1	1	2
(Saudi Arabia) Al-Hilal	7	2	9
(Bangladesh) Mohammedan	0	1	1
(Iran) Persepolis	w/o
(South Korea) Daewoo Royals^{1}

Semi-finals
(Bahrain) Muharraq	1	2	3
(United Arab Emirates) Al-Shabab	0	2	2
(Saudi Arabia) Al-Hilal	0	0	0
(Iran) Persepolis	0	1	1

Final
(Bahrain) Muharraq	0	0	0
(Iran) Persepolis	0	1	1

^{1} Withdrew.

== First round ==
Team 1	Agg.	Team 2	1st leg	2nd leg
Punjab (Pakistan)	2–13	(Iran) Persepolis	2–4	0–9
Fanja (Oman)	1–3	(Qatar) Al Arabi	1–3	0–0
Muharraq (Bahrain)	8–1	(Lebanon) Nejmeh	5–1	3–0
Krama Yudha Tiga Berlian (Indonesia)	3–3 (a)	(Singapore) Geylang	1–1	2–2
Mohun Bagan (India)	0–5	(China) Dalian	0–1	0–4
Mohammedan (Bangladesh)	(w/o)^{2}	(Sri Lanka) Renown SC		
Al Faisaly (Jordan)	(w/o)^{1}	(Kuwait) Al Qadisiya		
Al Shabab (United Arab Emirates)	bye			
Al Hilal (Saudi Arabia)	bye			
Daewoo Royals (South Korea)	bye			

^{1} Al Qadisiya withdrew.
^{2} Renown SC withdrew.

== Second round ==
Team 1	Agg.	Team 2	1st leg	2nd leg
Persepolis (Iran)	(w/o)^{1}	(South Korea) Daewoo Royals		
Al Hilal (Saudi Arabia)	9–1	(Bangladesh) Mohammedan	7–0	2–1
Krama Yudha Tiga Berlian (Indonesia)	^{2}	(China) Dalian		
Al Faisaly (Jordan)	0–2	(United Arab Emirates) Al Shabab	0–1	0–1
Al Arabi (Qatar)	1–4	(Bahrain) Muharraq	1–0	0–4

^{1} Daewoo Royals withdrew.
^{2} Both Krama Yudha Tiga Berlian and Dalian withdrew; the tie was scratched.

== Third round ==
Team 1	Agg.	Team 2	1st leg	2nd leg
Al Hilal (Saudi Arabia)	0–1	(Iran) Persepolis	0–0	0–1
Muharraq (Bahrain)	3–2	(United Arab Emirates) Al Shabab	1–0	2–2

== Final ==
Team 1	Agg.	Team 2	1st leg	2nd leg
Muharraq (Bahrain)	0–1	(Iran) Persepolis	0–0	0–1

=== First game ===
4 October 1991

Muharraq (Bahrain)	0–0	(Iran) Persepolis

Bahrain National Stadium, Riffa

=== Second game ===
18 October 1991

Persepolis (Iran)	1–0	(Bahrain) Muharraq
Mohammad Hassan Ansarifard 52'

Azadi Stadium, Tehran
