= 1986 Asian Club Championship =

6th edition of premier club football tournament organized by the AFC

Tournament details
- Host country: Saudi Arabia
- Dates: 26 December – 30 December 1986
- Teams: 4 (final tournament)
- Venue: 1 (in 1 host city)

Final positions
- Champions: (Japan) Furukawa Electric (1st title)
- Runners-up: (Saudi Arabia) Al-Hilal
- Third place: (China) Liaoning F.C.
- Fourth place: (Iraq) Al-Talaba

Tournament statistics
- Matches played: 6
- Goals scored: 20 (3.33 per match)

The 1986 Asian Club Championship was the 6th edition of the annual Asian club football competition hosted by Asian Football Confederation. Several Asian clubs started the qualifying round in Fall of 1986. The final round was held in Riyadh, Saudi Arabia in December 1986.

Furukawa Electric defeated Al Hilal in the final to become the first Japanese club to win the Asian Club Championship.

Defending champions Daewoo Royals were unable to defend their title as they finished third in the 1985 K League.

== Qualifying Stage ==
=== Group 1 ===
(South Yemen) Al-Shorta Aden advanced to the second round by default, as they were the only team in Group 1.

=== Group 2 ===
Team 1	Score	Team 2
Al-Wehda Sana'a (Yemen Arab Republic)	0–2	(Iraq) Al-Talaba

27 July 1986

Al-Wehda Sana'a (Yemen Arab Republic)	0–2	(Iraq) Al-Talaba
	Report	Ashraf (?); Khaled (?)

Ali Mohsen al-Muraisi Stadium, Sana'a

Al-Talaba advanced to the second round.

=== Group 3 ===
Qualification from the 1986 GCC Champions League held in Bahrain.

==== Participants ====
- Al-Bahrain
- (Kuwait) Al-Arabi Sporting Club
- (Oman) Dhofar
- (Qatar) Al-Arabi Sports Club
- (Saudi Arabia) Al-Hilal (hosts)
- (United Arab Emirates) Al-Nasr
14 April 1986

Al-Hilal (Saudi Arabia)	2–1	Al-Bahrain
	Report

Prince Faisal bin Fahd Sports City Stadium, Riyadh

17 April 1986

Al-Hilal (Saudi Arabia)	2–1	(Oman) Dhofar
	Report

Prince Faisal bin Fahd Sports City Stadium, Riyadh

20 April 1986

Al-Hilal (Saudi Arabia)	1–2	(Qatar) Al-Arabi Sports Club
	Report

Prince Faisal bin Fahd Sports City Stadium, Riyadh

23 April 1986

Al-Hilal (Saudi Arabia)	5–0	(United Arab Emirates) Al-Nasr
	Report

Prince Faisal bin Fahd Sports City Stadium, Riyadh

26 April 1986

Al-Hilal (Saudi Arabia)	3–1	(Kuwait) Al-Arabi Sporting Club
Al-Thunayan 34'; Mubarak 63'; Al-Takhifi 66'	Report	Al-Mutawa 61'

Prince Faisal bin Fahd Sports City Stadium, Riyadh
Attendance: 45,000
Referee: Matar Al-Maloud (Bahrain)

Al-Hilal and Al-Arabi Sports Club advanced to the second round.

=== Group 4 ===
==== Participants ====
- (Iran) Malavan
- (Maldives) Victory
- (Pakistan) Habib Bank
- (Sri Lanka) Saunders

All matches were played in Colombo, Sri Lanka.

Pos	Team	Pld	W	D	L	GF	GA	GD	Pts	Qualification
1	(Iran) Malavan	3	2	1	0	20	1	+19	5	Advance to Second round
2	(Sri Lanka) Saunders (H)	0	N/A	N/A	N/A	N/A	N/A	—	0	Advance to Second round
3	(Pakistan) Habib Bank	3	0	1	2	3	11	−8	1	
4	(Maldives) Victory	0	N/A	N/A	N/A	N/A	N/A	—	0	

Source: RSSSF
(H) Hosts
20 August 1986

Malavan (Iran)	7–0	(Pakistan) Habib Bank
Ghayeghran (?); Ahmadzadeh (?); Ghanbarnejad (?); Espandar (?); Mohammadian (?)	Report

Sugathadasa Stadium, Colombo
21 August 1986

Malavan (Iran)	1–1	(Sri Lanka) Saunders
Ghayeghran (?)	Report

Sugathadasa Stadium, Colombo
22 August 1986

Malavan (Iran)	12–0	(Maldives) Victory
Ghayeghran (?); Ahmadzadeh (?); Espandar (?); Mohammadian (?); Delkhosh (?); Ghanbarnejad (?)	Report

Sugathadasa Stadium, Colombo
August 1986

Saunders (Sri Lanka)	2–1	(Pakistan) Habib Bank

Sugathadasa Stadium, Colombo
August 1986

Habib Bank (Pakistan)	2–2	(Maldives) Victory

Sugathadasa Stadium, Colombo
August 1986

Saunders (Sri Lanka)	N/A	(Maldives) Victory

Sugathadasa Stadium, Colombo

Malavan advanced to the second round.

=== Group 5 ===
==== Participants ====
- Daerah Brunei
- (Indonesia) Krama Yudha Tiga Berlian
- (Philippines) Philippine Air Force

All matches were played in Bandar Seri Begawan, Brunei.

Pos	Team	Pld	W	D	L	GF	GA	GD	Pts	Qualification
1	(Indonesia) Krama Yudha Tiga Berlian	2	2	0	0	4	1	+3	4	Advance to Second round
2	(Philippines) Philippine Air Force	2	1	0	1	1	1	0	2	
3	Daerah Brunei (H)	2	0	0	2	1	4	−3	0	

Source: RSSSF
(H) Hosts
1 August 1986

Daerah Brunei	0–1	(Philippines) Philippine Air Force

Hassanal Bolkiah National Stadium, Bandar Seri Begawan

3 August 1986

Krama Yudha Tiga Berlian (Indonesia)	1–0	(Philippines) Philippine Air Force
Kiswanto (?)

Hassanal Bolkiah National Stadium, Bandar Seri Begawan

5 August 1986

Daerah Brunei	1–3	(Indonesia) Krama Yudha Tiga Berlian
Kassim 75'		Tobing 5', 59'; Nere 25'

Hassanal Bolkiah National Stadium, Bandar Seri Begawan

Krama Yudha Tiga Berlian advanced to the second round.

=== Group 6 ===
Both matches were played in Kuala Lumpur, Malaysia by mutual agreement.

Team 1	Agg.	Team 2	1st leg	2nd leg
Selangor (Malaysia)	2–0	Port Authority of Thailand	2–0	0–0

17 August 1986

Selangor (Malaysia)	2–0	Port Authority of Thailand

Stadium Merdeka, Kuala Lumpur

20 August 1986

Port Authority of Thailand	0–0	(Malaysia) Selangor

Stadium Merdeka, Kuala Lumpur

Selangor advanced to the second round.

=== Group 7 ===
==== Participants ====
- (China) Liaoning
- (Japan) Furukawa Electric
- (North Korea) April 25

Team 1	Agg.	Team 2	1st leg	2nd leg
April 25 (North Korea)	0–1	(China) Liaoning	0–0	0–1
Furukawa Electric (Japan)	Bye			

Liaoning and Furukawa Electric advanced to the second round.

=== Group 8 ===
==== Participants ====
- (Hong Kong) South China
- (Macau) Hap Kuan
- (South Korea) Lucky-Goldstar Hwangso

All matches were played in Hong Kong.

Pos	Team	Pld	W	D	L	GF	GA	GD	Pts	Qualification
1	(Macau) Hap Kuan (H)	2	1	0	1	3	1	+2	2	Advance to Second round
2	(Hong Kong) South China	1	1	0	0	1	0	+1	2	Advance to Second round
3	(South Korea) Lucky-Goldstar Hwangso	1	0	0	1	0	3	−3	0	Withdrew (Note: Lucky-Goldstar Hwangso withdrew on the morning of their match against Hap Kuan due to visa and logistical issues. Therefore, the remaining match between Lucky-Goldstar Hwangso and South China was cancelled.)

Source: RSSSF
(H) Hosts
Notes:

South China (Hong Kong)	1–0	(Macau) Hap Kuan

Government Stadium, Hong Kong

Lucky-Goldstar Hwangso (South Korea)	0–3 Awarded	(Macau) Hap Kuan

Government Stadium, Hong Kong

Hap Kuan and South China advanced to the second round.

== Second round ==
=== Group A ===
All matches were played in Baghdad, Iraq.

Pos	Team	Pld	W	D	L	GF	GA	GD	Pts	Qualification
1	(Iraq) Al-Talaba (H)	2	2	0	0	6	0	+6	4	Qualify for final tournament
2	(Qatar) Al-Arabi	2	1	0	1	9	2	+7	2	
3	(Sri Lanka) Saunders	2	0	0	2	0	13	−13	0	

Source: RSSSF
(H) Hosts
19 October 1986

Al-Talaba (Iraq)	4–0	(Sri Lanka) Saunders
Saeed (?); Ruwaid (?)	Report

21 October 1986

Al-Talaba (Iraq)	2–0	(Qatar) Al-Arabi
Saeed (?); Ruwaid (?)	Report

23 October 1986

Al-Arabi (Qatar)	9–0	(Sri Lanka) Saunders

Al-Talaba qualified for the final tournament.

=== Group B ===
All matches were played in Saudi Arabia.

Pos	Team	Pld	W	D	L	GF	GA	GD	Pts	Qualification
1	(Saudi Arabia) Al-Hilal (H)	2	2	0	0	7	0	+7	4	Qualify for final tournament
2	(South Yemen) Al-Shorta Aden	2	0	0	2	0	7	−7	0	
3	(Iran) Malavan	0	0	0	0	0	0	0	0	Withdrew

Source: RSSSF
(H) Hosts
25 October 1986

Al-Shorta Aden (South Yemen)	0–2	(Saudi Arabia) Al-Hilal
	Report	Al-Hammad 64', 89'

Youth Welfare Stadium in Al-Malaz, Riyadh
28 October 1986

Al-Hilal (Saudi Arabia)	5–0	(South Yemen) Al-Shorta Aden
Mubarak 5'; Al-Hammad 6', 69'; Jazea 11'; Bashir 35'	Report

Youth Welfare Stadium in Al-Malaz, Riyadh

Al-Hilal qualified for the final tournament.

=== Group C ===
All matches were played in Hong Kong.

Pos	Team	Pld	W	D	L	GF	GA	GD	Pts	Qualification
1	(China) Liaoning	2	1	1	0	1	0	+1	3	Qualify for final tournament
2	(Indonesia) Krama Yudha Tiga Berlian	2	0	2	0	1	1	0	2	
3	(Hong Kong) South China (H)	2	0	1	1	0	1	−1	1	

Source: RSSSF
(H) Hosts
11 November 1986

South China (Hong Kong)	1–1	(Indonesia) Krama Yudha Tiga Berlian
Cronin 35'		Sunarto 26'

Government Stadium, Hong Kong

13 November 1986

Liaoning (China)	0–0	(Indonesia) Krama Yudha Tiga Berlian

Government Stadium, Hong Kong

16 November 1986

South China (Hong Kong)	0–1	(China) Liaoning
	Report	Wang Hongli 75'

Government Stadium, Hong Kong

Liaoning qualified for the final tournament.

=== Group D ===
All matches were played in Kuala Lumpur, Malaysia.

Pos	Team	Pld	W	D	L	GF	GA	GD	Pts	Qualification
1	(Japan) Furukawa Electric	2	2	0	0	5	2	+3	4	Qualify for final tournament
2	(Malaysia) Selangor (H)	2	1	0	1	6	2	+4	2	
3	(Macau) Hap Kuan	2	0	0	2	1	8	−7	0	

Source: RSSSF
(H) Hosts
7 December 1986

Furukawa Electric (Japan)	2–1	(Malaysia) Selangor

Stadium Merdeka, Kuala Lumpur

9 December 1986

Furukawa Electric (Japan)	3–1	(Macau) Hap Kuan

Stadium Merdeka, Kuala Lumpur

December 1986

Selangor (Malaysia)	5–0	(Macau) Hap Kuan

Stadium Merdeka, Kuala Lumpur

Furukawa Electric qualified for the final tournament.

== Final round ==
All matches were played in Riyadh, Saudi Arabia.

Pos	Team	Pld	W	D	L	GF	GA	GD	Pts	Qualification
1	(Japan) Furukawa Electric	3	3	0	0	7	3	+4	6	Champions
2	(Saudi Arabia) Al-Hilal (H)	3	2	0	1	7	6	+1	4	
3	(China) Liaoning F.C.	3	0	1	2	3	5	−2	1	
4	(Iraq) Al-Talaba	3	0	1	2	3	6	−3	1	

Source: RSSSF
(H) Hosts
26 December 1986

Al-Talaba (Iraq)	2–2	(China) Liaoning F.C.
? 3'		Wang Jun 18'; Ma Lin

Prince Faisal bin Fahd Sports City Stadium, Riyadh
26 December 1986

Al-Hilal (Saudi Arabia)	3–4	(Japan) Furukawa Electric

Prince Faisal bin Fahd Sports City Stadium, Riyadh

28 December 1986

Furukawa Electric (Japan)	2–0	(Iraq) Al-Talaba

Prince Faisal bin Fahd Sports City Stadium, Riyadh
28 December 1986

Al-Hilal (Saudi Arabia)	2–1	(China) Liaoning F.C.
? 35' ? 68'	Report	Ma Lin 70'

Prince Faisal bin Fahd Sports City Stadium, Riyadh

30 December 1986

Furukawa Electric (Japan)	1–0	(China) Liaoning F.C.

Prince Faisal bin Fahd Sports City Stadium, Riyadh
30 December 1986

Al-Hilal (Saudi Arabia)	2–1	(Iraq) Al-Talaba

Prince Faisal bin Fahd Sports City Stadium, Riyadh
