= Krama Yudha Tiga Berlian =

Indonesian football club

- Full name: Krama Yudha Tiga Berlian Palembang
- Nickname: KTB
- Founded: 1984
- Dissolved: 1991
- Ground: Patra Jaya Stadium; Palembang
- Capacity: 10,000
- Owner: PT Krama Yudha Tiga Berlian Motors
- Chairman: Sjarnoebi Said
- 1991–92: Galatama, 19th (disqualified)

Krama Yudha Tiga Berlian or KTB Palembang was an Indonesian semi-professional association football club from Palembang, South Sumatra. The club was owned by the Palembang branch of Krama Yudha Tiga Berlian Motors, the local distributor of Mitsubishi Motors and Mitsubishi Fuso vehicles.

== History ==
Abdul Kadir coached the Krama Yudha Tiga Berlian and helped them finish third in the 1985–86 Asian Club Championship. When Krama Yudha Tiga Berlian joined in Group A along with Al-Ahli and East Bengal, Krama Yudha Tiga Berlian finished second in the group stage to ensure qualification for the semi-final. In the semi-final, Krama Yudha Tiga Berlian lost 3–0 to the Daewoo Royals. In the third place playoff match, Krama Yudha defeated Al-Ittihad 1–0. The club dissolved in 1991 due to financial difficulties.

The namesake company was split in 2017 where sales and production of Mitsubishi passenger cars were spun off to a new company, Mitsubishi Motors Krama Yudha Indonesia, leaving PT Krama Yudha Tiga Berlian with sales and production of Mitsubishi Fuso trucks.

== Honours ==
=== Domestic ===
- Galatama
  - Champions: 1985, 1986–87
  - Runners-up: 1990
- Piala Liga
  - Winners: 1987, 1988, 1989

=== Continental ===
- Asian Club Championship
  - Third-place: 1985–86

=== International ===
- ASEAN Champions' Cup
  - Runners-up (1): 1985

== Performance in AFF competitions ==
Season	Competition	Round	Nat	Club	Home	Away
1985–86	ASEAN Champions' Cup	Group stage	(Singapore)	Tiong Bahru	5–0	
1985–86	ASEAN Champions' Cup	Group stage	(Brunei)	Royal Brunei Armed Forces	7–0	
1985–86	ASEAN Champions' Cup	Group stage	(Thailand)	Bangkok Bank	1–1	
1985–86	ASEAN Champions' Cup	Group stage	(Malaysia)	Malacca	2–0	
1985–86	ASEAN Champions' Cup	Final	(Thailand)	Bangkok Bank	0–1	

== Performance in AFC competitions ==
Season	Competition	Round	Nat	Club	Home	Away
1985–86	Asian Club Championship	Group A	(India)	East Bengal	2–0	
1985–86	Asian Club Championship	Group A	(Saudi Arabia)	Al-Ahli Jeddah	0–1	
1985–86	Asian Club Championship	Semi-finals	(South Korea)	Daewoo Royals	0–3	
1985–86	Asian Club Championship	Third place play-off	(Syria)	Al-Ittihad Aleppo	1–0	
1986	Asian Club Championship	Group stage	(China)	Liaoning	0–0	
1986	Asian Club Championship	Group stage	(Hong Kong)	South China	1–1	
1987	Asian Club Championship	Qualifying round Group 4	(Brunei)	Kota Ranger FC	5–1	
1987	Asian Club Championship	Qualifying round Group 4	(Singapore)	Tiong Bahru CSC	3–0	
1987	Asian Club Championship	Qualifying round Group 4	(Malaysia)	Federal Territory	0–2	
1990–91	Asian Cup Winners' Cup	First round	(Singapore)	Geylang	1–1	2–2

== Notable players ==
- (Indonesia) Bambang Nurdiansyah
- (Indonesia) Herry Kiswanto
- (Indonesia) Rully Nere
- (Indonesia) Zulkarnain Lubis
