= 1985–86 Asian Club Championship =

Asian premier club football tournament

Tournament details
- Host country: Saudi Arabia
- Dates: 19 – 29 January 1986 (final round)
- Teams: 6 (final tournament)
- Venue: 1

Final positions
- Champions: (South Korea) Daewoo Royals (1st title)
- Runners-up: (Saudi Arabia) Al-Ahli
- Third place: (Indonesia) Krama Yudha Tiga Berlian
- Fourth place: (Syria) Al-Ittihad Aleppo

Tournament statistics
- Matches played: 10
- Goals scored: 23 (2.3 per match)

The 1985–86 Asian Club Championship was the fifth edition of the annual Asian club football competition hosted by the Asian Football Confederation, and was the first such tournament in 14 years. Several clubs played in the qualifying round in the fall of 1985, with the final tournament being held in Jeddah, Saudi Arabia, from 19 January to 29 January 1986.

== Teams ==
Location of the 1985–86 Asian Club Championship teams
Red: Group A; Blue: Group B; Yellow: Qualifying tournament

== Qualifiers ==
=== West Asia 1 ===
==== Participants ====
- (Iraq) Al-Rasheed
- (Jordan) Amman Club
- (Syria) Al-Ittihad Aleppo

Note: (Yemen Arab Republic) Al-Ahli Sana'a and (South Yemen) Al-Shorta Aden both withdrew before the draw, while Lebanon did not send a team.

==== Round 1 ====
Team 1	Score	Team 2
Al-Rasheed (Iraq)	4–0	(Jordan) Amman Club
Al-Ittihad Aleppo (Syria)	Bye	

==== Round 2 ====
Team 1	Score	Team 2
Al-Ittihad Aleppo (Syria)	w/o	(Iraq) Al-Rasheed

Al-Ittihad Aleppo qualified for the 1985–86 Asian Club Championship after Al-Rasheed withdrew from the tournament.

=== West Asia 2 ===
==== Participants ====
- (Bahrain) Al-Muharraq
- (Kuwait) Al-Arabi
- (Oman) Fanja
- (Qatar) Al-Rayyan
- (Saudi Arabia) Al-Ahli Jeddah
- (United Arab Emirates) Al Ain

==== Final ====
Team 1	Score	Team 2
Al-Ahli Jeddah (Saudi Arabia)	2–1	(Kuwait) Al-Arabi

22 February 1985

Al-Ahli Jeddah (Saudi Arabia)	2–1	(Kuwait) Al-Arabi

Zabeel Stadium, Dubai

Al-Ahli Jeddah and Al-Arabi qualified for the final tournament, but Al-Arabi later withdrew.

=== Central Asia ===
Played in Colombo, Sri Lanka. The tournament was called the Coca-Cola Cup due to sponsorship reasons. It was the qualifier for the 1985–86 Asian Club Championship for clubs of Central and South Asian countries.

Pos	Team	Pld	W	D	L	GF	GA	GD	Pts	Qualification
1	(India) East Bengal	5	5	0	0	20	0	+20	10	Qualified for 1985–86 Asian Club Championship
2	(Bangladesh) Abahani Krira Chakra	5	4	0	1	17	4	+13	8	
3	(Sri Lanka) Saunders (H)	5	2	1	2	12	8	+4	5	
4	(Pakistan) PIA	5	1	2	2	8	8	0	4	
5	(Nepal) New Road Team	5	1	1	3	8	11	−3	3	
6	(Maldives) Club Valencia	5	0	0	5	2	36	−34	0	

Source: Champions' Cup 1985/86
(H) Hosts

Note: Afghanistan and Iran did not send a team.

=== Southeast Asia ===
All matches played in Indonesia.

Pos	Team	Pld	W	D	L	GF	GA	GD	Pts	Qualification
1	(Indonesia) Krama Yudha Tiga Berlian (H)	4	3	1	0	15	1	+14	7	Qualified for 1985–86 Asian Club Championship
2	(Thailand) Bangkok Bank	4	3	1	0	10	2	+8	7	Qualified for 1985–86 Asian Club Championship
3	(Singapore) Tiong Bahru	4	1	1	2	2	7	−5	3	
4	(Malaysia) Malacca FA	4	1	1	2	2	7	−5	3	
5	Royal Brunei Armed Forces Sports Council	4	0	0	4	0	12	−12	0	

Source: Champions' Cup 1985/86
(H) Hosts

Note: (Myanmar) Burma and Philippines did not send a team.

==== Final ====
Team 1	Score	Team 2
Bangkok Bank (Thailand)	1–0	(Indonesia) Krama Yudha Tiga Berlian

21 December 1985

Krama Yudha Tiga Berlian (Indonesia)	0–1	(Thailand) Bangkok Bank
		Suksawat 54'

Gelora Senayan Main Stadium, Jakarta

Bangkok Bank qualified for the final tournament. Krama Yudha Tiga Berlian also later qualified for the final tournament following Seiko's withdrawal from the competition.

=== East Asia 1 ===
Pos	Team	Pld	W	D	L	GF	GA	GD	Pts	Qualification
1	(Hong Kong) Seiko (H)	4	3	0	1	6	6	0	6	Qualified for 1985–86 Asian Club Championship
2	(North Korea) April 25	4	2	1	1	8	4	+4	5	
3	(China) Liaoning	4	0	1	3	2	6	−4	1	

Source: Champions' Cup 1985/86
(H) Hosts
5 May 1985

Seiko (Hong Kong)	2–1	(China) Liaoning

Government Stadium, Hong Kong
Attendance: 15,081

26 May 1985

Liaoning (China)	0–1	(Hong Kong) Seiko

Shenyang People's Stadium, Shenyang
Attendance: 17,000

2 June 1985

April 25 (North Korea)	4–1	(Hong Kong) Seiko

Kim Il Sung Stadium, Pyongyang

9 June 1985

April 25 (North Korea)	3–1	(China) Liaoning

Nampo Stadium, Nampo

Liaoning (China)	0–0	(North Korea) April 25

Shenyang People's Stadium, Shenyang

1 Sep 1985

Seiko (Hong Kong)	2–1	(North Korea) April 25

Government Stadium, Hong Kong
Attendance: 25,897

Seiko qualified, but later withdrew and folded.

=== East Asia 2 ===
Participants:

- (South Korea) Daewoo Royals
- (Macau) Wa Seng

Note: (Japan) Yomiuri withdrew before the draw.

Both legs were played in South Korea as Macau did not have an AFC or FIFA-standard stadium.

Team 1	Agg.	Team 2	1st leg	2nd leg
Daewoo Royals (South Korea)	14–1	(Macau) Wa Seng	9–0	5–1

9 November 1985

Daewoo Royals (South Korea)	9–0	(Macau) Wa Seng
Lee Tae-ho (?); Chung Hae-won (?); Kim Hak-su (?); Cho Kwang-rae (?); Hyeon Ki-ho (?); Park Chang-sun (?)

Busan Gudeok Stadium, Busan

11 November 1985

Daewoo Royals (South Korea)	5–1	(Macau) Wa Seng
Chung Yong-hwan (?); Byun Byung-joo (?); ? (?)		? (?)

Busan Gudeok Stadium, Busan

Daewoo Royals won 14–1 on aggregate and qualified for the final tournament.

== Group stage ==
Note: As Seiko withdrew from the final tournament and folded, Southeast Asian runners up Krama Yudha Tiga Berlian took their place.

All matches were played in Jeddah, Saudi Arabia.

=== Group A ===
Pos	Team	Pld	W	D	L	GF	GA	GD	Pts	Qualification
1	(Saudi Arabia) Al-Ahli Jeddah (H)	2	2	0	0	3	1	+2	4	Advance to knockout stage
2	(Indonesia) Krama Yudha Tiga Berlian	2	1	0	1	2	1	+1	2	Advance to knockout stage
3	(India) East Bengal	2	0	0	2	1	4	−3	0	

Source: Champions' Cup 1985/86
(H) Hosts
19 January 1986

Al-Ahli Jeddah (Saudi Arabia)	2–1	(India) East Bengal
Abu Rass 38', 88'		Roy 33'

Prince Abdullah Al-Faisal Stadium, Jeddah

21 January 1986

Krama Yudha Tiga Berlian (Indonesia)	2–0	(India) East Bengal
Nurdiansyah 65'; Tobing 74'

Prince Abdullah Al-Faisal Stadium, Jeddah

23 January 1986

Al-Ahli Jeddah (Saudi Arabia)	1–0	(Indonesia) Krama Yudha Tiga Berlian
Dabu 4'

Prince Abdullah Al-Faisal Stadium, Jeddah

=== Group B ===
Pos	Team	Pld	W	D	L	GF	GA	GD	Pts	Qualification
1	(South Korea) Daewoo Royals	2	2	0	0	4	1	+3	4	Advance to knockout stage
2	(Syria) Al-Ittihad Aleppo	2	1	0	1	3	1	+2	2	Advance to knockout stage
3	(Thailand) Bangkok Bank	2	0	0	2	1	6	−5	0	

Source: Champions' Cup 1985/86
20 January 1986

Daewoo Royals (South Korea)	3–1	(Thailand) Bangkok Bank
Lee Tae-ho 31', 46'; Chung Hae-won 31'		Kongsri 78'

Prince Abdullah Al-Faisal Stadium, Jeddah

22 January 1986

Al-Ittihad Aleppo (Syria)	3–0	(Thailand) Bangkok Bank

Prince Abdullah Al-Faisal Stadium, Jeddah

24 January 1986

Daewoo Royals (South Korea)	1–0	(Syria) Al-Ittihad Aleppo

Prince Abdullah Al-Faisal Stadium, Jeddah

== Knockout stage ==
=== Bracket ===
Semi-finals
26 January – Jeddah
(South Korea) Daewoo Royals	3
(Indonesia) Krama Yudha Tiga Berlian	0
26 January – Jeddah
(Saudi Arabia) Al-Ahli Jeddah	1
(Syria) Al-Ittihad Aleppo	0

Final
29 January – Jeddah
(South Korea) Daewoo Royals (a.e.t.)	3
(Saudi Arabia) Al-Ahli Jeddah	1
Third place play-off
28 January – Jeddah
(Indonesia) Krama Yudha Tiga Berlian	1
(Syria) Al-Ittihad Aleppo	0

=== Semi-finals ===
26 January 1986

Daewoo Royals (South Korea)	3–0	(Indonesia) Krama Yudha Tiga Berlian
Chung Hae-won 27'; Byun Byung-joo 37'; Kang Shin-woo 43'

Prince Abdullah Al-Faisal Stadium, Jeddah

26 January 1986

Al-Ahli Jeddah (Saudi Arabia)	1–0	(Syria) Al-Ittihad Aleppo
Abu Dawoud (?)

Prince Abdullah Al-Faisal Stadium, Jeddah

=== Third place match ===
28 January 1986

Krama Yudha Tiga Berlian (Indonesia)	1–0	(Syria) Al-Ittihad Aleppo
Tobing 70'

Prince Abdullah Al-Faisal Stadium, Jeddah

=== Final ===
29 January 1986

Daewoo Royals (South Korea)	3–1 (a.e.t.)	(Saudi Arabia) Al-Ahli Jeddah
Byun Byung-joo 75'; Park Yang-ha 98'; Kang Shin-woo 100'		Dabu 16'

Prince Abdullah Al-Faisal Stadium, Jeddah
