= 2010 Sisaket F.C. season =

Sisaket
2010 season
- Chairman: Thaned Kruea-rat
- Manager: Somchad Yimsiri
- Thai Premier League: 14th
- FA Cup: Quarter-final
Home colours	Away colours

The 2010 season was Sisaket's 1st season in the top division of Thai football after promotion from the 1st division. This article shows statistics of the club's players in the season, and also lists all matches that the club played in the season.

== Chronological list of events ==
- 10 November 2009: The Thai Premier League 2010 season first leg fixtures were announced.
- 20 October 2010: Sisaket were relegated from the Thai Premier League after their 1st season in the Premier League.
- 24 October 2010: Sisaket finished in 14th place in the Thai Premier League.

== Players ==
=== First team squad ===
As of July 31, 2010 Note: Flags indicate national team as defined under FIFA eligibility rules; some limited exceptions apply. Players may hold more than one non-FIFA nationality.

No.	Pos.	Nation	Player
1	GK	THA	Kritsada Krajardthong
4	MF	THA	Suphan Hardkam
6	DF	THA	Pralong Sawandee
7	MF	THA	Anuwat Nuchit
8	MF	THA	Tehwa Sritammanusarn
9	FW	THA	Tadpong Lar-Tham
10	FW	THA	Piroj Anantanarong (captain)
11	DF	THA	Prachya Hong-In
13	FW	THA	Piyawat Thongman
14	DF	THA	Praison Huntaweechai
15	DF	THA	Piyanat Pohpar
16	MF	THA	Jakkapan Prommaros
17	DF	THA	Ekkapan Jandakorn (vice captain)
19	FW	THA	David Srangnanaok
20	DF	THA	Chaowanut Butdee

No.	Pos.	Nation	Player
21	MF	THA	Pongoitak Keawsombat
22	MF	BRA	Víctor Amaro
23	DF	CMR	Divine Ngenevu
25	GK	THA	Chatchai Thengcharoen
26	FW	CIV	Koné Adama
27	MF	THA	Assawin Boonman
28	DF	THA	Koset Kerdsuk
30	FW	THA	Kraisorn Silakam
31	FW	THA	Kittisak Jaihan
33	GK	THA	Watcharapong Klahan
36	MF	THA	Sirisak Sangsomwong
37	MF	KOR	Kim Youn-Dong
38	FW	THA	Wuttichai Tathong
39	MF	THA	Hatthaporn Suwan
40	GK	CMR	Ruben

=== 2010 Season transfers ===
In

Note: Flags indicate national team as defined under FIFA eligibility rules; some limited exceptions apply. Players may hold more than one non-FIFA nationality.

No.	Pos.	Nation	Player
—	DF	THA	Prayad Boonya (Transferred from Nakhon Pathom)
—	DF	THA	Nakarin Fuplook (Transferred from Thai Port FC)
—	FW	THA	Piyawat Thongman (Transferred from Surat Thani FC)
—	MF	THA	Watcharapong Samarnthong (Transferred from TOT FC)

Out

Note: Flags indicate national team as defined under FIFA eligibility rules; some limited exceptions apply. Players may hold more than one non-FIFA nationality.

No.	Pos.	Nation	Player
—	MF	THA	Natthawut Khingpila (Transferred from Samut Sakhon FC)
—	DF	THA	Jeerawat Thongluae (Transferred from Samut Sakhon FC)

== Results ==
=== Thai Premier League ===
20 March 2010	Sisaket	1 - 2	Muangthong United	Sisaket
16.30 UTC+7	Piyawat 64'			Stadium: Sri Nakhon Lamduan Stadium

28 March 2010	Royal Thai Army	2 - 2	Sisaket	Bangkok
18.00 UTC+7	Jakkraphong 45'; Tatree 49'		Valci Júnior 72'; Piyawat 89'	Stadium: Thai Army Sports Stadium; Referee: Sura Sriart

3 April 2010	Sisaket	1 - 1	TOT-CAT	Sisaket
				Stadium: Sri Nakhon Lamduan Stadium

10 April 2010	Rajnavy Rayong	4 - 3	Sisaket	Rayong
				Stadium: Rayong Stadium; Referee: Thaweep Inkaew

18 April 2010	Chonburi	3 – 1	Sisaket	Chonburi
18:00 UTC+7	Pipob 48', 59'; Arthit 55'		Y.D. Kim 61'	Stadium: IPE Chonburi Stadium; Attendance: 9,121; Referee: Prathan Nasawang

25 April 2010	Sisaket	2 - 4	Police United	Sisaket
				Stadium: Sri Nakhon Lamduan Stadium

2 May 2010	Thai Port	2 - 0	Sisaket	Bangkok
				Stadium: Leo Stadium; Referee: Prathan Nasawang

9 May 2010	Sisaket	1 - 1	Samut Songkhram	Sisaket
	Gilson Días 87'		Panuwat Y. 13'	Stadium: Sri Nakhon Lamduan Stadium; Referee: Porrached Wongkamdee

16 May 2010	Bangkok Glass	3 - 1	Sisaket	Thanyaburi
				Stadium: Leo Stadium; Referee: Sura Sriart

6 June 2010	Sisaket	0 - 0	Osotspa Saraburi	Sisaket
				Stadium: Sri Nakhon Lamduan Stadium

13 June 2010	Buriram PEA	1 - 0	Sisaket	Buriram
	Pralong 70' (o.g.)			Stadium: i-mobile Stadium; Referee: Sura Sriart

20 June 2010	Sisaket	1 - 0	BEC Tero Sasana	Sisaket
	Tehwa 77'			Stadium: Sri Nakhon Lamduan Stadium; Referee: Porached Wongkamdee

27 June 2010	TTM Phichit	0 - 0	Sisaket	Phichit
				Stadium: Phichit Stadium

14 July 2010	Bangkok United	0 - 1	Sisaket	Bangkok
				Stadium: Thai-Japanese Stadium; Referee: Porached Wongkamdee

18 July 2010	Muangthong United	6 - 0	Sisaket	Nonthaburi
				Stadium: Yamaha Stadium (Thailand)

24 July 2010	Sisaket	0 - 1	Royal Thai Army	Sisaket
			Tatree 90+2'	Stadium: Sri Nakhon Lamduan Stadium; Referee: Chaiya Mahapab

28 July 2010	TOT-CAT	3 - 2	Sisaket	Nonthaburi
				Stadium: Yamaha Stadium; Referee: Atthakorn Wetchakan

7 August 2010	Sisaket	4 - 1	Rajnavy Rayong	Sisaket
				Stadium: Sri Nakhon Lamduan Stadium; Referee: Sakda Pansut

14 August 2010	Sisaket	0 - 1	Chonburi	Sisaket
				Stadium: Sri Nakhon Lamduan Stadium

18 August 2010	Police United	0 - 1	Sisaket	Pathumthani
				Stadium: Thammasat Stadium

22 August 2010	Sisaket	1 - 1	Thai Port	Sisaket
	Piroj 44'		Sompong 57'	Stadium: Sri Nakhon Lamduan Stadium; Referee: Sura Sriart

11 September 2010	Sisaket	1 - 2	Bangkok Glass	Sisaket
				Stadium: Sri Nakhon Lamduan Stadium

19 September 2010	Sisaket	1 - 1	Bangkok United	Sisaket
				Stadium: Sri Nakhon Lamduan Stadium

25 September 2010	Osotspa Saraburi	6 - 3	Sisaket	Saraburi
16.30 UTC+7	Kabfah 23'; Apipoo 28'		Piyawat 15'	Stadium: Saraburi Stadium; Referee: Sakda Pansut

2 October 2010	BEC Tero Sasana	2 - 3	Sisaket	Bangkok
18.00 UTC+7				Stadium: Thephasadin Stadium

10 October 2010	Samut Songkhram	1 - 0	Sisaket	Samut Songkhram
16.30 UTC+7				Stadium: Samut Songkhram Stadium; Referee: Chaiya Mahaprab

17 October 2010	Sisaket	4 - 0	TTM Phichit	Sisaket
15.30 UTC+7				Stadium: Sri Nakhon Lamduan Stadium; Referee: Sura Sriart

20 October 2010	Sisaket	0 - 3	Buriram PEA	Sisaket
15.30 UTC+7				Stadium: Sri Nakhon Lamduan Stadium; Referee: Surapol Sawangjit

==== League table ====
Pos	Team	Pld	W	D	L	GF	GA	GD	Pts	Qualification or relegation
12	TOT-CAT	30	9	6	15	23	42	−19	33	
13	TTM Phichit	30	7	11	12	32	46	−14	32	
14	Sisaket	30	6	8	16	36	54	−18	26	Promotion/relegation play-off
15	Bangkok United (R)	30	5	9	16	25	52	−27	24	Promotion/relegation play-off
16	Royal Thai Army	30	5	7	18	27	54	−27	22	Promotion/relegation play-off

Updated to match(es) played on 24 October 2010. Source: FIFA.com
Rules for classification: 1st points; 2nd head-to-head; 3rd match win; 4th goal difference; 5th number of goals scored
(R) Relegated

=== FA Cup ===
==== Third round ====
30 June 2010	Chula United	1 - 1 (5 - 6 p.)	Sisaket	Bangkok
				Stadium: Chulalongkorn University Sports Stadium

==== Fourth round ====
7 September 2010	Sisaket	3 - 0	TTM Phichit	Sisaket
				Stadium: Sri Nakhon Lamduan Stadium

==== Quarter-final ====
15 September 2010	Rajnavy Rayong	2 - 1	Sisaket	Rayong
				Stadium: Rayong Stadium

=== League Cup ===
==== First round ====
===== 1st leg =====
29 August 2010	Tak	0 - 2	Sisaket	Tak
				Stadium: Tak Stadium

===== 2nd leg =====
1 September 2010	Sisaket	3 - 0	Tak	Sisaket
				Stadium: Sri Nakhon Lamduan Stadium

==== Second round ====
===== 1st leg =====
8 September 2010	Nakhon Phanom	2 - 2	Sisaket	Nakhon Phanom
				Stadium: Nakhon Phanom Stadium

===== 2nd leg =====
22 September 2010	Sisaket	8 - 3	Nakhon Phanom	Sisaket
				Stadium: Sri Nakhon Lamduan Stadium
