= 2010 in Thai football =

Football in Thailand
- Season: 2010

The 2010 season of competitive football in Thailand.

The season will begin on 14 February 2010 for the Regional League Division 2 and 13 March 2010 for the Thai Premier League and Division 1.

== Promotion and relegation (pre-season) ==
Teams promoted to Thai Premier League 2010

- Police United
- Royal Thai Army
- Sisaket

Teams relegated from Thai Premier League 2009

- Sriracha
- Chula United
- Nakhon Pathom

Teams promoted to Thai Division 1 League 2010

- Raj Pracha-Nonthaburi
- Chiangrai United
- Narathiwat

Teams relegated from Thai Division 1 League 2009

- Nakhon Sawan
- Thai Airways-Ban Bueng
- Surat Thani

== Managerial changes ==
Name	Club	Date of departure	Replacement	Date of appointment
Kiatisuk Senamuang	Chonburi	29 October 2009	Jadet Meelarp	8 November 2009
Pongphan Wongsuwan	TOT	23 September 2009	Somchai Subpherm	29 December 2009
Thongsuk Sampahungsith	Buriram PEA	23 September 2009	Pongphan Wongsuwan	November 2009
Somchai Subpherm	Bangkok United	29 December 2009	Worrakon Vijanarong	1 January 2010
Somchai Subpherm	TOT	10 January 2010	Narong Suwannachot	January 2009
Attaphol Buspakom	Muangthong United	19 January 2010	René Desaeyere	19 January 2010

== Diary of the season ==
- 20 February 2010: Muangthong United won the Kor Royal Cup beating Thai Port 2-0 at Suphachalasai Stadium, the match stopped in 81st minute because of the unrest.

== National team ==
=== Friendly matches ===
16 May 2010
15:30 UTC+2

South Africa	4–0	Thailand
Tshabalala 22'; Mphela 30', 33'; Parker 89'

Mbombela Stadium, Nelspruit
Attendance: 30,000
Referee: (Kenya) Langat Kipngetich
4 September 2010
UTC+7

Thailand	1–0	India
Sarayoot 72'

SCG Stadium, Nonthaburi, Thailand

=== King's Cup ===
17 January 2010
18:30 UTC+7

Thailand	1 – 0	Singapore
Sutee 59'

80th Birthday Anniversary Stadium
Attendance: 20,000

20 January 2010
18:30 UTC+7

Poland	3 – 1	Thailand
Glik 43'; Małecki 52'; Robak 87'		Therdsak 90' (pen.)

80th Birthday Anniversary Stadium
Attendance: 20,000

23 January 2010
18:45 UTC+7

Thailand	0 – 3	Denmark
		Lekic 19'; Absalonsen 37'; Bernburg 86'

80th Birthday Anniversary Stadium
Attendance: 20,000

=== Asian Cup qualifiers ===
6 January 2010
19:00 UTC+7

Thailand	0 – 0	Jordan
	Report

Rajamangala Stadium, Bangkok
Attendance: 15,000
Referee: Ben Williams (Australia)

3 March 2010
19:30 UTC+3:30

Iran	1 – 0	Thailand
Nekounam 90'	Report

Azadi Stadium, Tehran
Attendance: 17,000
Referee: Abdullah Balideh (Qatar)

== Deaths ==
- 17 April 2010 – Chanon Wong-arri, 32, Defender who played for PEA, TTM Samut Sakhon, Thai Port, Chula United and TOT-CAT.

== Honours ==
Competition	Winner	Details	Match Report
Thai FA Cup	Chonburi	FA Cup 2010; Beat Muangthong United 2–1	
Queen's Cup	Krung Thai Bank-BG	Queen's Cup 2010; Beat Police United 4–1	Report
Thai Premier League	Muangthong United	Thai Premier League 2010	report
Division 1 League	Sriracha F.C.	Thai Division 1 League 2010	Report
Regional League	Buriram F.C.	Regional League Division 2 2010	
Kor Royal Cup	Muangthong United	Kor Royal Cup 2010; Beat Thai Port 2–0	Report
Super Cup		Super Cup 2010	
