= 2010 Thai Premier League =

Thai Premier League
- Season: 2010
- Champions: Muangthong United
- Relegated: Bangkok United
- 2011 AFC Champions League: Muangthong United
- 2011 AFC Cup: Chonburi
- Matches: 240
- Goals: 620 (2.58 per match)
- Top goalscorer: (Cameroon) Kengne Ludovick (17 goals)
- Biggest home win: Muangthong United 6–0 Sisaket (18 July 2010)
- Biggest away win: TOT-CAT 0–5 BEC Tero Sasana (12 June 2010)
- Highest scoring: Osotspa Saraburi 6–3 Sisaket (25 September 2010) (9 goals)
- Longest unbeaten run: Buriram PEA (18 games) ended 7 August 2010
- Highest attendance: Buriram PEA 1–0 Muangthong United (23,070) (22 August 2010)

The 2010 Thai Premier League was the 14th season of the Thai Premier League since its establishment in 1996. A total of 16 teams competed in the league, with Muangthong United as the defending champions.

== League Expansion ==
It was announced at the end of the season that the TPL would increase the number of teams for the start of the 2011 Thai Premier League season. Therefore, at the end of season the three teams in the Thai Premier League that finished the season in the bottom three places (14th, 15th and 16th) would face the fourth, fifth and sixth teams from Division One in a promotion/relegation series.

The six teams will be divided into two groups of three. They will meet each other in their group on a home-and-away basis with the winner of each group earning spots in the top flight next season.

== Thai Premier League All-Star Exhibition game ==
=== Personnel and sponsoring ===
Team	Sponsor	Kit maker	Team captain	Head coach
Bangkok Glass	Leo Beer	Umbro	(Thailand) Amnaj Kaewkiew	(Brazil) Carlos Roberto de Carvalho
Bangkok United	True	FBT	(Thailand) Patiparn Phetphun	(Thailand) Prapol Pongpanich
BEC Tero Sasana	3K Battery	Nike	(Thailand) Anon Sangsanoi	(England) Peter Butler
Buriram PEA	Chang Beer		(Thailand) Apichet Puttan	(Thailand) Attaphol Buspakom
Chonburi	Chang Beer	FBT	(Thailand) Pipob On-Mo	(Thailand) Jadet Meelarp
Muangthong United	Yamaha	Adidas	(Thailand) Jetsada Jitsawad	(Belgium) René Desaeyere
Osotspa Saraburi	M-150	Grand Sport	(Thailand) Jetsada Puanakunmee	(Thailand) Pairoj Borwonwatanadilok
Pattaya United	Ocean One	Grand Sport	(Thailand) Niweat Siriwong	(Thailand) Thavatchai Dumrong-Ongtrakul
Police United	Insee Cement		(Thailand) Krissadee Prakobkong	(Thailand) Chaiyong Khumpiam
Rajnavy Rayong	PTT	Umbro	(Thailand) Jetsada Ngam-muang	(Thailand) Somsak Aksorn
Royal Thai Army	Acer	Grand Sport	(Thailand) Chaiwat Nark-iam	(Thailand) Amnart Chalermchaowarit
Samut Songkhram	SCG	Kappa	(Thailand) Jirawat Kaewboran	(Thailand) Somchai Chuayboonchum
Sisaket	Muang Thai	Kool Sport	(Thailand) Piroj Anantanarong	(Thailand) Wisoon Wichaya
Thai Port	FB Battery	Adidas	(Thailand) Sarayoot Chaikamdee	(Thailand) Sasom Pobprasert
TOT-CAT	TOT-CAT	Diadora	(Thailand) Theerachai Ngamcharoen	(Thailand) Narong Suwannachot
TTM Phichit	GH Bank	Diadora	(Thailand) Peeratat Phoruendee	(Brazil) Jose Alves Borges

== Teams ==
Sriracha, Chula United and Nakhon Pathom were relegated to the 2010 Thai Division 1 League after finishing the 2009 season in the bottom three places.

The three relegated teams were replaced by 2009 Thai Division 1 League champions Police United, runners-up Royal Thai Army and third place Sisaket.

TTM Samut Sakhon and PEA were renamed to TTM Phichit and Buriram PEA, they moved location to Phichit and Buriram. PEA renamed after the club takeover by Newin Chidchob. TOT were renamed too, they were renamed to TOT-CAT.

=== Stadium and locations ===
Locations of the 2010 Thai Premier League teams
Football clubs in Bangkok Metropolitan Region

Team	Location	Stadium	Capacity	Ref.
Bangkok Glass	Pathumthani	Leo Stadium	7,500	
Bangkok United	Bangkok	Thai-Japanese Stadium^{1}	10,320	
BEC Tero Sasana	Bangkok	Thephasadin Stadium ^{2}	6,378	
Buriram PEA	Buriram	i-mobile Stadium	14,000	
Chonburi	Chonburi	IPE Chonburi Stadium	12,000	
Muangthong United	Nonthaburi	Yamaha Stadium	20,000	
Osotspa M-150 Saraburi	Saraburi	Saraburi Stadium	6,000	
Pattaya United	Chonburi	Nongprue Municipality Football Field	7,000	
Police United	Pathumthani	Thammasat Stadium	25,000	
Rajnavy Rayong	Rayong	Rayong Province Stadium	14,000	
Royal Thai Army	Bangkok	Thai Army Sports Stadium	15,000	
Samut Songkhram	Samut Songkhram	Samut Songkhram Stadium	5,000	
Sisaket	Sisaket	Sri Nakhon Lamduan Stadium	10,000	
Thai Port	Bangkok	PAT Stadium	12,000	
TOT-CAT	Nonthaburi	Yamaha Stadium ^{3}	15,000	
TTM Phichit	Phichit	Phichit Stadium	5,000	

^{1} Second half of season played at Bangkok University Stadium former home in Rangsit
^{2} Moved from Nong Chok Stadium during renovation
^{3} Ground share with Muangthong United during TOT Stadium Chaeng Watthana renovation

=== Managerial changes ===
Team	Outgoing manager	Manner of departure	Date of vacancy	Table	Incoming manager	Date of appointment	Table
Chonburi	(Thailand) Kiatisuk Senamuang	Resigned	29 October 2009	2nd (09)	(Thailand) Jadet Meelarp	8 November 2009	Pre-season
Bangkok United	(Thailand) Somchai Subpherm	Resigned	29 December 2009	Pre-Season	(Thailand) Worrakon Vijanarong	1 January 2010	Pre-Season
TOT-CAT	(Thailand) Pongphan Wongsuwan	Resigned	23 September 2009	Pre-season	(Thailand) Somchai Subpherm	29 December 2009	Pre-season
Buriram PEA	(Thailand) Thongsuk Sampahungsith	Sacked	23 September 2009	Pre-Season	(Thailand) Thanadech Fuprasert	November 2009	Pre-season
TOT-CAT	(Thailand) Somchai Subpherm	Sacked	10 January 2010	Pre-season	(Thailand) Narong Suwannachot	2010	Pre-season
Muangthong United	(Thailand) Attaphol Buspakom	Advanced	19 January 2010	Pre-season	(Belgium) René Desaeyere	19 January 2010	Pre-season
Sisaket	(Brazil) Freddy Marinho	Sacked	28 March 2010	13th	(South Korea) Kim Kyung-Ju	3 April 2010	11th
Rajnavy Rayong	(Thailand) Anan Amornkiat	Resigned	3 April 2010	16th	(Thailand) Somsak Aksorn	6 April 2010	16th
TTM Phichit	(Thailand) Prajuk Viengsong	Sacked	19 April 2010	3rd	(Brazil) Jose Alves Borges	19 April 2010	3rd
Buriram PEA	(Thailand) Thanadech Fuprasert	Sacked	26 May 2010	8th	(Thailand) Attaphol Buspakom	26 May 2010	8th
Bangkok Glass	(Thailand) Surachai Jaturapattarapong	Resigned	8 June 2010	8th	(Brazil) Carlos Roberto de Carvalho	8 June 2010	8th
BEC Tero Sasana	(Thailand) Totchtawan Sripan	Resigned	14 July 2010	11th	(Chile) Enrique Amaya	15 July 2010	11th
Bangkok United	(Thailand) Worrakon Vijanarong	Sacked	18 July 2010	15th	(Thailand) Prapol Pongpanich	3 August 2010	16th
Royal Thai Army	(Thailand) Kwan Rattanarungsee	Sacked	21 September 2010	15th	(Thailand) Amnart Chalermchaowarit	21 September 2010	15th
BEC Tero Sasana	(Chile) Enrique Amaya	Sacked	6 October 2010	10th	(England) Peter Butler	6 October 2010	10th

=== Ownership changes ===
Club	New Owner	Previous Owner	Date
Buriram PEA	Newin Chidchob	Somsak Rattanapol	23 September 2009
TOT-CAT	Piroj Suwannachavee	Wasukree Klapairee	10 January 2010

== League table ==
Pos	Team	Pld	W	D	L	GF	GA	GD	Pts	Qualification or relegation
1	Muangthong United (C, Q)	30	20	7	3	64	19	+45	67	2011 AFC Champions League play-off round
2	Buriram PEA	30	17	12	1	51	19	+32	63	
3	Chonburi (Q)	30	17	9	4	57	28	+29	60	2011 AFC Cup Group stage round (Note: via FA Cup winners)
4	Thai Port	30	13	9	8	41	29	+12	48	
5	Bangkok Glass	30	12	9	9	48	38	+10	45	
6	Pattaya United	30	12	9	9	43	38	+5	45	
7	Osotspa M-150 Saraburi	30	10	12	8	32	30	+2	42	
8	Samut Songkhram	30	11	9	10	27	32	−5	42	
9	BEC Tero Sasana	30	9	8	13	39	42	−3	35	
10	Rajnavy Rayong	30	8	9	13	35	52	−17	33	
11	Police United	30	9	6	15	40	45	−5	33	
12	TOT-CAT	30	9	6	15	23	42	−19	33	
13	TTM Phichit	30	7	11	12	32	46	−14	32	
14	Sisaket	30	6	8	16	36	54	−18	26	Promotion/relegation play-off
15	Bangkok United (R)	30	5	9	16	25	52	−27	24	Promotion/relegation play-off
16	Royal Thai Army	30	5	7	18	27	54	−27	22	Promotion/relegation play-off

Updated to match(es) played on 24 October 2010. Source: FIFA.com
Rules for classification: 1st points; 2nd head-to-head; 3rd match win; 4th goal difference; 5th number of goals scored
(C) Champions; (Q) Qualified for the phase indicated; (R) Relegated

=== Playoffs ===
==== Group A ====
Team	Pld	W	D	L	GF	GA	GD	Pts
Sisaket	4	2	2	0	4	1	+3	8
Nakhon Pathom^{1}	4	2	1	1	5	3	+2	7
Air Force United	4	0	1	3	2	7	−5	1

27 November 2010
17:30 UTC+7

Air Force United	0–0	Sisaket

Thupatemee Stadium, Bangkok
Referee: Sakda Phansut
4 December 2010
15:30 UTC+7

Sisaket	2–0	Nakhon Pathom
Amaro 15'; Piyawat 48'

Sri Nakhon Lamduan Stadium, Sisaket
Referee: Badin Bounduelan
11 December 2010
16:00 UTC+7

Nakhon Pathom	3–0	Air Force United

Kasetsart Kampangsan University Stadium, Nakhon Pathom
Referee: Sumaet Saiwaew
18 December 2010
17:30 UTC+7

Air Force United	1–2	Nakhon Pathom
Kritsana 42'		Nirut 30'; Phuwadol 74'

Thupatemee Stadium, Bangkok
Referee: Surasak Kundiloksirodom
25 December 2010
16:00 UTC+7

Nakhon Pathom	0–0	Sisaket
Chalermsuk (yellow card) 58' (yellow-red card); Thanasith (yellow card) 80' (yellow-red card)		Divine (yellow card) 55' (yellow-red card)

Kasetsart Kampangsan University Stadium, Nakhon Pathom
Referee: Apisit Aonrak
31 December 2010
15:30 UTC+7

Sisaket	2–1	Air Force United
Wuttichai 36'; Y.D.Kim 48'		Yuttana J. 71'

Sri Nakhon Lamduan Stadium, Sisaket
Referee: Sura Sriart

^{1} Nakhon Pathom were suspended for two years following the final playoff game, all results stood.

==== Group B ====
Team	Pld	W	D	L	GF	GA	GD	Pts
Army United (Note: Royal Thai Army renamed to Army United)	4	2	2	0	5	1	+4	8
Bangkok United	4	1	2	1	3	3	0	5
Songkhla	4	0	2	2	2	6	−4	2

Notes:
27 November 2010
18:00 UTC+7

Bangkok United	0–2	Army United
Rungroj (red card) 67'		Trakoolchat 37'; Tatree 57'

Bangkok University Stadium, Bangkok
Attendance: 751
Referee: Apisit Aonrak
3 December 2010
18:00 UTC+7

Army United	2–0	Songkhla
Tatree 68'; Nipol 81'

Thai Army Sports Stadium, Bangkok
Referee: Surapol Sawangjit
9 December 2010
16:00 UTC+7

Songkhla	0–2	Bangkok United
		Kornwit 37'; Kittisak 42'

Nathawee Municipality Stadium, Songkhla
Referee: Sura Sriart
13 December 2010
18:00 UTC+7

Army United	0–0	Bangkok United

Thai Army Sports Stadium, Bangkok
Referee: Mongkolchai Pradsri
19 December 2010
18:00 UTC+7

Songkhla	1–1	Army United
Witthawat 6'		Nipol 65'

Nathawee Municipality Stadium, Songkhla
25 December 2010
17:00 UTC+7

Bangkok United	1–1	Songkhla
Paramed 20'		Chairat 50'

Bangkok University Stadium, Bangkok
Referee: Prathan Nasawang

== Results ==
Home \ Away	BKG	BKU	BEC	PEA	CHO	MTU	OSO	PAT	POL	SNA	RTA	SAS	SIS	THP	TOT	TTM
Bangkok Glass		4–0	2–2	0–3	0–0	1–0	0–0	3–1	1–0	5–0	3–1	3–1	3–1	0–0	1–1	2–2
Bangkok United	1–4		1–1	2–0	3–1	0–3	1–4	0–1	0–4	0–0	0–1	0–0	0–1	1–1	1–2	0–3
BEC Tero Sasana	0–1	3–0		1–4	1–4	0–1	3–1	2–3	2–0	0–0	2–1	2–1	2–3	4–2	1–0	2–2
Buriram PEA	3–1	0–0	1–1		3–1	1–0	2–0	3–1	4–2	4–2	3–1	3–1	1–0	0–0	0–0	2–0
Chonburi	2–1	2–1	2–0	2–2		0–0	0–0	2–2	3–3	1–1	3–0	0–0	3–1	2–1	2–0	5–1
Muangthong United	2–0	5–1	2–0	0–0	4–1		4–1	1–0	1–0	1–0	3–3	5–0	6–0	1–0	4–0	2–2
Osotspa M-150 Saraburi	4–1	1–2	0–0	0–1	1–1	0–3		0–0	2–1	1–1	0–1	0–0	6–3	1–0	1–0	1–1
Pattaya United	1–1	1–2	3–1	3–3	1–2	2–2	0–0		2–0	3–1	1–0	2–0	2–1	0–1	1–0	4–1
Police United	3–2	1–1	1–2	1–1	0–4	1–0	1–2	2–2		2–3	0–0	1–2	0–1	0–1	1–0	4–1
Siam Navy	3–3	1–1	3–1	0–0	0–4	1–2	1–2	1–1	1–0		2–1	0–0	4–3	2–4	3–2	1–2
Royal Thai Army	1–3	1–1	1–1	0–2	1–0	2–2	0–1	0–2	1–2	0–1		2–3	2–2	0–2	0–1	3–2
Samut Songkhram	1–0	0–2	1–0	0–0	0–3	0–0	0–1	2–0	1–1	1–0	4–2		1–0	1–0	2–0	0–0
Sisaket	1–2	1–1	1–0	0–3	0–1	1–2	0–0	1–1	2–4	4–1	0–1	1–1		1–1	1–1	4–0
Thai Port	2–1	3–2	1–0	0–0	1–2	1–4	1–1	2–0	3–2	3–0	5–0	1–0	2–0		1–1	1–1
TOT-CAT	2–0	1–0	0–5	0–2	0–2	1–2	0–0	1–3	0–2	1–0	0–0	2–1	3–2	2–1		1–3
TTM Phichit	0–0	2–1	0–0	0–0	0–2	0–2	2–1	3–0	0–1	0–2	3–1	1–3	0–0	0–0	0–1	

Source: Thai Premier League
Legend: Blue = home team win; Yellow = draw; Red = away team win.

== Season statistics ==
=== Top scorers ===
Rank	Scorer	Club	Goals
1	(Cameroon) Kengne Ludovick	Pattaya United	17
2	(Ivory Coast) Dagno Siaka	Muangthong United	15
3	(Thailand) Anon Sangsanoi	BEC Tero Sasana	14
4	(Thailand) Sarayoot Chaikamdee	Thai Port	13
5	(Thailand) Chakrit Buathong	BEC Tero Sasana (3 goals); Police United (8 goals)	11
5	(Thailand) Suchao Nuchnum	Buriram PEA	11
7	(Thailand) Chatree Chimtalay	Bangkok Glass	10
7	(Brazil) Dudu	Buriram PEA	10
7	(Ivory Coast) Koné Mohamed	Muangthong United	10
7	(Thailand) Pipob On-Mo	Chonburi	10
7	(Thailand) Therdsak Chaiman	Chonburi	10

=== Top assists ===
Rank	Assistant	Club	Assists
1	(Thailand) Rangsan Viwatchaichok	Buriram PEA	12
2	(Nigeria) Samuel Ajayi	Bangkok Glass	11
3	(Thailand) Supachai Komsilp	Bangkok Glass	7
4	(Thailand) Piyachart Tamaphan	Muangthong United	6
5	(Thailand) Arthit Sunthornpit	Chonburi	5
5	(Thailand) Chakrit Buathong	Police United	5
5	(Ivory Coast) Dagno Siaka	Muangthong United	5
5	(Thailand) Datsakorn Thonglao	Muangthong United	5
5	(Thailand) Ekaphan Inthasen	Chonburi	5
5	(Thailand) Jakkrapong Somboon	Royal Thai Army	5
5	(Thailand) Sarayoot Chaikamdee	Thai Port	5

=== Hat-tricks ===
Key
^{4}	Player scored four goals
^{5}	Player scored five goals

Player	Nationality	For	Against	Result^{[a]}	Date
Michael Byrne	Wales	Chonburi	BEC Tero Sasana	4–1	14 July 2010
Ney Fabiano	Brazil	Chonburi	Samut Songkhram	3–0	22 August 2010
Chakrit Buathong	Thailand	Insee Police United	Chonburi	3–3	3 October 2010
Anon Sangsanoi	Thailand	BEC Tero Sasana	Thai Port	4–2	14 October 2010

== Awards ==
=== Monthly awards ===
Month	Coach of the Month		Player of the Month	
Month	Head coach	Club	Player	Club
May	(Thailand) Jadet Meelarp	Chonburi	(Thailand) Therdsak Chaiman	Chonburi
June	(Thailand) Attaphol Buspakom	Buriram PEA	(Thailand) Sarayoot Chaikamdee	Thai Port
July	(Belgium) René Desaeyere	Muangthong United	(Cameroon) Kengne Ludovick	Pattaya United
August	(Thailand) Jadet Meelarp	Chonburi	(Thailand) Kawin Thamsatchanan	Muangthong United
September	(Thailand) Somchai Chuayboonchum	Samut Songkhram	(Thailand) Datsakorn Thonglao	Muangthong United
October	(Thailand) Attaphol Buspakom	Buriram PEA	(Thailand) Pipob On-Mo	Chonburi

=== Annual awards ===
==== TPL Player of the Year ====
The Player of the Year was awarded to:

- Goalkeeper of the Year – Kawin Thamsatchanan
- Defender of the Year – Nattaporn Phanrit
- Midfielder of the Year – Therdsak Chaiman
- Striker of the Year – Sarayoot Chaikamdee

==== TPL Young Player of the Year ====
The Young Player of the Year was awarded to Phuritad Jarikanon.

==== TPL Head Coach of the Year ====
The Head Coach of the Year was awarded to René Desaeyere.

==== TPL Fair Play Award ====
The Fair Play Award was given to Osotspa Saraburi.

== See also ==
- 2010 Thai Division 1 League
- 2010 Regional League Division 2
- 2010 Thai FA Cup
- 2010 Kor Royal Cup
