= Punnarat Klinsukon =

Thai footballer (born 1981)

Personal information
- Full name: Punnarat Klinsukon
- Date of birth: February 12, 1981 (age 45)
- Place of birth: Chonburi, Thailand
- Height: 1.78 m (5 ft 10 in)
- Position: Center back

Youth career
- 1999–2002: Watsuthiwaram School

Senior career*
Years	Team	Apps	(Gls)
2003–2010	Bangkok United	122	(6)
2011	Chanthaburi	19	(0)
2011	TTM Phichit	8	(0)
2011	Police United	10	(0)
2012–2013	TOT	25	(0)
2016	Chamchuri United		

International career^{‡}
2006–2008	Thailand	5	(0)
- * Club domestic league appearances and goals as of 02:41, 15 September 2018 (UTC) ‡ National team caps and goals as of 09:41, 16 September 2021 (UTC)

Punnarat Klinsukon (born February 12, 1981) is a Thai former footballer who played as a defender.

== Honours ==
- Thailand Premier League 2006 championship with Bangkok United

== International career ==
Punnarat made his senior debut for the national team in a World Cup qualifying match home to Yemen, played at the Supachalasai Stadium. He was played two games for the national side.
