= Hatthaporn Suwan =

Thai footballer (born 1984)

Personal information
- Full name: Hatthaporn Suwan
- Date of birth: 23 February 1984 (age 42)
- Place of birth: Thung Hua Chang, Lampoon, Thailand
- Height: 1.75 m (5 ft 9 in)
- Position: Defensive midfielder

Senior career*
Years	Team	Apps	(Gls)
2004–2006	Tobacco Monopoly	47	(3)
2007	Provincial Electricity Authority	29	(1)
2008	Pattaya United	22	(0)
2009	Muangthong United	9	(1)
2010	BEC Tero Sasana	16	(0)
2010–2012	Esan United	5	(0)
Total		128	(5)

International career
2007–2008	Thailand	4	(0)
- * Club domestic league appearances and goals as of 30 May 2009

Hatthaporn Suwan (Thai: หัตฐพร สุวรรณ; born February 23, 1984) is a Thai former footballer. He last played for Thai Premier League side Esan United. Hatthaporn retired from professional football in 2012, due to injuries.

== International career ==
Hatthaporn made his international debut against Singapore in the 2007 AFF Championship (4 February 2007) and has also been used as a substitute against the same opposition, but so far has failed to break into the side on a regular basis.

== Honours ==
- Thailand Premier League 2004/05 with Thailand Tobacco Monopoly FC
- Thailand Premier League 2009 with Muang Thong United
