= Jakkapan =

Jakkapan, Jakkaphan, Jukkapant or Jakrapun (Thai: จักรพันธ์, RTGS: Chakkraphan) is a masculine Thai given name. Notable people with the given name include:

- Jakrapun Kornburiteerachote, Thai singer
- Jakkaphan Kaewprom, Thai footballer
- Jakkapan Pornsai, Thai footballer
- Jakkapan Praisuwan, Thai footballer
- Jakkapan Prommaros, Thai footballer
- Jukkapant Punpee, Thai football coach
- Jakrapan Thanathiratham, Thai badminton player
