= Sakda Kaewboonmee =

Thai footballer (born 1982)

Personal information
- Full name: Sakda Kaewboonmee
- Date of birth: 30 December 1982 (age 43)
- Place of birth: Loei, Thailand
- Height: 1.79 m (5 ft 10 1/2 in)
- Position: Defender

Team information
- Current team: TTM Samut Sakhon
- Number: 23

Senior career*
Years	Team	Apps	(Gls)
2005–	TTM Samut Sakhon		
- * Club domestic league appearances and goals as of 14 November 2008

Sakda Kaewboonmee is a Thai professional footballer who currently plays for TTM Samut Sakhon in the Thailand Premier League.

He played for Thailand Tobacco Monopoly FC in the 2005 ASEAN Club Championship.
