= Nakarin =

Nakarin (Thai: นครินทร์) is a Thai given name. Notable people with the name include:

- Nakarin Atiratphuvapat (born 1996), Thai motorcycle racer
- Nakarin Fuplook (born 1983), Thai footballer
