= Prachya Hong-In =

Thai footballer (born 1983)

Personal information
- Full name: Prachya Hong-In
- Date of birth: 14 June 1983 (age 43)
- Place of birth: Lopburi, Thailand
- Height: 1.75 m (5 ft 9 in)
- Position: Defender

Senior career*
Years	Team	Apps	(Gls)
2006–2009	Sisaket	54	(2)
2010–2011	Nakhon Phanom		
2012–2013	Pattaya United		
2013	→ Trat (loan)		
2014	Phuket		
2014–2015	Nakhon Pathom United		
- * Club domestic league appearances and goals as of 28 June 2008

Prachya Hong-In (Thai: ปรัชญา หงษ์อินทร์, born June 14, 1983) is a former professional footballer from Thailand.
