= Tehwa Sritammanusarn =

Thai footballer (born 1982)

Personal information
- Full name: Tehwa Sritammanusarn
- Date of birth: 30 January 1982 (age 44)
- Place of birth: Nakhon Ratchasima, Thailand
- Height: 1.70 m (5 ft 7 in)
- Position: Midfielder

Senior career*
Years	Team	Apps	(Gls)
2007	Bangkok Bank		
2008	Muangthong United		
2009	Raj-Vithi		
2010	Sisaket	21	(2)
2011	BEC Tero Sasana		
2012	Nakhon Ratchasima		
2012–2013	Bangkok		
2013	Khon Kaen		
- * Club domestic league appearances and goals as of April 13, 2010 ‡ National team caps and goals as of April 18, 2010

Tehwa Sritammanusarn is a Thai retired football player who currently plays for Thailand Division 1 League side Nakhon Ratchasima.

== Honours ==
Muangthong United

- Thai Division 1 League: 2008 Champion
