= Tadpong Lar-tham =

Thai footballer

Personal information
- Full name: Tadpong Lar-tham
- Date of birth: 26 May 1986 (age 40)
- Place of birth: Bangkok, Thailand
- Height: 1.71 m (5 ft 7 1/2 in)
- Position: Striker

Senior career*
Years	Team	Apps	(Gls)
2008–2017	Sisaket	42	(15)
- * Club domestic league appearances and goals as of April 13, 2010

Tadpong Lar-tham (Thai: ทัตพงศ์ หล้าธรรม, born May 26, 1986) is a Thai professional footballer who plays as a striker.
