= Ekkapan Jandakorn =

Thai footballer (born 1986)

Personal information
- Full name: Ekkapan Jandakorn
- Date of birth: 17 January 1986 (age 40)
- Place of birth: Sisaket, Thailand
- Height: 1.75 m (5 ft 9 in)
- Position: Defender

Youth career
- 2007: Sisaket

Senior career*
Years	Team	Apps	(Gls)
2008–2012	Sisaket	83	(4)
2012–2013	Police United	16	(0)
2014–2017	Sisaket	74	(4)
Total		173	(8)
- * Club domestic league appearances and goals as of 01:45, 24 November 2017 (UTC) ‡ National team caps and goals as of April 18, 2010

Ekkapan Jandakorn (Thai: เอกพันธ์ จันดากรณ์, born January 17, 1986), is a Thai former professional footballer who played as a defender.

== Match fixing scandal and ban ==
On February 21, 2017 Ekkapan was accused of match-fixing on several league games. He was arrested by Royal Thai Police and banned from football for life.
