= Jeerawat Thongluae =

Thai footballer (born 1982)

Personal information
- Full name: Jeerawat Thongluae
- Date of birth: April 27, 1982 (age 44)
- Place of birth: Sisaket, Thailand
- Height: 1.63 m (5 ft 4 in)
- Position: Midfielder

Team information
- Current team: Sisaket
- Number: 8

Senior career*
Years	Team	Apps	(Gls)
2007–2008	Chula United	31	(2)
2009–present	Sisaket	22	(0)
- * Club domestic league appearances and goals as of 22 June 2008

Jeerawat Thongluae (Thai จีรวัฒน์ ทองลือ) is a Thai footballer. He plays for Thailand Division 1 League clubside Sisaket.
