= Army United F.C. =

Association football club in Thailand

Army United อาร์มี่ ยูไนเต็ด
- Full name: Army United Football Club สโมสรฟุตบอลอาร์มี่ ยูไนเต็ด
- Nicknames: Gentleman Ranger (สุภาพบุรุษวงจักร)
- Founded: 1916; as Royal Thai Army Football Club
- Dissolved: 2019
- Ground: Royal Thai Army Stadium; Bangkok, Thailand
- Capacity: 20,000
- Owner: Royal Thai Army
Home colours	Away colours	Third colours

Army United Football Club (Thai: สโมสรฟุตบอลอาร์มี่ ยูไนเต็ด) was a Thai defunct professional football club under the stewardship of the Royal Thai Army based in the Din Daeng District of Bangkok. It was one of the oldest football clubs in Asia, until it was discontinued at the end of the 2019 season after 103 years in existence.

The club was founded in 1916 and was known as Royal Thai Army until November 2010. Their home stadium was known locally as the Thai Army Sports Stadium and was more widely known around Asian circles as the Royal Thai Army Stadium, which had been host to numerous international youth matches due to its central Bangkok location. The club played in red shirts with red shorts and red socks. Despite finishing bottom of the Thai Premier League in 2010, they managed to regain their top-flight status after winning Group B of the Thai League Play-off in 2011.

== History ==
Army United represented the Royal Thai Army and had traditionally been Thailand's yo-yo club along with the Navy and Police clubs. Up until 2010, and the name change from the Royal Thai Army to Army United, the club lacked support and had dwindling crowds, and were mainly supported by Army personnel shipped in for the games.

The Army team had always been a mid ranking Thai team with their biggest successes coming in the Thai Division 1 League with a championship in the 2004–05 season and 2nd place in 2009. Both of these successes had of course come after relegation from the Thai Premier League.

The club were based in the Din Daeng District of Central Bangkok, which is the area that bases the Royal Thai Army. Up until the 2011 season, the club operated a policy of only playing homegrown talent, but ditched this as the game became more professional and foreign players were brought into the team. Previously, the players would work for the Army during the week and play football on weekends, somewhat different from most clubs who operated on a full-time basis.

In the 2010 season, they were reprieved from relegation after an end of season relegation/playoff system was announced to expand the Thai Premier League, and thus escaped relegation despite finishing 16th.

In 2011, rebranded Army United signed five Brazilians and surprised all expectations as they topped the TPL in the early weeks of the season, with Leandro Dos Santos scoring regularly. Crowds rose from a few hundred to a season average of 5,580. However, the early season form petered out and Army finished in 13th position.

Army United logo in 100th anniversary of the founding

In 2012, most of the Brazilians had moved on but were replaced with other highly rated foreign stars. Daniel Blanco was the most impressive performer as Army flirted with the Top 6 for long periods before eventually finishing in 10th position.

The 2012 season also coincided with Army reaching the 2012 Thai FA Cup final. On the way to the final, Army was given a reprieve after they lost a penalty shoot-out to regional league side Trat. It turned out that Trat had fielded an unregistered player and was booted out of the cup with Army reinstated. Army United then defeated runaway TPL leaders Muangthong United on the way to the final. However, Army lost the final 2–1 to Buriram United.

In 2013, the club signed a strategic partnership deal with Thai-owned English club Leicester City.

In 2019, Army United decided to dissolve the club, ending the history of the club after 103 years.

== Stadium ==
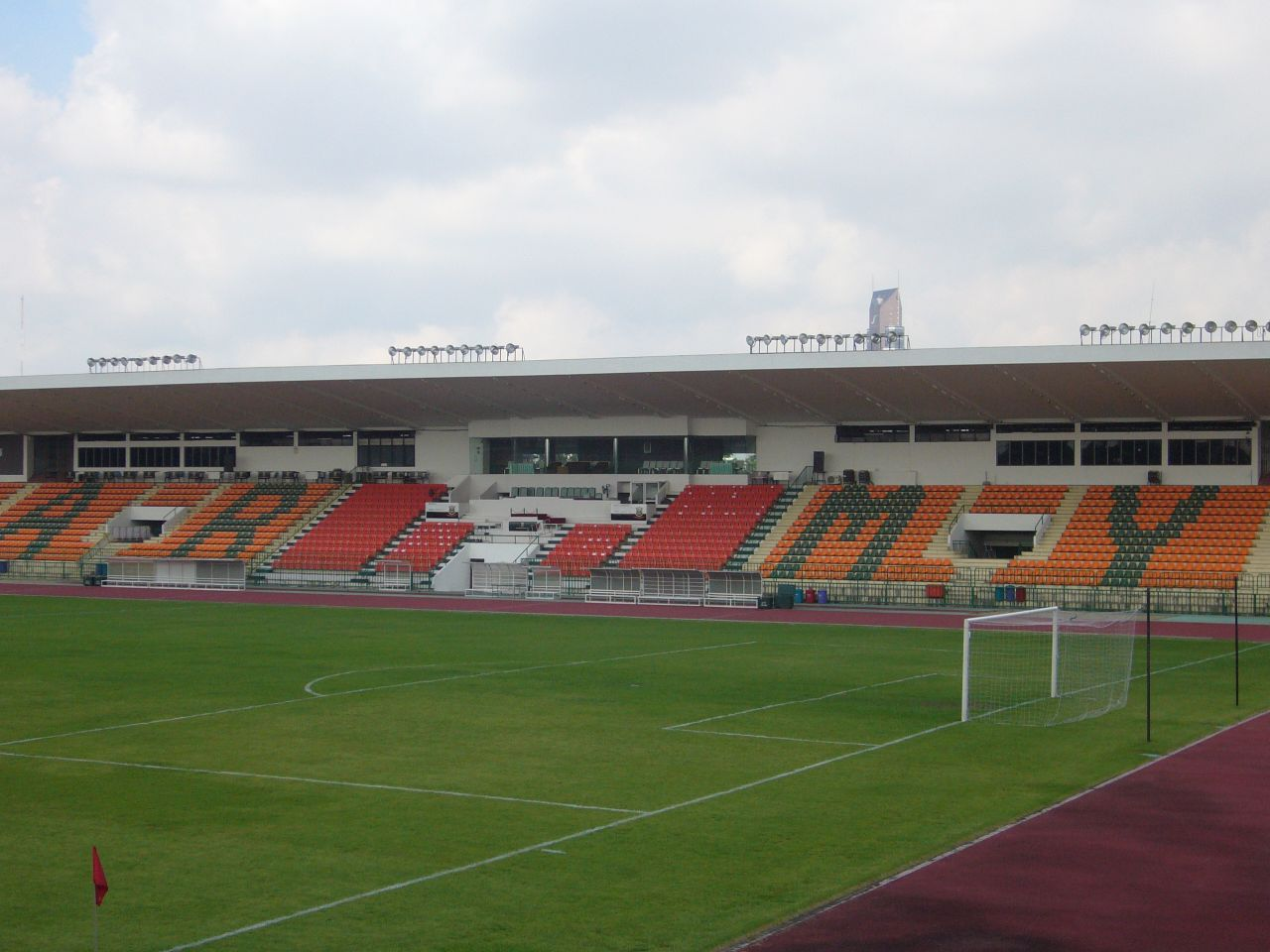
Royal Thai Army Stadium

Thai Army Sports Stadium is a multi-purpose stadium on Vibhavadi-Rangsit Road in the Din Daeng District of north Bangkok, Thailand. It is currently used mostly for football matches and is the home stadium of Army United F.C. The stadium holds 20,000 and has a single stand with covered seating on one side and terracing on three sides. An athletics track surrounds the pitch. It is often used by Thai club sides in international football competitions and was used by Bangkok University in the 2007 AFC Champions League and Osotsapa in the 2007 AFC Cup. Additionally, it has been used for matches involving national sides in international tournaments hosted by Thailand where the hosts are not involved.

=== Stadium and locations by season records ===
Coordinates	Location	Stadium	Capacity	Year
13°46′58″N 100°33′22″E	Bangkok	Royal Thai Army Stadium	15,000	2007–2019

== Season by season domestic record ==
Season	League									FA Cup	Queen's Cup	League Cup	Kor Royal Cup	AFC Champions League	Top scorer	
Season	Division	P	W	D	L	F	A	Pts	Pos	FA Cup	Queen's Cup	League Cup	Kor Royal Cup	AFC Champions League	Name	Goals
1996–97	TSL	34	14	12	8	60	50	54	8th	—N/a	–	–	–	–	—N/a	—N/a
1997	TSL	22	7	4	11	31	45	25	9th	—N/a	–	–	–	–	—N/a	—N/a
1998	TPL	22	7	5	10	35	42	26	7th	—N/a	–	–	–	–	—N/a	—N/a
1999	TPL	22	7	4	11	25	30	25	11th	—N/a	–	–	–	–	—N/a	—N/a
2000	DIV 1	—N/a	—N/a	—N/a	—N/a	—N/a	—N/a	—N/a	—N/a	—N/a	–	–	–	–	—N/a	—N/a
2001–02	DIV 1	—N/a	—N/a	—N/a	—N/a	—N/a	—N/a	—N/a	—N/a	—N/a	–	–	–	–	—N/a	—N/a
2002–03	DIV 1	—N/a	—N/a	—N/a	—N/a	—N/a	—N/a	—N/a	—N/a	–	–	–	–	–	—N/a	—N/a
2003–04	DIV 1	—N/a	—N/a	—N/a	—N/a	—N/a	—N/a	—N/a	—N/a	–	–	–	–	–	—N/a	—N/a
2004–05	DIV 1	—N/a	—N/a	—N/a	—N/a	—N/a	—N/a	—N/a	1st	–	–	–	–	–	—N/a	—N/a
2006	TPL	22	7	9	6	31	38	30	6th	–	GR	–	–	–	—N/a	—N/a
2007	TPL	30	13	8	9	40	33	47	5th	–	–	–	–	–	Jakkraphong Somboon	9
2008	TPL	30	6	7	17	21	44	25	15th	–	–	–	–	–	Jakkraphong Somboon	4
2009	DIV 1	30	18	4	4	55	18	62	2nd	R2	GR	R2	–	–	Tatree Seeha	17
2010	TPL	30	5	7	18	27	54	22	16th	SF	QF	R2	–	–	Tatree Seeha	8
2011	TPL	30	10	9	15	39	40	39	13th	SF	–	R1	–	–	Leandro Dos Santos	18
2012	TPL	34	10	13	11	34	38	43	10th	RU	–	R1	–	–	Björn Lindemann	6
2013	TPL	32	13	9	10	48	40	48	6th	R4	–	QF	–	–	Aron da Silva	11
2014	TPL	38	14	11	13	52	55	53	9th	R3	–	R1	–	–	Raphael Botti; Tanakorn Dangthong	9
2015	TPL	34	11	8	15	43	47	41	10th	SF	–	SF	–	–	Mongkol Tossakrai	7
2016	TL	31	8	6	17	34	46	30	16th	R3	–	R1	–	–	Josimar	16
2017	T2	32	10	9	13	53	57	39	9th	R3	–	R1	–	–	Marcos Vinícius	18
2018	T2	28	7	13	8	38	41	34	8th	R2	–	R1	–	–	Erivelto	14
2019	T2	34	15	10	9	56	43	55	5th	R2	–	QF	–	–	Tanakorn Dangthong	16

Champions	Runners-up	Third place	Promoted	Relegated

- P = Played
- W = Games Won
- D = Games Drawn
- L = Games Lost
- F = Goals for
- A = Goals Against
- Pts = Points
- Pos = Final Position
- N/A = No answer
- TPL = Thai Premier League
- TL = Thai League 1
- QR1 = First Qualifying Round
- QR2 = Second Qualifying Round
- QR3 = Third Qualifying Round
- QR4 = Fourth Qualifying Round
- RInt = Intermediate Round
- R1 = Round 1
- R2 = Round 2
- R3 = Round 3
- R4 = Round 4
- R5 = Round 5
- R6 = Round 6
- GR = Group stage
- QF = Quarter-finals
- SF = Semi-finals
- RU = Runners-up
- S = Shared
- W = Winners

== Coaches ==
Coaches by Years (1996–2019)

Name	Nat	Period	Honours
Amnart Chalermchaowarit	(Thailand)	1996–97, 2007	Thai Division 1 League:Winner 2004–05
Watcharakorn Antakhamphu	(Thailand)	2008	
Thanadech Phooprasert	(Thailand)	2009–10	Thai Division 1 League:Runners-up 2009
Pongphan Wongsuwan	(Thailand)	2011	
Adul Rungrueng	(Thailand)	2011	
Amnart Chalermchaowarit	(Thailand)	2012	
Paniphon Kerdyam	(Thailand)	Sept 2012 – Nov 2012	2012 Thai FA Cup Runner-up
Alexandré Pölking	(Brazil)	31 Oct 2012 – Nov 2013	
Matt Elliott	(Scotland)	Jan 2014 – Jun 2014	
Gary Stevens	(England)	Aug 2014 – May 2015	
Issara Sritaro	(Thailand)	May 2015 – October 2015	
Watcharakorn Antakhamphu	(Thailand)	October 2015 – November 2016	
Thanis Areesngarkul	(Thailand)	November 2016 – March 2017	
Rangsiwut Chaloempathum (interim)	(Thailand)	March 2017 – July 2017	
Daniel Blanco	(Argentina)	July 2017 – November 2017	
Nascimento	(Portugal)	November 2017 – June 2018	
Adul Luekijna	(Thailand)	June 2018 – October 2018	
Daniel Blanco	(Argentina)	October 2018 – November 2019	

== Honours ==
=== Domestic competitions ===
- Thai Division 1 League
  - Champions (1): 2004–05
- Thai FA Cup
  - Runners-up (1): 2012
- Kor Royal Cup
  - Winners (1): 1983
- Queen's Cup
  - Runners-up (1): 1997
