= Piyanat Pohpar =

Thai footballer (born 1988)

Personal information
- Full name: Piyanat Pohpar
- Date of birth: 28 April 1988 (age 38)
- Place of birth: Sa Kaeo, Thailand
- Height: 1.70 m (5 ft 7 in)
- Position: Defender

Team information
- Current team: Ayutthaya
- Number: 23

Senior career*
Years	Team	Apps	(Gls)
2008–2013	Sisaket	32	(0)
2014	Ubon UMT		
2015–	Ayutthaya		
- * Club domestic league appearances and goals as of April 13, 2010 ‡ National team caps and goals as of April 18, 2010

Piyanat Pohpar (Thai: ปิยณัฐ โพธิ์ผา, born April 28, 1988) is a Thai professional footballer who currently plays for Ayutthaya in the Thai Division 1 League.

== Honours ==
=== Club ===
Ubon Ratchathani

- Thai Division 2 League Champions (1) : 2014
