= Watcharakorn Antakhamphu =

Thai footballer and manager (born 1974)

Personal information
- Full name: Watcharakorn Antakhamphu
- Date of birth: 12 September 1974 (age 52)
- Place of birth: Nakhon Ratchasima, Thailand
- Position: Attacking midfielder

Senior career*
Years	Team	Apps	(Gls)
1982–1993	Army United		

Managerial career
- 2008: Army United
- 2015: Army United (caretaker)
- 2016: Army United
- * Club domestic league appearances and goals

Watcharakorn Antakhamphu (Thai: วัชรกร อันทะคำภู, born September 12, 1974) is a Thai professional football manager and former football player.

== Managerial career ==
In October 2015, Watcharakorn was named the interim manager of Army United. In December 2015 it was announced that Watcharakorn would become the new manager of Army United.
