= 2005 ASEAN Club Championship =

Tournament details
- Host country: Brunei
- Dates: 22–31 July
- Teams: 8 (from 1 confederation)
- Venue: 1 (in 1 host city)

Final positions
- Champions: (Singapore) Tampines Rovers (1st title)
- Runners-up: (Malaysia) Pahang
- Third place: (Brunei) DPMM (Vietnam) Hoàng Anh Gia Lai

Tournament statistics
- Matches played: 15
- Goals scored: 64 (4.27 per match)
- Top scorer: (Vietnam) Nguyen Dinh Viet (7 goals)

The 2005 ASEAN Club Championship or the 2005 ACC was the second edition of the ASEAN Club Championship, an international football competition between domestic champion clubs sides affiliated with the member associations of the ASEAN Football Federation. This year, Tampines Rovers from Singapore won the championship.

== Association team allocation ==
Participation for 2005 ACC
| Participating |
| Not participating |

| Football association | Group stage |
|---|---|
| Malaysia | 1 |
| Thailand | 1 |
| Vietnam | 1 |
| Singapore | 1 |
| Brunei | 1 |
| Cambodia | 1 |
| Myanmar | 1 |
| Timor-Leste | 1 |
| Indonesia | — |
| Laos | — |
| Philippines | — |

Notes

1. Indonesia: The Liga Indonesia champions Persebaya Surabaya were thought to have renounced their participation due to a congested fixture list.
2. Laos: The Champion team MCTPC were thought to have renounced their participation for financial reasons.
3. Philippines: The Champion team from the National Capital Region FA were thought to have renounced their participation for financial reasons.

== Qualified teams ==
Location of the 2005 ASEAN Club Championship clubs

| Team | Qualification |
|---|---|
| (Malaysia) Pahang | Super League Malaysia 2004 champions |
| (Vietnam) Hoang Anh Gia Lai | 2004 V-League champions |
| (Timor-Leste) Zebra Baucau | 2004 Super Liga champions |
| (Cambodia) Nagacorp | 2004 Cambodian League champions |
| (Singapore) Tampines Rovers | 2004 S.League champions |
| (Brunei) DPMM | 2004 Brunei Premier League champions & host team |
| (Myanmar) Finance and Revenue | 2004 Myanmar Premier League champions |
| Thailand Tobacco Monopoly | 2004–05 Thai League champions |

== Group stage ==
- Matchday dates are: 22–31 July 2005
- Group winners and runners-up qualify for semi-finals

=== Group A ===
| Team | Pld | W | D | L | GF | GA | GD | Pts |
|---|---|---|---|---|---|---|---|---|
| (Malaysia) Pahang | 3 | 3 | 0 | 0 | 15 | 0 | +15 | 9 |
| (Vietnam) Hoàng Anh Gia Lai | 3 | 2 | 0 | 1 | 19 | 6 | +13 | 6 |
| (Timor-Leste) Zebra Baucau | 3 | 1 | 0 | 2 | 4 | 22 | −18 | 3 |
| (Cambodia) Nagacorp | 3 | 0 | 0 | 3 | 1 | 11 | −10 | 0 |

Source: RSSSF
22 July 2005

| Zebra Baucau (Timor-Leste) | 3–0 | (Cambodia) Nagacorp |
|---|---|---|
| João Kik 51'; Jaime Victor da Costa Filipe 71', 89' |

Hassanal Bolkiah National Stadium, Bandar Seri Begawan
22 July 2005

| Pahang (Malaysia) | 4–0 | (Vietnam) Hoàng Anh Gia Lai |
|---|---|---|
| Bernard Tchoutang 3', 14'; Indra Putra Mahayuddin 67'; Irwan Fadly Idrus 70' |

Hassanal Bolkiah National Stadium, Bandar Seri Begawan

24 July 2005

| Nagacorp (Cambodia) | 1–5 | (Vietnam) Hoàng Anh Gia Lai |
|---|---|---|
| Michael Thach Nen 22' | | Dusit Chalermsan 34'; Nguyen Van Dan 41', 45'; Kiatisuk Senamuang 56' (pen.); Vimon Jancam 83' |

Hassanal Bolkiah National Stadium, Bandar Seri Begawan
24 July 2005

| Pahang (Malaysia) | 8–0 | (Timor-Leste) Zebra Baucau |
|---|---|---|
| Bernard Tchoutang 53', 70', 75'; Shahrulnizam Sahat 69', 85'; Hairuddin Omar 77'; Rosdi Talib 82', 88' |

Hassanal Bolkiah National Stadium, Bandar Seri Begawan

26 July 2005

| Hoàng Anh Gia Lai (Vietnam) | 14–1 | (Timor-Leste) Zebra Baucau |
|---|---|---|
| Kiatisuk Senamuang 2'; Nguyen Dinh Viet 7', 30', 42', 50', 79' (pen.), 86', 90'; Chu Ngoc Canh 8'; Dusit Chalermsan 19'; Nguyen Van Dan 27'; Nguyen Van Kiet 49'; Tran Minh Thien 80'; Duong Minh Ninh 81' | | Demofilho Marques 89' |

Hassanal Bolkiah National Stadium, Bandar Seri Begawan
26 July 2005

| Nagacorp (Cambodia) | 0–3 | (Malaysia) Pahang |
|---|---|---|
| | | Jalaluddin Jaafar 14'; Indra Putra Mahayuddin 40', 66' |

Hassanal Bolkiah National Stadium, Bandar Seri Begawan

=== Group B ===
| Team | Pld | W | D | L | GF | GA | GD | Pts |
|---|---|---|---|---|---|---|---|---|
| (Singapore) Tampines Rovers | 3 | 3 | 0 | 0 | 6 | 2 | +4 | 9 |
| (Brunei) DPMM | 3 | 1 | 1 | 1 | 4 | 4 | 0 | 4 |
| (Myanmar) Finance and Revenue | 3 | 1 | 0 | 2 | 4 | 5 | −1 | 3 |
| Thailand Tobacco Monopoly | 3 | 0 | 1 | 2 | 4 | 7 | −3 | 1 |

Source: RSSSF
23 July 2005

| DPMM (Brunei) | 2–2 | Thailand Tobacco Monopoly |
|---|---|---|
| Goran Vujanovic 33'; Mohd Saiful Rizal Awang 83' | | Anderson 3', 24' |

Hassanal Bolkiah National Stadium, Bandar Seri Begawan
23 July 2005

| Tampines Rovers (Singapore) | 2–1 | (Myanmar) Finance and Revenue |
|---|---|---|
| Mustafic Fahrudin 43'; Mirko Grabovac 65' | | Kyaw Thu Ra 11' |

Hassanal Bolkiah National Stadium, Bandar Seri Begawan

25 July 2005

| Finance and Revenue (Myanmar) | 1–2 | (Brunei) DPMM |
|---|---|---|
| Kyaw Thu Ra 37' | | Goran Vujanovic 44'; Rosmin Kamis 90' |

Hassanal Bolkiah National Stadium, Bandar Seri Begawan
25 July 2005

| Thailand Tobacco Monopoly | 1–3 | (Singapore) Tampines Rovers |
|---|---|---|
| Sakda Kaewboonmee 69' | | Mirko Grabovac 13', 64'; Sead Muratovic 43' (pen.) |

Hassanal Bolkiah National Stadium, Bandar Seri Begawan

27 July 2005

| DPMM (Brunei) | 0–1 | (Singapore) Tampines Rovers |
|---|---|---|
| | | Santi Chaiyaphuak 27' |

Hassanal Bolkiah National Stadium, Bandar Seri Begawan
27 July 2005

| Finance and Revenue (Myanmar) | 2–1 | Thailand Tobacco Monopoly |
|---|---|---|
| Kyaw Thu Ra 12', 38' | | Anderson 66' |

Hassanal Bolkiah National Stadium, Bandar Seri Begawan

== Knockout stage ==
=== Bracket ===
Semi-finals
29 July
(Malaysia) Pahang | 1
(Brunei) DPMM | 0
29 July
(Singapore) Tampines Rovers (p) | 0 (5)
(Vietnam) Hoàng Anh Gia Lai | 0 (3)

Final
31 July
(Malaysia) Pahang | 2
(Singapore) Tampines Rovers | 4

=== Semi finals ===
29 July 2005

| Pahang (Malaysia) | 1–0 | (Brunei) DPMM |
|---|---|---|
| Bernard Tchoutang 38' |

29 July 2005

| Tampines Rovers (Singapore) | 0–0 (a.e.t.) | (Vietnam) Hoàng Anh Gia Lai |
Penalties
| | 5–3 |

=== 3rd Place Playoff ===
None, (Brunei) DPMM and (Vietnam) Hoàng Anh Gia Lai are joint third-placers.

=== Final ===
31 July 2005

| Pahang (Malaysia) | 2–4 | (Singapore) Tampines Rovers |
|---|---|---|
| Hairuddin Omar 44'; Bernard Tchoutang 46' | | Mohd Noh Alam Shah 59', 84'; Mirko Grabovac 71'; Mustafic Fahrudin 79' |

== Top scorers ==
| Player | Club | Goals |
|---|---|---|
| (Vietnam) Nguyễn Đình Việt | (Vietnam) Hoang Anh Gia Lai | 7 |
| (Singapore) Mirko Grabovac | (Singapore) Tampines Rovers | 4 |
| (Myanmar) Kyaw Thu Ra | (Myanmar) Finance and Revenue | 4 |
| (Malaysia) Indra Putra Mahayuddin | (Malaysia) Pahang | 3 |
| (Vietnam) Nguyễn Văn Đàn | (Vietnam) Hoang Anh Gia Lai | 3 |
| (Brazil) Anderson | Thailand Tobacco Monopoly | 3 |
| (Singapore) Mustafic Fahrudin | (Singapore) Tampines Rovers | 2 |
| (Singapore) Mohd Noh Alam Shah | (Singapore) Tampines Rovers | 2 |
| (Malaysia) Shahrulnizam Sahat | (Malaysia) Pahang | 2 |
| (Malaysia) Hairuddin Omar | (Malaysia) Pahang | 2 |
| (Malaysia) Rosdi Talib | (Malaysia) Pahang | 2 |
| (Thailand) Dusit Chalermsan | (Vietnam) Hoang Anh Gia Lai | 2 |
| (Thailand) Kiatisuk Senamuang | (Vietnam) Hoang Anh Gia Lai | 2 |
| (Croatia) Goran Vujanovic | (Brunei) DPMM | 2 |
| (Timor-Leste) Jaime Victor da Costa Filipe | (Timor-Leste) Zebra | 2 |
| (Serbia and Montenegro) Sead Muratovic | (Singapore) Tampines Rovers | 1 |
| (Thailand) Santi Chaiyaphuak | (Singapore) Tampines Rovers | 1 |
| (Malaysia) Irwan Fadly Idrus | (Malaysia) Pahang | 1 |
| (Malaysia) Jalaluddin Jaafar | (Malaysia) Pahang | 1 |
| (Thailand) Vimon Jancam | (Vietnam) Hoang Anh Gia Lai | 1 |
| (Vietnam) Chu Ngọc Cảnh | (Vietnam) Hoang Anh Gia Lai | 1 |
| (Vietnam) Nguyễn Văn Kiệt | (Vietnam) Hoang Anh Gia Lai | 1 |
| (Vietnam) Trần Minh Thiên | (Vietnam) Hoang Anh Gia Lai | 1 |
| (Vietnam) Dương Minh Ninh | (Vietnam) Hoang Anh Gia Lai | 1 |
| (Brunei) Mohd Saiful Rizal Awang | (Brunei) DPMM | 1 |
| (Brunei) Rosmin Kamis | (Brunei) DPMM | 1 |
| (Timor-Leste) Jose Joao Pereira | (Timor-Leste) Zebra Baucau | 1 |
| (Timor-Leste) Demofilho Marques | (Timor-Leste) Zebra Baucau | 1 |
| (Thailand) Sakda Kaewboonmee | Thailand Tobacco Monopoly | 1 |
| (United States) Michael Thach Nen | (Cambodia) Nagacorp | 1 |
