= Anuwat Nuchit =

Thai footballer (born 1986)

Personal information
- Full name: Anuwat Nuchit
- Date of birth: 4 May 1986 (age 40)
- Place of birth: Sisaket, Thailand
- Height: 1.79 m (5 ft 10 1/2 in)
- Position: Midfielder

Team information
- Current team: Sisaket
- Number: 7

Senior career*
Years	Team	Apps	(Gls)
2007–	Sisaket	49	(6)
- * Club domestic league appearances and goals as of April 13, 2010 ‡ National team caps and goals as of April 18, 2010

Anuwat Nuchit Thai: อนุวัฒน์ นุชิต is a Thai football player who played for Thailand Premier League side Sisaket including the team's Thailand Premier League seasons.
