= Suphan Hardkam =

Thai footballer (born 1986)

Personal information
- Date of birth: 2 February 1986 (age 40)
- Place of birth: Sisaket, Thailand
- Height: 1.80 m (5 ft 11 in)
- Position: Defender

Team information
- Current team: Ayutthaya
- Number: 27

Senior career*
Years	Team	Apps	(Gls)
2008–2013	Sisaket	106	(2)
2013–2014	Ubon Ratchathani	52	(0)
2015–2016	Ayutthaya	31	(1)
2017	Khonkaen	15	(1)
2018–	Ayutthaya		
- * Club domestic league appearances and goals as of April 13, 2010

Suphan Hardkam (Thai: สุพรรณ หาดคำ, born February 2, 1986) is a Thai professional footballer.

== Honours ==
=== Club ===
Ubon Ratchathani

- Thai Division 2 League Champions (1) : 2014
