= Kawin Kachendecha =

Thai coach

Personal information
- Full name: Kawin Kachendecha
- Place of birth: Thailand

Managerial career
- Years: Team
- 2008: Thailand Tobacco Monopoly
- 2007–2008: Thailand U19
- 2011–2012: RSU
- ‡ National team caps and goals as of September 19, 2008

Kawin Kachendecha is a Thai coach. He has led the side since 2008. He previously led Thailand Premier League side Thailand Tobacco Monopoly FC in 2008, but left midseason to take over the youngsters of the national team.

== Teams managed ==
- Thailand Tobacco Monopoly: 2008
- Thailand U-20: 2007-2008
- J.W. Rangsit F.C.: 2011-2012

== International experience ==
Kachendecha led the Tobacco side in the Singapore Cup.
