= 2006 Thailand Premier League =

Thai Premier League
- Season: 2006
- Dates: 28 January – 2 July
- Champions: Bangkok University
- Relegated: No Relegation
- 2007 AFC Champions League: Bangkok University FC
- 2007 AFC Cup: Osotsapa FC
- Top goalscorer: (Thailand) Pipat Thonkanya (BEC Tero Sasana) (12)
- Biggest home win: BEC Tero Sasana 8-1; Royal Thai Army
- Biggest away win: Provincial Electricity Authority 0-3 Thailand Tobacco Monopoly; Suphanburi 2-5 Thai Honda
- Highest scoring: BEC Tero Sasana 8-1; Royal Thai Army (9 goals)

The 2006 Thai Premier League had 12 teams. No clubs would be relegated as the league would be expanded to 16 teams for the 2007 season. Two teams promoted from the rival Pro League and two clubs from Thailand Division 1 League. The official name of the league at this time was Thailand Premier League.

== Member clubs ==
Locations of the Thai Premier League 2006 teams
- Bangkok Bank
- Bangkok University
- BEC Tero Sasana
- Chonburi (promoted from Provincial League)
- Krung Thai Bank
- Osotsapa M-150
- Port Authority of Thailand
- Provincial Electricity Authority
- Royal Thai Army (promoted from Division 1)
- Suphanburi (promoted from Provincial League)
- Thai Honda (promoted from Division 1)
- Thailand Tobacco Monopoly

== Final league table ==
Pos	Team	Pld	W	D	L	GF	GA	GD	Pts	Qualification
1	Bangkok University	22	11	6	5	25	17	+8	39	Champion and Qualification for the 2007 AFC Champions League
2	Osotsapa	22	10	8	4	35	20	+15	38	Qualification for the 2007 AFC Cup
3	BEC Tero Sasana	22	9	9	4	32	14	+18	36	
4	Tobacco Monopoly (Note: Defending Champion)	22	9	8	5	30	24	+6	35	
5	Bangkok Bank	22	10	4	8	26	28	−2	34	
6	Royal Thai Army (Note: Promoted from last season)	22	7	9	6	31	38	−7	30	
7	Port Authority	22	7	7	8	21	28	−7	28	
8	Chonburi	22	5	12	5	29	28	+1	27	
9	Krung Thai Bank	22	5	10	7	22	26	−4	25	
10	PEA	22	6	4	12	23	32	−9	22	
11	Thai Honda	22	4	9	9	23	26	−3	21	
12	Suphanburi	22	4	4	14	18	34	−16	16	

Source: rsssf.com
Rules for classification: 1st points; 2nd head-to-head; 3rd goal difference; 4th goals scored

== Season notes ==
- In this season, the winner and runner-up of the Provincial League, Chonburi FC and Suphanburi FC began the practice of moving to play in the Thai Premier League.

== Kor Royal Cup ==
The Kor Royal Cup was an end of season match between the two clubs that finished first and second in the final Premier League standings.

Osotsapa, who came second in the Premier League, beat league Champions Bangkok University 2–1.

== Queen's Cup ==
2nd Level Royal Thai Navy upset the odds when they won the 32nd edition of the Queen's Cup defeating Krung Thai Bank 1–0.

== Asian representation ==
- League champions and runners up Thailand Tobacco Monopoly and PEA should have taken part in the 2006 Asian Champions League, but both clubs failed to meet the respective time frame to send in squad lists. Both teams were duly disqualified from the competition. Rumor was rife that neither club wished to take part due to the financial costs.
- Chonburi reached the final of the Singapore Cup in their first ever participation. They were within one minute of lifting the silverware against Tampines Rovers but succumbed in extra time to lose 3–2. Provincial Electricity Authority also took part in the competition but got knocked out in the first round against Woodlands Wellington.

== Annual awards ==
=== Coach of the Year ===
- (Thailand) Somchai Subpherm - Bangkok University

=== Player of the year ===
- (Thailand) Punnarat Klinsukon - Bangkok University

=== Top scorer ===
- (Thailand) Pipat Thonkanya - 12 GoalsBEC Tero Sasana

== Champions ==
The league champion was Bangkok University. It was the team's first title.

Preceded by Thai Premier League; 2004/05	Thai Premier League; 2006; Bangkok University	Succeeded by Thai Premier League; 2007
