= 1999–2000 Thailand Provincial League =

Thailand Provincial League
- Season: 1999–2000
- Champions: Sisaket

The 1999–2000 Pro League Football League for the five-year pilot of the Football Association of Thailand. The management team of the tournament in the first 3 years there will be no relegation. The Organising Committee has selected the teams from various sports associations in each sector.

- Northern Region had Nakhon Sawan, Chiangmai
- North Eastern Region had Sisaket, Udon Thani, Nakhon Ratchasima
- Central Region had Bangkok, Nakhon Pathom, Suphanburi
- Southern Region had Satun, Surat Thani, Pattani, Songkhla

== League table ==
Pos	Team	Pld	W	D	L	GF	GA	GD	Pts
1	Sisaket	22	14	5	3	50	25	+25	47
2	Suphanburi	22	15	1	6	63	32	+31	46
3	Satun	22	13	6	3	48	32	+16	45
4	Udon Thani	22	12	2	8	35	26	+9	38
5	Nakhon Sawan	22	11	4	7	34	23	+11	37
6	Nakhon Pathom	22	8	7	7	34	24	+10	31
7	Bangkok	22	6	6	10	32	37	−5	24
8	Songkhla	22	6	6	10	30	36	−6	24
9	Surat Thani	22	5	8	9	28	37	−9	23
10	Nakhon Ratchasima	22	5	7	10	30	37	−7	22
11	Chiangmai	22	5	4	13	21	45	−24	19
12	Pattani	22	2	4	16	16	65	−49	10
