= Daniel Blanco (Argentine footballer) =

Argentine retired footballer

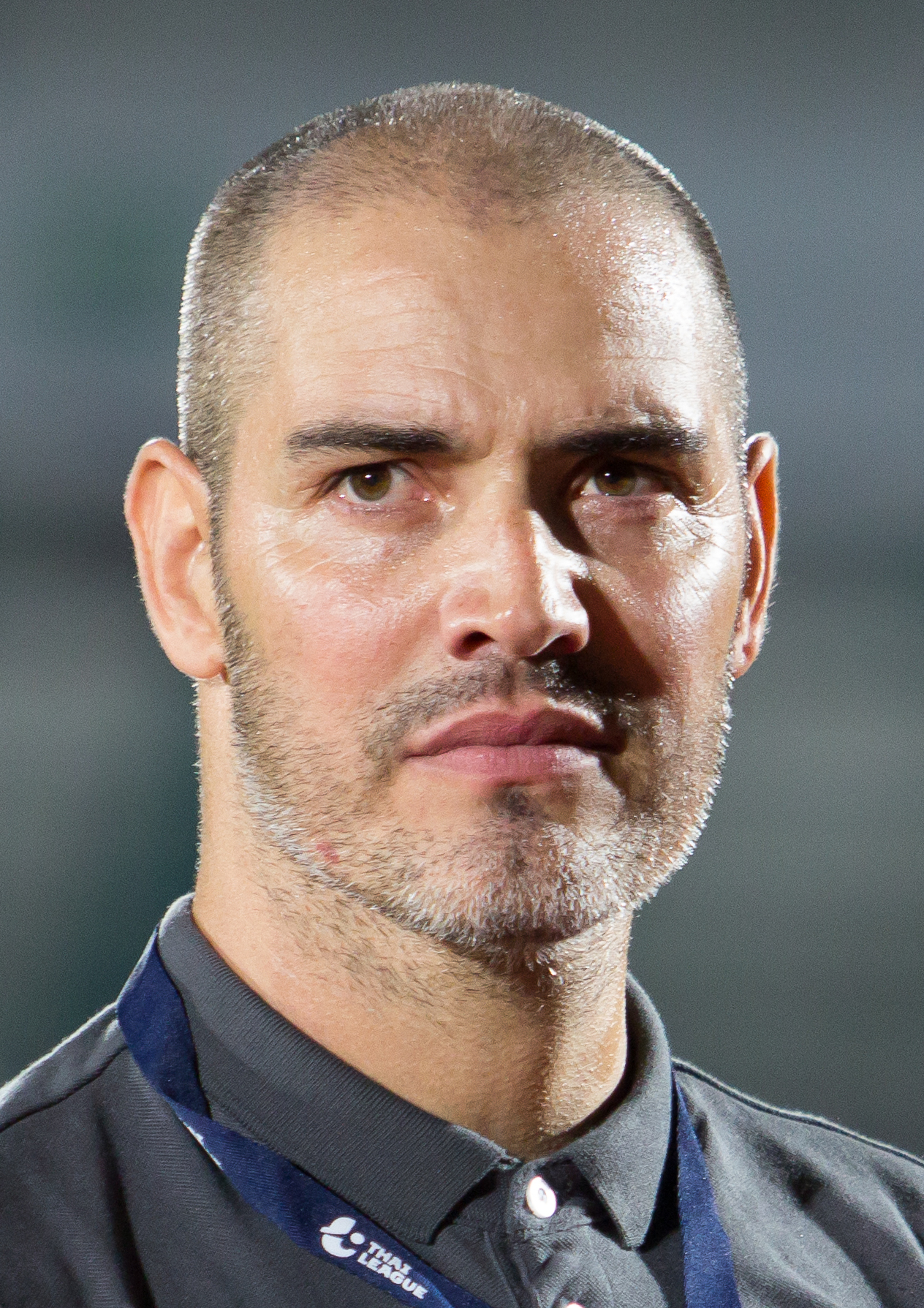
- Daniel Blanco with Army United in 2017

Personal information
- Full name: Daniel Alberto Blanco
- Date of birth: 30 July 1978 (age 48)
- Place of birth: Córdoba, Argentina
- Height: 1.86 m (6 ft 1 in)
- Position: Centre back

Senior career*
Years	Team	Apps	(Gls)
1993–1998	Newell's Old Boys	17	(1)
1999	Universidad Católica	27	(3)
2000	Bolívar	32	(8)
2001	Racing de Córdoba	21	(2)
2001	Everton de Viña del Mar	14	(1)
2002	Ancona	22	(2)
2002	Al-Shabab	16	(4)
2003	Venezia	30	(3)
2004–2006	Alghero	76	(16)
2007–2008	Ethnikos Achna	45	(4)
2008–2009	F91 Dudelange	4	(0)
2009–2011	Alki Larnaca	71	(9)
2011	Ermis Aradippou	13	(1)
2012–2013	Army United	47	(3)
2014–2015	Juventud Alianza	22	(1)
2015–2016	ASIL Lysi	26	(2)
2016–2017	Ormideia FC	29	(1)
Total		512	(61)

International career
	Argentina U17	12	(0)
	Argentina U19	6	(1)
	Argentina U20	8	(1)

Managerial career
- 2017: Army United
- 2017–2018: Krabi
- 2018–2019: Army United
- 2021: Udon Thani
- 2021–2022: Khon Kaen
- 2022: Chainat Hornbill
- 2025: Customs United
- 2026–: Tiamo Hirakata
- * Club domestic league appearances and goals

Daniel Alberto Blanco (born July 30, 1978) is an Argentine retired footballer who played as a centre back and football coach for Japan Football League club FC Tiamo Hirakata.

== Honours ==
=== Club ===
F91 Dudelange

- Luxembourg National Division (1): 2008-09
