= Anan Amornkiat =

Thai football coach

Personal information
- Full name: Anan Amornkiat
- Date of birth: 10 June 1945 (age 81)
- Place of birth: Thailand

Managerial career
- Years: Team
- 2000–2004: Tobacco Monopoly F.C.
- 2006–2007: Bangkok Bank FC
- 2007–2008: Hoang Anh Gia Lai
- 2009–2010: Rajnavy Rayong
- 2010: Chanthaburi (Technical Manager)
- 2013: Rayong United
- ‡ National team caps and goals as of April 26, 2013

Anan Amornkiat is a Thai football coach who is currently the consultant of Thailand U-23.

He previously served as coach of Bangkok Bank FC, signing a two-year contract in June 2005.

== Honours ==
Manager

Tobacco Monopoly

- Thailand Division 1 League Champions (1): 2000
