= Nakarin Fuplook =

Thai footballer (born 1983)

Personal information
- Full name: Nakarin Fuplook
- Date of birth: 14 November 1983 (age 42)
- Place of birth: Lampang, Thailand
- Height: 1.76 m (5 ft 9 1/2 in)
- Position: Defender

Senior career*
Years	Team	Apps	(Gls)
2002–2004	Raj-Vithi FC	34	(0)
2005–2006	Bangkok Bank FC	29	(3)
2007–2009	BEC Tero Sasana	44	(1)
2010	Sisaket	11	(0)
2011	RBAC	19	(1)
2012	Air Force Central	10	(0)
2013	Rayong United	14	(0)
2014	Saraburi	21	(2)
2017	Chanthaburi	6	(0)
Total		188	(7)

International career
2004	Thailand	1	(0)
- * Club domestic league appearances and goals

Nakarin Fuplook (born 14 November 1983) is a former Thai professional footballer who played as a centre-back.
