= Kor Royal Cup stampede =

Crowd crush disaster in Bangkok

Coordinates: 13.745521°N 100.525681°E

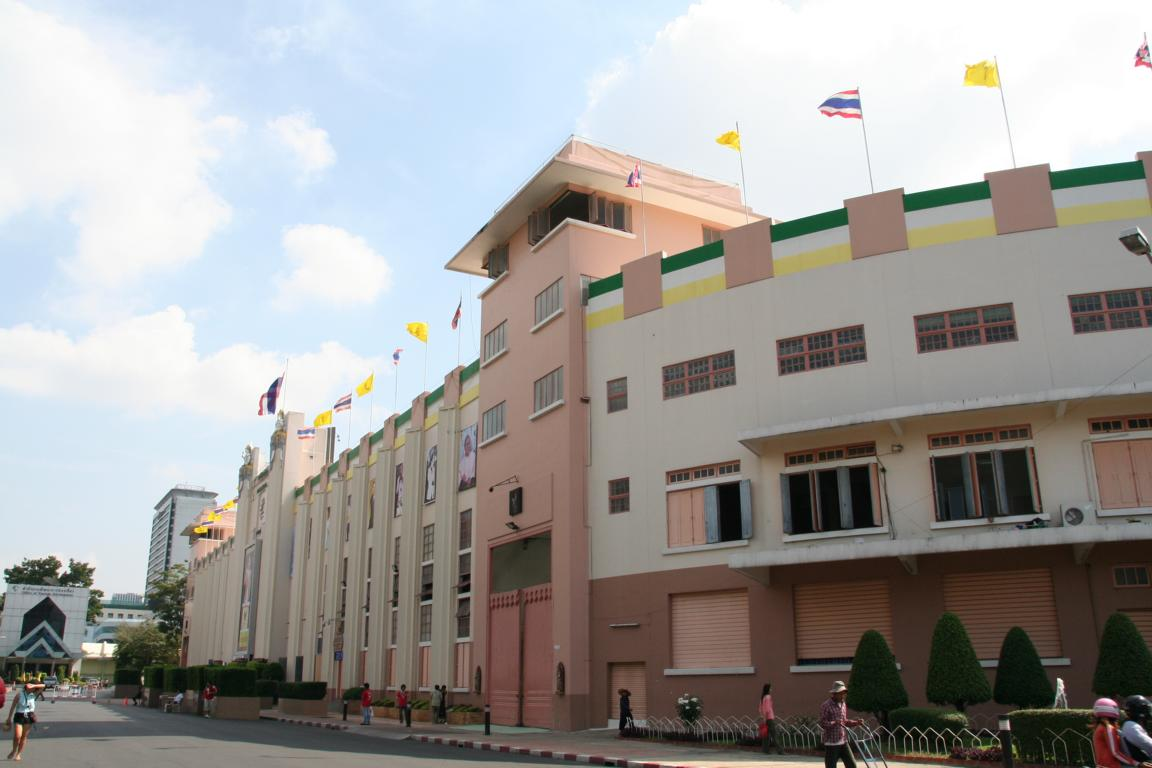
- Suphachalasai Stadium, the site of stampede
- Date: 20 February 2010
- Place: Suphachalasai Stadium, Bangkok, Thailand
- Cause: Thai Port supporters unhappy with the match result
- Injured: 10+

The Kor Royal Cup stampede was a crowd crush that occurred on 20 February 2010 at Suphachalasai Stadium in Bangkok, Thailand during a Kor Royal Cup match between Muangthong United and Thai Port.

== Events ==
Koné Mohamed scored with a header from a Piyachart free kick in the 67th minute, his first goal in a Muangthong United shirt after he moved from Chonburi, and Dagno Siaka scored with a header in the 81st minute.

Thai Port's Pongpipat Kamnuan attempted to convince his fans (the Khlong Toei Army) that the second goal came from a handball; they agreed with him, and feeling that the second goal should have been disallowed, they started throwing firecrackers and bottles onto the pitch, and a pitch invasion then occurred in which Thai Port fans attacked fleeing Muangthong United fans (the Ultra Muangthong), Muangthong United players, officials and stadium security personnel.

Thai Port fans later set fire to Muangthong United's team flag and a team shirt in the centre of the pitch.

== Aftermath ==
The match was abandoned and the Kor Royal Cup was awarded to Muangthong United. The actions of the Thai Port fans could not have come at a worse time for the club, as they were preparing to host the Vietnamese champions, Đà Nẵng in their 2010 AFC Cup Group H opener at the National Stadium on 24 February.

At least ten fans were injured, nine from Muangthong United and one from Thai Port.
