= 2004–05 Thai League =

Thai Premier League
- Season: 2004–05
- Dates: 28 November 2004 – 7 May 2005
- Champions: Thailand Tobacco Monopoly
- Relegated: TOT; Royal Thai Navy
- 2006 AFC Champions League: Thailand Tobacco Monopoly FC; Provincial Electricity Authority FC
- Top goalscorer: Supakit Jinajai (PEA); Sarayoot Chaikamdee (Port Authority of Thailand) (10)
- Biggest home win: Bangkok Bank 4-0; Bangkok University; Osotsapa 5-1; Bangkok Bank; Thailand Tobacco Monopoly 4-0; Royal Thai Navy; Osotsapa M-150 4-0; Royal Thai Navy
- Biggest away win: Royal Thai Navy 0-3 Osotsapa; Royal Thai Navy 0-3 Bangkok Bank; TOT 0-3 Osotsapa; Port Authority of Thailand 0-3 TOT; BEC Tero Sasana 0-3; Port Authority of Thailand; Port Authority of Thailand 1-4 Thailand Tobacco Monopoly
- Highest scoring: TOT 3-4 Port Authority of Thailand (7 goals)

The 2004-05 Thai Premier League had 10 teams. Two clubs would be relegated as the league would be expanded to 12 teams for the 2006 season. Two teams promoted from the rival Provincial League and two clubs from Thailand Division 1 League. The team that finished in 8th position would play in a relegation play-off.

== Member clubs ==
- Bangkok Bank
- Bangkok University
- BEC Tero Sasana
- Krung Thai Bank
- Osotsapa M-150
- Port Authority of Thailand
- Provincial Electricity Authority (promoted from Division 1)
- Royal Thai Navy
- Thailand Tobacco Monopoly
- TOT (promoted from Division 1)
Locations of the Thai Premier League 2004–05 teams

== Final league table ==
Pos	Team	Pld	W	D	L	GF	GA	GD	Pts	Qualification or relegation
1	Tobacco Monopoly	18	9	7	2	26	11	+15	34	Champion and Qualification for the 2006 AFC Champions League
2	PEA (Note: Promoted from last season)	18	9	5	4	23	19	+4	32	Qualification for the 2006 AFC Champions League
3	Osotsapa	18	9	5	4	34	20	+14	32	
4	Port Authority	18	7	5	6	26	27	−1	26	
5	Krung Thai Bank (Note: Defending champion)	18	6	7	5	24	24	0	25	
6	BEC Tero Sasana	18	6	7	5	19	18	+1	25	
7	Bangkok University	18	5	7	6	16	21	−5	22	
8	Bangkok Bank	18	5	5	8	25	28	−3	20	
9	TOT	18	3	7	8	20	25	−5	16	Relegation spot
10	Royal Thai Navy	18	3	1	14	11	33	−22	10	Relegation spot

Source: rsssf.com
Rules for classification: 1st points; 2nd head-to-head; 3rd goal difference; 4th goals scored

== Kings Trophy ==
The King's Trophy was an end of season match between the two clubs that finished first and second in the final Premier League standings.

Thailand Tobacco Monopoly, who won the Premier League, beat league runners up Provincial Electricity Authority 4-1.

== Queens Cup ==
The Queen's Cup was postponed because of lack of sponsorship, will be held next year but with reduced prize money.

== Asian Representation ==
- In the 2005 Asian Champions League, a competition described as competition restricted to 14 countries considered 'mature' in the so-called 'Vision Asia' paper of AFC President Mohamed Bin Hammam. The so-called 14 'developing' countries have their clubs relegated to the AFC Cup, while the clubs from the 'emerging' countries are dumped into the new Presidents Cup.
- BEC Tero Sasana and Krung Thai Bank would again be the Thai representatives and would also fail to qualify for the knockout stages. Krung Thai once again came in second place in their group, but a full 9 points behind group winners Busan I'Park. BEC would once again slump to bottom position on 1 point.
- Thailand Tobacco Monopoly took part in the 2nd edition of ASEAN Club Championship this season but failed to make it out of the group stage, drawing one game and losing the other two games.

== Annual awards ==
=== Coach of the Year ===
- (Brazil) Jose Alves Borges - Thailand Tobacco Monopoly

=== Player of the year ===
- (Brazil) José Carlos Da Silva - Thailand Tobacco Monopoly

=== Top scorer ===
- (Thailand) Supakit Jinajai - 10 Goals Provincial Electricity Authority
- Sarayoot Chaikamdee - 10 Goals Port Authority of Thailand

== Champions ==
Champions
Tobacco Monopoly
1st title

Preceded by Thai League; 2003–04	Thai Premier League; 2004–05; Thailand Tobacco Monopoly	Succeeded by Thailand Premier League; 2006
