= Jose Alves Borges =

Brazilian football manager

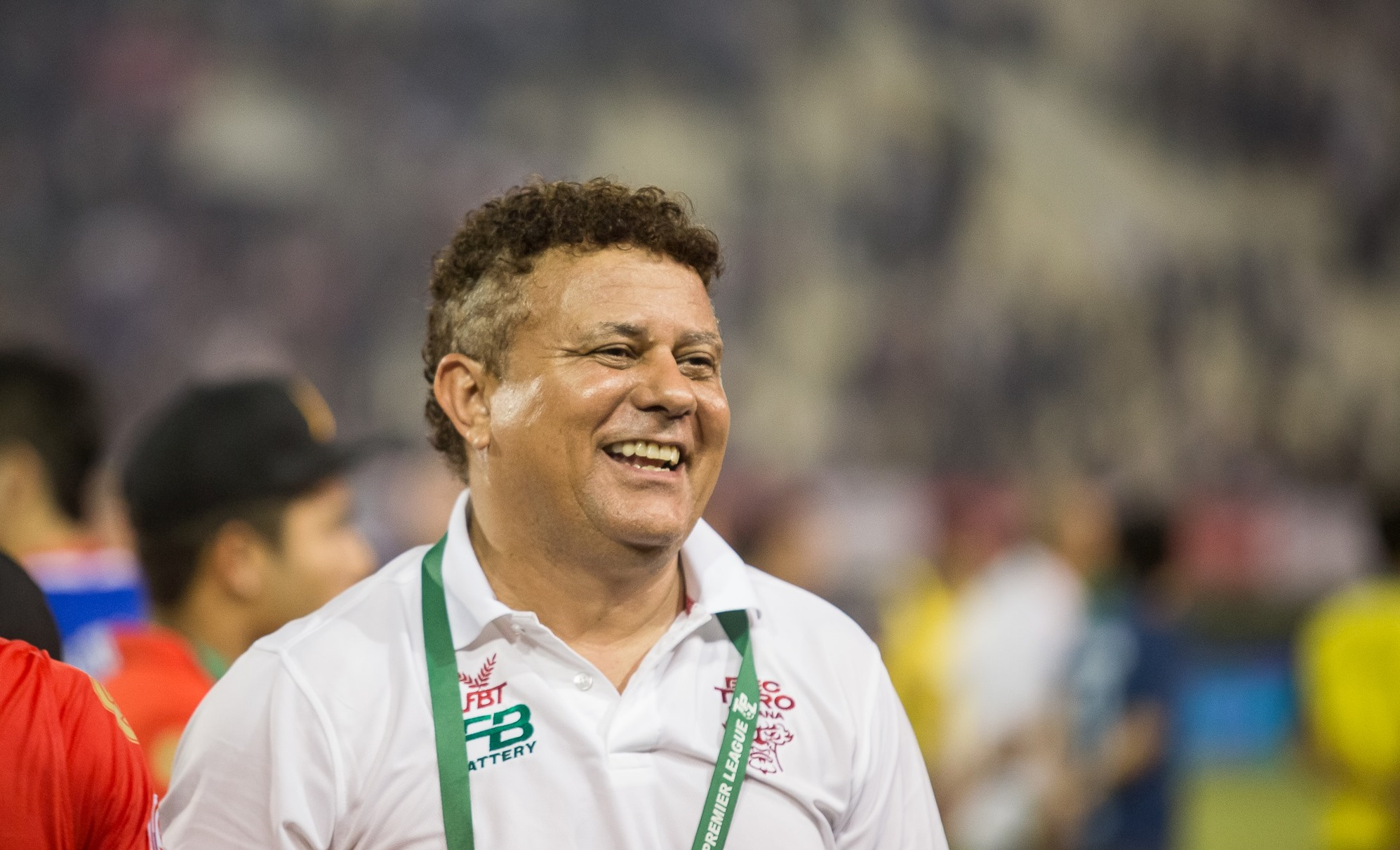
- Borges managing BEC Tero Sasana in 2013

Personal information
- Full name: Jose Alves Borges
- Date of birth: 12 October 1958 (age 68)
- Place of birth: São Paulo, Brazil

Team information
- Current team: Muangthong United (head coach)

Managerial career
- Years: Team
- 1993–1996: A.C. Levae
- 1997: Sporst Net/Sao Paulo
- 1997–1998: Palestra SB
- 1998–1999: Shanghai Greenland Shenhua (youth)
- 2000–2003: São Paulo (youth)
- 2004–2006: Thailand Tobacco Monopoly
- 2006–2007: PEA
- 2008: Sao Paulo FC/ IAM Sports
- 2009: Rajpracha
- 2010: TTM Customs
- 2011–2012: Yadanarbon
- 2013: BBCU
- 2013–2014: BEC Tero Sasana
- 2015: PTT Rayong
- 2016–2018: Buriram United (youth)
- 2018–2019: Chiangrai United
- 2021–2025: Nagaworld (technical director)
- 2025: Police Tero
- 2025: Police Tero (Head of Youth Development)
- 2025: Bangkok
- 2026–: Muangthong United

Jose Alves Borges is a Brazilian football manager, who is the head coach of the Thai League 2 club Muangthong United. He is known to have managed many other successful teams especially in the Thai Premier League. He was named the Best Head Coach by the Thai Premier League in the 2004-2005 season and by the Myanmar National League in 2012.
