= Jakkapan Prommaros =

Thai footballer (born 1983)

Personal information
- Full name: Jakkapan Prommaros
- Date of birth: 25 August 1983 (age 43)
- Place of birth: Suphanburi, Thailand
- Height: 1.78 m (5 ft 10 in)
- Position: Midfielder

Team information
- Current team: Sisaket
- Number: 16

Senior career*
Years	Team	Apps	(Gls)
2008–	Sisaket	39	(4)
- * Club domestic league appearances and goals as of April 13, 2010 ‡ National team caps and goals as of April 18, 2010

Jakkapan Prommaros is a Thai football player who currently plays for Thailand Premier League side Sisaket.
