= Ocean 1 Tower =

Ocean One
- Interactive map of the Ocean One area

General information
- Status: Never built
- Location: Jomtien Beach, Pattaya, Thailand
- Construction started: 2006 (planned)
- Estimated completion: 2009 (proposed)

Height
- Height: 367 metres (1,204 ft)
- Roof: 367 metres (1,204 ft)

Technical details
- Floor count: 91

Design and construction
- Architect: Woods Bagot
- Developer: Siam Best Enterprises Co. Ltd.
- Structural engineer: Connell Wagner

Website
- Official website

Ocean One was a proposed skyscraper intended for construction at Jomtien Beach, located near Pattaya, Thailand. The planned structure was designed to reach a height of 367 metres (1,204 ft) with 91 floors and a total of 587 residential units. The proposed site lies just 250 meters from one of Asia's most popular beaches. If completed, Ocean One would have claimed the title of the tallest building in Thailand.

The architectural firm, Woods Bagot, known for designing the Q1 in Australia, which was once the tallest residential building worldwide, was responsible for the overall design of Ocean One. Noteworthy challenges related to wind engineering and earthquake engineering were to be addressed by the structural engineer firm Connell Wagner before any construction could commence. K-TECH was intended to be the contractor for the project.

The vision for Ocean One included cutting-edge technology and luxury amenities, with a strong emphasis on environmental sustainability. The building was designed to feature high security measures, a 24-hour medical clinic, and 13 high-speed elevators capable of waiting no longer than 18 seconds. The ninth floor was dedicated to recreational activities, including swimming pools, saunas, spas, gymnasiums, and a running track. Additionally, a two-level shopping plaza was planned for the building's rear.

The developer, Siam Best Enterprises Co. Ltd., estimated that the construction of Ocean One would take four years, starting in 2006 and concluding by 2009. However, delays arose due to a court case against the developers. Despite the initiation of sales for apartments within the tower, construction had remained on hold since November 2015.

== See also ==
- List of tallest buildings in Thailand
