= Prayad Boonya =

Thai footballer (born 1979)

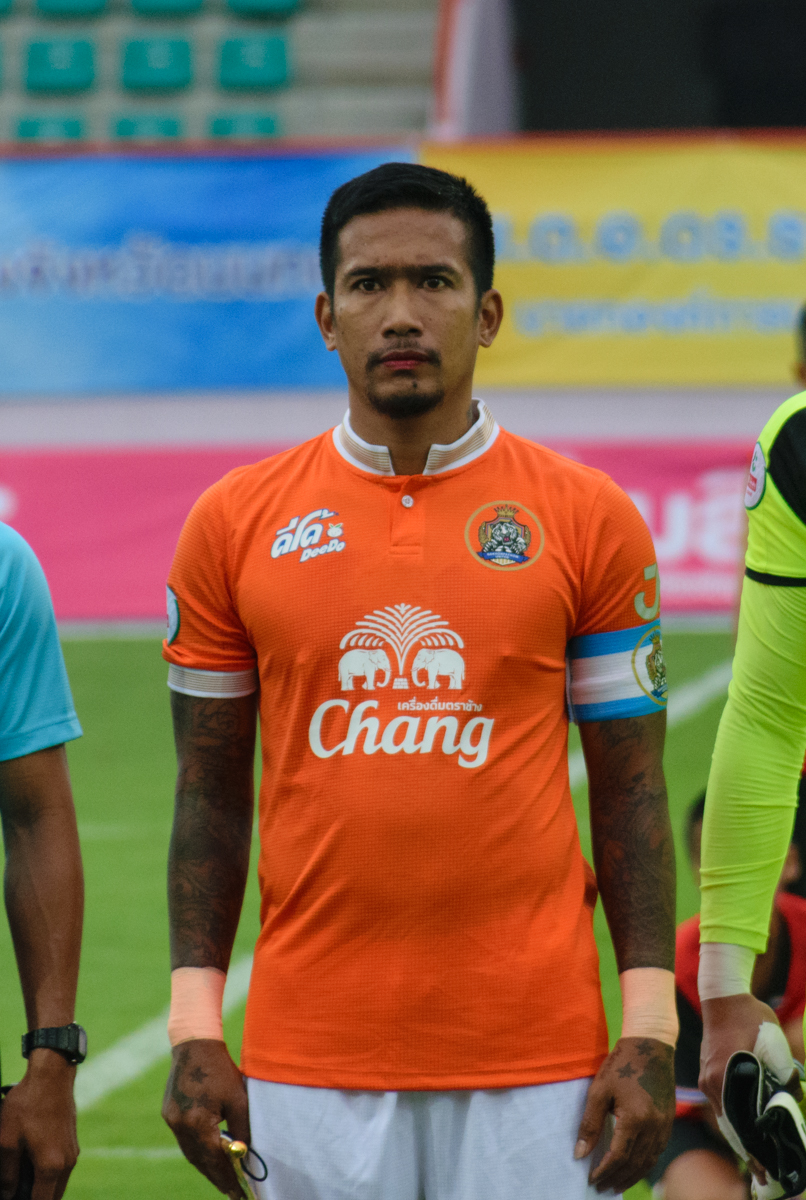

Personal information
- Full name: Prayad Boonya
- Date of birth: 15 November 1979 (age 46)
- Place of birth: Ratchaburi, Thailand
- Height: 1.69 m (5 ft 7 in)
- Position: Defender

Youth career
- 1996–1998: Ratchaburi

Senior career*
Years	Team	Apps	(Gls)
2007–2009	Nakhon Pathom	70	(8)
2010–2011	Samut Songkhram	49	(6)
2012–2015	Ratchaburi Mitr Phol	68	(7)
2014	→ PTT Rayong (loan)	6	(0)
2015	→ RBAC (loan)	12	(0)
2016	Loei City	4	(0)
2017	Surat Thani	3	(0)
2017	Kopoon Warrior	10	(0)
2018	Nakhon Pathom United	21	(2)
2021	Grakcu Sai Mai United	9	(0)
2021	Kasetsart	6	(0)
Total		258	(23)

International career^{‡}
2012–2013	Thailand	5	(1)
- * Club domestic league appearances and goals as of April 13, 2010 ‡ National team caps and goals as of April 18, 2010

Prayad Boonya (Thai: ประหยัด บุญญา, born November 15, 1979) is a Thai retired professional footballer who played as a centre-back.

== International career ==
He was part of the 2012 AFF Suzuki Cup Thailand squad under the leadership of Winfried Schäfer.

== Honours ==
Ratchaburi

- Thai Division 1 League: 2012 Champion

== International goals ==
#	Date	Venue	Opponent	Score	Result	Competition
1.	November 8, 2012	SCG Stadium, Nonthaburi, Thailand	Malaysia	1–0	2–0	Friendly
