= Amnart Chalermchaowarit =

Thai footballer (born 1951)

Personal information
- Full name: Amnart Chalermchaowarit
- Date of birth: 16 July 1951 (age 75)
- Place of birth: Saraburi, Thailand
- Height: 1.82 m (6 ft 0 in)
- Position: Defender

Senior career*
Years	Team	Apps	(Gls)
1971–1977	Raj-Vithi		
1978	Osotspa		
1979–1986	Thai Port		

International career
1971–1985	Thailand	45	(3)

Managerial career
- 1996–1997: Army United
- 2007: Army United
- 2012: Army United
- 2015: Army United (caretaker)
- * Club domestic league appearances and goals as of 24 September 2012

Amnart Chalermchaowarit (Thai อำนาจ เฉลิมชวลิต) is a Thai former footballer. He is one of the legend of Thai football who played in 1971–1985 for Thailand national football team, He got the nickname "Colonel Iron Bones".
