= Pongphan Wongsuwan =

Thai football manager

Personal information
- Full name: Pongphan Wongsuwan
- Date of birth: 10 January 1951
- Place of birth: Bangkok, Thailand
- Date of death: 4 February 2012 (aged 61)
- Place of death: Bangkok, Thailand

Managerial career
- Years: Team
- 1982–1984: Krung Thai Bank FC
- 1987–1988: Krung Thai Bank FC
- 1988–1997: TOT FC
- 1997: BEC Tero Sasana
- 1998: Thailand (U-17)
- 1998–2009: TOT FC
- ‡ National team caps and goals as of July 3, 2008

Pongphan Wongsuwan (10 January 1951 - 4 February 2012) nicknamed Kok, was a manager of Thailand Premier League side TOT FC. He led the side to the Thailand Division 1 League title in 2003 and the Thailand Provincial League title in 2006. In the 2010 season he was the technical Director of Army United F.C. He was the younger brother of Prawit Wongsuwan, former Thailand's Minister of Defence and former National Police Chief Patcharawat Wongsuwan.

He died in February 2012.

== Clubs managed ==
- BEC Tero Sasana: 1997
- TOT FC: 1998–2009

== International Managed ==
- U-17 Thailand: 1998

== Honours ==
As manager

- Kor Royal Cup Champions : 1988 with Krung Thai Bank FC
- Thailand Coach of the Year 1988
- AFC U-17 Championship Champions : 1998 with U-17 Thailand
- Thai FA Cup Champions : 1993 with TOT FC
- AFC Coach of the Year 1996
- Thailand Division 1 League Champions : 2003 with TOT FC
- Thailand Provincial League Champions: 2006 with TOT FC
