= Somchai Subpherm =

Thai footballer and manager

Personal information
- Full name: Somchai Subpherm
- Date of birth: 8 March 1962 (age 64)
- Place of birth: Chonburi, Thailand
- Height: 1.71 m (5 ft 7 1/2 in)
- Positions: Attacking midfielder; second striker

Youth career
- 1978–1979: Krung Thai Bank

Senior career*
Years	Team	Apps	(Gls)
1980–1988	Krung Thai Bank	153	(47)
1989–1990	Cosmo Oil Yokkaichi FC	15	(2)
1991–1995	TOT	70	(19)
2013	TOT	1	(0)
Total		239	(68)

International career^{‡}
1980–1990	Thailand	66	(20)

Managerial career
- 1996–2000: TOT (assistance)
- 2001–2009: Bangkok University
- 2011–2015: TOT
- 2015: Port
- 2016: Osotspa Samut Prakan
- 2019: Kohkwang
- 2022–2023: Chanthaburi
- * Club domestic league appearances and goals ‡ National team caps and goals as of June 28, 2008

Somchai Subpherm (Thai: สมชาย ทรัพย์เพิ่ม; born March 8, 1962) is a Thai football coach and former footballer.

Somchai lead Bangkok University to the league champions in 2006 and then took them on their first adventure of Asian Football in the AFC Champions League the following year.

== Honours ==
=== Manager ===
Bangkok University F.C.

- Thailand Premier League Champions (1) : 2006
