= Piyawat Thongman =

Thai footballer

Personal information
- Full name: Piyawat Thongman
- Date of birth: 23 October 1982 (age 44)
- Place of birth: Nakhon Pathom, Thailand
- Height: 1.78 m (5 ft 10 in)
- Position: Striker

Youth career
- Bangkok United

Senior career*
Years	Team	Apps	(Gls)
1999–2001	Bangkok University	39	(13)
2002–2004	Krung Thai Bank	43	(15)
2005–2006	PEA	34	(10)
2007–2008	Nakhon Pathom	38	(6)
2009	Bangkok United	2	(0)
2009	Surat Thani	7	(1)
2010–2011	Sisaket	18	(8)
2012–2013	Saraburi	24	(5)
2014	Sisaket	10	(1)
2015–2018	Rayong	16	(1)
Total		231	(60)

International career
2003	Thailand U23		
2002–2003	Thailand	8	(2)
Medal record
Thailand under-23
Sea Games
Gold medal – first place	Sea Games 2003	Football
- * Club domestic league appearances and goals as of 14 November 2008

Piyawat Thongman (Thai: ปิยะวัฒน์ ทองแม้น) is a former professional footballer from Thailand.

He has played several times for the Thailand national football team, including appearances in several 2006 FIFA World Cup qualifying matches.

== Honours ==
=== International ===
Thailand U-23

- Sea Games Gold Medal (1); 2003

== International goals ==
#	Date	Venue	Opponent	Score	Result	Competition
1.	November 21, 2003	Bangkok, Thailand	Uzbekistan	3–0	4–1	2004 Asian Cup Qualification
