= Narong Suwannachot =

Thai football manager

Personal information
- Full name: Narong Suwannachot
- Date of birth: 27 February 1960 (age 66)
- Place of birth: Thailand

Managerial career
- Years: Team
- 2002–2003: Krung Thai Bank
- 2010–2011: TOT
- 2012: TTM Customs
- 2013: Sisaket
- 2013: Sisaket United (technical director)
- 2014: Ubon Ratchathani
- 2017: Uttaradit

Narong Suwannachot (Thai: ณรงค์ สุวรรณโชติ; RTGS: Narong Suwannachot), is a Thai football manager.
