= Sri Nakhon Lamduan Stadium =

Football stadium in Thailand

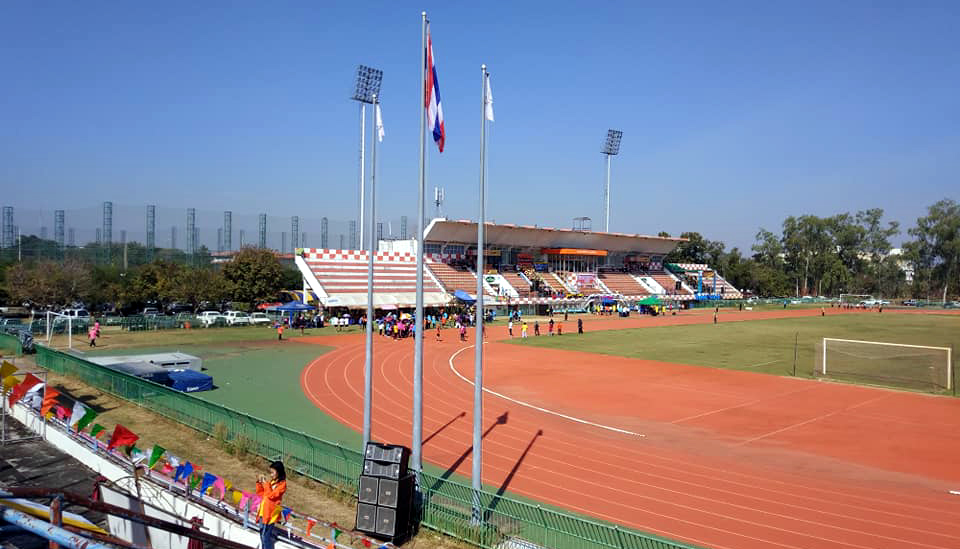
- Interactive map of Sri Nakhon Lamduan Stadium
- Location: Nam Kham, Mueang Sisaket, Sisaket, Thailand
- Coordinates: 15°06′02″N 104°20′27″E
- Owner: Thailand National Sports University Sisaket Campus
- Operator: Thailand National Sports University Sisaket Campus
- Capacity: 9,500

Tenants
- Sisaket (2007–2011), (2013–2022); Sisaket United (2012–present)

Sri Nakhon Lamduan Stadium (Thai: สนามกีฬาศรีนครลำดวน หรือ สนามกีฬามหาวิทยาลัยการกีฬาแห่งชาติ วิทยาเขตศรีสะเกษ) is a football stadium bearing the traditional name of the city of Sisaket in Thailand. It is the home stadium of Sisaket United of the Thai League 2. The stadium holds 9,500 spectators.

== Historical tenants ==
Tenants of Sri Nakhon Lamduan Stadium have been Thai professional football clubs as follows.

- Sisaket in 2007–2011, 2013–2022
- Sisaket United in 2012–present
