= TOT S.C. =

Football team in Thailand

TOT SC ทีโอที เอสซี
- Full name: TOT Sport Club ทีโอที สปอร์ต คลับ
- Founded: 1954; as Telecom of Thailand Football Club
- Dissolved: 2016
- Ground: TOT Stadium Chaeng Watthana; Lak Si, Bangkok, Thailand
- Capacity: 5,000
- Owner: TOT Public Company Limited
| Home colours | Away colours |

TOT Sport Club (Thai: ทีโอที สปอร์ต คลับ) is a Thai defunct football club based in Lak Si district in northern Bangkok which represents the national telecommunications company, TOT Public Company Limited. TOT originally stands for the Telephone Organization of Thailand, the former name of the company at the time before their privatization. TOT's football team is a member of Football Association of Thailand (FAT) and a co-founder of the Thai Premier League. TOT S.C. was dissolved in 2016.

== History ==
TOT SC is a founding member of the Thai Premier League in 1996/97 season and came second in the regular-season championship but was defeated by Bangkok Bank F.C. in the semi-final Championship Playoffs. This has so far proved to be TOT's best campaign.

Besides being relegated to the Thailand Division 1 League in 2003, they have more or less been a middle-ranking team, yet to break into the top four since 1996/97. They have been relegated on two occasions, bouncing back to the top flight at the first time of asking and claiming the Division One championship in the 2003/04 season.

Notable other achievements have been winning the Thai FA Cup in 1993 and the now-defunct Pro League in 2006 with their reserve team.

The accomplishment in the early days of the club is honorably credited to the first well-known coach Pongphan Wongsuwan.

=== Ownership dispute ===
In 2010 the club was taken over by Piroj Suwannachavee and renamed the team as TOT-CAT FC. CAT Telecom, another Thai government telecommunication company, joined the club namely as an owner. In 2011 The Football Association of Thailand (FAT) and Thai Premier League (TPL) were called to settle a dispute between original owners TOT and the newly formed TOT-CAT FC. They ruled in favor of TOT and the club will revert to the original. Presently TOT changes their football club's name officially to TOT SC (TOT Sport Club).

=== Club home ===
At the start of the 2009 season, TOT relocated from the central Nonthaburi province to the Western Kanchanaburi province to try and generate a bigger fan base.

They left their previous Namkaejon Stadium for the 13,000 capacity Kleab Bua Stadium, which would be used as their home stadium from 2009 onwards.

By the way, they stayed in Kanchanaburi province only lasted one season and then returned to Nonthaburi province to ground share with Muangthong United F.C. at the Yamaha Stadium (SCG Stadium currently). The move failed to attract new supporters and TOT-CAT fans were regularly outnumbered by the away support at their home games during the 2010 Thai Premier League. They used the Yamaha Stadium as a home until the end of the first leg of TPL 2011.

After a few years of construction, their newly 5000-seat stadium called TOT Stadium (located in TOT HQ., Laksi District) is completed and ready for use as the home stadium since the TPL 2011 second leg. The club training ground and club office is located at TOT Training Center or TOT Academy in Nonthaburi province around 15 kilometers away from their home stadium.

=== Asian competition ===
TOT has played in Asian competition only once, representing Thailand in the 1994–95 Asian Cup Winners' Cup after winning the 1993 Thai FA Cup. In the first round, they met East Bengal of India, dispatching them 4–1 in the first leg; they were awarded a walkover tie in the return when East Bengal withdrew. In the second round, they met Vietnamese opposition Quang Nam Danang, winning through 8–2 over two legs. In the last round, before East Asia met West Asia, TOT came up against Kuala Lumpur FA of Malaysia. This was a much tougher match and they came through in extra time. This took TOT through to the semi-finals, held in the UAE, where they met Japanese powerhouse Yokohama Flügels. Flügels defeated TOT 4–2 in the one-legged neutral-venue matchup. But, TOT still had one game to go in the third/fourth-place match against not only Saudi giants, but Asian giants Al Ittihad. The match went to penalties, with Ittihad winning 4–2.

== Stadium and locations by season records ==
| Coordinates | Location | Stadium | Capacity | Year |
|---|---|---|---|---|
| 13°53′49″N 100°30′16″E | Nonthaburi | Namkaejon Stadium | ? | 2007–2008 |
| 14°02′59″N 99°30′10″E | Kanchanaburi | Kanchanaburi Province Stadium | 13,000 | 2009 |
| 13°55′05″N 100°32′51″E | Nonthaburi | Yamaha Stadium | 15,000 | 2010–2011 |
| 13°55′05″N 100°32′51″E | Lak Si, Bangkok | TOT Stadium Chaeng Watthana | 5,000 | 2011–2015 |

== Season by season domestic record ==
| Season | League | | | | | | | | | FA Cup | League Cup | Kor Royal Cup | AFC Champions League | Top scorer | |
| Season | Division | P | W | D | L | F | A | Pts | Pos | FA Cup | League Cup | Kor Royal Cup | AFC Champions League | Name | Goals |
|---|---|---|---|---|---|---|---|---|---|---|---|---|---|---|---|
| 1996–97 | TPL | 34 | 17 | 11 | 6 | 61 | 35 | 62 | 2nd | —N/a | – | – | – | Amporn Amparnsuwan | 21 |
| 1997 | TPL | 22 | 8 | 5 | 9 | 32 | 33 | 29 | 8th | —N/a | – | – | – | —N/a | —N/a |
| 1998 | TPL | 22 | 8 | 6 | 8 | 36 | 37 | 30 | 6th | —N/a | – | – | – | —N/a | —N/a |
| 1999 | TPL | 22 | 11 | 5 | 6 | 26 | 20 | 38 | 5th | —N/a | – | – | – | —N/a | —N/a |
| 2000 | TPL | 22 | 6 | 2 | 14 | 26 | 42 | 20 | 12th | —N/a | – | – | – | —N/a | —N/a |
| 2001–02 | TPL | 22 | 6 | 6 | 10 | 18 | 24 | 24 | 9th | —N/a | – | – | – | —N/a | —N/a |
| 2002–03 | TPL | 18 | 2 | 5 | 11 | 18 | 29 | 11 | 9th | – | – | – | – | —N/a | —N/a |
| 2003/04 | DIV 1 | – | – | – | – | – | – | – | 1st | – | – | – | – | —N/a | —N/a |
| 2004–05 | TPL | 18 | 3 | 7 | 8 | 20 | 25 | 16 | 9th | – | – | – | – | —N/a | —N/a |
| 2006 | PRO | 30 | 19 | 10 | 1 | 72 | 22 | 67 | 1st | – | – | – | – | —N/a | —N/a |
| 2007 | TPL | 30 | 9 | 10 | 11 | 35 | 35 | 37 | 10th | – | – | – | – | Phuwadol Suwannachart | 10 |
| 2008 | TPL | 30 | 13 | 11 | 6 | 36 | 27 | 50 | 5th | – | – | – | – | Phuwadol Suwannachart | 8 |
| 2009 | TPL | 30 | 10 | 12 | 8 | 33 | 33 | 42 | 7th | R3 | – | – | – | Suchao Nutnum | 6 |
| 2010 | TPL | 30 | 9 | 6 | 15 | 23 | 42 | 33 | 12th | R3 | R3 | – | – | Miroslav Tóth | 7 |
| 2011 | TPL | 34 | 11 | 4 | 19 | 29 | 55 | 37 | 14th | R5 | R2 | – | – | Koné Mohamed | 10 |
| 2012 | TPL | 34 | 10 | 12 | 12 | 43 | 46 | 42 | 12th | R3 | SF | – | – | Prakit Deeporm | 6 |
| 2013 | TPL | 32 | 8 | 7 | 17 | 27 | 54 | 31 | 14th | R3 | R2 | – | – | Prakit Deeporm | 5 |
| 2014 | TPL | 38 | 10 | 13 | 15 | 38 | 51 | 43 | 15th | QR | R1 | – | – | Takahiro Kawamura | 9 |
| 2015 | TPL | 34 | 3 | 7 | 24 | 25 | 71 | 16 | 18th | R3 | R1 | – | – | Kritnaphop Mekpatcharakul | 3 |

| Champions | Runners-up | Third place | Promoted | Relegated |

- P = Played
- W = Games won
- D = Games drawn
- L = Games lost
- F = Goals for
- A = Goals against
- Pts = Points
- Pos = Final position
- N/A = No answer

- TPL = Thai Premier League

- QR1 = First Qualifying Round
- QR2 = Second Qualifying Round
- QR3 = Third Qualifying Round
- QR4 = Fourth Qualifying Round
- RInt = Intermediate Round
- R1 = Round 1
- R2 = Round 2
- R3 = Round 3

- R4 = Round 4
- R5 = Round 5
- R6 = Round 6
- GR = Group stage
- QF = Quarter-finals
- SF = Semi-finals
- RU = Runners-up
- S = Shared
- W = Winners

== Coaches ==
Coaches by Years (1988–2015)

| Name | Nat | Period | Honours |
|---|---|---|---|
| Pongphan Wongsuwan | (Thailand) | 1988–1997 | |
| Pongphan Wongsuwan | (Thailand) | 1998–2009 | Thailand Division 1 League: 2003; Provincial League: 2006 |
| Somchai Subpherm | (Thailand) | 2010 | |
| Narong Suwannachot | (Thailand) | 2010–2011 | |
| Somchai Subpherm | (Thailand) | 2011–2015 | |
| Apisit Kaikaew | (Thailand) | 2015 | |
| Tewesh Kamolsin | (Thailand) | 2015 | |

== Honours ==
- Thailand Division 1 League
  - Winners (1): 2003
- Thailand FA Cup
  - Winners (1): 1993
- Provincial League
  - Winners (1): 2006
