= Thailand Tobacco Monopoly F.C. =

Thai football club

TTM FC ทีทีเอ็ม เอฟซี
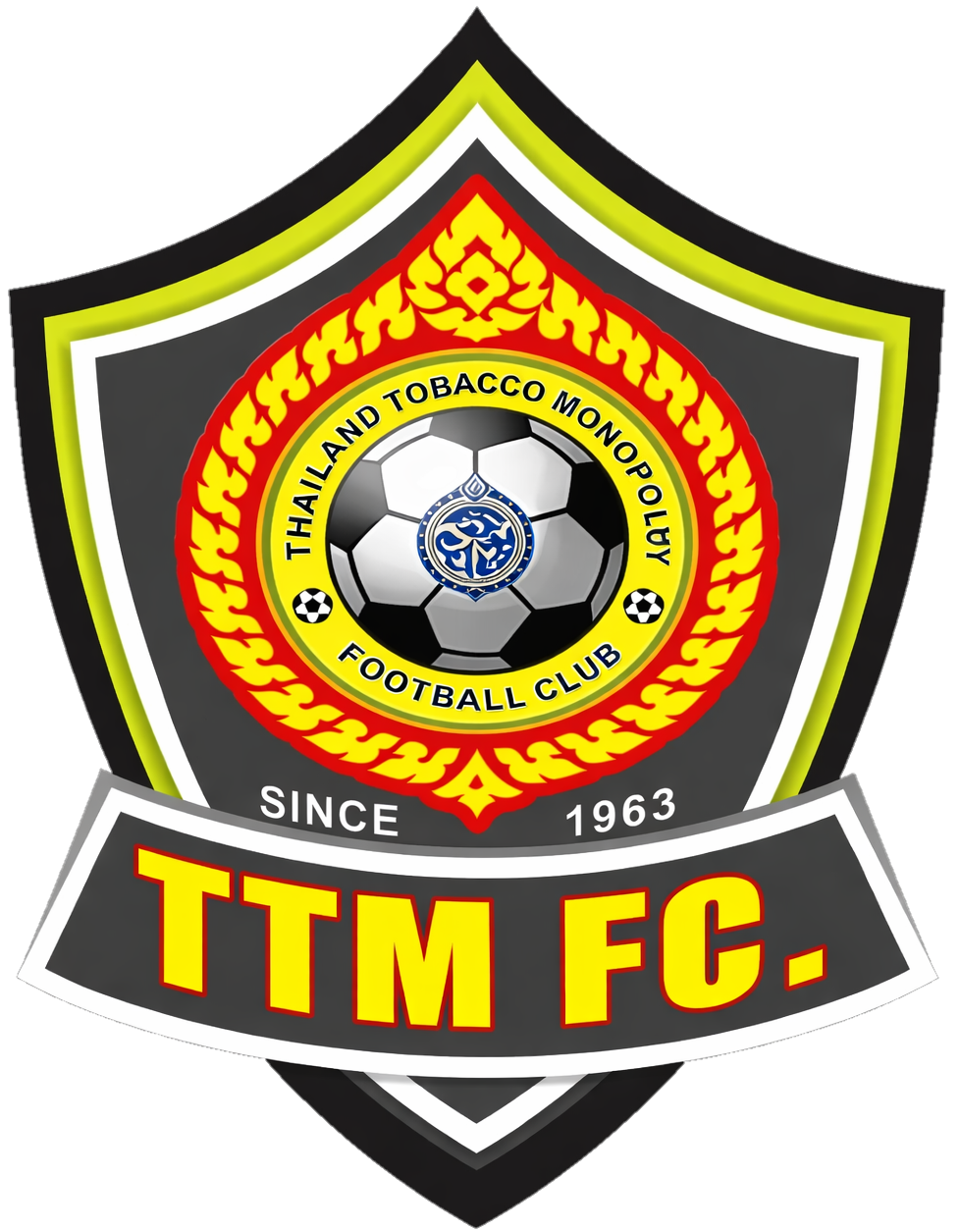
- Full name: Thailand Tobacco Monopoly Football Club สโมสรฟุตบอลโรงงานยาสูบ
- Nicknames: Cigarette-smoker (สิงห์อมควัน)
- Founded: 1963
- Dissolved: 2015
- Ground: Lad Krabang 54 Stadium; Samut Prakan, Thailand
- Capacity: 2,000
- Owner: Thailand Tobacco Monopoly
Home colours	Away colours

Thailand Tobacco Monopoly Football Club (Thai: สโมสรฟุตบอลโรงงานยาสูบ), commonly known as the TTM FC., was a Thai defunct football club originally based in Bangkok. The club, founded in 1963, was one of the oldest clubs in Thailand. Their biggest achievement was winning the Thai Premier League title in 2005.

The club was subject to a number of renamings and moves from 2009: first to TTM-Samut Sakhon F.C, then to TTM F.C.-Phichit for the 2010 season, whereupon the team re-located to the Northern province. In 2012 the club once again relocated to Chiang Mai and would be known as TTM-Chiangmai F.C. In 2013 they moved to Lopburi, then in 2014 they returned to their original home of Bangkok. In 2015 they finished 19th and were relegated to the Regional League. The club was dissolved in 2015.

The club has won 1 Thai League 1 title, 1 Thai League 2 title and 1 Kor Royal Cups.

== History ==
Thailand Tobacco Monopoly football club were formed in 1963 as the works teams of the company of the same name. They have been ever presents in the structure of Thai football since the game became professional in the 1996–97 season.

=== The early years ===
TTM as the team were more commonly known began life in the professional era in the 1996–97 Thailand Soccer League with 17 other teams. As this was the first season to use a traditional league format, it was determined that the bottom six teams would be relegated to form a new feeder league. TTM were one of the bottom 6 teams that would be relegated. They would not come back to the Thai Premier League until the 2001–02 Thai League season when they won their first silverware, the Thai Division 1 League.

On their return to the TPL, they comfortably found themselves as a mid table outfit, finishing in 8th position in their first three seasons. Although comfortably above the relegation zone, they were somewhat rather behind the leading pack.

=== Champions of Thailand ===
In the 2004–05 Thai League TTM were to win their first and only league title. They won 9, drew 7 and lost 2 matches over the season.

=== ASEAN Club Championship Disaster ===
In July 2005, the team went quietly confident into the ASEAN Club Championship, a competition for league winners of the ASEAN region. TTM were drawn into Group B with the host club DPMM of Brunei, Tampines Rovers of Singapore and the Finance and Revenue team of Myanmar.

In the first group game, TTM let a 2-goal lead slip to the hosts DPMM played at the Sultan Hassal Bolkiah Stadium. In the second group game they had to beat Tampines Rovers but they were strongly overcome by Tampines foreign contingent and lost 3:1. Therefore, they went into the last group game hoping that other results would go their way and that they in turn could also turn over a big goal difference. This was not to be the case as they once again lost and went out of the competition.

=== ACL Disqualification ===
TTM were expected to take part in the 2006 AFC Champions League but failed to register any paper work on time and were therefore disqualified. TTM were drawn in Group F with Koreans Ulsan Hyundai Horang-i, Tokyo Verdy of Japan and Arema of Indonesia.

=== New identity and relocations ===
In 2009 and with the shake up of Thai football in general, all company based teams had to become sports entities, thus forcing out the like of Bangkok Bank and Krung Thai Bank. TTM decided to re-locate from Bangkok and move to Samut Sakhon Province and renamed themselves TTM F.C. Samut Sakhon. They had in fact moved in the second half of the 2008 season but kept the same name TTM until 2009. Games would be played at the Samut Sakhon Stadium.

This name change and new identity would only last one season however, as again, in time for the 2010 season, they once again relocated to the province of Phichit Province and renamed TTM F.C. Phichit. This did not go down to well with some supporters of Thai football as they had moved from a province that previously didn't have a football club and moved to a province that already had a team, Phichit, who had worked hard to gather a supporter base. The plus side of TTM moving to Phichit is that from their previous home a new club was formed, Samut Sakhon.

After two season of mid-table anonymity in Phichit, the club took the gamble and tried their luck in the northern city of Chiang Mai. This move was to prove to be disastrous as TTM finished in bottom place and were relegated from the TPL in 2012. The club were shunned by the locals who preferred to stick by their regional league side Chiang Mai FC. In 2013 they moved to Lopburi, then in 2014 they returned to their original home of Bangkok, ground sharing with Customs United F.C.

=== Dissolution ===
In 2015 they finished 19th in the second tier and were relegated to the Regional League and decided to dissolved the club.

== Stadium and locations by season records ==
Coordinates	Location	Stadium	Capacity	Year
13°57′04″N 100°37′28″E	Pathum Thani	Thupatemi Stadium	25,000	2007
13°32′30″N 100°16′50″E	Samut Sakhon	Institute of Physical Education Samut Sakhon Stadium	6,378	2008–2010
16°26′35″N 100°19′26″E	Phichit	Phichit Provincial Stadium	5,000	2010–2011
18°50′23″N 98°57′34″E	Chiang Mai	700th Anniversary Stadium	25,000	2012
13°52′02″N 100°34′39″E	Lak Si, Bangkok	Boonyachinda Stadium	3,500	2013
13°42′22″N 100°47′02″E	Samut Prakan	Lad Krabang 54 Stadium	2,000	2014–2015

== Season By Season record ==
Season	League									FA Cup	Queen's Cup	League Cup	Asia	Top scorer	
Season	Division	P	W	D	L	F	A	Pts	Pos	FA Cup	Queen's Cup	League Cup	Asia	Name	Goals
1996–97	TPL	34	7	14	13	37	44	35	13th						
1997	DIV1														
1998	DIV1														
1999	DIV1														
2000	DIV1								1st						
2001–02	TPL	22	8	2	12	24	35	26	8th						
2002–03	TPL	18	5	6	7	22	25	21	8th						
2003–04	TPL	18	4	7	7	16	18	19	8th						
2004–05	TPL	18	9	7	2	26	11	34	1st				ASEAN Club Championship – GS		
2006	TPL	22	9	8	5	30	24	35	4th				AFC Champions League – DIS	(Thailand) Kwanchai Fuangprakob	9
2007	TPL	30	12	8	10	43	42	44	6th					(Brazil) Ney Fabiano	18
2008	TPL	30	7	12	11	20	25	33	12th				Singapore Cup – QF	(Thailand) Worawut Wangsawad	5
2009	TPL	30	8	13	9	29	32	37	8th	SF	R1		Singapore Cup; Third place	(Cameroon) Paul Ekollo	7
2010	TPL	30	7	11	12	32	46	32	13th	R4	Not Enter	R2		(Brazil) Valci Júnior	10
2011	TPL	34	12	7	15	38	54	43	11th	R3		R2		(South Korea) Kim Joo-Yong	11
2012	TPL	34	2	12	20	25	57	18	18th	R3		R3		(Brazil) Leonardo	10
2013	DIV1	34	9	11	14	36	46	38	14th	R3		R1		(France) Lassana Sidibe	7
2014	DIV1	34	10	15	9	41	42	45	12th	R3		R2		(Cameroon) Camara Souleymane	6
2015	DIV1	38	10	10	18	34	51	40	19th	R3		R1		(Thailand) Chakrit Rawanprakone	11

Champions	Runners-up	Third place	Promoted	Relegated

- P = Played
- W = Games won
- D = Games drawn
- L = Games lost
- F = Goals for
- A = Goals against
- Pts = Points
- Pos = Final position
- TPL = Thai Premier League
- QR1 = First Qualifying Round
- QR2 = Second Qualifying Round
- QR3 = Third Qualifying Round
- QR4 = Fourth Qualifying Round
- RInt = Intermediate Round
- R1 = Round 1
- R2 = Round 2
- R3 = Round 3
- R4 = Round 4
- R5 = Round 5
- R6 = Round 6
- GR = Group stage
- QF = Quarter-finals
- SF = Semi-finals
- RU = Runners-up
- S = Shared
- W = Winners
- DIS = Disqualified

== Continental record ==
Season	Competition	Round	Club	Home	Away	Aggregate
2005	ASEAN Club Championship	Group B	(Brunei) DPMM FC	2–2		4th
2005	ASEAN Club Championship	Group B	(Singapore) Tampines Rovers	1–3		4th
2005	ASEAN Club Championship	Group B	(Myanmar) Finance and Revenue	2–1		4th

== Invitational tournament record ==
Season	Competition	Round	Club	Home	Away	Aggregate
2008	Singapore Cup	Preliminary Round	(Singapore) Gombak United	0–1		
2008	Singapore Cup	Quarter-final	(Singapore) Woodlands Wellington	1–1	0–0	1–1 (p) 2-4
2009	Singapore Cup	Preliminary Round	(South Korea) Super Reds	4–2		
2009	Singapore Cup	Quarter-final	(Singapore) Woodlands Wellington	4–2	1–3	7–3
2009	Singapore Cup	Semi-final	(Thailand) Bangkok Glass	0–6	3–4	4–9

== Coaches ==
Coaches by Years (2000–present)

Name	Nat	Period	Honours
Anant Amornkiat	(Thailand)	2000–04	Thailand Division 1 League 2000
Jose Alves Borges	(Brazil)	2004–05, 2006	Thai Premier League 2004/05
Jose Carlos da Silva	(Brazil)	2007	
Loius Mayer	(Brazil)	2007	
Kawin Kachendecha	(Thailand)	2008	
Prajuk Viengsong	(Thailand)	July 2008 – Nov 2008	
Attaphol Buspakom	(Thailand)	Jan 2009 – April 2009	
Kij Meesrisuk	(Thailand)	May 2009 – Aug 2009	
Prajuk Viengsong	(Thailand)	Aug 2009	
Jose Alves Borges	(Brazil)	2010	
Bae Myung-Ho	(South Korea)	Jan 2011 – April 2011	
Lee Young-Moo	(South Korea)	May 2011 – Jan 2012	
Somchai Chuayboonchum	(Thailand)	Jan 2012 – April 2012	
Narong Suwannachot	(Thailand)	April 2012 – 2013	
Jatuporn Pramualban	(Thailand)	2013–2014	
Narasak Boonkleng	(Thailand)	2015	

== Achievements ==
- Thai League 1:

Champion: 2005

- Thailand League 2:

Winner: 2000

- Kor Royal Cup:

Winner: 2006
