= Sisaket F.C. =

Thai football club

Sisaket ศรีสะเกษ เอฟซี
- Full name: Sisaket Football Club สโมสรฟุตบอลศรีสะเกษ
- Nicknames: The Dangerous Koupreys (กูปรีอันตราย)
- Short name: SSKFC
- Founded: 1999
- Dissolved: 2022 (became Esan United)
- Ground: Sri Nakhon Lamduan Stadium; Sisaket, Thailand
- Capacity: 11,200
Home colours	Away colours	Third colours

Sisaket Football Club (Thai: สโมสรฟุตบอลจังหวัดศรีสะเกษ) is a Thai defunct professional football club. The club used to play in the Thai League 1 between season 2010 to 2017. The highlight is being a local team that has a large number of football fans in the Isan area.

== History ==
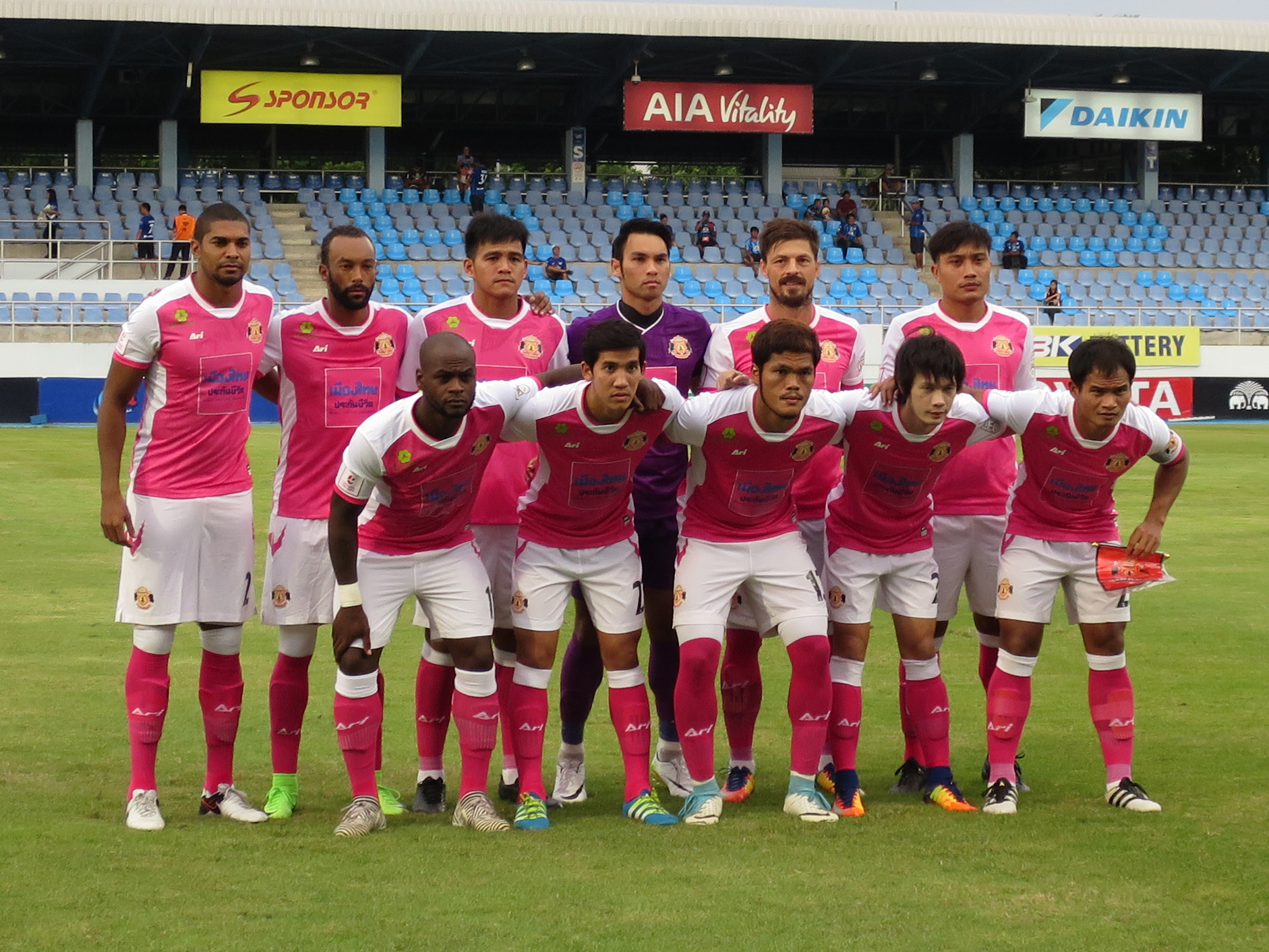
Sisaket FC in 2017

The club was founded as Sisaket Football Club in 2009 and won the Thai Provincial League. The team was founded by the Sports Authority of Thailand in collaboration with the Football Association of Thailand.

In 2008, they were promoted from the Regional League Division 2 to take them back to the Thai First Division.

Sisaket were promoted to the Premier League in 2010 after finishing third in the 2009 Thai Division 1 League.

In 2012, the club relocated to Ubon Ratchathani Province after the local Sisaket government decided to back the newly formed Sisaket United. The club also changed their name to Esan United. Esan United finished the season in 6th, a record for the club.

In 2013 the Football Association of Thailand found Esan United guilty of forging documents, causing the club return to Sisaket. Due to legal conflicts, Sisaket were suspended for the rest of the season but were not relegated.

The club returned to the Thai Premier League in 2014, returning to their old name of Sisaket and used Sri Nakhon Lamduan Stadium as their home ground.

On 27 July 2022, the Administrative Court of Thailand issued a verdict instructing the Football Association of Thailand to return the rights to manage a football team of the Sisaket to Esan United and compensate Esan United in the amount of 18.5 million baht. Therefore, it can be regarded as the dissolution of the Sisaket team as a default.

== Stadium and locations by season records ==
Coordinates	Location	Stadium	Capacity	Year
15°06′02″N 104°20′27″E	Sisaket	Sri Nakhon Lamduan Stadium	10,000	2007–2011
15°18′17″N 104°47′02″E	Ubon Ratchathani	Tung Burapha Stadium	7,500	2012
15°06′02″N 104°20′27″E	Sisaket	Sri Nakhon Lamduan Stadium	11,200	2013–2022

== Seasons ==
Season	League									FA Cup	Thai League Cup	Queen's Cup	Kor Royal Cup	AFC Champions League	Top scorer	
Season	Division	P	W	D	L	F	A	Pts	Pos	FA Cup	Thai League Cup	Queen's Cup	Kor Royal Cup	AFC Champions League	Name	Goals
2007	DIV 1	22	7	6	9	36	38	27	10th	–	–	–	–	–	—N/a	—N/a
2008	DIV 2	20	10	7	3	41	21	37	2nd	–	–	–	–	–	—N/a	—N/a
2009	DIV 1	30	15	13	2	53	26	58	3rd	R3	–	–	–	–	Piroj Anantanarong	16
2010	TPL	30	6	8	16	36	54	26	14th	QF	QF	–	–	–	Piyawat Thongman	8
2011	TPL	34	9	12	13	33	39	39	12th	R5	R3	–	–	–	Wuttichai Tathong; Victor Amaro	5
2012	TPL	34	11	14	9	41	42	47	6th	R4	R1	–	–	–	Tana Chanabut	15^{(9 goals to Esan United) +(6 goals to Police United)}
2013	TPL	Suspended														
2014	TPL	38	12	10	16	48	59	46	12th	R3	–	–	–	–	Sarayuth Chaikamdee	9
2015	TPL	34	9	9	16	30	47	36	13th	R4	RU	–	–	–	Adefolarin Durosinmi	13
2016	TL	31	8	9	14	41	52	33	13th	R3	QF	–	–	–	Anton Zemlianukhin	8
2017	T1	34	6	5	23	43	90	23	17th	R2	R1	–	–	–	Mariano Berriex	7
2018	T2	28	8	10	10	29	32	34	10th	SF	R1	–	–	–	Cristiano	8
2019	T2	34	20	11	3	54	21	59	4th	R2	R1	–	–	–	Willen Mota	18
2020–21	T2	34	9	9	16	34	44	36	16th	QR	–	–	–	–	Evgeni Kabaev	8
2021–22	T3 Northeast	24	17	2	5	52	28	53	2nd	–	QR2	–	–	–	Seksit Srisai	13

Champions	Runners-up	Third place	Promoted	Relegated

- P = Played
- W = Games won
- D = Games drawn
- L = Games lost
- F = Goals for
- A = Goals against
- Pts = Points
- Pos = Final position
- N/A = No answer
- TPL = Thai Premier League
- TL = Thai League 1
- QR1 = First Qualifying Round
- QR2 = Second Qualifying Round
- QR3 = Third Qualifying Round
- QR4 = Fourth Qualifying Round
- RInt = Intermediate Round
- R1 = Round 1
- R2 = Round 2
- R3 = Round 3
- R4 = Round 4
- R5 = Round 5
- R6 = Round 6
- GR = Group stage
- QF = Quarter-finals
- SF = Semi-finals
- RU = Runners-up
- S = Shared
- W = Winners

== Former coaches ==
- (Thailand) Chartkla Subsongpol 2006 –2009
- (Thailand) Somchart Yimsiri 2009 –2010
- (Brazil) Freddy Marinho 2010
- (South Korea) Kim Kyung-Ju 2010
- (Thailand) Wisoot Wichaya 2010
- (England) Dave Booth 2010 –2011
- (Brazil) Reuther Moreira 2011 –2012
- (Thailand) Narong Suwannachot 2013
- (Thailand) Paniphon Kerdyam 2013 –2014
- (Thailand) Chalermwoot Sa-ngapol 2014 –2016
- (Serbia) Božidar Bandović 2016
- (Japan) Masahiro Wada 2016
- (Thailand) Dusit Chalermsan 2016 –2017
- (Bulgaria) Velizar Popov 2017
- (Thailand) Chalermwoot Sa-ngapol 2017
- (Brazil) Robert Jose da Silva 2017 –2018
- (Thailand) Somchai Chuayboonchum 2018 –2019
- (Thailand) Worachai Surinsirirat 2020
- (Thailand) Chusak Sriphum 2020
- (Thailand) Sarayuth Chaikamdee 2020
- (Thailand) Worrawoot Srimaka 2021
- (Thailand) Santi Chaiyaphuak 2021 –2022

== Honours ==
=== Domestic competitions ===
- Provincial League
  - Winners (1): 1999–2000
- Thai Division 2 League
  - Runners-up (1): 2008
- League Cup
  - Runners-up (1): 2015
