= 2017 Bangkok Glass F.C. season =

Bangkok Glass
2017 season
- Chairman: Pavin Bhirombhakdi
- Manager: Aurelio Vidmar
- Stadium: Leo Stadium, Thanyaburi, Pathum Thani, Thailand
- Thai League: 5th
- Thai FA Cup: Round of 16
- Thai League Cup: Round of 32
- Top goalscorer: League: Jhasmani Campos (10); Surachat Sareepim (10); All: Jhasmani Campos (14)
Home colours	Away colours

The 2017 season is Bangkok Glass's 7th season in the Thai League since 2011, on the name of Bangkok Glass.

== Thai League ==
Date	Opponents	H / A	Result F–A	Scorers	League position
11 February 2017	SCG Muangthong United	H	0–4		17th
18 February 2017	Super Power Samut Prakan	A	0–0		14th
24 February 2017	Sisaket	H	6–0	Campos 30', Daniel (2) 45+1', 88', Ariel (2) 67', 70', Peerapong 72'	7th
5 March 2017	Ratchaburi Mitr Phol	H	3–2	Jakkapan 16', Ariel 30', Carlos 50' (o.g.)	6th
8 March 2017	Suphanburi	A	1–1	Chatree 67'	6th
11 March 2017	Bangkok United	H	3–2	Campos 30', Daniel 62', Chatree 81'	5th
3 April 2017	Navy	A	3–2	Nattachai 28', Daniel 65', Ariel 69'	4th
9 April 2017	Thai Honda Ladkrabang	H	0–1		5th
19 April 2017	Port	A	3–0	Daniel (2) 37', 90+4', Surachat 76'	4th
22 April 2017	Ubon UMT United	H	1–0	Ariel 32'	4th
30 April 2017	Chiangrai United	A	0–3		4th
3 May 2017	Buriram United	H	2–1	Supachai 63', Campos 88'	4th
7 May 2017	Sukhothai	H	2–2	Campos 3', Jakkapan 71'	4th
14 May 2017	BEC Tero Sasana	A	2–1	Chatree 41', Campos 84'	4th
17 May 2017	Chonburi	H	3–0	Campos 11', Chatree 45+2', Sarawut 73'	4th
20 May 2017	Pattaya United	A	2–4	Chatree 42', Daniel 90+2'	4th
28 May 2017	Nakhon Ratchasima Mazda	H	1–0	Chatree 81'	4th
17 June 2017	Super Power Samut Prakan	H	8–0	Chatree (3) 21', 67', 74', Campos (2) 25', 41', Chaowat 31', Nattachai 54', Peerapong 88'	3rd
24 June 2017	Sisaket	A	0–0		4th
28 June 2017	Ratchaburi Mitr Phol	A	0–1		5th
1 July 2017	Suphanburi	H	2–1	Campos 45', Surachat 90+1'	5th
5 July 2017	Bangkok United	A	4–5	Surachat (3) 43', 53', 59', Chitpanya 82'	5th
8 July 2017	Navy	H	3–0	Chaowat 18', Peerapong 64', Apisit 85'	5th
29 July 2017	Thai Honda Ladkrabang	A	2–0	Surachat 34', Daniel 87' (pen.)	5th
5 August 2017	Port	H	0–0		5th
10 September 2017	Ubon UMT United	A	1–1	Chitpanya 42'	5th
17 September 2017	Chiangrai United	H	2–1	Apisit 64', Surachat 90+5'	4th
20 September 2017	Buriram United	A	0–1		5th
23 September 2017	Sukhothai	A	1–1	Campos 63'	5th
14 October 2017	BEC Tero Sasana	H	4–0	N'dri 40' (o.g.), Surachat (2) 53', 59', Sakeereen 90+3'	5th
22 October 2017	Chonburi	A	1–1	Surachat 84'	5th
8 November 2017	Pattaya United	H	2–5	Ariel 37', Daniel 88'	5th
12 November 2017	Nakhon Ratchasima Mazda	A	1–2	Chitpanya 74'	5th
18 November 2017	SCG Muangthong United	A	0–2		5th

Pos	Team	Pld	W	D	L	GF	GA	GD	Pts	Qualification or relegation
3	Bangkok United	34	21	3	10	97	57	+40	66	
4	Chiangrai United (Q)	34	18	6	10	67	42	+25	60	Qualification to 2018 AFC Champions League Preliminary round 2 (Note: Chiangrai United qualified for the 2018 AFC Champions League Preliminary round 2 as winners of the 2017 Thai FA Cup.)
5	Bangkok Glass	34	16	8	10	63	44	+19	56	
6	Ratchaburi Mitr Phol	34	16	7	11	63	49	+14	55	
7	Chonburi	34	15	8	11	59	59	0	53	

Updated to match(es) played on 18 November 2017. Source: Thai League
Rules for classification: 1) Points; 2) Head-to-head points; 3) Head-to-head goals difference; 4) Head-to-head goals scored; 5) Overall goals difference; 6) Overall goals scored; 7) Fair play points; 8) Play-off without extra time;).
(Q) Qualified for the phase indicated

== Thai FA Cup ==
Date	Opponents	H / A	Result F–A	Scorers	Round
21 June 2017	Pibulsongkram Rajabhat University	H	6–0	Apisit 30', Chalermsak 42', Ariel 59', Sakeereen 83', Surachat 87', Nattapon 90'	Round of 64
2 August 2017	Navy	H	6–1	Piyachanok 10', Surachat 23', Ikeda 32', Campos (3) 52', 63', 67'	Round of 32
27 September 2017	Buriram United	H	0–2		Round of 16

== Thai League Cup ==
Date	Opponents	H / A	Result F–A	Scorers	Round
26 July 2017	SCG Muangthong United	A	2–5	Surachat 33', Campos 45+2'	Round of 32

== Reserve team in Thai League 4 ==
Bangkok Glass send the reserve team to compete in T4 Bangkok Metropolitan Region as Bangkok Glass B.

Date	Opponents	H / A	Result F–A	Scorers	League position
12 February 2017	PTU Pathum Thani	H	2–1	Srithai (2) 38', 72'	1st
20 February 2017	Rangsit University	A	0–1		5th
6 March 2017	BCC	A	2–1	Rangsiman 23', Thammayut 79' (pen.)	4th
13 March 2017	North Bangkok University	A	0–0		4th
18 March 2017	Grakcu Looktabfah Pathum Thani	H	3–2	Chitpanya 11', Verapat (2) 85', 87'	3rd
25 March 2017	Samut Prakan	H	1–2	Rangsiman 79'	5th
1 April 2017	Samut Prakan United	A	3–2	Verapat (2) 34', 82', Rangsiman 90+3'	2nd
8 April 2017	Kopoon Warrior	A	0–0		4th
30 April 2017	Bangkok United B	H	3–3	Nantawat 40', Thammayut (2) 72', 90+3' (pen.)	4th
8 May 2017	Dome	H	1–1	Nantawat 22'	4th
15 May 2017	PTU Pathum Thani	A	0–1		4th
21 May 2017	Rangsit University	H	1–0	Nantawat 60'	4th
28 May 2017	Bangkok United B	A	5–4	Verapat (3) 34', 45+2', 70', Chitpanya 35', Apisit61'	4th
4 June 2017	BCC	H	1–1	Mongkol 58'	4th
18 June 2017	North Bangkok University	H	1–1	Nantawat 60'	3rd
25 June 2017	Grakcu Looktabfah Pathum Thani	A	2–4	Verapat (2) 7', 45+2'	4th
2 July 2017	Samut Prakan	A	0–1		5th
9 July 2017	Samut Prakan United	H	2–2	Verapat (2) 55', 59'	4th
12 July 2017	Kopoon Warrior	H	0–0		5th
19 July 2017	Dome	A	1–1	Rangsiman 74'	6th
23 July 2017	PTU Pathum Thani	A	2–3	Rangsiman 3', Aitthiphon 90+2'	7th
30 July 2017	Rangsit University	A	0–0		6th
6 August 2017	BCC	H	0–2		7th
9 August 2017	Bangkok United B	H	0–2		7th
12 August 2017	North Bangkok University	A	0–1		8th
16 August 2017	Grakcu Looktabfah Pathum Thani	A	1–2	Phattaraphon 45'	8th
20 August 2017	Samut Prakan	A	0–5		9th
27 August 2017	Samut Prakan United	H	1–0	Panut 75'	9th
30 August 2017	Kopoon Warrior	H	1–1	Verapat 81'	9th
9 September 2017	Dome	A	1–0	Nantawat 2'	9th

Pos	Team	Pld	W	D	L	GF	GA	GD	Pts	Qualification or relegation
7	PTU Pathum Thani	30	9	11	10	35	35	0	38	
8	Rangsit University	30	8	11	11	29	36	−7	35 (Note: All head-to-head records was equivalent. Rangsit University ahead on overall goals difference; Rangsit University -7, Bangkok Glass B -10.)	
9	Bangkok Glass B (Note: Bangkok Glass B have finished lower than 8th place. So, they could not compete in T4 for one season by the rules of FA Thailand.)	30	8	11	11	34	44	−10	35	Could not compete in 2018 Thai League 4
10	Grakcu Looktabfah Pathum Thani	30	9	7	14	39	52	−13	34	
11	Samut Prakan United (R)	30	5	2	23	27	69	−42	17	Relegation to the 2018 Thailand Amateur League

Updated to match(es) played on 20 October 2017. Source: Thai League 4
Rules for classification: 1) Points; 2) Head-to-head points; 3) Head-to-head goals difference; 4) Head-to-head goals scored; 5) Overall goals difference; 6) Overall goals scored; 7) Fair play points; 8) Play-off without extra time;).
(R) Relegated

== Squad goals statistics ==
No.	Pos.	Name	League	FA Cup	League Cup	Total
1	GK	(Thailand) Narit Taweekul	0	0	0	0
3	DF	(Japan) Jurato Ikeda	0	0	0	0
4	DF	(Australia) Matt Smith	0	0	0	0
5	DF	(Thailand) Pravinwat Boonyong	0	0	0	0
7	FW	(Costa Rica) Ariel Rodríguez	0	0	0	0
8	MF	(Spain) Daniel García	0	0	0	0
9	FW	(Thailand) Surachat Sareepim	0	0	0	0
10	MF	(Thailand) Jakkapan Pornsai	0	0	0	0
11	MF	(Thailand) Atthawit Sukchuai	0	0	0	0
14	MF	(Thailand) Sarawut Masuk	0	0	0	0
16	FW	(Thailand) Nantawat Suankaew	0	0	0	0
17	DF	(Thailand) Supachai Komsilp	0	0	0	0
18	DF	(Thailand) Mongkol Namnuad	0	0	0	0
19	DF	(Thailand) Pichit Ketsro	0	0	0	0
21	MF	(Bolivia) Jhasmani Campos	0	0	0	0
22	FW	(Thailand) Nattachai Srisuwan	0	0	0	0
23	MF	(Thailand) Peerapong Pichitchotirat (vc)	0	0	0	0
24	MF	(Thailand) Siwakorn Sangwong	0	0	0	0
27	GK	(Thailand) Wanlop Sae-Jiu	0	0	0	0
28	DF	(Thailand) Apisit Sorada	0	0	0	0
29	FW	(Thailand) Chatree Chimtalay (c)	0	0	0	0
32	FW	(Thailand) Warut Boonsuk	0	0	0	0
34	DF	(Thailand) Piyachanok Darit	0	0	0	0
35	MF	(Thailand) Tassanapong Muaddarak	0	0	0	0
38	GK	(Thailand) Korraphat Nareechan	0	0	0	0
39	MF	(Thailand) Chaowat Veerachat	0	0	0	0
93	GK	(Thailand) Pisan Dorkmaikaew	0	0	0	0

== Transfers ==
First Thai footballer's market is opening on 14 December 2016 to 28 January 2017
Second Thai footballer's market is opening on 3 June 2017 to 30 June 2017

=== In ===
Date	Pos.	Name	From
4 October 2016	MF	(Thailand) Atthawit Sukchuai	(Thailand) Ratchaburi Mitr Phol
22 October 2016	MF	(Thailand) Chaowat Veerachat	(Thailand) Buriram United
27 October 2016	FW	(Thailand) Nattachai Srisuwan	(Thailand) Samut Songkhram
1 December 2016	GK	(Thailand) Pisan Dorkmaikaew	(Thailand) Bangkok United
8 December 2016	DF	(Thailand) Apisit Sorada	(Thailand) Air Force Central
21 December 2016	MF	(Bolivia) Jhasmani Campos	(Bolivia) Sport Boys
6 January 2017	DF	(Thailand) Mongkol Namnuad	(Thailand) Khonkaen United
12 June 2017	DF	(Thailand) Chalermsak Aukkee	(Thailand) Ubon UMT United

=== Out ===
Date	Pos.	Name	To
25 November 2016	FW	(France) Romain Gasmi	(Thailand) BBCU
28 December 2016	GK	(Thailand) Sarawut Konglarp	(Thailand) Chiangrai United
5 January 2017	DF	(Thailand) Apiwich Phulek	(Thailand) Chiangmai
6 January 2017	DF	(Thailand) Jetsadakorn Hemdaeng	(Thailand) PTT Rayong
6 January 2017	MF	(Thailand) Ongart Pamonprasert	(Thailand) Army United
6 January 2017	MF	(Thailand) Pakin Kaikaew	(Thailand) Thai Honda Ladkrabang
16 January 2017	MF	(Mali) Kalifa Cissé	(Thailand) BEC Tero Sasana
16 January 2017	DF	(Thailand) Mehtanon Sudsean	Released
16 January 2017	GK	(Thailand) Jaturong Samakorn	Released
16 January 2017	DF	(Thailand) Torsak Sa-ardeiem	(Thailand) Chiangmai
9 June 2017	MF	(Thailand) Jakkapan Pornsai	(Thailand) Bangkok United

=== Loan in ===
Date from	Date to	Pos.	Name	From
10 January 2017	31 December 2017	DF	(Japan) Jurato Ikeda	(Japan) Cerezo Osaka

=== Loan out ===
Date from	Date to	Pos.	Name	To
21 January 2017	31 December 2017	DF	(Thailand) Suwannapat Kingkkaew	(Thailand) Chiangmai
