= 2016 Bangkok Glass F.C. season =

Bangkok Glass
2016 season
- Chairman: Pavin Bhirombhakdi
- Manager: Surachai Jaturapattanapong (Until 1 August 2016); Aurelio Vidmar (Since 1 August 2016)
- Stadium: Leo Stadium, Thanyaburi, Pathum Thani, Thailand
- Thai League: 3rd
- Thai FA Cup: Round of 32
- Thai League Cup: Round of 32
- Top goalscorer: League: Ariel Rodríguez (19); All: Ariel Rodríguez (21)
Home colours	Away colours

The 2016 season is Bangkok Glass's 6th season in the Thai Premier League, on the name of Bangkok Glass.

== Foreign players ==
Note: Flags indicate national team as defined under FIFA eligibility rules; some limited exceptions apply. Players may hold more than one non-FIFA nationality.

No.	Pos.	Nation	Player
4	DF	AUS	Matt Smith
7	FW	CRC	Ariel Rodríguez
8	MF	ESP	Daniel García
11	FW	NAM	Lazarus Kaimbi
22	MF	MKD	Darko Tasevski

== Thai League ==
Pos	Team	Pld	W	D	L	GF	GA	GD	Pts	Qualification or relegation
1	Muangthong United (C, Q)	31	26	2	3	73	24	+49	80	2017 AFC Champions League group stage
2	Bangkok United (Q)	31	23	6	2	71	36	+35	75	2017 AFC Champions League preliminary round 2
3	Bangkok Glass	31	18	3	10	62	41	+21	57	
4	Buriram United	30	15	10	5	55	38	+17	55	
5	Chonburi	31	14	9	8	52	33	+19	51	

Updated to match(es) played on 25 September 2016. Source: Thai League
Rules for classification: 1) points; 2) goal difference; 3) number of goals scored.
(C) Champions; (Q) Qualified for the phase indicated

Date	Opponents	H / A	Result F–A	Scorers	League position	Ref
6 March 2016	Osotspa M-150 Samut Prakan	H	4–1	Ariel (2) 23', 79', Piyachanok 55', Kaimbi 90+3'	1st	
9 March 2016	SCG Muangthong United	A	0–2		6th	
13 March 2016	Army United	H	2–0	Ariel 20', Surachat 55'	3rd	
16 March 2016	Chainat Hornbill	A	3–2	Daniel (2) 40', 88', Bordin 49'	2nd	
30 March 2016	Nakhon Ratchasima Mazda	A	2–1	Surachat 55', Thanasit 90+1'	1st	
3 April 2016	BEC Tero Sasana	H	5–1	Kaimbi 26', Chatree 38', Ariel 58', Peerapong 77', Pravinwat 84'	1st	
23 April 2016	Ratchaburi Mitr Phol	A	3–4	Bordin 10', Ariel (2) 12', 46'	4th	
27 April 2016	Chiangrai United	A	3–1	Ariel (2) 30', 37', Peerapong 90+3'	3rd	
30 April 2016	Navy	H	2–0	Ariel 21' (pen.), Bordin 83'	3rd	
7 May 2016	Bangkok United	H	0–1		3rd	
11 May 2016	Sisaket	H	3–1	Ariel 15', Sarawut 22', Darko 75'	3rd	
14 May 2016	Chonburi	A	1–2	Surachat 12'	3rd	
22 May 2016	Buriram United	H	0–2		4th	
28 May 2016	Suphanburi	A	2–1	Surachat 77', Pravinwat 79'	4th	
11 June 2016	Sukhothai	H	2–1	Surachat (2) 41', 65'	3rd	
19 June 2016	Pattaya United	A	1–2	Surachat 89'	3rd	
22 June 2016	BBCU	H	3–1	Ariel (2) 19', 82', Sarawut 90+1'	3rd	
25 June 2016	Super Power Samut Prakan (Note: In mid-2016, Osotspa M-150 Samut Prakan change the name to Super Power Samut Prakan due to their take over.)	A	2–1	Daniel 59', Gasmi 74'	3rd	
29 June 2016	SCG Muangthong United	H	1–2	Ariel 90+2' (pen.)	3rd	
2 July 2016	Army United	A	0–0		3rd	
9 July 2016	Nakhon Ratchasima Mazda	H	2–1	Jakkapan 37', Surachat 84'	3rd	
16 July 2016	BEC Tero Sasana	A	4–1	Gasmi 28', Surachat 53', Ariel 60', Jakkapan 90+4'	3rd	
20 July 2016	Ratchaburi Mitr Phol	H	3–0	Cissé 45+2', Peerapong 58', Ariel 60' (pen.)	3rd	
24 July 2016	Chiangrai United	H	3–1	Daniel 12', Sarawut 34', Pichit 63'	3rd	
31 July 2016	Navy	A	0–1		3rd	
6 August 2016	Bangkok United	A	2–4	Chatree 54', Jakkapan 64'	3rd	
13 August 2016	Sisaket	A	3–3	Gasmi (2) 35', 76', Ariel 37',	3rd	
20 August 2016	Chonburi	H	1–1	Surachat 13'	4th	
10 September 2016	Buriram United	A	1–2	Ariel 72'	4th	
18 September 2016	Suphanburi	H	3–1	Sarawut 11', Ariel 84', Daniel 90+2'	4th	
24 September 2016	Sukhothai	A	1–0	Ariel 79'	3rd	

== Thai FA Cup ==
Chang FA Cup

Date	Opponents	H / A	Result F–A	Scorers	Round	Ref
15 June 2016	Bangkok Christian College	A	6–0	Tassanapong 16', Warut 25', Pakin 45+2', Surachat (2) 61', 86', Ongart 67'	Round of 64	
13 July 2016	Chiangrai United	A	1–2	Ariel 90+8'	Round of 32	

== Thai League Cup ==
Toyota League Cup

Date	Opponents	H / A	Result F–A	Scorers	Round	Ref
10 April 2016	Yala United	A	2–1	Ariel 60' (pen.), Chatree 87'	Round of 64	
8 June 2016	Port	A	0–1		Round of 32	

== Squad goals statistics ==
No.	Pos.	Name	League	FA Cup	League Cup	Total
1	GK	(Thailand) Narit Taweekul	0	0	0	0
2	DF	(Thailand) Apiwich Phulek	0	0	0	0
4	DF	(Australia) Matt Smith	0	0	0	0
5	DF	(Thailand) Pravinwat Boonyong	2	0	0	2
7	FW	(Costa Rica) Ariel Rodríguez	19	1	1	21
8	MF	(Spain) Daniel García	5	0	0	5
9	FW	(Thailand) Surachat Sareepim	10	2	0	12
10	MF	(Thailand) Pakin Kaikaew	0	1	0	1
14	MF	(Thailand) Sarawut Masuk	4	0	0	4
16	MF	(Thailand) Jakkapan Pornsai	3	0	0	3
17	DF	(Thailand) Supachai Komsilp	0	0	0	0
19	DF	(Thailand) Pichit Ketsro	1	0	0	1
20	FW	(Thailand) Nantawat Suankaew	0	0	0	0
21	DF	(Thailand) Jetsadakorn Hemdaeng	0	0	0	0
22	MF	(Mali) Kalifa Cissé	1	0	0	1
23	MF	(Thailand) Peerapong Pichitchotirat (vc)	3	0	0	3
24	MF	(Thailand) Siwakorn Sangwong	0	0	0	0
26	DF	(Thailand) Mehtanon Sudsean	0	0	0	0
27	GK	(Thailand) Wanlop Sae-Jiu	0	0	0	0
28	MF	(Thailand) Ongart Pamonprasert	0	1	0	1
29	FW	(Thailand) Chatree Chimtalay (c)	2	0	1	3
32	FW	(Thailand) Warut Boonsuk	0	1	0	1
33	GK	(Thailand) Jaturong Samakorn	0	0	0	0
34	DF	(Thailand) Piyachanok Darit	1	0	0	1
35	MF	(Thailand) Tassanapong Muaddarak	0	1	0	1
36	DF	(Thailand) Suwannapat Kingkkaew	0	0	0	0
38	DF	(Thailand) Torsak Sa-ardeiem	0	0	0	0
40	FW	(France) Romain Gasmi	4	0	0	4
Left club during season
–	MF	(Thailand) Thanasit Siriphala	1	0	0	1
–	MF	(Thailand) Suban Ngernprasert	0	0	0	0
–	MF	(Thailand) Bordin Phala	3	0	0	3
–	MF	(North Macedonia) Darko Tasevski	1	0	0	1
–	FW	(Namibia) Lazarus Kaimbi	2	0	0	2
–	DF	(Thailand) Nattaphol Sukchai	0	0	0	0

== Transfers ==
First Thai footballer's market is opening on 14 December 2015 to 28 January 2016
Second Thai footballer's market is opening on 3 June 2016 to 30 June 2016

=== In ===
Date	Pos.	Name	From
18 December 2015	FW	(Namibia) Lazarus Kaimbi	Free Agent
31 December 2015	GK	(Thailand) Wanlop Sae-Jiu	(Thailand) Chainat Hornbill
4 January 2016	MF	(Thailand) Sarawut Masuk	(Thailand) SCG Muangthong United
4 January 2016	DF	(Thailand) Pichit Ketsro	(Thailand) Army United
15 January 2016	FW	(Costa Rica) Ariel Rodríguez	(Costa Rica) Deportivo Saprissa
26 May 2016	MF	(Thailand) Jakkapan Pornsai	(Thailand) Suphanburi
14 June 2016	MF	(Mali) Kalifa Cissé	(Thailand) Bangkok United
20 June 2016	FW	(France) Romain Gasmi	(Thailand) Chiangmai
25 June 2016	DF	(Thailand) Apiwich Phulek	(Thailand) Suphanburi
15 July 2016	FW	(Thailand) Surachat Sareepim	(Thailand) Police United

=== Out ===
Date	Pos.	Name	To
19 December 2015	DF	(Thailand) Wasan Homsaen	(Thailand) Suphanburi
25 December 2015	FW	(Japan) Goshi Okubo	(Thailand) PTT Rayong
25 December 2015	MF	(Thailand) Narong Jansawek	(Thailand) Chonburi
25 December 2015	FW	(Thailand) Anan Buasang	(Thailand) Buriram United
25 December 2015	FW	(Brazil) Leandro Oliveira	(Thailand) PTT Rayong
14 January 2016	DF	(Thailand) Worawut Namvech	(Thailand) Chiangrai United
19 January 2016	GK	(Thailand) Pornchai Kasikonudompaisan	(Thailand) Chiangmai
27 January 2016	DF	(Thailand) Tossaphol Chomchon	(Thailand) Chiangmai
1 February 2016	FW	(Spain) Aridane Santana	(Spain) Mirandés
16 February 2016	GK	(Thailand) Sarawut Konglarp	(Thailand) Sukhothai
26 May 2016	MF	(Thailand) Thanasit Siriphala	(Thailand) Suphanburi
26 May 2016	MF	(Thailand) Suban Ngernprasert	(Thailand) Suphanburi
27 May 2016	MF	(Thailand) Bordin Phala	(Thailand) Chiangrai United
9 June 2016	MF	(North Macedonia) Darko Tasevski	(Thailand) Suphanburi
21 June 2016	FW	(Namibia) Lazarus Kaimbi	(Thailand) Chiangrai United
24 June 2016	DF	(Thailand) Nattaphol Sukchai	(Thailand) Chiangmai
24 June 2016	MF	(Thailand) Surasak Somrat	(Thailand) Chiangmai

=== Loan in ===
Date from	Date to	Pos.	Name	From
9 February 2016	15 July 2016	FW	(Thailand) Surachat Sareepim	(Thailand) Police United
