= 2018 Bangkok Glass F.C. season =

Bangkok Glass
2018 season
- Chairman: Pavin Bhirombhakdi
- Head coach: Josep Ferré
- Stadium: Leo Stadium, Thanyaburi, Pathum Thani, Thailand
- Thai League: 14th (Relegated ▼)
- Thai FA Cup: Round of 32
- Thai League Cup: Runners-up
- Top goalscorer: League: David Bala (8); Surachat Sareepim (8); All: Surachat Sareepim (11)
- All statistics correct as of 27 October 2018.

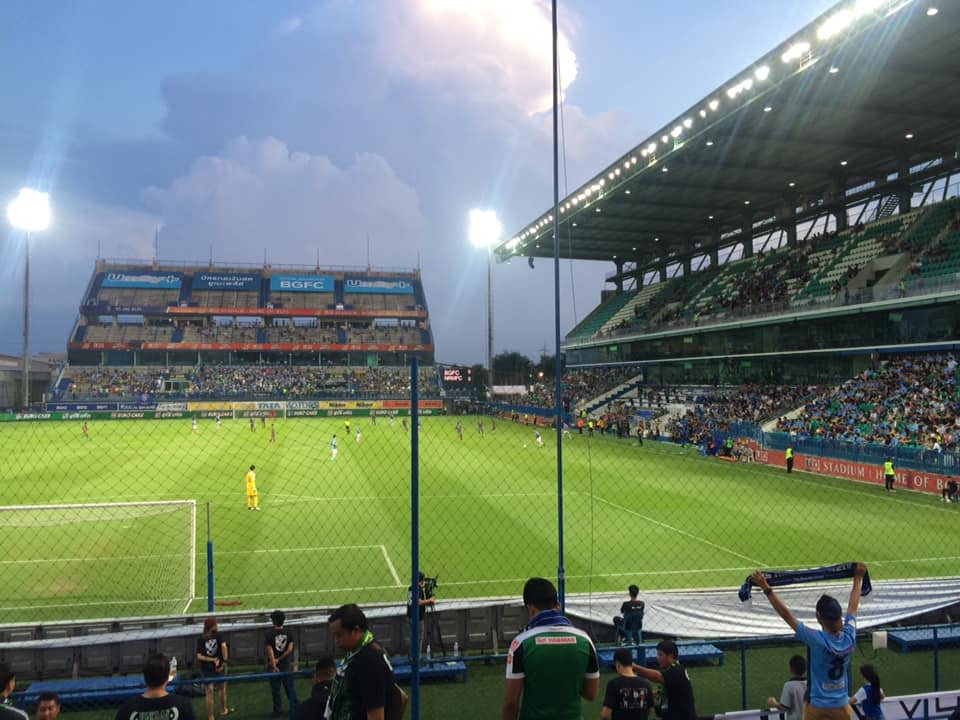
Leo Stadion, 2018

The 2018 season is Bangkok Glass Football Club's 10th season in the new era since they took over from Krung Thai Bank Football Club in 2009. It is the 3rd season in the Thai League and club's 10th consecutive season in the top flight of the Thai football league system since taking over in the 2009 season.

== League by seasons ==
Season	League	Position	Notes
2009	Thai Premier League	3rd	Began of the new era by competed as Bangkok Glass F.C.
2010	Thai Premier League	5th	
2011	Thai Premier League	5th	
2012	Thai Premier League	8th	
2013	Thai Premier League	5th	
2014	Thai Premier League	10th	
2015	Thai Premier League	6th	
2016	Thai League	3rd	Thai Premier League renamed to Thai League
2017	Thai League	5th	
2018	Thai League	14th	Relegated to Thai League 2

== Competitions ==
=== Thai League ===
Date	Opponents	H / A	Result F–A	Scorers	League position
11 February 2018	Nakhon Ratchasima Mazda	A	0–1		15th
18 February 2018	Buriram United	A	0–1		18th
24 February 2018	Navy	A	0–0		16th
4 March 2018	Port	H	2–0	Mendy 3', Mario 8'	13th
10 March 2018	Chonburi	A	2–0	Mendy 50', Smith 87'	9th
17 March 2018	PT Prachuap	H	3–4	Smith 12', Mario (2) 80', 90+5' (pen.)	11th
28 March 2018	Pattaya United	H	0–1		13th
1 April 2018	SCG Muangthong United	A	2–2	Mendy 32', Toti 53'	14th
7 April 2018	Police Tero	H	4–1	Mario 2', Mendy 46', Thitipan 58', Toti 90+3'	13th
11 April 2018	Sukhothai	A	1–1	Smith 1'	13th
20 April 2018	Bangkok United	H	0–1		14th
25 April 2018	Ratchaburi Mitr Phol	A	1–2	Thitipan 13'	14th
28 April 2018	Chainat Hornbill	H	2–5	Piyachanok 73', Thitipan 87'	15th
5 May 2018	Chiangrai United	A	1–1	Surachat 47'	15th
13 May 2018	Air Force Central	H	2–0	Apisit 5', Surachat 45+2'	15th
20 May 2018	Suphanburi	H	1–0	Toti 28'	15th
26 May 2018	Ubon UMT United	A	0–0		14th
9 June 2018	Buriram United	H	1–2	Surachat 5'	15th
17 June 2018	Navy	H	0–1		15th
24 June 2018	Port	A	2–3	Anon 48', David 67'	15th
1 July 2018	Chonburi	H	7–4	Ariel (3) 2', 61', 76', Surachat (2) 19', 90', Anon 28', David 68'	15th
7 July 2018	PT Prachuap	A	0–1		15th
15 July 2018	Pattaya United	A	1–1	Ariel 33'	15th
21 July 2018	SCG Muangthong United	H	3–1	David (2) 82', 89', Toti 86'	13th
29 July 2018	Police Tero	A	3–0	Toti 49', Surachat 67', Thitipan 82'	12th
4 August 2018	Sukhothai	H	5–1	Surachat 51', Narongrit 61' (o.g.), Ariel 74', Anon 79', David 90'	11th
5 September 2018	Bangkok United	A	2–3	Thitipan 42', Ariel 50'	11th
9 September 2018	Ratchaburi Mitr Phol	H	2–1	Chatree (2) 72', 76'	10th
12 September 2018	Chainat Hornbill	A	1–1	Chatree 26'	10th
15 September 2018	Chiangrai United	H	0–0		10th
23 September 2018	Air Force Central	A	5–2	David (2) 6', 45+1', Chakkit 49', Surachat 82', Ernesto 89' (o.g.)	10th
30 September 2018	Suphanburi	A	0–2		12th
3 October 2018	Ubon UMT United	H	1–1	David 5'	12th
7 October 2018	Nakhon Ratchasima Mazda	H	1–2	Toti 30'	14th

Pos	Team	Pld	W	D	L	GF	GA	GD	Pts	Qualification or relegation
12	Ratchaburi Mitr Phol	34	12	7	15	50	53	−3	43 (Note: Sukhothai ahead on head-to-head record; Sukhothai 4 pts, Ratchaburi Mitr Phol 1 pt.)	
13	Chainat Hornbill	34	11	9	14	46	52	−6	42 (Note: Chainat Hornbill ahead on head-to-head record; Chainat Hornbill 4 pts, Bangkok Glass 1 pt.)	
14	Bangkok Glass (R)	34	11	9	14	55	46	+9	42	Relegation to the 2019 Thai League 2
15	Police Tero (R)	34	10	6	18	53	66	−13	36	Relegation to the 2019 Thai League 2
16	Navy (R)	34	7	9	18	44	85	−41	30	Relegation to the 2019 Thai League 2

Source: Thai League
Rules for classification: 1) Points; 2) Head-to-head points; 3) Head-to-head goals difference; 4) Head-to-head goals scored; 5) Overall goals difference; 6) Overall goals scored; 7) Fair play points; 8) Play-off without extra time;).
(R) Relegated

=== Thai FA Cup ===
Date	Opponents	H / A	Result F–A	Scorers	Round
27 June 2018	Naresuan	A	4–1	Chatree (2) 15', 90+1', Surachat 64', Warut 86'	Round of 64
4 July 2018	Ratchaburi Mitr Phol	H	1–3 (a.e.t.)	Sarawut 5'	Round of 32

=== Thai League Cup ===
Date	Opponents	H / A	Result F–A	Scorers	Round
13 June 2018	Trat	A	2–0	Anon 67', Chatree 72'	Round of 32
11 July 2018	Nakhon Pathom United	A	1–0	Ariel 36' (pen.)	Round of 16
8 August 2018	Chonburi	A	6–4 (a.e.t.)	Anon 1', Ariel 76', Chatree (2) 77', 90+4', David 98', Surachat 119'	Quarter-finals
19 September 2018	Buriram United	N	2–1	Surachat 12', David 84'	Semi-finals
20 October 2018	Chiangrai United	N	0–1		Final
