= 2018 Thai League Cup final =

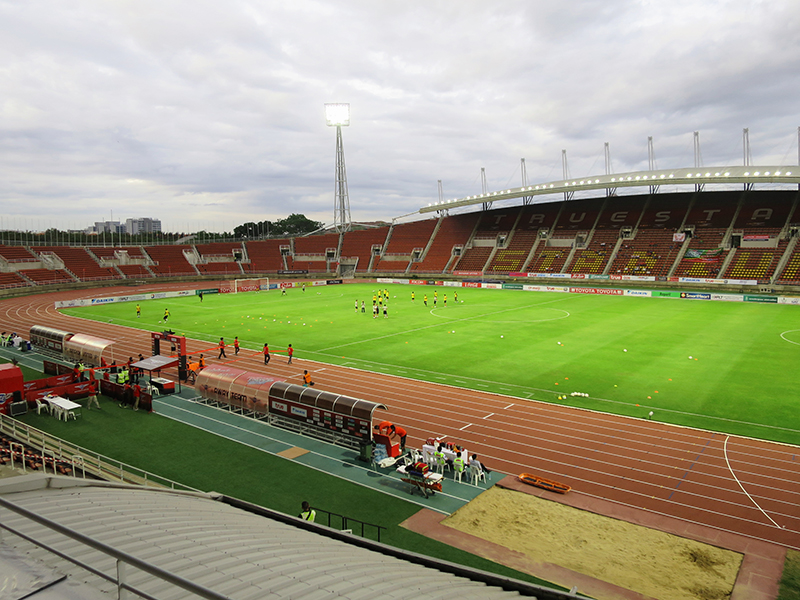
- The match took place at Thammasat Stadium.
- Event: 2018 Thai League Cup
Chiangrai United	Bangkok Glass
1	0
- Date: 20 October 2018
- Venue: Thammasat Stadium, Pathum Thani
- Man of the Match: Chatchai Budprom
- Referee: Chairoek Ngamsom (Thailand)
- Attendance: 14,380
- Weather: Thunderstorms; 26 °C (79 °F) humidity 95%

The 2018 Thai League Cup final was the final match of the 2018 Thai League Cup, the 9th season in the second era of a Thailand's football tournament organised by Football Association of Thailand. It was played at the Thammasat Stadium in Pathum Thani, Thailand on 20 October 2018, between Chiangrai United a big team from the Northern part and Bangkok Glass a big team from the metropolitan region of Thailand.

== Road to the final ==
Chiangrai United (T1)		Round	Bangkok Glass (T1)	
Opponent	Result	Knockout 1 leg	Opponent	Result
Army United (T2)	6–1 (A)	Round of 32	Trat (T2)	2–0 (A)
Police Tero (T1)	4–2 (H)	Round of 16	Nakhon Pathom United (T4)	1–0 (A)
Air Force Central (T1)	1–0 (H)	Quarter-finals	Chonburi (T1)	6–4 (a.e.t.) (A)
Nakhon Ratchasima Mazda (T1)	1–1 (a.e.t.) (3–1 p) (N)	Semi-finals	Buriram United (T1)	2–1 (N)

Note: In all results below, the score of the finalist is given first (H: home; A: away; T1: Clubs from Thai League; T2: Clubs from Thai League 2; T4: Clubs from Thai League 4.

== Match ==
=== Details ===
20 October 2018
20:15 UTC+7

Chiangrai United	1–0	Bangkok Glass
William Henrique 65'	Report; Highlight

Thammasat Stadium, Pathum Thani
Attendance: 14,380
Referee: Chairoek Ngamsom (Thailand)

Chiangrai United	Bangkok Glass

Lineups:
GK	1	(Thailand) Chatchai Budprom
DF	3	(Thailand) Tanasak Srisai		(yellow card) 90+4'
DF	4	(Thailand) Piyaphon Phanichakul		(yellow card) 81'	(substituted off) 83'
DF	5	(Brazil) Victor Cardozo (c)
DF	30	(Thailand) Suriya Singmui
DF	33	(Thailand) Sarawut Inpaen
DF	36	(Thailand) Shinnaphat Leeaoh		(yellow card) 84'
MF	8	(South Korea) Lee Yong-rae
MF	27	(Thailand) Apisorn Phumchat		(yellow card) 24'
FW	9	(Brazil) Bill
FW	11	(Brazil) William Henrique	65'
Substitutes:
GK	20	(Thailand) Wanlop Saechio
GK	28	(Thailand) Saranon Anuin
GK	40	(Thailand) Farus Patee
DF	2	(Thailand) Atit Daosawang
MF	10	(Thailand) Siwakorn Tiatrakul		(yellow card) 87'	(substituted on) 83'
MF	45	(Thailand) Adisak Klinkosoom
FW	16	(Thailand) Akarawin Sawasdee
Head Coach:
(Brazil) Alexandre Gama

Lineups:
GK	1	(Thailand) Narit Taweekul
DF	4	(Australia) Matt Smith (c)
DF	19	(Thailand) Pichit Ketsro		(substituted off) 75'
DF	33	(Thailand) Saharat Pongsuwan
MF	5	(Thailand) Tanaboon Kesarat
MF	17	(Thailand) Chakkit Laptrakul	(yellow card) 82'
MF	20	(Spain) Toti		(substituted off) 66'
MF	23	(Thailand) Peerapong Pichitchotirat	(yellow card) 58'
MF	27	(Thailand) Anon Amornlertsak		(substituted off) 67'
FW	7	(Costa Rica) Ariel Rodríguez
FW	9	(Thailand) Surachat Sareepim	(yellow card) 37'
Substitutes:
GK	38	(Thailand) Korraphat Nareechan
DF	28	(Thailand) Apisit Sorada
DF	34	(Thailand) Piyachanok Darit
MF	14	(Thailand) Sarawut Masuk		(substituted on) 75'
MF	22	(Thailand) Nattachai Srisuwan
MF	24	(Thailand) Siwakorn Sangwong		(substituted on) 66'
MF	35	(Thailand) Tassanapong Muaddarak
FW	10	(Brazil) David Bala		(substituted on) 67'
FW	32	(Thailand) Warut Boonsuk
Head Coach:
(Thailand) Anurak Srikerd

Assistant referees:
(Thailand) Rachen Srichai
(Thailand) Komsan Kamphaen
Fourth official:
(Thailand) Wiwat Jumpa-on
Match Commissioner:
(Thailand) Peerapol Pu-udom
Referee Assessor:
(Thailand) Pirom Un-prasert

MATCH RULES

- 90 minutes.
- 30 minutes extra-time if necessary.
- Penalty shoot-out if still necessary.
- Maximum of three substitutions.

== Winner ==
2018 Thai League Cup
Winners
Chiangrai United
First Title

=== Prizes for winner ===
- A champion trophy.
- 5,000,000 THB prize money.

=== Prizes for runners-up ===
- 1,000,000 THB prize money.

== See also ==
- 2018 Thai League
- 2018 Thai League 2
- 2018 Thai League 3
- 2018 Thai League 4
- 2018 Thai FA Cup
- 2018 Thai League Cup
