= 2013 Thailand national football team results =

Thailand
2013 season
- Manager: (Germany) Winfried Schäfer (until 4 June 2013) (Thailand) Kiatisuk Senamuang (Caretaker 5 June 2013) (until 16 June 2013) (Thailand) Surachai Jaturapattarapong (from 19 August 2013) (until 19 November 2013)
- Stadium: Rajamangala Stadium; 700th Anniversary Stadium
Home colours	Away colours

This article details the fixtures and results of the Thailand national football team in 2013.

== Record ==
Competition	GP	W	D	L	GF	GA	GD
2015 AFC Asian Cup qualification	5	0	0	5	5	16	-11
International Friendly	1	1	0	0	5	1	+4
International Friendly (not A-match)	4	1	1	2	4	6	0
Total	10	2	1	7	14	23	-9

== Goalscorers ==
Player	2015 ACQ	Friendly	Not A Match	Total Goals
Narubadin Weerawatnodom			1	1
Teeratep Winothai			1	1
Datsakorn Thonglao			1	1
Chanathip Songkrasin	1	1		2
Thitipan Puangchan	2			2
Pokklaw Anan		1		1
Adisak Kraisorn		1		1
Sarawut Masuk		1		1
Teerasil Dangda	1			1
Mongkol Tossakrai	1			1

== vs Finland ==
International friendly (2013 King's Cup) — B Matches

23 January 2013
19:00 UTC+7:00

Thailand	1–3	Finland
Narubodin 68'	Report	Sumusalo 5'; Forssell 12', 87'

700th Anniversary Stadium, Chiang Mai, Thailand
Attendance: 23,000
Referee: Vo Minh Tri (Vietnam)

Thailand	Finland

GK	18	Sinthaweechai Hathairattanakool
RB	17	Narubadin Weerawatnodom
CB	5	Jetsada Jitsawad
CB	4	Chonlatit Jantakam
LB	3	Weerawut Kayem		(substituted off) 18'
CM	19	Adul Lahsoh
CM	7	Datsakorn Thonglao (c)	(yellow card) 47'
CM	8	Sumanya Purisai
RW	23	Chanathip Songkrasin
LW	14	Teeratep Winothai		(substituted off) 62'
CF	9	Kirati Keawsombat		(substituted off) 76'
Substitutions:
DF	24	Supachai Komsilp	(yellow card) 23'	(substituted in) 18'
MF	15	Arthit Sunthornphit		(substituted in) 62'
FW	13	Chatree Chimtalay		(substituted in) 76'
Manager:
(Germany) Winfried Schäfer

GK	23	Jesse Joronen
RB	13	Kari Arkivuo	(substituted off) 75'
CB	4	Joona Toivio (c)
CB	15	Markus Halsti	(substituted off) 80'
LB	5	Mikko Sumusalo	(substituted off) 90'
CM	6	Mika Väyrynen
CM	8	Teemu Tainio	(substituted off) 46'
CM	10	Rasmus Schüller
RW	21	Kasper Hämäläinen	(substituted off) 65'
LW	11	Riku Riski	(substituted off) 75'
CF	9	Mikael Forssell
Substitutions:
MF	20	Joni Kauko	(substituted in) 46'
MF	7	Sebastian Mannström	(substituted in) 65'
MF	17	Roni Porokara	(substituted in) 75'
DF	2	Jarkko Hurme	(substituted in) 75'
DF	14	Paulus Arajuuri	(substituted in) 80'
DF	22	Tuomas Rannankari	(substituted in) 90'
Manager:
(Finland) Mixu Paatelainen

Assistant referees:
Thanom Borikut (Thailand)
Anuwat Feemuichang (Thailand)
Fourth official:
Chaiya Mahapab (Thailand)

== vs North Korea ==
International friendly (2013 King's Cup) — B Matches

26 January 2013
15:00 UTC+7:00

Thailand	2–2	North Korea
Teeratep 26' (pen.); Datsakorn 61'	Report	Pak Jo-Kwang 58'; Pak Hyon-Il 70'

700th Anniversary Stadium, Chiang Mai, Thailand
Attendance: 7,000
Referee: Vo Minh Tri (Vietnam)

Thailand	North Korea

GK	1	Chatchai Budprom
RB	17	Narubadin Weerawatnodom
CB	6	Atit Daosawang
CB	4	Chonlatit Jantakam
LB	24	Supachai Komsilp		(substituted off) 46'
CM	19	Adul Lahsoh		(substituted off) 52'
CM	7	Datsakorn Thonglao (c)
RW	23	Chanathip Songkrasin		(substituted off) 67'
AM	8	Sumanya Purisai	(yellow card) 64'
LW	14	Teeratep Winothai
CF	13	Chatree Chimtalay		(substituted off) 72'
Substitutions:
DF	3	Weerawut Kayem	(yellow card) 78'	(substituted in) 46'
MF	21	Thitipan Puangchan		(substituted in) 56'
FW	15	Tana Chanabut		(substituted in) 67'
DF	2	Apiwat Ngaolamhin		(substituted in) 72'
Manager:
(Germany) Winfried Schäfer

GK	1	Ri Myong-guk (c)
RB	17	Kim Chol-Bom
CB	5	Jang Kuk-chol
CB	6	Kang Kuk-chol
LB	12	Jon Kwang-ik
RM	19	Hong Kum-song
CM	14	Yun Il-kwang
CM	10	Pak Song-il
LM	20	So Kyong-jin
CF	11	Jong Il-gwan (yellow card) 25'
CF	22	Kim Ju-song
Manager:
(North Korea) Yun Jong-su

== vs Kuwait(1) ==
2015 AFC Asian Cup qualification

6 February 2013
19:00 UTC+7:00

Thailand	1–3	Kuwait
Chanathip 76'	Report	Theeraton 25' (o.g.); Fadel 59'; Aman 65'

Rajamangala Stadium, Bangkok, Thailand
Attendance: 15,000
Referee: Ryuji Sato (Japan)

Thailand	Kuwait

GK	1	Kawin Thamsatchanan
RB	23	Piyapol Bantao
CB	2	Panupong Wongsa (c)
CB	4	Chonlatit Jantakam	(yellow card) 57'
LB	3	Theeraton Bunmathan
CM	12	Adul Lahsoh		(substituted off) 79'
CM	19	Pichitphong Choeichiu
RW	16	Jakkapan Pornsai		(substituted off) 72'
AM	7	Datsakorn Thonglao	(yellow card) 83'
LW	11	Anucha Kitpongsri		(substituted off) 59'
CF	10	Teerasil Dangda
Substitutions:
FW	9	Kirati Keawsombat		(substituted in) 59'
MF	20	Chanathip Songkrasin		(substituted in) 72'
MF	17	Apipoo Suntornpanavej		(substituted in) 79'
Manager:
(Germany) Winfried Schäfer

GK	22	Nawaf Al-Khaldi (c)
RB	6	Mohammad Frieh
CB	4	Hussain Fadhel	(yellow card) 39'
CB	14	Hussain Hakem
LB	3	Fahad Awadh
RM	7	Fahad Al Enezi	(yellow card) 45+2'	(substituted off) 65'
CM	8	Talal Nayef
CM	11	Fahad Al Ansari
LM	15	Waleed Ali	(yellow card) 19'	(substituted off) 76'
CF	17	Bader Al-Mutawa
CF	20	Yousef Nasser	(yellow card) 82'	(substituted off) 89'
Substitutions:
FW	16	Hamad Aman		(substituted in) 65'
MF	21	Ali Maqseed		(substituted in) 76'
FW	10	Abdul Rahman Al Shammari		(substituted in) 89'
Manager:
(Serbia) Goran Tufegdžić

Assistant referees:
Toshiyuki Nagi (Japan)
Satoshi Karakami (Japan)
Fourth official:
Tayeb Hassan (Bangladesh)

== vs Qatar ==
International friendly — not full A-match

17 March 2013
UTC+3:00

Qatar	1–0	Thailand
Ibrahim 56'	Report

Jassim Bin Hamad Stadium, Doha, Qatar

Qatar	Thailand

== vs Lebanon ==
2015 AFC Asian Cup qualification

22 March 2013
17:30 UTC+2

Lebanon	5–2	Thailand
Chaito 6', 22'; Haidar 31'; Maatouk 72'; Onika 90+1'	Report	Thitipan 49', 85'

(Lebanon) Camille Chamoun Sports City Stadium, Beirut
Attendance: 7,000
Referee: Kim Dong-Jin (South Korea)

Lebanon	Thailand

GK	23	Abbas Hassan
RB	19	Ali Hamam
CB	3	Youssef Mohamad
CB	4	Mootaz Jounaidi
LB	18	Walid Ismail	(yellow card) 59'
CM	20	Roda Antar (c)	(yellow card) 50'	(substituted off) 68'
CM	6	Mohammed Shamas		(substituted off) 58'
RW	7	Hassan Maatouk
AM	10	Abbas Ahmed Atwi		(substituted off) 61'
LW	8	Hassan Chaito
CF	9	Mohamad Haidar
Substitutions:
MF	15	Haitham Faour		(substituted in) 58'
MF	9	Adnan Haidar		(substituted in) 61'
MF	13	Abbas Ali Atwi		(substituted in) 68'
Manager:
(Germany) Theo Bücker

GK	23	Siwarak Tedsungnoen
RB	6	Narubadin Weerawatnodom	(yellow card) 9'	(substituted off) 54'
CB	21	Prayad Boonya
CB	4	Apiwat Ngaolamhin	(yellow card) 34'
LB	3	Theerathon Bunmathan
CM	15	Surat Sukha
CM	14	Anthony Ampaipitakwong
RW	16	Jakkapan Pornsai		(substituted off) 30'
AM	7	Datsakorn Thonglao (c)
LW	11	Anucha Kitpongsri		(substituted off) 46'
CF	10	Teerasil Dangda
Substitutions:
MF	19	Thitipan Puangchan		(substituted in) 30'
MF	20	Chanathip Songkrasin		(substituted in) 46'
DF	5	Atit Daosawang		(substituted in) 54'
Manager:
(Germany) Winfried Schäfer

Assistant referees:
Jeong Hae-sang (South Korea)
Yang Byoung-Eun (South Korea)
Fourth official:
Kim Dae Yong (South Korea)

== vs China ==
International friendly

15 June 2013
18:30 UTC+8:00

China	1–5	Thailand
Wang Yongpo 33' (pen.)	Report	Pokklaw 16'; Adisak 23', 51'; Chanathip 61'; Sarawut 87'

Hefei Olympic Sports Center Stadium, Hefei, China PR
Attendance: 25,000
Referee: Kim Hee-Gon (South Korea)

China	Thailand

GK	12	Geng Xiaofeng
RB	19	Zhao Peng
CB	6	Feng Xiaoting		(substituted off) 29'
CB	4	Zhou Yun (c)		(substituted off) 29'
LB	16	Zheng Zheng
CM	17	Liu Jian	(yellow card) 44'	(substituted off) 46'
CM	11	Qin Sheng		(substituted off) 29'
RW	26	Wu Lei
AM	8	Wang Yongpo
LW	20	Yu Hanchao		(substituted off) 80'
CF	22	Yu Dabao		(substituted off) 46'
Substitutions:
DF	24	Lang Zheng		(substituted in) 29'
MF	7	Zhao Xuri		(substituted in) 29'
MF	13	Sun Ke		(substituted in) 29'
FW	18	Gao Lin		(substituted in) 46'
FW	9	Yang Xu		(substituted in) 46'
MF	21	Yu Hai		(substituted in) 80'
Manager:
(Spain) José Antonio Camacho

GK	1	Sinthaweechai Hathairattanakool (c)
RB	8	Putthinan Wannasri		(substituted off) 89'
CB	5	Atit Daosawang	(yellow card) 32'
CB	27	Pairote Sokam
LB	3	Theerathon Bunmathan
CM	12	Adul Lahsoh		(substituted off) 75'
CM	7	Pokklaw Anan		(substituted off) 69'
CM	25	Thitipan Puangchan		(substituted off) 89'
RW	23	Pakorn Prempak		(substituted off) 60'
LW	18	Chanathip Songkrasin
CF	9	Adisak Kraisorn		(substituted off) 82'
Substitutions:
MF	11	Sarawut Masuk		(substituted in) 60'
MF	24	Kroekrit Thaweekarn		(substituted in) 69'
MF	20	Tanaboon Kesarat		(substituted in) 75'
MF	13	Pinyo Inpinit		(substituted in) 82'
DF	17	Peerapat Notchaiya		(substituted in) 89'
DF	26	Narubadin Weerawatnodom		(substituted in) 89'
Manager:
(Thailand) Kiatisuk Senamuang (Caretaker)

Assistant referees:
Kang Do-Jun (South Korea)
Choi Min-Byoung (South Korea)
Fourth official:
Wang Zhe (China)

== vs Bahrain ==
International friendly — not full A-match

10 October 2013
19:00 UTC+7:00

Thailand	1–0	Bahrain
Chatree 49'	Report

Rajamangala Stadium, Bangkok, Thailand
Referee: Chaiya Mahapab (Thailand)

Thailand	Bahrain

GK	20	Sinthaweechai Hathairattanakool (c)
RB	23	Wasan Homsan
CB	3	Pratum Chuthong	(substituted off) 78'
CB	4	Chonlatit Jantakam	(substituted off) 89'
LB	11	Korrakot Wiriyaudomsiri	(substituted off) 85'
CM	12	Adul Lahsoh	(substituted off) 46'
CM	19	Pichit Jaibun
CM	13	Jakkaphan Kaewprom	(substituted off) 12'
RW	20	Narong Jansawek
LW	7	Surachet Ngamtip	(substituted off) 67'
CF	10	Teerasil Dangda
Substitutions:
FW	9	Chatree Chimtalay	(substituted in) 12'
MF	17	Ratchapol Nawanno	(substituted in) 46'
MF	16	Mongkol Tossakrai	(substituted in) 67'
DF	6	Pairote Sokam	(substituted in) 78'
DF	2	Noppol Pitafai	(substituted in) 85'
DF	5	Panuwat Failai	(substituted in) 89'
Manager:
(Thailand) Surachai Jaturapattarapong

GK	1	Sayed Mohammed Jaffer	(substituted off) 46'
RB	23	Abdulla Saleh	(substituted off) 75'
CB	5	Saleh Abdulhameed
CB	2	Mohamed Husain (c)	(substituted off) 3'
LB	24	Rashed Al-Hooti
RM	13	Mahmood Abdulrahman	(substituted off) 46'
CM	7	Abdulwahab Al-Safi
CM	8	Sayed Jaafar Ahmed
LM	19	Issa Muthanna	(substituted off) 66'
CF	9	Abdulwahab Al-Malood
CF	20	Sami Al-Husaini	(substituted off) 70'
Substitutions:
DF	17	Abdulla Al-Haza'a	(substituted in) 3'
GK	22	Ashraf Waheed Al Sebaie	(substituted in) 46'
MF	4	Sayed Dhiya Saeed	(substituted in) 46'
FW	11	Hamad Al Dakheel	(substituted in) 66'
MF	10	Mohamed Salmeen	(substituted in) 70'
MF	6	Dawood Saad	(substituted in) 75'
Manager:
(England) Anthony Hudson

Assistant referees:
Sumate Saiwaew (Thailand)
Nirut Ruengsrichat (Thailand)
Fourth official:
Mongkolchai Pechsri (Thailand)

== vs Iran(1) ==
2015 AFC Asian Cup qualification

15 October 2013
19:00 UTC+3:30

Iran	2–1	Thailand
Hosseini 67'; Ghoochannejhad 70'	Report	Teerasil 80'

(Iran) Azadi Stadium, Tehran
Attendance: 17,330
Referee: Abdullah Balideh (Qatar)

Iran	Thailand

GK	1	Rahman Ahmadi
RB	13	Hossein Mahini	(substituted off) 76'
CB	4	Jalal Hosseini
CB	15	Pejman Montazeri
LB	19	Hashem Beikzadeh
CM	14	Andranik Teymourian
CM	6	Javad Nekounam (c)
RW	21	Ashkan Dejagah	(substituted off) 66'
AM	7	Masoud Shojaei	(substituted off) 79'
LW	9	Mohammad Reza Khalatbari
CF	16	Reza Ghoochannejhad
Substitutions:
FW	10	Karim Ansarifard	(substituted in) 66'
DF	2	Steven Beitashour	(substituted in) 76'
FW	20	Alireza Jahanbakhsh	(substituted in) 79'
Manager:
(Portugal) Carlos Queiroz

GK	18	Sinthaweechai Hathairattanakool (c)
RB	23	Wasan Homsan
CB	3	Pratum Chuthong
CB	4	Chonlatit Jantakam
LB	11	Korrakot Wiriyaudomsiri	(yellow card) 11'
CM	12	Adul Lahsoh
CM	19	Pichit Jaibun	(yellow card) 30'
CM	20	Narong Jansawek	(yellow card) 53'	(substituted off) 88'
RW	7	Surachet Ngamtip		(substituted off) 71'
LW	9	Chatree Chimtalay
CF	10	Teerasil Dangda
Substitutions:
MF	17	Ratchapol Nawanno		(substituted in) 71'
MF	16	Mongkol Tossakrai		(substituted in) 88'
Manager:
(Thailand) Surachai Jaturapattarapong

Assistant referees:
Ramzan Saeed Al Naemi (Qatar)
Juma Al Burshaid (Qatar)
Fourth official:
Khamis Mohamed Al-Kuwari (Qatar)

== vs Iran(2) ==
2015 AFC Asian Cup qualification

15 November 2013
19:00 UTC+7:00

Thailand	0–3	Iran
	Report	Dejagah 28'; Ghoochannejhad 42'; Jahanbakhsh 90+5'

Rajamangala Stadium, Bangkok, Thailand
Attendance: 7,000
Referee: Ben Williams (Australia)

Thailand	Iran

GK	18	Sinthaweechai Hathairattanakool (c)
RB	23	Wasan Homsan
CB	3	Pratum Chuthong	(yellow card) 76'
CB	4	Chonlatit Jantakam	(yellow card) 31'
LB	2	Noppol Pitafai	(yellow card) 32'
RM	8	Suchao Nuchnum		(substituted off) 75'
CM	19	Pichit Jaibun
CM	20	Narong Jansawek		(substituted off) 35'
RM	13	Jakkaphan Kaewprom
CF	9	Chatree Chimtalay		(substituted off) 68'
CF	10	Teerasil Dangda
Substitutions:
FW	21	Phuwadol Suwannachart	(red card) 90+3'	(substituted in) 35'
MF	7	Datsakorn Thonglao		(substituted in) 68'
MF	12	Apipoo Suntornpanavech		(substituted in) 75'
Manager:
(Thailand) Surachai Jaturapattarapong

GK	12	Daniel Davari
RB	2	Steven Beitashour
CB	4	Jalal Hosseini
CB	15	Pejman Montazeri
LB	3	Ehsan Hajsafi	(yellow card) 90+5'
CM	14	Andranik Teymourian
CM	6	Javad Nekounam (c)
RW	21	Ashkan Dejagah	(yellow card) 53'
AM	7	Masoud Shojaei		(substituted off) 86'
LW	8	Mojtaba Jabbari	(yellow card) 16'	(substituted off) 69'
CF	16	Reza Ghoochannejhad		(substituted off) 83'
Substitutions:
FW	9	Mohammad Reza Khalatbari		(substituted in) 69'
FW	10	Karim Ansarifard		(substituted in) 83'
MF	20	Alireza Jahanbakhsh		(substituted in) 86'
Manager:
(Portugal) Carlos Queiroz

Assistant referees:
Matthew Cream (Australia)
Hakan Anaz (Australia)
Fourth official:
Mohd Amirul Izwan (Malaysia)

== vs Kuwait(2) ==
2015 AFC Asian Cup qualification

19 November 2013
18:35 UTC+3

Kuwait	3–1	Thailand
Nasser 19', 71'; Awadh 56' (pen.)	Report	Mongkol 68'

Al Kuwait Sports Club Stadium, Kuwait City
Attendance: 5,000
Referee: Valentin Kovalenko (Uzbekistan)

Kuwait	Thailand

GK	22	Nawaf Al-Khaldi (c)
RB	2	Mohammad Frieh
CB	6	Hussain Hakem
CF	13	Musaed Neda
LB	3	Fahad Awadh
CM	21	Talal Nayef
CM	18	Jarah Al Ateeqi	(substituted off) 70'
RW	7	Fahad Al-Rashidi	(substituted off) 82'
AM	8	Saleh Al Sheikh
LW	15	Waleed Ali	(substituted off) 87'
CF	20	Yousef Nasser
Substitutions:
MF	14	Talal Al-Amer	(substituted in) 70'
FW	9	Ahmad Ajab	(substituted in) 82'
MF	10	Aziz Mashaan	(substituted in) 87'
Manager:
(Brazil) Jorvan Vieira

GK	18	Sinthaweechai Hathairattanakool (c)	(yellow card) 86'
RB	23	Wasan Homsan	(yellow card) 66' (yellow-red card) 90'
CB	15	Suttinan Phuk-hom	(yellow card) 55'
CB	5	Panuwat Failai
LB	2	Noppol Pitafai
CM	13	Sarach Yooyen		(substituted off) 74'
CM	19	Pichit Jaibun
CM	12	Apipoo Suntornpanavech	(yellow card) 60'
RW	20	Narong Jansawek		(substituted off) 57'
LW	14	Teeratep Winothai
CF	10	Teerasil Dangda
Substitutions:
MF	16	Mongkol Tossakrai		(substituted in) 57'
MF	7	Datsakorn Thonglao		(substituted in) 74'
Manager:
(Thailand) Surachai Jaturapattarapong

Assistant referees:
Rafael Ilyasov (Uzbekistan)
Mamur Saidkasimov (Uzbekistan)
Fourth official:
Vladislav Tseytlin (Uzbekistan)
