= 2026 Thai League Cup final =

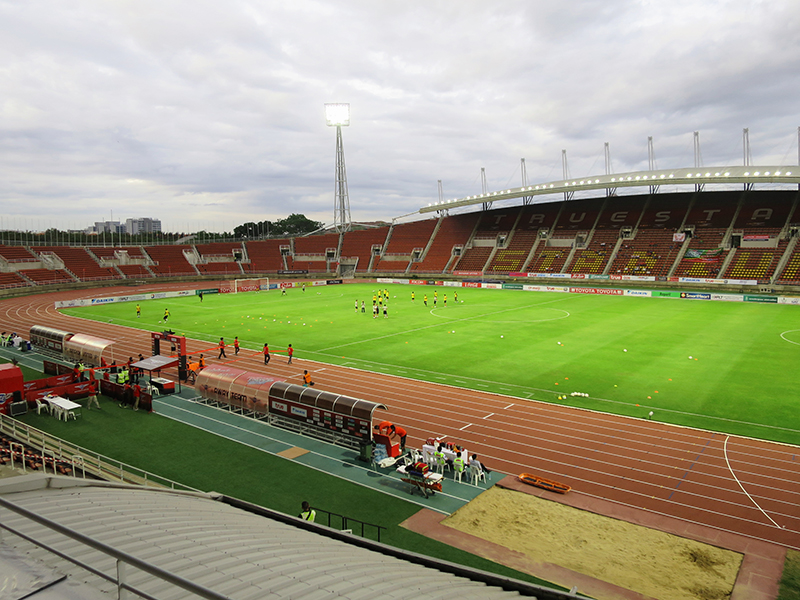
- The match took place at Thammasat Stadium.
- Event: 2025–26 Thai League Cup
BG Pathum United	Port
0	1
- Date: 24 May 2026
- Venue: Thammasat Stadium, Khlong Luang, Pathum Thani
- Man of the Match: Lucas Tocantins (Port)
- Referee: Torphong Somsing (Thailand)
- Attendance: 16,807
- Weather: Mostly cloudy 30 °C (86 °F) humidity 71%

The 2026 Thai League Cup final was the culmination of the 2025–26 Thai League Cup, the 16th season of Thailand's knockout football competition in its second era. The match was played on 24 May 2026 at Thammasat Stadium in Pathum Thani, Thailand. It featured BG Pathum United, based in Thanyaburi, Pathum Thani in the Bangkok Metropolitan Region, and Port, based in Khlong Toei, Bangkok—two of the leading clubs in the Thai League 1. This edition marked a rebranding of the competition following a change in title sponsor, from Toyota Motor Thailand to Muang Thai Life Assurance and Muang Thai Insurance, with the tournament being renamed the Muang Thai Cup.

BG Pathum United made their fourth final appearance, having finished as runners-up in 2018 (as Bangkok Glass) and 2023 before winning their first title in 2024. Meanwhile, Port reached their third final, having won the inaugural edition of the second era in 2010 and finished as runners-up in 2011. Despite both clubs' prior appearances in the final, this marked their first meeting in a Thai League Cup final.

In addition to the trophy, Port, as the champions, received a prize of 5 million baht and qualified for the 2026–27 ASEAN Club Championship, following their 1–0 victory over BG Pathum United.

== Route to the final ==
BG Pathum United (T1)			Round	Port (T1)		
Opponent	Result		Knockout 1 leg	Opponent	Result	
Uttaradit (T3)	4–0 (A)	Highlight	Round of 32	Chainat Hornbill (T2)	5–0 (A)	Highlight
Muangthong United (T1)	2–0 (A)	Highlight	Round of 16	Ayutthaya United (T1)	2–1 (H)	Highlight
Mahasarakham SBT (T2)	3–0 (H)	Highlight	Quarter-finals	Khon Kaen United (T2)	7–0 (H)	Highlight
Buriram United (T1)	1–0 (N)	Highlight	Semi-finals	Chonburi (T1)	4–3 (N)	Highlight

Note: In all results above, the score of the finalist is given first (H: home; A: away; T1: Clubs from Thai League 1; T2: Clubs from Thai League 2; T3: Clubs from Thai League 3.

=== BG Pathum United ===
BG Pathum United began their campaign in the round of 32 with a commanding 4–0 away victory over Uttaradit, a Thai League 3 side. Matheus Fornazari Custódio opened the scoring with a penalty before adding a second, while Surachat Sareepim and Pongrawit Jantawong completed the rout late on. In the round of 16, BG Pathum United faced a tougher test away to Muangthong United of the Thai League 1, where Ikhsan Fandi scored twice in the first half to secure a 2–0 win. They continued their strong run in the quarter-finals with a 3–0 home victory over Mahasarakham SBT, a Thai League 2 side, with Fandi netting twice and Yoshiaki Takagi adding another. In the semi-finals, BG Pathum United overcame Buriram United of the Thai League 1 at a neutral venue, with Surachat Sareepim scoring the decisive goal in a 1–0 victory, sending the club into the final.

=== Port ===
Port began their campaign with an emphatic 5–0 away win over Chainat Hornbill of the Thai League 2, with five different players on the scoresheet, including Suphanan Bureerat, Teerasak Poeiphimai, Lucas Tocantins, Brayan Perea, and Sivakorn Tiatrakul. In the round of 16, they defeated Ayutthaya United of the Thai League 1 with a 2–1 home victory, courtesy of goals from Perea and Matheus Guilherme Lins de Almeida. Port then produced one of the most dominant performances of the tournament in the quarter-finals, thrashing Khon Kaen United of the Thai League 2 7–0 at home. Teerasak Poeiphimai scored four goals, while Worachit Kanitsribampen netted twice and Peeradol Chamrasamee added another. In the semi-finals, Port faced Chonburi of the Thai League 1 at a neutral venue in a high-scoring encounter. Goals from Chaiyawat Buran, Matheus Guilherme Lins de Almeida, and a brace from Brayan Perea secured a 4–3 victory, sending Port through to the final.

== Match ==
=== Details ===
24 May 2026
19:00 UTC+7

BG Pathum United	0–1	Port
	Report; Highlight; Ceremony	Lucas Tocantins 29'

Thammasat Stadium,
Khlong Luang, Pathum Thani
Attendance: 16,807
Referee: Torphong Somsing (Thailand)

BG Pathum United	Port

Lineups:
GK	28	(Thailand) Saranon Anuin
RB	81	(Thailand) Waris Choolthong
CB	44	(Thailand) Elias Dolah		(substituted off) 60'
CB	16	(Georgia (country)) Nika Sandokhadze
LB	2	(Thailand) Sanchai Nontasila		(substituted off) 68'
DM	6	(Thailand) Sarach Yooyen (c)
CM	17	(Japan) Gakuto Notsuda	(yellow card) 54'	(substituted off) 73'
CM	5	(Thailand) Kritsada Kaman
RF	15	(Japan) Riku Matsuda		(substituted off) 46'
CF	14	(Japan) Tomoyuki Doi
LF	31	(Japan) Yoshiaki Takagi		(substituted off) 46'
Substitutes:
GK	93	(Thailand) Pisan Dorkmaikaew
DF	22	(Thailand) Nathan James
DF	24	(Thailand) Thanawat Pimyotha
DF	29	(Thailand) Warinthon Jamnongwat		(substituted on) 68'
DF	33	(Laos) Phoutthavong Sangvilay
DF	89	(Thailand) Chanapach Buaphan		(substituted on) 60'
MF	8	(Thailand) Ekanit Panya
MF	27	(Thailand) Pongrawit Jantawong
MF	30	(Thailand) Itthimon Tippanet
FW	9	(Thailand) Surachat Sareepim		(substituted on) 46'
FW	11	(Thailand) Patrik Gustavsson		(substituted on) 46'
FW	95	(Brazil) Matheus Fornazari Custódio		(substituted on) 73'
Head Coach:
(Serbia) Vladimir Vujović

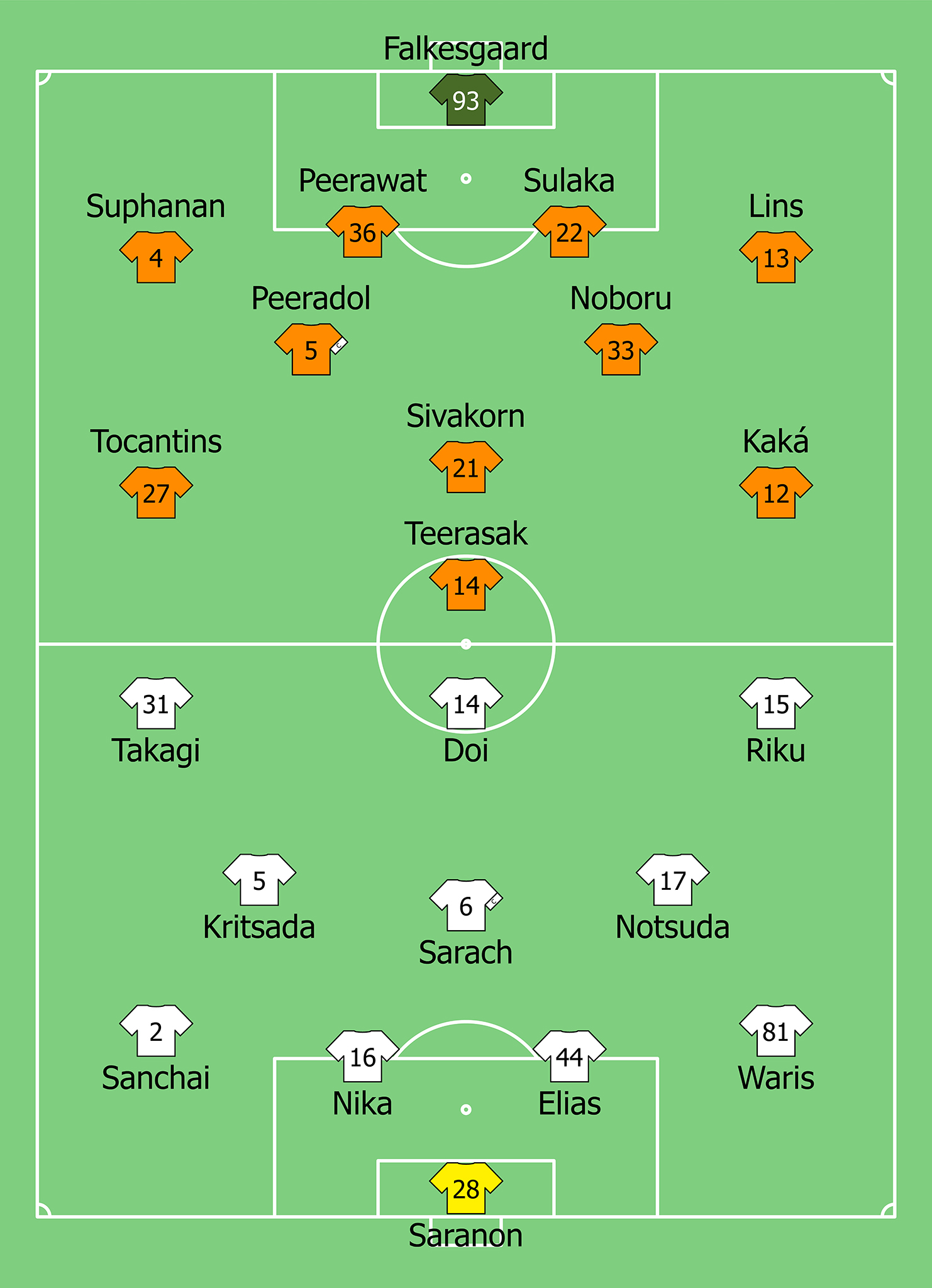

Lineups:
GK	93	(Philippines) Michael Falkesgaard
RB	4	(Thailand) Suphanan Bureerat
CB	36	(Thailand) Peerawat Akkratum
CB	22	(Iraq) Rebin Sulaka		(yellow card) 90+6'
LB	13	(Brazil) Matheus Guilherme Lins de Almeida		(yellow card) 85'
DM	5	(Thailand) Peeradol Chamrasamee (c)		(yellow card) 45'
DM	33	(Japan) Noboru Shimura			(substituted off) 81'
RM	27	(Brazil) Lucas Tocantins	29'		(substituted off) 84'
AM	21	(Thailand) Sivakorn Tiatrakul		(yellow card) 51'	(substituted off) 59'
LM	12	(Brazil) Kaká Mendes			(substituted off) 81'
CF	14	(Thailand) Teerasak Poeiphimai			(substituted off) 81'
Substitutes:
GK	1	(Thailand) Somporn Yos
DF	8	(Thailand) Tanaboon Kesarat			(substituted on) 81'
DF	16	(Thailand) Chinnawat Wongchai
DF	17	(Singapore) Irfan Fandi
DF	23	(Thailand) Hugo Boutsingkham
DF	26	(Thailand) Chaiyawat Buran			(substituted on) 84'
MF	6	(Thailand) Chanukun Karin
MF	9	(Thailand) Athit Berg
MF	10	(Thailand) Bordin Phala			(substituted on) 81'
MF	44	(Thailand) Worachit Kanitsribampen			(substituted on) 59'
FW	7	(Brazil) Leonardo Kalil
FW	18	(Colombia) Brayan Perea		(yellow card) 82'	(substituted on) 81'
Head Coach:
(Thailand) Sarawut Treephan

Assistant referees:
(Thailand) Tanate Chuchuen
(Thailand) Komsan Kampan
Fourth official:
(Thailand) Panumas Phansamo
Assistant VAR:
(Thailand) Mongkolchai Pechsri
(Thailand) Akom Charoensuk
Match Commissioner:
(Thailand) Danai Mongkolsiri
Referee Assessor:
(Thailand) Preecha Kangram

MATCH RULES

- 90 minutes.
- 30 minutes extra-time if necessary.
- Penalty shoot-out if still necessary.
- Maximum of 5 substitutions.

=== Statistics ===
First half
Statistic	BG Pathum United	Port
Goals scored	0	1
Total shots	2	8
Shots on target	1	7
Saves	6	1
Ball possession	52%	48%
Total passes	225	208
Corner kicks	2	3
Offsides	0	0
Yellow cards	0	1
Red cards	0	0

Second half
Statistic	BG Pathum United	Port
Goals scored	0	0
Total shots	4	3
Shots on target	1	2
Saves	2	1
Ball possession	56%	44%
Total passes	156	125
Corner kicks	4	3
Offsides	0	3
Yellow cards	1	4
Red cards	0	0

Overall
Statistic	BG Pathum United	Port
Goals scored	0	1
Total shots	6	11
Shots on target	2	9
Saves	8	2
Ball possession	54%	46%
Total passes	381	333
Corner kicks	6	6
Offsides	0	3
Yellow cards	1	5
Red cards	0	0

== Winner ==
2025–26 Thai League Cup
Winners
Port
Second Title

=== Prizes for winner ===
- A champion trophy.
- 5,000,000 THB prize money.
- Qualification to 2026–27 ASEAN Club Championship Group stage.

=== Prizes for runners-up ===
- 1,000,000 THB prize money.

== See also ==
- 2025–26 Thai League 1
- 2025–26 Thai League 2
- 2025–26 Thai League 3
- 2026 Thailand Semi-pro League
- 2025 Thai U21 League
- 2025–26 Thai FA Cup
- 2025–26 Thai League Cup
- 2025–26 Thai League 3 Cup
