= 2023 Thai League Cup final =

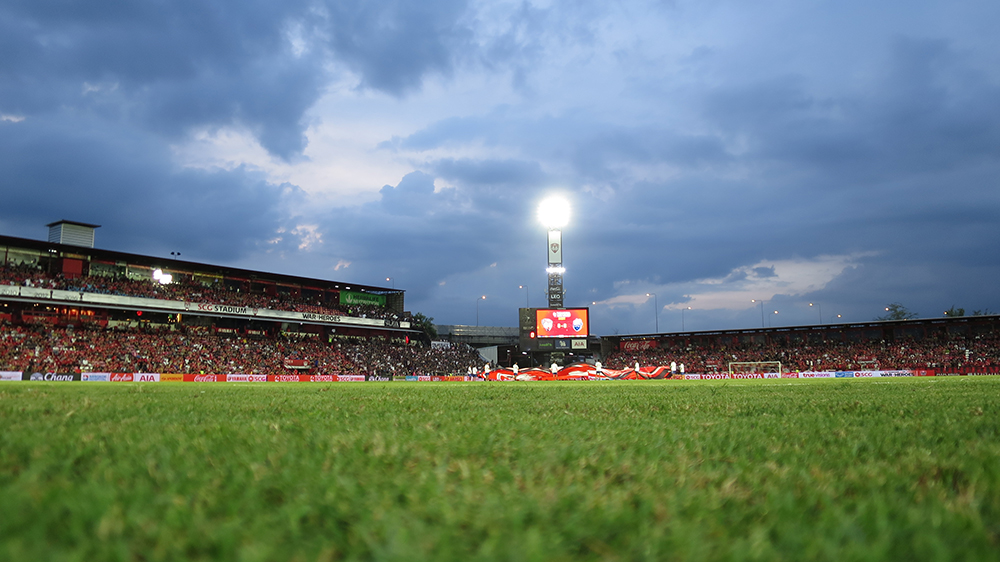
- The match took place at Thunderdome Stadium.
- Event: 2022–23 Thai League Cup
Buriram United	BG Pathum United
2	0
- Date: 20 May 2023
- Venue: Thunderdome Stadium, Pak Kret, Nonthaburi
- Man of the Match: Goran Čaušić (Buriram United)
- Referee: Chaireag Ngam-som (Thailand)
- Attendance: 10,487
- Weather: Fair; 34 °C (93 °F) humidity 49%

The 2023 Thai League Cup final was the final match of the 2022–23 Thai League Cup, the 13th season in the second era of a Thailand's football tournament organized by Football Association of Thailand. It was played at the Thunderdome Stadium in Nonthaburi, Thailand on 20 May 2023, between Buriram United a big team from Buriram that located in the Northeastern part and BG Pathum United a big team from Pathum Thani that located in the Bangkok Metropolitan Region of Thailand.

== Route to the final ==
Buriram United (T1)			Round	BG Pathum United (T1)		
Opponent	Result		Knockout 1 leg	Opponent	Result	
MH Nakhon Si City (T3)	2–0 (A)	Highlight	Round of 32	Udon Thani (T2)	3–1 (A)	Highlight
Muangthong United (T1)	2–1 (A)	Highlight	Round of 16	Nakhon Pathom United (T2)	3–2 (A)	Highlight
Bangkok United (T1)	3–0 (A)	Highlight	Quarter-finals	Chiangmai (T2)	3–0 (A)	Highlight
PT Prachuap (T1)	2–0 (N)	Highlight	Semi-finals	Ratchaburi (T1)	2–1 (N)	Highlight

Note: In all results below, the score of the finalist is given first (H: home; A: away; T1: Clubs from Thai League 1; T2: Clubs from Thai League 2; T3: Clubs from Thai League 3.

== Match ==
=== Details ===
20 May 2023
18:00 UTC+7

Buriram United	2–0	BG Pathum United
Goran Čaušić 13'; Supachai Chaided 90+3'	Report; Highlight; Full match Ceremony

Thunderdome Stadium,
Pak Kret, Nonthaburi
Attendance: 10,487
Referee: Chaireag Ngam-som (Thailand)

Buriram United	BG Pathum United

Lineups:
GK	1	(Thailand) Siwarak Tedsungnoen (c)
RB	8	(Thailand) Ratthanakorn Maikami			(substituted off) 81'
CB	11	(Malaysia) Dion Cools
CB	3	(Thailand) Pansa Hemviboon
LB	5	(Thailand) Theerathon Bunmathan
DM	6	(Thailand) Peeradon Chamratsamee
DM	20	(Serbia) Goran Čaušić	13'
RM	21	(Thailand) Suphanat Mueanta
AM	9	(Thailand) Supachai Chaided	90+3'	(yellow card) 19'
LM	2	(Thailand) Sasalak Haiprakhon			(substituted off) 66'
CF	26	(Guinea) Lonsana Doumbouya
Substitutes:
GK	59	(Thailand) Nopphon Lakhonphon
DF	14	(Thailand) Chitipat Tanklang
DF	15	(Thailand) Narubadin Weerawatnodom			(substituted on) 81'
DF	92	(Thailand) Thawatchai Inprakhon
MF	62	(Thailand) Airfan Doloh
MF	95	(Thailand) Seksan Ratree
FW	29	(Thailand) Arthit Boodjinda
FW	58	(Thailand) Pattara Soimalai
FW	99	(Democratic Republic of the Congo) Jonathan Bolingi			(substituted on) 66'
Head Coach:
(Japan) Masatada Ishii

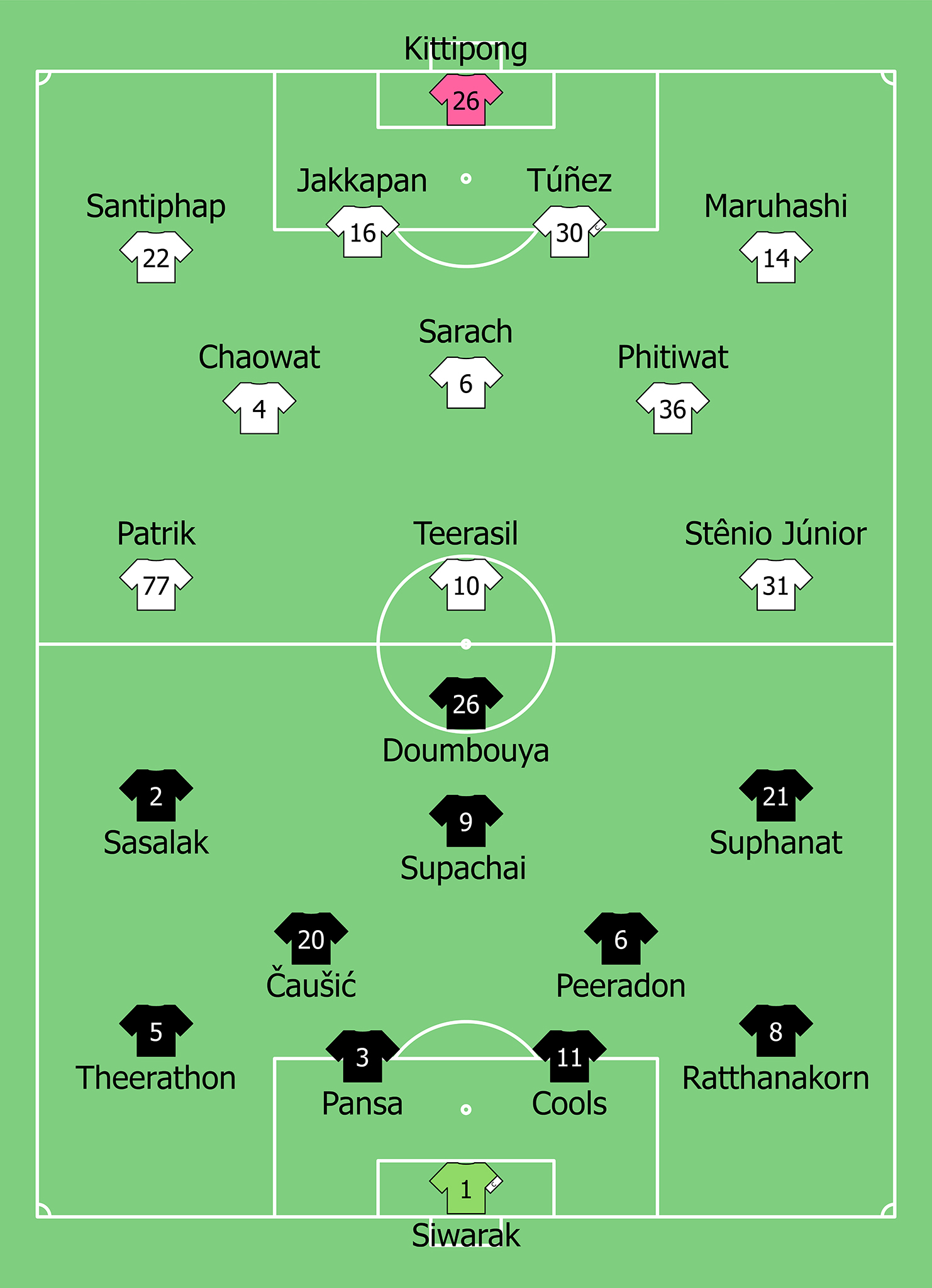

Lineups:
GK	26	(Thailand) Kittipong Phuthawchueak
RB	22	(Thailand) Santiphap Channgom	(yellow card) 79'
CB	16	(Thailand) Jakkapan Praisuwan		(substituted off) 69'
CB	30	(Venezuela) Andrés Túñez (c)
LB	14	(Japan) Yusuke Maruhashi
CM	4	(Thailand) Chaowat Veerachat	(yellow card) 69'
DM	6	(Thailand) Sarach Yooyen
CM	36	(Thailand) Phitiwat Sukjitthammakul
RF	77	(Thailand) Patrik Gustavsson		(substituted off) 64'
CF	10	(Thailand) Teerasil Dangda
LF	31	(Brazil) Stênio Júnior		(substituted off) 78'
Substitutes:
GK	39	(Thailand) Prasit Padungchok
DF	13	(Thailand) Ernesto Phumipha
DF	15	(Thailand) Apisit Sorada
DF	17	(Singapore) Irfan Fandi	(yellow card) 86'	(substituted on) 69'
DF	33	(Thailand) Wattanakorn Sawatlakhorn
DF	41	(Brazil) Cássio Scheid
FW	9	(Thailand) Surachat Sareepim		(substituted on) 64'
FW	29	(Thailand) Chatree Chimtalay
FW	98	(Thailand) Korawich Tasa		(substituted on) 78'
Head Coach:
(Thailand) Thongchai Sukkoki

Assistant referees:
(Thailand) Komsan Kampan
(Thailand) Worapong Prasartsri
Fourth official:
(Thailand) Warintron Sassadee
Assistant VAR:
(Thailand) Torphong Somsing
(Thailand) Apichit Nophuan
Match Commissioner:
(Thailand) Paiboon Unyapo
Referee Assessor:
(Thailand) Preecha Kangram
General Coordinator:
(Thailand) Narubet Kietprasert

MATCH RULES

- 90 minutes.
- 30 minutes extra-time if necessary.
- Penalty shoot-out if still necessary.
- Maximum of 5 substitutions.

=== Statistics ===
First half
Statistic	Buriram United	BG Pathum United
Goals scored	1	0
Total shots	9	6
Shots on target	2	2
Saves	2	1
Ball possession	47%	53%
Total passes	178	217
Corner kicks	2	2
Fouls committed	5	9
Offsides	0	1
Yellow cards	1	0
Red cards	0	0

Second half
Statistic	Buriram United	BG Pathum United
Goals scored	1	0
Total shots	5	5
Shots on target	1	1
Saves	1	0
Ball possession	41%	59%
Total passes	150	238
Corner kicks	3	2
Fouls committed	7	11
Offsides	0	0
Yellow cards	0	3
Red cards	0	0

Overall
Statistic	Buriram United	BG Pathum United
Goals scored	2	0
Total shots	14	11
Shots on target	3	3
Saves	3	1
Ball possession	44%	56%
Total passes	328	455
Corner kicks	5	4
Fouls committed	12	20
Offsides	0	1
Yellow cards	1	3
Red cards	0	0

== Winner ==
2022–23 Thai League Cup
Winners
Buriram United
Seventh Title

=== Prizes for winner ===
- A champion trophy.
- 5,000,000 THB prize money.

=== Prizes for runners-up ===
- 1,000,000 THB prize money.

== See also ==
- 2022–23 Thai League 1
- 2022–23 Thai League 2
- 2022–23 Thai League 3
- 2022–23 Thai FA Cup
- 2022–23 Thai League Cup
- 2022 Thailand Champions Cup
