= Talal Nayef =

Kuwaiti footballer

Personal information
- Full name: Talal Nayef Abdullah Asheq Al Enazi (Arabic: طلال نايف عبد الله عاشق العنزي)
- Date of birth: 10 November 1985 (age 41)
- Place of birth: Kuwait City, Kuwait
- Position: Midfielder

Team information
- Current team: Al Salibikhaet
- Number: 21

Senior career*
Years	Team	Apps	(Gls)
2006–2010	Al Naser	100	(6)
2010–2011	Jedinstvo	2	(0)
2011	Al-Suwaiq	3	(0)
2011–2018	Al Arabi	140	(3)
2016–2017	→ Qatar SC (loan)	5	(0)
2019–2020	Al Salibikhaet	4	(0)

International career
2007–2015	Kuwait	46	(0)
- * Club domestic league appearances and goals as of 14:43, 18 December 2019 (UTC)

Talal Nayef (Arabic: طلال نايف; born 10 November 1985) is a Kuwaiti footballer currently playing with Al Arabi.

He formerly played for the u-19 team in Kuwait, and then selected to play for the national team.
