= Mohammad Frieh =

Kuwaiti footballer

Personal information
- Full name: Mohammad Frieh Aaidh Al-Rashidi (Arabic:محمد فريح عايض الرشيدي)
- Date of birth: January 1, 1988 (age 38)
- Place of birth: Kuwait City, Kuwait
- Position: Right back

Team information
- Current team: Kuwait SC
- Number: 14

Youth career
- 2000–2005: Al Sahel

Senior career*
Years	Team	Apps	(Gls)
2005–2010	Al Sahel	64	(2)
2010	Mirbat SC	1	(0)
2011–2022	Al Arabi	+120	(+8)
2022–	Kuwait SC		

International career^{‡}
2012–	Kuwait	17	(0)
- * Club domestic league appearances and goals as of September 26, 2019 ‡ National team caps and goals as of October 15, 2019

Mohammad Frieh (Arabic: محمد فريح; born 1 January 1988) is a Kuwaiti footballer currently playing with Kuwaiti club, Kuwait SC.

== Honours ==
Al-Kuwait

- AFC Challenge League: 2025-2026
