= Pairote Sokam =

Thai footballer (born 1987)

Personal information
- Full name: Pairote Sokam
- Date of birth: 24 August 1987 (age 39)
- Place of birth: Khon Kaen, Thailand
- Height: 1.80 m (5 ft 11 in)
- Position: Centre-back

Senior career*
Years	Team	Apps	(Gls)
2011–2014	Muangthong United	8	(0)
2012	→ Esan United (loan)	22	(0)
2013	→ Suphanburi (loan)	29	(1)
2014–2015	Police United	2	(0)
2016	Chainat Hornbill	3	(0)
2017–2018	Nongbua Pitchaya	29	(0)
2019	Trat	3	(0)
2020–2021	Khon Kaen United	15	(0)
Total		111	(1)

International career
2013–2014	Thailand	2	(0)
- * Club domestic league appearances and goals

Pairote Sokam (Thai: ไพโรจน์ โสคำ, born August 24, 1987), is a Thai retired professional footballer who plays as a centre-back.

== International career ==
In July 2013 Pairote debut for Thailand playing a friendly match against China. Later in October 2013 Pairote was called up to the national team by Surachai Jaturapattarapong to the 2015 AFC Asian Cup qualification. In October, 2013 he came in as a substitute in a friendly match against Bahrain.

=== International ===
As of 12 November 2015

National team	Year	Apps	Goals
Thailand	2013	2	0
Thailand	Total	2	0

== Honours ==
=== Club ===
Police United

- Thai Division 1 League
  - Champions (1) : 2015
