= Mongkol Namnuad =

Thai footballer (born 1985)

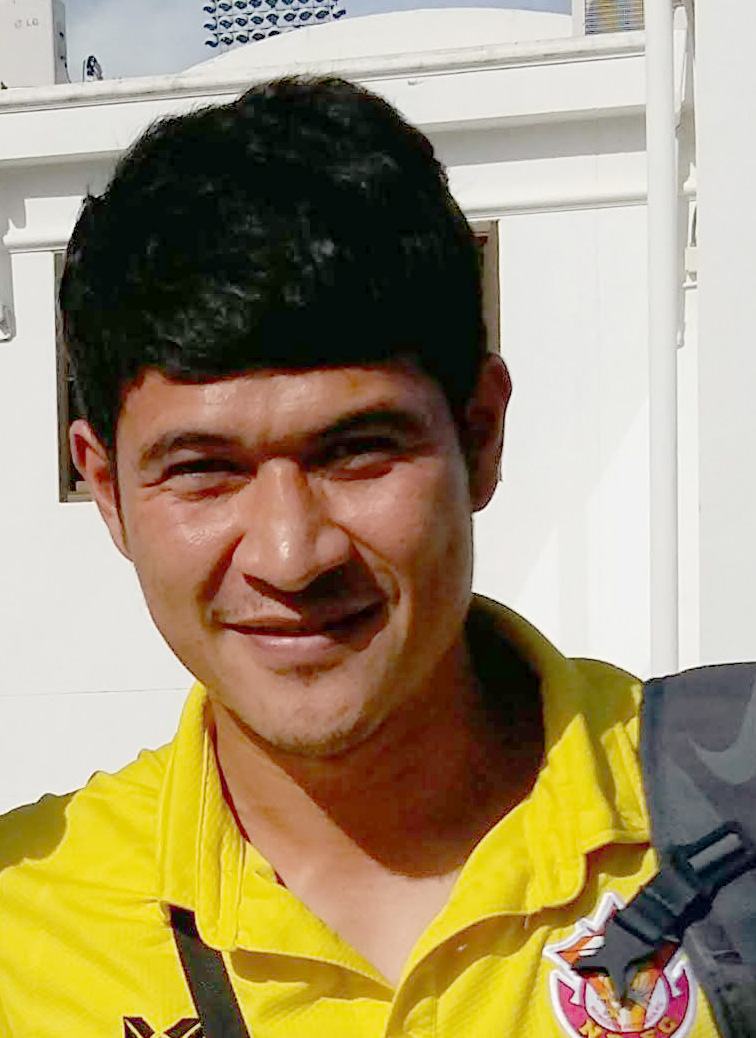
- Namnuad in 2019

Personal information
- Full name: Mongkol Namnuad
- Date of birth: 16 September 1985 (age 41)
- Place of birth: Khon Kaen, Thailand
- Height: 1.80 m (5 ft 11 in)
- Position: Left-back

Youth career
- 2005–2007: Chonburi

Senior career*
Years	Team	Apps	(Gls)
2008	Sriracha Sannibat	10	(0)
2009	Pattaya United	22	(1)
2010	Police United	4	(0)
2011	Thai Port	34	(2)
2012–2013	Muangthong United	39	(0)
2014	Ratchaburi Mitr Phol	6	(0)
2015	PTT Rayong	21	(0)
2016	Khon Kaen United	19	(0)
2017–2018	Bangkok Glass	20	(0)
2018	→ Navy (loan)	15	(1)
2019	Nongbua Pitchaya	13	(1)
2019–2020	Chonburi	10	(0)
2020	Police Tero	0	(0)
2020–2021	Ayutthaya United	16	(0)
2021–2022	Pattaya Dolphins United	16	(0)
2023	Rajpracha	6	(0)
Total		251	(5)
- * Club domestic league appearances and goals

Mongkol Namnuad (Thai: มงคล นามนวด; born 16 September 1985) is a Thai former professional footballer.

== Honours ==
=== Club ===
Muangthong United

- Thai League 1 Champions (1): 2012
