= Matt Smith (soccer, born 1982) =

Australian soccer player and manager (born 1982)

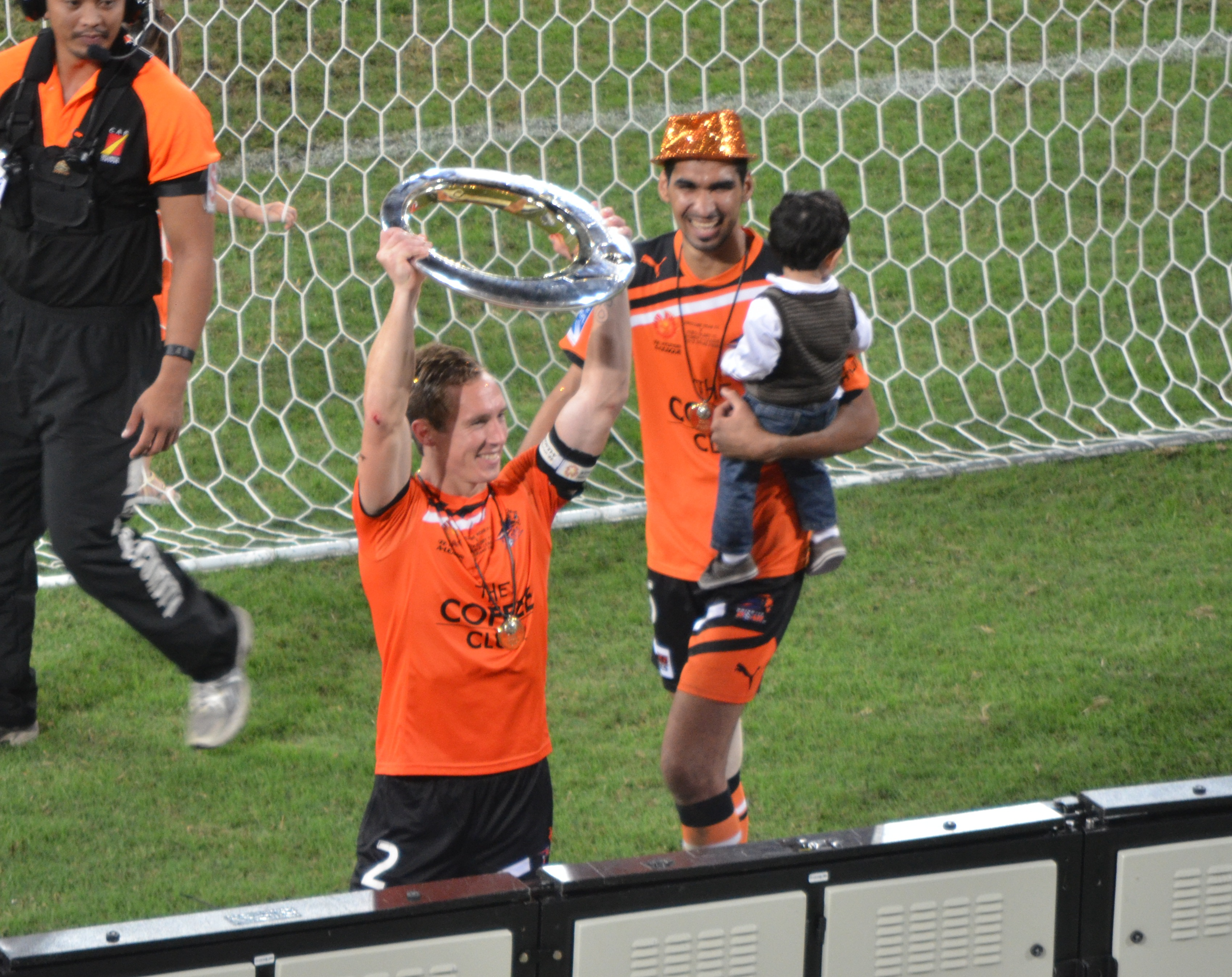
- Smith with the A-League trophy (Brisbane Roar, 2012)

Personal information
- Full name: Matthew Terence Smith
- Date of birth: 15 October 1982 (age 44)
- Place of birth: Chichester, England
- Height: 1.80 m (5 ft 11 in)
- Position: Centre back

Team information
- Current team: Malaysia (assistant)

Youth career
- UWE Hartpury Uni., Gloucestershire

Senior career*
| Years | Team | Apps | (Gls) |
| 2000–2001 | Portsmouth | 0 | (0) |
| 2005 | Chichester City United | 18 | (5) |
| 2006–2007 | Cirencester Town | 0 | (0) |
| 2007 | Gold Coast City | 25 | (2) |
| 2008–2010 | Brisbane Strikers | 24 | (3) |
| 2009–2010 | → North Qld Fury (loan) | 11 | (0) |
| 2010–2014 | Brisbane Roar | 112 | (5) |
| 2015–2018 | BG Pathum United | 120 | (7) |
| 2019 | Kitchee | 9 | (0) |
| 2019–2020 | Gold Coast Knights | 9 | (0) |
| 2020–2022 | Brisbane City | 54 | (1) |

International career
| 2012 | Australia | 3 | (0) |

Managerial career
- 2020–2022: Brisbane City
- 2022–2023: BG Pathum United
- 2025–: Malaysia (assistant)
- * Club domestic league appearances and goals as of 29 October 2022

Matthew Terence Smith (born 14 October 1982) is a soccer manager and former player, he is the currently assistant coach of Malaysia.

Born in England, Smith emigrated to Australia where he started his professional soccer career with North Queensland Fury during the 2009-10 A-League season and then signed a two-year contract with Brisbane Roar at the start of the A-League 2010–11 season. He has played for the Australian national team, and coached Brisbane City FC out of NPL Queensland in 2020, as The Azzurri were relegated into the FQPL in 2021. The Azzurri return in NPL Queensland in 2022.

== Club career ==
Born in Chichester, England, Smith started his career playing University football in England, where he represented several different Universities before being signed by Championship club Portsmouth.

Smith moved to Australia for one year in 2004 and returned in 2006, during which time he attended Hartpury College in Gloucestershire and completed his master's degree in Sports Management. He also captained the Hartpury senior side to the BUSA National Championship in 2007.

He moved to Australia and played for Palm Beach before moving to Brisbane Strikers. He was signed on an injury replacement loan at North Queensland Fury to replace Scottish defender Scott Wilson.

=== Brisbane Roar ===
On 16 April 2010 it was announced that Smith joined the Brisbane Roar on a two-year deal after his contract with North Queensland expired due to ownership changes. On 6 September 2011, the Roar announced that Smith would replace departed midfielder Matt McKay as captain of the club. On 10 September 2012, Smith signed a new 3-year contract at the Roar, extending his stay until the end of the 2015/16 season.

=== Bangkok Glass ===
It was announced in December 2014 that Smith would leave the Brisbane Roar and join Bangkok Glass for an undisclosed fee.

=== Kitchee ===
On 31 December 2018, Smith moved to Hong Kong Premier League club Kitchee.

On 12 February 2019, in the third qualifying match of the 2019 Asian Champions League, Kitchee played away to Perak. During the match, Matt Smith was sent off after picking up his second yellow card in the 49th minute. Kitchee lost the match on penalties in the end.

=== Return to Australia ===
In July 2019, National Premier Leagues Queensland side Gold Coast Knights announced the signing of Smith. After seven months with the club, Smith departed in February 2020.

In February 2020, Smith joined Brisbane City, taking on a double role as a player and football director. After three years as football director and head coach of the club, in September 2022, Smith was announced as a general manager of A-League Men club Brisbane Roar, for which he had played 112 games.

== Managerial career ==
In October 2022, Smith was appointed head coach of BG Pathum United for whom he had played for and captained. In March 2023, after not meeting the team's targets, Smith was dismissed from the head coach role at the club, but was transferred to be a technical coach instead of leaving.

In July 2023, after his stint as head coach overseas, Smith returned to Australia and joined A-League Men club Macarthur FC as the assistant coach under Mile Sterjovski. In February 2025, he departed the club to pursue an opportunity overseas.

== Personal ==
Smith married Aicha Bendjelloul, an English woman on 17 May 2012 in a civil ceremony in Brisbane, Australia. They then celebrated with family and friends by hosting a party on the Thai island of Koh Samui.

Together, they have 4 children Isla, Ava, Ruby and Owen. Smith is qualified with a BA Degree in Marketing and Leisure Management and a Masters in Sports Management from Hartpury College in Gloucestershire.

== A-League statistics ==
As of 17 December 2018

Appearances and goals by club, season and competition
| Club | Season | League^{1} | | Cup | | International^{2} | | Total | |
| Club | Season | Apps | Goals | Apps | Goals | Apps | Goals | Apps | Goals |
|---|---|---|---|---|---|---|---|---|---|
| North Queensland Fury | 2009–10 | 11 | 0 | – | – | – | – | 11 | 0 |
| Brisbane Roar | 2010–11 | 33 | 2 | – | – | – | – | 33 | 2 |
| Brisbane Roar | 2011–12 | 27 | 0 | – | – | 5 | 0 | 32 | 0 |
| Brisbane Roar | 2012–13 | 14 | 0 | – | – | 0 | 0 | 14 | 0 |
| Brisbane Roar | 2013–14 | 29 | 3 | – | – | – | – | 29 | 3 |
| Brisbane Roar | 2014–15 | 3 | 0 | 1 | 1 | 0 | 0 | 4 | 1 |
| Brisbane Roar | Total | 106 | 5 | 1 | 1 | 5 | 0 | 112 | 6 |
| Bangkok Glass | 2015 | 33 | 4 | 1 | 0 | 2 | 0 | 36 | 4 |
| Bangkok Glass | 2016 | 31 | 0 | – | – | – | – | 0 | 0 |
| Bangkok Glass | 2017 | 30 | 0 | – | – | – | – | 0 | 0 |
| Bangkok Glass | 2018 | 26 | 3 | – | – | – | – | 0 | 0 |
| Bangkok Glass | Total | 120 | 7 | 0 | 0 | 0 | 0 | 0 | 0 |
| Career total | | 237 | 12 | 1 | 1 | 5 | 0 | 243 | 12 |

^{1} - includes A-League final series statistics
^{2} - includes FIFA Club World Cup statistics; AFC Champions League statistics are included in season commencing after group stages (i.e. ACL and A-League seasons etc.)

== Managerial statistics ==
As of 19 March 2023

Managerial record by team and tenure
| Team | Nat. | From | To | Record | | | | | Ref. |
| Team | Nat. | From | To | G | W | D | L | Win % | Ref. |
|---|---|---|---|---|---|---|---|---|---|
| BG Pathum United | (Thailand) | 29 October 2022 | 19 March 2023 | 20 | 9 | 2 | 9 | 45.00 | |
| Career Total | | | | 20 | 9 | 2 | 9 | 45.00 | |

== Honours ==
=== Club ===
Brisbane Strikers

- Queensland State League Premiership: 2009

Brisbane Roar

- A-League Championship: 2010–11, 2011–12, 2013–14
- A-League Premiership: 2010–11, 2013–14

Kitchee

- Hong Kong Senior Shield: 2018–19
- Hong Kong FA Cup: 2018–19

Gold Coast Knights

- NPL Queensland Championship: 2019

==== Brisbane City ====
- Football Queensland Premier League Premiership: 2021
- Football Queensland Premier League Championship: 2021

=== Manager ===
==== Brisbane City ====
- Football Queensland Premier League Premiership: 2021
- Football Queensland Premier League Championship: 2021

=== Individual ===
- PFA A-League Team of the Season: 2010–11, 2013–14
- Football Queensland Premier League Team of the Season: 2021
- Football Queensland Premier League Coach of the Year: 2021
- A-League All Star: 2014
