= David Bala (footballer) =

Brazilian footballer (born 1988)

Personal information
- Full name: David Carlos Teles Veloso
- Date of birth: 28 October 1988 (age 38)
- Place of birth: Vera Cruz, São Paulo, Brazil
- Height: 1.85 m (6 ft 1 in)
- Position: Forward

Team information
- Current team: WSE
- Number: 10

Senior career*
Years	Team	Apps	(Gls)
2008	América-RJ		
2008	Americano		
2009	Itaperuna		
2009	Ipitanga Bahia		
2010	Ipatinga		
2011	Interclube		
2011	Bình Dương	12	(2)
2013	Conquista-BA	0	(0)
2014	Sisaket	15	(0)
2015	Samutsongkhram	10	(2)
2017	Lampang	24	(18)
2017–2018	Khon Kaen	17	(6)
2018	→ BG Pathum United (loan)	15	(8)
2019	Chiangmai	3	(0)
2019	Kalteng Putra	2	(1)
2022	Rangers (HKG)	1	(0)
2022–2025	Central & Western	52	(61)
2025–	WSE	26	(45)
- * Club domestic league appearances and goals as of 17 May 2026

David Carlos Teles Veloso (born October 28, 1988), simply known as David Bala, is a Brazilian professional footballer who currently plays as a forward for Hong Kong First Division League club WSE.
