= Thai League Cup =

- Organiser(s): Football Association of Thailand
- Founded: 1987; 39 years ago (1st era); 2010; 16 years ago (2nd era)
- Region: Thailand
- Teams: 92
- Qualifier for: ASEAN Club Championship
- Current champions: Port (2nd title)
- Most championships: Buriram United (8 titles)
- Broadcaster: TrueVisions
- 2026–27 Thai League Cup

The League Cup (Thai: ไทยลีกคัพ) is a football cup competition in Thailand. It is also known as Muang Thai Cup for sponsorship reasons.

== History ==
Thai League Cup was started by Toyota Motor (Thailand) in the name of Toyota Cup, the competition was held eight times between 1987 and 1994. Toyota Cup was canceled after establishing the 1996–97 Thailand Soccer League in the form of a professional league. As a result, the importance of the League Cup was diminished and the reason for its eventual cancellation.

It was re-formed during the 2010 domestic football league season in Thailand and ran along the same lines as the Thai FA Cup except that the earlier rounds would be regional rather than an open draw.

The League Cup competition in Thailand is said to be an opportunity for medium-sized teams to have the opportunity to compete with big teams and win prize money. The winning prize will receive a prize of 5,000,000 baht. The runner-up receives a prize of 1,000,000 baht and a travel allowance for all visiting teams from the qualifying round to the final rounds, 50,000 baht per team.

== Format ==
Thai League Cup is open to all members of the Football Association of Thailand and Thai League 1 and is divided into eight rounds; the remaining Thai League teams enter the first round. Matches in all rounds are single-legged, except for the semi-finals, which have been two-legged since the competition began. In the single-legged top division, teams will play as away teams. The semi-finals were the exception to this when the away goals rule and penalties were introduced.

For final match that has finished level after extra time has been decided by a penalty shoot-out. The winner also qualifies for Mekong Club Championship until 2017 but from season 2020 the winner will qualify for ASEAN Club Championship.

== Final ==
=== Toyota Cup ===
Year	Winner
1987	Royal Thai Air Force
1988	Bangkok Bank
1989	Royal Thai Police
1990	Bangkok (Osotsapa + Royal Thai Navy)
1991	Royal Thai Police
1992	Krung Thai Bank
1993	Royal Thai Police
1994	Royal Thai Air Force

=== League Cup ===
Year	Winner	Score	Runners-up	Venue
2010	Port	2–1	Buriram PEA	Supachalasai Stadium
2011	Buriram PEA	2–0	Port	Supachalasai Stadium
2012	Buriram United (2)	4–1	Ratchaburi	Thammasat Stadium
2013	Buriram United (3)	2–1	Ratchaburi	Thammasat Stadium
2014	BEC Tero Sasana	2–0	Buriram United	Supachalasai Stadium
2015	Buriram United (4)	1–0	Sisaket	Supachalasai Stadium
2016	Buriram United (5) and Muangthong United			
2017	Muangthong United (2)	2–0	Chiangrai United	Supachalasai Stadium
2018	Chiangrai United	1–0	Bangkok Glass	Thammasat Stadium
2019	PT Prachuap	1–1 (a.e.t.) (8–7 p)	Buriram United	SCG Stadium
2020	Cancelled			
2021–22	Buriram United (6)	4–0	PT Prachuap	BG Stadium
2022–23	Buriram United (7)	2–0	BG Pathum United	Thunderdome Stadium
2023–24	BG Pathum United	1–0	Muangthong United	Thammasat Stadium
2024–25	Buriram United (8)	2–0	Lamphun Warriors	BG Stadium
2025–26	Port (2)	1–0	BG Pathum United	Thammasat Stadium
2026–27				

== Sponsorship ==
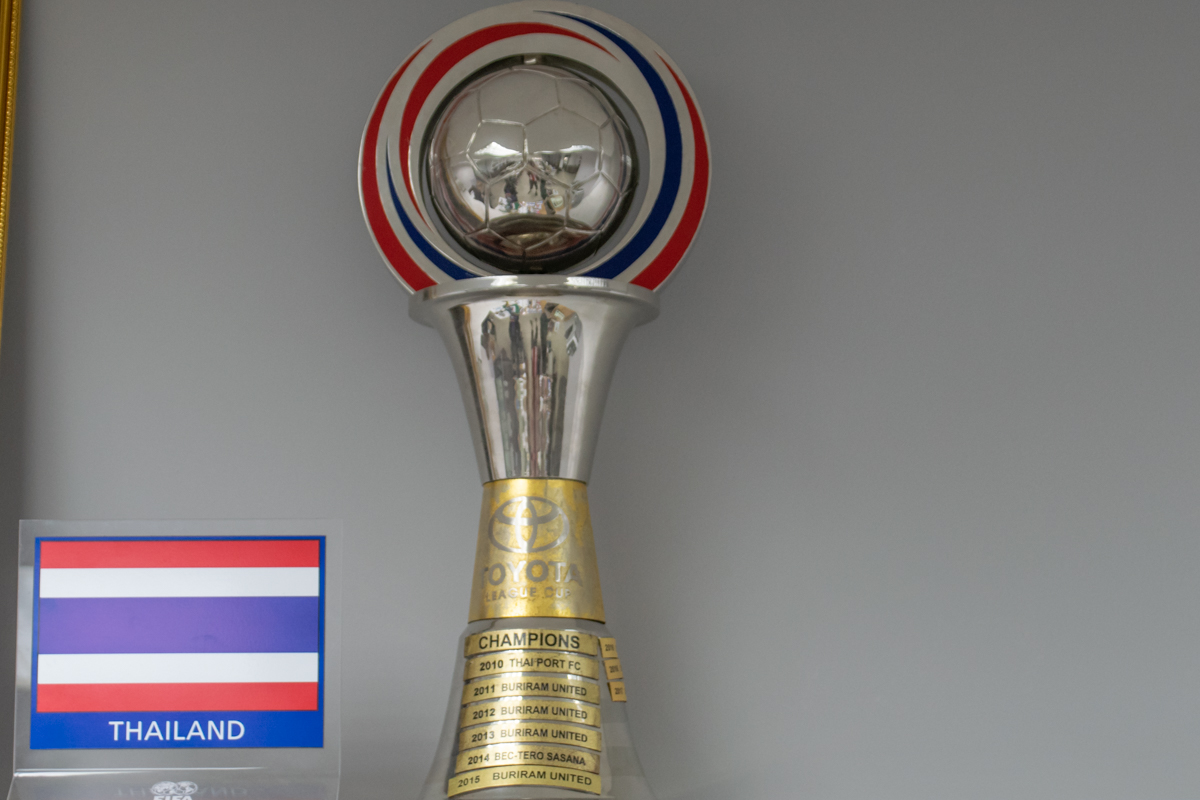
League Cup Trophy

From 2010 to the present, the League Cup has attracted title sponsorship, the League Cup was named after its sponsor, giving it the following names:

Period	Sponsor	Name	Trophy
2010 to 2020	Toyota	Toyota League Cup	Sponsor designed
2021	Hilux Revo	Hilux Revo League Cup	Sponsor designed
2022 to 2024	Hilux Revo	Hilux Revo Cup	Sponsor designed
2024–25	Hilux Revo	Revo Cup	Sponsor designed
2025–26 to present	Muang Thai Life Assurance	Muang Thai Cup	Sponsor designed
