= Romain Gasmi =

French footballer (born 1987)

Personal information
- Full name: Romain Gasmi
- Date of birth: 15 February 1987 (age 39)
- Place of birth: Lyon, France
- Height: 1.73 m (5 ft 8 in)
- Positions: Forward; attacking midfielder

Youth career
- 2000–2002: ASOA Valence

Senior career*
Years	Team	Apps	(Gls)
2003–2004	ASOA Valence	20	(4)
2004–2010	Strasbourg B	84	(17)
2004–2008	RC Strasbourg	15	(1)
2008–2009	→ Southampton (loan)	4	(0)
2010–2011	Monts d'Or Azergues	5	(3)
2011–2015	Bangkok United	117	(44)
2016	Chiangmai	13	(4)
2016	Bangkok Glass	13	(4)
2017	BBCU	9	(0)
2017	Khon Kaen	24	(6)
2018–	SR Colmar	0	(0)
- * Club domestic league appearances and goals as of 23:57, 12 April 2020 (UTC)

Romain Gasmi (born 15 February 1987) is a French footballer.

== Career ==
On 1 September 2008, Gasmi joined Southampton on a season long loan, with a view to a permanent deal. He went on to make his debut coming on as substitute for David McGoldrick in the goalless home draw against Plymouth Argyle on 25 November.
