= Ongart Pamonprasert =

Thai footballer (born 1994)

Personal information
- Full name: Ongart Pamonprasert
- Date of birth: 12 June 1994 (age 32)
- Place of birth: Ubon Ratchathani, Thailand
- Height: 1.73 m (5 ft 8 in)
- Position: Midfielder

Youth career
- 2009–2011: Bangkok Glass

Senior career*
Years	Team	Apps	(Gls)
2012–2016	Bangkok Glass	21	(0)
2017–2018	Army United	2	(0)

International career
2010	Thailand U19		
- * Club domestic league appearances and goals

Ongart Pamonprasert (Thai: องอาจ ภมรประเสริฐ, born June 12, 1994) simply known as Dom (Thai: โดม), is a Thai former professional footballer who played as a midfielder.

== Honours ==
=== Clubs ===
Bangkok Glass

- Thai FA Cup (1): 2014
