= Wanlop Saechio =

Thai footballer

Wanlop Sae-chew
Personal information
- Full name: Wanlop Sae-chew
- Date of birth: October 20, 1986 (age 40)
- Place of birth: Krabi, Thailand
- Height: 1.85 m (6 ft 1 in)
- Position: Goalkeeper

Senior career*
Years	Team	Apps	(Gls)
2009–2012	Thai Port	33	(0)
2013–2014	Police United	31	(0)
2015	Chainat Hornbill	20	(0)
2016–2017	Bangkok Glass	8	(0)
2017	PT Prachuap	5	(0)
2018	Navy	5	(0)
2018	Chiangrai United	2	(0)
2019–2020	Sukhothai	0	(0)
- * Club domestic league appearances and goals as of 7 May 2016

Wanlop Sae-chew (Thai: : วัลลภ แซ่จิ๋ว, born October 20, 1986), simply known as Rong (Thai: รอง), is a Thai professional footballer who plays as a goalkeeper.

== Honours ==
=== Club ===
Thai Port

- Thai FA Cup (1): 2009
- Thai League Cup (1): 2010

Chiangrai United

- Thai League Cup (1): 2018
- Thai FA Cup (1): 2018
