= Torsak Sa-ardeiem =

Thai footballer (born 1997)

Personal information
- Full name: Torsak Sa-ardeiem
- Date of birth: 30 June 1997 (age 29)
- Place of birth: Bangkok, Thailand
- Height: 1.74 m (5 ft 8 1/2 in)
- Positions: Centre back; right back

Team information
- Current team: Phichit United
- Number: 44

Youth career
- 2009–2014: Bangkok Glass

Senior career*
Years	Team	Apps	(Gls)
2016–2017	Bangkok Glass	1	(0)
2016	→ Rangsit (loan)	8	(0)
2017	→ Chiangmai (loan)	16	(0)
2018–2019	Chiangmai	9	(0)
2019	→ JL Chiangmai United (loan)	12	(0)
2020	Lamphun Warrior	19	(0)
2021–2024	Chiangmai United	36	(0)
2024	Navy	0	(0)
2026–	Phichit United	9	(0)

International career
2016	Thailand U19	2	(0)
- * Club domestic league appearances and goals as of 22 March 2026

Torsak Sa-ardeiem (Thai: ต่อศักดิ์ สะอาดเอี่ยม, born August 23, 1997) is a Thai professional footballer who plays as a centre back or right back for Thai League 3 club Phichit United.

== Honour ==
Lamphun Warrior

- Thai League 3 (1): 2020-2021
