= Pichit Ketsro =

Thai footballer (born 1987)

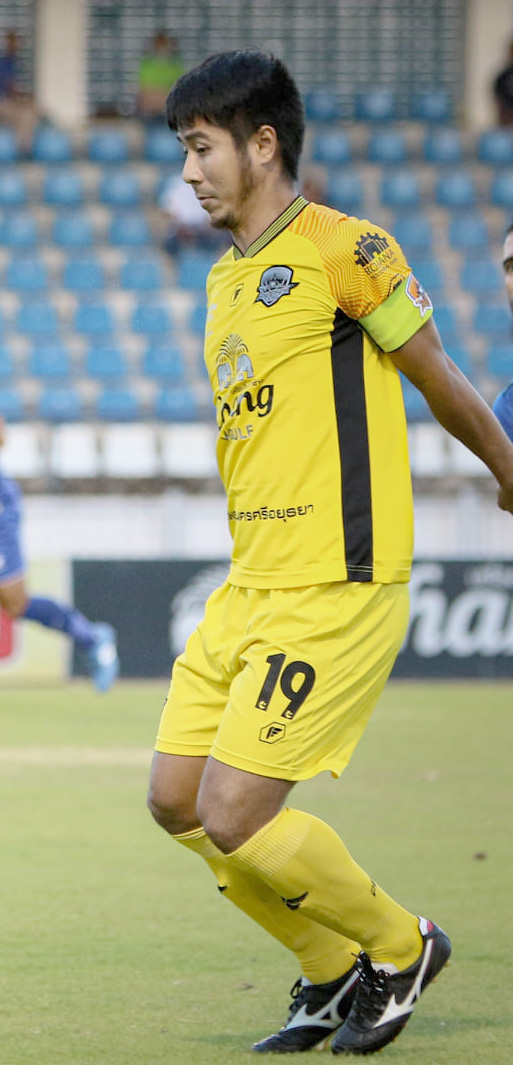

Personal information
- Full name: Pichit Ketsro
- Date of birth: 15 March 1987 (age 39)
- Place of birth: Chantaburi, Thailand
- Height: 1.70 m (5 ft 7 in)
- Positions: Right back; defensive midfielder

Team information
- Current team: Kasetsart
- Number: 19

Senior career*
Years	Team	Apps	(Gls)
2007–2008	Bangkok Bank		
2009–2010	Pattaya United		
2010	Rajpracha		
2011–2013	TOT	21	(0)
2014	Songkhla United	18	(1)
2015	Army United	28	(0)
2016–2019	BG Pathum United	53	(1)
2019–2020	Nakhon Ratchasima	4	(0)
2020	Samut Sakhon		
2021	Ayutthaya United	29	(0)
2021–2022	Sisaket	29	(1)
2022–2023	Ayutthaya United	19	(0)
2024–	Kasetsart	29	(0)
- * Club domestic league appearances and goals as of 26 April 2025

Pichit Ketsro (Thai: พิชิต เกสโร, born March 15, 1987) is a Thai professional footballer who plays as a right back for Kasetsart in the Thai League 2.
