= Peerapong Pichitchotirat =

Thai footballer (born 1984)

Personal information
- Full name: Peerapong Pichitchotirat
- Date of birth: 28 June 1984 (age 42)
- Place of birth: Ratchaburi, Thailand
- Height: 1.72 m (5 ft 7 1/2 in)
- Position: Midfielder

Team information
- Current team: BG Pathum United U21 (match analyst); BG Pathum United (head coach)

Youth career
- 1994–2001: King's College
- 2001–2002: Nakhon Pathom
- 2003–2006: Mahidol University

Senior career*
Years	Team	Apps	(Gls)
2007–2018	Bangkok Glass	229	(23)
2014	→ Chiangrai United (loan)	19	(1)
2019	Chiangrai United	20	(0)
2020–2021	BG Pathum United	7	(0)
2021	Rajpracha	0	(0)
2021–2022	BG Pathum United	6	(1)
Total		281	(25)

Managerial career
- 2022–2025: BG Pathum United (assistant)
- 2025–2026: Chiangrai United (assistant)
- 2026–: BG Pathum U21 (match analyst)
- 2026: BG Pathum United (interim)
- 2026–: BG Pathum United
- * Club domestic league appearances and goals

Peerapong Pichitchotirat (Thai: พีรพงศ์ พิชิตโชติรัตน์, born June 28, 1984) is a Thai retired footballer who plays as a midfielder. He is currently the head coach of the Thai League 1 club, BG Pathum United.

== Club career ==
He played for Krung Thai Bank in the 2008 AFC Champions League group stage.

== Managerial statistics ==
As of match played 8 November 2026

Managerial record by team and tenure
Team	Nat.	From	To	Record								Ref.
Team	Nat.	From	To	G	W	D	L	GF	GA	GD	Win %	Ref.
BG Pathum United	(Thailand)	16 October 2026	Present	7	4	1	2	13	4	+9	57.14	
Career Total				7	4	1	2	13	4	+9	57.14	

== Honours ==
=== Clubs ===
Bangkok Glass/BG Pathum United

- Thai League 1 (1): 2020–21
- Thai FA Cup (1): 2014
- Queen's Cup (1): 2010
- Singapore Cup (1): 2010

Chiangrai United

- Thai League 1 (1): 2019
