= Piyachanok Darit =

Thai footballer (born 1992)

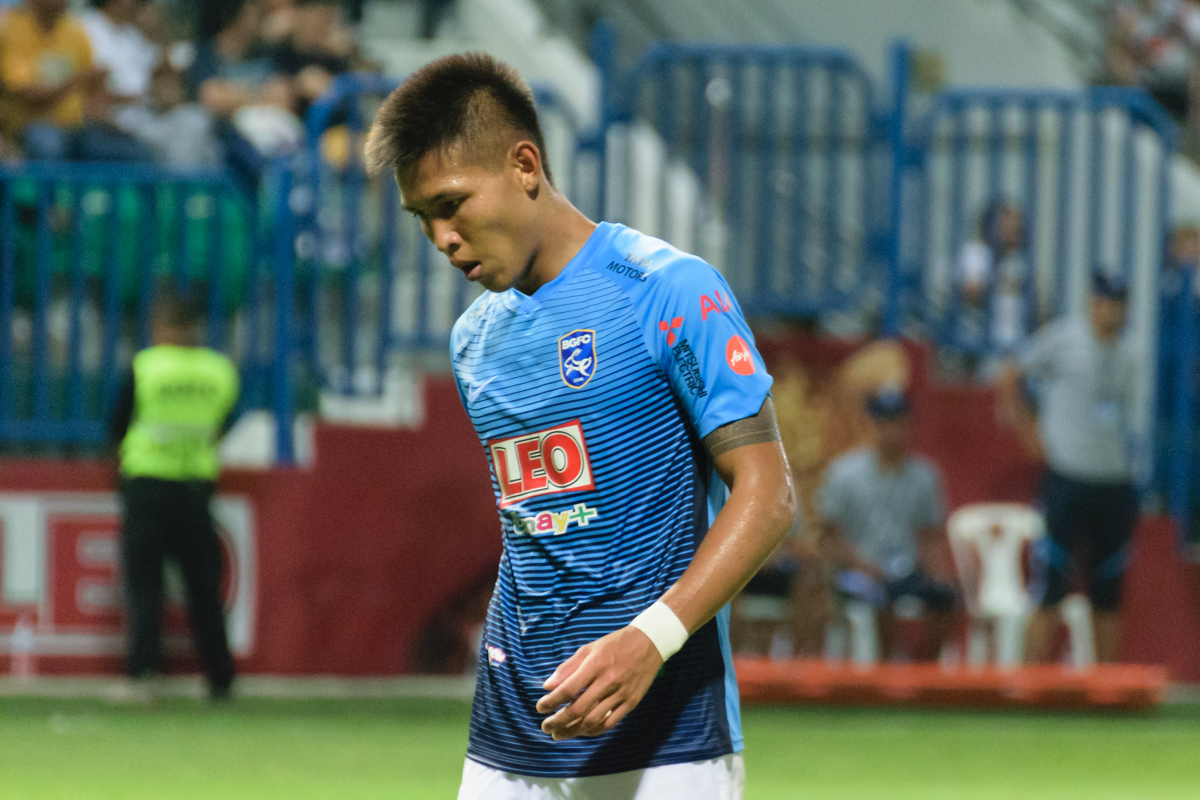

Personal information
- Full name: Piyachanok Darit
- Date of birth: 5 November 1992 (age 34)
- Place of birth: Sakon Nakhon, Thailand
- Height: 1.91 m (6 ft 3 in)
- Position: Centre back

Team information
- Current team: Roi Et PB United
- Number: 3

Youth career
- 2008–2010: Sarawittaya School
- 2010–2011: Bangkok Glass

Senior career*
Years	Team	Apps	(Gls)
2011–2023	BG Pathum United	89	(3)
2011–2014	→ Rangsit (loan)	46	(7)
2019	→ Port (loan)	1	(0)
2020	→ Khon Kaen (loan)	0	(0)
2020	→ Rajpracha (loan)	0	(0)
2020–2021	→ Suphanburi (loan)	4	(0)
2021–2022	→ Suphanburi (loan)	11	(0)
2022–2023	→ Chiangmai (loan)	21	(0)
2023–2024	Chiangmai	30	(0)
2024–2025	Mahasarakham SBT	24	(1)
2025–	Roi Et PB United	0	(0)
- * Club domestic league appearances and goals as of 5 November 2024

Piyachanok Darit (Thai: ปิยะชนก ดาฤทธิ์, born November 5, 1992) is a Thai professional footballer who plays as a centre back for Thai League 3 club Roi Et PB United.

== Honours ==
=== Clubs ===
BG Pathum United

- Thai FA Cup (1) : 2014

Port

- Thai FA Cup (1) : 2019
