= Toti (footballer, born 1987) =

Spanish footballer

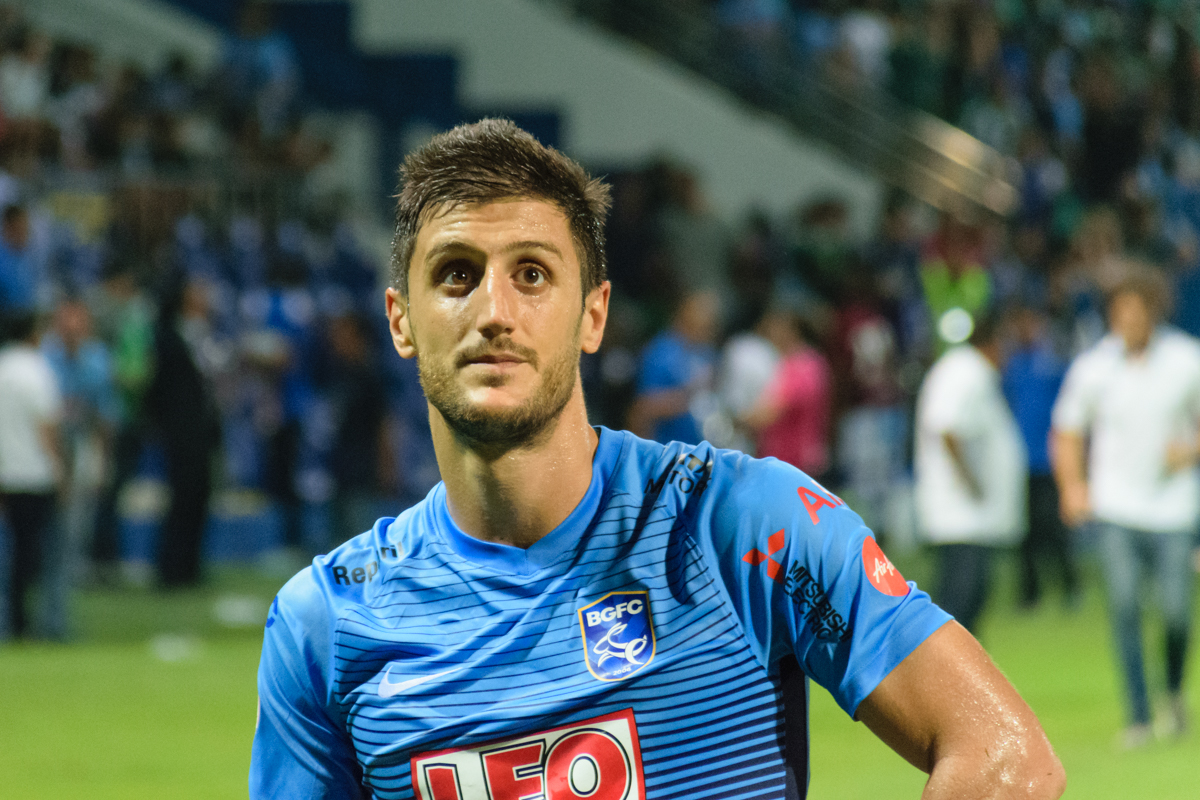

Personal information
- Full name: Daniel García Rodríguez
- Date of birth: 21 September 1987 (age 39)
- Place of birth: Salamanca, Spain
- Height: 1.74 m (5 ft 9 in)
- Position: Attacking midfielder

Youth career
- Salamanca

Senior career*
Years	Team	Apps	(Gls)
2005–2007	Salamanca B		
2005–2011	Salamanca	87	(9)
2011–2014	Granada	0	(0)
2011–2012	→ Cádiz (loan)	22	(1)
2012–2013	→ Hércules (loan)	20	(0)
2013–2014	→ Alavés (loan)	30	(4)
2014–2015	Alavés	36	(8)
2015–2021	BG Pathum United	106	(24)
2020–2021	→ Samut Prakan City (loan)	9	(0)
2021–2024	Guijuelo	77	(13)
Total		387	(59)
- * Club domestic league appearances and goals

Daniel García Rodríguez (born 21 September 1987), known as Toti, is a Spanish former professional footballer who played as an attacking midfielder.

== Club career ==
Toti was born in Salamanca, Castile and León. A UD Salamanca youth graduate, he made his senior debut with the reserves in 2005–06 in the Tercera División, while still a junior; he appeared with the main squad the same season, playing five games as they returned to Segunda División at the first attempt.

Toti featured in his first match as a professional on 16 June 2007, coming on as a late substitute in a 1–0 home win against Ciudad de Murcia. He was definitely promoted to the first team in August, and scored his first goal on 8 June 2008, the second of a 3–1 home victory over RC Celta de Vigo.

In August 2011, after suffering relegation from the second division, Toti signed for Granada CF and was immediately loaned to Segunda División B's Cádiz CF. On 31 August of the following year, he joined second-tier Hércules CF also in a temporary deal.

On 30 August 2013, Toti moved to Deportivo Alavés of the same league in a season-long loan. In July 2014, after appearing in 31 competitive matches and scoring four goals, he signed permanently for the club.

== Honours ==
Salamanca

- Segunda División B: 2005–06

BG Pathum United

- Thai League 1: 2020–21
