= Warut Boonsuk =

Thai footballer

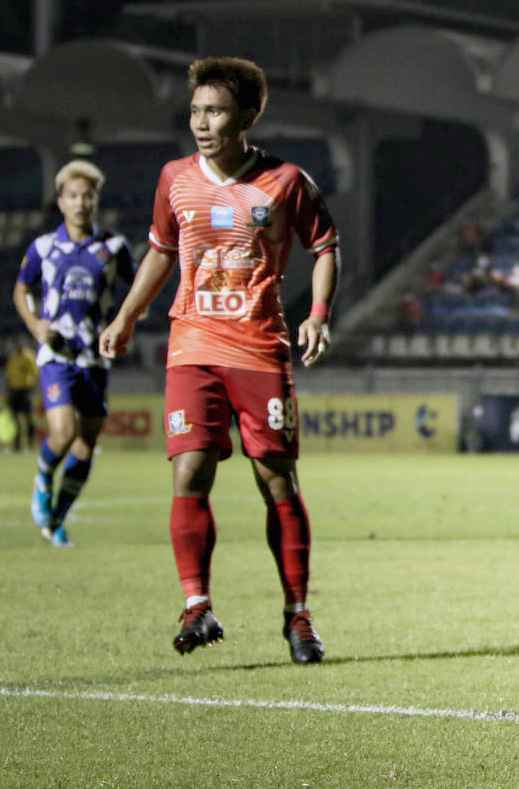

Personal information
- Full name: Warut Boonsuk
- Date of birth: 23 August 1997 (age 29)
- Place of birth: Roi Et, Thailand
- Height: 1.62 m (5 ft 4 in)
- Position: Left wing

Team information
- Current team: Phrae United
- Number: 8

Youth career
- 2009–2014: Bangkok Glass

Senior career*
Years	Team	Apps	(Gls)
2015–2018	Bangkok Glass	15	(0)
2019	→ Chiangmai (loan)	8	(0)
2019	→ Ayutthaya United (loan)	14	(0)
2020	Chiangmai	4	(0)
2021	Khon Kaen	11	(1)
2021–2022	Customs Ladkrabang United	27	(2)
2022–	Phrae United	23	(0)

International career
2016	Thailand U19	2	(1)
2017	Thailand U21	0	(0)
- * Club domestic league appearances and goals as of 30 April 2023

Warut Boonsuk (Thai: วรุตม์ บุญสุข, born August 23, 1997), simply known as Rut (Thai: รุตม์), is a Thai professional footballer who plays as a left winger for Thai League 2 club Phrae United.
