= Ariel Rodríguez (footballer, born 1989) =

Costa Rican association football player

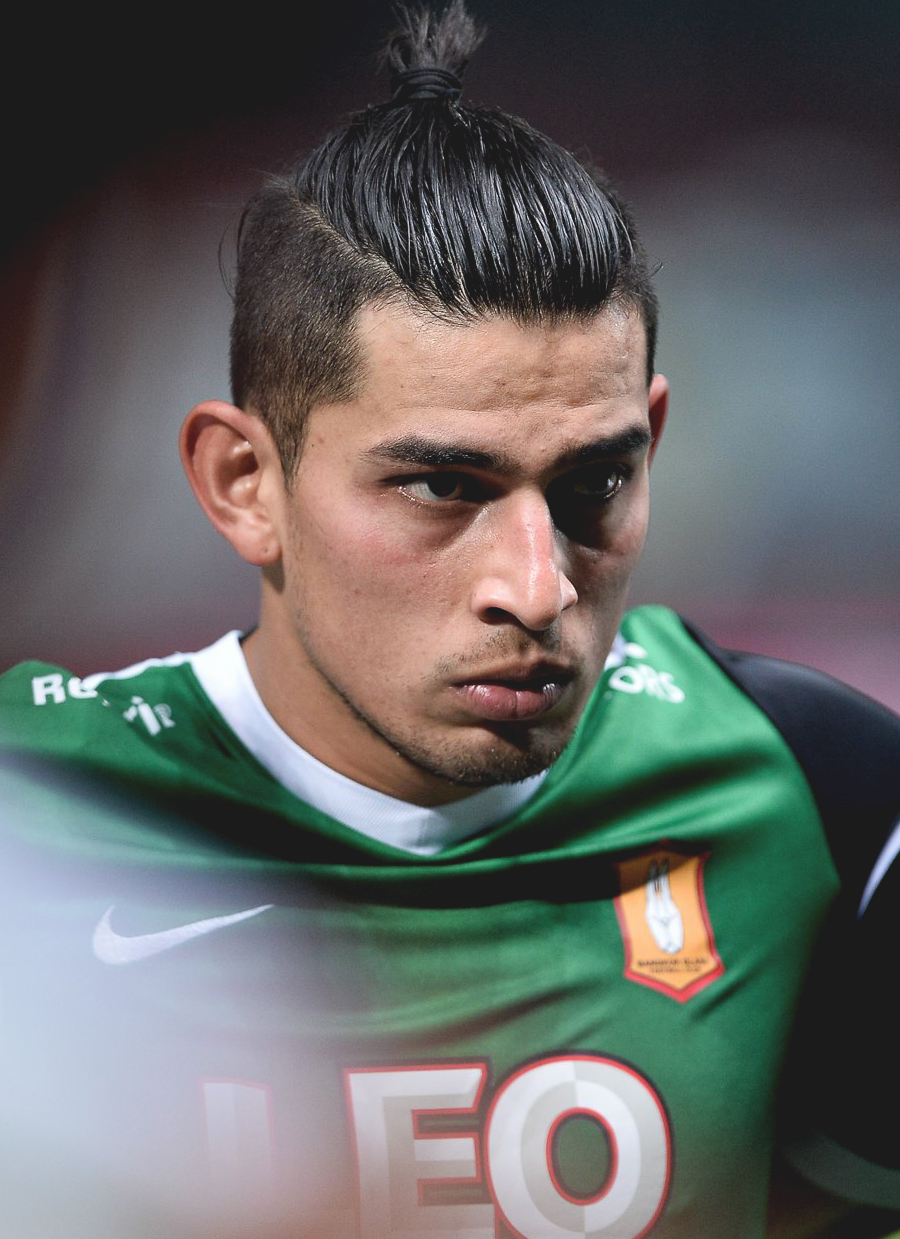
- Rodríguez with Bangkok Glass

Personal information
- Full name: Ariel Francisco Rodríguez Araya
- Date of birth: September 27, 1989 (age 37)
- Place of birth: San José, Costa Rica
- Height: 1.76 m (5 ft 9 1/2 in)
- Positions: Forward; winger

Team information
- Current team: Saprissa
- Number: 14

Youth career
- 1998–2002: Municipal Liberia
- 2005: Fusión Tibás
- 2006–2009: Santos de Guápiles

Senior career*
Years	Team	Apps	(Gls)
2009–2011	Santos de Guápiles	44	(3)
2012	Puntarenas	15	(6)
2012	Belén	8	(3)
2012–2016	Saprissa	123	(51)
2016–2019	BG Pathum United	64	(31)
2018–2019	→ Saprissa (loan)	19	(7)
2019–2020	→ PTT Rayong (loan)	22	(9)
2020	Saprissa	22	(7)
2020	Hồ Chí Minh City	8	(3)
2021–	Saprissa	103	(28)

International career
2016	Costa Rica	3	(1)
- * Club domestic league appearances and goals as of 19:03, 14 January 2024 (UTC)

Ariel Francisco Rodríguez Araya (born September 27, 1989) is a Costa Rican professional footballer who plays as a forward for Liga FPD club Deportivo Saprissa and the Costa Rica national team.

== Career ==
=== Club ===
Deportivo Saprissa

He finished 2015–16 in Costa Rica as league top scorer, with 20.

Bangkok Glass

On January 6, 2016, Rodríguez completed a move to Bangkok Glass on a two years contract. Ariel Rodriguez made the official debut for Bangkok Glass in the first match of 2016 Thai League against Osotspa March 6, 2016. He scored 2 goals in his debut.

== International ==
He debuted and scored his first international goal for Costa Rica against Venezuela.

Ariel was recalled again for the Copa América Centenario squad but then pulled out due to injury and was replaced by Johnny Woodly.

== International goals ==
As of match played 14 July 2017. Costa Rica score listed first, score column indicates score after each Rodríguez goal.

International goals by date, venue, cap, opponent, score, result and competition
No.	Date	Venue	Opponent	Score	Result	Competition
1	27 May 2016	Estadio Nacional de Costa Rica, San José, Costa Rica	Venezuela	2–1	2–1	Friendly
2	14 July 2017	Toyota Stadium, Frisco, United States	French Guiana	1–0	3–0	2017 CONCACAF Gold Cup

== Personal life ==
He is the son of the former Costa Rica footballer, currently a camera operator for Teletica and 1993 CONCACAF Gold Cup third-place Erick Rodríguez.

== Honours ==
Saprissa

- Liga FPD: Clausura 2014, Apertura 2014, Apertura 2015, Clausura 2018, Clausura 2020, Clausura 2021
- Costa Rican Cup: 2013

Individual

- Costa Rican Cup Top Goal Scorers: 2014
- Costa Rican Primera División Top Goal Scorers : 2015–16
