= Chatree Chimtalay =

Thai footballer (born 1983)

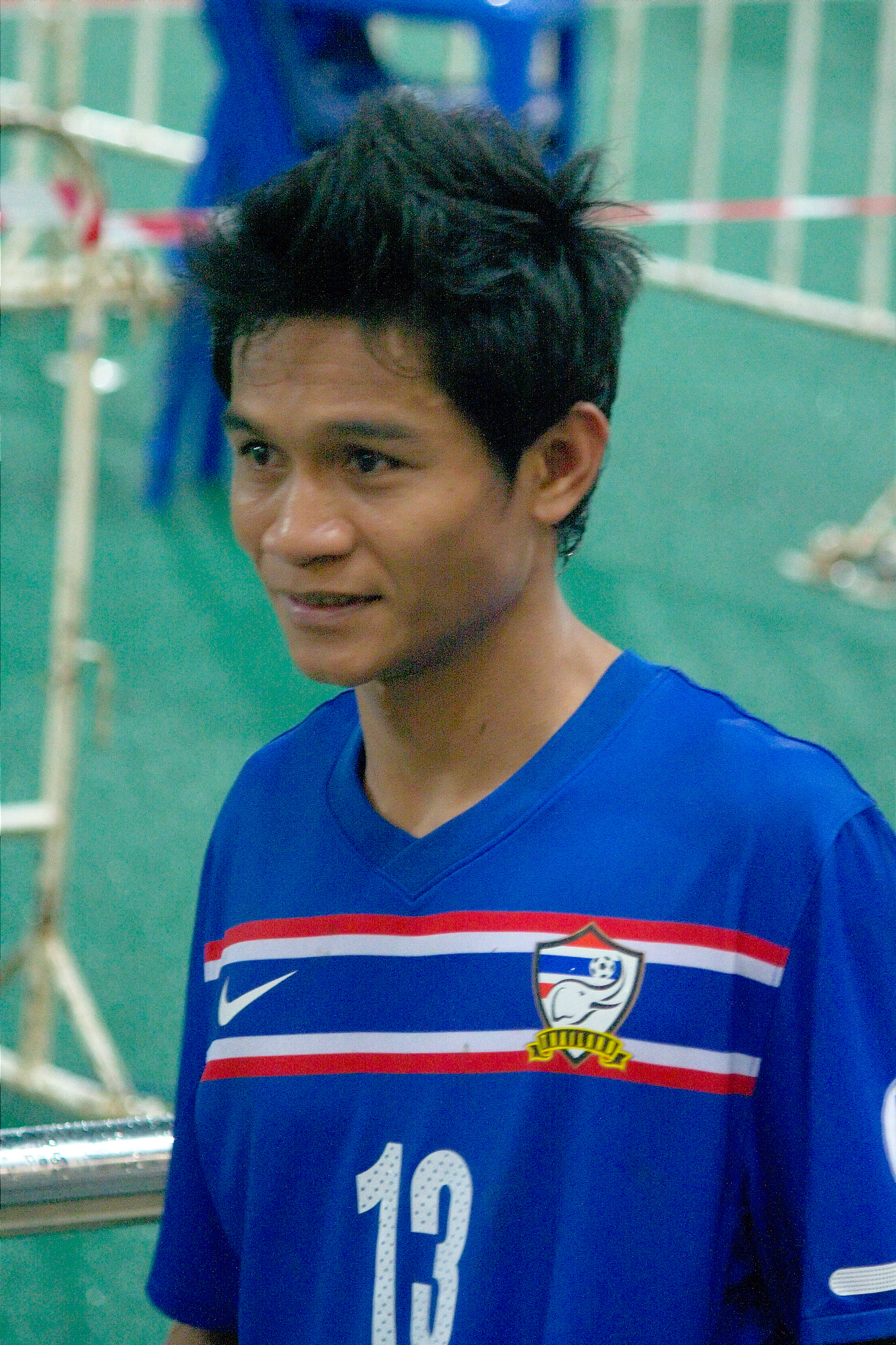
- Chimtalay in 2011

Personal information
- Full name: Chatree Chimtalay
- Date of birth: 14 December 1983 (age 42)
- Place of birth: Nakhon Ratchasima, Thailand
- Height: 1.76 m (5 ft 9 in)
- Positions: Forward; centre-back

Youth career
- 1999–2002: IPE Bangkok

Senior career*
Years	Team	Apps	(Gls)
2003–2005	Bangkok Bravo	29	(10)
2006	Chiangmai	1	(0)
2006–2007	Bangkok Bravo	24	(14)
2008–2023	BG Pathum United	185	(101)
Total		239	(125)

International career
2011–2014	Thailand	13	(1)
- * Club domestic league appearances and goals

Chatree Chimtalay (Thai: ชาตรี ฉิมทะเล, born 14 December 1983) is a Thai retired professional footballer who played as a forward and also centre-back.

== Club career ==
Chimtalay was injured during the 2011 Thai Premier League season, but managed to score 7 goals for his team Bangkok Glass including a hat trick against Khonkaen. By 2021, he had scored 100 goals throughout his career with BG Pathum United since the team was still the Bangkok Glass Sports Association team.

On 12 May 2023, Chimtalay decided to retired from football career with BG Pathum United after the end of the 2022–23 Thai League 1 with 39 year old.

== International career ==
Chimtalay was called up to the national team, in coach Winfried Schäfer first squad selection for the 2014 FIFA World Cup qualification.

Chimtalay's debut for Thailand was as a substitute against Oman in the 2014 FIFA World Cup qualification. In October 2013, he played a friendly match against Bahrain, becoming a substitute. Chimtalay scored his second international goal against Bahrain from a ground cross by Teerasil Dangda. On 15 October 2013 he played against Iran in the 2015 AFC Asian Cup qualification.

== Style of play ==
Even though he is only 1.76 meters tall, Chimtalay scored most of his goals by heading the ball.

== Career statistics ==
As of 8 October 2016

National team	Year	Apps	Goals
Thailand	2011	3	0
Thailand	2012	4	1
Thailand	2013	6	0
Thailand	Total	13	1

#	Date	Venue	Opponent	Score	Result	Competition
1.	24 February 2012	700th Anniversary Stadium, Thailand	Maldives	1–0	3–0	Friendly
—	10 October 2013	Rajamangala Stadium, Thailand	Bahrain	1–0	1–0	Unofficial friendly

== Honours ==
Bangkok Glass/BG Pathum United

- Thai League 1: 2020–21
- Thai League 2: 2019
- Thai FA Cup: 2014
- Thailand Champions Cup: 2021, 2022
- Queen's Cup: 2010
- Singapore Cup: 2010
