= Surachat Sareepim =

Thai footballer (born 1986)

Personal information
- Full name: Surachat Sareepim
- Date of birth: 24 May 1986 (age 40)
- Place of birth: Loei, Thailand
- Height: 1.79 m (5 ft 10 1/2 in)
- Positions: Forward; winger

Team information
- Current team: BG Pathum United
- Number: 9

Youth career
- 1999–2002: Chiangkhan School
- 2003–2004: Patumkongka School

Senior career*
Years	Team	Apps	(Gls)
2005–2016	Police United	76	(27)
2016–	BG Pathum United	152	(35)

International career^{‡}
2011–2026	Thailand	8	(0)
- * Club domestic league appearances and goals as of 6 June 2026 ‡ National team caps and goals as of 9 June 2026

Surachat Sareepim (Thai: สุรชาติ สารีพิมพ์; born 24 May 1986), simply known as Geng (Thai: เก่ง), is a Thai professional footballer who plays as a forward or a winger for Thai League 1 club BG Pathum United.

== Personal life ==
Surachat was born in Chiang Khan, Loei to a Thai father and a Lao mother.

== International career ==
In 2011, Surachat was called up to the national team by Winfried Schäfer for the 2014 World Cup qualification third round.

In 2026, he returned to the national team after 7 years away as a replacement for Iklas Sanron, who withdrew through an injury. He started and played in the first half of the friendly game against Kuwait on 5 June 2026 at his home turf, BG Stadium. He became the oldest active player to play for the Thailand national team.

=== International ===
As of 9 June 2026

National team	Year	Apps	Goals
Thailand
Thailand	2011	2	0
Thailand	2012	4	0
Thailand	2026	2	0
Total		8	0

== Honours ==
=== Club ===
Police United

- Thai Division 1 League (2): 2009, 2015

BG Pathum United

- Thai League 1: 2020–21
- Thai League 2: 2019
- Thailand Champions Cup (2): 2021, 2022
- Thai League Cup: 2023–24
