= 2015 Bangkok Glass F.C. season =

Bangkok Glass
2015 season
- Chairman: Pavin Bhirom Bhakdi
- Manager: Ricardo Rodríguez (20 December 2014 – 23 November 2015); Anurak Srikerd (Caretaker on 23 November 2015 – Present)
- Stadium: Leo Stadium
- Thai Premier League: 6th
- Thai FA Cup: Round of 16
- Thai League Cup: Round of 16
- Kor Royal Cup: Runners-up
- AFC Champions League: Play-off round
- Top goalscorer: League: Aridane Santana; Darko Tasevski (9); All: Aridane Santana (10)
Home colours	Away colours	Third colours

The 2015 season is Bangkok Glass's fifth season in the Thai Premier League, on the name of Bangkok Glass.

== Pre-season and friendlies ==
Date	Opponents	H / A	Result F–A	Scorers
20 December 2014	Air Force Central	H	3–0	Chatree 50', Suradetch 68', Honny 83' (o.g.)
24 December 2014	Sisaket	H	2–3	Chatree 45', Piyachart 45+3'
27 December 2014	Chainat Hornbill	A	2–1	Chatree 48', Suradetch 74'
4 January 2015	(Malaysia) Sime Darby	H	1–0	Chatree 65'
11 January 2015	Osotspa M-150	H	1–0	Narong 10'
14 January 2015	PTT Rayong	A	1–0	Okubo 78' (pen.)
17 January 2015	Army United	A	3–3	Smith 68', Tasevski 80', Kaimbi 81'
2 February 2015	Bangkok United	H	4–2	Bodin 37', Leandro 44', Kaimbi (2) 53', 70'
3 February 2015	Bangkok	H	2–1	Okubo (2) 41' (pen.), 43'

== Kor Royal Cup ==
Coke Charity Cup. It's a match between Buriram United the 2014 Toyota Thai Premier League's champions VS. Bangkok Glass the 2014 Thaicom FA Cup's champions at Supachalasai Stadium, Bangkok, Thailand.

Date	Opponents	H / A	Result F–A	Scorers
24 January 2015	Buriram United	N	0–1; Highlight	

== Thai Premier League ==
Pos	Team	Pld	W	D	L	GF	GA	GD	Pts	Qualification or relegation
4	Chonburi (Q)	34	15	12	7	62	44	+18	57 (Note: CHO 1–0 BKU; BKU 1–1 CHO)	2016 AFC Champions League Qualifying play-off (Note: The winners of the 2015 Thai FA Cup will also qualify for the play-off of the 2016 AFC Champions League. Since the FA Cup winners have already qualified to ACL through the championship and runners-up - because the Thai FA Cup Final is between Buriram and Muangthong - the spot will be awarded to the third-placed team.)
5	Bangkok United	34	16	9	9	59	47	+12	57	
6	Bangkok Glass	34	15	11	8	47	38	+9	56	
7	Ratchaburi	34	17	4	13	48	50	−2	55	
8	Nakhon Ratchasima	34	13	10	11	37	43	−6	49	

Updated to match(es) played on 13 December 2015. Source: Thai Premier League
Rules for classification: 1) points; 2) head-to-head points; 3) head-to-head goal difference; 4) goal difference; 5) number of goals scored
(Q) Qualified for the phase indicated
Notes:

Date	Opponents	H / A	Result F–A	Scorers	League position
22 February 2015	Chiangrai United	A	2–1; Highlight	Tanasith 12', Narong 71'	4th
28 February 2015	SCG Muangthong United	H	0–0; Highlight		5th
7 March 2015	Navy	A	1–0; Highlight	Smith 68'	5th
11 March 2015	Bangkok United	H	1–0; Highlight	Smith 90+4'	2nd
14 March 2015	Sisaket	H	3–2; Highlight	Chatree 34', Leandro 43' (pen.), Tasevski 87'	2nd
5 April 2015	TOT	A	1–2; Highlight	Leandro 90+2'	3rd
26 April 2015	Chonburi	H	2–2; Highlight	Okubo 56', Kaimbi 90+4'	4th
29 April 2015	Army United	A	1–0; Highlight	Tasevski 85'	3rd
3 May 2015	Ratchaburi Mitr Phol	H	1–0; Highlight	Tasevski 90'	2nd
10 May 2015	Chainat Hornbill	A	1–1; Highlight	Chatree 27'	3rd
20 June 2015	Nakhon Ratchasima Mazda	H	3–1; Highlight	Pakin 15', Tanasith 21', Tasevski 37' (pen.)	3rd
27 June 2015	Osotspa M-150	A	0–1; Highlight		3rd
4 July 2015	BEC Tero Sasana	H	5–0; Highlight	Tasevski 8' (pen.), Smith 25', Suban 34', Kaimbi 88', Pakin 90'	2nd
12 July 2015	Gulf Saraburi	H	1–0; Highlight	Kaimbi 90'	2nd
15 July 2015	Buriram United	A	0–0; Highlight		3rd
19 July 2015	Suphanburi	H	2–2; Highlight	Tasevski 23' (pen.), Anan 90+1'	3rd
25 July 2015	Port MTI	A	1–0; Highlight	Tanasith 34'	3rd
2 August 2015	Chiangrai United	H	3–2; Highlight	Bodin 16', Krissadee 50' (o.g.), Tasevski 56' (pen.)	3rd
9 August 2015	SCG Muangthong United	A	0–5; Highlight		3rd
16 August 2015	Navy	H	4–1; Highlight	Tasevski 18', Bodin 22', Pakin (2) 57', 89'	3rd
19 August 2015	Bangkok United	A	0–2; Highlight		3rd
12 September 2015	Chonburi	A	2–2; Highlight	Tasevski 86' (pen.), Smith 90+6'	3rd
20 September 2015	Army United	H	3–3; Highlight	Aridane (2) 33', 55', Praweenwat 90+1'	3rd
26 September 2015	Ratchaburi Mitr Phol	A	0–1; Highlight		3rd
17 October 2015	Chainat Hornbill	H	3–0; Highlight	Aridane (2) 71', 75', Bodin 90+3'	3rd
24 October 2015	Nakhon Ratchasima Mazda	A	0–1; Highlight		4th
28 October 2015	Osotspa M-150 Samut Prakan	H	1–1; Highlight	Aridane 51'	3rd
1 November 2015	BEC Tero Sasana	A	1–1; Highlight	Okubo 5'	4th
15 November 2015	TOT	H	2–1; Highlight	Aridane (2) 64', 90+5'	3rd
22 November 2015	Gulf Saraburi	A	0–2; Highlight		5th
28 November 2015	Buriram United	H	1–3; Highlight	Toti 43'	6th
6 December 2015	Suphanburi	A	0–0; Highlight		6th
9 December 2015	Port	H	2–1; Highlight	Aridane (2) 9', 73'	6th
13 December 2015	Sisaket	A	0–0; Highlight		6th

== AFC Champions League ==
Date	Opponents	H / A	Result F–A	Scorers	Round
10 February 2015	(Malaysia) Johor Darul Ta'zim	H	3–0; Highlight	Narong 28', Kaimbi (2) 52', 62'	Preliminary round 2
17 February 2015	(China) Beijing Guoan	A	0–3; Highlight		Play-off round

== Thai FA Cup ==
Chang FA Cup

Date	Opponents	H / A	Result F–A	Scorers	Round
24 June 2015	Samut Prakan Song Sing	A	2–0; Highlight	Kaimbi 2', Anan 63'	Round of 64
29 July 2015	Rangsit	H	3–1	Okubo 20', Tossaphol 42', Bodin 76'	Round of 32
12 August 2015	Buriram United	H	1–3; Highlight	Aridane 81'	Round of 16

== Thai League Cup ==
Toyota League Cup

Date	Opponents	H / A	Result F–A	Scorers	Round
18 April 2015	Sa Kaeo	A	2–1; Highlight	Okubo 5', Kaimbi 74'	Round of 64
1 July 2015	BBCU	A	3–1; Highlight	Praweenwat 36' (pen.), Smith 77', Bodin 90'	Round of 32
22 July 2015	Buriram United	H	0–0 (a.e.t.) (2–4p); Highlight		Round of 16

== Squad statistics ==
No.	Pos.	Name	League		FA Cup		League Cup		Kor Royal Cup		Asia		Total		Discipline	
No.	Pos.	Name	Apps	Goals	Apps	Goals	Apps	Goals	Apps	Goals	Apps	Goals	Apps	Goals	Yellow card	Red card
1	GK	(Thailand) Narit Taweekul	30	0	2	0	3	0	1	0	2	0	38	0	2	0
2	DF	(Thailand) Wasan Homsaen	20(1)	0	2	0	1	0	1	0	2	0	26(1)	0	8	0
4	DF	(Australia) Matt Smith	33	4	1	0	3	1	1	0	2	0	40	5	8	0
5	DF	(Thailand) Praweenwat Boonyong	18(4)	1	2	0	0(1)	1	0	0	2	0	22(5)	2	6	0
6	DF	(Thailand) Piyachart Tamaphan	0(1)	0	0	0	0	0	0	0	0	0	0(1)	0	0	0
8	MF	(Thailand) Narong Jansawek	18(8)	1	2	0	2	0	0(1)	0	2	1	24(9)	2	5	0
9	FW	(Spain) Aridane Santana	12(4)	9	1(1)	1	1	0	0	0	0	0	14(5)	10	1	0
10	MF	(Thailand) Pakin Kaikaew	15(14)	4	1(1)	0	1(1)	0	0(1)	0	0	0	17(17)	4	5	0
11	MF	(Spain) Toti	15(1)	1	1	0	0	0	0	0	0	0	16(1)	1	3	0
16	MF	(Thailand) Bodin Phala	15(10)	3	0(2)	1	3	1	0	0	0(2)	0	18(14)	5	1	0
17	DF	(Thailand) Supachai Komsilp	11(2)	0	2	0	1	0	1	0	0(1)	0	15(3)	0	3	0
18	GK	(Thailand) Sarawut Konglarp	1	0	0	0	0	0	0	0	0	0	1	0	0	0
19	MF	(Thailand) Anuwat Promyotha	0	0	1	0	0	0	0	0	0	0	1	0	0	0
20	MF	(Thailand) Suradetch Thongchai	0	0	0	0	0	0	1	0	0	0	1	0	0	0
21	DF	(Thailand) Jetsadakorn Hemdaeng	15(6)	0	2	0	3	0	0	0	2	0	22(6)	0	4	0
22	MF	(North Macedonia) Darko Tasevski	22(8)	9	0(1)	0	2(1)	0	1	0	2	0	27(10)	9	9	0
23	MF	(Thailand) Peeraphong Pichitchotirat (vc)	24(3)	0	3	0	3	0	1	0	0	0	31(3)	0	15	2
24	MF	(Thailand) Siwakorn Sangwong	18(3)	0	1	0	1(1)	0	0	0	0	0	20(4)	0	6	0
26	DF	(Thailand) Worawut Namvech	0	0	1	0	0	0	0	0	0	0	1	0	0	0
27	FW	(Thailand) Anan Buasang	5(7)	1	1(1)	1	1(1)	0	0	0	0	0	7(9)	2	1	0
28	MF	(Thailand) Ongart Pamonprasert	0	0	0	0	0	0	1	0	0	0	1	0	0	0
29	FW	(Thailand) Chatree Chimtalay (c)	13(5)	2	1(1)	0	0(1)	0	1	0	0(2)	0	15(9)	2	3	0
30	DF	(Thailand) Tossaphol Chomchon	1(1)	0	1	1	0	0	0	0	0	0	2(1)	1	0	0
31	DF	(Thailand) Nattaphol Sukchai	1	0	1	0	0	0	0	0	0	0	2	0	0	0
34	DF	(Thailand) Piyachanok Darit	3	0	1	0	0	0	0	0	0	0	4	0	0	0
35	DF	(Thailand) Tassanapong Muaddarak	1	0	0	0	0	0	0	0	0	0	1	0	0	0
36	DF	(Thailand) Suwannapat Kingkaew	21	0	0(1)	0	2	0	1	0	2	0	26(1)	0	4	0
37	MF	(Thailand) Suban Ngernprasert	7(6)	1	2	0	2	0	0	0	0	0	11(6)	1	5	0
38	GK	(Thailand) Pornchai Kasikonudompaisan	3	0	1	0	0	0	0	0	0	0	4	0	0	0
39	MF	(Thailand) Tanasith Siripala	23(4)	3	0(1)	0	1	0	0	0	2	0	26(5)	3	4	0
40	FW	(Japan) Goshi Okubo	11(8)	2	2	1	1(1)	1	0	0	0	0	14(9)	4	3	0
—	FW	(Namibia) Lazarus Kaimbi	12(2)	3	1	1	2	1	1	0	2	2	18(2)	7	9	1
—	FW	(Brazil) Leandro Oliveira	6(3)	2	0	0	0(1)	0	0(1)	0	2	0	8(5)	2	3	0
—	—	Own goals	–	2	–	0	–	0	–	0	–	0	–	2	–	–

== Transfers ==
First Thai footballer's market is opening on 6 November 2014 to 28 January 2015

Second Thai footballer's market is opening on 3 June 2015 to 30 June 2015

=== In ===
Date	Pos.	Name	From
2 December 2014	MF	(Thailand) Narong Jansawek	(Thailand) Osotspa M-150
3 December 2014	GK	(Thailand) Sarawut Konglarp	(Thailand) Army United
3 December 2014	MF	(Thailand) Anuwat Promyotha	(Thailand) Chamchuri United
16 December 2014	DF	(Australia) Matt Smith	(Australia) Brisbane Roar
8 January 2015	FW	(Brazil) Leandro Oliveira	(Thailand) Port
12 July 2015	FW	(Spain) Aridane Santana	(Spain) Tenerife
28 July 2015	MF	(Spain) Toti	(Spain) Deportivo Alavés

=== Out ===
Date	Pos.	Name	To
20 November 2014	MF	(France) Flavien Michelini	(Thailand) Ratchaburi Mitr Phol
20 November 2014	DF	(United States) Zourab Tsiskaridze	(United States) San Antonio Scorpions
25 November 2014	DF	(Japan) Teruyuki Moniwa	(Japan) Cerezo Osaka
25 January 2015	MF	(Thailand) Phuritad Jarikanon	(Thailand) Chonburi
25 January 2015	DF	(Thailand) Tassana Cheamsa-art	(Thailand) Saraburi
28 January 2015	GK	(Thailand) Teerapong Puttasukha	(Thailand) Nakhon Pathom United
28 January 2015	MF	(Thailand) Chalermkiat Boonnet	(Thailand) Ubon UMT United
28 January 2015	MF	(Thailand) Suradej Thongchai	(Thailand) PTT Rayong
3 June 2015	DF	(Thailand) Piyachart Tamaphan	(Thailand) Port MTI
27 July 2015	FW	(Namibia) Lazarus Kaimbi	Released

=== Loan out ===
Date from	Date to	Pos.	Name	To
3 June 2015	31 December 2015	FW	(Brazil) Leandro	(Thailand) Osotspa Samut Prakan
3 June 2015	31 December 2015	GK	(Thailand) Sarawut Konglarp	(Thailand) Navy
3 June 2015	31 December 2015	MF	(Thailand) Anuwat Promyotha	(Thailand) Sukhothai
