= 2013 Thai FA Cup final =

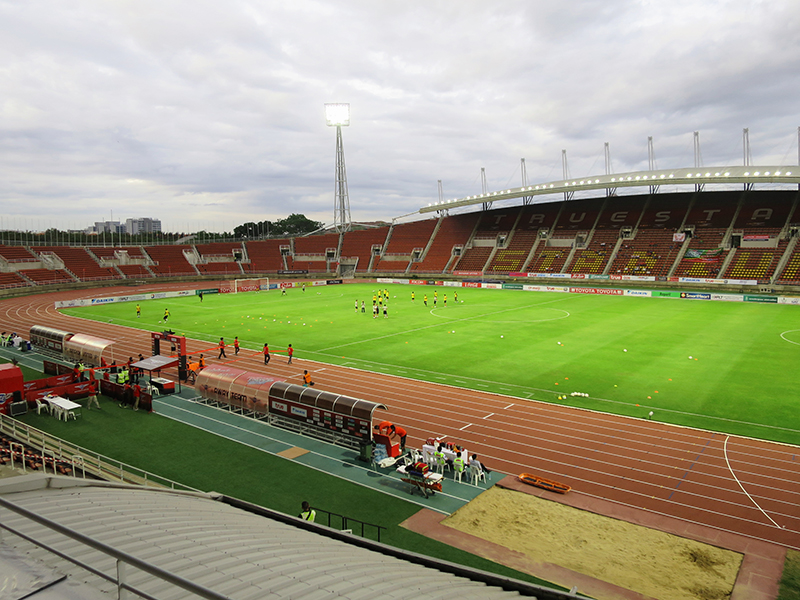
- The match took place at Thammasat Stadium.
- Event: 2013 Thai FA Cup
Bangkok Glass	Buriram United
1	3
- Date: 10 November 2013
- Venue: Thammasat Stadium, Pathum Thani
- Man of the Match: Carmelo González
- Referee: Yudai Yamamoto (Japan)

The 2013 Thai FA Cup final was the 20th final of Thailand's domestic football cup competition, the FA Cup. The final was played at Thammasat Stadium in Pathum Thani on 10 November 2013. The match was contested by Bangkok Glass, who beat Police United 5–2 in their semi-final, and Buriram United who beat Muangthong United 1–0 in the match. After Chatree Chimtalay opened the scoring in 17th minute, Osmar, Carmelo González and Kai Hirano equalised in the 32nd, 53rd and 60th minutes before the draw and Buriram United beat Bangkok Glass 3–1 .

== Road to the final ==
Note: In all results below, the score of the finalist is given first (H: home; A: away; TPL: Clubs from Thai Premier League; D1: Clubs from Thai Division 1 League; D2: Clubs from Regional League Division 2).

Bangkok Glass (TPL)		Round	Buriram United (TPL)	
Opponent	Result	Knockout 1 leg	Opponent	Result
Chonburi (TPL)	1–0 (H)	Round of 32	Chainat (TPL)	2–1 (H)
Trat (D1)	2–1 (A)	Round of 16	Samut Songkhram (TPL)	2–0 (A)
Bangkok (D1)	1–0 (A)	Quarter-finals	Singhtarua (D1)	3–0 (H)
Police United (TPL)	5–2 (N)	Semi-finals	Muangthong United (TPL)	1–0 (N)

== Match ==
=== Details ===
10 November 2013
18:00 UTC+7

Bangkok Glass	1 – 3	Buriram United
Chatree 17'	Report	Osmar 32' (pen.); Carmelo González 53'; Kai 59'

Thammasat Stadium, Pathum Thani
Referee: Yudai Yamamoto (Japan)

Bangkok Glass	Buriram United

BANGKOK GLASS:
GK	1	(Thailand) Narit Taweekul
DF	2	(Thailand) Wasan Homsaen
DF	26	(Australia) Goran Šubara	(yellow card) 31' (yellow-red card) 80'
DF	30	(Thailand) Pravinwat Boonyong	(yellow card) 45'
DF	32	(Thailand) Piyachart Tamaphan
DF	16	(Thailand) Peter Läng		(substituted off) 88'
MF	9	(Brazil) Leandro Dos Santos
MF	7	(France) Flavien Michelini	(yellow card) 57'	(substituted off) 86'
FW	14	(Thailand) Teeratep Winothai (c)
MF	10	(Thailand) Suphasek Kaikaew		(substituted off) 67'
FW	29	(Thailand) Chatree Chimtalay
Substitutes:
GK	18	(Thailand) Kritsana Klanklin
DF	6	(Thailand) Amnaj Kaewkiew
MF	15	(Thailand) Phuritad Jarikanon		(substituted on) 86'
MF	20	(Japan) Hironori Saruta		(substituted on) 67'
MF	28	(Thailand) Ongart Pamonprasert
MF	36	(Thailand) Suwannapat Kingkkaew
MF	39	(Thailand) Thanasit Siriphala		(substituted on) 88'
Manager:
(Thailand) Attaphol Buspakom

BURIRAM UNITED:
GK	1	(Thailand) Sivaruck Tedsungnoen
DF	6	(Thailand) Tanasak Srisai
DF	5	(Spain) Osmar Ibáñez
DF	3	(Thailand) Pratum Chuthong	(yellow card) 45+1'	(substituted off) 46'
DF	2	(Thailand) Theeraton Bunmathan
MF	17	(Thailand) Anawin Jujeen	(yellow card) 58'	(substituted off) 67'
MF	13	(Thailand) Jirawat Makarom
MF	8	(Thailand) Suchao Nuchnum (c)
MF	40	(Spain) Manuel Redondo Garcia
FW	7	(Spain) Carmelo González	(yellow card) 35'
FW	19	(Japan) Kai Hirano		(substituted off) 87'
Substitutes:
GK	26	(Thailand) Yodsapon Tiangda
DF	25	(Thailand) Suree Sukha		(substituted on) 67'
MF	4	(Thailand) Charyl Chappuis
MF	10	(Thailand) Jakkraphan Kaewprom		(substituted on) 46'
MF	11	(Thailand) Ekkachai Sumrei
MF	15	(Thailand) Surat Sukha
FW	22	(Thailand) Adisak Kraisorn		(substituted on) 87'
Manager:
(Spain) Alejandro Menéndez

Assistant referees:
Toru Sagara (Japan)
Toshiyuki Nagi (Japan)
Fourth official:
Chaiya Mahapab (Thailand)

MATCH RULES

- 90 minutes.
- 30 minutes of extra-time if necessary.
- Penalty shootout if scores still level.
- Nine named substitutes
- Maximum of 3 substitutions.
