= Thai League All-Star Football =

Thai League All-Star football team
- Founded: 2008
- Region: Thai League 1 (AFC)
- Teams: 1
- Broadcaster(s): Channel 3, Channel 7, Channel 9 MCOT HD, NBT-TV, Thairath TV

The Thai League All-Star football team is an annual exhibition match organised by the Football Association of Thailand and sponsors or affiliated clubs in the Thai League 1. The inaugural match was played in 2008.

== Fixtures and results ==
Win Draw Lose

Date	Tournament	Location	Opponent	Score	Scorers	Refs
May 17, 2008	Friendly	Rajamangala Stadium, Bangkok	(England) Manchester City	3–1(W)	(TPL All-Star); Ney Fabiano 37'; Tawan Sripan 44'; Tana Chanabut 73' (Manchester City); Felipe Caicedo 22'	
August 1, 2010	Friendly	Rajamangala Stadium, Bangkok	(Spain) Atlético Madrid	0–3(L)	(Atlético Madrid); Eduardo Salvio 16'; Álvaro Domínguez 26'; Simão 85'	
July 24, 2011	Friendly	Rajamangala Stadium, Bangkok	(England) Chelsea	0–4(L)	(Chelsea); Frank Lampard 38'; José Bosingwa 50'; Branislav Ivanović 52'; Florent Malouda 73'	
May 23, 2012	Friendly	SCG Stadium, Nonthaburi	(South Korea) Park Ji-Sung & Friend	4–2(W)	(TPL All-Star); Teerasil Dangda 18'; Akarawin Sawasdee 65'; Phuwadol Suwannachart 68', 73' (Park Ji-Sung & Friend); Lee Chung-Yong 32', 45'	
August 15, 2012	Friendly	Suphachalasai Stadium, Bangkok	Thailand	1–5(L)	(TPL All-Star) (Foreign players); Douglas 45' (Thailand); Teerasil Dangda 29'; Sumanya Purisai 60'; Chatree Chimtalay 80'; Mongkol Namnuad 83'; Adul Lahso 84'	
July 13, 2013	Friendly	Rajamangala Stadium, Bangkok	(England) Manchester United	1–0(W)	(Singha All-Star); Teeratep Winothai 49'	
July 17, 2013	Friendly	Rajamangala Stadium, Bangkok	(England) Chelsea	0–1(L)	(Chelsea); Romelu Lukaku 34' (pen.)	
July 24, 2013	Friendly	Rajamangala Stadium, Bangkok	Thailand U-23	3–3(D)	(Thailand All-Star); Sarayoot Chaikamdee 34'; Teeratep Winothai 45'; Korrakot Wiriyaudomsiri 53' (Thailand U-23); Artit Daosawang 56'; Sarawut Masuk 80'; Chananan Pombuppha 85' (pen.)	
July 16, 2014	Friendly	Rajamangala Stadium, Bangkok	Thailand U-23	3–2(W)	(TPL All-Star) (Japanese players); Hironori Saruta 28'; Yuki Bamba 79'; Teruaki Kurobe 81' (Thailand U-23); Pokklaw Anan 22'; Chad Chaiyabutr 67'	
May 30, 2015	Friendly	Rajamangala Stadium, Bangkok	(England) Chelsea	0–1(L)	(Chelsea); Dominic Solanke 13'	
July 8, 2015	Friendly	National Stadium, Bangkok	(England) Reading	2–2(D)	(TPL All-Star); Pakorn 45'; Pinyo 56' (Reading); Blackman 35'; Pogrebnyak 78'	
July 14, 2015	Friendly	Rajamangala Stadium, Bangkok	(England) Liverpool	0–4(L)	(Liverpool); Marković 3'; Sakho 42'; Lallana 52'; Origi 88'	
August 26, 2017	Friendly	Boonyachinda Stadium, Bangkok	Thailand	3–3(D)	(Thai League All-Star); Bajram Nebihi 33'; Renan Marques 42'; Marcel Essombé 90' (Thailand); Supachok Sarachat 2'; David Rochela 53' (o.g.); Bodin Phala 63'	
November 14, 2020	Friendly	Rajamangala Stadium, Bangkok	Thailand	2–2(D)	(Thai League All-Star); Barros Tardeli 45'; Leandro Assumpção 87' (Thailand); Manuel Bihr 21'; Phanuphong Phonsa 65'	

== Squads ==
=== 2013 All-Star members ===
Match Date: July 13, 2013
Opposition: Manchester United
Competition: Singha 80th Anniversary Cup

Managers	(Thailand) Piyapong Pue-on		
Goalkeepers	Defenders	Midfielders	Forwards
(Thailand) Narit (Bangkok Glass) (Thailand) Kritsana (Bangkok Glass) (Thailand) Thanongsak (Chiangrai UTD)	(Thailand) Artit (Muangthong UTD) (Thailand) Thitipan (Muangthong UTD) (South Korea) Kim Yoo-Jin (Muangthong UTD) (North Korea) Ri Kwang-Chon (Muangthong UTD) (Costa Rica) José Mena (Bangkok Glass) (Thailand) Pravinwat (Bangkok Glass) (Thailand) Apiwat (BEC Tero) (Thailand) Nattaporn (Bangkok UTD)	(Thailand) Datsakorn (Muangthong UTD) (Thailand) Pichitphong (Muangthong UTD) (Ivory Coast) Dagno Siaka (Muangthong UTD) (North Macedonia) Mario Gjurovski (Muangthong UTD) (Thailand) Piyachart (Bangkok Glass) (Thailand) Apipoo (Osotspa) (Thailand) Jetsada (Osotspa) (Thailand) Teerasak (Chiangrai UTD)	(Thailand) Teerasil (Muangthong UTD) (Thailand) Chatree (Bangkok Glass) (Thailand) Teeratep (c) (Bangkok Glass) (Thailand) Sompong (Bangkok UTD)

Match Date: July 17, 2013
Opposition: Chelsea
Competition: Singha 80th Anniversary Cup

Managers	(Thailand) Piyapong Pue-on		
Goalkeepers	Defenders	Midfielders	Forwards
(Thailand) Narit (Bangkok Glass) (Thailand) Kritsana (Bangkok Glass) (Thailand) Thanongsak (Chiangrai UTD)	(Thailand) Thitipan (Muangthong UTD) (Iraq) Hussein Alaa (Bangkok UTD) (Thailand) Nattaporn (c) (Bangkok UTD) (Thailand) Korrakot (Bangkok Glass) (Australia) Goran (Bangkok Glass) (Thailand) Pravinwat (Bangkok Glass) (Democratic Republic of the Congo) Belux (BEC Tero) (Thailand) Apichet (BEC Tero)	(Japan) Sho (BEC Tero) (Thailand) Rangsan (BEC Tero) (Thailand) Chanathip (BEC Tero) (Thailand) Tanaboon (BEC Tero) (Thailand) Phuritad (Bangkok Glass) (Thailand) Apipoo (Osotspa) (Thailand) Jetsada (Osotspa) (Thailand) Teerasak (Chiangrai UTD)	(Brazil) Cleiton (BEC Tero) (Namibia) Kaimbi (Bangkok Glass) (France) Gasmi (Bangkok UTD) (Thailand) Sompong (Bangkok UTD)

Match Date: July 24, 2013
Opposition: Thailand U-23
Competition: Friendly

Managers	(Thailand) Piyapong Pue-on		
Goalkeepers	Defenders	Midfielders	Forwards
(Thailand) Narit (Bangkok Glass) (Thailand) Kritsana (Bangkok Glass)	(North Korea) Ri Kwang-Chon (Muangthong UTD) (Thailand) Panupong (Muangthong UTD) (Iraq) Hussein Alaa (Bangkok UTD) (Thailand) Apiwat (BEC Tero) (Thailand) Apichet (BEC Tero) (Thailand) Korrakot (Bangkok Glass)	(Thailand) Datsakorn (Muangthong UTD) (Ivory Coast) Dagno Siaka (Muangthong UTD) (North Macedonia) Mario Gjurovski (Muangthong UTD) (Thailand) Piyachart (Bangkok Glass) (Thailand) Jetsada (Osotspa) (Thailand) Rangsan (BEC Tero)	(Thailand) Sarayoot (Samut Songkhram) (Thailand) Chatree (Bangkok Glass) (Thailand) Teeratep (c) (Bangkok Glass) (Thailand) Sompong (Bangkok UTD)

=== 2014 All-Star members (Japanese players) ===
Match Date: July 16, 2014
Opposition: Thailand U-23
Competition: Friendly match Thailand Asian Game Team VS All-Star Japan Thai Premier League

Managers	(Japan) Masahiro Wada		
Goalkeepers	Defenders	Midfielders	Forwards
(Japan) Daisuke Tada (Sriracha) (Japan) Jun Kochi (Pattaya UTD)	(Japan) Teruyuki Moniwa (Bangkok Glass) (Japan) Hiromichi Katano (Osotspa Saraburi) (Japan) Seiji Kaneko (Ang Thong) (Japan) Yuki Miyazawa (Sriracha) (Japan) Yusuke Sato (Phuket)	(Japan) Hironori Saruta (Port) (Japan) Yuki Bamba (Chonburi) (Japan) Kazuto Kushida (Chonburi) (Japan) Yuji Funayama (Army UTD) (Japan) Yusuke Kato (Samut Songkhram) (Japan) Norihiro Nishi (Police UTD) (Japan) Nobuhito Takahashi (Ang Thong) (Japan) Kento Tsurumaki (Ayutthaya) (Japan) Seiya Kojima (Ayutthaya)	(Japan) Teruaki Kurobe (TTM Customs) (Japan) Robert Cullen (Suphanburi) (Japan) Goshi Okubo (Bangkok Glass)

=== 2017 All-Star members ===
Match Date: August 26, 2017
Opposition: Thailand
Competition: Come Together - Together For Thailand Charity Match

Managers	(England) Mike Mulvey and (Serbia) Miloš Joksić		
Goalkeepers	Defenders	Midfielders	Forwards
(United States) Devala Gorrick (Pattaya UTD) (Thailand) Kampol Pathom-attakul (BEC Tero) (Thailand) Witsanusak Kaewruang (BEC Tero)	(Brazil) Célio (Muangthong UTD) (Japan) Naoaki Aoyama (Muangthong UTD) (Ivory Coast) Fodé Diakité (Chonburi) (Spain) Mario Álvarez (BEC Tero) (Spain) David Rochela (c) (Port) (Brazil) Wellington Priori (Pattaya UTD) (South Korea) Lee Won-young (Pattaya UTD)	(Brazil) Heberty (Muangthong UTD) (Mali) Kalifa Cissé (BEC Tero) (Germany) Bajram Nebihi (Ubon UMT UTD) (Brazil) Felipe Azevedo (Chiangrai UTD) (Madagascar) John Baggio (Sukhothai) (Japan) Genki Nagasato (Port)	(Brazil) Leandro Assumpção (Muangthong UTD) (Brazil) Jajá (Buriram UTD) (Brazil) Renan Marques (Chonburi) (Brazil) Paulo Rangel (Nakhon Ratchasima) (Cameroon) Marcel Essombé (Ratchaburi) (Bahrain) Jaycee John (Bangkok UTD)

=== 2020 All-Star members ===
Match Date: November 14, 2020
Opposition: Thailand
Competition: THE WARRIORS ARE HERE

Managers	(Brazil) Alexandré Pölking		
Goalkeepers	Defenders	Midfielders	Forwards
(Philippines) Michael Falkesgaard (Bangkok UTD) (Thailand) Kampol Pathom-attakul (Rayong)	(Thailand) Chalermpong Kerdkaew (Nakhon Ratchasima) (Slovenia) Aris Zarifović (Samut Prakan City) (South Korea) Kwon Dae-hee (Police Tero) (South Korea) Park Tae-hyeong (Rayong) (Philippines) Carli de Murga (Chonburi) (Philippines) Martin Steuble (Port)	(Thailand) Chaowat Veerachat (BG Pathum UTD) (Thailand) Rangsan Wiroonsri (Chonburi) (Japan) Mitsuru Maruoka (BG Pathum UTD) (Madagascar) John Baggio (Sukhothai) (Thailand) Chakkit Laptrakul (Samut Prakan City) (Brazil) William Henrique (PT Prachuap) (Thailand) Saharat Sontisawat (Chonburi)	(Montenegro) Dragan Bošković (Chonburi) (Brazil) Leandro Assumpção (Nakhon Ratchasima) (Brazil) Evandro Paulista (Sukhothai) (France) Greg Houla (Police Tero) (Brazil) Barros Tardeli (Samut Prakan City) (Brazil) Ricardo Santos (Trat) (Brazil) Adalgisio Pitbull (Rayong)
