= 2014 Thai FA Cup final =

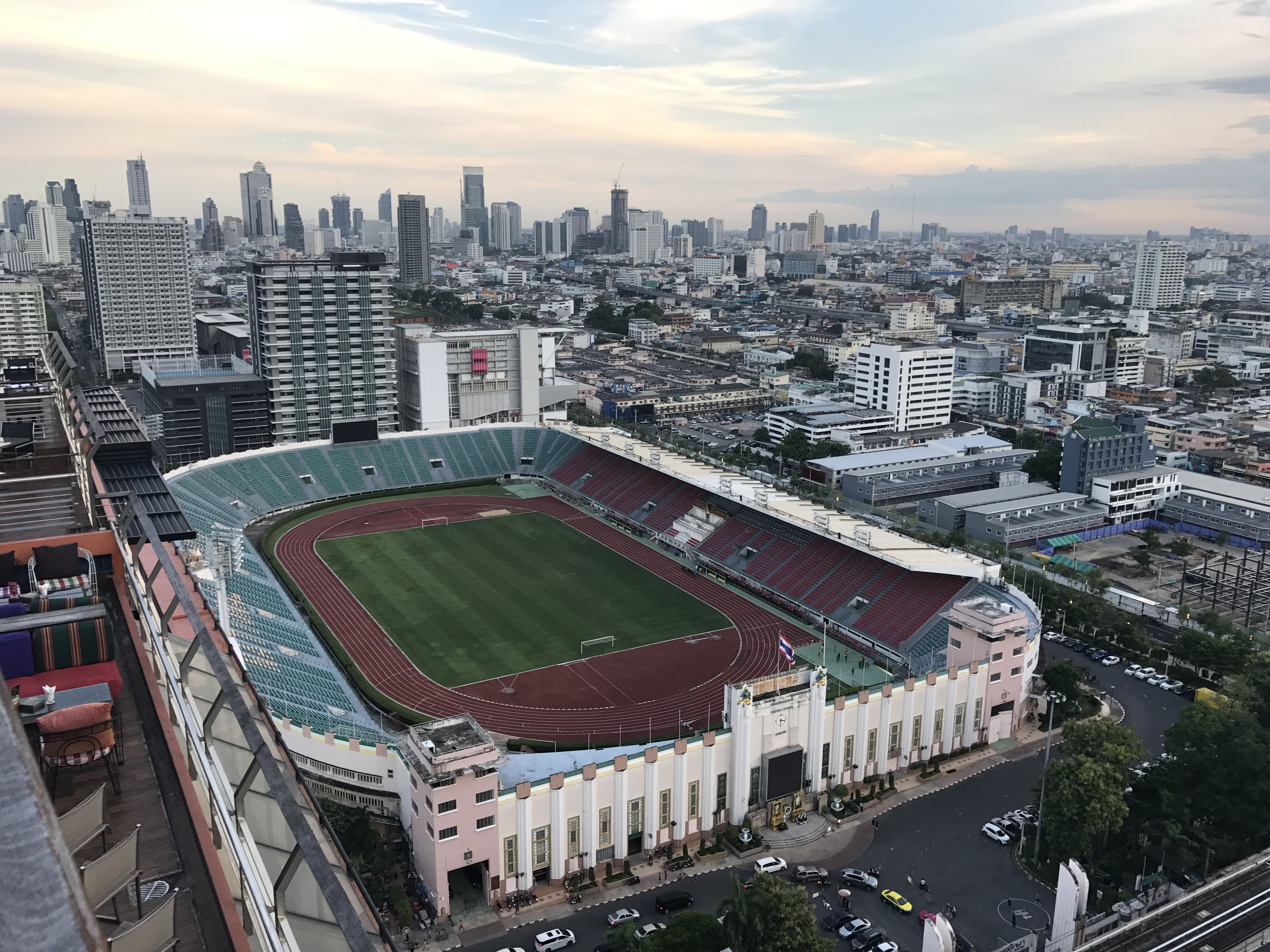
- The match took place at Supachalasai Stadium.
- Event: 2014 Thai FA Cup
| Bangkok Glass | Chonburi |
| 1 | 0 |
- Date: 9 November 2014
- Venue: Supachalasai Stadium, Bangkok
- Man of the Match: Lazarus Kaimbi
- Referee: Sivakorn Pu-Udom

The 2014 Thai FA Cup final was the 21st final of Thailand's domestic football cup competition, the FA Cup. The final was played at Supachalasai Stadium in Bangkok on 9 November 2014. The match was contested by Bangkok Glass, who beat Chiangrai United 6–5 after Penalty shootout of the draw 1–1 in their semi-final, and Chonburi who beat Suphanburi 1–0 in the match. The match was won by Bangkok Glass, defeating Chonburi 1–0 through a goal scored by Lazarus Kaimbi.

== Road to the final ==
Note: In all results below, the score of the finalist is given first (H: home; A: away; TPL: Clubs from Thai Premier League; D1: Clubs from Thai Division 1 League; D2: Clubs from Regional League Division 2).

| Bangkok Glass (TPL) | | Round | Chonburi (TPL) | |
|---|---|---|---|---|
| Opponent | Result | Knockout 1 leg | Opponent | Result |
| Siam Navy (D1) | 3–2 (A) | Round of 32 | Police United (TPL) | 1–0 (A) |
| Buriram United (TPL) | 2–2 (a.e.t.) (5–3 p) (A) | Round of 16 | Ratchaburi (TPL) | 2–0 (H) |
| Muangthong United (TPL) | 2–1 (H) | Quarter-finals | TOT (TPL) | 6–1 (A) |
| Chiangrai United (TPL) | 1–1 (a.e.t.) (5–4 p) (N) | Semi-finals | Suphanburi (TPL) | 1–0 (N) |

== Match ==
=== Details ===
9 November 2014
18:15 UTC+7

| Bangkok Glass | 1 - 0 | Chonburi |
|---|---|---|
| Kaimbi 81' | Report |

Supachalasai Stadium, Bangkok
Referee: Sivakorn Pu-Udom

| Bangkok Glass | Chonburi |

BANGKOK GLASS:
| GK | 1 | (Thailand) Narit Taweekul (c) |
| DF | 2 | (Thailand) Wasan Homsaen |
| DF | 5 | (Thailand) Praweenwat Boonyong | (yellow card) 36' |
| DF | 3 | (Japan) Teruyuki Moniwa | | (substituted off) 90+3' |
| DF | 21 | (Thailand) Jetsadakorn Hemdaeng | | (substituted off) 74' |
| MF | 14 | (Thailand) Peerapong Pichitchotirat | (yellow card) 42' |
| MF | 15 | (Thailand) Phuritad Jarikanon | (yellow card) 63' |
| MF | 36 | (Thailand) Suwannapat Kingkkaew |
| FW | 11 | (Namibia) Lazarus Kaimbi | (yellow card) 90+4' |
| FW | 22 | (North Macedonia) Darko Tasevski |
| FW | 20 | (North Macedonia) Baže Ilijoski | | (substituted off) 67' |
Substitutes:
| GK | 26 | (Thailand) Teerapong Puttasukha |
| DF | 6 | (Thailand) Amnart Kaewkiew |
| DF | 17 | (Thailand) Supachai Komsilp |
| MF | 10 | (Thailand) Suphasek Kaikaew | | (substituted on) 74' |
| MF | 37 | (Thailand) Subun Ngoenprasert |
| FW | 29 | (Thailand) Chatree Chimtalay | | (substituted on) 90+3' |
| FW | 40 | (Japan) Goshi Okubo | | (substituted on) 67' |
Manager:
(Thailand) Anurak Srikerd

CHONBURI:
| GK | 18 | (Thailand) Sinthaweechai Hathairattanakool |
| DF | 11 | (Thailand) Korrakot Wiriyaudomsiri | (yellow card) 34' |
| DF | 6 | (Thailand) Suttinun Phuk-hom |
| DF | 5 | (Thailand) Niweat Siriwong |
| MF | 4 | (Japan) Yuki Bamba | | (substituted off) 53' |
| MF | 28 | (Brazil) Kanu |
| MF | 3 | (Thailand) Natthaphong Samana |
| MF | 19 | (Thailand) Adul Lahso |
| MF | 7 | (Thailand) Chakrit Buathong | | (substituted off) 83' |
| FW | 20 | (Brazil) Juliano Mineiro |
| FW | 10 | (Thailand) Pipob On-Mo (c) | | (substituted off) 64' |
Substitutes:
| GK | 1 | (Thailand) Panupong Pichittham |
| DF | 15 | (Ivory Coast) Fodé Diakité |
| DF | 25 | (Thailand) Chonlatit Chantakam |
| MF | 8 | (Thailand) Therdsak Chaiman | | (substituted on) 83' |
| MF | 28 | (Thailand) Bavorn Tapla | (yellow card) 88' | (substituted on) 53' |
| MF | 36 | (Thailand) Surawich Lokawit |
| FW | 37 | (Timor-Leste) Thiago Cunha | | (substituted on) 64' |
Manager:
(Japan) Masahiro Wada

Assistant referees:
Amnad Pongmanee
Kringsak Kringsongkhram
Fourth official:
Thaweep Inkaew

MATCH RULES

- 90 minutes.
- 30 minutes of extra-time if necessary.
- Penalty shootout if scores still level.
- Nine named substitutes
- Maximum of 3 substitutions.
