= Sivakorn Pu-udom =

Thai football referee

- Born: 26 November 1987 (age 38); Samut Sakhon, Thailand

Domestic
| Years | League | Role |
| 2012– | Thai League 1 | Referee |
| 2013 | Chinese Super League | Referee |
| 2023 | V.League 1 | Referee |

International
| Years | League | Role |
| 2013– | FIFA listed | Referee |

Sivakorn Pu-udom (Thai: ศิวกร ภูอุดม; RTGS: Siwakon Phu-udom, born 26 November 1987) is a Thai football referee. He referees for the Thai League 1, Chinese Super League, V.League 1 and other international competitions. Sivakorn was selected to officiate the Final of the 2018 AFC U-19 Championship

In 2013, Sivakorn became a FIFA elite referee. He also refereed a match in the 2013 Chinese Super League season.

In 2023, FIFA chose him as one of the matches' official referee in the 2019 OFC U-23 Championship, the 2023 FIFA U-20 World Cup as a VAR referee. He has also officiated in the 2018 AFC U-19 Championship and the 2023 AFC Asian Cup.

== Notable matches ==
=== FIFA tournament ===
2023 FIFA U-20 World Cup – Argentina
| Date | Match | Location | Venue | Round | Role |
|---|---|---|---|---|---|
| 21 May 2023 | Nigeria – Dominican Republic | Mendoza | Estadio Malvinas Argentinas | Group stage | VAR |
| 22 May 2023 | Gambia – Honduras | Mendoza | Estadio Malvinas Argentinas | Group stage | VAR |
| 26 May 2023 | Ecuador – Fiji | Santiago del Estero | Estadio Único Madre de Ciudades | Group stage | VAR |

=== AFC tournament ===
2023 AFC Asian Cup – Qatar
| Date | Match | Location | Venue | Round | Role |
|---|---|---|---|---|---|
| 14 January 2024 | United Arab Emirates – Hong Kong | Al Rayyan | Khalifa International Stadium | Group stage | VAR |
| 15 January 2024 | Indonesia – Iraq | Al Rayyan | Ahmad bin Ali Stadium | Group stage | VAR |
| 19 January 2024 | Vietnam – Indonesia | Doha | Abdullah bin Khalifa Stadium | Group stage | VAR |
| 23 January 2024 | Syria – India | Al Khor | Al Bayt Stadium | Group stage | Referee |
| 24 January 2024 | Iraq – Vietnam | Al Rayyan | Jassim bin Hamad Stadium | Group stage | VAR |
| 28 January 2024 | Tajikistan – United Arab Emirates | Al Rayyan | Ahmad bin Ali Stadium | Round of 16 | AVAR |
| 2 February 2024 | Tajikistan – Jordan | Al Rayyan | Ahmad bin Ali Stadium | Quarter-final | AVAR |
| 3 February 2024 | Iran – Japan | Al Rayyan | Education City Stadium | Quarter-final | AVAR |
| 7 February 2024 | Iran – Qatar | Doha | Al Thumama Stadium | Semi-final | VAR |

=== OFC Tournament ===
2019 OFC U-23 Championship – Fiji
| Date | Match | Location | Venue | Round | Role |
|---|---|---|---|---|---|
| 22 September 2019 | Tonga – Fiji | Lautoka | Churchill Park | Group stage | Referee |

=== Others notable matches ===
| Date | Match | Location | Venue | Tournament |
|---|---|---|---|---|
| 1 February 2014 | Buriram United – Muangthong United | Suphan Buri, Thailand | Suphanburi Stadium | 2014 Kor Royal Cup |
| 12 October 2014 | Buriram United – BEC Tero Sasana | Bangkok, Thailand | Suphachalasai Stadium | 2014 Thai League Cup Final |
| 9 November 2014 | Bangkok Glass – Chonburi | Bangkok, Thailand | Suphachalasai Stadium | 2014 Thai FA Cup Final |
| 22 November 2017 | Muangthong United – Chiangrai United | Bangkok, Thailand | Suphachalasai Stadium | 2017 Thai League Cup Final |
| 19 January 2018 | Buriram United – Chiangrai United | Bangkok, Thailand | Suphachalasai Stadium | 2018 Thailand Champions Cup |
| 4 September 2018 | Bangladesh – Bhutan | Dhaka, Bangladesh | Bangabandhu National Stadium | 2018 SAFF Championship Group stage |
| 12 September 2018 | India – Pakistan | Dhaka, Bangladesh | Bangabandhu National Stadium | 2018 SAFF Championship Semi-finals |
| 18 December 2019 | Hong Kong – China | Busan, South Korea | Busan Asiad Main Stadium | 2019 EAFF E-1 Football Championship |
