= 2017 Thai League Cup final =

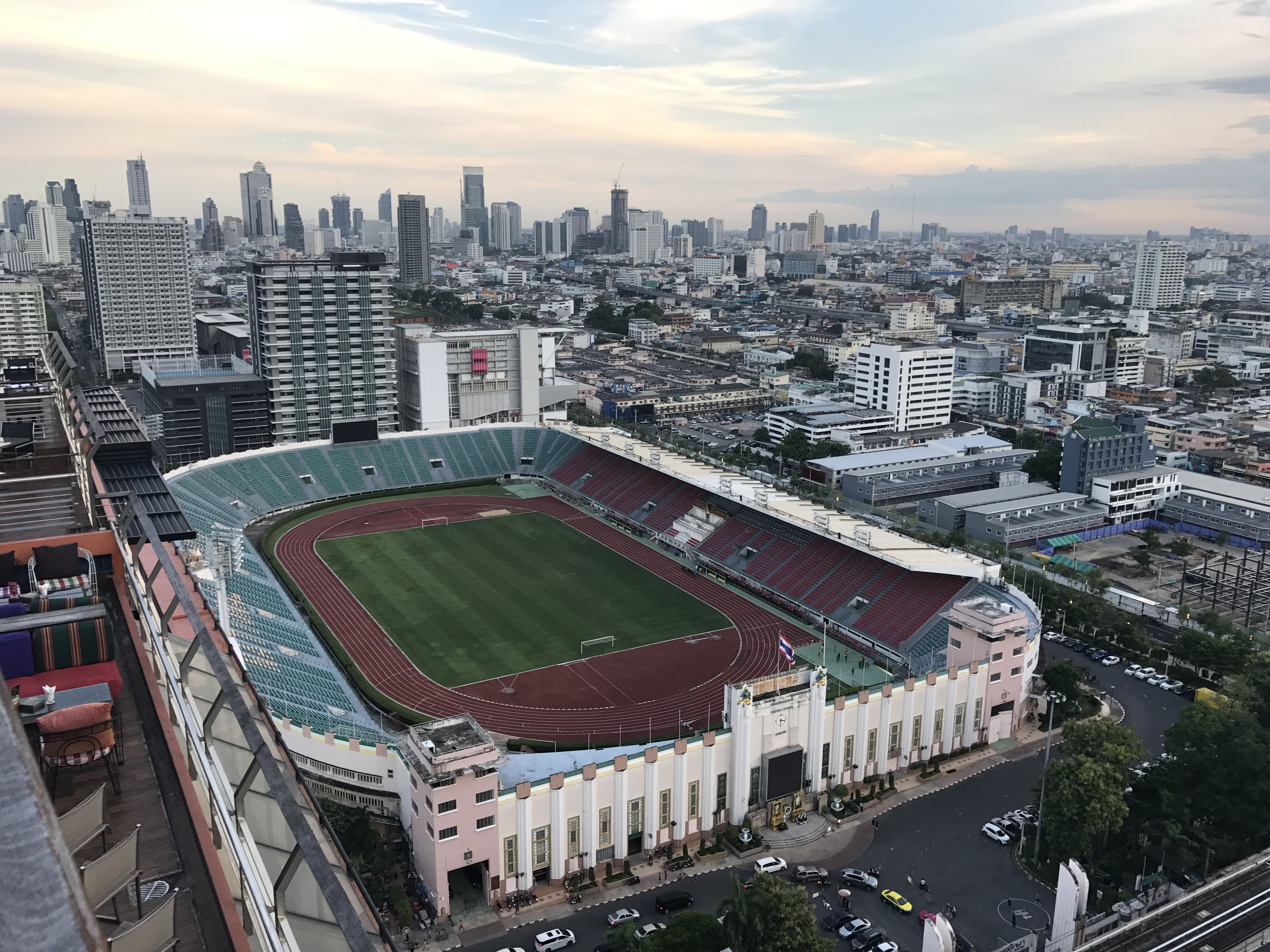
- The match took place at Supachalasai Stadium.
- Event: 2017 Thai League Cup
SCG Muangthong United	Chiangrai United
2	0
- Date: 22 November 2017
- Venue: Supachalasai Stadium, Bangkok
- Man of the Match: Teerasil Dangda
- Referee: Sivakorn Pu-udom (Thailand)
- Attendance: 16,788
- Weather: mostly cloudy 26 °C (79 °F) humidity 88%

The 2017 Thai League Cup final was the final match of the 2017 Thai League Cup, the 8th season in the second era of a Thailand's football tournament organised by Football Association of Thailand. It was played at the Supachalasai Stadium in Bangkok, Thailand on 22 November 2017, between SCG Muangthong United a big team from the metropolitan region and Chiangrai United a big team from the Northern part of Thailand.

== Road to the final ==
In their semi-finals, SCG Muangthong United beat BEC Tero Sasana 2–1 . In the same way, Chiangrai United beat Ratchaburi Mitr Phol 1–0 and qualified to the final.

SCG Muangthong United (T1)		Round	Chiangrai United (T1)	
Opponent	Result	Knockout 1 leg	Opponent	Result
Bangkok Glass (T1)	5–2 (H)	Round of 32	Trang (T3)	3–1 (A)
Bangkok United (T1)	2–1 (H)	Round of 16	Rayong (T2)	4–0 (A)
Buriram United (T1)	2–0 (A)	Quarter-finals	Ubon UMT United (T1)	4–1 (H)
BEC Tero Sasana (T1)	2–1 (N)	Semi-finals	Ratchaburi Mitr Phol (T1)	1–0 (N)

Note: In all results below, the score of the finalist is given first (H: home; A: away; T1: Clubs from Thai League; T2: Clubs from Thai League 2; T3: Clubs from Thai League 3.

== Match ==
=== Details ===
22 November 2017
19:00 UTC+7

SCG Muangthong United	2–0	Chiangrai United
Peerapat 35'; Teerasil 60'	Report; Highlight

Supachalasai Stadium, Bangkok
Attendance: 16,788
Referee: Sivakorn Pu-udom (Thailand)

SCG Muangthong United	Chiangrai United

Lineups:
GK	1	(Thailand) Kawin Thamsatchanan
DF	2	(Thailand) Peerapat Notchaiya	35'
DF	3	(Thailand) Theerathon Bunmathan
DF	5	(Japan) Naoaki Aoyama
DF	59	(Thailand) Nukoolkit Krutyai		(yellow card) 14'
MF	6	(Thailand) Sarach Yooyen		(yellow card) 67'	(substituted off) 80'
MF	15	(South Korea) Lee Ho
MF	34	(Thailand) Wattana Playnum
FW	7	(Brazil) Heberty Fernandes			(substituted off) 90+1'
FW	10	(Thailand) Teerasil Dangda (c)	61'
FW	11	(Thailand) Adisak Kraisorn			(substituted off) 72'
Substitutes:
GK	28	(Thailand) Prasit Padungchok
DF	33	(Thailand) Pitakpong Kulasuwan
MF	8	(Thailand) Thossawat Limwannasathian
MF	13	(Thailand) Ratchapol Nawanno			(substituted on) 80'
MF	16	(Thailand) Sanukran Thinjom
MF	21	(Thailand) Prakit Deeprom
MF	23	(Thailand) Charyl Chappuis			(substituted on) 72'
FW	77	(Brazil) Leandro Assumpção			(substituted on) 90+1'
FW	99	(Thailand) Siroch Chatthong
Head Coach:
(Thailand) Totchtawan Sripan

Lineups:
GK	1	(Thailand) Chatchai Budprom
DF	2	(Thailand) Atit Daosawang	(yellow card) 56'
DF	4	(Thailand) Piyaphon Phanichakul
DF	5	(Thailand) Pratum Chuthong (c)	(yellow card) 76'
DF	28	(Brazil) Everton Gonçalves	(yellow card) 51' (yellow-red card) 89'
DF	30	(Thailand) Suriya Singmui
MF	6	(Thailand) Phitiwat Sukjitthammakul	(yellow card) 90'
MF	8	(Thailand) Thitipan Puangchan		(substituted off) 75'
MF	21	(Thailand) Sivakorn Tiatrakul		(substituted off) 70'
FW	9	(Brazil) Rafael Coelho
FW	16	(Thailand) Akarawin Sawasdee		(substituted off) 84'
Substitutes:
GK	20	(Thailand) Nont Muangngam
DF	3	(Thailand) Krissadee Prakobkong
DF	22	(Thailand) Watcharin Nuengprakaew
DF	36	(Thailand) Shinnaphat Lee-Oh		(substituted on) 75'
MF	7	(Thailand) Chaiyawat Buran		(substituted on) 70'
MF	14	(Thailand) Pathompol Charoenrattanapirom		(substituted on) 84'
MF	27	(Thailand) Thanawich Kamna
FW	11	(Brazil) Felipe Azevedo
Head Coach:
(Brazil) Alexandre Gama

Assistant referees:
(Thailand) Apichit Nopuan
(Thailand) Rachan Dawangpa
Fourth official:
(Thailand) Mongkolchai Pechsri
Match Commissioner:
(Thailand) Aris Kulsawaspakdee
Referee Assessor:
(Thailand) Praew Seemarksuk

MATCH RULES

- 90 minutes.
- 30 minutes extra-time if necessary.
- Penalty shoot-out if still necessary.
- Maximum of three substitutions.

== Winner ==
2017 Thai League Cup
Winners
SCG Muangthong United
Second Title

=== Prizes for winner ===
- A champion trophy.
- 5,000,000 THB prize money.
- Qualification to 2017 Mekong Club Championship Final.

=== Prizes for runners-up ===
- 1,000,000 THB prize money.

== See also ==
- 2017 Thai League
- 2017 Thai League 2
- 2017 Thai League 3
- 2017 Thai League 4
- 2017 Thai FA Cup
- 2017 Thai League Cup
