= 2009 Thai Super Cup =

2009 Super Cup
Big Four Super Cup

Tournament details
- Host country: Thailand
- Dates: 22 December – 27 December
- Teams: 4
- Venue(s): 1 (in 1 host city)

Final positions
- Champions: Bangkok Glass (1st title)

Tournament statistics
- Matches played: 6
- Goals scored: 25 (4.17 per match)
- Top scorer(s): Hironori Saruta : 3 Wuttichai Tathong : 3

The top 4 ranked teams of 2009 will compete in a "Super Cup" competition starting on 22 December. The four teams will form a group and play matches in the Suphachalasai Stadium. The champion of the competition will receive 1,500,000 baht.

== 2009 Participants ==
- Muangthong United : 2009 Thai Premier League Champion
- Chonburi : 2009 Thai Premier League Runner Up
- Bangkok Glass : 2009 Thai Premier League 3rd Place
- BEC Tero Sasana : 2009 Thai Premier League 4th Place

== Prize money ==
- Champion : 600,000 Baht
- Runner-up : 400,000 Baht
- Third Place : 300,000 Baht
- Fourth Place : 200,000 Baht

== Standings ==
Team	Pld	W	D	L	GF	GA	GD	Pts
(Thailand) Bangkok Glass	3	3	0	0	9	5	+4	9
(Thailand) BEC Tero Sasana	3	2	0	1	7	6	+1	6
(Thailand) Chonburi	3	1	0	2	4	5	−1	3
(Thailand) Muangthong United	3	0	0	3	5	9	−4	0

== Results ==
22 December 2009
17.30 UTC+7

BEC Tero Sasana	2 – 3	Bangkok Glass
Prompong 81'; Wuttichai 90' (pen.)		Chatree 9'; Saruta 38'; Pichit 63' (o.g.)

Suphachalasai Stadium, Bangkok

22 December 2009
19.30 UTC+7

Muangthong United	1 – 2	Chonburi
Kaneung 64' (o.g.)		Suphasek 43', 52'

Suphachalasai Stadium, Bangkok

24 December 2009
17.30 UTC+7

BEC Tero Sasana	3 – 2	Muangthong United
Wuttichai 28'; Neto 54', 70'		Siaka 8'; Kouakou 52'

Suphachalasai Stadium, Bangkok

24 December 2009
19.30 UTC+7

Chonburi	1 – 2	Bangkok Glass
Ekaphan 69'		Ney Fabiano 57' (pen.); Nantawat 84'

Suphachalasai Stadium, Bangkok

27 December 2009
15.30 UTC+7

Chonburi	1 – 2	BEC Tero Sasana
Kaneung 34'		Noppol 51'; Wuttichai 65'

Suphachalasai Stadium, Bangkok

27 December 2009
17.30 UTC+7

Muangthong United	2 – 4	Bangkok Glass
Naruphol 15'; Yaya 56' (pen.)		Ajayi 71', 90+3'; Saruta 84', 87'

Suphachalasai Stadium, Bangkok

Thai Super Cup
2009 winners
Bangkok Glass
First title

== Annual awards ==
Goalkeeper of the Tournament

- (Thailand) Kritsana Klanklin - Bangkok Glass

Defender of the Tournament

- (Thailand) Cholratit Jantakam - Chonburi

Midfielder of the Tournament

- (Japan) Hironori Saruta - Bangkok Glass

Striker of the Tournament

- (Thailand) Wuttichai Tathong - BEC Tero Sasana
