= Suradech Thongchai =

Thai footballer (born 1987)

Personal information
- Full name: Suradech Thongchai
- Date of birth: 19 April 1987 (age 39)
- Place of birth: Kamphaeng Phet, Thailand
- Height: 1.65 m (5 ft 5 in)
- Position: Attacking midfielder

Team information
- Current team: North Bangkok University

Youth career
- 2008: Osotspa

Senior career*
Years	Team	Apps	(Gls)
2009–2013	Osotspa	78	(21)
2014	Bangkok Glass	18	(1)
2015	PTT Rayong	2	(1)
2015	Saraburi	16	(3)
2016–2017	Super Power Samut Prakan	33	(4)
2018–2019	Army United	26	(5)
2020–	North Bangkok University		
- * Club domestic league appearances and goals as of 00:57, 10 October 2017 (UTC)

Suradech Thongchai (Thai: สุรเดช ธงชัย, born April 19, 1987) is a Thai professional footballer.

== Honours ==
=== Club ===
Bangkok Glass F.C.

- Thai FA Cup winner (1) : 2014
