= Sarawut Konglarp =

Thai footballer

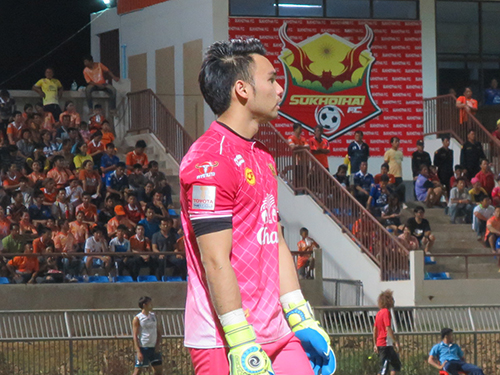

Personal information
- Full name: Sarawut Konglarp
- Date of birth: 30 October 1987 (age 39)
- Place of birth: Bangkok, Thailand
- Height: 1.80 m (5 ft 11 in)
- Position: Goalkeeper

Team information
- Current team: Rasisalai United
- Number: 35

Senior career*
Years	Team	Apps	(Gls)
2008–2009	Customs Department FC	45	(0)
2010	Bangkok United	20	(0)
2011–2012	TOT	24	(0)
2012–2013	Bangkok United	16	(0)
2014	Army United	37	(0)
2015–2016	Bangkok Glass	1	(0)
2015	→ Navy (loan)	16	(0)
2016	→ Sukhothai (loan)	18	(0)
2017	Chiangrai United	0	(0)
2017	→ Sisaket (loan)	14	(0)
2018–2019	Suphanburi	4	(0)
2020–2021	Lampang	8	(0)
2021–2022	MOF Customs United	31	(0)
2022	Pathumthani University	10	(0)
2023–2024	Chanthaburi	17	(0)
2024	Pattaya United	1	(0)
2024	Police Tero	2	(0)
2025–	Rasisalai United	3	(0)
- * Club domestic league appearances and goals as of 3 August 2024

Sarawut Konglarp (Thai: สราวุธ กองลาภ, born October 30, 1987), simply known as Arm (Thai: อาร์ม), is a Thai professional footballer who plays as a goalkeeper.
