= Amnaj Kaewkiew =

Thai footballer (born 1975)

Personal information
- Full name: Amnaj Kaewkiew
- Date of birth: 11 January 1975 (age 51)
- Place of birth: Phitsanulok, Thailand
- Height: 1.74 m (5 ft 8 1/2 in)
- Position: Defender

Youth career
- 1991–1993: Suankularb Wittayalai School
- 1994–1995: Krung Thai Bank

Senior career*
Years	Team	Apps	(Gls)
1996–2014	Bangkok Glass	231	(18)
2015	Rangsit	6	(0)
Total		237	(18)

Managerial career
- 2015: Rangsit
- 2016–2019: Bangkok Glass (assistant)
- 2018: Bangkok Glass (caretaker)
- 2020–2021: Chiangmai
- 2021–: BG Pathum United (assistant)
- * Club domestic league appearances and goals as of 14 June 2008

Amnaj Kaewkiew (Thai: อำนาจ แก้วเขียว) is a retired professional footballer from Thailand. He played for Bangkok Glass in the Thailand Premier League from 1996 to 2014. He captained the side in the 2008 AFC Champions League.

He is the currently assistant coach of Thai League 1 club BG Pathum United.

== Honours ==
Krung Thai Bank

- Thailand Premier League: Champion (2): 2003, 2004
- Queen's Cup: Runner-up (1): 2006

Bangkok Glass

- Singapore Cup Winner (1): 2010

Runner-up (1): 2009

- Thai FA Cup Runner-up (1): 2013
- Queen's Cup Winner (1): 2010
- Thai Super Cup Runner-up (1): 2009
