= Chalermkiat Boonnet =

Thai footballer (born 1989)

Personal information
- Full name: Chalermkiat Boonnet
- Date of birth: August 12, 1989 (age 37)
- Place of birth: Ubon Ratchathani, Thailand
- Height: 1.73 m (5 ft 8 in)
- Position: Defender

Team information
- Current team: Ubon Ratchathani
- Number: 28

Youth career
- Nakhonsawan Sport school
- Assumption Thonburi school

Senior career*
Years	Team	Apps	(Gls)
2008	Bangkok United	0	(0)
2009–2012	Bangkok	0	(0)
2013	Port	0	(0)
2014	Bangkok Glass	2	(0)
2015	→ Ubon UMT United (loan)	0	(0)
2016–	Ubon Ratchathani		
- * Club domestic league appearances and goals

Chalermkiat Boonnet (Thai: เฉลิมเกียรติ บุญเนตร, born August 12, 1989), commonly known as Tum or Top (Thai: ต๊อบ), is a That professional footballer who currently plays for Ubon Ratchathani in Thai League 3.

== Honours ==
Ubon UMT United

- Regional League Division 2:
  - Winners : 2015
