= Peter Läng =

Swiss-born Thai footballer (born 1986)

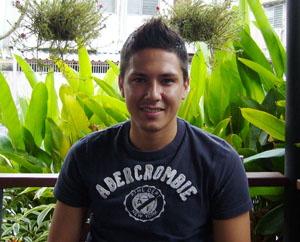
- Läng in 2011

Personal information
- Full name: Peter Läng
- Date of birth: 16 April 1986 (age 40)
- Place of birth: Zürich, Switzerland
- Height: 1.82 m (5 ft 11 1/2 in)
- Positions: Defensive midfielder; centre-back

Youth career
- 2001–2003: FC Winterthur
- 2004–2005: SC Freiburg
- 2005–2007: Basel

Senior career*
Years	Team	Apps	(Gls)
2007–2010	Schaffhausen	57	(4)
2010–2013	Bangkok Glass	51	(4)
2014	FC Bazenheid	4	(0)
2015–2016	FC Bazenheid	6	(0)
2016–2018	FC Wängi	1	(0)
Total		119	(8)

International career^{‡}
2007	Switzerland U21	1	(0)
2009	Thailand	5	(0)
- * Club domestic league appearances and goals as of 18 March 2010 ‡ National team caps and goals as of 18 November 2009

Peter Läng (Thai: ปีเตอร์ แลง, born 16 April 1986) is a former professional footballer. Born in Switzerland, he represented Thailand at international level.

== International career ==
Läng was called up to the full Thailand national side in coach Peter Reid's first squad announcement in the friendly match against Liverpool in July 2009.

=== International ===
As of 12 November 2015

Year	Apps	Goals
2009	5	0
Total	5	0

== Personal life ==
Läng was born in Zürich. His father is Swiss and his mother is Thai.

== Honours ==
Bangkok Glass

- Queen's Cup: 2010
- Singapore Cup: 2010
