= Surachai Jaturapattarapong =

Thai footballer and manager

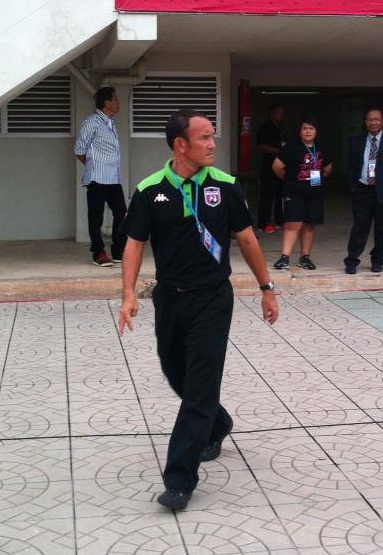

Personal information
- Full name: Surachai Jaturapattarapong
- Date of birth: 20 November 1969 (age 56)
- Place of birth: Bangkok, Thailand
- Height: 1.67 m (5 ft 5 1/2 in)
- Position: Attacking midfielder

Senior career*
Years	Team	Apps	(Gls)
1991–1997	Thai Farmers Bank FC	189	(32)
1998–2000	Stock Exchange of Thailand	70	(12)
2001–2002	Gombak United	32	(5)
2003–2005	Home United	80	(10)
Total		371	(59)

International career
1991–2002	Thailand	86	(7)

Managerial career
- 2009–2010: Bangkok Glass
- 2011–2013: Thailand (assistant)
- 2012: Bangkok Glass
- 2012–2014: Chainat Hornbill
- 2013: Thailand
- 2017: Bangkok Glass (caretaker)
- 2022: BG Pathum United (interim)
- 2024–2025: BG Pathum United
Medal record
Thailand national football team
Sea Games
Silver medal – second place	Sea Games 1991	Football
Gold medal – first place	Sea Games 1993	Football
Gold medal – first place	Sea Games 1995	Football
Gold medal – first place	Sea Games 1997	Football
Gold medal – first place	Sea Games 1999	Football
Asean Football Championship
Winner	Tiger Cup 1996	1996
Winner	Tiger Cup 2000	2000
Winner	Tiger Cup 2002	2002
- * Club domestic league appearances and goals

Surachai Jaturapattarapong (Thai: สุรชัย จตุรภัทรพงศ์) or the nickname "Nguan" (born November 20, 1969) is a Thai Football manager and former football player. who was most recently the head coach of Thai League 1 club BG Pathum United. He is a famous midfielder who scored 7 goals for the national team. He played for the national team between 1997-2001.

From 2017, Surachai works for Thai League 1 club BG Pathum United as their club director.

== Club career ==
From 1991 to 1996 Surachai played at the Thai Farmers Bank F.C. It was the most successful era of his active career. He won with a total of three club championships in 1994 and 1995 and the AFC Champions League. In 1998, he joined the club and went to the Stock Exchange of Thailand where he played until the end of 2000. He then moved to Singapore in the S League to Gombak United. The club withdrew from the league in 2002 and Surachai went back to Home United. There he played until 2005, rather he ended his club career.

== International career ==
His international career began already in the U-14 Thailand. About the U-16 and U-19, he made it to the seniors, where in 1991 he graduated from his first game. In the finals of the ASEAN Football Championship 2001 Surachai made his last game for the national team. On 23 February 2005, he was given a farewell by the Thai Football Association game. In this game a Thai Allstar selection ran against his last club Home United. The game was broadcast nationwide on television. The total revenue around the game, a total of 1.2 million baht went to Surachai. With the Thailand national football team, he won four gold medals at the Southeast Asian Games, and won three times in succession, the ASEAN Football Championship. He took 1992, 1996 and 2000 participated in the Asian Cup

== International goals ==
#	Date	Venue	Opponent	Score	Result	Competition
1.	December 4, 1995	Chiang Mai, Thailand	Indonesia	2-1	Won	1995 Southeast Asian Games
2.	December 4, 1995	Chiang Mai, Thailand	Indonesia	2-1	Won	1995 Southeast Asian Games
3.	July 7, 1996	Singapore	Myanmar	7-1	Won	1996 Asian Cup Qualification
4.	July 7, 1996	Singapore	Myanmar	7-1	Won	1996 Asian Cup Qualification
5.	November 21, 1998	Bangkok, Thailand	Turkmenistan	3-3	Drew	Friendly
6.	December 12, 1998	Bangkok, Thailand	Qatar	1-2	Lost	1998 Asian Games
7.	July 30, 1999	Bandar Seri Begawan, Brunei	Philippines	9-0	Won	1999 Southeast Asian Games

== Managerial statistics ==
As of 15 January 2025

Managerial record by team and tenure
Team	Nat.	From	To	Record					Ref.
Team	Nat.	From	To	G	W	D	L	Win %	Ref.
Bangkok Glass	(Thailand)	1 January 2009	30 November 2010	2	1	0	1	50.00	
Chainat Hornbill	(Thailand)	1 July 2012	30 June 2014	49	15	13	21	30.61	
Thailand (Caretaker)	(Thailand)	1 July 2013	31 December 2013	3	0	0	3	0.00	
Bangkok Glass	(Thailand)	10 July 2017	30 November 2017	13	4	4	5	30.77	
BG Pathum United (Interim)	(Thailand)	17 January 2022	19 February 2022	8	4	3	1	50.00	
BG Pathum United (Interim)	(Thailand)	25 December 2023	28 December 2023	1	0	1	0	0.00	
BG Pathum United	(Thailand)	8 October 2024	15 January 2025	12	5	4	3	41.67	
Career Total				88	29	25	34	32.95	

== Honours ==
=== As Player ===
==== Club ====
Thai Farmer Bank

- AFC Champions League: 1994, 1995
- Thai League T1: 1991, 1992, 1993, 1995
- Queen's Cup: 1994, 1995
- Afro-Asian Club Championship: 1994

Home United

- S.League: 2003
- Singapore Cup: 2003, 2005

=== International ===
Thailand

- Sea Games: 1993, 1995, 1997, 1999, Runner-Up: 1991
- ASEAN Football Championship: 1996, 2000, 2002
- Asian Games: 1998
- King's Cup: 1994, 2000

=== Individual ===
- Asian Club Championship Most Valuable Player: 1993–94
- S.League Player of the Year Award: 2004

=== As manager ===
==== Bangkok Glass ====
- Thai Super Cup: 2009
- Singapore Cup: 2009
- Queen's Cup: 2010

=== Individual ===
- Coach of the Year: 2020–21
