= Thai Super Cup =

- Organiser(s): Football Association of Thailand
- Founded: 2009
- Abolished: 2009
- Region: Thailand
- Teams: 4
- Last champions: Bangkok Glass (1st title)

The Thai Super Cup was a football cup competition among top football clubs in Thailand. It was initially launched in December 2009, featuring the top four teams of the 2009 Thai Premier League season, but only one edition occurred.

== Winners ==
Season	Winner
2009	Bangkok Glass

== All Time Winners ==
Club	Champions
Bangkok Glass	1 (2009)
