= Hironori Saruta =

Japanese footballer

Personal information
- Full name: Hironori Saruta
- Date of birth: October 28, 1982 (age 44)
- Place of birth: Ōtake, Hiroshima, Japan
- Height: 1.62 m (5 ft 4 in)
- Position: Forward

Youth career
- 2001–2004: Takushoku University

Senior career*
Years	Team	Apps	(Gls)
2005–2006	Ehime FC	28	(3)
2007	YKK AP	27	(4)
2008	Balestier Khalsa	15	(2)
2009	Sriracha	29	(5)
2010–2013	Bangkok Glass	120	(30)
2014–2015	Port	62	(6)
2016	Chiangrai United	27	(1)
2017	Udon Thani	20	(4)
Total		315	(55)
- * Club domestic league appearances and goals

Hironori Saruta (猿田 浩得, Saruta Hironori; born October 28, 1982) is a Japanese retired football player.

Saruta made 10 appearances in the J2 League with Ehime FC during 2006.

== Club statistics ==
Appearances and goals by club, season and competition
Club	Season	League			Emperor's Cup		Total	
Club	Season	Division	Apps	Goals	Apps	Goals	Apps	Goals
Ehime FC	2005	Football League	18	2	1	0	19	2
Ehime FC	2006	J2 League	10	1	0	0	10	1
YKK AP	2007	Football League	27	4	—		27	4
Total			55	7	1	0	56	7

== Honours ==
Bangkok Glass

- Singapore Cup Winner (1): 2010
- Thai FA Cup Runner-up (1): 2013
- Queen's Cup Winner (1): 2010
- Thai Super Cup Runner-up (1): 2009
