= Jetsada Puanakunmee =

Thai footballer (born 1982)

Personal information
- Full name: Jetsada Puanakunmee
- Date of birth: 15 February 1982 (age 44)
- Place of birth: Maha Sarakham, Thailand
- Height: 1.71 m (5 ft 7 1/2 in)
- Position: Midfielder

Youth career
- 1999–2000: Osotspa

Senior career*
Years	Team	Apps	(Gls)
2001–2016	Super Power Samut Prakan	206	(15)
2017	Deffo	14	(2)
Total		220	(17)

International career
2004	Thailand	2	(0)
- * Club domestic league appearances and goals as of April 13, 2010

Jetsada Puanakunmee (Thai: เจษฎา พั่วนะคุณมี, born February 15, 1982) is a Thai retired professional footballer who played as a midfielder.

Jetsada, a long-time player for Osotspa Football Club, is considered a legend of Thai League football. He joined the club's youth program in 1999 and remained with the team until its dissolution in 2016. His loyalty to Osotspa is an example of Thai footballers' dedication to a single club.
