= Suppasek Kaikaew =

Thai footballer (born 1986)

Personal information
- Full name: Suppasek Kaikaew
- Date of birth: 12 December 1986 (age 39)
- Place of birth: Ayutthaya, Thailand
- Height: 1.70 m (5 ft 7 in)
- Position: Attacking midfielder

Team information
- Current team: Pluakdaeng United
- Number: 11

Youth career
- 2000–2005: Chonburi

Senior career*
Years	Team	Apps	(Gls)
2006–2009	Bangkok United	71	(11)
2010–2011	Chonburi	13	(0)
2012	Wuachon United	5	(0)
2013–2016	Bangkok Glass	96	(13)
2017	Thai Honda Ladkrabang	25	(3)
2018	Suphanburi	5	(0)
2019	PTT Rayong	17	(0)
2020	Rayong	2	(0)
2020–2021	Rajpracha	13	(0)
2021–2022	Pattaya Dolphins United	13	(0)
2022	Samutsongkhram	8	(0)
2023	Sakon Nakhon	12	(1)
2023–	Pluakdaeng United	4	(1)

International career
2014	Thailand	1	(0)
- * Club domestic league appearances and goals as of 18 March 2023 (UTC)

Suppasek Kaikaew (Thai: ศุภเสกข์ ไก่แก้ว, born December 12, 1986), formerly Pakin Kaikaew or Ubon Kaikaew, is a Thai professional footballer who plays as an attacking midfielder for Pluakdaeng United.

== International career ==
In October 2014, Suppasek debuted for Thailand against China.

=== International ===
As of 12 November 2015

National team	Year	Apps	Goals
Thailand	2014	1	0
Thailand	Total	1	0

== Honours ==
=== Clubs ===
Chonburi

- Thai FA Cup: 2010

Bangkok Glass

- Thai FA Cup: 2014
