= Kritsana Klanklin =

Thai footballer

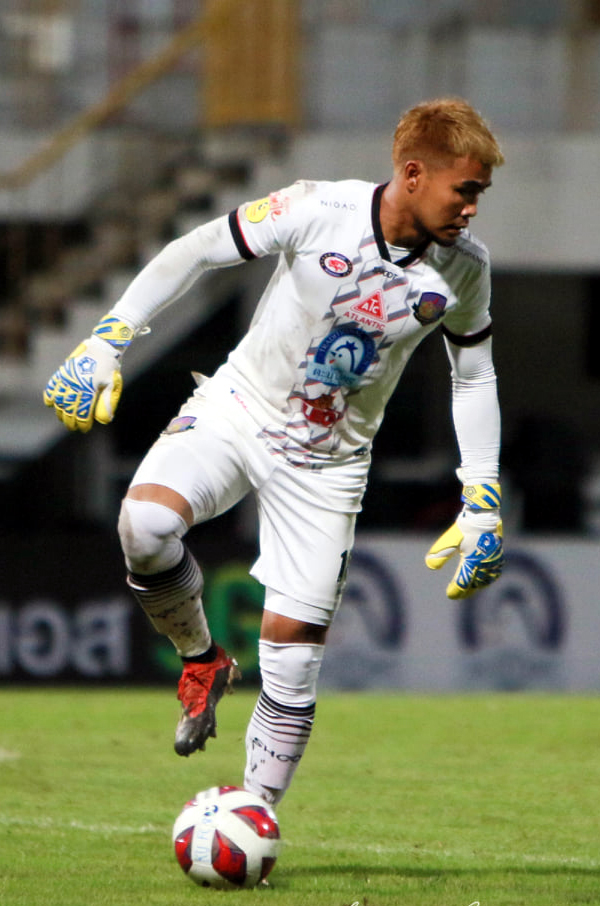
- Kritsana Klanklin playing for Kasetsart.

Personal information
- Full name: Kritsana Klanklin
- Date of birth: 26 February 1984 (age 42)
- Place of birth: Phitsanulok, Thailand
- Height: 1.75 m (5 ft 9 in)
- Position: Goalkeeper

Team information
- Current team: Kasetsart

Senior career*
Years	Team	Apps	(Gls)
2004	Customs United	29	(0)
2009–2014	Bangkok Glass	81	(0)
2014–2016	PTT Rayong	18	(0)
2017	Chiangmai	26	(0)
2018	Khon Kaen	16	(0)
2019–2021	Police Tero	22	(0)
2021-	Kasetsart	0	(0)
- * Club domestic league appearances and goals as of 4 July 2021

Kritsana Klanklin (Thai: กฤษณะ กลั่นกลิ่น; born 26 February 1984) is a Thai professional footballer who plays for Kasetsart in Thai League 2.

He played for Krung Thai Bank in the 2008 AFC Champions League group stages.

== Honours ==
=== Club ===
Bangkok Glass

- Singapore Cup Winner (1): 2010
