= 2014 Thai FA Cup =

Tournament details
- Country: Thailand
- Dates: 19 March 2014 – 9 November 2014
- Teams: 86

Final positions
- Champions: Bangkok Glass (1st title)
- Runner-up: Chonburi

Tournament statistics
- Matches played: 84
- Goals scored: 267 (3.18 per match)
- Top goal scorer(s): Anon Budpa; 7 goals

Awards
- Best player: Lazarus Kaimbi

The 2014 Thai FA Cup (Thai: มูลนิธิไทยคม เอฟเอคัพ) is the 21st season of Thailand knockout football competition. The tournament is organized by the Football Association of Thailand.

The cup winner is guaranteed a place in the 2015 AFC Champions League Play-off.

== Results ==
=== Preliminary round ===
The preliminary round consists of two rounds for teams currently playing in the Regional League Division 2 level. The first round was held on 19 March 2014.

==== First round ====
19 March 2014	Chamchuri United	1–2	Nakhon Nayok	Chulalongkorn University Sports Stadium, Bangkok

19 March 2014	Prachinburi United	2–1	Samut Prakan United	Prachinburi Stadium, Prachinburi

19 March 2014	Samut Sakhon	1–0	TWD United	Institute of Physical Education Samut Sakhon Campus Stadium, Samut Sakhon

19 March 2014	Port	1–4	Look Tapfa Pathum Thani

19 March 2014	Pattaya United	3–1	Phan Thong F.C.	Pattaya

19 March 2014	Ranong	4–5	Pathum Thani United	Ranong Stadium, Ranong

19 March 2014	Chanthaburi	3–1	Korona Muang Pattaya	Chanthaburi Stadium, Chanthaburi

==== Second round ====
23 April 2014	Lampang F.C.	0–3	Chiangmai F.C.

23 April 2014	Nakhon Ratchasima F.C.	3–1	Seeker F.C.

23 April 2014	Phuket F.C.	3–4	Ayutthaya F.C.

23 April 2014	Bangkok F.C.	6–0	Trang F.C.

23 April 2014	Khonkaen F.C.	2–1	BBCU F.C.

23 April 2014	Muangkan F.C.	1–1 (4–5 p)	TTM Customs F.C.

23 April 2014	RBAC F.C.	1–1 (3–4 p)	Ang Thong F.C.

23 April 2014	Saraburi F.C.	0–1	Siam Navy F.C.

23 April 2014	Sa Kaeo City F.C.	0–1	Nakhon Pathom United F.C.

23 April 2014	Sriracha F.C.	0–3	Trat F.C.

23 April 2014	Ratchaphruek College F.C.	1–2	Nakhon Nayok F.C.

23 April 2014	Thai Honda F.C.	6–2	Prachuap F.C.

==== Third round ====
21 May 2014	BEC Tero Sasana F.C.	1–2	Nakhon Ratchasima F.C.

21 May 2014	Chiangrai United F.C.	2–0	Army United F.C.

21 May 2014	Osotspa Saraburi F.C.	0–3	Muang Thong United F.C.

21 May 2014	Ratchaburi F.C.	5–3 (a.e.t.)	Chiangmai F.C.

21 May 2014	Police United F.C.	0–1	Chonburi F.C.

21 May 2014	TOT SC	2–1	Ayutthaya F.C.

21 May 2014	Siam Navy F.C.	2–3	Bangkok Glass F.C.

21 May 2014	Buriram United F.C.	2–1	Chainat F.C.

21 May 2014	Bangkok F.C.	2–0	Air Force Central F.C.

21 May 2014	Khonkaen F.C.	0–1	Bangkok United F.C.

21 May 2014	Nakhon Pathom United F.C.	0–1	Suphanburi F.C.

21 May 2014	PTT Rayong F.C.	3–2	Thai Honda F.C.

21 May 2014	TTM Customs F.C.	1–2	Samut Songkhram F.C.

21 May 2014	Sisaket F.C.	2–0	Ang Thong F.C.

21 May 2014	Songkhla United F.C.	0–0 (a.e.t.) (4–3 p)	Singhtarua F.C.

21 May 2014	Nakhon Nayok F.C.	1–1 (a.e.t.) (2–5 p)	Trat F.C.

==== Fourth round ====
9 July 2014	Buriram United F.C.	2–2 (a.e.t.) (3–5 p)	Bangkok Glass F.C.

9 July 2014	Bangkok F.C.	2–1	Songkhla United F.C.

9 July 2014	Suphanburi F.C.	2–0	Samut Songkhram F.C.

9 July 2014	Nakhon Ratchasima F.C.	1–2	Muang Thong United F.C.

9 July 2014	Chonburi F.C.	2–0	Ratchaburi F.C.

9 July 2014	Chiangrai United F.C.	2–1	Trat F.C.

9 July 2014	Bangkok United F.C.	2–1	Sisaket F.C.

9 July 2014	PTT Rayong F.C.	1–1 (a.e.t.) (2–4 p)	TOT SC

=== Quarterfinal ===
6 August 2014	Chiangrai United F.C.	1–0	Bangkok F.C.

6 August 2014	Bangkok Glass F.C.	2–1	Muang Thong United F.C.

6 August 2014	Suphanburi F.C.	2–1	Bangkok United F.C.

6 August 2014	TOT SC	1–6	Chonburi F.C.

=== Semifinal ===
4 October 2014	Bangkok Glass F.C.	1–1 (a.e.t.) (5–4 p)	Chiangrai United F.C.	Rajamangala Stadium
19:00	Lazarus Kaimbi 63'		Leandro Assumpção 81'
	Penalties
	Darko Tasevski (penalty scored); Lazarus Kaimbi (penalty scored); Goshi Okubo (penalty scored); Wasan Homsan (penalty scored); Pravinwat Boonyong (penalty scored)		(penalty scored) Renan Marques; (penalty scored) Fernando; (penalty scored) Pichitphong Choeichiu; (penalty scored) Yuttajak Kornchan; (penalty missed) Kiatprawut Saiwaeo

5 October 2014	Suphanburi F.C.	0–1	Chonburi F.C.	Rajamangala Stadium
			Mineiro 61'

=== Final ===
9 November 2014	Bangkok Glass	1–0	Chonburi F.C.	Supachalasai Stadium, Bangkok
18:15	Lazarus Kaimbi 81'

== See also ==
- 2014 Thai Premier League
- 2014 Thai Division 1 League
- 2014 Regional League Division 2
- 2014 Thai League Cup
- 2014 Kor Royal Cup
- Thai Premier League All-Star Football
