= Narit Taweekul =

Thai footballer (born 1983)

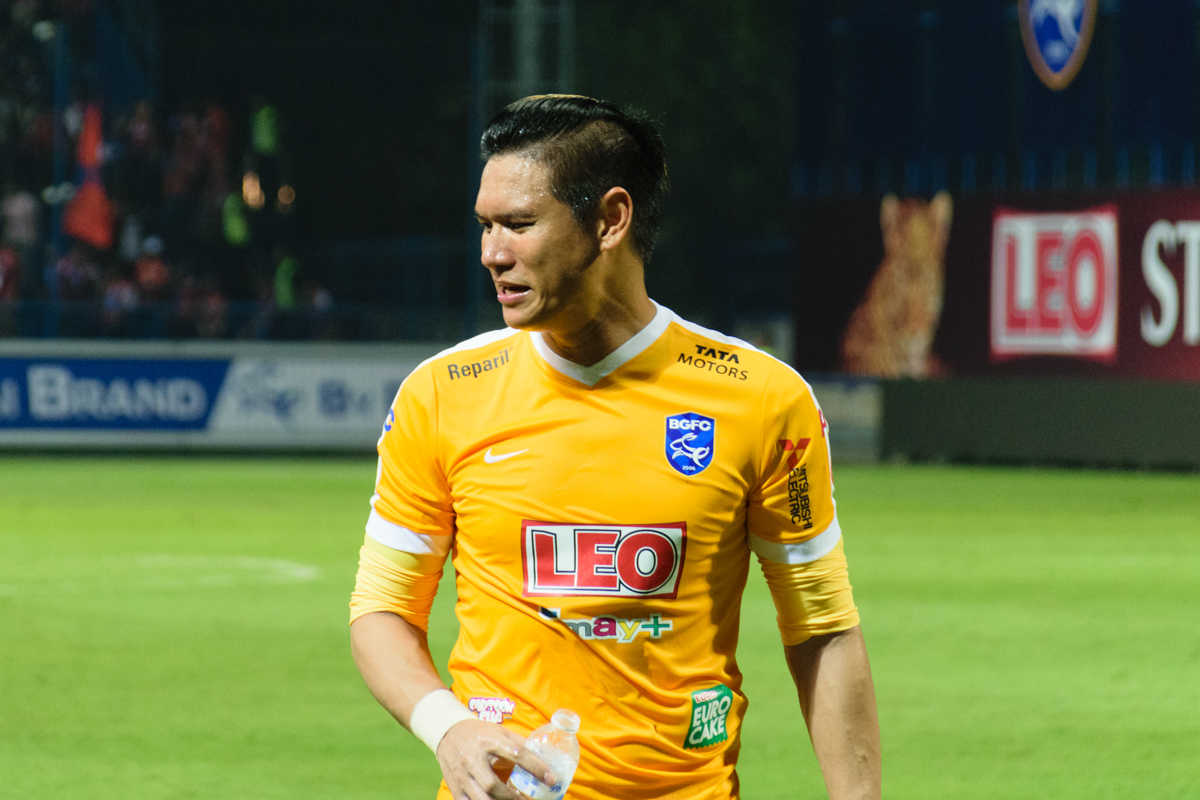

Personal information
- Full name: Narit Taweekul
- Date of birth: 30 October 1983 (age 43)
- Place of birth: Nakhon Phanom, Thailand
- Height: 1.81 m (5 ft 11 in)
- Position: Goalkeeper

Youth career
- 1999–2001: Debsirin School

Senior career*
Years	Team	Apps	(Gls)
2002–2005	Tobacco Monopoly	41	(0)
2006	BEC Tero Sasana	16	(0)
2007–2008	TTM Phichit	52	(0)
2009–2012	Pattaya United	98	(1)
2013–2019	BG Pathum United	152	(0)
2019	→ Chiangmai (loan)	9	(0)
2020–2021	Khon Kaen	31	(0)
2021–2022	Navy	7	(0)
Total		406	(1)

International career
2005–2006	Thailand U23	7	(0)
2004–2013	Thailand	3	(0)
Medal record
Thailand U23
Sea Games
Gold medal – first place	Sea Games 2005	Football
- * Club domestic league appearances and goals as of 06:44, 1 November 2018 (UTC)

Narit Taweekul (Thai: นริศ ทวีกุล, born October 30, 1983) is a Thai retired professional footballer who plays as a goalkeeper.

== International career ==
He started playing for the national side in 2004. In 2013 Narit was called up to the national team by Surachai Jaturapattarapong to the 2015 AFC Asian Cup qualification, after not playing for the national team for a while.

=== International ===
As of 12 November 2015

National team	Year	Apps	Goals
Thailand	2006	1	0
Thailand	2008	2	0
Thailand	Total	3	0

== Honours ==
=== Club ===
Tobacco Monopoly

- Thai Premier League: 2004-05

Bangkok Glass

- Thai FA Cup: 2014

=== International ===
Thailand U-23

- Sea Games Gold Medal; 2005

=== Individual ===
- Thai Premier League Player of the Month: July 2013
- Thai Premier League Goalkeeper of the Year: 2013
