= Goshi Okubo =

Japanese footballer

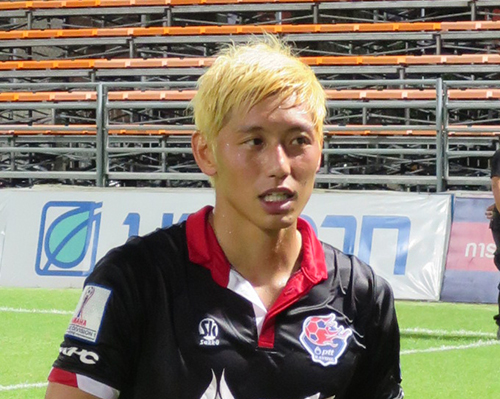

Personal information
- Full name: Goshi Okubo
- Date of birth: June 14, 1986 (age 40)
- Place of birth: Iwanuma, Miyagi, Japan
- Height: 1.71 m (5 ft 7 1/2 in)
- Position: Forward

Youth career
- 2002–2004: Vegalta Sendai

Senior career*
Years	Team	Apps	(Gls)
2005–2011	Vegalta Sendai	4	(0)
2008–2010	→Sony Sendai (loan)	72	(29)
2012–2013	Sony Sendai	47	(13)
2013	Montedio Yamagata	7	(2)
2014–2015	Bangkok Glass	50	(13)
2016–2018	PTT Rayong	34	(6)
2018	→Kyoto Sanga (loan)	0	(0)
2019	MOF Customs	12	(3)
2020	Navy	14	(0)
2020	Rayong	14	(5)
2021–2022	Navy	26	(4)
2022–2024	Bangkok	44	(5)
- * Club domestic league appearances and goals as of December 30, 2024

Goshi Okubo (大久保 剛志, Ōkubo Gōshi; born June 14, 1986) is a Japanese football player.

== Career statistics ==
Appearances and goals by club, season and competition
Club	Season	League			Emperor's Cup		J.League Cup		Total	
Club	Season	Division	Apps	Goals	Apps	Goals	Apps	Goals	Apps	Goals
Vegalta Sendai	2005	J2 League	4	0	1	0	-		5	0
Vegalta Sendai	2006	J2 League	0	0	0	0	-		0	0
Vegalta Sendai	2007	J2 League	0	0	1	0	-		1	0
Sony Sendai	2008	Football League	18	14	2	2	-		20	16
Sony Sendai	2009	Football League	24	8	2	1	-		26	9
Sony Sendai	2010	Football League	30	7	3	3	-		33	10
Vegalta Sendai	2011	J1 League	0	0	0	0	0	0	0	0
Sony Sendai	2012	Football League								
Career total			76	29	9	6	0	0	85	35
