= Lazarus Kaimbi =

Namibian footballer

Personal information
- Full name: Lazarus Kumbe Kaimbi
- Date of birth: 12 August 1988 (age 38)
- Place of birth: Windhoek, South-West Africa
- Height: 1.71 m (5 ft 7 1/2 in)
- Position: Striker

Senior career*
| Years | Team | Apps | (Gls) |
| 2006–2011 | Ramblers | 50 | (37) |
| 2011–2013 | Osotspa | 62 | (43) |
| 2013–2016 | BG Pathum United | 68 | (32) |
| 2016 | Chiangrai United | 19 | (8) |
| 2017 | Suphanburi | 26 | (14) |
| 2018 | Kelantan FA | 2 | (0) |
| 2019 | Pahang | 18 | (9) |
| 2020 | Kelantan FA | 28 | (16) |
| 2021 | PDRM | 18 | (12) |
| 2023 | Blue Waters | 17 | (5) |
| 2024– | African Stars | 0 | (0) |

International career^{‡}
| 2008–2014 | Namibia | 38 | (17) |
- * Club domestic league appearances and goals as of 03:24, 8 August 2018 (UTC) ‡ National team caps and goals as of 2018-10-15

Lazarus Kaimbi (born 12 August 1988) is a Namibian professional footballer who plays as a striker.

== Club career ==
Kaimbi joined South African club Jomo Cosmos from Ramblers F.C. of Namibia in November 2006.

On November 9, he scored the 3 goals in the 2014 Thai FA Cup final against Chonburi, to help Bangkok Glass to win their first ever Thai FA Cup trophy. This was considered a huge upset considering that Chonburi had just missed out on the League title and Bangkok Glass came into the match with the statistically worst defense in Thailand's top division.

In June 2018, Kaimbi signed with Malaysia Super League team Kelantan, and made his debut on 5 June in a league match against Kedah.He leaves Kelantan FC in the end of season of 2020.

== International career ==
As a member of the Namibia national football team, Kaimbi competed with the team at the 2008 Africa Cup of Nations. He scored twice in Namibia's win over Djibouti in the first round of African qualification for the 2014 FIFA World Cup in November 2011.

=== International goals ===
Scores and results list Namibia's goal tally first.

| # | Date | Venue | Opponent | Score | Result | Competition |
|---|---|---|---|---|---|---|
| 1. | 20 July 2008 | Lilian Ngoyi Stadium, Secunda, South Africa | Comoros | 1–0 | 3–0 | 2008 COSAFA Cup qualification |
| 2. | 24 July 2008 | Lilian Ngoyi Stadium, Secunda, South Africa | Malawi | 1–0 | 1–0 | 2008 COSAFA Cup qualification |
| 3. | 11 November 2011 | El Hadj Hassan Gouled Aptidon Stadium, Djibouti City, Djibouti | Djibouti | 2–0 | 4–0 | 2014 FIFA World Cup qualification |
| 4. | 15 November 2011 | Sam Nujoma Stadium, Windhoek, Namibia | Djibouti | 2–0 | 4–0 | 2014 FIFA World Cup qualification |
| 5. | 15 November 2011 | Sam Nujoma Stadium, Windhoek, Namibia | Djibouti | 3–0 | 4–0 | 2014 FIFA World Cup qualification |

== Honours ==
Bangkok Glass

- Thai FA Cup

Winner(1) : 2014

Runner-up (1): 2013
