= BG Pathum United F.C. =

Thai football club, based in Pathum Thani

BG Pathum United บีจี ปทุม ยูไนเต็ด
- Full name: BG Pathum United Football Club สโมสรฟุตบอลบีจี ปทุม ยูไนเต็ด
- Nicknames: The Rabbits (เดอะ แรบบิทส์)
- Short name: BGPU
- Founded: 1979; 47 years ago, as Bangkok Glass; 2018; 8 years ago, as BG Pathum United
- Ground: True BG Stadium; Pathum Thani, Thailand
- Capacity: 14,814
- Owner: Bangkok Glass PCL
- Chairman: Supasin Leelarit
- Head coach: Peerapong Pichitchotirat
- League: Thai League 1
- 2025–26: Thai League 1, 4th of 16
- Website: bgputd.com
Home colours	Away colours

BG Pathum United Football Club (Thai: สโมสรฟุตบอลบีจี ปทุม ยูไนเต็ด) is a Thai professional football club based in Pathum Thani province and is managed by BG Sports Company Limited which is a subsidiary of Bangkok Glass Public Company Limited. BG Pathum United participates in the Thai League 1.

The nickname of BGPU, "The Rabbits", derives from the chinese zodiac of the first club president, Pavin Bhirombhakdi who was born in The Year of the Rabbit.

The club has won 1 Thai League 1 title, 1 Thai League 2 title, 1 Thai FA Cup, 1 Thai League Cup and 2 Thailand Champions Cup in their history.

== History ==
=== Origins of the club and early history (1979–2008) ===
Bangkok Glass Football Club traces its origins to 1979, following the establishment of the Bangkok Glass Factory. Initially, the team was formed for internal matches among factory employees. In 1989, the club began participating in external competitions, particularly tournaments among industrial factories in Pathum Thani province, where it gradually gained wider local recognition.

In 1999, the employees and management formally organized the team into a more structured football club. After improving its facilities, equipment, and stadium, Bangkok Glass Football Club was officially founded in April 2006. Player recruitment began the following month, and the club registered as a member of the Football Association of Thailand later that year.

The club’s first official competition was the Ngor Royal Cup in the 2007–08 season, where Bangkok Glass finished as runners-up, losing 1–0 to Khukhot Municipal in the final. This performance earned the club promotion to compete in the higher-tier King’s Cup the following year.

In 2008, BGFC Sport Company Limited was established to professionally manage the club in accordance with AFC regulations. That same period, the team competed in the 2008–09 Khor Royal Cup and reached the final, where they were defeated 2–1 by JW Group. Nevertheless, the club secured promotion to the Khǒr Royal Cup. In addition to football, Bangkok Glass also operated a futsal team, which competed in the Futsal Thailand League.

=== Takeover of "Krung Thai Bank" and first year in the top flight (2009) ===
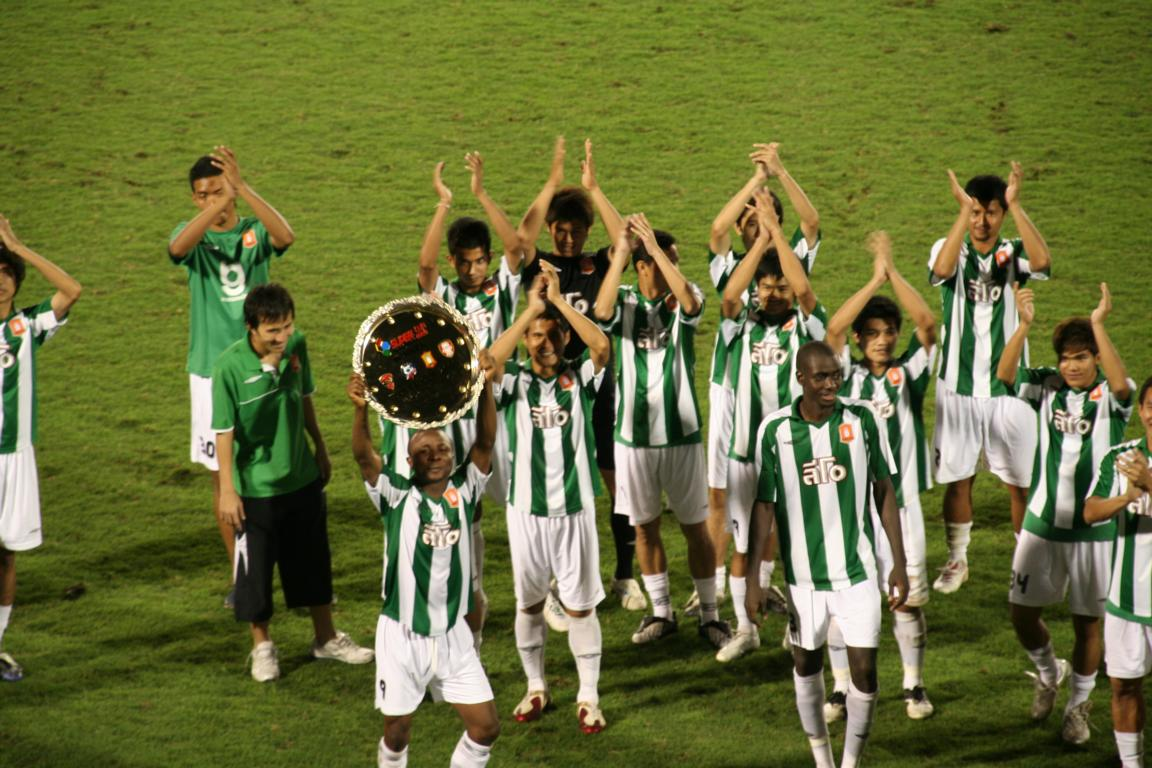
Bangkok Glass winning the Thai Super Cup in 2009

In January 2009, Krung Thai Bank, a club from the Thailand Premier League, announced its dissolution after failing to meet the Asian Football Confederation (AFC) requirement to register as a juristic entity. As a result, Bangkok Glass, then competing in the Football B (Khor B) Royal Cup, took over the league position and assets of Krung Thai Bank and entered the Thai Premier League in its place.

During this transition period, Bangkok Glass temporarily used Queen Sirikit's 60th Anniversary Stadium as their home ground while the club home ground, the Leo Stadium was undergoing renovation. In their debut top-flight season in the 2009 season, the club performed strongly, finishing third in the Thai Premier League. Meanwhile, the original team formed by the company’s employees and management in 1999 continued to compete separately under the name Rangsit.

=== The club's growth (2010–2016) ===
In 2010, Bangkok Glass was highly popular and Leo Stadium was completed after a major renovation, they returned to play on this field again after updating for almost 1 year. in January, Bangkok Glass sent the team to compete in the Queen's Cup and won the championship by defeating Police United 4–1. In that same year, they sent the team to compete in Singapore Cup, in the second year, they succeed by winning the 2010 Singapore Cup.

Head coach Supasin Leelarit and Surachai Jaturapattarapong was re-appointed as head coach at the end of the 2011 season. After a disappointing season, Surachai stepped down again from his post October 2012 and was replaced by Englishmen Phil Stubbins as head coach. The club finished the season a disappointing 8th place in the 2012 season. Phil Stubbins stepped down in March 2013 after a disappointing season where he was replaced by a caretaker coach Anurak Srikerd.

Bangkok Glass than announced its new head coach for midway of the 2013 Thai Premier League, Attaphol Buspakom, one of Thailand's most respected and successful coaches with an AFC Champions League runners-up in 2003 with BEC Tero Sasana and two Thai League 1 titles with Muangthong United in 2009 and Buriram United in 2011. Attaphol completely changed the club football philosophy from a very direct long balls, style of play to more possession, more short passes. The team became runners-up in the 2013 Thai FA cup for the first time of club history, defeated by Buriram United 3–1 at Thammasat Stadium in the final and finishing fifth in the league. With Attaphol Buspakom, his time at the club ended when his team were defeated 1–2 by Port midway of the 2014 season, when he resigned and was replace by Anurak Srikerd.

==== First major honours ====

2014 Thai FA Cup Final starting lineup Bangkok Glass 1 – 0 Chonburi

In 2014, assistant coach Anurak Srikerd was promoted to head coach where he went on to win the 2014 Thai FA Cup where Lazarus Kaimbi scored the only goal in the final to secure the club first ever major honours in history.

Australian Aurelio Vidmar became the eleventh permanent head coach of Bangkok Glass when his tenure was officially announced on 1 August 2016. He than guided Bangkok Glass to play modern possession football philosophy and challenging for the top 3 spot for a short period in the 2016 season, their best finish since 2009.

In 2015, Bangkok Glass handed Buriram United their only 2017 league defeat on 3 May. The team managed to end their season by finishing fifth in the Thai League 1 with injuries at different times to key player of club – Thailand national team winger Sarawut Masuk, Ariel Rodriguez, Daniel Toti and the team's captain Matt Smith. With Vidmar, his time at the club ended when his team won Navy 3–0, in the Thai League 2017 matchday 22. The team was giving a farewell party for Vidmar and took care of him feels like family.

=== Relegation, comeback, and route to first Thai League 1 Title (2017–2021) ===
In November 2017, Bangkok Glass appointed Spanish Josep Ferré as the club's head coach.

In 2018, Bangkok Glass changed the symbol and the color of the new club and improved the Leo Stadiums fields by using real grass. In March, The Rabbits were in danger of relegation,

In the last match of the Thai League season 2018, the association announced that there would be 5 relegated teams. Bangkok Glass lost to Nakhon Ratchasima Mazda while the other two teams hoped to escape from the relegation, such as Sukhothai and Chainat Hornbill but they won. Resulting in Chainat Hornbill and Bangkok Glass having the same score of 42 points but Chainat Hornbill had better stats making Bangkok Glass became the last team to be relegated by being ranked 14th caused to relegation to kick in the Thai League 2 seasons later. It is the first time of the club has been in the past 10 years since the acquisition of Krung Thai Bank Club in 2009.

==== Thai League 2 and Thai League 1 champions (2018–2021) ====

BG Pathum United usual line-up in their 2020–21 Thai League 1 winning season

After relegation to Thai League 2 in 2018, Bangkok Glass changed its name to BG Pathum United to be one of the supporters of the club in Pathum Thani Province. The club will donned the new name in the 2019 Thai League 2 season. In 2019, BG Pathum United won the Thai League 2 title, earning promotion back to the top tier. The season after in the 2020–21 Thai League 1 season, BG Pathum United took the lead as league leaders of the Thai League on Day 7 and never looked back. Despite the league suspension due to the COVID-19 pandemic, the team maintained their form and did not lose a game on their way to their first-ever Thai League 1 title.

2018	Thai League 1	(Tier 1)
2019	Thai League 2	(Tier 2)
2020	Thai League 1	(Tier 1)

Moreover, the Thai advanced playmaker, Sumanya Purisai received most valuable player at the end of the year. Sumanya Purisai, Andrés Túñez, Victor Cardozo, and Chatchai Budprom were all selected in the Thai League Best XI

BG Pathum United held their title celebration party on 20 March 2021 when they beat Ratchaburi 2–0 on the club's final home game of the season. Dusit Chalermsan and his team could not record an undefeated title run when they lost 1–0 to Muangthong United at the Thunderdome Stadium.

==== Aurelio Vidmar's return and AFC Champions League foray (2021) ====
On 30 May 2021, BG Pathum United announced the return of Aurelio Vidmar for his second spell as the Rabbits' head coach. Vidmar replaces Dusit Chalermsan who attended the “AFC” A Certificate Coaching Course, sponsored by the club. Vidmar's second debut as head coach of BG Pathum United came in the 2021 AFC Champions League Group Stage opener against Kaya F.C.–Iloilo, where BG Pathum United beat the Philippines Football League club 4–1 thanks to a brace each from Teerasil Dangda and Diogo Luís Santo – with Teerasil going down in the history book as BG Pathum United's first goalscorer in the final round of the AFC Champions League.

=== 2021 AFC Champions League – Group F ===
Pos	Team	Pld	W	D	L	GF	GA	GD	Pts	Qualification	ULS	PAT	VIE	KAY
1	(South Korea) Ulsan Hyundai	6	6	0	0	13	1	+12	18	Advance to Round of 16	—	2–0	3–0	2–1
2	(Thailand) BG Pathum United (H)	6	4	0	2	10	6	+4	12	Advance to Round of 16	0–2	—	2–0	4–1
3	(Vietnam) Viettel	6	2	0	4	7	9	−2	6		0–1	1–3	—	1–0
4	(Philippines) Kaya–Iloilo	6	0	0	6	2	16	−14	0		0–3	0–1	0–5	—

Source: AFC
(H) Hosts

Aurelio Vidmar's BG Pathum United, who hosted all of Group F's matches, qualified for the knockout round of the 2021 AFC Champions League as one of the three best runners-up and second-place behind 2020 AFC Champions League champions Ulsan Hyundai in Group F. This marks the club's first foray into the Round of 16 in the AFC Champions League. “We're very pleased with our progression into the Round of 16,” said Vidmar after securing BG Pathum United the ticket to the Round of 16. “I've said earlier that this is probably one of the hardest groups, and it goes to show that in the two games we lost to Ulsan, there wasn't a lot of difference. It showed that we can certainly match the best, and I'm proud of the performance the players put in tonight."

Vidmar followed up his success in the 2021 AFC Champions League by beating Chiangrai United. to lift the 2021 Thailand Champions Cup trophy on 1 September 2021. Midfielder Chaowat Veerachat came off the bench to set up fellow substitute Ryo Matsumura for the match-winner in the 87th minute. This is BG Pathum United's first Thailand Champions Cup trophy.

An away draw at Chonburi. and a home win over Ratchaburi in the 2021–22 Thai League 1 followed before the team returned to the 2021 AFC Champions League action against Jeonbuk Hyundai Motors at Jeonju World Cup Stadium. Without Vidmar on the touchline for personal reasons, BG Pathum United produced a spirited performance and managed to draw with Jeonbuk 1–1 in normal time. The game reached the penalty shootout where BG Pathum United was beaten 4–2.

After exiting the 2021 Thailand Champions Cup, BG Pathum United shifted their focus back onto the league and went on an 8-match unbeaten run across all competitions, drew once, and won 7, between mid-October and mid-November 2021. The club sat third on the 2021–22 Thai League 1 table after matchday 13 and only 3 points behind league leaders and rivals, Bangkok United.

==== Return of Dusit Chalermsan (2021) ====
On 15 November 2021, BG Pathum United announced that the club has parted ways with Vidmar after 7 months. The breakup is speculated to be the effect of Dusit Chalermsan's announcement to join the club as team manager on the eve of 14 November 2021.

Dusit filled in as head coach after Vidmar's departure but failed to get off to a positive start in his second tenure in charge – losing two away games at the hands of Nongbua Pitchaya and Port F.C., respectively. Dusit guided BG Pathum United to the next round in both domestic cup competitions but could only pick up 3 draws in his next 3 league games.

On 17 January 2022, Surachai Jaturapattarapong, the club's Director of Football, replaced Dusit as caretaker head coach following Dusit's disappointing league result that produces zero wins in 5 matches during his second spell at the helm.

=== The rebuilding project (2022–present) ===
==== Makoto Teguramori Era (2022) ====
On 27 January 2022, Makoto Teguramori was announced as the new BG Pathum United head coach. The former-Japan national under-23 football team became the first Asian head coach of the club. Joining him as the assistant head coach was Ryo Shigaki and fitness coach Chang Yeob Yi.

Teguramori's reign began with a 2–0 away victory over Suphanburi on matchday 22. Apart from the 2021–22 Thai League Cup Quarter-Finals defeat to Chiangrai United, Teguramori's brilliant start to life in Pathum Thani yielded 6 league wins from his first 7 matches. Noticeable results from those early matches are the 0–1 triumph at the Thunder Castle courtesy of Sarach Yooyen's winner – later voted as the REVO Thai League: Goal of the Year 2021/22 at the FA Awards 2022 or the 7–2 thrashing of Prachuap FC that set the record for the highest scoring game of the campaign.

BG Pathum United wrapped up the 2021–22 Thai League 1 by beating Chonburi 4–1 in what was to become Peerapong Pichitchotirat's farewell match.

The team made multiple changes to the playing squad and spent the pre-season training camp in Hua Hin. 2022–23 Thai League 1 began with BG Pathum United winning the 2022 Thailand Champions Cup, this time beating Buriram United 2–3, and becoming the first club in 4 years to hold on to this title consecutively.

==== History in the AFC Champions League ====
BG Pathum United took a break from domestic competition in mid-April to take part in the 2022 AFC Champions League – with the club receiving the honor to host the Group Stage for the second consecutive edition. BG Pathum United went on to top Group G, made up of Australian club Melbourne City, Korean club Jeonnam Dragons, and Philippines club United City where they went on to top the group stage and advanced to the round of 16 for the second successive season.

=== 2022 AFC Champions League – Group G ===
Pos	Team	Pld	W	D	L	GF	GA	GD	Pts	Qualification	BGP	MCY	JND	UCT
1	(Thailand) BG Pathum United (H)	6	3	3	0	11	2	+9	12	Advance to Round of 16	—	1–1	0–0	5–0
2	(Australia) Melbourne City	6	3	3	0	10	3	+7	12		0–0	—	2–1	3–0
3	(South Korea) Jeonnam Dragons	6	2	2	2	5	5	0	8		0–2	1–1	—	2–0
4	(Philippines) United City	6	0	0	6	1	17	−16	0		1–3	0–3	0–1	—

Source: AFC
(H) Hosts

2022 AFC Champions League Quarter-finals – Urawa Red Diamonds 4–0 BG Pathum United

Once again, BG Pathum United had to put the domestic competition on hold in order to continue their 2022 AFC Champions League knockout stage fixtures flying off to Saitama, Japan. On 19 August 2022, the club face Kitchee SC of Hong Kong at the Urawa Komaba Stadium and was easily blown away 4–0 in which Worachit Kanitsribumphen and Ikhsan Fandi put BG Pathum United two goals ahead at half-time. After the break, Teerasil Dangda added the third before substitute Chatmongkol Tongkiri complete the scoring 3 minutes from time. Goals from Ikhsan Fandi and Chatmongkol Tongkiri were also nominated for #ACL2022 (East) – Best Goals of the Knockout Stage.

BG Pathum United became the first Thai club since 2013 to reach the quarter-finals of the AFC Champions League. Waiting in the next round is Urawa Red Diamonds, led by BG Pathum United's former head coach Ricardo Rodríguez.

On 22 August 2022, BG Pathum United took on the then-four-time semi-finals Urawa Red Diamonds at the Saitama Stadium 2002. Despite the player's best efforts, Urawa Red Diamonds were too strong as they ran out 4–0 winners thanks to a goal each from David Moberg Karlsson, Takuya Iwanami, Yosho Koizumi, and Takahiro Akimoto.

"We told our players they should keep their heads up and use this experience as a way to improve ourselves so that we can match the best football clubs in Asia," said Teguramori in the post-match press conference.

"We realise this match is one of the most historic moments for the club, so this 4–0 defeat is something that has given us a wake-up call."

BG Pathum United returned from Japan and jumped right into the 2022–23 Thai League 1 season. In the first 10 league games of the season, Teguramori won all 5 matches at BG Stadium, but it was away from home that things seems tricky for Teguramori. Defeat to Chonburi on opening day, separated by away draws against Buriram United and PT Prachuap, followed by a shock defeat at Nongbua Pitchaya meant BG Pathum United trailed 6 points behind league leaders, and title rivals, Buriram united after matchday 9.

A 2–0 defeat by Aurelio Vidmar's Bangkok United at Thammasat Stadium in the "Pathum Thani Derby" means 0 away wins from 5 attempts in the opening 10 games for BG Pathum United.

==== Matt Smith era (2022) ====
24 October 2022, BG Pathum United announced that the club has parted ways with Makoto Teguramori. Assistant coach, Mitsuo Kato, is handed the interim head coach responsibility. Mitsuo Kato's one and only game at the helm was the 2–2 home draw against Lampang on 29 October 2022. That same evening, Matthew Smith was unveiled as the new head coach. The Australian defender, who held the record as BG Pathum United's first foreign player to surpass the 114-appearance milestone, began his time as head coach in style by beating Kasem Bundit University 3–0 in the 2022–23 Thai FA Cup second round. That cup victory was followed by a 4–0 thumping over Nakhon Ratchasima – the team's first three-point away from home of the season.

Lampang was swatted away 7–1 in round three of the 2022–23 Thai FA Cup to cap off Smith's first 7 matches with 5 wins in all competitions. The Thai domestic season took a break during the new year and the 2022 AFF Championship. In this January transfer window, coinciding with the Thai League mid-season break, BG Pathum United undergoes massive squad changes that saw a total of 12 players exit the club, both on loan and permanently. Traveling in the opposite are 10 new arrivals in the playing squad to boost the rebuilding of the new team. Smith suffered defeat to Port FC at PAT Stadium on second leg opening day which started a 4-match winless run in the league. BG Pathum United's form did not improve as they suffered another 4-match winless run at began in late February until March.

19 March 2023, 30 minutes after losing to Bangkok United, the club dropped the announcement that Matthew Smith has been relieved from the head coach role and reassigned as the club's technical director. Assistant coach, Supachai Komsilp, is handed the interim head coach job. On 8 May 2023, Thongchai Sukkoki was appointed as BG Pathum United's fifth head coach of the season. Thongchai's debut match ended with a home win over Chonburi, followed by a defeat to Buriram United in the 2022–23 Thai League Cup final. BG Pathum United took part in the 2022 J.League Asia Challenge where they would face Kawasaki Frontale in a 3–1 loss.

==== Makoto Teguramori second stint (2023–2024) ====
BG Pathum United started off the 2023–24 Thai League 1 season well, drawing 2–2 to Police Tero on matchday 1 on 11 August 2023, and went on to draw 0–0 at home against PT Prachuap on 18 August 2023. The club then flies off to Shanghai to face Shanghai Port on 22 August 2023 in the 2023–24 AFC Champions League qualifying play-offs when in the 12-minute, Uzbekistan striker, Igor Sergeyev opened up the account to lead the match 1–0 before scoring his second goal in the 26th minute and eventually scoring a hat-trick in the 61st minute to send BG Pathum United through to the 2023–24 AFC Champions League group stage in a 2–3 away win at the Pudong Football Stadium. On 16 June 2024, BG Pathum United won their first Thai League Cup where Teerasil Dangda scored in the 90+8th stoppage time to secure the only goal in the match against Muangthong United to win the cup.

BG Pathum United then participate in the recently revived tournament, the 2024–25 ASEAN Club Championship being placed alongside Indonesian club PSM Makassar, Vietnamese club Đông Á Thanh Hóa, Malaysian club Terengganu, Cambodian club Preah Khan Reach Svay Rieng and Myanmar Shan United. BG Pathum United will play their first match of the tournament at the Batakan Stadium in Balikpapan against PSM Makassar on 21 August 2024 where both team contested in a goalless draw. BG Pathum United went on to top the group with 3 wins, 2 draw and 0 lost which sees them advance to the semi-finals against domestic rivals, Buriram United. In January 2025, BG Pathum United was invited by Football Association of Singapore (FAS) to participate in the 2024–25 Singapore Cup which the club last played in the cup in 2010. BG Pathum United then face off against Tanjong Pagar United winning them 2–1 at the Jurong East Stadium. On 17 June 2025, BG Pathum United bid farewell to Teerasil Dangda after contract expiry.

BG Pathum United then qualified to the 2025–26 AFC Champions League Two where they were drawn in Group H alongside Korean club Pohang Steelers, Filipino club Kaya–Iloilo and Singaporean club Tampines Rovers. However, the club finished bottom of the group stage thus bowing out from the tournament. BG Pathum United also played in the 2025–26 ASEAN Club Championship but finished third in the group stage. BG Pathum United then finished the league campaign in fourth place.

BG Pathum United were drawn in Group F of the 2026–27 AFC Champions League Two, alongside Australian club Adelaide United, Singaporean side Lion City Sailors and Hong Kong Premier League club Tai Po.

== Academy development ==
In 2009, Bangkok Glass opened its first youth academies, football clinic, every Saturday and Sunday. Under the direction of Hans Emser, the BGFC academy is recognized as one of the best in the country. They were prepared, trained, and selected youth players who have the potential to be a part of the first team of the club.

In 2012, Bangkok Glass signed a partnership agreement with Assumption College of Assumption Campus Rama 2 to be part of supporting football players and personnel of the school to have more knowledge in football and also developed young players who had the potential and ability to be a part of the Bangkok Glass players in the future.

In the same year, Bangkok Glass did support Siam Bangkok Glass (Rangsit) to compete in the Thai Royal Cup football match Khǒr Royal Cup until winning the Royal Cup and was promoted to play Regional football league, Bangkok and metropolitan area. The club has the policy to give the team Rangsit FC is the birth stage of the club youth footballers. It was creating opportunities, practicing, and learning to be a professional player before getting a chance to play in Bangkok Glass Football Club next.

In 2013, Bangkok Glass was a 2-year partnership with Thonburi University together to make a team Thonburi – BG United club, sent the team to compete in the regional football league, central and western zone, had Sathit Bensoh as the head coach and Bangkok Glass Club youth football players joined the team.

In 2015, Bangkok Glass joined AFC Champions League for the first time. After a successful decade, Bangkok Glass established Yamaoka Hanasaka Academy in collaboration with Cerezo Osaka and Yanmar for developing young footballers to become professional footballers. which is located at Klong 4 Rangsit, Pathum thani. Currently is welcoming youth to practice in the academy, U-12, U-15, and U-18.

On 6 December 2022, former Singaporean defender, Kadir Yahaya signed a two-year contract as the head of youth football at the club.

== Team image ==
=== Club crest ===
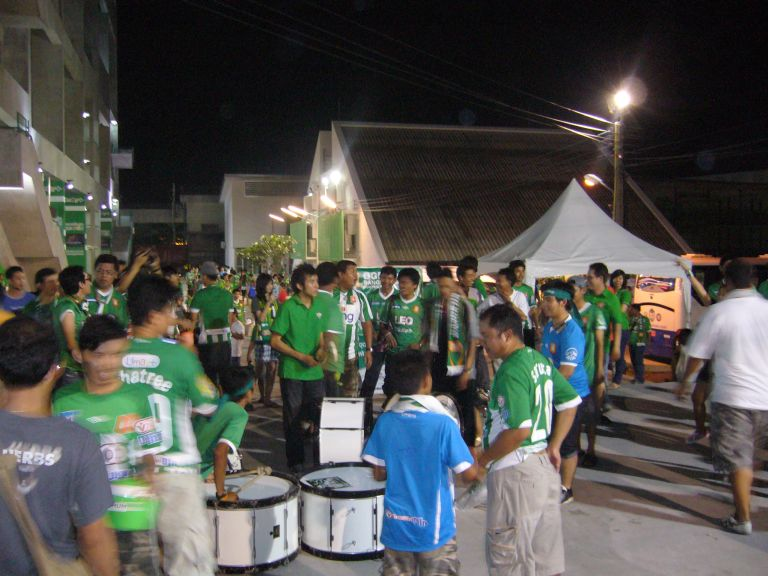
Bangkok Glass Supporters in 2011

2019–present

== Kit suppliers and shirt sponsors ==
=== Title sponsors ===
Period	Kit Manufacturer	Main Sponsor
2008–2014	(United Kingdom) Umbro	(Thailand) Leo
2014–2021	(United States) Nike	(Thailand) Leo
2021–2023	(Thailand) Warrix	(Thailand) Leo
2023–present	(United States) Nike	(Thailand) Leo

=== Kit evolution ===
Home

2011	2012	2013	2014	2015	2016	2017

2018	2019	2020/2021	2021/22	2022/23	2023/24	2024/25

Away

2011	2012	2013	2014	2015	2016	2017

2018	2019	2020/21	2021/22	2022/23	2023/24	2024/25

Third

2012	2013	2014	2021/22	2022/23	2022/23	2023/24

== Stadium ==
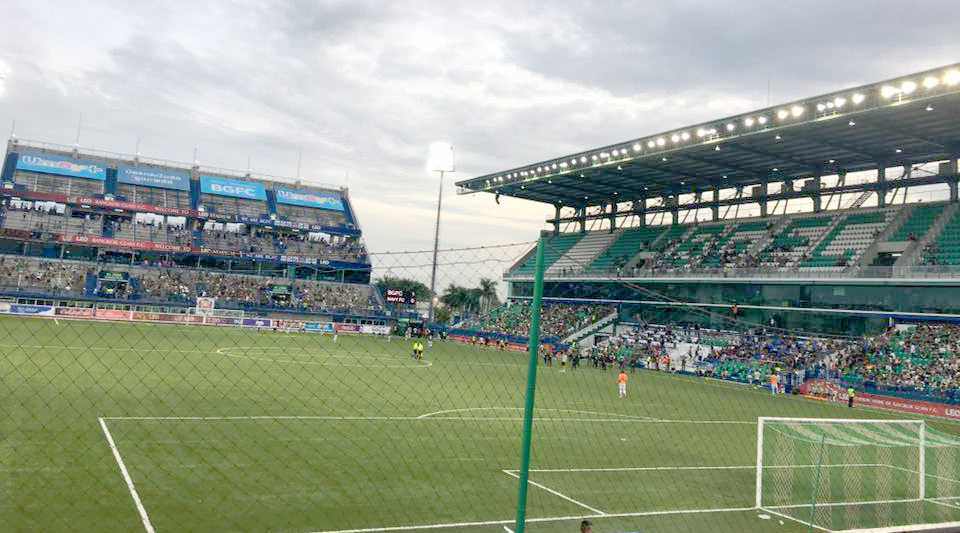
True BG Stadium

BG Stadium, initially named LEO Stadium, is the official home ground of BG Pathum United Football Club, located on the perimeter of the Bangkok Glass Public Company Limited, Pathum Thani province. Since its grand opening in 2010, the ground has been installed with high-quality artificial surface. However, from the 2018 season onward, the stadium was replaced with real grass while the iconic three-sided stadium has gone through multiple phases of evolution to reach its current 15,114 seating capacity and has been approved by FIFA and the AFC as an “A Class” level football ground.

Due to the COVID-19 pandemic, BG Stadium was chosen as the host venue for the 2021 AFC Champions League group F matches and 2022 AFC Champions League Group G matches.

To mark the 114th Anniversary of German club Borussia Dortmund and BG Pathum United new 'E stand', both club played a friendly match at the BG Stadium on 21 July 2024 where BG Pathum United won 4–0 with goals coming from Melvyn Lorenzen, Teerasil Dangda and two goals from Jaroensak Wonggorn in front of 14,114 crowd.

Coordinates	Location	Stadium	Capacity	Year
14°00′02″N 100°40′45″E	Pathum Thani	BG Stadium	15,114	2010–present

== Affiliated clubs ==
=== Former ===
- (Singapore) Tampines Rovers (2023–2026)

On 23 September 2023, BG Pathum have inked a three-year collaboration with Singapore Premier League club, Tampines Rovers. As part of the agreement, the Singaporean outfit will be renamed BG Tampines Rovers from 2024. Kadir Yahaya who is the former Tampines Rovers head coach and current head of youth football for BG Pathum, played a pivotal role in securing the deal. It also understands that after the three years, the Thai club will take over operations of Tampines Rovers to help raise the standards of the league. Under the arrangement, Tampines can gain access to BG Pathum's top-notch facilities for pre-season and mid-season preparations, as well as tap on BG Pathum resources related to modern football technology and cutting-edge sports science, as well as marketing, social media and fan engagement. Thai manufacturer, Bangkok Glass or BG will also become the team's shirt-front sponsor.

=== Current ===
- (Japan) Cerezo Osaka (2012–present)

The club signed a partnership agreement with Cerezo Osaka of the J1 League in September 2012. 2022 marks the 10th year of the Club Club partnership with Cerezo Osaka, for which Yanmar is the top partner. Yanmar supports the development of BG Pathum United playing in the Thai League 1, which is the top level of the Thai football system through sponsorship of both the professional club. In 2018, Chaowat Veerachat joined the partner club on loan to play for Cerezo Osaka U-23 and on 25 June 2022, he joins the Cerezo Osaka senior squad on loan in a trade deal while Cerezo Osaka player, Yusuke Maruhashi joins BG Pathum United on a loan until 31 May 2023.

== Players ==
=== First team squad ===
As of 1 October 2026

Note: Flags indicate national team as defined under FIFA eligibility rules; some limited exceptions apply. Players may hold more than one non-FIFA nationality.

No.	Pos.	Nation	Player
2	DF	THA	Chanon Tamma
3	DF	URU	Yeferson Quintana
4	MF	THA	Leon James
5	MF	THA	Kritsada Kaman
6	MF	THA	Sarach Yooyen (Captain)
7	FW	BRA	Raniel
8	MF	THA	Akarapong Pumwisat
9	FW	THA	Surachat Sareepim
10	MF	DEN	Lucas Andersen
11	FW	THA	Patrik Gustavsson
13	GK	THA	Issarapong Waewdee
15	DF	THA	Chanapach Buaphan
16	DF	JPN	Takahiro Yanagi
17	DF	THA	Elias Dolah
18	MF	THA	Chanathip Songkrasin
19	FW	ENG	Ashley Coffey
21	MF	THA	Pasqual Verkamp

No.	Pos.	Nation	Player
22	FW	BRA	Matheus Costa
24	DF	THA	Saharat Pongsuwan
25	DF	THA	Pawee Tanthatemee
26	MF	FRA	Anthony Belmonte
27	DF	AUT	Jonathan Scherzer
28	GK	THA	Saranon Anuin
30	MF	ESP	Hugo Rama
33	MF	AUS	Ryan Edwards
37	MF	GER	Fabio Kaufmann
39	MF	THA	Tanasith Siripala
44	DF	SRB	Marko Nikolić
45	FW	BRA	João Magno
48	DF	THA	Waris Choolthong
49	GK	THA	Nalawich Intacharoen
50	DF	LUX	Edin Osmanovic
72	MF	THA	Krttapat Seangsawat
74	GK	THA	Phattharapong Rawangpai
89	GK	THA	Chanasorn Kaewyos
90	FW	THA	Pichaya Chaiwarangkun
91	FW	THA	Ratthasat Buaban
93	GK	THA	Ashiravit Nutsuntia

Note 1: Players who are AFC Champions League-quota foreign players are listed in bold.

=== Out on loan ===
Note: Flags indicate national team as defined under FIFA eligibility rules; some limited exceptions apply. Players may hold more than one non-FIFA nationality.

No.	Pos.	Nation	Player
8	MF	THA	Ekanit Panya (at (Thailand) Ratchaburi)
23	DF	THA	Marco Ballini (at (Thailand) Chiangrai United)
26	DF	THA	Thanet Suknate (at (Thailand) Ayutthaya United F.C.)
27	MF	THA	Pongrawit Jantawong (at (Thailand) Ayutthaya United F.C.)
29	DF	THA	Warinthon Jamnongwat (at (Thailand) Ayutthaya United F.C.)
30	MF	THA	Itthimon Tippanet (at (Japan) Hokkaido Consadole Sapporo)
34	MF	THA	Wachirawut Saenchek (at (Thailand) Police Tero)
45	MF	THA	Nattawut Suksum (at (Thailand) Chanthaburi)

No.	Pos.	Nation	Player
47	DF	THA	Nuttawut Wongsawang (at (Thailand) Kanchanaburi Power)
50	MF	THA	Teerapat Pruetong (at (Japan) Hokkaido Consadole Sapporo)
52	FW	THA	Thitipat Ekarunpong (at (Thailand) Nakhon Pathom United)
54	MF	THA	Thanakrit Laorkai (at (Thailand) Bangkok)
59	MF	THA	Nanthiphat Chaiman (at (Japan) Nara Club)
67	MF	THA	Thanadol Kaosaart (at (Thailand) Chanthaburi)
77	FW	THA	Siwakorn Ponsan (at (Japan) Nara Club)
92	DF	THA	Thawatchai Inprakhon (at (Thailand) Chiangrai United)

== Management and staff ==
Position	Name
Head of scouting	(Brazil) Fernando Jorge Avidago da Cunha
Head coach	(Thailand) Peerapong Pichitchotirat
Assistant coach	(Serbia) Andrija Ferlez (Thailand) Pichitphong Choeichiu (Thailand) Punyavee Kongkaew
Set-piece coach	(Spain) Gerardo Rubio
Goalkeeping coach	(Thailand) Kittisak Rawangpa
Fitness coaches	(Serbia) David Sabo (Thailand) Auttapon Boonsan (Thailand) Phudith Phakaprapaboonnakul
Analysts	(Thailand) Kittipat Sioain (Thailand) Kanate Thanasunthonsut (Thailand) Naruebet Saengsawang
Doctor	(Thailand) Pakapon Issaragrisil
Physiotherapists	(Thailand) Yongsak Lertdamrongkiet (Thailand) Saranyoo Kheawlek (Thailand) Chalotorn Chaisiri
Masseurs	(Japan) Ryuto Kanemitsu (Thailand) Anupat Kraisung (Thailand) Suntisuk Sakuldee (Thailand) Kanoksak Thongchu
Nutritionist	(Thailand) Thanatpong Sukwong
Interpreter	(Thailand) Panithi Nilangso
Team's Staff	(Brazil) Vinicius Santos Costa (Thailand) Twatchai Khamkloy (Thailand) Sarot Jaroensuk (Thailand) Pornchai Phonkun

== Honours ==
Type	Honours	Titles	Seasons
League	Thai League 1/First division	1	2020–21
League	Thai League 2/Second division	1	2019
Cup	Thai FA Cup	1	2014
Cup	Thai League Cup	1	2023–24
Cup	Thailand Champions Cup	2	2021, 2022
Cup	Thai Super Cup	1	2009
Cup	Queen's Cup	1	2010
Others	Singapore Cup	1	2010

Bold is for those competition that are currently active.

== Award winners ==
=== Domestic ===
- Most Valuable Player
  - (Thailand) Sumanya Purisai (2020–21)
- Coach of the Season
  - (Thailand) Attaphol Buspakom (2013)
  - (Thailand) Surachai Jaturapattarapong (2020–21)
- Team of the Season
  - (Thailand) Chanathip Songkrasin (2024–25)

=== Continental ===
==== ASEAN Club Championship ====
- Young Player of the Tournament
  - (Singapore) Ilhan Fandi (2024–25)
- Team of the Tournament
  - (Thailand) Kritsada Kaman (2024–25)

== Records and statistics ==
As of 14 October 2026.

Top 10 all-time appearances
Rank	Player	Years	Club appearances
1	(Thailand) Surachat Sareepim	2016–present	240
2	(Thailand) Chatree Chimtalay	2008–2023	225
3	(Thailand) Sarach Yooyen	2020–present	218
4	(Thailand) Chaowat Veerachart	2017–2026	188
5	(Thailand) Peerapong Pichitchotirat	2007–2018, 2020–2021, 2021–2022	167
6	(Thailand) Narit Taweekul	2013–2019	164
7	(Thailand) Santiphap Channgom	2020–2025	163
8	(Thailand) Apisit Sorada	2017–2025	143
9	(Spain) Toti	2015–2021	142
10	(Australia) Matt Smith	2015–2018	129

Top 10 all-time scorers
Rank	Player	Club appearances	Total goals
1	(Thailand) Surachat Sareepim	240	57
2	(Singapore) Ikhsan Fandi	100	50
2	(Thailand) Chatree Chimtalay	225	50
4	(Thailand) Teerasil Dangda	106	47
5	(Costa Rica) Ariel Rodríguez	72	34
6	(Spain) Toti	142	28
7	(Brazil) Raniel	52	25
8	(Brazil) Diogo	52	24
8	(Namibia) Lazarus Kaimbi	72	24
10	(Brazil) Barros Tardeli	33	22

- Biggest wins: 12–0 vs Warin Chamrap (29 October 2025)
- Heaviest defeats: 0–6 vs (South Korea) FC Seoul (23 February 2016)
- Youngest goal scorers: Siwakorn Ponsan ~ 17 years 10 months 27 days old (On 21 December 2025 vs Ubon Kids City)
- Oldest goal scorers: Surachat Sareepim ~ 39 years 7 months 4 days old (On 28 December 2025 vs Uttaradit)
- Youngest ever debutant: Pichaya Chaiwarangkun ~ 16 years 8 months 21 days old (On 28 December 2025 vs Uttaradit)
- Oldest ever player: Pisan Dorkmaikaew ~ 41 years 7 months 11 days old (On 21 December 2025 vs Ubon Kids City)

== Notable players ==
For details on former players, see Category:Bangkok Glass F.C. players.

=== International capped players ===
AFC/OFC.: (Australia) Matt Smith; (Australia) Ryan Edwards; (Cambodia) Takaki Ose; (Japan) Gakuto Notsuda; (Japan) Mitsuru Maruoka; (Japan) Riku Matsuda; (Japan) Teruyuki Moniwa; (Japan) Yoshiaki Takagi; (Japan) Yusuke Maruhashi; (Laos) Phoutthavong Sangvilay; (Malaysia) Kiko Insa; (Malaysia) Norshahrul Idlan; (Philippines) Álvaro Silva; (Philippines) Jesse Curran; (Philippines) Kevin Ingreso; (Singapore) Ilhan Fandi; (Singapore) Ikhsan Fandi; (Singapore) Irfan Fandi; (Singapore) Jordan Emaviwe; (Singapore) Ryhan Stewart; (Uzbekistan) Igor Sergeev	CAF.: (Chad) Sylvain Idangar; (Guinea-Bissau) Frédéric Mendy; (Mali) Kalifa Cissé; (Namibia) Lazarus Kaimbi; (South Africa) Lars Veldwijk; (Uganda) Melvyn Lorenzen	UEFA.: (Croatia) Denis Bušnja; (Croatia) Renato Kelić; (Denmark) Lucas Andersen; (Georgia (country)) Nika Sandokhadze; (Georgia (country)) Zurab Tsiskaridze; (Republic of Ireland) Billy Mehmet; (Israel) Ben Azubel; (Israel) Lidor Cohen; (North Macedonia) Blazhe Ilijoski; (North Macedonia) Darko Tasevski; (North Macedonia) Mario Gjurovski; (Montenegro) Miloš Drinčić; (Wales) Michael Byrne	CONMEBOL/ CONCACAF.: (Bolivia) Jhasmani Campos; (Costa Rica) Ariel Rodríguez; (Costa Rica) José Mena; (Venezuela) Andrés Túñez

== Managerial history ==
List of BG Pathum United managers by years (2009–present)

Name	Period	Honours
As Bangkok Glass
(Germany) Hans Rudolf Emser	March 2009 – June 2009	2009 Singapore Cup Runner-up
(Thailand) Surachai Jaturapattarapong	June 2009 – June 2010	2009 Singapore Cup Runner-up; 2009 Thai Super Cup; 2010 Queen's Cup
(Brazil) Carlos Roberto	June 2010 – October 2010	
(Thailand) Supasin Leelarit	October 2010 – December 2010	2010 Singapore Cup
(Thailand) Sathit Bensoh	December 2010 – March 2011	
(Thailand) Arjhan Srong-ngamsub	March 2011 – December 2011	
(Thailand) Surachai Jaturapattarapong	January 2012 – October 2012	
(England) Phil Stubbins	October 2012 – March 2013	
(Thailand) Anurak Srikerd	March 2013 – May 2013	
(Thailand) Attaphol Buspakom	May 2013 – June 2014	2013 Thai FA Cup Runner-up
(Thailand) Anurak Srikerd (2)	June 2014 – November 2014	2014 Thai FA Cup
(Spain) Ricardo Rodríguez	November 2014 – November 2015	2015 Kor Royal Cup Runner-up
(Thailand) Anurak Srikerd (3)	November 2015 – June 2016	
(Australia) Aurelio Vidmar	August 2016 – July 2017	
(Thailand) Surachai Jaturapattarapong (2)	July 2017 – November 2017	
(Spain) Josep Ferré	November 2017 – March 2018	
(Thailand) Anurak Srikerd (4)	April 2018 – October 2018	
As BG Pathum United
(Thailand) Dusit Chalermsan	October 2018 – April 2021	2019 Thai League 2 2020–21 Thai League 1
(Australia) Aurelio Vidmar (2)	May 2021 – November 2021	2021 Thailand Champions Cup
(Thailand) Dusit Chalermsan	November 2021 – January 2022	
(Thailand) Surachai Jaturapattarapong	January 2022 – February 2022	
(Japan) Makoto Teguramori	February 2022 – October 2022	2022 Thailand Champions Cup
(Japan) Mitsuo Kato (interim)	October 2022	
(Australia) Matt Smith	October 2022 – March 2023	
(Thailand) Supachai Komsilp (interim)	March 2023 – May 2023	
(Thailand) Thongchai Sukkoki	May 2023 – December 2023	
(Japan) Makoto Teguramori (2)	December 2023 – October 2024	2023–24 Thai League Cup
(Thailand) Surachai Jaturapattarapong (2)	October 2024 – January 2025	
(Thailand) Supachai Komsilp (2)	January 2025 – February 2025	
(United States) Anthony Hudson	February 2025 – April 2025	
(Thailand) Supachai Komsilp	April 2025 – October 2025	
(Montenegro) Vladimir Vujović (interim)	October 2025	
(Japan) Masatada Ishii	30 October 2025 – 6 February 2026	
(Montenegro) Vladimir Vujović (2)	9 February 2026 – October 2026	
(Thailand) Peerapong Pichitchotirat	16 October 2026 – present	

== Season by season record ==
Season	League									FA Cup	League Cup	Kor Cup / Champions Cup	ACL	ACL2	Other	Top scorer	
Season	Division	P	W	D	L	F	A	Pts	Pos	FA Cup	League Cup	Kor Cup / Champions Cup	ACL	ACL2	Other	Name	Goals
2009	TPL	30	16	8	6	45	31	56	3rd	QF	–	–	–	–	Singapore; Cup – RU	Nantawat Tansopa	11
2010	TPL	30	12	9	9	48	38	45	5th	R3	QF	–	–	–	Singapore; Cup – W	Chatree Chimtalay	10
2011	TPL	34	15	8	11	55	41	53	5th	R4	R3	–	–	–	–	Sarayuth Chaikamdee	15
2012	TPL	34	10	15	9	53	39	45	8th	SF	SF	–	–	–	–	Samuel Ajayi	11
2013	TPL	32	14	8	10	32	40	50	5th	RU	R2	–	–	–	–	Chatree Chimtalay	10
2014	TPL	38	14	7	17	70	65	49	10th	W	QF	–	–	–	–	Lazarus Kaimbi	12
2015	TPL	34	15	11	8	47	38	56	6th	R3	R3	RU	PO	–	–	Darko Tasevski; Aridane	9
2016	TL	31	18	3	10	62	41	57	3rd	R2	R2	–	–	–	–	Ariel Rodríguez	19
2017	T1	34	16	8	10	63	44	56	5th	R3	R1	–	–	–	–	Jhasmani Campos; Surachat Sareepim	10
2018	T1	34	11	9	14	55	46	42	14th	R2	RU	–	–	–	–	David Bala; Surachat Sareepim	8
2019	T2	34	24	6	4	76	27	78	1st	R2	QF	–	–	–	–	Barros Tardeli	18
2020–21	T1	30	24	5	1	54	13	77	1st	R2	–	–	–	–	–	Victor Cardozo	15
2021–22	T1	30	17	9	4	52	27	60	2nd	QF	QF	W	R16	–	–	Diogo	10
2022–23	T1	30	12	5	13	42	39	41	9th	QF	RU	W	QF	–	–	Teerasil Dangda	11
2023–24	T1	30	15	9	6	59	38	54	4th	R2	W	–	GS	–	–	Ikhsan Fandi	8
2024–25	T1	30	15	8	7	47	34	53	3rd	SF	R2	–	–	–	Singapore; Cup – SF	Raniel	11
2025–26	T1	30	14	10	6	45	29	52	4th	R3	RU	–	–	GS	–	Tomoyuki Doi	11

Champions	Runners-up	Third place	Promoted	Relegated

- P = Played
- W = Games won
- D = Games drawn
- L = Games lost
- F = Goals for
- A = Goals against
- Pts = Points
- Pos = Final position
- TPL = Thai Premier League
- TL = Thai League
- T1 = Thai League 1
- QR1 = First Qualifying Round
- QR2 = Second Qualifying Round
- QR3 = Third Qualifying Round
- QR4 = Fourth Qualifying Round
- RInt = Intermediate Round
- R1 = Round 1
- R2 = Round 2
- R3 = Round 3
- R4 = Round 4
- R5 = Round 5
- R6 = Round 6
- GS = Group stage
- QF = Quarter-finals
- SF = Semi-finals
- RU = Runners-up
- S = Shared
- W = Winners

== Continental record ==
Season	Competition	Round	Club	Home	Away	Aggregate
2015	AFC Champions League	Preliminary round 2	(Malaysia) Johor Darul Ta'zim	3–0	—N/a	—N/a
2015	AFC Champions League	Play-off round	(China) Beijing Guoan	—N/a	0–3	—N/a
2021	AFC Champions League	Group F	(Philippines) Kaya–Iloilo	4–1	1–0	2nd out of 4
2021	AFC Champions League	Group F	(South Korea) Ulsan Hyundai	0–2	0–2	2nd out of 4
2021	AFC Champions League	Group F	(Vietnam) Viettel	2–0	3–1	2nd out of 4
2021	AFC Champions League	Round of 16	(South Korea) Jeonbuk Hyundai Motors	1–1 (a.e.t.) (2–4 p)		
2022	AFC Champions League	Group G	(Australia) Melbourne City	1–1	0–0	1st out of 4
2022	AFC Champions League	Group G	(South Korea) Jeonnam Dragons	0–0	2–0	1st out of 4
2022	AFC Champions League	Group G	(Philippines) United City	5–0	3–1	1st out of 4
2022	AFC Champions League	Round of 16	(Hong Kong) Kitchee	4–0		
2022	AFC Champions League	Quarter-finals	(Japan) Urawa Red Diamonds	0–4		
2023–24	AFC Champions League	Play-off round	(China) Shanghai Port	—N/a	3–2	—N/a
2023–24	AFC Champions League	Group I	(South Korea) Ulsan Hyundai	1–3	1–3	4th out of 4
2023–24	AFC Champions League	Group I	(Malaysia) Johor Darul Ta'zim	2–4	1–4	4th out of 4
2023–24	AFC Champions League	Group I	(Japan) Kawasaki Frontale	2–4	2–4	4th out of 4
2024–25	ASEAN Club Championship	Group A	(Indonesia) PSM Makassar	—N/a	0–0	1st out of 6
2024–25	ASEAN Club Championship	Group A	(Cambodia) PKR Svay Rieng	2–1	—N/a	1st out of 6
2024–25	ASEAN Club Championship	Group A	(Vietnam) Đông Á Thanh Hóa	1–1	—N/a	1st out of 6
2024–25	ASEAN Club Championship	Group A	(Myanmar) Shan United	—N/a	4–1	1st out of 6
2024–25	ASEAN Club Championship	Group A	(Malaysia) Terengganu	4–3	—N/a	1st out of 6
2024–25	ASEAN Club Championship	Semi-finals	(Thailand) Buriram United	0–0	1–3	1–3
2024–25	Singapore Cup	Group B	(Singapore) Tanjong Pagar United	2–1		2nd out of 5
2024–25	Singapore Cup	Group B	(Singapore) Geylang International	2–2		2nd out of 5
2024–25	Singapore Cup	Group B	(Singapore) Balestier Khalsa	2–1		2nd out of 5
2024–25	Singapore Cup	Group B	(Singapore) Lion City Sailors	1–1		2nd out of 5
2024–25	Singapore Cup	Semi-finals	(Singapore) Tampines Rovers	1–1	2–3 (a.e.t.)	3–4 (a.e.t.)
2025–26	AFC Champions League Two	Group H	(South Korea) Pohang Steelers	0–1	0–2	3rd out of 4
2025–26	AFC Champions League Two	Group H	(Philippines) Kaya–Iloilo	2–1	2–0	3rd out of 4
2025–26	AFC Champions League Two	Group H	(Singapore) Tampines Rovers	0–2	1–2	3rd out of 4
2025–26	ASEAN Club Championship	Group A	(Vietnam) Công An Hà Nội	2–1	—N/a	3rd out of 6
2025–26	ASEAN Club Championship	Group A	(Thailand) Buriram United	2–2	—N/a	3rd out of 6
2025–26	ASEAN Club Championship	Group A	(Singapore) Tampines Rovers	—N/a	2–3	3rd out of 6
2025–26	ASEAN Club Championship	Group A	(Philippines) Dynamic Herb Cebu	2–0	—N/a	3rd out of 6
2025–26	ASEAN Club Championship	Group A	(Malaysia) Selangor	—N/a	1–1	3rd out of 6
2026–27	AFC Champions League Two	Group F	(Australia) Adelaide United	1–2		
2026–27	AFC Champions League Two	Group F	(Singapore) Lion City Sailors		1–1	
2026–27	AFC Champions League Two	Group F	(Hong Kong) Tai Po	4–1	3–0	

=== Statistics ===
Statistics of BG Pathum United in Asian competitions.

Competition	Pld	W	D	L	GF	GA	GD	Win%
AFC Champions League	24	10	4	10	41	40	+1	41.67
AFC Champions League Two	8	4	0	4	12	9	+3	50.00
ASEAN Club Championship	12	5	5	2	21	16	+5	41.67
Singapore Cup	6	2	3	1	10	9	+1	33.33

=== By country ===
Country	Pld	W	D	L	GF	GA	GD	Win%
Australia	2	0	2	0	1	1	+0	0.00
Cambodia	1	1	0	0	2	1	+1	100.00
China	2	1	0	1	3	5	−2	50.00
Hong Kong	3	3	0	0	11	1	+10	100.00
Indonesia	1	0	1	0	0	0	+0	0.00
Japan	3	0	0	3	4	12	−8	0.00
Malaysia	5	2	1	2	11	12	−1	40.00
Myanmar	1	1	0	0	4	1	+3	100.00
Philippines	7	7	0	0	19	3	+16	100.00
Singapore	9	2	3	4	13	16	−3	22.22
South Korea	9	1	2	6	5	14	−9	11.11
Thailand	3	0	2	1	3	5	−2	0.00
Vietnam	4	3	1	0	8	3	+5	75.00
