= 2018 Buriram United F.C. season =

Buriram United
2018 season
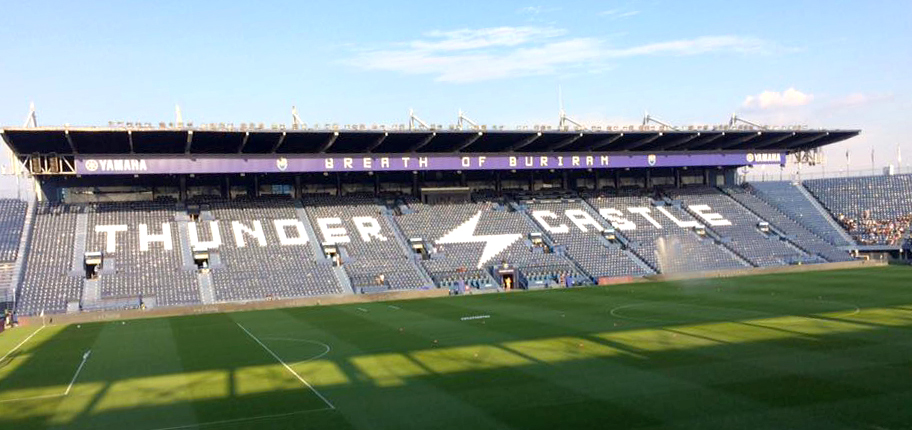
- Chang Arena in 2018
- Chairman: Newin Chidchob
- Head coach: Bozidar Bandovic
- Stadium: Chang Arena
- Thai League: Champions
- FA Cup: Runners–up
- League Cup: Semi-finals
- Champions Cup: Runners–up
- AFC Champions League: Round of 16 (knocked out by Jeonbuk Hyundai Motors)
- Top goalscorer: League: (Brazil) Diogo (34); All: (Brazil) Diogo (43)
- Highest home attendance: 35,573 v Pattaya United; Thai League; 29 September 2018
- Lowest home attendance: 5,941 v Lampang; FA Cup; 4 July 2018
Home colours	Away colours	Third colours

The 2018 season is Buriram United's 7th season in the Thai League. The club enters the season as the Thai League champions, and will participate in the 2018 Thai League. They are the defending champions and will also participate in the FA Cup, League Cup, Champions Cup and AFC Champions League.

== Club information ==
Owner	(Thailand) Newin Chidchob
Ground (capacity and dimensions)	Chang Arena (32,600 / 4,046 m^{2})
Training Ground	Chang Training Ground, Buriram; Buriram United Football Camp, Samut Prakan

Source: Club

== Squad information ==
As of 29 June 2018

Squad No.	Name	Nationality	Position(s)	Date of birth (age)
Goalkeepers
1	Siwarak Tedsungnoen	(Thailand)	GK	20 April 1984 (age 42)
29	Yotsapon Teangdar	(Thailand)	GK	6 April 1992 (age 34)
99	Kevin Sangsamanan	(Thailand) (Sweden) (France)	GK	20 May 1997 (age 29)
Defenders
3	Pansa Hemviboon	(Thailand)	DF	8 July 1990 (age 36)
5	Andrés Túñez	(Spain) (Venezuela)	DF	15 March 1987 (age 39)
11	Korrakot Wiriyaudomsiri	(Thailand)	DF	19 March 1988 (age 38)
13	Narubadin Weerawatnodom	(Thailand)	DF	12 July 1994 (age 32)
14	Chitipat Tanklang	(Thailand)	DF	11 August 1991 (age 35)
23	Chris Herd	(Scotland) (Australia)	DF	4 April 1989 (age 37)
33	Sarayut Sompim	(Thailand)	DF	23 March 1997 (age 29)
Midfielders
6	Sasalak Haiprakhon	(Thailand)	MF	8 January 1996 (age 30)
8	Suchao Nuchnum	(Thailand)	MF	17 May 1983 (age 43)
10	Jakkaphan Kaewprom	(Thailand)	MF	24 May 1988 (age 38)
16	Yoo Jun-soo	(South Korea)	MF	8 May 1988 (age 38)
19	Supachok Sarachat	(Thailand)	MF	22 May 1998 (age 28)
26	Ratthanakorn Maikami	(Thailand)	MF	1 January 1998 (age 28)
27	Siwarut Pholhirun	(Thailand)	MF	23 September 1996 (age 30)
31	Anuwat Noicheunphan	(Thailand)	MF	21 September 1988 (age 38)
77	Mehti Sarakham	(Thailand)	MF	21 May 1999 (age 27)
Strikers
9	Supachai Jaided	(Thailand)	FW	1 December 1998 (age 27)
17	Osvaldo	(Brazil)	FW	11 April 1987 (age 39)
20	Javier Patiño	(Spain) (Philippines)	FW	14 February 1988 (age 38)
40	Diogo	(Brazil)	FW	26 May 1987 (age 39)

== Transfers ==
=== In ===
No.	Pos	Player	Transferred From	Fee	Date	Source
1st leg
–	MF	(Thailand) Apichart Denman	(Thailand) Phuket	Undisclosed	30 November 2017	
–	MF	(Thailand) Mehti Sarakham	(Thailand) Suankularb	Undisclosed	3 December 2017	
–	FW	(Brazil) Edgar	(Qatar) Al-Duhail	Undisclosed	19 December 2017	
–	GK	(Thailand) Kevin Sangsamanan	(Sweden) Vallentuna BK	Undisclosed	20 December 2017	
–	DF	(Thailand) Sasalak Haiprakhon	(Thailand) Bangkok United	Undisclosed	25 December 2017	
–	DF	(Thailand) Sarayut Sompim	(Thailand) Bangkok United	Undisclosed	26 December 2017	
–	FW	(Vietnam) Hoàng Vũ Samson	(Vietnam) Hà Nội	Undisclosed	29 December 2017	
–	DF	(Thailand) Ekkaluck Thonghkit	(Thailand) Ratchaburi Mitr Phol	Undisclosed	30 December 2017	
2nd leg
20	FW	(Spain) - (Philippines) Javier Patiño	(China) Henan Jianye	Undisclosed	23 April 2017	
31	MF	(Thailand) Anuwat Noicheunphan	(Thailand) Chainat Hornbill	Undisclosed	23 May 2017	
17	FW	(Brazil) Osvaldo	(Brazil) Fortaleza	Undisclosed	23 May 2017	
23	DF	(Australia) Chris Herd	(Australia) Western Sydney Wanderers	Undisclosed	28 June 2017	

=== Loan in ===
No.	Pos	Player	Loaned From	Start	End	Source
2nd leg
27	MF	(Thailand) Siwarut Pholhirun	(Thailand) Ratchaburi Mitr Phol	23 May 2018	30 November 2018	

=== Loan out ===
No.	Pos	Player	Loaned To	Start	End	Source
1st leg
—	MF	(Thailand) Baramee Limwattana	(Thailand) Chainat Hornbill	28 November 2017	30 November 2018	
—	GK	(Thailand) Kwanchai Suklom	(Thailand) Prachuap	30 November 2017	30 November 2018	
—	DF	(Thailand) Peerawat Akkatam	(Thailand) Prachuap	30 November 2017	30 November 2018	
—	MF	(Thailand) Apichart Denman	(Thailand) Prachuap	30 November 2017	30 November 2018	
—	DF	(Thailand) Abdulhafiz Bueraheng	(Thailand) PTT Rayong	24 December 2017	30 November 2018	
—	MF	(South Korea) Go Seul-ki	(South Korea) Incheon United	11 January 2018	30 November 2018	
2nd leg
—	MF	(Philippines) Luke Woodland	(Thailand) Suphanburi	29 June 2018	30 November 2018	

== Kit ==
=== Domestic competitions ===
Supplier: Made by club / Sponsor: Chang

Home	Away	Third	Goalkeeper 1	Goalkeeper 2	Goalkeeper 3

=== ACL special ===
Supplier: Warrix Sports / Sponsor: Chang

Home	Away

== Competitions ==
=== Overview ===
Competition	First match	Last match	Starting round	Final position	Record							
Competition	First match	Last match	Starting round	Final position	Pld	W	D	L	GF	GA	GD	Win %
Thai League	9 February 2018	7 October 2018	Matchday 1	Winners	34	28	3	3	76	25	+51	82.35
FA Cup	27 June 2018	27 October 2018	First round	Runners-up	6	4	1	1	15	6	+9	66.67
League Cup	13 June 2018	19 September 2018	First round	Semi-finals	4	3	0	1	9	4	+5	75.00
Champions Cup	19 January 2018		Final	Runners-up	1	0	1	0	2	2	+0	0.00
Champions League	14 February 2018	15 May 2018	Group stage	Round of 16	8	3	3	2	10	10	+0	37.50
Total					53	38	8	7	112	47	+65	71.70

Last updated: 27 October 2018
Source: Competitions

=== Champions Cup ===
19 January 2018 Final	Buriram United	2–2 (5–6 p)	Chiangrai United	Pathum Wan, Bangkok
19:00 UTC+7	Edgar 5'; Diogo 34'	Report	Sivakorn 45+2'; Victor Cardozo 67'	Stadium: Suphachalasai Stadium; Attendance: 12,560; Referee: Sivakorn Pu-udom
	Penalties
	Túñez (penalty scored); Suchao (penalty scored); Supachai (penalty missed); Edgar (penalty missed); Siwarak (penalty scored); Anon (penalty scored); Jakkaphan (penalty missed); Samson (penalty missed); Ratthanakorn (penalty scored); Túñez (penalty missed)		(penalty missed) Cleiton; (penalty scored) Macena; (penalty scored) Phitiwat; (penalty scored) Victor; (penalty missed) Chatchai; (penalty scored) Tanasak; (penalty missed) Shinnaphat; (penalty missed) Mongkol; (penalty scored) Piyaphon; (penalty scored) Cleiton

=== Thai League ===
==== League table ====
Pos	Team	Pld	W	D	L	GF	GA	GD	Pts	Qualification or relegation
1	Buriram United (C, Q)	34	28	3	3	76	25	+51	87	Qualification to 2019 AFC Champions League Group stage
2	Bangkok United (Q)	34	21	8	5	68	36	+32	71	Qualification to 2019 AFC Champions League Preliminary round 2
3	Port	34	19	4	11	73	45	+28	61	
4	Muangthong United	34	16	11	7	65	53	+12	59	
5	Chiangrai United (Q)	34	15	10	9	52	36	+16	55	Qualification to 2019 AFC Champions League Preliminary round 2 (Note: Chiangrai United qualified to the 2019 AFC Champions League Preliminary round 2 as winners of the 2018 Thai FA Cup.)

Source: Thai League
Rules for classification: 1) Points; 2) Head-to-head points; 3) Head-to-head goals difference; 4) Head-to-head goals scored; 5) Overall goals difference; 6) Overall goals scored; 7) Fair play points; 8) Play-off without extra time;).
(C) Champions; (Q) Qualified for the phase indicated

==== Results summary ====
Overall								Home						Away					
Pld	W	D	L	GF	GA	GD	Pts	W	D	L	GF	GA	GD	W	D	L	GF	GA	GD
34	28	3	3	76	25	+51	87	16	0	1	40	9	+31	12	3	2	36	16	+20

==== Results by matchday ====
Matchday	1	2	3	4	5	6	7	8	9	10	11	12	13	14	15	16	17	18	19	20	21	22	23	24	25	26	27	28	29	30	31	32	33	34
Ground	H	H	A	H	A	H	A	H	A	H	A	H	A	H	A	A	H	A	H	A	H	A	H	A	H	A	H	A	H	A	H	H	A	A
Result	W	W	W	W	D	W	W	W	D	W	L	W	L	W	W	W	W	W	L	W	W	W	W	W	W	D	W	W	W	W	W	W	W	W
Position	4	3	3	1	1	1	1	1	1	1	1	1	1	1	1	1	1	1	2	1	1	1	1	1	1	1	1	1	1	1	1	1	1	1

Updated to match(es) played on 7 October 2018. Source: Thai League T1
A = Away; H = Home; W = Win; D = Draw; L = Loss

==== Matches ====
9 February 2018 1	Buriram United	2–1	Ratchaburi Mitr Phol	Buriram
19:00 UTC+7	Jakkaphan 60'; Diogo 67'; Narubadin (yellow card) 73'	Report	Pathomchai (yellow card) 34'; Sila (yellow card) 59'; Menezes 75' (pen.); Philip 87'	Stadium: Chang Arena; Attendance: 10,144; Referee: Sivakorn Pu-udom; Man of the Match: Jakkaphan Kaewprom

18 February 2018 2	Buriram United	1–0	Bangkok Glass	Buriram
19:00 UTC+7	Ratthanakorn (yellow card) 67'; Diogo 73'	Report	Piyachanok (yellow card) 19'; M. Gjurovski (yellow card) 45'; Mongkol (yellow card) 85'; Apiwat (yellow card) 87'	Stadium: Chang Arena; Attendance: 11,085; Referee: Torpong Somsing; Man of the Match: Diogo Luís Santo

25 February 2018 3	Chainat Hornbill	0–2	Buriram United	Chai Nat
18:00 UTC+7	Laksana (yellow card) 35'; Teerath (yellow card) 51'; Anuwat (yellow card) 53'	Report	Korrakot (yellow card) 26'; Supachok 54'; Diogo 55'; Pravinwat (yellow card) 73'	Stadium: Khao Plong Stadium; Attendance: 4,171; Referee: Mongkolchai Petsri; Man of the Match: Jakkaphan Kaewprom

2 March 2018 4	Buriram United	3–0	Prachuap	Buriram
20:00 UTC+7	Diogo 21', 65' (pen.); Ratthanakorn 83'	Report	Doumbouya (yellow card) 45+1'; Sompob (yellow card) 63'	Stadium: Chang Arena; Attendance: 6,294; Referee: Weeraphon Laosuphan; Man of the Match: Diogo Luís Santo

10 March 2018 5	Bangkok United	2–2	Buriram United	Khlong Luang, Pathum Thani
19:00 UTC+7	Teeratep 11'; Anthony (yellow card) 24'; Mika (yellow card) 37'; Robson 55'	Report	Pansa 6'; Sasalak (yellow card) 10'; Ratthanakorn (yellow card) 17'; Diogo (yellow card) 38'; Edgar Silva 57'	Stadium: Thammasat Stadium; Attendance: 7,447; Referee: Ketdamrong Khemthong

18 March 2018 6	Buriram United	2–0	Navy	Buriram
18:00 UTC+7	Diogo 23', 40'	Report	Chalitpong (yellow card) 7'; Kriangkrai (yellow card) 9'	Stadium: Chang Arena; Attendance: 9,479; Referee: Sarayut Chakngoen; Man of the Match: Diogo Luís Santo

28 March 2018 7	Ubon UMT United	2–3	Buriram United	Ubon Ratchathani
19:00 UTC+7	Hartmann 26'; Nattawut 52', (yellow card) 89'; Nattapon (yellow card) 59'	Report	Diogo 3', 35', 75'; Jun-soo (yellow card) 73'; Supachai (yellow card) 90'	Stadium: UMT Stadium; Attendance: 5,135; Referee: Anusorn Nukaew; Man of the Match: Diogo Luís Santo

31 March 2018 8	Buriram United	2–1	Chonburi	Buriram
17:45 UTC+7	Diogo 18'; Pravinwat (yellow card) 87'; Anon (yellow card) 90'; Jun-soo 90+2'	Report	Marclei (yellow card) 38'; Kroekrit 53'; Ciro (yellow card) 65'	Stadium: Chang Arena; Attendance: 10,890; Referee: Wichet Tianthong; Man of the Match: Diogo Luís Santo

7 April 2018 9	Suphanburi	1–1	Buriram United	Suphan Buri
19:00 UTC+7	Tinnakorn (yellow card) 20'; Romulo 50'; Suban (yellow card) 80'	Report	Diogo (yellow card) 20'; Edgar Silva (yellow card) 32', (goal) 42'	Stadium: Suphan Buri Provincial Stadium; Attendance: 13,156; Referee: Warinthorn Satsadee; Man of the Match: Siwarak Tedsungnoen

11 April 2018 10	Buriram United	3–1	Port	Buriram
17:45 UTC+7	Diogo 27', (yellow card) 52'; Korrakot (yellow card) 78'; Túñez 81'; Edgar Silva 90'	Report	Nurul 13'; Elias (yellow card) 31'; Pakorn (yellow card) 86'	Stadium: Chang Arena; Attendance: 11,845; Referee: Thattharawut Khanthawichai; Man of the Match: Jakkaphan Kaewprom

22 April 2018 11	Chiangrai United	1–0	Buriram United	Chiang Rai
18:00 UTC+7	Cardozo 37', (yellow card) 42'; Piyaphon (yellow card) 56'; Sivakorn (yellow card) 84'; Chaiyawat (yellow card) 88'	Report	Pravinwat (yellow card) 32'; Diogo (yellow card) 56'	Stadium: Singha Stadium; Attendance: 10,054; Referee: Sarayut Chakngoen

25 April 2018 12	Buriram United	2–1	Nakhon Ratchasima	Buriram
19:00 UTC+7	Jun-soo 9'; Túñez 23'; Pravinwat (yellow card) 45+1'	Report	Kitsada (yellow card) 4'; Eakkanut 8'	Stadium: Chang Arena; Attendance: 8,818; Referee: Wichet Tianthong; Man of the Match: Andrés Túñez

29 April 2018 13	Sukhothai	1–0	Buriram United	Sukhothai
19:00 UTC+7	Baworn (yellow card) 56'; Njiva (yellow card) 77', (goal) 79'; Nelson (yellow card) 90+3'; J. Baggio (yellow card) 90+5'	Report	Jakkaphan (yellow card) 39'; Sasalak (yellow card) 90+2'	Stadium: Thung Thalay Luang Stadium; Attendance: 6,094; Referee: Panumas Pansamo

4 May 2018 14	Buriram United	4–0	SCG Muangthong United	Buriram
19:00 UTC+7	Jun-soo 24'; Diogo 31', 38'; Suchao (yellow card) 51'; Korrakot 87'	Report	Adisorn (yellow card) 86'	Stadium: Chang Arena; Attendance: 30,011; Referee: Warinthorn Satsadee; Man of the Match: Diogo Luís Santo
Note: Postponed due to Champions League Knockout stage match (8 May); originally scheduled for 5 May 2018.

12 May 2018 15	Police Tero	1–2	Buriram United	Lak Si, Bangkok
17:45 UTC+7	Aung Thu 58'; Chompon (red card) 70'; Michaël (yellow card) 73'	Report	Edgar Silva 31', 35'; Jakkaphan (yellow card) 83'	Stadium: Boonyachinda Stadium; Attendance: 4,540; Referee: Mongkolchai Phetsri; Man of the Match: Edgar Bruno da Silva
Note: Postponed due to Champions League Knockout stage match (15 May); originally scheduled for 20:00 same day.

20 May 2018 16	Pattaya United	2–4	Buriram United	Bang Lamung, Chonburi
18:00 UTC+7	Rafinha (yellow card) 29'; Picha 63'; Sarawut (yellow card) 75'; Nopparat (yellow card) 78'; Jaroensak 90+4'	Report	Edgar Silva 18', 42', 58'; Pansa (yellow card) 23'; Diogo 78'	Stadium: Nong Prue Stadium; Attendance: 5,500; Referee: Niwat Insa-ad; Man of the Match: Edgar Bruno da Silva
Note: Postponed due to Champions League Knockout stage match (15 May); originally scheduled for 19 May 2018

26 May 2018 17	Buriram United	5–0	Air Force Central	Buriram
18:00 UTC+7	Jakkaphan 8'; Korrakot 29'; Diogo 55' (pen.); Suphanat 65', 84'	Report		Stadium: Chang Arena; Attendance: 8,836; Referee: Chaiyaporn Yongsaeng; Man of the Match: Diogo Luís Santo

9 June 2018 18	Bangkok Glass	1–2	Buriram United	Thanyaburi, Pathum Thani
19:00 UTC+7	Surachat 5'; Thitipan (yellow card) 77'	Report	Diogo 9'; Supachok 53'; Sasalak (yellow card) 62'; Jakkaphan (yellow card) 70'; Siwarak (yellow card) 87'; Túñez (yellow card) 90'	Stadium: Leo Stadium; Attendance: 8,379; Referee: Warinthorn Satsadee; Man of the Match: Supachok Sarachat

16 June 2018 19	Buriram United	0–1	Chainat Hornbill	Buriram
20:00 UTC+7	Túñez (yellow card) 73'; Diogo (yellow card) 83'	Report	Pornthep (yellow card) 5'; Marco (yellow card) 44'; Jeera 59'; Chatchai (yellow card) 73'	Stadium: Chang Arena; Attendance: 7,289; Referee: Sarayut Chakngoen

24 June 2018 20	Prachuap	1–2	Buriram United	Prachuap Khiri Khan
18:00 UTC+7	Sutee (yellow card) 31'; Reis 54'; Adun (yellow card) 66'; Wanchalerm (yellow card) 67'	Report	Pansa 28', (yellow card) 83' (yellow-red card) 90+3'; Diogo 39' (pen.), (yellow card) 90+1'; Jakkaphan (yellow card) 61'	Stadium: Sam Ao Stadium; Attendance: 4,979; Referee: Panumat Santhamo; Man of the Match: Diogo Luís Santo

30 June 2018 21	Buriram United	2–1	Bangkok United	Buriram
19:00 UTC+7	Korrakot 24'; Suchao (yellow card) 28'; Anuwat (yellow card) 79'; Sasalak 87'; Siwarak (yellow card) 90+1'	Report	Robson 5'; Everton (yellow card) 26'; Teeratep (yellow card) 36'; Putthinan (yellow card) 60'; Anthony (yellow card) 61'; Bihr (yellow card) 77'; Vander Luiz (yellow card) 89'	Stadium: Chang Arena; Attendance: 14,154; Referee: Torpong Somsing; Man of the Match: Sasalak Haiprakhon

7 July 2018 22	Navy	0–4	Buriram United	Sattahip, Chonburi
20:00 UTC+7		Report	Diogo 11' (pen.), 15', 57'; Chitipat (yellow card) 45+1'; Pansa 66'; Supachai (yellow card) 82'	Stadium: Sattahip Navy Stadium; Attendance: 4,903; Referee: Chairurk Ngamsom; Man of the Match: Diogo Luís Santo

14 July 2018 23	Buriram United	2–1	Ubon UMT United	Buriram
19:00 UTC+7	Narubadin 10'; Diogo 40', (yellow card) 88'; Ratthanakorn (yellow card) 76'	Report	Apiwat 5'	Stadium: Chang Arena; Attendance: 8,446; Referee: Natee Chusuwan; Man of the Match: Diogo Luís Santo

22 July 2018 24	Chonburi	0–2	Buriram United	Mueang Chonburi, Chonburi
19:00 UTC+7	Gyeong-min (yellow card) 3'; Wattanasap (yellow card) 34'	Report	Diogo 14'; Korrakot (yellow card) 18'; Jakkaphan 38'	Stadium: Chonburi Stadium; Attendance: 7,801; Referee: Anusorn Nukaew; Man of the Match: Diogo Luís Santo

28 July 2018 25	Buriram United	2–1	Suphanburi	Buriram
19:00 UTC+7	Túñez 2'; Osvaldo (yellow card) 32'; Diogo 62' (pen.); Supachai (yellow card) 85'	Report	Suban (yellow card) 24'; Anderson (yellow card) 42'; Wasan (yellow card) 45+2'; Thanasit 52'	Stadium: Chang Arena; Attendance: 20,712; Referee: Arkhom Charoensuk; Man of the Match: Diogo Luís Santo

5 August 2018 26	Port	2–2	Buriram United	Khlong Toei, Bangkok
18:00 UTC+7	Anont (yellow card) 30'; Pakorn 41'; Sung-hwan 52'	Report	Diogo 26', 31'; Chitipat (yellow card) 51'; Ratthanakorn (yellow card) 68'; Suchao (yellow card) 90+2'	Stadium: PAT Stadium; Attendance: 6,131; Referee: Warinthorn Satsadee; Man of the Match: Diogo Luís Santo

5 September 2018 27	Buriram United	1–0	Chiangrai United	Buriram
19:00 UTC+7	Suchao (yellow card) 45+1'; Diogo 78'; Chitipat (yellow card) 88'	Report	Cardozo (yellow card) 26'; Chaiyawat (yellow card) 44'; Rosimar (yellow card) 46'	Stadium: Chang Arena; Attendance: 10,533; Referee: Natee Chusuwan; Man of the Match: Diogo Luís Santo

8 September 2018 28	Nakhon Ratchasima	0–2	Buriram United	Nakhon Ratchasima
19:00 UTC+7	Chalermpong (yellow card) 79'	Report	Diogo 32', 64'	Stadium: 80th Birthday Stadium; Attendance: 15,679; Referee: Natee Chusuwan; Man of the Match: Diogo Luís Santo

12 September 2018 29	Buriram United	4–1	Sukhothai	Buriram
19:00 UTC+7	Jun-soo (yellow card) 12'; Osvaldo 19'; Supachai 30', 45+3'; Patiño 71'	Report	Bonilla 13' (pen.)	Stadium: Chang Arena; Attendance: 6,873; Referee: Witsawet Sangnakhon; Man of the Match: Diogo Luís Santo

16 September 2018 30	SCG Muangthong United	0–3	Buriram United	Pak Kret, Nonthaburi
19:00 UTC+7	Jajá (yellow card) 12'; Heberty (yellow card) 19', (penalty missed) 90'	Report	Chitipat (yellow card) 5'; Korrakot 39'; Jakkaphan (yellow card) 65'; Osvaldo 69'; Jun-soo 90+3'	Stadium: SCG Stadium; Attendance: 12,721; Referee: Arkhom Charoensuk; Man of the Match: Osvaldo Filho

22 September 2018 31	Buriram United	2–0	Police Tero	Buriram
20:00 UTC+7	Diogo 10', (penalty missed) 28'; Jakkaphan (yellow card) 63'; Ratthanakorn (yellow card) 63'; Korrakot 74'	Report	Narong (yellow card) 19'; Niran (yellow card) 69'; Chumpol (yellow card) 75'; Michaël (yellow card) 86'	Stadium: Chang Arena; Attendance: 10,021; Referee: Chairurk Ngamsom; Man of the Match: Diogo Luís Santo

29 September 2018 32	Buriram United	3–0	Pattaya United	Buriram
18:00 UTC+7	Sasalak 23', (yellow card) 86'; Supachai (yellow card) 45'; Patiño 72'; Diogo 90' (pen.)	Report	Sarawut (yellow card) 16'; Surachet (yellow card) 19'; Chayawat (yellow card) 68'	Stadium: Chang Arena; Attendance: 35,573; Referee: Torpong Somsing; Man of the Match: Sasalak Haiprakhon

3 October 2018 33	Air Force Central	2–4	Buriram United	Lam Luk Ka, Pathum Thani
18:00 UTC+7	Houla (yellow card) 39'; Vincent 50', 57'; Watcharapong (yellow card) 70'	Report	Diogo 41', 54', 74'; Suchao (yellow card) 61'; Ratthanakorn (yellow card) 79'; Patiño 90+4'	Stadium: Thupatemi Stadium; Attendance: 2,489; Referee: Warinthorn Satsadee; Man of the Match: Diogo Luís Santo

7 October 2018 34	Ratchaburi Mitr Phol	0–1	Buriram United	Ratchaburi
18:00 UTC+7	Chutipol (yellow card) 45+3'	Report	Patiño 10'; Diogo (yellow card) 42'; Korrakot (yellow card) 90+1'; Siwarak (yellow card) 90+3'	Stadium: Mitr Phol Stadium; Attendance: 7,747; Referee: Sarayuth Jakngern; Man of the Match: Supachai Jaided

=== FA Cup ===
27 June 2018 First round	Buriram United	0–0 (a.e.t.) (8–7 p)	Bangkok United	Buriram
18:00 UTC+7	Jakkaphan (yellow card) 89'; Sasalak (yellow card) 90'; Korrakot (yellow card) 99'	Report	Sanrawat (yellow card) 86'; Sumanya (yellow card) 90+1'	Stadium: Chang Arena; Attendance: 6,472; Referee: Thitichai Nuanchan
	Penalties
	Diogo (penalty scored); Túñez (penalty scored); Osvaldo (penalty scored); Pansa (penalty missed); Siwarak (penalty scored); Jun-soo (penalty scored); Sasalak (penalty scored); Jakkaphan (penalty scored); Narubadin (penalty scored)		(penalty scored) Robson; (penalty missed) Vander Luiz; (penalty scored) Sanrawat; (penalty scored) Everton; (penalty scored) Bihr; (penalty scored) Ekkachai; (penalty scored) Sathaporn; (penalty scored) Sieghart; (penalty missed) Sumanya

4 July 2018 Second round	Buriram United	6–0	Lampang	Buriram
18:00 UTC+7	Supachai 12', 73', 87'; Korrakot (yellow card) 39'; Jakkaphan 66', 90+3'; Diogo 81' (pen.)	Report	Ronnapee Choeykamdee (yellow card) 28'; Keeratikorn Nilmart (yellow card) 71'	Stadium: Chang Arena; Attendance: 5,941; Referee: Warinthorn Satsadee; Man of the Match: Supachai Jaided

25 July 2018 Third round	Nakhon Pathom United	1–2 (a.e.t.)	Buriram United	Nakhon Pathom
19:00 UTC+7	Diego Silva 78'; Lesley Ablorh (yellow card) 90+3'; Raungchai Choothongchai (yellow card) 105'	Report	Supachai 19'; Herd (yellow card) 22'; Supachok 114'	Stadium: Nakhon Pathom Municipality Sport School Stadium; Attendance: 2,683; Referee: Sivakorn Pu-udom; Man of the Match: Supachok Sarachat

1 August 2018 Quarter-finals	Port	1–3	Buriram United	Khlong Toei, Bangkok
19:00 UTC+7	Pakorn 66', (yellow card) 87'; Elias (yellow card) 77'; Sung-hwan (yellow card) 90+4'	Report	Pansa 16'; Supachai 17'; Rochela 39' (o.g.)	Stadium: PAT Stadium; Attendance: 5,519; Referee: Chairurk Ngamsom

26 September 2018 Semi-finals	Sisaket	1–2	Buriram United	Lak Si, Bangkok
19:00 UTC+7	Soukaphone	Report	Patiño; Pansa	Stadium: Boonyachinda Stadium

27 October 2018 Final	Chiangrai United	3–2	Buriram United	Pathum Wan, Bangkok
19:00 UTC+7	Rosimar x3	Report	Osvaldo; Diogo (pen.); Sasalak Haiprakhon (yellow card) (yellow-red card)	Stadium: Suphachalasai Stadium; Referee: Torpong Somsing

=== League Cup ===
13 June 2018 First round	Lampang	1–3	Buriram United	Lampang
19:00 UTC+7	Melvin 31'; Suwat Junboonpha (yellow card) 53'; Siriwat Sinthurak (yellow card) 77'	Report	Patiño 5'; Sasalak 51'; Osvaldo (penalty missed) 78'; Supachok 80'; Túñez (yellow card) 82'	Stadium: Lampang Province Stadium; Attendance: 5,097; Referee: Ketdamrong Khemthong; Man of the Match: Sasalak Haiprakhon

11 July 2018 Second round	Trang	0–1 (a.e.t.)	Buriram United	Trang
18:00 UTC+7	Eakkapong Torchum (yellow card) 37'; Tetsuro Inoue (yellow card) 52'; Nuttawut Chanachan (yellow card) 107'; Nattha Thongrod (yellow card) 114'	Report	Herd (yellow card) 20'; Korrakot (yellow card) 90+2'; Diogo 116'	Stadium: Trang Municipality Stadium; Attendance: 6,132; Referee: Pairoj Bunkamnoed

8 August 2018 Quarter-finals	Buriram United	4–1	Ubon UMT United	Buriram
18:00 UTC+7	Patiño 39'; Diogo 57', 62'; Supachok (yellow card) 88', (goal) 90'	Report	Pansa 16' (o.g.); Brinner (yellow card) 65'; Athatcha (yellow card) 72'	Stadium: Chang Arena; Attendance: 7,669; Referee: Natee Choosuwan; Man of the Match: Diogo Luís Santo

19 September 2018 Semi-finals	Buriram United	1–2	Bangkok Glass	Lak Si, Bangkok
19:00 UTC+7	Diogo 18' (pen.), (yellow card) 83'; Chitipat (yellow card) 38'; Ratthanakorn (yellow card) 79'	Report	Surachat 12'; Korraphat (yellow card) 17'; Chalermsak (yellow card) 45'; David Bala 84'; Thitipan (yellow card) 89'	Stadium: Boonyachinda Stadium; Attendance: 3,012; Referee: Sivakorn Pu-udom

=== AFC Champions League ===
Buriram United qualified for the group stage of the 2018 AFC Champions League due to finishing champion in the 2017 Thai League.

==== Group stage ====
Buriram United is staying on group G, with Guangzhou Evergrande (2017 Chinese Super League champion), Jeju United (2017 K League Classic runners-up), and Cerezo Osaka (2017 J.League Cup champion).

Pos	Team	Pld	W	D	L	GF	GA	GD	Pts	Qualification	GZE	BUR	CER	JEJ
1	(China) Guangzhou Evergrande	6	3	3	0	12	6	+6	12	Advance to knockout stage	—	1–1	3–1	5–3
2	(Thailand) Buriram United	6	2	3	1	7	6	+1	9	Advance to knockout stage	1–1	—	2–0	0–2
3	(Japan) Cerezo Osaka	6	2	2	2	6	8	−2	8		0–0	2–2	—	2–1
4	(South Korea) Jeju United	6	1	0	5	6	11	−5	3		0–2	0–1	0–1	—

Source: AFC
Rules for classification: Group stage tiebreakers

14 February 2018 1	Guangzhou Evergrande (China)	1–1	(Thailand) Buriram United	Guangzhou, China
17:00 UTC+8	Goulart 16'	Report	Edgar 57'	Stadium: Tianhe Stadium; Attendance: 28,893; Referee: Ravshan Irmatov (Uzbekistan)

21 February 2018 2	Buriram United (Thailand)	0–2	(South Korea) Jeju United	Buriram, Thailand
18:00 UTC+7		Report	Lee Chang-min 2'; Cruz 21' (pen.)	Stadium: Chang Arena; Attendance: 10,041; Referee: Khamis Al-Marri (Qatar)

6 March 2018 3	Buriram United (Thailand)	2–0	(Japan) Cerezo Osaka	Buriram, Thailand
18:00 UTC+7	Túñez 2'; Edgar 54'	Report		Stadium: Chang Arena; Referee: Fahad Al-Mirdasi (Saudi Arabia)

14 March 2018 4	Cerezo Osaka (Japan)	2–2	(Thailand) Buriram United	Osaka, Japan
19:00 UTC+9	Yang Dong-hyun 65'; Sugimoto 88'	Report	Yang Dong-hyun 11' (o.g.); Diogo 71'	Stadium: Kincho Stadium; Attendance: 8,479; Referee: Mohanad Qassim (Iraq)

3 April 2018 5	Buriram United (Thailand)	1–1	(China) Guangzhou Evergrande	Buriram, Thailand
18:00 UTC+7	Yoo Jun-soo 90+2'	Report	Zheng Long 20'	Stadium: Chang Arena; Attendance: 10,533; Referee: Mohammed Abdulla Hassan Mohamed (United Arab Emirates)

17 April 2018 6	Jeju United (South Korea)	0–1	(Thailand) Buriram United	Seogwipo, South Korea
20:00 UTC+9		Report	Korrakot	Stadium: Jeju World Cup Stadium; Attendance: 1,355; Referee: Alireza Faghani (Iran)

==== Knockout stage ====
Round of 16

8 May 2018 Round of 16 (1st leg)	Buriram United (Thailand)	3–2	(South Korea) Jeonbuk Hyundai Motors	Buriram, Thailand
18:00 UTC+7	Edgar 6', 69'; Diogo 60'	Report	Lopes 50'; Son Jun-ho 90+1'	Stadium: Chang Arena; Attendance: 10,382; Referee: Khamis Al-Marri (Qatar)

15 May 2018 Round of 16 (2nd leg)	Jeonbuk Hyundai Motors (South Korea)	2–0 (4–3 agg.)	(Thailand) Buriram United	Jeonju, South Korea
19:00 UTC+9	Lopes 18'; Lee Jae-sung II 84'	Report		Stadium: Jeonju World Cup Stadium; Attendance: 11,218; Referee: Nawaf Shukralla (Bahrain)

== Statistics ==
=== Appearances ===
No.	Pos.	Name	League		FA Cup		League Cup		Champions Cup		AFC Champion League		Total		Discipline	
No.	Pos.	Name	Apps	Goals	Apps	Goals	Apps	Goals	Apps	Goals	Apps	Goals	Apps	Goals	Yellow card	Red card
1	GK	(Thailand) Siwarak Tedsungnoen	17	0	0	0	0	0	1	0	7	0	0	0	0	0
3	DF	(Thailand) Pansa Hemviboon	15+1	1	0	0	0	0	1	0	6	0	0	0	1	0
4	DF	(Thailand) Pravinwat Boonyong	12+1	0	0	0	0	0	0	0	7	0	0	0	4	0
5	DF	(Venezuela) Andrés Túñez	13	2	0	0	0	0	1	0	6	1	0	0	0	0
6	MF	(Thailand) Sasalak Haiprakhon	11+3	0	0	0	0	0	0	0	2+4	0	0	0	2	0
7	MF	(Thailand) Anon Amornlerdsak	1+9	0	0	0	0	0	0+1	0	0+2	0	0	0	1	0
8	MF	(Thailand) Suchao Nuchnum	12+3	0	0	0	0	0	1	0	2	0	0	0	0	0
9	FW	(Thailand) Supachai Jaided	3+12	0	0	0	0	0	0+1	0	1+4	0	0	0	1	0
10	MF	(Thailand) Jakkaphan Kaewprom	14+3	2	0	0	0	0	1	0	5	0	0	0	1	1
11	DF	(Thailand) Korrakot Wiriyaudomsiri	13+3	2	0	0	0	0	1	0	7	1	0	0	2	0
13	DF	(Thailand) Narubadin Weerawatnodom	7+1	0	0	0	0	0	0	0	5	0	0	0	1	0
14	DF	(Thailand) Chitipat Tanklang	0	0	0	0	0	0	0	0	0	0	0	0	0	0
16	MF	(South Korea) Yoo Jun-soo	15+2	3	0	0	0	0	0	0	7	1	0	0	1	0
17	DF	(Thailand) Ekkaluck Thonghkit	3	0	0	0	0	0	0	0	0+1	0	0	0	0	0
19	MF	(Thailand) Supachok Sarachat	12+4	1	0	0	0	0	1	0	5+2	0	0	0	0	0
20	FW	(Philippines) Javier Patiño	0	0	0	0	0	0	0	0	0	0	0	0	0	0
23	FW	(Brazil) Edgar	15	8	0	0	0	0	1	1	6+1	4	0	0	2	0
26	MF	(Thailand) Ratthanakorn Maikami	10	1	0	0	0	0	1	0	5	0	0	0	2	0
29	GK	(Thailand) Yotsapon Teangdar	0+1	0	0	0	0	0	0	0	0	0	0	0	0	0
33	DF	(Thailand) Sarayut Sompim	0	0	0	0	0	0	0	0	0	0	0	0	0	0
40	FW	(Brazil) Diogo	16	16	0	0	0	0	1	1	6	2	0	0	4	1
49	FW	(Vietnam) Hoàng Vũ Samson	0+2	0	0	0	0	0	0+1	0	0	0	0	0	0	0
50	DF	(Thailand) Kritsana Daokrajai	0	0	0	0	0	0	1	0	0	0	0	0	0	0
54	MF	(Thailand) Suphanat Mueanta	0+3	2	0	0	0	0	0	0	0	0	0	0	0	0
99	GK	(Thailand) Kevin Sangsamanan	0	0	0	0	0	0	0	0	0	0	0	0	0	0
—	—	Own goals	–	0	–	0	–	0	–	0	–	1	–	1	–	–

=== Goalscorers ===
Includes all competitive matches. The list is sorted by shirt number when total goals are equal.

Correct as of match played on 27 October 2018

Left club during season

No.	Pos.	Player	Thai League	FA Cup	League Cup	Champions Cup	Champions League	TOTAL
1	40	(Brazil) Diogo	34	2	4	1	2	43
2	23	(Brazil) Edgar	8	0	0	1	4	13
3	9	(Thailand) Supachai Jaided	2	5	0	0	0	7
3	20	(Philippines) Javier Patiño	4	1	2	0	0	7
5	11	(Thailand) Korrakot Wiriyaudomsiri	5	0	0	0	1	6
6	3	(Thailand) Pansa Hemviboon	3	2	0	0	0	5
6	10	(Thailand) Jakkaphan Kaewprom	3	2	0	0	0	5
6	16	(South Korea) Yoo Jun-soo	4	0	0	0	1	5
6	19	(Thailand) Supachok Sarachat	2	1	2	0	0	5
10	5	(Venezuela) Andrés Túñez	3	0	0	0	1	4
11	6	(Thailand) Sasalak Haiprakhon	2	0	1	0	0	3
11	17	(Brazil) Osvaldo	2	1	0	0	0	3
13	54	(Thailand) Suphanat Mueanta	2	0	0	0	0	2
14	13	(Thailand) Narubadin Weerawatnodom	1	0	0	0	0	1
14	26	(Thailand) Ratthanakorn Maikami	1	0	0	0	0	1
Own Goals			0	1	0	0	1	2
Totals			76	15	9	2	10	112

=== Clean sheets ===
The list is sorted by shirt number when total clean sheets are equal. Numbers in parentheses represent games where both goalkeepers participated and both kept a clean sheet; the number in parentheses is awarded to the goalkeeper who was substituted on, whilst a full clean sheet is awarded to the goalkeeper who was on the field at the start of play.

Correct as of match played on 27 October 2018

No.	Player	Match played	Thai League	FA Cup	League Cup	Champions League	Champions Cup	TOTAL
1	(Thailand) Siwarak Tedsungnoen	49	14	1	0	2	0	17
29	(Thailand) Yotsapon Teangdar	4 (1)	0 (1)	1	1	0	0	2 (1)
Totals			14	2	1	2	0	19
