= 2018 Thai League 1 =

Thai League 1
- Season: 2018
- Dates: 9 February 2018 – 7 October 2018
- Champions: Buriram United
- Relegated: Bangkok Glass; Police Tero; Navy; Ubon UMT United; Air Force Central
- Qualified to 2019 ACL: Buriram United (group stage); Bangkok United (preliminary round 2); Chiangrai United (preliminary round 2)
- Matches: 306
- Goals: 936 (3.06 per match)
- Top goalscorer: Diogo (34 goals)
- Biggest home win: 6 goals difference Port 7–1 Navy (20 May 2018)
- Biggest away win: 5 goals difference Navy 0–5 Port (29 September 2018)
- Highest scoring: 11 goals Bangkok Glass 7–4 Chonburi (1 July 2018)
- Longest winning run: 11 matches Bangkok United
- Longest unbeaten run: 15 matches Buriram United
- Longest winless run: 15 matches Ubon UMT United
- Longest losing run: 11 matches Air Force Central
- Highest attendance: 35,573; Buriram United 3–0 Pattaya United (29 September 2018)
- Lowest attendance: 884; Navy 0–5 Port (29 September 2018)
- Total attendance: 1,366,497
- Average attendance: 4,466
- All statistics correct as of 27 October 2018.

The 2018 Thai League 1 is the 22nd season of the Thai League 1, the top Thai professional league for association football clubs, since its establishment in 1996, also known as Toyota Thai League due to the sponsorship deal with Toyota Motor Thailand. A total of 18 teams will compete in the league. The season began on 9 February 2018 and is scheduled to conclude on 7 October 2018.

Buriram United are the defending champions, while Chainat Hornbill, Air Force Central and Prachuap have entered as the promoted teams from the 2017 Thai League 2.

The 1st transfer window is from 14 November 2017 to 5 February 2018 while the 2nd transfer window is from 1 June 2018 to 29 June 2018.

== Changes from last season ==
=== Team changes ===
==== Promoted clubs ====
Promoted from the 2017 Thai League 2

- Chainat Hornbill
- Air Force Central
- Prachuap

==== Relegated clubs ====
Relegated from the 2017 Thai League

- Thai Honda Ladkrabang
- Sisaket
- Super Power Samut Prakan

==== Renamed clubs ====
- Super Power Samut Prakan authorize from Jumpasri United
- Prachuap was renamed to PT Prachuap

== Teams ==
Locations of the 2018 Thai League teams
Football clubs in Bangkok Metropolitan Region

=== Stadium and locations ===
Note: Table lists in alphabetical order.

Team	Province	Stadium	Capacity	Ref.
Air Force Central	Pathum Thani	Thupatemi Stadium	20,000	
Bangkok Glass	Pathum Thani	Leo Stadium	13,000	
Bangkok United	Pathum Thani	Thammasat Stadium	25,000	
Buriram United	Buriram	Chang Arena	32,600	
Chiangrai United	Chiangrai	Singha Stadium	11,354	
Chainat Hornbill	Chainat	Khao Plong Stadium	12,000	
Chonburi	Chonburi	Chonburi Stadium	8,680	
SCG Muangthong United	Nonthaburi	SCG Stadium	14,890	
Nakhon Ratchasima	Nakhon Ratchasima	80th Birthday Stadium	24,641	
Navy	Chonburi	Sattahip Navy Stadium	6,000	
Pattaya United	Chonburi	Nong Prue Stadium	5,500	
Police Tero	Bangkok	Boonyachinda Stadium	3,550	
Port	Bangkok	PAT Stadium	7,000	
PT Prachuap	Prachuap Khiri Khan	Sam Ao Stadium	2,700	
Ratchaburi Mitr Phol	Ratchaburi	Mitr Phol Stadium	10,000	
Sukhothai	Sukhothai	Thung Thalay Luang Stadium	8,000	
Suphanburi	Suphanburi	Suphan Buri Provincial Stadium	25,000	
Ubon UMT United	Ubon Ratchathani	UMT Stadium	6,000	

Notes
Bangkok United used the Rajamangala National Stadium for their round 8 tie against Chiangrai United

=== Personnel and sponsoring ===
Note: Flags indicate national team as has been defined under FIFA eligibility rules. Players may hold more than one non-FIFA nationality.

Team	Head coach	Captain	Kit manufacturer	Main sponsor
Air Force Central	(Wales) Jason Brown	(Thailand) Tana Sripandorn	KELA	Central Group
Bangkok Glass	(Thailand) Anurak Srikerd	(Australia) Matt Smith	Nike	Leo Beer
Bangkok United	(Brazil) Alexandré Pölking	(Thailand) Anthony Ampaipitakwong	Ari	True
Buriram United	(Montenegro) Božidar Bandović	(Thailand) Suchao Nuchnum	Made by club (Domestic); Warrix (Asia)	Chang
Chainat Hornbill	(Germany) Dennis Amato	(France) Florent Sinama Pongolle	Warrix	Wangkanai
Chiangrai United	(Brazil) Alexandre Gama	(Brazil) Victor Cardozo	Puma	Singha Park
Chonburi	(Thailand) Jukkapant Punpee	(Thailand) Chonlatit Jantakam	Nike	Chang
Muangthong United	(Serbia) Radovan Ćurčić	(Thailand) Sarach Yooyen	Grand Sport	SCG
Nakhon Ratchasima	(Serbia) Miloš Joksić	(Thailand) Chalermpong Kerdkaew	Warrix	Mazda
Navy	(Serbia) Ljubomir Ristovski	(Thailand) Nattaporn Phanrit	Made by club	EA Aviation
Pattaya United	(Thailand) Surapong Kongthep	(South Korea) Lee Won-young	Ari	Sanwa
Police Tero	(Thailand) Rangsan Viwatchaichok	(France) Michaël N'dri	FBT	Chang
Port	(Thailand) Jadet Meelarp	(Spain) David Rochela	Grand Sport	Muang Thai
PT Prachuap	(Thailand) Thawatchai Damrong-Ongtrakul	(Thailand) Adul Muensamaan	Warrix	PTG
Ratchaburi Mitr Phol	(Tunisia) Lassaad Chabbi	(Thailand) Chutipol Thongthae	Made by club	Mitr Phol
Sukhothai	(Thailand) Chalermwoot Sa-ngapol	(Thailand) Yuttapong Srilakorn	Mawin	Chang
Suphanburi	(Thailand) Pairoj Borwonwatanadilok	(Thailand) Sinthaweechai Hathairattanakool	Warrix	Chang
Ubon Umt United	(Japan) Sugao Kambe	(Thailand) Antonio Verzura	Eureka	UMT

Notes
Gilberto Macena is the official captain of Chiangrai United, but due to his season long injury, Victor Cardozo and Atit Daosawang filled in as captain for Chiangrai United.

=== Managerial changes ===
- Indicate the positions in the relegation zone.

Team	Outgoing manager	Manner of departure	Date of vacancy	Week	Table	Incoming manager
Chainat Hornbill	(Germany) Dennis Amato	End of contract	11 October 2017	Pre-season		(Croatia) Drago Mamić
Ratchaburi Mitr Phol	(Spain) Pacheta	End of contract	13 November 2017	Pre-season		(Germany) Christian Ziege
Ubon UMT United	(England) Scott Cooper	Resigned	15 November 2017	Pre-season		(Finland) Mixu Paatelainen
Bangkok Glass	(Thailand) Surachai Jaturapattarapong	End of caretaker role	18 November 2017	Pre-season		(Spain) Josep Ferré
Chonburi	(Thailand) Therdsak Chaiman	Resigned	19 November 2017	Pre-season		(Germany) Goran Barjaktarević
Chainat Hornbill	(Croatia) Drago Mamić	Mutual consent	13 February 2018	1	9	(Germany) Dennis Amato
Ratchaburi Mitr Phol	(Germany) Christian Ziege	Mutual consent	22 February 2018	2	9	(Belgium) René Desaeyere
Muangthong United	(Thailand) Totchtawan Sripan	Resigned	12 March 2018	5	10	(Serbia) Radovan Ćurčić
Ratchaburi	(Belgium) René Desaeyere	Mutual consent	15 March 2018	5	16	(Tunisia) Lassaad Chabbi
Bangkok Glass	(Spain) Josep Ferré	Sacked	29 March 2018	7	13	(Thailand) Anurak Srikerd
Police Tero	(England) Scott Cooper	Sacked	30 March 2018	7	17	(Thailand) Rangsan Viwatchaichok
Air Force Central	(Thailand) Sasom Pobprasert	Resigned	31 March 2018	8	18	(Australia) Andrew Ord
Chonburi	(Germany) Goran Barjaktarević	Mutual consent	3 April 2018	8	11	(Thailand) Jukkapant Punpee
Navy	(Thailand) Wiriya Paopan	Sacked	3 April 2018	8	13	(Thailand) Chamnan Praekuntod
Navy	(Thailand) Chamnan Praekuntod	Resigned	11 April 2018	10	15	(Thailand) Natipong Sritong-In
Ubon UMT United	(Finland) Mixu Paatelainen	Sacked	21 April 2018	11	17	(Japan) Sugao Kambe
Navy	(Thailand) Natipong Sritong-In	Sacked	7 May 2018	14	16	(Serbia) Ljubomir Ristovski
Sukhothai	(Thailand) Pairoj Borwonwatanadilok	Mutual consent	20 May 2018	16	10	(Thailand) Chalermwoot Sa-ngapol
Air Force Central	(Australia) Andrew Ord	Resigned	4 June 2018	17	18	(Wales) Jason Brown
Suphanburi	(Nigeria) Adebayo Gbadebo	Resigned	23 June 2018	20	11	(Thailand) Pairoj Borwonwatanadilok
Police Tero	(Thailand) Rangsan Viwatchaichok	Move to Assistant Coach	29 June 2018	20	12	(Thailand) Totchtawan Sripan
Police Tero	(Thailand) Totchtawan Sripan	Resigned	13 September 2018	29	14	(Thailand) Rangsan Viwatchaichok

=== Foreign players ===
Other foreign players.
AFC quota players.
ASEAN quota players.
No foreign player registered.

A T1 team could registered five foreign players by at least one player from AFC member countries and at least one player from ASEAN member countries. A team can use four foreign players on the field in each game, including at least one player from the AFC member countries or ASEAN member countries (3+1).

Note :
(substituted off) : players who released during summer transfer window;
(substituted in) : players who registered during summer transfer window;
↔: players who have dual nationality by half-caste or naturalization.
→: players who left club after registered during first or second leg.

Club	Leg	Player 1	Player 2	Player 3	Player 4	Player 5
Air Force Central	1st	(Brazil) Renan Marques (substituted off)	(Brazil) Leandro Assumpção (substituted off)	(Croatia) Aleksandar Kapisoda	(Nigeria) ↔ (Bahrain) Jaycee John	(Czech Republic) ↔ (Vietnam) Michal Nguyễn
Air Force Central	2nd	(France) Greg Houla (substituted in)	(Japan) ↔ (New Zealand) Kayne Vincent (substituted in)	(Croatia) Aleksandar Kapisoda	(Nigeria) ↔ (Bahrain) Jaycee John	(Czech Republic) ↔ (Vietnam) Michal Nguyễn
Bangkok Glass	1st	(Spain) ↔ (Malaysia) Kiko Insa (substituted off)	(France) ↔ (Guinea-Bissau) Frédéric Mendy (substituted off)	(Serbia) ↔ (North Macedonia) Mario Gjurovski (substituted off)	(Spain) Toti	(England) ↔ (Australia) Matt Smith
Bangkok Glass	2nd		(Brazil) David Bala (substituted in)	(Costa Rica) Ariel Rodríguez (substituted in)	(Spain) Toti	(England) ↔ (Australia) Matt Smith
Bangkok United	1st	(Argentina) ↔ (Palestine) Carlos Salom (substituted off)	(Brazil) Vander	(Brazil) Everton	(Brazil) Robson	(Denmark) ↔ (Philippines) Michael Falkesgaard
Bangkok United	2nd	(Iran) Mehrdad Pooladi (substituted in)	(Brazil) Vander	(Brazil) Everton	(Brazil) Robson	(Denmark) ↔ (Philippines) Michael Falkesgaard
Buriram United	1st	(Brazil) Edgar (substituted off)	(Nigeria) ↔ (Vietnam) Hoàng Vũ Samson (substituted off) →	(Brazil) Diogo	(Spain) ↔ (Venezuela) Andrés Túñez	(South Korea) Yoo Jun-soo
Buriram United	2nd	(Brazil) Osvaldo (substituted in)	(Spain) ↔ (Philippines) Javier Patiño (substituted in)	(Brazil) Diogo	(Spain) ↔ (Venezuela) Andrés Túñez	(South Korea) Yoo Jun-soo
Chainat Hornbill	1st		(South Korea) Park Jong-oh (substituted off)	(Ivory Coast) Bireme Diouf	(Ivory Coast) Bernard Doumbia	(France) Florent Sinama Pongolle
Chainat Hornbill	2nd	(Nigeria) ↔ (Philippines) Chima Uzoka (substituted in)	(Japan) Ryutaro Karube (substituted in)	(Ivory Coast) Bireme Diouf	(Ivory Coast) Bernard Doumbia	(France) Florent Sinama Pongolle
Chiangrai United	1st	(Brazil) Cleiton Silva (substituted off)	(Germany) ↔ (Kosovo) Bajram Nebihi (substituted off)	(Brazil) Victor	(South Korea) Lee Yong-rae	(Myanmar) Kyaw Ko Ko
Chiangrai United	2nd	(Brazil) Bill (substituted in)	(Brazil) William Henrique (substituted in)	(Brazil) Victor	(South Korea) Lee Yong-rae	(Myanmar) Kyaw Ko Ko
Chonburi	1st	(Brazil) Marclei Santos (substituted off)	(Ghana) Prince Amponsah (substituted off)	(Brazil) Ciro	(South Korea) Kim Gyeong-min	(Singapore) Zulfahmi Arifin
Chonburi	2nd	(Brazil) Matheus Alves (substituted in)	(Germany) ↔ (Kosovo) Bajram Nebihi (substituted in)	(Brazil) Ciro	(South Korea) Kim Gyeong-min	(Singapore) Zulfahmi Arifin
Nakhon Ratchasima Mazda	1st		(Brazil) Paulo Rangel (substituted off)	(Ghana) Dominic Adiyiah (substituted off)	(Brazil) Antonio Pina	(South Korea) Lee Won-jae
Nakhon Ratchasima Mazda	2nd	(Malaysia) Shahrel Fikri (substituted in)	(Brazil) Leandro Assumpção (substituted in)	(Serbia) Nebojša Marinković (substituted in)	(Brazil) Antonio Pina	(South Korea) Lee Won-jae
Navy	1st	(Brazil) Rodrigo Vergilio (substituted off)	(South Korea) Bang Seung-hwan (substituted off)	(Brazil) Vitor Júnior	(Ivory Coast) Amadou Ouattara	(Singapore) Gabriel Quak
Navy	2nd	(Brazil) Caion (substituted in)	(South Korea) Kim Hyung-il (substituted in)	(Brazil) Vitor Júnior	(Ivory Coast) Amadou Ouattara	(Singapore) Gabriel Quak
Pattaya United	1st	(Brazil) Rafinha (substituted off)	(Brazil) Lukian	(South Korea) Kim Tae-yeon	(South Korea) Lee Won-young	(Japan) ↔ (Philippines) Hikaru Minegishi
Pattaya United	2nd	(Brazil) Carlão (substituted in)	(Brazil) Lukian	(South Korea) Kim Tae-yeon	(South Korea) Lee Won-young	(Japan) ↔ (Philippines) Hikaru Minegishi
Police Tero	1st	(Brazil) Douglas Tanque (substituted off)	(Brazil) Marcos Vinícius	(Ivory Coast) ↔ (France) Michaël N'dri	(South Korea) Lee Jeong-geun	(Myanmar) Aung Thu
Police Tero	2nd	(Serbia) Nikola Petković (substituted in)	(Brazil) Marcos Vinícius	(Ivory Coast) ↔ (France) Michaël N'dri	(South Korea) Lee Jeong-geun	(Myanmar) Aung Thu
Port	1st	(Spain) Sergio Suárez	(Spain) David Rochela	(Montenegro) Dragan Boškovic	(South Korea) Kim Sung-hwan	(Indonesia) Terens Puhiri
Port	2nd	(Spain) Sergio Suárez	(Spain) David Rochela	(Montenegro) Dragan Boškovic	(South Korea) Kim Sung-hwan	(Indonesia) Terens Puhiri
PT Prachuap	1st	(Brazil) Jonatan Reis	(France) ↔ (Guinea) Lonsana Doumbouya	(Montenegro) Adnan Orahovac	(South Korea) Kwon Dae-hee	(Myanmar) Nanda Lin Kyaw Chit
PT Prachuap	2nd	(Brazil) Jonatan Reis	(France) ↔ (Guinea) Lonsana Doumbouya	(Montenegro) Adnan Orahovac	(South Korea) Kwon Dae-hee	(Myanmar) Nanda Lin Kyaw Chit
Ratchaburi Mitr Phol	1st		(Brazil) Felipe Menezes (substituted off)	(Brazil) Bill (substituted off)	(France) ↔ (Democratic Republic of the Congo) Joël Sami	(United States) ↔ (South Korea) Kang Soo-il
Ratchaburi Mitr Phol	2nd	(England) ↔ (Philippines) Mark Hartmann (substituted in)	(Guinea-Bissau) ↔ (Portugal) Yannick Djaló (substituted in)	(Lithuania) Nerijus Valskis (substituted in)	(France) ↔ (Democratic Republic of the Congo) Joël Sami	(United States) ↔ (South Korea) Kang Soo-il
SCG Muangthong United	1st	(Brazil) Célio (substituted off)	(Brazil) Jajá Coelho	(Brazil) Heberty	(Japan) Naoaki Aoyama
SCG Muangthong United	2nd	(South Korea) Lee Ho (substituted in)	(Brazil) Jajá Coelho	(Brazil) Heberty	(Japan) Naoaki Aoyama
Sukhothai	1st		(El Salvador) Nelson Bonilla	(Madagascar) Njiva Rakotoharimalala	(Madagascar) John Baggio	(South Korea) Jung Myung-oh
Sukhothai	2nd	(Australia) ↔ (Malaysia) Curran Ferns (substituted in)	(El Salvador) Nelson Bonilla	(Madagascar) Njiva Rakotoharimalala	(Madagascar) John Baggio	(South Korea) Jung Myung-oh
Suphanburi	1st		(Suriname) ↔ (Netherlands) Sylvano Comvalius (substituted off)	(Brazil) Kanu	(Brazil) Rômulo	(Japan) Takafumi Akahoshi
Suphanburi	2nd	(England) ↔ (Philippines) Luke Woodland (substituted in)	(Brazil) Cleiton Silva (substituted in)	(Brazil) Kanu	(Brazil) Rômulo	(Japan) Takafumi Akahoshi
Ubon UMT United	1st	(England) ↔ (Philippines) Mark Hartmann (substituted off)	(Brazil) Rodrigo Paraná (substituted off)	(Portugal) ↔ (Angola) Aguinaldo (substituted off)	(Brazil) Brinner	(Japan) Kenta Yamazaki
Ubon UMT United	2nd		(Serbia) Srđan Dimitrov (substituted in)	(Japan) Seiya Kojima (substituted in)	(Brazil) Brinner	(Japan) Kenta Yamazaki

== League table ==
=== Standings ===
Pos	Team	Pld	W	D	L	GF	GA	GD	Pts	Qualification or relegation
1	Buriram United (C, Q)	34	28	3	3	76	25	+51	87	Qualification to 2019 AFC Champions League Group stage
2	Bangkok United (Q)	34	21	8	5	68	36	+32	71	Qualification to 2019 AFC Champions League Preliminary round 2
3	Port	34	19	4	11	73	45	+28	61	
4	Muangthong United	34	16	11	7	65	53	+12	59	
5	Chiangrai United (Q)	34	15	10	9	52	36	+16	55	Qualification to 2019 AFC Champions League Preliminary round 2 (Note: Chiangrai United qualified to the 2019 AFC Champions League Preliminary round 2 as winners of the 2018 Thai FA Cup.)
6	Prachuap	34	15	8	11	56	46	+10	53	
7	Nakhon Ratchasima	34	13	8	13	36	44	−8	47	
8	Pattaya United	34	13	7	14	50	62	−12	46 (Note: Head-to-head record (Mini league): Pattaya United 10 pts, Chonburi 6 pts, Suphanburi 1 pt.)	
9	Chonburi	34	13	7	14	45	53	−8	46	
10	Suphanburi	34	11	13	10	43	35	+8	46	
11	Sukhothai	34	12	7	15	53	63	−10	43 (Note: Sukhothai ahead on head-to-head record; Sukhothai 4 pts, Ratchaburi Mitr Phol 1 pt.)	
12	Ratchaburi Mitr Phol	34	12	7	15	50	53	−3	43	
13	Chainat Hornbill	34	11	9	14	46	52	−6	42 (Note: Chainat Hornbill ahead on head-to-head record; Chainat Hornbill 4 pts, Bangkok Glass 1 pt.)	
14	Bangkok Glass (R)	34	11	9	14	55	46	+9	42	Relegation to the 2019 Thai League 2
15	Police Tero (R)	34	10	6	18	53	66	−13	36	Relegation to the 2019 Thai League 2
16	Navy (R)	34	7	9	18	44	85	−41	30	Relegation to the 2019 Thai League 2
17	Ubon United (R)	34	6	8	20	39	58	−19	26	Relegation to the 2019 Thai League 2
18	Air Force Central (R)	34	4	4	26	32	78	−46	16	Relegation to the 2019 Thai League 2

Source: Thai League
Rules for classification: 1) Points; 2) Head-to-head points; 3) Head-to-head goals difference; 4) Head-to-head goals scored; 5) Overall goals difference; 6) Overall goals scored; 7) Fair play points; 8) Play-off without extra time;).
(C) Champions; (Q) Qualified for the phase indicated; (R) Relegated

=== Positions by round ===
The table lists the positions of teams after each week of matches. In order to preserve chronological evolvements, any postponed matches are not included in the round at which they were originally scheduled, but added to the full round they were played immediately afterwards. For example, if a match is scheduled for matchday 13, but then postponed and played between days 16 and 17, it will be added to the standings for day 16.

Team ╲ Round	1	2	3	4	5	6	7	8	9	10	11	12	13	14	15	16	17	18	19	20	21	22	23	24	25	26	27	28	29	30	31	32	33	34
Buriram United	4	3	3	1	1	1	1	1	1	1	1	1	1	1	1	1	1	1	2	1	1	1	1	1	1	1	1	1	1	1	1	1	1	1
Bangkok United	11	7	9	5	7	6	7	9	6	3	2	2	2	2	2	2	2	2	1	2	2	2	2	2	2	2	2	2	2	2	2	2	2	2
Port	1	1	1	3	3	3	2	3	5	8	5	7	4	4	4	3	3	3	3	3	3	3	3	3	3	3	3	4	4	4	4	4	3	3
SCG Muangthong United	4	12	6	6	10	7	5	6	3	4	6	4	6	8	6	6	4	4	4	4	4	4	4	5	4	4	4	3	3	3	3	3	4	4
Chiangrai United	5	13	10	12	8	10	12	10	9	6	3	5	11	7	5	5	6	6	6	6	6	6	5	6	5	6	6	6	5	5	5	5	5	5
PT Prachuap	2	11	5	9	5	4	3	2	2	2	4	3	3	3	3	4	5	5	5	5	5	5	6	4	6	5	5	5	6	6	6	6	6	6
Nakhon Ratchasima Mazda	7	10	4	4	4	5	9	5	7	11	7	9	7	9	11	12	11	9	9	10	11	9	8	7	9	8	7	8	8	8	8	10	10	7
Pattaya United	18	8	13	8	6	9	8	8	10	7	11	12	13	13	13	14	15	13	12	14	12	11	11	9	10	7	8	7	7	7	7	7	7	8
Chonburi	16	14	15	14	15	12	10	11	11	12	12	11	10	11	9	8	9	10	8	8	8	7	7	8	8	9	10	9	9	9	9	8	9	9
Suphanburi	10	5	7	10	11	8	6	7	8	10	10	10	8	5	7	9	8	8	10	11	9	12	12	12	14	13	12	13	11	12	11	9	8	10
Sukhothai	5	2	2	2	2	2	4	4	4	5	8	8	5	6	10	10	10	11	14	13	14	14	14	15	13	15	15	15	15	13	12	13	13	11
Ratchaburi Mitr Phol	14	9	11	15	16	13	14	12	12	9	9	6	9	10	8	7	7	7	7	7	7	10	9	10	7	10	9	11	12	11	13	11	11	12
Chainat Hornbill	9	15	17	17	17	17	16	17	17	16	16	15	14	14	14	11	13	14	13	9	10	8	10	11	11	12	14	12	13	14	14	14	14	13
Bangkok Glass	15	18	16	13	9	11	13	14	13	13	14	14	15	15	15	15	14	15	15	15	15	15	15	13	12	11	11	10	10	10	10	12	12	14
Police Tero	12	16	14	16	14	16	17	15	15	14	13	13	12	12	12	13	12	12	11	12	13	13	13	14	15	14	13	14	14	15	15	15	15	15
Navy	8	4	8	11	12	14	11	13	14	15	15	16	16	16	16	16	17	16	16	16	16	16	16	16	16	16	16	16	16	16	16	16	16	16
Ubon UMT United	17	6	12	7	13	15	15	16	16	17	17	17	17	17	17	17	16	17	17	17	17	17	17	17	17	17	17	17	17	17	17	17	17	17
Air Force Central	13	17	18	18	18	18	18	18	18	18	18	18	18	18	18	18	18	18	18	18	18	18	18	18	18	18	18	18	18	18	18	18	18	18

Leader and qualification to the 2019 AFC Champions League Group stage
Qualification to the 2019 AFC Champions League Preliminary round 2
Relegation to the 2019 Thai League 2

Source: Thai League

=== Results by match played ===
Team ╲ Round	1	2	3	4	5	6	7	8	9	10	11	12	13	14	15	16	17	18	19	20	21	22	23	24	25	26	27	28	29	30	31	32	33	34
Buriram United	W	W	W	W	D	W	W	W	D	W	L	W	L	W	W	W	W	W	L	W	W	W	W	W	W	D	W	W	W	W	W	W	W	W
Bangkok United	L	W	D	W	D	W	D	L	W	W	W	W	W	W	W	W	W	W	W	D	L	L	D	W	W	D	W	W	W	W	L	W	D	D
Port	W	W	W	L	W	D	W	L	L	L	W	L	W	W	W	W	W	L	W	W	W	D	L	W	L	D	L	D	L	W	L	W	W	W
SCG Muangthong United	W	L	W	D	L	W	W	D	W	D	D	D	D	L	W	W	W	W	W	W	L	D	D	L	W	D	W	W	W	L	L	W	D	D
Chiangrai United	W	L	D	D	W	L	L	W	W	W	W	L	L	D	W	W	L	W	D	L	W	W	W	L	D	D	L	W	W	D	D	W	D	D
PT Prachuap	W	L	W	L	W	W	D	W	W	L	L	W	L	W	W	L	D	W	D	L	W	W	D	D	L	W	W	L	D	D	D	W	L	L
Nakhon Ratchasima	W	L	W	W	W	L	L	W	L	L	W	L	W	L	L	L	W	D	D	D	D	W	D	W	L	D	W	L	W	L	D	L	D	W
Pattaya United	L	W	L	W	W	L	W	D	L	W	L	D	L	W	L	L	L	W	D	L	W	W	D	W	D	W	L	W	W	L	D	L	D	L
Chonburi	L	D	L	W	L	W	W	L	W	L	D	W	W	L	D	W	L	L	W	W	L	W	D	L	D	L	L	W	D	L	W	W	L	D
Suphanburi	D	W	D	L	D	W	W	D	D	D	D	D	W	W	L	L	D	D	L	L	W	L	D	L	L	D	W	L	W	D	W	W	W	L
Sukhothai	W	W	W	W	L	D	L	W	L	D	L	D	W	L	L	L	W	L	L	L	D	D	D	L	W	L	L	W	L	W	W	L	D	W
Ratchaburi Mitr Phol	L	W	L	L	L	W	L	W	W	W	D	W	D	L	W	W	L	W	L	D	L	L	D	L	W	L	L	L	L	W	D	W	D	L
Chainat Hornbill	D	L	L	L	L	D	W	L	L	W	D	W	W	W	L	W	L	L	W	W	D	W	L	L	D	D	L	D	D	L	W	L	D	W
Bangkok Glass	L	L	D	W	W	L	L	D	W	D	L	L	L	D	W	W	D	L	L	L	W	L	D	W	W	W	L	W	D	D	W	L	D	L
Police Tero	L	L	D	L	W	L	L	W	L	W	W	D	W	W	L	L	W	L	D	D	D	L	D	L	L	W	W	L	L	L	L	L	L	W
Navy	W	D	D	L	D	L	W	L	L	L	D	L	L	L	L	L	L	W	W	W	L	L	D	D	L	D	W	L	L	D	D	L	W	L
Ubon UMT United	L	W	L	W	L	L	L	L	L	L	D	D	L	L	D	L	D	L	D	W	L	D	L	W	L	L	W	L	L	D	L	L	D	W
Air Force Central	L	L	L	L	L	D	L	L	W	L	D	L	L	L	L	L	L	L	L	L	L	L	W	D	W	D	L	L	L	W	L	L	L	L

Source: Thai League
W = Win; D = Draw; L = Lose

== Results ==
Home \ Away	AFC	BKG	BKU	BRU	CHIH	CRU	CHO	NAKR	RTN	PATU	POT	POR	PCH	RAT	MTU	SUKH	SUP	UUMT
Air Force Central		2–5	0–1	2–4	2–2	0–2	1–2	1–0	1–5	2–3	1–2	3–2	1–3	0–1	0–1	1–2	1–3	0–2
Bangkok Glass	2–0		0–1	1–2	2–5	0–0	7–4	1–2	0–1	0–1	4–1	2–0	3–4	2–1	3–1	5–1	1–0	1–1
Bangkok United	6–2	3–2		2–2	1–0	0–1	2–1	2–0	5–2	1–2	2–1	2–1	0–0	1–1	2–3	2–3	2–2	1–0
Buriram United	5–0	1–0	2–1		0–1	1–0	2–1	2–1	2–0	3–0	2–0	3–1	3–0	2–1	4–0	4–1	2–1	2–1
Chainat Hornbill	2–0	1–1	0–0	0–2		0–1	0–0	1–2	1–0	1–2	2–4	2–1	3–1	2–1	2–1	4–2	0–0	4–5
Chiangrai United	1–1	1–1	1–2	1–0	1–2		1–0	1–2	2–2	1–0	1–1	2–0	3–2	2–0	0–3	4–0	2–1	4–1
Chonburi	2–1	0–2	2–4	0–2	2–0	1–1		3–1	1–1	1–2	3–1	0–1	4–2	2–1	1–1	1–2	2–0	2–2
Nakhon Ratchasima	0–1	1–0	0–0	0–2	1–0	1–1	0–1		2–1	2–0	0–0	0–4	3–3	2–1	0–1	2–1	2–2	3–1
Navy	1–1	0–0	0–4	0–4	2–2	3–6	3–1	1–3		4–1	4–2	0–5	1–1	2–2	0–2	3–2	0–0	1–0
Pattaya United	2–0	1–1	3–4	2–4	4–1	0–0	1–0	0–1	1–0		3–1	1–4	0–0	2–2	0–4	3–0	1–1	3–3
Police Tero	2–3	0–3	1–2	1–2	1–1	1–1	0–1	0–1	6–3	3–1		4–2	2–1	1–2	2–4	2–1	1–1	3–2
Port	3–1	3–2	0–3	2–2	1–1	2–1	5–0	4–0	7–1	3–0	1–0		1–0	3–2	2–3	2–2	0–2	1–0
PT Prachuap	1–1	1–0	1–1	1–2	2–0	4–2	0–0	2–1	5–0	2–0	3–2	2–1		2–1	6–1	1–0	0–1	2–1
Ratchaburi Mitr Phol	1–0	2–1	1–2	0–1	2–1	0–4	1–1	3–0	4–0	2–1	3–2	1–4	2–1		1–2	0–0	1–2	2–0
SCG Muangthong United	3–1	2–2	0–0	0–3	2–0	1–1	4–1	0–0	4–0	5–5	2–2	0–2	1–2	2–2		4–3	2–2	2–1
Sukhothai	3–2	1–1	1–4	1–0	4–2	2–0	1–2	1–1	2–2	4–0	1–2	2–2	2–0	3–2	2–3		1–1	1–0
Suphanburi	3–0	2–0	1–2	1–1	1–2	2–0	0–1	1–0	3–1	1–2	2–0	1–2	0–0	2–2	1–1	0–1		2–2
Ubon UMT United	1–0	0–0	0–3	2–3	1–1	0–3	1–2	2–2	3–0	1–3	1–2	0–1	3–1	1–2	0–0	1–0	0–1	

Updated to match(es) played on 7 October 2018. Source: Thai League
Legend: Blue = home team win; Yellow = draw; Red = away team win.

== Season statistics ==
=== Top scorers ===
As of 7 October 2018.

Rank	Player	Club	Goals
1	(Brazil) Diogo	Buriram United	34
2	(Brazil) Jonatan Ferreira Reis	PT Prachuap	26
2	(Brazil) Heberty	SCG Muangthong United	26
4	(El Salvador) Nelson Bonilla	Sukhothai	25
5	(Montenegro) Dragan Bošković	Port	21
6	(Brazil) Lukian	Pattaya United	18
7	(France) Michaël N'dri	Police Tero	16
7	(Guinea) Lonsana Doumbouya	PT Prachuap	16
9	(Ivory Coast) Bernard Doumbia	Chainat Hornbill	15
9	(Brazil) Bill	Ratchaburi Mitr Phol (6), Chiangrai United (9)	15
9	(Brazil) Marcos Vinícius	Police Tero	15
9	(Spain) Sergio Suárez	Port	15

=== Top assists ===
As of 7 October 2018.

Rank	Player	Club	Assists
1	(Madagascar) John Baggio	Sukhothai	14
1	(Brazil) Vander Luíz	Bangkok United	14
3	(Thailand) Pakorn Prempak	Port	12
3	(Brazil) Heberty	SCG Muangthong United	12
5	(Spain) Sergio Suárez	Port	10
6	(Brazil) Diogo	Buriram United	9
6	(Brazil) Vitor Júnior	Navy	9
8	(Brazil) Osvaldo	Buriram United	8
8	(Myanmar) Aung Thu	Police Tero	8
10	(Thailand) Sumanya Purisai	Bangkok United	7
10	(Ivory Coast) Bireme Diouf	Chainat Hornbill	7
10	(Brazil) William Henrique	Chiangrai United	7
10	(Thailand) Tristan Do	SCG Muangthong United	7

=== Hat-tricks ===
Player	For	Against	Result	Date
(Thailand) Chenrop Samphaodi	SCG Muangthong United	Bangkok United	3–2	10 February 2018
(Brazil) Lukian	Pattaya United	Chainat Hornbill	4–1	17 February 2018
(Brazil) Jonatan Ferreira Reis	PT Prachuap	Bangkok Glass	4–3	17 March 2018
(Brazil) Diogo	Buriram United	Ubon UMT United	3–2	28 March 2018
(South Korea) Kang Soo-il	Ratchaburi Mitr Phol	Navy	4–0	1 April 2018
(Brazil) Paulo Rangel	Nakhon Ratchasima Mazda	Navy	3–1	28 April 2018
(Brazil) Jonatan Ferreira Reis	PT Prachuap	Navy	5–0	5 May 2018
(Brazil) Edgar	Buriram United	Pattaya United	4–2	20 May 2018
(Brazil) Heberty	SCG Muangthong United	Sukhothai	4–3	20 May 2018
(France) Michaël N'dri	Police Tero	Navy	6–3	26 May 2018
(El Salvador) Nelson Bonilla	Sukhothai	Ratchaburi Mitr Phol	3–2	26 May 2018
(Costa Rica) Ariel Rodríguez	Bangkok Glass	Chonburi	7–4	1 July 2018
(Brazil) Diogo	Buriram United	Navy	4–0	7 July 2018
(El Salvador) Nelson Bonilla	Sukhothai	Bangkok United	3–2	23 September 2018
(Brazil) Diogo	Buriram United	Air Force Central	4–2	3 October 2018
(Brazil) Heberty	SCG Muangthong United	Pattaya United	5–5	3 October 2018
(Montenegro) Dragan Bošković^{4}	Port	Pattaya United	4–1	7 October 2018

=== Clean sheets ===
As of 7 October 2018.

Rank	Player	Club	Clean sheets
1	Siwarak Tedsungnoen	Buriram United	13
2	Michael Falkesgaard	Bangkok United	11
2	Chatchai Budprom	Chiangrai United	11
2	Sinthaweechai Hathairattanakool	Suphanburi	11
5	Samuel Cunningham	Nakhon Ratchasima	8
5	Kwanchai Suklom	PT Prachuap	8
7	Prasit Padungchok	SCG Muangthong United	7
8	Narit Taweekul	Bangkok Glass	6
8	Teerath Nakchamnarn	Chainat Hornbill	6
8	Chanin Sae-ear	Chonburi	6
8	Patiwat Khammai	Pattaya United	6

== Awards ==
=== Monthly awards ===
Month	Coach of the Month		Player of the Month		Goal of the month		Reference
Month	Coach	Club	Player	Club	Player	Club	Reference
February	Jadet Meelarp	Port	Nelson Bonilla	Sukhothai	Nurul Sriyankem	Port	
March	Božidar Bandović	Buriram United	Diogo	Buriram United	Pakorn Prempak	Port	
April	Alexandré Pölking	Bangkok United	Sumanya Purisai	Bangkok United	Aung Thu	Police Tero	
May	Thawatchai Damrong-Ongtrakul	PT Prachuap	Sergio Suárez	Port	Heberty	SCG Muangthong United	
June	Dennis Amato	Chainat Hornbill	Heberty	SCG Muangthong United	Diogo	Buriram United	
July	Surapong Kongthep	Pattaya United	Siwarak Tedsungnoen	Buriram United	Pokklaw Anan	Bangkok United	
August					Pakorn Prempak	Port	
September	Božidar Bandović	Buriram United	Sinthaweechai Hathairattanakool	Suphanburi	Cleiton Silva	Suphanburi	

== Attendance ==
=== Overall statistics ===
Pos	Team	Total	High	Low	Average	Change
1	Buriram United	221,003	35,573	6,294	13,000	−6.4%
2	SCG Muangthong United	134,506	12,721	5,315	7,912	−10.2%
3	Nakhon Ratchasima Mazda	124,460	17,319	1,465	7,321	+30.4%
4	Suphanburi	90,601	13,156	1,559	5,329	−29.9%
5	Bangkok Glass	82,280	8,896	3,247	4,840	−8.7%
6	Sukhothai	78,302	7,803	2,423	4,606	+7.3%
7	Chonburi	73,193	7,801	2,871	4,305	+22.1%
8	Port	67,790	6,629	2,040	3,987	−5.3%
9	PT Prachuap	65,281	4,979	2,831	3,840	+165.0%^{†}
10	Ratchaburi Mitr Phol	60,664	7,747	1,979	3,568	−3.1%
11	Chiangrai United	59,606	10,054	1,238	3,506	−46.4%
12	Chainat Hornbill	52,031	5,656	2,219	3,060	+122.7%^{†}
13	Bangkok United	49,455	8,205	1,410	2,909	+1.9%
14	Pattaya United	45,111	5,500	1,616	2,654	−24.6%
15	Navy	42,795	4,903	884	2,517	−0.1%
16	Police Tero	41,972	4,540	1,467	2,469	+36.0%
17	Ubon UMT United	41,282	5,272	1,225	2,428	−24.5%
18	Air Force Central	36,165	6,756	1,009	2,127	−41.5%^{†}
	League total	1,366,497	35,573	884	4,466	−3.0%

Updated to games played on 7 October 2018
Source: Thai League
Notes:
^{†} Teams played previous season in Thai League 2

=== Attendance by home match played ===
Team \ Match played	1	2	3	4	5	6	7	8	9	10	11	12	13	14	15	16	17	Total
Air Force Central	4,154	6,756	2,526	1,769	1,533	1,515	1,589	1,659	1,451	1,679	1,443	2,135	1,898	1,215	1,009	1,345	2,489	36,165
Bangkok Glass	8,896	5,069	3,899	3,328	4,728	3,656	4,013	4,303	8,379	3,247	3,441	6,322	5,437	5,051	4,179	3,279	5,053	82,280
Bangkok United	8,205	1,809	7,447	2,083	1,410	1,969	3,534	2,063	2,668	2,528	1,976	2,078	3,364	2,130	1,620	2,302	2,269	49,455
Buriram United	10,144	11,085	6,294	9,479	10,890	11,845	8,818	30,011	8,836	7,289	14,154	8,446	20,712	10,533	6,873	10,021	35,573	221,003
Chainat Hornbill	3,500	4,171	2,360	2,517	2,240	2,410	3,099	2,811	2,558	2,669	2,399	3,117	3,936	2,219	2,528	5,656	3,841	52,031
Chiangrai United	6,158	4,409	3,360	3,652	2,075	10,054	3,282	3,009	2,844	10,053	1,589	1,463	1,333	1,941	1,238	1,284	1,862	59,606
Chonburi	2,871	3,785	3,284	3,069	3,692	6,599	4,991	4,162	5,601	3,808	3,480	7,801	3,828	4,151	4,012	3,769	4,290	73,193
Nakhon Ratchasima Mazda	10,878	9,887	15,664	17,319	10,442	8,817	7,574	4,219	4,652	2,630	2,559	3,270	4,677	15,679	1,465	2,372	2,356	124,460
Navy	3,088	3,359	2,778	2,476	1,864	2,469	2,838	2,556	2,532	4,903	2,741	3,685	2,116	1,886	1,648	884	972	42,795
Pattaya United	2,702	3,151	1,616	3,267	2,603	2,889	1,905	2,223	5,500	3,718	1,952	1,789	3,694	2,328	1,754	1,702	2,318	45,111
Police Tero	3,331	1,843	3,723	3,522	1,861	3,278	1,814	4,540	1,543	2,243	1,467	1,536	1,977	4,532	1,577	1,683	1,502	41,972
Port	6,517	5,069	5,439	3,570	4,258	3,985	2,333	3,439	6,629	2,894	3,759	3,441	6,131	2,772	2,040	2,849	2,665	67,790
PT Prachuap	3,820	3,280	4,909	4,109	4,219	4,039	3,977	4,158	3,772	4,979	4,325	3,198	3,568	3,759	3,127	2,831	3,211	65,281
Ratchaburi Mitr Phol	3,180	3,452	3,059	2,285	3,497	3,284	2,348	3,828	4,374	2,970	3,570	3,170	2,355	4,252	1,979	5,314	7,747	60,664
SCG Muangthong United	9,273	10,295	8,901	8,614	6,174	5,315	5,807	7,798	6,979	7,592	6,699	8,212	6,881	6,752	12,721	7,626	8,867	134,506
Sukhothai	5,333	4,964	6,390	4,070	4,632	3,108	6,094	4,051	2,591	2,572	2,423	2,770	3,856	4,570	6,475	7,803	6,600	78,302
Suphanburi	7,248	7,165	4,042	3,114	13,156	7,180	1,559	2,709	2,687	3,096	3,147	4,643	8,419	4,860	3,534	5,676	8,366	90,601
Ubon UMT United	2,152	2,075	5,135	2,108	1,513	2,817	2,145	2,570	2,218	2,170	2,853	5,272	1,225	2,317	1,265	1,615	1,832	41,282

Source: Thai League

== See also ==
- 2018 Thai League 2
- 2018 Thai League 3
- 2018 Thai League 4
- 2018 Thailand Amateur League
- 2018 Thai FA Cup
- 2018 Thai League Cup
- 2018 Thailand Champions Cup
- Thai League All-Star Football
- List of foreign Thai League 1 players
