= Korrakot Wiriyaudomsiri =

Thai footballer (born 1988)

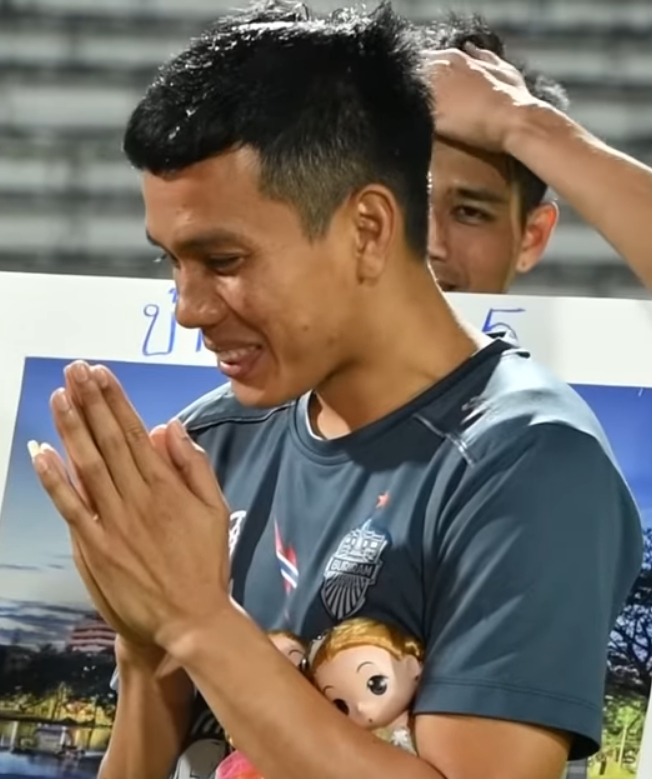

Personal information
- Full name: Korrakot Wiriyaudomsiri
- Date of birth: 19 January 1988 (age 38)
- Place of birth: Buriram, Thailand
- Height: 1.80 m (5 ft 11 in)
- Position: Left-back

Youth career
- 2000–2002: Bansrisook School
- 2003–2005: Wat Suthiwararam School
- 2006–2009: Kasem Bundit University

Senior career*
Years	Team	Apps	(Gls)
2010	TTM FC	15	(0)
2011	Songkhla United	27	(2)
2012–2013	BEC Tero Sasana	19	(0)
2012	→ Songkhla United (loan)	6	(0)
2013	→ Bangkok Glass (loan)	25	(1)
2014–2016	Chonburi	74	(3)
2016–2021	Buriram United	81	(6)
2021–2022	Chiangmai United	24	(0)
Total		271	(12)

International career^{‡}
2013–2019	Thailand	13	(1)
- * Club domestic league appearances and goals as of 4 May 2022 ‡ National team caps and goals as of 6 January 2019

Korrakot Wiriyaudomsiri (Thai: กรกช วิริยอุดมศิริ, born January 19, 1988), simply known as Ming (Thai: มิ้ง), is a Thai retired professional footballer who plays as a left-back. Korrakot is a free kick specialist.

== International career ==
In October 10, he debuted for Thailand in a friendly match against Bahrain. In October 15, he played his second match against Iran. In 2018 he was called up by Thailand national team for the 2018 AFF Suzuki Cup. In that same tournament, he scored a spectacular goal from a corner kick, which would also turn out to be his only international goal.

=== International ===
As of 25 November 2018

National team	Year	Apps	Goals
Thailand	2013	2	0
Thailand	2014	1	0
Thailand	2018	5	1
Thailand	Total	8	1

=== International goals ===
Scores and results list Thailand's goal tally first.

No.	Date	Venue	Opponent	Score	Result	Competition
1.	17 November 2018	Rajamangala Stadium, Bangkok, Thailand	Indonesia	1–1	4–2	2018 AFF Championship

== Honours ==
=== Club ===
Buriram United

- Thai League 1 (2): 2017, 2018
- Thailand Champions Cup (1): 2019
