= Osvaldo (footballer, born 1987) =

Brazilian footballer

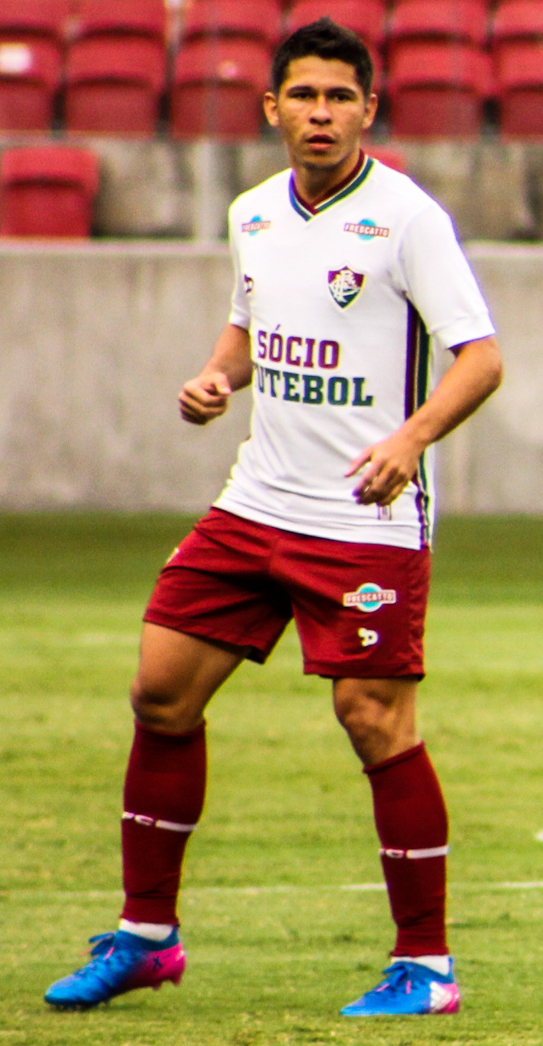

Personal information
- Full name: Osvaldo Lourenço Filho
- Date of birth: 11 April 1987 (age 39)
- Place of birth: Fortaleza, Brazil
- Height: 1.70 m (5 ft 7 in)
- Position: Forward

Team information
- Current team: Vitória
- Number: 11

Youth career
- Estação
- 2005: Internacional
- 2005–2006: Fortaleza

Senior career*
Years	Team	Apps	(Gls)
2006–2009	Fortaleza	53	(14)
2007	→ Ríver (loan)	16	(6)
2009–2011	Shabab Al-Ahli	21	(9)
2009–2010	→ Braga (loan)	4	(0)
2011	→ Ceará (loan)	50	(8)
2012–2014	São Paulo	120	(13)
2015	Al-Ahli	10	(1)
2015–2017	Fluminense	50	(4)
2017	Sport Recife	28	(3)
2018	Fortaleza	14	(2)
2018–2019	Buriram United	16	(2)
2019–2021	Fortaleza	83	(12)
2022	CSA	35	(3)
2023–	Vitória	115	(13)

International career
2013	Brazil	2	(0)
- * Club domestic league appearances and goals as of 8 April 2026

Osvaldo Lourenço Filho (born 11 April 1987), simply known as Osvaldo, is a Brazilian footballer as a forward for Vitória. He is known for his explosive pace, dribbling ability and speed.

== Career ==
On 24 January 2012, after a good year playing for Ceará, Osvaldo signed a contract with São Paulo FC, whom paid R$4.6 million to emirati side Al-Ahli Dubai for 50% of his rights.

After a bad phase, who occurred for all second semester of 2013, Osvaldo almost was exchanged with Fluminense FC to Wágner without agreement of him. But, in beginning of 2014, Osvaldo has played as before, and, after being the star of team in some important games - as in the first game of 2014 Copa do Brasil, in the victory by 1-0 against CSA, with his goal, the club has refused some good proposes, as one of Kashima Antlers.

On 18 January 2015 Osvaldo was signed by Al-Ahli Jeddah on a three-year contract.

== International career ==
On 13 March 2013, after a Lucas's contusion in a game for his club, Paris Saint-Germain, Luiz Felipe Scolari called up Osvaldo to substitute his former colleague of club for friendlies against Italy and Russia on 21 and 25 March respectively.

He made his début for Brazil on 6 April 2013 in the victory by 4–0 against Bolivia, as substitute for Neymar.

== Career statistics ==
As of match played 1 September 2024.

Appearances and goals by club, season and competition
Club	Season	League			State League		Cup		League Cup		Continental		Other		Total	
Club	Season	Division	Apps	Goals	Apps	Goals	Apps	Goals	Apps	Goals	Apps	Goals	Apps	Goals	Apps	Goals
Fortaleza	2006	Série A	3	0	0	0	0	0	—		—		—		3	0
Fortaleza	2007	Série B	7	1	—		0	0	—		—		—		7	1
Fortaleza	2008	Série B	26	10	13	2	3	0	—		—		—		42	12
Fortaleza	2009	Série B	0	0	2	1	0	0	—		—		—		2	1
Fortaleza	Total		38	11	15	3	3	0	—		—		—		54	14
Ríver (loan)	2007	Série C	0	0	16	6	—		—		—		—		16	6
Shabab Al-Ahli	2008–09	UAE Pro League	21	9	—		0	0	0	0	—		—		21	9
Braga (loan)	2009–10	Primeira Liga	4	0	—		0	0	2 (Note: Appearance(s) in Taça da Liga)	0	—		—		6	0
Ceará (loan)	2011	Série A	36	5	14	3	7	0	—		2 (Note: Appearance(s) in Copa Sudamericana)	0	—		59	8
São Paulo	2012	Série A	24	8	12	1	3	1	—		8	1	—		47	11
São Paulo	2013	Série A	26	0	11	2	—		—		11 (Note: Nine appearances and three goals in Copa Libertadores, two appearances in Copa Sudamericana)	3	2 (Note: Appearance(s) in Recopa Sudamericana)	0	50	5
São Paulo	2014	Série A	32	0	15	2	5	2	—		7	0	—		59	4
São Paulo	Total		82	8	38	5	8	3	—		26	4	2	0	156	20
Al-Ahli	2014–15	Saudi Pro League	10	1	—		1	0	—		8 (Note: Appearance(s) in AFC Champions League)	1	2 (Note: Appearance(s) in Saudi Crown Prince Cup)	0	21	2
Fluminense	2015	Série A	20	1	—		3	0	—		—		—		23	1
Fluminense	2016	Série A	11	0	14	2	3	0	—		—		3 (Note: Appearance(s) in Primeira Liga (Brazil))	2	31	4
Fluminense	2017	Série A	0	0	5	1	0	0	—		0	0	1	0	6	1
Fluminense	Total		31	1	19	3	6	0	—		0	0	4	2	60	6
Sport Recife	2017	Série A	28	3	—		—		—		—		—		28	3
Fortaleza	2018	Série B	5	1	9	1	—		—		—		—		16	2
Buriram United	2018	Thai League 1	16	2	—		5	1	4 (Note: Appearance(s) in Thai League Cup)	0	—		—		25	3
Buriram United	2019	Thai League 1	—		—		—		—		—		0	0	0	0
Buriram United	Total		16	2	—		5	1	4	0	—		0	0	25	3
Fortaleza	2019	Série A	32	7	6	2	1	0	—		—		7 (Note: Appearance(s) in Copa do Nordeste)	0	46	9
Fortaleza	2020	Série A	36	1	5	2	1	0	—		2	0	10	1	54	4
Fortaleza	2021	Série A	12	0	7	0	3	0	—		—		7	1	29	1
Fortaleza	Total		80	8	18	4	5	0	—		2	0	24	2	129	14
CSA	2022	Série B	33	2	5	1	4	0	—		—		5	0	47	3
Vitória	2023	Série B	31	5	9	0	1	0	—		—		9	3	50	8
Vitória	2024	Série A	19	2	12	5	2	0	—		—		6	1	39	8
Vitória	Total		50	7	21	5	3	0	—		—		15	4	89	16
Career total			434	58	155	31	42	4	6	0	38	5	52	8	727	106

== Honours ==
Ríver

- Campeonato Piauiense: 2007

Fortaleza

- Campeonato Cearense: 2008, 2019, 2020, 2021
- Copa do Nordeste: 2019

Shabab Al-Ahli

- UAE Pro League: 2008–09

Ceará

- Campeonato Cearense: 2011

São Paulo

- Copa Sudamericana: 2012

Al Ahli

- Saudi Crown Prince Cup : 2014–15

Fluminense

- Primeira Liga : 2016

Buriram United

- Thai League 1: 2018
- Thailand Champions Cup: 2019

Vitória

- Campeonato Brasileiro Série B: 2023
