= Anuwat Noicheunphan =

Thai footballer

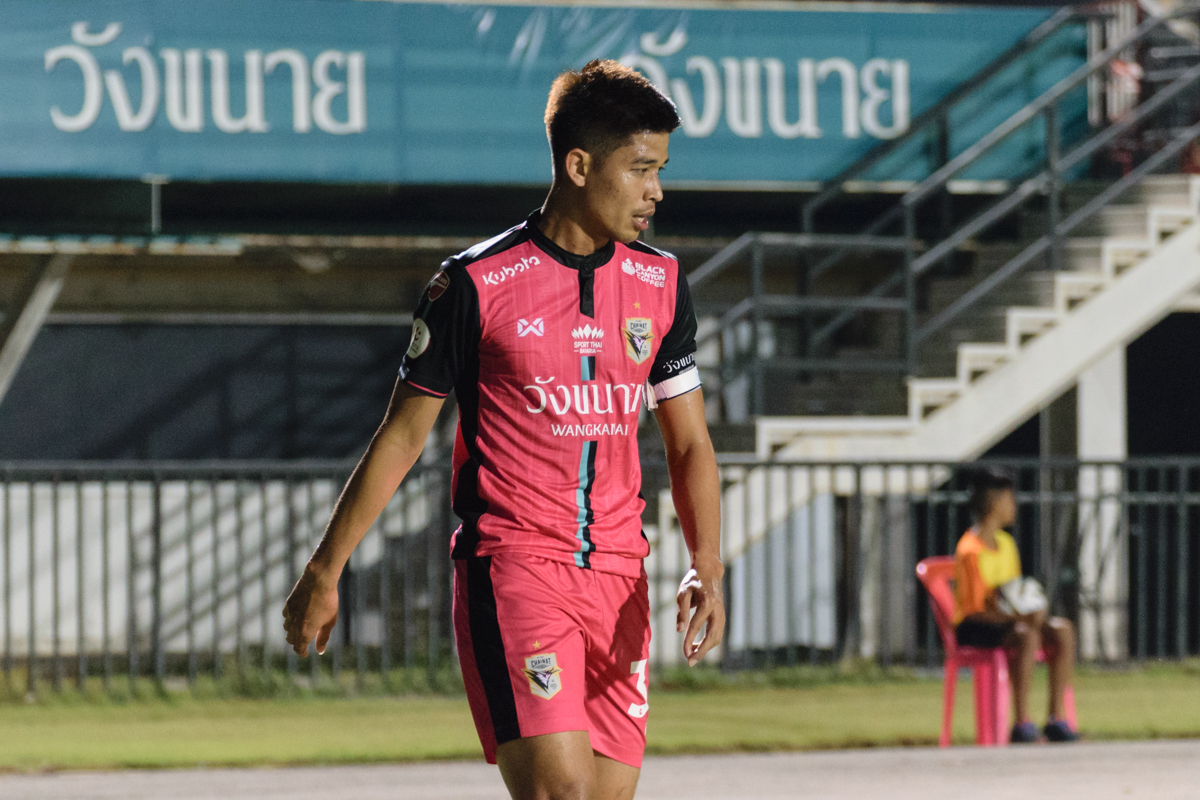

Personal information
- Full name: Anuwat Noicheunphan
- Date of birth: 21 September 1988 (age 38)
- Place of birth: Suphan Buri, Thailand
- Height: 1.80 m (5 ft 11 in)
- Position: Defensive midfielder

Youth career
- 2006–2008: Army United

Senior career*
Years	Team	Apps	(Gls)
2009–2018	Army United	109	(10)
2012	→ PTT Rayong (loan)	19	(3)
2016–2018	→ Chainat Hornbill (loan)	37	(5)
2018–2020	Buriram United	5	(0)
2019	→ Army United (loan)	28	(3)
2020–2022	Chainat Hornbill	54	(11)
2023	Kasetsart	6	(0)
2024	Police Tero	7	(0)
2024–	Ayutthaya United	17	(0)

International career
2015	Thailand	4	(0)
- * Club domestic league appearances and goals

Anuwat Noicheunphan (Thai: อนุวัติ น้อยชื่นพันธ์, born September 21, 1988) is a Thai professional footballer who plays as a defensive midfielder.

== International career ==
In March, 2015 Anuwat debuted for Thailand in a friendly match against Singapore.

=== International ===
As of 12 November 2015

National team	Year	Apps	Goals
Thailand	2015	4	0
Thailand	Total	4	0

== Honours ==
=== Club ===
Buriram United

- Thai League 1 (1): 2018
- Thailand Champions Cup (1): 2019
