= Nopparat Sakun-ood =

Thai footballer (born 1986)

Personal information
- Full name: Nopparat Sakun-ood
- Date of birth: 12 March 1986 (age 40)
- Place of birth: Phrae, Thailand
- Height: 1.75 m (5 ft 9 in)
- Position: Centre-back

Senior career*
Years	Team	Apps	(Gls)
2003–2006	Crown Property Bureau		
2007–2008	Thai Honda		
2009–2012	PTT Rayong		
2013–2014	Phrae United		
2015–2017	Thai Honda	31	(2)
2017–2019	Pattaya United	36	(0)
2019	→ Air Force Central (loan)	11	(0)
2020	Khon Kaen	2	(0)
2020	Nongbua Pitchaya	2	(0)
2020–2021	Udon United	11	(0)
2021–2022	Songkhla	16	(0)
2022	Banbueng	9	(0)
2023	Mahasarakham SBT	17	(2)
- * Club domestic league appearances and goals as of 6 May 2023

Nopparat Sakun-ood (Thai: นพรัตน์ สกุลอ๊อด, born March 12, 1986), is a Thai professional footballer who plays as a centre-back.

== Honour ==
Nongbua Pitchaya

- Thai League 2 Champions : 2020–21

Mahasarakham SBT

- Thai League 3 Northeastern Region Champions : 2022–23
