= Edgar (footballer, born 1987) =

Brazilian footballer

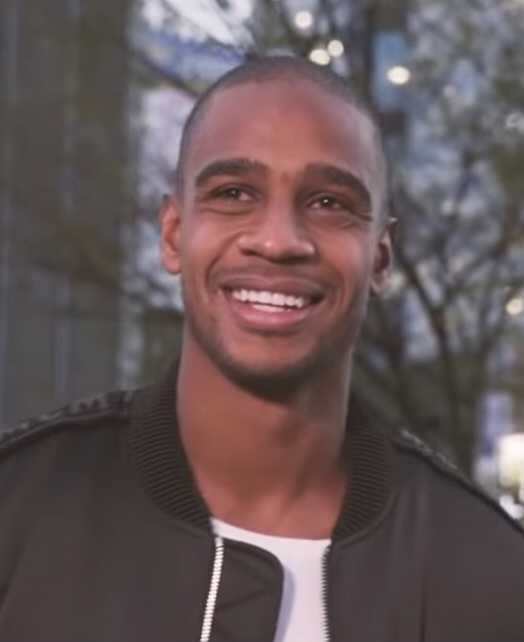
- Edgar in 2019

Personal information
- Full name: Edgar Bruno da Silva
- Date of birth: 3 January 1987 (age 39)
- Place of birth: São Carlos, Brazil
- Height: 1.91 m (6 ft 3 in)
- Position: Forward

Team information
- Current team: Daegu FC
- Number: 9

Youth career
- 2004–2005: Paulistinha

Senior career*
Years	Team	Apps	(Gls)
2005–2006	Joinville	11	(4)
2006	→ São Paulo (loan)	3	(0)
2007	Beira-Mar	13	(4)
2007–2008	Porto	2	(0)
2008	→ Académica (loan)	11	(3)
2008	→ Red Star Belgrade (loan)	8	(1)
2009–2010	Vasco da Gama	5	(2)
2009–2010	→ Nacional (loan)	24	(12)
2010–2012	Vitória Guimarães	58	(21)
2012–2015	Al Shabab	70	(37)
2015–2016	Al-Wasl	13	(7)
2016–2017	Adanaspor	13	(0)
2017	Lekhwiya	3	(2)
2018	Buriram United	15	(8)
2018	→ Daegu FC (loan)	18	(8)
2019–	Daegu FC	185	(55)

International career
2006–2007	Brazil U20		
- * Club domestic league appearances and goals as of 5 June 2026

Edgar Bruno da Silva (born 3 January 1987), known simply as Edgar, is a Brazilian professional footballer who plays as a forward for South Korean club Daegu FC.

== Club career ==
Born in São Carlos, São Paulo, Edgar started professionally for São Paulo FC in 2006, being loaned by Série C side Joinville Esporte Clube. In January 2007 he moved to Portugal with S.C. Beira-Mar, scoring four league goals which proved insufficient in avoiding relegation from the Primeira Liga; also in that year, he was part of the Brazilian under-20 team that won the South American Youth Football Championship.

In the 2007 summer transfer window, Edgar was transferred to FC Porto but, after featuring sparingly, moved on loan to fellow league club Associação Académica de Coimbra. He joined Red Star Belgrade in Serbia in July 2008 on a season-long loan, but, in January of the following year, he was released by Porto and returned to Brazil, signing for CR Vasco da Gama.

In August 2009, Edgar returned to Portugal after agreeing to join C.D. Nacional, which had just lost Nenê – 2008–09's league top scorer – to Cagliari Calcio. He started off well, netting seven times in as many games, including twice in a 2–1 derby win against C.S. Marítimo and a hat-trick at Leixões SC (4–2).

Edgar enjoyed another productive season in 2010–11, scoring ten goals in the league with Vitória de Guimarães to help the Minho team qualify to the UEFA Europa League. He also netted five in seven appearances in the campaign's Portuguese Cup, including one in the final against Porto, albeit in a 2–6 loss – he also missed a penalty kick with the score levelled at 2–2.

In July 2012, Edgar moved to UAE Pro-League side Al Shabab (Dubai) on a one-year contract. On 16 August 2016, he left Al-Wasl F.C. also in the UAE Arabian Gulf League and signed a two-year deal with Turkish club Adanaspor, being released the following January.

In 2022, during the 2022 AFC Champions League qualifying play-offs against Buriram United, Edgar got an achilles tendon injury and had to miss rest of the season. Eventually, he had to leave the club through a mutual consent.

== Career statistics ==
=== Club ===
As of match played 5 June 2026

Appearances and goals by club, season and competition
Club	Season	League			State League		National cup		League cup		Continental		Other		Total	
Club	Season	Division	Apps	Goals	Apps	Goals	Apps	Goals	Apps	Goals	Apps	Goals	Apps	Goals	Apps	Goals
São Paulo (loan)	2006	Série A	3	0	—		0	0	—		—		—		3	0
Beira-Mar	2006–07	Primeira Liga	13	4	—		3	2	0	0	—		—		16	6
Porto	2007–08	Primeira Liga	2	0	—		0	0	1	0	0	0	—		3	0
Académica (loan)	2007–08	Primeira Liga	11	3	—		—		—		—		—		11	3
Red Star Belgrade (loan)	2008–09	Serbian Superliga	8	1	—		0	0	—		2	1	—		10	2
Vasco da Gama	2009	Série B	5	2	1	0	0	0	—		—		—		7	2
Nacional (loan)	2009–10	Primeira Liga	24	10	—		0	0	7	6	5	1	—		36	17
Vitória Guimarães	2010–11	Primeira Liga	30	10	—		0	0	7	6	—		—		37	16
Vitória Guimarães	2011–12	Primeira Liga	28	11	—		3	1	3	6	3	0	—		37	18
Vitória Guimarães	Total		58	21	—		3	1	10	6	3	0	—		74	34
Al Shabab	2012–13	UAE Pro League	23	14	—		0	0	7	6	8	4	—		38	24
Al Shabab	2013–14	UAE Pro League	22	15	—		2	2	5	2	—		—		29	19
Al Shabab	2014–15	UAE Pro League	25	8	—		3	1	7	6	—		—		30	15
Al Shabab	Total		70	37	—		5	3	19	14	8	4	—		97	58
Al-Wasl	2015–16	UAE Pro League	13	7	—		—		7	4	—		—		20	11
Adanaspor	2016–17	Süper Lig	13	0	—		1	1	—		—		—		14	1
Lekhwiya	2016–17	Qatar Stars League	3	2	—		0	0	0	0	0	0	—		3	2
Buriram United	2018	Thai League 1	15	8	—		0	0	0	0	8	4	1	0	24	12
Daegu FC (loan)	2018	K League 1	18	8	—		4	3	—		—		—		22	11
Daegu FC	2019	K League 1	24	11	—		1	0	—		6	4	—		31	15
Daegu FC	2020	K League 1	16	5	—		0	0	—		—		—		16	5
Daegu FC	2021	K League 1	32	10	—		5	2	—		7	6	—		44	18
Daegu FC	2022	K League 1	5	1	—		0	0	—		1	0	—		6	1
Daegu FC	2023	K League 1	34	9	—		2	0	—		—		—		36	9
Daegu FC	2024	K League 1	30	5	—		0	0	—		—		2	1	32	6
Daegu FC	2025	K League 1	31	6	—		1	0	—		—		—		32	6
Daegu FC	2026	K League 2	13	8	—		0	0	—		—		—		13	8
Daegu FC	Daegu total		203	63	—		13	5	—		14	10	2	1	232	79
Career total			459	166	1	0	25	12	44	36	43	20	3	1	575	235

== Honours ==
São Paulo

- Campeonato Brasileiro Série A: 2006

Porto

- Primeira Liga: 2007–08

Vasco

- Campeonato Brasileiro Série B: 2009

Al Shabab

- GCC Champions League: 2015

Lekhwiya

- Qatar Stars League: 2016–17

Daegu

- Korean FA Cup: 2018

Brazil U20

- South American Youth Football Championship: 2007
