= Dennis Amato =

German footballer

Personal information
- Full name: Dennis Amato
- Date of birth: 26 June 1980 (age 46)
- Place of birth: Germany
- Height: 1.82 m (5 ft 11 1/2 in)
- Position: Centre back

Team information
- Current team: Lamphun Warriors (head coach)

Senior career*
Years	Team	Apps	(Gls)
1989–2000	VfR Mannheim	3	(0)
2000–2001	Mainz 05 II	26	(2)

Managerial career
- 2012–2014: Pfungstadt
- 2015–2016: Wormatia Worms
- 2016–2017: Chainat Hornbill
- 2018–2019: Chainat Hornbill
- 2020–2021: Chiangmai United
- 2021–2023: Sukhothai
- 2024–2025: Pattaya United
- 2025–: Lamphun Warriors
- * Club domestic league appearances and goals

Dennis Amato (born 26 June 1980) is a German professional football manager and former player who is the manager of Thai League 1 club Lamphun Warriors.

== Managerial career ==
In 2016, he was appointed manager of Chainat Hornbill.

== Managerial statistics ==
As of match played 22 November 2026

Managerial record by team and tenure
Team	From	To	Record					Ref.
Team	From	To	P	W	D	L	Win %	Ref.
Chainat Hornbill	7 April 2017	11 November 2017	1	0	1	0	0.0	
Chainat Hornbill	18 February 2018	30 November 2019	68	21	14	33	30.9	
Chiangmai United	12 November 2020	23 April 2021	22	13	5	4	59.1	
Sukhothai	24 April 2021	15 March 2023	60	28	16	16	46.7	
Pattaya United	19 September 2024	2 March 2025	21	7	5	9	33.3	
Lamphun Warriors	15 December 2025	Present	31	11	11	9	35.5	
Career total			203	80	52	71	39.4	

== Honours ==
=== Manager ===
Chainat Hornbill

- Thai League 2: 2017

Chiangmai United

- Thai League 2 runner-up: 2020–21

Sukhothai

- Thai League 2 runner-up: 2021–22
