= Ekkaluck Thongkit =

Thai footballer (born 1983)

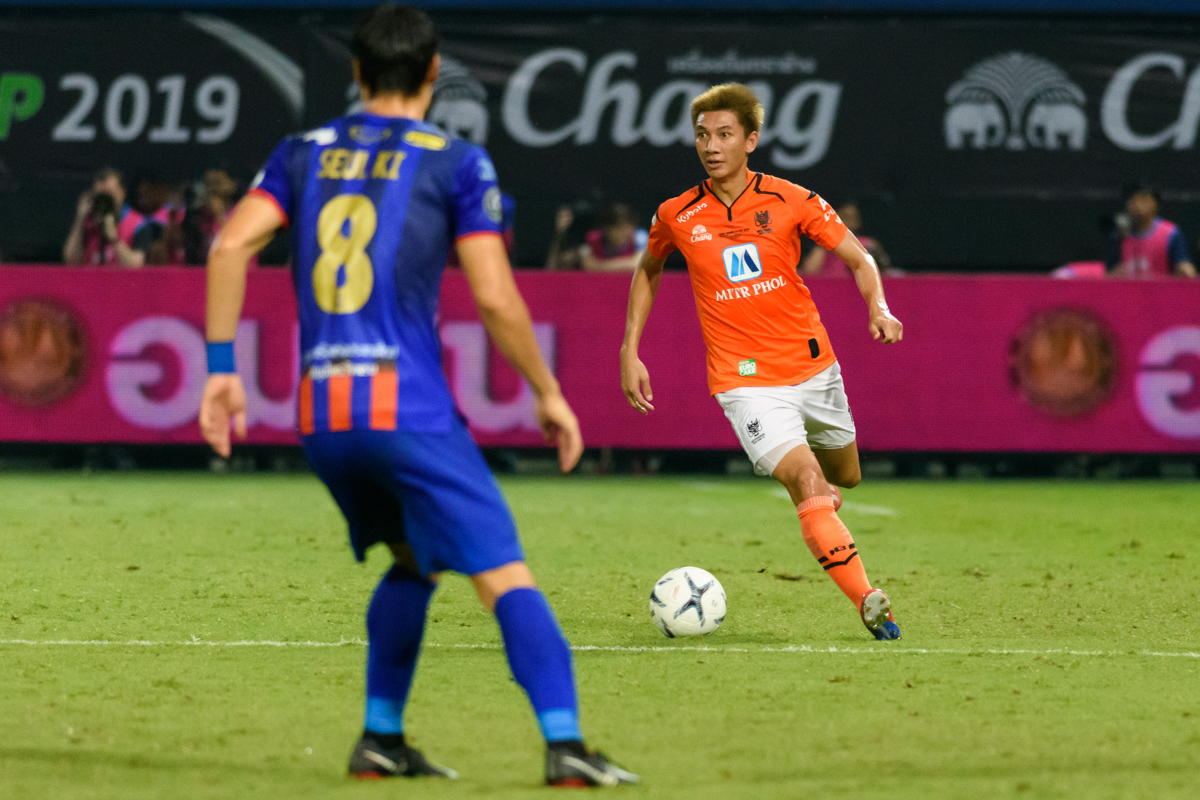
- Ekkaluck (right)

Personal information
- Full name: Ekkaluck Thongkit
- Date of birth: 27 August 1983 (age 43)
- Place of birth: Nan, Thailand
- Height: 1.78 m (5 ft 10 in)
- Positions: Left back; centre back

Youth career
- 2006: Debsirin School

Senior career*
Years	Team	Apps	(Gls)
2007–2008	Raj Pracha	39	(0)
2009	Hoàng Anh Gia Lai	4	(0)
2009	Pluakdaeng Rayong United	22	(0)
2010	Chiangmai	31	(0)
2011–2012	TTM FC	64	(0)
2013–2021	Ratchaburi Mitr Phol	189	(0)
2018	→ Buriram United (loan)	3	(0)
Total		352	(0)
- * Club domestic league appearances and goals as of 15:01, 27 October 2021 (UTC)

Ekkaluck Thongkit (Thai: เอกลักษณ์ ทองกริต, born August 27, 1983), simply known as Ekk (Thai: เอก), is a Thai retired professional footballer who plays as a left back or centre back.

== Honours ==
=== Club ===
Chiangmai

- Regional League Northern Division: 2010
