= Yoo Jun-soo =

South Korean footballer (born 1988)

Yoo Jun-Soo
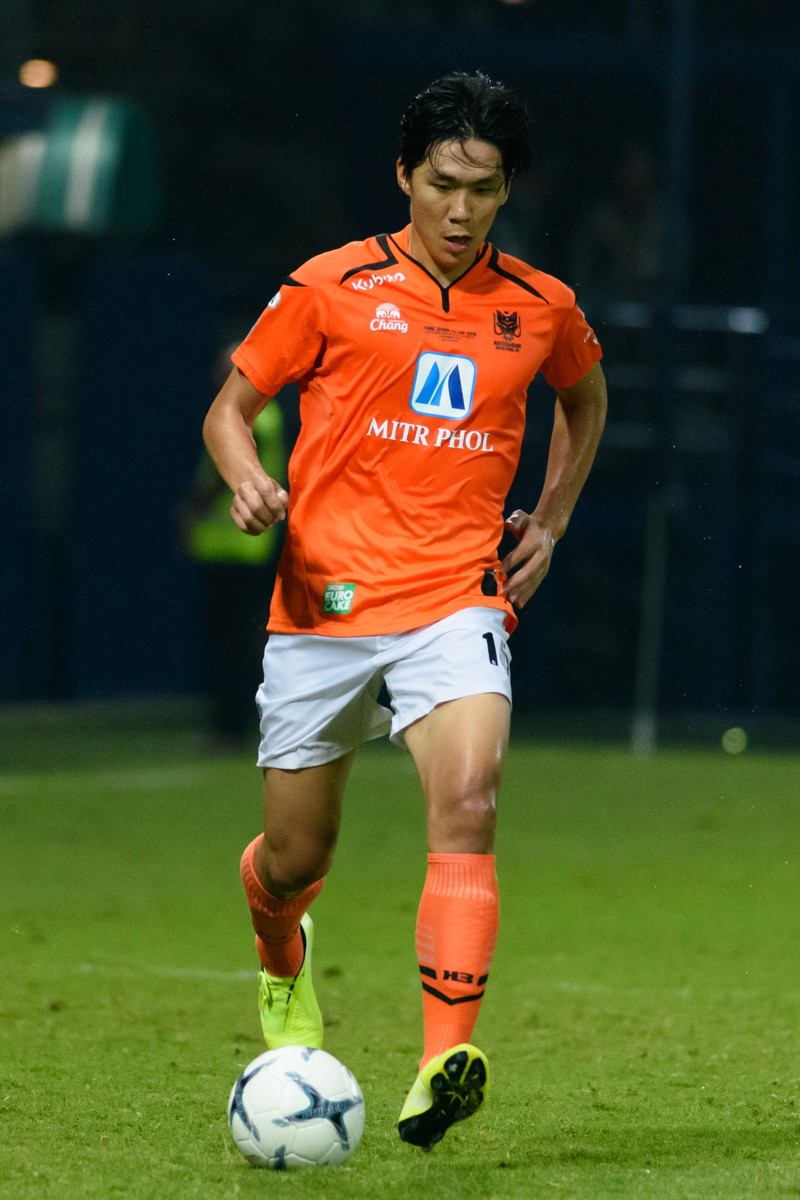

Personal information
- Full name: Yoo Jun-Soo
- Date of birth: 8 May 1988 (age 38)
- Place of birth: South Korea
- Height: 1.84 m (6 ft 1/2 in)
- Positions: Defensive midfielder; defender

Team information
- Current team: Chungnam Asan FC
- Number: 16

Youth career
- 2007–2010: Korea University

Senior career*
Years	Team	Apps	(Gls)
2011–2012	Incheon United	22	(0)
2013	Gyeongju KHNP	32	(7)
2014–2017	Ulsan Hyundai	39	(4)
2016–2017	→ Sangju Sangmu (army)	25	(2)
2018	Buriram United	34	(4)
2019	Pohang Steelers	6	(0)
2019	→ Ratchaburi Mitr Phol (loan)	11	(4)
2020–2021	PT Prachuap	16	(0)
2021–2022	Chungnam Asan FC	40	(2)
2023	Ansan Greeners FC	16	(1)
- * Club domestic league appearances and goals as of 22 December 2024

Yoo Jun-Soo (Korean: 유준수; born 8 May 1988) is a South Korean former footballer who played for a number of clubs in the K League 1, K League 2 and Korea National League. He also played in the Thai League 1 for a time, including in 2018 for Buriram United F.C. when the club won the championship.

== Club career ==
Yoo, a draftee from the 2011 K-League draft intake, was selected by Incheon United for the 2011 season. His professional debut was as a substitute in Incheon's opening match of the season, replacing the Brazilian import Luizinho in the side's loss to Sangju Sangmu. After regularly featuring in both the K-League and the League Cup, Yoo finally appeared on the score sheet with a goal in Incheon's FA Cup match against Yeonsei University on May 18, helping his team to a 2 - 1 win and ensuring Incheon progressed to the competition's round of 16.

For the 2013 season, Yoo dropped down to the Korea National League and joined Gyeongju KHNP. During the season he scored seven goals. He was signed by Ulsan Hyundai for 2014, returning to the K League 1. He remained with the club until the end of 2017, during which time he was loaned out to the military's Sangju Sangmu FC, which fulfilled his compulsory military service obligations.

In January 2018, Yoo signed for the Thai club Buriram United playing as a defensive midfielder and central defender.

== Club career statistics ==
As of 22 December 2024

Club performance			League		Cup		League Cup		Continental		Other		Total	
Season	Club	League	Apps	Goals	Apps	Goals	Apps	Goals	Apps	Goals	Apps	Goals	Apps	Goals
South Korea			League		KFA Cup		League Cup		AFC		Other		Total	
2011	Incheon United	K League 1	13	0	2	1	4	0	-		-		19	1
2012	Incheon United	K League 1	9	0	1	0	-		-		-		10	0
2013	Gyeongju KHNP	Korea National League	32	7	0	0	-		-		-		32	7
2014	Ulsan Hyundai	K League 1	23	3	1	1	-		4	2	-		28	6
2015	Ulsan Hyundai	K League 1	16	1	3	1	-		-		-		19	2
2016	Sangju Sangmu	K League 1	11	1	0	0	-		-		-		11	1
2017	Sangju Sangmu	K League 1	25	1	3	0	-		-		2	0	30	1
Thailand			League		FA Cup		League Cup		AFC		Other		Total	
2018	Buriram United	Thai League 1	34	4	1	0	1	0	8	1	0	0	44	5
South Korea			League		KFA Cup		League Cup		AFC		Other		Total	
2019	Pohang Steelers	K League 1	6	0	1	0	-		-		-		7	0
Thailand			League		FA Cup		League Cup		AFC		Other		Total	
2019	Ratchaburi	Thai League 1	14	4	4	2	1	0	-		-		19	6
2020–21	PT Prachuap	Thai League 1	16	0	1	0	-		-		-		19	6
South Korea			League		KFA Cup		League Cup		AFC		Other		Total	
2021	Chungnam Asan	K League 2	33	2	0	0	-		-		-		7	0
2022	Chungnam Asan	K League 2	7	0	0	0	-		-		-		7	0
2023	Ansan Greeners	K League 2	16	1	0	0	-		-		-		16	1
Career total			255	24	19	5	6	0	12	3	2	0	294	32
