= Javier Patiño =

Filipino footballer

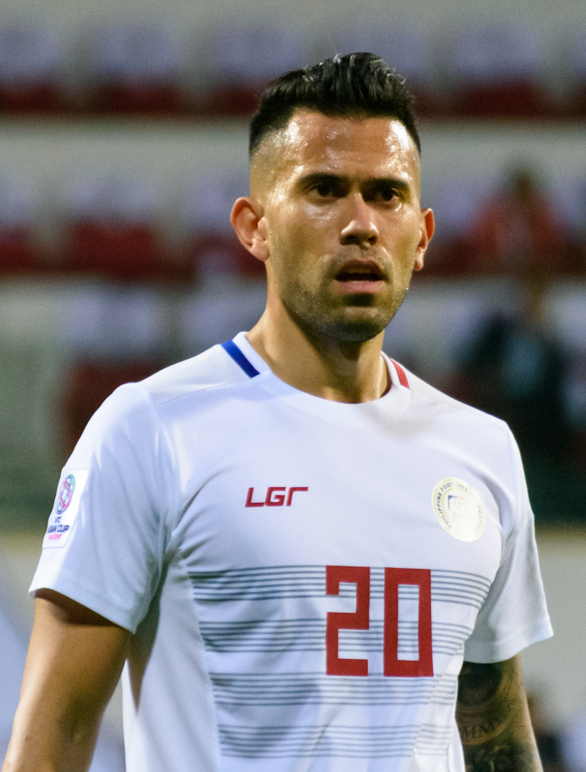
- Patiño with the Philippines at the 2019 AFC Asian Cup

Personal information
- Full name: Javier Lachica Patiño
- Birth name: Javier Patiño Lachica (Note: In this Spanish name, the first or paternal surname is Patiño and the second or maternal family name is Lachica.)
- Date of birth: February 14, 1988 (age 38)
- Place of birth: San Sebastián de los Reyes, Spain
- Height: 1.83 m (6 ft 0 in)
- Position: Striker

Youth career
- Alcobendas

Senior career*
Years	Team	Apps	(Gls)
2007–2008	Alcobendas	31	(13)
2008–2011	S.S. Reyes	70	(26)
2011–2013	Córdoba	52	(10)
2013	→ Xerez (loan)	4	(0)
2013–2015	Buriram United	54	(35)
2015–2018	Henan Jianye	60	(21)
2018–2019	Buriram United	20	(5)
2019	→ Ratchaburi Mitr Phol (loan)	12	(6)
2020–2021	Ratchaburi Mitr Phol	27	(6)
2021	Port	6	(1)
Total		336	(123)

International career
2013–2019	Philippines	20	(7)
- * Club domestic league appearances and goals

Javier Lachica Patiño (Spanish pronunciation: [xaˈβjeɾ paˈtiɲo]; born February 14, 1988) is a former professional footballer who played as a striker. He represented the Philippines national team from 2013 to 2019.

Born in Spain to a Spanish father and Filipino mother, Patiño began his career in the Divisiones Regionales and moved up to the Tercera División and Segunda División. He then played in the Chinese Super League and Thai League 1, notably with Buriram United where he won several accolades.

== Early life ==
Patiño was born in San Sebastián de los Reyes, Community of Madrid, to a Spanish father and a Filipino mother from Dumanjug, Cebu.

== Club career ==
=== Córdoba ===
Patiño played his first four seasons as a senior in amateur football, representing local clubs Alcobendas CF and UD San Sebastián de los Reyes. In summer 2011 he moved straight to the second division, signing a three-year contract with Córdoba CF.

In his first year with the Andalusians, Patiño scored eight goals in 35 games, notably netting the games' only goal against SD Huesca (away), UD Las Palmas (home) and Recreativo de Huelva (away). On the last day of the January 2013 transfer window, he was loaned to fellow league side Xerez CD until the end of the season.

=== Buriram ===
Patiño terminated his contract with Córdoba on 9 March 2013, joining Buriram United F.C. of the Thai Premier League shortly after. He marked his debut for his new team with a brace of goals in their 6–1 thrashing of Songkhla United FC.

=== Henan Jianye ===
On 21 January 2015, Patiño transferred to Chinese Super League club Henan Jianye FC. He scored twice on his debut on 8 March, helping his team to a 3–1 home win against Tianjin Teda FC.

On 20 February 2018, as he was nursing a knee injury, Patiño was released and Henan refused to pay him his due wages.

=== Return to Buriram ===
In April 2018, Patiño returned to Buriram United.

=== Retirement ===
Patiño retired from competitive football in November 2021, last playing for Thai League 1 side Port F.C.

== International career ==
The Philippine Football Federation were reportedly notified of Patiño through Juan Luis Guirado, who was also born in Spain and an international footballer for the Philippines. In late 2012, he was reported to be applying for Filipino citizenship to open the possibility of playing international football for that country. He successfully obtained his Filipino passport just in time for the 2014 AFC Challenge Cup qualification tournament which took place from 24 to 26 March 2013 in Manila, and made it into the final 23-man squad,.

Juani [Guirado] told me it would be a good experience. My mother was very emotional. It's always been her hope that we reconnect with family and relatives who we haven't seen for a long time. What I learn in Spain I will try to impart to the team. I didn't imagine [joining the Philippines national team] last year, but I'm here to help.

— Patiño, on his decision to play for the Philippines

Patiño made his debut on 24 March 2013 in the opening game of the Challenge Cup qualifying campaign, scoring twice in an 8–0 win against Cambodia. Two days later, against Turkmenistan, he again played the full 90 minutes, helping his team win 1–0 as they qualified for the finals.

Patiño would not appear for the Philippines until March the following year, where they lost 0–1 to Azerbaijan in a friendly match. It was part of the national team's preparations for the AFC Challenge Cup which he was not able to take part in due to not being released by his club, as the tournament was not part of FIFA's international match calendar; later that year, he would also miss out on 2014 AFF Championship as he had to undergo back surgery.

== Career statistics ==
=== Club ===
Appearances and goals by club, season and competition
Club	Season	League			Cup (Note: Includes Copa del Rey)		Continental (Note: Includes AFC Champions League)		Total	
Club	Season	Division	Apps	Goals	Apps	Goals	Apps	Goals	Apps	Goals
Córdoba	2011–12	Segunda División	35	8	4	0	—		39	8
Córdoba	2012–13	Segunda División	17	2	4	2	—		21	4
Córdoba	Total		52	10	8	2	—		60	12
Xerez	2012–13	Segunda División	4	0	0	0	—		4	0
Buriram United	2013	Thai Premier League	20	14	6	2	1	0	27	16
Buriram United	2014	Thai Premier League	34	21	7	4	0	0	41	25
Buriram United	Total		54	35	13	6	1	0	68	41
Henan Jianye	2015	Chinese Super League	27	11	2	1	—		29	12
Henan Jianye	2016	Chinese Super League	28	8	2	1	—		30	9
Henan Jianye	2017	Chinese Super League	5	2	0	0	—		5	2
Henan Jianye	Total		60	21	4	2	—		64	23
Buriram United	2018	Thai Premier League	11	4	5	3	0	0	16	7
Career total			181	70	30	13	1	0	212	83

=== International ===
As of 5 September 2019 (Philippines score listed first, score column indicates score after each Patiño goal)

No.	Date	Venue	Opponent	Score	Result	Competition
2013
1.	24 March 2013	Rizal Memorial Stadium, Manila, Philippines	Cambodia	4–0	8–0	2014 AFC Challenge Cup qualification
2.	24 March 2013	Rizal Memorial Stadium, Manila, Philippines	Cambodia	6–0	8–0	2014 AFC Challenge Cup qualification
2015
3.	11 June 2015	Philippine Sports Stadium, Bulacan, Philippines	Bahrain	2–0	2–1	2018 FIFA World Cup qualification
2017
4.	28 March 2017	Rizal Memorial Stadium, Manila, Philippines	Nepal	4–1	4–1	2019 AFC Asian Cup qualification
5.	13 June 2017	Pamir Stadium, Dushanbe, Tajikistan	Tajikistan	2–0	4–3	2019 AFC Asian Cup qualification
6.	13 June 2017	Pamir Stadium, Dushanbe, Tajikistan	Tajikistan	3–0	4–3	2019 AFC Asian Cup qualification
2019
7.	5 September 2019	Panaad Stadium, Bacolod, Philippines	Syria	1–0	2–5	2022 FIFA World Cup qualification

== Honours ==
Buriram United

- Thai League 1: 2013, 2014, 2018
- Thai FA Cup: 2013
- Thai League Cup: 2013
- Thailand Champions Cup: 2019
- Kor Royal Cup: 2014

Individual

- Thai League Dream ASEAN XI
