= Keeratikorn Nilmart =

Thai footballer (born 1992)

Personal information
- Full name: Keeratikorn Nilmart
- Date of birth: 20 May 1992 (age 34)
- Place of birth: Surat Thani, Thailand
- Height: 1.82 m (5 ft 11 1/2 in)
- Position: Centre-back

Senior career*
Years	Team	Apps	(Gls)
2016	Super Power Samut Prakan	6	(0)
2017	Samut Sakhon		
2018–2019	Lampang	20	(1)
2020	Chiangmai United	1	(0)
2020	Trat	0	(0)
2021	Rajpracha	5	(0)
2021–2022	Chainat Hornbill	36	(2)
2023	Mahasarakham	16	(1)
- * Club domestic league appearances and goals as of 6 May 2024

Keeratikorn Nilmart (Thai: กีรติกรณ์ นิลมาศ, born 20 May 1992) is a Thai professional footballer who plays as a centre-back.

== Honours ==
=== Club ===
Mahasarakham SBT

- Thai League 3 Northeastern Region: 2022–23
