= Kevin Sangsamanan =

Thai footballer

Personal information
- Full name: Kevin Sangsamanan
- Date of birth: 20 May 1997 (age 29)
- Place of birth: Surin, Thailand
- Height: 1.90 m (6 ft 3 in)
- Position: Goalkeeper

Senior career*
Years	Team	Apps	(Gls)
2015	AFC Eskilstuna	10	(0)
2016–2017	Vallentuna BK	23	(0)
2018	Buriram United	0	(0)
2019–2020	Chiangrai United	0	(0)
2019	→ Chiangmai (loan)	1	(0)
Total		34	(0)
- * Club domestic league appearances and goals

Kevin Sangsamanan (Thai: เควิน สังสมานันท์; born 20 May 1997) is a Thai former professional footballer who plays as a goalkeeper.

== Career ==
After failing to make a league appearance for Swedish fifth division side Vallentuna BK, Sangsamanan signed for Buriram United, one of the most successful Thai teams, where he again failed to make an appearance. Then he moved to Chiangrai United in 2019.

In 2019, he was loaned from Chiangrai United to fellow Thai top club, Chiangmai, making 1 league appearance there substituting for the goalkeeper Narit Taweekul who broke his right middle finger 15 minutes into a game.

== Personal life ==
Sangsamanan is of French, Swedes and Thai heritage.
