= Pornthep Chankai =

Thai footballer (born 1984)

Personal information
- Full name: Pornthep Chankai
- Date of birth: 14 November 1984 (age 41)
- Place of birth: Thailand
- Height: 1.78 m (5 ft 10 in)
- Position: Centre-back

Team information
- Current team: Sisaket United
- Number: 5

Senior career*
Years	Team	Apps	(Gls)
2017–2019	Chainat Hornbill	40	(1)
2020–2021	Nongbua Pitchaya	8	(0)
2021–2022	Sukhothai	12	(0)
2022–	Sisaket United	23	(1)
- * Club domestic league appearances and goals as of 6 May 2023

Pornthep Chankai (Thai: พรเทพ จันทร์ไข่, born November 11, 1984) is a Thai professional footballer who plays as a centre-back for Thai League 3 club Sisaket United.

== Honours ==
Nongbua Pitchaya

- Thai League 2: 2020-21
