= Kim Gyeong-min =

South Korean footballer (born 1990)

Personal information
- Date of birth: 15 August 1990 (age 36)
- Place of birth: South Korea
- Height: 1.85 m (6 ft 1 in)
- Position: Centre-back

Team information
- Current team: Hwaseong FC

Senior career*
Years	Team	Apps	(Gls)
2013–2017	Incheon United	24	(0)
2013	→ Bucheon FC 1995 (loan)	13	(1)
2014–2015	→ Sangju Sangmu (army)	1	(0)
2018	Chonburi	27	(1)
2019	Trat	0	(0)
2019	Chonburi	21	(0)
2020	Gyeongnam FC	8	(0)
2021-	Hwaseong FC	34	(4)
- * Club domestic league appearances and goals as of 15:47 22 October 2022(AEST)

Kim Gyeong-min (Korean: 김경민; born 15 August 1990) is a South Korean footballer for Hwaseong FC of K3 League.
