= Teerath Nakchamnarn =

Thai footballer

Personal information
- Full name: Teerath Nakchamnarn
- Date of birth: 25 May 1986 (age 40)
- Place of birth: Surat Thani, Thailand
- Height: 1.85 m (6 ft 1 in)
- Position: Goalkeeper

Youth career
- 2004–2006: Bangkok United

Senior career*
Years	Team	Apps	(Gls)
2007–2009	Bangkok United	16	(0)
2010	Samutsongkhram	1	(0)
2011	Songkhla United	0	(0)
2012–2017	Ratchaburi Mitr Phol	16	(0)
2017–2019	Chainat Hornbill	44	(0)
2020	Nongbua Pitchaya	1	(0)
2021–2022	Khon Kaen United	2	(0)
2022–2023	Customs United	1	(0)
2023–2026	Ayutthaya United	1	(0)
- * Club domestic league appearances and goals as of 26 April 2026

Teerath Nakchamnarn (Thai: ธีรัตม์ นาคชำนาญ, born 25 May 1986), or Chayoot Nakchamnarn (Thai: ชยุตย์ นาคชำนาญ) is a Thai professional footballer who plays as a goalkeeper.

== Honours ==
=== Club ===
Ratchaburi

- Thai Division 1 League: 2012

Chainat Hornbill

- Thai League 2: 2017

Nongbua Pitchaya

- Thai League 2: 2020–21
