= Michaël N'dri =

French footballer (born 1984)

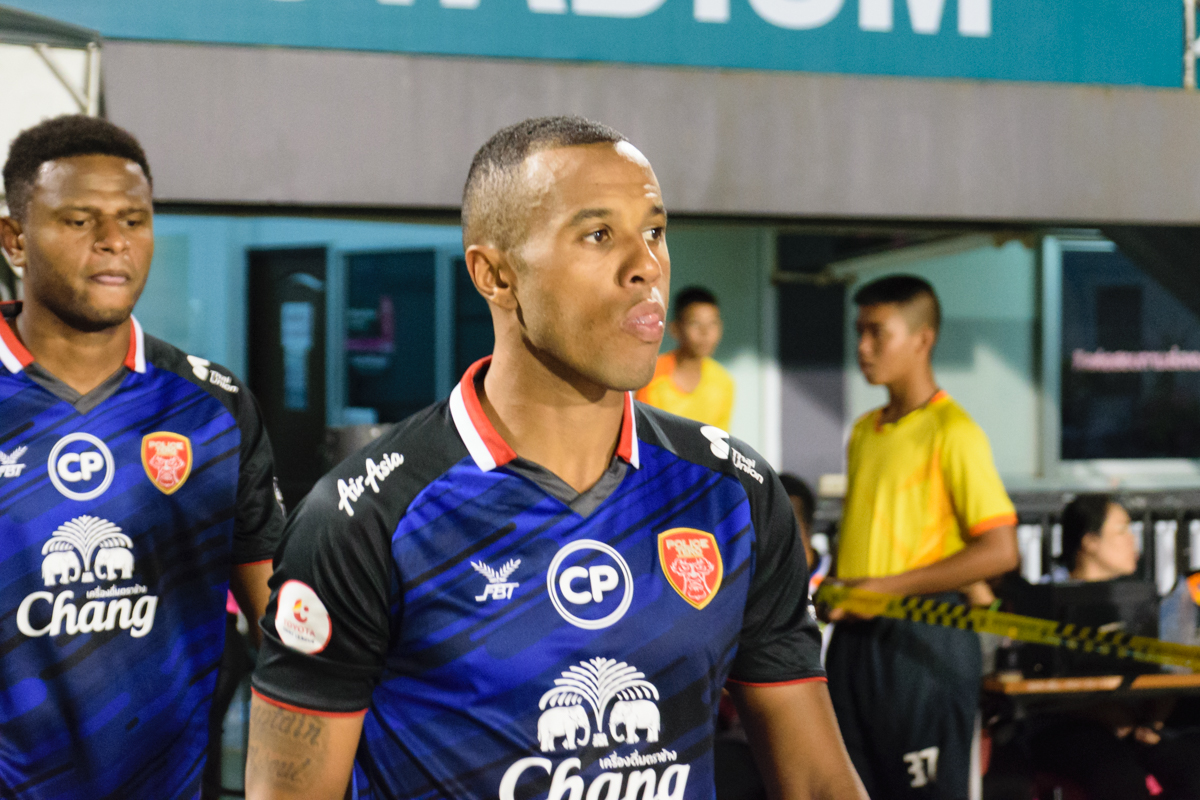
- Ndri with Police Tero

Personal information
- Full name: Michaël N'dri
- Date of birth: 1 November 1984 (age 42)
- Place of birth: Salon-de-Provence, France
- Height: 1.80 m (5 ft 11 in)
- Position: Striker

Youth career
- FC Salon de Provence
- Val Durance Fa

Senior career*
| Years | Team | Apps | (Gls) |
| 2003–2005 | FC Sète | 56 | (9) |
| 2006–2007 | Sporting Toulon Var | 42 | (11) |
| 2007–2008 | R. Charleroi S.C. | 22 | (4) |
| 2008–2010 | Al-Ittihad | 51 | (71) |
| 2010–2011 | Dubai C.S.C. | 18 | (8) |
| 2011–2012 | Al-Sailiya | 18 | (21) |
| 2012–2016 | Al-Shaab | 81 | (52) |
| 2016 | Muangthong United | 27 | (8) |
| 2017–2018 | Police Tero | 57 | (31) |
| 2019–2021 | Lee Man | 22 | (14) |
| Total | | 394 | (229) |
- * Club domestic league appearances and goals as of 28 February 2021

Michaël N'dri (born 1 November 1984) is a French former professional footballer who played as a striker.

== Club career ==
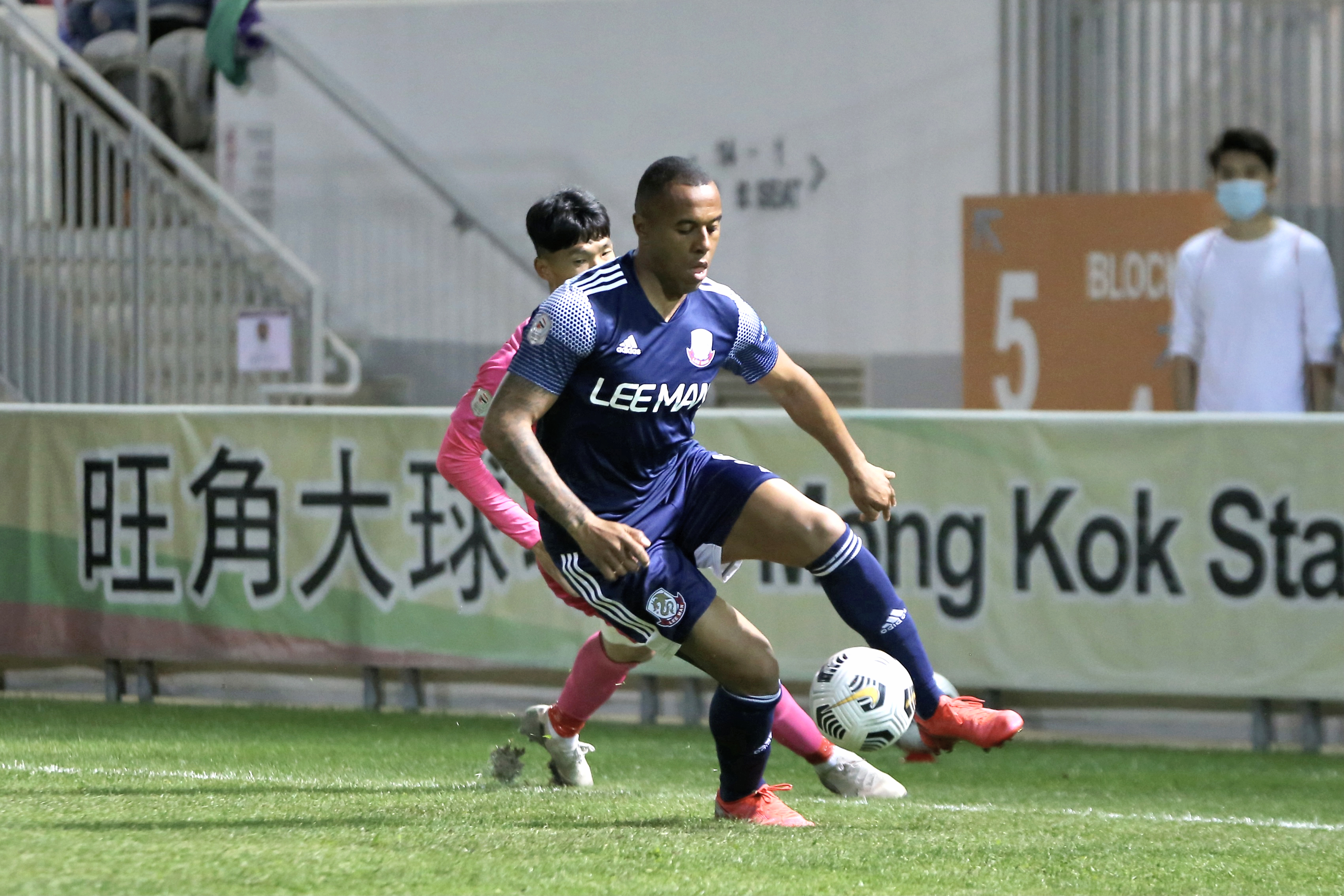
N'dri in the final match of his career in 2021

N'dri played in his youth career for FC Salon de Provence and Val Durance Fa. In 2003, he started his professional career with FC Sète, where he played for two and a half years. He then joined Sporting Toulon Var in January 2006. On 27 June 2007 he signed a two-year contract for R. Charleroi S.C. after scoring 7 goals in 28 games in the 2006/2007 season for Sporting Toulon Var. After one season, on 8 August 2008, he terminated his contract with Sporting Charleroi and signed for Al-Ittihad in the UAE League.

On 5 January 2019, it was announced that N'dri would join Hong Kong Premier League club Lee Man. On 24 May 2020, he re-signed with Lee Man for a further year.

On 28 February 2021, N'dri announced his retirement from professional football.

== Honours ==
Muangthong United

- Thai League 1: 2016
- Thai League Cup: 2016

Lee Man

- Hong Kong Sapling Cup: 2018–19
