= 2026–27 Port F.C. season =

Port
2026–27 season
- Chairman: (Thailand) Photipong Lamsam
- Manager: (Thailand) Sarawut Treephan (till 25 Sept) (Montenegro) Božidar Bandović
- Stadium: PAT Stadium, Khlong Toei, Bangkok, Thailand
Home colours	Away colours	Third colours

The 2026–27 season is Port's 10th consecutive season in Thailand's top flight in Thai Football, after being promoted from Thai League 2 in 2016. This season, Port will participate in 4 competitions which consist of the Thai League, FA Cup, League Cup, AFC Champions League Elite and ASEAN Club Championship.

== Squad ==
As of 6 February 2025

Squad No.	Name	Nationality	Date of birth (age)	Previous club
Goalkeepers
1	Somporn Yos	(Thailand)	23 June 1993 (age 33)	(Thailand) Muangthong United
35	Sarawut Konglarp	(Thailand)	31 October 1987 (age 39)	(Thailand) Samut Sakhon City
40	Rangsiman Kemmueang	(Thailand)	16 January 2008 (age 18)	Youth team
93	Michael Falkesgaard	(Philippines) (Denmark)	9 April 1991 (age 35)	(Denmark) B.93
Defenders
3	Asnawi Mangkualam	(Indonesia)	4 October 1999 (age 27)	(South Korea) Jeonnam Dragons
4	Suphanan Bureerat	(Thailand)	10 December 1993 (age 32)	(Thailand) Samut Prakan City
13	Matheus Lins	(Brazil)	24 March 2001 (age 25)	(Moldova) FC Sheriff Tiraspol
15	Manuel Bihr	(Thailand) (Germany)	17 August 1993 (age 33)	(Thailand) Bangkok United
16	Chinnawat Wongchai	(Thailand)	8 December 1996 (age 29)	(Thailand) Buriram United
20	Marcel Scalese	(Brazil)	17 April 1996 (age 30)	(Brazil) Amazonas
25	Chaiyaphon Otton	(Thailand)	4 April 2003 (age 23)	(Thailand) Sukhothai
28	Erik Sviatchenko	(Denmark) (Ukraine)	4 October 1991 (age 35)	(United States) Houston Dynamo
34	Nitipong Selanon	(Thailand)	25 May 1993 (age 33)	(Thailand) Bangkok United
36	Peerawat Akkratum	(Thailand)	3 December 1998 (age 27)	(Thailand) Prachuap
Midfielders
5	Peeradon Chamratsamee	(Thailand)	15 September 1992 (age 34)	(Thailand) Buriram United
8	Tanaboon Kesarat (captain)	(Thailand)	21 May 1993 (age 33)	(Thailand) BG Pathum United
10	Bordin Phala	(Thailand)	20 December 1994 (age 31)	(Thailand) Buriram United
12	Kaká Mendes	(Brazil)	16 March 1993 (age 33)	(Saudi Arabia) Al-Jabalain
21	Sivakorn Tiatrakul	(Thailand)	7 July 1994 (age 32)	(Thailand) BG Pathum United
22	Worachit Kanitsribampen	(Thailand)	24 August 1997 (age 29)	(Thailand) BG Pathum United
24	Jakkaphan Kaewprom	(Thailand)	24 May 1988 (age 38)	(Thailand) Buriram United
33	Noboru Shimura	(Japan)	11 March 1993 (age 33)	(Serbia) FK Spartak Subotica
38	Natthakit Phosri	(Thailand)	8 February 2008 (age 18)	Youth team
47	Sittha Boonlha	(Thailand)	2 September 2004 (age 22)	(Thailand) Assumption United
77	Hugo Boutsingkham	(Thailand) (France)	20 January 2003 (age 23)	(France) Nantes B
88	Carlos Jatobá	(Brazil)	24 May 1988 (age 38)	(South Korea) Daegu
Forwards
7	Essam Al-Sabhi	(Oman)	1 May 1997 (age 29)	(Iraq) Al-Quwa
9	Ruan Ribeiro	(Brazil)	15 August 2003 (age 23)	(Brazil) Vila Nova
11	Bruno Moreira	(Brazil)	8 April 1999 (age 27)	(Indonesia) Persebaya Surabaya
14	Teerasak Poeiphimai	(Thailand)	21 September 2002 (age 24)	(Thailand) Prime Bangkok
17	Seksan Ratree	(Thailand)	14 March 2003 (age 23)	(Thailand) Rayong
18	Jude Soonsup-Bell	(Thailand) (England)	10 January 2004 (age 22)	(England) Grimsby Town
19	Rui Costa	(Portugal)	20 February 1996 (age 30)	(Portugal) Farense
27	Lucas Tocantins	(Brazil)	25 July 1994 (age 32)	(Brazil) Volta Redonda
Players loaned out
6	Chanukun Karin	(Thailand)	24 April 1997 (age 29)	(Thailand) Police Tero
20	Phakhawat Sapso (FW)	(Thailand)	20 November 2005 (age 21)	(Thailand) Monthongwitaya School
27	Thiti Thumporn (D)	(Thailand)	27 April 1999 (age 27)	(Thailand) Nakhon Ratchasima
	Sorawat Phosaman (G)	(Thailand)	30 January 2003 (age 23)	(Thailand) Songkhla
	Pichitchai Sienkrthok (D)	(Thailand)	18 March 2003 (age 23)	(Thailand) Police Tero
29	Caelan Tanadon Ryan	(Thailand) (England)	12 October 2005 (age 21)	(Thailand) Police Tero
Players left during season

== Management and staff ==
Position	Name
Owner	(Thailand) Chalermchoke Lamsam
Chairman	(Thailand) Photipong Lamsam
Club Advisor	(Thailand) Dr. Ongart Korsintha
Head coach	(Thailand) Sarawut Treephan
Assistant coach	(Thailand) Jakarat Tonhongsa (Thailand) Wichitchai Hatsap (Brazil) Luis Viegas (Serbia) Zarko Dalovic
Goalkeeper coach	(Brazil) Beto Guastali
Physical & Fitness coach	(Brazil) Vitor Oliveira (Thailand) Krittapol Dangkulau
Conditioning coach & Video analyst	(Thailand) Peerapong Cheuaithaisong
Physiologist	(Serbia) Dejan Tosevski (Thailand) Borworn Raiwichai
Masseur	(Thailand) Warun Petcharat
Interpreter	(Thailand) Jirapat Jarurat
Team Coordinator	(Thailand) Waroot Phongkanittanon
Kit man	(Thailand) Prapatpong Sripo (Thailand) Phanthakan Kaeokoed

== Transfer ==
=== In ===
Pre-Season

Date	Position	Player	Transferred from	Fee	Ref
First team
15 May 2026	DF	(Thailand) Chaiyaphon Otton	(Thailand) Sukhothai	Free	
16 May 2026	DF	(Thailand) (Germany) Manuel Bihr	(Thailand) Bangkok United	Free	
19 May 2026	DF	(Thailand) Nitipong Selanon	(Thailand) Bangkok United	Free	
27 May 2026	MF	(Thailand) Jakkaphan Kaewprom	(Thailand) Ratchaburi	Free	
1 June 2026	GK	(Thailand) Worawut Srisupha	(Thailand) Rayong	End of Loan	
1 June 2026	DF	(Thailand) Pichitchai Sienkrthok	(Thailand) Nakhon Ratchasima	End of Loan	
1 June 2026	MF	(Thailand) Sirawut Kengnok	(Thailand) Trat	End of Loan	
1 June 2026	MF	(Thailand) Tanasith Siripala	(Thailand) Kanchanaburi Power	End of Loan	
1 June 2026	FW	(Thailand) (England) Caelan Tanadon Ryan	(Thailand) Police Tero	End of loan	
1 June 2026	FW	(Thailand) Thanakrit Phonthongthin	(Thailand) Nakhon Pathom United (T2)	End of Loan	
1 June 2026	FW	(Thailand) Phakhawat Sapso	(Thailand) Thonburi	End of Loan	
1 June 2026	FW	(Thailand) Phuthanet Somjit	(Thailand) Navy	End of Loan	
3 June 2026	FW	(Brazil) Bruno Moreira	(Indonesia) Persebaya Surabaya	Free	
7 June 2026	FW	(Oman) Essam Al-Sabhi	(Iraq) Al-Quwa	Free	
10 June 2026	GK	(Thailand) Sorawat Phosaman	(Thailand) Songkhla	Free	
12 June 2026	FW	(Thailand) Seksan Ratree	(Thailand) Buriram United	Season loan	
13 June 2026	FW	(Brazil) Ruan Ribeiro	(Brazil) Vila Nova	Free	
17 June 2026	DF	(Brazil) Marcel Scalese	(Brazil) Amazonas	Free	
20 June 2026	MF	(Brazil) Jatobá	(South Korea) Daegu	Free	
21 July 2026	FW	(Portugal) Rui Costa	(Portugal) Farense	Free	
26 July 2026	FW	(Thailand) (England) Jude Soonsup-Bell	(England) Grimsby Town	Free; 4 years contract till Jun-2030	
31 August 2026	DF	(Denmark) (Ukraine) Erik Sviatchenko	(United States) Houston Dynamo	Free	
Academy

Mid-season

Date	Position	Player	Transferred To	Fee	Ref
First team
Academy

=== Out ===
Pre-Season

Date	Position	Player	Transferred To	Fee	Ref
First team
31 May 2026	FW	(Thailand) (Norway) Athit Berg	(Thailand) Buriram United	End of loan	
1 June 2026	DF	(Singapore) (South Africa) Irfan Fandi	(Singapore) Tampines Rovers	Free	
1 June 2026	FW	(Brazil) Leonardo Kalil	(Kazakhstan) FC Irtysh Pavlodar	Free	
1 June 2026	FW	(Colombia) Brayan Perea	(Vietnam) Cong An Hanoi	Free	
2 June 2026	MF	(Thailand) Chaiyawat Buran	(Thailand) Pattani	Free	
5 June 2026	GK	(Thailand) Worawut Srisupha	(Thailand) Rayong	Free	
1 July 2026	MF	(Thailand) Tanasith Siripala	(Thailand) BG Pathum United	Free	
1 July 2026	FW	(Thailand) Phakhawat Sapso	(Thailand) Thonburi	Free	
6 July 2026	GK	(Thailand) Sorawat Phosaman	(Thailand) Pattani	Season loan	
6 July 2026	DF	(Thailand) Pichitchai Sienkrthok	(Thailand) Ayutthaya United	Season Loan	
6 July 2026	MF	(Thailand) Chanukun Karin	(Thailand) Ayutthaya United	Season Loan	
16 July 2026	FW	(Thailand) (England) Caelan Tanadon Ryan	(Thailand) Nakhon Si United	Season loan	
22 July 2026	MF	(Thailand) Sirawut Kengnok	(Thailand) Chanthaburi	Free	
24 August 2026	DF	(Iraq) (Sweden) Rebin Sulaka	(Thailand)	Free	
Academy
22 July 2026	MF	(Thailand) Tanapat Hongkhiao	(Thailand) Samui United	Season loan	
10 September 2026	MF	(Thailand) Natthakit Phosri	(Singapore) Hougang United	Season loan	
10 September 2026	MF	(Thailand) Phutanet Somjit	(Singapore) Hougang United	Season loan	

Mid-season

Date	Position	Player	Transferred To	Fee	Ref
First team
Academy

=== Extension and retained ===
Position	Player	Ref
MF	(Thailand) Peeradol Chamrasamee	3-years extension signed 18 Oct 26 till June 2030
MF	(Thailand) Bordin Phala	1-year extension signed 7 Nov 26 till June 2028

== Pre-season and friendlies ==
Win Draw Loss

18 July 2026 1	Port (Thailand)	1–0	Thailand U-20	Bangkok
				Stadium: PAT Stadium

22 July 2026 2	Port (Thailand)	8–1	(Thailand) Chamchuri United	Bangkok
	Carlos Jatoba; Lucas Tocantins; Ruan Ribeiro			Stadium: PAT Stadium

26 July 2026 President Cup Match 1	PSMS Medan (Indonesia)	0–2	(Thailand) Port	Surabaya, Indonesia
			Noboru Shimura 16'; Issam Al-Sabhi 54'	Stadium: Gelora Bung Tomo Stadium; Attendance: 31,080; Referee: Yudai Yamamoto (Japan)

29 July 2026 President Cup Match 2	Persija Jakarta (Indonesia)	2–2	(Thailand) Port	Surabaya, Indonesia
	Peeradol 18'; Al Sabhi 40'		Arlyansyah 42'; Lončar 52'	Stadium: Gelora Bung Tomo Stadium; Attendance: 532; Referee: Nazmi Nasaruddin (Malaysia)

1 August 2026 President Cup Match 3	Persebaya Surabaya (Indonesia)	2–1	(Thailand) Port	Surabaya, Indonesia
	Miguel Pereira 40'; Alex Martin 47'		Issam Al-Sabhi 30'	Stadium: Gelora Bung Tomo Stadium

Pos	Team	Pld	W	D	L	GF	GA	GD	Pts	Qualification
1	(Indonesia) Persebaya (H, A)	3	3	0	0	4	1	+3	9	Advance to the Semi-Final
2	(Indonesia) Persija	3	1	1	1	6	4	+2	4	Advance to the Semi-Final
3	(Thailand) Port	3	1	1	1	5	4	+1	4	
4	(Indonesia) PSMS	3	0	0	3	1	7	−6	0	

First match(es) will be played: 26 July 2026. Source:
Rules for classification: Tiebreakers
(A) Advance to a further round; (H) Hosts

13 August 2026 6	Port (Thailand)	4-1	(Thailand) Nakhon Si United	Bangkok
	Jude Spoon; Bruno; Noboru Shimura			Stadium: PAT Stadium

15 August 2026 7	Samui United (Thailand)	0–2	(Thailand) Port	Surat
				Stadium: Ko Samui City Municipality International Stadium

26 August 2026 8	Port (Thailand)	1–0	(Thailand) Ratchaburi	Bangkok
				Stadium: PAT Stadium

29 August 2026 9	Buriram United (Thailand)	2–1	(Thailand) Port	Buriram
	Kenny Dougall 25'; Nathan Neale 85'		Matheus Lins 14'	Stadium: Chang Arena

== Competitions ==
=== Overview ===
Competition	First match	Last match	Starting round	Record							
Competition	First match	Last match	Starting round	Pld	W	D	L	GF	GA	GD	Win %
Thai League 1	5 September 2026		Matchday 1	7	5	1	1	15	8	+7	71.43
Thai FA Cup	21 October 2026		First round	1	1	0	0	3	1	+2	100.00
Thai League Cup				0	0	0	0	0	0	+0	—
AFC Champions League Elite	15 September 2026		League stage	4	1	0	3	9	14	−5	25.00
ASEAN Club Championship	8 October 2026		Group stage	2	0	0	2	2	7	−5	0.00
Total				14	7	1	6	29	30	−1	50.00

Last updated: 19 November 2026
Source: Competitions

=== Thai League 1 ===
==== Matches ====
Win Draw Loss

5 September 2026 1	Rasisalai United	1–2	Port	Ubon Ratchathani
	Ricardo Cardoso 16'; Somyos Pongsuwan (yellow card) 15'; Yuga Watanabe (yellow card) 23'; Gabriel Davis (yellow card) 75'; Ramon Mesquita (yellow card) 76'; Nattapon Malapun (yellow card) 78'; Piyawat Petra (yellow card) 88'		Peeradol Chamrasamee 44'; Marcel Scalese 86'; Worachit Kanitsribampen (yellow card) 72'; Teerasak Poeiphimai (yellow card) 90+6'	Stadium: UMT Stadium; Attendance: 2,169; Referee: Chaireag Ngam-som

11 September 2026 2	Port	2–1	Lamphun Warriors	Bangkok
	Essam Al-Sabhi 14' (pen.); Teerasak Poeiphimai 77'; Noboru Shimura (yellow card) 73'; Chinnawat Wongchai (yellow card) 90+3'		Rodrigo Maranhão 61'; Peerawat Akkratum (yellow card) 45+3'; Luis Fellipe (yellow card) 64'	Stadium: PAT Stadium; Attendance: 4,746; Referee: Noppadet Mangngam

20 September 2026 3	Sukhothai	2–1	Port	Sukhothai
	Jefferson 6'; Nathan Palafoz 31'; Alberto Moreira Gouvea (yellow card) 40'; Tassanapong Mhuaddarak (yellow card) 79'		Peeradol Chamrasamee 3'	Stadium: Thalay Luang Stadium; Attendance: 2,850; Referee: Wiwat Jumpaoon

11 October 2026 4	Port	3–2	Pattani	Bangkok
	Peeradol Chamrasamee 6'; Teerasak Poeiphimai 79'; Bruno Moreira 81'; Noboru Shimura (red card) 28'; Nitipong Selanon (yellow card) 30'		Jean-Pierre Da Sylva 54' (yellow card) 36'; Igor Neves 75'; Nattanan Biesamrit (yellow card) 22'; Chaiyawat Buran (yellow card) 45+2'	Stadium: PAT Stadium; Attendance: 6,250; Referee: Chaireag Ngam-som

18 October 2026 5	Bangkok United	0–2	Port	Pathum Thani
	Suphan Thongsong (yellow card) 45+3'		Worachit Kanitsribumphen 50'; Teerasak Poeiphimai 59'; Peerawat Akkratum (yellow card) 49'; Peeradol Chamrasamee (yellow card) 56'	Stadium: True BG Stadium; Attendance: 3,405; Referee: Mongkolchai Pechsri

24 October 2026 6	Port	4–1	Rayong	Bangkok
	Worachit Kanitsribumphen 6' (yellow card) 55'; Teerasak Poeiphimai 18' (yellow card) 12'; Bruno Moreira 22'; Peeradol Chamrasamee 65'; Chaiyaphon Otton (yellow card) 83'		João Felipe 62'; João Afonso (yellow card) 12'; Mayron Marques (yellow card) 66'	Stadium: PAT Stadium; Attendance: 5,206; Referee: Songkran Bunmeekiart

30 December 2026 7 (Rescheduled)	Chiangrai United	–	Port	Chiangrai
				Stadium: Singha Chiangrai Stadium

7 November 2026 8	Port	1–1	Chonburi	Bangkok
	Peeradol Chamrasamee 12'; Seksan Ratree (yellow card) 48'; Chaiyaphon Otton (yellow card) 53'; Teerasak Poeiphimai (yellow card) 69'		Dennis Murillo 62'; Jaturapat Satham (yellow card) 4'	Stadium: PAT Stadium; Attendance: 6,214; Referee: Chaireag Ngam-som

10 January 2026 9 (Rescheduled)	Sisaket United	–	Port	Sisaket
				Stadium: Sri Nakhon Lamduan Stadium

28 November 2026 10	Port	–	PT Prachuap	Bangkok
				Stadium: PAT Stadium

6 December 2026 11	Buriram United	–	Port	Buriram
				Stadium: Chang Arena

12 December 2026 12	Port	–	Ratchaburi	Bangkok
				Stadium: PAT Stadium

20 December 2026 13	BG Pathum United	–	Port	Pathum Thani
				Stadium: True BG Stadium

23 December 2026 14	Ayutthaya United	–	Port	Ayutthaya
				Stadium: Ayutthaya Province Stadium

26 December 2026 15	Port	–	Uthai Thani	Bangkok
				Stadium: PAT Stadium

31 January 2027 16	Lamphun Warriors	–	Port	Lamphun
				Stadium: Lamphun Warriors Stadium

7 February 2027 17	Port	–	Sukhothai	Bangkok
				Stadium: PAT Stadium

20 February 2027 18	Pattani	v	Port	Pattani
				Stadium: Pattani Province Stadium

28 February 2027 19	Port	–	Bangkok United	Bangkok
				Stadium: PAT Stadium

7 March 2027 20	Rayong	–	Port	Rayong
				Stadium: Rayong Province Stadium

13 March 2027 21	Port	–	Chiangrai United	Bangkok
				Stadium: PAT Stadium

20 March 2027 22	Chonburi	–	Port	Chonburi
				Stadium: Chonburi Stadium

4 April 2027 23	Port	–	Sisaket United	Bangkok
				Stadium: PAT Stadium

17 April 2027 24	PT Prachuap	–	Port	Prachuap
				Stadium: Sam Ao Stadium

25 April 2027 25	Port	–	Buriram United	Bangkok
				Stadium: PAT Stadium

2 May 2027 26	Ratchaburi	–	Port	Ratchaburi
				Stadium: Dragon Solar Park

8 May 2027 27	Port	–	BG Pathum United	Bangkok
				Stadium: PAT Stadium

15 May 2027 28	Port	–	Ayutthaya United	Bangkok
				Stadium: PAT Stadium

23 May 2027 29	Uthai Thani	–	Port	Uthai Thani
				Stadium: Uthai Thani Province Stadium

30 May 2027 30	Port	–	Rasisalai United	Bangkok
				Stadium: PAT Stadium

Pos	Team	Pld	W	D	L	GF	GA	GD	Pts	Qualification or relegation
1	Bangkok United	9	6	1	2	15	7	+8	19	Qualification to the 2027–28 AFC Champions League Elite League stage
2	PT Prachuap	8	6	1	1	11	4	+7	19	Qualification to the 2027–28 AFC Champions League Elite League stage
3	Port	7	5	1	1	15	8	+7	16	
4	Ayutthaya United	9	5	1	3	15	10	+5	16	
5	Buriram United	7	5	1	1	13	8	+5	16	

Updated to match(es) played on 22 November 2026. Source: Thai League 1 2026–27
Rules for classification: 1) Points; 2) Goal difference; 3) Goals scored.

=== Thai FA Cup ===
Win Draw Loss

21 October 2026 Rd of 64	Rasisalai United	1–3	Port	Ubon Ratchathani
	Kim Ji-min 16'; Thanachianchot Rojtearawanich (yellow card) 86'; Sekou Gassama (yellow card) 90+3'		Erik Sviatchenko 2'; Jude Soonsup-Bell 11', 27'	Stadium: UMT Stadium; Attendance: 819; Referee: Chaikrit Inboonsong

15-17 December 2026 Rd of 32	Port	–	Rayong	Bangkok
				Stadium: PAT Stadium

=== Thai League Cup ===
8-10 December 2026 Rd of 32	Chiangmai	–	Port	Chiangmai
				Stadium: Chiang Mai Municipality Stadium

=== AFC Champions League Elite ===
==== League stage ====
Win Draw Loss

Pos	Team	Pld	W	D	L	GF	GA	GD	Pts
11	(Vietnam) Công An Hà Nội	4	1	1	2	4	7	−3	4
12	(Thailand) Buriram United	4	0	3	1	2	3	−1	3
13	(Thailand) Port	4	1	0	3	9	14	−5	3
14	(Thailand) Ratchaburi	4	0	1	3	6	10	−4	1
15	(South Korea) Pohang Steelers	4	0	1	3	4	11	−7	1

Updated to match(es) played on 4 November 2026. Source: AFC
Rules for classification: 1) points; 2) goal difference; 3) number of goals scored; 4) number of matches won; 5) penalty shoot-out if only two teams remain tied and played each other on the final matchday 6) fair play ranking; 7) drawing of lots

15 September 2026 1	Port (Thailand)	1–2	(Japan) Vissel Kobe	Pathum Thani, Thailand
	Ren Komatsu 45+4' (o.g.); Kevin Mendes (yellow card) 66'; Suphanan Bureerat (yellow card) 77'	Report	Ren Komatsu 10'; Yoshinori Muto 61'; Caetano (yellow card) 72'; Shuichi Gonda (yellow card) 74'	Stadium: Thammasat Stadium; Attendance: 1,779; Referee: Choi Hyun-jai (South Korea)

14 October 2026 2	Kashiwa Reysol (Japan)	5–1	(Thailand) Port	Kashiwa, Japan
	Tojiro Kubo 5'; Yuki Kakita 10'; Riki Harakawa 15' (pen.); Koya Yuruki 26'; Hinata Yamauchi 28'; Yusei Yamanouchi (yellow card) 85'	Report	Manuel Bihr 64'	Stadium: Sankyo Frontier Kashiwa Stadium; Attendance: 7,993; Referee: Ammar Mahfoodh (Bahrain)

27 October 2026 3	Johor Darul Ta'zim (Malaysia)	3–0	(Thailand) Port	Johor, Malaysia
	Jonathan Silva 53'; Bergson 62' (yellow card) 64'; Stoichkov 62' (yellow card) 89'	Report	Suphanan Bureerat (yellow card) 89'	Stadium: Sultan Ibrahim Stadium; Attendance: 19,174; Referee: Alireza Faghani (Australia)

3 November 2026 4	Port (Thailand)	7–4	(China) Beijing Guoan	Pathum Thani, Thailand
	Jude Soonsup-Bell 17', 20'; Bordin Phala 29', 78', 81'; Teerasak Poeiphimai 90+1', 90+4'	Report	Chadrac Akolo 5'; Dawhan 23', 42'; Noboru Shimura 38' (o.g.); Bai Yang (yellow card) 44'; Guilherme Ramos (red card) 57'	Stadium: Pathum Thani Stadium; Attendance: 1,492; Referee: Salman Falahi (Qatar)

25 November 2026 5	Gamba Osaka (Japan)	–	(Thailand) Port	Osaka, Japan
				Stadium: Suita City Football Stadium

2 December 2026 6	Port (Thailand)	–	(Japan) Kashima Antlers	Pathum Thani, Thailand
				Stadium: Pathum Thani Stadium

9 February 2027 7	Shanghai Port (China)	–	(Thailand) Port	Shanghai, China
				Stadium: Pudong Football Stadium

16 February 2027 8	Port (Thailand)	–	(Japan) Kyoto Sanga	Pathum Thani, Thailand
				Stadium: Pathum Thani Stadium

=== ASEAN Club Championship ===
==== Group stage ====
Pos	Team	Pld	W	D	L	GF	GA	GD	Pts	Qualification	JDT	SIB	CAH	PKR	LCS	POR	SUN
1	(Malaysia) Johor Darul Ta'zim	2	2	0	0	9	1	+8	6	Advance to knockout stage	—	—	—	6–0	1 Apr	—	10 Dec
2	(Indonesia) Persib	2	2	0	0	9	1	+8	6	Advance to knockout stage	17 Dec	—	4 Mar	—	—	—	6–0
3	(Vietnam) Công An Hà Nội	2	1	0	1	2	3	−1	3	Advance to knockout stage	1–3	—	—	10 Dec	—	—	25 Feb
4	(Cambodia) PKR Svay Rieng	2	1	0	1	4	7	−3	3	Advance to knockout stage	—	25 Feb	—	—	17 Dec	4–1	—
5	(Singapore) Lion City Sailors	1	0	0	1	0	1	−1	0		—	10 Dec	0–1	—	—	25 Feb	—
6	(Thailand) Port	2	0	0	2	2	7	−5	0		4 Mar	1–3	1 Apr	—	—	—	—
7	(Myanmar) Shan United	1	0	0	1	0	6	−6	0		—	—	—	1 Apr	4 Mar	17 Dec	—

Updated to match(es) played on 19 November 2026. Source: ASEAN United
Rules for classification: Tiebreakers

8 October 2026 1	Port (Thailand)	1–3	(Indonesia) Persib	Bangkok, Thailand
	Jude Soonsup-Bell 66' (pen.) (yellow card) 69'; Manuel Bihr (yellow card) 86'; Marcel Scalese (yellow card) 90+1'	Report	Mariano Peralta 87'; Berguinho 90+2'; Luka Menalo 90+6'; Patricio Matricardi (yellow card) 41'; Gabriel Mutombo (yellow card) 44'; Adam Alis (yellow card) 56'	Stadium: PAT Stadium; Attendance: 1,729; Referee: Nazmi Nasaruddin (Malaysia); Man of the Match: (Croatia) (Bosnia and Herzegovina) Luka Menalo

19 November 2026 2	PKR Svay Rieng (Cambodia)	4–1	(Thailand) Port	Svay Rieng, Cambodia
	Min Ratanak 14' (yellow card) 46'; Martins Júnior 43'; Tiago Alves 69'; Kwame Peprah 77' (pen.)	Report	Issam Al-Subhi 90+1'; Takaki Ose (yellow card) 53'; Chaiyaphon Otton (red card) 89'	Stadium: Svay Rieng Stadium; Referee: Yusuke Ohashi (Japan)

17 December 2026 3	Shan United (Myanmar)	–	(Thailand) Port	Taunggyi, Myanmar
		Report		Stadium: Taunggyi Stadium

25 February 2027 4	Lion City Sailors (Singapore)	–	(Thailand) Port	Jalan Besar, Singapore
		Report		Stadium: Jalan Besar Stadium

4 March 2027 5	Port (Thailand)	–	(Malaysia) Johor Darul Ta'zim	Bangkok, Thailand
		Report		Stadium: PAT Stadium

1 April 2027 6	Port (Thailand)	–	(Vietnam) Công An Hà Nội	Bangkok, Thailand
		Report		Stadium: PAT Stadium

== Team statistics ==
=== Appearances and goals ===
As of 19 November 2026

No.	Pos.	Player	League		FA Cup		League Cup		AFC Champions League Elite		Shopee Cup		Total	
No.	Pos.	Player	Apps.	Goals	Apps.	Goals	Apps.	Goals	Apps.	Goals	Apps.	Goals	Apps.	Goals
1	GK	(Thailand) Somporn Yos	1	0	0	0	0	0	0	0	0	0	1	0
3	DF	(Indonesia) Asnawi Mangkualam	0	0	0	0	0	0	0	0	0	0	0	0
4	DF	(Thailand) Suphanan Bureerat	6	0	0	0	0	0	2+2	0	0	0	10	0
5	MF	(Thailand) Peeradon Chamratsamee	7	5	0	0	0	0	3+1	0	2	0	13	5
7	FW	(Oman) Essam Al-Sabhi	4+3	1	0+1	0	0	0	3	0	0+1	1	12	2
8	MF	(Thailand) Tanaboon Kesarat	0+1	0	1	0	0	0	0	0	0	0	2	0
9	FW	(Brazil) Ruan Ribeiro	0	0	1	0	0	0	1+1	0	0+1	0	4	0
10	MF	(Thailand) Bordin Phala	0+3	0	1	0	0	0	0+1	3	2	0	7	3
11	FW	(Brazil) Bruno Moreira	4+1	2	0+1	0	0	0	3	0	2	0	11	2
12	MF	(Brazil) Kaká Mendes	4	0	0	0	0	0	1	0	1	0	6	0
13	DF	(Brazil) Matheus Lins	2+1	0	0	0	0	0	1	0	1	0	5	0
14	FW	(Thailand) Teerasak Poeiphimai	3+4	3	0	0	0	0	1+2	2	0+1	0	11	5
15	DF	(Thailand) (Germany) Manuel Bihr	4+1	0	0	0	0	0	3	1	1	0	9	1
16	DF	(Thailand) Chinnawat Wongchai	0+1	0	0	0	0	0	0	0	0	0	1	0
17	MF	(Thailand) Seksan Ratree	2+1	0	0+1	0	0	0	1+2	0	0+2	0	9	0
18	FW	(Thailand) (England) Jude Soonsup-Bell	2+4	0	1	2	0	0	1+3	2	1+1	1	13	5
19	FW	(Portugal) Rui Costa	0+1	0	0	0	0	0	1	0	1	0	3	0
20	DF	(Brazil) Marcel Scalese	3+1	1	1	0	0	0	2	0	1+1	0	9	1
21	MF	(Thailand) Sivakorn Tiatrakul	0+1	0	1	0	0	0	0	0	0	0	2	0
22	MF	(Thailand) Worachit Kanitsribampen	5+2	2	0	0	0	0	1+2	0	1	0	11	2
23	MF	(Thailand) Seksan Ratree	0+2	0	0	0	0	0	0	0	0	0	2	0
24	MF	(Thailand) Jakkaphan Kaewprom	4+2	0	0	0	0	0	0+3	0	0+1	0	10	0
25	DF	(Thailand) Chaiyaphon Otton	6+1	0	0+1	0	0	0	3	0	1	0	12	0
27	FW	(Brazil) Lucas Tocantins	3+1	0	0	0	0	0	1+2	0	0	0	7	0
28	DF	(Denmark) (Ukraine) Erik Sviatchenko	0+1	0	1	1	0	0	3	0	2	0	7	1
29	FW	(Thailand) (England) Caelan Tanadon Ryan	0	0	0	0	0	0	0	0	0	0	0	0
33	MF	(Japan) Noboru Shimura	4+1	0	1	0	0	0	4	0	2	0	12	0
34	DF	(Thailand) Nitipong Selanon	1	0	1	0	0	0	0	0	2	0	4	0
36	DF	(Thailand) Peerawat Akkratum	6	0	0	0	0	0	3+1	0	0	0	10	0
38	MF	(Thailand) Natthakit Phosri	0	0	0	0	0	0	0	0	0	0	0	0
47	MF	(Thailand) Sittha Boonlha	0+1	0	0	0	0	0	1	0	0	0	2	0
77	DF	(Thailand) (France) Hugo Boutsingkham	0	0	1	0	0	0	0	0	0	0	1	0
88	MF	(Brazil) Carlos Jatobá	0	0	0+1	0	0	0	0	0	0+1	0	2	0
93	GK	(Philippines) (Denmark) Michael Falkesgaard	6	0	1	0	0	0	4	0	2	0	13	0
??	DF	(Thailand) Thiti Thumporn	0	0	0	0	0	0	0	0	0	0	0	0
Players loaned out during season
6	MF	(Thailand) Chanukun Karin	0	0	0	0	0	0	0	0	0	0	0	0
??	GK	(Thailand) Sorawat Phosaman	0	0	0	0	0	0	0	0	0	0	0	0
Players left during season
