= 2025–26 Port F.C. season =

Port
2025-26 season
- Chairman: (Thailand) Photipong Lamsam
- Manager: (Brazil) Alexandre Gama
- Stadium: PAT Stadium, Khlong Toei, Bangkok, Thailand
Home colours	Away colours	Third colours

The 2025-26 season is Port's 9th consecutive season in Thailand's top flight in Thai Football, after being promoted from Thai League 2 in 2016. This season, Port will participate in 3 competitions which consist of the Thai League, FA Cup, and League Cup.

On 25 June 2024, Thai League announced the program for the upcoming 2024-25 Thai League 1 season. The season commenced on 9 August 2024, and will conclude on 27 April 2025.

== Squad ==
As of 6 February 2025

Squad No.	Name	Nationality	Date of birth (age)	Previous club
Goalkeepers
1	Somporn Yos	(Thailand)	23 June 1993 (age 33)	(Thailand) Muangthong United
35	Sarawut Konglarp	(Thailand)	31 October 1987 (age 38)	(Thailand) Samut Sakhon City
93	Michael Falkesgaard	(Philippines) (Denmark)	9 April 1991 (age 35)	(Denmark) B.93
Defenders
3	Asnawi Mangkualam	(Indonesia)	4 October 1999 (age 26)	(South Korea) Jeonnam Dragons
4	Suphanan Bureerat	(Thailand)	10 December 1993 (age 32)	(Thailand) Samut Prakan City
13	Matheus Lins	(Brazil)	24 March 2001 (age 25)	(Moldova) FC Sheriff Tiraspol
16	Chinnawat Wongchai	(Thailand)	8 December 1996 (age 29)	(Thailand) Buriram United
17	Irfan Fandi	(Singapore) (South Africa)	13 August 1997 (age 28)	(Thailand) BG Pathum United
22	Rebin Sulaka	(Iraq) (Sweden)	12 April 1992 (age 34)	(Iraq) Erbil SC
36	Peerawat Akkratum	(Thailand)	3 December 1998 (age 27)	(Thailand) Prachuap
Midfielders
5	Peeradon Chamratsamee	(Thailand)	15 September 1992 (age 33)	(Thailand) Buriram United
6	Chanukun Karin	(Thailand)	24 April 1997 (age 29)	(Thailand) Police Tero
8	Tanaboon Kesarat (captain)	(Thailand)	21 May 1993 (age 33)	(Thailand) BG Pathum United
9	Athit Berg	(Thailand) (Norway)	11 January 1998 (age 28)	(Thailand) Buriram United
10	Bordin Phala	(Thailand)	20 December 1994 (age 31)	(Thailand) Buriram United
12	Kaká Mendes	(Brazil)	16 March 1993 (age 33)	(Saudi Arabia) Al-Jabalain
21	Sivakorn Tiatrakul	(Thailand)	7 July 1994 (age 31)	(Thailand) BG Pathum United
23	Hugo Boutsingkham	(Thailand) (France)	20 January 2003 (age 23)	(France) Nantes B
26	Chaiyawat Buran	(Thailand)	26 October 1996 (age 29)	(Thailand) Lamphun Warriors
33	Noboru Shimura	(Japan)	11 March 1993 (age 33)	(Serbia) FK Spartak Subotica
38	Natthakit Phosri	(Thailand)	8 February 2008 (age 18)	Youth team
44	Worachit Kanitsribampen	(Thailand)	24 August 1997 (age 28)	(Thailand) BG Pathum United
47	Sittha Boonlha	(Thailand)	2 September 2004 (age 21)	(Thailand) Assumption United
Forwards
7	Leonardo Kalil	(Brazil)	10 April 1996 (age 30)	(South Korea) Gyeongnam FC
14	Teerasak Poeiphimai	(Thailand)	21 September 2002 (age 23)	(Thailand) Prime Bangkok
18	Brayan Perea	(Colombia)	25 February 1993 (age 33)	(Bulgaria) POFC Botev Vratsa
27	Lucas Tocantins	(Brazil)	25 July 1994 (age 31)	(Brazil) Volta Redonda
Players loaned out
20	Phakhawat Sapso (FW)	(Thailand)	20 November 2005 (age 20)	(Thailand) Monthongwitaya School
27	Thiti Thumporn (D)	(Thailand)	27 April 1999 (age 27)	(Thailand) Nakhon Ratchasima
29	Caelan Tanadon Ryan	(Thailand) (England)	12 October 2005 (age 20)	(Thailand) Sisaket United
36	Worawut Srisupha (Vice-captain)	(Thailand)	25 May 1992 (age 34)	(Thailand) Bangkok
99	Tanasith Siripala	(Thailand)	9 August 1995 (age 30)	(Thailand) Suphanburi
	Pichitchai Sienkrthok (D)	(Thailand)	18 March 2003 (age 23)	(Thailand) Police Tero
Players left during season
7	Pakorn Prempak (Vice-captain)	(Thailand)	2 February 1993 (age 33)	(Thailand) Police Tero
11	Matheus Pato	(Brazil)	8 June 1995 (age 31)	(Indonesia) Borneo
19	Chayapipat Supunpasuch	(Thailand)	25 February 2001 (age 25)	(Portugal) S.C. Praiense
23	Kevin Deeromram	(Thailand) (Sweden)	11 September 1997 (age 28)	(Thailand) Ratchaburi
24	Worawut Namvech	(Thailand)	4 July 1995 (age 30)	(Thailand) Ratchaburi
31	Sumethee Khokpho	(Thailand) (Germany)	5 November 1998 (age 27)	(Thailand) Trat

== Transfer ==
=== In ===
Pre-Season

Date	Position	Player	Transferred from	Fee	Ref
First team
1 June 2025	GK	(Thailand) Chanin Sae-ear	(Thailand) Pattaya United	Loan Return	
1 June 2025	GK	(Thailand) Sumethee Khokpho	(Thailand) Trat	Loan Return	
1 June 2025	DF	(England) Charlie Clough	(Thailand) Sisaket United	Loan Return	
1 June 2025	DF	(Thailand) Worawut Namvech	(Thailand) Ratchaburi	Loan Return	
1 June 2025	DF	(Thailand) Nakin Wisetchat	(Thailand) Nakhon Pathom United	Loan Return	
9 June 2025	FW	(Thailand) (England) Caelan Tanadon Ryan	(Thailand) Buriram United	Free	2 years contract till June 2027
24 June 2025	DF	(Thailand) Peerawat Akkratum	(Thailand) Prachuap	Free	
1 July 2025	GK	(Philippines) (Denmark) Michael Falkesgaard	(Denmark) B.93	Free	
2 July 2025	DF	(Iraq) Rebin Sulaka	(Iraq) Erbil SC	Free	
2 July 2025	DF	(Brazil) Matheus Lins	(Moldova) FC Sheriff Tiraspol	Undisclosed	
2 July 2025	FW	(Brazil) Matheus Pato	(Indonesia) Borneo	Free	
2 July 2025	FW	(Colombia) Brayan Perea	(Bulgaria) POFC Botev Vratsa	Free	
10 July 2025	MF	(Brazil) Kaká Mendes	(Saudi Arabia) Al-Jabalain	Undisclosed	
30 July 2025	FW	(Brazil) Lucas Tocantins	(Brazil) Volta Redonda	Undisclosed	
16 August 2025	FW	(Thailand) (France) Hugo Boutsingkham	(France) Nantes B	Free	
Academy
1 June 2025	GK	(Thailand) (Australia) James Owen Shanahan	(Thailand) Phrae United	Loan Return	
1 June 2025	MF	(Thailand) Sirawut Kengnok	(Thailand) Police Tero	Loan Return	
1 June 2025	MF	(Thailand) Apidet Janngam	(Thailand) Police Tero	Loan Return	
1 June 2025	FW	(Thailand) Phodchara Chainarong	(Thailand) Ayutthaya United	Loan Return	
6 August 2025	DF	(Thailand) Pichitchai Sienkrthok	(Thailand) Police Tero	Undisclosed	(Note: Pichitchai Sienkrthok signed and loaned back to Police for 1 season.)

Mid-season

Date	Position	Player	Transferred To	Fee	Ref
First team
25 November 2025	FW	(Thailand) (Norway) Athit Berg	(Thailand) Buriram United	Season loan	
19 December 2025	MF	(Thailand) Sivakorn Tiatrakul	(Thailand) BG Pathum United	Free	
19 December 2025	DF	(Thailand) Pichitchai Sienkrthok	(Thailand) Police Tero	Loan for Leg 1	
2 January 2026	FW	(Brazil) Leonardo Kalil	(South Korea) Gyeongnam FC	Free	
Academy

Post-season transfer

Date	Position	Player	Transferred from	Fee	Ref
First team
2026	DF	(Thailand) Chaiyaphon Otton	(Thailand) Sukhothai	Free	
2026	DF	(Thailand) (Germany) Manuel Bihr	(Thailand) Bangkok United	Free	

=== Out ===
Pre-Season

Date	Position	Player	Transferred To	Fee	Ref
First team
31 May 2025	MF	(Thailand) Anon Amornlerdsak	(Thailand) Bangkok United	End of loan	
1 June 2025	DF	(Thailand) Chalermsak Aukkee	(Thailand) Burapha United	Free	
1 June 2025	DF	(England) Charlie Clough	(Thailand) Lamphun Warriors	Free	
1 June 2025	DF	(Ghana) Isaac Honny	(Thailand) Police Tero	Free	
1 June 2025	DF	(Iraq) (Denmark) Frans Putros	(Indonesia) Persib Bandung	Free	
1 June 2025	MF	(Thailand) Pathompol Charoenrattanapirom	(Thailand) Buriram United	Free	
1 June 2025	FW	(Guinea) Lonsana Doumbouya		Free	
1 June 2025	FW	(Brazil) Felipe Amorim	(Thailand) Khon Kaen United	Free	
1 June 2025	FW	(Brazil) Barros Tardeli		Free	
1 June 2025	FW	(Togo) (Germany) Peniel Mlapa	(Thailand) Lamphun Warriors	Free	
18 June 2025	GK	(Thailand) Worawut Srisupha	(Thailand) Rayong	Season loan	
1 July 2025	GK	(Thailand) (Australia) James Owen Shanahan	(Thailand)	Free	
1 July 2025	MF	(Thailand) Nakin Wisetchat	(Thailand) Customs United	Free	
18 July 2025	DF	(Thailand) Thiti Thumporn	(Thailand) Sukhothai	Free	
27 July 2025	DF	(Thailand) (Sweden) Kevin Deeromram	(Malaysia) Selangor	Free	
3 September 2025	GK	(Thailand) Chanin Sae-ear	(Thailand) Chumphon United	Free	
Academy
6 July 2025	MF	(Thailand) Sirawut Kengnok	(Thailand) Trat	Season Loan	
28 July 2025	MF	(Thailand) Tanasith Siripala	(Thailand) Kanchanaburi Power	Season Loan	
29 July 2025	FW	(Thailand) Thanakrit Phonthongthin	(Thailand) Nakhon Pathom United (T2)	Season Loan	
6 August 2025	DF	(Thailand) Pichitchai Sienkrthok	(Thailand) Police Tero	Loan for Leg 1	
31 August 2025	FW	(Thailand) Phakhawat Sapso	(Thailand) Thonburi	Season Loan	
31 August 2025	FW	(Thailand) Phuthanet Somjit	(Thailand) Navy	Season Loan	

Mid-season

Date	Position	Player	Transferred To	Fee	Ref
First team
15 December 2025	MF	(Thailand) Pakorn Prempak	(Thailand) Police Tero	Free	
16 December 2025	MF	(Thailand) Worawut Namvech	(Thailand) Ayutthaya United	Free	
20 December 2025	DF	(Thailand) Pichitchai Sienkrthok	(Thailand) Nakhon Ratchasima	Loan for Leg 2	
29 December 2025	GK	(Thailand) (Germany) Sumethee Khokpho	(Thailand) Kanchanaburi Power	Free	
29 December 2025	MF	(Thailand) Chayapipat Supunpasuch	(Thailand) Kanchanaburi Power	Free	
6 January 2026	FW	(Brazil) Matheus Pato	(Thailand)	Free	
12 January 2026	FW	(Thailand) (England) Caelan Tanadon Ryan	(Thailand) Police Tero	Season loan	
Academy

Postseason

Date	Position	Player	Transferred To	Fee	Ref
First team
2 January 2026	FW	(Brazil) Leonardo Kalil	(South Korea) Gyeongnam FC	Free	
Academy

== Pre-season and friendlies ==
President Cup

6 July 2025 1	Persib Bandung (Indonesia)	0–2	(Thailand) Port FC	Pasundan, Indonesia
		Report	Bordin Phala 45'; Peeradol Chamrasamee 68'	Stadium: Si Jalak Harupat Stadium; Referee: Firdavs Norsafarov (Uzbekistan)

9 July 2025 2	Dewa United (Indonesia)	1–2	(Thailand) Port FC	Pasundan, Indonesia
	Stefano Lilipaly 10'		Matheus Pato 45'; Irfan Fandi 90+4'	Stadium: Si Jalak Harupat Stadium; Attendance: 4,573; Referee: Razlan Joffri Ali (Malaysia)

13 July 2025 Final	Oxford United (England)	1–2	(Thailand) Port FC	Pasundan, Indonesia
	Mark Harris 11'		Teerasak Poeiphimai 44'; Brayan Perea 48'	Stadium: Si Jalak Harupat Stadium; Attendance: 15,358; Referee: Firdavs Norsafarov (Uzbekistan)

Others

29 July 2025 1	Port FC (Thailand)	5–1	(Thailand) Chanthaburi FC	Bangkok
	Brayan Perea 3', 21', 35'; Peeradol Chamrasamee 45+1'; Matheus Pato 68'		David Rowley 74'	Stadium: PAT Stadium

2 August 2025 2	Pattani FC (Thailand)	0–3	(Thailand) Port FC	Pattani
			Brayan Perea 49'; Matheus Pato 58' (pen.), 72'	Stadium: Pattani Province Stadium

8 August 2025 3	Port FC (Thailand)	10–0	(Thailand) Singburi	Bangkok
	Brayan Perea 1', 28'; Matheus Pato 11'; Rebin Sulaka 20'; Kaka Mendes 29'; Pakorn Parmpak 69'; Teerasak Poeiphimai 74'; Chaiyawat Buran 86', 104'; Caelan Ryan 91'			Stadium: PAT Stadium

5 February 2026 4	Port FC (Thailand)	1–0	(China) Shenzhen Peng City	Bangkok
				Stadium: PAT Stadium

== Competitions ==
=== Thai League 1 ===
==== Matches ====
Win Draw Loss

17 August 2025 1	Port	3–1	Ayutthaya United	Bangkok
	Wellington Priori 9' (o.g.); Teerasak Poeiphimai 14'; Lucas Tocantins 29'; Noboru Shimura (yellow card) 60'		Diego Carioca 84'; Wattanakorn Sawatlakhorn (yellow card) 6'; Caique (yellow card) 36'; Hwang Hyun-soo (yellow card) 89'; Néstor Albiach (yellow card) 90+2'	Stadium: PAT Stadium; Attendance: 6,250; Referee: Songkran Bunmeekiart

24 August 2025 2	Sukhothai	1–0	Port	Sukhothai
	Baggio Rakotonomenjanahary 46'			Stadium: Thalay Luang Stadium; Attendance: 3,375; Referee: Mongkolchai Pechsri

30 August 2025 3	Port	1–1	Rayong	Bangkok
	Noboru Shimura 50'; Chaiyawat Buran (yellow card) 41'; Kaká Mendes (red card) 71'; Peeradol Chamrasamee (yellow card) 85'		Supawit Romphopak 80'; Stênio Júnior (yellow card) 18'	Stadium: PAT Stadium; Attendance: 4,854; Referee: Satchukorn Saenchu

13 September 2025 4	Ratchaburi	1–0	Port	Ratchaburi
	Denílson 26'			Stadium: Ratchaburi Stadium; Attendance: 5,842; Referee: Torphong Somsing

19 September 2025 5	Port	3–0	Chonburi	Bangkok
	Chanukun Karin 3'; Brayan Perea 25'; Peeradol Chamrasamee 55'; Chayapipat Supunpasuch (yellow card) 90+5'		Nattanan Biesamrit (yellow card) 43'	Stadium: PAT Stadium; Attendance: 5,166; Referee: Mongkolchai Pechsri

28 September 2025 6	BG Pathum United	2–2	Port	Pathum Thani
	Surachart Sareepim 45+2', 58' (yellow card) 29'; Waris Choolthong (yellow card) 32'; Nika Sandokhadze (yellow card) 90+2'		Asnawi Mangkualam (yellow card) 19'; Brayan Perea (penalty missed) 33; Rebin Sulaka (yellow card) 43'; Kaká Mendes (yellow card) 60'; Teerasak Poeiphimai (yellow card) 75'	Stadium: True BG Stadium; Attendance: 11,158; Referee: Sivakorn Pu-udom

4 October 2025 7	Port	8–0	Kanchanaburi Power	Bangkok
	Lucas Tocantins 10'; Suphanan Bureerat 45'; Peeradol Chamrasamee 62', 66' (yellow card) 16'; Matheus Pato 75', 83'; Teerasak Poeiphimai 79', 83'; Noboru Shimura (yellow card) 36'; Pakorn Prempak (yellow card) 89'		Gerson Rodrigues (red card) 22'	Stadium: PAT Stadium; Attendance: 4,853; Referee: Songkran Bunmeekiart

18 October 2025 8	Nakhon Ratchasima	0–2	Port	Nakhon Ratchasima
	Suphanan Bureerat 51'; Brayan Perea 57'; Teerasak Poeiphimai (yellow card) 51'; Worachit Kanitsribampen (yellow card) 67'		Nenad Lalić (yellow card) 31'; Dejan Meleg (yellow card) 41'; Hirotaka Mita (yellow card) 67'	Stadium: 80th Birthday Stadium; Attendance: 3,815; Referee: Warintorn Sassadee

24 October 2025 9	Port	1–0	Muangthong United	Bangkok
	Lucas Tocantins 79'; Noboru Shimura (yellow card) 83'		Nelson Orji (yellow card) 39'; Kenan Dünnwald-Turan (yellow card) 48'	Stadium: PAT Stadium; Attendance: 6,250; Referee: Mongkolchai Pechsri

2 November 2025 10	Lamphun Warriors	0–2	Port	Lamphun
	Nuttee Noiwilai (yellow card) 56'; Maung Maung Lwin (yellow card) 58'; Noppol Kerdkaew (yellow card) 81'		Peeradol Chamrasamee 82'; Teerasak Poeiphimai 90+2' (yellow card) 52'; Chanukan Karin (yellow card) 88'	Stadium: Lamphun Province Stadium; Attendance: 2,298; Referee: Songkran Bunmeekiart

9 November 2025 11	Port	0–0	Bangkok United	Bangkok
	Suphanan Bureerat (yellow card) 35'; Kaká Mendes (yellow card) 43'; Teerasak Poeiphimai (yellow card) 68'; Chaiyawat Buran (yellow card) 90'		Pokklaw A-nan (yellow card) 31'	Stadium: PAT Stadium; Attendance: 5,711; Referee: Sivakorn Pu-Udom

22 November 2025 12	Port	1–1	Chiangrai United	Bangkok
	Kaká Mendes 17'; Peeradol Chamrasamee (yellow card) 45+5' (penalty missed) 45+2; Gionata Verzura (yellow card) 82'		Settasit Suvannaseat (yellow card) 29'; Itsuki Enomoto 65' (pen.) (yellow card) 69'; Heilo (yellow card) 67'	Stadium: PAT Stadium; Attendance: 4,297; Referee: Warintorn Sassadee

28 November 2025 13	PT Prachuap	0–1	Port	Prachuap Khiri Khan
	Jirapan Phasukihan (yellow card) 63'; Bernardo Vilar (yellow card) 77'; Edgar Méndez (yellow card) 82'; Wanchat Choosong (yellow card) 84'		Kaká Mendes 32'; Teerasak Poeiphimai (yellow card) 45'; Peerawat Akkratum (yellow card) 62'; Noboru Shimura (yellow card) 90+8'	Stadium: Sam Ao Stadium; Attendance: 3,549; Referee: Wiwat Jumpaoon

7 December 2025 14	Port	3–1	Uthai Thani	Bangkok
	Peeradol Chamrasamee 24'; Kaká Mendes 76'; Lucas Tocantins 83' (yellow card) 25'; Chanukan Karin (yellow card) 88'		William Weidersjö 74'; Bruno Baio (yellow card) 30'; Marcelo Djaló (yellow card) 66'	Stadium: PAT Stadium; Attendance: 4,081; Referee: Songkran Bunmeekiart

14 December 2025 15	Buriram United	1–0	Port	Buriram
	Goran Čaušić 90+1'; Theerathon Bunmathan (yellow card) 14'; Kenneth Dougall (yellow card) 16'; Pansa Hemviboon (yellow card) 87'; Robert Žulj (yellow card) 90+8'; Peter Žulj (yellow card) 90+9'; Sasalak Haiprakhon (yellow card) 90+11'		Peeradol Chamrasamee (yellow card) 56'; Chanukun Karin (red card) 73'; Michael Falkesgaard (yellow card) 85'; Asnawi Mangkualam (yellow card) 87' (yellow-red card) 90+6'	Stadium: Chang Arena; Attendance: 17,151; Referee: Torphong Somsing

10 January 2026 16	Port	5–0	Sukhothai	Bangkok
	Kaká Mendes 10'; Noboru Shimura 17'; Teerasak Poeiphimai 21'; Brayan Perea 85' (pen.); Leonardo Kalil 90+5' (pen.); Lucas Tocantins (yellow card) 19'		Romeu (yellow card) 89'	Stadium: PAT Stadium; Attendance: 3,853; Referee: Warintron Sassadee

18 January 2026 17	Rayong	5–2	Port	Rayong
	João Afonso 30'; Seksan Ratree 32'; Stênio Junior 34', 42' (pen.); Thanphisit Hempandan 90+6'; Saharat Sontisawat (yellow card) 35'		Suphanan Bureerat 6'; Noboru Shimura 17'; Worachit Kanitsribumphen (yellow card) 35'; Asnawi Mangkualam (red card) 38'; Peerawat Akkratum (yellow card) 83'; Irfan Fandi (yellow card) 90'	Stadium: Rayong Province Stadium; Attendance: 3,712; Referee: Chaikrit Inboonsong

24 January 2026 18 (Rescheduled)	Port	2–1	Ratchaburi	Bangkok
	Kaká Mendes 1'; Brayan Perea 33'; Michael Falkesgaard (yellow card) 21'; Teerasak Poeiphimai (yellow card) 25'		Gleyson 52'; Daniel Ting (yellow card) 9'; Kritsanon Srisuwan (yellow card) 35'; Jesse Curran (yellow card) 53'; Siwakorn Jakkuprasat (yellow card) 90+5'	Stadium: PAT Stadium; Attendance: 5,088; Referee: Songkran Bunmeekiart

31 January 2026 19	Chonburi	3–2	Port	Chonburi
	Oege Sietse van Lingen 23'; Yotsakon Burapha 53'; Jorge Fellipe 90+6'; Kittipong Sansanit (yellow card) 45+4'; Jorge Fellipe (yellow card) 56'		Teerasak Poeiphimai 9'; Worachit Kanitsribampen 42'; Sittha Boonlha (yellow card) 45+3'; Rebin Sulaka (yellow card) 65'; Suphanan Bureerat (yellow card) 82'; Peeradol Chamratsamee (yellow card) 88'	Stadium: Chonburi Stadium; Attendance: 6,828; Referee: Jirawit Phonkaew

19 April 2026 20 (Rescheduled)	Port	0–0	BG Pathum United	Bangkok
				Stadium: PAT Stadium; Attendance: 6,250; Referee: Wiwat Jumpaoon

14 February 2026 21	Kanchanaburi Power	1–4	Port	Kanchanaburi
	Aboubakar Kamara 77'; Chayapipat Supunpasuch (yellow card) 58'; Peerapat Notchaiya (yellow card) 78'		Kaká Mendes 36'; Teerasak Poeiphimai 40' (yellow card) 43'; Leonardo Kalil 54'; Peeradol Chamratsamee 82'	Stadium: Kanchanaburi Province Stadium; Attendance: 4,965; Referee: Warintorn Sassadee

21 February 2026 22	Port	2–0	Nakhon Ratchasima	Bangkok
	Leonardo Kalil 13' (pen.); Brayan Perea 82'; Peeradol Chamratsamee (yellow card) 45+7'		Yuki Kusano (penalty missed) 45+6 (yellow card) 28'; Hirotaka Mita (yellow card) 45+6'	Stadium: PAT Stadium; Attendance: 4,283; Referee: Noppadet Mangngam

1 March 2026 23	Muangthong United	0–0	Port	Nonthaburi
	Wattanakorn Sawatlakhorn (yellow card) 22'; Tristan Do (yellow card) 58'; Kakana Khamyok (yellow card) 22'; Willian Popp (yellow card) 90+2'		Teerasak Poeiphimai (yellow card) 45'; Peerawat Akkratum (yellow card) 82'	Stadium: Thunderdome Stadium; Attendance: 6,781; Referee: Wiwat Jumpaoon

6 March 2026 24	Port	3–0	Lamphun Warriors	Bangkok
	Worachit Kanitsribampen 4'; Bordin Phala 11'; Brayan Perea 23'; Peerawat Akkratum (yellow card) 44'; Sivakorn Tiatrakul (yellow card) 46'		Anun Yodsangwal (yellow card) 90+3'	Stadium: PAT Stadium; Attendance: 3,631; Referee: Phairot Bunkamnoed

15 March 2026 25	Bangkok United	1–1	Port	Pathum Thani
	Rivaldinho 45+4'; Everton (yellow card) 47'; Wanchai Jarunongkran (yellow card) 60'; Patiwat Khammai (red card) 67'		Matheus Lins 90+4'; Suphanan Bureerat (yellow card) 71'; Irfan Fandi (yellow card) 86'	Stadium: True BG Stadium; Attendance: 2,292; Referee: Warintorn Sassadee

22 March 2026 26	Chiangrai United	1–2	Port	Chiangrai
	Dudu Silva 90+1'		Kaká Mendes 8'; Worachit Kanitsribampen 70' (yellow card) 45+2'; Michael Falkesgaard (yellow card) 65'; Matheus Lins (yellow card) 90+4'	Stadium: Singha Chiangrai Stadium; Attendance: 5,376; Referee: Songkran Bunmeekiart

4 April 2026 27	Port	3–0	PT Prachuap	Bangkok
	Noboru Shimura 28'; Suphanan Bureerat 31'; Peeradol Chamratsamee 77' (yellow card) 90+6'		Jirapan Phasukihan (yellow card) 61'	Stadium: PAT Stadium; Attendance: 4,137; Referee: Mongkolchai Pechsri

25 April 2026 28	Uthai Thani	0–1	Port	Uthai Thani
	Airfan Doloh (yellow card) 36'; Danai Smart (yellow card) 42'		Lucas Tocantins 56'; Peerawat Akkratum (yellow card) 52'; Rebin Sulaka (yellow card) 86'; Matheus Lins (yellow card) 88'	Stadium: Uthai Thani Province Stadium; Attendance: 2,722; Referee: Warintorn Sassadee

2 May 2026 29 (Rescheduled)	Port	3–1	Buriram United	Bangkok
	Worachit Kanitsribampen 4'; Leonardo Kalil 22'; Lucas Tocantins 45+2'; Noboru Shimura (yellow card) 38'		Peter Žulj 90+5'; Sandy Walsh (yellow card) 18'; Shinnaphat Leeaoh (yellow card) 50'	Stadium: PAT Stadium; Referee: Torphong Somsing

10 May 2026 30	Ayutthaya United	1–4	Port	Ayutthaya
	Yashir Islame 49'; Nattapon Worasut (yellow card) 35'		Kaka Mendes 7'; Lucas Tocantins 62'; Leonardo Kalil 67' (pen.); Suphanan Bureerat 75'; Peeradol Chamratsamee (yellow card) 38'	Stadium: Ayutthaya Province Stadium; Referee: Chaireag Ngamsom

Pos	Team	Pld	W	D	L	GF	GA	GD	Pts	Qualification or relegation
1	Buriram United (C)	30	22	4	4	76	31	+45	70	Qualification to the AFC Champions League Elite League stage and ASEAN Club Championship group stage
2	Port	30	18	6	6	59	23	+36	60	Qualification to the AFC Champions League Elite League stage and ASEAN Club Championship group stage
3	Ratchaburi	30	18	5	7	55	30	+25	59	Qualification to the AFC Champions League Elite League stage and ASEAN Club Championship group stage
4	BG Pathum United	30	14	10	6	45	29	+16	52	Qualification for AFC Champions League Two group stage
5	Bangkok United	30	13	11	6	43	32	+11	50	

Source: Thai League 1 2025–26
Rules for classification: 1) Points; 2) Goal difference; 3) Goals scored.
(C) Champions

=== Thai FA Cup ===
Win Draw Loss

29 October 2025 Rd 2	(T3) Burapha United	0–4	Port	Chonburi
	Tawan Chanthasen (yellow card) 45'; Chalermsak Aukkee (yellow card) 75'; Apiwich Laorkhai (yellow card) 78'; Pittawat Nudod (yellow card) 90+5'		Suphanan Bureerat 7', 48'; Teerasak Poeiphimai 20' (yellow card) 53'; Chanukun Karin 70'; Tanaboon Kesarat (yellow card) 31'; Kaka Mendes (yellow card) 35'; Chaiyawat Buran (yellow card) 85'	Stadium: Banbueng Municipal Stadium; Attendance: 1,256; Referee: Phairot Bunkamnoed

21 December 2025 Rd of 32	Port	0–3; Awarded (Note: The match, originally won 2–0 by Port, was forfeited and awarded 3–0 to Bangkok United by the Thai League Disciplinary Committee, as Port fielded more than the allowed number of foreigners)	Bangkok United	Bangkok
	Peeradol Chamratsamee 20'; Teerasak Poeiphimai 42' (yellow card) 72'; Peerawat Akkratum (yellow card) 35'; Chaiyawat Buran (yellow card) 79'; Rebin Sulaka (yellow card) 82'; Brayan Perea (yellow card) 85'		Kaka Mendes (yellow card) 35'; Thitipan Puangchan (yellow card) 65'; Wanchai Jarunongkran (yellow card) 85'	Stadium: PAT Stadium; Attendance: 3,092; Referee: Peerasan Krataithong

=== Thai League Cup ===
28 December 2025 Rd of 32	Chainat Hornbill (T2)	0–5	Port	Chainat
	Jain Jeong (yellow card) 38'; Warakorn Thongbai (yellow card) 57'		Suphanan Bureerat 17'; Teerasak Poeiphimai 40'; Lucas Silva 57'; Brayan Perea 67'; Sivakorn Tiatrakul 79'; Irfan Fandi (yellow card) 77'	Stadium: Khao Plong Stadium; Attendance: 1,562; Referee: Panumas Phansamo

28 January 2026 Rd of 16	Port	2–1	Ayutthaya United (T1)	Bangkok
	Brayan Perea 30'; Matheus Lins 40'; Athit Berg (yellow card) 17'		Kritsana Kasemkulvilai 75'; Bhumchanok Kamkla (yellow card) 44'; Worawut Namvech (yellow card) 45+4'; Chiraphong Raksongkham (yellow card) 60'	Stadium: PAT Stadium; Attendance: 2,389; Referee: Peerasan Krataithong

18 March 2026 Quarter Final	Port	7–0	Khon Kaen United (T2)	Bangkok
	Teerasak Poeiphimai 29', 36', 76', 90'; Worachit Kanitsribumphen 54', 90+2'; Peeradol Chamratsamee 65'			Stadium: PAT Stadium; Attendance: 1,818; Referee: Chaikrit Inboonsong

8 April 2026 Semi Final	Chonburi (T1)	3–4	Port	Ayutthaya
	Jonathan Bolingi 29' (pen.) (yellow card) 31'; Queven 36'; Yotsakorn Burapha 90+8'; Queven Inácio (yellow card) 2'; Kike Linares (yellow card) 45'; Nattapong Sayriya (yellow card) 83'		Chaiyawat Buran 11'; Matheus Lins 55'; Brayan Perea 67', 75'; Noboru Shimura (yellow card) 44'; Teerasak Poeiphimai (yellow card) 62'	Stadium: Ayutthaya Province Stadium; Attendance: 2,906; Referee: Sivakorn Pu-udom

24 May 2026 Final	BG Pathum United (T1)	0–1	Port	Pathum Thani
	Gakuto Notsuda (yellow card) 54'		Lucas Tocantins 29'; Peeradol Chamratsamee (yellow card) 45'; Sivakorn Tiatrakul (yellow card) 51'; Brayan Perea (yellow card) 82'; Matheus Lins (yellow card) 85'; Rebin Sulaka (yellow card) 90+6'	Stadium: Thammasat Stadium; Referee: Torphong Somsing

== Team statistics ==
=== Appearances and goals ===
As of 24 May 2026

No.	Pos.	Player	League		FA Cup		League Cup		Total	
No.	Pos.	Player	Apps.	Goals	Apps.	Goals	Apps.	Goals	Apps.	Goals
1	GK	(Thailand) Somporn Yos	0	0	1	0	1	0	2	0
3	DF	(Indonesia) Asnawi Mangkualam	14+2	0	1	0	0	0	17	0
4	DF	(Thailand) Suphanan Bureerat	30	5	2	2	4	1	36	8
5	MF	(Thailand) Peeradon Chamratsamee	27	7	1	0	2	1	30	8
6	MF	(Thailand) Chanukun Karin	2+14	1	0+1	1	0+1	0	18	2
7	FW	(Brazil) Leonardo Kalil	3+11	5	0	0	0	0	14	5
8	MF	(Thailand) Tanaboon Kesarat	7+14	0	1+1	0	1+2	0	26	0
9	FW	(Thailand) (Norway) Athit Berg	0+1	0	0+1	0	1+2	0	5	0
10	MF	(Thailand) Bordin Phala	8+6	1	0	0	3+1	0	18	1
12	MF	(Brazil) Kaká Mendes	27	8	2	0	2	0	31	8
13	DF	(Brazil) Matheus Lins	21+6	1	1+1	0	2	1	31	2
14	FW	(Thailand) Teerasak Poeiphimai	18+9	7	2	1	3	5	32	13
16	DF	(Thailand) Chinnawat Wongchai	1+3	0	0+1	0	1+1	0	7	0
17	DF	(Singapore) (South Africa) Irfan Fandi	4+9	0	0	0	2	0	15	0
18	FW	(Colombia) Brayan Perea	17+4	6	1+1	0	2+2	2	27	8
20	FW	(Thailand) Phakhawat Sapso	0	0	0	0	0	0	0	0
21	MF	(Thailand) Sivakorn Tiatrakul	2+4	0	0	0	1+2	1	9	1
22	DF	(Iraq) Rebin Sulaka	22+2	0	1	0	2	0	27	0
23	DF	(Thailand) (France) Hugo Boutsingkham	1+3	0	0	0	0+1	0	5	0
26	MF	(Thailand) Chaiyawat Buran	6+8	0	1+1	0	2+1	0	19	0
27	FW	(Brazil) Lucas Tocantins	14+11	7	1	0	4	1	30	8
33	MF	(Japan) Noboru Shimura	26	4	1	0	3	0	30	4
36	DF	(Thailand) Peerawat Akkratum	23	0	2	0	3	0	28	0
38	MF	(Thailand) Natthakit Phosri	0+4	0	0+1	0	0	0	5	0
44	MF	(Thailand) Worachit Kanitsribampen	21+9	4	1	0	1+1	2	33	6
47	MF	(Thailand) Sittha Boonlha	4+4	0	1	0	2	0	11	0
93	GK	(Philippines) (Denmark) Michael Falkesgaard	30	0	1	0	3	0	34	0
Players loaned out during season
27	DF	(Thailand) Thiti Thumporn	0	0	0	0	0	0	0	0
29	FW	(Thailand) (England) Caelan Tanadon Ryan	0	0	0+1	0	0	0	1	0
36	GK	(Thailand) Worawut Srisupha	0	0	0	0	0	0	0	0
99	MF	(Thailand) Tanasith Siripala	0	0	0	0	0	0	0	0
Players left during season
7	MF	(Thailand) Pakorn Prempak	0+5	0	1	0	0	0	6	0
11	FW	(Brazil) Matheus Pato	2+8	2	0	0	0	0	10	2
19	MF	(Thailand) Chayapipat Supunpasuch	0+3	0	0+1	0	0	0	4	0
23	DF	(Thailand) Kevin Deeromram	0	0	0	0	0	0	0	0
24	DF	(Thailand) Worawut Namvech	0	0	0	0	0	0	0	0
31	GK	(Thailand) Sumethee Khokpho	0	0	0	0	0	0	0	0
