= Sucupira River =

- Location within Brazil
- Native name: Rio Sucupira (Portuguese)

Location
- Country: Brazil

Physical characteristics
- Source
  - location: São Geraldo do Araguaia, Pará, Brazil
- Mouth
  - coordinates: 6.299815°S 48.420024°W

Basin features
- River system: Araguaia River

The Sucupira River (Portuguese: Rio Sucupira) is a river in the state of Pará, Brazil. It is a left tributary of the Araguaia River.

The Sucupira River rises in the Serra das Andorinhas within the 24,897 hectares (61,520 acres) Serra dos Martírios/Andorinhas State Park, created in 1996. It flows southeast through the center of the park and the São Geraldo do Araguaia Environmental Protection Area to join the Araguaia from the left.

== See also ==
- List of rivers of Pará
