= Leptodactylus pustulatus =

Conservation status
- Least Concern (IUCN 3.1)

Scientific classification
- Kingdom: Animalia
- Phylum: Chordata
- Class: Amphibia
- Order: Anura
- Family: Leptodactylidae
- Genus: Leptodactylus
- Species: L. pustulatus

Binomial name
- Leptodactylus pustulatus (Peters, 1870)

Species of frog

Leptodactylus pustulatus is a species of frog in the family Leptodactylidae. It is endemic to Brazil.

== Habitat ==
It is found in the Amazonia, Caatinga, and Cerrado biomes, in ponds, rivers, and gallery forest. It has also been found in pastureland, rural gardens, urban areas, and ponds in the states of Goiás, Mato Grosso, Tocantins, Ceará and Maranhão. It has been observed between 400 and 1,000 m (1,310 and 3,280 ft) above sea level. It has shown some tolerance to habitat disturbance. Much of its habitat consists of seasonally flooded areas in the Araguaia, Tocantins, Xingu and Parnaíba river systems.

Scientists have reported the frog in many protected places: APA da Serra de Baturite, APA de Upaon-Acu/Miritiba/Alto Preguicas, APA Lago de Palmas, APA Lago de Santa Isabel, APA Serra da Ibiapaba, and RESEX Lago do Cedro.

== Reproduction ==
The female frog seems to provide some level of parental care for the tadpoles by carrying them to water.

== Description ==
The adult Leptodactylus pustulatus is about 5 cm (2 in) long. It can easily be distinguished from other members of its genus by its distinctive ventral colouration which consists of large, red to yellow spots on a dark-coloured background. Its calls, which are heard at night, are also distinctive; the male's advertisement call consists of two notes, repeated at a rate of about twenty-six calls per minute and other males respond to these in a similarly characteristic fashion.

== Biology ==
Breeding takes place around October in flooded grassland and flooded gallery forest habitats. Males call from still-water sites such as at the edges of ponds, often from near aquatic vegetation or fallen trees. Cattle dams are also used as breeding sites. Tadpoles have been found in large accumulations, sometimes swimming around a female floating in the water. On several occasions, a female was observed to "gather" tadpoles around her and move the group to a new location; the adult seems to have been providing some level of parental care. Both tadpoles and adults are at risk from predators such as wolf fish (Hoplias spp.) and the brown-banded water snake (Helicops angulatus).

== Status ==
L. pustulatus is a common species; it has a wide range and large total population which is believed to be stable, and no particular threats have been identified. The International Union for Conservation of Nature has assessed its conservation status as being of "least concern" of extinction.
