= Ananás, Tocantins =

Municipality in Tocantins, Brazil

Ananás
- Municipality
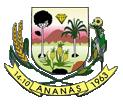
- Flag Coat of arms

- Location in Tocantins state

- Location in Brazil
- Coordinates: 6°21′57″S 48°4′22″W
- Country: Brazil
- Region: North
- State: Tocantins

Area
  - Total: 1,577 km^{2} (609 sq mi)

Population (2020)
  - Total: 9,492
  - Density: 6.019/km^{2} (15.59/sq mi)
- Time zone: UTC−3 (BRT)

Ananás is a municipality located in the Brazilian state of Tocantins. Its population was 9,492 (2020) and its area is 1,577 km^{2}.

The municipality contains 52% of the 18,608-hectare (45,980-acre) Lago de Santa Isabel Environmental Protection Area, created in 2002.

== See also ==
- List of municipalities in Tocantins
