= Riachinho, Tocantins =

Municipality in Tocantins, Brazil

Riachinho
- Municipality
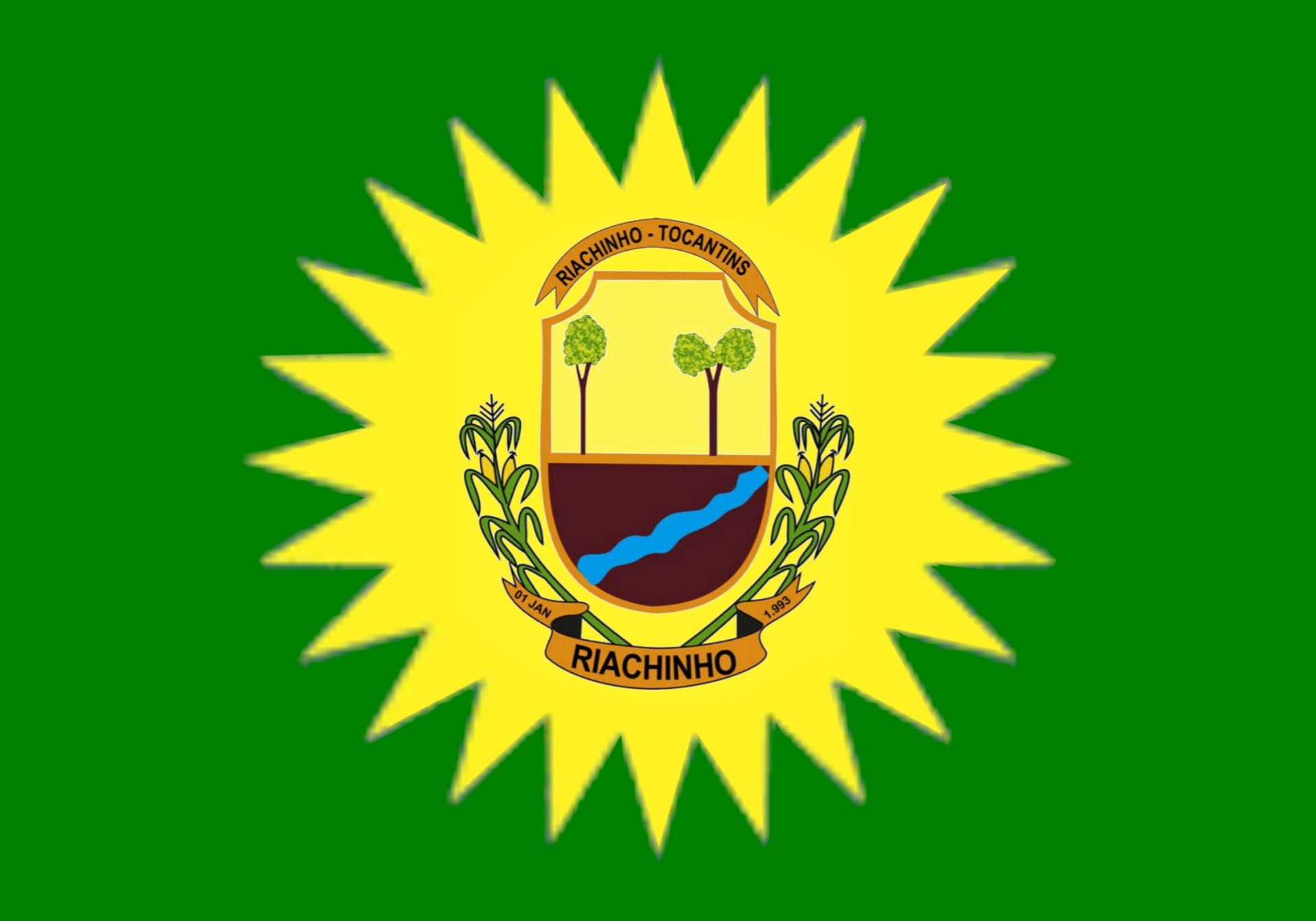
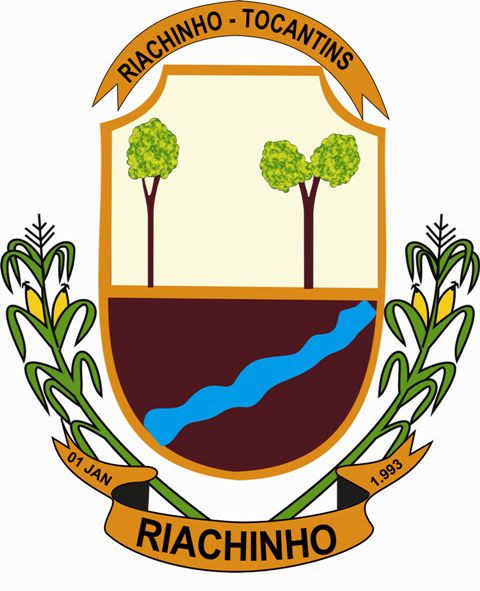
- Flag Coat of arms

- Location in Tocantins state

- Location in Brazil
- Coordinates: 6°26′16″S 48°8′13″W
- Country: Brazil
- Region: North
- State: Tocantins

Population (2020)
  - Total: 4,684
- Time zone: UTC−3 (BRT)

Riachinho is a municipality in the state of Tocantins in the Northern region of Brazil.

The municipality contains 3.43% of the 18,608 hectares (45,980 acres) Lago de Santa Isabel Environmental Protection Area, created in 2002.

== See also ==
- List of municipalities in Tocantins
