= Lago de Santa Isabel Environmental Protection Area =

Protected area in Tocantins, Brazil

- Área de Proteção Ambiental Lago de Santa Isabel
- IUCN category V (protected landscape/seascape)
- Location within Brazil
- Nearest city: Ananás, Tocantins
- Coordinates: 6°22′17″S 48°22′33″W
- Area: 18,608 ha (71.85 sq mi)
- Designation: Environmental protection area
- Created: 1 August 2002
- Administrator: Instituto Natureza do Tocantins

The Lago de Santa Isabel Environmental Protection Area (Portuguese: Área de Proteção Ambiental Lago de Santa Isabel) is an environmental protection area in the state of Tocantins, Brazil. It was created to protect the shores of the reservoir of a planned hydroelectric dam, which has not been given an environmental license. Vegetation is in the Amazon biome.

== Location ==
The Lago de Santa Isabel Environmental Protection Area (APA) is divided between the municipalities of Xambioá (43.28%), Riachinho (3.43%), Araguanã (1.28%) and Ananás (52%) in Tocantins. It has a total area of 18,608 hectares (45,980 acres). The APA protects land along the right (east) bank of the Araguaia River opposite the São Geraldo do Araguaia Environmental Protection Area and the Serra dos Martírios/Andorinhas State Park on the left (west) bank.

== History ==
The Lago de Santa Isabel Environmental Protection Area was created by decree 1.158 of 1 August 2002. The same decree created its managing council. It was created to Its objective is to protect and conserve biological diversity and to control the process of occupying the land around the reservoir of the planned Santa Isabel hydroelectric power plant. It would thus guarantee sustainability of natural resources and its aquatic and terrestrial environment. The projected dam would flood an area of 240 square kilometres (93 sq mi) and deliver 1,080 MW of power. In 2009 the Ministry of the Environment announced that it would not grant a license for the project.

== Environment ==
The Lago de Santa Isabel Environmental Protection Area is in the Amazon biome. Vegetation is 26% savannah-rainforest contact, 12% open rainforest and 8% dense rainforest.

== Sources ==
- APA Lago de Santa Isabel (in Portuguese), ISA: Instituto Socioambiental
- "Área de Proteção Ambiental Lago de Santa Isabel", Portal (in Portuguese), Governo do Tocantins
- Área de Proteção Ambiental Lago de Santa Isabel (in Portuguese), Via Rural, archived from the original on February 11, 2017
- "Santa Isabel Perfil da usina", Barragens na Amazonia (in Portuguese)
