= Serra dos Martírios/Andorinhas State Park =

State Park in Pará, Brazil

- Parque Estadual Serra dos Martírios/Andorinhas
- IUCN category II (national park)
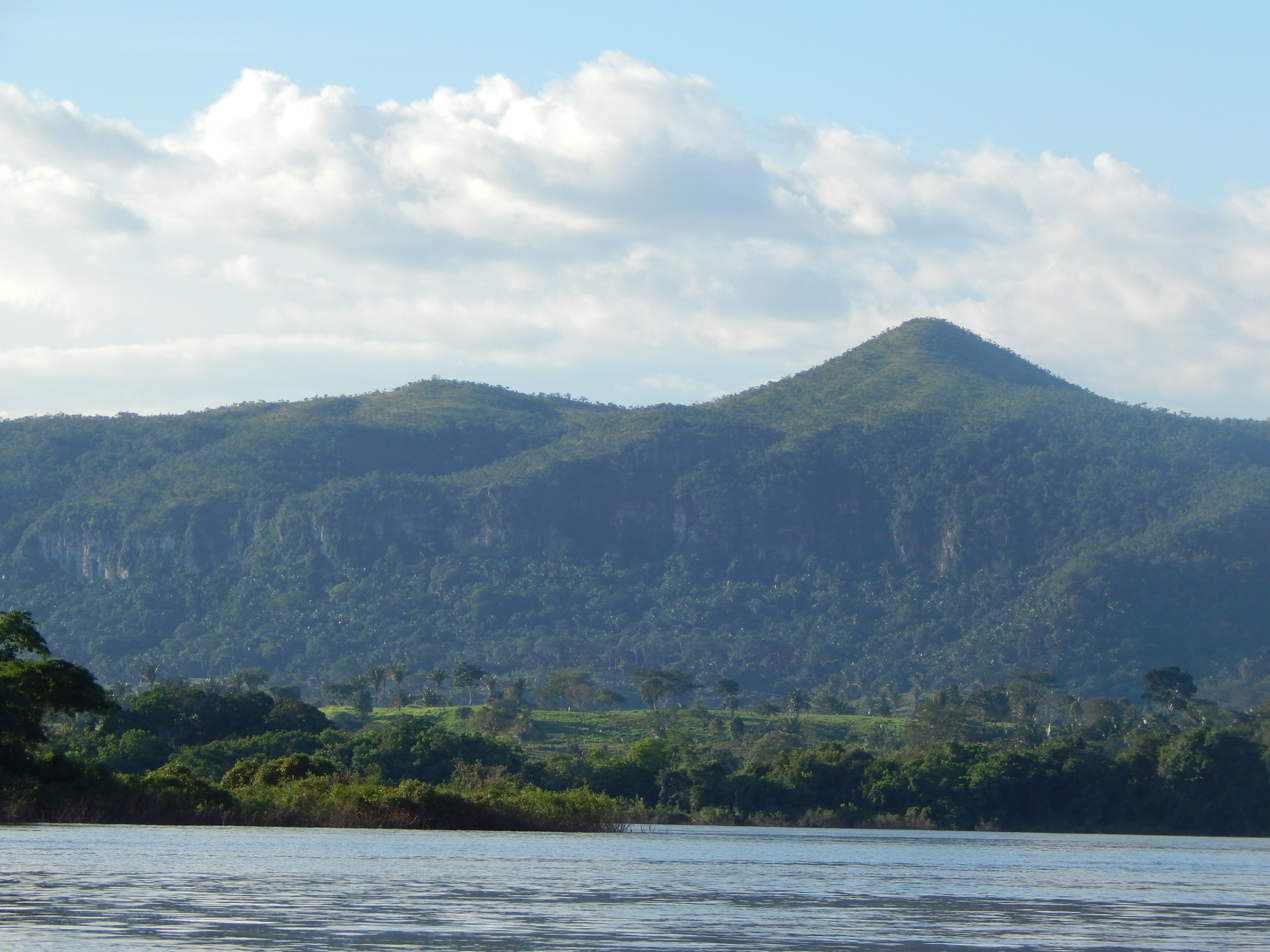
- Serra Das Andorinhas

- Location within Brazil
- Nearest city: São Geraldo do Araguaia, Pará
- Coordinates: 6.139942°S 48.529802°W
- Area: 24,897 hectares (61,520 acres)
- Designation: State park
- Created: 25 July 1996
- Administrator: Secretaria de Estado do Meio Ambiente

The Serra dos Martírios/Andorinhas State Park (Portuguese: Parque Estadual Serra dos Martírios/Andorinhas) is a state park in the state of Pará, Brazil. It protects a mountainous region of forests in the transition between the Amazon rainforest and cerrado biomes, beside the Araguaia River. The park contains caves that hold ancient rock carvings and paintings. Some of the caves are endangered by tourists or by local people who camp in them while they perform the annual Festival of the Divine Holy Spirit.

== Location ==
The Serra dos Martírios/Andorinhas State Park is in the municipality of São Geraldo do Araguaia in the state of Pará. It has an area of 24,897 hectares (61,520 acres). The park is surrounded by São Geraldo do Araguaia Environmental Protection Area, also established in 1996. The Serra das Andorinhas contains a steep fault escarpment with drops of 250 to 300 metres (820 to 980 ft). The Serra dos Martírios is the local name for an extension of the Serra das Andorinhas.

The Araguaia River to the southeast and east of the park forms the border with the state of Tocantins. It flows north from the park to join the Tocantins River from the left. The east of the massif drains into the Araguaia via alluvial terraces and floodplains. The center of the park is mainly drained by tributaries of the Sucupira River, which flows southeast into the Araguaia. The Sucupira River is an important supply of water for the region, and has high potential for hydroelectricity. In the north and central part of the park the main rivers are the Sororó, Sorozinho and Cardoso, which flow west and north to the Tocantins.

== History ==
In the 1960s and up to the mid-1970s the park was the base for fighters of the Guerrilha do Araguaia, an armed left-wing movement opposed to the military regime. The Serra dos Martírios (Martyrs Range) was renamed the Serra das Andorinhas (Swallows Range) after the guerrilha ended. The Serra dos Martírios/Andorinhas State Park was created by law 5.982 of 25 July 1996 to fully preserve the natural resources and scenic beauty, while supporting scientific, cultural, educational, recreational and tourist activities. The management plan was approved by ordinance 716 of 26 December 2006. The consultative council was formed and its members were named on 28 December 2009.

== Environment ==
The park covers a mountainous region in the transition between the Amazon rainforest and cerrado biomes, and has diverse ecosystems. It is home to the harpy eagle (Harpia harpyja), a highly endangered species in Brazil. The park has over 500 herbaceous and shrub species, over 150 tree species, 80 orchid species and 38 medicinal species. There are about 532 species of birds, mammals, reptiles, amphibians and fish, some of which are threatened in Brazil. The park has suffered in the past from illegal hunting, although as of 2011 this seemed to be less frequent. It was also used for subsistence farming by 83 families in 2011, using slash-and-burn techniques, and livestock grazing.

== Caves and archaeological sites ==
The park has many caves and 80 archaeological sites, with 150 cave paintings and over 5,000 rock engravings whose age is estimated at 8,300 years. As of 2011 there were problems with conservation of the caves, which were regularly damaged by fires, graffiti and religious events. They were also threatened by construction of the Santa Isabel hydroelectric power plant. Construction of the dam was proposed in the 1980s, with the first studies in 1986, later abandoned and then revived in 2000.

The Casa de Pedra (House of Stone) is in the north of the park with altitudes from 500 to 570 metres (1,640 to 1,870 ft), accessible only via a steep climb from the BR-153 highway about 5 kilometres (3.1 mi) to the west. The Casa de Pedra is a place where local people annually perform the Feast of the Divine Holy Spirit, a religious and cultural event that takes 9–10 days between April and May. The Divino tradition has its roots in old Portuguese folklore. Devotees have a church of the Trinity in the entrance of a large rock shelter, and since 1966 have walked to the Casa de Pedra from as far as 30 kilometres (19 mi) away for the ceremonies. They see images in the Casa de Pedra related to the divine dove. Dozens of men, women and children lodge in the caves and shelters for several days, and day and night participate in prayers, processions and songs.

== Visiting ==
There is a visitor center with lodgings, power supply, generator, computers and cellular telephone service. Attractions include the scenic beauty, caves, archaeological sites, waterfalls, tracks, and a gazebo from which to view the park and the Araguaia River. Visitors may walk along trails or take a 2–3 hour round trip by boat on the Araguaia River, which is in the buffer zone. The river is fast and very rocky, so requires an experienced pilot. Trails are mostly considered intermediate to difficult due to the rugged relief of the park. The most accessible trails have a climb of 4 to 6 kilometres (2.5 to 3.7 mi), some leading to tributaries of the Araguaia such as the Quarta Queda Waterfall, and others to places to view nature such as the Casa de Pedra region.

== Sources ==
- Crescencio, Genival (July 2011), "Parque Estadual Serra dos Martírios/Andorinhas: Desafios para a conservação de cavernas" (PDF), ANAIS do 31º Congresso Brasileiro de Espeleologia (in Portuguese), Ponta Grossa-PR: Sociedade Brasileira de Espeleologia
- Parque Estadual Serra dos Martírios-Andorinhas (in Portuguese), Ideflor-bio
- PES Serra dos Martírios/Andorinhas (in Portuguese), ISA: Instituto Socioambiental
- Silva, Regina Oliveira da (May–August 2009), "A pesquisa científica e a gestão ambiental no Parque Martírios-Andorinhas" (PDF), Bol. Mus. Para. Emílio Goeldi. Cienc. Hum. (in Portuguese), 4 (2), Belém: 325–327, doi:10.1590/S1981-81222009000200009
