= São Geraldo do Araguaia Environmental Protection Area =

Protected area in Pará, Brazil

- Área de Proteção Ambiental de São Geraldo do Araguaia
- IUCN category V (protected landscape/seascape)
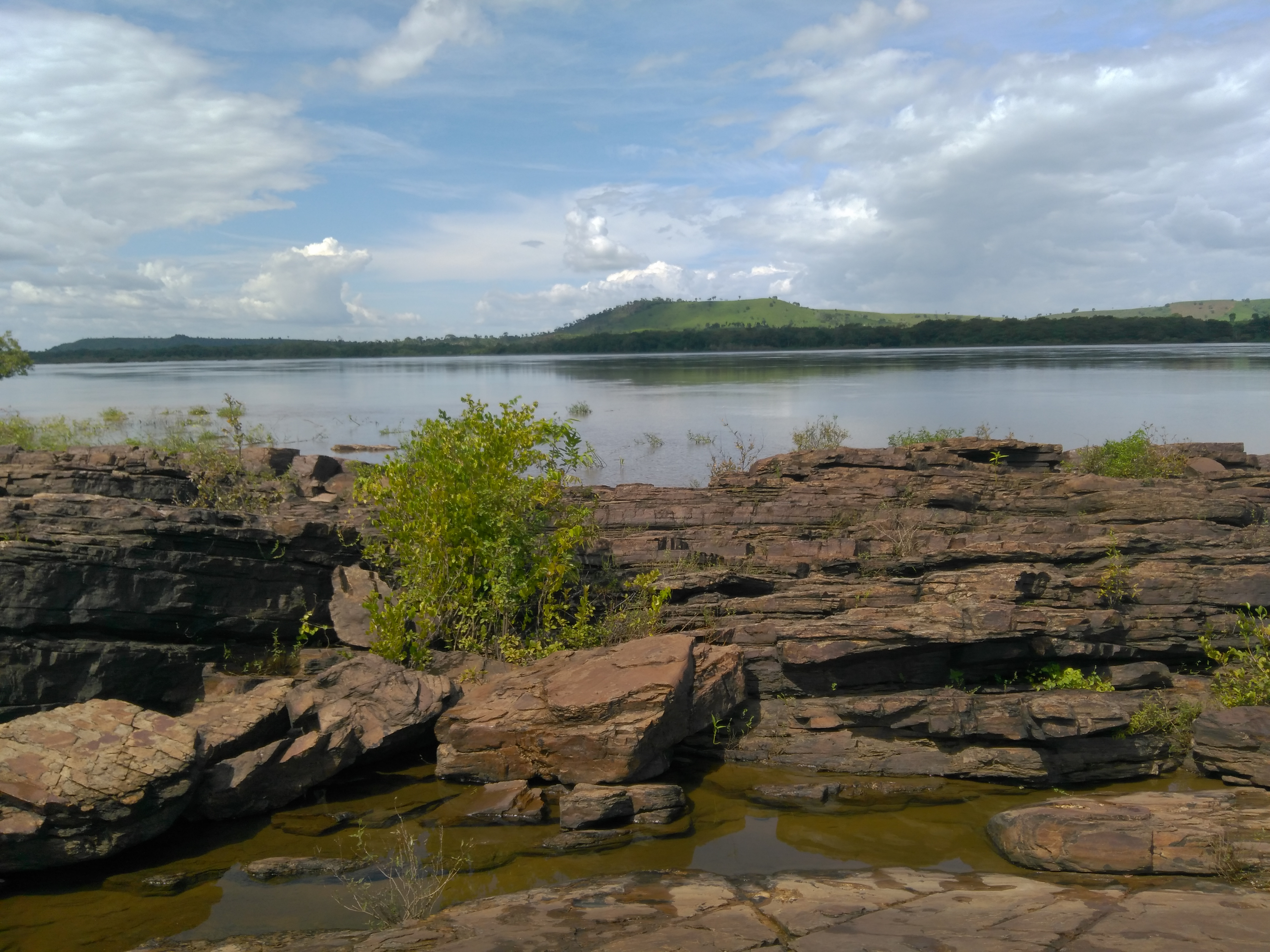
- Araguaia River in São Geraldo

- Location within Brazil
- Nearest city: São Geraldo do Araguaia, Pará
- Coordinates: 6°19′38″S 48°28′23″W
- Area: 29,655 ha (114.50 sq mi)
- Designation: Environmental protection area
- Created: 25 July 1996
- Administrator: Instituto de Desenvolvimento Florestal e da Biodiversidade do Estado do Pará

The São Geraldo do Araguaia Environmental Protection Area (Portuguese: Área de Proteção Ambiental de São Geraldo do Araguaia) is an environmental protection area in the state of Pará, Brazil. The original vegetation was dense rainforest, but it is now mostly used for cattle ranching. Visitor attractions include waterfalls and prehistoric rock carvings.

== Location ==
The São Geraldo do Araguaia Environmental Protection Area (APA) is in the municipality of São Geraldo do Araguaia, Pará. It has an area of 29,655 hectares (73,280 acres). The APA forms part of the buffer zone of the Serra dos Martírios/Andorinhas State Park as defined in the state park's management plan of 2006. The APA surrounds the state park on the left (west) bank of the Araguaia River. It is opposite the Lago de Santa Isabel Environmental Protection Area on the right (east) bank. Vegetation is dense rainforest.

== History ==
The region of the present APA was the base of the Araguaia Guerrilla, an armed left-wing movement, during the military regime in Brazil from the late 1960s to mid 1970s.

The São Geraldo do Araguaia Environmental Protection Area was created by law 5.983 of 25 July 1996. The APA was created as a buffer to reduce environmental impacts on the Serra dos Martírios / Andorinhas State Park, since the municipality of São Geraldo do Araguaia has almost all been deforested. It also aims to conserve and recover ecosystems, and to improve the quality of life of the local people through sustainable development programs. The deliberative council was created and its members were named on 28 December 2009.

== Economy ==
The APA mainly consists of private properties used for cattle ranching, facilitated by the gentle topography. There are three communities, Sucupira, Ilha de Campo and Santa Cruz dos Martírios. The last two are on the bank of the Araguaia River. There are parts of the "Tira-Catinga I" and "Boqueirão" Federal Settlement Projects in the APA. The local communities practice artisan fishing, agriculture and livestock raising.

== Attractions ==
The APA contains archaeological sites, caves, interesting rock formations, trails and waterfalls. It can be visited via the Araguaia River, but a local boat operator is advised since the river is fast and rock-filled. The Pedra Escrita and the Ilha dos Martírios in the middle of the river have inscriptions about 8,000 years old. Beaches form on the river, particularly in the summer, such as the Remanso dos Botos. The APA contains scenically beautiful waterfalls, including the Três Quedas, Riacho Fundo, do Spanner, do Honorato and Sem-Nome. The APA is home to the endangered harpy eagle (Harpia harpyja), the largest bird of prey in Brazil and the main bio-indicator of the APA.

== Sources ==
- APA de São Geraldo do Araguaia (in Portuguese), ISA: Instituto Socioambiental
- Área de Proteção Ambiental Araguaia (in Portuguese), Ideflor-bio: Instituto de Desenvolvimento Florestal e da Biodiversidade do Estado do Pará
- Área de Proteção Ambiental de São Geraldo do Araguaia (in Portuguese), Via Rural, archived from the original on February 11, 2017
