= Marcel Scalese =

Brazilian footballer

Marcel
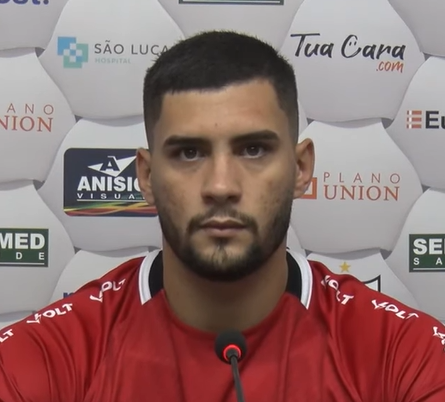
- Marcel in 2022

Personal information
- Full name: Marcel Philipe Afonso Genestra Scalese
- Date of birth: 17 April 1996 (age 30)
- Place of birth: São Paulo, Brazil
- Height: 1.90 m (6 ft 3 in)
- Position: Centre-back

Team information
- Current team: Port
- Number: 20

Youth career
- 2011: Brasilis
- 2012–2013: Guarani
- 2014: Atlético Sorocaba
- 2015: Palmeiras
- 2015–2016: Bragantino

Senior career*
Years	Team	Apps	(Gls)
2016–2018	Bragantino	4	(0)
2019	XV de Piracicaba	4	(0)
2020–2022	Cascavel	21	(2)
2021	→ Criciúma (loan)	31	(0)
2022	→ CSA (loan)	12	(2)
2022–2023	Botafogo-SP	27	(1)
2023–2024	Ituano	44	(1)
2024	Shandong Taishan	10	(0)
2025	Ehime	7	(0)
2026	Amazonas	4	(0)
2026–	Port	0	(0)
- * Club domestic league appearances and goals as of 31 July 2026

Marcel Philipe Afonso Genestra Scalese (born 17 April 1996), known as Marcel Scalese or just Marcel, is a Brazilian footballer who plays as a centre-back for Thai League 1 club Port.

== Career ==
Marcel was born in São Paulo, and represented Bragantino as a youth. He made his first team debut on 8 November 2016, starting in a 1–1 Série B away draw against Joinville.

On 17 January 2019, after being rarely used, Marcel left Braga and joined XV de Piracicaba. In December, he was included in FC Cascavel's squad for the upcoming season.

On 27 January 2021, Marcel was announced at Criciúma on loan. On 20 December, he moved to CSA also in a temporary deal.

On 31 May 2022, Marcel was announced at Botafogo-SP. After helping in their promotion to the second division, he moved to Ituano on 10 April 2023.

== Career statistics ==
As of 11 January 2024

Club	Season	League			State League		Cup		Continental		Other		Total	
Club	Season	Division	Apps	Goals	Apps	Goals	Apps	Goals	Apps	Goals	Apps	Goals	Apps	Goals
Bragantino	2016	Série B	2	0	0	0	0	0	—		18 (Note: Appearance(s) in Copa Paulista)	3	20	3
Bragantino	2017	Série C	1	0	1	0	0	0	—		—		2	0
Bragantino	2018	Série C	2	0	0	0	1	0	—		9	0	12	0
Bragantino	Total		5	0	1	0	1	0	—		27	3	34	3
XV de Piracicaba	2019	Paulista A2	—		4	0	—		—		7	0	11	0
Cascavel	2020	Série D	7	0	14	2	—		—		—		21	2
Criciúma	2021	Série C	23	0	8	0	5	1	—		2 (Note: Appearance(s) in Copa Santa Catarina)	0	38	1
CSA	2022	Série B	0	0	12	2	1	0	—		5 (Note: Appearance(s) in Copa do Nordeste)	1	18	3
Botafogo-SP	2022	Série C	17	1	—		—		—		2	1	19	2
Botafogo-SP	2023	Série B	0	0	10	0	0	0	—		—		10	0
Botafogo-SP	Total		17	1	10	0	0	0	—		2	1	29	2
Ituano	2023	Série B	27	1	—		2	0	—		—		29	1
Ituano	2024	Série B	9	0	8	0	—		—		—		17	0
Ituano	Total		36	1	8	0	2	0	—		—		46	1
Career total			79	2	49	4	9	1	0	0	43	5	180	12
