= Lucas Tocantins =

Brazilian footballer

Personal information
- Full name: Lucas Costa da Silva
- Date of birth: 25 July 1994 (age 32)
- Place of birth: São Geraldo do Araguaia, Brazil
- Height: 1.80 m (5 ft 11 in)
- Position: Attacking midfielder

Team information
- Current team: Port
- Number: 27

Youth career
- Botafogo (SP)

Senior career*
Years	Team	Apps	(Gls)
2014–2016	Botafogo (SP)	0	(0)
2014	→ Diadema (loan)	17	(3)
2015	→ Ivinhema (loan)	14	(2)
2015	→ Maringá (loan)	9	(2)
2016	Athletico Paranaense	0	(0)
2017	Ivinhema	9	(1)
2017–2020	Cascavel	43	(14)
2018	→ Rio Claro (loan)	7	(3)
2019	→ Coritiba (loan)	5	(0)
2020–2021	Chapecoense	15	(1)
2021	Remo	39	(6)
2022	Santo André	13	(2)
2022	Novorizontino	14	(1)
2023	Água Santa	9	(2)
2023	→ ABC (loan)	8	(0)
2023–2025	São Bernardo	42	(5)
2025	Volta Redonda	10	(0)
2025–	Port	5	(3)
- * Club domestic league appearances and goals as of 24 October 2025

Lucas Costa da Silva (born 25 July 1994), better known as Lucas Tocantins, is a Brazilian professional footballer who plays as an attacking midfielder for Thai League 1 club Port FC.

== Honours ==
Maringá

- Taça FPF: 2015

Chapecoense

- Campeonato Catarinense: 2020
- Campeonato Brasileiro Série B: 2020

Remo

- Copa Verde: 2021

Port

- Thai League Cup: 2025–26
