= São Geraldo do Araguaia =

Coordinates: 6°24′S 48°32′W

- Municipality
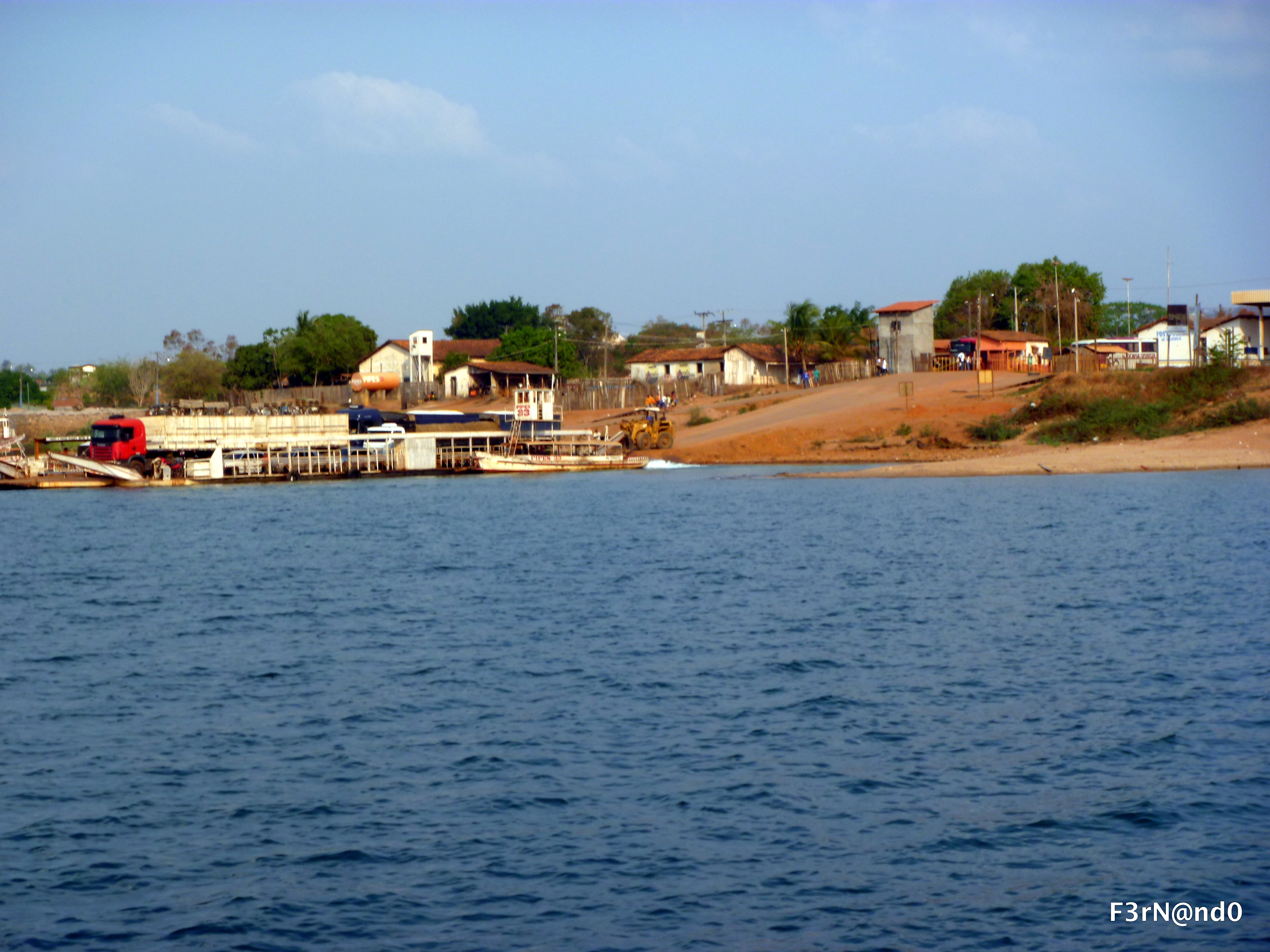

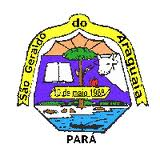
- Flag Coat of arms

- Location in Pará
- Country: Brazil
- Region: Northern
- State: Pará
- Mesoregion: Sudeste Paraense

Population (2020)
  - Total: 24,705
- Time zone: UTC−3 (BRT)

São Geraldo do Araguaia is a municipality in the state of Pará in the Northern region of Brazil.

The municipality contains the 24,897-hectare (61,520-acre) Serra dos Martírios/Andorinhas State Park, created in 1996. It contains the 29,655-hectare (73,280-acre) São Geraldo do Araguaia Environmental Protection Area, created at the same time.

== See also ==
- List of municipalities in Pará
