= Rebin Sulaka =

Assyrian Iraqi footballer

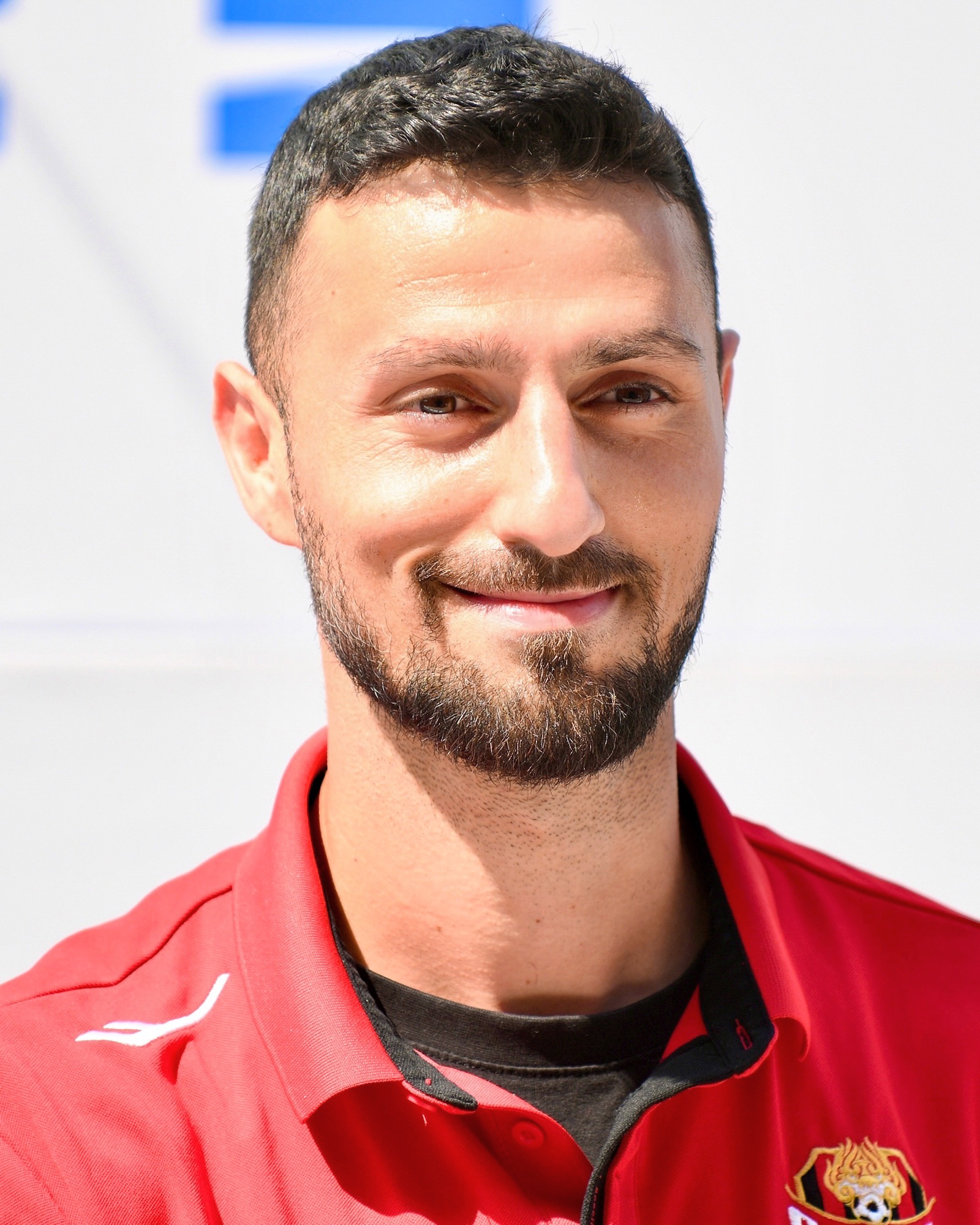
- Sulaka with FC Seoul in 2024

Personal information
- Full name: Rebin Gharib Sulaka Adhamat
- Date of birth: 12 April 1992 (age 34)
- Place of birth: Ankawa, Erbil, Iraq
- Height: 1.92 m (6 ft 4 in)
- Position: Centre back

Team information
- Current team: Port
- Number: 22

Youth career
- Eskilstuna City

Senior career*
Years	Team	Apps	(Gls)
2010–2013	Eskilstuna City	53	(4)
2013–2014	Dalkurd	21	(0)
2014–2015	Ljungskile SK	20	(0)
2015	Syrianska	9	(0)
2015–2016	→ Eskilstuna (loan)	5	(0)
2016–2017	Elverum	35	(1)
2017–2018	Al-Markhiya	22	(1)
2018–2019	Al-Khor	14	(1)
2019	Al-Shahania	7	(2)
2019–2020	Radnički Niš	13	(0)
2020–2021	Arda Kardzhali	12	(0)
2021	Levski Sofia	5	(0)
2021–2023	Buriram United	71	(1)
2023–2024	Brommapojkarna	4	(0)
2024	FC Seoul	3	(0)
2024–2025	Schaffhausen	8	(1)
2025	Erbil SC	9	(0)
2025–2026	Port	28	(0)

International career^{‡}
2015–2026	Iraq	58	(1)
- * Club domestic league appearances and goals as of 16 September 2026 ‡ National team caps and goals as of 16 September 2026

Rebin Gharib Sulaka Adhamat (Kurdish: ڕێبین سولاقا, romanized: Řêbîn Sûlaqa, Arabic: ريبين غريب سولاقا عظمت; born 12 April 1992) is an Iraqi professional footballer who plays as a centre back for Thai League 1 club Port.

== Club career ==
Sulaka started playing football in Eskilstuna City, where he as a 15-year-old made his debut in the first team. After the 2012 season, he did not renew the contract with the club. For the 2013 season he signed for Dalkurd FF. In January 2014 he signed a three-year contract with Ljungskile SK. In February 2015 wrote Sulaka on for Syrianska. In August 2015, he was loaned out to AFC United.

=== Elverum ===
Sulaka signed for Norwegian club Elverum for the 2016 season. After a successful season that ended in promotion to the second tier, he extended his contract for the 2017 season. He left the club mid-season and moved to Qatar.

=== Al-Markhiya ===
On 9 July 2017, Sulaka signed for Qatari club Al-Markhiya. He made his debut on 16 September, playing the full 90 minutes in a shock victory against giants Al-Sadd. He was picked in the team of the week for his performance.

=== Radnički Niš ===
Recently arrived at Radnički Niš, coach Milorad Kosanović expressed to the club management Sulaka to be his main desire to reinforce the defense, so the Serbian club signed him on 30 August 2019, a day before the closing of the transfer-window in Serbia and most of Europe.

=== Levski Sofia ===
In January 2021 Sulaka signed a six-month deal with Levski Sofia. In the spring of 2021 he left the club, which was experiencing financial troubles.

=== Buriram United ===
On 6 August 2021, Sulaka signed with Thai League 1 club Buriram United. He make his debut for the club on 4 September 2021 in a goalless draw against Suphanburi. Sulaka went on to helped his club win the domestic treble in his first season.

On 19 January 2022, Sulaka scored his first goal for the club in the 2021–22 Thai FA Cup round of 16 fixture against Chiangrai United in a 4–1 win. He then went on to win another domestic treble with the club in his second season.

=== Brommapojkarna ===
On 7 July 2023, Sulaka signed with Brommapojkarna in Sweden.

=== FC Seoul ===
On 21 February 2024, Sulaka joined FC Seoul of South Korean K League 1. He played in three matches during the season before coming to a mutual agreement with the club to terminate the contract in June.

=== Schaffhausen ===
On 9 September 2024, Sulaka signed with Schaffhausen in Switzerland.

=== Port ===
On 20 July 2025, Sulaka signed with Thai League 1 club Port. He make his debut on 17 August in a 3–1 win over Ayutthaya United. He ended the season with the club helping them to win the 2025 Piala Presiden and 2025–26 Thai League Cup.

== International career ==
On 12 June 2015, Sulaka played his first game for the Iraq national team against Japan in Yokohama where the match ended in a 4–0 defeat. Rebin was present in the final rounds of Iraq's 2018 FIFA World Cup qualifying campaign, in which Iraq failed to qualify to the final tournament. In 2019, he was chosen in the Iraqi squad for the 2019 AFC Asian Cup.

On 20 February 2022, Sulaka announced his retirement from international football for personal reasons. However, he announced a reversal of his retirement on 16 August 2023. In December 2023, Sulaka was named in the Iraqi squad for the 2023 AFC Asian Cup in Qatar where he scored his first international goal against Vietnam on 24 January 2024.

Sulaka was then selected in Iraq squad in the 2026 FIFA World Cup where he would go on to play against France in the second group stage match. In the last group stage match, Sulaka was in the starting lined up against Senegal, however in the 13th minute, he was sent off with a red card after pulling Sadio Mané down in a denial of a goalscoring opportunity. Sulaka announced his retirement from the national team right after the tournament concluded.

== Personal life ==
Sulaka was born in the suburb of Ankawa in Erbil, Iraq into an ethnic Assyrian Christian family. In 2002, at the age of 10, Sulaka moved to Sweden with his family.

== Career statistics ==
=== International ===
As of match played 26 March 2024

Appearances and goals by national team and year
National team	Year	Apps	Goals
Iraq	2015	1	0
Iraq	2016	1	0
Iraq	2017	8	0
Iraq	2018	5	0
Iraq	2019	7	0
Iraq	2021	5	0
Iraq	2023	6	0
Iraq	2024	6	1
Total		38	1

Scores and results list Iraq's goal tally first, score column indicates score after each Sulaka goal.

No.	Date	Venue	Opponent	Score	Result	Competition
1.	24 January 2024	Jassim bin Hamad Stadium, Al Rayyan, Qatar	Vietnam	1–1	3–2	2023 AFC Asian Cup

== Honours ==
=== Club ===
Buriram United

- Thai League 1: 2021–22, 2022–23
- Thai FA Cup: 2021–22, 2022–23
- Thai League Cup: 2021–22, 2022–23

Port

- Thai League Cup: 2025–26
- Piala Presiden: 2025
