= Leonardo Kalil =

Brazilian footballer

Personal information
- Full name: Leonardo Kalil Abdala
- Date of birth: 10 April 1996 (age 30)
- Place of birth: São Paulo, Brazil
- Height: 1.85 m (6 ft 1 in)
- Position: Forward

Team information
- Current team: Port
- Number: 7

Youth career
- São Paulo
- Criciúma

Senior career*
Years	Team	Apps	(Gls)
2014–2019	Criciúma	32	(0)
2016	→ Albirex Niigata (Loan)	2	(0)
2019	União Rondonópolis	7	(2)
2020	Portuguesa Santista	9	(6)
2020–2021	Oeste	24	(4)
2022	São Joseense	12	(1)
2022	→ Operário Ferroviário (loan)	11	(2)
2023	Bucheon FC 1995	16	(2)
2023–2024	Gyeongju KHNP	41	(16)
2025	Gyeongnam	28	(2)
2026–	Port	13	(4)
- * Club domestic league appearances and goals as of 2 May 2026

Leonardo Kalil Abdala (born 10 April 1996) is a Brazilian professional footballer who plays as a forward for Thai League 1 club Port.

== Youth ==
Recording two goals in the Copa São Paulo de Futebol Júnior, Kalil was the top scorer for old outfit Criciuma's U-20 selection. He asserted that it was because of essential daily training. He is an Arab-Brazilian

== Career ==
In 2016, Kalil joined J1 League club Albirex Niigata.

On 9 January 2023, he joined Bucheon FC 1995 of South Korea's K League 2. In July 2023, he transferred to Gyeongju KHNP FC in the K3 League.

== Honours ==
Port

- Thai League Cup: 2025–26
