= Hugo Boutsingkham =

French footballer (born 2003)

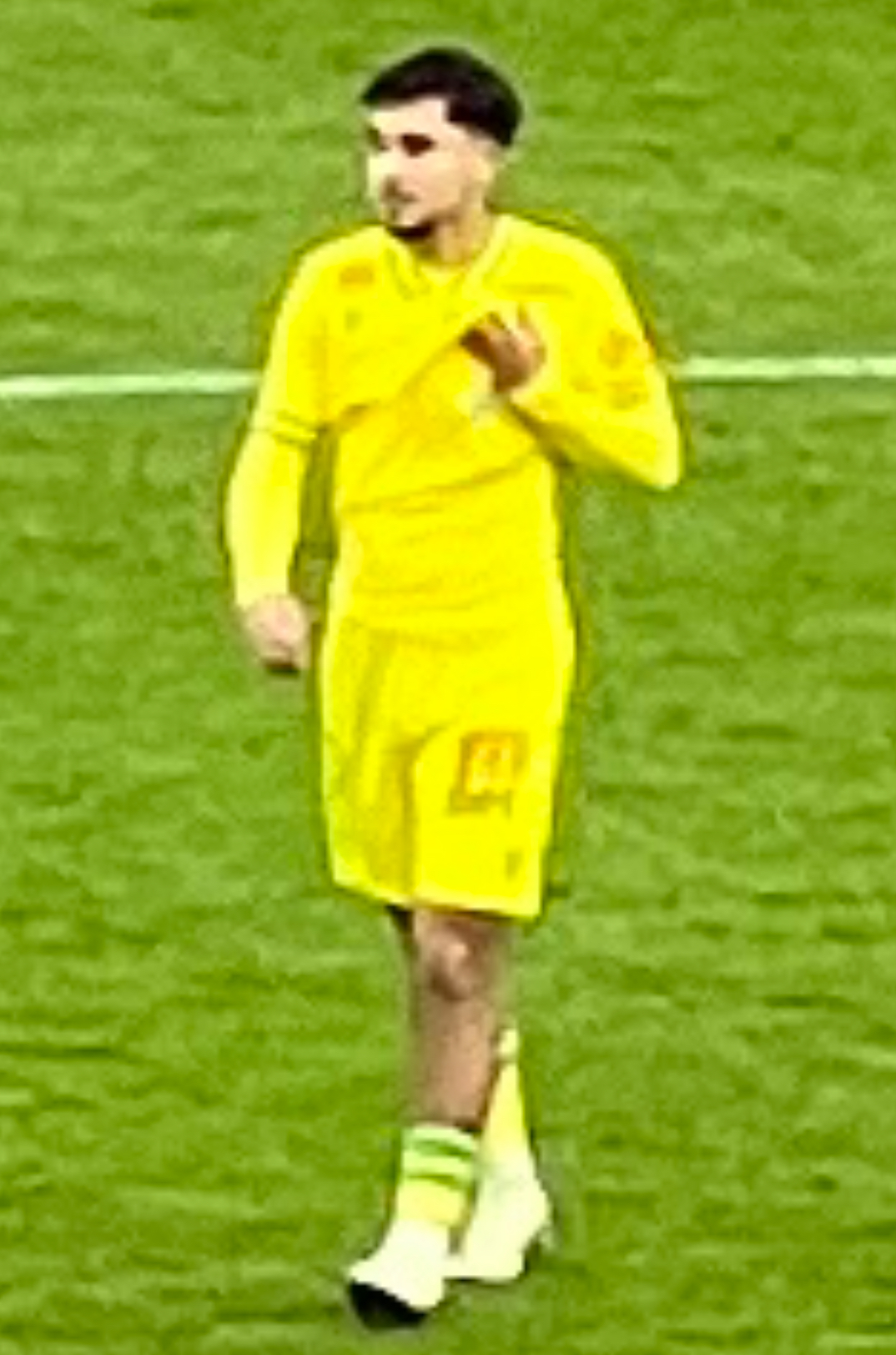

Personal information
- Full name: Hugo Boutsingkham
- Date of birth: 20 January 2003 (age 23)
- Place of birth: Champs-sur-Marne, France
- Height: 1.73 m (5 ft 8 in)
- Positions: Left-back; midfielder

Team information
- Current team: Port
- Number: 23

Youth career
- 2009 –2018: AS Champs
- 2018–2022: Nantes

Senior career*
Years	Team	Apps	(Gls)
2022–2024	Nantes II	62	(6)
2024–2025	Nantes	2	(0)
2025	→ Stade Briochin (loan)	10	(2)
2025–	Port	4	(0)

International career^{‡}
2018–2019	France U16	8	(0)
2019	France U17	3	(0)
- * Club domestic league appearances and goals as of 28 November 2025 ‡ National team caps and goals as of 18 December 2019

Hugo Boutsingkham (Thai: อูโก้ บุตรสิงห์คำ; born 20 January 2003) is a French professional footballer who plays as a left back for Thai League 1 club Port.

== Club career ==
Born in Champs-sur-Marne, Boutsingkham started his youth career playing for AS Champs, before he transferred to FC Nantes in 2018. He began his senior career with the reserves of Nantes in 2022, before being promoted to their senior side in January 2024. He made his first team debut on 5 January 2024 in a 4–1 Coupe de France win against Pau. Three weeks later, he made his professional debut with Nantes as a late substitute in a goalless Ligue 1 tie with Reims.

On 3 February 2025, Boutsingkham was loaned to Stade Briochin.

== International career ==
Born in France from a Lao-Thai father and a French mother, Boutsingkham is eligible to represent Laos, Thailand or France in the international level. He represented France at youth level, having played for France U16 and France U17.

== Honours ==
Nantes U19

- Championnat National U19: 2021–22

Port

- Thai League Cup: 2025–26
