= Peerawat Akkratum =

Thai footballer (born 1998)

Personal information
- Full name: Peerawat Akkratum
- Date of birth: 3 December 1998 (age 27)
- Place of birth: Sakon Nakhon, Thailand
- Height: 1.80 m (5 ft 11 in)
- Positions: Defensive midfielder; centre back

Team information
- Current team: Port
- Number: 36

Youth career
- 2011–2015: Buriram United

Senior career*
Years	Team	Apps	(Gls)
2016–2019	Buriram United	0	(0)
2018–2019	→ Prachuap (loan)	15	(0)
2019	→ Kasetsart (loan)	12	(0)
2020–2025	Prachuap	117	(4)
2025–	Port	23	(0)

International career
2017	Thailand U21	6	(0)
2017–2020	Thailand U23	8	(1)
2026–	Thailand	3	(0)
Medal record
Men's football
Representing Thailand
FIFA ASEAN Cup
Runner-up	2026 Indonesia	Team
SEA Games
Gold medal – first place	2017 Kuala Lumpur	Football
- * Club domestic league appearances and goals as of 04:16, 16 March 2026 (UTC)

Peerawat Akkratum (Thai: พีฬาวัช อรรคธรรม, born 3 December 1998) is a Thai professional footballer who plays for Thai League 1 club Port F.C. and the Thailand national team. He is a versatile defender who plays as a defensive midfielder or right or left back. Previously, he played for PT Prachuap F.C. for 7 seasons, winning the 2019 Thai League Cup, and has made over 100 appearances in the Thai League 1. He was part of the Thailand national under-23 football team that won the gold medal at the 2017 SEA Games.

== Honours ==
=== Club ===
==== Port ====
- Thai League Cup: 2025–26

Individual

- Thai League 1 Team of the Season: 2025–26

=== International ===
==== Thailand ====
- FIFA ASEAN Cup runner-up: 2026
- King's Cup: 2026
