= 2017 Bangkok United F.C. season =

Bangkok United
2017 season
- Chairman: Kajorn Chearavanont
- Manager: Alexandré Pölking
- Stadium: Thammasat Stadium, Khlong Luang, Pathum Thani, Thailand
- Thai League T1: 3rd
- Thai FA Cup: Runners-up
- Thai League Cup: Round of 16
- AFC Champions League: Preliminary Round 2
- Top goalscorer: League: Dragan Bošković (38); All: Dragan Bošković (42)
Home colours	Away colours	Third colours

The 2017 season marks Bangkok United's 11th appearance in the Thai League T1 and 5th-consecutive season in the top flight of Thai football. Brazilian Alexandré Pölking was manager for the side in his 4th season in charge.

== Game log ==
Date (2017)	Opponents	H / A	Result F–A	Scorers	League position
12 Feb	Navy	H	1–0	Jaycee 25'	6th
18 Feb	Thai Honda Ladkrabang	A	0–1		10th
25 Feb	Port	H	6–2	Teeratep (4) 21' (pen.), 27' (pen.), 62', 87', Pokklaw 32', Macena 90+1'	5th
5 Mar	Ubon UMT United	A	3–3	Dragan (3) 18' (pen.), 66', 90+2' (pen.)	5th
8 Mar	Chiangrai United	H	0–3		7th
11 Mar	Bangkok Glass	A	2–3	Jaycee 22', Putthinan 68'	10th
3 Apr	Sukhothai	H	4–2	Jaycee (2) 7', 25', Dragan 45+2' (pen.), Macena 69'	9th
9 Apr	BEC Tero Sasana	A	0–2		10th
18 Apr	Chonburi	A	5–1	Chonlatit 14' (o.g.), Dragan (3) 59', 75', 76', Macena 90+3'	9th
23 Apr	Pattaya United	H	5–1	Dragan (5) 19', 22' (pen.), 43', 77', 90+3'	7th
29 Apr	Nakhon Ratchasima Mazda	A	0–0		8th
3 May	SCG Muangthong United	H	2–4	Aoyama 14' (o.g.), Mario 70'	9th
6 May	Super Power Samut Prakan	A	5–2	Mario (3) 12', 28', 32', Dragan (2) 16', 19' (pen.)	8th
13 May	Sisaket	H	5–1	Mario (2) 21', 52', Pokklaw (2) 26', 78', Teeratep 58'	6th
17 May	Ratchaburi Mitr Phol	A	2–1	Mario (2) 43', 90+2'	5th
21 May	Suphanburi	H	4–0	Dragan (2) 17', 77', Sanrawat 25', Mario 78'	5th
27 May	Buriram United	A	1–2	Mario 90+2'	6th
18 Jun	Thai Honda Ladkrabang	H	5–4	Mario 3', Dragan (2) 19' (pen.), 74', Sanrawat 49', Sumanya 77'	6th
25 Jun	Port	A	3–0	Dragan (2) 77' (pen.), 89', Mario 82'	5th
28 Jun	Ubon UMT United	H	3–2	Pokklaw (2) 22', 23', Dragan 90+3' (pen.)	4th
1 Jul	Chiangrai United	A	2–0	Pokklaw 81', Sanrawat 90+4'	4th
5 Jul	Bangkok Glass	H	5–4	Dragan (3) 22' (pen.), 67' (pen.), 90+4', Mario 79', Manuel 90+3'	3rd
8 Jul	Sukhothai	A	4–1	Mario 28', Dragan (2) 34', 89', Teeratep 37'	3rd
29 Jul	BEC Tero Sasana	H	5–2	Putthinan 12', Teeratep 23', Sumanya 31', Manuel 53', Ede 86'	3rd
5 Aug	Chonburi	H	7–2	Dragan (4) 25' (pen.), 35', 45', 72', Pokklaw 48', Sanrawat 59', Mika 80'	3rd
10 Sep	Pattaya United	A	0–1		3rd
16 Sep	Nakhon Ratchasima Mazda	H	2–0	Teeratep 45+4', Tavares 53'	3rd
20 Sep	SCG Muangthong United	A	0–4		3rd
23 Sep	Super Power Samut Prakan	H	4–0	Dragan 23', Mario 63', Alexander 76', Mika 88'	3rd
14 Oct	Sisaket	A	7–2	Dragan (3) 22', 62', 79', Alexander 33', Teeratep 48', Mario 56', Pokklaw 70'	3rd
22 Oct	Ratchaburi Mitr Phol	H	2–1	Dragan (2) 6', 84'	3rd
8 Nov	Suphanburi	A	1–1	Dragan 66' (pen.)	3rd
12 Nov	Buriram United	H	1–3	Mario 61'	3rd
18 Nov	Navy	A	1–2	Dragan 45+2' (pen.)	3rd

Pos	Team	Pld	W	D	L	GF	GA	GD	Pts	Qualification or relegation
1	Buriram United (C, Q)	34	27	5	2	85	22	+63	86	Qualification to 2018 AFC Champions League Group stage
2	SCG Muangthong United (Q)	34	22	6	6	79	29	+50	72	Qualification to 2018 AFC Champions League Preliminary round 2
3	Bangkok United	34	21	3	10	97	57	+40	66	
4	Chiangrai United (Q)	34	18	6	10	67	42	+25	60	Qualification to 2018 AFC Champions League Preliminary round 2 (Note: Chiangrai United qualified for the 2018 AFC Champions League Preliminary round 2 as winners of the 2017 Thai FA Cup.)
5	Bangkok Glass	34	16	8	10	63	44	+19	56	

Updated to match(es) played on 18 November 2017. Source: Thai League
Rules for classification: 1) Points; 2) Head-to-head points; 3) Head-to-head goals difference; 4) Head-to-head goals scored; 5) Overall goals difference; 6) Overall goals scored; 7) Fair play points; 8) Play-off without extra time;).
(C) Champions; (Q) Qualified for the phase indicated

== Thai FA Cup ==
Date (2017)	Opponents	H / A	Result F–A	Scorers	Round
21 Jun	Chiangrai City	A	5–1	Dragan 18', Teeratep (3) 27', 41', 45+1', Sathaporn 90+2'	Round of 64
2 Aug	Nakhon Ratchasima Mazda	H	3–0	Dragan 54', Jaycee 71', Teeratep 85'	Round of 32
27 Sep	Port	H	5–1	Todsapol 11' (o.g.), Dragan 16', Jaycee (2) 37', 90+2' (pen.), Mika 55'	Round of 16
18 Oct	Suphanburi	A	http://www.thaileague.co.th/official/?r=Match/PrintPostMatchPDF&iMatchID=4074 (a.e.t.)	Dragan 113'	Quarter-finals
1 Nov	JL Chiangmai United	N	3–0	Pokklaw 5', Jaycee 28', Sumanya 63'	Semi-finals
25 Nov	Chiangrai United	N	2–4	Pokklaw 6', Jaycee 74'	Final

== Thai League Cup ==
Date	Opponents	H / A	Result F–A	Scorers	Round
26 July 2017	Army United	A	3–0	Tavares 23', Ede 34', Jaycee 63'	Round of 32
1 October 2017	SCG Muangthong United	A	1–2	Jaycee 22'	Round of 16

== AFC Champions League ==
=== Qualifying rounds ===
Date	Opponents	H / A	Result F–A	Scorers	Round
31 January 2017	(Malaysia) Johor Darul Ta'zim	H	1–1 (a.e.t.) (4–5p)	Jaycee 120+1'	Preliminary round 2

== Reserve team in Thai League 4 ==
Bangkok United sent its reserve team to compete in T4 Bangkok Metropolitan Region as Bangkok United B.

Date (2017)	Opponents	H / A	Result F–A	Scorers	League position
13 Feb	Grakcu Looktabfah Pathum Thani	H	0–0		6th
19 Feb	Samut Prakan	A	0–0		7th
25 Feb	BCC	A	3–1	Nattawut 1', Jirayu 61', Jakkit 80'	6th
5 Mar	Kopoon Warrior	H	2–2	Athatcha 35', Suppaluk 66'	3rd
19 Mar	Dome	H	1–0	Worawut 55' (pen.)	4th
25 Mar	PTU Pathum Thani	A	2–1	Wisarut 11', Nattawut 81'	1st
1 Apr	Rangsit University	H	3–1	Nattawut (3) 5', 25' (pen.), 80'	1st
8 Apr	Samut Prakan United	H	5–1	Sasalak 55', Jedsadakorn 71', Nattawut 80', Jirayu (2) 89', 90+2'	1st
30 Apr	Bangkok Glass B	A	3–3	Sasalak 30', Siwarut 42', Jirayu 53'	1st
6 May	North Bangkok University	H	1–2	Nattawut 85' (pen.)	2nd
15 May	Grakcu Looktabfah Pathum Thani	A	1–1	Jirayu 87'	3rd
22 May	Samut Prakan	H	3–2	Jakkit 32', Sathaporn 60', Ekkachai 90+2'	2nd
28 May	Bangkok Glass B	H	4–5	Srayut 52', Nattawut 68' (pen.), Jirayu 72', Jedsadakorn 82'	3rd
3 Jun	Kopoon Warrior	A	0–1		3rd
26 Jun	Dome	A	1–1	Nattawut 60'	3rd
2 Jul	PTU Pathum Thani	H	3–1	Athatcha 9', Nattawut (2) 42' (pen.), 83'	2nd
9 Jul	Rangsit University	A	1–1	Jakkit 89'	2nd
12 Jul	Samut Prakan United	A	3–0	Nattawut 34', Srayut 37', Siripong 76'	2nd
15 Jul	BCC	H	1–1	Jakkapan 77'	2nd
19 Jul	North Bangkok University	A	4–3	Nattawut (2) 23', 85', Srayut 25', Jedsadakorn 63'	2nd
22 Jul	Grakcu Looktabfah Pathum Thani	H	1–0	Techin 66'	2nd
30 Jul	Samut Prakan	H	1–3	Nattawut 83'	2nd
5 Aug	Kopoon Warrior	A	0–1		2nd
9 Aug	Bangkok Glass B	A	2–0	Wisarut (2) 53', 71'	1st
16 Aug	Dome	H	0–2		3rd
19 Aug	PTU Pathum Thani	H	0–0		3rd
27 Aug	Rangsit University	H	3–1	Nattawut 47', Wisarut 55', Jirayu 66'	3rd
30 Aug	Samut Prakan United	H	4–1	Wisarut 75', Nattawut (3) 82', 86', 90+3'	3rd
2 Sep	BCC	H	3–2	Jirayu 51', Nattawut 87', Worawut 90+2'	3rd
10 Sep	North Bangkok University	H	1–2	Nattawut 75'	3rd

Pos	Team	Pld	W	D	L	GF	GA	GD	Pts	Qualification or relegation
1	North Bangkok University (C, Q)	30	15	11	4	50	27	+23	56	Qualification to the Thai League 4 Champions League
2	Samut Prakan (Q)	30	14	9	7	51	29	+22	51 (Note: All head-to-head records was equivalent. Samut Prakan ahead on overall goals difference; Rangsit University +22, Bangkok United B +17.)	Qualification to the Thai League 4 Champions League
3	Bangkok United B	30	14	9	7	56	39	+17	51	
4	BCC	30	12	9	9	49	37	+12	45	
5	Dome	30	11	10	9	32	28	+4	43	

Updated to match(es) played on 20 October 2017. Source: Thai League 4
Rules for classification: 1) Points; 2) Head-to-head points; 3) Head-to-head goals difference; 4) Head-to-head goals scored; 5) Overall goals difference; 6) Overall goals scored; 7) Fair play points; 8) Play-off without extra time;).
(C) Champions; (Q) Qualified for the phase indicated

== Goals ==
No.	Pos.	Name	League	FA Cup	League Cup	Asia	Total
1	GK	(Thailand) Kittipong Phuthawchueak	0	0	0	0	0
2	MF	(Thailand) Ekkachai Sumrei	0	0	0	0	0
4	DF	(Thailand) Panupong Wongsa (vc)	0	0	0	0	0
5	DF	(Thailand) Putthinan Wannasri	1	0	0	0	1
6	MF	(Thailand) Anthony Ampaipitakwong	0	0	0	0	0
7	MF	(Montenegro) Dragan Bošković	36	0	0	0	36
8	MF	(Thailand) Wittaya Madlam (c)	0	0	0	0	0
9	MF	(Iran) Mehrdad Pooladi	0	0	0	0	0
10	FW	(Brazil) Gilberto Macena	3	0	0	0	3
11	MF	(Thailand) Sumanya Purisai	1	0	0	0	1
13	DF	(Thailand) Ernesto Amantegui	0	0	0	0	0
14	FW	(Thailand) Teeratep Winothai	6	0	0	0	6
16	DF	(Thailand) Mika Chunuonsee	0	0	0	0	0
18	MF	(Thailand) Alexander Sieghart	0	0	0	0	0
19	MF	(Thailand) Oscar Kahl	0	0	0	0	0
20	MF	(North Macedonia) Mario Gjurovski	14	0	0	0	14
21	MF	(Thailand) Sasalak Haiprakhon	0	0	0	0	0
22	FW	(Bahrain) Jaycee John	4	0	0	1	5
23	DF	(Thailand) Sathaporn Daengsee	0	0	0	0	0
25	GK	(Thailand) Anusith Termmee	0	0	0	0	0
28	MF	(Thailand) Jakkit Wechpirom	0	0	0	0	0
29	MF	(Thailand) Sanrawat Dechmitr	3	0	0	0	3
31	DF	(Thailand) Sarayut Sompim	0	0	0	0	0
32	DF	(France) Yohan Tavares	0	0	0	0	0
33	GK	(Thailand) Takdanai Klomklieng	0	0	0	0	0
34	GK	(Thailand) Warut Mekmusik	0	0	0	0	0
35	DF	(Thailand) Siripong Kongjaopha	0	0	0	0	0
36	MF	(Thailand) Jedsadakorn Kowngam	0	0	0	0	0
37	MF	(Thailand) Wisarut Imura	0	0	0	0	0
38	DF	(Thailand) Worawut Sathaporn	0	0	0	0	0
39	MF	(Thailand) Pokklaw Anan	6	0	0	0	6
40	DF	(Thailand) Manuel Bihr	1	0	0	0	1
77	MF	(Thailand) Jakkapan Pornsai	0	0	0	0	0

== Transfers ==
The first Thai footballer's market was open between 14 December 2016, and 28 January 2017. The second Thai footballer's market was open between 3 June 2017, and 30 June 2017.

=== In ===
Date	Pos.	Name	From
8 November 2016	DF	(France) Yohan Tavares	(Portugal) Estoril
5 January 2017	MF	(Thailand) Oscar Kahl	(Sweden) Skövde AIK
6 January 2017	MF	(Thailand) Pokklaw Anan	(Thailand) Chonburi
6 February 2017	DF	(Thailand) Sathaporn Daengsee	(Thailand) Buriram United
6 February 2017	MF	(Thailand) Alexander Sieghart	(Thailand) Buriram United
5 June 2017	MF	(Iran) Mehrdad Pooladi	(Qatar) Al-Shahania
9 June 2017	MF	(Thailand) Jakkapan Pornsai	(Thailand) Bangkok Glass
19 July 2017	GK	(Thailand) Sumethee Khokpho	(Germany) Fortuna Düsseldorf

=== Out ===
Date	Pos.	Name	To
24 October 2016	FW	(Brazil) Leandro Tatu	(Thailand) PTT Rayong
1 December 2016	GK	(Thailand) Pisan Dorkmaikaew	(Thailand) Bangkok Glass
31 December 2016	FW	(Thailand) Chatchai Koompraya	(Thailand) Chainat Hornbill
31 December 2016	DF	(Thailand) Thritthi Nonsrichai	(Thailand) BEC Tero Sasana
31 December 2016	FW	(Thailand) Ronnachai Rangsiyo	(Thailand) Air Force Central
31 December 2016	MF	(Thailand) Pongsakon Seerot	(Thailand) Suphanburi
15 January 2017	DF	(Thailand) Amnat Suknoi	(Thailand) Songkhla United
28 January 2017	FW	(Thailand) Noraphat Kaikaew	(Thailand) Customs United
9 February 2017	DF	(Thailand) Senee Kaewnam	(Thailand) Navy

=== Loan out ===
Date from	Date to	Pos.	Name	To
27 January 2017	31 December 2017	DF	(Thailand) Prat Samakrat	(Thailand) Sukhothai
6 February 2017	31 December 2017	DF	(Thailand) Noppol Pitafai	(Thailand) Suphanburi
8 February 2017	31 December 2017	MF	(Thailand) Sansern Limwattana	(Thailand) Ubon UMT United
8 February 2017	31 December 2017	FW	(Thailand) Sompong Soleb	(Thailand) Ratchaburi Mitr Phol
11 July 2017	31 December 2017	MF	(Thailand) Jakkit Wechpirom	(Japan) FC Tokyo
