= 2016 Bangkok United F.C. season =

Bangkok United
2016 season
- Chairman: Kajorn Chearavanont
- Manager: Alexandré Pölking
- Stadium: Thammasat Stadium, Khlong Luang, Pathum Thani, Thailand
- Thai League: 2nd
- Thai FA Cup: Round of 64
- Thai League Cup: Quarter-finals
- Top goalscorer: League: Jaycee John (20); All: Jaycee John (22)
Home colours	Away colours	Third colours

The 2016 season is Bangkok United's 6th season in the Thai Premier League on 2009–2010 and since 2013, on the name of Bangkok United.

== Players ==
Note: Flags indicate national team as defined under FIFA eligibility rules; some limited exceptions apply. Players may hold more than one non-FIFA nationality.

No.	Pos.	Nation	Player
1	GK	THA	Kittipong Phuthawchueak
3	DF	THA	Thritti Nonsrichai
4	DF	THA	Panupong Wongsa (vice-captain)
5	DF	THA	Putthinan Wannasri
6	MF	THA	Anthony Ampaipitakwong
7	MF	MNE	Dragan Bošković
8	MF	THA	Wittaya Madlam (captain)
9	FW	THA	Ronnachai Rangsiyo
10	MF	THA	Chatchai Koompraya
11	MF	THA	Sumanya Purisai
13	DF	THA	Ernesto Amantegui
14	FW	THA	Teeratep Winothai
16	DF	THA	Mika Chunuonsee
17	MF	THA	Sansern Limwattana
20	MF	MKD	Mario Gjurovski
21	MF	MLI	Kalifa Cissé

No.	Pos.	Nation	Player
22	FW	BHR	Jaycee John
23	DF	THA	Senee Kaewnam
25	GK	THA	Anusith Termmee
27	DF	THA	Noppol Pitafai
28	FW	THA	Noraphat Kaikaew
29	MF	THA	Sanrawat Dechmitr
30	FW	BRA	Leandro Tatu
32	MF	THA	Ekkachai Sumrei
33	GK	THA	Takdanai Klomklieng
34	GK	THA	Warut Mekmusik
36	DF	THA	Jirayu Niemtisong
37	DF	THA	Kittinan Boonying
38	DF	THA	Worawut Sathaporn
39	MF	THA	Sasalak Haiprakhon
40	MF	THA	Jakkit Wechpirom

=== Out on loan ===
Note: Flags indicate national team as defined under FIFA eligibility rules; some limited exceptions apply. Players may hold more than one non-FIFA nationality.

No.	Pos.	Nation	Player
–	MF	THA	Pongsakorn Seerod (to Sukhothai)

== Foreign players ==
Note: Flags indicate national team as defined under FIFA eligibility rules; some limited exceptions apply. Players may hold more than one non-FIFA nationality.

No.	Pos.	Nation	Player
7	MF	MNE	Dragan Bošković
20	MF	MKD	Mario Gjurovski
21	MF	MLI	Kalifa Cissé
22	FW	BHR	Jaycee John
30	FW	BRA	Leandro Tatu

== Pre-season and friendlies ==
Date	Opponents	H / A	Result F–A	Scorer(s)
21 January 2016	Army United	N	4–1	Jaycee 34', Kaprálik 47' (o.g.), Norapat (2) 66', 88'
27 January 2016	(China) Hangzhou Greentown	H	0–0	
1 February 2016	(Malaysia) Pahang	H	4–1	Norapat 26' (pen.), Jaycee 55', Tatu 69', Mario 88'
6 February 2016	Ang Thong	A	2–0	Senee 21', Teeratep 80'
10 February 2016	(South Korea) Jeonnam Dragons	H	0–1	
13 February 2016	(South Korea) Busan IPark	H	1–0	Bošković 13' (pen.)
21 February 2016	Chiangmai	A	1–2	Jaycee 83'

== Thai League ==
Pos	Team	Pld	W	D	L	GF	GA	GD	Pts	Qualification or relegation
1	Muangthong United (C, Q)	31	26	2	3	73	24	+49	80	2017 AFC Champions League group stage
2	Bangkok United (Q)	31	23	6	2	71	36	+35	75	2017 AFC Champions League preliminary round 2
3	Bangkok Glass	31	18	3	10	62	41	+21	57	
4	Buriram United	30	15	10	5	55	38	+17	55	
5	Chonburi	31	14	9	8	52	33	+19	51	

Updated to match(es) played on 25 September 2016. Source: Thai League
Rules for classification: 1) points; 2) goal difference; 3) number of goals scored.
(C) Champions; (Q) Qualified for the phase indicated

Date	Opponents	H / A	Result F–A	Scorers	League position
6 March 2016	Buriram United	H	3–5	Dragan (3) 27', 67', 78' (pen.)	15th
9 March 2016	Pattaya United	A	2–1	Mika 45+2', Teeratep 82'	12th
12 March 2016	Osotspa M-150 Samut Prakan	H	1–1	Jaycee 84'	11th
16 March 2016	Army United	A	4–3	Mario (2) 51', 87', Jaycee 85', Dragan 90+1'	6th
30 March 2016	SCG Muangthong United	A	3–2	Sanrawat 4', Mario 78', Teeratep 87'	4th
2 April 2016	BBCU	H	1–0	Jaycee 18'	3rd
23 April 2016	Chainat Hornbill	A	2–1	Sanrawat 6', Dragan 58'	2nd
27 April 2016	BEC Tero Sasana	H	3–0	Sasalak 33', Mario (2) 79', 90+3'	1st
30 April 2016	Ratchaburi Mitr Phol	A	1–0	Mario 13'	1st
7 May 2016	Bangkok Glass	A	1–0	Jaycee 22'	1st
11 May 2016	Navy	A	0–1		2nd
14 May 2016	Nakhon Ratchasima Mazda	H	2–1	Dragan 11', Jaycee 35' (pen.)	2nd
22 May 2016	Sisaket	H	6–1	Jaycee (2) 9', 77', Dragan (2) 30', 69', Mario 64', Leandro 90'	2nd
28 May 2016	Chonburi	A	1–0	Mika 69'	2nd
12 June 2016	Chiangrai United	H	2–0	Sanrawat 14', Dragan 84'	2nd
18 June 2016	Suphanburi	A	1–0	Teeratep 21'	2nd
22 June 2016	Sukhothai	H	4–2	Sansern 14', Sanrawat 56', Dragan 75' (pen.), Sumanya 90+3'	2nd
26 June 2016	Buriram United	A	0–0		2nd
29 June 2016	Pattaya NNK United (Note: In mid-2016, Pattaya United change the name to Pattaya NNK United due to their take sponsor.)	H	1–1	Mario 15'	2nd
2 July 2016	Super Power Samut Prakan (Note: In mid-2016, Osotspa M-150 Samut Prakan change the name to Super Power Samut Prakan due to their take over.)	A	2–0	Dragan 85' (pen.), Mario 88'	2nd
10 July 2016	SCG Muangthong United	H	3–3	Jaycee 9', Dragan 62', Ekkachai 78'	2nd
17 July 2016	BBCU	A	4–2	Mika 25', Jaycee (3) 45+1', 67', 77'	2nd
20 July 2016	Chainat Hornbill	H	3–2	Macena 9', Jaycee 25', Dragan 56' (pen.)	2nd
23 July 2016	BEC Tero Sasana	A	3–2	Jaycee (3) 36', 54' (pen.), 75'	2nd
31 July 2016	Ratchaburi Mitr Phol	H	2–1	Jaycee 64', Mario 90+3'	2nd
6 August 2016	Bangkok Glass	H	4–2	Jaycee 5', Dragan 30' (pen.), Macena 76', Mario 90+3'	2nd
14 August 2016	Navy	H	3–1	Dragan (2) 15', 23', Macena 37'	2nd
20 August 2016	Nakhon Ratchasima Mazda	A	1–1	Jaycee 85'	2nd
11 September 2016	Sisaket	A	4–2	Jaycee (2) 7', 35', Jakkapong 53' (o.g.), Mario 74'	2nd
17 September 2016	Chonburi	H	1–1	Dragan 83'	2nd
24 September 2016	Chiangrai United	A	3–0	Dragan (2) 64', 87', Macena 78'	2nd

== Thai FA Cup ==
Chang FA Cup

Date	Opponents	H / A	Result F–A	Scorers	Round
15 June 2016	Nakhon Ratchasima Mazda	H	3–3 (a.e.t.) (4–5p)	Teeratep (2) 12', 59', Sasalak 30'	Round of 64

== Thai League Cup ==
Toyota League Cup

Date	Opponents	H / A	Result F–A	Scorers	Round
9 April 2016	Phuket	A	4–1	Noraphat (2) 16', 42', Jakkit 32', Chatchai 87'	Round of 64
8 June 2016	Ayutthaya Warrior	A	3–0	Thritti 10', Teeratep 37', Ronnachai 63'	Round of 32
6 July 2016	Tak City	A	2–1 (a.e.t.)	Jaycee 57' (pen.), Sumanya 107'	Round of 16
10 August 2016	Buriram United	H	3–3 (a.e.t.) (4–5p)	Macena 36', Teeratep 69' (pen.), Jaycee 110'	Quarter-finals

== Squad goals statistics ==
No.	Pos.	Name	League	FA Cup	League Cup	Total
1	GK	(Thailand) Kittipong Phuthawchueak	0	0	0	0
4	DF	(Thailand) Panupong Wongsa (vc)	0	0	0	0
5	DF	(Thailand) Putthinan Wannasri	0	0	0	0
6	MF	(Thailand) Anthony Ampaipitakwong	0	0	0	0
7	MF	(Montenegro) Dragan Bošković	19	0	0	19
8	MF	(Thailand) Wittaya Madlam (c)	0	0	0	0
9	FW	(Thailand) Ronnachai Rangsiyo	0	0	1	1
10	FW	(Brazil) Gilberto Macena	4	0	1	5
11	MF	(Thailand) Sumanya Purisai	1	0	1	2
13	DF	(Thailand) Ernesto Amantegui	0	0	0	0
14	FW	(Thailand) Teeratep Winothai	3	2	2	7
15	DF	(Thailand) Prat Samakrat	0	0	0	0
16	DF	(Thailand) Mika Chunuonsee	3	0	0	3
17	MF	(Thailand) Sansern Limwattana	1	0	0	1
20	MF	(North Macedonia) Mario Gjurovski	12	0	0	12
22	FW	(Bahrain) Jaycee John	20	0	2	22
23	FW	(Thailand) Senee Kaewnam	0	0	0	0
27	DF	(Thailand) Noppol Pitafai	0	0	0	0
29	MF	(Thailand) Sanrawat Dechmitr	4	0	0	4
30	FW	(Brazil) Leandro Tatu	1	0	0	1
32	MF	(Thailand) Ekkachai Sumrei	1	0	0	1
33	GK	(Thailand) Takdanai Klomklieng	0	0	0	0
34	GK	(Thailand) Warut Mekmusik	0	0	0	0
36	DF	(Thailand) Jirayu Niemtisong	0	0	0	0
37	DF	(Thailand) Kittinan Boonying	0	0	0	0
38	DF	(Thailand) Worawut Sathaporn	0	0	0	0
39	MF	(Thailand) Sasalak Haiprakhon	1	1	0	2
40	DF	(Thailand) Manuel Bihr	0	0	0	0
Out on loan
–	MF	(Thailand) Jakkit Wechpirom	0	0	1	1
–	MF	(Thailand) Chatchai Koompraya	0	0	1	1
–	DF	(Thailand) Thritthi Nonsrichai	0	0	1	1
Left club during season
–	MF	(Mali) Kalifa Cissé	0	0	0	0
–	GK	(Thailand) Anusith Termmee	0	0	0	0
–	FW	(Thailand) Noraphat Kaikaew	0	0	2	2

== Transfers ==
First Thai footballer's market is opening on 27 December 2015, to 28 January 2016
Second Thai footballer's market is opening on 3 June 2016, to 30 June 2016

=== In ===
Date	Pos.	Name	From
22 December 2015	MF	(Thailand) Sansern Limwattana	(Thailand) Buriram United
27 December 2015	DF	(Thailand) Ernesto Amantegui	(Thailand) Army United
5 January 2016	MF	(Thailand) Pongsakorn Sirod	(Thailand) TOT
5 January 2016	MF	(North Macedonia) Mario Gjurovski	(Thailand) SCG Muangthong United
24 January 2016	FW	(Thailand) Teerathep Winothai	(Thailand) Police United
6 June 2016	FW	(Brazil) Gilberto Macena	(Saudi Arabia) Al Qadisiyah
22 June 2016	DF	(Thailand) Prat Samakrat	(Thailand) Suphanburi
4 July 2016	DF	(Thailand) Manuel Bihr	(Germany) Stuttgarter Kickers

=== Out ===
Date	Pos.	Name	To
2 January 2015	FW	(France) Romain Gasmi	(Thailand) Chiangmai
6 January 2016	MF	(Thailand) Paitoon Nontadee	(Thailand) Suphanburi
14 June 2016	MF	(Mali) Kalifa Cissé	(Thailand) Bangkok Glass
28 June 2016	GK	(Thailand) Anusith Termmee	(Thailand) Bangkok Christian College
30 June 2016	FW	(Thailand) Noraphat Kaikaew	(Thailand) Nakhon Pathom United

=== Loan out ===
Date from	Date to	Pos.	Name	To
13 January 2016	31 December 2016	DF	(Thailand) Pollawat Pinkong	(Thailand) Osotspa M-150 Samut Prakan
13 February 2016	31 December 2016	MF	(Thailand) Pongsakorn Sirod	(Thailand) Sukhothai
2 June 2016	31 December 2016	MF	(Thailand) Chatchai Koompraya	(Thailand) Chainat Hornbill
2 June 2016	31 December 2016	MF	(Thailand) Jakkit Wechpirom	(Thailand) Chainat Hornbill
5 July 2016	31 December 2016	DF	(Thailand) Thritthi Nonsrichai	(Thailand) Suphanburi
