= Kaikaew =

Kaikaew (Thai: ไก่แก้ว) is a Thai surname. Notable people with the surname include:

- Noraphat Kaikaew (born 1990), Thai football player
- Pakin Kaikaew (born 1986), Thai football player
