= U-12 Junior Soccer World Challenge =

- Organiser(s): Amazing Sports Lab Japan, Tokyo Football Association (2013–2017); Osaka Football Association (2018–present)
- Founded: 2013; 13 years ago
- Region: Asia
- Teams: 16
- Current champions: (Spain) FC Barcelona (5th title)
- Most championships: (Spain) FC Barcelona (5 titles)
- Website: u12-juniorsoccer-wc.com

The U-12 Junior Soccer World Challenge (U-12ジュニアサッカーワールドチャレンジ) is an international club football tournament for under the age of 12 organized by Osaka Football Association.

== History ==
The first year of the tournament was in 2013. Twelve teams took place for four days, from 27 to 31 August. The final match was FC Barcelona against Liverpool FC, and FC Barcelona was the first year’s champion.

The second year of the tournament had more participants, in total, 16 teams took part. Not only Football club FC Barcelona and A.C. Milan, the 2 big European clubs took place, but also Asiop Apacinti from Indonesia came to the tournament. From Japan, some youth category teams from J-League’s club, and a small regional club came to play this tournament. The tournament was held from 28 to 31 August, and the winner was FC Barcelona.

The 3rd tournament in 2015 invited FC Barcelona and RCD Espanyol from Spain, Deportivo Camioneros from Argentine, and Vietnam U-12 from Asia. The tournament was held from 27th to 30 August. One of the semi-finals match was played between FC Barcelona and Tokyo U-12, and FC Barcelona, who was the champions for 2 consecutive years, was defeated by Tokyo U-12. The final was played between Tokyo U-12 and RCD Espanyol, after 90 min., the match has ended draw. And they ended up with the penalty shoot-out, finally, RCD Espanyol won the trophy.

== Regulations ==
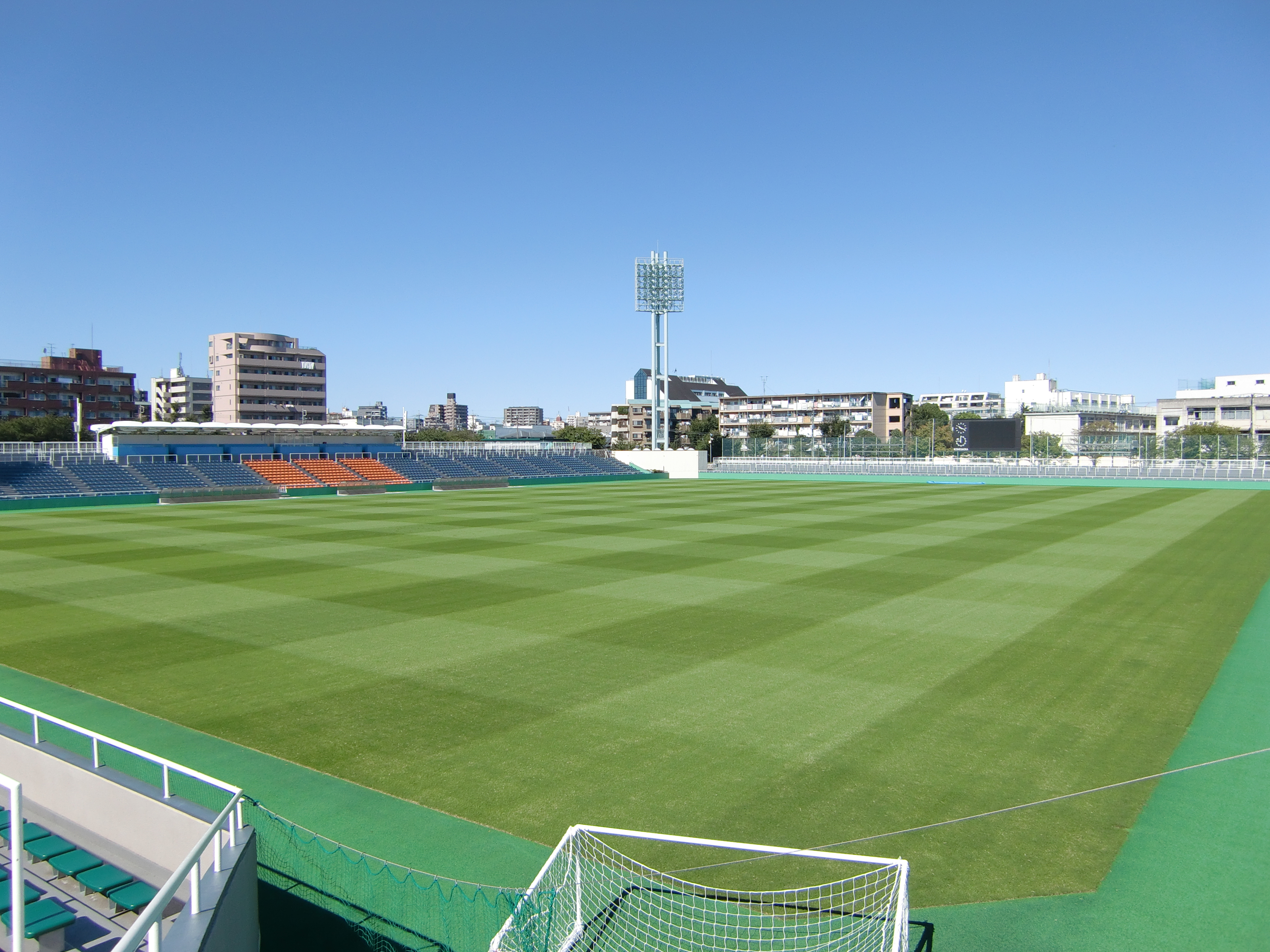
Nishigaoka Stadium is used in the final

- The tournament will be played in accordance with the regulations of Japan Football Association. (Regulations will be the new one)
- Match balls will be size 4.
- The tournament will be 11v11.
- The clubs play the group matches, and 8 best teams go to the play off. (Direct elimination)
- Every match will be made up of two halves of 25 minutes. With 5 minutes break. (During the playing periods include substitutions and drink water).
- The play off of the group matches will be 2 halves of 20 minutes.
- The semifinal, third place play off and final match´s break will be 10 min.
- In case of tied match, during the group matches will be finished as tied match, and play-off will play penalty kicks. (3 penalties)

== Qualifying round ==
Qualifying J-League youth academies has been carried out from 2016 because the clubs wish to participate in the tournament has increased. Six teams from 15 teams that participated in the East Japan qualifying and three teams from the seven teams that participated in the West Japan qualifying has competed in this 2016 tournament.

== Results ==
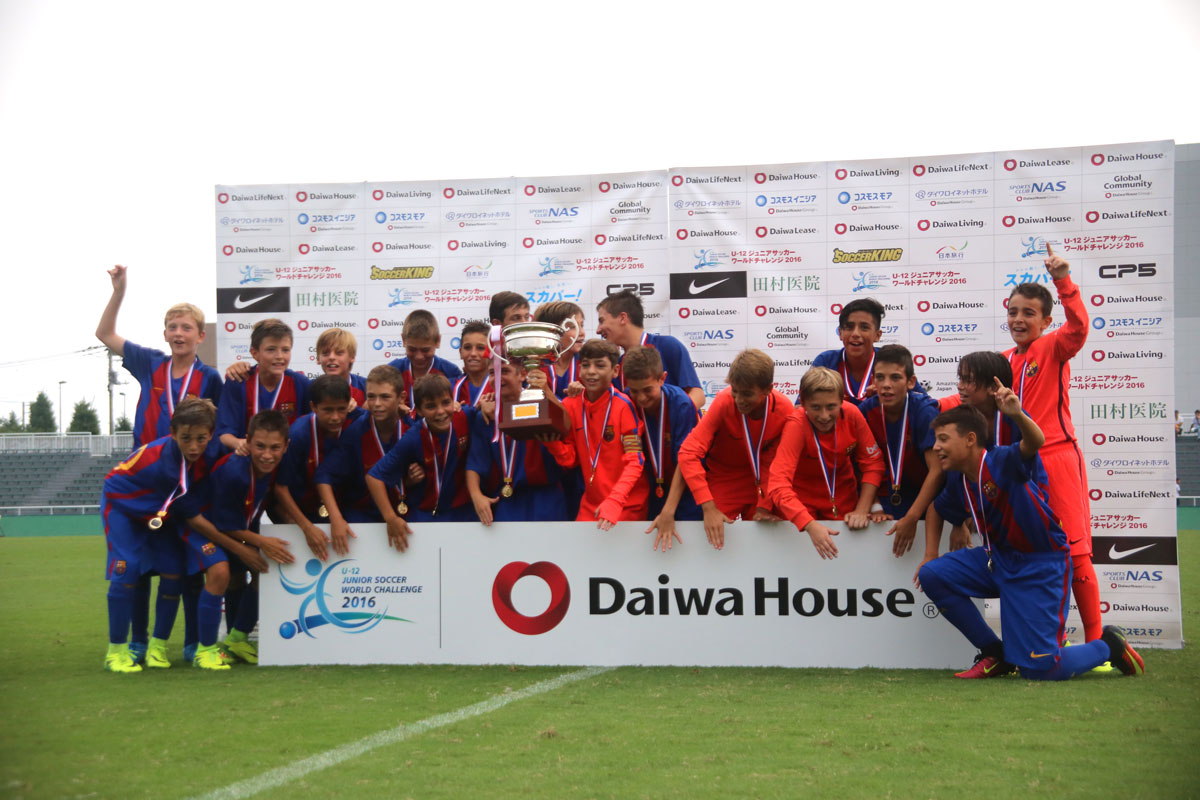
FC Barcelona won the tournament in 2016

Edition	Year	Winners	Score	Runners-up	Third place	Fourth place
1	2013	(Spain); FC Barcelona	5–0	(England); Liverpool FC	(Japan); Kashiwa Reysol U-12	(Japan); Tokyo Verdy Junior
2	2014	(Spain); FC Barcelona	2–0	(Japan); Tokyo U-12	(Japan); Kashiwa Reysol U-12	(Japan); Omiya Ardija Junior
3	2015	(Spain); RCD Espanyol	0–0 (2–1 p)	(Japan); Tokyo U-12	(Spain); FC Barcelona	(Vietnam); Viettel U-12
4	2016	(Spain); FC Barcelona	1–0	(Japan); Omiya Ardija Junior	(Japan); Tokyo Verdy Junior	(Japan); Kawasaki Frontale Junior
5	2017	(Spain); FC Barcelona	2–1	(Japan); Tokyo U-12	(Japan); Nagoya Grampus U-12	(Japan); Omiya Ardija Junior
6	2018	(Spain); FC Barcelona	3–1	(England); Arsenal F.C.	(Mexico); Club Tijuana	(Japan); JFA Training Center OSAKA U-12
7	2019	Nigeria Select	1–0	(China); Guangzhou R&F	Thailand U-12	(Japan); JFA Training Center OSAKA U-12

== Awards ==
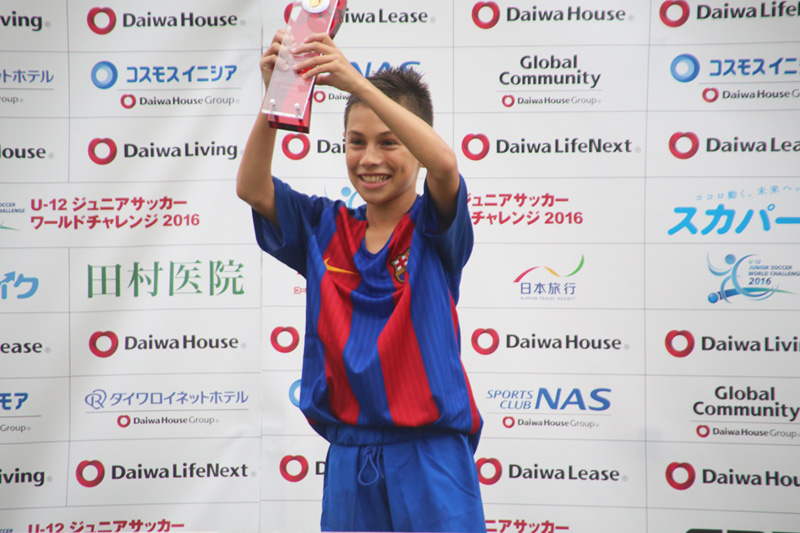
Adriá Capdevila Puigmal, 2016

=== Most valuable player ===
- 2013: Eric García ( (Spain) FC Barcelona)
- 2014: Pablo Moreno ( (Spain) FC Barcelona)
- 2015: Yuki Nagata ( (Japan) Tokyo U-12)
- 2016: Adriá Capdevila Puigmal ( (Spain) FC Barcelona)
- 2017: Marc Bombardo Poyato ( (Spain) FC Barcelona)
- 2018: Myles Lewis-Skelly ( (England) Arsenal F.C.)

=== Best scorer ===
- 2013: Ansu Fati ( (Spain) FC Barcelona), Paul Glatzel ( (England) Liverpool FC)
- 2014: Tomoya Osawa ( (Japan) Omiya Ardija Junior)
- 2015: Pelaz Ruiz Marc ( (Spain) FC Barcelona)
- 2016: Takumi Minamino ( (Japan) Gamba Osaka Junior)
- 2017: Kouhei Terasawa ( (Japan) Tokyo U-12), Yu Imanishi ( (Japan) Gamba Osaka Junior), Hisatsugu Ishii ( (Japan) Fukuyama Rosas Seleson)
- 2018: ( (Japan) Nagoya Grampus U-12)

== Participating teams from outside Japan ==
- 2013: (Spain) FC Barcelona, (England) Liverpool F.C., (Thailand) Chonburi F.C.
- 2014: (Spain) FC Barcelona, (Italy) A.C. Milan, (Indonesia) Asiop Apacinti
- 2015: (Spain) FC Barcelona, (Spain) RCD Espanyol, (Argentina) Deportivo Camioneros, (Vietnam) Viettel U-12
- 2016: (Spain) FC Barcelona, (England) Manchester City F.C.
- 2017: (Spain) FC Barcelona, (England) Arsenal F.C.
- 2018: (Spain) FC Barcelona, (England) Arsenal F.C., (Mexico) Club Tijuana, (China) Chinese Football Association Select, (China) R&F Soccer School Select
- 2019: (Spain) FC Barcelona, (Germany) FC Bayern München, Nigeria Select, (China) Guangzhou Evergrande, (China) Guangzhou R&F, (Australia) Mongo Football, (Singapore) Turf City, (ASEAN) SISB Thailand, Toyota Thailand

== Episodes ==
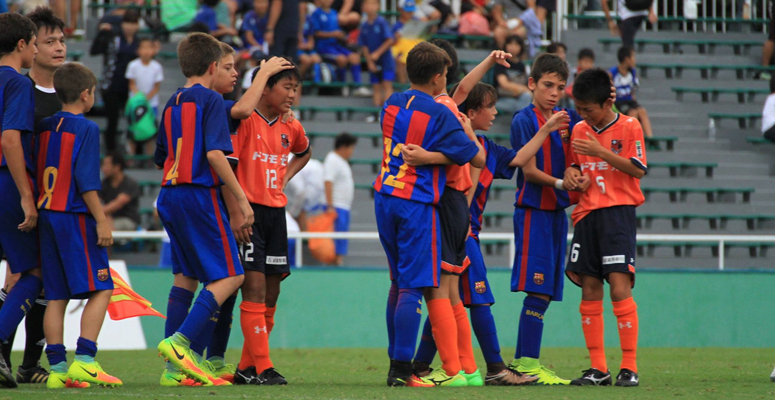
The boys of FC Barcelona showed sportsmanship

FC Barcelona’s Under 12 team won the 2016 tournament. After beating Omiya 1-0 in the final, The Catalan juniors showed some sportsmanship, taking time to console their distraught opponents. This situation was reported in many countries.

== Sponsorship ==
- Daiwa House (Special Sponsor)
- Daiwa House Next (Sponsor)
- Daiwa Living (Sponsor)
- Daiwa Lease (Sponsor)
- Cosmos Initia (Sponsor)
- Global Community (Sponsor)
- Daiwa Roynet Hotels (Sponsor)
- Sports Club NAS (Sponsor)
- Cosmos More (Sponsor)
- Nippon Travel Agency (Sub Sponsor)
- Nike, Inc. (Sub Sponsor)
- CP5 (Sub Sponsor)
- Japan Sports Promotion (Partner)
- Tokyo Verdy (Partner)
- SKY PerfecTV! (Media Partner)
