= Mika Chunuonsee =

Thai footballer

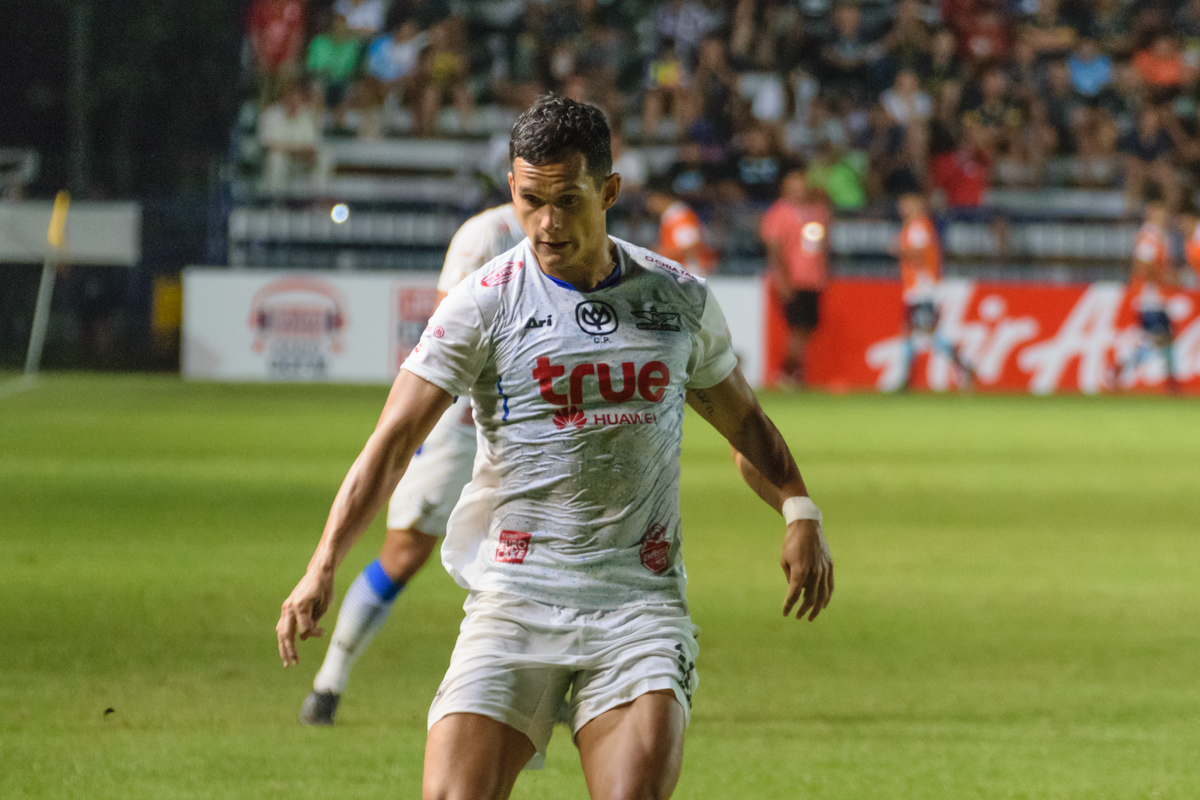
- Chunuonsee playing for Bangkok United in 2018

Personal information
- Full name: Mika Chunuonsee
- Date of birth: 26 March 1989 (age 37)
- Place of birth: Bridgend, Wales
- Height: 1.79 m (5 ft 10 in)
- Positions: Right-back; centre-back

Team information
- Current team: Samui United
- Number: 16

Youth career
- 2005–2007: Cardiff City

Senior career*
Years	Team	Apps	(Gls)
2007–2008	Bryntirion Athletic	22	(3)
2008	Neath Athletic	5	(0)
2008–2009	Afan Lido	8	(1)
2009–2010	Muangthong United	6	(0)
2010–2011	Suvarnabhumi Customs	23	(2)
2011–2012	BEC Tero Sasana	24	(0)
2012–2013	Bangkok	29	(1)
2013–2014	Suphanburi	29	(1)
2014–2022	Bangkok United	156	(11)
2023–2024	Lamphun Warriors	26	(1)
2025–	Samui United	4	(3)
Total		328	(20)

International career^{‡}
2005–2006	Wales U17	3	(0)
2015–2019	Thailand	7	(0)
- * Club domestic league appearances and goals as of 12:35, 21 April 2024 (UTC) ‡ National team caps and goals as of 20 January 2019

Mika Chunuonsee (Thai: มิก้า ชูนวลศรี; RTGS: Mika Chunuansi; born 26 March 1989) is a retired professional footballer who plays as a right-back or a centre-back. Born in Wales, he plays for the Thailand national team.

== Club career ==
Born in Bridgend, Wales, Chunuonsee spent two years as a scholar with Cardiff City before joining Bryntirion Athletic and then Neath Athletic. He joined Neath in June 2008 but departed the club in September 2008 to join Afan Lido. In January 2009 he scored his first goal for the club. In July 2009, he moved to Muangthong United.

== International career ==
Chunuonsee represented his country of birth Wales at Under 17 level in the UEFA Under 17 Elite Tournament in Cyprus for matches against Spain, Cyprus and Moldova March 2006. Other players involved in that squad were Senior Welsh Internationals Gareth Bale, Aaron Ramsey and Chris Gunter, whilst Eagles team-mates Kyle Graves, Daniel Lancey and Scott Evans were also involved.

In January 2015, Chunuonsee was called up by Kiatisuk Senamuang to play for Thailand in the 2015 King's Cup. He made the first appearance in the match against Honduras U-20 in King's Cup. However, it was not counted as the official senior cap for Thailand since the competitor was the youth team. A year later, On 3 June 2016, Chunuonsee made his official debut for Thailand national senior team in FIFA International A match after came off the bench at the 75th minute to replace Teerasil Dangda in 2016 King's Cup semi-finals against Syria. The game ended at 2–2 after ninety minutes. Chunuonsee contributed in the penalty shoot-out and helped Thailand to advance to the final. In 2018, he was called up by Thailand national team for the 2018 AFF Suzuki Cup. He was named for the final squad in 2019 AFC Asian Cup.

== Personal life ==
Chunuonsee was born in Bridgend, and moved to Ko Samui with his family when he was 1 year old. He later moved back to Wales when he was 10. His father is Thai from Surat Thani and his mother is Welsh.

In November 2019, Chunuonsee married Taya Rogers, a Thai-American actress and super model. The couple now have two children. One daughter, Mila, who was born in February 2021. One son, Jaden, born in December 2022.

== Statistics ==
As of 21 April 2024

Club	Season	League		Cup		League Cup		Continental		Other		Total	
Club	Season	Apps	Goals	Apps	Goals	Apps	Goals	Apps	Goals	Apps	Goals	Apps	Goals
Muangthong United	2009	6	0	0	0	—		—		—		6	0
Customs United	2010	23	2	1	0	0	0	—		—		24	2
BEC Tero Sasana	2011	24	0	2	0	6	0	—		—		32	0
Bangkok	2012	29	1	1	0	1	0	—		—		31	1
Suphanburi	2013	17	1	1	0	1	0	—		—		19	1
Suphanburi	2014	12	0	0	0	0	0	—		—		12	0
Bangkok United	2014	17	2	—		—		—		—		17	2
Bangkok United	2015	29	1	1	0	0	0	—		—		30	1
Bangkok United	2016	28	3	0	0	0	0	—		—		28	3
Bangkok United	2017	24	2	1	0	1	0	—		1	0	27	2
Bangkok United	2018	29	3	0	0	1	0	—		—		30	3
Bangkok United	2019	10	0	3	0	2	0	1	0	—		16	0
Bangkok United	2020	9	0	2	1	0	0	—		—		11	1
Bangkok United	2021–22	10	0	0	0	0	0	—		—		10	0
Bangkok United	2022–23	0	0	0	0	0	0	—		—		0	0
Lamphun Warriors	2022–23	8	0	0	0	0	0	—		—		8	0
Lamphun Warriors	2023–24	16	0	0	0	0	0	—		—		16	0
Total		291	15	12	1	12	0	1	0	1	0	317	16

== Honours ==
Muangthong United

- Thai Premier League: 2009

Thailand

- King's Cup: 2016
