= Sarayut Sompim =

Thai footballer (born 1997)

Personal information
- Full name: Sarayut Sompim
- Date of birth: 23 March 1997 (age 29)
- Place of birth: Buriram, Thailand
- Height: 1.80 m (5 ft 11 in)
- Position: Centre back

Team information
- Current team: Police Tero
- Number: 23

Youth career
- 2013–2015: Surasakmontree School

Senior career*
Years	Team	Apps	(Gls)
2016–2017	Bangkok United	3	(0)
2017–2021	Buriram United	5	(0)
2018	→ Air Force Central (loan)	15	(0)
2019	→ PTT Rayong (loan)	11	(0)
2020–2021	→ Suphanburi (loan)	5	(0)
2021–2022	Samut Prakan City	22	(0)
2023	Nakhon Si United	1	(0)
2023–2024	Tiffy Army	23	(1)
2024–	Police Tero	42	(1)

International career
2015–2016	Thailand U19	9	(0)
2017–2018	Thailand U21	3	(0)
2019–2020	Thailand U23	8	(1)
- * Club domestic league appearances and goals as of 18 May 2026

Sarayut Sompim (Thai: ศรายุทธ สมพิมพ์, born 23 March 1997) is a Thai professional footballer who plays as a defender for Thai League 2 club Police Tero.

== Honours ==
=== International ===
Thailand U-19

- AFF U-19 Youth Championship
  - Winners (1) : 2015

Thailand U-23

- 2019 AFF U-22 Youth Championship: Runner up
