= Surasakmontree School =

School in Bangkok, Thailand

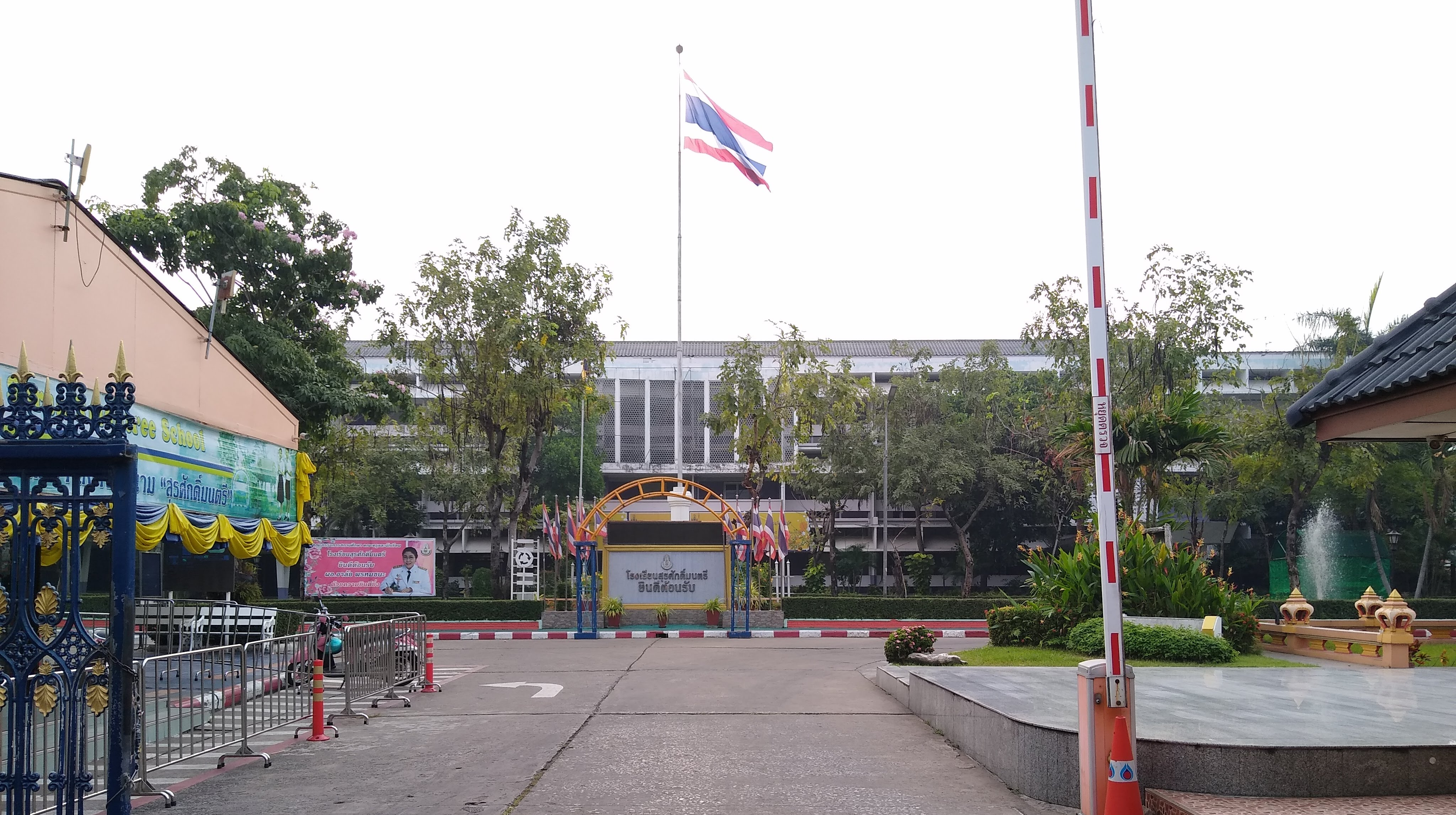

Surasakmontree School (Thai: โรงเรียนสุรศักดิ์มนตรี) is a Government School in Bangkok, Thailand.

== History ==
On 25 July 1949, Field Marshal Phin Choonhavan, as Deputy Commander in Chief of the Royal Thai Army, collected money and funds to establish an Army school for children. On 7 September 1966, Field Marshal Prapart Jarustain, as Commander in Chief of the Royal Thai Army, authorized General Tem Homsetthi to open the school. In May 1968, the school gates opened and enrolled around 600 students - including children who were not from an Army family. The school started with grades 7-9.

- Grade 7: 11 rooms, with 40 people per room
- Grade 8: 2 rooms, with 40 people per room
- Grade 9: 2 rooms, with 40 people per room

(1969, the school accepted more students and covered grades 5-10. The following year, the school enrolled students from kindergarten to 11th grade.

(1971 the founders established Children's Army Commercial College. The program began with Advertising. In the subsequent year, they added Electrical Mechanics, Radio Technician and Mechanics. The college's name was then changed to Children's Army Vocational Training School.

On 18 March 1974, the school transferred to the Ministry of Education which split the school into two locations. These new institutions came to be known as Rajamangala University of Technology, Tawan-ok, situated on 4.3 acres of land, and Surasakmontree School (the name of the first Commander in Chief of the Royal Thai Army).

== Programs ==
The Surasakmontree Scho(Junior High School) has Gifted Education Programs and a Normal Program.

At the Senior High School level, the school has 7 programs ⎯ Gifted Education, Intensive English, Science-Math, English-Math, English-French, English-German, English-Chinese Program and Thai-Social.

== Colors ==
The Surasakmontree School's main colours are Yellow and Blue. Yellow represents manner and merit, which the school hopes to instill in their students. Blue is a portrayal of the bravery, intelligence and forbearance of the student body and faculty.

== Symbol ==
Motto: Save, Hard-working, Endure, Harmonize, with Discipline.

Brand: Crown, sceptre, sword and group of Cassia javanica flowers. This is the symbol of the Thai army, which indicates that the Surasakmontree School is an army school for children. The halo and wheel of the brand refers to the light of intellect depicting a place that teaches all the right values and virtue to children.

Tree: Cassia javanica

== Flower ==
The school flower is Cassia fistula, also known as Golden Shower (ชัยพฤกษ์)

== Athletics ==
Surasakmontree is known for its student football/futsal team and was known for its volleyball enthusiasts and team.

=== Football ===
The school's competitive football team was founded c. 2000 when the School's Director Thammarong Phrainimit made a suggestion to the Physical Education teacher Sakol Kliengprasert. Sakol, who had 17 years' experience in coaching students football at Ratwinit Bangkaeo School before transferring to Surasakmontree, oversaw the team's development from scratch and as its Head Coach. By 2010, Surasakmontree School had become one of the leading teams in Secondary School football.

The team won multiple National Youth Football and Futsal competitions, including the Department of Physical Education Championships, the Thailand Prime Minister Cup, the Air Force Commander's Cup and the Channel 7 Champion Cup. The school competed in the 2017 Thailand Amateur League under the name Tokio BlueArmy and signed partnership agreements with Thai League clubs Bangkok United (2013–2015) and Police Tero (since 2018). Past members include Junior National Team players Jakkit Wachpirom and Sasalak Haiprakhon.

== Band ==
Surasakmontree's marching band is known for its competitive performance. The band has won national awards:

- Military Band Contest award (1998, 1999)
- Star Division and Championship Division, World Music Contest year 14 in Kerkrade, Netherlands (2001).
- Marching Display, Championship Division (2005)
- Prize Trophy (the Brass Band got the highest score in that day) at the World Music Contest
- Champion in the Show Band Corps Style Class in the World Division. World Music Contest (2009)
- Champion in the Drum battle, Thailand International Marching contest (2010)
- Champion in the Drum Battle, Thailand International Marching contest 2011.
- Champion in the Show Band Corps Style Class in the world division and Gold medal with Distinction and Day Prize trophy (2013).
- 2nd Runner up in the Thailand International Marching Band Festival (2013).
- Winner in the Thailand Drumline Contest for Solo Standing (Thai:ประเภทยืนตีกลอง) in the Senior Division (2013).
