= Senee Kaewnam =

Thai footballer (born 1986)

Personal information
- Full name: Senee Kaewnam
- Date of birth: 5 September 1986 (age 40)
- Place of birth: Roi Et, Thailand
- Height: 1.75 m (5 ft 9 in)
- Position: Right back

Senior career*
Years	Team	Apps	(Gls)
2012	Samut Songkhram	21	(1)
2013	Ratchaburi Mitr Phol	2	(0)
2013	Army United	12	(0)
2014	BEC Tero Sasana	0	(0)
2014–2016	Bangkok United	7	(0)
2017–2018	Navy	4	(0)
- * Club domestic league appearances and goals as of 2 November 2014

Senee Kaewnam (Thai: เสนีย์ แก้วนาม, born 5 September 1986), or simply known as Say (Thai: เส), is a Thai professional footballer who plays as a right back for Thai League 1 club Navy.
