= Wittaya Madlam =

Thai footballer (born 1985)

Personal information
- Full name: Wittaya Madlam
- Date of birth: 6 October 1985 (age 41)
- Place of birth: Songkhla, Thailand
- Height: 1.78 m (5 ft 10 in)
- Position: Defensive midfielder

Youth career
- 2001–2003: Wat Suthiwararam School
- 2004–2005: Customs Department

Senior career*
Years	Team	Apps	(Gls)
2006–2008	Customs Department	39	(4)
2009–2017	Bangkok United	225	(3)
2018–2019	BG Pathum United	2	(0)
2018	→ Nakhon Ratchasima (loan)	0	(0)
2019	Chonburi	6	(0)
2020	MOF Customs United	10	(0)
Total		282	(7)

International career
2015	Thailand	2	(0)
- * Club domestic league appearances and goals

Wittaya Madlam (Thai: วิทยา หมัดหลำ, born 6 October 1985), simply known as Ya (Thai: ยา), is a Thai retired professional footballer who plays as a defensive midfielder.

== International career ==
In March, 2015 Wittaya debuted for Thailand in a friendly match against the Singapore.

=== International ===
As of 12 November 2015

National team	Year	Apps	Goals
Thailand	2015	2	0
Thailand	Total	2	0
