= Chatchai Koompraya =

Thai footballer (born 1984)

Personal information
- Full name: Chatchai Koompraya
- Date of birth: 3 April 1984 (age 42)
- Place of birth: Suphan Buri, Thailand
- Height: 1.71 m (5 ft 7 in)
- Position: Midfielder

Youth career
- Suphanburi

Senior career*
Years	Team	Apps	(Gls)
2005–2010	Suphanburi		
2011–2016	Bangkok United	45	(1)
2016	→ Chainat Hornbill (loan)		
2017–2022	Chainat Hornbill	106	(4)
- * Club domestic league appearances and goals

Chatchai Koompraya (Thai: ฉัตรชัย คุ้มพญา, born April 3, 1984), or simply known as Chai (Thai: ชัย), is a Thai professional footballer who plays as a midfielder.
