= Thritthi Nonsrichai =

Thai footballer (born 1983)

Personal information
- Full name: Thritthi Nonsrichai
- Date of birth: 13 March 1983 (age 43)
- Place of birth: Bangkok, Thailand
- Height: 1.81 m (5 ft 11 1/2 in)
- Positions: Centre-back; right back

Youth career
- 2000–2001: Bangkok Christian College

Senior career*
Years	Team	Apps	(Gls)
2002	Bangkok Christian College	15	(0)
2003–2010	BEC Tero Sasana	141	(6)
2010–2012	Bangkok Glass	31	(0)
2012–2013	Muangthong United	2	(0)
2013–2016	Bangkok United	35	(0)
2016	→ Suphanburi (loan)	9	(1)
2017	BEC Tero Sasana	6	(0)
Total		239	(7)

International career
2000	Thailand U17		
2006	Thailand U23		
- * Club domestic league appearances and goals

Thritthi Nonsrichai (Thai: ธฤติ โนนศรีชัย, born March 13, 1983, in Bangkok), simply known as Doy (Thai: ดอย), is a Thai retired professional footballer who plays as a centre-back.

== Honours ==
=== Clubs ===
Muangthong United

- Thai Premier League: 2012
