= Noppol Pitafai =

Thai footballer (born 1985)

Personal information
- Full name: Noppol Pitafai
- Date of birth: 1 February 1985 (age 41)
- Place of birth: Roi Et, Thailand
- Height: 1.72 m (5 ft 7 1/2 in)
- Position: Left back

Youth career
- 2003–2004: BEC Tero Sasana

Senior career*
| Years | Team | Apps | (Gls) |
| 2005–2007 | BEC Tero Sasana | 33 | (4) |
| 2008 | TTM Phichit | 25 | (2) |
| 2009–2010 | BEC Tero Sasana | 47 | (2) |
| 2010–2012 | Bangkok Glass | 22 | (0) |
| 2013–2014 | Chainat Hornbill | 38 | (0) |
| 2014 | → Bangkok United (loan) | 15 | (0) |
| 2015–2018 | Bangkok United | 47 | (0) |
| 2017–2018 | → Suphanburi (loan) | 42 | (0) |
| 2019–2021 | Police Tero | 26 | (0) |
| 2021–2022 | Pattaya Dolphins United | 4 | (0) |
| 2023 | Ratchaburi | 0 | (0) |
| Total | | 299 | (8) |

International career
| 2005–2007 | Thailand U23 | | |
| 2006–2013 | Thailand | 3 | (0) |
Medal record
Thailand under-23
Sea Games
| Gold medal – first place | Sea Games 2005 | Football |
| Gold medal – first place | Sea Games 2007 | Football |
- * Club domestic league appearances and goals

Noppol Pitafai (Thai: นพพล ปิตะฝ่าย, born January 2, 1985) is a Thai former professional footballer who plays as a left back.

== International career ==
Pitafai played for the Thailand national football team in 2006 under Thai coach Charnwit Polcheewin. In 2013, he was called up to the national team by Surachai Jaturapattarapong to the 2015 AFC Asian Cup qualification. In October 2013 he came in as a substitute against Bahrain in a friendly match.

=== International ===
As of 12 November 2015

| National team | Year | Apps | Goals |
|---|---|---|---|
| Thailand | 2013 | 3 | 0 |
| Thailand | Total | 3 | 0 |

== Honours ==
=== Thailand U23 ===
- Sea Games
  - Gold medal (2) : 2005, 2007
