= Noraphat Kaikaew =

Thai footballer

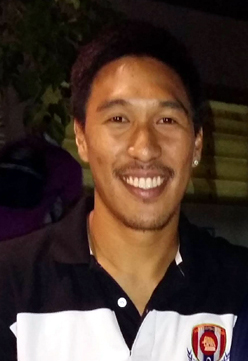

Personal information
- Full name: Noraphat Kaikaew
- Date of birth: 19 June 1990 (age 36)
- Place of birth: Bangkok, Thailand
- Height: 1.80 m (5 ft 11 in)
- Position: Forward

Team information
- Current team: Sukhothai
- Number: 28

Youth career
- 2009: Bangkok United

Senior career*
Years	Team	Apps	(Gls)
2010–2016	Bangkok United	5	(0)
2011–2012	→ Chamchuri United (loan)	19	(5)
2015	→ BBCU (loan)	14	(2)
2017	Customs United	17	(4)
2018	Angthong	8	(0)
2018	Navy	5	(0)
2019–	Sukhothai	3	(0)
- * Club domestic league appearances and goals

Noraphat Kaikaew (Thai : นรภัทร ไก่แก้ว); born 19 June 1990), is a Thai professional footballer. In his career he plays as a striker. He also has one son, and his name is Wasanphat bunyawit. Where he wants to be a professional footballer just like his father.
