= Anusit Termmee =

Thai footballer

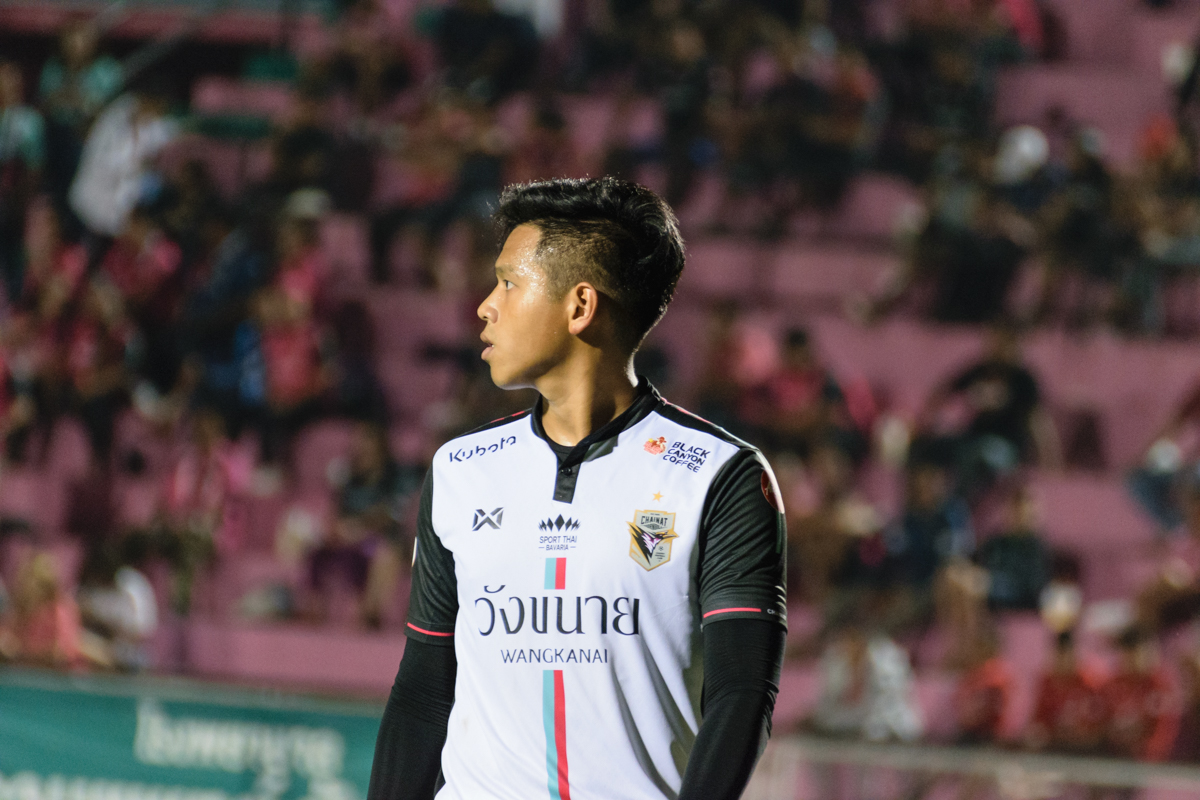

Personal information
- Full name: Anusit Termmee
- Date of birth: 19 January 1995 (age 31)
- Place of birth: Bangkok, Thailand
- Height: 1.83 m (6 ft 0 in)
- Position: Goalkeeper

Team information
- Current team: Nakhon Si United
- Number: 13

Youth career
- 2010–2012: Bangkok Christian College

Senior career*
Years	Team	Apps	(Gls)
2013–2020	Bangkok United	2	(0)
2015	→ Thai Honda (loan)	3	(0)
2018	→ Chainat Hornbill (loan)	7	(0)
2020–2021	Rayong	15	(0)
2021–2022	Samut Prakan City	0	(0)
2022	Kasetsart	9	(0)
2023–2024	Ayuthhaya United	3	(0)
2024–2025	Samut Sakhon City	13	(0)
2025–	Nakhon Si United	20	(0)

International career
2013–2014	Thailand U19	4	(0)
2015–2018	Thailand U23	3	(0)
Medal record
Thailand under-23
Sea Games
Gold medal – first place	Sea Games 2017	Football
- * Club domestic league appearances and goals as of 28 February 2026

Anusit Termmee (Thai: อนุศิษฏ์ เติมมี, born 19 January 1995) is a Thai professional footballer who plays as a goalkeeper for Nakhon Si United in Thai League 2.

== Honours ==
=== International ===
Thailand U-23

- Sea Games Gold Medal (1); 2017
- Dubai Cup (1) : 2017

Thailand U-21

- Nations Cup (1): 2016
