= Mario Gjurovski =

Macedonian football manager

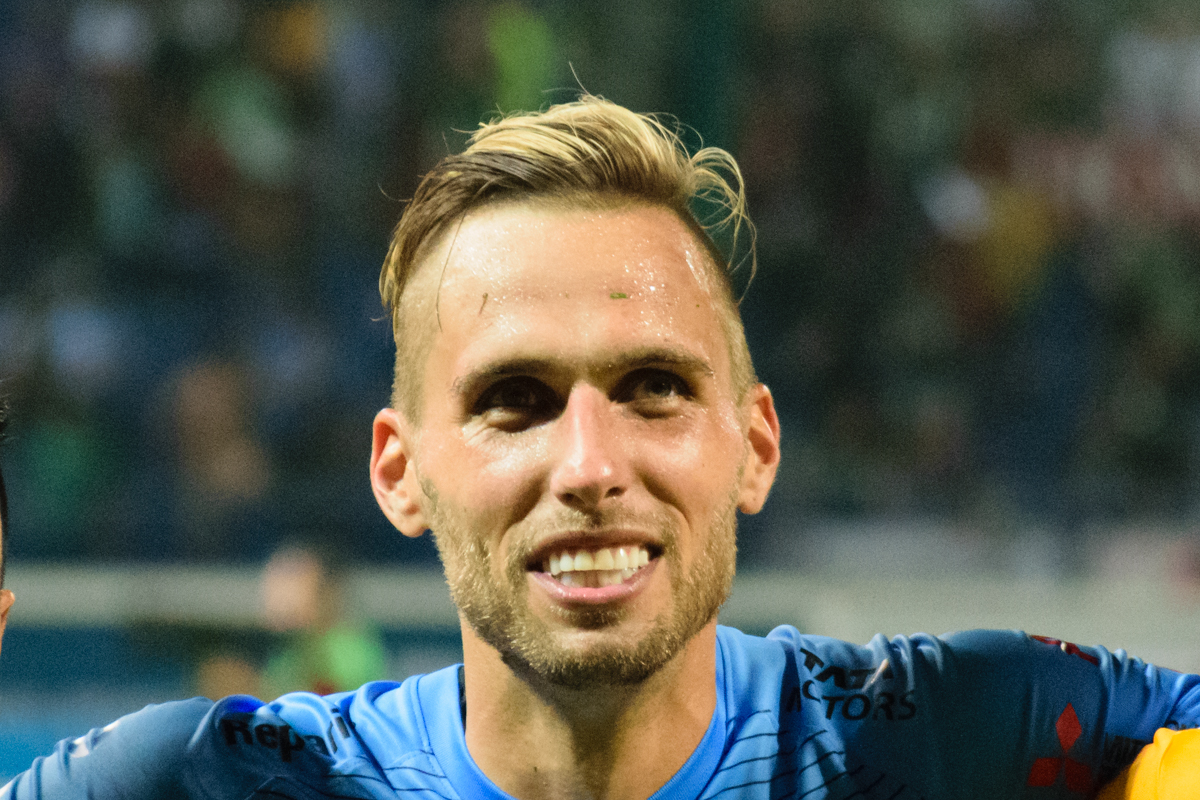
- Gjurovski in 2018

Personal information
- Date of birth: 11 December 1985 (age 40)
- Place of birth: Belgrade, SR Serbia, Yugoslavia
- Height: 1.80 m (5 ft 11 in)
- Position: Attacking midfielder

Youth career
- Red Star Belgrade

Senior career*
Years	Team	Apps	(Gls)
2003–2004	Red Star Belgrade	0	(0)
2003	→ Mladenovac (loan)	12	(0)
2004	→ Sopot (loan)	14	(3)
2004–2007	Bežanija	83	(18)
2007–2010	Vojvodina	56	(7)
2011–2012	Metalurh Donetsk	7	(0)
2012–2015	Muangthong United	121	(59)
2016–2017	Bangkok United	57	(29)
2018	Bangkok Glass	14	(4)
2018–2019	Muangthong United	5	(1)
Total		369	(121)

International career
2010–2011	Macedonia	12	(2)

Managerial career
- 2020–2023: Muangthong United
- * Club domestic league appearances and goals

Mario Gjurovski (Macedonian: Марио Ѓуровски, Serbian: Марио Ђуровски / Mario Đurovski; born 11 December 1985) is a Macedonian football manager and former player who played as a midfielder.

== Playing career ==
=== Club ===
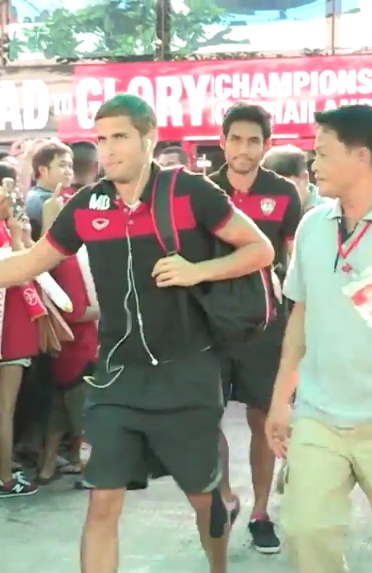
Mario with Muangthong United in 2013

Gjurovski played in the youth team of Čukarički, before moving to Red Star Belgrade. He spent the entire 2003–04 season on loan, first with Mladenovac and then with Red Star's satellite club Sopot, both of them playing in the Serbian League Belgrade.

In summer 2004, he signed with Bežanija playing in the Second League of Serbia and Montenegro. After two seasons the club achieved promotion in 2006 into the newly formed Serbian SuperLiga. In summer 2007 Gjurovski leaves Bežanija after having played over 80 league matches with them and having scored 18 goals, and signs with another SuperLiga club Vojvodina. After having initially limited chances, after a couple of seasons he became a standard player in the club. They archived finishing second in the 2008–09 season, and becoming 2009–10 Serbian Cup runners-up after losing the final against his former club Red Star, by 0–3. Gjurovski left Vojvodina during the winter break of the 2010–11 season after having played over 50 league matches in 3 1/2 years.

==== Ukrainia ====
On 1 March 2011, Gjurovski signed a 3-year deal with Ukrainian Premier League side Metalurh Donetsk.

==== Thailand ====
In 2012, he moved to Muangthong United from Thailand Premier League. Gjurovski played under Slaviša Jokanović coaching and helped Muangthong United to win the invincible domestic title in his first season in Thailand. Gjurovski scored a goal for Muangthong United and 1–3 lost against Buriram in 2015 Thai FA Cup final. It was the last match of him under Maungthong United shirt.

In May 2013, Gjurovski gained notoriety when after scoring a goal, he took his shorts off and put them on his head, revealing his tight grey briefs. He received a second yellow card and got sent off.

Despite the four successful seasons at Muangthong United, he rejected to renew the contract with Muangthong and moved to Bangkok United in 2016 on a free transfer.

On 21 November 2018, Gjurovski signed a contract with Muangthong United.

On 10 January 2020, Gjurovski has announced his retirement from football at the age of 34 after a seven-year in the Thai League.

=== International ===
He made his senior debut for Macedonia in a May 2010 friendly match against Azerbaijan in which he immediately scored his first international goal and has earned a total of 12 caps, scoring 2 goals. His final international was a November 2011 friendly against Albania.

== Managerial career ==
=== Muangthong United ===
On 19 October 2020, Gjurovski was appointed as the new head coach of Thai giant Muangthong United. On 18 September 2023, Gjurovski announced his resignation from managing Muangthong United to take responsibility for a performance that did not go as expected.

== Personal life ==
He is the son of former Macedonian international striker Milko Djurovski who previously played for Red Star Belgrade, Partizan and Groningen, and nephew of Boško Gjurovski, who also represented North Macedonia and Yugoslavia internationally.

The correct spelling of his last name is Gjurovski, as it appears in his Macedonian passport.

== Career statistics ==
=== Club ===
As of 22 June 2019

Club	Season	League		Cups		Continental		Total	
Club	Season	Apps	Goals	Apps	Goals	Apps	Goals	Apps	Goals
Muangthong United	2012	31	14	5	1	0	0	36	15
Muangthong United	2013	30	12	4	3	5	1	39	16
Muangthong United	2014	26	13	5	3	2	2	33	18
Muangthong United	2015	31	20	5	3	0	0	36	23
Bangkok United	2016	29	12	0	0	0	0	29	12
Bangkok United	2017	28	17	6	0	1	0	35	17
Bangkok Glass	2018	14	4	1	0	0	0	15	4
Muangthong United	2019	5	1	0	0	0	0	5	1
Total		0	0	0	0	0	0	0	0

=== International goals ===
Date	Venue	Opponent	Score	Goals	Competition
29 May 2010	Bischofshofen, Austria	Azerbaijan	3–1	88'	Friendly
7 September 2010	Skopje, Republic of Macedonia	Armenia	2–2	42'	Euro 2012 Qualifying

== Managerial statistics ==
As of match played 16 September 2023

Managerial record by team and tenure
Team	From	To	Record								Ref
Team	From	To	G	W	D	L	GF	GA	GD	Win %	Ref
Muangthong United	19 October 2020	16 September 2023	99	46	23	30	182	128	+54	46.46	
Total			99	46	23	30	182	128	+54	46.46	

== Honours ==
=== Player ===
Muangthong United

- Thai Premier League: 2012
