= Jaycee John Okwunwanne =

Nigerian footballer (born 1985)

Jaycee John
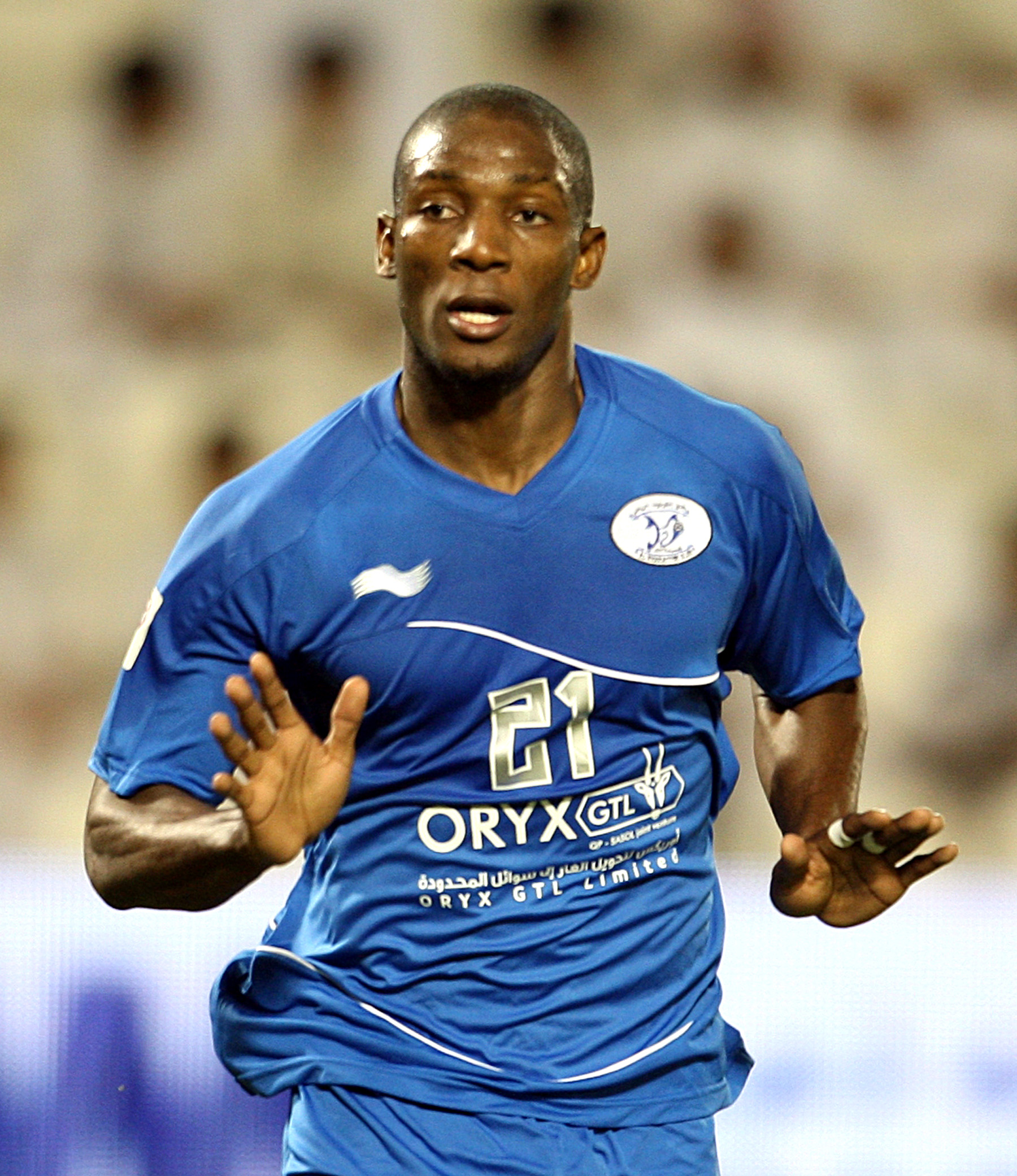
- Jaycee John with Al Kharaitiyat in 2011

Personal information
- Full name: Jaycee John Okwunwanne
- Date of birth: October 8, 1985 (age 41)
- Place of birth: Lagos, Nigeria
- Height: 1.81 m (5 ft 11 in)
- Position: Striker

Youth career
- 2000–2004: Osaka Lagos

Senior career*
Years	Team	Apps	(Gls)
2004–2006	Al-Ahli	25	(23)
2006–2008	Muharraq	30	(29)
2008–2009	Mouscron	47	(12)
2010	Eskişehirspor	21	(4)
2011	Al Jahra	14	(6)
2011–2014	Al Kharitiyat	48	(17)
2014–2015	Al-Mesaimeer	15	(19)
2015–2018	Bangkok United	48	(33)
2018	Air Force United	14	(2)
2019	Felda United	2	(0)
2019	Bangkok United	7	(0)
2020	Khon Kaen United	13	(2)
2020–2021	Chonburi	11	(3)

International career^{‡}
2006–2016	Bahrain	49	(14)
- * Club domestic league appearances and goals as of 17:00, 26 June 2019 (UTC) ‡ National team caps and goals as of 7 October 2016

Jaycee John "JoJo" Okwunwanne (born 8 October 1985) is a former professional footballer played as a striker. Born in Nigeria, he represented Bahrain at international level.

He started his youth career with Osaka Lagos and was coached by Nigerian exinternational Kingsley Osakwe. A globetrotter, Thailand is the seventh country Okwunwanne has played in.

== Career ==
Okwunwanne grew up in Lagos, Nigeria, and played for Osaka Lagos. Aged 19, he moved to Bahrain. After a strong fifth season in Bahrain, he went to Belgium to play for Excelsior Mouscron in the top division where he played a solid role.

In December 2009, he became a free agent after his club R.E. Mouscron went into bankruptcy and had to release their players. He went over to sign a one-year contract in Turkey with Eskisehirspor in the Süper Lig.

In January 2011, he transferred to the Kuwaiti Premier League team Al Jahra. Then he joined Qatari club Al Kharitiyat. In 2015, he joined Thai club Bangkok United after spells for Al Kharitiyat and Al-Mesaimeer.

== International goals ==
Scores and results list Bahrain's goal tally first.

No	Date	Venue	Opponent	Score	Result	Competition
1.	27 June 2007	Petaling Jaya Stadium, Petaling Jaya, Malaysia	United Arab Emirates	2–2	2–2	Friendly
2.	30 June 2007	Mỹ Đình National Stadium, Hanoi, Vietnam	Vietnam	3–3	3–5	Friendly
3.	4 October 2007	Bahrain National Stadium, Riffa, Bahrain	Singapore	1–0	3–1	Friendly
4.	4 October 2007	Bahrain National Stadium, Riffa, Bahrain	Singapore	2–0	3–1	Friendly
5.	4 October 2007	Bahrain National Stadium, Riffa, Bahrain	Singapore	3–0	3–1	Friendly
6.	21 October 2007	Bahrain National Stadium, Riffa, Bahrain	Malaysia	3–0	4–1	2010 FIFA World Cup qualification
7.	23 March 2009	Bahrain National Stadium, Riffa, Bahrain	Zimbabwe	3–0	5–2	Friendly
8.	9 September 2009	King Fahd International Stadium, Riyadh, Saudi Arabia	Saudi Arabia	1–1	2–2	2010 FIFA World Cup qualification
9.	29 November 2012	Saoud bin Abdulrahman Stadium, Al Wakrah, Qatar	Palestine	2–0	2–0	Friendly
10.	9 December 2012	Ali Sabah Al-Salem Stadium, Al Farwaniyah, Kuwait	Yemen	1–0	1–0	2012 WAFF Championship
11.	15 December 2012	Ali Sabah Al-Salem Stadium, Al Farwaniyah, Kuwait	Saudi Arabia	1–0	1–0	2012 WAFF Championship
12.	15 January 2015	Canberra Stadium, Canberra, Australia	United Arab Emirates	1–1	1–2	2015 AFC Asian Cup
13.	7 October 2016	Philippine Stadium, Bocaue, Philippines	Philippines	1–0	3–1	Friendly
14.	7 October 2016	Philippine Stadium, Bocaue, Philippines	Philippines	2–0	3–1	Friendly
