= Sasalak Haiprakhon =

Thai footballer (born 1996)

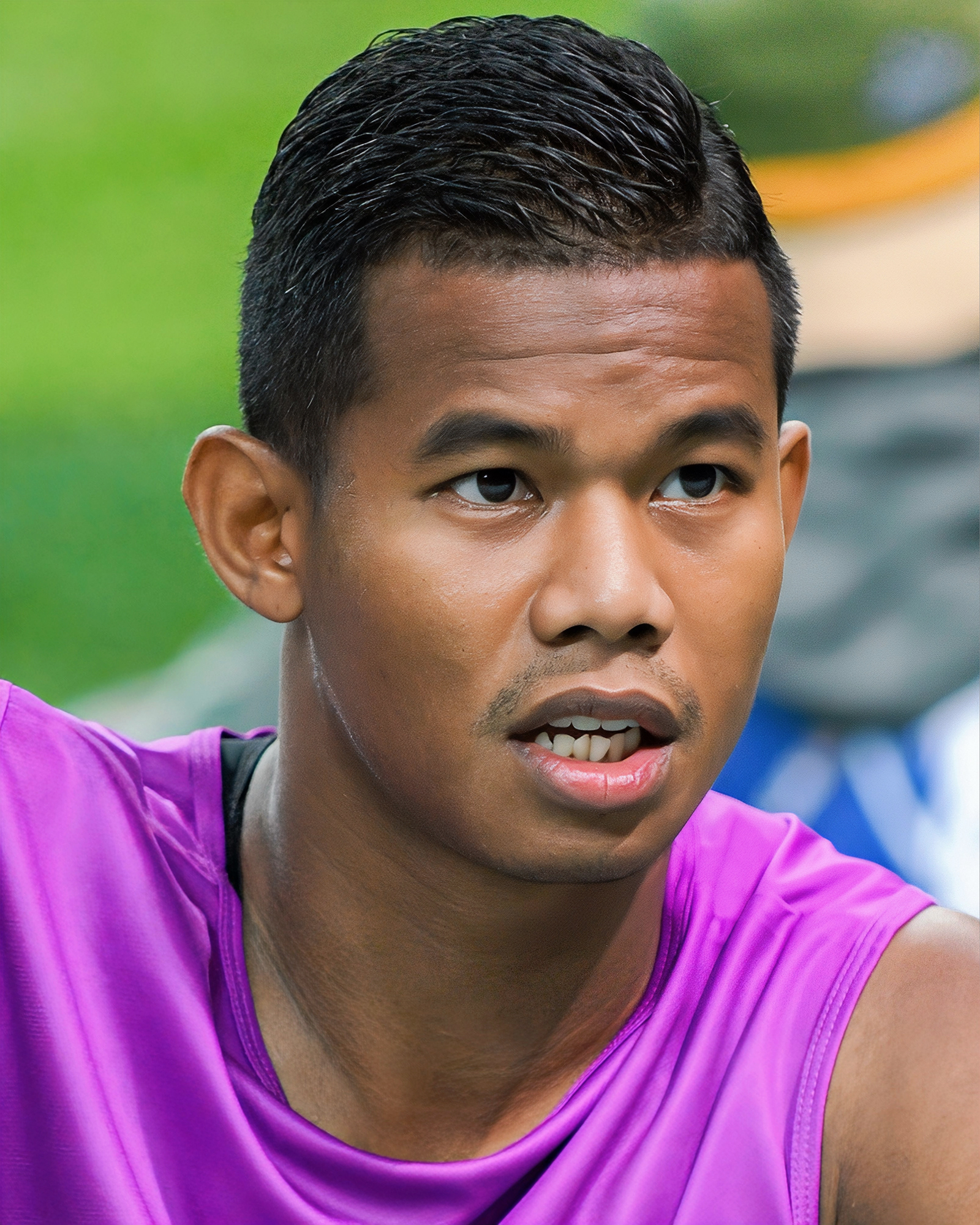
- Sasalak in 2025

Personal information
- Full name: Sasalak Haiprakhon
- Date of birth: 8 January 1996 (age 30)
- Place of birth: Prakhon Chai, Buriram, Thailand
- Height: 1.70 m (5 ft 7 in)
- Positions: Left-back; winger

Team information
- Current team: Buriram United
- Number: 2

Youth career
- 2012–2014: Surasakmontree School

Senior career*
Years	Team	Apps	(Gls)
2014–2017	Bangkok United	13	(1)
2017	→ Buriram United (loan)	9	(0)
2017–	Buriram United	175	(6)
2021	→ Jeonbuk Hyundai Motors (loan)	2	(0)

International career^{‡}
2016	Thailand U21	2	(1)
2017	Thailand U23	12	(1)
2018–	Thailand	26	(0)
Medal record
Thailand under-23
Sea Games
Gold medal – first place	Sea Games 2017	Football
Thailand
Asean Football Championship
Winner	AFF Mitsubishi Electric Cup 2022	2022
- * Club domestic league appearances and goals as of 17 October 2024 ‡ National team caps and goals as of 14 October 2024

Sasalak Haiprakhon (Thai: ศศลักษณ์ ไหประโคน, born 8 January 1996) is a Thai professional footballer who plays as a left-back or a winger for Buriram United and the Thailand national team.

== Career ==
On 23 June 2021, Sasalak joined Korean K League 1 side, Jeonbuk Hyundai Motors on loan till the end of the season.

== Targeted for racism ==
Sasalak was subjected to racial abuse from three Ulsan Hyundai players on social media. This event led to significant controversy and criticism from fans in the Southeast Asia region. On 12 June 2023, Park Yong-woo and Lee Kyu-seong called their teammate, Lee Myung-jae 'Sasalak' or 'ASEAN Quota' because of Lee's dark skin.

Ulsan Hyundai has officially apologized for the racist comments made by their players on Instagram towards Sasalak and promised to prevent a recurrence from happening again in the club. It will conduct training to eliminate all forms of discrimination against racism and thoroughly investigate the incident upon further disciplinary action. On 29 June 2023, The K League Disciplinary Committee announced a one-league match suspension and a fine of 15 million won.

== International career ==
In 2018 he was called up by Thailand national team for the 2018 AFF Suzuki Cup.

== Honours ==
=== Club ===
Buriram United

- Thai League 1 : 2017, 2018, 2021–22, 2022–23, 2023–24, 2024–25
- Thai FA Cup : 2021–22, 2022–23, 2024–25
- Thai League Cup : 2021–22, 2022–23, 2024–25
- Thailand Champions Cup: 2019
- ASEAN Club Championship: 2024–25

Jeonbuk Hyundai Motors

- K League 1: 2021

=== International ===
Thailand

- AFF Championship (1): 2022
- King's Cup: 2024

Thailand U23

- Sea Games Gold Medal: 2017
- Dubai Cup: 2017

=== Individual ===
- AFF Championship Best XI: 2022

2025–26

- Thai League 1 Team of the Season: 2025–26
