= Teeratep Winothai =

Thai footballer (born 1985)

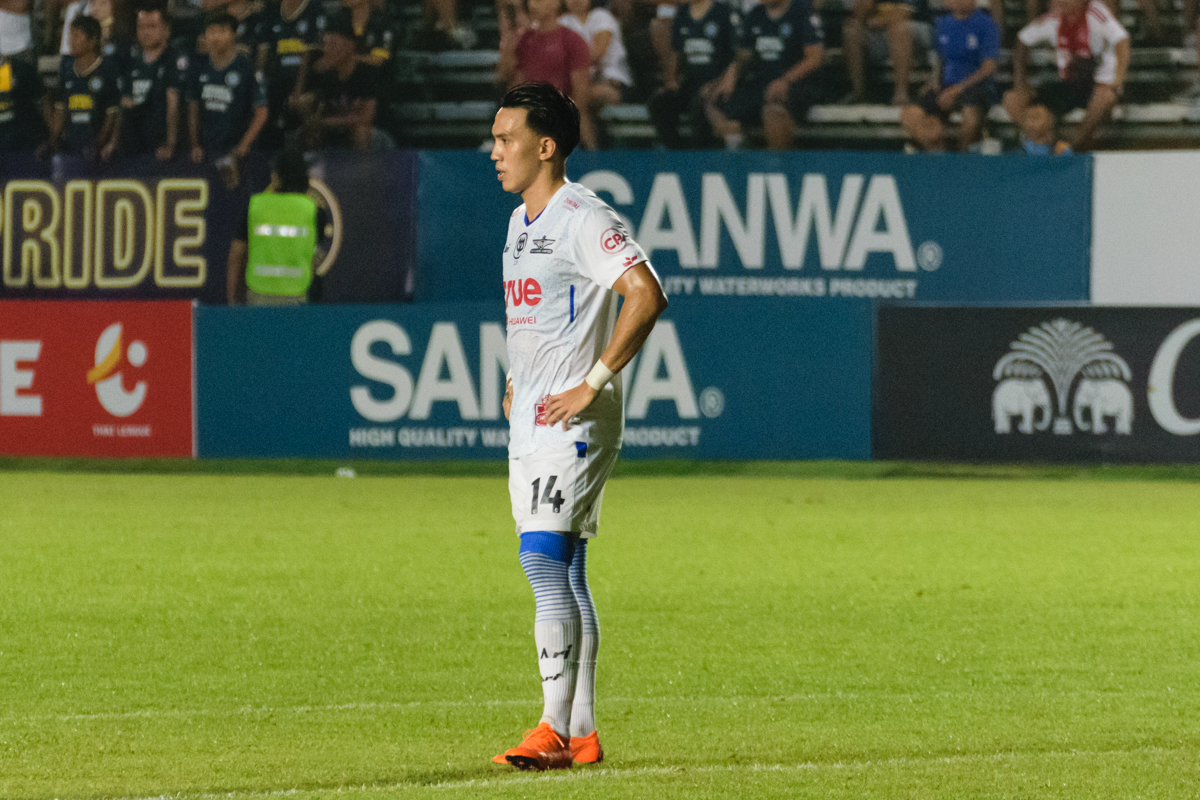
- Teeratep in 2018

Personal information
- Full name: Teeratep Winothai
- Date of birth: 16 February 1985 (age 41)
- Place of birth: Bangkok, Thailand
- Height: 1.72 m (5 ft 7 1/2 in)
- Position: Forward

Youth career
- 2001–2002: Bangkok Christian College
- 2002–2004: Crystal Palace
- 2005–2006: Everton

Senior career*
Years	Team	Apps	(Gls)
2006–2008	BEC Tero Sasana	65	(22)
2008–2010	Lierse	6	(3)
2009–2010	→ Muangthong United (loan)	33	(8)
2010	→ BEC Tero Sasana (loan)	8	(3)
2011	BEC Tero Sasana	15	(9)
2012–2014	Bangkok Glass	69	(19)
2014–2015	Police United	43	(11)
2016–2019	Bangkok United	83	(23)
2019	→ Chonburi (loan)	13	(2)
2020–2022	Chonburi	11	(0)
2021–2022	→ Police Tero (loan)	41	(5)
2022	Police Tero	11	(1)
2024	Roi Et PB United	1	(1)
Total		399	(107)

International career^{‡}
1998–2001	Thailand U17	8	(0)
2001–2004	Thailand U20	14	(11)
2001–2007	Thailand U23	16	(9)
2005–2022	Thailand	48	(16)
Medal record
Thailand under-23
Southeast Asian Games
Gold medal – first place	Sea Games 2001	Football
Gold medal – first place	Sea Games 2003	Football
Gold medal – first place	Sea Games 2005	Football
Gold medal – first place	Sea Games 2007	Football
Thailand
Asean Football Championship
Runner-up	AFF Suzuki Cup 2008	2008
- * Club domestic league appearances and goals as of 13:56, 9 November 2024 (UTC) ‡ National team caps and goals as of 14 December 2022

Teeratep Winothai (Thai: ธีรเทพ วิโนทัย, born 16 February 1985), simply known as Leesaw (Thai: ลีซอ) is a Thai retired footballer who played as a forward. He previously spent his youth career with England's Crystal Palace and Everton.

He got a bachelor's degree from the Faculty of Education from Chulalongkorn University.

== Club career ==
=== Youth career ===
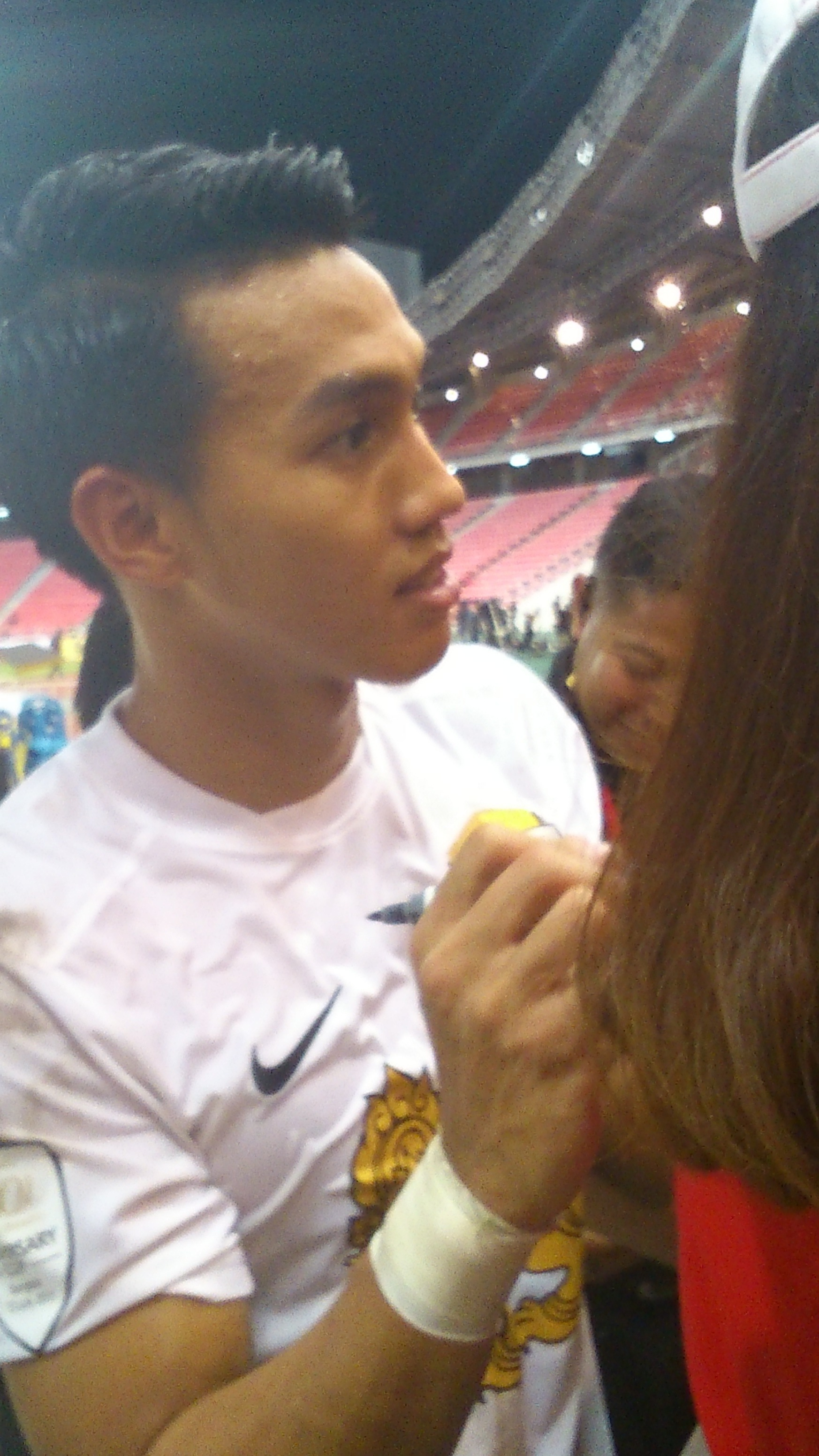
Teeratep Winothai after the game Singh All Star with Manchester United in 2013

He studied at Brentwood School, a private school in Brentwood, Essex, UK. During this time he represented the Thai national team at schoolboy level as well as being on the books of London-based club Crystal Palace. His performances for his school helped them reach the final of the 2001 Independent Schools FA Cup, scoring 8 goals in 4 games along the way. He eventually moved to Everton for one year before returning to Thailand.

=== Senior career ===
The young forward joined Thai Premier League side BEC Tero Sasana in 2006 aged 21 and played for the club until 2008 made totally 65 appearances scored 22 goals and won the 2008 Striker of the Year award.

In 2009, a Belgian side Lierse S.K. signed the Thai star with an undisclosed deal. However, Leesaw spent most of his time with the new club in reserve team and made only 8 appearances with 1 goal. Later in the first season with the Belgian club, he was moved back to Thailand and played for Thai Premier League champions Muangthong United on a loan deal.

Teeratep made 23 appearances and scored 4 goals before spending the rest of his loan spell with his former club, BEC Tero Sasana, in the same season and made 8 appearances with 3 goals. Leesaw eventually rejoined BEC Tero Sasana, leading to 15 appearances and 3 goals from the injury suffer in 2010–2011 season. In early 2012, Teeratep was on the move again to 2010–2011 Thai Premier League 4th place club, Bangkok Glass.

In 2013 Teeratep played against Manchester United in a TPL All-Stars team. He scored the winning goal, beating United in David Moyes' first match in charge, during their pre-season tour.

=== Police United ===
Teeratep joined Police United in 2014, but club relegation from Thai Premier League In 2015 meant Teeratep would play for Police United in Thai Division 1 League. Teerathep's first goal of the season was against PTT Rayong at PTT Stadium in a match Police United won 2–1. On 17 October 2015 Teeratep scored his first hattrick of the season against PTT Rayong at Boonyachinda Stadium the team went on to win 6–0. At the end of the season Police United were promoted to the Thai Premier League.

=== Bangkok United ===
On 24 January 2016, Winothai joined Bangkok United.

=== Chonburi FC ===
On 26 June 2019, Winothai joined Chonburi on loan from Bangkok United. He scored his first goal for Chonburi in match against PTT Rayong.

=== Retirement ===
Teeratep officially announced his retirement from professional football on 28 November 2022. After he led his team, Police Tero to win against Nakhon Ratchasima by scoring the winning goal in the penalty spot for the team to collect 3 points as the final match by ending his football career at 96 goals in the Thai League 1.

== International career ==
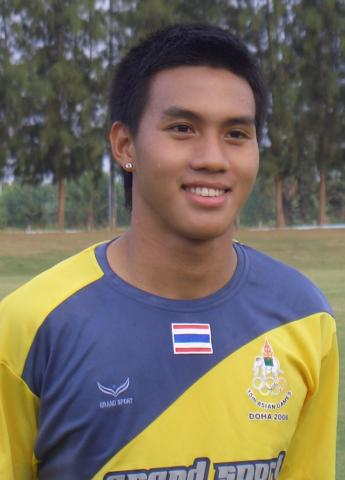
Winothai with Thailand in 2006

Teeratep has been included in the national team setup since a very young age and is a very versatile player, playing either on the wing or as a striker. Teeratep first came to the fore in the King's Cup in 2005 and has been a squad regular since, only being rested when called up to represent the nation in Olympic qualifying matches or in SEA Games. He represented Thailand in the 1999 FIFA U-17 World Championship in New Zealand. In the final of the 2005 SEA Games match against Vietnam, he scored a hat-trick and helped Thailand claim the gold medal for the 7th consecutive time.

Teeratep has been called up to new coach Peter Reid's first squad selection, to play in the T&T Cup 2008 hosted by Vietnam. Teeratep was a member of the victorious T&T Cup 2008 winning squad.

On 6 March 2014, he played for Thailand against Lebanon in the 2015 AFC Asian Cup qualification, and scored a goal.

Football Association of Thailand held a retirement farewell match on 14 December 2022, in honor of Teerathep, who has been a member of the Thai national team since he was 14 years old and has played for them at every level. His performance in the first half, which lasted 30 minutes, resulted in a 1–0 loss for the Thai national football team versus the Chinese Taipei squad.

== Style of play ==
Teeratep is known for his pace and work rate. Teeratep originally played as a striker, but could also play as a left winger or a right winger.

== International goals ==
Scores and results list Thailand's goal tally first.

#	Date	Venue	Opponent	Score	Result	Competition
1.	26 March 2006	Chon Buri Stadium, Thailand	Philippines	2–0	5–0	Friendly
2.	26 March 2006	Chon Buri Stadium, Thailand	Philippines	3–0	5–0	Friendly
3.	8 October 2007	Suphachalasai Stadium, Thailand	Macau	4–1	6–1	2010 FIFA World Cup Qualification
4.	6 February 2008	Saitama Stadium 2002, Japan	Japan	1–1	1–4	2010 FIFA World Cup Qualification
5.	15 March 2008	Kunming Tuodong Sports Center, China	China	1–1	3–3	Friendly
6.	15 March 2008	Kunming Tuodong Sports Center, China	China	2–1	3–3	Friendly
7.	20 May 2008	Rajamangala Stadium, Thailand	Nepal	5–0	7–0	Friendly
8.	20 May 2008	Rajamangala Stadium, Thailand	Nepal	7–0	7–0	Friendly
9.	25 May 2008	Rajamangala Stadium, Thailand	Iraq	1–0	2–1	Friendly
10.	2 June 2008	Rajamangala Stadium, Thailand	Bahrain	2–2	2–3	2010 FIFA World Cup Qualification
11.	20 December 2008	Rajamangala Stadium, Thailand	Indonesia	1–1	2–1	2008 AFF Suzuki Cup
12.	18 July 2009	SCG Stadium, Thailand	Pakistan	4–0	4–0	Friendly
13.	8 September 2010	Ambedkar Stadium, India	India	1–0	2–1	Friendly
14.	26 January 2013	700th Anniversary Stadium, Thailand	North Korea	1–0	2–2	2013 King's Cup
15.	5 March 2014	Rajamangala Stadium, Thailand	Lebanon	1–3	2–5	2015 AFC Asian Cup qualification
16.	14 July 2017	Rajamangala Stadium, Thailand	North Korea	3–0	3–0	2017 King's Cup

== Honours ==
=== Club ===
Muangthong United

- Thai Premier League (1): 2009

Police United

- Thai Division 1 League (1): 2015

=== International ===
Thailand U-20

- AFF U-19 Youth Championship (1): 2002

Thailand U-23

- Sea Games Gold medal (4): 2001, 2003, 2005, 2007

Thailand

- T&T Cup (1): 2008
- King's Cup (1): 2017

=== Individual ===
- Thai Premier League Striker of the Year (1): 2008
- Thai Premier League Player of the Month (1): September 2013
