= Bangkok United F.C. =

Association football club in Thailand

Bangkok United
- Full name: True Bangkok United Football Club สโมสรฟุตบอลทรู แบงค็อก ยูไนเต็ด
- Nicknames: Bangkok Angels (แข้งเทพ)
- Short name: BUFC
- Founded: 1988; 38 years ago as Bangkok University Football Club; 2009; 17 years ago as Bangkok United
- Ground: True BG Stadium; Pathum Thani, Thailand
- Capacity: 15,114
- Owner: True Corporation
- Chairman: Kachorn Chiaravanont
- Head coach: Danny Invincibile (Interim)
- League: Thai League 1
- 2025–26: Thai League 1, 5th of 16
- Website: www.truebangkokunitedfc.com
Home colours	Away colours	Third colours

Bangkok United Football Club (Thai: สโมสรฟุตบอลทรู แบงค็อก ยูไนเต็ด) (currently known as True Bangkok United due to sponsorship reasons) is a professional football club based in Pathum Thani province, Thailand.

Known as Bangkok University Football Club until 2009, the club was relegated from the 2010 Thai Premier League only four years after winning their first league title in 2006. In 2012, they were promoted to Thai League 1, after finishing third in the 2012 Thai Division 1 League. The club has won one Thai League 1 title, one Thai League 2 title and one Thailand Champions Cup in their history.

== History ==
=== Origins of the club (1988–2008) ===
The club was originally formed as Bangkok University in 1988 as a team for students at Bangkok University's Rangsit Campus in Pathum Thani province, just north of Bangkok, the club have gone from provincial football, and winning university-level titles, to being a professionally run outfit in the top flight in the Thai Premier League.

Bangkok University used the Bangkok University Stadium for domestic competitions until the end of the 2008 Thailand Premier League season. The stadium was based on the Bangkok University's Rangsit Campus and had a capacity of 5,000, currently used by the club as a training ground.

==== An era of titles ====
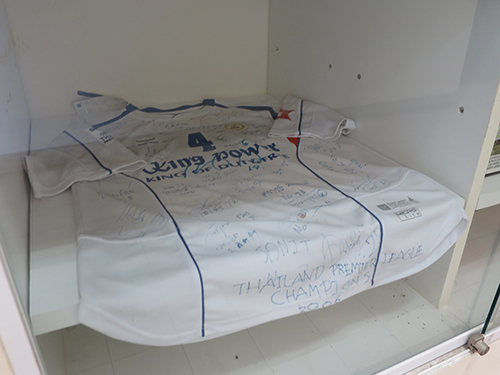
Bangkok University Shirt with sign of champions squads in 2006

Along the way to the top flight, the club won the Thai Division 1 League in 2003 and even captured the 2006 Thailand Premier League title against the odds, which has also enabled the club to taste life in the AFC Champions League.

The club appeared in the 2007 AFC Champions League but played their home matches in the group stage away from the club's home. The first match on 7 March 2007 against Korea's Chunnam Dragons was played at the Thai-Japanese Stadium in Bangkok and the second, on 25 April against Indonesia's Arema Malang, was played at the Thai Army Sports Stadium in Bangkok, where tickets cost 50 baht. Both matches ended 0–0. The third, against Japan's Kawasaki Frontale, was played at the Thai Army Sports Stadium. The team failed to qualify for the next stage.

=== Development of club's name (2009) ===
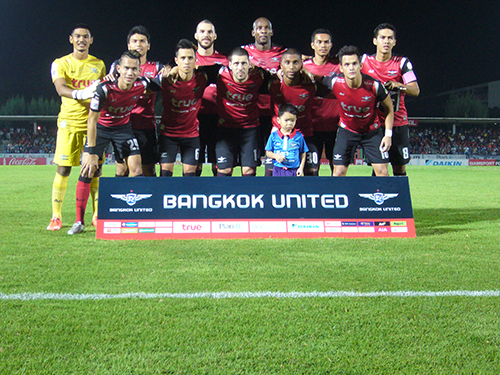
Bangkok United in 2015 ahead of the match against Muangthong United

At the start of the 2009 season, the club changed their club name from Bangkok University to Bangkok United with a partnership with the Bangkok Metropolitan Administration (BMA) to be in line with the Football Association of Thailand's (FAT) new regulations that all teams in the top flight must be registered as limited companies. They also changed their club nickname to 'Bangkok Angels', and were officially unveiled on 4 March 2009.

Also, with this name change, the club relocated to a new stadium, the Thai-Japanese Stadium which was based in Greater Bangkok. The stadium is multi-use, such as for athletics and football, and has a capacity of 10,320. The stadium was also shared by Thai Port whilst they waited for their stadium to be upgraded. On 31 May 2009, after five home matches, the club returned to using Bangkok University Stadium as a home ground again until the renovations of Thai-Japanese Stadium were finished before the start of the 2009 season's second leg in August.

Bangkok United narrowly escaped relegation in the 2009 Thai Premier League.

=== Resurgence and relegation (2010–2014) ===
In the 2010 Thai Premier League season, Bangkok United was backed by Thai media company True Corporation. The early season optimism did not last long and the 2010 campaign ended in relegation. Bangkok United only won two home games all season. Surprisingly, the two victories were against high-fliers Buriram PEA and Chonburi. Both victories were achieved at the Bangkok University Stadium after they switched their home fixtures from the Thai-Japanese Stadium to the university midway through the season.

Bangkok United played in the 2011 Thai Division 1 League and finished in sixth place in the league.

Bangkok United ended the 2012 Thai Division 1 League in third place, and were promoted back to the top flight in the 2013 season after spending two seasons in the second division.

=== Rise to prominence (2015–present) ===
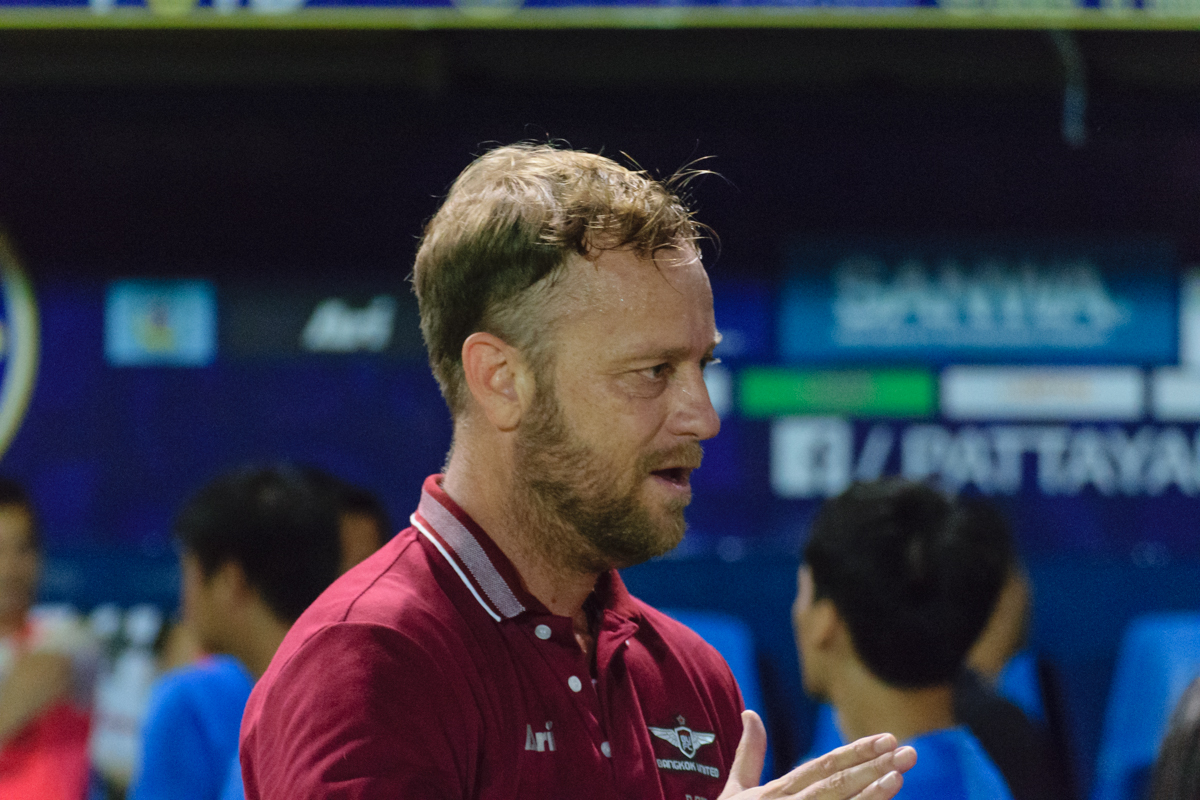
Alexandré Pölking made history with the team by claiming 75 points – the club's highest points in a single season

In the 2015 season, Bangkok United moved to the Thammasat Stadium to pass the assignment of AFC Champions League stadium regulation. Brazilian head coach Alexandré Pölking improved the club during the season before to finish fifth in the Thai Premier League. Since 2015, the club became one of big clubs in Thailand league. The team under Pölking has been widely praised for instilling an energetic play with a galivanting style of attacking football reaching levels of intensity that are rarely seen in this league.

Entering the 2016 season, Bangkok United ended in second place in the Thai League 1 and created history by claiming 75 points, the club's highest points in a single season. The team missed an opportunity to qualify for the 2016 AFC Champions League by failing to beat Malaysian club Johor Darul Ta'zim in the qualifying play-offs match.

In the 2017 season, Bangkok United won 1–0 against Navy on the opening day in the league. The team ended their season on a high note by finishing third in the Thai League 1 and reaching the 2017 Thai FA Cup final, losing 4–2 to Chiangrai United. Despite coming third, the club managed to be the league highest scorers with 97 goals from 34 games, making them the most productive team in the division by far and finishing just one short of breaking a record set by Buriram United in 2015. A big contributing factor to this was the goals from attacking duo Dragan Bošković and Mario Gjurovski who netted 50 goals between them.

In the 2018 season, Bangkok United finished the league in second place with 71 points.

In the 2022–23 season, Bangkok United ended in second place with 62 points, and also ended up as the runners-up in the 2022–23 Thai FA Cup. Thus the club qualified to the 2023–24 AFC Champions League. Bangkok United won the 2023 Thailand Champions Cup after beating 2022–23 league champions Buriram United 2–0 on 5 August 2023.

==== Return to the AFC Champions League and Thai FA Cup champions ====
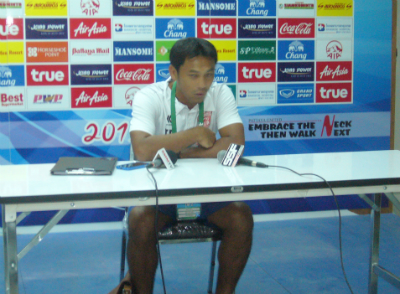
Totchtawan Sripan has the longest tenure as head coach in the club history, guiding them to win the 2023–24 Thai FA Cup.

In 2023, Bangkok United returned to the AFC Champions League group stage being drawn in Group F with Jeonbuk Hyundai Motors, Kitchee SC and Lion City Sailors. On 20 September 2023, the club played its first AFC Champions League match away from home, coming back from 1–0 down to winning the game to 1–2, with goals from club captain Everton and Thitiphan Puangchan at the Jalan Besar Stadium. On 4 October 2023, Bangkok United secured a famous 3–2 home victory against Korean champions Jeonbuk Hyundai Motors, taking them to the top of the group with six points on matchday 2. Bangkok United went on to become group leaders with four wins, one draw and one loss, being one point ahead of Jeonbuk Hyundai Motors, and thus qualifying to the round of 16. Bangkok United faced off against 2022 J1 League champions, Yokohama F. Marinos, where both teams settled for a 2–2 draw in the first leg.In the second leg, Bangkok United managed to hold on Yokohama F. Marinos until extra time, where they conceded a late penalty in the 120+2th minute. Bangkok United lost 3–2 on aggregate and was knocked out by the eventual runners-up of the tournament.

==== 2023–24 AFC Champions League group stage - Group F ====
Pos	Team	Pld	W	D	L	GF	GA	GD	Pts	Qualification	UTD	JBH	LCS	KIT
1	(Thailand) Bangkok United	6	4	1	1	11	8	+3	13	Advance to round of 16	—	3–2	1–0	1–1
2	(South Korea) Jeonbuk Hyundai Motors	6	4	0	2	12	9	+3	12	Advance to round of 16	3–2	—	3–0	2–1
3	(Singapore) Lion City Sailors	6	2	0	4	5	9	−4	6		1–2	2–0	—	0–2
4	(Hong Kong) Kitchee	6	1	1	4	7	9	−2	4		1–2	1–2	1–2	—

Source: AFC
Rules for classification: Tiebreakers

Bangkok United starting line during the 2023–24 Thai FA Cup final

Bangkok United ended the 2023–24 season in second place with 61 points. The club won the 2023–24 Thai FA Cup in a penalties shootout against Dragon Pathumwan Kanchanaburi. Bangkok United then qualified to the 2024–25 AFC Champions League Elite qualifying play-offs, facing Chinese club Shandong Taishan on 13 August 2024. However, Bangkok United failed to qualify to the 2024–25 AFC Champions League Elite after losing 4–3 on penalties shootout. Thus the club entered the 2024–25 AFC Champions League Two being drawn in Group G alongside Singaporean club Tampines Rovers, Hong Kong club Lee Man and Vietnamese club Nam Định. Bangkok United topped the group in the AFC Champions League Two with 13 points, advancing to the round of 16. In the round of 16, Bangkok United faced off against Australian club Sydney FC, where Thitiphan Puangchan scored an 90+6 stoppage time equaliser. The match ended at 2–2 at the Sydney Football Stadium. In the second leg at home, Bangkok United lost 3–2 in extra time, bowing out from the tournament with a 5–4 losing aggregate. Becoming the 2024–25 runners-up in the league, Bangkok United qualified for the 2025–26 AFC Champions League Elite qualifying play-off and also the regional 2025–26 ASEAN Club Championship. In the ASEAN Club Championship, Bangkok United was drawn in the group of death alongside regional powerhouse with Malaysian club Johor Darul Ta'zim, Vietnamese club Nam Định, Singaporean club Lion City Sailors who went on to become the finalist of the 2025 AFC Champions League Two final and Cambodian club Preah Khan Reach Svay Rieng who was the finalist of the 2025 AFC Challenge League final. In the end, Bangkok United finished in 5th place in the group stage of the ASEAN Club Championship.

Bangkok United finished the 2024–25 season in second place with 69 points, sitting one point below the reigning champions Buriram United. The club qualified to the 2025–26 AFC Champions League Elite qualifying play-offs, facing Chinese club Chengdu Rongcheng on 12 August 2025. However, Bangkok United failed to qualify to the 2025–26 AFC Champions League Elite group stage after suffering a 3–0 battering defeat at the Phoenix Hill Football Stadium. The club entered the 2025–26 AFC Champions League Two group stage on direct entry, where they were drawn in Group G alongside Indonesian club Persib Bandung, Singaporean club Lion City Sailors and Malaysian club Selangor, where the group was known as the 'Southeast Asian group of death'. Bangkok United alongside Lion City Sailors finished the group stage with 10 points. Bangkok United finished as runners-up due to head-to-head points with Lion City Sailors. In the round of 16, Bangkok United faced Australian club Macarthur FC. Bangkok United defeated them 4–2 on aggregate, to qualify to the quarter-finals, facing off against Singaporean club Tampines Rovers. Bangkok United won 4–3 on aggregate, advancing to the semi-finals of the tournament for the first time, facing Japan opposition Gamba Osaka.

== Academy development ==
Bangkok United signed a collaboration agreement with Surasakmontree School and Bangkok Christian College. These agreements resulted in the introduction of young players from these schools joining the first team, such as Sasalak Haiprakhon, Sarayut Sompim, Jakkit Wachpirom, Anusith Termmee, Nattawut Suksum, Wisarut Imura, and Guntapon Keereeleang.

Bangkok United operates youth and junior youth teams as part of their academy to nurture local talent under the project "cp-dreams." (Thai lit. ซีพี สานฝัน...ปันโอกาส). In 2019, seven youth players of this project from Bangkok Christian College were call-ups to Thailand U-12. They helped Thailand U-12 to finish in third place in the U-12 Junior Soccer World Challenge football tournament, beating Tokyo Verdy Junior, 2–0; Barcelona, 1–0; and JFA Training Center Osaka, 2–1.

== Stadium ==
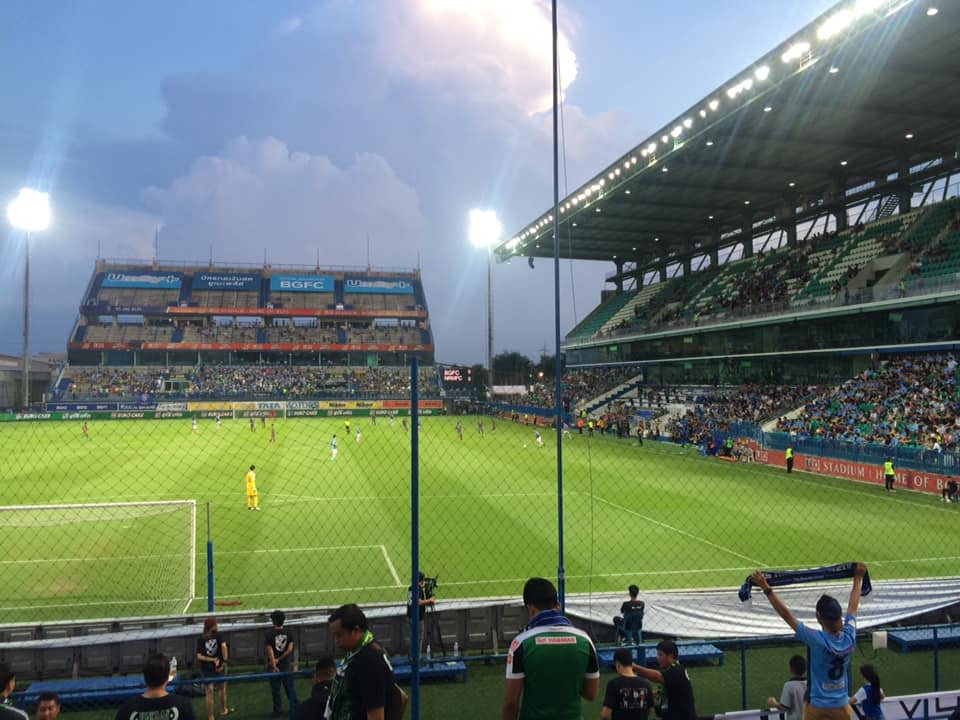
True BG Stadium

Bangkok United spent most of their decorated days playing their home ground at the Thammasat Stadium from 2016 until 2025. The stadium has a capacity of 25,000. It can include fixtures in the Thai League 1 and AFC Champions League, due to its larger capacity and ability to meet continental competition requirements.

In April 2025, Bangkok United announced that the club would relocate its home matches to True BG Stadium beginning from the 2025–26 Thai League 1 season. The stadium is currently shared with BG Pathum United. Previously known for its iconic three-sided main stand, the newly constructed fourth stand expanded the stadium's capacity to 15,114 spectators. It is located close to Bangkok. Bangkok United's move to True BG Stadium reflected the club's ambition to elevate its profile domestically and in regional competitions, while strengthening ties within its corporate and sporting partnerships.

=== Stadium and locations ===
Coordinates	Location	Stadium	Year
14°02′19″N 100°36′08″E	Pathum Thani	Bangkok University Stadium (Rangsit)	2007–2008
13°46′00″N 100°33′10″E	Bangkok	Thai-Japanese Stadium	2009–2015
14°04′04″N 100°35′55″E	Pathum Thani	Thammasat Stadium	2016–2025
14°00′02″N 100°40′45″E	Pathum Thani	True BG Stadium	2025–present

== Kit suppliers and shirt sponsors ==
List of Bangkok United jersey since their interceptions in 2009.

Year	Kit manufacturer	Main sponsors
2009	(Germany) Adidas	(Thailand) Chang
2010–2013	(Thailand) FBT	(Thailand) True Corporation
2014–2015	(Thailand) Ari	(Thailand) PlanB.media
2016–2017	(Thailand) Ari	(Thailand) True Corporation
2017–2019	(Thailand) Ari	(Thailand) True Corporation (China) Huawei (AFC competitions only)
2020–2022	(Thailand) Ari	(Thailand) True Corporation
2023–2025	(Thailand) Ari	(Thailand) True Corporation (Thailand) Charoen Pokphand (AFC competitions only)
2025–present	(Germany) Adidas	(Thailand) True Corporation (Thailand) Charoen Pokphand (AFC competitions only)

== Affiliated clubs ==
- (Japan) FC Tokyo (2017–present)

Bangkok United signed a partnership agreement with J1 League, FC Tokyo in September 2017. There is a deal to work together at developing the academy players, and strengthen the bond between the teams in order to improve the over all top team level and create a new business.

== Players ==
=== Current squad ===
Note: Flags indicate national team as defined under FIFA eligibility rules; some limited exceptions apply. Players may hold more than one non-FIFA nationality.

No.	Pos.	Nation	Player
1	GK	THA	Patiwat Khammai
3	DF	BRA	Everton (captain)
4	MF	THA	Weerathep Pomphan
5	DF	BRA	Philipe Maia
6	MF	PHI	John-Patrick Strauß
7	MF	THA	Kakana Khamyok
8	MF	THA	Thitiphan Puangchan
10	FW	THA	Teerasil Dangda
11	FW	OMA	Muhsen Al-Ghassani
17	MF	THA	Wisarut Imura
18	MF	ISR	Yonatan Cohen
19	FW	BRA	Willian Popp
20	FW	ESP	Marc Cardona
21	MF	AUS	Anthony Caceres
22	DF	THA	Wichan Inaram ^{U21}
23	DF	KOR	Lee Ki-je
24	DF	THA	Wanchai Jarunongkran
26	DF	THA	Suphan Thongsong

No.	Pos.	Nation	Player
27	DF	THA	James Beresford
29	GK	THA	Phuwadol Pholsongkram
35	MF	THA	Kritsada Nontharat
37	MF	THA	Picha Autra
38	GK	THA	Chinnapong Raksri
39	MF	THA	Pokklaw Anan
43	DF	THA	Surachai Booncharee ^{U21}
44	FW	THA	Narakorn Kangkratok
53	GK	THA	Kamolphop Ratchanaporn
54	FW	THA	Achita Nawathit
55	FW	THA	Aekkarat Sansuwan
57	MF	THA	Chonlachart Tongjinda
58	MF	THA	Siraphob pannangrong
70	FW	BRA	Arthur Moura
88	GK	THA	Supanut Sudathip ^{U21}
97	FW	BEN	Felipe Santos

=== Under-23s and Academy ===
True Bangkok United U-21 Squad For PEA U21 Youngster League 2025

Note: Flags indicate national team as defined under FIFA eligibility rules; some limited exceptions apply. Players may hold more than one non-FIFA nationality.

No.	Pos.	Nation	Player
52	DF	THA	Kongpop Sodsong ^{U21}
57	MF	THA	Chonlachart Tongjinda ^{U21}
2	DF	THA	Kittisak Dangsakul ^{U21}
5	DF	THA	Warakorn Huatwiset ^{U21}
6	MF	THA	Sirayos Dansakul ^{U21}
11	FW	THA	Nopparat Promiem ^{U21}
12	GK	THA	Naphol Wongboon ^{U21}
15	DF	THA	Nontapat Ploymee ^{U21}
60	MF	THA	Philip Bijawat Frey ^{U21}
18	MF	THA	Aekkarat Sansuwan ^{U21}
19	FW	THA	Krit Klangpan ^{U21}
21	FW	THA	Putharapol Sanprasit ^{U21}

No.	Pos.	Nation	Player
23	MF	THA	Patchara Wangsawat ^{U21}
24	FW	THA	Thanawat Deeloed ^{U21}
25	GK	THA	Phattharaphon Kaewwongthong ^{U21}
71	DF	THA	Phurich Subhensawang ^{U21}
72	MF	THA	Shunta Hasegawa ^{U21}
73	MF	THA	Nuttapun Meemusor ^{U21}
74	DF	THA	Supakan Binsaha ^{U21}
75	GK	THA	Songphob Kathong ^{U21}
77	MF	THA	Chayadol A-Tit ^{U21}
78	MF	THA	Nutthakit Enanorit ^{U21}
79	DF	THA	Phurinat Poolkamlang ^{U21}
80	MF	THA	Ruski Kade ^{U21}

=== Out on loan ===
Note: Flags indicate national team as defined under FIFA eligibility rules; some limited exceptions apply. Players may hold more than one non-FIFA nationality.

No.	Pos.	Nation	Player
14	FW	THA	Guntapon Keereeleang (at (Thailand) Ayutthaya United)
34	MF	THA	Anon Amornlerdsak (at (Thailand) Rayong)
45	FW	THA	Napat Kuttanan (at (Thailand) Navy)
47	DF	THA	Anaphat Nakngam (at (Thailand) Customs United)
50	DF	THA	Bhumchanok Kamkla (at (Thailand) Ayutthaya United)

No.	Pos.	Nation	Player
59	FW	THA	Chukid Wanpraphao (at (Thailand) Ayutthaya United)
69	FW	THA	Passakorn Biaothungnoi (at (Thailand) Ayutthaya United)
—	FW	BRA	Rivaldinho (at (Thailand) Muangthong United)
—	MF	THA	Pichaya Kongsri (at (Thailand) Muangthong United)

== Management and staff ==
Position	Name
Owner	(Thailand) Kachorn Chiaravanont
Sports director	(Australia) Danny Invincibile
Head coach	(Australia) Danny Invincibile (Interim)
Assistant coach
Assistant coach	(Thailand) Sarif Sainui
Head of analysis	(Portugal) Pedro Ramos
Goalkeeping coach	(Italy) Gianluca Troilo
Physical & fitness coaches	(Brazil) Rodrigo Squinalli
Physical & fitness coaches	(Thailand) Tosaphon Doungjai
Head of medicine	(Brazil) Janilson Quadros da silva
Physiotherapist	(Thailand) Mongkhon Saethao
Interpreter	(Thailand) Nuttapat Lertchanapisit
Team's staff	(Thailand) Chatchai Phuengthong
Team's staff	(Thailand) Aryuwat Dawngin
Under-23s head coach	(Thailand) Jirawat Lainananukul

== Honours ==
Type	Honours	Titles	Seasons
League	Thai League 1/First division	1	2006
League	Thai League 2/Second division	1	2002–03
Cup	Thai FA Cup	1	2023–24
Cup	Thailand Champions Cup	1	2023

Bold is for those competition that are currently active.

== Records and statistics ==
As of 9 October 2026.

Top 10 all-time appearances
Rank	Player	Years	Club appearances
1	(Thailand) Pokklaw Anan	2017–present	315
2	(Brazil) Everton	2018–present	304
4	(Thailand) Manuel Bihr	2016–2026	233
3	(Thailand) Putthinan Wannasri	2015–2025	225
5	(Thailand) Thossawat Limwannasathian	2018–2025	207
6	(Thailand) Rungrath Poomchantuek	2018–2026	206
7	(Thailand) Anthony Ampaipitakwong	2013–2021	193
8	(Thailand) Peerapat Notchaiya	2019–2025	191
8	(Thailand) Sanrawat Dechmitr	2013–2022	191
10	(Thailand) Mika Chunuonsee	2014–2022	176

Top 10 all-time scorers
Rank	Player	Club appearances	Total goals
1	(Montenegro) Dragan Bošković	103	75
2	(Bahrain) Jaycee John	60	43
2	(Brazil) Willen Mota	65	43
4	(Brazil) Heberty	82	40
5	(Brazil) Vander Luiz	171	39
6	(Palestine) Mahmoud Eid	101	37
7	(Oman) Muhsen Al-Ghassani	82	35
7	(Brazil) Everton	304	35
9	(Thailand) Pokklaw Anan	315	31
10	(North Macedonia) Mario Gjurovski	64	29
10	(Thailand) Teeratep Winothai	93	29

- Biggest wins: 7–0 vs Samut Sakhon City (30 October 2025)
- Heaviest defeats: 7–0 vs BEC Tero Sasana (24 April 2014)
- Youngest goal scorers: Guntapon Keereeleang ~ 18 years 3 months 9 days old (on 19 October 2025 vs Chiangmai Dream)
- Oldest goal scorers: Teerasil Dangda ~ 37 years 7 months 15 days old (on 21 January 2026 vs Khon Kaen United)
- Youngest ever debutant: Kritsada Nontharat ~ 17 years 3 months 28 days old (on 13 June 2018 vs Samut Sakhon City)
- Oldest ever player: Teerasil Dangda ~ 37 years 7 months 15 days old (on 21 January 2016 vs Khon Kaen United)

== Former players ==
As of 2026–27 season.

=== International capped players ===
AFC/OFC: (Bahrain) Jaycee John; (Indonesia) Pratama Arhan; (Iran) Mehrdad Pooladi; (Iraq) Hussein Alaa; (Japan) Hajime Hosogai; (Japan) Mike Havenaar; (Lebanon) Bassel Jradi; (Oman) Muhsen Al-Ghassani; (Palestine) Carlos Salom; (Palestine) Mahmoud Eid; (Philippines) John-Patrick Strauß; (Philippines) Michael Falkesgaard; (Singapore) Kyoga Nakamura; (South Korea) Kim Yoo-Jin; (South Korea) Lee Ki-je	CAF: (Benin) Felipe Santos; (Mali) Kalifa Cissé; (Zimbabwe) Mike Temwanjera	UEFA: (Croatia) Antun Palić; (France) Amadou Soukouna; (Germany) Chinedu Ede; (Israel) Yonatan Cohen; (North Macedonia) Mario Gjurovski; (Montenegro) Dragan Bošković; (Montenegro) Nebojša Kosović; (Netherlands) Ilias Alhaft; (Portugal) Yohan Tavares; (Serbia) Luka Adžić; (Serbia) Miloš Bogunović	CONMEBOL/ CONCACAF: (Curaçao) Richairo Živković; (El Salvador) Nelson Bonilla

== Managerial history ==
List of former Bangkok United managers (2001–present)

Name	Period	Honours
Somchai Subpherm	2001–2009	– 2006 Thailand Premier League – 2002–03 Thai League 2
Worakorn Wichanarong	2010	
Prapol Pongpanich	2010 – October 2011	
Suwaroch Apiwatwarachai	October 2011 – January 2012	
Sasom Pobprasert	January 2012 – January 2014	
Rui Bento	January 2014 – April 2014	
Thawatchai Damrong-Ongtrakul	April 2014 – June 2014	
Alexandré Pölking	June 2014 – October 2020	
Danny Invincibile (interim)	October 2020 – November 2020	
Totchtawan Sripan	November 2020 – March 2022	
Aurelio Vidmar	March 2022 – December 2022	
Totchtawan Sripan (2)	December 2022 – October 2026	– 2023–24 Thai FA Cup – 2023 Thailand Champions Cup
Danny Invincibile (interim)	October 2026 – present	–

== Season by season record ==
Season	League										FA Cup	League Cup	ACL	ACL2	Top scorer	
Season	Division	P	W	D	L	F	A	GD	Pts	Pos.	FA Cup	League Cup	ACL	ACL2	Name	Goals
2002–03	↑ Division 1 (2)	22	13	8	1	42	10	32	47	1st			—	—	—N/a	
2003–04	Premier League (1)	18	9	4	5	26	22	4	31	4th			—	—	—N/a	—N/a
2004–05	Premier League (1)	18	5	7	6	16	21	−5	22	7th			—	—	—N/a	—N/a
2006	Premier League (1)	22	11	6	5	25	17	8	39	1st			—	—	Ubon Kaikaew	7
2007	Premier League (1)	30	14	5	11	39	36	3	47	4th			Group stage	—	Kittisak Siriwan	8
2008	Premier League (1)	30	9	8	13	28	36	−8	35	10th			—	—	Suriya Domtaisong	8
2009	Premier League (1)	30	5	15	10	24	34	−10	30	13th	Quarter-finals		—	—	Ubon Kaikaew	4
2010	↓ Premier League (1)	30	5	9	16	25	52	−27	24	15th	Fourth round	Quarter-finals	—	—	Sarif Sainui	5
2011	Division 1 (2)	34	15	6	13	54	49	5	51	6th	Second round	First round	—	—	Romain Gasmi	13
2012	↑ Division 1 (2)	34	23	5	6	57	29	28	74	3rd	Third round	First round	—	—	Romain Gasmi	17
2013	Premier League (1)	32	8	7	17	38	61	−23	31	13th	Fourth round	First round	—	—	Sompong Soleb	9
2014	Premier League (1)	38	15	9	14	55	56	−1	54	8th	Quarter-finals	First round	—	—	Romain Gasmi	12
2015	Premier League (1)	34	16	9	9	59	47	12	57	5th	First round	Second round	—	—	Dragan Bošković	13
2016	Premier League (1)	31	26	2	3	72	36	36	75	2nd	First round	Quarter-finals	—	—	Dragan Bošković	20
2017	Thai League (1)	34	21	3	10	97	57	40	66	3rd	Runners-up	Second round	Preliminary round 2	—	Dragan Bošković	38
2018	Thai League (1)	34	21	8	5	68	36	32	71	2nd	First round	Second round	—	—	Robson	14
2019	Thai League (1)	30	13	11	6	55	32	23	50	4th	Semi-finals	Quarter-finals	Preliminary round 2	—	Nelson Bonilla	16
2020–21	Thai League (1)	30	15	6	9	57	39	18	51	5th	Semi-finals	—	—	—	Nattawut Suksum	12
2021–22	Thai League (1)	30	15	8	7	53	30	23	53	3rd	Third round	Quarter-finals	—	—	Heberty	15
2022–23	Thai League (1)	30	19	5	6	55	22	33	62	2nd	Runners-up	Quarter-finals	—	—	Willen Mota	11
2023–24	Thai League (1)	30	17	10	3	58	24	34	61	2nd	Champions	Second round	Round of 16	—	Willen Mota	20
2024–25	Thai League (1)	30	21	6	3	63	30	33	69	2nd	Third round	Quarter-finals	Play-off round	Round of 16	Muhsen Al-Ghassani	15
2025–26	Thai League (1)	30	13	11	6	43	32	11	50	5th	Quarter-finals	Round of 16	Play-off round	Semi-finals	Muhsen Al-Ghassani	6

Champions	Runners-up	Third place	Promoted	Relegated

- (1), (2). Brackets with numbers inside indicates the level of division within the Thai football league system
- N/A = No answer

== Continental record ==
Competition	Pld	W	D	L	GF	GA	GD	Win%
AFC Champions League Elite	18	4	7	7	19	24	−5	22.22
AFC Champions League Two	20	10	5	5	33	26	+7	50.00
ASEAN Club Championship	5	1	2	2	6	12	−6	20.00
Total	43	15	14	14	58	62	−4	34.88

Matches

Season	Competition	Round	Club	Home	Away	Aggregate
2007	AFC Champions League	Group F	(South Korea) Chunnam Dragons	0–0	2–3	4th out of 4
2007	AFC Champions League	Group F	(Japan) Kawasaki Frontale	1–2	1–1	4th out of 4
2007	AFC Champions League	Group F	(Indonesia) Arema Malang	0–0	0–1	4th out of 4
2017	AFC Champions League	Preliminary round 2	(Malaysia) Johor Darul Ta'zim	1–1 (a.e.t.) (4–5 p)		
2019	AFC Champions League	Preliminary round 2	(Vietnam) Hanoi	0–1		
2023–24	AFC Champions League	Group F	(Singapore) Lion City Sailors	1–0	2–1	1st out of 4
2023–24	AFC Champions League	Group F	(South Korea) Jeonbuk Hyundai Motors	3–2	2–3	1st out of 4
2023–24	AFC Champions League	Group F	(Hong Kong) Kitchee	1–1	2–1	1st out of 4
2023–24	AFC Champions League	Round of 16	(Japan) Yokohama F. Marinos	2–2	0–1 (a.e.t.)	2–3 (a.e.t.)
2024–25	AFC Champions League Elite	Play-off round	(China) Shandong Taishan	1–1 (a.e.t.) (3–4 p)		
2024–25	AFC Champions League Two	Group G	(Vietnam) Nam Định	3–2	0–0	1st out of 4
2024–25	AFC Champions League Two	Group G	(Hong Kong) Lee Man	4–1	1–0	1st out of 4
2024–25	AFC Champions League Two	Group G	(Singapore) Tampines Rovers	4–2	0–1	1st out of 4
2024–25	AFC Champions League Two	Round of 16	(Australia) Sydney FC	2–3 (a.e.t.)	2–2	4–5 (a.e.t.)
2025–26	AFC Champions League Elite	Play-off round	(China) Chengdu Rongcheng	0–3		
2025–26	AFC Champions League Two	Group G	(Malaysia) Selangor	1–1	4–2	2nd out of 4
2025–26	AFC Champions League Two	Group G	(Singapore) Lion City Sailors	1–0	2–1	2nd out of 4
2025–26	AFC Champions League Two	Group G	(Indonesia) Persib Bandung	0–2	0–1	2nd out of 4
2025–26	AFC Champions League Two	Round of 16	(Australia) Macarthur	2–0	2–2	4–2
2025–26	AFC Champions League Two	Quarter-finals	(Singapore) Tampines Rovers	2–1	2–2	4–3
2025–26	AFC Champions League Two	Semi-finals	(Japan) Gamba Osaka	0–3	1–0	1–3
2025–26	ASEAN Club Championship	Group B	(Malaysia) Johor Darul Ta'zim	—N/a	0–4	4th out of 6
2025–26	ASEAN Club Championship	Group B	(Singapore) Lion City Sailors	2–2	—N/a	4th out of 6
2025–26	ASEAN Club Championship	Group B	(Vietnam) Nam Định	1–4	—N/a	4th out of 6
2025–26	ASEAN Club Championship	Group B	(Myanmar) Shan United	2–1	—N/a	4th out of 6
2025–26	ASEAN Club Championship	Group B	(Cambodia) PKR Svay Rieng	—N/a	1–1	4th out of 6

By country

Country	Pld	W	D	L	GF	GA	GD	Win %
Australia	4	1	2	1	8	7	+1	25.00
Cambodia	1	0	1	0	1	1	+0	0.00
China	2	0	1	1	1	4	−3	0.00
Hong Kong	4	3	1	0	8	3	+5	75.00
Indonesia	4	0	1	3	0	4	−4	0.00
Japan	6	1	2	3	5	9	−4	16.67
Malaysia	4	1	2	1	6	8	−2	25.00
Myanmar	1	1	0	0	2	1	+1	100.00
Singapore	9	6	2	1	16	10	+6	66.67
South Korea	4	1	1	2	7	8	−1	25.00
Vietnam	4	1	1	2	4	7	−3	25.00
Total	42	15	13	14	57	61	−4	35.71
