= 2020–21 Bangkok United F.C. season =

Bangkok United F.C.
2020–21 season
- Chairman: Kajorn Chearavanont
- Manager: Alexandré Pölking (until 18 October); Danny Invincibile (interim, Until 5 November); Totchtawan Sripan (from 5 November)
- Stadium: Thammasat Stadium, Khlong Luang, Pathum Thani, Thailand
- Thai League: 5th
- FA Cup: Semi-finals
- Top goalscorer: League: Nattawut Suksum (12); All: Nattawut Suksum (14)

The 2020–21 season is Bangkok United Football Club's 12th in the new era since they took over from Bangkok University Football Club in 2009. It is the 5th season in the Thai League and the club's 10th (8th consecutive) season in the top flight of the Thai football league system since returning in the 2013 season.

In the league, match 5–30 are postponed following the coronavirus outbreak.

== Squad ==
As of 17 January 2020.

Squad No.	Name	Nationality	Position(s)	Date of birth (age)	Last club
Goalkeepers
1	Michael Falkesgaard	(Philippines) (Denmark)	GK	9 April 1991 (age 35)	(Denmark) FC Midtjylland
34	Warut Mekmusik	(Thailand)	GK	21 February 1992 (age 34)	(Thailand) Air Force United F.C.
52	Supanut Suadsong	(Thailand)	GK	25 February 1999 (age 27)	Youth Team
Defenders
3	Everton Gonçalves (VC)	(Brazil)	CB	5 February 1990 (age 36)	(Thailand) Chiangrai United F.C.
4	Manuel Bihr	(Thailand) (Germany)	CB	17 August 1993 (age 33)	(Germany) Stuttgarter Kickers
5	Putthinan Wannasri	(Thailand)	CB / RB / LB	5 September 1992 (age 34)	(Thailand) Suphanburi F.C.
16	Mika Chunuonsee	(Thailand) (Wales)	CB / RB	26 March 1989 (age 37)	(Thailand) Suphanburi F.C.
19	Tristan Do	(Thailand) (France)	RB / RW	31 January 1993 (age 33)	(Thailand) Muangthong United F.C.
24	Wanchai Jarunongkran	(Thailand)	LB	18 December 1996 (age 29)	(Thailand) Air Force United F.C.
26	Peerapat Notchaiya	(Thailand)	LB / LWB	4 February 1993 (age 33)	(Thailand) Muangthong United F.C.
31	Jakkit Wachpirom	(Thailand)	RB / RWB / RW	26 January 1997 (age 29)	Youth Team
45	Santipap Yaemsaen	(Thailand)	CB	1 March 2000 (age 26)	Youth Team
Midfielders
6	Anthony Ampaipitakwong (C)	(Thailand) (United States)	CM / DM	14 June 1988 (age 38)	(Thailand) Buriram United F.C.
7	Hajime Hosogai	(Japan)	CM / DM	10 June 1986 (age 40)	(Thailand) Buriram United F.C.
8	Wisarut Imura	(Thailand)	CM / DM	18 October 1997 (age 28)	(Thailand) Air Force United F.C.
10	Vander Luiz	(Brazil)	RW / LW / AM	17 April 1990 (age 36)	(Thailand) Chiangrai United F.C.
11	Anon Amornlerdsak	(Thailand)	RW / LW / AM	6 November 1997 (age 28)	(Thailand) Bangkok Glass F.C.
17	Rungrath Poomchantuek	(Thailand)	RW / LW	17 May 1992 (age 34)	(Thailand) Ratchaburi Mitr Phol F.C.
18	Alexander Sieghart	(Thailand) (Germany)	CM / DM	29 July 1994 (age 32)	(Thailand) Buriram United F.C.
28	Thossawat Limwannasathian	(Thailand)	CM / DM	17 May 1993 (age 33)	(Thailand) Muangthong United F.C.
29	Sanrawat Dechmitr (3rd C)	(Thailand)	CM / AM	3 August 1989 (age 37)	(Thailand) BEC Tero Sasana F.C.
33	Jirayu Niamthaisong	(Thailand)	CM	20 October 1997 (age 28)	Youth Team
36	Jedsadakorn Kowngam	(Thailand)	CM	13 March 1997 (age 29)	Youth Team
39	Pokklaw Anan	(Thailand)	CM / AM	4 March 1991 (age 35)	(Thailand) Chonburi F.C.
Strikers
14	Nattawut Suksum	(Thailand)	FW / SS	6 November 1997 (age 28)	Youth Team
20	Chananan Pombuppha	(Thailand)	FW / SS	17 March 1992 (age 34)	(Thailand) Suphanburi F.C.
22	Guntapon Keereeleang	(Thailand)	FW / SS	22 January 2001 (age 25)	Youth Team
37	Heberty Fernandes	(Brazil)	FW / SS	29 August 1988 (age 38)	(Thailand) Muangthong United F.C.
38	Brenner Marlos	(Brazil)	FW / SS	1 March 1994 (age 32)	(Brazil) Avaí FC

== Transfer ==
=== Pre-season transfer ===
==== In ====
Position	Player	Transferred from	Ref
MF	(Japan) Hajime Hosogai	(Thailand) Buriram United	Season loan
FW	(Brazil) Brenner Marlos	(Brazil) Internacional	
DF	(Thailand) (Australia) Zachary Binrong	(Australia) Brisbane Strikers	

==== Out ====
Position	Player	Transferred To	Ref
DF	(Thailand) Ekkachai Sumrei	(Thailand) Police Tero F.C.	
DF	(Thailand) Prat Samakrat	(Thailand) Nakhon Pathom United F.C.	
MF	(Thailand) Jakkapan Pornsai	(Thailand) Ratchaburi Mitr Phol F.C.	
MF	(Thailand) Chayathorn Tapsuvanavon	(Japan) FC Tokyo U-23	
FW	(Thailand) Teeratep Winothai	(Thailand) Chonburi F.C.	
FW	(Japan) (Netherlands) Mike Havenaar	(Japan) Ventforet Kofu	

==== Retained ====
Position	Player	Ref

==== Return from loan ====
Position	Player	Transferred from	Ref
GK	(Thailand) Varuth Wongsomsak	(Thailand) Air Force Central F.C.	Loan Return
GK	(Thailand) Kittipong Phuthawchueak	(Thailand) Ratchaburi Mitr Phol F.C.	Loan Return
DF	(Thailand) Worawut Sathaporn	(Thailand) Air Force Central F.C.	Loan Return
DF	(Thailand) Athatcha Rahongthong	(Thailand) Thai Honda F.C.	Loan Return
DF	(Thailand) Nakin Wisetchat	(Thailand) Army United F.C.	Loan Return
DF	(Thailand) Sathaporn Daengsee	(Thailand) Trat F.C.	Loan Return
MF	(Thailand) Jakkit Wachpirom	(Thailand) Samut Prakan City F.C.	Loan Return
MF	(Thailand) Nattawut Suksum	(Japan) FC Tokyo U-23	Loan Return
MF	(Thailand) Jedsadakorn Kowngam	(Thailand) Army United F.C.	Loan Return
MF	(Thailand) (Sweden) Oscar Kahl	(Thailand) Air Force Central F.C.	Loan Return
MF	(Thailand) Phattharaphol Khamsuk	(Thailand) Air Force Central F.C.	Loan Return
MF	(Thailand) Jakkapan Pornsai	(Thailand) Ratchaburi Mitr Phol F.C.	Loan Return
FW	(Thailand) Sittichok Kannoo	(Thailand) Air Force Central F.C.	Loan Return
FW	(Thailand) Teeratep Winothai	(Thailand) Chonburi F.C.	Loan Return
FW	(Thailand) Sompong Soleb	(Thailand) Chonburi F.C.	Loan Return

=== Mid-season transfer ===
==== In ====
Position	Player	Transferred from	Ref
MF	(Thailand) Chayathorn Tapsuvanavon	(Japan) FC Tokyo U-23	Loan Return

==== Out ====
Position	Player	Transferred To	Ref
FW	(Thailand) Sittichok Kannoo	(Thailand) Ratchaburi Mitr Phol F.C.	Free
FW	(El Salvador) Nelson Bonilla	(Thailand) Port F.C.	Season loan

Note 1: Bonilla will join Port on an initial loan deal, which will become a permanent transfer when his contract with Bangkok United is up in 31/12/2020.

== Friendlies ==
=== Pre-season friendly ===
Win Draw Loss

26 January 2020 1	True Bangkok United (Thailand)	3–1	(Thailand) Ratchaburi Mitr Phol	Pathum Thani, Thailand
16.15 UTC+7	Vander; Chananan; Sanrawat		Jakkapan	Stadium: Thammasat Training Ground

29 January 2020 2	True Bangkok United (Thailand)	2–2	(South Korea) Incheon United	Pathum Thani, Thailand
17.00 UTC+7	Rungrath 12'; Putthinan 18'		Mugoša 50'; Dong-yoon 74'	Stadium: Thammasat Training Ground

2020 Asia Cup

18 January 2020 1	Hanoi FC (Vietnam)	0–3	(Thailand) True Bangkok United	Selangor, Malaysia
16.00 UTC+7			Nattawut 39'; Vander 63'; Guntapon 82'	Stadium: Shah Alam Stadium

19 January 2020 2	Selangor (Malaysia)	0–0 (2–4 p)	(Thailand) True Bangkok United	Selangor, Malaysia
20.00 UTC+7				Stadium: Shah Alam Stadium
	Penalties
	Olusegun (penalty scored); Sean Selvaraj (penalty scored); Zahril Azri (penalty missed); Halim Saari (penalty missed)		(penalty scored) Vander; (penalty missed) Nattawut; (penalty scored) Tristan; (penalty scored) Bihr; (penalty scored) Pokklaw

=== Mid-season friendly ===
8 August 2020 1	Bangkok United (Thailand)	4–2	(Thailand) Chainat Hornbill	Pathum Thani, Thailand
				Stadium: Thammasat Stadium

12 August 2020 2	Bangkok United (Thailand)	2–0	(Thailand) Sukhothai	Pathum Thani, Thailand
	Brenner Marlos; Anon Amornlerdsak			Stadium: Thammasat Stadium

15 August 2020 3	Bangkok United (Thailand)	4–1	(Thailand) Samut Prakan City	Pathum Thani, Thailand
	Tristan Do 41'; Anon Amornlerdsak 43'; Everton Gonçalves Saturnino 49'; Jirayu Niamthaisong 112'		Nattapon Malapun 104'	Stadium: Thammasat Stadium

23 August 2020 4	Bangkok United (Thailand)	8–0	(Thailand) Ayutthaya United	Pathum Thani, Thailand
				Stadium: Thammasat Stadium

29 August 2020 5	Bangkok United (Thailand)	3–1	(Thailand) Police Tero	Pathum Thani, Thailand
	Thossawat Limwannasathian 31'; Rungrath Poomchantuek 55'; Chananan Pombuppha 81'			Stadium: Thammasat Stadium

4 September 2020 6	Bangkok United (Thailand)	1–3	(Thailand) Port	Nonthaburi Province
	Kevin Deeromram 23' (o.g.)		Sergio Suárez 32'; Kevin Deeromram 50'; Nattawut Sombatyotha 68'	Stadium: SCG Stadium

== Competitions ==
=== Overview ===
Competition	First match	Last match	Starting round	Record							
Competition	First match	Last match	Starting round	Pld	W	D	L	GF	GA	GD	Win %
Thai League	15 February 2020	May 2021	Matchday 1	30	15	6	9	57	39	+18	50.00
FA Cup	7 November 2020	2021	First Round	5	4	0	1	17	6	+11	80.00
Total				35	19	6	10	74	45	+29	54.29

Last updated: 7 April 2021
Source: Competitions

=== Thai League ===
==== League table ====
Pos	Team	Pld	W	D	L	GF	GA	GD	Pts	Qualification
3	Port	30	17	5	8	58	36	+22	56	Qualification for 2022 AFC Champions League qualifying play-offs
4	Chiangrai United (Note: Chiangrai United qualified for the AFC Champions League group stage as 2020–21 Thai FA Cup winners.)	30	16	6	8	48	32	+16	54	Qualification for 2022 AFC Champions League group stage
5	Bangkok United	30	15	6	9	57	39	+18	51	
6	Samut Prakan City	30	14	5	11	58	51	+7	47 (Note: Samut Prakan City finished ahead of Muangthong United on head-to-head points: Muangthong United 0–0 Samut Prakan City, Samut Prakan City 4–2 Muangthong United.)	
7	Muangthong United	30	14	5	11	52	43	+9	47	

Source: Thai League
Rules for classification: 1) Points; 2) Head-to-head points; 3) Head-to-head goals difference; 4) Head-to-head goals scored; 5) Overall goals difference; 6) Overall goals scored; 7) Fair play points; 8) Play-off without extra time;).

==== Results summary ====
Overall								Home						Away					
Pld	W	D	L	GF	GA	GD	Pts	W	D	L	GF	GA	GD	W	D	L	GF	GA	GD
30	15	6	9	57	39	+18	51	8	2	5	37	21	+16	7	4	4	20	18	+2

==== Results by matchday ====
Matchday	1	2	3	4	5	6	7	8	9	10	11	12	13	14	15	16	17	18	19	20	21	22	23	24	25	26	27	28	29	30
Ground	H	A	A	H	H	H	A	A	H	A	H	A	H	A	A	H	H	A	H	A	A	H	A	H	A	H	A	H	H	A
Result	W	W	W	W	W	L	L	L	L	D	L	W	D	L	L	D	W	D	W	W	D	W	W	L	D	W	W	L	W	W
Position	2	2	3	1	1	2	2	2	7	6	9	6	5	6	9	9	8	7	8	8	7	6	5	5	6	4	4	5	5	5

Source: Thai League T1
A = Away; H = Home; W = Win; D = Draw; L = Loss

==== Matches ====
15 February 2020 1	True Bangkok United	2–0	PT Prachuap	Pathum Thani
17.45 UTC+7	Nattawut 13'; Adun 25' (o.g.); Sieghart (yellow card) 83'	Report	Adun (yellow card) 45'	Stadium: True Stadium; Attendance: 2,977; Referee: Panumat Phansamo

23 February 2020 2	SCG Muangthong United	1–2	True Bangkok United	Nonthaburi
19.00 UTC+7	Wattana (yellow card) 33'; Everton 60' (o.g.); Petcharat (yellow card) 74'; Atikun (yellow card) 89'	Report	Anon 30' , (yellow card) 52'; Hosogai (yellow card) 56'; Thossawat 74'; Vander (yellow card) 81'	Stadium: SCG Stadium; Attendance: 9,214; Referee: Mongkolchai Pechsri

26 February 2020 3	Samut Prakan City	1–2	True Bangkok United	Samut Prakan
20.00 UTC+7	Chayawat 39'; Sakai (yellow card) 15'; Suphanan (yellow card) 19'; Peeradon (yellow card) 73'	Report	Vander 15' (pen.); Tristan (yellow card) 17'; Wanchai (yellow card) 62'; Everton 73'; Nattawut (yellow card) 77'	Stadium: Samut Prakarn SAT Stadium; Attendance: 2,239; Referee: Songkran Bunmeekiart

29 February 2020 4	True Bangkok United	4–1	Singha Chiangrai United	Pathum Thani
18.00 UTC+7	Nattawut (yellow card) 28'; Bihr 37'; Hosogai 84'; Brenner 88'; Falkesgaard (yellow card) 90+1'; Sanrawat 90+2'	Report	Chutiphan (yellow card) 17'; Brinner 34'	Stadium: True Stadium; Attendance: 3,780; Referee: Natee Choosuwan

19 September 2020 (Note: The Thai League matches since week 5 are postponed following the coronavirus outbreak.) 5	True Bangkok United	2–1	Suphanburi	Pathum Thani
20.00 UTC+7	Nattawut 58'; Anon 71'	Report	Eliandro 1' , (yellow card) 69'; Tinnakorn (yellow card) 10'; Parndecha (yellow card) 43'; Alef (yellow card) 50'; Wasan (yellow card) 88'	Stadium: True Stadium; Attendance: 2,032 (Note: The Thai League matches since match 5 are played with limited spectators following the new normal regulations.); Referee: Sahapob Sriboonlue

27 September 2020 6	True Bangkok United	0–2	BG Pathum United	Pathum Thani
18.00 UTC+7	Peerapat (yellow card) 82'; Sanrawat (yellow card) 90+1'	Report	Irfan (yellow card) 41'; Cardozo 57'; Bihr 62' (o.g.); Sarawin (yellow card) 85'	Stadium: True Stadium; Attendance: 3,850; Referee: Wiwat Jumpaoon

4 October 2020 7	Chonburi	1–0	True Bangkok United	Chonburi
19.00 UTC+7	Bošković 6'; Sinthaweechai (yellow card) 21'; Kritsada (yellow card) 37'; Kushida (yellow card) 47'; Chatmongkol (yellow card) 63'; Niran (yellow card) 67'	Report	Putthinan (yellow card) 45+1'; Bihr (yellow card) 71'	Stadium: Chonburi Stadium; Attendance: 2,147; Referee: Songkran Bunmeekiart

10 October 2020 8	Ratchaburi Mitr Phol	2–1	True Bangkok United	Ratchaburi
18.00 UTC+7	Pathomchai (yellow card) 11'; Kritsananon (yellow card) 14'; Kiatisak (yellow card) 36'; Roller 45', 83' (pen.); Ukrit (yellow card) 47'	Report	Pokklaw (red card) 45+3'; Nattawut 48'; Sanrawat (yellow card) 76'; Anon (yellow card) 80'	Stadium: Mitr Phol Stadium; Attendance: 2,458; Referee: Chaireag Ngam-som

18 October 2020 9	True Bangkok United	4–5	Sukhothai	Pathum Thani
18.00 UTC+7	Thossawat 38'; Vander 51'; Nattawut 84'; Everton (yellow card) 90+2'; Brenner 90+3'	Report	Ibson 8', 45'; Wanchai 37' (o.g.); Decha (yellow card) 53'; Baggio 60'; Jung 67'	Stadium: True Stadium; Attendance: 1,587; Referee: Warintorn Sassadee

24 October 2020 10	Nakhon Ratchasima	1–1	True Bangkok United	Nakhon Ratchasima
17.45 UTC+7	Dennis (yellow card) 18' , (goal) 69' (pen.); Nattapong (yellow card) 30'; Eakkanut (yellow card) 45'	Report	Bihr 19' , (yellow card) 40'; Sanrawat (yellow card) 28'	Stadium: 80th Birthday Stadium; Attendance: 3,873; Referee: Natee Choosuwan

31 October 2020 11	True Bangkok United	0–1	Port	Pathum Thani
18.30 UTC+7	Hosogai (yellow card) 71'; Tristan (yellow card) 90' , (red card) 90+10'	Report	Worawut (yellow card) 66'; Nattawut 87'; Suárez (yellow card) 89'	Stadium: True Stadium; Attendance: 2,568; Referee: Mongkolchai Pechsri

21 November 2020 12	Trat	2–3	True Bangkok United	Trat
18.30 UTC+7	Suan Lam Mang (yellow card) 27'; Ricardo Santos (yellow card) 52'; Kriangkrai (yellow card) 69'; Mongkol 90'; Aguinaldo (red card) 90+4'	Report	Sanrawat 12'; Peerapat (yellow card) 31'; Hosogai (yellow card) 33'; Brenner 41'; Warut (yellow card) 74'; Nattawut 80'	Stadium: Trat Province Stadium; Attendance: 2,555; Referee: Tastarawut Khantavichai

29 November 2020 13	True Bangkok United	1–1	Police Tero	Pathum Thani
18.00 UTC+7	Everton (yellow card) 63'; Nattawut 67'	Report	Kanokpon 25'; Prasit (yellow card) 34'; Houla (yellow card) 45+1'; Narong (yellow card) 64'; Ekkachai (yellow card) 81'	Stadium: True Stadium; Attendance: 2,181; Referee: Noppadech Muangngam

12 December 2020 14	True Bangkok United	1–2	Buriram United	Pathum Thani
18.00 UTC+7	Vander (yellow card) 31' , (goal) 63'; Everton (yellow card) 76'; Bihr (yellow card) 89'	Report	Kanyuk (yellow card) 28'; Kelić (yellow card) 53' , (goal) 73'; Jakkaphan 60'; Pansa (yellow card) 90+5'	Stadium: True Stadium; Attendance: 4,323; Referee: Sarayut Jakngeon

19 December 2020 15	Rayong	1–0	True Bangkok United	Rayong
17.00 UTC+7	Theppitak (yellow card) 53'; Kirati (yellow card) 55'; Sirisak 68'; Suwat (red card) 90+5'	Report	Bihr (red card) 90+5'	Stadium: Rayong Province Stadium; Attendance: 1,650; Referee: Tastarawut Khantavichai

26 December 2020 16	True Bangkok United	2–2	SCG Muangthong United	Pathum Thani
18.00 UTC+7	Chananan 54'; Pokklaw 72'	Report	Mirzaev 68'; Derley 77'	Stadium: True Stadium; Attendance: 0 Referee: Sahapob Sriboonlue

7 February 2021 17	True Bangkok United	3–0	Samut Prakan City	Pathum Thani
19.00 UTC+7	Vander 49'; Nattawut 59'; Putthinan 75'	Report	Toti (yellow card) 27'; Saksit (yellow card) 83'	Stadium: True Stadium; Attendance: 0 Referee: Torphong Somsing

10 February 2021 18	Chiangrai United	1–1	True Bangkok United	Chiang Rai
18.00 UTC+7	Wasan (yellow card) 20'; Suriya (yellow card) 47'; Ji-hun (yellow card) 56'; Bill 65' (pen.)	Report	Peerapat (yellow card) 30'; Tristan 52'; Thossawat (yellow card) 60'	Stadium: Singha Stadium; Attendance: 0 Referee: Noppadet Muangngam

13 February 2021 19	True Bangkok United	2–1	Ratchaburi Mitr Phol	Pathum Thani
17.00 UTC+7	Heberty 9'; Chananan 14'	Report	Ekkaluck (yellow card) 31'; Kiatisak (yellow card) 49'; Roller 77' (pen.)	Stadium: True Stadium; Attendance: 0 Referee: Tastarawut Khantavichai

17 February 2021 20	Suphanburi	2–3	True Bangkok United	Suphan Buri
--:-- UTC+7	Caion 7'; Sarayut (yellow card) 19'; Shin-young (yellow card) 38'; Prasit (yellow card) 64'; Alef (yellow card) 77'; Assumpção 83'	Report	Pokklaw 17'; Heberty 32', 80' , (yellow card) 79'; Falkesgaard (yellow card) 56'	Stadium: Suphan Buri Provincial Stadium; Attendance: 0 Referee: Kotchapoom Meesridecha

20 February 2021 21	BG Pathum United	1–1	True Bangkok United	Pathum Thani
19.00 UTC+7	Pathompol 26'; Túñez (yellow card) 90+2'; Tossaphol (yellow card) 90+4'	Report	Peerapat (yellow card) 58'; Nattawut 67'	Stadium: Leo Stadium; Attendance: 0 Referee: Warintorn Sassadee

25 February 2021 22	True Bangkok United	5–1	Chonburi	Pathum Thani
19.00 UTC+7	Pokklaw 20'; Nattawut 40'; Thossawat 52'; Putthinan 67'; Vander 90+3' (pen.)	Report	Rangsan (yellow card) 42'; Narutchai (yellow card) 55'; Sittichok (yellow card) 59'; Jaycee John 88'	Stadium: True Stadium; Attendance: 0 Referee: Mongkolchai Pechsri

28 February 2021 23	Sukhothai	0–1	True Bangkok United	Sukhothai
18.30 UTC+7	Ekkasit (yellow card) 38'; Natthaphon (yellow card) 49'; Sila (yellow card) 90+3'	Report	Vander 18' , (yellow card) 90+2'; Hosogai (yellow card) 81'	Stadium: Thung Thalay Luang Stadium; Attendance: 0 Referee: Songkran Bunmeekiat

3 March 2021 24	True Bangkok United	2–3	Nakhon Ratchasima	Pathum Thani
18.30 UTC+7	Nattawut 13'; Pokklaw (yellow card) 43' , (red card) 65'; Heberty 64'; Vander (yellow card) 83'	Report	Dennis (yellow card) 14' , (goal) 18'; Abdulhafiz (yellow card) 45'; Tatchanon (yellow card) 62'; Decha (yellow card) 67'; Chitchanok 75', 90+4'; Nattapong (yellow card) 89'	Stadium: True Stadium; Attendance: 1,071; Referee: Phairot Bunkamnoed

7 March 2021 25	Port	2–2	True Bangkok United	Bangkok
18.00 UTC+7	Jaturapat (yellow card) 24'; Boli (yellow card) 39' , (goal) 44'; Suárez (yellow card) 41' , (goal) 69' (pen.)	Report	Nattawut (yellow card) 46'; Everton 52'; Hosogai (yellow card) 67'; Heberty 80' (pen.); Peerapat (yellow card) 90+4'	Stadium: PAT Stadium; Attendance: 1,353; Referee: Anusorn Nookaew

10 March 2021 26	True Bangkok United	5–0	Trat	Pathum Thani
18.00 UTC+7	Anon 12'; Everton 31'; Heberty 51', 79'; Thossawat 86'	Report	Aguinaldo (yellow card) 42'	Stadium: True Stadium; Attendance: 1,009; Referee: Kotchapoom Meesridecha

13 March 2021 27	Police Tero	1–2	True Bangkok United	Bangkok
18.30 UTC+7	Bošković 43'; Supot (yellow card) 44'; Chalermsak (yellow card) 90+4'	Report	Vander 10'; Hosogai (yellow card) 67'; Everton (yellow card) 74'; Nattawut 90+7'	Stadium: Boonyachinda Stadium; Attendance: 1,242; Referee: Sahapob Sriboonlue

18 March 2021 28	Buriram United	2–0	True Bangkok United	Buriram
19.00 UTC+7	Supachai 9'; Tinnakorn (yellow card) 45+2'; Maicon (yellow card) 49'; Jakkaphan 90+4'	Report	Wisarut (yellow card) 60'	Stadium: Chang Arena; Attendance: 8,028; Referee: Wiwat Jumpaoon

21 March 2021 29	True Bangkok United	4–1	Rayong	Pathum Thani
17.00 UTC+7	Bihr 33'; Nattawut 57'; Heberty 60'; Anon 67'	Report	Anuson 90+2'	Stadium: True Stadium; Attendance: 1,207; Referee: Paisan Bendem-alee

28 March 2021 30	PT Prachuap	0–1	True Bangkok United	Prachuap Khiri Khan
18.00 UTC+7	Adun (yellow card) 17'; Wanchalerm (yellow card) 59'; Phumin (yellow card) 79'; Orahovac (yellow card) 85'	Report	Heberty (yellow card) 62' , (goal) 77' (pen.); Vander (yellow card) 79'; Rungrath (yellow card) 90+4'	Stadium: Sam Ao Stadium; Attendance: 2,084; Referee: Sivakorn Pu-udom

=== FA Cup ===
7 November 2020 First round	True Bangkok United	5–1	Kasem Bundit University	Pathum Thani
18.00 UTC+7	Brenner 24', 50'; Anthony (yellow card) 29'; Chananan 41', 44'; Anon 77'	Report	Dicko 53'	Stadium: True Stadium; Attendance: 726; Referee: Akom Jaroensuk

5 December 2020 Second Round	True Bangkok United	7–2	Chiangrai City	Pathum Thani
18.00 UTC+7	Chananan 9', 73'; Anon 19'; Rungrath 27', 50'; Putthinan 40'; Chayathorn 76'	Report	Rattanan (yellow card) 39'; Chaiyahan 44'; Patiwat (yellow card) 29'; Nantawat 76'	Stadium: True Stadium; Attendance: 1,238; Referee: Paisan Bendem-alee

3 February 2021 Third Round	Udon United	0–2	True Bangkok United	Mueang, Udon Thani
15.00 UTC+7	Adisak (yellow card) 29'; Tebnimit (yellow card) 67'; Jardel (yellow card) 71'	Report	Nattawut 51', 62'; Vander (yellow card) 61'; Peerapat (yellow card) 65'; Wisarut (yellow card) 68'	Stadium: Thailand National Sports University Udon Thani Campus Stadium; Attendance: 0 Referee: Songkran Bunmeekiat

3 April 2021 Quarter Finals	True Bangkok United	2–1	Ratchaburi Mitr Phol	Pathum Thani
19.00 UTC+7	Heberty 24'; Vander (yellow card) 45+2'; Thossawat (yellow card) 57'; Peerapat 84'	Report	Karaboué (yellow card) 28'; Kritsananon (yellow card) 31'; Simon 54'; Langil (yellow card) 58'; Jae-sung (yellow card) 74'	Stadium: True Stadium; Attendance: 3,025; Man of the Match: Chaireag Ngam-som

7 April 2021 Semi-finals	True Bangkok United	1–2	Chiangrai United	Bangkok
19.00 UTC+7	Wisarut (yellow card) 25'; Thossawat (yellow card) 65'; Mika 74'; Vander (yellow card) 90+5'	Report	Chaiyawat 38'; Tanasak (yellow card) 76'; Ji-hun (yellow card) 79'; Bill 86'; Saranon (yellow card) 90+5'	Stadium: Boonyachinda Stadium; Attendance: 1,132; Referee: Torphong Somsing

== Statistics ==
=== Appearances and goals ===
No.	Pos	Nat	Player	Total		Thai League 1		FA Cup	
No.	Pos	Nat	Player	Apps	Goals	Apps	Goals	Apps	Goals
Goalkeepers
1	GK	(Philippines) PHI	Michael Falkesgaard	30	0	27	0	3	0
34	GK	(Thailand) THA	Warut Mekmusik	6	0	3+1	0	2	0
52	GK	(Thailand) THA	Supanat Suadsong	0	0	0	0	0	0
Defenders
3	DF	(Brazil) BRA	Everton	33	3	27+1	3	5	0
4	DF	(Thailand) THA	Manuel Bihr	29	3	27	3	2	0
5	DF	(Thailand) THA	Putthinan Wannasri	25	2	11+10	2	3+1	0
16	DF	(Thailand) THA	Mika Chunuonsee	11	1	3+6	0	0+2	1
19	DF	(Thailand) THA	Tristan Do	33	1	29	1	4	0
24	DF	(Thailand) THA	Wanchai Jarunongkran	9	0	5+3	0	1	0
26	DF	(Thailand) THA	Peerapat Notchaiya	27	1	23	0	4	1
31	DF	(Thailand) THA	Jakkit Wachpirom	2	0	0	0	1+1	0
51	DF	(Thailand) THA	Kritsada Nontharat	1	0	0	0	0+1	0
Midfielders
6	MF	(Thailand) THA	Anthony Ampaipitakwong	20	0	9+7	0	3+1	0
7	MF	(Japan) JPN	Hajime Hosogai	28	1	26+2	1	0	0
8	MF	(Thailand) THA	Wisarut Imura	22	0	8+9	0	3+2	0
10	MF	(Brazil) BRA	Vander	29	7	26	7	3	0
11	MF	(Thailand) THA	Anon Amornlerdsak	29	6	9+16	4	1+3	2
17	MF	(Thailand) THA	Rungrath Poomchantuek	11	2	0+8	0	2+1	2
21	MF	(Thailand) THA	Chayathorn Tapsuvanavon	3	1	0+1	0	0+2	1
28	MF	(Thailand) THA	Thossawat Limwannasathian	31	4	15+12	4	4	0
29	MF	(Thailand) THA	Sanrawat Dechmitr	20	2	11+7	2	1+1	0
33	MF	(Thailand) THA	Jirayu Niamthaisong	1	0	0	0	0+1	0
39	MF	(Thailand) THA	Pokklaw Anan	29	3	24+1	3	4	0
Forwards
14	FW	(Thailand) THA	Nattawut Suksum	32	14	21+8	12	3	2
20	FW	(Thailand) THA	Chananan Pombuppha	17	6	7+8	2	2	4
33	FW	(Thailand) THA	Jirayu Niamthaisong	1	0	0+1	0	0	0
37	FW	(Brazil) BRA	Heberty Fernandes	18	10	15	9	3	1
Players transferred out during the season
38	FW	(Brazil) BRA	Brenner Marlos	11	5	4+6	3	1	2
45	DF	(Thailand) THA	Santipap Yaemsaen	0	0	0	0	0	0
18	MF	(Thailand) THA	Alexander Sieghart	1	0	0+1	0	0	0

Last updated: 7 April 2021
Source: Competitions

=== Top scorers ===
Rank	No.	Pos.	Player	Thai League	FA Cup	Total
1	14	FW	(Thailand) Nattawut Suksum	12	2	14
2	37	FW	(Brazil) Heberty	9	1	10
3	10	FW	(Brazil) Vander Luiz	7	0	7
4	20	FW	(Thailand) Chananan Pombuppha	2	4	6
4	11	MF	(Thailand) Anon Amornlerdsak	4	2	6
5	38	FW	(Brazil) Brenner Marlos	3	2	5
6	28	MF	(Thailand) Thossawat Limwannasathian	4	0	4
7	39	MF	(Thailand) Pokklaw Anan	3	0	3
7	3	DF	(Brazil) Everton	3	0	3
7	4	DF	(Thailand) Manuel Bihr	3	0	3
8	29	MF	(Thailand) Sanrawat Dechmitr	2	0	2
8	28	MF	(Thailand) Rungrath Poomchantuek	0	2	2
8	5	DF	(Thailand) Putthinan Wannasri	2	0	2
9	7	MF	(Japan) Hajime Hosogai	1	0	1
9	21	MF	(Thailand) Chayathorn Tapsuvanavon	0	1	1
9	19	DF	(Thailand) Tristan Do	1	0	1
9	26	DF	(Thailand) Peerapat Notchaiya	0	1	1
9	16	DF	(Thailand) Mika Chunuonsee	0	1	1
Own goals				1	0	1
Total				57	17	74

Last updated: 7 April 2021
Source: Competitions

=== Top assist ===
Rank	No.	Pos.	Player	Thai League	FA Cup	Total
1	8	MF	(Brazil) Vander Luiz	13	2	15
2	19	MF	(Thailand) Tristan Do	6	0	6
3	39	MF	(Thailand) Pokklaw Anan	3	1	4
4	29	MF	(Thailand) Sanrawat Dechmitr	1	2	3
4	11	MF	(Thailand) Anon Amornlerdsak	2	1	3
4	26	DF	(Thailand) Peerapat Notchaiya	3	0	3
5	33	MF	(Thailand) Jirayu Niamthaisong	0	2	2
5	17	MF	(Thailand) Rungrath Poomchantuek	0	2	2
5	3	DF	(Brazil) Everton	1	1	2
5	24	DF	(Thailand) Wanchai Jarunongkran	2	0	2
5	8	MF	(Thailand) Wisarut Imura	2	0	2
6	38	FW	(Brazil) Brenner Marlos	1	0	1
6	20	FW	(Thailand) Chananan Pombuppha	0	1	1
6	5	DF	(Thailand) Putthinan Wannasri	1	0	1
6	14	FW	(Thailand) Nattawut Suksum	1	0	1
6	37	FW	(Brazil) Heberty Fernandes	1	0	1
6	16	DF	(Thailand) Mika Chunuonsee	1	0	1
6	11	MF	(Thailand) Anon Amornlerdsak	0	1	1
Total				38	13	51

Last updated: 7 April 2021
Source: Competitions

=== Clean sheets ===
Rank	No.	Pos.	Player	Thai League	FA Cup	Total
1	1	GK	(Philippines) Michael Falkesgaard	5	1	6
2	34	GK	(Thailand) Warut Mekmusik	1	0	1
Total				6	1	7

Last updated: 7 April 2021
Source: Competitions

=== Disciplinary record ===
As of match played 7 April 2021

No.	Pos.	Player	Thai League			FA Cup			Total		
No.	Pos.	Player	Booked	(yellow card) (yellow-red card)	Sent off (straight red)	Booked	(yellow card) (yellow-red card)	Sent off (straight red)	Booked	(yellow card) (yellow-red card)	Sent off (straight red)
1	GK	(Philippines) Michael Falkesgaard	2	0	0	0	0	0	2	0	0
3	DF	(Brazil) Everton	4	0	0	0	0	0	4	0	0
4	DF	(Thailand) Manuel Bihr	3	0	1	0	0	0	3	0	1
5	DF	(Thailand) Putthinan Wannasri	1	0	0	0	0	0	1	0	0
6	MF	(Thailand) Anthony Ampaipitakwong	0	0	0	1	0	0	1	0	0
7	MF	(Japan) Hajime Hosogai	6	0	0	0	0	0	6	0	0
8	MF	(Thailand) Wisarut Imura	1	0	0	2	0	0	3	0	0
10	MF	(Brazil) Vander	4	0	0	3	0	0	7	0	0
11	MF	(Thailand) Anon Amornlerdsak	2	0	0	0	0	0	2	0	0
14	FW	(Thailand) Nattawut Suksum	3	0	0	0	0	0	3	0	0
17	MF	(Thailand) Rungrath Poomchantuek	1	0	0	0	0	0	1	0	0
18	MF	(Thailand) Alexander Sieghart	1	0	0	0	0	0	1	0	0
19	DF	(Thailand) Tristan Do	3	1	0	0	0	0	2	0	0
24	DF	(Thailand) Wanchai Jarunongkran	1	0	0	0	0	0	1	0	0
26	DF	(Thailand) Peerapat Notchaiya	5	0	0	1	0	0	6	0	0
28	MF	(Thailand) Thossawat Limwannasathian	1	0	0	2	0	0	3	0	0
29	MF	(Thailand) Sanrawat Dechmitr	3	0	0	0	0	0	3	0	0
34	GK	(Thailand) Warut Mekmusik	1	0	0	0	0	0	1	0	0
37	MF	(Brazil) Heberty	1	0	0	0	0	0	1	0	0
39	MF	(Thailand) Pokklaw Anan	2	1	1	0	0	0	0	0	1
Total			45	2	2	9	0	0	54	2	2

=== Monthly awards ===
Month	Player of the Month	Coach of the Month	Reference
February	(Japan) Hajime Hosogai		
