= 2024–25 Bangkok United F.C. season =

Bangkok United F.C.
2024–25 season
- Chairman: (Thailand) Kajorn Chearavanont
- Manager: (Thailand) Totchtawan Sripan
- Stadium: Thammasat Stadium
- Thai League: 2nd
- FA Cup: Round of 16
- League Cup: Quarter-Final
- AFC Champions League Two: Round of 16
- Top goalscorer: League: Muhsen Al-Ghassani; All: Muhsen Al-Ghassani
- Biggest win: 5-0 (Bangkok United vs Khonkaen United) (Thai League 1, 30 March 2025)
- Biggest defeat: 4–2 (Buriram United vs Bangkok United) (Thai League 1, 18 August 2024)
Home colours	Away colours	Third colours

The 2024–25 season is Bangkok United Football Club's 16th in the new era since they took over from Bangkok University Football Club in 2009. It is the 8th season in the Thai League and the club's 14th (11th consecutive) season in the top flight of the Thai football league system since returning in the 2013 season. The team will also play in the qualifying round of the newly form AFC Champion League Elite against Shandong from China.

== Squad ==
=== Thai League 1 Squad ===
As of 2 August 2024.

Squad No.	Name	Nationality	Position(s)	Date of birth (age)	Last club
Goalkeepers
1	Patiwat Khammai	(Thailand)	GK	24 December 1994 (age 31)	(Thailand) Samut Prakan City F.C.
34	Warut Mekmusik	(Thailand)	GK	21 February 1992 (age 34)	(Thailand) Air Force United F.C.
52	Supanut Suadsong	(Thailand)	GK	21 February 1992 (age 34)	Youth Team
Defenders
2	Peerapat Notchaiya	(Thailand)	LB / LWB	4 February 1993 (age 33)	(Thailand) Muangthong United F.C.
3	Everton Gonçalves (C)	(Brazil)	CB	5 February 1990 (age 36)	(Thailand) Chiangrai United F.C.
4	Manuel Bihr	(Thailand) (Germany)	CB	17 August 1993 (age 32)	(Germany) Stuttgarter Kickers
6	Nitipong Selanon	(Thailand)	RB	25 May 1993 (age 32)	(Thailand) Chiangrai United F.C.
21	Pratama Arhan	(Indonesia)	LB	21 December 2001 (age 24)	(South Korea) Suwon
24	Wanchai Jarunongkran	(Thailand)	LB	18 December 1996 (age 29)	(Thailand) Police Tero F.C.
26	Suphan Thongsong	(Thailand)	CB	26 August 1994 (age 31)	(Thailand) Suphanburi F.C.
36	Jakkapan Praisuwan	(Thailand)	CB / DM	16 August 1994 (age 31)	(Thailand) Muangthong United
96	Boontawee Theppawong	(Thailand)	RB	2 January 1996 (age 30)	(Thailand) Muangthong United F.C.
Midfielders
8	Wisarut Imura	(Thailand)	CM / DM	18 October 1997 (age 28)	(Thailand) Air Force United F.C.
10	Bassel Jradi	(Lebanon) (Denmark)	CM / AM	6 July 1993 (age 32)	(Cyprus) Apollon Limassol FC
11	Rungrath Poomchantuek	(Thailand)	RW / LW	17 May 1992 (age 33)	(Thailand) Ratchaburi Mitr Phol F.C.
18	Thitiphan Puangchan	(Thailand)	CM	1 September 1993 (age 32)	(Thailand) BG Pathum United F.C.
27	Weerathep Pomphan	(Thailand)	CM / DM	19 September 1996 (age 29)	(Thailand) Muangthong United F.C.
28	Thossawat Limwannasathian	(Thailand)	CM / DM	17 May 1993 (age 32)	(Thailand) Muangthong United F.C.
39	Pokklaw Anan	(Thailand)	CM / AM	4 March 1991 (age 35)	(Thailand) Chonburi F.C.
Strikers
16	Muhsen Al-Ghassani	(Oman)	FW	27 March 1997 (age 29)	(Oman) Al-Seeb Club
19	Chayawat Srinawong	(Thailand)	FW / SS	12 January 1993 (age 33)	(Thailand) Samut Prakan City F.C.
30	Richairo Zivkovic	(Netherlands) (Curaçao)	FW / LW	15 September 1996 (age 29)	(Singapore) Lion City Sailors
77	Luka Adžić	(Serbia)	FW / LW	17 September 1998 (age 27)	(Serbia) FK Čukarički
90	Philip Bijawat Frey	(Thailand) (Germany)	CM	25 November 2006 (age 19)	Youth Team
93	Mahmoud Eid	(Palestine) (Sweden)	FW	26 June 1993 (age 32)	(Thailand) Nongbua Pitchaya F.C.
Players loaned out during season
5	Putthinan Wannasri	(Thailand)	CB / RB / LB	5 September 1992 (age 33)	(Thailand) Suphanburi F.C.
7	Anon Amornlerdsak	(Thailand)	RW / LW / AM	6 November 1997 (age 28)	(Thailand) Bangkok Glass F.C.
20	Guntapon Keereeleang	(Thailand)	FW / SS	22 January 2001 (age 25)	Youth Team
44	Natcha Promsomboon	(Thailand)	CM	8 February 2001 (age 25)	(Thailand) Ayutthaya Utd.
59	Chukid Wanpraphao	(Thailand)	FW	2 July 2001 (age 24)	(Thailand) Ayutthaya Utd.
Players left during season
21	Chayathorn Tapsuvanavon	(Thailand)	CM / DM	12 March 2000 (age 26)	Youth Team

=== U23 Squad ===
As of 2 August 2023.

Squad No.	Name	Nationality	Position(s)	Date of birth (age)	Last club
Goalkeepers
1	Supanut Sudathip	(Thailand)	GK	22 June 2006 (age 19)	Youth Team
12	Naphol Wongboon	(Thailand)	GK	26 April 2004 (age 22)	Youth Team
25	Phattharaphon Kaewwongthong	(Thailand)	GK		Youth Team
Defenders
2	Kittisak Dangsakul	(Thailand)	CB	14 October 2005 (age 20)	Youth Team
3	Anaphat Nakngam	(Thailand)	CB	9 July 2004 (age 21)	Youth Team
4	Wichan Inaram	(Thailand) (Nigeria)	RB	20 July 2007 (age 18)	Youth Team
5	Warakoan Huatwiset	(Thailand)	RB	28 October 2005 (age 20)	Youth Team
7	Chonlachart Tongjinda	(Thailand)	RB	31 March 2005 (age 21)	Youth Team
15	Nontapat Ploymee	(Thailand)	LB		Youth Team
18	Surachai Booncharee	(Thailand)	LB	26 April 2007 (age 19)	Youth Team
20	Kongpop Sodsong	(Thailand)	CB		Youth Team
21	Putharapol Sanprasit	(Thailand)	CB		Youth Team
Midfielders
6	Sirayos Dansakul	(Thailand)	CM		Youth Team
8	Natcha Promsomboon	(Thailand)	CM	8 February 2001 (age 25)	(Thailand) Ayutthaya Utd.
14	Shunta Hasegawa	(Thailand) (Japan)	CM	25 April 2005 (age 21)	Youth Team
16	Philip Bijawat Frey	(Thailand) (Germany)	CM	25 November 2006 (age 19)	Youth Team
18	Aekkarat Sansuwan	(Thailand)	CM		Youth Team
19	Krit Kliangpan	(Thailand)	CM		Youth Team
22	Pichaiya Kongsri	(Thailand)	CM	3 August 2007 (age 18)	Youth Team
23	Patchara Wangsawat	(Thailand)	CM	4 September 2007 (age 18)	Youth Team
24	Thanawat Deeloed	(Thailand)	CM		Youth Team
Strikers
9	Guntapon Keereeleang	(Thailand)	FW	22 January 2001 (age 25)	Youth Team
10	Chukid Wanpraphao	(Thailand)	FW	2 July 2001 (age 24)	(Thailand) Ayutthaya Utd.
11	Nopparat Promiem	(Thailand)	FW		Youth Team
13	Napat Kuttanan	(Thailand)	FW	10 February 2005 (age 21)	Youth Team

== Coaching staff ==
Position	Staff
Team Manager	(Thailand) Suradej Anandapong
Head coach	(Thailand) Totchtawan Sripan
Assistant coach	(Thailand) Panupong Wongsa
Assistant coach	(Thailand) Sarif Sainui
Goalkeeping coach	(Thailand) Peerasit Mahothon
Assistant goalkeeper coach	(Thailand) Kittinan Chockcharoenlarp
Physical & Fitness coaches	(Thailand) Watcharachai Rajphaetyakhom
Physical & Fitness coaches	(Thailand) Tosaphon Doungjai
Head of Medicine	(Brazil) Janilson Quadros da silva
Physiotherapist	(Thailand) Mongkhon Saethao
Interpreter	(Thailand) Nuttapat Lertchanapisit
Team's Staff	(Thailand) Chatchai Phuengthong
Team's Staff	(Thailand) Ayuwat Duangin
Director of academy	(Australia) Danny Invincibile
Under-23s lead coach	(Thailand) Jirawat Lainananukul

== Transfer ==
=== Pre-season transfer ===
==== In ====
Position	Player	Transferred from	Ref
FW	(Oman) Muhsen Al-Ghassani	(Oman) Al-Seeb Club	Free
FW	(Serbia) Luka Adžić	(Serbia) FK Čukarički	Free
FW	(Netherlands) (Curaçao) Richairo Zivkovic	(Singapore) Lion City Sailors	Free

==== Loan return ====
Position	Player	Transferred from	Ref
GK	(Thailand) Phuwadol Pholsongkram	(Thailand) Ayutthaya United	Loan Return
DF	(Thailand) Atsadawut Changthong	(Thailand) Ayutthaya United	Loan Return
DF	(Thailand) Pakkapol Maimard	(Thailand) Ayutthaya United	Loan Return
DF	(Thailand) Bhumchanok Kamkla	(Thailand) Samut Prakan	Loan Return
MF	(Thailand) Jesadaporn Nimnon	(Thailand) Samut Prakan	Loan Return
MF	(Thailand) Nantawat Kokfai	(Thailand) Ayutthaya United	Loan Return
MF	(Thailand) Chayathorn Tapsuvanavon	(Thailand) Ayutthaya United	Loan Return
MF	(Thailand) Natcha Promsomboon	(Thailand) Ayutthaya United	Loan Return
MF	(Thailand) Jedsadakorn Kowngam	(Thailand) Nakhon Si United	Loan Return
MF	(Thailand) Tharadon Sornyoha	(Thailand) Suphanburi	Loan Return
FW	(Thailand) Nattakit Butsing	(Thailand) Samut Prakan	Loan Return
FW	(Thailand) Pasakorn Biawtungnoi	(Thailand) Ayutthaya United	Loan Return
FW	(Thailand) Nattawut Suksum	(Thailand) Ayutthaya United	Loan Return
FW	(Thailand) Chukid Wanpraphao	(Thailand) Ayutthaya United	Loan Return

==== Out ====
Position	Player	Transferred To	Ref
MF	(Thailand) Tassanapong Muaddarak	(Thailand) Sukhothai	Free
MF	(Thailand) Ratchanat Arunyapairot	(Thailand) Sukhothai	Free
FW	(Thailand) Adisak Kraisorn	(Thailand) Kasetsart	Free
FW	(Thailand) Nattawut Suksum	(Thailand) BG Pathum United	Free
FW	(Brazil) Willen	(Thailand) Port	Free
FW	(Brazil) Vander Luiz	(Thailand) PT Prachuap	Free
FW	(France) Amadou Soukouna	(South Africa) Cape Town City	Free

=== Mid-season transfer ===
==== In ====
Position	Player	Transferred from	Ref
DF	(Indonesia) Pratama Arhan	(South Korea) Suwon	Free
DF	(Thailand) Jakkapan Praisuwan	(Thailand) BG Pathum United	Free

==== Out ====
Position	Player	Transferred To	Ref
MF	(Thailand) Chayathorn Tapsuvanavon	(Thailand) Chonburi	Free

==== Loan out ====
Position	Player	Transferred To	Ref
DF	(Thailand) Putthinan Wannasri	(Thailand) Rayong F.C.	Season loan
MF	(Thailand) Anon Amornlerdsak	(Thailand) Port F.C.	Season loan
MF	(Thailand) Natcha Promsomboon	(Thailand) Ayutthaya United	Season loan
FW	(Thailand) Chukid Wanpraphao	(Thailand) Ayutthaya United	Season loan
FW	(Thailand) Guntapon Keereeleang	(Thailand) Ayutthaya United	Season loan

=== Post-season transfer ===
==== Out ====
Position	Player	Transferred To	Ref
MF	(Lebanon) (Denmark) Bassel Jradi		Free

== Competitions ==
=== Overview ===
Competition	First match	Last match	Starting round	Final position	Record							
Competition	First match	Last match	Starting round	Final position	Pld	W	D	L	GF	GA	GD	Win %
Thai League	9 August 2024	30 April 2025	Matchday 1	2nd	30	21	6	3	63	30	+33	70.00
FA Cup	20 November 2024	9 April 2025	First Round	Round of 16	3	2	0	1	7	3	+4	66.67
League Cup	30 October 2024	16 April 2025	First Round	Quarter-finals	3	2	0	1	5	3	+2	66.67
AFC Champions League Elite	13 August 2024		Playoff Stage		1	0	1	0	1	1	+0	0.00
AFC Champions League Two	18 September 2024	19 February 2025	Group stage	Round of 16	8	4	2	2	16	11	+5	50.00
Total					45	29	9	7	92	48	+44	64.44

Last updated: 2 April 2025
Source: Competitions

=== Thai League 1 ===
==== League table ====
Pos	Team	Pld	W	D	L	GF	GA	GD	Pts	Qualification
1	Buriram United (C)	30	22	4	4	92	20	+72	70	Qualification for AFC Champions League Elite League stage
2	Bangkok United	30	21	6	3	63	30	+33	69	Qualification for AFC Champions League Elite qualifiers
3	BG Pathum United	30	15	8	7	47	34	+13	53	Qualification for AFC Champions League Two group stage
4	Ratchaburi	30	15	7	8	65	47	+18	52	Qualification for AFC Champions League Two group stage
5	Port	30	13	9	8	52	39	+13	48	

Source: Thai League
Rules for classification: Season in progress: 1) Points; 2) Goal difference; 3) Goals scored; End of season: 1) Points; 2) Head-to-head points; 3) Head-to-head goal difference; 4) Goals scored.
(C) Champions

==== Results overview ====
Overall								Home						Away					
Pld	W	D	L	GF	GA	GD	Pts	W	D	L	GF	GA	GD	W	D	L	GF	GA	GD
27	18	6	3	54	27	+27	60	9	4	0	28	12	+16	9	2	3	26	15	+11

Matchday	1	2	3	4	5	6	7	8	9	10	11	12	13	14	15	16	17	18	19	20	21	22	23	24	25	26	27	28	29	30
Ground	H	A	H	A	H	A	A	H	A	H	A	H	A	A	A	H	A	H	A	H	H	A	H	A	H	A	H	H	H	A
Result	W	L	D	W	W	D	W	D	W	W	W	W	W	L	L	W	W	D	W	W	D	W	W	W	W	D	W	W	W	W
Position	6	9	8	4	3	4	3	3	3	3	1	1	1	1	2	2	2	2	2	2	2	2	2	2	2	2	2	2	2	2

A = Away; H = Home; W = Win; D = Draw; L = Loss

==== Matches ====
Win Draw Loss

9 August 2024 1	Bangkok United	2–1	PT Prachuap	Pathum Thani
	Peerapat Notchaiya 45+5'; Thitiphan Puangchan 79'; Nitipong Selanon (yellow card) 36'; Weerathep Pomphan (yellow card) 50'; Bassel Jradi (yellow card) 86'		Vander 54'; Airton Tirabassi (yellow card) 45'; Amirali Chegini (yellow card) 68'; Sanukran Thinjom (yellow card) 90+3'	Stadium: Thammasat Stadium; Attendance: 2,004; Referee: Putthipong Issising

18 August 2024 2	Buriram United	4–2	Bangkok United	Buriram
	Crispim 27'; Bissoli 56' 76'; Seksan 90+4' (yellow card) 90+3'		Al-Ghassani 16'; Nitipong 53' (yellow card) 26'; Suphan Thongsong (yellow card) 26'	Stadium: Chang Arena; Attendance: 25,093; Referee: Jirawit Phonkaew

25 August 2024 3	Bangkok United	0–0	Uthai Thani	Pathum Thani
	Weerathep Pomphan (yellow card) 90+5'		Ben Davis (yellow card) 38'; Júlio César (yellow card) 45+3'; Jhonatan Agudelo (yellow card) 68'	Stadium: Thammasat Stadium; Attendance: 2,181; Referee: Songkran Bunmeekiart

29 August 2024 4	Nakhon Pathom United	0–3	Bangkok United	Nakhon Ratchasima
	Valdo (yellow card) 90+5'		Mahmoud Eid 34'; Richairo Zivkovic 43' (pen.) (yellow card) 62'; Pokklaw Anan 87'	Stadium: 80th Birthday Stadium; Attendance: 2,329; Referee: Sivakorn Pu-udom

1 September 2024 5	Bangkok United	3–2	Lamphun Warriors	Pathum Thani
	Bassel Jradi 37'; Richairo Zivkovic 59' (yellow card) 50'; Mahmoud Eid 89'		Jefferson Assis 64'; Victor Cardozo 86' (pen.); Nuttee Noiwilai (yellow card) 35'; Thossaporn Chuchin (yellow card) 66'	Stadium: Thammasat Stadium; Attendance: 2,051; Referee: Paisan Bendem-Alee

14 September 2024 6	Nakhon Ratchasima Mazda	1–1	Bangkok United	Nakhon Ratchasima
	Anurak Mungdee 86'; Somkaet Kunmee (yellow card) 64'; Deyvison (yellow card) 64'		Richairo Zivkovic 69'; Bassel Jradi (yellow card) 61'	Stadium: 80th Birthday Stadium; Attendance: 10,211; Referee: Sarayut Jakngoen

22 September 2024 7	Rayong	0–3	Bangkok United	Rayong
			Muhsen Al-Ghassani 27'; Mahmoud Eid 30'; Nitipong Selanon 45' (yellow card) 50'; Peerapat Notchaiya (yellow card) 68'; Everton Gonçalves (red card) 76'; Richairo Zivkovic (yellow card) 78'; Weerathep Pomphan (yellow card) 90+3'	Stadium: Rayong Province Stadium; Attendance: 2,382; Referee: Veeraporn Maophaeo

27 September 2024 8 (Rescheduled)	Bangkok United	0–0	Ratchaburi	Pathum Thani
	Peerapat Notchaiya (yellow card) 32'; Weerathep Pomphan (yellow card) 90+4'		Mohamed Mara (yellow card) 90+3'	Stadium: Thammasat Stadium; Attendance: 1,433; Referee: Putthipong Issising

6 October 2024 9 (Rescheduled)	Nongbua Pitchaya	2–3	Bangkok United	Nongbua
	Jakkrawut Songma 27'; Abo Eisa 90+7'; Wutthichai Marom (yellow card) 4'; Kittikun Jamsuwan (yellow card) 56'; Jorge Fellipe (yellow card) 84'		Mahmoud Eid 67'; Muhsen Al-Ghassani 73' (pen.), 87'; Pokklaw Anan (yellow card) 46'	Stadium: Pitchaya Stadium; Attendance: 3,710; Referee: Chaireag Ngamsom

20 October 2024 10 (Rescheduled)	Bangkok United	4–1	Sukhothai	Pathum Thani
	Pokklaw Anan 17'; Suphan Thongsong 60'; Richairo Zivkovic 69' (pen.) (yellow card) 67'; Everton Gonçalves 89'; Pokklaw Anan (yellow card) 53'		Matheus Fornazari Custódio 86'; Adisak Seebunmee (yellow card) 26'; Mateus Lima (red card) 45'	Stadium: Thammasat Stadium; Attendance: 1,676; Referee: Akom Charoensuk

27 October 2024 11 (Rescheduled)	Chiangrai United	1–2	Bangkok United	Chiangrai
	Carlos Iury 34'; Banphakit Phrmanee (yellow card) 44'; Atikun Mheetuam (yellow card) 53'; Sittichok Kannoo (yellow card) 63'; Thakdanai Jaihan (yellow card) 75'; Victor Oliveira (yellow card) 85'		Suphan Thongsong 23'; Muhsen Al-Ghassani 31'; Thossawat Limwannasathian (yellow card) 48'; Wanchai Jarunongkran (yellow card) 52'; Warut Mekmusik (yellow card) 88'; Weerathep Pomphan (yellow card) 90+8'	Stadium: Singha Chiangrai Stadium; Attendance: 3,972; Referee: Warintorn Sassadee

2 November 2024 12 (Rescheduled)	Bangkok United	2–0	Port	Pathum Thani
	Bassel Jradi 11'; Muhsen Al-Ghassani 72' (pen.)		Frans Putros (yellow card) 61'; Worawut Srisupha (yellow card) 69'	Stadium: Thammasat Stadium; Attendance: 3,843; Referee: Anusorn Nookaew

10 November 2024 13 (Rescheduled)	Khon Kaen United	2–3	Bangkok United	Chiangrai
	Jakkit Palapon 41'; Chitsanuphong Choti 57'; Brenner (yellow card) 90+9'		Richairo Zivkovic 9'; Bassel Jradi 32'; Muhsen Al-Ghassani 45+2' (yellow card) 90+8'; Weerathep Pomphan (yellow card) 90'	Stadium: Khon Kaen Stadium; Attendance: 3,972; Referee: Chaikrit Inboonsong

23 November 2024 14 (Rescheduled)	Muangthong United	2–1	Bangkok United	Nonthaburi
	Songwut Kraikruan 19'; Felicio Brown Forbes 76'; Abbos Otakhonov (yellow card) 63'		Richairo Zivkovic 40'; Weerathep Pomphan (yellow card) 53'; Thitiphan Puangchan (yellow card) 55'	Stadium: Thunderdome Stadium; Attendance: 5,173; Referee: Thapakorn Thongkon

1 December 2024 15 (Rescheduled)	BG Pathum United	1–0	Bangkok United	Pathum Thani
	Ikhsan Fandi 90+4' (yellow card) 90'		Muhsen Al-Ghassani (yellow card) 53'	Stadium: BG Stadium; Attendance: 10,180; Referee: Sivakorn Pu-udom

12 January 2025 16 (Rescheduled)	Bangkok United	3–2	Buriram United	Pathum Thani
	Bassel Jradi 14' (yellow card) 78'; Al-Ghassani 39'; Nitipong Selanon 90+2' (yellow card) 90+2'; Mahmoud Eid (yellow card) 55'		Supachai Chaided 45+1'; Guilherme Bissoli 65'; Goran Čaušić (yellow card) 83'; Theerathon Bunmathan (yellow card) 87'	Stadium: BG Stadium (Note: Bangkok United played their home matches at BG Stadium, Pathum Thani, instead of their regular home stadium Thammasat Stadium, Bangkok because their home stadium is not available on the day.); Attendance: 7,093; Referee: Torphong Somsing

16 January 2025 17 (Rescheduled)	Uthai Thani	0–2	Bangkok United	Uthai Thani
			Richairo Zivkovic 50' (yellow card) 59'; Muhsen Al-Ghassani 63' (yellow card) 42'	Stadium: Uthai Thani Province Stadium; Attendance: 3,009; Referee: Songkran Bunmeekiart

20 January 2025 18 (Rescheduled)	Bangkok United	1–1	Nakhon Pathom United	Pathum Thani
	Peerapat Notchaiya 9'; Suphan Thongsong (yellow card) 57'		Jennarong Phupha 59' (yellow card) 37'; Taku Ito (yellow card) 73'	Stadium: Thammasat Stadium; Attendance: 1,377; Referee: Peerasan Krataithong

25 January 2025 19	Lamphun Warriors	0–1	Bangkok United	Lamphun
	Tawan Khotrsupho (yellow card) 76'; Anan Yodsangwal (yellow card) 88'		Mahmoud Eid 32'; Pratama Arhan (yellow card) 12'; Weerathep Pomphan (yellow card) 45+1'; Bassel Jradi (yellow card) 45+4'; Pokklaw Anan (yellow card) 70'	Stadium: Lamphun Province Stadium; Attendance: 3,050; Referee: Songkran Bunmeekiart

2 February 2025 20	Bangkok United	2–1	Nakhon Ratchasima Mazda	Pathum Thani
	Muhsen Al-Ghassani 26' 71'; Everton (yellow card) 9'		Deyvison 42'; Weerawat Jirapaksiri (yellow card) 54'; Natthanan Biasamrit (yellow card) 83'	Stadium: Thammasat Stadium; Attendance: 1,299; Referee: Niwat Insa-ard

7 February 2025 21 (Rescheduled)	Bangkok United	2–2	Rayong	Pathum Thani
	Mahmoud Eid 34', 58' (yellow card) 71'; Pratama Arhan (yellow card) 90'		Hae-Min Jeon 10'; Lwin Moe Aung 28'; Bruno Cantanhede (yellow card) 68'; Reungyos Janchaichit (yellow card) 90+6'	Stadium: Thammasat Stadium; Attendance: 1,201; Referee: Peerasan Krataithong

2 April 2025 22 (Rescheduled)	Ratchaburi	1–2	Bangkok United	Ratchaburi
	Thanawat Suengchitthawon 13'; Chotipat Poomkaew (yellow card) 90'; Shinnaphat Leeaoh (yellow card) 90+5'		Thitiphan Puangchan 11'; Everton 70'; Mahmoud Eid (yellow card) 48'; Peerapat Notchaiya (yellow card) 60'	Stadium: Dragon Solar Park; Referee: Jirawit Phonkaew

22 February 2025 23	Bangkok United	1–0	Nongbua Pitchaya	Pathum Thani
	Mahmoud Eid 70'; Pratama Arhan (yellow card) 45+2'; Thitiphan Puangchan (red card) 67'; Weerathep Pomphan (yellow card) 74'; Muhsen Al-Ghassani (yellow card) 90+6'		Chawin Thirawatsri (red card) 90+3'	Stadium: Thammasat Stadium; Attendance: 1,251; Referee: Winat Phophat

2 March 2025 24 (Rescheduled)	Sukhothai	1–3	Bangkok United	Sukhothai
	Matheus Fornazari Custódio 76'; Surawich Logarwit (yellow card) 44'		Mahmoud Eid 24', 74'; Richairo Zivkovic 65' (pen.) (yellow card) 30'; Everton (yellow card) 76'	Stadium: Thalay Luang Stadium; Attendance: 2,045; Referee: Woottipong Ketkam

8 March 2025 25	Bangkok United	3–2	Chiangrai United	Pathum Thani
	Mahmoud Eid 32'; Nitipong Selanon 36' (yellow card) 73'; Muhsen Al-Ghassani 90+6' (pen.) (yellow card) 90+15'; Richairo Zivkovic (yellow card) 42'		Jordan Emaviwe 24'; Júlio César 44' (yellow card) 90+4'; Gionata Verzura (yellow card) 87'; Ralph (yellow card) 90+13'	Stadium: Thammasat Stadium; Attendance: 1,320; Referee: Peerasan Krataithong

16 March 2025 26	Port	0–0	Bangkok United	Bangkok
	Frans Putros (yellow card) 12'; Teerasak Poeiphimai (yellow card) 84'		Mahmoud Eid (yellow card) 53'; Thitiphan Puangchan (yellow card) 66'	Stadium: PAT Stadium; Attendance: 5,906; Referee: Akom Charoensuk

30 March 2025 27	Bangkok United	5–0	Khon Kaen United	Pathum Thani
	Richairo Zivkovic 20'; Bassel Jradi 41'; Diego Landis 43' (o.g.); Luka Adžić 77', 85'			Stadium: Thammasat Stadium; Attendance: 1,218; Referee: Komgrit Ponpasit

5 April 2025 28	Bangkok United	2–1	Muangthong United	Pathum Thani
	Muhsen Al-Ghassani 6'; Luka Adžić 70' (yellow card) 14'; Thitiphan Puangchan (yellow card) 66'		Kakana Khamyok 41'	Stadium: Thammasat Stadium; Attendance: 3,031; Referee: Akom Charoensuk

19 April 2025 29	Bangkok United	3–0	BG Pathum United	Pathum Thani
	Luka Adžić 34'; Muhsen Al-Ghassani 69' (pen.); Thitiphan Puangchan 90+6'		Kritsada Kaman (yellow card) 79'; Waris Choolthong (yellow card) 90+5'	Stadium: Thammasat Stadium; Attendance: 4,076; Referee: Wiwat Jumpaoon

30 April 2025 30 (Rescheduled)	PT Prachuap	2–4	Bangkok United	Prachuap Khiri Khan
	Chrigor 14'; Saharat Kanyaroj 26'; Airton Tirabassi (yellow card) 90+5'		Rungrath Poomchantuek 65'; Mahmoud Eid 69' (yellow card) 90+6'; Muhsen Al-Ghassani 76' (pen.); Thitiphan Puangchan 90+11'; Pratama Arhan (yellow card) 90+2'; Richairo Zivkovic (yellow card) 90+9'	Stadium: Sam Ao Stadium; Referee: Chae Sang-hyeop (South Korea)

=== Thai FA Cup ===
Win Draw Loss

20 November 2024 Round of 64	Bangkok United	3–1	Pattaya United (T2)	Pathum Thani
	Thossawat Limwannasathian 17' (yellow card) 71'; Richairo Živković 23'; Mahmoud Eid 77'; Wisarut Imura (yellow card) 78'		Narakorn Khana 7'; Abdolreza Zarei (yellow card) 61'; Taned Benyapad (yellow card) 90+1'; Patrick Cruz (yellow card) 90+1'	Stadium: Thammasat Stadium; Attendance: 605; Referee: Phairot Bunkamnoed

29 January 2025 Round of 32	Bangkok United	3–0	Nongbua Pitchaya	Pathum Thani
	Muhsen Al-Ghassani 68', 85'; Mahmoud Eid 89'			Stadium: Thammasat Stadium; Attendance: 10,500; Referee: Songkran Bunmeekiart

9 April 2025 Round of 16	Bangkok United	1–2 (a.e.t.)	Muangthong United	Pathum Thani
	Rungrath Poomchantuek 104'		Theerapat Nanthakowat 96'; Poramet Arjvirai 118'	Stadium: Thammasat Stadium; Attendance: 1,279; Referee: Sivakorn Pu-udom

=== Thai League Cup ===
30 October 2024 Round of 32	(T2) Kasetsart	1–3	Bangkok United	Bangkok
	Brinner 42'		Anon Amornlerdsak 45'; Thossawat Limwannasathian 58'; Anon Amornlerdsak 76'; Putthinan Wannasri (yellow card) 23'	Stadium: Insee Chantarasatit Stadium; Attendance: 1,714; Referee: Kotchapoom Meesridaecha

26 February 2025 Round of 16	(T2) Chainat Hornbill	0–1	Bangkok United	Chainat
	Nawinmet Chaewchan (yellow card) 53'; Chatchai Wongwnarai (yellow card) 58'; Panumek Palalec (yellow card) 68'; Bazil Samakkij (yellow card) 73'		Manuel Bihr 90+1'; Muhsen Al-Ghassani (yellow card) 69'; Peerapat Notchaiya (red card) 90+5'	Stadium: Khao Plong Stadium; Attendance: 952; Referee: Woottipong Ketkam

16 April 2025 Quarter Final	Bangkok United	1–2 (a.e.t.)	Buriram United	Pathum Thani
	Thitiphan Puangchan 90+6' (yellow card) 44'; Patiwat Khammai (yellow card) 40'; Everton (yellow card) 45+2'; Pratama Arhan (yellow card) 75'		Peter Žulj 61'; Guilherme Bissoli 113'; Kenny Dougall (yellow card) 108'; Neil Etheridge (yellow card) 118'	Stadium: Thammasat Stadium; Attendance: 3,834; Referee: Sarayut Jakngoen

=== AFC Champions League Elite ===
==== Qualifying stage ====
13 August 2024 Playoff	Shandong Taishan (China)	1–1 (a.e.t.) (4–3 p)	(Thailand) Bangkok United	Jinan, China
	Valeri Qazaishvili 43'	Report	Richairo Zivkovic 37'	Stadium: Jinan Olympic Sports Center Stadium; Referee: Omar Al-Ali (United Arab Emirates)
	Penalties
	Zheng Zheng (penalty scored); Valeri Qazaishvili (penalty scored); Li Yuanyi (penalty missed); Zhang Chi (penalty scored); Marcel Scalese (penalty scored)		Richairo Zivkovic (penalty missed); Rungrath Poomchantuek (penalty scored); Everton (penalty scored); Muhsen Al-Ghassani (penalty scored); Thossawat Limwannasathian (penalty missed)

=== AFC Champions League Two ===
==== Group stage ====
Pos	Team	Pld	W	D	L	GF	GA	GD	Pts	Qualification	BKU	NDI	TAM	LMC
1	(Thailand) Bangkok United	6	4	1	1	12	6	+6	13	Advance to round of 16	—	3–2	4–2	4–1
2	(Vietnam) Nam Định	6	3	2	1	13	8	+5	11	Advance to round of 16	0–0	—	3–2	3–0
3	(Singapore) Tampines Rovers	6	2	2	2	11	11	0	8		1–0	3–3	—	3–1
4	(Hong Kong) Lee Man	6	0	1	5	2	13	−11	1		0–1	0–2	0–0	—

Source: AFC
Rules for classification: Tiebreakers

18 September 2024 1	Bangkok United (Thailand)	4–2	(Singapore) Tampines Rovers	Rangsit, Thailand
	Muhsen Al-Ghassani 45+2', 63'; Richairo Zivkovic 77' (pen.); Bassel Jradi 90+5'		Seia Kunori 53', 72'; Miloš Zlatković (yellow card) 60'	Stadium: Thammasat Stadium; Attendance: 899; Referee: Pranjal Banerjee (India)

2 October 2024 2	Nam Dinh (Vietnam)	0–0	(Thailand) Bangkok United	Nam Định, Vietnam
		Report		Stadium: Thiên Trường Stadium; Attendance: 11,818; Referee: Mohammed Al-Shammari (Qatar)

24 October 2024 3	Lee Man (Hong Kong)	0–1	(Thailand) Bangkok United	Mong Kok, Hong Kong
	Ryoya Tachibana (yellow card) 66'; Dudu (yellow card) 77'	Report	Bassel Jradi 28'; Richairo Živković (yellow card) 45'; Weerathep Pomphan (yellow card) 76'	Stadium: Mong Kok Stadium; Attendance: 892; Referee: Ismaeel Habib Ali (Bahrain)

6 November 2024 4	Bangkok United (Thailand)	4–1	(Hong Kong) Lee Man	Rangsit, Thailand
	Richairo Zivkovic 67', 90+3'; Wanchai Jarunongkran 73'; Muhsen Al-Ghassani 78'	Report	Samuel Rosa 41'; Wong Chun Ho (yellow card) 59'	Stadium: Thammasat Stadium; Attendance: 1,241; Referee: Mohammad Ghabayen (Jordan)

27 November 2024 5	Tampines Rovers (Singapore)	1–0	(Thailand) Bangkok United	Kallang, Singapore
	Seia Kunori 61'	Report	Weerathep Pomphan (yellow card) 88'	Stadium: Jalan Besar Stadium; Attendance: 1,026; Referee: Ahmed Issa (United Arab Emirates)

4 December 2024 6	Bangkok United (Thailand)	3–2	(Vietnam) Nam Dinh	Rangsit, Thailand
	Luka Adžić 35'; Muhsen Al-Ghassani 45+2' (pen.) (yellow card) 70'; Bassel Jradi 83'; Wisarut Imura (yellow card) 68'; Peerapat Notchaiya (yellow card) 74'; Weerathep Pomphan (yellow card) 90+3'	Report	Rafaelson 29', 89' (pen.); Lucas Alves (yellow card) 53'; Lý Công Hoàng Anh (yellow card) 70'	Stadium: Thammasat Stadium; Referee: Khamis Al-Marri (Qatar)

==== Knockout stage ====
12 February 2025 R16 Leg 1	Sydney (Australia)	2–2	(Thailand) Bangkok United	Sydney, Australia
	Adrian Segecic 60', 79'; Harrison Devenish-Meares (yellow card) 49'	Report	Richairo Zivkovic 50' (pen.); Thitiphan Puangchan 90+6'	Stadium: Jubilee Stadium; Attendance: 5,131; Referee: Yoshimi Yamashita (Japan)

19 February 2025 R16 Leg 2	Bangkok United (Thailand)	2–3 (a.e.t.) (4–5 agg.)	(Australia) Sydney	Rangsit, Thailand
	Muhsen Al-Ghassani 18'; Mahmoud Eid 54' (yellow card) 33'; Thitiphan Puangchan (yellow card) 49' (yellow-red card)	Report	Joe Lolley 2'; Adrian Segecic 88'; Douglas Costa 100' (yellow card) 100'; Joel King (yellow card) 46'; Leo Sena (yellow card) 64'; Alex Grant (yellow card) 90'; Rhyan Grant (yellow card) 110'	Stadium: Thammasat Stadium; Referee: Ilgiz Tantashev (Uzbekistan)

== Statistics ==
=== Appearances and goals ===
@ 30 Apr 2025

No.	Pos.	Player	Thai League		FA Cup		League Cup		AFC Champions League Elite		AFC Champions League Two		Total	
No.	Pos.	Player	Apps.	Goals	Apps.	Goals	Apps.	Goals	Apps.	Goals	Apps.	Goals	Apps.	Goals
1	GK	(Thailand) Patiwat Khammai	29	0	1+1	0	1	0	1	0	8	0	41	0
2	DF	(Thailand) Peerapat Notchaiya	17+5	2	2	0	1	0	1	0	6+1	0	33	2
3	DF	(Brazil) Everton Gonçalves	27+1	2	3	0	1+1	0	1	0	8	0	42	2
4	DF	(Thailand) (Germany) Manuel Bihr	11+7	0	2	0	3	1	0	0	5	0	28	1
6	DF	(Thailand) Nitipong Selanon	22+5	4	0+1	0	1+2	0	1	0	7	0	39	4
8	MF	(Thailand) Wisarut Imura	10+6	0	1	0	1	0	0+1	0	1+3	0	23	0
10	MF	(Lebanon) (Denmark) Bassel Jradi	14+7	5	2	0	1	0	1	0	3+2	3	30	8
11	MF	(Thailand) Rungrath Poomchantuek	14+12	1	1+1	1	1+1	0	0+1	0	1+5	0	37	2
16	MF	(Oman) Muhsen Al-Ghassani	21+6	14	1	2	3	0	0+1	0	7+1	5	40	21
18	MF	(Thailand) Thitiphan Puangchan	20+7	4	3	0	2	0	1	0	7	1	40	5
19	FW	(Thailand) Chayawat Srinawong	3+10	0	0+1	0	1	0	0	0	0+2	0	17	0
21	DF	(Indonesia) Pratama Arhan	6+5	0	0+1	0	0+1	0	0	0	0+2	0	15	0
24	DF	(Thailand) Wanchai Jarunongkran	7+8	0	1+1	0	1+2	0	0+1	0	2+2	1	25	1
26	DF	(Thailand) Suphan Thongsong	21+4	2	1	0	2	0	1	0	2+2	0	33	2
27	MF	(Thailand) Weerathep Pomphan	19+3	0	2	0	1+1	0	1	0	6+1	0	34	0
28	MF	(Thailand) Thossawat Limwannasathian	9+6	0	1	1	1	1	0+1	0	2+3	0	23	2
30	FW	(Netherlands) (Curaçao) Richairo Zivkovic	22+5	9	2+1	1	0+2	0	1	1	7	4	40	15
34	GK	(Thailand) Warut Mekmusik	1+1	0	2	0	2	0	0	0	0	0	6	0
36	DF	(Thailand) Jakkapan Praisuwan	7+6	0	2	0	0+1	0	0	0	0+1	0	17	0
39	MF	(Thailand) Pokklaw Anan	22+7	2	1+2	0	3	0	1	0	7+1	0	44	2
51	DF	(Thailand) Kritsada Nontharat	2+11	0	0	0	1	0	0+1	0	1+2	0	18	0
52	GK	(Thailand) Supanut Suadsong	0	0	0	0	0	0	0	0	0	0	0	0
77	FW	(Serbia) Luka Adžić	6+10	4	1	0	2+1	0	0	0	1+3	1	24	5
90	FW	(Thailand) (Germany) Philip Bijawat Frey	0+1	0	0	0	0	0	0	0	0	0	1	0
93	FW	(Palestine) (Sweden) Mahmoud Eid	18+6	12	3	2	0+1	0	1	0	6+1	0	36	14
96	DF	(Thailand) Boontawee Theppawong	1+1	0	1	0	2	0	0	0	0	0	5	0
Players who have played this season but had left the club on loan to other club
5	DF	(Thailand) Putthinan Wannasri	0+1	0	0	0	1	0	0	0	0	0	2	0
7	MF	(Thailand) Anon Amornlerdsak	0	0	0	0	1	1	0	0	0	0	1	1
20	FW	(Thailand) Guntapon Keereeleang	0+4	0	0+1	0	0+1	0	0	0	0+2	0	8	0
44	MF	(Thailand) Natcha Promsomboon	0	0	0	0	0+1	0	0	0	0	0	1	0
59	FW	(Thailand) Chukid Wanpraphao	0+1	0	0	0	0+1	1	0	0	0	0	1	1
Players who have played this season but had left the club permanently
21	MF	(Thailand) Chayathorn Tapsuvanavon	0	0	0	0	0	0	0	0	0	0	0	0
