= 2018 Bangkok United F.C. season =

Bangkok United F.C.
2018 season
- Chairman: Kajorn Chearavanont
- Manager: Alexandré Pölking
- Stadium: Thammasat Stadium, Khlong Luang, Pathum Thani, Thailand
- Thai League T1: 2nd
- Thai FA Cup: First Round
- Thai League Cup: Second Round
- Top goalscorer: League: Robson dos Santos Fernandes (14); All: Robson dos Santos Fernandes (14)
Home colours	Away colours	Third colours

The 2018 season is Bangkok United Football Club's 10th existence in the new era since they took over from Bangkok University Football Club in 2009. It is the 3rd season in the Thai League and club's 8th (6th consecutive) season in the top flight of the Thai football league system since returned in the 2013 season.

== League by seasons ==
Season	League	Position	Notes
2009	Thai Premier League	13th	Began of the new era by competed as Bangkok United F.C.
2010	Thai Premier League	15th	Relegated to Thai Division 1 League
2011	Thai Division 1 League	6th	
2012	Thai Division 1 League	3rd	Promoted to Thai Premier League
2013	Thai Premier League	13th	
2014	Thai Premier League	8th	
2015	Thai Premier League	5th	
2016	Thai League	2nd	Thai Premier League renamed to Thai League
2017	Thai League	3rd	
2018	Thai League	2nd	

== Competitions ==
=== Thai League ===
Date	Opponents	H / A	Result F–A	Scorers	League position
10 February 2018	SCG Muangthong United	H	2–3	Sumanya 27', Pokklaw 52'	11th
17 February 2018	Police Tero	A	2–1	Sumanya 74', Ekkachai 89'	7th
25 February 2018	Suphanburi	H	2–2	Robson 19', Sumanya 56'	9th
4 March 2018	Ratchaburi Mitr Phol	A	2–1	Vander 57', Sumanya 67'	5th
10 March 2018	Buriram United	H	2–2	Teeratep 11', Robson 55'	7th
16 March 2018	Pattaya United	A	4–3	Ekkachai 51', Vander (2) 58' (pen.), 81', Sumanya 90'	6th
28 March 2018	PT Prachuap	A	1–1	Robson 84'	7th
1 April 2018	Chiangrai United	H	0–1		9th
7 April 2018	Port	A	3–0	Everton 9', Robson 27', Sumanya 62'	6th
11 April 2018	Nakhon Ratchasima Mazda	H	2–0	Robson 20', Ekkachai 63'	3rd
20 April 2018	Bangkok Glass	A	1–0	Piyachanok 90' (o.g.)	2nd
25 April 2018	Navy	H	5–2	Surachet 17', Sumanya 30', Robson 33', Vander 71', Teeratep 84' (pen.)	2nd
29 April 2018	Ubon UMT United	A	3–0	Everton 6', Robson 75', Salom 90+3'	2nd
6 May 2018	Chonburi	H	2–1	Everton 56', Sumanya 84'	2nd
13 May 2018	Sukhothai	A	4–1	Robson 45+2', Everton 53', Mika 86', Teeratep 90+3'	2nd
19 May 2018	Air Force Central	A	1–0	Robson 34'	2nd
26 May 2018	Chainat Hornbill	H	1–0	Everton 65'	2nd
10 June 2018	Police Tero	H	2–1	Vander 36', Sumanya 42'	2nd
16 June 2018	Suphanburi	A	2–1	Teeratep 21' (pen.), Mika 42'	1st
23 June 2018	Ratchaburi Mitr Phol	H	1–1	Teeratep 30'	2nd
30 June 2018	Buriram United	A	1–2	Robson 5'	2nd
7 July 2018	Pattaya United	H	1–2	Sanrawat 48'	2nd
14 July 2018	PT Prachuap	H	0–0		2nd
21 July 2018	Chiangrai United	A	2–1	Robson 17', Rungrath 76'	2nd
29 July 2018	Port	H	2–1	Sumanya 82', Pokklaw 90+3'	2nd
5 August 2018	Nakhon Ratchasima Mazda	A	0–0		2nd
5 September 2018	Bangkok Glass	H	3–2	Mika 31', Everton 45+1', Robson 87'	2nd
8 September 2018	Navy	A	4–0	Pooladi 15', Sittichok 41', Sumanya 60', Teeratep 79'	2nd
12 September 2018	Ubon UMT United	H	1–0	Manuel 39'	2nd
16 September 2018	Chonburi	A	4–2	Putthinan 16', Everton 44', Sanrawat 45+1', Robson 82'	2nd
23 September 2018	Sukhothai	H	2–3	Pokklaw 68', Teeratep 87'	2nd
29 September 2018	Air Force Central	H	6–2	Robson 29', Ekkachai 32', Sumanya 50', Teeratep (2) 79', 87', Rungrath 88'	2nd
3 October 2018	Chainat Hornbill	A	0–0		2nd
7 October 2018	SCG Muangthong United	A	0–0		2nd

Pos	Team	Pld	W	D	L	GF	GA	GD	Pts	Qualification or relegation
1	Buriram United (C, Q)	34	28	3	3	76	25	+51	87	Qualification to 2019 AFC Champions League Group stage
2	Bangkok United (Q)	34	21	8	5	68	36	+32	71	Qualification to 2019 AFC Champions League Preliminary round 2
3	Port	34	19	4	11	73	45	+28	61	
4	Muangthong United	34	16	11	7	65	53	+12	59	
5	Chiangrai United (Q)	34	15	10	9	52	36	+16	55	Qualification to 2019 AFC Champions League Preliminary round 2 (Note: Chiangrai United qualified to the 2019 AFC Champions League Preliminary round 2 as winners of the 2018 Thai FA Cup.)

Source: Thai League
Rules for classification: 1) Points; 2) Head-to-head points; 3) Head-to-head goals difference; 4) Head-to-head goals scored; 5) Overall goals difference; 6) Overall goals scored; 7) Fair play points; 8) Play-off without extra time;).
(C) Champions; (Q) Qualified for the phase indicated

=== Thai FA Cup ===
Date	Opponents	H / A	Result F–A	Scorers	Round
27 June 2018	Buriram United	A	0–0 (a.e.t.) (7–8p)		Round of 64

=== Thai League Cup ===
Date	Opponents	H / A	Result F–A	Scorers	Round
13 June 2018	Samut Sakhon	A	5–0	Teeratep 5' (pen.), Sittichok 16', Jakkapan (2) 75', 82', Nattawut 81'	Round of 32
11 July 2018	Ranong United	A	1–2 (a.e.t.)	Vander 2'	Round of 16

== Squad statistics ==
No.	Pos.	Name	League		FA Cup		League Cup		Total		Discipline	
No.	Pos.	Name	Apps	Goals	Apps	Goals	Apps	Goals	Apps	Goals	Yellow card	Red card
1	GK	(Philippines) Michael Falkesgaard	32	0	0	0	0	0	32	0	0	0
2	DF	(Thailand) Ekkachai Sumrei	14+11	4	0+1	0	2	0	16+12	4	2	0
3	DF	(Brazil) Everton Gonçalves	32	7	1	0	1	0	34	7	7	1
4	DF	(Thailand) Manuel Bihr	29	1	1	0	0	0	30	1	2	0
5	DF	(Thailand) Putthinan Wannasri	21+3	1	1	0	1	0	23+3	1	2	0
6	DF	(Thailand) Anthony Ampaipitakwong	28+2	0	1	0	0	0	29+2	0	5	0
8	FW	(Brazil) Vander Luíz	29+2	5	1	0	1	1	31+2	6	6	1
10	MF	(Thailand) Pokklaw Anan	12+5	3	0	0	0	0	12+5	3	2	0
11	MF	(Thailand) Sumanya Purisai	28+3	12	1	0	1	0	30+3	12	2	1
13	DF	(Thailand) Ernesto Phumipha	3+1	0	0	0	0	0	3+1	0	1	0
14	FW	(Thailand) Teeratep Winothai	14+11	9	0	0	2	1	16+11	10	3	0
16	DF	(Thailand) Mika Chunuonsee	28+1	2	0	0	1	0	29+1	2	2	0
17	MF	(Thailand) Rungrath Poomchantuek	10+3	2	1	0	0	0	11+3	2	1	0
18	DF	(Thailand) Alexander Sieghart	1+6	0	0+1	0	2	0	3+7	0	1	0
19	MF	(Thailand) Phattharaphol Khamsuk	0+1	0	0	0	0	0	0+1	0	0	0
21	MF	(Thailand) Sathaporn Daengsee	2+5	0	0+1	0	1+1	0	3+7	0	0	0
22	FW	(Palestine) Carlos Salóm	1+7	1	0	0	1	0	2+7	1	0	0
23	FW	(Thailand) Sittichok Kannoo	3+2	1	0	0	1	1	4+2	2	0	0
24	DF	(Thailand) Wanchai Jarunongkran	6+1	0	0	0	2	0	8+1	0	1	1
26	GK	(Thailand) Warut Wongsomsak	0	0	0	0	0	0	0	0	0	0
28	MF	(Thailand) Thossawat Limwannasathian	8+5	0	0	0	2	0	10+5	0	2	0
29	MF	(Thailand) Sanrawat Dechmitr	30+3	1	1	0	0	0	31+3	1	4	0
30	FW	(Brazil) Robson Fernandes	30	14	1	0	1	0	32	14	9	0
34	GK	(Thailand) Warut Mekmusik	2+1	0	1	0	2	0	5+1	0	0	0
35	MF	(Thailand) Siripong Kongjaopha	0+3	0	0	0	0	0	0+3	0	0	0
36	MF	(Thailand) Jedsadakorn Kowngam	0	0	0	0	0	0	0	0	0	0
37	MF	(Thailand) Wisarut Imura	0+1	0	0	0	0	0	0+1	0	0	0
38	DF	(Thailand) Worawut Sathaporn	0	0	0	0	0	0	0	0	0	0
44	MF	(Thailand) Nattawut Suksum	1+2	0	0	0	2	1	3+2	1	0	0
87	MF	(Iran) Mehrdad Pooladi	4+2	1	1	0	0	0	5+2	1	1	0
98	GK	(Thailand) Sumethee Khokpho	0	0	0	0	1	0	0	0	0	0
—	—	Own goals	–	1	–	0	–	0	–	0	–	–

== Reserve team in Thai League 4 ==
Bangkok United F.C.'s reserve side Bangkok United F.C.(B) was sent to compete in the T4 Bangkok Metropolitan Region.

Date	Opponents	H / A	Result F–A	Scorers	League position
11 February 2018	Kopoon Warrior	A	3–2	Nattawut (2) 15', 63', Jirayu 51'	3rd
18 February 2018	Grakcu Sai Mai United	H	4-0	Carlos (2) 25' (pen.), 60', Thanat (2) 30', 70'	1st
24 February 2018	Samut Prakan	A	3-0	Jirayu 74', Thanat 74', Rachanon 90+3'	1st
5 March 2018	Port B	H	2-1	Jirayu 5', Carlos 48'	1st
18 March 2018	RSU	A	2-1	Jirayu 52', Sathaporn 90+2'	1st
25 March 2018	BGC	H	2–2	Ernesto 24', Nattawut 59'	2nd
31 March 2018	PTU Pathumthani	A	1-3	Jedsadakorn 10'	2nd
