= List of Bangkok United F.C. seasons =

This is a list of seasons played by Bangkok United Football Club in Thai and Asian football, from 2002, when the club was then known as Bangkok University to the most recent completed season.

== Seasons ==
Season	League									FA Cup	League Cup	Queen's Cup	Champ Cup	Asia	Top goalscorer	
Season	Division	P	W	D	L	F	A	Pts	Pos	FA Cup	League Cup	Queen's Cup	Champ Cup	Asia	Name	Goals
2002-03	DIV1	22	13	8	1	42	10	47	1st	—	—	—	—	—		
2003-04	TPL	18	9	4	5	26	22	31	4th	—	—	—	—	—		
2004-05	TPL	18	5	7	6	16	21	22	7th	—	—	—	—	—		
2006	TPL	22	11	6	5	25	17	39	1st	—	—	—	—	—		
2007	TPL	30	14	5	11	39	36	47	4th	—	—	—	—	AFC Champions League - GR Singapore Cup - SF		
2008	TPL	30	9	8	13	28	36	55	10th	—	—	—	—	Singapore Cup - QF	Suriya Domtaisong	8
2009	TPL	30	5	15	10	24	34	30	13th	QF	—	GR	—	—	Suphasek Kaikaew	4
2010	TPL	30	5	9	16	25	52	24	15th	R4	QF	—	—	—	Sarif Sainui	5
2011	DIV1	34	15	6	13	54	49	51	6th	R2	R1	—	—	—	Romain Gasmi	13
2012	DIV1	34	23	5	6	57	29	74	3rd	R3	R1	—	—	—	Romain Gasmi	17
2013	TPL	32	8	7	17	38	61	31	13th	R4	R1	—	—	—	Sompong Soleb	9
2014	TPL	38	15	9	14	55	56	54	8th	QF	R1	—	—	—	Romain Gasmi	12
2015	TPL	34	16	9	9	59	47	57	5th	R1	R2	—	—	—	Dragan Bošković	13
2016	TPL	31	26	2	3	72	36	75	2nd	R1	QF	—	—	—	Dragan Bošković	20
2017	TL	34	21	3	10	97	57	66	3rd	RU	R2	—	—	AFC Champions League - PR2	Dragan Bošković	38
2018	TL	34	21	8	5	68	36	71	2nd	R1	R2	—	—	—	Robson	14
2019	TL	30	13	11	6	55	32	50	4th	SF	QF	—	—	AFC Champions League - PR2	Nelson Bonilla	16
2020–21	TL	30	15	6	9	57	39	51	5th	SF	—	—	—	—	Nattawut Suksum	12
2021–22	TL	30	15	8	7	53	30	53	3rd	R3	QF	—	—	—	Heberty	15
2022–23	TL	30	19	5	6	55	22	62	2nd	RU	QF	—	—	—	Willen	11
2023–24	TL	30	17	10	3	58	24	61	2nd	W	R2	—	W	AFC Champions League - R16	Willen	20
2024–25	TL	30	21	6	3	63	30	69	2nd	R3	QF	—	—	AFC Champions League Elite - POR; AFC Champions League Two - R16	Muhsen Al-Ghassani	15

Champions	Runners-up	Promoted	Relegated

- P = Played
- W = Games won
- D = Games drawn
- L = Games lost
- F = Goals for
- A = Goals against
- Pts = Points
- Pos = Final position
- TPL = Thai Premier League
- TL = Thai League
- DIV1 = Thai Division 1 League
- QR1 = First Qualifying Round
- QR2 = Second Qualifying Round
- QR3 = Third Qualifying Round
- QR4 = Fourth Qualifying Round
- PR1 = Preliminary Round 1
- PR2 = Preliminary Round 2
- POR = Play-off Round
- RInt = Intermediate Round
- R1 = Round 1
- R2 = Round 2
- R3 = Round 3
- R4 = Round 4
- R5 = Round 5
- R6 = Round 6
- GR = Group Stage
- R16 = Round of 16
- QF = Quarter-finals
- SF = Semi-finals
- RU = Runners-up
- S = Shared
- W = Winners
