= Bassel Jradi =

Footballer (born 1993)

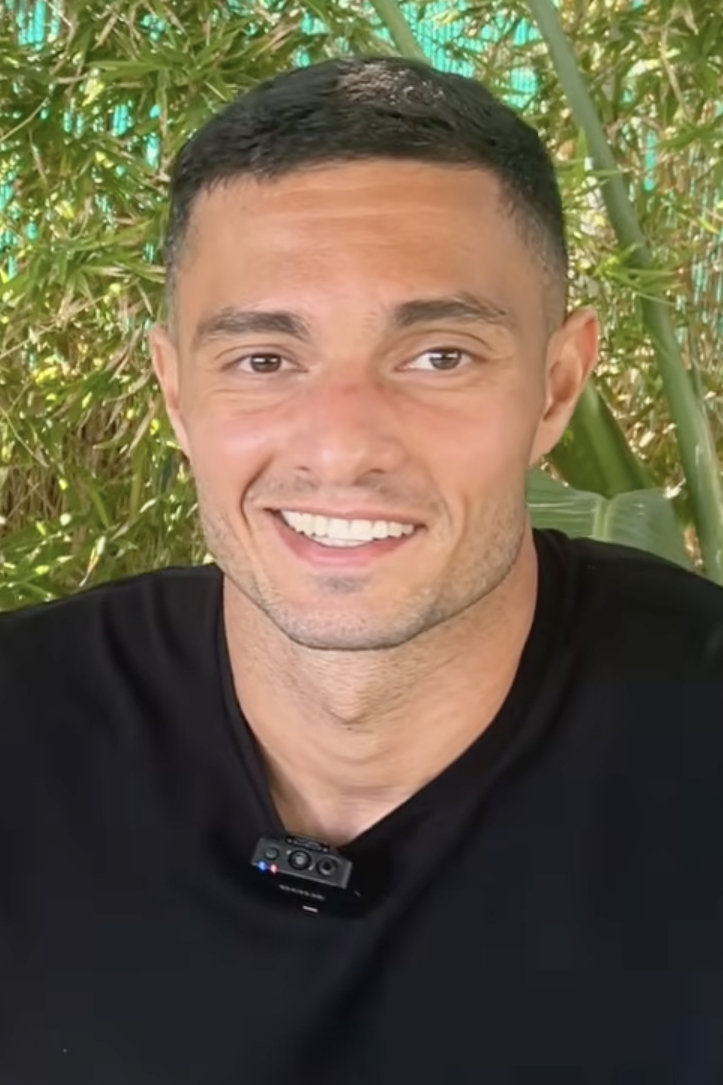
- Jradi in 2026

Personal information
- Full name: Bassel Zakaria Jradi
- Date of birth: 6 July 1993 (age 33)
- Place of birth: Copenhagen, Denmark
- Height: 1.87 m (6 ft 2 in)
- Positions: Attacking midfielder; winger

Team information
- Current team: B.93
- Number: 90

Youth career
- 1998–2000: Skjold
- 2000–2011: B.93

Senior career*
Years	Team	Apps	(Gls)
2011–2012	B.93	33	(8)
2012–2013	AB	28	(8)
2013–2014	FC Nordsjælland	4	(0)
2014–2015	Strømsgodset II	16	(9)
2014–2018	Strømsgodset	65	(14)
2016	→ Lillestrøm (loan)	26	(4)
2018–2021	Hajduk Split	73	(5)
2021–2023	Apollon Limassol	41	(6)
2023–2025	Bangkok United	38	(9)
2025–2026	AEL Limassol	17	(0)
2026–	B.93	9	(1)

International career^{‡}
2008–2009	Denmark U16	3	(0)
2010	Denmark U17	3	(0)
2010	Denmark U18	3	(0)
2011	Denmark U19	4	(0)
2012	Denmark U20	3	(0)
2012–2013	Denmark U21	7	(2)
2015–2024	Lebanon	26	(3)
- * Club domestic league appearances and goals as of 3 October 2026 ‡ National team caps and goals as of 16 December 2024

Bassel Zakaria Jradi (Arabic: باسل زكريا جرادي, Lebanese Arabic pronunciation: [ˈbeːsil zakaˈrijja ˈʒraːdi, -de]; born 6 July 1993) is a professional footballer who plays as an attacking midfielder or winger for Danish 2nd Division club B.93. Born in Denmark, he has played for the Lebanon national team.

Jradi began his senior career at B.93 in Denmark, later playing for AB and briefly for Nordsjælland. In 2014, he moved to Norway with Strømsgodset, had a loan spell at Lillestrøm, and enjoyed a standout 2017 season, earning a nomination for "People's Favourite Player" at the 2017 Fotballfesten. He joined Hajduk Split in Croatia in 2018, scoring in key matches including the Eternal derby, before leaving in 2021. Jradi then helped Cypriot club Apollon Limassol win the 2021–22 Cypriot league title, played for Bangkok United in Thailand in 2023, and moved back to Cyprus in 2025 to join AEL Limassol. Jradi returned to childhood club B.93 in 2026.

Internationally, Jradi represented Denmark at all youth levels from U16 to U21 before switching allegiance to Lebanon in 2015. He participated in the 2019 and 2023 AFC Asian Cups, scoring in the latter.

== Club career ==
=== B.93 ===
Jradi began his youth career at Skjold aged five. He moved to B.93 aged seven, and made his senior debut in the Danish 2nd Division on 30 April 2011 in the 2010–11 season, in a 4–2 home defeat to LFA. Jradi became the first player born after B.93's 100-year anniversary (19 May 1993) to debut for their first team. In the following match, he scored a brace and assisted once in a 4–2 win against Avarta.

Jradi started the 2011–12 season by scoring in his first two matches, against Hvidovre (2–1 defeat) and Skjold Birkerød (2–1 win). In the second-to-last game of the season, he was sent off in a 2–1 defeat against Svebølle (it was his second red card of the season); B.93 were relegated outside of the Danish league system for the first time. Jradi played 33 games and scored eight goals for B.93.

=== AB ===
Having gone on trial for Danish club OB and English club Blackburn Rovers in 2011, Jradi moved to Danish 1st Division side AB in summer 2012. He scored eight goals and made three assists, making him the club's top scorer of the season.

=== Nordsjælland ===
At the end of the 2012–13 season, Jradi signed a three-and-a-half-year contract with Superliga side Nordsjælland. He involvement was limited, only playing four league games and a match in the UEFA Europa League play-offs.

=== Strømsgodset and loan to Lillestrøm ===
In July 2014, Jradi was purchased by Tippeligaen side Strømsgodset, and signed a contract which lasted until the end of 2017.

In January 2016, he signed for fellow-Tippeligaen club Lillestrøm on loan until the end of the year, scoring four league goals in 26 games.

Thanks to his performances during the 2017 Eliteserien season with Strømsgodset, scoring 10 goals and assisting seven, Jradi was nominated for the "Folkets favorittspiller" (People's favourite player) award at the 2017 Fotballfesten, and made it to the final shortlist of four people.

=== Hajduk Split ===
==== 2018–19 season ====
On 11 August 2018, Jradi joined Croatian First League club Hajduk Split on a two-year deal. His first goal for the club came on 10 May 2019, in a 2–0 home win over Slaven. He scored once again in the following matchday, played four days later, against Rudeš in a 4–1 away win. Jradi ended the 2018–19 season with two goals in 25 appearances, helping his side finish fourth in the league.

==== 2019–20 season ====
On 18 July 2019, Jradi scored his first Europa League qualifier goal in the home game against Gżira United of Malta. However, his side lost on the away goals rule and were knocked out of the qualifiers. In the Eternal derby against Dinamo Zagreb in the league, on 31 August 2019, Jradi scored the lone goal in the 56th minute, before being sent off after receiving two yellow cards during the match. Thanks to his performance in the game, Jradi was nominated Man of the Match and helped his side reach the top of the table for the first time in 1,399 days. After the game, the player stated: "This was a crazy game with crazy fans. Incredible. Red cards, goals, everything was crazy".

On 29 June 2020, Hajduk Split extended Jradi's contract, which was due to expire in July, for an additional year. On 25 July 2020, Jradi scored from outside the box and assisted a goal against Inter Zaprešić in a 4–1 away win on the last matchday of the season. Jradi ended the season with three league goals in 32 games.

==== 2020–21 season ====
On 29 August 2020, in matchday 3 of the league, Jradi provided his first assist of the season against Slaven Belupo, in a 2–2 draw.

In February 2021, Jradi refused to renew his contract with Hajduk Split, wanting to move to another team on a free transfer the following summer transfer window. The management sent him to train with the reserves for the rest of the season as a form of "punishment". According to the Croatian Football Federation, however, he was unable to participate in official games as "a player older than 21 who has already played at least five games during the season for the first team cannot play for the B team".

On 21 May, Jradi and Hajduk Split agreed to terminate the contract on mutual consent; he scored seven goals in 81 games in all competitions in his three-year stay.

=== Apollon Limassol ===
On 22 June 2021, Jradi joined Cypriot First Division side Apollon Limassol. He scored on his club debut on 22 July, in a 3–1 defeat to Žilina in the 2021–22 UEFA Europa Conference League qualification. Jradi also scored in the away game against Žilina one week later, with the match ending 2–2. On 23 August, he scored in the first matchday of the 2021–22 league season, helping Apollon win 4–2 against Ethnikos Achna. In May 2022, Jradi was shortlisted in the 2021–22 PASP Football Awards as one of 11 nominees in the forward position. With three goals in 22 league games, he helped Apollon win the league title for the first time in 15 seasons.

Jradi left the club on 29 May 2023, making 51 appearances and scoring eight goals in two seasons at the club.

=== Bangkok United ===
On 27 July 2023, Thai League 1 side Bangkok United announced the signing of Jradi; he was assigned the number 10 kit. Jradi played 54 games and scored 13 goals in all competitions throughout his two seasons with Bangkok United.

=== AEL Limassol ===
On 15 June 2025, Jradi returned to the Cypriot First Division, signing for AEL Limassol. He played 17 league games and three cup games in 2025–26.

=== Return to B.93 ===
On 20 July 2026, Jradi returned to Danish 2nd Division club B.93, where he had begun his career, on a two-year contract.

== International career ==
Born in Copenhagen, Denmark to Lebanese parents, Jradi was eligible to play for both Denmark and Lebanon internationally.

=== Denmark ===
After impressing during his season with AB in 2012–13, Jradi represented Denmark internationally at under-20 and under-21 levels. He played for Denmark at all youth levels (from the under-16s to the under-21s) between 2008 and 2013, playing a combined 23 games and scoring twice.

=== Lebanon ===
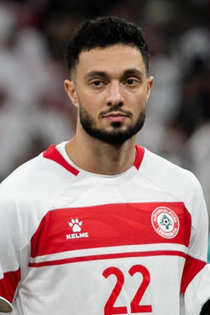
Jradi with Lebanon at the 2023 AFC Asian Cup

Eligible to represent Lebanon through his descent, Jradi made his debut for their senior team on 26 August 2015; he scored the temporary 2–1 goal in a friendly against Iraq, which eventually finished in a 3–2 defeat. After the match, regarding his national team choice between Lebanon and Denmark, he stated: "both countries mean a lot to me. It's a big decision".

Although in January 2018 Jradi had stated that he aimed to play for Denmark, in November of the same year he was called up for Lebanon for the friendly matches against Uzbekistan and Australia. In December 2018, he was called up for the 2019 AFC Asian Cup squad. After playing the whole 90 minutes in the first group stage game against Qatar, Jradi fell into a disagreement with coach Miodrag Radulović and was subsequently ruled out of the national team for the rest of the tournament.

On 5 September 2019, the Lebanese Football Association (LFA) announced Jradi's indefinite exclusion from the national team, alongside teammate Joan Oumari, for refusing a call-up for a 2022 FIFA World Cup qualifying match against North Korea. After issuing an apology explaining his reasons for refusing the call-up, the LFA lifted the exclusions and Jradi was reintegrated to the national team on 19 September.

In December 2023, Jradi was included in the Lebanese squad for the 2023 AFC Asian Cup. He scored in the final game of the group stage, against Tajikistan; Lebanon eventually lost 2–1 and was knocked out of the competition.

== Style of play ==
Usually deployed as an attacking midfielder, Jradi can also play on both wings, as a central midfielder, or as a false nine.

== Career statistics ==
=== Club ===
As of match played 3 October 2026

Club	Season	League			National cup (Note: Includes Danish Cup, Norwegian Football Cup, Croatian Football Cup, Cypriot Cup, Thai FA Cup)		Continental		Other		Total	
Club	Season	Division	Apps	Goals	Apps	Goals	Apps	Goals	Apps	Goals	Apps	Goals
B.93	2010–11	Danish 2nd Division		2	—		—		—			2
B.93	2011–12	Danish 2nd Division		6	—		—		—			6
B.93	Total		33	8	0	0	0	0	0	0	33	8
AB	2012–13	Danish 1st Division	28	8	—		—		—		28	8
Nordsjælland	2013–14	Danish Superliga	4	0	0	0	1 (Note: Appearance in UEFA Europa League qualifying round(s))	0	—		5	0
Strømsgodset II	2014	Norwegian Second Division	7	3	—		—		—		7	3
Strømsgodset II	2015	Norwegian Second Division	9	6	—		—		—		9	6
Strømsgodset II	Total		16	9	0	0	0	0	0	0	16	9
Strømsgodset	2014	Tippeligaen	8	0	—		—		—		8	0
Strømsgodset	2015	Tippeligaen	12	2	2	1	4	1	—		18	4
Strømsgodset	2016	Tippeligaen	—		—		—		—		0	0
Strømsgodset	2017	Eliteserien	29	10	2	2	—		—		31	12
Strømsgodset	2018	Eliteserien	16	2	2	2	—		—		18	4
Strømsgodset	Total		65	14	6	5	4	1	0	0	75	20
Lillestrøm (loan)	2016	Tippeligaen	26	4	3	1	—		—		29	5
Hajduk Split	2018–19	Croatian First League	25	2	3	1	0	0	—		28	3
Hajduk Split	2019–20	Croatian First League	33	3	1	0	2	1	—		36	4
Hajduk Split	2020–21	Croatian First League	15	0	1	0	1	0	—		17	0
Hajduk Split	Total		73	5	5	1	3	1	0	0	81	7
Apollon Limassol	2021–22	Cypriot First Division	22	3	2	0	2 (Note: Appearance in UEFA Europa Conference League qualifying round)	2	—		26	5
Apollon Limassol	2022–23	Cypriot First Division	19	3	1	0	5 (Note: One appearance in UEFA Europa League qualifying round; four appearances in UEFA Conference League)	0	0	0	25	3
Apollon Limassol	Total		41	6	3	0	7	2	0	0	51	8
Bangkok United	2023–24	Thai League 1	17	4	2	1	5 (Note: Appearances in AFC Champions League)	0	—		24	5
Bangkok United	2024–25	Thai League 1	21	5	2	0	6 (Note: One appearance in AFC Champions League Elite qualifying round; five appearances, three goals in AFC Champions League Two)	3	1 (Note: Appearance in Thai League Cup)	0	30	8
Bangkok United	Total		38	9	4	1	11	3	1	0	54	13
AEL Limassol	2025–26	Cypriot First Division	17	0	3	0	—		—		20	0
B.93	2026–27	Danish 2nd Division	9	1	1	0	—		—		10	1
Career total			350	64	25	8	26	7	1	0	402	79

=== International ===
As of match played 16 December 2024

Appearances and goals by national team and year
National team	Year	Apps	Goals
Lebanon	2015	1	1
Lebanon	2016	1	0
Lebanon	2017	0	0
Lebanon	2018	3	0
Lebanon	2019	3	0
Lebanon	2020	1	0
Lebanon	2021	7	0
Lebanon	2022	1	0
Lebanon	2023	3	1
Lebanon	2024	6	1
Total		26	3

Scores and results list Lebanon's goal tally first, score column indicates score after each Jradi goal.

List of international goals scored by Bassel Jradi
No.	Date	Venue	Opponent	Score	Result	Competition	Ref.
1	26 August 2015	Rafic Hariri Stadium, Beirut, Lebanon	Iraq	2–1	2–3	Friendly	
2	7 September 2023	700th Anniversary Stadium, Chiang Mai, Thailand	Thailand	1–1	1–2	2023 King's Cup	
3	22 January 2024	Jassim bin Hamad Stadium, Al Rayyan, Qatar	Tajikistan	1–0	1–2	2023 AFC Asian Cup	

== Honours ==
Apollon Limassol

- Cypriot First Division: 2021–22
- Cypriot Super Cup: 2022

Bangkok United

- Thai FA Cup: 2023–24
- Thailand Champions Cup: 2023

== See also ==
- List of Lebanon international footballers born outside Lebanon
- List of sportspeople who competed for more than one nation
