= Chutiphan Nobnorb =

Thai footballer (born 1994)

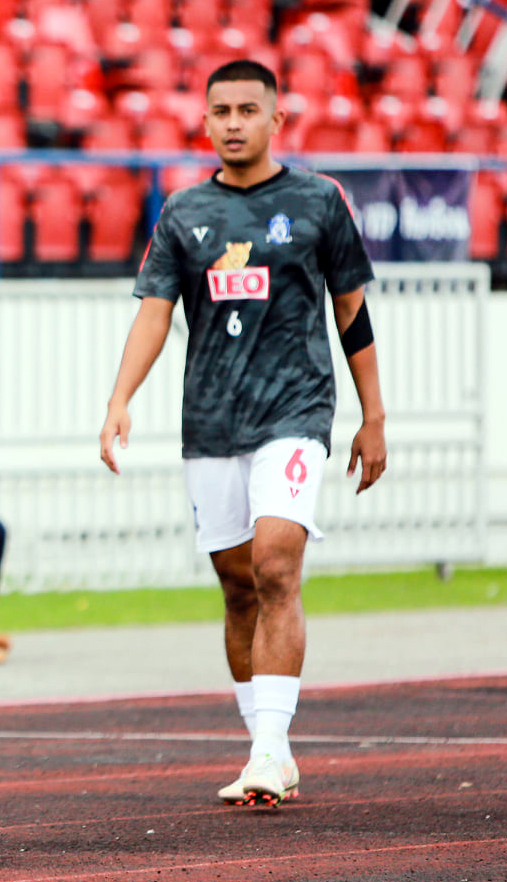

Personal information
- Full name: Chutiphan Nobnorb
- Date of birth: 9 August 1994 (age 32)
- Place of birth: Bangkok, Thailand
- Height: 1.87 m (6 ft 1 1/2 in)
- Position: Centre back

Team information
- Current team: Rajpracha
- Number: 6

Youth career
- 2010–2014: Muangthong United

Senior career*
Years	Team	Apps	(Gls)
2015–2017	Muangthong United	0	(0)
2015	→ Assumption United (loan)	15	(0)
2016	→ Samutsongkhram (loan)	8	(0)
2016	→ Pattaya United (loan)	2	(0)
2017	→ Trat (loan)	7	(0)
2017–2019	Army United	32	(2)
2020–2021	Chiangrai United	3	(0)
2021–2022	Chiangmai	21	(0)
2022–	Rajpracha	25	(0)
- * Club domestic league appearances and goals as of 30 April 2023

Chutiphan Nobnorb (Thai: ชุติพันธุ์ นบนอบ; born 9 August 1994) is a Thai professional footballer who plays as a centre back for Thai League 2 club Rajpracha.
