= Alef (footballer, born 1993) =

Brazilian footballer (born 1993)

Personal information
- Full name: Alef Vieira Santos
- Date of birth: 10 September 1993 (age 33)
- Place of birth: Itabuna, Brazil
- Height: 1.87 m (6 ft 2 in)
- Position: Centre-back

Team information
- Current team: Nakhon Ratchasima

Youth career
- Avaí

Senior career*
Years	Team	Apps	(Gls)
2012–2013	Avaí	20	(0)
2013–2015	Internacional	0	(0)
2014	→ Paraná (loan)	7	(0)
2015	→ Joinville (loan)	11	(1)
2017-2018	Guarani	2	(0)
2019	Operário	0	(0)
2019	Cuiabá	2	(0)
2019	Jaraguá	0	(0)
2020–2021	Suphanburi	29	(1)
2021–2023	Khon Kaen United	43	(0)
2023	Bhayangkara	9	(1)
2024	Chiangmai	14	(0)
2024–2025	Persiraja Banda Aceh	9	(0)
2026	Tuna Luso	0	(0)
2026–	Nakhon Ratchasima	0	(0)
- * Club domestic league appearances and goals as of 14 March 2026

Alef Vieira Santos (born 10 September 1993), is a Brazilian professional footballer who plays as centre-back for Nakhon Ratchasima.

== Early life ==
Alef was born in Itabuna.

== Career ==
Alef made his debut for Avai against Guarani on 9 November 2012.

Alef made his debut for Parana against Ponte Preta on 1 October 2014.

Alef made his debut for Joinville against Figueirense on 26 February 2015. He scored his first goal for the club also against Figueirense on 12 April 2015, scoring in the 1st minute.

Alef made his debut for Guarani on 19 March 2017 against Penapolense.

Alef made his debut for Cuiaba on 8 June 2019 against Londrina.

Alef made his debut for Suphanburi against Sukhothai on 15 February 2020. He scored his first goal for the club against Police Tero on 30 October 2020.

Alef made his debut for Khonkaen against Suphanburi on 30 October 2021.

Alef made his debut for Bhayangkara against Persikabo on 22 July 2023. He scored his first goal for the club against Persis Solo on 29 October 2023.
