= Robson (footballer, born 1991) =

Brazilian footballer (born 1991)

Personal information
- Full name: Robson dos Santos Fernandes
- Date of birth: 30 May 1991 (age 35)
- Place of birth: Campinas, Brazil
- Height: 1.79 m (5 ft 10 in)
- Position: Forward

Team information
- Current team: Novorizontino
- Number: 11

Youth career
- 2007–2010: Ponte Preta

Senior career*
Years	Team	Apps	(Gls)
2010	Ponte Preta	30	(13)
2010–2015	São Caetano	43	(13)
2012–2013	→ Ferroviária (loan)	34	(11)
2014	→ Rio Claro (loan)	13	(2)
2016–2017	Paraná	70	(19)
2016–2017	→ São Paulo (loan)	7	(0)
2018–2019	Bangkok United	31	(14)
2019–2021	Coritiba	66	(20)
2021–2022	Fortaleza	75	(19)
2023–2024	Coritiba	80	(27)
2025–	Novorizontino	79	(29)
- * Club domestic league appearances and goals as of 17 November 2026

Robson dos Santos Fernandes (born 30 May 1991), simply known as Robson, is a Brazilian footballer who plays as a forward for Novorizontino.

== Club career ==
=== Early career ===
Robson was born in Campinas, and played youth football for Ponte Preta. He made his senior debut for the club on 28 February 2010, starting in a 1–3 Campeonato Paulista away loss against Grêmio Barueri.

Robson subsequently moved to São Caetano, and had loan stints at Ferroviária and Rio Claro before establishing himself as a starter in 2014. In the following year, he was Azulão's top goalscorer in Série D with eight goals, but still left the club in December 2015.

=== Paraná ===
On 14 December 2015 Robson signed for Série B club Paraná, until the following November. After scoring eight league goals in 21 matches, he renewed until the end of 2017 with the club.

==== Loan to São Paulo ====
Robson was loaned to São Paulo on 9 September 2016. He made his Série A debut two days later, coming on as a late substitute for Kelvin in a 3–1 home win against Figueirense.

After just seven league matches, Robson was separated from the first team squad in the 2017 season, and had his loan terminated in March of that year. He immediately became a starter back at his parent club.

=== Bangkok United ===
After failing to agree new terms with Paraná, Robson moved abroad and joined Thai side Bangkok United on a two-year contract. He was the club's top scorer in the 2018 season, with 14 goals.

=== Coritiba ===
On 11 July 2019, Robson returned to his home country and joined Coritiba on a short-term deal. In November 2020, after establishing himself as a regular starter, he renewed his link until February 2021.

=== Fortaleza ===
On 26 February 2021, Robson was announced at Fortaleza on a two-year contract. In his first year, he scored a career-best 15 goals in 57 matches overall.

=== Coritiba return ===
On 7 January 2023, Robson returned to Coritiba on a permanent deal. He was the club's top scorer with 14 goals in his first season, but was unable to avoid team relegation.

On 21 November 2024, after another 14 goals during the year, Robson announced his departure from Coxa.

=== Novorizontino ===
On 22 January 2025, Novorizontino announced the signing of Robson for the season. He was the top scorer of the 2026 Campeonato Paulista with eight goals, as his side finished second.

== Career statistics ==
As of 26 March 2026

Appearances and goals by club, season and competition
Club	Season	League			State League		National Cup		Continental		Other		Total	
Club	Season	Division	Apps	Goals	Apps	Goals	Apps	Goals	Apps	Goals	Apps	Goals	Apps	Goals
Ponte Preta	2010	Série B	0	0	2	0	1	0	—		—		3	0
São Caetano	2010	Série B	1	0	—		—		—		—		1	0
São Caetano	2013	Série B	3	0	—		—		—		10 (Note: Appearance(s) in Copa Paulista)	3	13	3
São Caetano	2014	Série C	17	3	—		—		—		—		17	3
São Caetano	2015	Série D	10	6	12	4	—		—		—		22	10
São Caetano	Total		31	9	12	4	—		—		10	3	53	16
Ferroviária (loan)	2012	Paulista A2	—		21	10	—		—		10	1	31	11
Ferroviária (loan)	2013	Paulista A2	—		13	1	—		—		—		13	1
Ferroviária (loan)	Total		—		34	11	—		—		10	1	44	12
Rio Claro (loan)	2014	Paulista	—		13	2	—		—		—		13	2
Paraná	2016	Série B	21	8	14	4	4	0	—		—		39	12
Paraná	2017	Série B	33	7	2	0	5	0	—		1 (Note: Appearance(s) in Primeira Liga)	0	41	7
Paraná	Total		54	15	16	4	9	0	—		1	0	80	19
São Paulo (loan)	2016	Série A	7	0	—		—		—		—		7	0
Bangkok United	2018	Thai League 1	31	14	—		1	0	—		1 (Note: Appearance(s) in Thai League Cup)	0	33	14
Bangkok United	2019	Thai League 1	0	0	—		2	2	—		1	0	3	2
Bangkok United	Total		31	14	—		3	2	—		2	0	36	16
Coritiba	2019	Série B	21	8	—		—		—		—		21	8
Coritiba	2020	Série A	32	8	13	4	1	0	—		—		46	12
Coritiba	Total		53	16	13	4	1	0	—		—		67	20
Fortaleza	2021	Série A	34	10	7	4	8	0	—		8 (Note: Appearance(s) in Copa do Nordeste)	1	57	15
Fortaleza	2022	Série A	29	4	5	1	4	0	3 (Note: Appearance(s) in Copa Libertadores)	0	7	1	48	6
Fortaleza	Total		63	14	12	5	12	0	3	0	15	2	105	21
Coritiba	2023	Série A	32	12	12	1	3	1	—		—		47	14
Coritiba	2024	Série B	22	3	14	11	1	0	—		—		37	14
Coritiba	Total		54	15	26	12	4	1	—		—		84	28
Novorizontino	2025	Série B	24	3	9	2	2	1	—		—		35	6
Novorizontino	2026	Série B	1	0	11	7	3	1	—		—		15	8
Novorizontino	Total		25	3	20	9	5	2	—		—		50	14
Career total			318	86	148	51	35	5	3	0	38	6	542	148

== Honours ==
Fortaleza

- Campeonato Cearense: 2021, 2022
- Copa do Nordeste: 2022

Novorizontino

- Campeonato Brasileiro Série B: 2026

Individual

- Campeonato Paulista top scorer: 2026
- Campeonato Paulista Team of the Year: 2026
