= Theppitak Poonjuang =

Thai footballer (born 1998)

Personal information
- Full name: Theppitak Poonjuang
- Date of birth: 30 June 1998 (age 28)
- Place of birth: Rayong, Thailand
- Height: 1.67 m (5 ft 5 1/2 in)
- Position: Right wing

Team information
- Current team: Rayong
- Number: 31

Youth career
- 2011–2014: Pathumkongka School
- 2015: Rayong

Senior career*
Years	Team	Apps	(Gls)
2016–2025	Rayong	136	(17)
2026–	Trat	2	(2)
- * Club domestic league appearances and goals as of 13 July 2025

Theppitak Poonjuang (Thai: เทพพิทักษ์ พูลจวง; born July 30, 1998) is a Thai professional footballer who plays as a midfielder for Thai League 2 club Rayong.
