= Jung Dong-yoon =

South Korean politician (1937–2025)

- 정동윤

Member of the National Assembly of South Korea
- In office 13 May 1985 – 29 May 1992

Personal details
- Born: 7 December 1937 Yeongcheon, Korea, Japan
- Died: 23 October 2025 (aged 87)
- Political party: DJP
- Education: Korea University Law School; Dongguk University
- Occupation: Businessman

Jung Dong-yoon (Korean: 정동윤; 7 December 1937 – 23 October 2025) was a South Korean politician. A member of the Democratic Justice Party, he served in the National Assembly from 1985 to 1992.

Jung died on 23 October 2025, at the age of 87.
