= Guntapon Keereeleang =

Thai footballer

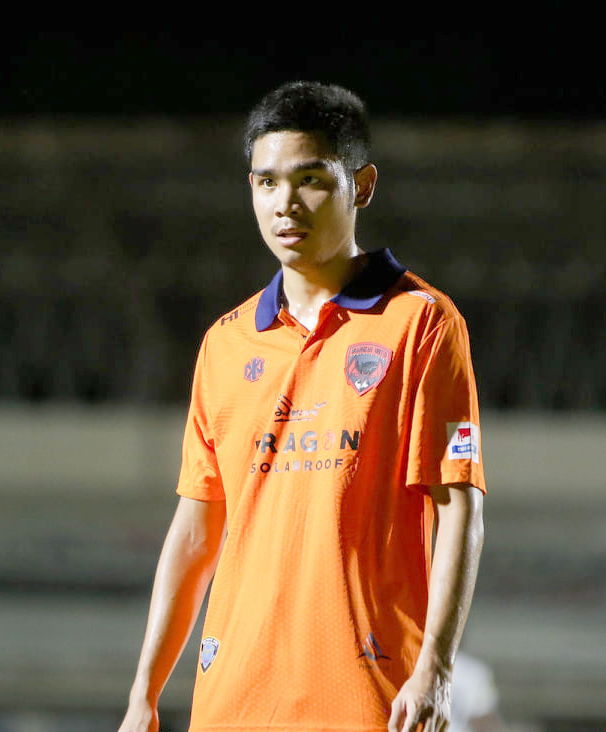
- Guntapon Keereeleang playing for Muangkan United.

Personal information
- Full name: Guntapon Keereeleang
- Date of birth: 22 January 2001 (age 25)
- Place of birth: Bangkok, Thailand
- Height: 1.84 m (6 ft 1/2 in)
- Position: Striker

Team information
- Current team: Bangkok United
- Number: 20

Youth career
- 2016–2018: Bangkok Christian College

Senior career*
Years	Team	Apps	(Gls)
2019–	Bangkok United	16	(2)
2022	→ Muangkan United (loan)	13	(1)
2022–2023	→ Samut Prakan (loan)	8	(4)
2023–2024	→ Ayutthaya United (loan)	18	(5)
2025	→ Rayong (loan)	11	(1)

International career^{‡}
2024	Thailand U23	5	(0)
- * Club domestic league appearances and goals as of 9 January 2026 ‡ National team caps and goals as of 22 April 2024

Guntapon Keereeleang (Thai: กัณตภณ คีรีแลง; born 22 January 2001) is a Thai professional footballer who plays as a striker for Thai League 1 club Bangkok United.

== International career ==
In 2024, he was called up by Thailand U23 for 2024 AFC U-23 Asian Cup in Qatar.

== Honours ==
=== Club ===
Bangkok United

- Thai FA Cup: 2023–24
