= Jirayu Niamthaisong =

Thai footballer (born 1996)

Personal information
- Full name: Jirayu Niamthaisong
- Date of birth: 29 September 1996 (age 30)
- Place of birth: Maha Sarakham, Thailand
- Height: 1.80 m (5 ft 11 in)
- Position: Midfielder

Team information
- Current team: Sisaket United
- Number: 2

Senior career*
Years	Team	Apps	(Gls)
2017–2024	Bangkok United	5	(0)
2022–2023	→ Samut Prakan (loan)	25	(2)
2023–2024	→ Ayutthaya United (loan)	24	(0)
2024–2025	Sisaket United	21	(0)
2025	Khon Kaen United	0	(0)
2026–	Roiet PB	0	(0)
- * Club domestic league appearances and goals as of 10 March 2025

Jirayu Niamthaisong (Thai: จิรายุ เนียมไธสง, born 29 September 1996), is a Thai professional footballer who plays as a midfielder.
