= Chayathorn Tapsuvanavon =

Thai footballer (born 2000)

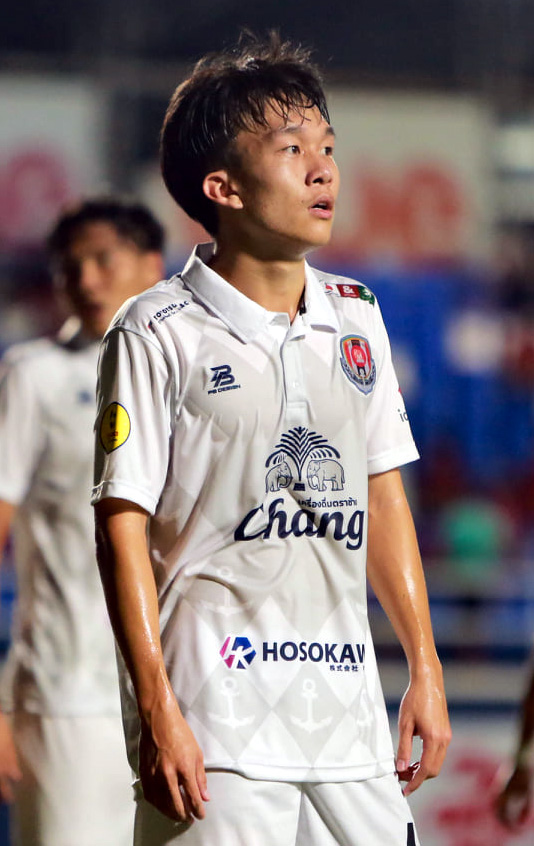
- Navy FC, 2022

Personal information
- Full name: Chayathorn Tapsuvanavon
- Date of birth: 12 March 2000 (age 26)
- Place of birth: Bangkok, Thailand
- Height: 1.72 m (5 ft 7 1/2 in)
- Position: Defensive midfielder

Team information
- Current team: Chonburi
- Number: 80

Youth career
- 2015–2019: Bangkok United

Senior career*
Years	Team	Apps	(Gls)
2019–2024	Bangkok United	14	(0)
2020	→ FC Tokyo U-23 (loan)	0	(0)
2022	→ Navy (loan)	15	(0)
2024	→ Ayutthaya United (loan)	34	(1)
2025–	Chonburi	16	(0)

International career^{‡}
2015–2016	Thailand U16		
2021–2024	Thailand U23	1	(0)
- * Club domestic league appearances and goals as of 26 April 2025 ‡ National team caps and goals as of 9 June 2022 (UTC)

Chayathorn Tapsuvanavon (Thai: ชยธร เทพสุวรรณวร, born 12 March 2000) is a Thai professional footballer who plays as a defensive midfielder for Thai League 2 club Chonburi.

== Honours ==
=== Club ===
Bangkok United

- Thai League 1 runners-up: 2022–23
- Thai FA Cup runners-up: 2022–23

Chonburi

- Thai League 2 : 2024–25
