= Sanrawat Dechmitr =

Thai footballer

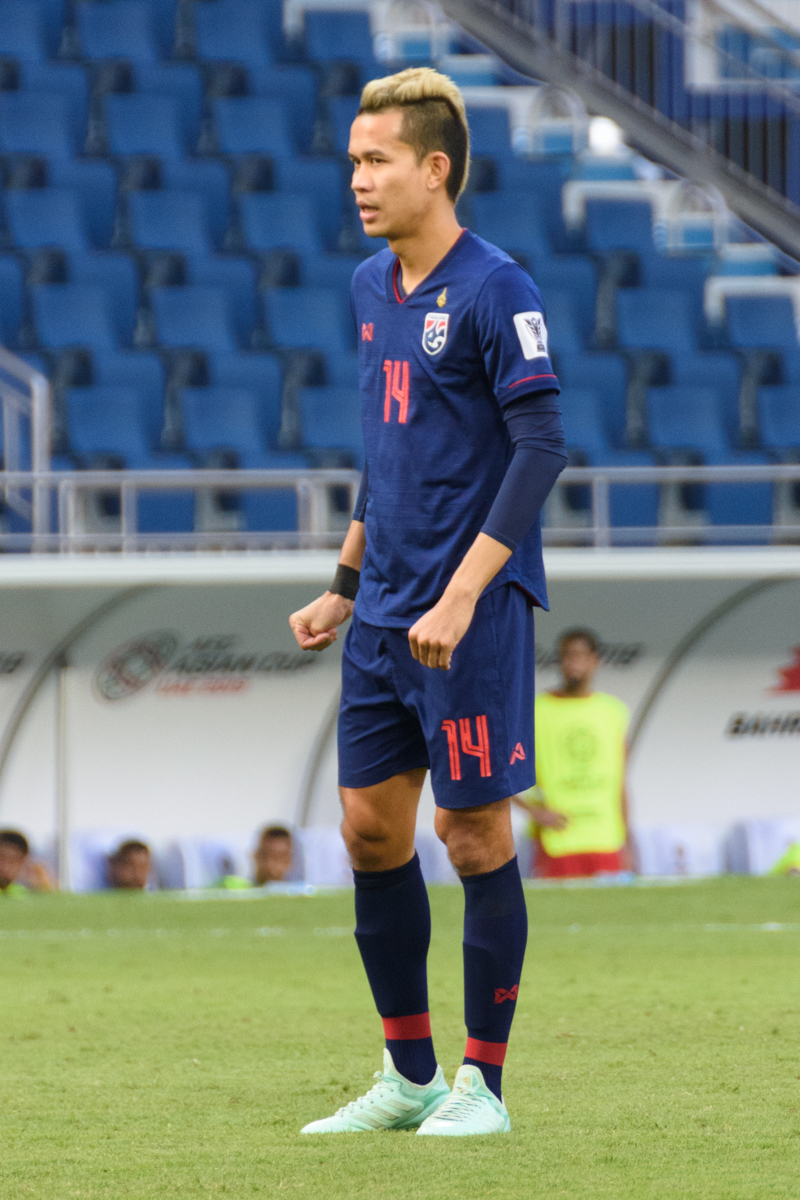
- Dechmitr playing for Thailand at the 2019 AFC Asian Cup

Personal information
- Full name: Sanrawat Dechmitr
- Date of birth: 3 August 1989 (age 37)
- Place of birth: Samut Prakan, Thailand
- Height: 1.81 m (5 ft 11 in)
- Position: Midfielder

Team information
- Current team: Ayutthaya United
- Number: 29

Youth career
- 2005–2007: Bangkok Sports School
- 2008: Kasem Bundit University

Senior career*
Years	Team	Apps	(Gls)
2008–2009	Tampines Rovers	7	(0)
2009–2010	Bangkok Glass	34	(5)
2011–2013	BEC Tero Sasana	15	(5)
2013–2022	Bangkok United	175	(19)
2021–2022	→ Ratchaburi Mitr Phol (loan)	25	(1)
2022	→ Kedah Darul Aman (loan)	13	(1)
2025–	Ayutthaya United	3	(0)

International career^{‡}
2010	Thailand U23	3	(0)
2013–2023	Thailand	31	(0)
Medal record
Thailand
Asean Football Championship
Winner	AFF Mitsubishi Electric Cup 2022	2022
- * Club domestic league appearances and goals as of 15 February 2026 (UTC) ‡ National team caps and goals as of 12:03, 7 January 2023 (UTC)

Sanrawat Dechmitr (Thai: สรรวัชญ์ เดชมิตร), formerly Wichaya Dechmitr (Thai: วิชะยา เดชมิตร), simply known as Camp (Thai: แคมป์) is a Thai professional footballer who plays as a midfielder for Thai League 1 club Ayutthaya United.

== International career ==
Sanrawat played for Thailand U23 in the 2010 Asian Games. In May 2015, he played for Thailand in the 2018 FIFA World Cup qualification (AFC) against Vietnam. In 2018 he was called up to the 2018 AFF Suzuki Cup.

== Style of play ==
Sanrawat has a formidable passing ability. He was later moved to a deep-lying playmaker role by Alexandré Pölking. This position best utilised his attributes and allowed him to operate creatively from a deeper position, in or even behind the main midfield line, in a seemingly defensive midfield role, where he was allowed more time on the ball to create scoring opportunities with his trademark long balls. He also had great coordination abilities, which was shown in the AFF Championship where he provided many assists for Thailand.

== Honours ==
Thailand

- King's Cup: 2016, 2017
- AFF Championship: 2022

Individual

- Thai League 1 Player of the Month: August 2015
- 2018 AFF Championship: Best Eleven
- ASEAN Football Federation Best XI: 2019
