= Anon Amornlerdsak =

Thai footballer (born 1997)

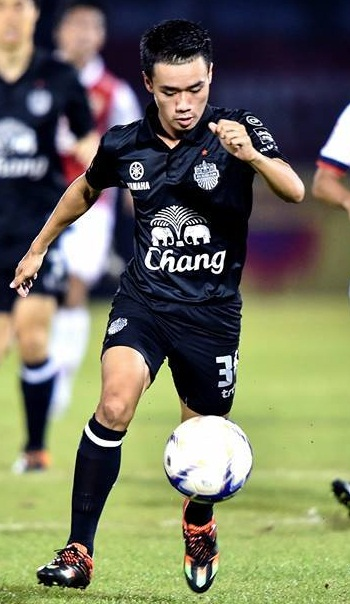
- Anon playing for Buriram United in 2017

Personal information
- Full name: Anon Amornlerdsak
- Date of birth: 6 November 1997 (age 29)
- Place of birth: Mae Rim, Chiang Mai, Thailand
- Height: 1.70 m (5 ft 7 in)
- Positions: Winger; attacking midfielder

Team information
- Current team: Rayong (on loan from Bangkok United)
- Number: 27

Youth career
- 2009–2011: Christ FC
- 2012–2013: Buriram United

Senior career*
Years	Team	Apps	(Gls)
2014–2018	Buriram United	55	(8)
2014–2015	→ Surin City (loan)	23	(4)
2018	→ Bangkok Glass (loan)	15	(3)
2019–	Bangkok United	72	(10)
2022–2023	→ Ratchaburi (loan)	12	(2)
2025	→ Port (loan)	7	(0)
2025–	→ Rayong (loan)	20	(5)

International career^{‡}
2015–2016	Thailand U19	10	(6)
2017–2020	Thailand U23	15	(6)
2018	Thailand	2	(0)
Medal record
Thailand under-19
AFF U-19 Youth Championship
Winner	AFF U-19 2015	Football
- * Club domestic league appearances and goals as of 01:27, 18 June 2026 (UTC) ‡ National team caps and goals as of 18 January 2020

Anon Amornlerdsak (Thai: อานนท์ อมรเลิศศักดิ์, born November 6, 1997) is a Thai professional footballer who plays for Thai League 1 club Rayong, on loan from Bangkok United, and the Thailand national team.

== Personal life ==
Anon is one of the rare Christians in the Thai national team. Anon grew up in the Lisu tribe in Mae Rim District, Chiangmai.

== International career ==
In 2020, He played the 2020 AFC U-23 Championship with Thailand U23.

== International goals ==
=== U23 ===
Anon Amornlerdsak– goals for Thailand U23
No	Date	Venue	Opponent	Score	Result	Competition
1.	24 March 2019	Mỹ Đình National Stadium, Hanoi, Vietnam	Brunei	4–0	8–0	2020 AFC U-23 Championship qualification
2.	4 November 2019	Chulalongkorn University Stadium, Bangkok, Thailand	Myanmar	1–0	3–2	Friendly
3.	4 November 2019	Chulalongkorn University Stadium, Bangkok, Thailand	Myanmar	3–1	3–2	Friendly
4.	28 November 2019	Rizal Memorial Stadium, Manila, Philippines	Brunei	0–3	0–7	2019 SEA Games
5.	28 November 2019	Rizal Memorial Stadium, Manila, Philippines	Brunei	0–6	0–7	2019 SEA Games
6.	11 January 2020	Rajamangala National Stadium, Bangkok, Thailand	Australia	0–1	2–1	2020 AFC U-23 Championship

=== U19 ===
#	Date	Venue	Opponent	Score	Result	Competition
1.	4 September 2015	Vientiane, Laos	Vietnam	5–0	6–0	2015 AFF U-19 Youth Championship Final
2.	4 September 2015	Vientiane, Laos	Vietnam	6–0	6–0	2015 AFF U-19 Youth Championship Final
3.	30 September 2015	Nonthaburi, Thailand	Chinese Taipei	1–0	3–0	2016 AFC U-19 Championship qualification
4.	2 October 2015	Nonthaburi, Thailand	Northern Mariana Islands	3–0	7–0	2016 AFC U-19 Championship qualification
5.	2 October 2015	Nonthaburi, Thailand	Northern Mariana Islands	6–0	7–0	2016 AFC U-19 Championship qualification
6.	13 October 2016	Riffa, Bahrain	South Korea	1–2	1–3	2016 AFC U-19 Championship

== Honours ==
=== Club ===
Buriram United

- Thai League 1 (2): 2015, 2017
- Thai FA Cup (1): 2015
- Toyota Premier Cup (1): 2016
- Mekong Club Championship (2): 2015, 2016

Bangkok United

- Thailand Champions Cup: 2023
- Thai FA Cup: 2023–24

==== Port ====
- Piala Presiden: 2025

=== International ===
Thailand U-19

- AFF U-19 Youth Championship (1): 2015
