= Jedsadakorn Kowngam =

Thai footballer (born 1997)

Personal information
- Full name: Jedsadakorn Kowngam
- Date of birth: 13 March 1997 (age 29)
- Place of birth: Buriram, Thailand
- Height: 1.80 m (5 ft 11 in)
- Position: Left back

Youth career
- 2015–2016: Bangkok United

Senior career*
| Years | Team | Apps | (Gls) |
| 2017–2024 | Bangkok United | 19 | (0) |
| 2018 | → Ubon UMT United (loan) | 10 | (1) |
| 2019 | → Army United (loan) | 5 | (0) |
| 2020–2021 | → Nongbua Pitchaya (loan) | 28 | (1) |
| 2022–2023 | → Lamphun Warrior (loan) | 13 | (0) |
| 2023–2024 | → Nakhon Si United (loan) | 18 | (0) |

International career^{‡}
| 2019 | Thailand U23 | 5 | (1) |
- * Club domestic league appearances and goals as of 5 November 2023 ‡ National team caps and goals as of 26 February 2019

Jedsadakorn Kowngam (Thai: เจษฎากร ขาวงาม, born 13 March 1997) is a Thai professional footballer who plays as a left back.

== International Goals ==
=== U23 ===
Jedsadakorn Kowngam– goals for Thailand U23
| No | Date | Venue | Opponent | Score | Result | Competition |
|---|---|---|---|---|---|---|
| 1. | 19 February 2019 | Olympic Stadium, Phnom Penh, Cambodia | Philippines | 0–2 | 0–3 | 2019 AFF U-22 Youth Championship |

== Honours ==
=== International ===
Thailand U-23

- 2019 AFF U-22 Youth Championship: Runner up

=== Club ===
Nongbua Pitchaya

- Thai League 2 Champions : 2020–21
