= Vander (footballer, born 1990) =

Brazilian footballer

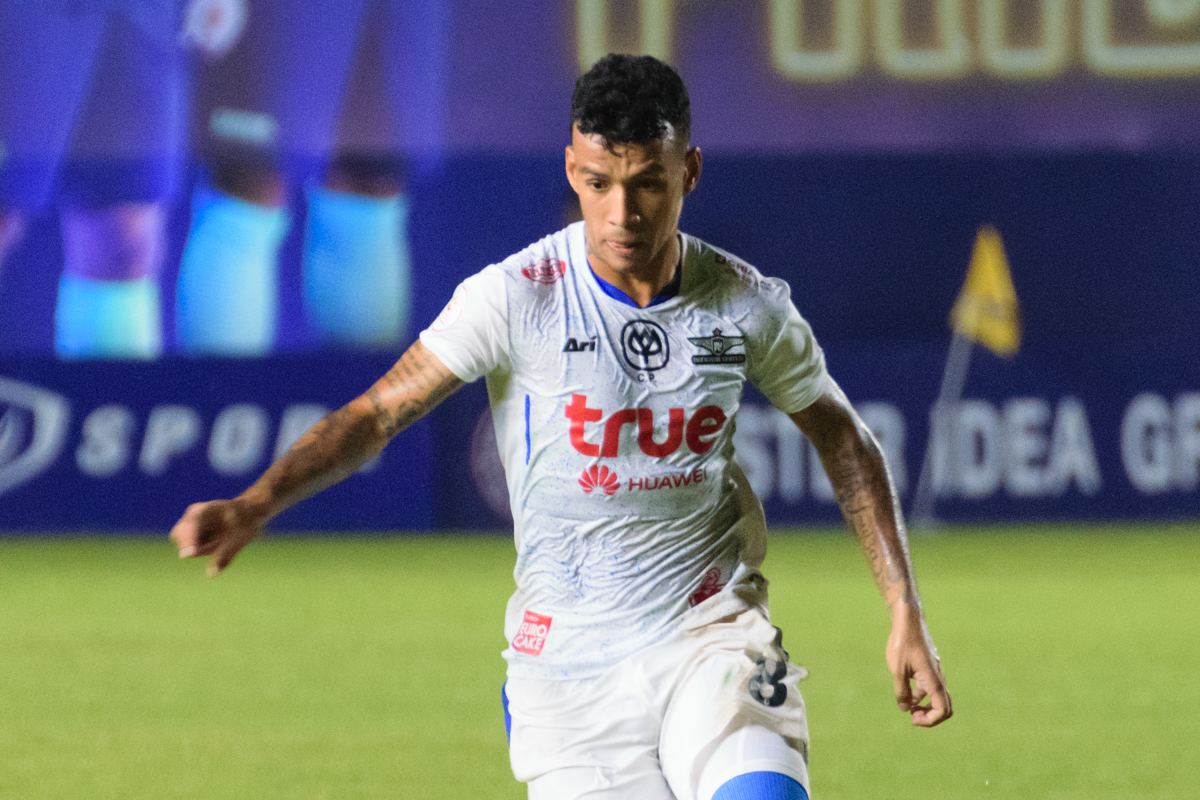
- Vander playing for Bangkok United in 2018

Personal information
- Full name: Vander Luis Silva Souza
- Date of birth: 17 April 1990 (age 36)
- Place of birth: Salvador, Brazil
- Height: 1.76 m (5 ft 9 1/2 in)
- Positions: Winger; attacking midfielder

Youth career
- 2008–2009: Bahia

Senior career*
Years	Team	Apps	(Gls)
2010–2012	Bahia	33	(4)
2011	→ Flamengo (loan)	2	(0)
2013–2016	Vitória	55	(5)
2014	→ Portuguesa (loan)	3	(0)
2017	Chiangrai United	29	(5)
2018–2024	Bangkok United	144	(33)
2024	PT Prachuap	11	(1)
2025	Chonburi	12	(4)
- * Club domestic league appearances and goals as of 26 April 2025

Vander Luis Silva Souza (born 17 April 1990 in Salvador), simply known as Vander, is a Brazilian footballer who plays as a winger or attacking midfielder.

== Career ==
=== Career statistics ===
Correct as of 25 June 2012

Club	Season	Campeonato Brasileiro Série A		Copa do Brasil		Copa Libertadores		Copa Sudamericana		State League		Total	
Club	Season	Apps	Goals	Apps	Goals	Apps	Goals	Apps	Goals	Apps	Goals	Apps	Goals
Bahia	2010	26	3	—		—		—		1	0	27	3
Bahia	Total	26	3	—		—		—		1	0	27	3
Flamengo (loan)	2011	2	0	—		—		1	0	5	1	8	1
Flamengo (loan)	Total	2	0	—		—		1	0	5	1	8	1
Bahia	2012	7	1	3	1	—		1	0	15	0	26	2
Bahia	Total	7	1	3	1	—		1	0	15	0	26	2
Vitória	2013	16	1	4	1	—		1	0	8	2	30 (Note: One match played for 2013 Copa do Nordeste)	4
Vitória	Total	16	1	4	1	—		1	0	8	2	30	4
Portuguesa (loan)	2014	0	0	0	0	—		0	0	0	0	0	0
Portuguesa (loan)	Total	0	0	0	0	—		0	0	0	0	0	0
Career total		51	5	7	2	0	0	3	0	29	3	91	10

according to combined sources on the Flamengo official website and Flaestatística.

== Honours ==
Flamengo

- Taça Guanabara: 2011
- Taça Rio: 2011
- Campeonato Carioca: 2011

Bahia

- Campeonato Baiano: 2012

Vitória

- Campeonato Baiano: 2013, 2016

Chiangrai United

- Thai FA Cup: 2017

Bangkok United

- Thai League 1 runner-up: 2018, 2022–23
- Thai FA Cup runner-up: 2022–23
- Thai FA Cup: 2023–24

Chonburi

- Thai League 2: 2024–25
