= Putthinan Wannasri =

Thai footballer (born 1992)

Personal information
- Full name: Putthinan Wannasri
- Date of birth: 5 September 1992 (age 34)
- Place of birth: Phitsanulok, Thailand
- Height: 1.72 m (5 ft 7 1/2 in)
- Position: Defender

Team information
- Current team: Chanthaburi
- Number: 5

Youth career
- 2005–2010: Assumption College Sriracha

Senior career*
Years	Team	Apps	(Gls)
2011–2013	Chonburi	6	(0)
2013–2014	→ Army United (loan)	22	(0)
2014–2015	Suphanburi	13	(1)
2015–2025	Bangkok United	193	(7)
2025	→ Rayong (loan)	10	(1)
2025–	Chanthaburi	26	(0)

International career
2010	Thailand U19	2	(0)
2013–2015	Thailand U23	5	(1)
2013–2015	Thailand	5	(0)
- * Club domestic league appearances and goals as of 12 January 2013

Putthinan Wannasri (Thai: พุทธินันท์ วรรณศรี, born September 5, 1992), simply known as Aon (Thai: อ้น), is a Thai professional footballer who plays as a defender for Thai League 2 club Chanthaburi and the Thailand national team.

== International career ==
Putthinan debuted for Thailand against China, in a friendly match which Thailand won 5-1. In May 2015, he was called up to Thailand to play in the 2018 FIFA World Cup qualification (AFC) against Vietnam.

== Honours ==
=== Club ===
Bangkok United

- Thailand Champions Cup: 2023
- Thai FA Cup: 2023–24

=== International ===
Thailand

- King's Cup (1): 2017
