= Wisarut Imura =

Thai footballer (born 1997)

Personal information
- Full name: Wisarut Imura
- Date of birth: 18 October 1997 (age 29)
- Place of birth: Bangkok, Thailand
- Height: 1.80 m (5 ft 11 in)
- Position: Defensive midfielder

Team information
- Current team: Bangkok United
- Number: 8

Youth career
- 2012–2015: Surasakmontree School
- 2016–2017: Bangkok United

Senior career*
Years	Team	Apps	(Gls)
2017–	Bangkok United	113	(5)
2018	→ Air Force Central (loan)	15	(0)

International career^{‡}
2015–2016	Thailand U19	9	(3)
2017–2018	Thailand U21	9	(0)
2019–2020	Thailand U23	9	(0)
2022	Thailand	2	(0)
- * Club domestic league appearances and goals as of 9 January 2026 ‡ National team caps and goals as of 24 March 2022

Wisarut Imura (Thai: วิศรุต อิ่มอุระ, born October 18, 1997), simply known as Tia (Thai: เตี้ย), is a Thai footballer who plays as a defensive midfielder for a Thai League 1 club Bangkok United.

== International career ==
Wisarut has represented various Thailand youth national squads, including appearances at the 2015 AFF U-19 Youth Championship in Laos, the 2016 AFC U-19 Championship in Bahrain, and the 2020 AFC U-23 Championship qualification.

In 2022, he was called up by Thailand national team for friendly match against Nepal and Suriname.

== International goals ==
=== U19 ===
Wisarut Imura – goals for Thailand U19
No	Date	Venue	Opponent	Score	Result	Competition
1.	28 August 2015	Vientiane, Laos	Brunei	4–0	6–0	2015 AFF U-19 Youth Championship
2.	28 August 2015	Vientiane, Laos	Brunei	6–0	6–0	2015 AFF U-19 Youth Championship
3.	2 October 2015	Nonthaburi, Thailand	Northern Mariana Islands	5–0	7–0	2016 AFC U-19 Championship qualification

== Honours ==
=== Club ===
Bangkok United

- Thailand Champions Cup: 2023
- Thai FA Cup: 2023–24

=== International ===
Thailand U19

- AFF U-19 Youth Championship (1): 2015
