= Nattawut Suksum =

Thai footballer

Personal information
- Full name: Nattawut Suksum
- Date of birth: 6 November 1997 (age 29)
- Place of birth: Tak, Thailand
- Height: 1.76 m (5 ft 9 1/2 in)
- Positions: Forward; winger

Team information
- Current team: Nongbua Pitchaya

Senior career*
Years	Team	Apps	(Gls)
2017–2024	Bangkok United	51	(13)
2019	→ FC Tokyo U-23 (loan)	17	(3)
2022–2023	→ PT Prachuap (loan)	20	(1)
2023–2024	→ Ayutthaya United (loan)	34	(7)
2024–2026	BG Pathum United	3	(0)
2025–2026	→ Chanthaburi (loan)	30	(6)
2026–	Nongbua Pitchaya	0	(0)

International career
2017–2018	Thailand U21	7	(2)
2018–2019	Thailand U23	5	(1)
- * Club domestic league appearances and goals as of 3 April 2026

Nattawut Suksum (Thai: ณัฐวุฒิ สุขสุ่ม; born 6 November 1997) is a Thai professional footballer who plays as a forward or a winger for Thai League 2 club Nongbua Pitchaya.
