= 2019 Bangkok United F.C. season =

Bangkok United F.C.
2019 season
- Chairman: Kajorn Chearavanont
- Manager: Alexandré Pölking
- Stadium: Thammasat Stadium, Khlong Luang, Pathum Thani, Thailand
- Thai League T1: 4th
- Thai FA Cup: Semi-finals
- Thai League Cup: Quarter-finals
- AFC Champions League: Preliminary round 2
- Top goalscorer: League: Nelson Bonilla (16); All: Nelson Bonilla (17)
- Highest home attendance: 15,155 (vs. Buriram United – 17 March 2019)
- Lowest home attendance: 1,278 (vs. Chiangmai – 2 October 2019)
- Average home league attendance: 4,298
| Home colours | Away colours | Third colours |

The 2019 season is Bangkok United Football Club's 11th in the new era since they took over from Bangkok University Football Club in 2009. It is the 4th season in the Thai League and the club's 9th (7th consecutive) season in the top flight of the Thai football league system since returning in the 2013 season.

== Squad ==
As of 6 April 2019.

| Squad No. | Name | Nationality | Date of birth (age) | Previous club |
Goalkeepers
| 1 | Michael Falkesgaard | (Philippines) (Denmark) | 9 April 1991 (age 35) | (Denmark) FC Midtjylland |
| 34 | Warut Mekmusik | (Thailand) | 21 February 1992 (age 34) | (Thailand) Air Force Central F.C. |
| 98 | Sumethee Khokpho | (Thailand) (Germany) | 5 November 1998 (age 27) | (Germany) Fortuna Düsseldorf |
Defenders
| 2 | Ekkachai Sumrei | (Thailand) | 28 November 1988 (age 37) | (Thailand) Buriram United F.C. |
| 3 | Everton | (Brazil) | 5 February 1990 (age 36) | (Thailand) Chiangrai United F.C. |
| 4 | Manuel Bihr | (Thailand) (Germany) | 17 September 1993 (age 32) | (Germany) Stuttgarter Kickers |
| 5 | Putthinan Wannasri | (Thailand) | 5 September 1992 (age 34) | (Thailand) Suphanburi F.C. |
| 7 | Tristan Do | (Thailand) (France) | 31 January 1993 (age 33) | (Thailand) Muangthong United F.C. |
| 16 | Mika Chunuonsee | (Thailand) (Wales) | 26 March 1989 (age 37) | (Thailand) Suphanburi F.C. |
| 18 | Alexander Sieghart | (Thailand) (Germany) | 29 July 1994 (age 32) | (Thailand) Buriram United F.C. |
| 24 | Wanchai Jarunongkran | (Thailand) | 18 December 1996 (age 29) | (Thailand) Air Force Central F.C. |
| 31 | Peerapat Notchaiya | (Thailand) | 4 February 1993 (age 33) | (Thailand) Muangthong United F.C. |
| 38 | Worawut Sathaporn | (Thailand) | 25 October 1997 (age 28) | (Thailand) Youth Team |
| 41 | Athatcha Rahongthong | (Thailand) | 11 March 1997 (age 29) | (Thailand) Chonburi F.C. |
| 45 | Santipap Yaemsaen | (Thailand) | 1 March 2000 (age 26) | (Thailand) Youth Team |
| 51 | Kritsada Nontharat | (Thailand) | 1 February 2001 (age 25) | (Thailand) Youth Team |
Midfielders
| 6 | Anthony Ampaipitakwong | (Thailand) (United States) | 14 June 1988 (age 38) | (Thailand) Buriram United F.C. |
| 8 | Vander Luiz | (Brazil) | 17 April 1990 (age 36) | (Thailand) Chiangrai United F.C. |
| 10 | Pokklaw Anan | (Thailand) | 4 March 1991 (age 35) | (Thailand) Chonburi F.C. |
| 17 | Rungrath Poomchantuek | (Thailand) | 17 May 1992 (age 34) | (Thailand) Ratchaburi Mitr Phol F.C. |
| 27 | Anon Amornlerdsak | (Thailand) | 6 November 1997 (age 28) | (Thailand) Bangkok Glass F.C. |
| 28 | Thossawat Limwannasathian | (Thailand) | 17 May 1993 (age 33) | (Thailand) Muangthong United F.C. |
| 29 | Sanrawat Dechmitr | (Thailand) | 3 August 1989 (age 37) | (Thailand) BEC Tero Sasana |
| 37 | Wisarut Imura | (Thailand) | 18 October 1997 (age 28) | (Thailand) Air Force Central F.C. |
Strikers
| 11 | Nelson Bonilla | (El Salvador) | 11 September 1990 (age 36) | (Thailand) Sukhothai F.C. |
| 20 | Chananan Pombuppha | (Thailand) | 17 March 1992 (age 34) | (Thailand) Suphanburi F.C. |
| 22 | Jaycee John Okwunwanne | (Bahrain) | 8 October 1985 (age 40) | (Malaysia) FELDA United F.C. |
Players who left / loan out during season
| 9 | Mike Havenaar | (Japan) (Netherlands) | 20 May 1987 (age 39) | (Japan) Vissel Kobe |
| 14 | Teeratep Winothai | (Thailand) | 16 February 1985 (age 41) | (Thailand) BEC Tero Sasana |
| 15 | Jakkapan Pornsai | (Thailand) | 28 March 1987 (age 39) | (Thailand) Ratchaburi Mitr Phol F.C. |
| 22 | Kittipong Phuthawchueak | (Thailand) | 26 September 1989 (age 36) | (Thailand) Ratchaburi Mitr Phol F.C. |
| 30 | Robson | (Brazil) | 30 May 1991 (age 35) | (Brazil) Paraná Clube |

== League by seasons ==
| Season | League | Position | Notes |
|---|---|---|---|
| 2009 | Thai Premier League | 13th | Began of the new era by competed as Bangkok United F.C. |
| 2010 | Thai Premier League | 15th | Relegated to Thai Division 1 League |
| 2011 | Thai Division 1 League | 6th | |
| 2012 | Thai Division 1 League | 3rd | Promoted to Thai Premier League |
| 2013 | Thai Premier League | 13th | |
| 2014 | Thai Premier League | 8th | |
| 2015 | Thai Premier League | 5th | |
| 2016 | Thai League | 2nd | Thai Premier League renamed to Thai League |
| 2017 | Thai League | 3rd | |
| 2018 | Thai League | 2nd | |

== Transfer ==
=== Pre-season transfer ===
==== In ====
| Position | Player | Transferred from | Ref |
|---|---|---|---|
| DF | (Thailand) (France) Tristan Do | (Thailand) Muangthong United | |
| DF | (Thailand) Peerapat Notchaiya | (Thailand) Muangthong United | |
| MF | (Thailand) Anon Amornlerdsak | (Thailand) Buriram United | |
| FW | (El Salvador) Nelson Bonilla | (Thailand) Sukhothai | |
| FW | (Japan) (Netherlands) Mike Havenaar | (Japan) Vissel Kobe | |

==== Out ====
| Position | Player | Transferred To | Ref |
|---|---|---|---|
| GK | (Thailand) Varuth Wongsomsak | (Thailand) Air Force Central F.C. | Season loan |
| DF | (Thailand) Worawut Sathaporn | (Thailand) Air Force Central F.C. | Season loan |
| DF | (Thailand) Athatcha Rahongthong | (Thailand) Thai Honda F.C. | Season loan |
| DF | (Thailand) Nakin Wisetchat | (Thailand) Army United F.C. | Season loan |
| DF | (Thailand) Sathaporn Daengsee | (Thailand) Trat F.C. | Season loan |
| DF | (Thailand) (Spain) Ernesto Amantegui Phumipha | (Thailand) Port F.C. | THB 40m |
| MF | (Thailand) Sumanya Purisai | (Thailand) Port F.C. | THB 40m |
| MF | (Thailand) Sansern Limwattana | (Thailand) Port F.C. | THB 40m |
| MF | (Iran) Mehrdad Pooladi | | |
| MF | (Thailand) Pongsakon Seerot | (Thailand) JL Chiangmai United F.C. | |
| MF | (Thailand) Jakkit Wachpirom | (Thailand) Samut Prakan City F.C. | Season loan |
| MF | (Thailand) Nattawut Suksum | (Japan) FC Tokyo U-23 | Season loan |
| MF | (Thailand) Jedsadakorn Kowngam | (Thailand) Army United F.C. | Season loan |
| MF | (Thailand) (Sweden) Oscar Kahl | (Thailand) Air Force Central F.C. | Season loan |
| MF | (Thailand) Phattharaphol Khamsuk | (Thailand) Air Force Central F.C. | Season loan |
| FW | (Thailand) Sittichok Kannoo | (Thailand) Air Force Central F.C. | Season loan |
| FW | (Thailand) Sompong Soleb | (Thailand) Ratchaburi Mitr Phol F.C. | Season loan |
| FW | (Thailand) Teeratep Winothai | (Thailand) Chonburi F.C. | Season loan |
| GK | (Thailand) Kittipong Phuthawchueak | (Thailand) Ratchaburi Mitr Phol F.C. | Season loan |
| MF | (Thailand) Jakkapan Pornsai | (Thailand) Ratchaburi Mitr Phol F.C. | Season loan |

==== Retained ====
| Position | Player | Ref |
|---|---|---|
| GK | (Philippines) (Denmark) Michael Falkesgaard | |
| DF | (Thailand) (Germany) Manuel Bihr | |
| DF | (Thailand) (Wales) Mika Chunuonsee | |
| DF | (Brazil) Everton | |
| DF | (Thailand) (Germany) Alexander Sieghart | |
| MF | (Thailand) (United States) Anthony Ampaipitakwong | |
| MF | (Thailand) Sanrawat Dechmitr | |
| MF | (Thailand) Pokklaw Anan | |
| FW | (Brazil) Vander Luíz | |
| FW | (Brazil) Robson | |

==== Return from loan ====
| Position | Player | Transferred from | Ref |
|---|---|---|---|
| GK | (Thailand) Kittipong Phuthawchueak | (Thailand) Ratchaburi Mitr Phol | Loan Return |
| GK | (Thailand) Anusith Termmee | (Thailand) Chainat Hornbill | Loan Return |
| DF | (Thailand) Prat Samakrat | (Thailand) Sukhothai | Loan Return |
| DF | (Thailand) Noppol Pitafai | (Thailand) Suphanburi | Loan Return |
| DF | (Thailand) Surachet Ngamtip | (Thailand) Pattaya United | Loan Return |
| DF | (Thailand) Athatcha Rahongthong | (Thailand) Ubon UMT United | Loan Return |
| DF | (Thailand) (Spain) Ernesto Amantegui Phumipha | (Thailand) Air Force Central F.C. | Loan Return |
| DF | (Thailand) Jakkit Wachpirom | (Japan) FC Tokyo U-23 | Loan Return |
| MF | (Thailand) Sansern Limwattana | (Thailand) Sukhothai | Loan Return |
| MF | (Thailand) (Sweden) Oscar Kahl | (Thailand) Army United | Loan Return |
| MF | (Thailand) Pongsakon Seerot | (Thailand) Trat FC | Loan Return |
| MF | (Thailand) Jakkapan Pornsai | (Thailand) Ratchaburi Mitr Phol | Loan Return |
| MF | (Thailand) Jedsadakorn Kowngam | (Thailand) Ubon UMT United | Loan Return |
| FW | (Thailand) Sompong Soleb | (Thailand) Ratchaburi Mitr Phol | Loan Return |
| FW | (Argentina) (Palestine) Carlos Salom | (India) Chennaiyin FC | Loan Return |

=== Mid-season transfer ===
==== In ====
| Position | Player | Transferred from | Ref |
|---|---|---|---|
| FW | (Bahrain) Jaycee John Okwunwanne | (Malaysia) FELDA United | |
| FW | (Thailand) Chananan Pombuppha | (Thailand) Suphanburi F.C. | |

==== Out ====
| Position | Player | Transferred To | Ref |
|---|---|---|---|
| GK | (Thailand) Kittipong Phuthawchueak | (Thailand) Ratchaburi Mitr Phol F.C. | Season loan |
| MF | (Thailand) Jakkapan Pornsai | (Thailand) Ratchaburi Mitr Phol F.C. | Season loan |
| FW | (Thailand) Teeratep Winothai | (Thailand) Chonburi F.C. | Season loan |
| FW | (Brazil) Robson | | |
| FW | (Thailand) Sompong Soleb | (Thailand) Chonburi F.C. | Season loan |

== Friendlies ==
=== Pre-season friendly ===
Win Draw Loss

| 8 December 2018 1 | BG Pathum United (Thailand) | 0–3 | (Thailand) Bangkok United | BGFC Training Pitch |
| 17:00 UTC+7 | | | Sittichok Kannoo; Vander Luíz; Teeratep Winothai |

| 15 December 2018 2 | Lampang (Thailand) | 2–1 | (Thailand) Bangkok United | Lampang Province Stadium |
| 18:00 UTC+7 | | | Rungrath Poomchantuek |

| 21 December 2018 3 | JL Chiangmai United (Thailand) | 0–1 | (Thailand) Bangkok United | 700th Anniversary Stadium |
| 17:00 UTC+7 | | | Anon Amornlerdsak |

| 8 January 2019 4 | Ratchaburi Mitr Phol (Thailand) | 1–3 | (Thailand) Bangkok United | Mitr Phol Stadium |
| 18:00 UTC+7 | Nattawut Sombatyotha 10' | | Nelson Bonilla 35'; Robson 67', 90' |

| 13 January 2019 5 | PT Prachuap (Thailand) | 1–4 | (Thailand) Bangkok United | True Arena Hua Hin |
| 18:00 UTC+7 | Chitpanya Tisud 90+5' | | Nelson Bonilla 6', 67'; Teeratep Winothai 87'; Robson 90+1' |

| 17 January 2019 6 | Bangkok United (Thailand) | 0–1 | (Vietnam) Becamex Bình Dương | Pathum Thani |
| | | | Đinh Hoàng Max 48' | Stadium: True Stadium |

| 20 January 2019 7 | Bangkok United (Thailand) | 2–2 | (Malaysia) Johor Darul Ta'zim | Thammasat Stadium |
| 18:00 UTC+7 | Mike Havenaar 58'; Teeratep Winothai 85' | | Syafiq Ahmad 11'; Aarón Ñíguez 38' |

| 27 January 2019 8 | Hokkaido Consadole Sapporo (Japan) | 5–1 | (Thailand) Bangkok United | SCG Stadium |
| 18:00 UTC+7 | Anderson Lopes 12'; Chanathip Songkrasin 16'; Lucas Fernandes 38'; Musashi Suzuki 48', 85' | | Nelson Bonilla 24' |

=== Mid-season friendly ===
| 8 June 2019 1 | (Thailand) Bangkok United F.C. | 4–4 | (Thailand) Police Tero | Pathum Thani |
| 17:00 UTC+7 | Jaycee John 34'; Teeratep Winothai 60', 75'; Everton 81' | | Isaac Honny 11'; Pathompol Charoenrattanapirom 29', 36'; Adisak Srikampang 40' | Stadium: True Stadium |

| 19 June 2019 2 | (Thailand) Bangkok United F.C. | 4–2 | (Singapore) Young Lions FC | Rangsit, Bangkok |
| | | | Sharul Nizam; Rasaq Ishiekwene Akeem | Stadium: Thammasat Stadium |

== Competitions ==
=== Overview ===
| Competition | First match | Last match | Starting round | Final position | Record | | | | | | | |
| Competition | First match | Last match | Starting round | Final position | Pld | W | D | L | GF | GA | GD | Win % |
|---|---|---|---|---|---|---|---|---|---|---|---|---|
| Thai League | 23 February 2019 | 27 October 2019 | Matchday 1 | Fourth Place | 30 | 13 | 11 | 6 | 55 | 32 | +23 | 43.33 |
| FA Cup | 1 May 2019 | 18 September 2019 | First round | Semi-finals | 5 | 4 | 1 | 0 | 12 | 1 | +11 | 80.00 |
| League Cup | 15 May 2019 | 24 July 2019 | First round | Quarter-finals | 3 | 2 | 0 | 1 | 5 | 3 | +2 | 66.67 |
| Champions League | 12 February 2019 | | Preliminary round 2 | Preliminary round 2 | 1 | 0 | 0 | 1 | 0 | 1 | −1 | 0.00 |
| Total | | | | | 39 | 19 | 12 | 8 | 72 | 37 | +35 | 48.72 |

Last updated: 26 October 2019
Source: Competitions

=== Thai League ===
==== League table ====
| Pos | Team | Pld | W | D | L | GF | GA | GD | Pts | Qualification or relegation |
|---|---|---|---|---|---|---|---|---|---|---|
| 2 | Buriram United (Q) | 30 | 16 | 10 | 4 | 51 | 25 | +26 | 58 (Note: Chiangrai United finished ahead of Buriram United on head-to-head points: Buriram United 0–0 Chiangrai United, Chiangrai United 4–0 Buriram United.) | Qualification for AFC Champions League preliminary round 2 (Note: Port qualified for the AFC Champions League preliminary round 2 as 2019 Thai FA Cup winners.) |
| 3 | Port (Q) | 30 | 15 | 8 | 7 | 55 | 36 | +19 | 53 | Qualification for AFC Champions League preliminary round 2 |
| 4 | Bangkok United | 30 | 13 | 11 | 6 | 55 | 32 | +23 | 50 | |
| 5 | Muangthong United | 30 | 14 | 4 | 12 | 45 | 42 | +3 | 46 | |
| 6 | Samut Prakan City | 30 | 12 | 7 | 11 | 44 | 50 | −6 | 43 | |

Source: Thai League
Rules for classification: 1) Points; 2) Head-to-head points; 3) Head-to-head goals difference; 4) Head-to-head goals scored; 5) Overall goals difference; 6) Overall goals scored; 7) Fair play points; 8) Play-off without extra time;).
(Q) Qualified for the phase indicated

==== Results summary ====
| Overall | | | | | | | | Home | | | | | | Away | | | | | |
| Pld | W | D | L | GF | GA | GD | Pts | W | D | L | GF | GA | GD | W | D | L | GF | GA | GD |
|---|---|---|---|---|---|---|---|---|---|---|---|---|---|---|---|---|---|---|---|
| 30 | 13 | 11 | 6 | 55 | 32 | +23 | 50 | 10 | 3 | 2 | 34 | 13 | +21 | 3 | 8 | 4 | 21 | 19 | +2 |

==== Results by matchday ====
| Matchday | 1 | 2 | 3 | 4 | 5 | 6 | 7 | 8 | 9 | 10 | 11 | 12 | 13 | 14 | 15 | 16 | 17 | 18 | 19 | 20 | 21 | 22 | 23 | 24 | 25 | 26 | 27 | 28 | 29 | 30 |
|---|---|---|---|---|---|---|---|---|---|---|---|---|---|---|---|---|---|---|---|---|---|---|---|---|---|---|---|---|---|---|
| Ground | A | H | A | H | A | H | H | A | H | A | A | H | A | H | A | H | A | H | A | H | A | A | H | A | H | A | H | H | A | H |
| Result | D | W | W | L | D | L | W | L | W | D | D | W | W | W | W | D | L | W | D | D | L | D | W | L | W | D | D | W | D | W |
| Position | 7 | 3 | 2 | 6 | 4 | 7 | 5 | 6 | 5 | 6 | 7 | 4 | 2 | 3 | 2 | 2 | 4 | 3 | 3 | 4 | 5 | 4 | 4 | 4 | 4 | 4 | 4 | 4 | 4 | 4 |

Source: Thai League T1
A = Away; H = Home; W = Win; D = Draw; L = Loss

==== Matches ====
| 24 February 2019 1 | Sukhothai | 1–1 | True Bangkok United | Sukhothai |
| 18:00 UTC+7 | Baggio (yellow card) 50'; Orlandić (yellow card) 56'; Kongnathichai 77'; Singh Ferns (yellow card) 90+1' | Report | Tristan 31'; Sanrawat (yellow card) 44'; Vander (yellow card) 45' | Stadium: Thung Thalay Luang Stadium; Attendance: 6,052; Referee: Warintorn Sassadee; Man of the Match: Baggio Rakotonomenjanahary |

| 2 March 2019 2 | True Bangkok United | 1–0 | Muangthong United | Pathum Thani |
| 20:00 UTC+7 | Wisarut (yellow card) 48'; Mika (yellow card) 51'; Bonilla 63'; Peerapat (yellow card) 75' | Report | Ban-suk (yellow card) 25'; Sarach (yellow card) 82' | Stadium: True Stadium; Attendance: 12,826; Referee: Anusorn Nukaew; Man of the Match: Nelson Bonilla |

| 9 March 2019 3 | Trat | 0–1 | True Bangkok United | Trat |
| 17:45 UTC+7 | Pichit (yellow card) 22' | Report | Peerapat (yellow card) 64'; Bonilla 66'; Wisarut (yellow card) 88' | Stadium: Trat Province Stadium; Attendance: 4,955; Referee: Sahaphop Sriboonlue; Man of the Match: Nelson Bonilla |

| 17 March 2019 4 | True Bangkok United | 0–1 | Buriram United | Pathum Thani |
| 19:00 UTC+7 | Pokklaw (yellow card) 43'; Teeratep (yellow card) 60'; Tristan (yellow card) 85' | Report | Pedro (yellow card) 22', (goal) 84'; Supachok (yellow card) 28' | Stadium: True Stadium; Attendance: 15,155; Referee: Wiwat Chumpa-on; Man of the Match: Pedro Júnior |

| 30 March 2019 5 | Nakhon Ratchasima | 1–1 | True Bangkok United | Nakhon Ratchasima |
| 17:45 UTC+7 | Metee 37'; Kitsada (yellow card) 66' | Report | Anon 57'; Sanrawat (yellow card) 74' | Stadium: 80th Birthday Stadium; Attendance: 10,807; Referee: Chaireag Ngamsom; Man of the Match: Michael Falkesgaard |

| 3 April 2019 6 | True Bangkok United | 2–4 | Chonburi | Pathum Thani |
| 19:00 UTC+7 | Bonilla 48' (pen.); Bihr (yellow card) 62'; Havenaar 73'; Sanrawat (red card) 76' | Report | Lukian 28', 53'; Phanuphong 34'; Gyeong-min (yellow card) 47'; Sithu Aung 80' | Stadium: True Stadium; Attendance: 2,692; Referee: Natee Choosuwan; Man of the Match: Lukian |

| 6 April 2019 7 | True Bangkok United | 4–0 | Suphanburi | Pathum Thani |
| 19:00 UTC+7 | Bonilla 31' (pen.), 57'; Havenaar 45+1'; Atit 90+1' (o.g.); Teeratep (yellow card) 89' | Report | Sung-hwan (yellow card) 27'; Anderson (yellow card) 56'; Suphan (yellow card) 67'; Prasit (yellow card) 86' | Stadium: True Stadium; Attendance: 3,066; Referee: Wiwat Chumpa-on; Man of the Match: Nelson Bonilla |

| 20 April 2019 8 | Chainat Hornbill | 2–1 | True Bangkok United | Chai Nat |
| 20:00 UTC+7 | Santos 38', (red card) 78'; Kiatisak 53', (yellow card) 68'; Chatchai (yellow card) 56' | Report | Wisarut (yellow card) 39'; Anon (yellow card) 50'; Tristan (yellow card) 60'; Rungrath (yellow card) 66'; Teeratep 75' | Stadium: Khao Plong Stadium; Attendance: 5,254; Referee: Kodchaphoom Meesridecha; Man of the Match: Santipap Ratniyom |

| 28 April 2019 9 | True Bangkok United | 6–1 | PT Prachuap | Pathum Thani |
| 19:00 UTC+7 | Sanrawat 5'; Bonilla 23', 69' (pen.), 84'; Thossawat 90'; Teeratep 90+3' | Report | Alves 7'; Seeket (yellow card) 63'; Nattapon (red card) 76' | Stadium: True Stadium; Attendance: 2,989; Referee: Wiwat Chumpa-on; Man of the Match: Nelson Bonilla |

| 12 May 2019 10 | Chiangmai | 1–1 | True Bangkok United | Chiang Mai |
| 18:00 UTC+7 | Eliandro 19' | Report | Bonilla 17'; Anthony (yellow card) 72' | Stadium: 700th Anniversary Stadium; Attendance: 2,952; Referee: Songkran Bunmeekiat; Man of the Match: Eliandro |

| 18 May 2019 11 | Port | 1–1 | True Bangkok United | Bangkok |
| 19:00 UTC+7 | Dolah 12'; Seul-ki (yellow card) 24'; Todsapol (yellow card) 69'; Suárez (red card) 82' | Report | Peerapat (yellow card) 8'; Bonilla 13', (yellow card) 69'; Pokklaw (yellow card) 36'; Wisarut (yellow card) 86'; Vander (yellow card) 90+3'; Sanrawat (red card) 90+3' | Stadium: PAT Stadium; Attendance: 7,960; Referee: Akom Charoensuk; Man of the Match: Michael Falkesgaard |

| 26 May 2019 12 | True Bangkok United | 2–1 | Samut Prakan | Pathum Thani |
| 18:00 UTC+7 | Bonilla 49'; Tristan 56'; Vander (yellow card) 83' | Report | Ibson Melo 36'; Jakkapan (yellow card) 57' | Stadium: True Stadium; Attendance: 2,431; Referee: Athiwat Srilao; Man of the Match: Tristan Do |

| 29 May 2019 13 | Chiangrai United | 1–3 | True Bangkok United | Chiang Rai |
| 19:00 UTC+7 | Somkid (yellow card) 13'; Tanasak (yellow card) 69'; Phitiwat 74'; Atthawit (yellow card) 75'; Decha (red card) 87' | Report | Thossawat (yellow card) 43'; Pokklaw 47'; Everton 66'; Vander 81' | Stadium: Singha Stadium; Attendance: 3,707; Referee: Chaireag Ngamsom; Man of the Match: Nelson Bonilla |

| 16 June 2019 14 | True Bangkok United | 2–0 | Ratchaburi Mitr Phol | Pathum Thani |
| 18:00 UTC+7 | Vander 56', (yellow card) 89'; Wisarut (yellow card) 90+2'; Pawee 90+3' (o.g.) | Report | Kritsananon (yellow card) 70'; Pawee (yellow card) 72' | Stadium: True Stadium; Attendance: 2,068; Referee: Torpong Somsingha; Man of the Match: Vander |

| 23 June 2019 15 | PTT Rayong | 1–4 | True Bangkok United | Rayong |
| 18:00 UTC+7 | Cardozo 48'; Sarayut (yellow card) 55'; Rodríguez (yellow card) 81' | Report | Havenaar 4'; Pokklaw (yellow card) 40', (goal) 86'; Anon 41'; Mika (yellow card) 68'; Falkesgaard (yellow card) 73'; Wisarut 77' | Stadium: PTT Stadium; Attendance: 3,947; Referee: Torpong Somsingha; Man of the Match: Anon Amornlerdsak |

| 29 June 2019 16 | True Bangkok United | 2–2 | Sukhothai | Pathum Thani |
| 17:45 UTC+7 | Myung-oh 58' (o.g.); Anon 69' | Report | Baggio 52'; Myung-oh 77'; Kittikun (yellow card) 83' | Stadium: True Stadium; Attendance: 2,484; Referee: Mongkolchai Pechsri; Man of the Match: John Baggio |

| 7 July 2019 17 | Muangthong United | 3–2 | True Bangkok United | Nonthaburi |
| 19:00 UTC+7 | Chappuis (yellow card) 30'; Suphanan (yellow card) 41'; Gallo 42'; Teerasil 68'; Ernesto (yellow card) 79'; Heberty 90+1' | Report | Pokklaw 19'; Mika (yellow card) 40'; Anon (yellow card) 45+2'; Bonilla 55'; Everton (yellow card) 69' | Stadium: SCG Stadium; Attendance: 12,418; Referee: Chaireag Ngamsom; Man of the Match: Michael Falkesgaard |

| 14 July 2019 18 | True Bangkok United | 2–1 | Trat | Pathum Thani |
| 18:00 UTC+7 | Ekkachai (yellow card) 44'; Bonilla 54', 78'; Anon (yellow card) 59'; Anthony (yellow card) 68', (red card) 90+4'; Thossawat (yellow card) 90+3'; Everton (yellow card) 90+4' | Report | Pichit (yellow card) 42'; Durosinmi 48'; Worawut (yellow card) 86', (red card) 90+1' | Stadium: True Stadium; Attendance: 2,548; Referee: Sivakorn Pu-udom; Man of the Match: Vander |

| 21 July 2019 19 | Buriram United | 1–1 | True Bangkok United | Buriram |
| 18:00 UTC+7 | Barazite 31'; Túñez (yellow card) 61' | Report | Everton (yellow card) 42', (goal) 45'; Mika (yellow card) 47'; Pokklaw (yellow card) 90+3', (red card) 90+4' | Stadium: Chang Arena; Attendance: 13,242; Referee: Nathee Choosuwan; Man of the Match: Supachok Sarachat |

| 28 July 2019 20 | True Bangkok United | 2–2 | Nakhon Ratchasima | Pathum Thani |
| 18:00 UTC+7 | Sieghart (yellow card) 7'; Putthinan (yellow card) 56'; Vander (yellow card) 77'; Chananan 81'; Bonilla 84' | Report | Attapong (yellow card) 21'; Eakkanut (yellow card) 41'; Henry 47' (pen.), 58'; Rachan (yellow card) 80'; Cunningham (yellow card) 83' | Stadium: True Stadium; Attendance: 2,362; Referee: Tastarawut Khantavichai; Man of the Match: Benard Henry |

| 31 July 2019 21 | Chonburi | 2–1 | True Bangkok United | Chonburi |
| 19:00 UTC+7 | Caion 32', (yellow card) 81'; Mongkol (yellow card) 55'; Sittichok 62'; Wittaya (red card) 90+2' | Report | Bihr (yellow card) 67'; Mika (yellow card) 83'; Ekkachai (yellow card) 88'; Bonilla 90+6' (pen.) | Stadium: Chonburi Stadium; Attendance: 4,829; Referee: Mongkolchai Pechsri; Man of the Match: Caion |

| 4 August 2019 22 | Suphanburi | 1–1 | True Bangkok United | Suphan Buri |
| 18:00 UTC+7 | Atit (yellow card) 43'; Tinnakorn (yellow card) 77'; Sung-hwan 83'; Silva (yellow card) 85'; Dellatorre (yellow card) 86'; Chutipol (yellow card) 90+4' | Report | Vander 67', (yellow card) 76'; Pokklaw (red card) 70'; Sanrawat (yellow card) 75'; Everton (yellow card) 90+4' | Stadium: Suphan Buri Provincial Stadium; Attendance: 7,942; Referee: Sarayuth Chaknguen; Man of the Match: Patrick Deyto |

| 10 August 2019 23 | True Bangkok United | 2–0 | Chainat Hornbill | Pathum Thani |
| 20:00 UTC+7 | Sanrawat 48'; Vander 64'; Ekkachai (yellow card) 90+3' | Report | | Stadium: True Stadium; Attendance: 2,312; Referee: Suwat Wongsuwan; Man of the Match: Vander |

| 17 August 2019 24 | PT Prachuap | 1–0 | True Bangkok United | Prachuap Khiri Khan |
| 17:45 UTC+7 | Phuritad (yellow card) 7'; Supot 15' | Report | Anon (yellow card) 48'; Bihr (yellow card) 89' | Stadium: Sam Ao Stadium; Attendance: 3,819; Referee: Songkran Bunmeekiart |

| 24 August 2019 25 | True Bangkok United | 2–0 | Port | Pathum Thani |
| 19:00 UTC+7 | Bihr (yellow card) 29'; Peerapat (yellow card) 42'; Chananan 50'; Everton (yellow card) 72', (goal) 88'; Falkesgaard (yellow card) 90+3' | Report | Tanaboon (yellow card) 44'; Elias (yellow card) 86' | Stadium: True Stadium; Attendance: 8,376; Referee: Wiwat Chumpa-on; Man of the Match: Vander Luiz |

| 14 September 2019 26 | Samut Prakan City | 1–1 | True Bangkok United | Samut Prakan |
| 20:00 UTC+7 | Baworn (yellow card) 22'; Picha (yellow card) 52'; Jaroensak 60'; Teeraphol (yellow card) 63' | Report | Vander (yellow card) 4', (goal) 26'; Anon (yellow card) 70'; Thossawat (yellow card) 90+4' | Stadium: Samut Prakarn SAT Stadium; Attendance: 1,495; Referee: Torphong Somsingh; Man of the Match: Michael Falkesgaard |

| 21 September 2019 27 | True Bangkok United | 1–1 | Chiangrai United | Pathum Thani |
| 18:00 UTC+7 | Ekkachai (yellow card) 50'; Vander 66' (pen.), (yellow card) 70'; Everton (yellow card) 74' | Report | Bill 16'; Sivakorn (yellow card) 41'; Chaiyawat (yellow card) 58'; Peerapong (yellow card) 63'; Ekanit (yellow card) 90+2' | Stadium: True Stadium; Attendance: 2,892; Referee: Wiwat Chumpa-on; Man of the Match: Bill |

| 2 October 2019 28 | True Bangkok United | 2–0 | Chiangmai | Pathum Thani |
| 17:45 UTC+7 | Putthinan (yellow card) 40'; Thossawat (yellow card) 78'; Sanrawat 86', 90+2' | Report | Evson (yellow card) 45+2'; Caíque (yellow card) 80'; Wanmai (yellow card) 90' | Stadium: True Stadium; Attendance: 1,278; Referee: Phanumat Pansamo; Man of the Match: Peerapat Notchaiya |

| 20 October 2019 29 | Ratchaburi Mitr Phol | 2–2 | True Bangkok United | Ratchaburi |
| 20:00 UTC+7 | Ekkaluck (yellow card) 21'; Roller (yellow card) 43'; Patiño 77', 82' | Report | Peerapat 37', (yellow card) 90+2'; Anon 50'; Chayathorn (yellow card) 81'; Warut (yellow card) 90+3' | Stadium: Mitr Phol Stadium; Attendance: 4,297; Referee: Anusorn Nukaew |

| 26 October 2019 30 | True Bangkok United | 4–0 | PTT Rayong | Pathum Thani |
| 18:00 UTC+7 | Anon 45+1'; Tristan 65'; Wisarut 69'; Guntapon 86' | Report | Apipoo (yellow card) 73'; Rodríguez (yellow card) 88' | Stadium: True Stadium; Attendance: 2,194; Referee: Noppadech Muangngam |

=== FA Cup ===
| 1 May 2019 First round | Chiangmai Dream FC | 0–7 | True Bangkok United | Chiang Mai |
| 17.00 UTC+7 | | Report | Bonilla 12'; Everton 19'; Robson 23'; Guntapon 47', 61'; Sieghart 70', 84' | Stadium: Muang Chiangmai Stadium; Attendance: 886; Referee: Teetichai Nualjan; Man of the Match: Alexander Sieghart |

| 19 June 2019 Second round | BG Pathum United | 0–1 | True Bangkok United | Pathum Thani |
| 19.00 UTC+7 | Eakkalak (yellow card) 61'; Toti (yellow card) 70' | Report | Pokklaw (yellow card) 26'; Robson 39', (yellow card) 57'; Thossawat (yellow card) 79'; Wisarut (yellow card) 90+4' | Stadium: Leo Stadium; Attendance: 2,226; Referee: Sarayuth Chaknguen; Man of the Match: Robson |

| 17 July 2019 Third round | True Bangkok United | 3–1 | Police Tero | Pathum Thani |
| 19.00 UTC+7 | Jaycee; Thossawat (yellow card) 53' | Report | Adisak 31'; Nattapon (yellow card) 76'; Sitthichok (yellow card) 83'; Thitawee (yellow card) 86'; Dae-hee (yellow card) 90' | Stadium: True Stadium; Attendance: 1,596; Referee: Kodchaphoom Meesridecha; Man of the Match: Jaycee John |

| 7 August 2019 Quarter-finals | Nakhon Ratchasima | 0–1 (a.e.t.) | True Bangkok United | Nakhon Ratchasima |
| 18.00 UTC+7 | Weerawat (yellow card) 51'; Nonthawat (yellow card) 91'; Chalermpong (yellow card) 97' | Report | Sieghart (yellow card) 18'; Vander (yellow card) 27' , (goal) 114'; Everton (yellow card) 57'; Pokklaw (yellow card) 71'; Bihr (yellow card) 76'; Wisarut (yellow card) 95'; Wanchai (yellow card) 104'; Chayathorn (yellow card) 120' | Stadium: 80th Birthday Stadium; Attendance: 3,237; Referee: Sivakorn Pu-udom; Man of the Match: Vander |

| 18 September 2019 Semi-finals | True Bangkok United | 0–0 (a.e.t.) (4–5 p) | Port | Bangkok |
| 19.00 UTC+7 | Peerapat (yellow card) 18'; Bihr (yellow card) 39'; Thossawat (yellow card) 53'; Vander (yellow card) 120' | Report | Siwakorn (yellow card) 59' , (red card) 88'; Seul-ki (yellow card) 62'; Rattanai (yellow card) 119' | Stadium: Royal Thai Army Stadium; Attendance: 5,323; Referee: Chaireag Ngamsom |
| | Penalties |
| | Vander (penalty scored); Everton (penalty missed); Bihr (penalty scored); Anon (penalty scored); Sanrawat (penalty scored); Guntapon (penalty missed) | | (penalty scored) Blackburn; (penalty scored) Rochela; (penalty missed) Dolah; (penalty scored) Seul-ki; (penalty scored) Tanaboon; (penalty scored) Nitipong |

=== League Cup ===
| 15 May 2019 First round | Sisaket FC | 1–3 | True Bangkok United | Sisaket |
| 18.00 UTC+7 | Babo 47'; Krismas (yellow card) 90+1' | Report | Everton 45'; Sieghart (yellow card) 47' , (goal) 67'; Teeratep 77'; Robson (yellow card) 90+1' | Stadium: Sri Nakhon Lamduan Stadium; Attendance: 1,535; Referee: Phanumat Pansamo; Man of the Match: Alexander Sieghart |

| 3 July 2019 Second round | Muang Loei United | 1–2 | True Bangkok United | Loei |
| 15.30 UTC+7 | Amronphun (yellow card) 66'; Jessada (yellow card) 77'; Witthaya 89' | Report | Havenaar 19'; Sanrawat 32'; Wanchai (yellow card) 58'; Jaycee (yellow card) 69'; Thossawat (yellow card) 90+1'; Guntapon (yellow card) 90+3' | Stadium: Wang Saphung Stadium; Attendance: 1,052; Referee: Pichit Na Suwan; Man of the Match: Putthinan Wannasri |

| 24 July 2019 Quarter-finals | True Bangkok United | 0–1 (a.e.t.) | Buriram United | Pathum Thani |
| 19.00 UTC+7 | Bihr (yellow card) 46'; Bonilla (yellow card) 68' | Report | Apiwat (yellow card) 19'; Hosogai (yellow card) 57'; Palla (yellow card) 75'; Túñez (yellow card) 102'; Barazite 113'; Siwarak (yellow card) 119' | Stadium: True Stadium; Attendance: 4,713; Referee: Visavet Sangnakorn; Man of the Match: Michael Falkesgaard |

=== AFC Champions League ===
Win Draw Loss

==== Qualifying play-off ====
| 12 February 2019 Preliminary round 2 | True Bangkok United (Thailand) | 0–1 | (Vietnam) Hà Nội F.C. | Pathum Thani |
| 19.00 UTC+7 | Everton (yellow card) 18'; Vander (yellow card) 88'; Tristan (yellow card) 89' | Report | Văn Hậu (yellow card) 11'; Văn Quyết 89' (pen.); Văn Công (yellow card) 90+4' | Stadium: True Stadium; Attendance: 5,384; Referee: Mooud Bonyadifar (Iran); Man of the Match: Nguyễn Văn Quyết |

== Statistics ==
=== Appearances and goals ===
| No. | Pos | Nat | Player | Total | | Thai League 1 | | FA Cup | | League Cup | | Champions League | |
| No. | Pos | Nat | Player | Apps | Goals | Apps | Goals | Apps | Goals | Apps | Goals | Apps | Goals |
Goalkeepers
| 1 | GK | (Philippines) PHI | Michael Falkesgaard | 34 | 0 | 28 | 0 | 4 | 0 | 1 | 0 | 1 | 0 |
| 34 | GK | (Thailand) THA | Warut Mekmusik | 5 | 0 | 2 | 0 | 1 | 0 | 2 | 0 | 0 | 0 |
Defenders
| 2 | DF | (Thailand) THA | Ekkachai Sumrei | 13 | 0 | 6+2 | 0 | 2 | 0 | 3 | 0 | 0 | 0 |
| 3 | DF | (Brazil) BRA | Everton | 36 | 5 | 29 | 3 | 4 | 1 | 2 | 1 | 1 | 0 |
| 4 | DF | (Thailand) THA | Manuel Bihr | 32 | 0 | 25+1 | 0 | 4 | 0 | 1 | 0 | 1 | 0 |
| 5 | DF | (Thailand) THA | Putthinan Wannasri | 22 | 0 | 10+5 | 0 | 2+2 | 0 | 2+1 | 0 | 0 | 0 |
| 7 | DF | (Thailand) THA | Tristan Do | 23 | 3 | 20+1 | 3 | 1 | 0 | 0 | 0 | 1 | 0 |
| 16 | DF | (Thailand) THA | Mika Chunuonsee | 16 | 0 | 8+2 | 0 | 3 | 0 | 1+1 | 0 | 1 | 0 |
| 24 | DF | (Thailand) THA | Wanchai Jarunongkran | 15 | 0 | 6+3 | 0 | 3 | 0 | 3 | 0 | 0 | 0 |
| 31 | DF | (Thailand) THA | Peerapat Notchaiya | 26 | 1 | 22 | 1 | 2 | 0 | 0+1 | 0 | 1 | 0 |
| 45 | DF | (Thailand) THA | Santipap Yaemsaen | 1 | 0 | 0 | 0 | 0 | 0 | 0+1 | 0 | 0 | 0 |
| 79 | DF | (Thailand) THA | Surachet Ngamtip | 1 | 0 | 0+1 | 0 | 0 | 0 | 0 | 0 | 0 | 0 |
Midfielders
| 6 | MF | (Thailand) THA | Anthony Ampaipitakwong | 23 | 0 | 18+1 | 0 | 2 | 0 | 1 | 0 | 1 | 0 |
| 8 | MF | (Brazil) BRA | Vander | 25 | 7 | 15+5 | 6 | 3 | 1 | 1 | 0 | 1 | 0 |
| 10 | MF | (Thailand) THA | Pokklaw Anan | 33 | 3 | 27 | 3 | 4 | 0 | 1 | 0 | 1 | 0 |
| 17 | MF | (Thailand) THA | Rungrath Poomchantuek | 9 | 0 | 1+5 | 0 | 1 | 0 | 1 | 0 | 0+1 | 0 |
| 18 | MF | (Thailand) THA | Alexander Sieghart | 15 | 3 | 5+4 | 0 | 2+1 | 2 | 2+1 | 1 | 0 | 0 |
| 27 | MF | (Thailand) THA | Anon Amornlerdsak | 33 | 5 | 23+4 | 5 | 4+1 | 0 | 0 | 0 | 1 | 0 |
| 28 | MF | (Thailand) THA | Thossawat Limwannasathian | 31 | 1 | 15+8 | 1 | 4 | 0 | 2+1 | 0 | 0+1 | 0 |
| 29 | MF | (Thailand) THA | Sanrawat Dechmitr | 25 | 5 | 14+3 | 4 | 3+2 | 0 | 2 | 1 | 0+1 | 0 |
| 37 | MF | (Thailand) THA | Wisarut Imura | 30 | 2 | 21+5 | 2 | 2+1 | 0 | 1 | 0 | 0 | 0 |
| 39 | MF | (Thailand) THA | Jirayu Niamthaisong | 1 | 0 | 0 | 0 | 0 | 0 | 0+1 | 0 | 0 | 0 |
| 48 | MF | (Thailand) THA | Chayathorn Tapsuvanavon | 11 | 0 | 4+3 | 0 | 0+2 | 0 | 1+1 | 0 | 0 | 0 |
Forwards
| 9 | FW | (Japan) JPN | Mike Havenaar | 8 | 4 | 4+3 | 3 | 0 | 0 | 1 | 1 | 0 | 0 |
| 11 | FW | (El Salvador) SLV | Nelson Bonilla | 23 | 17 | 17+3 | 16 | 1 | 1 | 1 | 0 | 1 | 0 |
| 20 | FW | (Thailand) THA | Chananan Pombuppha | 13 | 2 | 8+5 | 2 | 0 | 0 | 0 | 0 | 0 | 0 |
| 22 | FW | (Bahrain) BHR | Jaycee John Okwunwanne | 11 | 3 | 1+6 | 0 | 2+1 | 3 | 1 | 0 | 0 | 0 |
| 89 | FW | (Thailand) THA | Veerapat Nilburapha | 2 | 0 | 0+1 | 0 | 0 | 0 | 0+1 | 0 | 0 | 0 |
| 97 | FW | (Thailand) THA | Guntapon Keereeleang | 8 | 3 | 1+3 | 1 | 1+2 | 2 | 0+1 | 0 | 0 | 0 |
Players transferred out during the season
| 14 | FW | (Thailand) THA | Teeratep Winothai | 10 | 3 | 3+5 | 2 | 0+1 | 0 | 1 | 1 | 0 | 0 |
| 15 | MF | (Thailand) THA | Jakkapan Pornsai | 6 | 0 | 1+3 | 0 | 0+1 | 0 | 1 | 0 | 0 | 0 |
| 30 | FW | (Brazil) BRA | Robson | 3 | 2 | 0 | 0 | 2 | 2 | 1 | 0 | 0 | 0 |
| 41 | DF | (Thailand) THA | Athatcha Rahongthong | 1 | 0 | 0+1 | 0 | 0 | 0 | 0 | 0 | 0 | 0 |

Last updated: 26 October 2019
Source: Competitions

=== Top scorers ===
| Rank | No. | Pos. | Player | Thai League | FA Cup | League Cup | Champions League | Total |
|---|---|---|---|---|---|---|---|---|
| 1 | 11 | FW | (El Salvador) Nelson Bonilla | 16 | 1 | 0 | 0 | 17 |
| 2 | 8 | MF | (Brazil) Vander | 6 | 1 | 0 | 0 | 7 |
| 3 | 3 | DF | (Brazil) Everton | 3 | 1 | 1 | 0 | 5 |
| 3 | 29 | MF | (Thailand) Sanrawat Dechmitr | 4 | 0 | 1 | 0 | 5 |
| 3 | 27 | MF | (Thailand) Anon Amornlerdsak | 5 | 0 | 0 | 0 | 5 |
| 4 | 9 | FW | (Japan) Mike Havenaar | 3 | 0 | 1 | 0 | 4 |
| 5 | 18 | MF | (Thailand) Alexander Sieghart | 0 | 2 | 1 | 0 | 3 |
| 5 | 14 | FW | (Thailand) Teeratep Winothai | 2 | 0 | 1 | 0 | 3 |
| 5 | 10 | MF | (Thailand) Pokklaw Anan | 3 | 0 | 0 | 0 | 3 |
| 5 | 22 | FW | (Bahrain) Jaycee John | 0 | 3 | 0 | 0 | 3 |
| 5 | 97 | FW | (Thailand) Guntapon Keereeleang | 1 | 2 | 0 | 0 | 3 |
| 5 | 7 | DF | (Thailand) Tristan Do | 3 | 0 | 0 | 0 | 3 |
| 6 | 30 | FW | (Brazil) Robson | 0 | 2 | 0 | 0 | 2 |
| 6 | 20 | FW | (Thailand) Chananan Pombuppha | 2 | 0 | 0 | 0 | 2 |
| 6 | 37 | MF | (Thailand) Wisarut Imura | 2 | 0 | 0 | 0 | 2 |
| 7 | 28 | MF | (Thailand) Thossawat Limwannasathian | 1 | 0 | 0 | 0 | 1 |
| 7 | 31 | DF | (Thailand) Peerapat Notchaiya | 1 | 0 | 0 | 0 | 1 |
| Own goals | | | | 3 | 0 | 0 | 0 | 3 |
| Totals | | | | 55 | 12 | 5 | 0 | 72 |

Last updated: 26 October 2019
Source: Competitions

=== Clean sheets ===
| Rank | No. | Pos. | Player | Thai League | FA Cup | League Cup | Champions League | Total |
|---|---|---|---|---|---|---|---|---|
| 1 | 1 | GK | (Philippines) Michael Falkesgaard | 7 | 3 | 0 | 0 | 10 |
| 2 | 34 | GK | (Thailand) Warut Mekmusik | 1 | 1 | 0 | 0 | 2 |
| Totals | | | | 8 | 4 | 0 | 0 | 12 |

Last updated: 26 October 2019
Source: Competitions

=== Disciplinary record ===
As of match played 26 October 2019

| No. | Pos. | Player | Thai League | | | FA Cup | | | League Cup | | | AFC Champions League | | | Total | | |
| No. | Pos. | Player | Booked | (yellow card) (yellow-red card) | Sent off (straight red) | Booked | (yellow card) (yellow-red card) | Sent off (straight red) | Booked | (yellow card) (yellow-red card) | Sent off (straight red) | Booked | (yellow card) (yellow-red card) | Sent off (straight red) | Booked | (yellow card) (yellow-red card) | Sent off (straight red) |
|---|---|---|---|---|---|---|---|---|---|---|---|---|---|---|---|---|---|
| 1 | GK | (Philippines) Michael Falkesgaard | 2 | 0 | 0 | 0 | 0 | 0 | 0 | 0 | 0 | 0 | 0 | 0 | 2 | 0 | 0 |
| 2 | DF | (Thailand) Ekkachai Sumrei | 4 | 0 | 0 | 0 | 0 | 0 | 0 | 0 | 0 | 0 | 0 | 0 | 4 | 0 | 0 |
| 3 | DF | (Brazil) Everton | 6 | 0 | 0 | 1 | 0 | 0 | 0 | 0 | 0 | 1 | 0 | 0 | 8 | 0 | 0 |
| 4 | DF | (Thailand) Manuel Bihr | 4 | 0 | 0 | 2 | 0 | 0 | 1 | 0 | 0 | 0 | 0 | 0 | 7 | 0 | 0 |
| 5 | DF | (Thailand) Putthinan Wannasri | 2 | 0 | 0 | 0 | 0 | 0 | 0 | 0 | 0 | 0 | 0 | 0 | 2 | 0 | 0 |
| 6 | MF | (Thailand) Anthony Ampaipitakwong | 3 | 1 | 0 | 0 | 0 | 0 | 0 | 0 | 0 | 0 | 0 | 0 | 3 | 1 | 0 |
| 7 | DF | (Thailand) Tristan Do | 3 | 0 | 0 | 0 | 0 | 0 | 0 | 0 | 0 | 1 | 0 | 0 | 4 | 0 | 0 |
| 8 | MF | (Brazil) Vander | 8 | 0 | 0 | 2 | 0 | 0 | 0 | 0 | 0 | 1 | 0 | 0 | 11 | 0 | 0 |
| 10 | MF | (Thailand) Pokklaw Anan | 5 | 1 | 1 | 2 | 0 | 0 | 0 | 0 | 0 | 0 | 0 | 0 | 7 | 1 | 1 |
| 11 | FW | (El Salvador) Nelson Bonilla | 1 | 0 | 0 | 0 | 0 | 0 | 1 | 0 | 0 | 0 | 0 | 0 | 2 | 0 | 0 |
| 14 | FW | (Thailand) Teeratep Winothai | 1 | 0 | 0 | 0 | 0 | 0 | 0 | 0 | 0 | 0 | 0 | 0 | 1 | 0 | 0 |
| 16 | DF | (Thailand) Mika Chunuonsee | 5 | 0 | 0 | 0 | 0 | 0 | 0 | 0 | 0 | 0 | 0 | 0 | 5 | 0 | 0 |
| 17 | MF | (Thailand) Rungrath Poomchantuek | 1 | 0 | 0 | 0 | 0 | 0 | 0 | 0 | 0 | 0 | 0 | 0 | 1 | 0 | 0 |
| 18 | MF | (Thailand) Alexander Sieghart | 1 | 0 | 0 | 1 | 0 | 0 | 1 | 0 | 0 | 0 | 0 | 0 | 3 | 0 | 0 |
| 24 | DF | (Thailand) Wanchai Jarunongkran | 0 | 0 | 0 | 1 | 0 | 0 | 1 | 0 | 0 | 0 | 0 | 0 | 2 | 0 | 0 |
| 27 | MF | (Thailand) Anon Amornlerdsak | 5 | 0 | 0 | 0 | 0 | 0 | 0 | 0 | 0 | 0 | 0 | 0 | 5 | 0 | 0 |
| 28 | MF | (Thailand) Thossawat Limwannasathian | 4 | 0 | 0 | 3 | 0 | 0 | 1 | 0 | 0 | 0 | 0 | 0 | 8 | 0 | 0 |
| 29 | MF | (Thailand) Sanrawat Dechmitr | 3 | 0 | 2 | 0 | 0 | 0 | 0 | 0 | 0 | 0 | 0 | 0 | 3 | 0 | 2 |
| 30 | FW | (Brazil) Robson | 0 | 0 | 0 | 1 | 0 | 0 | 1 | 0 | 0 | 0 | 0 | 0 | 2 | 0 | 0 |
| 31 | DF | (Thailand) Peerapat Notchaiya | 5 | 0 | 0 | 1 | 0 | 0 | 0 | 0 | 0 | 0 | 0 | 0 | 6 | 0 | 0 |
| 34 | GK | (Thailand) Warut Mekmusik | 1 | 0 | 0 | 0 | 0 | 0 | 0 | 0 | 0 | 0 | 0 | 0 | 1 | 0 | 0 |
| 37 | DF | (Thailand) Wisarut Imura | 5 | 0 | 0 | 2 | 0 | 0 | 0 | 0 | 0 | 0 | 0 | 0 | 7 | 0 | 0 |
| 48 | MF | (Thailand) Chayathorn Tapsuvanavon | 1 | 0 | 0 | 1 | 0 | 0 | 0 | 0 | 0 | 0 | 0 | 0 | 2 | 0 | 0 |
| 97 | FW | (Thailand) Guntapon Keereeleang | 0 | 0 | 0 | 0 | 0 | 0 | 1 | 0 | 0 | 0 | 0 | 0 | 1 | 0 | 0 |
| Total | | | 66 | 2 | 3 | 17 | 0 | 0 | 7 | 0 | 0 | 3 | 0 | 0 | 93 | 2 | 3 |

== Awards ==
=== Monthly awards ===
| Month | Coach of the Month | | Reference |
| Month | Coach | Club | Reference |
|---|---|---|---|
| June | (Brazil) Alexandré Pölking | Bangkok United | |
