= Dyer =

Dyer often refers to:

- Dyer (occupation), a person who is involved in dyeing

Dyer may also refer to:

== Places ==
=== Antarctica ===
- Dyer Plateau, a plateau in Palmer Land
- Dyer Point, in Ellsworth Land

=== United States ===
- Dyer, Arkansas, a town
- Dyer, Indiana, a town
  - Dyer (Amtrak station)
- Dyer, Kentucky, an unincorporated community in Breckinridge County, Kentucky
- Dyer Bay, a bay in Steuben, Maine
- Dyer River, a river in Maine
- Dyer, Nevada, a town
- Dyer Avenue, a street in Manhattan, New York
- Dyer State Wayside, a rest stop in Oregon
- Dyer, Tennessee, a city
- Dyer County, Tennessee, a county
- Camp Dyer, Rhode Island, a temporary camp used during the Spanish–American War
- Dyer, West Virginia, an unincorporated community

=== Elsewhere ===
- Dyer Island (disambiguation), several islands

== People ==
- Dyer (surname)
- Dyer Ball (1796–1866), American missionary and doctor in China
- Dyer Lum (1839–1893), American anarchist labor activist and poet
- Dyer Pearl (1857–1930), American businessman

== Other uses ==
- 78434 Dyer, an asteroid
- USS Dyer (DD-84), a United States Navy destroyer
- Dyer Observatory, an astronomical observatory in Brentwood, Tennessee, owned and operated by Vanderbilt University
- Dyer baronets, two baronetcies in the Baronetage of England
- DYER-TV, a Philippine television station

== See also ==
- Dier (disambiguation)
- Dyre (disambiguation)
- Dyersburg, Tennessee, a city
- Dyersburg (disambiguation)
- Dyer's Case, an old English contract law case
- Justice Dyer (disambiguation)
- Krasilnikov (disambiguation), a surname meaning dyer in Russian
