= 2022–23 Bangkok United F.C. season =

Bangkok United F.C.
2022–23 season
- Chairman: (Thailand) Kajorn Chearavanont
- Manager: (Australia) Aurelio Vidmar (until 28 December) (Thailand) Totchtawan Sripan (from 28 December)
- Stadium: Thammasat Stadium, Khlong Luang, Pathum Thani, Thailand
- Thai League: 2nd
- FA Cup: Runners-up
- League Cup: Quarter-finals
- Top goalscorer: League: Willen Mota (12); All: Willen Mota (18)

The 2022–23 season is Bangkok United Football Club's 14th in the new era since they took over from Bangkok University Football Club in 2009. It is the 7th season in the Thai League and the club's 12th (9th consecutive) season in the top flight of the Thai football league system since returning in the 2013 season.

== Squad ==
As of 11 August 2022.

Squad No.	Name	Nationality	Position(s)	Date of birth (age)	Last club
Goalkeepers
1	Michael Falkesgaard	(Philippines) (Denmark)	GK	9 April 1991 (age 34)	(Denmark) FC Midtjylland
25	Patiwat Khammai	(Thailand)	GK	24 December 1994 (age 31)	(Thailand) Samut Prakan City F.C.
34	Warut Mekmusik	(Thailand)	GK	21 February 1992 (age 33)	(Thailand) Air Force United F.C.
Defenders
2	Peerapat Notchaiya	(Thailand)	LB / LWB	4 February 1993 (age 32)	(Thailand) Muangthong United F.C.
3	Everton Gonçalves (C)	(Brazil)	CB	5 February 1990 (age 35)	(Thailand) Chiangrai United F.C.
4	Manuel Bihr	(Thailand) (Germany)	CB	17 August 1993 (age 32)	(Germany) Stuttgarter Kickers
5	Putthinan Wannasri	(Thailand)	CB / RB / LB	5 September 1992 (age 33)	(Thailand) Suphanburi F.C.
13	Nitipong Selanon	(Thailand)	RB	25 May 1993 (age 32)	(Thailand) Chiangrai United F.C.
16	Mika Chunuonsee	(Thailand) (Wales)	CB / RB	26 March 1989 (age 36)	(Thailand) Suphanburi F.C.
19	Tristan Do	(Thailand) (France)	RB / RW	31 January 1993 (age 33)	(Thailand) Muangthong United F.C.
24	Wanchai Jarunongkran	(Thailand)	LB	18 December 1996 (age 29)	(Thailand) Police Tero F.C.
26	Suphan Thongsong	(Thailand)	CB	26 August 1994 (age 31)	(Thailand) Suphanburi F.C.
Midfielders
7	Anon Amornlerdsak	(Thailand)	RW / LW / AM	6 November 1997 (age 28)	(Thailand) Bangkok Glass F.C.
8	Wisarut Imura	(Thailand)	CM / DM	18 October 1997 (age 28)	(Thailand) Air Force United F.C.
11	Rungrath Poomchantuek	(Thailand)	RW / LW	17 May 1992 (age 33)	(Thailand) Ratchaburi Mitr Phol F.C.
17	Tassanapong Muaddarak	(Thailand)	CM / DM	12 January 1991 (age 35)	(Thailand) Nongbua Pitchaya F.C.
18	Thitiphan Puangchan	(Thailand)	CM	1 September 1993 (age 32)	(Thailand) BG Pathum United F.C.
21	Chayathorn Tapsuvanavon	(Thailand)	CM / DM	12 March 2000 (age 25)	Youth Team
28	Thossawat Limwannasathian	(Thailand)	CM / DM	17 May 1993 (age 32)	(Thailand) Muangthong United F.C.
30	Ratchanat Arunyapairot	(Thailand)	CM	22 June 1996 (age 29)	(Thailand) Suphanburi F.C.
39	Pokklaw Anan	(Thailand)	CM / AM	4 March 1991 (age 34)	(Thailand) Chonburi F.C.
90	Vander Luiz	(Brazil)	RW / LW / AM	17 April 1990 (age 35)	(Thailand) Chiangrai United F.C.
Strikers
10	Heberty Fernandes	(Brazil)	FW / SS	29 August 1988 (age 37)	(Thailand) Muangthong United F.C.
20	Chananan Pombuppha	(Thailand)	FW / SS	17 March 1992 (age 33)	(Thailand) Suphanburi F.C.
29	Willen	(Brazil)	FW / SS / LW	10 January 1992 (age 34)	(Thailand) PT Prachuap F.C.
36	Chayawat Srinawong	(Thailand)	FW / SS	12 January 1993 (age 33)	(Thailand) Samut Prakan City F.C.
93	Mahmoud Eid	(Palestine)	FW	26 June 1993 (age 29)	(Thailand) Nongbua Pitchaya F.C.
Players loaned out / left during season

== Transfer ==
=== Pre-season transfer ===
==== In ====
MAHMOUD K. M. DAHADHA KHITAM

WILLEN MOTA INACIO

Pawaris Tinres

== Competitions ==
=== Overview ===
Competition	First match	Last match	Starting round	Final position	Record							
Competition	First match	Last match	Starting round	Final position	Pld	W	D	L	GF	GA	GD	Win %
Thai League	12 August 2022	12 May 2023	Matchday 1	2nd	30	19	5	6	55	22	+33	63.33
FA Cup	2 November 2022	28 May 2023	First Round	Runners-up	6	5	0	1	14	5	+9	83.33
League Cup	16 November 2022	22 February 2023	First Round	Quarter-finals	3	2	0	1	5	3	+2	66.67
Total					39	26	5	8	74	30	+44	66.67

Last updated: 28 May 2023
Source: Competitions

=== Thai League ===
==== League table ====
Pos	Team	Pld	W	D	L	GF	GA	GD	Pts	Qualification
1	Buriram United (Note: As 2021–22 Thai League 1 winners) (C, Q)	30	23	5	2	75	27	+48	74	Qualification for 2023–24 AFC Champions League group stage
2	Bangkok United (Q)	30	19	5	6	55	22	+33	62	Qualification for 2023–24 AFC Champions League group stage
3	Port (Q)	30	14	10	6	52	38	+14	52	Qualification for 2023–24 AFC Champions League qualifying play-offs
4	Muangthong United	30	14	8	8	56	37	+19	50	
5	Chiangrai United	30	12	8	10	44	42	+2	44	

Updated to match(es) played on 12 May 2023. Source: Thai League
Rules for classification: 1) Points; 2) Head-to-head points; 3) Head-to-head goals difference; 4) Head-to-head goals scored; 5) Overall goals difference; 6) Overall goals scored; 7) Fair play points; 8) Play-off without extra time;).
(C) Champions; (Q) Qualified for the phase indicated

==== Results overview ====
Overall								Home						Away					
Pld	W	D	L	GF	GA	GD	Pts	W	D	L	GF	GA	GD	W	D	L	GF	GA	GD
27	17	5	5	48	19	+29	56	10	1	2	29	11	+18	7	4	3	19	8	+11

Matchday	1	2	3	4	5	6	7	8	9	10	11	12	13	14	15	16	17	18	19	20	21	22	23	24	25	26	27	28	29	30
Ground	H	A	A	H	A	H	A	H	A	H	A	H	A	H	A	H	H	A	H	A	H	A	H	A	H	A	H	A	H	A
Result	W	W	W	W	D	L	D	W	W	W	L	W	L	D	D	W	W	W	W	W	L	W	W	W	W	L	W	L	W	D
Position	2	2	1	1	1	3	4	3	3	2	2	2	3	3	4	3	2	2	2	2	2	2	2	2	2	2	2	2	2	2

A = Away; H = Home; W = Win; D = Draw; L = Loss

==== Matches ====
12 August 2022 1	True Bangkok United	2–0	Khon Kaen United	Pathum Thani
19:00 UTC+7	Thitiphan 43'; Heberty 82'	Report	Thanathip (yellow card) 46'; Rômulo (yellow card) 48'; Grommen (yellow card) 78'	Stadium: True Stadium; Attendance: 2,058; Referee: Sivakorn Pu-udom

20 August 2022 2	Nongbua Pitchaya	0–1	True Bangkok United	Nong Bua Lamphu
18:00 UTC+7	Tardeli (yellow card) 23'; Fellipe (yellow card) 87'	Report	Heberty 32'; Mahmoud (yellow card) 48'; Bihr (yellow card) 51'; Thitiphan (yellow card) 57'; Vander (yellow card) 90+3'	Stadium: Pitchaya Stadium; Attendance: 2,492; Referee: Songkran Bunmeekiart

27 August 2022 3	Lampang	0–5	True Bangkok United	Lampang
18:30 UTC+7	Wichit (yellow card) 38'; Brinner (yellow card) 60'; Wutthichai (yellow card) 90'	Report	Mahmoud 5'; Heberty 10'; Vander 58'; Peerapat (yellow card) 60'; Everton 68'; Chayawat (yellow card) 76' , (goal) 90+4'	Stadium: Lampang Province Stadium; Attendance: 3,147; Referee: Wiwat jumpaoon

3 September 2022 4	True Bangkok United	3–0	Nakhon Ratchasima	Pathum Thani
18.00 UTC+7	Mahmoud 41'; Suphan 87'; Heberty 90+4' (pen.)	Report	Nopphon (yellow card) 20'	Stadium: True Stadium; Attendance: 2,420; Referee: Warintron Sassadee

11 September 2022 5	Sukhothai	0–0	True Bangkok United	Sukhothai
18.00 UTC+7	Sarawut (yellow card) 25'; Ekkasit (yellow card) 29'; Jakkit (yellow card) 31'; Sila (yellow card) 45+2'; Arai (yellow card) 58'; Kittipun (yellow card) 90+5'	Report	Heberty (yellow card) 48'; Suphan (yellow card) 81'	Stadium: Thalay Luang Stadium; Attendance: 1,838; Referee: Torphong Somsing

19 October 2022 6	True Bangkok United	0–1	Ratchaburi	Pathum Thani
18.00 UTC+7	Mahmoud (yellow card) 31'	Report	Jirawat (yellow card) 38'; Fortes (yellow card) 50' , (goal) 81'; Supravee (yellow card) 90+4'	Stadium: True Stadium; Attendance: 2,711; Referee: Wiwat Jumpaoon

2 October 2022 7	Port	1–1	True Bangkok United	Bangkok
18.00 UTC+7	Hamilton 40' (pen.) , (yellow card) 74'; Suphanan (red card) 68'; Tanaboon (yellow card) 88'; Weidersjö (yellow card) 90+14'	Report	Mahmoud (yellow card) 8'; Vander 59' , (yellow card) 60'; Thitiphan (yellow card) 62'; Chayawat (yellow card) 78'	Stadium: PAT Stadium; Attendance: 4,199; Referee: Chaireag Ngamsom

9 October 2022 8	True Bangkok United	4–2	Chiangrai United	Pathum Thani
17.30 UTC+7	Suphan (yellow card) 8'; Rungrath 34'; Willen 59'; Heberty 67'; Thitiphan 90+3' , (yellow card) 90+5'	Report	Felipe 3'; Diego (yellow card) 40'; Sanukran 54'; Athibordee (yellow card) 87'; Victor (yellow card) 89'	Stadium: True Stadium; Attendance: 1,807; Referee: Wiwat Jumpaoon

15 October 2022 9	Chonburi	0–1	True Bangkok United	Chonburi
18.00 UTC+7	Phanuphong (yellow card) 31'; Kelić (yellow card) 90+2'	Report	Willen 21'; Thossawat (yellow card) 32'; Falkesgaard (yellow card) 45+3'; Putthinan (yellow card) 86'	Stadium: Chonburi Stadium; Attendance: 5,942; Referee: Songkran Bunmeekiart

23 October 2022 10	True Bangkok United	2–0	BG Pathum United	Pathum Thani
19.00 UTC+7	Vander 63'; Thossawat (yellow card) 65'; Mahmoud 88'	Report	Scheid (yellow card) 18'; Sarach (yellow card) 28'; Jakkapan (yellow card) 85'	Stadium: True Stadium; Attendance: 4,312; Referee: Mongkolchai Pechsri

30 October 2022 11	Buriram United	1–0	True Bangkok United	Buriram
19.00 UTC+7	Suphanat 9'; Chitipat (yellow card) 31'; Supachai (yellow card) 81'; Čaušić (yellow card) 85'	Report	Thossawat (yellow card) 42'; Everton (yellow card) 44'; Bihr (yellow card) 59'	Stadium: Chang Arena; Attendance: 22,353; Referee: Sivakorn Pu-udom

6 November 2022 12	True Bangkok United	2–0	Lamphun Warriors	Pathum Thani
18.30 UTC+7	Heberty 51'; Ratchanat 73'	Report	Thiti (yellow card) 78'	Stadium: True Stadium; Attendance: 1,307; Referee: Niwat Insa-ard

13 November 2022 13	Police Tero	1–0	True Bangkok United	Bangkok
18.00 UTC+7	Babo (yellow card) 40'; Sorawit (yellow card) 43'; Honny (yellow card) 50'; Ekkachai (yellow card) 42'; Chanukun 79'; Witthaya (yellow card) 84'	Report	Putthinan (yellow card) 47'; Tristan (yellow card) 90+6'; Vander (yellow card) 90+6'	Stadium: Boonyachinda Stadium; Attendance: 1,280; Referee: Warintron Sassadee

19 November 2022 14	True Bangkok United	1–1	PT Prachuap	Pathum Thani
18.00 UTC+7	Willen 61' (pen.); Tassanapong (yellow card) 72'	Report	Zarifović 25'; Reichelt (yellow card) 42'; Kwanchai (yellow card) 60'; Adisak (yellow card) 88'; Eakkanut (yellow card) 90+4'; Karaboué (yellow card) 90+5'	Stadium: True Stadium; Attendance: 1,311; Referee: Sarayut Jakngeon

26 November 2022 15	Muangthong United	1–1	True Bangkok United	Nonthaburi
18.00 UTC+7	Eric Johana 51'	Report	Wanchai (yellow card) 58'; Mahmoud Eid 73'	Stadium: Thunderdome Stadium; Attendance: 3,127; Referee: Sivakorn Pu-udom

21 January 2023 16	True Bangkok United	3–1	Nongbua Pitchaya	Pathum Thani
18:30 UTC+7	Mahmoud Eid 22'; Thossawat (yellow card) 56'; Heberty 68' (pen.) , 90+5'	Report	Adisorn (yellow card) 36'; Seeket (yellow card) 43'; Ui-young 90+4'	Stadium: True Stadium; Attendance: 1,144; Referee: Natee Choosuwan

28 January 2023 17	True Bangkok United	1–0	Lampang	Pathum Thani
18:00 UTC+7	Tassanapong (yellow card) 71'; Heberty 83' (pen.)	Report	Kritsana (yellow card) 44'; Ivančić (yellow card) 75'; Anisong (yellow card) 82'; Jorge (yellow card) 82'; Bamba (yellow card) 83'	Stadium: True Stadium; Attendance: 1,091; Referee: Akom Charoensuk

5 February 2023 18	Nakhon Ratchasima	0–4	True Bangkok United	Nakhon Ratchasima
17:30 UTC+7	Wasan (yellow card) 33'; Patcharapol (yellow card) 56'	Report	Thitiphan (yellow card) 35'; Heberty (yellow card) 56'; Vander 64,68' , (yellow card) 75'; Mahmoud 70'; Rungrath 90+2'	Stadium: 80th Birthday Stadium; Attendance: 2,387; Referee: Vitsavet Sangnakorn

12 February 2023 19	True Bangkok United	3–0	Sukhothai	Pathum Thani
18:00 UTC+7	Sarawut 7' (o.g.); Mahmoud 19'; Willen 71'	Report	Sarawut (red card) 60'	Stadium: True Stadium; Attendance: 1,199; Referee: Niwat Insa-ard

17 February 2023 20	Ratchaburi	0–1	True Bangkok United	Ratchaburi
19:00 UTC+7	Jirawat (red card) 25'; Kritsananon (yellow card) 59'; Jun-heong (yellow card) 72'	Report	Heberty (yellow card) 30' , (goal) 90+4' (pen.); Wanchai (yellow card) 55'; Everton (yellow card) 90+4'	Stadium: Dragon Solar Park; Attendance: 2,713; Referee: Panumas Phansamo

26 February 2023 21	True Bangkok United	1–2	Port	Pathum Thani
18:30 UTC+7	Nitipong 79'	Report	Worachit 12'; Steuble (yellow card) 28'; Putros (yellow card) 30'; Worawut (yellow card) 38'; Elias 62'; Airton (yellow card) 88'; Negueba (yellow card) 90+4'	Stadium: True Stadium; Attendance: 3,594; Referee: Torphong Somsing

4 March 2023 22	Chiangrai United	1–2	True Bangkok United	Chiang Rai
18:00 UTC+7	Shinnaphat (yellow card) 14' (yellow-red card) 70'; Felipe 19'; Tanasak (yellow card) 54'; Suriya (yellow card) 90+1'	Report	Everton 66,90+4'	Stadium: Leo Chiangrai Stadium; Attendance: 1,536; Referee: Chaireag Ngam-som

12 March 2023 23	True Bangkok United	3–1	Chonburi	Pathum Thani
18:00 UTC+7	Mahmoud 12' , (yellow card) 28'; Heberty 62'; Pokklaw 76'; Putthinan (yellow card) 82'	Report	Seul-ki (yellow card) 33'; Channarong 45+2'; Bardanca (yellow card) 88'	Stadium: True Stadium; Attendance: 2,404; Referee: Songkran Bunmeekiart

19 March 2023 24	BG Pathum United	0–1	True Bangkok United	Pathum Thani
19:00 UTC+7	Teerasil (yellow card) 36'; Santiphap (yellow card) 88'; Túñez (yellow card) 90+1'	Report	Bihr 4' , (yellow card) 56'; Falkesgaard (yellow card) 54'; Heberty (yellow card) 63'	Stadium: BG Stadium; Attendance: 5,058; Referee: Warintron Sassadee

4 April 2023 25	True Bangkok United	4–3	Buriram United	Pathum Thani
19:00 UTC+7	Ratthanakorn 35' (o.g.); Thossawat (yellow card) 45+3'; Mahmoud (yellow card) 50'; Thitiphan 66'; Willen 78,90+5' , (yellow card) 90+5'; Peerapat (yellow card) 87'; Vander (yellow card) 88'	Report	Supachai 11,33'; Theerathon (yellow card) 37'; Sasalak (yellow card) 45+4'; Čaušić 82' , (yellow card) 90+2'; Bolingi (yellow card) 90+5'	Stadium: True Stadium; Attendance: 8,794; Referee: Natee Choosuwan

9 April 2023 26	Lamphun Warriors	2–1	True Bangkok United	Chiang Mai
18:00 UTC+7	Mohammed 8'; Todsapol (yellow card) 32'; Suárez 42' (pen.), (yellow card) 72'; Nont (yellow card) 90+3'	Report	Mahmoud 13'; Suphan (yellow card) 39'	Stadium: 700th Anniversary Stadium; Attendance: 770; Referee: Noppadet Muang-ngam

23 April 2023 27	True Bangkok United	4–1	Police Tero	Pathum Thani
18:00 UTC+7	Willen 19' , 45+1,76' (pen.); Ratchanat (yellow card) 62'; Mahmoud 90+2'	Report	Ekkachai (yellow card) 1'; Lesley (yellow card) 4'; Marc Landry 83'; Chumpol (yellow card) 90+1'; Yodsak (yellow card) 90+7'	Stadium: True Stadium; Attendance: 595; Referee: Warintron Sassadee

30 April 2023 28	PT Prachuap	2–1	True Bangkok United	Prachuap Khiri Khan
19:00 UTC+7	Dae-hee (yellow card) 31'; Chakkit (yellow card) 35'; Samuel 65'; Brenner 89'	Report	Chayawat 47'	Stadium: Sam Ao Stadium; Attendance: 1,327; Referee: Chaireag Ngam-som

6 May 2023 29	True Bangkok United	2–0	Muangthong United	Pathum Thani
18.00 UTC+7	Willen 20' , 90+6' (pen.); Mahmoud (yellow card) 38'	Report		Stadium: True Stadium; Attendance: 3,683; Referee: Mongkolchai Pechsri

12 May 2023 30	Khon Kaen United	1–1	True Bangkok United	Khon Kaen
18.00 UTC+7	Alef (yellow card) 19'; Alongkorn 26'	Report	Bihr (red card) 19'; Thossawat (yellow card) 32'; Everton (yellow card) 48'; Willen 68'; Peerapat (yellow card) 80'	Stadium: Khon Kaen Provincial Administrative Organization Stadium; Attendance: 5,105; Referee: Winat Phophat

=== FA Cup ===
2 November 2022 First Round	Chiangmai	1–3	True Bangkok United	Chiang Mai
18.00 UTC+7	Piyachanok (yellow card) 19'; Tawan 24'; Ronnayod (yellow card) 45+2'	Report	Willen 5'; Ratchanat 28,78'	Stadium: Chiang Mai Municipality Stadium; Attendance: 849; Referee: Sarayut Jakngoen

30 November 2022 Second Round	Chainat Hornbill	1–4	True Bangkok United	Chai Nat
17.00 UTC+7	Patipanchai 79'	Report	Heberty 48'; Willen 51' , 90+3' (pen.); Rungrath 60'	Stadium: Khao Plong Stadium; Attendance: 602; Referee: Chaireag Ngam-Som

8 February 2023 Third Round	Phitsanulok	1–2 (a.e.t.)	True Bangkok United	Phitsanulok
18.00 UTC+7	Macena 75'; Nuttawut (yellow card) 86'; Patipat (yellow card) 105'	Report	Wanchai (yellow card) 45+2' (yellow-red card) 63'; Bihr 56'; Thossawat (yellow card) 90+2'; Vander 116'	Stadium: Phitsanulok PAO. Stadium; Attendance: 916; Referee: Natee Choosuwan

1 March 2023 Quarter-finals	True Bangkok United	1–0	Nakhon Ratchasima	Pathum Thani
17.30 UTC+7	Wasan 68' (o.g.)	Report	Patcharapol (yellow card) 30'; Wasan (yellow card) 47'; Clough (yellow card) 54'	Stadium: True Stadium; Attendance: 1,071; Referee: Mongkolchai Pechsri

19 April 2023 Semi-finals	Police Tero	0–4	True Bangkok United	Suphan Buri
18.00 UTC+7	Honny (yellow card) 17'; Lesley (yellow card) 38'; Sorawit (yellow card) 41'; Sanchai (yellow card) 57'	Report	Thitiphan 13'; Tassanapong (yellow card) 29'; Willen 73,84'; Mahmoud 79'	Stadium: Suphan Buri Provincial Stadium; Attendance: 1,218; Referee: Songkran Bunmeekiart

28 May 2023 Final	Buriram United	2–0	True Bangkok United	Pathum Thani
18.00 UTC+7	Čaušić (yellow card) 2'; Bolingi 18,45+3' , (red card) 90+2'; Peeradon (yellow card) 68'; Pansa (yellow card) 75'; Theerathon (yellow card) 90+1'	Report	Nitipong (yellow card) 3'; Peerapat (yellow card) 82'; Thitiphan (yellow card) 90+1'; Chayawat (yellow card) 90+1'	Stadium: Thammasat Stadium; Attendance: 14,091; Referee: Wiwat Jumpaoon

=== League Cup ===
16 November 2022 First Round	Customs United	0–1	True Bangkok United	Samut Prakan
18.30 UTC+7	Thanawat (yellow card) 27'; Panomporn (yellow card) 89'	Report	Heberty 10'; Tassanapong (yellow card) 71'	Stadium: Lad Krabang 54 Stadium; Attendance: 570; Referee: Torphong Somsing

25 January 2023 Second Round	Phitsanulok	0–4	True Bangkok United	Phitsanulok
17.00 UTC+7		Report	Chayawat 20'; Rungrath 24'; Willen 40'; Wanchai 90+1'	Stadium: Phitsanulok PAO. Stadium; Attendance: 2,364; Referee: Songkran Bunmeekiart

22 February 2023 Quarter-finals	True Bangkok United	0–3	Buriram United	Pathum Thani
18.30 UTC+7	Thossawat (yellow card) 27'; Thitiphan (yellow card) 29'; Heberty (yellow card) 43'	Report	Suphanat 30'; Vučkić 50'; Čaušić 77'	Stadium: True Stadium; Attendance: 6,973; Referee: Noppadech Muangngam

== Statistics ==
=== Appearances and goals ===
No.	Pos	Nat	Player	Total		Thai League		FA Cup		League Cup	
No.	Pos	Nat	Player	Apps	Goals	Apps	Goals	Apps	Goals	Apps	Goals
1	GK	(Philippines) PHI	Michael Falkesgaard	33	0	29	0	3	0	1	0
2	DF	(Thailand) THA	Peerapat Notchaiya	31	1	22+4	0	2+2	1	0+1	0
3	DF	(Brazil) BRA	Everton Gonçalves	30	3	25	3	3	0	2	0
4	DF	(Thailand) THA	Manuel Bihr	26	2	19+1	1	4	1	2	0
5	DF	(Thailand) THA	Putthinan Wannasri	21	0	8+9	0	3	0	0+1	0
8	MF	(Thailand) THA	Wisarut Imura	3	0	0+2	0	0+1	0	0	0
10	FW	(Brazil) BRA	Heberty	32	13	25+1	11	2+2	1	2	1
11	MF	(Thailand) THA	Rungrath Poomchantuek	34	4	5+20	2	4+2	1	2+1	1
13	DF	(Thailand) THA	Nitipong Selanon	24	1	13+2	1	5+1	0	3	0
17	MF	(Thailand) THA	Tassanapong Muaddarak	30	0	5+18	0	3+2	0	2	0
18	MF	(Thailand) THA	Thitiphan Puangchan	34	4	26+2	3	4+1	1	1	0
20	FW	(Thailand) THA	Chananan Pombuppha	2	0	0+2	0	0	0	0	0
21	MF	(Thailand) THA	Chayathorn Tapsuvanavon	9	0	0+4	0	1+1	0	2+1	0
22	FW	(Thailand) THA	Guntapon Keereeleang	0	0	0	0	0	0	0	0
24	DF	(Thailand) THA	Wanchai Jarunongkran	26	1	10+8	0	4+1	0	3	1
26	DF	(Thailand) THA	Suphan Thongsong	21	1	9+8	1	1+1	0	2	0
28	MF	(Thailand) THA	Thossawat Limwannasathian	32	0	25+1	0	3+2	0	1	0
29	FW	(Brazil) BRA	Willen Mota	20	18	13	12	6	5	1	1
30	MF	(Thailand) THA	Ratchanat Arunyapairot	21	3	3+11	1	3+1	2	1+2	0
34	GK	(Thailand) THA	Warut Mekmusik	6	0	1+1	0	3	0	1	0
35	MF	(Thailand) THA	Pasakorn Biawtungnoi	2	0	0	0	0+2	0	0	0
36	FW	(Thailand) THA	Chayawat Srinawong	26	3	9+10	2	1+3	0	1+2	1
39	MF	(Thailand) THA	Pokklaw Anan	30	1	16+7	1	3+2	0	2	0
51	DF	(Thailand) THA	Kritsada Nontharat	1	0	0	0	0	0	0+1	0
90	MF	(Brazil) BRA	Vander	33	6	28	5	3+1	1	1	0
93	FW	(Palestine) PLE	Mahmoud Eid	30	11	25+1	10	2	1	1+1	0
Players transferred/loaned out during the season
19	DF	(Thailand) THA	Tristan Do	17	0	15	0	0+1	0	0+1	0
25	GK	(Thailand) THA	Patiwat Khammai	1	0	0	0	0	0	1	0
16	DF	(Thailand) THA	Mika Chunuonsee	1	0	0	0	1	0	0	0
7	MF	(Thailand) THA	Anon Amornlerdsak	0	0	0	0	0	0	0	0

Last updated: 30 November 2022
Source: Competitions

=== Top scorers ===
As of 28 May 2023

Rank	No.	Pos.	Nat.	Player	Thai League	FA Cup	League Cup	Total
1	29	FW	(Brazil)	Willen Mota	12	5	1	18
2	10	FW	(Brazil)	Heberty	11	1	1	13
3	93	MF	(Palestine)	Mahmoud Eid	10	1	-	11
4	90	FW	(Brazil)	Vander Luiz	5	1	-	6
5	11	MF	(Thailand)	Rungrath Poomchantuek	2	1	1	4
5	18	MF	(Thailand)	Thitiphan Puangchan	3	1	-	4
6	30	MF	(Thailand)	Ratchanat Arunyapairot	1	2	-	3
6	3	DF	(Brazil)	Everton Gonçalves	3	-	-	3
6	36	FW	(Thailand)	Chayawat Srinawong	2	-	1	3
7	4	DF	(Thailand)	Manuel Bihr	1	1	-	2
8	26	DF	(Thailand)	Suphan Thongsong	1	-	-	1
8	24	DF	(Thailand)	Wanchai Jarunongkran	-	-	1	1
8	13	DF	(Thailand)	Nitipong Selanon	1	-	-	1
8	39	MF	(Thailand)	Pokklaw Anan	1	-	-	1
Own goals					2	1	-	3
Totals					55	14	5	74

=== Clean sheets ===
As of 28 May 2023

Rank	No.	Pos.	Nat.	Player	Thai League	FA Cup	League Cup	Total
1	1	GK	(Philippines)	Michael Falkesgaard	14	2	-	16
2	25	GK	(Thailand)	Patiwat Khammai	-	-	1	1
2	34	GK	(Thailand)	Warut Mekmusik	-	-	1	1
Totals					13	2	2	17

=== Disciplinary record ===
As of match played 28 May 2023

No.	Pos.	Player	Thai League			FA Cup			League Cup			Total		
No.	Pos.	Player	Booked	(yellow card) (yellow-red card)	Sent off (straight red)	Booked	(yellow card) (yellow-red card)	Sent off (straight red)	Booked	(yellow card) (yellow-red card)	Sent off (straight red)	Booked	(yellow card) (yellow-red card)	Sent off (straight red)
1	GK	(Philippines) Michael Falkesgaard	2	0	0	0	0	0	0	0	0	2	0	0
2	DF	(Thailand) Peerapat Notchaiya	3	0	0	1	0	0	0	0	0	4	0	0
3	DF	(Brazil) Everton Gonçalves	3	0	0	0	0	0	0	0	0	3	0	0
4	DF	(Thailand) Manuel Bihr	3	0	1	0	0	0	0	0	0	3	0	0
5	DF	(Thailand) Putthinan Wannasri	3	0	0	0	0	0	0	0	0	3	0	0
10	FW	(Brazil) Heberty	4	0	0	0	0	0	1	0	0	5	0	0
13	DF	(Thailand) Nitipong Selanon	0	0	0	1	0	0	0	0	0	1	0	0
17	MF	(Thailand) Tassanapong Muaddarak	2	0	0	1	0	0	1	0	0	4	0	0
18	MF	(Thailand) Thitiphan Puangchan	4	0	0	1	0	0	1	0	0	6	0	0
19	DF	(Thailand) Tristan Do	1	0	0	0	0	0	0	0	0	1	0	0
24	DF	(Thailand) Wanchai Jarunongkran	2	0	0	2	1	0	0	0	0	3	1	0
26	DF	(Thailand) Suphan Thongsong	3	0	0	0	0	0	0	0	0	3	0	0
28	MF	(Thailand) Thossawat Limwannasathian	6	0	0	1	0	0	1	0	0	8	0	0
29	FW	(Brazil) Willen Mota	1	0	0	0	0	0	0	0	0	1	0	0
30	MF	(Thailand) Ratchanat Arunyapairot	1	0	0	0	0	0	0	0	0	1	0	0
36	FW	(Thailand) Chayawat Srinawong	2	0	0	1	0	0	0	0	0	3	0	0
90	MF	(Brazil) Vander	5	0	0	0	0	0	0	0	0	5	0	0
93	FW	(Palestine) Mahmoud Eid	6	0	0	0	0	0	0	0	0	6	0	0
Total			47	0	0	5	0	0	4	0	0	55	0	0
