= Michael Falkesgaard =

Filipino footballer (born 1991)

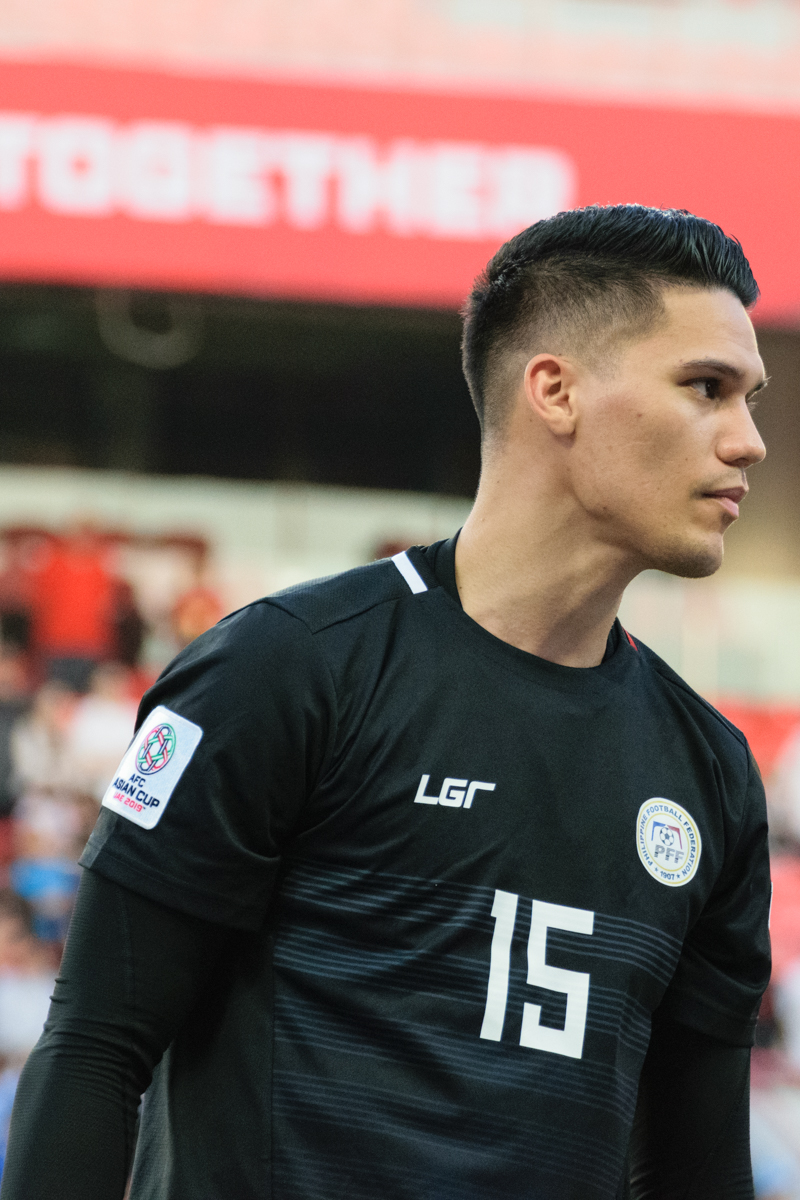
- Falkesgaard playing for Philippines at the 2019 AFC Asian Cup

Personal information
- Full name: Michael Aksel Bataican Falkesgaard
- Date of birth: 9 April 1991 (age 35)
- Place of birth: Kastrup, Denmark
- Height: 1.91 m (6 ft 3 in)
- Position: Goalkeeper

Team information
- Current team: Port
- Number: 93

Youth career
- Kastrup
- –2010: Brøndby

Senior career*
Years	Team	Apps	(Gls)
2010–2015	Brøndby	8	(0)
2015–2017	OB	11	(0)
2017–2018	Midtjylland	0	(0)
2018–2023	Bangkok United	139	(0)
2023–2025	B.93	42	(0)
2025–	Port	32	(0)

International career^{‡}
2009	Denmark U18	1	(0)
2009	Denmark U19	1	(0)
2010–2012	Denmark U20	4	(0)
2018–	Philippines	15	(0)
- * Club domestic league appearances and goals as of 4 October 2026 ‡ National team caps and goals as of 4 October 2026

Michael Aksel Bataican Falkesgaard (born 9 April 1991) is a professional footballer who plays as a goalkeeper for Thai League 1 club Port. Born in Denmark, he plays for the Philippines national team.

== Early life ==
Falkesgaard was born in Denmark to a Danish father and a Filipino mother. He was influenced by his father and elder brother to take up football. When he was five years old, he asked his father to take him to the youth academy of the local club Kastrup BK. He stated that his football role model was fellow Danish goalkeeper Peter Schmeichel.

== Club career ==
=== Denmark ===
Falkesgaard started his senior club career with Brøndby IF in 2010. In 2015, he moved to Odense Boldklub where he was the first-choice goalkeeper. However, a few matches into the season, he suffered a serious ACL injury that required surgery. He returned from injury and later joined rival club FC Midtjylland, but he was not able to play a single match for them.

=== Bangkok United ===
In January 2018, Falkesgaard was sold by Midtjylland to Thai League 1 club Bangkok United, where he is counted as an ASEAN player. Falkesgaard kept eleven clean sheets in his first season with Bangkok United, helping his club finish as runners-up in 2018.

=== Return to Denmark ===
On 30 June 2023 it was confirmed, that Falkesgaard had returned to Denmark, signing with newly promoted Danish 1st Division club B.93.

== International career ==
=== Denmark youth ===
Falkesgaard has represented Denmark at under-18 to under-20 levels.

=== Philippines ===
Born to a Filipina mother, Falkesgaard was eligible to represent the Philippines. The Philippine Football Federation learned of his eligibility through Dennis Cagara and Jerry Lucena, both of whom are also Danish-Filipino footballers capped for the Philippines.

In March 2018, Falkesgaard received his first call up for the Philippines. He earned his first cap on 22 March in a 3–2 friendly win over Fiji. He did not concede any goal in the first half; however, Nick O'Donnell was subbed in for him at the start of the second half. On 13 October, he came on as a second-half substitute for Neil Etheridge in a 1–1 friendly draw against Oman.

Falkesgaard was named in the Philippines' 23-man squad for the 2018 AFF Championship. He started in the group matches against Timor-Leste, Thailand, and Indonesia. He then played in the first leg of the semi-finals against Vietnam, but missed the second leg due to a groin injury. Philippines lost to Vietnam on 4–2 aggregate.

Since Neil Etheridge was unavailable due to club commitments, Falkesgaard was named Philippines' first-choice goalkeeper for the 2019 AFC Asian Cup—the first time the national team has qualified for the international tournament. Philippines exited the tournament at the group stage after a winless campaign.

== Career statistics ==
=== Club ===
As of match played 12 May 2023

Appearances and goals by club, season and competition
Club	Season	League (Note: Includes Danish Superliga, Thai League 1)		Cup (Note: Includes Danish Cup, Thai FA Cup, Thai League Cup and AFC Champions League)		Total	
Club	Season	Apps	Goals	Apps	Goals	Apps	Goals
Brøndby IF	2011–12	0	0	1	0	1	0
Brøndby IF	2012–13	8	0	1	0	9	0
Brøndby IF	2013–14	0	0	1	0	1	0
Brøndby IF	2014–15	0	0	0	0	0	0
Brøndby IF	Total	8	0	3	0	11	0
Odense Boldklub	2015–16	4	0	0	0	4	0
Odense Boldklub	2016–17	7	0	0	0	7	0
Odense Boldklub	Total	11	0	0	0	11	0
Midtjylland	2017–18	0	0	0	0	0	0
Bangkok United	2018	32	0	0	0	32	0
Bangkok United	2019	28	0	6	0	34	0
Bangkok United	2020–21	27	0	3	0	30	0
Bangkok United	2021–22	21	0	1	0	22	0
Bangkok United	2022–23	29	0	1	0	30	0
Bangkok United	Total	139	0	11	0	150	0
Career total		157	0	14	0	171	0

=== International ===
As of match played 26 September 2026

Appearances and goals by national team and year
National team	Year	Apps	Goals
Philippines	2018	6	0
Philippines	2019	6	0
Philippines	2020	0	0
Philippines	2021	0	0
Philippines	2022	0	0
Philippines	2023	0	0
Philippines	2024	0	0
Philippines	2025	0	0
Philippines	2026	2	0
Total		14	0

== Honours ==
=== Midtjylland ===
- Danish Superliga: 2017–18

=== Port ===
- Thai League Cup: 2025–26
- Piala Presiden: 2025

=== Individual ===
- Thai League 1 Team of the Season: 2025–26
