= Dyre =

Dyre may refer to:

People:

- Emil Dyre (born 1984), Danish professional football midfielder
- Mette Dyre (c. 1465), Danish, Norwegian and Swedish noblewoman

Rapid transit:

- IRT Dyre Avenue Line, a New York City Subway line
- Eastchester–Dyre Avenue (IRT Dyre Avenue Line), a New York City Subway station
- Dyre Avenue Shuttle, a former New York City Subway service

== See also ==
- Dyer (disambiguation)
