= Dyer Island =

Dyer Island is the name of several islands:

- Dyer Island (Antarctica)
- Dyer Island, Bermuda
- Dyer Island (Ninjago), an episode of Ninjago
- Dyer Island (Rhode Island), United States
- Dyer Island (South Africa), near Gansbaai, South Africa
