= Judge Dyer =

Judge Dyer may refer to:

- Charles E. Dyer (1834–1905), judge of the United States District Court for the Eastern District of Wisconsin
- David Patterson Dyer (1838–1924), judge of the United States District Court for the Eastern District of Missouri
- David W. Dyer (1910–1998), judge of the United States Courts of Appeals for the Fifth and Eleventh Circuits
- John James Dyer (1809–1855), judge of the United States District Court for the District of Iowa

== See also ==
- Justice Dyer (disambiguation)
