= 2012–13 Brøndby IF season =

Brøndby
2012–13 season
- Chairman: Sten Lerche
- Head coach: Auri Skarbalius
- Stadium: Brøndby Stadium
- Danish Superliga: 9th
- Danish Cup: Semi-finals
- Top goalscorer: League: Simon Makienok (15); All: Simon Makienok (16)
- Highest home attendance: 21,186 vs Nordsjælland (16 May 2013); Superliga
- Lowest home attendance: 0 (Note: Brøndby IF was ordered to play two home matches without spectators by the Danish Football Association's (DBU) Appeals Committee due to crowd disturbances during a Danish Cup match against Copenhagen on 28 November 2012. The decision was upheld by the National Olympic Committee and Sports Confederation of Denmark's (DIF) Appeals Committee on 25 March 2013, which confirmed the sanction and a fine of DKK 150,000, although a conditional third match without spectators was revoked. The matches affected were Brøndby vs. AGF on 1 April 2013 and Brøndby vs. SønderjyskE on 14 April 2013.) vs AGF (1 April 2013); Superliga vs SønderjyskE (14 April 2013); Superliga
- Average home league attendance: 9,166
| Home colours | Away colours |

The 2012–13 season is Brøndby's 32nd consecutive season in the top flight of Danish football, 23rd consecutive season in the Danish Superliga, and 47th year in existence as a football club.

== Competitions ==
=== Danish Superliga ===
| Pos | Team | Pld | W | D | L | GF | GA | GD | Pts | Qualification or relegation |
|---|---|---|---|---|---|---|---|---|---|---|
| 7 | AGF | 33 | 11 | 8 | 14 | 50 | 49 | +1 | 41 | |
| 8 | SønderjyskE | 33 | 12 | 5 | 16 | 53 | 57 | −4 | 41 | |
| 9 | Brøndby | 33 | 9 | 12 | 12 | 39 | 45 | −6 | 39 | |
| 10 | OB | 33 | 10 | 8 | 15 | 52 | 59 | −7 | 38 | |
| 11 | Horsens (R) | 33 | 8 | 10 | 15 | 31 | 49 | −18 | 34 | Relegation to Danish 1st Division |

Source: Danish Football Association (in Danish)
Rules for classification: 1) points; 2) goal difference; 3) number of goals scored.
(R) Relegated

=== Danish Cup ===
| 29 August 2012 Second round | Nordvest | 1–2 | Brøndby | Holbæk |
| 17:30 | Koch 60'; Olsen (yellow card) 78' | Report | Makienok 39'; Rommedahl 41' | Stadium: SuRi Park; Attendance: 3,308; Referee: Lars Christoffersen |

| 26 September 2012 Third round | B.93 | 0–3 | Brøndby | Brøndbyvester |
| 16:45 | Dyre (yellow card) 37'; Heisterberg (yellow card) 83'; Høegh (yellow card) 85' | Report | Gehrt (yellow card) 31', (goal) 67'; Đumić 59'; Holst 68' | Stadium: Brøndby Stadium; Attendance: 937; Referee: Lars Christoffersen |

| 7 November 2012 Fourth round | Brøndby | 3–0 | Silkeborg | Brøndbyvester |
| 17:45 | Antipas 46'; Gehrt 71'; McGrath 89' | Report | Flinta (yellow card) 23' (yellow-red card) 55' | Stadium: Brøndby Stadium; Attendance: 2,362; Referee: Anders Poulsen |

| 28 November 2012 Quarter-finals | Brøndby | 1–0 (a.e.t.) | Copenhagen | Brøndbyvester |
| 20:30 | M. Jensen 91' | Report | | Stadium: Brøndby Stadium; Attendance: 13,652; Referee: Kenn Hansen |

=== Semi-finals ===
| 13 March 2013 Semi-finals – 1st leg | Brøndby | 1–1 | Esbjerg | Brøndbyvester |
| 18:15 | Stryger 73' (pen.) | Report | Toutouh 33' | Stadium: Brøndby Stadium; Attendance: 5,127; Referee: Jakob Kehlet |

| 18 April 2013 Semi-finals – 2nd leg | Esbjerg | 3–1 (a.e.t.) (1–4 agg.) | Brøndby | Esbjerg |
| 20:30 | Braithwaite 79', 103'; Lange 117' | Report | 22' Rommedahl | Stadium: Blue Water Arena; Attendance: 8,870; Referee: Henning Jensen |
