= Krasilnikov =

Krasilnikov (Russian: Краси́льников, feminine form: Krasilnikova Russian: Краси́льникова), from Krasil'nik, dyer – one who paints the yarn and fabric, is a Russian surname. Notable people with the surname include:

- Dmitry Anatolyevich Krasilnikov (born 1979), Russian football player
- Dmitry Krasilnikov (manager), manager for FC Puuma Tallinn
- Evgeni Vitalyevich Krasilnikov (1965–2014), Russian former volleyball player
- Igor Krasilnikov (born 1952), composer for viola
- Ivan Nikolayevich Krasilnikov, ataman of a troop of Cossacks who arrested the Socialist-Revolutionary Directory leader and members in 1918 during the left-wing uprisings against the Bolsheviks
- Ksenia Krasilnikova (born 1991), Russian pair skater
- Nikolai Krasilnikov (architect), architect active with the OSA Group
- Nikolay Nikolayevich Krasilnikov (1927–2020), Russian scientist and educator in the fields of image transmission, image compression and human visual system
- Nikolai Aleksandrovich Krasilnikov (1896–1973), Russian microbiologist and soil scientist
- Olga Krasilnikova, wartime crossdresser
- Viacheslav Borisovich Krasilnikov (born 1991), Russian beach volleyball player
