= Nelson Bonilla =

Salvadoran footballer (born 1990)

Personal information
- Full name: Nelson Wilfredo Bonilla Sánchez
- Date of birth: 11 September 1990 (age 36)
- Place of birth: San Salvador, El Salvador
- Height: 1.79 m (5 ft 10 in)
- Position: Forward

Team information
- Current team: FAS
- Number: 9

Youth career
- –2009: Nejapa

Senior career*
Years	Team	Apps	(Gls)
2009–2014	Alianza	77	(20)
2014–2015	Viitorul Constanța	25	(7)
2015–2016	Zira	29	(14)
2016–2017	Nacional	14	(2)
2017	→ Gaziantep BB (Loan)	3	(0)
2017	Oliveirense	6	(2)
2018	Sukhothai	33	(25)
2019–2021	Bangkok United	20	(16)
2020–2021	→ Port (loan)	20	(6)
2021–2022	Port	21	(6)
2022–2023	Alianza	12	(2)
2023	Chiangrai United	12	(4)
2023–2024	Sukhothai	25	(8)
2024–2025	Terengganu	19	(4)
2025–	FAS	11	(1)

International career^{‡}
2012–	El Salvador	65	(20)
- * Club domestic league appearances and goals as of 10 February 2025 (UTC) ‡ National team caps and goals as of 22:00, 9 June 2024 (UTC)

Nelson Wilfredo Bonilla Sánchez (born 11 September 1990) is a Salvadoran professional footballer who plays as a forward for Salvadoran Primera Division club FAS and captains the El Salvador national team.

== Club career ==
=== Alianza ===
Bonilla scored his first goal for Alianza against Atlético Marte on 13 August 2011. He scored both goals against Águila on 11 September 2011, the match ended 2–1 to Alianza. He scored the only goal against Juventud Independiente on 2 November 2011. On 27 November 2011, he scored a 54th-minute equaliser against Firpo in a match that ended 1–1. On 22 January, he scored the winning goal against Juventud Independiente in the 60th minute, the match ended 2–1. On 5 February 2012, he scored the first goal in a 3–1 defeat against Águila.

=== Viitorul ===
In July 2014, Bonilla signed with Romanian club Viitorul Constanța.

=== Zira ===
On 31 August 2015, Bonilla signed a two-year contract with Zira FK of the Azerbaijan Premier League. On 23 May 2016, Zira announced that Bonilla had extended his contract with the club for an additional season.

=== Nacional ===
On 16 June 2016, it was announced that Bonilla would leave Zira to join Portuguese club Nacional.

=== Terengganu FC ===
In August 2024, it was announced the Bonilla had agreed to sign contract with Terengganu FC.

== International career ==
Bonilla made his debut for El Salvador on 23 May 2012 in a 2–2 away draw against New Zealand. Bonilla scored his first goal for El Salvador on 27 May 2012 against Moldova, with his team going on to win 2–0.

== Career statistics ==
=== Club ===
As of match played 12 May 2023

Appearances and goals by club, season and competition
Club	Season	League			National cup		League cup		Continental		Total	
Club	Season	Division	Apps	Goals	Apps	Goals	Apps	Goals	Apps	Goals	Apps	Goals
Alianza	2011–12	Salvadoran Primera División	29	7	—		—		—		29	7
Alianza	2012–13	Salvadoran Primera División	25	9	—		—		—		25	9
Alianza	2013–14	Salvadoran Primera División	23	4	—		—		—		23	4
Alianza	Total		77	20	—		—		—		77	20
Viitorul Constanța	2014–15	Liga I	25	7	0	0	—		—		25	7
Zira	2015–16	Azerbaijan Premier League	29	14	2	3	—		—		31	17
Nacional	2016–17	Primeira Liga	14	2	1	0	1	0	—		16	2
Gaziantep B.B.	2016–17	TFF First League	3	0	0	0	—		—		3	0
Sukhothai	2018	Thai League 1	32	25	0	0	1	2	—		33	27
Bangkok United	2019	Thai League 1	20	16	1	1	1	0	1	0	23	17
Port (loan)	2020–21	Thai League 1	20	6	3	3	—		—		23	9
Port	2021–22	Thai League 1	21	6	1	1	1	0	1	0	24	7
Alianza	2022–23	Salvadoran Primera División	7	2	—		—		0	0	7	2
Chiangrai United	2022–23	Thai League 1	12	4	2	0	—		—		14	4
Terengganu	2024-25	Malaysia Super League	12	3	6	1	0	–		0	18	4
Career total			260	102	10	7	4	2	2	0	276	111

=== International ===
As of match played 9 June 2024

Appearances and goals by national team and year
National team	Year	Apps	Goals
El Salvador	2012	7	2
El Salvador	2013	4	1
El Salvador	2014	2	1
El Salvador	2015	10	3
El Salvador	2016	6	3
El Salvador	2017	9	2
El Salvador	2018	1	1
El Salvador	2019	6	3
El Salvador	2021	4	0
El Salvador	2022	8	3
El Salvador	2024	5	1
Total		62	20

Scores and results list El Salvador's goal tally first, score column indicates score after each Bonilla goal.

List of international goals scored by Nelson Bonilla
No.	Date	Venue	Opponent	Score	Result	Competition
1	26 May 2012	Cotton Bowl, Dallas, United States	Moldova	1–0	2–0	Friendly
2	11 August 2012	StubHub Center, Carson, United States	Guatemala	1–0	1–0	Friendly
3	27 January 2013	Estadio Nacional de Costa Rica, San José, Costa Rica	Belize	1–0	1–0	2013 Copa Centroamericana
4	18 November 2014	Dennis Martínez National Stadium, Managua, Nicaragua	Nicaragua	2–0	2–0	Friendly
5	11 June 2015	Warner Park Sporting Complex, Basseterre, Saint Kitts and Nevis	Saint Kitts and Nevis	2–2	2–2	2018 FIFA World Cup qualification
6	16 June 2015	Estadio Cuscatlán, San Salvador, El Salvador	Saint Kitts and Nevis	2–0	4–1	2018 FIFA World Cup qualification
7	16 June 2015	Estadio Cuscatlán, San Salvador, El Salvador	Saint Kitts and Nevis	4–1	4–1	2018 FIFA World Cup qualification
8	25 March 2016	Estadio Cuscatlán, San Salvador, El Salvador	Honduras	2–2	2–2	2018 FIFA World Cup qualification
9	28 May 2016	RFK Stadium, Washington, D.C., United States	Peru	1–2	1–3	Friendly
10	6 September 2016	BC Place, Vancouver, Canada	Canada	1–2	1–3	2018 FIFA World Cup qualification
11	9 July 2017	Qualcomm Stadium, San Diego, United States	Mexico	1–1	1–3	2017 CONCACAF Gold Cup
12	16 July 2017	Alamodome, San Antonio, United States	Jamaica	1–0	1–1	2017 CONCACAF Gold Cup
13	13 October 2018	Estadio Cuscatlán, San Salvador, El Salvador	Barbados	1–0	3–0	2019–20 CONCACAF Nations League qualifying
14	23 March 2019	Estadio Cuscatlán, San Salvador, El Salvador	Jamaica	1–0	2–0	2019–20 CONCACAF Nations League qualifying
15	17 June 2019	Independence Park, Kingston, Jamaica	Curaçao	1–0	1–0	2019 CONCACAF Gold Cup
16	7 September 2019	Estadio Cuscatlán, San Salvador, El Salvador	Saint Lucia	3–0	3–0	2019–20 CONCACAF Nations League B
17	30 January 2022	Estadio Olímpico Metropolitano, San Pedro Sula, Honduras	Honduras	1–0	2–0	2022 FIFA World Cup qualification
18	4 June 2022	Estadio Cuscatlán, San Salvador, El Salvador	Grenada	1–0	3–1	2022–23 CONCACAF Nations League A
19	4 June 2022	Estadio Cuscatlán, San Salvador, El Salvador	Grenada	2–1	3–1	2022–23 CONCACAF Nations League A
20	9 June 2024	Dr. Ir. Franklin Essed Stadion, Paramaribo, Suriname	Saint Vincent and the Grenadines	3–1	3–1	2026 FIFA World Cup qualification
