= Dyersburg (disambiguation) =

Dyersburg is a city in Tennessee.

Dyersburg may also refer to:

- Dyersburg Army Air Base, a former army base
- Dyersburg Deers, a minor league baseball team
- Dyersburg Regional Airport, a city-owned public use airport
- Dyersburg State Community College, a community college in Dyersburg
- Dyersburg, TN Micropolitan Statistical Area, congruous with Dyer County

== See also ==
- Dyer (disambiguation)
