= Olga Krasilnikova =

Russian female cross-dresser

Olga Krasilnikova Russian: Ольга Красильникова (also Anna Alekseevna Krasilnikova) was a Russian woman who disguised herself as a man to fight in World War I. In 1914, she participated in nineteen battles in Poland, before being returned to Moscow because of a leg wound. She was decorated with the Cross of St. George.

Krasilnikova was from the area of the Ural Mountains, and her father was a miner. In 1914, at age 20, after she was denied permission to enlist, Krasilnikova disguised herself as a man, giving herself the name Anatolii Krasilnikov. She traveled to the front, eventually arriving in Poland, where she was finally able to successfully enlist, joining the 205th Infantry regiment, still disguised as a man.

She fought courageously in 19 battles during the summer and fall of 1914, until she was seriously wounded. During her final battle, on November 7, 1914, her unit was ordered to attack, yet some of her fellow soldiers hesitated due to the heavy artillery. Krasilnikova is said to have leapt from the trench and dashed onto the battlefield, which caused her comrades to follow. Very quickly she was struck in the hip, and evacuated to a field hospital, where her ruse was uncovered. For her actions she was awarded the Cross of St. George.
