= Dyer Island (Antarctica) =

Island in Antarctica

Dyer Island (67°36′S 62°52′E) is a small island between Lee Island and Entrance Island in Holme Bay, Mac. Robertson Land. Plotted from photos taken by ANARE (Australian National Antarctic Research Expeditions) aircraft in 1956. Named by Antarctic Names Committee of Australia (ANCA) after R. Dyer, cook at nearby Mawson station in 1960.

== See also ==
- List of antarctic and sub-antarctic islands
