= Dyer State Wayside =

Rest stop in Oregon

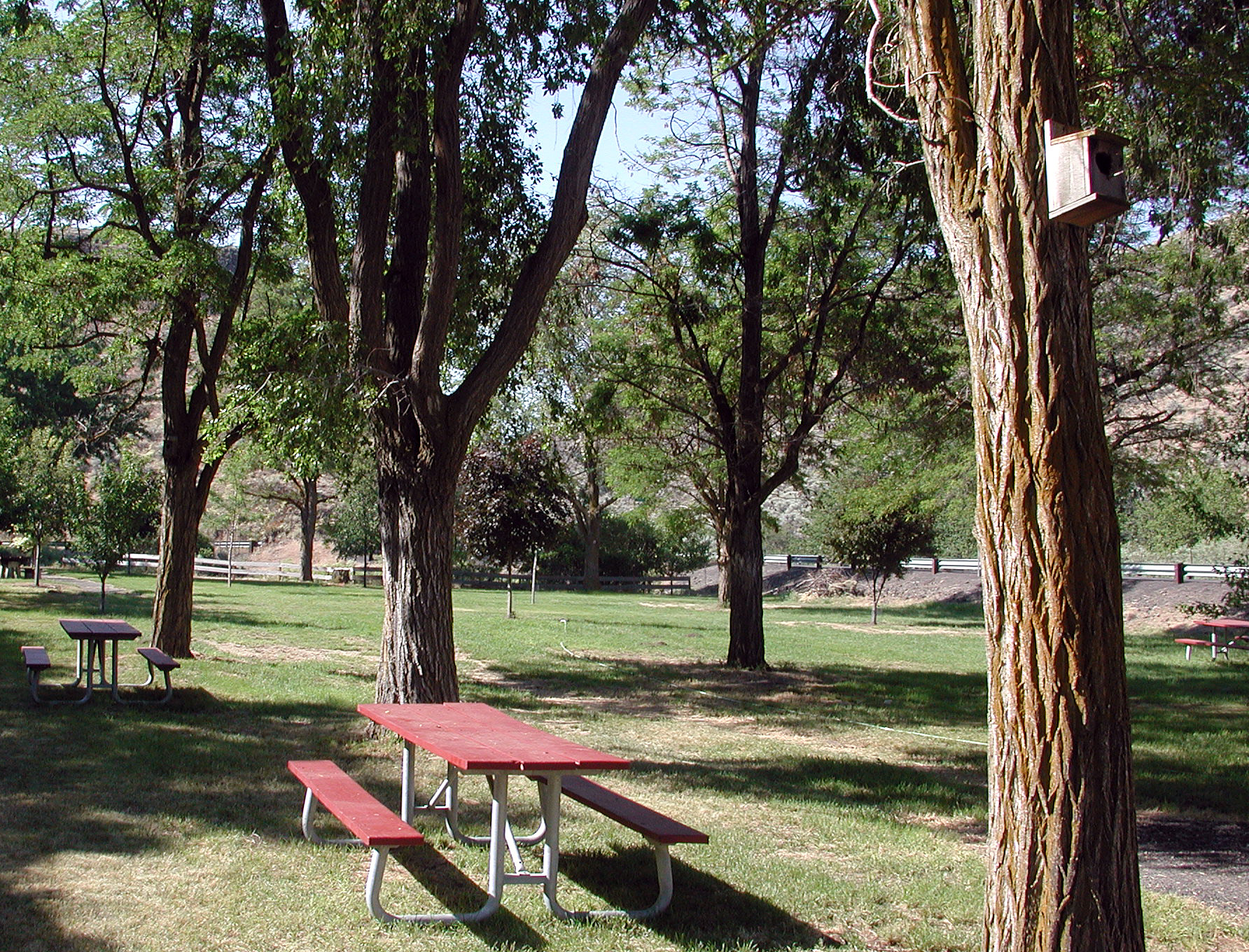

- Location within Oregon
- Location: Gilliam County, Oregon, United States
- Coordinates: 45°07′28″N 120°11′13″W
- Area: 0.6 acres (0.24 ha)
- Elevation: 2,431 ft (741 m)
- Established: 1931; renovated 1997
- Operator: Oregon Parks and Recreation Department
- Named for: J.W. Dyer, land donor

Dyer State Wayside, a rest stop with picnic tables and public toilets, lies about 10 miles (16 km) south of Condon, along Oregon Route 19. It occupies 0.6 acres (0.24 ha) in a narrow canyon along a branch of Thirty Mile Creek at the mouth of Ramsey Canyon.

== History ==
The grounds are named for J.W. Dyer, who gave the land to the state in 1931. In 1997, a group of volunteers called Dyer Partners renovated the park, which had become "an overgrown weed patch with rotting picnic tables". They trimmed locust trees, built fences, repaired picnic tables, and planted fruit trees. The federal Bureau of Land Management donated two surplus toilets in 1999 and the Oregon Parks and Recreation Department built vaults for the toilets. In 2000, OPRD installed an irrigation system and Gilliam County road crews made pathways and improved the parking lot. In 2004, the group, whose numbers were said to be "dwindling," made another stab at improving the site. With assistance from personal from Deschutes State Park, they aimed to make connections with water pipes installed two years earlier. As of 2016, the park's sole textual reference (as Dyer State Park) on the Oregon State Park's website was as a place where metal detecting can be pursued.
