= Worawut Chansitha =

Thai footballer (born 2000)

Personal information
- Full name: Worawut Chansitha
- Date of birth: 23 June 2000 (age 26)
- Place of birth: Thailand
- Position: Midfielder

Senior career*
Years	Team	Apps	(Gls)
2019–2020	Trat	1	(0)
- * Club domestic league appearances and goals

Worawut Chansitha (born July 23, 2000), is a Thai professional footballer who plays as a midfielder for Thai League 1 club Trat.
