= Alexander Sieghart =

Thai footballer (born 1994)

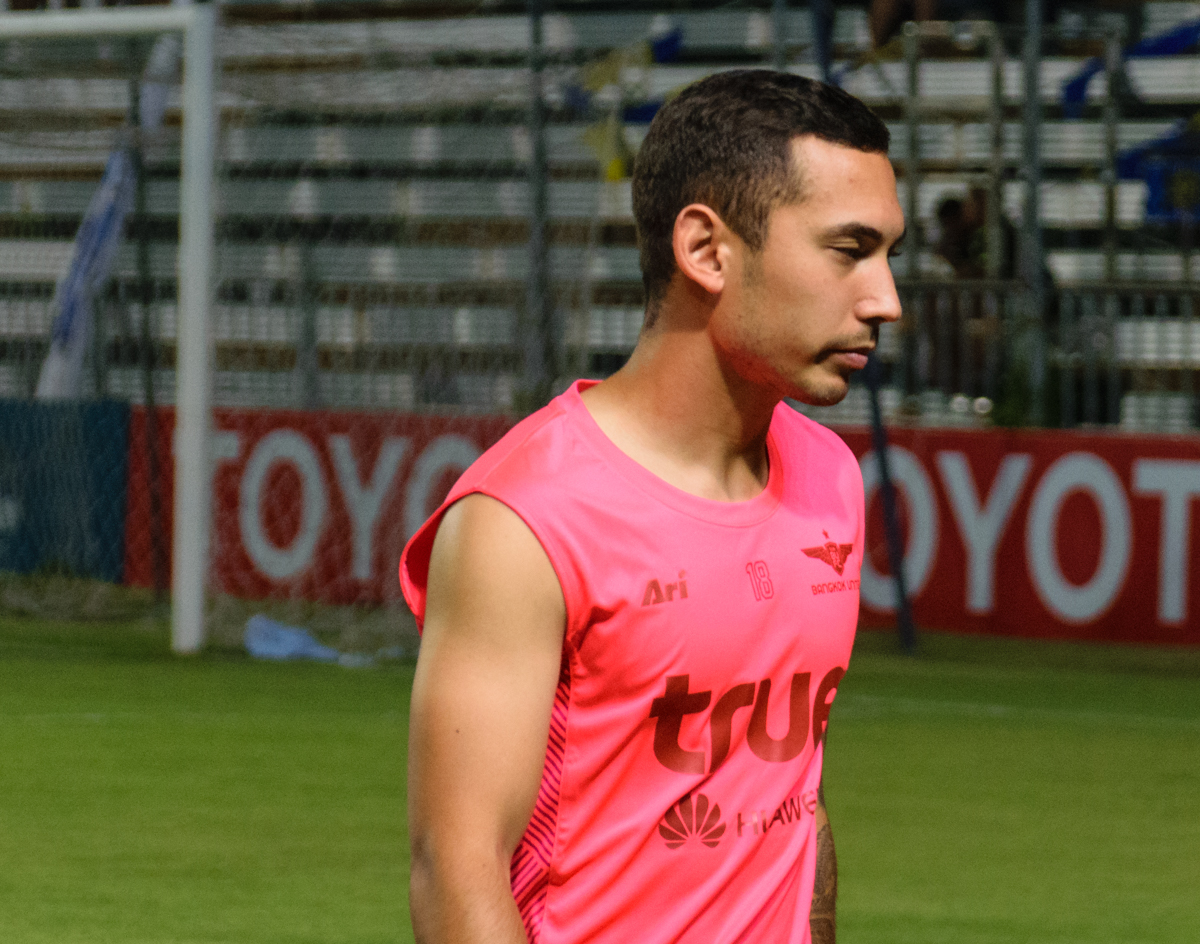

Personal information
- Full name: Alexander Kasidit Sieghart
- Date of birth: 29 July 1994 (age 32)
- Place of birth: Bangkok, Thailand
- Height: 1.73 m (5 ft 8 in)
- Positions: Midfielder; left back

Youth career
- 2009–2014: Bayern Munich

Senior career*
Years	Team	Apps	(Gls)
2012–2015	Bayern Munich II	10	(0)
2015–2016	SpVgg Unterhaching	29	(5)
2016–2017	Buriram United	12	(0)
2017–2022	Bangkok United	30	(2)
2020–2022	→ Police Tero (loan)	22	(0)
Total		103	(7)
- * Club domestic league appearances and goals

Alexander Kasidit Sieghart (Thai: อเล็กซานเดอร์ กษิดิศ ซีกฮาร์ท; born 29 July 1994) is a Thai former professional footballer who played as a midfielder or a left back.

== Early life ==
Sieghart was born in Bangkok to a German father and a Thai mother. He moved to Munich with his parents when he was 6 years old. In 2009, when he was 14, Sieghart started to train with FC Bayern Munich's youth system.

He has a younger brother, Marcel Sieghart, who was also trained by Bayern's academy.

== Career ==
=== Bayern Munich youth ===
Sieghart trained with Bayern Munich between 2009 and 2015 season. In 2012–13, he played 24 games and scored 5 goals for Bayern Munich in Under 19 Bundesliga. He also featured in Bayern Munich II in Regionalliga between 2012 and 2015 season.

In October 2012, 18-year-old Sieghart made his first two goals for Bayern Munich senior squad in the friendly match which the Bayern won 7–0 against SC Fürstenfeldbruck.

=== SpVgg Unterhaching ===
In 2015, Sieghart joined SpVgg Unterhaching in Regionalliga by the free transfer. He played 29 games in that season and helped the club to finish at the fourth place of the final standing.

=== Buriram United ===
On 14 June 2016, Sieghart announced that he would return to Thailand to play for Buriram United in the Thai League 1. Seighart wears number 23 shirt for Buriram United. He featured in the second half of 2016 Thai League.

=== Bangkok United ===
In February 2017, Sieghart moved from Buriram United to the league rivalry side, Bangkok United.

== Career statistics ==
As of 20 June 2016

Club	Season	League		Cup		League Cup		Continental		Other		Total	
Club	Season	Apps	Goals	Apps	Goals	Apps	Goals	Apps	Goals	Apps	Goals	Apps	Goals
Bayern Munich II	2012–13	1	0	0	0	—		—		—		1	0
Bayern Munich II	2013–14	2	0	0	0	—		—		—		2	0
Bayern Munich II	2014–15	7	0	0	0	—		—		—		7	0
Bayern Munich II	Total	10	0	0	0	—		—		—		10	0
SpVgg Unterhaching	2015–16	29	5	3	0	—		—		—		31	5
SpVgg Unterhaching	Total	29	5	3	0	—		—		—		31	5
Buriram United	2016	12	0	2	0	3	0	—		—		17	0
Buriram United	Total	12	0	2	0	3	0	—		—		17	0
Total		51	5	5	0	3	0	—		—		59	5

== Honours ==
Bayern Munich II

- Regionalliga: 2013-14

Buriram United

- Thai League Cup: 2016
