= Oscar Kahl =

Thai football player

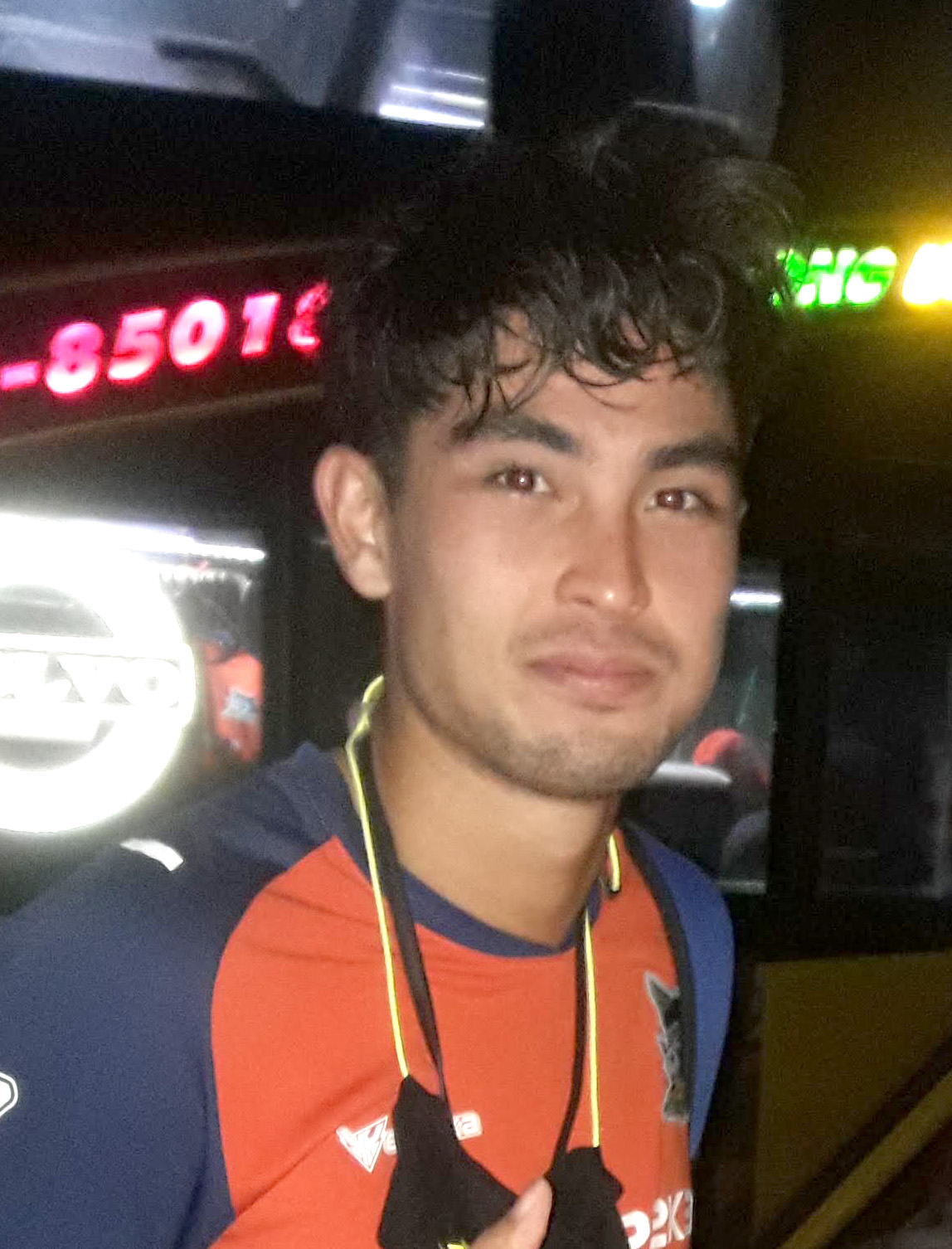

Personal information
- Full name: Oscar Andre Kahl
- Date of birth: 17 October 1997 (age 29)
- Place of birth: Solna, Stockholm, Sweden
- Height: 1.79 m (5 ft 10 in)
- Positions: Defender; midfielder

Youth career
- 2003–2017: AIK

Senior career*
Years	Team	Apps	(Gls)
2017–2019	Bangkok United	0	(0)
2018	→ Army United (loan)	6	(0)
2019	→ Air Force United (loan)	10	(0)
2020	Ranong United	3	(0)
2021	Rayong	12	(0)
2021–2022	Songkhla	10	(0)
Total		41	(0)

International career
2018	Thailand U23	1	(0)
- * Club domestic league appearances and goals

Oscar Kahl (Thai: ออสการ์ คาห์ล; born 17 October 1997) is a former footballer who plays as a defender or midfielder. Born in Sweden, he represented Thailand internationally.

== Career ==
Before the 2017 season, Kahl signed for Thai side Bangkok United after playing for the youth academy of AIK, one of the most successful clubs in Sweden.

Before the 2021 season, he signed for Thai top-flight team Rayong after playing for Ranong United in the Thai second division.

== Personal life ==
He is the brother of footballer Eric Kahl.
