= Dyer Pearl =

American businessman

Dyer Pearl (1857 - September 1930) was a prominent Wall Street businessman and a member of the New York Stock Exchange for twenty-six years. His grandfather, Dyer Pearl, founded Dyer Pearl & Company in Nashville, Tennessee before 1820.

Pearl was active on Wall Street for fifty-four years before retiring in 1928. His family was involved in stock brokerage for a century. He transferred his seat on the NYSE to his son in 1910. Pearl was a member of the New York Club, the Stock Exchange Luncheon Club, and St. Nicholas Lodge 321 A.F. & A.M. He was past master of the latter organization.

Pearl died in 1930, at the age of 73, from injuries he suffered when he was struck by a motorcycle near his home. Services were held at his residence and he was buried at Woodlawn Cemetery.
