= Weerawat Jiraphaksiri =

Thai footballer (born 1994)

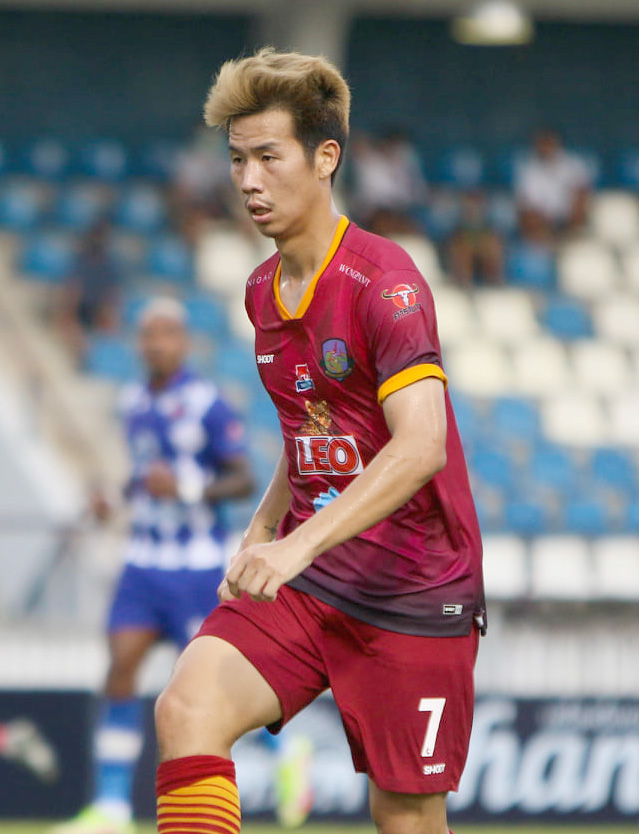

Personal information
- Date of birth: 18 May 1994 (age 32)
- Place of birth: Bangkok, Thailand
- Height: 1.80 m (5 ft 11 in)
- Position: Right back

Youth career
- 2014–2016: RSU

Senior career*
Years	Team	Apps	(Gls)
2017–2018	Air Force United		
2018	Khon Kaen United		
2018–2019	Udon Thani	16	(0)
2019–2021	→ Nakhon Ratchasima (loan)	8	(0)
2021	Kasetsart	10	(0)
2021–2022	Muang Loei United		
2022	Udon Thani	6	(1)
2023	Samutsongkhram	15	(0)
2023–2025	Nakhon Ratchasima	54	(2)
2025–2026	Police Tero	30	(3)
- * Club domestic league appearances and goals as of 9 June 2026

Weerawat Jiraphaksiri (Thai: วีรวัฒน์ จิรภัคสิริ; born May 18, 1994) is a Thai professional footballer.

== Honours ==
Nakhon Ratchasima

- Thai League 2: 2023–24
