= Justice Dyer =

Justice Dyer may refer to:

- Eliphalet Dyer (1721–1807), associate justice and chief justice of the Connecticut Supreme Court
- Ross W. Dyer (1911–1993), associate justice of the Tennessee Supreme Court

== See also ==
- Judge Dyer (disambiguation)
