= Nonthawat Klinchampasri =

Thai footballer (born 1997)

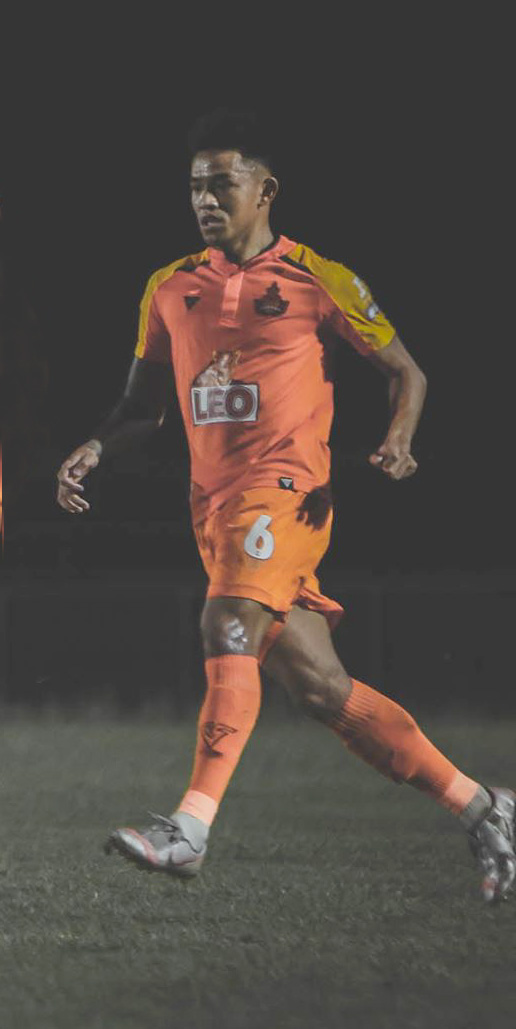
- Nonthawat playing for Udon Thani.

Personal information
- Full name: Nonthawat Klinchampasri
- Date of birth: 10 March 1997 (age 29)
- Place of birth: Bangkok, Thailand
- Height: 1.69 m (5 ft 6 1/2 in)
- Position: Midfielder

Team information
- Current team: PTU Pathum Thani
- Number: 3

Youth career
- 2012–2016: Muangthong United

Senior career*
Years	Team	Apps	(Gls)
2017–2023	Muangthong United	0	(0)
2017	→ Bangkok (loan)	10	(0)
2019	→ Nakhon Ratchasima (loan)	5	(0)
2020–2021	→ Udon Thani (loan)	18	(0)
2021–2022	→ Ayutthaya United (loan)	25	(0)
2022	→ Khon Kaen (loan)	7	(0)
2023	→ Hua Hin City (loan)	10	(0)
2023	Kasetsart	4	(0)
2024–2025	Lopburi City	23	(0)
2025–	PTU Pathum Thani	10	(0)
- * Club domestic league appearances and goals as of 27 January 2024

Nonthawat Klinchampasri (Thai: นนทวัฒน์ กลิ่นจำปาศรี, born 10 March 1997), is a Thai professional footballer who plays as a midfielder.
