= Athatcha Rahongthong =

Thai footballer (born 1997)

Personal information
- Date of birth: 11 March 1997 (age 29)
- Place of birth: Bangkok, Thailand
- Height: 1.65 m (5 ft 5 in)
- Position: Left back

Team information
- Current team: Bangkok United

Youth career
- 2015–2017: Bangkok United

Senior career*
Years	Team	Apps	(Gls)
2017–	Bangkok United	0	(0)
2018	→ Ubon United (loan)	12	(0)
2018–2019	→ Chonburi (loan)	0	(0)
2019	→ Thai Honda (loan)	3	(0)
2020–2021	→ Lampang (loan)		
- * Club domestic league appearances and goals

Athatcha Rahongthong (Thai: อธัชชา ระหงษ์ทอง, born March 11, 1997) is a Thai professional footballer who plays as a left back.
