= Emil Dyre =

Danish footballer (born 1984)

Personal information
- Full name: Emil Dyre Nielsen
- Date of birth: 9 February 1984 (age 42)
- Place of birth: Frederiksberg, Denmark
- Height: 1.79 m (5 ft 10 in)
- Position: Winger

Team information
- Current team: B.93 (assistant)

Youth career
- FB
- KB
- B.93

Senior career*
Years	Team	Apps	(Gls)
2003–2004	Fremad Amager		
2004–2005	B.93		
2006–2007	HIK		
2007–2008	Lyngby	6	(0)
2008–2014	B.93	186	(54)
2014–2017	Frem		
2017–2019	B.93	42	(8)

Managerial career
- 2020–: B.93 (assistant)
- * Club domestic league appearances and goals

Emil Dyre Nielsen (born 9 February 1984) is a Danish football coach and former player who played as a winger.

In the 2007-08 season, Dyre played nine matches for Lyngby in the top-tier Danish Superliga.

== Playing career ==
During his playing career, Dyre was a winger known for his dribbling skills and ability to reach the byline. He began his senior career at Fremad Amager before returning to his youth club B.93, where he debuted in 2004.

After brief stints at HIK and Lyngby, making nine Superliga appearances at the latter, Dyre rejoined B.93 in 2008. In 2010, he was named Player of the Season in the Danish 2nd Division East.

When B.93 was relegated in 2012, Dyre stayed with the team, helping them secure promotion the following season. He later moved to Frem in 2014 but returned to B.93 in 2017. Dyre played 251 games for B.93, ranking him eighth in the club's all-time appearances.

== Coaching career ==
On 8 June 2019 it was confirmed, that Dyre had decided to retire. In January 2020, he was hired as the assistant manager of B.93, the club where he had played 261 games for and fifth most games in the club's history.

== Honours ==
Individual

- Danish 2nd Division East Player of the Season: 2009–10
