= Thossawat Limwannasathian =

Thai footballer (born 1993)

Personal information
- Full name: Thossawat Limwannasathian
- Date of birth: 17 May 1993 (age 33)
- Place of birth: Loei, Thailand
- Height: 1.71 m (5 ft 7 in)
- Position: Midfielder

Team information
- Current team: Ratchaburi
- Number: 28

Youth career
- 2009–2010: Suankularb Wittayalai School
- 2011: Army United

Senior career*
| Years | Team | Apps | (Gls) |
| 2012–2017 | Army United | 115 | (8) |
| 2017 | → Chiangrai United (loan) | 12 | (3) |
| 2017 | → Muangthong United (loan) | 15 | (0) |
| 2018 | Muangthong United | 14 | (0) |
| 2018–2025 | Bangkok United | 158 | (8) |
| 2025– | Ratchaburi | 13 | (0) |

International career
| 2013–2016 | Thailand U23 | 9 | (1) |
| 2015– | Thailand | 7 | (0) |
Medal record
Thailand
ASEAN Championship
| Runner-up | Hyundai Cup 2026 | Team |
- * Club domestic league appearances and goals as of 9 January 2026

Thossawat Limwannasathian (Thai: ทศวรรษ ลิ้มวรรณเสถียร, born May 17, 1993) is a Thai professional footballer who plays as a midfielder for Thai League 1 club Ratchaburi and the Thailand national team.

== International career ==
In June 2015, Thossawat debuted for Thailand against Bahrain in a friendly match. In 2016 Thossawat was selected in Thailand U23 squad for 2016 AFC U-23 Championship in Qatar.

=== International ===
As of 6 June 2016

| National team | Year | Apps | Goals |
|---|---|---|---|
| Thailand | 2015 | 1 | 0 |
| Thailand | 2016 | 1 | 0 |
| Thailand | Total | 2 | 0 |

=== International goals ===
==== Under-23 ====
| # | Date | Venue | Opponent | Score | Result | Competition |
|---|---|---|---|---|---|---|
| 1. | March 22, 2015 | Bangkok, Thailand | Vietnam | 2-0 | 3-1 | Friendly Match |

== Honours ==
=== Club ===
Muangthong United

- Thai League Cup: 2017
- Mekong Club Championship (1): 2017

Bangkok United

- Thailand Champions Cup: 2023
- Thai FA Cup: 2023–24

=== International ===
Thailand

- King's Cup (1): 2016
