= 2021–22 Police Tero F.C. season =

Police Tero
2021–22 season
- Chairman: Brian L. Marcar
- Manager: Rangsan Viwatchaichok
- Stadium: Boonyachinda Stadium, Lak Si, Bangkok, Thailand
- Thai League T1: -
- Thai FA Cup: -
- Thai League Cup: -
- Top goalscorer: League: Jenphob Phokhi (5); All: Jenphob Phokhi (5)
Home colours	Away colours	Third colours

The 2021–22 season is Police Tero's 2nd consecutive seasons in top flight after promoted back from Thai League 2 in 2020. In this season, Police Tero participates in 3 competitions which consisted of the Thai League, FA Cup, and League Cup.

The season was supposed to start on 31 July 2021 and concluded on 21 May 2022. Then, due to the situation of the COVID-19 pandemic is still severe, FA Thailand decided to postpone the season to start on 13 August 2021 instead. However, as it stands on 23 July 2021, the COVID-19's situation is getting even worse. Therefore, FA Thailand decided to postpone the opening day for the second time to start on 3 September 2021.

== Squad ==
As of 4 January 2022

Squad No.	Name	Nationality
Goalkeepers
18	Akkarachai Kaoprasert	(Thailand)
22	Sinthaweechai Hathairattanakool	(Thailand)
40	Korraphat Nareechan	(Thailand)
Defenders
2	Ekkachai Sumrei	(Thailand)
4	Chalermsak Aukkee	(Thailand)
15	Chumpol Bua-ngam	(Thailand)
16	Nattaphol Sukchai	(Thailand)
19	Anuson Jaiphet	(Thailand)
24	Wanchai Jarunongkran	(Thailand)
29	Koravit Namwiset	(Thailand)
35	Isaac Honny	(Ghana)
39	Sanchai Nontasila	(Thailand)
Midfielders
5	Sitthichok Tassanai	(Thailand)
6	Alexander Sieghart	(Thailand) (Germany)
8	Kanokpon Buspakom	(Thailand)
13	Lesley Ablorh	(Ghana)
25	Anon Samakorn	(Thailand)
27	Denis Darbellay	(Thailand) (Switzerland)
30	Songkramsamut Namphueng	(Thailand)
37	Chanukun Karin	(Thailand)
Forwards
7	Nattawut Munsuwan	(Thailand)
9	Evandro Paulista	(Brazil)
10	Arthit Boodjinda	(Thailand)
14	Teeratep Winothai (Captain)	(Thailand)
17	Apdussalam Saman	(Thailand)
21	Ryo Matsumura	(Japan)
32	Yodsak Chaowana	(Thailand)
36	Veerapat Nilburapha	(Thailand)
-	Siam Yapp	(Thailand)
Players loaned out / left during season
1	Prasit Padungchok	(Thailand)
20	Yang Joon-a	(South Korea)
36	Kittipong Phuthawchueak	(Thailand)
3	Dominic Tan	(Malaysia)
11	Janepob Phokhi	(Thailand)
65	Kitiphap Uapachakam	(Thailand)

== Transfer ==
=== Pre-season transfer ===
==== In ====
Position	Player	Transferred from	Ref
FW	(Brazil) Evandro Paulista	(Thailand) Chiangmai United F.C.	Undisclosed
MF	(South Korea) Yang Joon-a	(South Korea) Incheon United FC	Undisclosed
FW	(Thailand) Jenphob Phokhi	(Thailand) Lamphun Warrior F.C.	Undisclosed
DF	(Thailand) Artit Promkun	(Thailand) Kasetsart F.C.	Undisclosed
MF	(Thailand) Songkramsamut Namphueng	(Thailand) Khlongkhon FC Academy	Undisclosed
GK	(Thailand) Kittipong Phuthawchueak	(Thailand) Sukhothai F.C.	Undisclosed
FW	(Germany) Richard Sukuta-Pasu	(South Korea) Seoul E-Land FC	Undisclosed
MF	(Thailand) Kitipop Uapachakam	(Thailand) Kasetsart F.C.	Undisclosed
GK	(Thailand) Akkarachai Kaoprasert	(Thailand) Khlongkhon FC Academy	Undisclosed
MF	(Thailand) Chanukun Karin	(Thailand) North Bangkok University F.C.	Undisclosed
MF	(Ghana) Lesley Ablorh	(Thailand) Nakhon Pathom United F.C.	Undisclosed

==== Loan In ====
Position	Player	Transferred from	Ref
FW	(Thailand) Teeratep Winothai	(Thailand) Chonburi F.C.	Season loan
MF	(Thailand) Anon Samakorn	(Thailand) Nakhon Ratchasima F.C.	Season loan
DF	(Thailand) Wanchai Jarunongkran	(Thailand) Bangkok United F.C.	Season loan
MF	(Thailand) Alexander Sieghart	(Thailand) Bangkok United F.C.	Season loan

==== Out ====
Position	Player	Transferred To	Ref
FW	(Thailand) Kirati Keawsombat	(Thailand) Uthai Thani F.C.	Undisclosed
MF	(Thailand) Narong Jansawek	(Thailand) Uthai Thani F.C.	Undisclosed
MF	(Thailand) Wannaphon Buspakom	(Thailand) Rajpracha F.C.	Undisclosed
DF	(South Korea) Kwon Dae-hee	(Thailand) Lamphun Warrior F.C.	Undisclosed
FW	(Brazil) Tiago Chulapa	(Thailand) Lamphun Warrior F.C.	Undisclosed
FW	(Thailand) Adisak Srikampang	(Thailand) Rayong F.C.	Undisclosed
MF	(Thailand) Santitorn Lattirom	(Thailand) Khon Kaen United F.C.	Undisclosed
DF	(Thailand) Chompoo Sangpo	(Thailand) Suphanburi F.C.	Undisclosed
GK	(Thailand) Kritsana Klanklin	(Thailand) Kasetsart F.C.	Undisclosed
FW	(Thailand) Jaturong Pimkoon	(Thailand) Saimit Kabin United F.C.	Undisclosed
MF	(Thailand) Thanakorn Saikomon	Unattached	Released
FW	(Germany) Richard Sukuta-Pasu	Unattached (Note: Later joined SV Meppen)	Contract terminated
FW	(Thailand) Supot Jodjam	(Thailand) Kasetsart F.C.	Undisclosed
DF	(Thailand) Artit Promkun	Unattached	Released
GK	(Thailand) Chalermkiat Sombutpan	Unattached	Released

==== Loan Out ====
Position	Player	Transferred To	Ref
GK	(Thailand) Anipong Kijkam	(Thailand) Muangkan United F.C.	Season loan
DF	(Thailand) Anuson Jaiphet	(Thailand) Udon Thani F.C.	Season loan

=== Mid-season transfer ===
==== In ====
Position	Player	Transferred from	Ref
DF	(Thailand) Koravit Namwiset	Unattached (Note: Most recently played for Muangkan United)	Free
GK	(Thailand) Sinthaweechai Hathairattanakool	Unattached (Note: Most recently played for Muangkan United)	Free
FW	(Thailand) Siam Yapp	Unattached	Free

==== Loan In ====
Position	Player	Transferred from	Ref
GK	(Thailand) Korraphat Nareechan	(Thailand) BG Pathum United F.C.	Season loan
FW	(Japan) Ryo Matsumura	(Thailand) BG Pathum United F.C.	Season loan
FW	(Thailand) Veerapat Nilburapha	(Thailand) Bangkok United F.C.	Season loan

==== Out ====
Position	Player	Transferred To	Ref
GK	(Thailand) Prasit Padungchok	(Thailand) BG Pathum United F.C.	Undisclosed
MF	(South Korea) Yang Joon-a	Unattached	Contract Terminated
GK	(Thailand) Kittipong Phuthawchueak	Unattached (Note: Later joined for BG Pathum United)	Contract Terminated
DF	(Malaysia) Dominic Tan	(Malaysia) Sabah F.C.	Undisclosed
MF	(Thailand) Kitiphap Uapachakam	(Thailand) Customs Ladkrabang United F.C.	Undisclosed
FW	(Thailand) Janepob Phokhi	(Thailand) Port F.C.	Undisclosed

==== Loan Out ====
Position	Player	Transferred To	Ref

== Competitions ==
=== Overview ===
Competition	First match	Last match	Starting round	Record							
Competition	First match	Last match	Starting round	Pld	W	D	L	GF	GA	GD	Win %
Thai League	5 September 2021	21 May 2022	Matchday 1	15	5	5	5	20	22	−2	33.33
FA Cup	27 October 2021		First Round	2	2	0	0	3	0	+3	100.00
League Cup	12 January 2022		First Round	1	1	0	0	2	1	+1	100.00
Total				18	8	5	5	25	23	+2	44.44

Last updated: 12 January 2022
Source: Competitions

=== Thai League 1 ===
==== League table ====
Pos	Team	Pld	W	D	L	GF	GA	GD	Pts
9	Nakhon Ratchasima	30	10	7	13	33	47	−14	37
10	Khonkaen United	30	10	7	13	30	43	−13	37
11	Police Tero	30	8	13	9	33	39	−6	37
12	Ratchaburi Mitr Phol	30	9	9	12	32	36	−4	36
13	PT Prachuap	30	8	7	15	30	45	−15	31

Updated to match(es) played on 4 May 2022. Source: Thai League
Rules for classification: 1) Points; 2) Head-to-head points; 3) Head-to-head goals difference; 4) Head-to-head goals scored; 5) Overall goals difference; 6) Overall goals scored; 7) Fair play points; 8) Play-off without extra time;).

==== Results summary ====
Overall								Home						Away					
Pld	W	D	L	GF	GA	GD	Pts	W	D	L	GF	GA	GD	W	D	L	GF	GA	GD
15	5	5	5	20	22	−2	20	4	2	0	10	5	+5	1	3	5	10	17	−7

==== Results by matchday ====
Matchday	1	2	3	4	5	6	7	8	9	10	11	12	13	14	15	16
Ground	A	A	A	H	A	H	A	H	A	H	A	A	H	A	H	H
Result	D	L	L	D	L	W	W	D	L	W	D	L	W	D	W	
Position	4	15	15	15	16	13	8	9	11	10	10	12	10	11	9	

A = Away; H = Home; W = Win; D = Draw; L = Loss

==== Matches ====
Win Draw Loss

5 September 2021 1	Port	3-3	Police Tero	Bangkok
	Sergio Suárez 23' 55'; Rochela 45'		Evandro 6' 24'; Honny 33'	Stadium: PAT Stadium

11 September 2021 2	Buriram United	3-1	Police Tero	Buriram
	Supachok 45+3'; Supachai 65'; Suphanat 81'		Ablorh (yellow card) 26' (yellow-red card) 31'; Ekkachai 44'	Stadium: Chang Arena; Attendance: 5,028; Referee: Sarayut Jakngoen

19 September 2021 3	Nakhon Ratchasima	1-0	Police Tero	Nakhon Ratchasima
	Pralong 22'		Wanchai (yellow card) 51' (yellow-red card) 88'	Stadium: 80th Birthday Stadium; Attendance: 0 Referee: Songkran Bunmeekiart

26 September 2021 4	Police Tero	1-1	Samut Prakan City	Bangkok
	Honny 40'		Suphanan 51'	Stadium: Boonyachinda Stadium; Attendance: 0 Referee: Natee Choosuwan

2 October 2021 5	Nongbua Pitchaya	1-0	Police Tero	Nong Bua Lamphu
	Hamilton 24'		Chalermsak (yellow card) 70' (yellow-red card) 84'	Stadium: Pitchaya Stadium; Attendance: 462; Referee: Tastarawut Khantavichai

5 October 2021 6	Police Tero	2-0	Chonburi	Bangkok
	Jenphob 10' 25'			Stadium: Boonyachinda Stadium; Attendance: 0 Referee: Paisan Bendem-alee

9 October 2021 7	BG Pathum United	0-3	Police Tero	Pathum Thani
			Wanchai 14'; Jenphob 51'; Nattaphol 88'	Stadium: Leo Stadium; Attendance: 0 Referee: Noppadet Mangngam

17 October 2021 8	Police Tero	2-2	Ratchaburi Mitr Phol	Bangkok
	Kasidech 28'; Chalermsak 54' (o.g.)		Ablorh 71'; Evandro 90+8' (pen.)	Stadium: Boonyachinda Stadium; Attendance: 0 Referee: Chaireag Ngam-som

23 October 2021 9	Muangthong United	2-1	Police Tero	Nonthaburi
	Mirzaev 41'; Poramet 78'		Adisak 3' (o.g.); Arthit (red card) 28'; Chumpol (yellow card) 45+3' (yellow-red card) 70'	Stadium: Thunderdome Stadium; Attendance: 1,845; Referee: Phairot Bunkamnoed

30 October 2021 10	Police Tero	3-2	Leo Chiangrai United	Bangkok
	Teeratep 18' 71'; Jenphob 63'		Akarawin 52'; Bill 88'	Stadium: Boonyachinda Stadium; Attendance: 1,112; Referee: Warintorn Sassadee

6 November 2021 11	Khon Kaen United	1-1	Police Tero	Khon Kaen
	Jakkit 20'		Jenphob 8'; Kanokpon (yellow card) 52' (yellow-red card) 65'	Stadium: Khon Kaen Provincial Stadium; Attendance: 1,618; Referee: Anusorn Nookaew

9 November 2021 12	True Bangkok United	5-0	Police Tero	Pathum Thani
	Wisarut 28'; Tristan 39'; Vander 54'; Thossawat 67'; Carter 90' (pen.)			Stadium: True Stadium; Attendance: 956; Referee: Songkran Bunmeekiart

13 November 2021 13	Police Tero	1-0	Suphanburi	Bangkok
	Jenphob 37'			Stadium: Boonyachinda Stadium; Attendance: 848; Referee: Winat Phophat

9 November 2021 14	PT Prachuap	1-1	Police Tero	Prachuap Khiri Khan
	Apichart 90+5'		Chanukun 5'	Stadium: Sam Ao Stadium; Attendance: 512; Referee: Natee Choosuwan

27 November 2021 15	Police Tero	1-0	Chiangmai United	Bangkok
	Honny 90+2'			Stadium: Boonyachinda Stadium; Attendance: 808; Referee: Warintorn Sassadee

Police Tero	v	Buriram United	Bangkok
			Stadium: Boonyachinda Stadium

=== Thai FA Cup ===
==== Matches ====
Win Draw Loss

27 October 2021 First Round	Chiangrai Dragon VBAC (TA)	0-2	Police Tero (T1)	Chiang Rai
	Denis 67'; Nattawut 90+1'			Stadium: Chiangrai Provincial Stadium; Attendance: 0 Referee: Panumas Phansamo

24 November 2021 Second Round	Police Tero (T1)	1-0	Khon Kaen United (T1)	Bangkok
	Teeratep 90+4'			Stadium: Boonyachinda Stadium

19 January 2022 Third Round	True Bangkok United (T1)	0-1	Police Tero (T1)	Pathum Thani
			Evandro Paulista 80'	Stadium: Thammasat Stadium

=== Thai League Cup ===
==== Matches ====
Win Draw Loss

12 January 2022 First Round	Nakhon Pathom United (T2)	1-2 (a.e.t.)	Police Tero (T1)	Nakhon Pathom
	Raungchai 41'; Sunchai (yellow card) 95' (yellow-red card) 97'; Nattanan (yellow card) 90+1' (yellow-red card) 120+4'		Honny 115'; Veerapat 120+3'	Stadium: Nakhon Pathom Municipality Sport School Stadium; Attendance: 475; Referee: Songkran Bunmeekiart

Second Round	v

== Team statistics ==
=== Appearances and goals ===
As of 12 December 2021

No.	Pos.	Player	League		FA Cup		League Cup		Total	
No.	Pos.	Player	Apps.	Goals	Apps.	Goals	Apps.	Goals	Apps.	Goals
2	DF	(Thailand) Ekkachai Sumrei	9	1	1	0	1	0	11	1
4	DF	(Thailand) Chalermsak Aukkee	15	0	2	0	1	0	18	0
5	MF	(Thailand) Sitthichok Tassanai	4+10	0	2	0	0+1	0	6+11	0
6	MF	(Thailand) Alexander Sieghart	13+1	0	0+1	0	0+1	0	13+3	0
7	FW	(Thailand) Nattawut Munsuwan	0+1	0	1+1	1	0+1	0	1+3	1
8	MF	(Thailand) Kanokpon Buspakom	4+3	0	2	0	0	0	6+3	0
9	FW	(Brazil) Evandro Paulista	7+2	3	0	0	1	0	8+2	3
10	FW	(Thailand) Arthit Boodjinda	7+5	0	1	0	0	0	8+5	0
13	MF	(Ghana) Lesley Ablorh	9	1	0	0	1	0	10	1
14	FW	(Thailand) Teeratep Winothai	9+4	2	1+1	1	1	0	11+5	3
15	DF	(Thailand) Chumpol Bua-ngam	10+1	0	0+1	0	1	0	11+2	0
16	DF	(Thailand) Nattaphol Sukchai	6+6	1	1	0	0+1	0	7+7	1
17	FW	(Thailand) Apdussalam Saman	0	0	2	0	0	0	2	0
18	GK	(Thailand) Akkarachai Kaoprasert	0	0	0	0	0	0	0	0
21	FW	(Japan) Ryo Matsumura	0	0	0	0	1	0	1	0
22	GK	(Thailand) Sinthaweechai Hathairattanakool	0	0	0	0	1	0	1	0
24	DF	(Thailand) Wanchai Jarunongkran	10+3	1	1	0	1	0	12+3	1
25	MF	(Thailand) Anon Samakorn	0	0	0	0	0	0	0	0
27	MF	(Thailand) Denis Darbellay	1+3	0	1	1	0	0	2+3	1
29	DF	(Thailand) Koravit Namwiset	0	0	0	0	0	0	0	0
30	MF	(Thailand) Songkramsamut Namphueng	0	0	0+1	0	0	0	0+1	0
32	FW	(Thailand) Yodsak Chaowana	0+9	0	2	0	0+1	0	2+10	0
35	DF	(Ghana) Isaac Honny	15	3	1+1	0	1	1	17+1	4
36	FW	(Thailand) Veerapat Nilburapha	0	0	0	0	0+1	1	0+1	1
37	MF	(Thailand) Chanukun Karin	12+3	1	0+1	0	1	0	13+4	1
39	DF	(Thailand) Sanchai Nontasila	4+6	0	1	0	0	0	5+6	0
40	GK	(Thailand) Korraphat Nareechan	0	0	0	0	0	0	0	0
Players loaned out / left during season
1	GK	(Thailand) Prasit Padungchok	8	0	1	0	0	0	9	0
20	MF	(South Korea) Yang Joon-a	3+4	0	0	0	0	0	3+4	0
36	GK	(Thailand) Kittipong Phuthawchueak	7	0	1	0	0	0	8	0
3	DF	(Malaysia) Dominic Tan	0+6	0	0	0	0	0	0+6	0
65	MF	(Thailand) Kitiphap Uapachakam	0+2	0	1	0	0	0	1+2	0
11	FW	(Thailand) Janepob Phokhi	12+3	6	0+2	0	0	0	12+5	6

== Overall summary ==
=== Season summary ===
Games played	18 (15 Thai League, 2 FA Cup, 1 League Cup)
Games won	8 (5 Thai League, 2 FA Cup, 1 League Cup)
Games drawn	5 (5 Thai League, 0 FA Cup, 0 League Cup)
Games lost	5 (5 Thai League, 0 FA Cup, 0 League Cup)
Goals scored	25 (20 Thai League, 3 FA Cup, 2 League Cup)
Goals conceded	23 (22 Thai League, 0 FA Cup, 1 League Cup)
Goal difference	+2
Clean sheets	6 (4 Thai League, 2 FA Cup, 0 League Cup)
Best result	3-0 vs BG Pathum United (9 October 21)
Worst result	0-5 vs True Bangkok United (9 November 21)
Most appearances	2 players (18)
Top scorer	Jenphob Phokhi (6)
Points	20

=== Score overview ===
Opposition	Home score	Away score	Double
BG Pathum United		0-3	
Buriram United		3-1	No
Chiangmai United	1-0		
Chonburi	2-0		
Khon Kaen United		1-1	No
Leo Chiangrai United	3-2		
Muangthong United		2-1	No
Nakhon Ratchasima		1-0	No
Nongbua Pitchaya		1-0	No
Port		0-0	No
PT Prachuap		1-1	No
Ratchaburi Mitr Phol	2-2		No
Samut Prakan City	1-1		No
Suphanburi	1-0		
True Bangkok United		5-0	No
