= 2021–22 Bangkok United F.C. season =

Bangkok United F.C.
2021–22 season
- Chairman: Kajorn Chearavanont
- Manager: Totchtawan Sripan (until 11 March); Aurelio Vidmar (from 11 March)
- Stadium: Thammasat Stadium, Khlong Luang, Pathum Thani, Thailand
- Thai League: 3rd
- FA Cup: Third Round
- League Cup: Quarter-finals
- Top goalscorer: League: Heberty Fernandes (15); All: Heberty Fernandes (17)

The 2021–22 season is Bangkok United Football Club's 13th in the new era since they took over from Bangkok University Football Club in 2009. It is the 6th season in the Thai League and the club's 11th (8th consecutive) season in the top flight of the Thai football league system since returning in the 2013 season.

In the league, the season was supposed to start on 31 July 2021 and concluded on 21 May 2022. Then, due to the situation of the COVID-19 pandemic is still severe, FA Thailand decided to postpone the season to start on 13 August 2021 instead. However, as it stands on 23 July 2021, the COVID-19's situation is getting even worse. Therefore, FA Thailand decided to postpone the opening day for the second time to start on 3 September 2021.

== Squad ==
As of 4 September 2021.

Squad No.	Name	Nationality	Position(s)	Date of birth (age)	Last club
Goalkeepers
1	Michael Falkesgaard	(Philippines) (Denmark)	GK	9 April 1991 (age 34)	(Denmark) FC Midtjylland
34	Warut Mekmusik	(Thailand)	GK	21 February 1992 (age 33)	(Thailand) Air Force United F.C.
52	Supanut Suadsong	(Thailand)	GK	25 February 1999 (age 26)	Youth Team
68	Phuwadon Phonsongkram	(Thailand)	GK	11 May 2002 (age 23)	(Thailand) Khon Kaen United F.C.
Defenders
2	Peerapat Notchaiya	(Thailand)	LB / LWB	4 February 1993 (age 33)	(Thailand) Muangthong United F.C.
3	Everton Gonçalves (C)	(Brazil)	CB	5 February 1990 (age 36)	(Thailand) Chiangrai United F.C.
4	Manuel Bihr	(Thailand) (Germany)	CB	17 August 1993 (age 32)	(Germany) Stuttgarter Kickers
5	Putthinan Wannasri	(Thailand)	CB / RB / LB	5 September 1992 (age 33)	(Thailand) Suphanburi F.C.
16	Mika Chunuonsee	(Thailand) (Wales)	CB / RB	26 March 1989 (age 36)	(Thailand) Suphanburi F.C.
19	Tristan Do	(Thailand) (France)	RB / RW	31 January 1993 (age 33)	(Thailand) Muangthong United F.C.
26	Suphan Thongsong	(Thailand)	CB	26 August 1994 (age 31)	(Thailand) Suphanburi F.C.
32	Santipap Yaemsaen	(Thailand)	CB	1 March 2000 (age 25)	Youth Team
44	Nakin Wisetchat	(Thailand)	RB	9 July 1999 (age 26)	(Thailand) Ayutthaya F.C.
81	Nattanon Jaroensingkewan	(Thailand)	CB	1 May 2000 (age 25)	Youth Team
Midfielders
7	Anon Amornlerdsak	(Thailand)	RW / LW / AM	6 November 1997 (age 28)	(Thailand) Bangkok Glass F.C.
8	Wisarut Imura	(Thailand)	CM / DM	18 October 1997 (age 28)	(Thailand) Air Force United F.C.
10	Vander Luiz	(Brazil)	RW / LW / AM	17 April 1990 (age 35)	(Thailand) Chiangrai United F.C.
15	Nanthawat Kokfai	(Thailand)	CM / DM	11 March 1995 (age 30)	(Thailand) Nakhon Pathom United F.C.
17	Rungrath Poomchantuek	(Thailand)	RW / LW	17 May 1992 (age 33)	(Thailand) Ratchaburi Mitr Phol F.C.
18	Thitiphan Puangchan	(Thailand)	CM	1 September 1993 (age 32)	(Thailand) BG Pathum United F.C.
21	Chayathorn Tapsuvanavon	(Thailand)	CM / DM	12 March 2000 (age 25)	Youth Team
23	Jedsadakorn Kowngam	(Thailand)	CM	13 March 1997 (age 28)	Youth Team
28	Thossawat Limwannasathian	(Thailand)	CM / DM	17 May 1993 (age 32)	(Thailand) Muangthong United F.C.
33	Jirayu Niamthaisong	(Thailand)	CM	20 October 1997 (age 28)	Youth Team
35	Pasakorn Biawtungnoi	(Thailand)	CM	1 April 2000 (age 25)	Youth Team
39	Pokklaw Anan	(Thailand)	CM / AM	4 March 1991 (age 34)	(Thailand) Chonburi F.C.
62	Kritsanapon Buncharee	(Thailand)	CM	26 March 2001 (age 24)	Youth Team
Strikers
11	Anthony Carter	(Australia) (Italy)	FW / SS / LW	31 August 1994 (age 31)	(Portugal) Académico de Viseu F.C.
14	Nattawut Suksum	(Thailand)	FW / SS	6 November 1997 (age 28)	Youth Team
20	Chananan Pombuppha	(Thailand)	FW / SS	17 March 1992 (age 33)	(Thailand) Suphanburi F.C.
22	Guntapon Keereeleang	(Thailand)	FW / SS	22 January 2001 (age 25)	Youth Team
37	Heberty Fernandes	(Brazil)	FW / SS	29 August 1988 (age 37)	(Thailand) Muangthong United F.C.
Players loaned out / left during season
31	Jakkit Wachpirom	(Thailand)	RB / RWB / RW	26 January 1997 (age 29)	Youth Team

== Transfer ==
=== Pre-season transfer ===
==== In ====
Position	Player	Transferred from	Ref
MF	(Thailand) Nanthawat Kokfai	(Thailand) Nakhon Pathom United F.C.	Undisclosed
FW	(Australia) Anthony Carter	(Portugal) Académico de Viseu F.C.	Undisclosed
MF	(Thailand) Thitiphan Puangchan	(Thailand) BG Pathum United F.C.	Loan (Note: Initially a loan until the end of 2021 with an agreement to sign 3 and a half years contract on a permanent deal)

==== Out ====
Position	Player	Transferred To	Ref
MF	(Thailand) Anthony Ampaipitakwong	Unattached	End of contract
FW	(Thailand) Veerapat Nilburapha	(Thailand) Khon Kaen United F.C.	Season loan
DF	(Thailand) Wanchai Jarunongkran	(Thailand) Police Tero F.C.	Season loan
DF	(Thailand) (Germany) Alexander Sieghart	(Thailand) Police Tero F.C.	Season loan
MF	(Thailand) Sanrawat Dechmitr	(Thailand) Ratchaburi Mitr Phol F.C.	Season loan
DF	(Thailand) Kritsada Nontharat	(Thailand) Suphanburi F.C.	Season loan
MF	(Thailand) Natakorn Soithong	(Thailand) Kanchanaburi F.C.	Season loan

==== Return from loan ====
Position	Player	Transferred from	Ref

=== Mid-season transfer ===
==== In ====
Position	Player	Transferred from	Ref
DF	(Thailand) Suphan Thongsong	(Thailand) Suphanburi F.C.	Free

==== Out ====
Position	Player	Transferred To	Ref
DF	(Thailand) Jakkit Wachpirom	(Thailand) Suphanburi F.C.	Undisclosed
FW	(Australia) Anthony Carter		

==== Return from loan ====
Position	Player	Transferred from	Ref

== Friendlies ==
=== Pre-season friendly ===
Win Draw Loss

== Competitions ==
=== Overview ===
Competition	First match	Last match	Starting round	Final position	Record							
Competition	First match	Last match	Starting round	Final position	Pld	W	D	L	GF	GA	GD	Win %
Thai League	4 September 2021	21 May 2022	Matchday 1		30	15	8	7	53	30	+23	50.00
FA Cup	27 October 2021	19 January 2022	First Round	Third Round	3	2	0	1	8	1	+7	66.67
League Cup	12 January 2022		First Round		3	1	1	1	3	1	+2	33.33
Total					36	18	9	9	64	32	+32	50.00

Last updated: 4 May 2022
Source: Competitions

=== Thai League ===
==== League table ====
Pos	Team	Pld	W	D	L	GF	GA	GD	Pts	Qualification
1	Buriram United (C, Q)	30	19	5	6	48	19	+29	62	Qualification for 2023–24 AFC Champions League group stage
2	BG Pathum United (Q)	30	17	9	4	52	27	+25	60	Qualification for 2023–24 AFC Champions League qualifying play-offs
3	Bangkok United	30	15	8	7	53	30	+23	53	
4	Muangthong United	30	13	10	7	46	35	+11	49	
5	Chiangrai United	30	13	8	9	33	35	−2	47	

Updated to match(es) played on 4 May 2022. Source: Thai League
Rules for classification: 1) Points; 2) Head-to-head points; 3) Head-to-head goals difference; 4) Head-to-head goals scored; 5) Overall goals difference; 6) Overall goals scored; 7) Fair play points; 8) Play-off without extra time;).
(C) Champions; (Q) Qualified for the phase indicated

==== Results overview ====
Overall								Home						Away					
Pld	W	D	L	GF	GA	GD	Pts	W	D	L	GF	GA	GD	W	D	L	GF	GA	GD
30	15	8	7	53	30	+23	53	9	6	0	35	13	+22	6	2	7	18	17	+1

Matchday	1	2	3	4	5	6	7	8	9	10	11	12	13	14	15	16	17	18	19	20	21	22	23	24	25	26	27	28	29	30
Ground	A	H	A	H	H	A	H	A	A	H	A	H	A	H	A	A	A	A	H	H	A	H	A	H	H	A	H	A	H	H
Result	W	D	L	W	W	W	W	W	L	D	W	W	W	W	L	D	L	L	W	D	L	D	D	D	W	W	D	L	W	W
Position	3	4	8	4	4	3	2	2	2	2	2	1	1	1	2	1	2	3	2	2	2	2	3	3	3	3	3	3	3	3

A = Away; H = Home; W = Win; D = Draw; L = Loss

==== Matches ====
4 September 2021 1	Chiangmai United	1–2	True Bangkok United	Chiang Mai
18:00 UTC+7	Peerapat 25' (o.g.); Sirisak (yellow card) 70'	Report	Pokklaw (yellow card) 13'; Peerapat (yellow card) 23'; Heberty 49', 78', (yellow card) 86'	Stadium: 700th Anniversary Stadium; Attendance: 0 Referee: Niwat Insa-ard

12 September 2021 2	True Bangkok United	1–1	Port	Pathum Thani
18:00 UTC+7	Carter (yellow card) 15'; Thossawat (yellow card) 24'; Vander 41'; Wisarut (yellow card) 70'	Report	Seul-ki (yellow card) 35'; Bonilla 37'; Dolah (yellow card) 85'	Stadium: True Stadium; Attendance: 0 Referee: Torphong Somsing

17 September 2021 3	Samut Prakan City	3–1	True Bangkok United	Samut Prakan
18:00 UTC+7	Suphanan (yellow card) 42'; Sakai 47'; Chaiyawat (yellow card) 52'; Eliandro 56'; Jaroensak 77'; Kittipong (yellow card) 86'	Report	Thossawat (red card) 30'; Peerapat 81'	Stadium: Samut Prakarn SAT Stadium; Attendance: 0 Referee: Kotchapoom Meesridecha

25 September 2021 4	True Bangkok United	2–0	Buriram United	Pathum Thani
17:30 UTC+7	Everton (yellow card) 6'; Pokklaw 54'; Thitiphan (yellow card) 61'; Heberty 71'; Wisarut (yellow card) 72'; Bihr (yellow card) 83'	Report		Stadium: True Stadium; Attendance: 0 Referee: Phairot Bunkumneod

6 October 2021 5	True Bangkok United	2–1	PT Prachuap	Pathum Thani
18:00 UTC+7	Pokklaw 10'; Carter (yellow card) 68'; Everton (yellow card) 84'; Chananan 88'; Thossawat (yellow card) 90+5'		Mehti (yellow card) 30'; Chinnawat (yellow card) 33'; Saharat 65', (yellow card) 82'	Stadium: True Stadium; Attendance: 0 Referee: Sahapob Sriboonlue

9 October 2021 6	Nakhon Ratchasima	0–2	True Bangkok United	Nakhon Ratchasima
18:00 UTC+7	Metee (yellow card) 45+2'	Report	Thitiphan (yellow card) 14'; Vander 40', (yellow card) 90+1'; Tristan (yellow card) 42'; Everton (yellow card) 45+2'; Peerapat (yellow card) 60'; Falkesgaard (yellow card) 90+3'; Heberty 90+5'	Stadium: 80th Birthday Stadium; Attendance: 899; Referee: Mongkolchai Pechsri

17 October 2021 7	True Bangkok United	1–0	Chonburi	Pathum Thani
18:00 UTC+7	Wisarut (yellow card) 64'; Vander 65', (yellow card) 80'; Falkesgaard (yellow card) 80'	Report	Kanyuk (yellow card) 44'; Songchai (yellow card) 74'; Phitak (yellow card) 85'; Chatmongkol (yellow card) 86'; Kritsada (yellow card) 90+6'	Stadium: True Stadium; Referee: Songkran Bunmeekiart

20 October 2021 8	Ratchaburi Mitr Phol	1–2	True Bangkok United	Ratchaburi
18:00 UTC+7	Jirawat (yellow card) 45'; Kritsananon (yellow card) 56'; Thanaset (yellow card) 72'; Langil 90+5'	Report	Heberty 55', (yellow card) 87'; Putthinan (yellow card) 58'; Vander (yellow card) 66'; Anon 90+1'	Stadium: Mitr Phol Stadium; Attendance: 1,659; Referee: Warintorn Sassadee

24 October 2021 9	BG Pathum United	1–0	True Bangkok United	Pathum Thani
19:00 UTC+7	Santiphap (yellow card) 11'; Chaowat (yellow card) 27'; Túñez (yellow card) 42'; Teerasil 55' (pen.); Sarach (yellow card) 63'; Jakkapan (yellow card) 71'; Ingreso (yellow card) 90'	Report	Vander (yellow card) 25'; Mika (yellow card) 53'	Stadium: Leo Stadium; Attendance: 1,678; Referee: Chaireag Ngamsom

31 October 2021 10	True Bangkok United	1–1	Nongbua Pitchaya	Pathum Thani
18:00 UTC+7	Pansiri 63' (o.g.); Thitiphan (yellow card) 70'; Heberty (yellow card) 75'; Putthinan (yellow card) 80'	Report	Hamilton (yellow card) 45+2', (goal) 71'; Tassanapong (yellow card) 53'; Sathaporn (yellow card) 55'; Warakorn (yellow card) 90+5'	Stadium: True Stadium; Attendance: 0 Referee: Sahapob Sriboonlue

6 November 2021 11	Leo Chiangrai United	0–4	True Bangkok United	Chiang Rai
18:00 UTC+7	Felipe (yellow card) 37'; Tanasak (red card) 69'	Report	Heberty 31', 70'; Vander 56'; Rungrath (yellow card) 89'; Tristan 90+3'	Stadium: Leo Chiangrai Stadium; Attendance: 702; Referee: Sivakorn Pu-udom

9 November 2021 12	True Bangkok United	5–0	Police Tero	Pathum Thani
18:00 UTC+7	Bihr (yellow card) 24'; Wisarut 28'; Tristan 39'; Vander 54'; Heberty (yellow card) 59'; Thossawat 67'; Carter 90' (pen.)	Report	Nattaphol (yellow card) 2'; Sitthichok (yellow card) 53'	Stadium: True Stadium; Attendance: 956; Referee: Songkran Bunmeekiart

14 November 2021 13	Khon Kaen United	0–1	True Bangkok United	Khon Kaen
18:30 UTC+7	Parndecha (yellow card) 12'; Kitphom (yellow card) 28'	Report	Everton (yellow card) 26'; Thossawat (yellow card) 89'; Vander 90+12' (pen.); Falkesgaard (yellow card) 90+15'	Stadium: Khon Kaen Provincial Administrative Organization Stadium; Attendance: 3,248; Referee: Teetichai Nualjan

21 November 2021 14	True Bangkok United	3–1	Muangthong United	Pathum Thani
19:00 UTC+7	Peerapat (red card) 12'; Heberty 34', 55'; Everton 45+1'; Pokklaw (yellow card) 68'	Report	Chatchai (yellow card) 21'; Teeraphol (yellow card) 25', (goal) 38'; Boontawee (yellow card) 32' (yellow-red card) 90+4'; Ballini (yellow card) 45'	Stadium: True Stadium; Attendance: 2,404; Referee: Warintron Sassadee

28 November 2021 15	Suphanburi	2–0	True Bangkok United	Suphan Buri
18:30 UTC+7	Danilo 6', 51'; Santipap (yellow card) 45+3'; Kittisak (yellow card) 64'	Report	Jedsadakorn (yellow card) 68'; Vander (yellow card) 76'	Stadium: Suphan Buri Provincial Stadium; Attendance: 1,101; Referee: Songkran Bunmekiart

9 January 2022 16	Port	1–1	True Bangkok United	Bangkok
18.30 UTC+7	Adisak 41', (yellow card) 78'; Philip (yellow card) 90'	Report	Tristan (yellow card) 85'; Thitiphan 90+1'	Stadium: PAT Stadium; Attendance: 1,053; Referee: Chaireag Ngam-som

23 January 2022 17	Buriram United	1–0	True Bangkok United	Buriram
19.00 UTC+7	Supachai (yellow card) 23'; Supachok 89'; Theerathon (yellow card) 90+1'	Report	Suphan (yellow card) 14'; Wisarut (yellow card) 70'; Everton (yellow card) 81'; Carter (yellow card) 88'	Stadium: Chang Arena; Attendance: 16,398; Referee: Noppadech Muangngam

29 January 2022 18	Nongbua Pitchaya	1–0	True Bangkok United	Nong Bua Lamphu
19.00 UTC+7	Hamilton (yellow card) 11', (goal) 81' (pen.); Barros (yellow card) 45+1'; Nuttawut (yellow card) 53'; Airton (yellow card) 90+5'	Report	Thitiphan (yellow card) 28'; Vander (yellow card) 43'; Thossawat (yellow card) 56'	Stadium: Pitchaya Stadium; Attendance: 3,793; Referee: Sahapob Sriboonlue

2 February 2022 19	True Bangkok United	2–0	Samut Prakan City	Pathum Thani
18.00 UTC+7	Heberty 21'; Wisarut (yellow card) 56'; Vander (yellow card) 67', (goal) 84'; Putthinan (yellow card) 90+4'	Report	Saksit (yellow card) 5'; Ingreso (yellow card) 60'	Stadium: True Stadium; Attendance: 847; Referee: Phairot Bunkamneod

5 February 2022 20	True Bangkok United	0–0	Ratchaburi Mitr Phol	Pathum Thani
18.30 UTC+7	Tristan (yellow card) 87'	Report	Sato (yellow card) 70'; Jirawat (yellow card) 78'	Stadium: True Stadium; Attendance: 1,068; Referee: Songkran Bunmeekiart

13 February 2022 21	PT Prachuap	1–0	True Bangkok United	Prachuap Khiri Khan
18.00 UTC+7	Willen 69'; Peerawat (yellow card) 77'; Chinnawat (yellow card) 88'; Kwanchai (yellow card) 90+4'	Report	Tristan (yellow card) 78'; Thitiphan (yellow card) 85'; Carter (yellow card) 90+2'	Stadium: Sam Ao Stadium; Attendance: 667; Referee: Wiwat Jumpaoon

19 February 2022 22	True Bangkok United	2–2	Nakhon Ratchasima	Pathum Thani
18.00 UTC+7	Pokklaw 3'; Rungrath 20'; Everton (yellow card) 27'; Warut (yellow card) 50'; Suphan (yellow card) 52'	Report	Ouattara 69'; Naruphol (yellow card) 61'; Karikari 77' (pen.)	Stadium: True Stadium; Attendance: 1,050; Referee: Songkran Bunmeekiart

26 February 2022 23	Chonburi	1–1	True Bangkok United	Chonburi
17.30 UTC+7	Bukkoree (yellow card) 71' (yellow-red card) 83'; Everton 90+4' (o.g.)	Report	Heberty 78' (pen.)	Stadium: Chonburi Stadium; Attendance: 3,201; Referee: Chaireag Ngamsom

5 March 2022 24	True Bangkok United	1–1	BG Pathum United	Pathum Thani
18.00 UTC+7	Chananan 36'; Nanthawat (yellow card) 76'; Everton (yellow card) 88'	Report	Diogo (red card) 45+1'; Sumanya 57'; Sarach (yellow card) 71'; Kittipong (yellow card) 90+5'	Stadium: True Stadium; Attendance: 2,672; Referee: Torphong Somsing

19 March 2022 25	True Bangkok United	3–0	Chiangrai United	Pathum Thani
18.30 UTC+7	Everton 21'; Chananan 75', 78'	Report		Stadium: True Stadium; Attendance: 1,921; Referee: Warintron Sassadee

9 April 2022 26	Police Tero	1–4	True Bangkok United	Bangkok
18.00 UTC+7	Arthit 49'	Report	Thitiphan 9'; Chananan 21'; Heberty 57'; Carter 90+4' (pen.)	Stadium: Boonyachinda Stadium; Attendance: 1,072; Referee: Noppadet Mangngam

17 April 2022 27	True Bangkok United	2–2	Khon Kaen United	Pathum Thani
18.00 UTC+7	Chananan 35'; Thitiphan 79'	Report	Yashir 5'; Ibson 12'	Stadium: True Stadium; Attendance: 1,095; Referee: Paisan Bendem-alee

24 April 2022 28	Muangthong United	3–1	True Bangkok United	Nonthaburi
18.00 UTC+7	Anier 9'; Willian Popp 54', 65'	Report	Rungrath 90+2'	Stadium: Thunderdome Stadium; Attendance: 5,635; Referee: Natee Choosuwan

1 May 2022 29	True Bangkok United	5–2	Suphanburi	Pathum Thani
18.00 UTC+7	Heberty 18,65' (pen.), 70'; Wisarut 81'; Rungrath 90+3'	Report	Jakkit 40'; Han-cheol 89'	Stadium: True Stadium; Attendance: 1,085; Referee: Warintron Sassadee

4 May 2022 30	True Bangkok United	4–2	Chiangmai United	Pathum Thani
18.00 UTC+7	Everton 45+3'; Carter 60'; Chananan 71'; Vander 74'	Report	Mika 55' (o.g.); Evson 77' (pen.)	Stadium: True Stadium; Attendance: 1,253; Referee: Sarayut Jakngoen

=== FA Cup ===
27 October 2021 First round	Khon Kaen (T2)	0–3	True Bangkok United (T1)	Khon Kaen
17.00 UTC+7	Burin Wongsrikaeo (yellow card) 37'	Report	Chananan 16', 60'; Nattawut 56'	Stadium: Khon Kaen Provincial Administrative Organization Stadium; Attendance: 516; Referee: Teetichai Nualjan

24 November 2021 Second Round	True Bangkok United (T1)	5–0	Pattaya Dolphins United (T3)	Pathum Thani
19.00 UTC+7	Carter 35', (yellow card) 90+2'; Heberty 38' (pen.); Vander 45'; Anon 73'; Mika (yellow card) 90'; Chananan 90+2'	Report	Sirakorn (yellow card) 69'; Teerapong (yellow card) 86'	Stadium: True Stadium; Attendance: 579; Referee: Natee Choosuwan

19 January 2022 Third Round	True Bangkok United (T1)	0–1	Police Tero (T1)	Pathum Thani
18.00 UTC+7	Bihr (yellow card) 12'	Report	Nattaphol (yellow card) 26'; Sieghart (yellow card) 45+1'; Teeratep (yellow card) 70'; Sitthichok (yellow card) 77'; Evandro 80'; Matsumura (yellow card) 90+4'	Stadium: True Stadium; Attendance: 832; Referee: Sivakorn Pu-udom

=== League Cup ===
12 January 2022 First round	Lampang (T2)	0–0 (a.e.t.) (5–6 p)	True Bangkok United (T1)	Lampang
17.00 UTC+7	Pholtawat (yellow card) 73' (yellow-red card) 102'; Jakkrit (yellow card) 99'; Andrey (yellow card) 101'	Report	Jedsadakorn (yellow card) 81'	Stadium: Lampang Province Stadium; Attendance: 644; Referee: Natee Choosuwan
	Penalties
	Wutthichai (penalty scored); Kantapol (penalty scored); Kritsana (penalty scored); Andrey (penalty scored); Chawin (penalty scored); Jakkrawut (penalty missed)		(penalty scored) Tristan; (penalty scored) Thitiphan; (penalty scored) Everton; (penalty scored) Bihr; (penalty scored) Anon; (penalty scored) Wisarut

9 February 2022 Second round	Khon Kaen United (T1)	0–3	True Bangkok United (T1)	Khon Kaen
18.00 UTC+7	Nattapon (yellow card) 22'	Report	Nattawut 9', 82'; Thitiphan (yellow card) 26'; Heberty 46'; Jedsadakorn (yellow card) 75'	Stadium: Khon Kaen Provincial Administrative Organization Stadium; Attendance: 3,385; Referee: Natee Choosuwan

13 March 2022 Quarter-finals	True Bangkok United (T1)	0–1 (a.e.t.)	Chonburi (T1)	Pathum Thani
18.00 UTC+7		Report	Byung-soo 98'	Stadium: True Stadium; Attendance: 2,279; Referee: Niwat Insa-ard

== Statistics ==
=== Appearances and goals ===
No.	Pos	Nat	Player	Total		Thai League 1		FA Cup		League Cup	
No.	Pos	Nat	Player	Apps	Goals	Apps	Goals	Apps	Goals	Apps	Goals
Goalkeepers
1	GK	(Philippines) PHI	Michael Falkesgaard	22	0	20+1	0	1	0	0	0
34	GK	(Thailand) THA	Warut Mekmusik	15	0	10	0	2	0	2+1	0
52	GK	(Thailand) THA	Supanat Suadsong	1	0	0+1	0	0	0	0	0
68	GK	(Thailand) THA	Phuwadon Phonsongkram	0	0	0	0	0	0	0	0
Defenders
2	DF	(Thailand) THA	Peerapat Notchaiya	29	1	25+1	1	1	0	2	0
3	DF	(Brazil) BRA	Everton	34	2	29	2	2	0	3	0
4	DF	(Thailand) THA	Manuel Bihr	19	0	14+1	0	1+1	0	2	0
5	DF	(Thailand) THA	Putthinan Wannasri	24	0	14+7	0	1+1	0	1	0
16	DF	(Thailand) THA	Mika Chunuonsee	14	0	3+7	0	0+2	0	1+1	0
19	DF	(Thailand) THA	Tristan Do	34	2	28+1	2	2	0	2+1	0
26	DF	(Thailand) THA	Suphan Thongsong	11	0	9	0	1	0	1	0
32	DF	(Thailand) THA	Santipap Yaemsaen	2	0	0+1	0	1	0	0	0
44	DF	(Thailand) THA	Nakin Wisetchat	0	0	0	0	0	0	0	0
55	DF	(Thailand) THA	Sumana Salapphet	1	0	0+1	0	0	0	0	0
81	DF	(Thailand) THA	Nattanon Jaroensingkewan	0	0	0	0	0	0	0	0
Midfielders
7	MF	(Thailand) THA	Anon Amornlerdsak	20	2	5+10	1	1+1	1	1+2	0
8	MF	(Thailand) THA	Wisarut Imura	29	3	25+2	3	0	0	1+1	0
10	MF	(Brazil) BRA	Vander	33	8	25+2	7	2+1	1	1+2	0
15	MF	(Thailand) THA	Nanthawat Kokfai	14	0	1+10	0	2	0	1	0
17	MF	(Thailand) THA	Rungrath Poomchantuek	24	3	11+8	3	3	0	2	0
18	MF	(Thailand) THA	Thitiphan Puangchan	30	3	22+4	3	1	0	2+1	0
21	MF	(Thailand) THA	Chayathorn Tapsuvanavon	0	0	0	0	0	0	0	0
23	MF	(Thailand) THA	Jedsadakorn Kowngam	22	0	3+15	0	2	0	0+2	0
28	MF	(Thailand) THA	Thossawat Limwannasathian	31	1	13+12	1	2+1	0	2+1	0
33	MF	(Thailand) THA	Jirayu Niamthaisong	0	0	0	0	0	0	0	0
35	MF	(Thailand) THA	Pasakorn Biawtungnoi	3	0	0+1	0	0+1	0	0+1	0
39	MF	(Thailand) THA	Pokklaw Anan	30	4	26+1	4	0	0	3	0
47	MF	(Thailand) THA	Thanarin Thumsen	1	0	0	0	0	0	0+1	0
62	MF	(Thailand) THA	Kritsanapon Buncharee	0	0	0	0	0	0	0	0
Forwards
11	FW	(Australia) AUS	Anthony Carter	20	3	8+11	2	1	1	0	0
14	FW	(Thailand) THA	Nattawut Suksum	19	3	4+11	0	1+2	1	1	2
20	FW	(Thailand) THA	Chananan Pombuppha	23	9	7+10	6	2+1	3	2+1	0
22	FW	(Thailand) THA	Guntapon Keereeleang	0	0	0	0	0	0	0	0
37	FW	(Brazil) BRA	Heberty Fernandes	32	17	27+2	15	1	1	2	1
Players transferred/loaned out during the season
31	DF	(Thailand) THA	Jakkit Wachpirom	1	0	0	0	1	0	0	0

Last updated: 4 May 2022
Source: Competitions
