= Richard Sukuta-Pasu =

German footballer (born 1990)

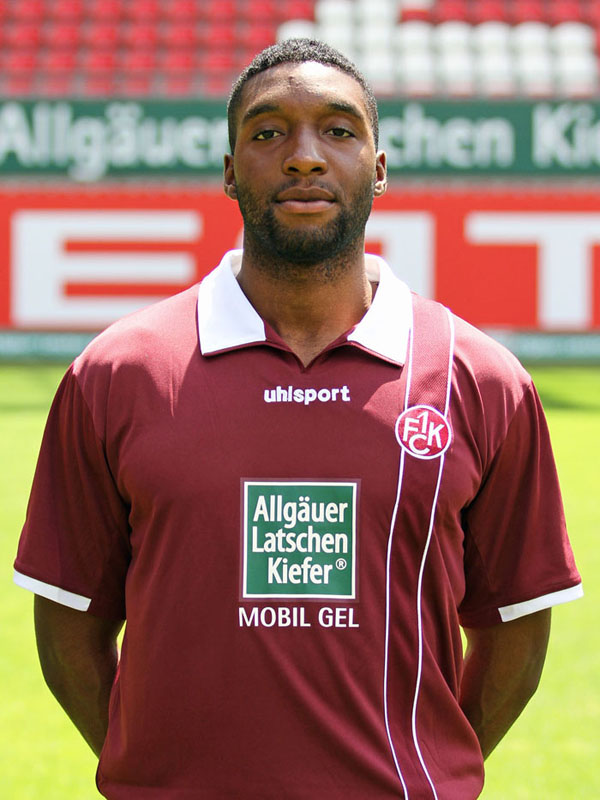
- Sukuta-Pasu with 1. FC Kaiserslautern in 2011

Personal information
- Date of birth: 24 June 1990 (age 36)
- Place of birth: Wuppertal, West Germany
- Height: 1.90 m (6 ft 3 in)
- Position: Forward

Team information
- Current team: Eintracht Hohkeppel

Youth career
- 1998–2000: Grün-Weiß Wuppertal
- 2000–2008: Bayer Leverkusen

Senior career*
Years	Team	Apps	(Gls)
2008–2011	Bayer Leverkusen II	27	(11)
2008–2011	Bayer Leverkusen	4	(0)
2010–2011	→ FC St. Pauli (loan)	22	(2)
2010–2011	→ FC St. Pauli II (loan)	3	(1)
2011–2014	1. FC Kaiserslautern	24	(0)
2012	→ 1. FC Kaiserslautern II	2	(0)
2012–2013	→ Sturm Graz (loan)	31	(12)
2013–2014	→ VfL Bochum (loan)	32	(6)
2014–2015	Cercle Brugge	24	(2)
2015–2016	Energie Cottbus	31	(10)
2016–2018	SV Sandhausen	52	(11)
2018–2019	MSV Duisburg	14	(1)
2019	Guangdong South China Tiger	12	(6)
2020	Seoul E-Land FC	23	(7)
2021	Police Tero	0	(0)
2021–2022	SV Meppen	19	(5)
2022–2023	Vejle	30	(8)
2024	Fortuna Köln	9	(1)
2024–	Eintracht Hohkeppel	0	(0)

International career
2005–2007	Germany U-17	20	(9)
2007–2008	Germany U-18	5	(2)
2008–2010	Germany U-19	12	(6)
2009	Germany U-20	6	(2)
2008–2011	Germany U-21	10	(1)
Medal record
Germany U-17
Third place	FIFA U-17 World Cup	2007
Germany U-19
Winner	UEFA U-19 Championship	2008
- * Club domestic league appearances and goals as of 18 May 2024

Richard Sukuta-Pasu (born 24 June 1990) is a German professional footballer who plays as a forward for Regionalliga club Eintracht Hohkeppel.

== Club career ==
Sukuta-Pasu began his career in summer 1998 in his hometown Wuppertal with Grün-Weiß Wuppertal and was scouted by Bundesliga club Bayer Leverkusen in June 2000. He played for Bayer in several youth teams and was promoted to the reserve team in summer 2008. Since October 2008 he was also part of the Bayer's Bundesliga squad and earned his first four Bundesliga caps during the 2008–09 season. In December 2009, he was loaned to 2. Bundesliga club FC St. Pauli until 30 June 2011.

He made his debut for St. Pauli on 16 January 2010 by coming off the bench to score with his second touch in the 88th minute of the match against Rot Weiss Ahlen. After leaving St. Pauli in June 2011, he has spells with 1. FC Kaiserslautern, Sturm Graz and VfL Bochum. In summer 2014, Sukuta-Pasu transferred to Belgian Cercle Brugge. After only a year with Cercle, he returned to Germany joining 3. Liga side Energie Cottbus on a free transfer, signing a contract until 2017.

In May 2018, MSV Duisburg announced Sukuta-Pasu would join from SV Sandhausen for the 2018–19 season having agreed a two-year contract until 2020.

On 25 February 2019, Sukuta-Pasu transferred to China League One club Guangdong South China Tiger.

On 29 January 2020, Sukuta-Pasu joined K League 2 club Seoul E-Land FC.

Sukuta-Pasu returned to Germany in October 2021, joining 3. Liga club SV Meppen. He signed a two-year contract. On 22 June 2022 it was confirmed, that Sukuta-Pasu had signed with newly relegated Danish 1st Division club Vejle Boldklub, penning a deal until June 2024. In August 2023, after Vejle was promoted to the 2023–24 Danish Superliga, Vejle confirmed that Sasu's contract had been terminated by mutual agreement, as the German was too far away from playing time.

== International career ==
Sukuta-Pasu played at the 2008 European U-19 championships, where he scored three goals, including the winner in the final against Italy, and the 2007 U-17 World Cup.

== Personal life ==
He is son to a Congolese father and a French mother. Fellow professional footballer Wilson Kamavuaka is his second cousin.

== Career statistics ==
As of 22 June 2020

Appearances and goals by club, season and competition
Club	Season	League			Cup		Other		Total	
Club	Season	Division	Apps	Goals	Apps	Goals	Apps	Goals	Apps	Goals
Bayer Leverkusen II	2008–09	Regionalliga West	18	7	—		—		18	7
Bayer Leverkusen II	2009–10	Regionalliga West	9	4	—		—		9	4
Bayer Leverkusen II	Total		26	11	0	0	0	0	27	11
Bayer Leverkusen	2008–09	Bundesliga	4	0	1	0	—		5	0
FC St. Pauli II	2009–10	Regionalliga Nord	3	1	—		—		3	1
FC St. Pauli	2009–10	2. Bundesliga	13	1	0	0	—		13	1
FC St. Pauli	2010–11	Bundesliga	9	1	0	0	—		9	1
FC St. Pauli	Total		22	2	0	0	0	0	22	2
1. FC Kaiserslautern	2011–12	Bundesliga	24	0	2	1	—		26	1
1. FC Kaiserslautern II	2011–12	Regionalliga West	2	0	—		—		2	0
Sturm Graz	2012–13	Austrian Bundesliga	31	12	2	0	—		33	12
VfL Bochum	2013–14	2. Bundesliga	32	6	2	0	—		34	6
Cercle Brugge	2014–15	Pro League	24	2	4	1	1	0	29	3
Energie Cottbus	2015–16	3. Liga	31	10	0	0	–		31	10
SV Sandhausen	2016–17	2. Bundesliga	25	5	3	2	—		28	7
SV Sandhausen	2017–18	2. Bundesliga	27	6	1	0	—		28	6
SV Sandhausen	Total		52	11	4	2	0	0	56	13
MSV Duisburg	2018–19	2. Bundesliga	14	1	3	0	–		17	1
Guangdong South China Tiger	2019	China League One	12	6	1	1	–		13	7
Seoul E-Land FC	2020	K League 2	23	7	1	0	–		24	7
Police Tero	2021–22	Thai League 1	0	0	0	0	–		0	0
Career total			299	69	20	5	1	0	321	74

== Honours ==
Vejle

- Danish 1st Division: 2022–23
