= Nattapon Tep-uthai =

Thai footballer (born 1991)

Personal information
- Full name: Nattapon Tep-uthai
- Date of birth: 2 September 1991 (age 35)
- Place of birth: Lopburi, Thailand
- Height: 1.81 m (5 ft 11 1/2 in)
- Position: Right-back

Team information
- Current team: Lopburi City
- Number: 16

Youth career
- 2010–2012: BEC Tero Sasana

Senior career*
Years	Team	Apps	(Gls)
2012	Pathum Thani United		
2013	Phichit		
2014	Rangsit		
2015	Army United		
2016	Nakhon Pathom United	4	(0)
2017	Bangkok Glass	6	(0)
2018–2019	Chainat Hornbill	23	(1)
2019	Air Force United	22	(1)
2020	Suphanburi	0	(0)
2020	Songkhla	5	(0)
2021–2022	Khon Kaen United	2	(0)
2022–2023	Phitsanulok	16	(0)
2023–	Lopburi City	7	(0)
- * Club domestic league appearances and goals as of 6 May 2023

Nattapon Tep-uthai (Thai: ณัฐพล เทพอุทัย, born September 2, 1991) is a Thai professional footballer who plays as a centre-back.

== Honours ==
Phitsanulok

- Thai League 3 Northern Region: 2022–23
