= Nattawut Munsuwan =

Thai footballer

Personal information
- Full name: Nattawut Munsuwan
- Date of birth: 24 April 1998 (age 28)
- Place of birth: Bangkok, Thailand
- Height: 1.80 m (5 ft 11 in)
- Positions: Forward; winger

Team information
- Current team: Trat (on loan from Lamphun Warriors)
- Number: 14

Youth career
- 2013–2015: Rajdamnern Commercial College
- 2015: Buriram United

Senior career*
Years	Team	Apps	(Gls)
2016–2018	Nakhon Pathom United	0	(0)
2017–2018	→ Satun United (loan)	32	(7)
2019–2024	Police Tero	49	(3)
2024–	Lamphun Warriors	6	(0)
2025	Chiangmai United	11	(2)
2026–	→ Trat (loan)	0	(0)

International career^{‡}
2018–2019	Thailand U23	1	(0)
- * Club domestic league appearances and goals as of 26 May 2025 ‡ National team caps and goals as of 13 May 2023

Nattawut Munsuwan (Thai: นัฐวุฒิ มูลสุวรรณ; born 24 May 1998) is a Thai professional footballer who plays as a forward or a winger for Thai League club Lamphun Warriors.
