= Siam Yapp =

Thai footballer

Personal information
- Full name: Siam Yapp
- Date of birth: 27 May 2004 (age 22)
- Place of birth: Phuket, Thailand
- Height: 1.81 m (5 ft 11 in)
- Positions: Forward; winger

Team information
- Current team: Police Tero
- Number: 10

Youth career
- 2016–2020: British International School, Phuket
- 2021–2022: Bangkok United

Senior career*
Years	Team	Apps	(Gls)
2022–2024	Police Tero	12	(1)
2023	→ Bangkok (loan)	11	(1)
2024–2025	Buriram United	2	(0)
2024–2025	→ Nakhon Ratchasima (loan)	12	(2)
2025–2026	Uthai Thani	4	(0)
2026	Paju Frontier	0	(0)
2026–	Police Tero	4	(1)

International career
2019	Thailand U16	2	(0)
2025–	Thailand U23	2	(0)
- * Club domestic league appearances and goals as of 13 July 2025 (UTC)

Siam Yapp (Thai: สยาม แยปป์, born 27 May 2004) is a Thai professional footballer who plays as a forward or a winger for Thai League 2 club Police Tero.

== Career ==
=== Club career ===
As a youth player, Yapp joined the British International School, Phuket in Thailand. Before the 2022 season, he signed for Thai top flight side Police Tero. On 9 April 2022, he debuted for Police Tero during a 1–4 loss to Bangkok United.

=== International career ===
Yapp is eligible to represent England internationally.

In 2019, Yapp represented 2019 Thailand U15 in the 2019 AFF U-15 Championship playing 2 games in the tournament.

== Honours ==
=== Individual ===
- Thai League 1 Goal of the Month: August 2023
