= Anthony Carter (soccer, born 1994) =

Australian professional footballer

Personal information
- Full name: Anthony Charles Carter
- Date of birth: 31 August 1994 (age 32)
- Place of birth: Dandenong, Australia
- Height: 1.92 m (6 ft 4 in)
- Position: Forward

Team information
- Current team: Vizela
- Number: 99

Youth career
- Melbourne Phoenix
- Genova ISS
- 2012–2014: CFR Cluj

Senior career*
Years	Team	Apps	(Gls)
2014–2016	CFR Cluj	4	(0)
2014	→ Sănătatea Cluj (loan)		
2016–2018	Trofense	39	(18)
2018–2019	Benfica B	13	(1)
2019–2021	Académico Viseu	53	(14)
2021–2022	Bangkok United	19	(3)
2022–2023	Macarthur	10	(1)
2023–2024	Oliveirense	37	(9)
2024–2025	Alverca	32	(15)
2025–2026	Santa Clara	5	(0)
2025–2026	→ Farense (loan)	14	(2)
2026–	Vizela	2	(2)
- * Club domestic league appearances and goals as of 17:03, 30 August 2026 (UTC)

Anthony Charles Carter (born 31 August 1994) is an Australian professional footballer who plays as a forward for Liga Portugal 2 club Vizela.

== Club career ==
Born in Dandenong, Victoria and hailing from Noble Park in the same state, Carter played youth football with Melbourne Phoenix and at the Genova International School of Soccer. He finished his development in Romania with CFR Cluj.

In March 2013, Carter signed a senior contract with Cluj. He made his Liga I debut for the club on 10 April 2015, as a late substitute in a 1–0 away loss against FC Universitatea Cluj; during his spell at the Stadionul Dr. Constantin Rădulescu, he totalled only 81 minutes in the league.

Carter then spent two seasons in the Portuguese third division with C.D. Trofense. He scored 15 goals in all competitions in the first.

On 24 January 2018, Carter joined S.L. Benfica on a four-and-a-half-year deal, being assigned to the reserves in the LigaPro. He scored his first goal as a professional on 7 April, opening the 1–1 draw at F.C. Penafiel.

On 28 June 2019, Carter moved to Académico de Viseu F.C. of the same tier on a two-year contract. The following 16 January, his 91st-minute strike helped the hosts defeat CF Canelas 2010 1–0 and qualify for the semi-finals of the Taça de Portugal.

Carter returned to his homeland in July 2022 after more than a decade, agreeing to a deal at Macarthur FC from Thai League 1 side Bangkok United FC. He scored his only goal in the A-League on 29 October, closing the 2–3 home loss against Sydney FC. He also won the Australia Cup during his tenure.

In January 2023, Carter went back to Portugal and its division two, signing with U.D. Oliveirense. On 12 January 2024, he netted twice in a 2–0 away win over Leixões SC, the first goal coming through a 53rd-minute penalty.

Carter remained in that league in 2024–25, joining newly promoted F.C. Alverca. He was crowned top scorer in his debut campaign alongside U.D. Leiria's Juan Muñoz at 15 goals, and the club returned to the Primeira Liga after a 21-year absence.

On 16 June 2025, Carter remained signed a three-year contract with top-tier C.D. Santa Clara. Six months later, after struggling for game time, he was loaned to S.C. Farense in the league below with an option to make the move permanent at the end of the season.

On 2 June 2026, Carter moved to second-division side F.C. Vizela on a two-year deal.

== Style of play ==
Carter is primarily known for his speed. He can also shoot with both his right and left feet.

== Career statistics ==
As of match played 17 May 2026

Appearances and goals by club, season and competition
Club	Season	League			National cup		League cup		Continental		Other		Total	
Club	Season	Division	Apps	Goals	Apps	Goals	Apps	Goals	Apps	Goals	Apps	Goals	Apps	Goals
CFR Cluj	2014–15	Liga I	3	0	1	0	—		—		—		4	0
CFR Cluj	2015–16	Liga I	1	0	1	0	—		—		1 (Note: Appearance in Liga I relegation play-outs)	0	3	0
CFR Cluj	Total		4	0	2	0	—		—		1	0	7	0
Trofense	2016–17	Campeonato de Portugal	25	14	2	1	—		—		—		27	15
Trofense	2017–18	Campeonato de Portugal	14	4	1	0	—		—		—		15	4
Trofense	Total		39	18	3	1	—		—		—		42	19
Benfica B	2017–18	Liga Portugal 2	13	1	—		—		—		—		13	1
Académico Viseu	2019–20	Liga Portugal 2	22	5	6	1	1	0	—		—		29	6
Académico Viseu	2020–21	Liga Portugal 2	31	9	3	0	0	0	—		—		34	9
Académico Viseu	Total		53	14	9	1	1	0	—		—		63	15
Bangkok United	2021–22	Thai League 1	19	3	1	1	—		—		—		20	4
Macarthur	2022–23	A-League Men	10	1	5	1	—		—		—		15	2
Oliveirense	2022–23	Liga Portugal 2	10	4	0	0	0	0	—		—		10	4
Oliveirense	2023–24	Liga Portugal 2	27	5	2	0	1	0	—		—		30	5
Oliveirense	Total		37	9	2	0	1	0	—		—		40	9
Alverca	2024–25	Liga Portugal 2	32	15	3	2	0	0	—		—		35	17
Santa Clara	2025–26	Primeira Liga	5	0	1	0	0	0	2 (Note: Appearances in UEFA Conference League)	0	—		8	0
Farense	2025–26	Liga Portugal 2	14	2	0	0	—		—		—		14	2
Career total			226	63	26	6	2	0	2	0	1	0	257	69

== Honours ==
Macarthur

- Australia Cup: 2022
