= Yodsak Chaowana =

Thai footballer

Personal information
- Full name: Yodsak Chaowana
- Date of birth: 20 April 1996 (age 30)
- Place of birth: Bangkok, Thailand
- Height: 1.79 m (5 ft 10 1/2 in)
- Positions: Winger; forward

Youth career
- 2008–2010: ThaiBev Football Academy
- 2011–2014: Assumption Thonburi

Senior career*
Years	Team	Apps	(Gls)
2015	Assumption United		
2016–2017	Customs United	4	(2)
2018–2019	Air Force Central	32	(2)
2019	Ratchaburi Mitr Phol	3	(0)
2020–2024	Police Tero	65	(3)
2024–2025	Kasetsart	18	(1)
2025	Sisaket United	3	(0)
2026	Ayutthaya United	0	(0)
- * Club domestic league appearances and goals as of 26 January 2026

Yodsak Chaowana (Thai: ยศศักดิ์ เชาวนะ; born 20 April 1996) is a Thai professional footballer who plays as a winger or a forward for Thai League 1 club Ayutthaya United.
