= Jirawat Thongsaengphrao =

Thai footballer

Personal information
- Date of birth: 31 March 1998 (age 28)
- Place of birth: Ayutthaya, Thailand
- Height: 1.82 m (5 ft 11 1/2 in)
- Positions: Left back; centre-back

Team information
- Current team: Sukhothai

Youth career
- 2012–2015: Buriram United

Senior career*
Years	Team	Apps	(Gls)
2015–2016	Buriram United	0	(0)
2015	→ Surin City (loan)	10	(0)
2016–2018	Ayutthaya United	32	(3)
2019–2025	Ratchaburi Mitr Phol	85	(2)
2020	→ Suphanburi (loan)	10	(0)
2023	→ Police Tero (loan)	12	(0)
2025–2026	Chanthaburi	27	(0)
2026–	Sukhothai	0	(0)

International career
2015	Thailand U19	2	(0)
- * Club domestic league appearances and goals as of 15 April 2026

Jirawat Thongsaengphrao (Thai: จิรวัฒน์ ทองแสงพราว, born 31 March 1998) is a Thai professional footballer who plays as a left back for Thai League 1 club Sukhothai.
