= Anon Samakorn =

Thai footballer

Personal information
- Full name: Anon Samakorn
- Date of birth: 13 July 1998 (age 28)
- Place of birth: Samut Sakhon, Thailand
- Height: 1.81 m (5 ft 11 1/2 in)
- Position: Defensive midfielder

Youth career
- 2010–2013: Assumption College Thonburi
- 2013–2017: Leicester City
- 2017–2018: OH Leuven

Senior career*
Years	Team	Apps	(Gls)
2018–2019	Port	7	(0)
2020–2022	Nakhon Ratchasima	14	(0)
2021–2022	→ Police Tero (loan)	6	(1)
2022–2024	Kasetsart	57	(1)
2024	Chiangmai United	3	(0)

International career^{‡}
2019	Thailand U23	3	(0)
- * Club domestic league appearances and goals as of 30 December 2024 ‡ National team caps and goals as of 24 February 2019

Anon Samakorn (Thai: อนนต์ สมากร; born 13 July 1998) is a Thai professional footballer who plays as a defensive midfielder for Thai League 2 club Chiangmai United.

== International career ==
In February 2019, He was selected in Thailand U23 squad for 2019 AFF U-22 Youth Championship in Cambodia.

== Honours ==
=== International ===
Thailand U-23

- 2019 AFF U-22 Youth Championship: Runners-up

Port

- Thai FA Cup (1) : 2019
