= Chumpol Bua-ngam =

Thai footballer (born 1986)

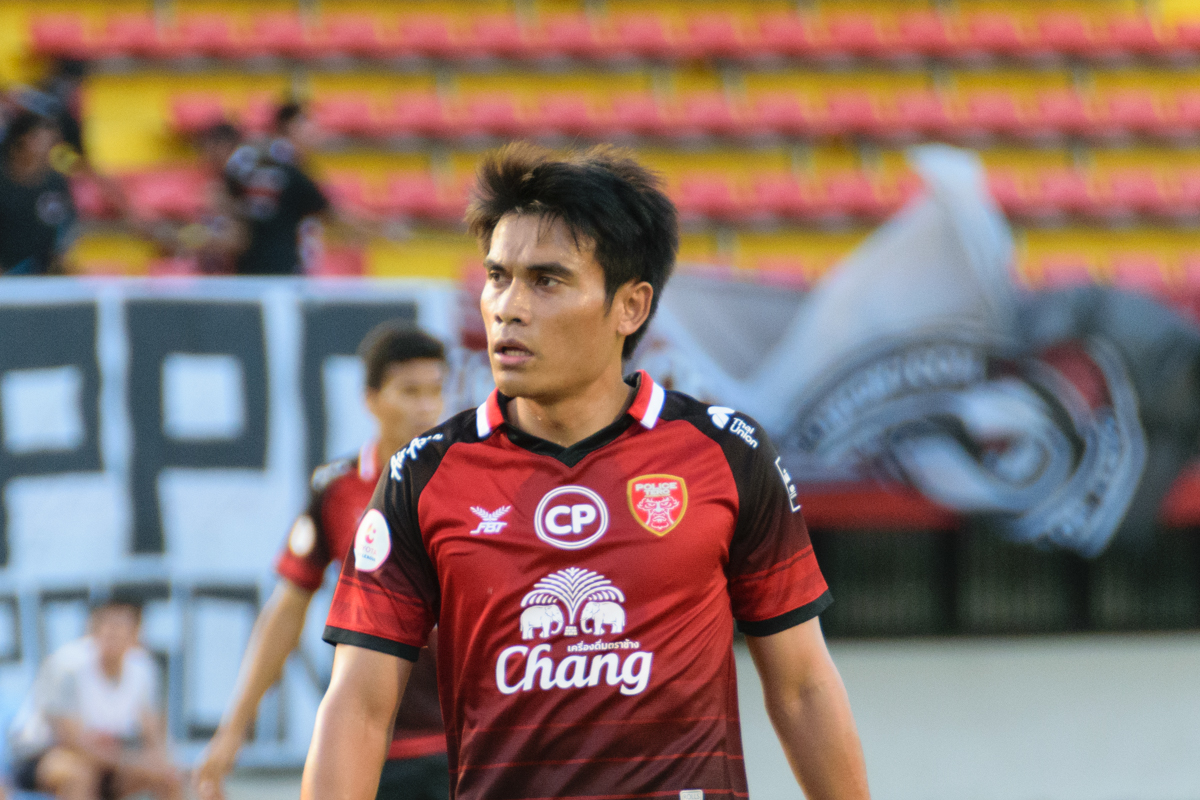

Personal information
- Full name: Chumpol Bua-ngam
- Date of birth: 2 September 1986 (age 40)
- Place of birth: Sisaket, Thailand
- Height: 1.77 m (5 ft 9 1/2 in)
- Positions: Centre back; left back

Youth career
- 2002–2004: Ratwinit Bangkaeo School

Senior career*
Years	Team	Apps	(Gls)
2005–2006	Bangkok United	0	(0)
2007–2010	Samutsongkhram	49	(2)
2011	Chanthaburi	5	(0)
2012–2013	Police United	44	(4)
2014–2019	Ratchaburi Mitr Phol	69	(2)
2017–2018	→ Police Tero (loan)	19	(1)
2019–2024	Police Tero	79	(1)
2024	Samut Sakhon City	5	(0)
2024–	BFB Pattaya City	0	(0)
- * Club domestic league appearances and goals as of 26 May 2024

Chumpol Bua-ngam (Thai: ชุมพล บัวงาม, born September 2, 1986), simply known as Wut (Thai: วุฒิ), is a Thai professional footballer who plays as a centre back or a left back.
