= Taninnat Athisaraworameth =

Thai association football player

Veerapat Nilburapha
Personal information
- Full name: Veerapat Nilburapha
- Date of birth: 22 June 1996 (age 30)
- Place of birth: Khon Kaen, Thailand
- Height: 1.85 m (6 ft 1 in)
- Position: Forward

Team information
- Current team: Customs United
- Number: 36

Youth career
- 2011–2015: Bangkok Glass

Senior career*
Years	Team	Apps	(Gls)
2015–2017	BG Pathum United	0	(0)
2016	→ Chiangmai (loan)	14	(2)
2017–2023	Bangkok United	2	(0)
2020–2021	→ PT Prachuap (loan)	6	(0)
2021	→ Khon Kaen United (loan)	7	(0)
2022	→ Police Tero (loan)	13	(0)
2022–2023	→ Sukhothai (loan)	15	(0)
2023–	Customs United	9	(0)
- * Club domestic league appearances and goals as of 10 December 2023

Veerapat Nilburapha (Thai: วีรภัทร นิลบูรพา, born 22 June 1996), is a Thai professional footballer who plays as a forward for Thai League 2 club Customs United.
