= Nattaphol Sukchai =

Thai footballer (born 1992)

Personal information
- Full name: Nattaphol Sukchai
- Date of birth: 10 September 1992 (age 34)
- Place of birth: Yasothon, Thailand
- Height: 1.75 m (5 ft 9 in)
- Position: Full back

Senior career*
Years	Team	Apps	(Gls)
2015–2019	Bangkok Glass	1	(0)
2016–2017	→ Chiangmai (loan)		
2018	→ Sisaket (loan)		
2020–2023	Police Tero	52	(3)
- * Club domestic league appearances and goals as of 9 April 2023

Nattaphol Sukchai (Thai: ณัฐพล สุขไชย; born 10 September 1992) is a Thai professional footballer who plays as a full back.
