= 2013 BEC Tero Sasana F.C. season =

BEC Tero Sasana
2013 season
- Chairman: Brian Marcar
- Manager: José Alves Borges
- Stadium: 72-years Anniversary Stadium
- Thai Premier League: 7th
- Thai FA Cup: Fourth round
- League Cup: Second Round
- Top goalscorer: Cleiton Silva (20)

The 2013 season was BEC Tero Sasana's 17th season in the Thai Premier League.

== Players ==
=== Squad information ===
No.	Nationality	Name	Position
Goalkeepers
1	(Thailand)	Pisan Dorkmaikaew	GK
19	(Thailand)	Somporn Yos	GK
27	(Thailand)	Sujin Nakayom	GK
29	(Thailand)	Worawut Kaewpook	GK
Defenders
2	(Thailand)	Peerapat Notechaiya	LB
3	(Democratic Republic of the Congo)	Bukasa Kasonga	CB
4	(Thailand)	Chalermsuk Kaewsuktae	CB
8	(Thailand)	Apiwat Ngaolamhin	CB
11	(Thailand)	Apichet Puttan	RB
13	(Thailand)	Narubadin Weerawatnodom	RB
17	(Ghana)	Isaac Honny	CB
22	(Thailand)	Jetsada Phulek	LB
Midfielders
5	(Thailand)	Amorn Thammanarm	RM
7	(Thailand)	Rangsan Viwatchaichok	CM
10	(Spain)	Arzu	DM
14	(Thailand)	Wichaya Dechmitr	CM
16	(Japan)	Sho Shimoji	LM
18	(Thailand)	Chanathip Songkrasin	AM
20	(Thailand)	Tanaboon Kesarat	DM
21	(Thailand)	Yai Nilwong	LM
24	(Thailand)	Surachet Sathaworawanit	CM
26	(Ghana)	Samuel Drogbele	CM
31	(Thailand)	Anon San-Mhard	LM
Forwards
9	(Brazil)	Lucas Gaúcho	CF
15	(Thailand)	Sarif Sainui	CF
23	(Brazil)	Cleiton Silva	CF
32	(Thailand)	Dennis Buschening	CF

=== Transfers ===
==== In ====
#	Position	Player	Transferred from
8	DF	(Thailand) Apiwat Ngaolamhin	(Thailand) Osotspa
21	MF	(Thailand) Yai Nilwong	(Thailand) Esan United
25	MF	(Brazil) Gabriel Davis	(Brazil) Boa Esporte
22	DF	(Thailand) Jetsada Phulek	(Thailand) Samut Songkhram
11	DF	(Thailand) Apichet Puttan	(Thailand) Buriram United
15	FW	(Thailand) Sarif Sainui	(Thailand) Buriram United
39	FW	(France) Jonathan Béhé	(Russia) Luch-Energiya
	FW	(Thailand) Issarapong Lilakorn	(Thailand) Bangkok
31	MF	(Thailand) Anon San-Mhard	(Thailand) Bangkok
	FW	(South Korea) Yeon Gi-Sung	(Thailand) Buriram United
9	FW	(Brazil) Lucas Gaúcho	(Brazil) São José-PA
24	MF	(Thailand) Surachet Sathaworawanit	(Thailand) Samut Songkhram

==== Out ====
#	Position	Player	Transferred to
5	DF	(Thailand) Prat Samakrat	(Thailand) Suphanburi
21	MF	(Japan) Yusuke Kato	(Thailand) Nakhon Ratchasima
9	FW	(Thailand) Ronnachai Rangsiyo	(Thailand) Bangkok United
	GK	(Thailand) Samuel Cunningham	(Thailand) Air Force
	DF	(Australia) Aleksandar Jovanović	(South Korea) Suwon FC
4	FW	(Algeria) Khaled Kharroubi	Released
16	MF	(Spain) Regino	(Malaysia) Kedah FA
	MF	(Thailand) Panuwat Yimsa-ngar	(Thailand) Ratchaburi
	DF	(Thailand) Wutthisak Maneesook	(Thailand) Ratchaburi
	DF	(Thailand) Apisit Kamwang	(Thailand) Esan United
6	DF	(Thailand) Nattaporn Phanrit	(Thailand) Bangkok United
39	FW	(France) Jonathan Béhé	Released
25	MF	(Brazil) Gabriel Davis	Released

==== Loan in ====
#	Position	Player	Transferred from
32	FW	(Thailand) Dennis Buschening	(Thailand) Buriram United
4	MF	(Thailand) Chalermsuk Kaewsuktae	(Thailand) PTT Rayong

==== Loan Out ====
#	Position	Player	Transferred to
	DF	(Thailand) Korrakot Wiriyaudomsiri	(Thailand) Bangkok Glass
17	MF	(Ghana) Gilbert Koomson	(Thailand) Samut Songkhram
21	MF	(Thailand) Yai Nilwong	(Thailand) Bangkok United
9	FW	(Thailand) Sarayuth Chaikamdee	(Thailand) Samut Songkhram
	FW	(Thailand) Issarapong Lilakorn	(Thailand) Samut Songkhram
	FW	(South Korea) Yeon Gi-sung	(Thailand) PTT Rayong

== Thai Premier League ==
Pos	Team	Pld	W	D	L	GF	GA	GD	Pts
5	Bangkok Glass	32	14	8	10	40	31	+9	50
6	Army United	32	13	9	10	48	40	+8	48
7	BEC Tero Sasana	32	13	9	10	56	49	+7	48
8	Osotspa Saraburi	32	9	12	11	38	43	−5	39
9	INSEE Police	32	9	11	12	40	37	+3	38

Updated to match(es) played on 3 November 2013. Source: Thai Premier League

=== Matches ===
2 March 2013 1	BEC Tero Sasana	2–2	Chonburi	Bangkok
18:00	Amorn 4'; Cleiton 7'; Arzu (red card) 90+3'		19' Bachdim; (yellow card) 39' Bachdim; 89' Bošković	Stadium: 72nd Anniversary Stadium; Attendance: 6,856; Referee: Mongkolchai Pechsri

10 March 2013 2	Ratchaburi	0–1	BEC Tero Sasana	Ratchaburi
18:00	Rattana (yellow card) 13'; Naruphol (yellow card) 18'; Banluesak (yellow card) 66'; Prayad (yellow card) 83'		(yellow card) 30' Honny; 36' Cleiton; (yellow card) 37' Cleiton; (yellow card) 75' Apichet; (yellow card) 62' Apiwat; (yellow card) 84' Narubadin; (yellow card) 90+5' Béhé	Stadium: Ratchaburi Stadium; Attendance: 5,252; Referee: Anuwat Feemuechang

27 March 2013 3	BEC Tero Sasana	3–1	Pattaya United	Bangkok
18:30	Shimoji 16, 84'; Arzu 84'		(yellow card) 21' Anuwat; 74' Ji-Soo	Stadium: 72nd Anniversary Stadium; Attendance: 4,239; Referee: Praphot Ditsomsri

30 March 2013 4	Bangkok United	2–3	BEC Tero Sasana	Bangkok
18:00	Sompong 62'; Wittaya (yellow card) 63'; Gasmi 70'; Alef (yellow card) 90+4'		26' Cleiton; (yellow card) 57' Wichaya; 65' Rangsan; (yellow card) 69' Apiwat; 77' Arzu	Stadium: Thai-Japanese Stadium; Attendance: 3,367; Referee: Chaireag Ngamsom

7 April 2013 5	BEC Tero Sasana	2–3	TOT	Bangkok
18:00	Wichaya 23, 26'; Rangsan (yellow card) 38'		14' Noppol; 25' Jun-Ki; (yellow card) 37' Suriya; (yellow card) 41' Prakit; 68' Panomkorn	Stadium: 72nd Anniversary Stadium; Attendance: 5,139; Referee: Atthakorn Wetchakan

17 April 2013 6	Suphanburi	1–1	BEC Tero Sasana	Suphanburi
18:00	Castillo 56' (yellow card) 67'		(yellow card) 25' Apichet; 39' Cleiton; (yellow card) 50' Arzu; (yellow card) 62' Apiwat; (yellow card) 73' Béhé	Stadium: Suphanburi Municipality Stadium; Attendance: 13,759; Referee: Ko Hyung-Jin

21 April 2013 7	BEC Tero Sasana	1–0	Bangkok Glass	Bangkok
18:00	Rangsan 5'; Wichaya (yellow card) 15'; Chanathip (yellow card) 66'; Peerapat (yellow card) 15'; Cleiton (yellow card) 76'		(yellow card) 15' Phuritad; (yellow card) 27' Teeratep; (yellow card) 79' Piyachart; (yellow card) 89' Pakin; (yellow card) 90+2' Narit	Stadium: 72nd Anniversary Stadium; Attendance: 6,439; Referee: Thanom Borikut

28 April 2013 8	Chainat Hornbill	1–1	BEC Tero Sasana	Chainat
18:00	Somjet 29' (yellow card) 43' (yellow-red card) 74'; Tae-Keun (yellow card) 32'; Wanchana (yellow card) 72'; Noppol (yellow card) 87'		56' Shimoji; (yellow card) 64' Amorn; (yellow card) 87' Cleiton; (yellow card) 90' Apichet	Stadium: Khao Plong Stadium; Attendance: 4,446; Referee: Sivakorn Pu-udom

4 May 2013 9	BEC Tero Sasana	v	Sisaket	Bangkok
18:00				Stadium: 72nd Anniversary Stadium

12 May 2013 10	Songkhla United	0–0	BEC Tero Sasana	Songkhla
18:00			(yellow card) 67' Wichaya	Stadium: Tinsulanon Stadium; Attendance: 5,719; Referee: Prathan Nasawang

16 May 2013 11	BEC Tero Sasana	1–1	Buriram United	Bangkok
19:00	Peerapat (yellow card) 50'; Chanathip 57'		10' Carmelo; (yellow card) 55' (yellow-red card) 77' Suchao	Stadium: 72nd Anniversary Stadium; Attendance: 6,738; Referee: Olim Talibdjanov

25 May 2013 12	Chiangrai United	0–3	BEC Tero Sasana	Chiang Rai
18:30			(yellow card) 6' Kasonga; 26' Cleiton; 74' Shimoji; 83' Wichaya	Stadium: Chiang Rai United Stadium; Attendance: 9716; Referee: Sumate Saiwaew

29 May 2013 13	BEC Tero Sasana	3–2	Police United	Bangkok
19:00	Cleiton 5, 62'; Shimoji (yellow card) 19' (goal) 48'; Honny (yellow card) 43'; Peerapat (yellow card) 74'		(yellow card) 33' Surachat; (yellow card) 36' Decha; 47' Chompon; 77' Tana; (yellow card) 78' Pokklaw	Stadium: 72nd Anniversary Stadium; Attendance: 3,713; Referee: Titichai Nuanchan

1 June 2013 14	Samut Songkhram	0–2	BEC Tero Sasana	Samut Songkhram
18:00	Adison (yellow card) 82'		8' (yellow card) 20' Sarif; 48' Cleiton; (yellow card) 52' Apiwat; (yellow card) 57' Amorn	Stadium: Samut Songkhram Stadium; Attendance: 1,450; Referee: Aliaksei Kulbakov

8 June 2013 15	BEC Tero Sasana	1–1	Osotspa	Bangkok
18:00	Cleiton (yellow card) 22'; Shimoji 45+6' (yellow card) 90+1'		65' Chananan; (yellow card) 68' Yamamoto; (yellow card) 90+5' Narong	Stadium: 72nd Anniversary Stadium; Attendance: 3,963; Referee: Taweechai Supatwan

23 June 2013 16	Muangthong United	3–1	BEC Tero Sasana	Nonthaburi
18:30	Sarawut (yellow card) 24'; Teerasil 59, 90+1'; Kwang-chon 78'		38' Amorn; (yellow card) 62' Peerapat; (yellow card) 78' Wichaya; (yellow card) 90+2' Tanaboon Kesarat	Stadium: SCG Stadium; Attendance: 8,079; Referee: Qing Yao

30 June 2013 17	Army United	2–1	BEC Tero Sasana	Bangkok
18:00	Nipol 25' (yellow card) 34'; Anuwat (yellow card) 73'; Chaiwat (yellow card) 81'; Mongkol 90+2'		(yellow card) 9' Jetsada; (yellow card) 56' Kasongo; (yellow card) 69' Arzu; 74' Apiwat	Stadium: Thai Army Sports Stadium; Attendance: 5,248; Referee: Thaweep Inkeaw

7 July 2013 18	Chonburi	3–0	BEC Tero Sasana	Chonburi
18:30	Bošković 17'; Chakrit 42'; Chayaphat 84'		(yellow card) 56' (yellow-red card) 70' Wichaya	Stadium: Chonburi Municipality Stadium; Attendance: 5,959; Referee: Abdul Malik Abdul Bashir

21 July 2013 19	BEC Tero Sasana	0–3	Ratchaburi Mitr Phol	Bangkok
18:00	Arzu (yellow card) 44'; Apichet (yellow card) 45'; Tanaboon (yellow card) 70'; Sarif (yellow card) 84'; Pisan (yellow card) 85'; Apiwat (red card) 88'		22' Obregón; (yellow card) 25' Ukrit; (yellow card) 72' Chutipol; 79' Cordero; 86' Douglas	Stadium: 72nd Anniversary Stadium; Attendance: 4,319; Referee: Titichai Nuanchan

3 August 2013 20	BEC Tero Sasana	1–1	Bangkok United	Bangkok
18:00	Arzu (yellow card) 12'; Narubadin (yellow card) 19'; Anon 27'; Chanathip (yellow card) 79'		(yellow card) 52' Wittaya; 56' Sompong; (yellow card) 66' Hussein; (yellow card) 79' Panphanpong; (yellow card) 85' Gasmi	Stadium: 72nd Anniversary Stadium; Attendance: 2,544; Referee: Taweechai Supatwan

11 August 2013 21	BEC Tero Sasana	1–1	Suphanburi	Bangkok
18:00	Honny (yellow card) 17'; Decha 80' (o.g.); Peerapat (yellow card) 85'		(yellow card) 79' Decha; 83' Suphot	Stadium: 72nd Anniversary Stadium; Attendance: 5,619; Referee: Niwat Insa-ard

14 August 2013 22	TOT	0–5	BEC Tero Sasana	Bangkok
19:00	Ekkachai (yellow card) 45+2'		32, 52' Lucas; 59, 90, 90+3' Cleiton	Stadium: TOT Stadium Chaeng Watthana; Attendance: 765; Referee: Chaiya Alee Mahapab

18 August 2013 23	Bangkok Glass	2–3	BEC Tero Sasana	Pathum Thani
18:00	Mena (yellow card) 15'; Teeratep 19' (PG) (yellow card) 90+3'; Pakin 37' (yellow card) 88'; Michelini (yellow card) 90+3'		(yellow card) 15' Apichet; 33' (yellow card) 90+3' Chanathip; 45+3, 71' (yellow card) 75' Cleiton; (yellow card) 79' Shimoji; (yellow card) 90' Wichaya	Stadium: LEO Stadium; Attendance: 7401; Referee: Thaweep Inkeaw

21 August 2013 24	BEC Tero Sasana	2–4	Chainat Hornbill	Bangkok
18:30	Power 45+2' (o.g.); Pisan (yellow card) 90+4'		(yellow card) 43' Power; 60, 61, 90+4' Yannick; 63' Ratchapol	Stadium: 72nd Anniversary Stadium; Attendance: 2,122; Referee: Praphot Ditsomsri

24 August 2013 25	Sisaket	v	BEC Tero Sasana	Sisaket
18:00				Stadium: Sri Nakhon Lamduan Stadium

31 August 2013 26	BEC Tero Sasana	2–0	Songkhla United	Bangkok
18:00	Koné 20' (o.g.); Honny (yellow card) 33'; Shimoji 85'		(yellow card) 10' Athibordee; 45+1' Rakočević	Stadium: 72nd Anniversary Stadium; Attendance: 2,579; Referee: Praphot Ditsomsri

7 September 2013 27	Pattaya United	2–1	BEC Tero Sasana	Chonburi
18:00	Rangsarith (yellow card) 40'; Obinna (yellow card) 49' (goal) 90'; Dyachenko 54'; Bong-Jun (yellow card) 90+5'		(yellow card) 34' Drogbele; (yellow card) 44' Wichaya; 66' Lucas	Stadium: Nong Prue Stadium; Attendance: 1,740; Referee: Sumate Saiwaew

14 September 2013 28	Buriram United	2–0	BEC Tero Sasana	Buriram
18:00	Adisak 10'; Theerathon 75'		(yellow card) 90+2' Lucas	Stadium: New I-Mobile Stadium; Attendance: 16,269; Referee: Praphot Ditsomsri

21 September 2013 29	BEC Tero Sasana	2–4	Chiangrai United	Bangkok
18:00	Apichet (yellow card) 24'; Narubadin (yellow card) 39'; Cleiton 48, 56'; Kasongo (yellow card) 67'; Anon (yellow card) 90+3'		7' (yellow card) 28' Nix; 9' (yellow card) 67' Léonardo; (yellow card) 37' Thanongsak; 70' Nurul; 81' Choklap	Stadium: 72nd Anniversary Stadium; Attendance: 3,159; Referee: Anuwat Feemuechang

29 September 2013 30	Police United	1–2	BEC Tero Sasana	Bangkok
18:30	Sompob (yellow card) 70'; Pedrinho 90+2'		(yellow card) 31' (goal) 90+1' Rangsan; (yellow card) 78' Honny; (yellow card) 90+3' Chanathip	Stadium: Thammasat Stadium; Attendance: 3,127; Referee: Sivakorn Pu-udom

6 October 2013 31	BEC Tero Sasana	1–2	Samut Songkhram	Bangkok
18:00	Cleiton 16'; Apiwat (yellow card) 45+1'; Wichaya (yellow card) 79'; Honny (yellow card) 82'		42' Hubert; 60' Phuvanart	Stadium: Thammasat Stadium; Attendance: 652; Referee: Mongkolchai Pechsri

19 October 2013 32	Osotspa Saraburi	2–4	BEC Tero Sasana	Saraburi
18:00	Apipoo (yellow card) 17'; Moura-Komenan 31'; Kabfah 61'		(yellow card) 30' (goal) 53,86' Wichaya; (yellow card) 39' Kasongo; (yellow card) 55' Honny 63,80' Cleiton	Stadium: Saraburi Stadium; Attendance: 2,063; Referee: Sivakorn Pu-udom

27 October 2013 33	BEC Tero Sasana	2–2	Muangthong United	Bangkok
18:00	Rangsan (yellow card) 37'; Honny (yellow card) 45+1'; Wichaya 53'; Chanathip 67'; Cleiton (yellow card) 85'; Anon (yellow card) 88'; Amorn (yellow card) 89'		24' Teerasil; 72' Gjurovski; (yellow card) 90+2' Yoo-jin	Stadium: 72nd Anniversary Stadium; Attendance: 5,341; Referee: Amnaj Pongmanee

3 November 2013 34	BEC Tero Sasana	4–1	Army United	Bangkok
18:00	Wichaya (yellow card) 31'; Rangsan 33'; Kasongo 52'; Cleiton 62,65'; Lucas (yellow card) 90+1'		(yellow card) 32' Chaiwat; (yellow card) 45+2' Anurak; 68' Aron	Stadium: 72nd Anniversary Stadium; Attendance: 2,470; Referee: Alongkorn Feemuechang
