= 2015 BEC Tero Sasana F.C. season =

BEC Tero Sasana
2015 season
- Chairman: Brian L.Marcar
- Manager: Manuel Cajuda
- Stadium: 72-years Anniversary Stadium
- Thai Premier League: 16th
- Thai FA Cup: Round of 64
- Thai League Cup: Round of 16
- Top goalscorer: League: Adisak Kraisorn (6); All: Adisak Kraisorn (6)
Home colours	Away colours	Third colours

The 2015 season was BEC Tero Sasana's 19th season in the Thai Premier League.

== Pre-season and friendlies ==
Date	Opponents	H / A	Result F–A	Scorers
10 January 2015	Samut Songkhram	H	0–2	
16 January 2015	Bangkok	H	2–0	
5 September 2015	Air Force	A	2-3	Adisak 40', Nwokolo ', Bošković '

== Toyota Premier Cup ==
BEC Tero Sasana will be playing against Sagan Tosu in the 2015 Toyota Premier Cup. BEC Tero Sasana won the 2015 Toyota Premier Cup 4-3 from a penalty shootout.

Date	Opponents	H / A	Result F–A	Scorers
22 February 2014	Sagan Tosu	N	0–0 (4–3p)	

== Thai Premier League ==
Pos	Team	Pld	W	D	L	GF	GA	GD	Pts	Qualification or relegation
14	Saraburi	34	8	11	15	41	56	−15	35	Club resigned and folded
15	Navy	34	10	5	19	42	65	−23	35	
16	BEC Tero Sasana	34	7	14	13	42	51	−9	35	
17	Port (R)	34	10	3	21	31	49	−18	33	Relegation to the 2016 Thai Division 1 League
18	TOT (R)	34	3	7	24	25	71	−46	16	Relegation to the 2016 Thai Division 1 League

Updated to match(es) played on 13 December 2015. Source: Thai Premier League
Rules for classification: 1) points; 2) head-to-head points; 3) head-to-head goal difference; 4) goal difference; 5) number of goals scored
(R) Relegated

Date	Opponents	H / A	Result F–A	Scorers
14 February 2015	Chiangrai United	H	1-1	Jaturong 82'
18 February 2015	Sisaket	A	2-0	
28 February 2015	Port MTI	H	2-0	Chitchanok 10', Adisak 39'
8 March 2015	Chonburi	A	2–2; Highlight	Bošković (2) 12', 78'
11 March 2015	Navy	H	0-0	
4 April 2015	Bangkok United	A	3-1	Rangsan 40'
25 April 2015	TOT	H	2-0	Adisak 13', Rangsan 52'
29 April 2015	Osotspa M-150	A	2-3	Chanathip 27', Adisak (2) 52', 89'
2 May 2015	Army United	H	0-2	
9 May 2015	Ratchaburi Mitr Phol	A	1-0	
20 June 2015	Chainat Hornbill	H	1-1	Koomson 83'
28 June 2015	Nakhon Ratchasima Mazda	A	1-0	
4 July 2015	Bangkok Glass	A	5–0; Highlight	
11 July 2015	Suphanburi	H	1–0; Highlight	
15 July 2015	Saraburi	A	2-1	Tristan 40'
18 July 2015	Muangthong United	H	1–1; Highlight	Peerapat 22'
26 July 2015	Buriram United	A	3–3; Highlight	Teeraphol YoryoeiTeeraphol 54', Peerapat 62', Adisak 75'
2 August 2015	Sisaket	H	1-1	Fodé Diakité 80'
9 August 2015	Port MTI	A	2-1	Gorbushin 45'
16 August 2015	Chonburi	H	2–1; Highlight	Bošković 6'
19 August 2015	Navy	A	2-2	Peerapat 44', Adisak 53'
12 September 2015	TOT	A	1-2	Chanathip 20', Adisak 56'
19 September 2015	Osotspa Samut Prakan	H	1-1	Adisak 65'
27 September 2015	Army United	A	1-1	Ekkachai 32'
18 October 2015	Ratchaburi Mitr Phol	H	4-1	Ekkachai 1', Fodé Diakité 60', Wichan 82', Adisak 85'
25 October 2015	Chainat Hornbill	A	1-1	Nwokolo 49'
28 October 2015	Nakhon Ratchasima Mazda	H	1-2	Nwokolo 16'
1 November 2015	Bangkok Glass	H	1–1; Highlight	Rangsan 50'
15 November 2015	Bangkok United	H	0-1	
22 November 2015	Suphanburi	A	5–0; Highlight	
29 November 2015	Saraburi	H	1-1	Nwokolo 51'
6 December 2015	Muangthong United	A	1–2; Highlight	Fodé Diakité 60'(pen.), Wichan 70'
9 December 2015	Buriram United	H	1–1; Highlight	Adisak 33'
13 December 2015	Chiangrai United	A	0-5	Teeraphol 22', Fodé Diakité 40', Ekkachai 79', Nwokolo (2) 87' 90'

== Thai FA Cup ==
Chang FA Cup

Date	Opponents	H / A	Result F–A	Scorers	Round
24 June 2015	Police United	H	2–2 (2–4p)	Chenrop 102', Fodé Diakité 105'	Round of 64

== Thai League Cup ==
Toyota League Cup

Date	Opponents	H / A	Result F–A	Scorers	Round
18 April 2015	Phichit	A	0-3	Bošković 45', Fodé Diakité 55', Adisak 77'	Round of 64
1 July 2015	Customs United	A	1-2	Peerapat 8', Bošković 21'	Round of 32
22 July 2015	Lamphun Warrior	A	1–1 (4–2p)	Nwokolo 88'	Round of 16

== Squad statistics ==
No.	Pos.	Name	League		FA Cup		League Cup		Total		Discipline	
No.	Pos.	Name	Apps	Goals	Apps	Goals	Apps	Goals	Apps	Goals	Yellow card	Red card
1	GK	(Thailand) Somporn Yos	0	0	1	0	1	0	0	0	0	0
2	DF	(Thailand) Peerapat Notechaiya	0	0	1	0	0	0	0	0	0	0
3	MF	(Thailand) Wichan Nantasri	0	0	0	0	0	0	0	0	0	0
4	DF	(Thailand) Adisak Sensom-Eiad	0	0	0	0	0	0	0	0	0	0
5	DF	(Thailand) Adisorn Promrak	0	0	1	0	0	0	0	0	0	0
7	MF	(Thailand) Rangsan Viwatchaichok (c)	0	0	1	0	0	0	0	0	0	0
8	MF	(Thailand) Tanaboon Kesarat	0	0	1	0	1	0	0	0	0	0
9	FW	(Thailand) Adisak Kraisorn	0	0	1	0	1	0	0	0	0	0
10	FW	(Indonesia) Greg Nwokolo	0	0	0	0	0(1)	1	0	0	0	0
11	DF	(Thailand) Apichet Puttan (vc)	0	0	0(1)	0	1	0	0	0	0	0
14	FW	(Thailand) Jaturong Pimkoon	0	0	0	0	0	0	0	0	0	0
15	DF	(Ivory Coast) Fodé Diakité	0	0	1	1	1	0	0	0	0	0
16	MF	(Ukraine) Dmitriy Gorbushin	0	0	0	0	0	0	0	0	0	0
18	MF	(Thailand) Chanathip Songkrasin	23	2	1	0	1	0	0	0	3	0
19	GK	(Thailand) Todsaporn Sri-reung	0	0	0	0	0	0	0	0	0	0
20	DF	(Thailand) Satid Sri-Uthai	0	0	0	0	0	0	0	0	0	0
21	MF	(Thailand) Teeraphol Yoryoei	0	0	1	0	1	0	0	0	0	0
22	FW	(Montenegro) Ivan Bošković	0	0	0	0	0	0	0	0	0	0
24	MF	(Thailand) Ekkachai Rittipan	0	0	0	0	0	0	0	0	0	0
25	MF	(Thailand) Chayaphat Kitpongsrithada	0	0	0	0	0	0	0	0	0	0
26	MF	(Thailand) Sitthichok Tassanai	0	0	0(1)	0	0	0	0	0	0	0
27	MF	(Thailand) Anon San-Mhard	0	0	0	0	0	0	0	0	0	0
28	GK	(Thailand) Prasit Padungchok	0	0	0	0	0	0	0	0	0	0
29	FW	(Thailand) Chenrop Samphaodi	0	0	1	1	0(1)	0	0	0	0	0
30	GK	(Thailand) Puttipong Promlee	0	0	0	0	0	0	0	0	0	0
33	MF	(Thailand) Pitakpong Kulasuwan	0	0	1	0	1	0	0	0	0	0
36	MF	(Thailand) Pongthep Mulalee	0	0	0	0	0	0	0	0	0	0
39	DF	(Thailand) Tristan Do	0	0	0	0	1	0	0	0	0	0
40	DF	(Thailand) Watsapol Thosantia	0	0	0	0	1	0	0	0	0	0
—	DF	(South Korea) Son Dae-ho	0	0	0	0	0	0	0	0	0	0
—	DF	(Thailand) Tanasak Srisai	0	0	0	0	0	0	0	0	0	0
—	MF	(Thailand) Jirawat Makarom	0	0	0	0	0	0	0	0	0	0
—	MF	(Ghana) Gilbert Koomson	0	0	0(1)	0	1	0	0	0	0	0
—	FW	(Thailand) Chitchanok Xaysensourinthone	0	0	0	0	0	0	0	0	0	0
—	MF	(Serbia) Bojan Beljić	0	0	0	0	0	0	0	0	0	0
—	—	Own goals	–	–	–	–	–	–	–	–	–	–

== Transfers ==
First Thai footballer's market is opening on 6 November 2014 to 28 January 2015.

Second Thai footballer's market is opening on 3 June 2015 to 30 June 2015.

=== In ===
Date	Pos.	Name	From
6 November 2014	FW	(Thailand) Adisak Kraisorn	(Thailand) Buriram United
6 November 2014	DF	(Thailand) Watsapol Thosantia	(Thailand) Sisaket
14 November 2014	DF	(Thailand) Suradej Saotaisong	(Thailand) Port MTI
14 November 2014	MF	(Thailand) Pitakpong Kulasuwan	(Thailand) Khonkaen
16 November 2014	DF	(Thailand) Meedech Sarayuthpisai	(Thailand) Bangkok
19 December 2014	FW	(Lebanon) Soony Saad	(United States) Sporting Kansas City
19 December 2014	DF	(South Korea) Son Dae-ho	(China) Hangzhou Greentown
22 January 2015	DF	(Thailand) Tanasak Srisai	(Thailand) BEC Tero Sasana
29 January 2015	DF	(Ivory Coast) Fodé Diakité	(Thailand) Chonburi
29 January 2015	MF	(Serbia) Bojan Beljić	(Serbia) Donji Srem
5 July 2015	MF	(Thailand) Wichan Nantasri	(Thailand) TOT
22 July 2015	FW	(Indonesia) Greg Nwokolo	(Indonesia) Persija Jakarta
22 July 2015	MF	(Ukraine) Dmitriy Gorbushin	(Belarus) Minsk
22 July 2015	MF	(Thailand) Pongthep Mulalee	(Thailand) Ayutthaya
31 July 2015	DF	(Thailand) Satid Sri-Uthai	(Thailand) Air Force

=== Out ===
Date	Pos.	Name	To
6 November 2014	FW	(Japan) Sho Shimoji	(Thailand) Police United
6 November 2014	DF	(Japan) Daiki Iwamasa	(Japan) Fagiano Okayama
6 November 2014	MF	(Thailand) Naruphol Ar-Romsawa	(Thailand) Buriram United
6 November 2014	DF	(Thailand) Narubadin Weerawatnodom	(Thailand) Buriram United
9 December 2014	FW	(Honduras) Georgie Welcome	(Thailand) Siam Navy
9 December 2014	DF	(Democratic Republic of the Congo) Bukasa Kasonga	Released
20 December 2014	FW	(Montenegro) Radomir Đalović	(Thailand) Bangkok
20 December 2014	DF	(Thailand) Sompob Nilwong	(Thailand) Chainat
20 December 2014	FW	(Thailand) Jirawut Saranan	(Thailand) Chainat
20 December 2014	MF	(Algeria) Otman Djellilahine	Released
20 December 2014	DF	(Thailand) Nukoolkit Krutyai	(Thailand) Buriram United
20 December 2014	DF	(Thailand) Kittiphan Jantatum	(Thailand) Port MTI
4 January 2014	FW	(Thailand) Akkarapol Meesawat	(Thailand) Songkhla
30 March 2015	DF	(South Korea) Son Dae-ho	Released
30 March 2015	MF	(Serbia) Bojan Beljić	Released
21 May 2015	MF	(Thailand) Jirawat Makarom	(Thailand) Port MTI
21 May 2015	DF	(Thailand) Tanasak Srisai	(Thailand) Ubon UMT United
29 May 2015	FW	(Thailand) Chitchanok Xaysensourinthone	(Thailand) Suphanburi

=== Loan in ===
Date from	Date to	Pos.	Name	To
29 January 2015	31 December 2015	DF	(Montenegro) Ivan Bošković	(Thailand) Nakhon Ratchasima
27 July 2015	31 December 2015	MF	(Thailand) Ekkachai Rittipan	(Thailand) BEC Tero Sasana

=== Loan out ===
Date from	Date to	Pos.	Name	To
13 December 2014	31 December 2015	MF	(Thailand) Ekkapoom Potharungroj	(Thailand) Port MTI
4 January 2015	26 July 2015	FW	(Thailand) Anon San-Mhard	(Thailand) Songkhla United
4 January 2015	26 July 2015	DF	(Thailand) Adisak Sensom-Eiad	(Thailand) Bangkok
4 January 2015	31 December 2015	FW	(Lebanon) Soony Saad	(Thailand) BCC Tero
16 January 2015	31 December 2015	DF	(Thailand) Suradej Saotaisong	(Thailand) Port MTI
26 January 2015	31 December 2015	DF	(Thailand) Meedech Sarayuthpisai	(Thailand) Krabi
