= 2014 BEC Tero Sasana F.C. season =

BEC Tero Sasana
2014 season
- Chairman: Brian L.Marcar
- Manager: José Alves Borges
- Stadium: 72-years Anniversary Stadium
- Thai Premier League: 3rd
- Thai FA Cup: Third round
- Thai League Cup: Winners
- Top goalscorer: Sho Shimoji (17)
Home colours	Away colours	Third colours

The 2014 season was BEC Tero Sasana's 18th season in the Thai Premier League.

== Pre-season and friendlies ==
Date	Opponents	H / A	Result F–A	Scorers

== Thai Premier League ==
Pos	Team	Pld	W	D	L	GF	GA	GD	Pts	Qualification or relegation
1	Buriram United (C)	38	23	10	5	69	26	+43	79	2015 AFC Champions League group stage
2	Chonburi	38	21	13	4	62	33	+29	76	2015 AFC Champions League Qualifying play-off (Note: Bangkok Glass, the winners of the 2014 Thai FA Cup also qualify for the play-off of the 2015 AFC Champions League.)
3	BEC Tero Sasana	38	18	14	6	66	41	+25	68	
4	Ratchaburi	38	17	14	7	62	42	+20	65	
5	Muangthong United	38	20	11	7	66	36	+30	62 (Note: Muangthong United and Singhtarua a nine-point deduction following a fight between their fans.)	

Updated to match(es) played on 2 November 2014. Source: Thai Premier League
Rules for classification: 1) points; 2) head-to-head points; 3) head-to-head goal difference; 4) goal difference; 5) number of goals scored
(C) Champions
Notes:

Date	Opponents	H / A	Result F–A	Scorers
23 February 2014	Samut Songkhram	A	0–0	
9 March 2014	Suphanburi	H	4–2	Narubadin 15', Welcome 35', Naruphol 50', Koomson 90'
15 March 2014	Buriram United	H	3–2	Iwamasa 40', Koomson 45', Peerapat 61'
23 March 2014	Chonburi	H	1–1	Iwamasa 50'
26 March 2014	Air Force	A	0–0	
29 March 2014	Muangthong United	H	1–1	Peerapat 71'
6 April 2014	Army United	A	0–1	Rangsan 66'
9 April 2014	Sisaket	H	2–1	Welcome 59', Shimoji 87'
20 April 2014	Osotspa	A	0–0	
27 April 2014	Bangkok United	H	7–0	Rangsan 14', Shimoji 31' 69', Koomson 61' 82', Welcome 74', Naruphol 86'
4 May 2014	Chainat	A	2–3	Rangsan 55', Iwamasa 75', Welcome 87'
10 May 2014	TOT	H	1–1	Welcome 25'
17 May 2014	Police United	A	1–1	Shimoji 67'
28 May 2014	Ratchaburi	A	1–2	Shimoji 48' 57'
1 June 2014	Singhtarua	H	3–1	Welcome 8', Narubadin 35', Rangsan 66'
4 June 2014	Songkhla United	H	2–0	Ekkapoom 4', Shimoji 85'
7 June 2014	Bangkok Glass	H	1–1	Shimoji 20'
14 June 2014	PTT Rayong	A	2–2	Shimoji 45', Rangsan 76'
22 June 2014	Chiangrai United	H	1–1	Chanathip 50'
25 June 2014	Samut Songkhram	H	2–0	Chanathip 47', Shimoji 57'
28 June 2014	Suphanburi	A	2–3	Jaturong 9', Shimoji 60', Naruphol 67'
5 July 2014	Buriram United	A	1–1	Iwamasa 29'
13 July 2014	Chonburi	A	1–0	
20 July 2014	Air Force	H	0–0	
23 July 2014	Muangthong United	A	0–1	Jaturong 77'
27 July 2014	Army United	H	2–1	Koomson 25', Chanathip 60'
3 August 2014	Sisaket	A	3–2	Koomson 62', Welcome 78'
9 August 2014	Osotspa	H	0–0	
13 August 2014	Bangkok United	A	0–0	
16 August 2014	Chainat	H	2–1	Shimoji 36', Welcome 45'
20 August 2014	TOT	A	2–1	Jaturong 81'
24 August 2014	Police United	H	5–2	Jirawat 11' 17', Rangsan 61', Shimoji 69' 90'
15 October 2014	Songkhla United	A	3–4	Djellilahine 16' 22', Rangsan 61', Iwamasa 74'
19 October 2014	Ratchaburi	H	1–2	Shimoji 55'
22 October 2014	Singhtarua	A	1–3	Welcome 14' 88', Shimoji 84'
19 October 2014	Bangkok Glass	A	2–1	Đalović 16'
29 October 2014	PTT Rayong	H	2–1	Đalović 6', Shimoji 17'
2 November 2014	Chiangrai United	A	2–1	Chanathip 27'

== Thai FA Cup ==
Chang FA Cup

Date	Opponents	H / A	Result F–A	Scorers	Round
21 May 2014	Nakhon Ratchasima	H	1–2		Round of 64

== Thai League Cup ==
Toyota League Cup

Date	Opponents	H / A	Result F–A	Scorers	Round
2 Maพch 2014	Phetchaburi	A	0–2		First Round
30 April 2014	Ubon UMT United	A	1–4		Second Round
11 June 2014	Pattaya United	A	0–2		Third Round
18 June 2014	Bangkok Glass	A	0–0		Quarter-finals
2 July 2014	Bangkok Glass	H	1–0		Quarter-finals
18 July 2014	Nakhon Ratchasima	H	1–0		Semi-finals
30 July 2014	Nakhon Ratchasima	A	2–4		Semi-finals
12 October 2014	Buriram United	N	0–2	Iwamasa 76', Welcome 90'	Final

== Squad statistics ==
No.	Pos.	Name	League		FA Cup		League Cup		Total		Discipline	
No.	Pos.	Name	Apps	Goals	Apps	Goals	Apps	Goals	Apps	Goals	Yellow card	Red card
1	GK	(Thailand) Kritsada Nonchai	0	0	0	0	0	0	0	0	0	0
2	DF	(Thailand) Peerapat Notechaiya	34	2	0	0	0	0	0	0	9	0
3	DF	(Democratic Republic of the Congo) Belux Bukasa	11(4)	0	0	0	0	0	0	0	1	0
4	DF	(Thailand) Adisorn Promrak	22(3)	0	0	0	0	0	0	0	5	0
5	DF	(Japan) Daiki Iwamasa	36	5	0	0	0	0	0	0	7	0
6	MF	(Thailand) Jirawat Makarom	2(8)	2	0	0	0	0	0	0	0	0
7	MF	(Thailand) Rangsan Viwatchaichok (c)	34(2)	7	0	0	0	0	0	0	7	0
8	MF	(Thailand) Ekkapoom Potharungroj	4(4)	1	0	0	0	0	0	0	2	0
9	MF	(Thailand) Naruphol Ar-romsawa	12(4)	3	0	0	0	0	0	0	1	0
10	FW	(Montenegro) Radomir Đalović	10(3)	2	0	0	0	0	0	0	0	0
11	DF	(Thailand) Apichet Puttan (vc)	7(6)	0	0	0	0	0	0	0	2	0
13	DF	(Thailand) Narubadin Weerawatnodom	32	2	0	0	0	0	0	0	7	0
14	FW	(Thailand) Jaturong Pimkoon	1(21)	3	0	0	0	0	0	0	3	0
15	DF	(Thailand) Nukoolkit Krutyai	1(1)	0	0	0	0	0	0	0	0	0
16	MF	(Japan) Sho Shimoji	24(5)	17	0	0	0	0	0	0	4	0
17	MF	(Ghana) Gilbert Koomson	24(2)	6	0	0	0	0	0	0	5	1
18	MF	(Thailand) Chanathip Songkrasin	25(2)	4	0	0	0	0	0	0	0	0
19	GK	(Thailand) Todsaporn Sri-reung	36	0	0	0	0	0	0	0	5	0
20	MF	(Thailand) Tanaboon Kesarat	35	0	0	0	0	0	0	0	8	0
21	MF	(Thailand) Senee Kaewnam	0	0	0	0	0	0	0	0	0	0
22	MF	(Algeria) Otman Djellilahine	11(2)	2	0	0	0	0	0	0	2	0
23	MF	(Thailand) Amorn Thammanarm	1	0	0	0	0	0	0	0	0	0
24	DF	(Thailand) Paisarn Sang-arun	1(1)	0	0	0	0	0	0	0	0	0
25	DF	(Thailand) Chayaphat Kitpongsrithada	14(5)	0	0	0	0	0	0	0	0	0
27	FW	(Honduras) Georgie Welcome	23(7)	10	0	0	0	0	0	0	1	1
28	GK	(Thailand) Prasit Padungchok	1	0	0	0	0	0	0	0	0	0
31	MF	(Thailand) Anon San-mhard	2(1)	0	0	0	0	0	0	0	0	0
32	FW	(Thailand) Chitchanok Xaysensourinthone	0(1)	0	0	0	0	0	0	0	0	0
33	DF	(Thailand) Sompob Nilwong	5(8)	0	0	0	0	0	0	0	1	0
39	DF	(Thailand) Tristan Do	1(5)	0	0	0	0	0	0	0	0	0
—	MF	(Guadeloupe) Thomas Gamiette	2(1)	0	0	0	0	0	0	0	0	0
—	WF	(Nigeria) Kelechi Osunwa	2(2)	0	0	0	0	0	0	0	0	0
—	—	Own goals	–	–	–	–	–	–	–	–	–	–

== Transfers ==
=== In ===
Date	Pos.	Name	From
2014	GK	(Thailand) Todsaporn Sri-reung	(Thailand) Army United
2014	DF	(Thailand) Chayaphat Kitpongsrithada	(Thailand) Chonburi
2014	FW	(Thailand) Jirawut Saranan	(Thailand) Trat
2014	DF	(Thailand) Kittiphan Jantatum	(Thailand) Trat
2014	DF	(Thailand) Adisorn Promrak	(Thailand) Army United
2014	GK	(Thailand) Prasit Padungchok	(Thailand) Nakhon Ratchasima
2014	MF	(Thailand) Ekkapoom Potharungroj	(Thailand) Ratchaburi
2014	DF	(Uzbekistan) Aleksandr Merzlyakov	(Turkey) Orduspor
2014	FW	(Nigeria) Kelechi Osunwa	(Sudan) Al-Merrikh
2014	MF	(Guadeloupe) Thomas Gamiette	(France) Tours
2014	GK	(Thailand) Kritsada Nonchai	(Thailand) Chiangmai
2014	DF	(Japan) Daiki Iwamasa	(Japan) Kashima Antlers
2014	MF	(Thailand) Naruphol Ar-Romsawa	(Thailand) Ratchaburi
2014	MF	(Argentina) Maximiliano Laso	(Romania) Olimpia Satu Mare
2014	FW	(Portugal) Ariza Makukula	(Greece) OFI
2014	MF	(Thailand) Senee Kaewnam	(Thailand) Ratchaburi
2014	DF	(Thailand) Paisarn Sang-arun	(Thailand) Royal Thai Air Force
2014	FW	(Honduras) Georgie Welcome	(Honduras) Platense
2014	FW	(Thailand) Chitchanok Xaysensourinthone	(Thailand) Muangthong United
2014	DF	(Thailand) Sompob Nilwong	(Thailand) Police United
2014	MF	(Thailand) Sitthichok Tassanai	(Thailand) Bangkok
2014	FW	(Montenegro) Radomir Đalović	(China) Shanghai Shenxin
2014	FW	(Thailand) Tristan Do	(France) Gazélec Ajaccio
2014	MF	(Thailand) Jirawat Makarom	(Thailand) Buriram United
2014	MF	(Algeria) Otman Djellilahine	(France) US Créteil-Lusitanos

=== Out ===
Date	Pos.	Name	To
2014	FW	(Thailand) Sarif Sainui	(Thailand) Samut Songkhram
2014	DF	(Thailand) Korrakot Wiriyaudomsiri	(Thailand) Chonburi
2014	DF	(Thailand) Apiwat Ngaolamhin	(Thailand) Ratchaburi
2014	FW	(Brazil) Cleiton Silva	(Mexico) Querétaro
2014	FW	(Thailand) Sarayuth Chaikamdee	(Thailand) Sisaket
2014	MF	(Thailand) Sanrawat Dechmitr	(Thailand) Bangkok United
2014	GK	(Thailand) Pisan Dorkmaikaew	(Thailand) Bangkok United
2014	MF	(Thailand) Yai Nilwong	(Thailand) Ratchaburi
2014	FW	(Thailand) Sujin Naknayom	(Thailand) PTT Rayong
2014	FW	(Brazil) Lucas Gaúcho	(Vietnam) Hải Phòng
2014	MF	(Thailand) Peemvit Thongnitiroth	(Thailand) Samut Songkhram
2014	MF	(Argentina) Maximiliano Laso	Released
2014	DF	(Uzbekistan) Aleksandr Merzlyakov	Released
2014	MF	(Thailand) Jetsada Phulek	(Thailand) Suphanburi
2014	GK	(Thailand) Worawut Kaewpook	(Thailand) Bangkok
2014	FW	(Sudan) Kelechi Osunwa	Released
2014	MF	(Guadeloupe) Thomas Gamiette	Released

=== Loan in ===
Date from	Date to	Pos.	Name	To

=== Loan out ===
Date	Pos.	Name	To
2014	MF	(Thailand) Akkarapol Meesawat	(Thailand) Roi Et United
2014	GK	(Thailand) Somporn Yos	(Thailand) Phitsanulok
2014	DF	(Thailand) Thanakorn Saipunya	(Thailand) Samut Songkhram
2014	MF	(Thailand) Amorn Thammanarm	(Thailand) PTT Rayong
2014	FW	(Thailand) Chitchanok Xaysensourinthone	(Thailand) PTT Rayong
