= 2016 Buriram United F.C. season =

Buriram United
2016 season
- Chairman: Newin Chidchob
- Manager: Alexandre Gama (until 22 May 2016); Afshin Ghotbi (24 May – 20 August); Ranko Popović (from 25 August 2016)
- Stadium: I-Mobile Stadium
- Thai League: 4th
- Thai FA Cup: Round of 16
- Thai League Cup: Winners (Title Shared)
- Kor Royal Cup: Winners
- AFC Champions League: Group stage
- Top goalscorer: League: Diogo (11); All: Andrés Túñez (19)
- Highest home attendance: 32,600; Buriram United 3–2 Chonburi (Thai League) (15 April 2016)
- Lowest home attendance: 3,832; Buriram United 0–0 Shandong Luneng Taishan (AFC Champions League) (4 May 2016)
- Average home league attendance: 15,432
Home colours	Away colours	Third colours

The 2016 season was Buriram United's 5th season in the Thai Premier League. The club entered the season as the Thai Premier League Champion, and would participate in the Thai League, FA Cup, League Cup, Kor Royal Cup, Toyota Premier Cup and the AFC Champions League.

== Players ==
=== First team squad ===
As of 1 January 2017

Squad No.	Name	Nationality	Position(s)	Date of birth (age)
Goalkeepers
1	Siwarak Tedsungnoen	(Thailand)	GK	20 April 1984 (age 41)
33	Chinnapong Raksri	(Thailand)	GK	—N/a
38	Kwanchai Suklom	(Thailand)	GK	—N/a
Defenders
5	Andrés Túñez	(Venezuela)	DF	15 March 1987 (age 38)
11	Korrakot Wiriyaudomsiri	(Thailand)	DF	19 March 1988 (age 37)
13	Narubadin Weerawatnodom	(Thailand)	DF	12 July 1994 (age 31)
14	Chitipat Tanklang	(Thailand)	DF	11 August 1991 (age 34)
16	Koravit Namwiset	(Thailand)	DF	2 August 1986 (age 39)
17	Anawin Jujeen	(Thailand)	DF	13 March 1987 (age 38)
25	Suree Sukha	(Thailand)	DF	27 July 1982 (age 43)
30	Sakeereen Teekasom	(Thailand)	DF	27 February 1990 (age 35)
31	Abdulhafiz Bueraheng	(Thailand)	DF	17 October 1995 (age 30)
37	Adisak Sensom-Eiad	(Thailand)	DF	11 December 1994 (age 31)
Midfielders
6	Kanu	(Brazil)	MF	23 September 1987 (age 38)
7	Go Seul-ki	(South Korea)	MF	21 April 1986 (age 39)
8	Suchao Nuchnum	(Thailand)	MF	17 May 1983 (age 42)
10	Jakkaphan Kaewprom	(Thailand)	MF	24 May 1988 (age 37)
15	Surat Sukha	(Thailand)	MF	27 July 1982 (age 43)
19	Supachok Sarachat	(Thailand)	MF	22 May 1998 (age 27)
21	Chitpanya Tisud	(Thailand)	MF	4 October 1991 (age 34)
23	Alexander Sieghart	(Thailand) (Germany)	MF	29 July 1994 (age 31)
24	Baramee Limwattana	(Thailand)	MF	4 January 1996 (age 30)
28	Chaowat Veerachat	(Thailand)	MF	23 June 1996 (age 29)
Strikers
9	Bruno Moreira	(Portugal)	FW	6 September 1987 (age 38)
18	Sittichok Kannoo	(Thailand)	FW	9 August 1996 (age 29)
20	Kaio Felipe Gonçalves	(Brazil)	FW	6 July 1987 (age 38)
26	Ratthanakorn Maikami	(Thailand)	FW	—N/a
34	Anon Amornlerdsak	(Thailand)	FW	6 November 1997 (age 28)
39	Anan Buasang	(Thailand)	FW	30 September 1992 (age 33)
40	Diogo Luís Santo	(Brazil)	FW	26 May 1987 (age 38)

=== Appearances and goals ===
No.	Pos.	Name	League	FA Cup	League Cup	ACL	Other	Total
1	GK	(Thailand) Siwarak Tedsungnoen (tc)	26	0	0	5	0	0
2	DF	(Thailand) Theerathon Bunmathan	0	0	0	0	0	1
3	DF	(Thailand) Sathaporn Daengsee	0	0	0	0	0	0
4	MF	(Thailand) Adul Lahsoh	0	0	0	0	0	0
5	DF	(Venezuela) Andrés Túñez (vc)	9	0	3	1	1	12
7	MF	(South Korea) Ko Seul-Ki	3	0	0	0	2	5
8	MF	(Thailand) Suchao Nutnum (c)	1	0	0	0	0	1
9	FW	(Brazil) Weslley Smith Alves Feitosa	0	0	2	0	0	2
10	MF	(Thailand) Jakkraphan Kaewprom	0	0	0	0	1	1
13	DF	(Thailand) Narubadin Weerawatnodom	0	0	0	0	0	0
14	DF	(Thailand) Chitipat Thanklang	0	0	0	0	0	0
15	MF	(Thailand) Surat Sukha	0	0	0	0	0	0
16	DF	(Thailand) Koravit Namwiset	0	0	0	0	0	0
17	MF	(Thailand) Anawin Jujeen	0	0	0	0	0	0
18	FW	(Thailand) Sittichok Kannoo	1	0	0	0	0	1
19	MF	(Thailand) Supachok Sarachat	1	0	0	0	0	1
20	FW	(Brazil) Kaio Felipe Gonçalves	1	0	5	0	0	6
22	MF	(South Korea) Kim Seung-yong	2	0	3	0	0	5
24	DF	(Thailand) Nukoolkit Krutyai	0	0	0	0	0	0
25	DF	(Thailand) Suree Sukha	0	0	0	0	0	0
27	DF	(Thailand) Nattapon Malapun	0	0	0	0	0	0
28	MF	(Thailand) Chaowat Veerachat	0	0	0	0	0	0
29	GK	(Thailand) Yotsapon Teangdar	0	0	0	0	0	0
34	MF	(Thailand) Anon Amornlerdsak	2	0	0	0	0	2
39	FW	(Thailand) Anan Buasang	0	0	1	0	0	1
40	FW	(Brazil) Diogo Luís Santo	8	0	0	0	1	1

=== Transfers ===
First Thai footballer's market is opening on 27 December 2015, to 28 January 2016,

Second Thai footballer's market is opening on 3 June 2016, to 30 June 2016

==== Transfers in ====
No.	Pos	Player	Transferred From	Fee	Date	Source
1st leg
—	FW	(Uruguay) Emiliano Alfaro	(Italy) Lazio	?	30 November 2015	
—	MF	(Thailand) Adul Lahsoh	(Thailand) Chonburi	?	6 December 2015	
—	MF	(Brazil) André Moritz	(South Korea) Pohang Steelers	?	6 December 2015	
—	DF	(Thailand) Sathaporn Daengsee	(Thailand) Nakhon Ratchasima	?	31 December 2015	
39	MF	(Thailand) Anan Buasang	(Thailand) Bangkok Glass	?	31 December 2015	
—	FW	(Brazil) Danilo	(Kazakhstan) FC Aktobe	?	31 December 2015	
20	FW	(Brazil) Kaio	(South Korea) Suwon Samsung Bluewings	?	27 January 2016	
—	DF	(Thailand) Nattapon Malapun	(Thailand) Police United	?	11 February 2016	
—	MF	(South Korea) Kim Seung-yong	(China) Qingdao Huanghai	?	22 February 2016	
—	FW	(Brazil) Weslley	(South Korea) Busan IPark	?	3 March 2016	
2nd leg
31	DF	(Thailand) Abdulhafiz Bueraheng	(Thailand) Nara United	?	1 June 2016	
9	FW	(Portugal) Bruno Moreira	(Portugal) Paços de Ferreira	?	9 June 2016	
30	DF	(Thailand) Sakeerin Teekasom	(Thailand) Chiangrai United	?	9 June 2016	
37	DF	(Thailand) Adisak Sensom-Eiad	(Thailand) Ubon UMT United	?	9 June 2016	
21	MF	(Thailand) Jitpanya Tisut	(Thailand) Chainat Hornbill	?	9 June 2016	
33	GK	(Thailand) Chinnapong Raksri	(Thailand) Inter Pattaya	?	9 June 2016	
6	MF	(Brazil) Kanu	(Russia) Terek Grozny	?	11 June 2016	
23	MF	(Thailand) Alexander Sieghart	(Germany) SpVgg Unterhaching	?	14 June 2016	
11	DF	(Thailand) Korrakot Wiriyaudomsiri	(Thailand) Chonburi	?	18 June 2016	

==== Transfers out ====
Date	Pos.	Name	To
29 September 2015	FW	(Brazil) Rafael Coelho	(India) FC Goa
4 December 2015	FW	(Brazil) Jandson	(Saudi Arabia) Al Qadisiyah
18 December 2015	FW	(Thailand) Santirad Weing-in	(Thailand) PTT Rayong
22 December 2015	FW	(Thailand) Nattawut Sombatyotha	(Thailand) Ratchaburi Mitr Phol
22 December 2015	MF	(Thailand) Sansern Limwattana	(Thailand) Bangkok United
22 December 2015	MF	(Thailand) Wanchalerm Yingyong	(Thailand) Chainat Hornbill
25 December 2015	DF	(Thailand) Tanakorn Niyomwan	(Thailand) PTT Rayong
25 December 2015	DF	(Thailand) Kongphop Luadsong	(Thailand) PTT Rayong
25 December 2015	FW	(Thailand) Amares Amornlerdsak	(Thailand) PTT Rayong
26 December 2015	FW	(Brazil) Gilberto Macena	(Saudi Arabia) Al Qadisiyah
31 December 2015	DF	(Spain) David Rochela	(Thailand) Port
31 December 2015	MF	(Thailand) Nitipong Selanon	(Thailand) Port
31 December 2015	FW	(New Zealand) Kayne Vincent	(Malaysia) Perlis
4 January 2016	DF	(Thailand) Itthiporn Theprian	(Thailand) Songkhla United
31 December 2015	FW	(Uruguay) Emiliano Alfaro	(India) NorthEast United FC
31 January 2016	FW	(Brazil) Danilo	(Thailand) Chiangrai United
23 February 2016	MF	(Brazil) André Moritz	(Turkey) Denizlispor
13 May 2016	DF	(Thailand) Theerathon Bunmathan	(Thailand) SCG Muangthong United
1 June 2016	DF	(Thailand) Nukoolkit Krutyai	(Thailand) Ubon UMT United
19 June 2016	MF	(Thailand) Prakit Deeprom	(Thailand) Chonburi
24 June 2016	GK	(Thailand) Yotsapon Teangdar	(Thailand) Khon Kaen United

==== Loans out ====
Date from	Date to	Pos.	Name	To
23 December 2015	17 June 2016	DF	(Thailand) Patipan Un-Op	(Thailand) Navy
23 December 2015	31 December 2016	FW	(Thailand) Arthit Boodjinda	(Thailand) Chainat Hornbill
26 December 2015	19 June 2016	MF	(Thailand) Prakit Deeprom	(Thailand) Chonburi
26 December 2015	31 December 2016	MF	(Thailand) Naruphol Ar-Romsawa	(Thailand) Chonburi
26 January 2016	31 December 2016	MF	(Cameroon) Isaac Mbengan	(Thailand) Krabi
29 January 2016	1 July 2016	MF	(Thailand) Baramee Limwattana	(Thailand) Songkhla United
29 January 2016	31 December 2016	MF	(Thailand) Ponlawat Changtham	(Thailand) Songkhla United
7 February 2016	31 December 2016	FW	(Bhutan) Chencho Gyeltshen	(Thailand) Nonthaburi
7 February 2016	31 December 2016	MF	(Thailand) Chatchon Jairangsee	(Thailand) Nonthaburi
7 February 2016	31 December 2016	MF	(Thailand) Narongchai Singtam	(Thailand) Nonthaburi
7 February 2016	31 December 2016	MF	(Thailand) Paramin Sailuadkam	(Thailand) Nonthaburi
9 June 2016	31 December 2016	MF	(Thailand) Adul Lahsoh	(Thailand) Chonburi
17 June 2016	31 December 2016	DF	(Thailand) Patipan Un-Op	(Thailand) Suphanburi
18 June 2016	31 December 2016	FW	(Brazil) Weslley	(Japan) Shonan Bellmare
24 June 2016	31 December 2016	MF	(South Korea) Kim Seung-yong	(Thailand) Suphanburi
1 July 2016	31 December 2016	DF	(Thailand) Nattapon Malapun	(Thailand) Chonburi
14 July 2016	31 December 2016	DF	(Thailand) Sathaporn Daengsee	(Thailand) Port

=== Foreign players ===
Note: Flags indicate national team as defined under FIFA eligibility rules; some limited exceptions apply. Players may hold more than one non-FIFA nationality.

No.	Pos.	Nation	Player
5	DF	VEN	Andrés Túñez
7	MF	KOR	Ko Seul-ki
9	FW	BRA	Weslley
20	FW	BRA	Kaio
22	MF	KOR	Kim Seung-yong
40	FW	BRA	Diogo

== Kit ==
Supplier: Buriram United Football Club / Sponsor: Chang

Home	Away	Third

== Non-competitive ==
=== Pre-season Asian Tour ===
Win Draw Loss

23 January 2016 Friendly	Cambodian League All Stars (Cambodia)	2–2 (6−5 p)	Buriram United	Phnom Penh, Cambodia
18:30 (UTC+7)	MonyUdom 67'; Vathanaka 90'		Suchao 45+2'; Diogo 80'	Stadium: Olympic Stadium

27 January 2016 Friendly	Buriram United	2–1	(South Korea) Pohang Steelers	Buriram, Thailand
18:30 (UTC+7)	Moritz 10'; Danilo 33'		Won-jin 59'	Stadium: New I-Mobile Stadium

31 January 2016 Friendly	Lao Premier League All Stars (Laos)	1–3	Buriram United	Vientiane, Laos
18:30 (UTC+7)	Honma 46'		Moritz 1', 30'; Túñez 24' (pen.)	Stadium: Laos National Stadium

=== Friendly matches ===
Win Draw Loss

7 February 2016 Friendly	Krabi	1–5	Buriram United	Krabi, Thailand
18:00 (UTC+7)	Mbengan 80'		Diogo 33', 55'; Jakkaphan 66'; Sathaporn 77'; Koravit 84'	Stadium: Krabi Provincial Stadium

23 March 2016 Friendly	Buriram United	6–0	Bhutan	Buriram, Thailand
17:30 (UTC+7)	Túñez, Weslley, Supachok; Bhutan player (o.g.)			Stadium: Khao Kradong Stadium

25 March 2016 Friendly	Buriram United	9–0	Bhutan	Buriram, Thailand
17:30 (UTC+7)	Kaio,,, Weslley,, Nukoolkit, Seung-yong			Stadium: New I-Mobile Stadium

1 June 2016 Friendly	Nara United	0–4	Buriram United	Narathiwat, Thailand
16:30 (UTC+7)			Weslley 24', 37'; Supachok 68'; Kaio 88'	Stadium: Narathiwat Provincial Administrative Organization Stadium; Attendance: 30,000

31 August 2016 Friendly	Ranong United	0–1	Buriram United	Ranong, Thailand
18:00 (UTC+7)			Ranong United Player 62' (o.g.)	Stadium: Ranong Province Stadium

3 September 2016 Friendly	Prachuap	2–3	Buriram United	Prachuap Khiri Khan, Thailand
18:00 (UTC+7)	Wanit 29'; Nascimento 58'		Bruno 13', 54'; Túñez 27'	Stadium: Sam Ao Stadium

3 October 2016 Friendly	Buriram United	1–1	Ang Thong	Buriram, Thailand
18:00 (UTC+7)				Stadium: New I-Mobile Stadium

9 October 2016 Friendly	Buriram United	2–0	Ubon UMT United	Buriram, Thailand
18:00 (UTC+7)				Stadium: New I-Mobile Stadium

== Competitions ==
=== Overall ===
Competition	Started round	Final position / round	First match	Last match
Thai League	Matchday 1	4th	6 March 2016	17 September 2016
FA Cup	Round of 64	Round of 16	15 June 2016	3 August 2016
League Cup	Round of 64	Winner; Shared title	10 April 2016	14 September 2016
Kor Royal Cup	Final	Winner	20 February 2016	
Premier Cup	Final	Winner	13 February 2016	
Champions League	Group stage	Group stage	23 February 2016	4 May 2016

Updated to match played 14 October 2016
Source: Competitions

=== Overview ===
Competition	Record							
Competition	G	W	D	L	GF	GA	GD	Win %
League	30	15	10	5	55	38	+17	50.00
FA Cup	3	2	0	1	14	3	+11	66.67
League Cup	6	4	2	0	22	5	+17	66.67
Kor Royal Cup	1	1	0	0	3	1	+2	100.00
Premier Cup	1	1	0	0	2	1	+1	100.00
Champions League	6	0	1	5	1	16	−15	0.00
Total	47	23	13	11	97	64	+33	48.94

Updated to match played 14 October 2016
Source: Competitions

=== Toyota Premier Cup ===
Win Draw Loss

13 February 2016 Final	Buriram United (Thailand)	2–1	(Japan) Albirex Niigata	Buriram
18:30 (UTC+7)	Seul-ki 60', 79'	Report	Silva 55'	Stadium: New I-Mobile Stadium

=== Kor Royal Cup ===
Win Draw Loss

20 February 2016 Final	Buriram United	3–1	Muangthong United	Pathum Wan, Bangkok
18:30 (UTC+7)	Diogo 14'; Túñez 69' (pen.); Jakkraphan 83'	Report	Adisak 78'	Stadium: Suphachalasai Stadium; Referee: Thitichai Nuanchan

=== Toyota Thai League ===
==== League table ====
Pos	Team	Pld	W	D	L	GF	GA	GD	Pts	Qualification or relegation
2	Bangkok United (Q)	31	23	6	2	71	36	+35	75	2017 AFC Champions League preliminary round 2
3	Bangkok Glass	31	18	3	10	62	41	+21	57	
4	Buriram United	30	15	10	5	55	38	+17	55	
5	Chonburi	31	14	9	8	52	33	+19	51	
6	Ratchaburi Mitr Phol	30	14	7	9	52	35	+17	49	

Updated to match(es) played on 25 September 2016. Source: Thai League
Rules for classification: 1) points; 2) goal difference; 3) number of goals scored.
(Q) Qualified for the phase indicated

==== Results summary ====
Overall								Home						Away					
Pld	W	D	L	GF	GA	GD	Pts	W	D	L	GF	GA	GD	W	D	L	GF	GA	GD
30	15	10	5	55	38	+17	55	8	5	3	28	19	+9	7	5	2	27	19	+8

==== Results by matchday ====
Matchday	1	2	3	4	5	6	7	8	9	10	11	12	13	14	15	16	17	18	19	20	21	22	23	24	25	26	27	28	29	30	31	32	33	34
Ground	A	H	A	H	A	H	A	H	A	H	A	H	A	H	H	H	A	H	A	H	A	H	H	A	H	A	H	A	H	A	A	H	A	A
Result	W	W	D	D	W	W	W	L	W	D	D	L	W	W	L	D	D	D	D	W	W	W	W	L	W	D	D	W	W	L	P	P	P	P
Position	2	2	2	3	2	2	1	4	4	4	4	5	3	3	4	5	4	4	6	5	5	4	4	4	4	4	4	3	3	3	4	4	4	4

Updated to match(es) played on 14 October 2016. Source: Thaipremierleague.co.th
A = Away; H = Home; W = Win; D = Draw; L = Loss; P = Postponed

==== Score overview ====
Win Draw Loss Cancelled

Opposition	Home score	Away score	Agg. score	Double
Army United	0–1	2–1	2–2	No
Bangkok Glass	2–1	2–0	4–1	Yes
Bangkok United	0–0	5–3	5–3	No
BBCU	4–0	2–0	6–0	Yes
BEC Tero Sasana	3–3	A–A	3–3	No
Chainat Hornbill	0–0	4–4	4–4	No
Chiangrai United	2–1	0–0	2–1	No
Chonburi	3–2	A–A	3–2	No
Muangthong United	0–3	2–3	2–6	No
Nakhon Ratchasima	1–0	0–2	1–2	No
Navy	1–0	0–0	1–0	No
Pattaya United	4–2	3–1	7–3	Yes
Ratchaburi	0–1	A–A	0–1	No
Sisaket	A–A	2–2	2–2	No
Sukhothai	5–2	1–0	6–2	Yes
Super Power	1–1	2–2	3–3	No
Suphanburi	2–2	2–1	4–3	No

Note: Buriram United goals are listed first.

==== Matches ====
Win Draw Loss Cancelled

6 March 2016 1	Bangkok United	3–5	Buriram United	Pathum Thani
18:00 (UTC+7)	Dragan 25', 67', 77' (pen.), (yellow card) 73'; Teeratep (yellow card) 70'	Report	Túñez 18', 30' (pen.), 70', (yellow card) 78'; Seul-ki 42', (yellow card) 70'; Narubadin (yellow card) 46'; Seung-yong 53'; Adul (red card) 88'; Koravit (yellow card) 59'	Stadium: Thammasat Stadium; Attendance: 9,297; Referee: Sivakorn Pu-udom

9 March 2016 2	Buriram United	1–0	Navy	Buriram
19:00 (UTC+7)	Chaowat (yellow card) 29'; Túñez 83' (pen.)	Report	Marut (yellow card) 81'; Victor (yellow card) 81'	Stadium: New I-Mobile Stadium; Attendance: 9,771; Referee: Suprem Nonthawong

12 March 2016 3	Chiangrai United	0–0	Buriram United	Chiang Rai
18:00 (UTC+7)	Piyaphon (yellow card) 53'; Kazuki (yellow card) 79'; Dennis (yellow card) 84'	Report	Kaio (yellow card) 22'; Túñez (yellow card) 37'	Stadium: United Stadium; Attendance: 15,550; Referee: Nitipoom Kullabutr

30 March 2016 4	Buriram United	2–2	Suphanburi	Buriram
18:00 (UTC+7)	Theerathon 40', (yellow card) 86'; Suchao (yellow card) 43'; Siwarak (yellow card) 68'; Anon 78'	Report	Guilherme (yellow card) 36'; Prat (yellow card) 48', (goal) 54'; Jakkapan 70' (pen.); Luiz (yellow card) 70'; Sakolwat (red card) 90+4'; Carmelo (yellow card) 83'	Stadium: New I-Mobile Stadium; Attendance: 12,632; Referee: Manop Parnsakorn

2 April 2016 5	Pattaya United	1–3	Buriram United	Chon Buri
18:00 (UTC+7)	Wongsakorn 18'	Report	Túñez 34'; Kaio 46'; Anon 90+4'	Stadium: Nong Prue Stadium; Referee: Mongkolchai Pechsri

15 April 2016 6	Buriram United	3–2	Chonburi	Buriram
18:00 (UTC+7)	Suchao 31'; Túñez 50'; Seung-yong 90+5'	Report	Assumpção 64'; Careca 80'	Stadium: New I-Mobile Stadium; Attendance: 32,600

23 April 2016 7	Sukhothai	0–1	Buriram United	Lak Si, Bangkok (Note: Sukhothai played their home matches at TOT Stadium in Bangkok due to the ban of Thung Thalay Luang Stadium.)
18:00 (UTC+7)	Lursan (yellow card) 85'	Report	Anawin 25', (yellow card) 59'; Seul-ki (yellow card) 29'; Narubadin (yellow card) 84'; Theerathon (yellow card) 86'	Stadium: TOT Stadium; Attendance: 4,163; Referee: A-khom Charoensuk

27 April 2016 8	Buriram United	0–3	Muangthong United	Buriram
19:00 (UTC+7)	Weslley (yellow card) 53' (yellow-red card) 90+2'; Suchao (yellow card) 54'; Túñez (yellow card) 84'	Report	Cleiton 9', 38', (yellow card) 53'; Adisak 17'; Mario (yellow card) 89'	Stadium: New I-Mobile Stadium; Attendance: 32,391; Referee: Chairurk Ngamsom

30 April 2016 9	BBCU	0–2	Buriram United	Nonthaburi
18:00 (UTC+7)	Moukoko (yellow card) 32'; Piyawit (yellow card) 48'; Julius (yellow card) 53'	Report	Sittichok 36'; Suree (yellow card) 45+1'; Nattapon (yellow card) 77'; Supachok (yellow card) 79'; Moukoko 88' (o.g.)	Stadium: Nonthaburi Youth Centre Stadium; Attendance: 2,895; Referee: Niwat Insa-ad

8 May 2016 10	Buriram United	0–0	Chainat Hornbill	Buriram
19:00 (UTC+7)	Suree (yellow card) 61'; Anan (yellow card) 90+2'	Report	Reis (yellow card) 90+2'; Sho (yellow card) 90+3'	Stadium: New I-Mobile Stadium; Attendance: 13,405; Referee: Taweep Inkaew

11 May 2016 11	Osotspa Samut Prakan	2–2	Buriram United	Samut Prakan
19:00 (UTC+7)	Sarawut (yellow card) 12'; Anthony 31'; Suriya (yellow card) 59'; Sadney 65'	Report	Túñez 13' (pen.); Supachok 26'; Sittichok (yellow card) 68'	Stadium: M Power Stadium; Attendance: 4,983; Referee: Thanet Chuchuen

14 May 2016 12	Buriram United	0–1	Army United	Buriram
18:00 (UTC+7)		Report	Watcharaphol (yellow card) 4'; Sanukran 67'	Stadium: New I-Mobile Stadium; Attendance: 13,934; Referee: Kriangsak Kiatsongkhram

22 May 2016 13	Bangkok Glass	0–2	Buriram United	Pathum Thani
20:00 (UTC+7)	Suban (yellow card) 45'; Jetsadakorn (yellow card) 51'; Pichit (yellow card) 67'	Report	Seul-ki (yellow card) 14', (goal) 37'; Narubadin (yellow card) 56'; Surat (yellow card) 60', (yellow card) 85' (yellow-red card); Kaio (yellow card) 65'; Sathaporn (yellow card) 71'; Anawin 84'; Túñez (yellow card) 90+1'	Stadium: Leo Stadium; Attendance: 10,693; Referee: Wichet Tiantong

28 May 2016 14	Buriram United	1–0	Nakhon Ratchasima	Buriram
18:00 (UTC+7)	Seul-ki 15'	Report	Polawat (yellow card) 21'; Björn (yellow card) 90+3'	Stadium: New I-Mobile Stadium; Attendance: 12,041; Referee: Amnat Pongmanee

12 June 2016 15	Buriram United	0–1	Ratchaburi Mitr Phol	Buriram
19:00 (UTC+7)	Chitipat (yellow card) 57'	Report	Djaló 45+2', (yellow card) 69'; Takuya (yellow card) 51'; Ukrit (yellow card) 66'; Carlos (yellow card) 85'; Chutipol (yellow card) 90+4'	Stadium: New I-Mobile Stadium; Attendance: 8,857; Referee: Anuwat Fheemuechang

18 June 2016 16	Buriram United	3–3	BEC Tero Sasana	Buriram
19:00 (UTC+7)	Sathaporn 11'; Jakkaphan 47'; Seung-yong 60'; Adul (yellow card) 88'	Report	Bosančić 38'; Adison (yellow card) 47', (yellow card) 82' (red card); Chananan 61'; Chenrop 86'; Suriya (yellow card) 90+5'	Stadium: New I-Mobile Stadium; Attendance: 13,181; Referee: Manop Parnsakhon

22 June 2016 17	Sisaket	2–2	Buriram United	Sisaket
19:00 (UTC+7)	Phuwadol 43', 61'; Jakkapong (yellow card) 70'; Yuttana (yellow card) 90+2'	Report	Jakkaphan 11', 45+1', (yellow card) 69'; Anawin (yellow card) 41'; Suree (yellow card) 90+3'	Stadium: Sri Nakhon Lamduan Stadium; Attendance: 8,525; Referee: Thanet Chuchuen

26 June 2016 18	Buriram United	0–0	Bangkok United	Buriram
19:00 (UTC+7)	Túñez (yellow card) 35'	Report	Dragan (yellow card) 69'	Stadium: New I-Mobile Stadium; Attendance: 14,189; Referee: Sivakorn Pu-udom

29 June 2016 19	Navy	0–0	Buriram United	Chonburi
18:00 (UTC+7)	André (yellow card) 30'; Panuwat (yellow card) 53'; Nattaporn (yellow card) 57'; Alef (yellow card) 82'	Report	Sieghart (yellow card) 35'; Adisak (yellow card) 50'; Diogo (yellow card) 83'; Narubadin (yellow card) 90+2'	Stadium: Sattahip Navy Stadium; Attendance: 3,841; Referee: Alongkorn Feemuechang

3 July 2016 20	Buriram United	2–1	Chiangrai United	Buriram
19:00 (UTC+7)	Suree (yellow card) 45+1'; Kaio 45+2'; Túñez 80' (pen.), (yellow card) 78'	Report	Thitipan (yellow card) 9'; Bodin 31', (yellow card) 90+3'; Intharat (yellow card) 72'; Arthit (yellow card) 74'; Piyaphon (yellow card) 84', (yellow card) 85' (yellow-red card)	Stadium: New I-Mobile Stadium; Attendance: 12,833; Referee: Niwat Insa-ad

9 July 2016 21	Suphanburi	1–2	Buriram United	Suphan Buri
19:00 (UTC+7)	Dellatorre 5', (yellow card) 16', (yellow card) 37' (yellow-red card); Thanasit (yellow card) 16'	Report	Surat (yellow card) 15'; Kaio 29', (yellow card) 77', (yellow card) 90+1' (yellow-red card); Sieghart (yellow card) 55'; Chitpanya 65', (yellow card) 66'; Anawin (yellow card) 68'	Stadium: Suphan Buri Provincial Stadium; Attendance: 13,842; Referee: Anuwat Feemuechang

17 July 2016 22	Buriram United	4–2	Pattaya United	Buriram
18:00 (UTC+7)	Suree (yellow card) 11'; Bruno 36'; Anon 51'; Tanasak 53' (o.g.); Anawin 83'	Report	Júnior 3', 54'; Woranat (yellow card) 10'; Suphanan (yellow card) 41', (yellow card) 69' (yellow-red card)	Stadium: New I-Mobile Stadium; Attendance: 16,218; Referee: Chairurk Ngamsom

20 July 2016 23	Buriram United	5–2	Sukhothai	Buriram
18:00 (UTC+7)	Diogo 11', 55'; Chaowat 28'; Túñez 77'; Bruno 80'	Report	Baggio 25'; Piyarat (yellow card) 45'; Renan Marques 56'	Stadium: New I-Mobile Stadium; Attendance: 13,782; Referee: Prakit Sarobon

24 July 2016 24	Muangthong United	3–2	Buriram United	Nonthaburi
19:00 (UTC+7)	Chanathip 45+2'; Sarach 54'; Cleiton 77', (yellow card) 77'; Theerathon (yellow card) 82'	Report	Diogo 17', (yellow card) 82'; Anon 87'	Stadium: SCG Stadium; Attendance: 12,519; Referee: Amnat Pongmanee

30 July 2016 25	Buriram United	4–0	BBCU	Buriram
18:00 (UTC+7)	Narubadin (yellow card) 32'; Bruno 34'; Sieghart (yellow card) 51'; Diogo 64'; Kaio 82'; Koravit (yellow card) 88'; Siwarak (yellow card) 89'; Anon 90+2'	Report	Pavarit (yellow card) 8', (yellow card) 39' (yellow-red card); Julius (yellow card) 85'; Sang-hoon (red card) 85'	Stadium: New I-Mobile Stadium; Attendance: 10,973; Referee: Niwat Insa-ad

7 August 2016 26	Chainat Hornbill	4–4	Buriram United	Chai Nat
19:00 (UTC+7)	Yordrak (yellow card) 1'; Pongolle 32', 47', (yellow card) 53'; Tae-keun (yellow card) 35'; Sompob 66'; Parinya (yellow card) 69'; Anuwat 90+5'	Report	Diogo 2' (pen.), 60', 80', (yellow card) 35'; Baramee (yellow card) 8'; Jakkaphan (yellow card) 17'; Túñez (yellow card) 26'; Anon 64'; Narubadin (yellow card) 90'	Stadium: Khao Plong Stadium; Attendance: 5,350; Referee: Thanet Chuchuen

13 August 2016 27	Buriram United	1–1	Super Power Samut Prakan (Note: In mid-2016, Osotspa Samut Prakan change the name to Super Power Samut Prakan due to their take over.)	Buriram
19:00 (UTC+7)	Diogo 48', (red card) 53'	Report	Jetsada (yellow card) 46'; Sompong 55'; Sadney (yellow card) 70'; Supachai (yellow card) 78'; Panphanpong (yellow card) 83'; Pattara (yellow card) 90+4'	Stadium: New I-Mobile Stadium; Attendance: 14,680; Referee: Wittaya Saraket

20 August 2016 28	Army United	1–2	Buriram United	Din Daeng, Bangkok
20:00 (UTC+7)	Arsan (yellow card) 39'; Josimar 52' (pen.); Dawuth (yellow card) 62'	Report	Bruno 13'; Baramee (yellow card) 47'; Supachok 81'; Chaowat (yellow card) 90+4'	Stadium: Thai Army Sports Stadium; Attendance: 4,441; Referee: Chairurk Ngamsom

10 September 2016 29	Buriram United	2–1	Bangkok Glass	Buriram
19:00 (UTC+7)	Narubadin (yellow card) 34'; Kaio 60' (pen.); Adisak (yellow card) 80'; Chitpanya (yellow card) 90'; Bruno 90+1'	Report	Romain (yellow card) 23'; Piyachanok (yellow card) 33'; Narit (yellow card) 57'; Ariel 74'	Stadium: New I-Mobile Stadium; Attendance: 17,273; Referee: Phumrin Khamruen

17 September 2016 30	Nakhon Ratchasima	2–0	Buriram United	Nakhon Ratchasima
19:00 (UTC+7)	Nattapong (yellow card) 15'; Marco 30'; Chalermpong (yellow card) 45'; Björn 90+3', (yellow card) 90+4'	Report	Ratthanakorn (yellow card) 88'	Stadium: 80th Birthday Stadium; Attendance: 22,029; Referee: Prapoj Dissomsri

19 October 2016 31	BEC Tero Sasana	Cancelled	Buriram United	Min Buri, Bangkok
18:00 (UTC+7)				Stadium: 72nd Anniversary Stadium

23 October 2016 32	Buriram United	Cancelled	Sisaket	Buriram
18:00 (UTC+7)				Stadium: New I-Mobile Stadium

26 October 2016 33	Ratchaburi Mitr Phol	Cancelled	Buriram United	Ratchaburi
18:00 (UTC+7)				Stadium: Mitr Phol Stadium
Note: Match postponed from 24 September due to adverse playing conditions

30 October 2016 34	Chonburi	Cancelled	Buriram United	Chonburi
19:00 (UTC+7)				Stadium: Chon Buri Stadium

=== Chang FA Cup ===
Win Draw Loss

15 June 2016 First round	Buriram United	8–0	Vongchavalitkul University	Buriram
18:00 (UTC+07:00)	Kaio 8', 24'; Túñez 21', 57'; Diogo 30', 50', 64'; Anawin 59'			Stadium: New I-Mobile Stadium

13 July 2016 Second round	Chanthaburi	0–5	Buriram United	Chanthaburi
18:00 (UTC+07:00)			Bruno 26'; Kaio 28' (pen.); Diogo 51'; Anon 89'; Chitipat 90+2'	Stadium: Chanthaburi Provincial Stadium

3 August 2016 Third Round	Muangthong United	3–1	Buriram United	Nonthaburi
19:00 (UTC+07:00)	Adisak 26'; Teerasil 37'; Cleiton 64'		Bruno (red card) 27'; Túñez 75'	Stadium: SCG Stadium; Attendance: 12,487; Referee: Takuto Okabe (Japan)

=== Toyota League Cup ===
Win Draw Loss Cancelled

10 April 2016 First round	Royal Thai Army	1–7	Buriram United	Din Daeng, Bangkok
17:00 (UTC+7)	Pongsuriyan 53'		Weslley 4', 45+4'; Seung-yong 29', 64'; Kaio 39', 80', 83'	Stadium: Thai Army Sports Stadium

8 June 2016 Second round	Nong Khai	0–7	Buriram United	Nong Khai
18:00 (UTC+7)			Túñez 51', 74', 90+2'; Kaio 53', 87'; Seung-yong 57'; Anan 82'	Stadium: Nong Khai Province Stadium

6 July 2016 Third Round	Kasetsart University	0–2	Buriram United	Chatuchak, Bangkok
18:00 (UTC+7)			Diogo 13' (pen.); Túñez 76'	Stadium: Intree Chantarasatit Stadium; Referee: Thanet Chuchuen

10 August 2016 Quarter-finals	Bangkok United	3−3 (a.e.t.) (4−5 p)	Buriram United	Pathum Thani
19:00 (UTC+7)	Macena 36'; Teeratep 69' (pen.); Jojo 110'		Túñez 53'; Diogo 89' (pen.); Supachok 118'	Stadium: Thammasat Stadium; Referee: Sivakorn Pu-udom
	Penalties
	Teeratep (penalty scored); Jojo (penalty scored); Mario (penalty scored); Sumanya (penalty missed); Sanrawat (penalty scored); Tatu (penalty missed)		(penalty scored) Kaio; (penalty missed) Túñez; (penalty scored) Diogo; (penalty scored) Kanu; (penalty scored) Siwarak; (penalty scored) Jakkaphan

17 August 2016 Semi-finals – First leg	Buriram United	3–1	Songkhla United	Buriram
18:00 (UTC+7)	Supachok 17'; Anon 84'; Kaio 90+1' (pen.)		Suárez 45+2'	Stadium: New I-Mobile Stadium; Referee: Alongkorn Fheemuechang

14 September 2016 Semi-finals – Second leg	Songkhla United	0–0 (1–3 agg.)	Buriram United	Songkhla
18:00 (UTC+7)				Stadium: Na Thawi District Stadium; Referee: Thitichai Nualchan

15 October 2016 Final	Buriram United	Cancelled; Shared title	Muangthong United	Pathum Wan, Bangkok
19:00 (UTC+7)				Stadium: Suphachalasai Stadium

=== AFC Champions League ===
Buriram United qualified for the group stage of the 2016 AFC Champions League due to finishing champion in the 2015 Thai Premier League.

==== Group stage ====
Buriram United is staying on group F, with Sanfrecce Hiroshima, FC Seoul and Shandong Luneng Taishan.

Pos	Team	Pld	W	D	L	GF	GA	GD	Pts	Qualification	SEO	SHD	HIR	BUR
1	(South Korea) FC Seoul	6	4	1	1	17	5	+12	13	Advance to knockout stage	—	0–0	4–1	2–1
2	(China) Shandong Luneng	6	3	2	1	7	5	+2	11	Advance to knockout stage	1–4	—	1–0	3–0
3	(Japan) Sanfrecce Hiroshima	6	3	0	3	9	8	+1	9		2–1	1–2	—	3–0
4	(Thailand) Buriram United	6	0	1	5	1	16	−15	1		0–6	0–0	0–2	—

Source: AFC
Rules for classification: Group stage tiebreakers

Win Draw Loss

23 February 2016 1	Buriram United (Thailand)	0–6	(South Korea) FC Seoul	Buriram, Thailand
18:00 UTC+7		Report	Adriano 28', 40', 50', 60'; Damjanović 67'; Lee Seok-hyun 90'	Stadium: New I-Mobile Stadium; Attendance: 11,583; Referee: Mohammed Abdulla Hassan Mohamed (United Arab Emirates)

1 March 2016 2	Shandong Luneng Taishan (China)	3–0	(Thailand) Buriram United	Jinan, China
15:30 UTC+8	Tardelli 65'; Jucilei 81'; Zhao Mingjian 86'	Report		Stadium: Jinan Olympic Sports Center Stadium; Attendance: 23,976; Referee: Fahad Al-Marri (Qatar)

16 March 2016 3	Sanfrecce Hiroshima (Japan)	3–0	(Thailand) Buriram United	Hiroshima, Japan
19:00 UTC+9	Asano 42', 55'; Shimizu 81'	Report		Stadium: Hiroshima Big Arch; Attendance: 6,411; Referee: Nawaf Shukralla (Bahrain)

5 April 2016 4	Buriram United (Thailand)	0–2	(Japan) Sanfrecce Hiroshima	Buriram, Thailand
18:00 UTC+7		Report	Miyayoshi 45'; Shibasaki 88'	Stadium: New I-Mobile Stadium; Attendance: 5,532; Referee: Fahad Al-Mirdasi (Saudi Arabia)

20 April 2016 5	FC Seoul (South Korea)	2–1	(Thailand) Buriram United	Seoul, South Korea
19:30 UTC+9	Damjanović 24'; Park Yong-woo 43'	Report	Túñez 67' (pen.)	Stadium: Seoul World Cup Stadium; Attendance: 5,109; Referee: Abdulrahman Abdou (Qatar)

4 May 2016 6	Buriram United (Thailand)	0–0	(China) Shandong Luneng Taishan	Buriram, Thailand
17:30 UTC+7		Report		Stadium: New I-Mobile Stadium; Attendance: 3,832; Referee: Ali Hasan Ebrahim Abdulnabi (Bahrain)

== Statistics ==
=== Goalscorers ===
As of 17 September 2016

No.	Pos.	Name	Thai League	FA Cup	League Cup	ACL	Other	Total
5	DF	(Venezuela) Andrés Túñez (vc)	9	3	5	1	1	19
7	MF	(South Korea) Go Seul-ki	3	0	0	0	2	5
8	MF	(Thailand) Suchao Nuchnum (c)	1	0	0	0	0	1
9	FW	(Portugal) Bruno Moreira	5	1	0	0	0	6
10	MF	(Thailand) Jakkaphan Kaewprom	3	0	0	0	1	4
14	DF	(Thailand) Chitipat Tanklang	0	1	0	0	0	1
17	MF	(Thailand) Anawin Jujeen	3	1	0	0	0	4
18	FW	(Thailand) Sittichok Kannoo	1	0	0	0	0	1
19	MF	(Thailand) Supachok Sarachat	2	0	2	0	0	4
20	FW	(Brazil) Kaio Felipe Gonçalves	5	3	6	0	0	14
21	MF	(Thailand) Chitpanya Tisud	1	0	0	0	0	1
28	MF	(Thailand) Chaowat Veerachat	1	0	0	0	0	1
34	MF	(Thailand) Anon Amornlerdsak	7	1	1	0	0	9
39	FW	(Thailand) Anan Buasang	0	0	1	0	0	1
40	FW	(Brazil) Diogo Luís Santo	11	4	2	0	1	18
Left club during the season
2	DF	(Thailand) Theerathon Bunmathan	1	0	0	0	0	1
3	DF	(Thailand) Sathaporn Daengsee	1	0	0	0	0	1
9	FW	(Brazil) Weslley Smith Alves Feitosa	0	0	2	0	0	2
22	MF	(South Korea) Kim Seung-yong	3	0	3	0	0	6
