= 2016 Army United F.C. season =

Army United
2016 season
- Chairman: Gen. Teerachai Narkvanich
- Manager: Watcharakorn Antakhamphu
- Stadium: Royal Thai Army Stadium, Phaya Thai, Bangkok, Thailand
- Thai League: 16th
- Thai FA Cup: Round of 16
- Thai League Cup: Round of 64
- Top goalscorer: League: Josimar Souza (16); All: Josimar Souza (18)

The 2016 season is Army United's 14th season in the Thai Premier League on 1996–1999, 2006–2008 and since 2010.

== Squad ==
Note: Flags indicate national team as defined under FIFA eligibility rules; some limited exceptions apply. Players may hold more than one non-FIFA nationality.

No.	Pos.	Nation	Player
1	GK	THA	Tamphan Pojchamarnsirikul
2	DF	THA	Chatchai Mokkasem
3	DF	THA	Dawuth Dinkhet (Vice-captain)
4	DF	THA	Kriangkrai Chasang
5	MF	THA	Trakoolchat Thongbai
6	DF	SVK	Zdenko Kaprálik
7	FW	BRA	Josimar
8	MF	THA	Nipol Kamthong
9	FW	THA	Tanakorn Dangthong
10	MF	BRA	Raphael Botti
11	FW	THA	Thammarat Wanmanee
13	FW	JPN	Kai Hirano
15	MF	THA	Noppadol Juijaiherm
16	MF	THA	Sanukran Thinjom (on loan from Muangthong United)
17	MF	THA	Eaksatha Thanyakam
18	GK	SGP	Hassan Sunny

No.	Pos.	Nation	Player
19	FW	THA	Arsan Pengbanrai
21	MF	THA	Kanok Kohyangpueak
22	DF	THA	Siwamet Thanusorn
23	MF	THA	Mongkol Tossakrai (captain)
25	DF	THA	Rungsak Kothcharak
27	FW	THA	Kunchit Senyasaen
28	MF	THA	Thossawat Limwannasathian
29	DF	BRA	Rodrigo Frauches
30	MF	THA	Thannarong Thurian
31	MF	THA	Anuwat Noicheunphan
32	DF	THA	Rattakit Chanana
33	GK	THA	Suphachat Apichatyanan
35	FW	THA	Watcharaphol Photanorm
38	DF	THA	Chaiwat Nak-iem
39	MF	THA	Tatchanon Nakarawong

== Foreign Players ==
Note: Flags indicate national team as defined under FIFA eligibility rules; some limited exceptions apply. Players may hold more than one non-FIFA nationality.

No.	Pos.	Nation	Player
6	DF	SVK	Zdenko Kaprálik
7	FW	BRA	Josimar Souza
10	MF	BRA	Raphael Botti
18	GK	SGP	Hassan Sunny
19	FW	JPN	Kai Hirano

== Thai League ==
Pos	Team	Pld	W	D	L	GF	GA	GD	Pts	Qualification or relegation
14	Navy	31	7	10	14	25	40	−15	31	
15	Super Power Samut Prakan	31	8	7	16	45	71	−26	31	
16	Army United (R)	31	8	6	17	34	46	−12	30	Relegation to the 2017 League Division 1
17	Chainat Hornbill (R)	31	8	6	17	46	61	−15	30	Relegation to the 2017 League Division 1
18	BBCU (R)	30	3	4	23	32	69	−37	13	Relegation to the 2017 League Division 1

Updated to match(es) played on 25 September 2016. Source: Thai League
Rules for classification: 1) points; 2) goal difference; 3) number of goals scored.
(R) Relegated

Date	Opponents	H / A	Result F–A	Scorers	League position
5 March 2016	BEC Tero Sasana	A	2–1	Anuwat 47', Josimar 60'	6th
9 March 2016	Ratchaburi Mitr Phol	H	1–3	Josimar 37'	13th
13 March 2016	Bangkok Glass	A	0–2		15th
16 March 2016	Bangkok United	H	3–4	Hirano 48', Mongkol 60', Tanakorn 66'	17th
30 March 2016	Navy	H	2–0	Tanakorn 14', Josimar 37'	12th
3 April 2016	Sisaket	A	0–2		12th
24 April 2016	Pattaya United	H	1–2	Hirano 42' (pen.)	13th
27 April 2016	Chonburi	A	1–1	Josimar 39'	14th
1 May 2016	Chiangrai United	H	1–0	Josimar 32'	13th
8 May 2016	Suphanburi	A	0–1		13th
11 May 2016	Sukhothai	H	1–1	Josimar 17'	13th
14 May 2016	Buriram United	A	1–0	Sanukran 66'	12th
21 May 2016	BBCU	H	2–0	Hirano 6', Thossawat 47'	10th
28 May 2016	Chainat Hornbill	A	1–1	Josimar 39'	10th
11 June 2016	Osotspa M-150 Samut Prakan	H	2–0	Nipol 54', Josimar 85' (pen.)	9th
19 June 2016	SCG Muangthong United	H	0–1		9th
22 June 2016	Nakhon Ratchasima Mazda	A	0–1		11th
26 June 2016	BEC Tero Sasana	H	2–3	Josimar 20' (pen.), Sanukran 84'	12th
29 June 2016	Ratchaburi Mitr Phol	A	1–3	Sanukran 86'	13th
2 July 2016	Bangkok Glass	H	0–0		13th
9 July 2016	Navy	A	2–1	Hirano (2) 31', 51'	12th
16 July 2016	Sisaket	H	1–1	Josimar 90+2'	11th
20 July 2016	Pattaya NNK United (Note: In mid-2016, Pattaya United change the name to Pattaya NNK United due to their take sponsor.)	A	2–2	Chaiwat 8', Sanukran 34'	12th
24 July 2016	Chonburi	H	0–2		13th
30 July 2016	Chiangrai United	A	1–2	Josimar 35'	13th
6 August 2016	Suphanburi	H	0–1		14th
14 August 2016	Sukhothai	A	0–1		14th
20 August 2016	Buriram United	H	1–2	Josimar 52' (pen.)	15th
11 September 2016	BBCU	A	2–1	Josimar (2) 85' (pen.), 90+2' (pen.)	13th
17 September 2016	Chainat Hornbill	H	2–4	Josimar 8', Thammarat 21'	15th
25 September 2016	Super Power Samut Prakan (Note: In mid-2016, Osotspa M-150 Samut Prakan change the name to Super Power Samut Prakan due to their take over.)	A	2–3	Josimar 54' (pen.), Thammarat 90+2'	16th

== Thai FA Cup ==
Chang FA Cup

Date	Opponents	H / A	Result F–A	Scorers	Round
15 June 2016	Loei City	A	3–1	Thossawat 43', Thammarat 71', Sanukran 77'	Round of 64
13 July 2016	Krabi	H	3–2	Josimar 3', Tanakorn 80', Kanok 81'	Round of 32
3 August 2016	Sukhothai	H	3–4 (a.e.t.)	Tanakorn 52', Josimar 69', Frauches 90+3'	Round of 16

== Thai League Cup ==
Toyota League Cup

Date	Opponents	H / A	Result F–A	Scorers	Round
9 April 2016	Ubon UMT United	A	0–4		Round of 64

== Squad goals statistics ==
No.	Pos.	Name	League	FA Cup	League Cup	Total
1	GK	(Thailand) Tamphan Pojchamarnsirikul	0	0	0	0
3	DF	(Thailand) Dawuth Dinkhet	0	0	0	0
4	DF	(Thailand) Kriangkrai Chasang	0	0	0	0
5	MF	(Thailand) Trakoolchat Thongbai	0	0	0	0
6	DF	(Slovakia) Zdenko Kaprálik	0	0	0	0
7	FW	(Brazil) Josimar Souza	16	2	0	18
8	MF	(Thailand) Nipol Kamthong	1	0	0	1
9	FW	(Thailand) Tanakorn Dangthong	2	2	0	4
10	MF	(Brazil) Raphael Botti	0	0	0	0
11	FW	(Thailand) Thammarat Wanmanee	2	1	0	3
13	FW	(Japan) Kai Hirano	5	0	0	5
15	MF	(Thailand) Noppadol Juijaiherm	0	0	0	0
16	MF	(Thailand) Sanukran Thinjom	4	1	0	5
17	MF	(Thailand) Eaksatha Thanyakam	0	0	0	0
18	GK	(Singapore) Hassan Sunny	0	0	0	0
19	FW	(Thailand) Arsan Pengbanrai	0	0	0	0
21	MF	(Thailand) Kanok Kohyangpueak	0	1	0	1
22	DF	(Thailand) Siwamet Thanusorn	0	0	0	0
25	DF	(Thailand) Rungsak Kothcharak	0	0	0	0
27	MF	(Thailand) Teeraphol Yoryoei	0	0	0	0
28	MF	(Thailand) Thossawat Limwannasathian	1	1	0	2
29	DF	(Brazil) Rodrigo Frauches	0	1	0	1
30	MF	(Thailand) Thannarong Thurian	0	0	0	0
32	DF	(Thailand) Rattakit Chanana	0	0	0	0
33	GK	(Thailand) Suphachat Apichatyanan	0	0	0	0
34	FW	(Thailand) Attapon Kannoo	0	0	0	0
35	FW	(Thailand) Watcharaphol Photanorm	0	0	0	0
38	DF	(Thailand) Chaiwat Nak-iem	1	0	0	1
39	MF	(Thailand) Tatchanon Nakarawong	0	0	0	0
Out on loan
–	MF	(Thailand) Mongkol Tossakrai	1	0	0	1
–	MF	(Thailand) Anuwat Noicheunphan	1	0	0	1
–	DF	(Thailand) Chatchai Mokkasem	0	0	0	0

== Transfers ==
First Thai footballer's market is opening on 27 December 2015, to 28 January 2016
Second Thai footballer's market is opening on 3 June 2016, to 30 June 2016

=== In ===
Date	Pos.	Name	From
29 December 2015	DF	(Thailand) Arsan Pengbanrai	(Thailand) Lampang
15 January 2016	DF	(Thailand) Rattakit Chanana	(Thailand) Krabi
5 January 2016	MF	(Thailand) Kunchit Senyasaen	(Thailand) Ubon UMT United
16 January 2016	MF	(Thailand) Thammarat Wanmanee	(Thailand) Chamchuri United
16 January 2016	MF	(Thailand) Thannarong Thurian	(Thailand) Chamchuri United
17 January 2016	MF	(Thailand) Watcharapon Phothanom	(Thailand) Thonburi City
24 February 2016	DF	(Brazil) Rodrigo Frauches	(Brazil) Flamengo
25 February 2016	FW	(Brazil) Josimar Souza	(Saudi Arabia) Al-Fateh
29 June 2016	FW	(Thailand) Attaphon Kannoo	(Thailand) Suphanburi
15 July 2016	MF	(Thailand) Thammachart Nakaphan	(Thailand) Nakhon Ratchasima Mazda

=== Out ===
Date	Pos.	Name	To
22 December 2015	FW	(Brazil) Alexssander Medeiros	(Sweden) Hammarby IF
27 December 2015	DF	(Thailand) Ernesto Amantegui	(Thailand) Bangkok United
31 December 2015	FW	(Netherlands) Melvin de Leeuw	(Thailand) Khon Kaen United
4 January 2016	DF	(Thailand) Pichit Ketsro	(Thailand) Bangkok Glass

=== Loan in ===
Date from	Date to	Pos.	Name	From
23 December 2015	31 December 2016	MF	(Thailand) Sanukran Thinjom	(Thailand) SCG Muangthong United
28 June 2016	31 December 2016	MF	(Thailand) Teeraphol Yoryoei	(Thailand) BEC Tero Sasana

=== Loan Out ===
Date from	Date to	Pos.	Name	To
31 December 2015	31 December 2016	FW	(Thailand) Kritnaphop Mekpatcharakul	(Thailand) Ratchaburi Mitr Phol
15 June 2016	31 December 2016	MF	(Thailand) Mongkol Tossakrai	(Thailand) Chiangrai United
25 June 2016	31 December 2016	MF	(Thailand) Anuwat Noicheunphan	(Thailand) Chainat Hornbill
28 June 2016	31 December 2016	DF	(Thailand) Chatchai Mokkasem	(Thailand) Sisaket
