= 2016 Kor Royal Cup =

Buriram United	Muangthong United
3	1
- Date: 20 February 2016
- Venue: Supachalasai Stadium, Bangkok
- Referee: Teetichai Nualjan

The 2016 Kor Royal Cup was the 81st Kor Royal Cup, an annual football match contested by the winners of the previous season's Thai Premier League and Thai FA Cup competitions. The match was played at Supachalasai Stadium, Bangkok and contested by 2015 Thai Premier League champions Buriram United, and 2015 Thai Premier League runners-up Muangthong United, as Buriram also won the 2015 Thai FA Cup. This match was the last edition of Kor Royal Cup, continued by Thailand Champions Cup in 2017.

== Details ==
20 February 2016
18.30 UTC+7

Buriram United	3 - 1	Muangthong United
Diogo 14'; Túñez 68' (pen.); Jakkaphan 83'	Report	Adisak 78'

Supachalasai Stadium, Bangkok
Referee: Teetichai Nualjan

Buriram United	Muangthong United

GK	1	(Thailand) Siwarak Tedsungnoen
LWB	2	(Thailand) Theerathon Bunmathan
DF	5	(Venezuela) Andrés Túñez
MF	7	(South Korea) Go Seul-ki		(yellow card) 45+2'
MF	8	(Thailand) Suchao Nutnum (c)	(yellow card) 41'	(substituted off) 46'
MF	10	(Thailand) Jakkaphan Kaewprom		(yellow card) 88'
DF	14	(Thailand) Chitipat Tanklang
DF	16	(Thailand) Koravit Namwiset
RWB	17	(Thailand) Anawin Jujeen		(substituted off) 81'
FW	20	(Brazil) Kaio Felipe Gonçalves		(substituted off) 75'
FW	40	(Brazil) Diogo Luís Santo		(yellow card) 82'
Substitutes:
GK	29	(Thailand) Yotsapon Teangdar
DF	3	(Thailand) Sathaporn Dangsri
MF	4	(Thailand) Adul Lahsoh		(substituted on) 46'
MF	11	(Brazil) André Moritz		(substituted on) 75'
DF	24	(Thailand) Nukoolkit Krutyai
DF	25	(Thailand) Suree Sukha		(substituted on) 81'
DF	27	(Thailand) Nattaphon Malaphan
MF	28	(Thailand) Chaowat Veerachat
MF	39	(Thailand) Anan Buasang
Head Coach:
(Brazil) Alexandre Gama

GK	1	(Thailand) Kawin Thamsatchanan (c)
DF	2	(Thailand) Peerapat Notchaiya	(yellow card) 65'
DF	3	(Brazil) Fabrício Silva Dornellas
DF	5	(Japan) Naoaki Aoyama	(substituted off) 47'
MF	6	(Thailand) Sarach Yooyen	(yellow card) 45+1'
DF	8	(Thailand) Atit Daosawang	(yellow card) 37'
FW	9	(Brazil) Júnior	(substituted off) 55'
MF	17	(Thailand) Tanaboon Kesarat	(yellow card) 76'
MF	18	(Thailand) Chanathip Songkrasin
FW	23	(Brazil) Cleiton Silva
MF	25	(Thailand) Thitipan Puangchan	(substituted off) 79'
Substitutes:
GK	38	(Thailand) Ittikorn Karnsang
GK	39	(Thailand) Witsanusak Kaewruang
DF	4	(Thailand) Piyaphon Phanichakul
MF	7	(Thailand) Datsakorn Thonglao
FW	10	(Thailand) Teerasil Dangda
FW	11	(Thailand) Adisak Kraisorn	(substituted on) 55'
MF	15	(Thailand) Seksit Srisai
MF	21	(Thailand) Wasan Samarnsin
FW	22	(Thailand) Chananan Pombuppha
MF	24	(Thailand) Kasidech Wettayawong	(substituted on) 79'
DF	26	(Thailand) Suphan Thongsong	(substituted on) 47'
MF	32	(Thailand) Peeradon Chamratsamee
MF	33	(Thailand) Chaiyawat Buran
MF	34	(Thailand) Wattana Playnum
Head Coach:
(Thailand) Totchtawan Sripan

Assistant referees:
Nathakorn Chimpalee
Binla Preeda
Fourth official:
Alongkron Feemuechang
Match Commissioner:
(Singapore) Mr. Benjamin Tan
Referee Assessor:
Ekachai Thanaduengkao

MATCH RULES

- 90 minutes.
- Penalty shoot-out if necessary.
- Maximum of three substitutions.

== See also ==
- 2016 Thai League
- 2016 Thai Division 1 League
- 2016 Regional League Division 2
- 2016 Football Division 3
- 2016 Thai FA Cup
- 2016 Thai League Cup
