= Baramee Limwattana =

Thai footballer (born 1996)

Personal information
- Full name: Baramee Limwattana
- Date of birth: 4 January 1996 (age 30)
- Place of birth: Samut Prakarn, Thailand
- Height: 1.75 m (5 ft 9 in)
- Position: Midfielder

Team information
- Current team: Burapha United
- Number: 16

Youth career
- 2011–2013: Onehunga Sports

Senior career*
Years	Team	Apps	(Gls)
2013–2014	Waitakere United	0	(0)
2014	Sriracha	21	(1)
2016–2018	Buriram United	5	(0)
2017	→ Thai Honda Ladkrabang (loan	9	(0)
2017–2018	→ Chainat Hornbill (loan)	10	(1)
2021–2022	MH Khon Surat City	15	(0)
2023–2024	MH Nakhon Si City	5	(0)
2024–2025	Navy	21	(1)
2025–	Burapha United	17	(2)

International career
2013–2014	Thailand U19	7	(0)
2016–2017	Thailand U21	1	(0)
- * Club domestic league appearances and goals as of 27 January 2024 (UTC)

Baramee Limwattana (Thai: บารมี ลิ้มวัฒนะ; born January 4, 1996) is a Thai former professional footballer.

== Personal life ==
Baramee has a brother Sansern Limwattana is also a footballer and plays for Bangkok United as a midfielder.

== Honours ==
=== Club ===
Chainat Hornbill

- Thai League 2 (1); 2017
