= Tanakorn Dangthong =

Thai footballer

Personal information
- Full name: Tanakorn Dangthong
- Date of birth: 30 September 1990 (age 36)
- Place of birth: Lopburi, Thailand
- Height: 1.78 m (5 ft 10 in)
- Position: Striker

Youth career
- 2006–2009: Army United

Senior career*
Years	Team	Apps	(Gls)
2010–2019	Army United	142	(29)
2013	→ TOT (loan)	10	(1)
2020	Port	0	(0)
2020	MOF Customs United	5	(0)
2021	Sisaket	12	(2)
2021–	Royal Thai Army	0	(0)
- * Club domestic league appearances and goals as of 28 March 2014

Tanakorn Dangthong (Thai: ธนากร แดงทอง, born September 30, 1990) is a Thai professional footballer who plays as a striker for Thai League 3 club Sisaket.
