= Eaksatha Thanyakam =

Thai footballer (born 1979)

Personal information
- Full name: Eaksatha Thanyakam
- Date of birth: 1 July 1979 (age 47)
- Place of birth: Thailand
- Height: 1.79 m (5 ft 10 1/2 in)
- Position: Midfielder

Senior career*
Years	Team	Apps	(Gls)
2001–2007	Army United		
2009–2010	Phichit		
2011	PTT Rayong		
2012	Udon Thani	23	(2)
2013	Paknampho NSRU		
2014	Phitsanulok		
2014	Air Force Central		
2015–2017	Army United	11	(1)
- * Club domestic league appearances and goals

Eaksatha Thanyakam (Thai: เอกสถา ธัญญกรรม, born July 1, 1979) is a Thai former professional footballer who played as a midfielder.

== Honours ==
=== Club ===
Army United

- Thai Division 1 League (1): 2004-05

Paknampho NSRU

- Regional League Division 2 (1): 2013
