= Ajoku Obinna =

Nigerian footballer

Personal information
- Full name: Ajoku Obinna Darlington
- Date of birth: 4 November 1984 (age 42)
- Place of birth: Nigeria

Senior career*
Years	Team	Apps	(Gls)
- Gabros
- Kano Pillars F.C.
2007–2008	Nam Định F.C.		
2010–2011	Bình Định F.C.		
2012	Fico Tây Ninh F.C.		
2013	Pattaya United F.C.	13	(8)
2013–2014	Air Force United F.C.	3	(1)
2014	Kelantan FA (trial)		
2015	Tarxien Rainbows F.C.	12	(5)
2015–20xx	Phrae United F.C.		

International career
- Nigeria U23
- * Club domestic league appearances and goals

Ajoku Obinna Darlington (born 4 November 1984 in Nigeria) is a Nigerian former footballer who played with Pattaya United F.C. in the Thai Professional League in 2013. He is last known to have been tied to Phrae United. He holds Ghanaian Asamoah Gyan as his main inspiration.

== Career ==
=== Vietnam ===
Inspiring Bình Định to overpower TDC Bình Dương 2-1 with a double late February 2011, Obinna was injured and required a month of treatment before being able to compete that summer, added to Tây Ninh mid-2012.

Recalling his years in Vietnam, he claimed that a lot of his teammates were virulent racists and refused to train with their African counterparts.

=== Malaysia ===
About to compromise on a deal with Kelantan FA early November 2014, the transfer was cancelled by Air Force United at the last minute.

=== Malta ===
Inspected by the Maltese Premier League's Tarxien Rainbows at the close of January 2015, he settled on a six-month contract with them afterwards, opening his goal account as they held Floriana 1-1, hitting in a double to sink Żebbuġ Rangers. However, the former U23 member did not renew his commitment to Tarxien that summer, receiving offers from different countries.

=== Thailand ===
Waiting for six months to clear a visa problem with Pattaya United near the end of July 2013 and missing the first half of the season, the wideman hoped to escape relegation with the Dolphins but they were still demoted. Committing to two years with Air Force United in 2014, he parted with the Eagles that summer, continuing to recover from an injury in Nigeria.
