= Kunchit Senyasaen =

Thai footballer

Personal information
- Full name: Kunchit Senyasaen
- Date of birth: July 12, 1993 (age 33)
- Place of birth: Nong Khai, Thailand
- Height: 1.70 m (5 ft 7 in)
- Position: Forward

Youth career
- 2010–2011: Nong Khai

Senior career*
Years	Team	Apps	(Gls)
2012–2014	Nong Khai	19	(7)
2015	Ubon UMT United	21	(6)
2016	Army United	1	(0)
2016–2017	Ubon UMT United	0	(0)
2017	→ Yasothon (loan)		
- * Club domestic league appearances and goals

Kunchit Senyasaen (Thai: ครรชิต เสนยะแสน, born July 12, 1993) is a Thai professional footballer who plays as a forward.

== Honours ==
=== Club ===
Ubon UMT United

- Regional League Division 2: 2015
