= Narong Wongthongkam =

Thai footballer

Personal information
- Full name: Narong Wongthongkam
- Date of birth: 2 October 1982 (age 44)
- Place of birth: Suphan Buri, Thailand
- Height: 1.84 m (6 ft 1/2 in)
- Position: Goalkeeper

Youth career
- 2005: Osotspa

Senior career*
| Years | Team | Apps | (Gls) |
| 2006–2014 | Osotspa | 18 | (0) |
| 2015 | Sisaket | 34 | (0) |
| 2016–2017 | Navy | 47 | (0) |
| Total | | 99 | (0) |
- * Club domestic league appearances and goals as of 11:05, 21 November 2017 (UTC)

Narong Wongthongkam (Thai: ณรงค์ วงษ์ทองคำ; born October 2, 1982) is a Thai former professional footballer.

== Match fixing scandal and ban ==
On February 21, 2017 Narong was accused of match-fixing on several league games. He was arrested by Royal Thai Police and banned from football for life.
