= Kriangkrai Chasang =

Thai footballer (born 1988)

Personal information
- Full name: Kriangkrai Chasang
- Date of birth: 25 January 1988 (age 38)
- Place of birth: Sakon Nakhon, Thailand
- Height: 1.82 m (5 ft 11 1/2 in)
- Position: Defender

Youth career
- 2004–2006: Assumption College Sriracha

Senior career*
Years	Team	Apps	(Gls)
2006–2012	Bangkok United	29	(2)
2012–2013	Songkhla United	0	(0)
2013	Phuket	16	(3)
2014	Bangkok	24	(0)
2015–2016	Army United	15	(1)
2017–2019	Thai Honda Ladkrabang		
- * Club domestic league appearances and goals as of 14 November 2008

Kriangkrai Chasang (Thai: เกรียงไกร ชาสังข์, born January 25, 1988) is a Thai professional footballer who plays as a defender.

== Honours ==
=== Club ===
Bangkok United

- Thai League 1: 2006
