= Isaac Honny =

Ghanaian footballer

Personal information
- Full name: Isaac Nana Honny
- Date of birth: 6 June 1993 (age 33)
- Place of birth: Kumasi, Ghana
- Height: 1.85 m (6 ft 1 in)
- Position: Centre-back

Team information
- Current team: Sisaket United
- Number: 35

Youth career
- 2011–2012: BEC Tero Sasana

Senior career*
Years	Team	Apps	(Gls)
2013–2016	BEC Tero Sasana	23	(1)
2014–2016	→ Air Force United (loan)	31	(4)
2017–2018	Angthong	0	(0)
2019–2024	Police Tero	114	(12)
2024–2025	Port	21	(2)
2025–2026	Police Tero	33	(5)
2026–	Sisaket United	0	(0)

International career
2015	Ghana U23	3	(0)
- * Club domestic league appearances and goals as of 18 May 2026

Isaac Nana Honny (born 6 June 1993) is a Ghanaian professional footballer who plays as a centre-back for Thai League 1 club Sisaket United.
