= Zdenko Kaprálik =

Slovak footballer

Personal information
- Full name: Zdenko Kaprálik
- Date of birth: 28 August 1985 (age 41)
- Place of birth: Dolný Kubín, Czechoslovakia
- Height: 1.93 m (6 ft 4 in)
- Positions: Right back; centre back

Senior career*
Years	Team	Apps	(Gls)
2004–2007	Inter Bratislava	47	(1)
2007–2008	Fotbal Fulnek	20	(1)
2008–2010	Zwolle	44	(0)
2010	Cambuur	10	(1)
2011	Spartak Trnava	10	(1)
2011–2012	FC Oss	29	(1)
2012–2013	Baník Ostrava	25	(1)
2013	FC Oss	17	(0)
2014–2017	Army United	98	(0)
- * Club domestic league appearances and goals

Zdenko Kaprálik (born 28 August 1985) is a Slovak former professional footballer.

== Career ==
Born in Dolný Kubín, Žilina Region, Kaprálik played for Inter Bratislava, FC Zwolle, SC Cambuur and FC Spartak Trnava. In 2014 he joined Thai side Army United.
