= Anuwat Inyin =

Thai footballer (born 1985)

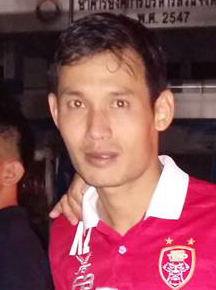

Personal information
- Full name: Anuwat Inyin
- Date of birth: 17 February 1985 (age 41)
- Place of birth: Suphan Buri, Thailand
- Height: 1.75 m (5 ft 9 in)
- Position: Central midfielder

Youth career
- 2000–2003: Air Technical Training School

Senior career*
Years	Team	Apps	(Gls)
2004–2011	Air Force United	68	(9)
2011–2013	Pattaya United	42	(3)
2014	Muangthong United	9	(0)
2015–2018	Pattaya United	53	(4)
2016	→ BEC Tero Sasana (loan)	5	(0)
2019	Nongbua Pitchaya	12	(0)
Total		186	(16)
- * Club domestic league appearances and goals as of 28 June 2008

Anuwat Inyin (Thai: อนุวัฒน์ อินยิน; born 17 February 1985), simply known as Nu (Thai: นุ), is a Thai retired professional footballer who played as a central midfielder.

== Club career ==
He was voted the best midfielder in the 2010 Thai Division 1 League whilst playing for Air Force United.
