= Pongtep Mulalee =

Thai footballer (born 1988)

Personal information
- Full name: Pongtep Mulalee
- Date of birth: 4 November 1988 (age 37)
- Place of birth: Udon Thani, Thailand
- Height: 1.64 m (5 ft 4 1/2 in)
- Position: Midfielder

Team information
- Current team: Udon Thani

Senior career*
Years	Team	Apps	(Gls)
2008–2010	Prachinburi	47	(15)
2011	Rayong	28	(5)
2012	Rayong United	25	(5)
2013–2015	Ayutthaya	63	(10)
2015–2016	BEC Tero Sasana	1	(0)
2017	Udon Thani	21	(0)
2018	Ayutthaya	11	(0)
2018	Kabin United	10	(0)
2019–	Udon Thani	12	(0)
- * Club domestic league appearances and goals

Pongtep Mulalee (Thai: ปองเทพ มุลาลี, born November 4, 1988) is a Thai professional footballer who currently plays for Udon Thani in the Thai League 3.

== Honours ==
=== Club ===
Prachinburi

- Thai Division 2 League Champions (1) : 2008
