= Chalermsuk Kaewsuktae =

Thai footballer (born 1989)

Personal information
- Full name: Chalermsuk Kaewsuktae
- Date of birth: 9 May 1989 (age 37)
- Place of birth: Ratchaburi, Thailand
- Height: 1.79 m (5 ft 10 1/2 in)
- Position: Defender

Team information
- Current team: Customs United
- Number: 4

Senior career*
Years	Team	Apps	(Gls)
2006–2009	Nakhon Pathom United	45	(16)
2009–2012	BEC Tero Sasana	26	(5)
2011–2012	→ Chula United (loan)	19	(4)
2011–2012	Chainat	56	(5)
2012	Buriram United	11	(1)
2013–2014	PTT Rayong	22	(1)
2014	→ Nakhon Pathom United (loan)	14	(0)
2015	Ubon UMT United	19	(3)
2016	Samut Songkhram	20	(0)
2017	Trat	19	(1)
2018	Samut Sakhon		
2019–2020	Trat	11	(1)
2020–2022	Uthai Thani	4	(0)
2022–2023	Pluakdaeng United	6	(0)
2023–	Customs United	3	(0)

International career
2009–2010	Thailand U23	4	(0)
- * Club domestic league appearances and goals as of 18 March 2023

Chalermsuk Kaewsuktae (Thai: เฉลิมศักดิ์ แก้วสุขแท้; born May 9, 1989) is a Thai professional footballer.

== Honours ==
=== Club ===
Ubon UMT United

- Regional League North-East Division
  - Runner-up : 2015

Buriram United F.C.

- Thai FA Cup
  - Winners : 2012
- Thai League Cup
  - Winners : 2012
