= Fodé Bangaly Diakité =

Ivorian footballer

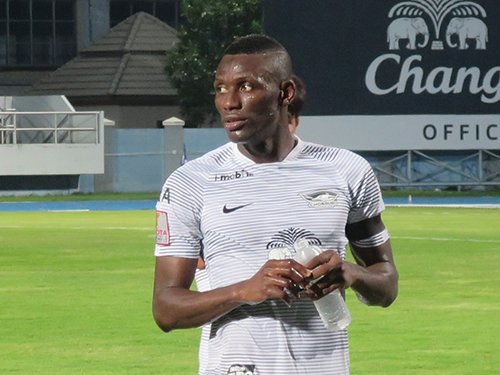

Personal information
- Full name: Fodé Bangaly Diakité
- Date of birth: January 26, 1985 (age 41)
- Place of birth: Dabakala, Ivory Coast
- Height: 1.84 m (6 ft 0 in)
- Positions: Center back; defensive midfielder

Senior career*
Years	Team	Apps	(Gls)
2001	Selafe	22	(5)
2002	Toumodi	25	(4)
2003	Issia Wazi	34	(6)
2004	Anderlecht B	30	(2)
2005	Union Saint-Gilloise (loan)	20	(0)
2006	Chonburi	28	(1)
2006–2007	Home United	30	(8)
2008	Pattaya United	12	(4)
2009–2012	Paris FC	16	(6)
2012–2014	Chonburi	76	(3)
2015	BEC Tero Sasana	31	(4)
2016	Phan Thong	8	(3)
2017	Chonburi	34	(3)
2018	Rayong		
- * Club domestic league appearances and goals as of 16:06, 19 May 2016 (UTC)

Fodé Bangaly Diakité (born January 26, 1985, in Dabakala) is an Ivorian footballer.

== Career ==
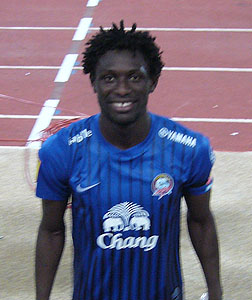
Diakité in 2012.

He formerly played for Selafe FC, Toumodi FC, Issia Wazi, Anderlecht's B team, R. Union Saint-Gilloise, Chonburi, Home United, and Pattaya United. He signed with Paris FC in January 2009, and returned to Chonburi in 2012.
