= Jhon Obregón =

Colombian footballer (born 1990)

Personal information
- Full name: Jhon Adolfo Obregón Quiñones
- Date of birth: February 8, 1990 (age 36)
- Place of birth: Cali, Colombia
- Height: 1.80 m (5 ft 11 in)
- Position: Striker

Team information
- Current team: Ayacucho FC

Youth career
- 2011: Boca Juniors de Cali

Senior career*
Years	Team	Apps	(Gls)
2011–2012	La Paz FC	24	(8)
2012	Nacional Potosí	21	(7)
2013	Veracruz	4	(0)
2013	Ratchaburi	12	(4)
2014	Nacional Potosí	4	(0)
2014	Guarani	6	(1)
2015	Riffa	0	(0)
2015	Ethnikos Achna	11	(3)
2016	FK Vardar	2	(0)
2017	Birkirkara	2	(0)
2018–	Ayacucho FC	6	(0)
- * Club domestic league appearances and goals as of 22 March 2018

Jhon Adolfo Obregón Quiñones (born 8 February 1990) is a Colombian footballer who plays as a striker for Ayacucho FC.
