= Dmitry Gorbushin =

Ukrainian-Russian footballer

Dmitriy Gorbushin
Personal information
- Full name: Dmitriy Andreyevich Gorbushin
- Date of birth: 31 May 1986 (age 40)
- Place of birth: Rubizhne, Ukrainian SSR, Soviet Union
- Height: 1.76 m (5 ft 9 in)
- Position: Midfielder

Senior career*
Years	Team	Apps	(Gls)
2004–2006	Stal Alchevsk	59	(2)
2006–2007	Dynamo Kyiv	0	(0)
2006–2007	→ Dynamo-2 Kyiv	4	(0)
2007	→ Zorya Luhansk (loan)	8	(0)
2008–2010	Kuban Krasnodar	45	(5)
2009	→ Chernomorets Novorossiysk (loan)	14	(4)
2011	Chernomorets Novorossiysk	20	(3)
2013	Minsk	7	(0)
2015	BEC Tero Sasana	5	(1)
2017	Lampang		
2018–2019	Khujand	9	(2)
- * Club domestic league appearances and goals

Dmitriy Andreyevich Gorbushin (Russian: Дмитрий Андреевич Горбушин; Ukrainian: Дмитро Андрійович Горбушин; born 31 May 1986) is a Ukrainian-Russian former professional footballer. He also holds Russian citizenship.

== Career ==
He made his debut in the Russian Premier League for FC Kuban Krasnodar in a game against FC Tom Tomsk on 11 April 2009. On 5 August 2009 FC Chernomorets Novorossiysk have signed the midfielder Dmitry Gorbushin on loan from Kuban Krasnodar until December 2009.

On 9 July 2018, Gorbushin signed for FK Khujand, leaving Khujand at the end of his contract in January 2019.
