= Maximiliano Laso =

Argentine footballer

Maxi Laso
Personal information
- Full name: Maximiliano Andres Laso
- Date of birth: February 17, 1988 (age 38)
- Place of birth: Buenos Aires, Argentina
- Height: 1.69 m (5 ft 6 1/2 in)
- Position: Attacking midfielder

Team information
- Current team: San Telmo

Youth career
- Olimpo de Bahía Blanca

Senior career*
Years	Team	Apps	(Gls)
2006–2012	Banfield	47	(3)
2010–2011	→ Limassol (loan)	4	(0)
2012	→ Barueri (loan)	0	(0)
2012–2013	Olimpo	11	(1)
2013–2014	UTA Arad	19	(6)
2014	Unión	8	(0)
2014	UTA Arad	5	(1)
2014–2015	Olimpia Satu Mare	11	(1)
2015–2016	Douglas Haig	31	(5)
2016	Brown de Adrogue	0	(0)
2016–2017	Freamunde	7	(0)
2017	Târgu Mureș	7	(0)
2018–2019	Talleres-RE	28	(1)
2019–	San Telmo	4	(0)
- * Club domestic league appearances and goals as of 00:14, 16 September 2019 (UTC)

Maximiliano Andres Laso (born 17 February 1988 in Buenos Aires) or simply known as Maxi Laso, is an Argentine footballer who plays for Club Atlético San Telmo.
