= Kritsada Nonchai =

Thai footballer

Personal information
- Full name: Kritsada Nonchai
- Date of birth: 2 February 1989 (age 37)
- Place of birth: Khon Kaen, Thailand
- Height: 1.85 m (6 ft 1 in)
- Position: Goalkeeper

Team information
- Current team: Phitsanulok
- Number: 1

Senior career*
Years	Team	Apps	(Gls)
2009	TOT		
2010–2011	Phrae United		
2012	Roi Et		
2013	Chiangmai		
2015	Police Tero		
2015	→ Chiangmai (loan)		
2015	Bangkok		
2018–2019	Ratchaburi	3	(0)
2020	Chiangrai City	1	(0)
2020–	Phitsanulok	18	(0)
- * Club domestic league appearances and goals as of 23 April 2022

Kritsada Nonchai (Thai: กฤษฏา โนนชัย, born February 2, 1989) is a Thai professional footballer who plays as a goalkeeper.
