= Anan Buasang =

Thai professional footballer

Personal information
- Full name: Anan Buasang
- Date of birth: 30 September 1992 (age 34)
- Place of birth: Khon Kaen, Thailand
- Height: 1.87 m (6 ft 1 1/2 in)
- Position: Forward

Youth career
- 2009–2011: Bangkok Glass

Senior career*
Years	Team	Apps	(Gls)
2012–2013	Rangsit	30	(17)
2013	→ Ayutthaya (loan)	2	(1)
2013–2015	Bangkok Glass	13	(1)
2016–2017	Buriram United	5	(0)
2017	→ Prachuap (loan)	2	(0)
2018	Chainat Hornbill	1	(0)
Total		53	(19)
- * Club domestic league appearances and goals as of 22 June 2016

Anan Buasang (Thai: อนันต์ บัวแสง, born 30 September 1992), is a Thai former professional footballer who played as a forward.

== Honours ==
=== Clubs ===
Bangkok Glass

- Thai FA Cup: 2014

Buriram United

- Kor Royal Cup: 2016
