= Ekkapoom Potharungroj =

Thai footballer (born 1985)

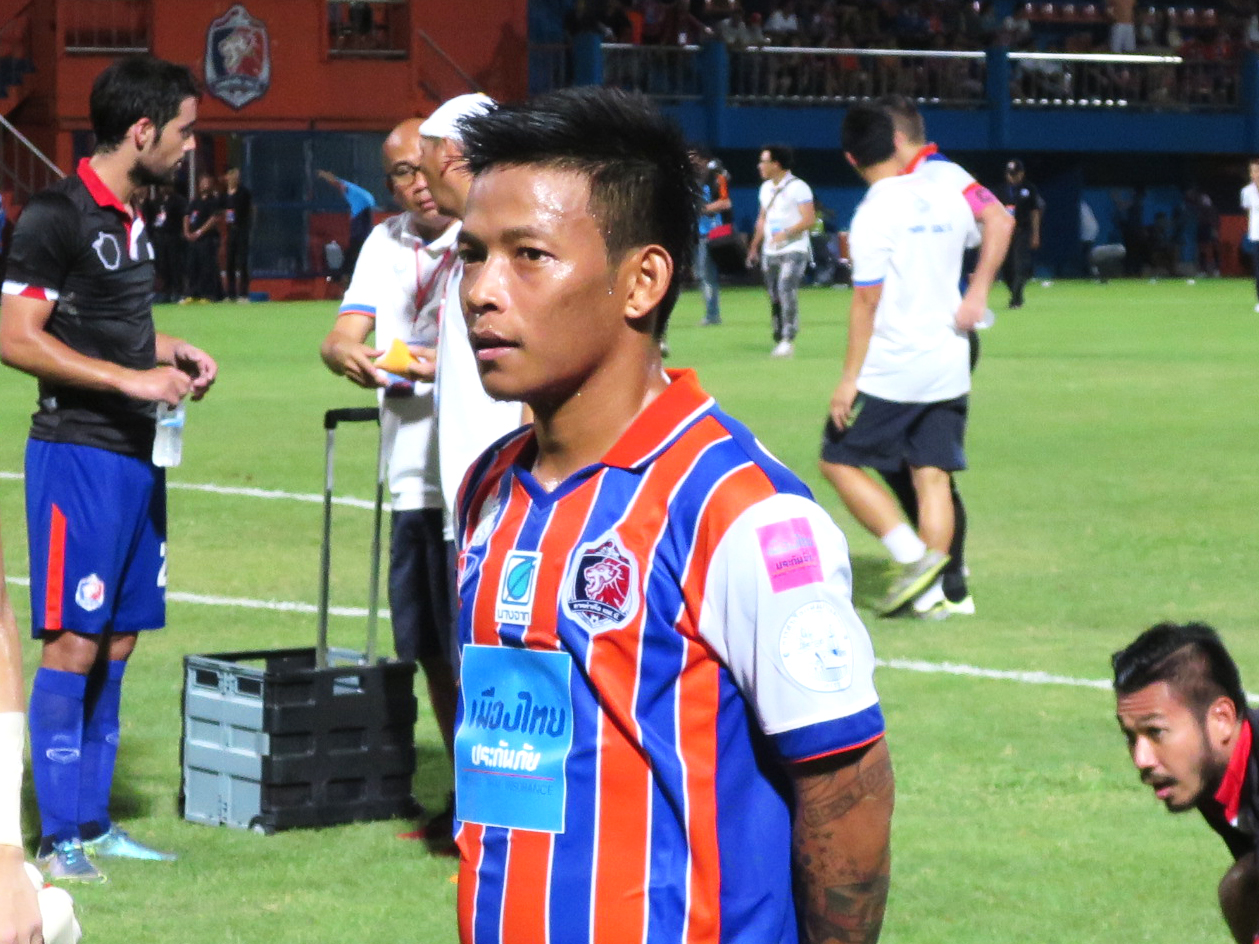

Personal information
- Full name: Ekkapoom Potharungroj
- Date of birth: 29 March 1985 (age 41)
- Place of birth: Ratchaburi, Thailand
- Height: 1.65 m (5 ft 5 in)
- Position: Winger

Youth career
- 2005: Ratchaburi

Senior career*
Years	Team	Apps	(Gls)
2006–2007	Ratchaburi	36	(8)
2008	Osotsapa	19	(2)
2009	Nakhon Pathom	29	(5)
2010	Samut Songkhram	13	(0)
2010–2011	Thai Port	23	(6)
2012	Muangthong United	10	(3)
2013	Ratchaburi Mitr Phol	5	(0)
2014–2015	BEC Tero Sasana	8	(1)
2015	→ Port (loan)	31	(2)
2016–2017	Port	24	(2)
2018	Air Force Central	15	(0)
2019–2021	Nakhon Pathom United	22	(14)
Total		235	(43)
- * Club domestic league appearances and goals as of 21 June 2015

Ekkapoom Potharungroj (Thai: เอกภูมิ โพธารุ่งโรจน์; born March 29, 1985) is a Thai retired professional footballer who plays as a winger.

== Honours ==
=== Club ===
Thai Port

- Thai League Cup winner (1) : 2010

Muangthong United

- Thai League 1 Champions (1): 2012

BEC Tero Sasana

- Thai League Cup winner (1) : 2014
