= Kaio (footballer, born 1987) =

Brazilian footballer (born 1987)

Personal information
- Full name: Kaio Felipe Gonçalves
- Date of birth: 6 July 1987 (age 39)
- Place of birth: Curitiba, Brazil
- Height: 1.87 m (6 ft 2 in)
- Positions: Forward; attacking midfielder

Youth career
- 1995–2000: J.Malucelli
- 2000–2004: Paraná

Senior career*
Years	Team	Apps	(Gls)
2005–2010	Atlético Paranaense	5	(0)
2007	→ Guanabara (loan)		
2008–2009	→ Cerezo Osaka (loan)	53	(18)
2010	→ Yokohama FC (loan)	17	(6)
2011–2013	Yokohama FC	55	(19)
2013–2014	Al Wasl	0	(0)
2014	→ Jeonbuk Hyundai (loan)	32	(9)
2015	Suwon Samsung Bluewings	21	(4)
2016	Buriram United	22	(5)
2017	Yunnan Lijiang	9	(2)
2018	Kyoto Sanga FC	15	(4)
2019	Emirates	7	(1)
2021	Oeste	15	(1)
2022	Paraná	0	(0)
Total		239	(68)
- * Club domestic league appearances and goals as of September 2019

Kaio Felipe Gonçalves or simply Kaio (born July 6, 1987) is a Brazilian professional footballer who plays as a striker. He is currently a free agent.

== Career ==
He made his professional debut in a 2-1 victory over Iraty in the Campeonato Paranaense on January 21, 2007.

On 4 June 2013, Kaio joined UAE Pro-League side Al Wasl FC, ending a 3-year stint at Yokohama FC in Japan.

In 2015, Kaio joined K League Classic in Korea side Suwon Samsung Bluewings

In January 2016, Kaio signed for Buriram United in the Thai League T1.

== Club statistics ==
As of 27 June 2021

Club	Season	League			State League		Cup		League Cup		Continental		Other		Total	
Club	Season	Division	Apps	Goals	Apps	Goals	Apps	Goals	Apps	Goals	Apps	Goals	Apps	Goals	Apps	Goals
Athletico Paranaense	2007	Série A	3	0			0	0	—		0	0	—		3	0
Athletico Paranaense	2008	Série A	2	0			0	0	—		—		—		2	0
Athletico Paranaense	Total		5	0			0	0	—		0	0	—		5	0
Cerezo Osaka (loan)	2008	J2 League	16	8	—		2	0	—		—		—		18	8
Cerezo Osaka (loan)	2009	J2 League	37	10	—		1	0	—		—		—		38	10
Cerezo Osaka (loan)	Total		53	18	—		3	0	—		—		—		56	18
Yokohama FC (loan)	2010	J2 League	17	6	—		2	1	—		—		—		19	7
Yokohama FC	2011	J2 League	29	9	—		1	0	—		—		—		30	9
Yokohama FC	2012	J2 League	25	10	—		2	1	—		—		1	0	28	11
Yokohama FC	Total		71	25	—		5	2	—		—		1	0	77	27
Jeonbuk Hyundai Motors (loan)	2014	K League 1	32	9	—		3	4	—		6	0	—		41	13
Suwon Samsung Bluewings	2015	K League 1	21	4	—		1	0	—		6	1	—		28	5
Buriram United	2016	Thai League 1	22	5	—		0	0			5	0	1	0	28	5
Yunnan Lijiang	2017	China League One	9	2	—		0	0	—		—		—		9	2
Kyoto Sanga	2018	J2 League	15	4	—		—		—		—		—		15	4
Emirates	2018–19	UAE Pro League	7	1	—		—		—		—		—		7	1
Oeste	2021	Série C	4	0	11	1	—		—		—		—		15	1
Paraná	2022	Série D	0	0	—		—		—		—		—		0	0
Career total			239	68	11	1	12	6	0	0	17	1	2	0	281	76
