= Anon San-Mhard =

Thai footballer (born 1991)

Personal information
- Full name: Anon San-Mhard
- Date of birth: 3 July 1991 (age 35)
- Place of birth: Songkhla, Thailand
- Height: 1.75 m (5 ft 9 in)
- Position: Left winger

Team information
- Current team: Nara United
- Number: 7

Senior career*
Years	Team	Apps	(Gls)
2011	Satun United	6	(1)
2012	Phattalung	12	(2)
2013	Bangkok	27	(12)
2013–2016	BEC Tero Sasana	13	(1)
2014	→ BCC Tero (loan)	19	(4)
2015	→ Songkhla United (loan)	10	(1)
2017	Bangkok	12	(0)
2017	Super Power Samut Prakan	3	(0)
2017–2018	Krabi		
2024–	Nara United		

International career
2013	Thailand U 23	6	(3)
- * Club domestic league appearances and goals as of 09:25, 2 September 2017 (UTC)

Anon San-Mhard (Thai อานนท์ สันหมาด; born July 3, 1991) is a Thai footballer who plays for Nara United in Thai League 3. He is a former left winger.

== Honours ==
International
U-23

- BIDC Cup 2013; Winner
