= Chaiwat Nak-iem =

Thai footballer

Personal information
- Full name: Chaiwat Nak-iem
- Date of birth: 18 July 1978 (age 48)
- Place of birth: Bangkok, Thailand
- Height: 1.89 m (6 ft 2 1/2 in)
- Position: Centre back

Senior career*
Years	Team	Apps	(Gls)
1998–2016	Army United	163	(20)
2017	Royal Thai Army	25	(2)
Total		188	(22)

International career^{‡}
2012–2013	Thailand	3	(0)
- * Club domestic league appearances and goals as of 07:38, 17 September 2017 (UTC) ‡ National team caps and goals as of 07:38, 17 September 2017 (UTC)

Chaiwat Nak-iem (Thai: ชัยวัฒน์ นาคเอี่ยม, born July 18, 1978) is a Thai retired professional footballer who played as a defender.

== International career ==
In 2012 Chaiwat was called up to the national team by Winfried Schäfer to the 2014 FIFA World Cup qualification – AFC third round.

=== International ===
As of 12 November 2015

National team	Year	Apps	Goals
Thailand	2012	3	0
Thailand	2013	0	0
Thailand	Total	3	0

== Honours ==
=== Club ===
Army United

- Thai Division 1 League: 2004-05
