= Adisak Sensom-Eiad =

Thai footballer (born 1994)

Personal information
- Full name: Adisak Sensom-Eiad
- Date of birth: 11 December 1994 (age 31)
- Place of birth: Songkhla, Thailand
- Height: 1.77 m (5 ft 9 1/2 in)
- Position: Defender

Team information
- Current team: Nakhon Si United
- Number: 18

Youth career
- 2010–2012: Bangkok Cristian College

Senior career*
Years	Team	Apps	(Gls)
2013–2015	BEC Tero Sasana	7	(0)
2013–2014	→ BCC Tero (loan)	36	(3)
2015	→ Bangkok (loan)	14	(0)
2016	Ubon UMT United	10	(0)
2016–2017	Buriram United	6	(0)
2017	→ Nongbua Pitchaya (loan)	9	(0)
2018–2019	Thai Honda	20	(0)
2020–2021	Sisaket	24	(2)
2021–	Nakhon Si United	53	(12)

International career
2011–2012	Thailand U19	3	(0)
2015–2016	Thailand U23	4	(0)
- * Club domestic league appearances and goals as of 30 April 2023

Adisak Sensom-Eiad (Thai: อดิศักดิ์ เส็นสมเอียด), simply known as Max (Thai: แม็ก), is a Thai professional footballer.

== Honours ==
=== Club ===
Buriram United

- Thai League Cup (1): 2016
