= Apiwat Ngaolamhin =

Thai footballer (born 1986)

Personal information
- Full name: Apiwat Ngaolamhin
- Date of birth: 1 June 1986 (age 40)
- Place of birth: Bangkok, Thailand
- Height: 1.86 m (6 ft 1 in)
- Position: Centre-back

Youth career
- 1998–2003: Patumkongka School
- 2004–2007: Chulalongkorn University

Senior career*
Years	Team	Apps	(Gls)
2008–2010	BBCU	31	(2)
2011–2012	Samut Songkhram	28	(2)
2013	BEC Tero Sasana	26	(1)
2014–2018	Ratchaburi Mitr Phol	114	(6)
2018–2022	Buriram United	49	(2)
Total		248	(13)

International career
2013	Thailand	3	(0)
- * Club domestic league appearances and goals as of 22 June 2008

Apiwat Ngaolamhin (Thai: อภิวัฒน์ งั่วลำหิน, born June 1, 1986) is a Thai retired professional footballer who plays as a centre-back.

== International career ==
In June 2013, Apiwat debuted for Thailand against North Korea in a friendly match.

=== International ===
As of 12 November 2015

National team	Year	Apps	Goals
Thailand	2013	3	0
Thailand	Total	3	0

== Honours ==
=== Club ===
Buriram United

- Thai League 1 (2): 2018, 2021–22
- Thai FA Cup (1): 2021–22
- Thai League Cup (1): 2021–22
- Thailand Champions Cup (1): 2019
