= Sarif Sainui =

Thai footballer (born 1980)

Personal information
- Full name: Sarif Sainui
- Date of birth: 15 April 1980 (age 46)
- Place of birth: Krabi, Thailand
- Height: 1.74 m (5 ft 8 1/2 in)
- Position: Striker

Youth career
- 1998–2001: Bangkok University

Senior career*
Years	Team	Apps	(Gls)
2002–2004	Bangkok United	42	(22)
2005–2006	Kelantan FA	26	(13)
2007–2010	Bangkok United	80	(27)
2011–2012	Buriram PEA	13	(6)
2013	BEC Tero Sasana	9	(1)
2014–2015	Samut Songkhram	27	(5)
2015	Angthong	10	(2)
Total		207	(76)

International career
2003–2004	Thailand	2	(1)

Managerial career
- 2016–2017: Angthong (assistant)
- 2018–: Bangkok United (assistant)
- * Club domestic league appearances and goals as of 1 June 2013

Sarif Sainui (Thai: ซารีฟ สายนุ้ย, born April 15, 1980) is a Thai retired professional footballer who played as a striker and current assistant coach of Thai League 1 club Bangkok United.

== International career ==
Sarif played for the Thailand national team. He played 2 games and scored one goals

== International goals ==
#	Date	Venue	Opponent	Score	Result	Competition
1.	16 December 2004	KLFA Stadium, Kuala Lumpur, Malaysia	Philippines	2–1	3–1	2004 Tiger Cup

== Honours ==
=== Club ===
Bangkok University

- Thailand Division 1 League (1): 2002-03

Buriram United

- Thai Premier League (1): 2011
- Thai FA Cup (2): 2011, 2012
- Thai League Cup (2): 2011, 2012
