= Dawuth Dinkhet =

Thai footballer (born 1983)

Personal information
- Full name: Dawuth Dinkhet
- Date of birth: 22 November 1983 (age 42)
- Place of birth: Ratchaburi, Thailand
- Height: 1.75 m (5 ft 9 in)
- Position: Left back

Youth career
- 1998–2000: Darunaratchaburi School

Senior career*
Years	Team	Apps	(Gls)
2001–2005	Ratchaburi	29	(0)
2006–2019	Army United	219	(3)
2020–	Royal Thai Army	43	(0)
- * Club domestic league appearances and goals as of 19 March 2023

Dawuth Dinkhet (Thai: ดาวุฒิ ดินเขต, born November 18, 1983) simply known as Wut (Thai: วุฒิ) is a Thai retired professional footballer who played as a left back.
