= Apichet Puttan =

Thai footballer (born 1978)

Personal information
- Full name: Apichet Puttan
- Date of birth: 10 August 1978 (age 48)
- Place of birth: Samut Prakan, Thailand
- Height: 1.73 m (5 ft 8 in)
- Position: Right back

Youth career
- 2000–2002: Rajpracha

Senior career*
| Years | Team | Apps | (Gls) |
| 2003–2004 | Rajpracha | 38 | (0) |
| 2005 | Thailand Tobacco Monopoly | 22 | (1) |
| 2006–2012 | Buriram PEA | 135 | (6) |
| 2012–2016 | BEC Tero Sasana | 80 | (0) |
| 2017 | Army United | 12 | (0) |
| Total | | 287 | (7) |

International career^{‡}
| 1996–1997 | Thailand U17 | 12 | (0) |
| 2003–2012 | Thailand | 7 | (1) |
- * Club domestic league appearances and goals as of 07:45, 8 November 2017 (UTC) ‡ National team caps and goals as of 29 February 2012

Apichet Puttan (Thai: อภิเชษฐ์ พุฒตาล, born August 10, 1978), is a Thai retired professional footballer who played as a right back.

After retired at the age of 39, he switched to being a manager.

== International career ==
Apichet has played 6 games for the national team and scored one goal. He first made his debut against Iraq in a friendly in 2006. In 2012, he called up by the Thai National Team to the 2012 King's Cup and played a match.

== International goals ==
| # | Date | Venue | Opponent | Score | Result | Competition |
|---|---|---|---|---|---|---|
| 1. | February 16, 2006 | Ayutthaya, Thailand | Iraq | 4-3 | Won | Friendly |

== Honours ==
=== Club ===
Thailand Tobacco Monopoly

- Thai Premier League (1): 2004-05

Buriram United

- Thai Premier League (2): 2008, 2011
- Thai FA Cup (2): 2011, 2012
- Thai League Cup (2): 2011, 2012
