= Nukoolkit Krutyai =

Thai footballer (born 1992)

Personal information
- Full name: Nukoolkit Krutyai
- Date of birth: 23 September 1992 (age 34)
- Place of birth: Prachuap Khiri Khan, Thailand
- Height: 1.77 m (5 ft 9 1/2 in)
- Position: Centre-back

Team information
- Current team: Maejo United
- Number: 5

Youth career
- 2009–2011: BEC Tero Sasana

Senior career*
Years	Team	Apps	(Gls)
2011–2014	BEC Tero Sasana	2	(0)
2015–2016	Buriram United	16	(0)
2016–2017	Ubon UMT United	1	(0)
2017–2019	Muangthong United	13	(0)
2019	→ Trat (loan)	26	(0)
2020–2021	Sukhothai	30	(1)
2021	→ Ratchaburi Mitr Phol (loan)	0	(0)
2021–2023	PT Prachuap	23	(1)
2023–2024	Chiangmai	34	(0)
2024–2025	Phrae United	29	(1)
2025–2026	Phrae United	33	(0)
2026–	Maejo United	0	(0)
- * Club domestic league appearances and goals as of 5 October 2026

Nukoolkit Krutyai (Thai: นุกูลกิจ ครุฑใหญ่; born September 23, 1992) is a Thai professional footballer who plays as a centre-back for Thai League 3 club Maejo United.

== Honours ==
=== Club ===
BEC Tero Sasana

- Thai League Cup
  - Winner (1) : 2014

Buriram United

- Thai League 1
  - Champions (1) : 2015
- Thai FA Cup
  - Winners (1) : 2015
- Thai League Cup
  - Winners (1) : 2015
- Toyota Premier Cup
  - Winner (1) : 2016
- Kor Royal Cup
  - Winners (2) : 2015, 2016
- Mekong Club Championship
  - Winner (1) : 2015

Muangthong United

- Thai League Cup
  - Winners (1) : 2017
- Mekong Club Championship
  - Winner (1) : 2017
