= Belux Bukasa Kasongo =

Congolese footballer

Bukasa Kasonga
Personal information
- Full name: Belux Bukasa Kasongo
- Date of birth: 13 August 1979 (age 47)
- Place of birth: Kananga, Zaire
- Position: Midfielder

Senior career*
Years	Team	Apps	(Gls)
2001–2002	AS Vita Club		
2002	SKA Rostov-na-Donu	3	(0)
2003	AS Vita Club	27	(1)
2003–2004	Ajax Cape Town	10	(0)
2004–2006	Silver Stars	21	(1)
2006–2013	AmaZulu F.C.	130	(3)
2013–2014	BEC Tero Sasana	38	(1)

International career^{‡}
2001–2011	DR Congo	11	(1)
- * Club domestic league appearances and goals as of 2015 ‡ National team caps and goals as of 2015

Belux Bukasa Kasongo (born 13 August 1979) is a retired Congolese footballer. After his playing career, Belux became a coach while completing his CAF D licence. He is currently coaching at the AmaZulu Academy.

== Career statistics ==
=== International ===
Scores and results list DR Congo's goal tally first, score column indicates score after each Kasongo goal.

List of international goals scored by Belux Bukasa Kasongo
No.	Date	Venue	Opponent	Score	Result	Competition	Ref.
1	24 October 2001	Sheikh Amri Abeid Memorial Stadium, Arusha, Tanzania	Tanzania	2–1	2–2	Friendly	
