= Sho Shimoji =

Japanese footballer

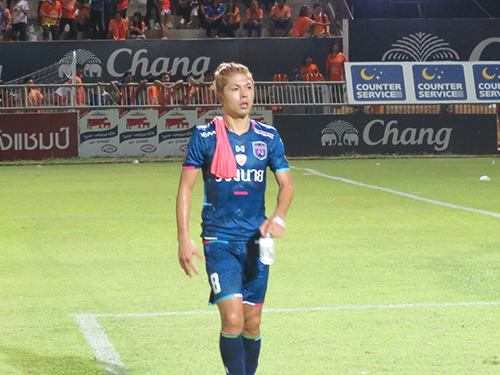
- 2016

Personal information
- Full name: Sho Shimoji
- Date of birth: August 2, 1985 (age 41)
- Place of birth: Okinawa, Japan
- Height: 1.71 m (5 ft 7 1/2 in)
- Position: Midfielder

Youth career
- 2001–2003: Tokyo Verdy

College career
Years	Team	Apps	(Gls)
2004–2007	Aoyama Gakuin University		

Senior career*
Years	Team	Apps	(Gls)
2008–2010	Sagan Tosu	42	(1)
2011	Sportivo Luqueño	1	(0)
2011	Linense	0	(0)
2012	Águia Negra	19	(1)
2013–2014	BEC Tero Sasana	51	(27)
2015	Police United	13	(7)
2016	Chainat Hornbill	29	(9)
2017–2019	Udon Thani	56	(10)
2022–2024	Samut Prakan City	48	(7)
- * Club domestic league appearances and goals as of 30 April 2024

Sho Shimoji (下地 奨, Shimoji Shō; born August 2, 1985) is a Japanese professional football player.

== Club statistics ==
Club performance			League		Cup		Total	
Season	Club	League	Apps	Goals	Apps	Goals	Apps	Goals
Japan			League		Emperor's Cup		Total	
2008	Sagan Tosu	J2 League	9	0	0	0	9	0
2009	Sagan Tosu	J2 League	18	0	1	0	19	0
2010	Sagan Tosu	J2 League	14	1	0	0	14	1
Country	Japan		41	1	1	0	42	1
Total			41	1	1	0	42	1
