= 2023–24 Bangkok United F.C. season =

Bangkok United F.C.
2023–24 season
- Chairman: Kajorn Chearavanont
- Manager: Totchtawan Sripan
- Stadium: Thammasat Stadium, Khlong Luang, Pathum Thani, Thailand
- Thai League: 2nd
- FA Cup: Winners
- League Cup: Second round
- Champions Cup: Winners
- AFC Champions League: Round of 16
- Top goalscorer: League: Willen (20); All: Willen (26)

The 2023–24 season is Bangkok United Football Club's 15th in the new era since they took over from Bangkok University Football Club in 2009. It is the 8th season in the Thai League and the club's 13th (10th consecutive) season in the top flight of the Thai football league system since returning in the 2013 season.

== Squad ==
As of 2 August 2023.

Squad No.	Name	Nationality	Position(s)	Date of birth (age)	Last club
Goalkeepers
1	Patiwat Khammai	(Thailand)	GK	24 December 1994 (age 31)	(Thailand) Samut Prakan City F.C.
34	Warut Mekmusik	(Thailand)	GK	21 February 1992 (age 33)	(Thailand) Air Force United F.C.
52	Supanut Suadsong	(Thailand)	GK	21 February 1992 (age 33)	Youth Team
Defenders
2	Peerapat Notchaiya	(Thailand)	LB / LWB	4 February 1993 (age 32)	(Thailand) Muangthong United F.C.
3	Everton Gonçalves (C)	(Brazil)	CB	5 February 1990 (age 35)	(Thailand) Chiangrai United F.C.
4	Manuel Bihr	(Thailand) (Germany)	CB	17 August 1993 (age 32)	(Germany) Stuttgarter Kickers
5	Putthinan Wannasri	(Thailand)	CB / RB / LB	5 September 1992 (age 33)	(Thailand) Suphanburi F.C.
6	Nitipong Selanon	(Thailand)	RB	25 May 1993 (age 32)	(Thailand) Chiangrai United F.C.
24	Wanchai Jarunongkran	(Thailand)	LB	18 December 1996 (age 29)	(Thailand) Police Tero F.C.
26	Suphan Thongsong	(Thailand)	CB	26 August 1994 (age 31)	(Thailand) Suphanburi F.C.
96	Boontawee Theppawong	(Thailand)	RB	2 January 1996 (age 30)	(Thailand) Muangthong United F.C.
Midfielders
7	Anon Amornlerdsak	(Thailand)	RW / LW / AM	6 November 1997 (age 28)	(Thailand) Bangkok Glass F.C.
8	Wisarut Imura	(Thailand)	CM / DM	18 October 1997 (age 28)	(Thailand) Air Force United F.C.
10	Bassel Jradi	(Lebanon)	CM / AM	6 July 1993 (age 32)	(Cyprus) Apollon Limassol FC
11	Rungrath Poomchantuek	(Thailand)	RW / LW	17 May 1992 (age 33)	(Thailand) Ratchaburi Mitr Phol F.C.
17	Tassanapong Muaddarak	(Thailand)	CM / DM	12 January 1991 (age 35)	(Thailand) Nongbua Pitchaya F.C.
18	Thitiphan Puangchan	(Thailand)	CM	1 September 1993 (age 32)	(Thailand) BG Pathum United F.C.
21	Chayathorn Tapsuvanavon	(Thailand)	CM / DM	12 March 2000 (age 25)	Youth Team
27	Weerathep Pomphan	(Thailand)	CM / DM	19 September 1996 (age 29)	(Thailand) Muangthong United F.C.
28	Thossawat Limwannasathian	(Thailand)	CM / DM	17 May 1993 (age 32)	(Thailand) Muangthong United F.C.
30	Ratchanat Arunyapairot	(Thailand)	CM	22 June 1996 (age 29)	(Thailand) Suphanburi F.C.
39	Pokklaw Anan	(Thailand)	CM / AM	4 March 1991 (age 34)	(Thailand) Chonburi F.C.
90	Vander Luiz	(Brazil)	RW / LW / AM	17 April 1990 (age 35)	(Thailand) Chiangrai United F.C.
Strikers
20	Guntapon Keereeleang	(Thailand)	FW / SS	22 January 2001 (age 25)	Youth Team
22	Adisak Kraisorn	(Thailand)	FW / SS	2 January 1991 (age 35)	(Malaysia) Terengganu FC
29	Willen	(Brazil)	FW / SS / LW	10 January 1992 (age 34)	(Thailand) PT Prachuap F.C.
36	Chayawat Srinawong	(Thailand)	FW / SS	12 January 1993 (age 33)	(Thailand) Samut Prakan City F.C.
93	Mahmoud Eid	(Palestine)	FW	26 June 1993 (age 32)	(Thailand) Nongbua Pitchaya F.C.
94	Amadou Soukouna	(France)	FW / AM	21 June 1992 (age 33)	(South Africa) Maritzburg United F.C.
Players loaned out / left during season

== Competitions ==
=== Overview ===
Competition	First match	Last match	Starting round	Final position	Record							
Competition	First match	Last match	Starting round	Final position	Pld	W	D	L	GF	GA	GD	Win %
Thai League	12 August 2023	26 May 2024	Matchday 1	2nd	30	17	10	3	58	24	+34	56.67
FA Cup	1 November 2023	15 June 2024	First Round	Winners	6	4	2	0	14	3	+11	66.67
League Cup	6 December 2023	13 March 2024	First Round	Second Round	2	1	0	1	3	1	+2	50.00
Champions Cup	5 August 2023		Final	Winners	1	1	0	0	2	0	+2	100.00
AFC Champions League	20 September 2023	21 February 2024	Group stage	Round of 16	8	4	2	2	13	11	+2	50.00
Total					47	27	14	6	90	39	+51	57.45

Last updated: 15 June 2024
Source: Competitions

=== Thai League ===
==== League table ====
Pos	Team	Pld	W	D	L	GF	GA	GD	Pts	Qualification
1	Buriram United (C, Q)	30	20	9	1	70	27	+43	69	Qualification for AFC Champions League Elite League stage
2	Bangkok United (Q)	30	17	10	3	58	24	+34	61	Qualification for AFC Champions League Elite Qualifying play-off
3	Port (Q)	30	16	9	5	72	37	+35	57	Qualification for AFC Champions League Two group stage
4	BG Pathum United	30	15	9	6	59	38	+21	54	
5	Muangthong United (Note: Qualified for the Champions League Two group stage due to Đông Á Thanh Hóa's withdrawal from the competition and BG Pathum United's decision not to participate.) (Q)	30	16	4	10	64	45	+19	52	Qualification for AFC Champions League Two group stage

Updated to match(es) played on 26 May 2024. Source: Thai League
Rules for classification: Season in progress: 1) Points; 2) Goal difference; 3) Goals scored; End of season: 1) Points; 2) Head-to-head points; 3) Head-to-head goal difference; 4) Goals scored.
(C) Champions; (Q) Qualified for the phase indicated

==== Results overview ====
Overall								Home						Away					
Pld	W	D	L	GF	GA	GD	Pts	W	D	L	GF	GA	GD	W	D	L	GF	GA	GD
30	17	10	3	58	24	+34	61	8	6	1	34	9	+25	9	4	2	24	15	+9

Matchday	1	2	3	4	5	6	7	8	9	10	11	12	13	14	15	16	17	18	19	20	21	22	23	24	25	26	27	28	29	30
Ground	A	H	A	H	H	H	H	A	H	A	H	A	H	A	H	A	H	A	A	A	A	H	A	H	A	H	A	H	A	H
Result	W	D	W	W	W	L	W	D	W	W	D	W	W	W	D	W	D	D	D	L	W	W	W	D	W	D	D	W	L	W
Position	1	2	1	1	1	2	2	3	2	1	1	1	1	1	1	1	1	2	3	3	2	2	2	2	2	2	2	2	2	2

A = Away; H = Home; W = Win; D = Draw; L = Loss

==== Matches ====
12 August 2023 1	Uthai Thani	1–4	True Bangkok United	Uthai Thani
19.00 UTC+7	Ricardo (yellow card) 47'; Mbah (yellow card) 67', (goal) 90+2'; Nitipong (yellow card) 90+3'	Report	Mahmoud 23,89', (yellow card) 43'; Suphan (yellow card) 37'; Thitiphan (yellow card) 38'; Nitipong 53'; Willen 81' (pen.)	Stadium: Uthai Thani Province Stadium; Attendance: 3,154; Referee: Phairot Bunkamnoed

19 August 2023 2	True Bangkok United	0–0	Muangthong United	Pathum Thani
18.00 UTC+7	Thitiphan (yellow card) 64'	Report	Chatchai (yellow card) 62'; Picha (yellow card) 75'	Stadium: True Stadium; Attendance: 5,283; Referee: Visavet Sangnakorn

25 August 2023 3	Lamphun Warriors	0–2	True Bangkok United	Lamphun
19.00 UTC+7	Baworn (yellow card) 25'; Maung Lwin (yellow card) 45+5'; Mika (yellow card) 53'	Report	Pokklaw 45+3,81'; Nitipong (yellow card) 69'	Stadium: Mae Guang Stadium; Attendance: 3,129; Referee: Akom Chareonsuk

15 September 2023 4	True Bangkok United	3–0	Sukhothai	Pathum Thani
20.00 UTC+7	Peerapat (yellow card) 45+1'; Mahmoud 47'; Rungrath 55'; Jradi 85'	Report	Lursan (yellow card) 26'; Bonilla (yellow card) 33'; Piyarat (yellow card) 43'; Chaowasit (yellow card) 83'	Stadium: True Stadium; Attendance: 1,533; Referee: Songkran Bunmeekiart

25 September 2023 5	True Bangkok United	2–0	BG Pathum United	Pathum Thani
20.00 UTC+7	Willen 69,90+2'	Report		Stadium: True Stadium; Attendance: 4,041; Referee: Torphong Somsing

6 January 2024 6	True Bangkok United	0–1	Buriram United	Pathum Thani
19.00 UTC+7	Thossawat (yellow card) 18' (yellow-red card) 90+7'; Mahmoud (yellow card) 56'; Wisarut (yellow card) 58'; Peerapat (yellow card) 73'	Report	Ratthanakorn (yellow card) 88'; Čaušić 90+1', (yellow card) 90+2'	Stadium: True Stadium; Attendance: 9,132; Referee: Sarayut Jakngoen

8 October 2023 7	True Bangkok United	2–1	Chiangrai United	Pathum Thani
19.00 UTC+7	Mahmoud (yellow card) 40', (goal) 78'; Boontawee (yellow card) 90+1'; Peerapat (yellow card) 90+2'; Everton 90+2', (yellow card) 90+4'	Report	Thakdanai (yellow card) 23' (yellow-red card) 44'; Bill 45' (pen.); Atikun (yellow card) 90'	Stadium: True Stadium; Attendance: 2,141; Referee: Chaireag Ngamsom

28 December 2023 8	Chonburi	0–0	True Bangkok United	Chonburi
19.00 UTC+7		Report	Nitipong (yellow card) 8'; Thossawat (yellow card) 55'; Everton (yellow card) 75'	Stadium: Chonburi Stadium; Attendance: 4,259; Referee: Niwat Insa-ard

29 October 2023 9	True Bangkok United	3–1	Ratchaburi	Pathum Thani
19.00 UTC+7	Pokklaw (yellow card) 52'; Bihr (yellow card) 83'; Mahmoud 85'; Everton 90+2'; Peerapat (yellow card) 90+2'; Chayawat 90+8'	Report	Jakkaphan 45'; Sio (yellow card) 53'; Adisorn (yellow card) 77'	Stadium: True Stadium; Attendance: 2,585; Referee: Mongkolchai Pechsri

4 November 2023 10	Port	0–2	True Bangkok United	Bangkok
18.00 UTC+7	Tardeli (yellow card) 52'; Chalermsak (yellow card) 78'	Report	Rungrath 6'; Willen 90+4'	Stadium: PAT Stadium; Attendance: 5,093; Referee: Songkran Bunmeekiart

24 November 2023 11	True Bangkok United	1–1	Nakhon Pathom United	Pathum Thani
19.00 UTC+7	Everton (yellow card) 14'; Willen 58' (pen.); Jradi (yellow card) 82'; Chayawat (yellow card) 90+4'	Report	Chegini 90+6'	Stadium: True Stadium; Attendance: 1,448; Referee: Chaireag Ngamsom

3 December 2023 12	PT Prachuap	0–1	True Bangkok United	Prachuap Khiri Khan
19.00 UTC+7	Tamer (yellow card) 51'	Report	Peerapat (yellow card) 51'; Rungrath 84'; Jradi (yellow card) 90+6'	Stadium: Sam Ao Stadium; Attendance: 2,570; Referee: Natee Choosuwan

9 December 2023 13	True Bangkok United	4–0	Khon Kaen United	Pathum Thani
18.00 UTC+7	Pokklaw (yellow card) 30'; Willen 37,43,83'; Jradi 41'	Report	Panupong (yellow card) 18'; Saksit (yellow card) 87'	Stadium: True Stadium; Attendance: 1,523; Referee: Wiwat Jumpaoon

17 December 2023 14	Trat	1–2	True Bangkok United	Trat
19.00 UTC+7	Jorge (yellow card) 57'; Rangsan (yellow card) 72'; Nattawut 75'; Thanaset (yellow card) 80'; Yashir (yellow card) 90+8'	Report	Willen 61' (pen.); Mahmoud 90+1'	Stadium: Trat Province Stadium; Attendance: 1,995; Referee: Sapuding Kalong

24 December 2023 15	True Bangkok United	1–1	Police Tero	Pathum Thani
18.30 UTC+7	Suphan (yellow card) 23'; Peerapat (yellow card) 57'; Willen 90+3'; Jradi (yellow card) 90+3'	Report	Maxx 4'; Nattawut (yellow card) 32'; Priori (yellow card) 38'; Karikari (yellow card) 45+1'	Stadium: True Stadium; Attendance: 1,896; Referee: Songkran Bunmekiart

9 February 2024 16	Muangthong United	1–2	True Bangkok United	Nonthaburi
19.00 UTC+7	Jaroensak 56'; Billong (yellow card) 70'; Popp (yellow card) 79'	Report	Vander (yellow card) 59'; Everton 75'; Adisak 90+3'; Willen (yellow card) 90+3'	Stadium: Thunderdome Stadium; Attendance: 4,372; Referee: Chaireag Ngamsom

18 April 2024 17	True Bangkok United	2–2	Lamphun Warriors	Pathum Thani
19.00 UTC+7	Peerapat (yellow card) 4'; Mahmoud (yellow card) 8'; Everton 12', (yellow card) 45+2'; Rungrath 36'; Willen (yellow card) 45+1'; Wanchai (yellow card) 66'	Report	Chaiyawat (yellow card) 11'; Akkarapong 22'; Baworn (yellow card) 47'; Anan 62'; Patcharapol (yellow card) 90+5'	Stadium: True Stadium; Attendance: 1,134; Referee: Anusorn Nookaew

17 February 2024 18	Sukhothai	0–0	True Bangkok United	Sukhothai
18.00 UTC+7	Sarawut (yellow card) 34'; Surawich (yellow card) 54'; Baggio (yellow card) 89'; Piyarat (yellow card) 90+6'; Lursan (yellow card) 90+7'	Report	Adisak (yellow card) 14'; Wisarut (yellow card) 45+2'; Weerathep (yellow card) 90+3'; Thossawat (yellow card) 90+7'	Stadium: Thalay Luang Stadium; Attendance: 1,685; Referee: Mongkolchai Pechsri

25 February 2024 19	BG Pathum United	2–2	True Bangkok United	Pathum Thani
18.00 UTC+7	N'Diaye 8'; Danilo 12', (yellow card) 61'; Álvarez (yellow card) 65'; Fandi (yellow card) 76'; Kittipong (yellow card) 88'; Chananan (red card) 90+7'	Report	Weerathep (yellow card) 24'; Pokklaw 45+3'; Peerapat (yellow card) 60'; Wisarut 70'	Stadium: BG Stadium; Attendance: 10,074; Referee: Songkran Bunmeekiart

3 March 2024 20	Buriram United	3–2	True Bangkok United	Buriram
18.00 UTC+7	Guilherme 44,52', (yellow card) 75'; Supachai 77'	Report	Willen 8', 38' (pen.); Nitipong (yellow card) 30'; Patiwat (yellow card) 44'; Chayawat (yellow card) 60'; Pokklaw (yellow card) 69'; Suphan (yellow card) 73'; Vander (yellow card) 76'	Stadium: Chang Arena; Attendance: 24,105; Referee: Songkran Bunmeekiart

9 March 2024 21	Chiangrai United	0–1	True Bangkok United	Chiang Rai
18.00 UTC+7	Atikun (yellow card) 45+2'	Report	Willen 36'; Nitipong (yellow card) 52'; Bihr (yellow card) 90+4'	Stadium: Leo Chiangrai Stadium; Attendance: 3,935; Referee: Chaireag Ngamsom

31 March 2024 22	True Bangkok United	6–0	Chonburi	Pathum Thani
18.30 UTC+7	Jradi 19'; Willen 48,66'; Peerapat 51'; Tassanapong 87'; Thossawat 90+1'	Report	Songchai (yellow card) 65'; Phitak (red card) 82'	Stadium: True Stadium; Attendance: 2,693; Referee: Sahapop Sriboonlue

4 April 2024 23	Ratchaburi	1–2	True Bangkok United	Ratchaburi
18.00 UTC+7	Sanchai 6'; Mateus (yellow card) 45+1'; Hein Phyo Win (yellow card) 90'	Report	Everton (yellow card) 45+3'; Vander 49'; Weerathep (yellow card) 54'; Wanchai (yellow card) 68'; Willen 79', (yellow card) 79'	Stadium: Dragon Solar Park; Attendance: 3,177; Referee: Chaireag Ngam-som

7 April 2024 24	True Bangkok United	2–2	Port	Pathum Thani
18.00 UTC+7	Mahmoud 17'; Bihr (yellow card) 48'; Jradi 62'	Report	Felipe 34,36', (yellow card) 69'; Shimura (yellow card) 90+5'; Somporn (yellow card) 90+6'	Stadium: True Stadium; Attendance: 3,876; Referee: Warintorn Sassadee

21 April 2024 25	Nakhon Pathom United	1–2	True Bangkok United	Nakhon Pathom
19.00 UTC+7	Ablorh 39'	Report	Wanchai (yellow card) 62'; Vander 69'; Everton 90+7'	Stadium: Nakhon Pathom Municipality Sport School Stadium; Attendance: 1,899; Referee: Akom Charoensuk

29 April 2024 26	True Bangkok United	0–0	PT Prachuap	Pathum Thani
18.30 UTC+7	Kritsada (yellow card) 74'	Report	Chutipol (yellow card) 62'; Phon-Ek (yellow card) 62'; Pathomchai (yellow card) 62'	Stadium: True Stadium; Attendance: 1,532; Referee: Niwat Insa-ard

5 May 2024 27	Khon Kaen United	2–2	True Bangkok United	Khon Kaen
17.30 UTC+7	Tawin 70'; Karaboué (yellow card) 75'; Wasan (yellow card) 78'; Brenner 90+5'	Report	Thossawat 27'; Mahmoud 61'; Pokklaw (yellow card) 68'; Suphan (yellow card) 87'; Wanchai (yellow card) 90'; Vander (yellow card) 90+4'	Stadium: Khon Kaen Provincial Administrative Organization Stadium; Attendance: 5,310; Referee: Torphong Somsing

12 May 2024 28	True Bangkok United	5–0	Trat	Pathum Thani
19.00 UTC+7	Willen 34' (pen.), 56,83'; Peerapat (yellow card) 50'; Mahmoud 78'; Rungrath 90+1'; Putthinan (yellow card) 90+6'	Report	Thitawee (yellow card) 20'; Aguinaldo (yellow card) 32'; Santipap (yellow card) 46'; Thanaset (yellow card) 88'	Stadium: True Stadium; Attendance: 1,101; Referee: Warintron Sassadee

17 May 2024 29	Police Tero	3–0	True Bangkok United	Lak Si, Bangkok
19.00 UTC+7	Villanueva 36'; Teerawut (yellow card) 40'; Tsoumou 54'; Natthapat (yellow card) 80'; Islame 83'	Report	Rungrath (yellow card) 43'	Stadium: Boonyachinda Stadium; Attendance: 1,188; Referee: Natee Choosuwan

26 May 2024 30	True Bangkok United	3–0	Uthai Thani	Pathum Thani
18.00 UTC+7	Rungrath 15'; Weerathep (yellow card) 39'; Nitipong 61'; Vander (yellow card) 70'; Willen 90+2' (pen.); Thossawat (yellow card) 90+4'; Wanchai (yellow card) 90+5'	Report	Aung Thu (yellow card) 45+2'; Apichok (yellow card) 89'	Stadium: True Stadium; Attendance: 1,812; Referee: Warintron Sassadee

=== FA Cup ===
1 November 2023 First Round	Nakhon Si United	0–1	True Bangkok United	Nakhon Si Thammarat
17.00 UTC+7	Valdo (yellow card) 47'; Soukaphone (yellow card) 65'	Report	Everton 28'; Soukouna (yellow card) 37'; Warut (yellow card) 87'	Stadium: Nakhon Si Thammarat Province Stadium; Attendance: 1,559; Referee: Wiwat Jumpaoon

20 December 2023 Second Round	True Bangkok United	4–0	Samut Prakan City	Pathum Thani
19.00 UTC+7	Jradi (yellow card) 23', (goal) 31'; Soukouna 26,56'; Boontawee 64'	Report	Kitsarin (yellow card) 86'	Stadium: True Stadium; Attendance: 1,036; Referee: Phairot Bunkamnoed

28 February 2024 Third Round	Songkhla	2–2 (a.e.t.) (4–5 p)	True Bangkok United	Mueang, Songkhla
19.00 UTC+7	Pornthep 51'; Abdulhafis 85'; Muhammadburahan (yellow card) 90+7'; Adan (yellow card) 99'	Report	Kritsada (yellow card) 29'; Rungrath 36'; Everton 68'; Chayawat (yellow card) 84'; Warut (yellow card) 118'	Stadium: Tinsulanon Stadium; Attendance: 7,125; Referee: Sivakorn Pu-udom
	Penalties
	Ekene Victor Azike (penalty scored); Victor Clemente de Oliveira Capinan (penalty scored); Aliu Micheal Abdul (penalty scored); Adam Lassamano (penalty missed); Akrom Mamood (penalty scored)		(penalty scored) Willen; (penalty scored) Thossawat Limwannasathian; (penalty scored) Everton; (penalty scored) Weerathep Pomphan; (penalty scored) Rungrath Poomchantuek

10 April 2024 Quarter-finals	True Bangkok United	1–0	Lamphun Warriors	Pathum Thani
19.00 UTC+7	Willen (yellow card) 85'; Vander 90+5', (yellow card) 90+5'	Report	Todsapol (yellow card) 22'; Negueba (yellow card) 55'; Maung Maung Lwin (yellow card) 85'; Mika (yellow card) 90+12'	Stadium: True Stadium; Attendance: 1,370; Referee: Sivakorn Pu-udom

8 May 2024 Semi-finals	True Bangkok United	5–0	Udon United	Mueang, Chonburi
19.00 UTC+7	Thossawat 22'; Willen 29' (pen.), 72'; Rakpong 37' (o.g.); Rungrath 90+3'	Report	Apisit (yellow card) 60'	Stadium: Chonburi UTA Stadium; Attendance: 462; Referee: wiwat Jumpaoon

15 June 2024 Final	True Bangkok United	1–1 (a.e.t.) (4–1 p)	Dragon Pathumwan Kanchanaburi	Mueang, Ratchaburi
18.00 UTC+7	Thossawat (yellow card) 44'; Pokklaw (yellow card) 45+2'; Vander 74' (pen.); Wanchai (yellow card) 87'; Wisarut (yellow card) 107'	Report	Jirasak (yellow card) 46' (yellow-red card) 71'; Ricardo 65'; Chinnapong (yellow card) 73'; Kittiwet (yellow card) 117'; Thanachach (yellow card) 120+6'	Stadium: Dragon Solar Park; Attendance: 3,833; Referee: Songkran Bunmeekiart
	Penalties
	Vander (penalty scored); Mahmoud Eid (penalty scored); Everton (penalty scored); Adisak Kraisorn (penalty scored)		(penalty missed) Elias; (penalty missed) Phanthamit Praphanth; (penalty scored) Pichitchai Sienkrahok

=== League Cup ===
6 December 2023 First Round	Mahasarakham SBT	0–3	True Bangkok United	Mueang, Mahasarakham
18.00 UTC+7		Report	Chayawat 23'; Suphan (yellow card) 40'; Chananan 55'; Chayathorn (yellow card) 60'; Soukouna 84'; Putthinan (yellow card) 86'	Stadium: Mahasarakham Provincial Stadium; Attendance: 2,567; Referee: Phairot Bunkamnoed

13 March 2024 Second Round	Ratchaburi	1–0	True Bangkok United	Mueang, Ratchaburi
18.00 UTC+7	Tyronne 61'; Mateus (yellow card) 87'; Ibrahim (yellow card) 90+1'	Report	Thossawat (yellow card) 58'; Weerathep (yellow card) 84'	Stadium: Dragon Solar Park; Attendance: 3,379; Referee: Wiwat Jumpaoon

=== Thailand Champions Cup ===
5 August 2023 Final	True Bangkok United	2–0	Buriram United	Bangkok
18.00 UTC+7	Willen 8'; Thitiphan (yellow card) 22'; Everton (yellow card) 33'; Mahmoud 50', (yellow card) 54'	Report		Stadium: Rajamangala Stadium; Attendance: 10,824; Referee: Torphong Somsing; Man of the Match: Nitipong Selanon

=== AFC Champions League ===
==== Group stage ====
Pos	Team	Pld	W	D	L	GF	GA	GD	Pts	Qualification	UTD	JBH	LCS	KIT
1	(Thailand) Bangkok United	6	4	1	1	11	8	+3	13	Advance to round of 16	—	3–2	1–0	1–1
2	(South Korea) Jeonbuk Hyundai Motors	6	4	0	2	12	9	+3	12	Advance to round of 16	3–2	—	3–0	2–1
3	(Singapore) Lion City Sailors	6	2	0	4	5	9	−4	6		1–2	2–0	—	0–2
4	(Hong Kong) Kitchee	6	1	1	4	7	9	−2	4		1–2	1–2	1–2	—

Source: AFC
Rules for classification: Tiebreakers

20 September 2023 1	Lion City Sailors (Singapore)	1–2	(Thailand) Bangkok United	Jalan Besar, Singapore
20.00 UTC+8	Lopes 25'; Pires (yellow card) 32'; Syahin (yellow card) 78'	Report	Mahmoud (yellow card) 25'; Everton 51'; Thitiphan 62'; Peerapat (yellow card) 70'; Pokklaw (yellow card) 84'	Stadium: Jalan Besar Stadium; Attendance: 2,927; Referee: Sadullo Gulmurodi (Tajikistan)

4 October 2023 2	Bangkok United (Thailand)	3–2	(South Korea) Jeonbuk Hyundai Motors	Pathum Thani, Thailand
19.00 UTC+7	Rungrath 26'; Ahn Hyeon-beom 58' (o.g.); Willen 82'; Peerapat (yellow card) 49'; Thitiphan (yellow card) 67'	Report	Thossawat 19' (o.g.); Moon Seon-Min 88'	Stadium: Thammasat Stadium; Attendance: 2,190; Referee: Adel Al Naqbi (United Arab Emirates)

25 October 2023 3	Kitchee (Hong Kong)	1–2	(Thailand) Bangkok United	Causeway Bay, Hong Kong
20.00 UTC+8	Jantscher 7'; Tan Chun Lok (yellow card) 45+1'; Law Tsz Chun (yellow card) 90+4'	Report	Thitiphan (yellow card) 20'; Suphan (yellow card) 67'; Rungrath 45+4'; Willen 52' (pen.); Jradi (red card) 84'; Mahmoud (yellow card) 90+4'; Chayawat (yellow card) 90+8'	Stadium: Hong Kong Stadium; Attendance: 2,259; Referee: Majed Mohammed Alshamrani (Saudi Arabia)

8 November 2023 4	Bangkok United (Thailand)	1–1	(Hong Kong) Kitchee	Pathum Thani, Thailand
19.00 UTC+7	Willen 27'; Everton (yellow card) 60'; Nitipong (yellow card) 90+4'		Jantscher 70'; Mikael (yellow card) 62'; Poon Pui Hin (red card) 72'; Russell (yellow card) 81'	Stadium: Thammasat Stadium; Attendance: 2,543; Referee: Ahmed Issa (United Arab Emirates)

29 November 2023 5	Bangkok United (Thailand)	1–0	(Singapore) Lion City Sailors	Pathum Thani, Thailand
21.00 UTC+7	Suphan (yellow card) 31'; Rungrath 86'	Report	Pedro (yellow card) 24'; Pires (yellow card) 90'; Lestienne (yellow card) 90+5'	Stadium: Thammasat Stadium; Attendance: 2,093; Referee: Casey Reibelt (Australia)

13 December 2023 6	Jeonbuk Hyundai Motors (South Korea)	3–2	(Thailand) Bangkok United	Jeonju, South Korea
19.00 UTC+9	Moon Seon-min 42'; Lee Dong-jun 76,78'	Report	Wanchai 4'; Rungrath 85'	Stadium: Jeonju World Cup Stadium; Attendance: 6,007; Referee: Khaled Al Teris (Saudi Arabia)

==== Knockout phase ====
===== Round of 16 =====
14 February 2024 First leg	Bangkok United (Thailand)	2–2	(Japan) Yokohama F. Marinos	Pathum Thani, Thailand
19.00 UTC+7	Nitipong 35'; Mahmoud 90+2'; Vander (yellow card) 90+7'	Report	Élber 18'; Watanabe 24'; Kida (yellow card) 45'; Eduardo (yellow card) 60'; Matsubara (red card) 90+6'	Stadium: Thammasat Stadium; Attendance: 8,387; Referee: Mohammed Khled Al Hoish (Saudi Arabia)

21 February 2024 Second leg	Yokohama F. Marinos (Japan)	1–0 (a.e.t.)	(Thailand) Bangkok United	Yokohama, Japan
20.00 UTC+9	Anderson Lopes 120+2' (pen.), (yellow card) 120+3'	Report	Patiwat (yellow card) 76'; Vander (yellow card) 90+3'; Everton (yellow card) 108'	Stadium: Yokohama International Stadium; Attendance: 8,343; Referee: Ilgiz Tanyashev (Uzbekistan)

== Statistics ==
=== Appearances and goals ===
No.	Pos	Nat	Player	Total		Thai League		FA Cup		League Cup		Champions Cup		AFC Champions League	
No.	Pos	Nat	Player	Apps	Goals	Apps	Goals	Apps	Goals	Apps	Goals	Apps	Goals	Apps	Goals
1	GK	(Thailand) THA	Patiwat Khammai	39	0	26	0	3	0	1	0	1	0	8	0
2	DF	(Thailand) THA	Peerapat Notchaiya	43	1	24+4	1	3+1	0	1+1	0	1	0	8	0
3	DF	(Brazil) BRA	Everton Gonçalves	45	7	29	4	4+1	2	1+1	0	1	0	8	1
4	DF	(Thailand) THA	Manuel Bihr	23	0	7+5	0	3	0	2	0	0	0	2+4	0
5	DF	(Thailand) THA	Putthinan Wannasri	9	0	1+4	0	2	0	0+2	0	0	0	0	0
6	DF	(Thailand) THA	Nitipong Selanon	43	3	26+2	2	2+3	0	1	0	1	0	8	1
7	MF	(Thailand) THA	Anon Amornlerdsak	6	0	0+3	0	1	0	0+1	0	0	0	0+1	0
8	MF	(Thailand) THA	Wisarut Imura	28	1	9+8	1	2+3	0	1	0	0+1	0	1+3	0
10	FW	(Lebanon) LBN	Bassel Jradi	24	5	13+4	4	2	1	0	0	0	0	1+4	0
11	MF	(Thailand) THA	Rungrath Poomchantuek	41	12	21+5	6	4+2	2	1	0	1	0	6+1	4
17	MF	(Thailand) THA	Tassanapong Muaddarak	23	1	1+12	1	2	0	1	0	0+1	0	1+5	0
18	MF	(Thailand) THA	Thitiphan Puangchan	10	1	6	0	0	0	0	0	1	0	3	1
19	FW	(Thailand) THA	Chayawat Srinawong	35	2	6+14	1	1+5	0	1+1	1	0	0	2+5	0
20	FW	(Thailand) THA	Guntapon Keereeleang	2	0	0+1	0	0+1	0	0	0	0	0	0	0
21	MF	(Thailand) THA	Chayathorn Tapsuvanavon	2	0	0+1	0	0	0	1	0	0	0	0	0
22	FW	(Thailand) THA	Adisak Kraisorn	14	1	2+9	1	1+1	0	0+1	0	0	0	0	0
24	DF	(Thailand) THA	Wanchai Jarunongkran	30	1	6+11	0	2+2	0	1	0	0+1	0	1+6	1
26	DF	(Thailand) THA	Suphan Thongsong	39	0	22+3	0	4+1	0	1	0	1	0	6++1	0
27	MF	(Thailand) THA	Weerathep Pomphan	21	0	11+3	0	4	0	1	0	0	0	2	0
28	MF	(Thailand) THA	Thossawat Limwannasathian	41	2	24+3	1	2+3	1	1	0	1	0	7	0
29	FW	(Brazil) BRA	Willen Mota	43	26	28+1	20	3+1	2	1	0	1	1	8	3
30	MF	(Thailand) THA	Ratchanat Arunyapairot	3	0	1+1	0	0+1	0	0	0	0	0	0	0
34	GK	(Thailand) THA	Warut Mekmusik	8	0	4	0	3	0	1	0	0	0	0	0
39	MF	(Thailand) THA	Pokklaw Anan	42	3	25+1	3	5+1	0	0+1	0	1	0	8	0
51	DF	(Thailand) THA	Kritsada Nontharat	10	0	2+5	0	2+1	0	0	0	0	0	0	0
52	GK	(Thailand) THA	Supanut Suadsong	1	0	0	0	0+1	0	0	0	0	0	0	0
90	MF	(Brazil) BRA	Vander	19	4	9+4	2	4	2	0	0	0	0	0+2	0
93	FW	(Palestine) PLE	Mahmoud Eid	35	11	21+3	9	0+1	0	1	0	1	1	7+1	1
94	FW	(France) FRA	Amadou Soukouna	12	3	2+3	0	3	2	1	1	0	0	1+2	0
96	DF	(Thailand) THA	Boontawee Theppawong	18	1	3+8	0	3+1	1	1	0	0+1	0	0+1	0
Players transferred/loaned out during the season
20	FW	(Thailand) THA	Chananan Pombuppha	8	1	0+5	0	0+1	0	1	1	0+1	0	0	0

Last updated: 5 August 2023
Source: Competitions

=== Top scorers ===
As of 15 June 2024

Rank	No.	Pos.	Nat.	Player	Thai League	FA Cup	League Cup	Champions Cup	Champions League	Total
1	29	FW	(Brazil)	Willen Mota	20	2	0	1	3	26
2	11	MF	(Thailand)	Rungrath Poomchantuek	6	2	0	0	4	12
3	93	FW	(Palestine)	Mahmoud Eid	9	0	0	1	1	11
4	3	DF	(Brazil)	Everton	5	2	0	0	1	8
5	10	MF	(Lebanon)	Bassel Jradi	4	1	0	0	0	5
6	90	MF	(Brazil)	Vander Luiz	2	2	0	0	0	4
7	94	FW	(France)	Amadou Soukouna	0	2	1	0	0	3
7	39	MF	(Thailand)	Pokklaw Anan	3	0	0	0	0	3
7	28	MF	(Thailand)	Thossawat Limwannasathian	2	1	0	0	0	3
7	6	RB	(Thailand)	Nitipong Selanon	2	0	0	0	1	3
8	36	FW	(Thailand)	Chayawat Srinawong	1	0	1	0	0	2
9	18	MF	(Thailand)	Thitiphan Puangchan	0	0	0	0	1	1
9	20	FW	(Thailand)	Chananan Pombuppha	0	0	1	0	0	1
9	24	LB	(Thailand)	Wanchai Jarunongkran	0	0	0	0	1	1
9	96	RB	(Thailand)	Boontawee Theppawong	0	1	0	0	0	1
9	22	FW	(Thailand)	Adisak Kraisorn	1	0	0	0	0	1
9	8	MF	(Thailand)	Wisarut Imura	1	0	0	0	0	1
9	2	LB	(Thailand)	Peerapat Notchaiya	1	0	0	0	0	1
9	17	MF	(Thailand)	Tassanapong Muaddarak	1	0	0	0	0	1
Own goals					-	1	-	-	1	2
Totals					58	14	3	2	13	90

=== Clean sheets ===
As of 15 June 2024

Rank	No.	Pos.	Nat.	Player	Thai League	FA Cup	League Cup	Champions Cup	Champions League	Total
1	1	GK	(Thailand)	Patiwat Khammai	13	2	0	1	1	17
2	34	GK	(Thailand)	Warut Mekmusik	1	2	1	0	0	4
Totals					14	4	1	1	1	21

=== Disciplinary record ===
As of match played 26 May 2024

No.	Pos.	Player	Thai League			FA Cup			League Cup			Champions Cup			AFC Champions League			Total		
No.	Pos.	Player	Booked	(yellow card) (yellow-red card)	Sent off (straight red)	Booked	(yellow card) (yellow-red card)	Sent off (straight red)	Booked	(yellow card) (yellow-red card)	Sent off (straight red)	Booked	(yellow card) (yellow-red card)	Sent off (straight red)	Booked	(yellow card) (yellow-red card)	Sent off (straight red)	Booked	(yellow card) (yellow-red card)	Sent off (straight red)
1	GK	(Thailand) Patiwat Khammai	1	0	0	0	0	0	0	0	0	0	0	0	1	0	0	2	0	0
2	DF	(Thailand) Peerapat Notchaiya	9	0	0	0	0	0	0	0	0	0	0	0	2	0	0	10	0	0
3	DF	(Brazil) Everton	5	0	0	0	0	0	0	0	0	1	0	0	2	0	0	8	0	0
4	DF	(Thailand) Manuel Bihr	3	0	0	0	0	0	0	0	0	0	0	0	0	0	0	3	0	0
5	DF	(Thailand) Putthinan Wannasri	1	0	0	0	0	0	1	0	0	0	0	0	0	0	0	2	0	0
6	DF	(Thailand) Nitipong Selanon	4	0	0	0	0	0	0	0	0	1	0	0	1	0	0	5	0	0
8	MF	(Thailand) Wisarut Imura	2	0	0	1	0	0	0	0	0	0	0	0	0	0	0	3	0	0
10	MF	(Lebanon) Bassel Jradi	3	0	0	1	0	0	0	0	0	0	0	0	0	0	1	4	0	1
11	MF	(Lebanon) Rungrath Poomchantuek	1	0	0	0	0	0	0	0	0	0	0	0	0	0	0	1	0	0
18	MF	(Thailand) Thitiphan Puangchan	2	0	0	0	0	0	0	0	0	1	0	0	1	0	0	4	0	0
19	FW	(Thailand) Chayawat Srinawong	2	0	0	1	0	0	0	0	0	0	0	0	0	0	0	3	0	0
21	MF	(Thailand) Chayathorn Tapsuvanavon	0	0	0	0	0	0	1	0	0	0	0	0	0	0	0	1	0	0
22	FW	(Thailand) Adisak Kraisorn	1	0	0	0	0	0	0	0	0	0	0	0	0	0	0	1	0	0
24	DF	(Thailand) Wanchai Jarunongkran	5	0	0	1	0	0	0	0	0	0	0	0	0	0	0	6	0	0
26	DF	(Thailand) Suphan Thongsong	4	0	0	0	0	0	1	0	0	0	0	0	1	0	0	6	0	0
27	MF	(Thailand) Weerathep Pomphan	4	0	0	0	0	0	1	0	0	0	0	0	0	0	0	5	0	0
28	MF	(Thailand) Thossawat Limwannasathian	5	1	0	1	0	0	1	0	0	0	0	0	0	0	0	7	1	0
29	FW	(Brazil) Willen	3	0	0	1	0	0	0	0	0	0	0	0	0	0	0	4	0	0
34	GK	(Thailand) Warut Mekmusik	0	0	0	2	0	0	0	0	0	0	0	0	0	0	0	2	0	0
39	MF	(Thailand) Pokklaw Anan	4	0	0	1	0	0	0	0	0	0	0	0	1	0	0	6	0	0
51	DF	(Thailand) Kritsada Nontharat	1	0	0	1	0	0	0	0	0	0	0	0	0	0	0	2	0	0
90	FW	(Brazil) Vander	4	0	0	1	0	0	0	0	0	0	0	0	2	0	0	7	0	0
93	FW	(Palestine) Mahmoud Eid	4	0	0	0	0	0	0	0	0	1	0	0	1	0	0	6	0	0
94	FW	(France) Amadou Soukouna	0	0	0	1	0	0	0	0	0	0	0	0	0	0	0	1	0	0
96	DF	(Thailand) Boontawee Theppawong	1	0	0	0	0	0	0	0	0	0	0	0	0	0	0	1	0	0
Total			69	1	0	12	0	0	5	0	0	3	0	0	12	0	1	98	1	1
