= 2024 Thai FA Cup final =

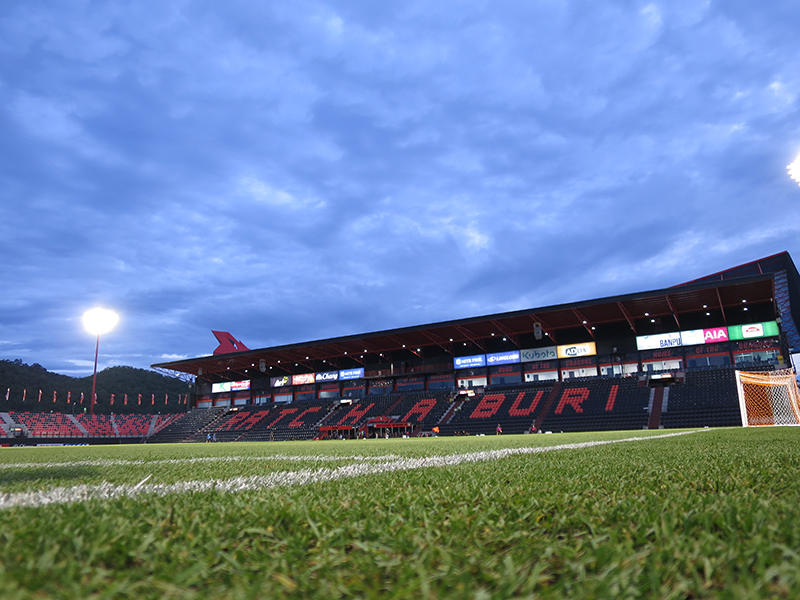
- The match took place at Dragon Solar Park.
- Event: 2023–24 Thai FA Cup
Bangkok United	Dragon Pathumwan Kanchanaburi
1	1
- After extra time Bangkok United won 4–1 on penalties
- Date: 15 June 2024
- Venue: Dragon Solar Park, Mueang, Ratchaburi
- Man of the Match: Weerathep Pomphan (Bangkok United)
- Referee: Songkran Bunmeekiart (Thailand)
- Attendance: 3,833
- Weather: Partly cloudy 32 °C (90 °F) humidity 63%

The 2024 Thai FA Cup final was the final match of the 2023–24 Thai FA Cup, the 30th season of a Thailand's football tournament organized by Football Association of Thailand. It was played at the Dragon Solar Park in Ratchaburi, Thailand on 15 June 2024, between Bangkok United a big team from Pathum Thani that is located in the Bangkok Metropolitan Region and Dragon Pathumwan Kanchanaburi a mighty team from Kanchanaburi that is located in the Western part of Thailand.

== Route to the final ==
Bangkok United (T1)			Round	Dragon Pathumwan Kanchanaburi (T2)		
Opponent	Result		Knockout 1 leg	Opponent	Result	
			Qualification	Namphong United (TA)	13–0 (H)	
Nakhon Si United (T2)	1–0 (A)	Highlight	Round of 64	Chattrakan City (TS)	3–2 (a.e.t.) (A)	
Samut Prakan City (T2)	4–0 (H)		Round of 32	Nongbua Pitchaya (T2)	2–1 (A)	
Songkhla (T3)	2–2 (a.e.t.) (5–4p) (A)	Highlight	Round of 16	Phitsanulok Unity (T3)	1–0 (a.e.t.) (A)	Highlight
Lamphun Warriors (T1)	1–0 (H)	Highlight	Quarter-finals	Sukhothai (T1)	2–0 (H)	Highlight
Udon United (T3)	5–0 (N)	Highlight	Semi-finals	Samut Sakhon City (T3)	3–1 (N)	Highlight

Note: In all results below, the score of the finalist is given first (H: home; A: away; T1: Clubs from Thai League 1; T2: Clubs from Thai League 2; T3: Clubs from Thai League 3; TS: Clubs from Thailand Semi-pro League; TA: Clubs from Thailand Amateur League.

== Match ==
=== Details ===
15 June 2024
18:00 UTC+7

Bangkok United	1–1 (a.e.t.)	Dragon Pathumwan Kanchanaburi
Vander 74' (pen.)	Report; Highlight	Ricardo Pires 65'
Penalties
Vander (penalty scored); Mahmoud Eid (penalty scored); Everton (penalty scored); Adisak Kraisorn (penalty scored)	4–1	(penalty missed) Elias; (penalty missed) Phanthamit Praphanth; (penalty scored) Pichitchai Sienkrathok

Dragon Solar Park,
Mueang, Ratchaburi
Attendance: 3,833
Referee: Songkran Bunmeekiart (Thailand)

Bangkok United	Dragon Pathumwan Kanchanaburi

Lineups:
GK	1	(Thailand) Patiwat Khammai
RB	6	(Thailand) Nitipong Selanon			(substituted off) 84'
CB	26	(Thailand) Suphan Thongsong
CB	3	(Brazil) Everton (c)
LB	2	(Thailand) Peerapat Notchaiya			(substituted off) 84'
DM	27	(Thailand) Weerathep Pomphan
CM	28	(Thailand) Thossawat Limwannasathian		(yellow card) 44'	(substituted off) 60'
CM	39	(Thailand) Pokklaw Anan		(yellow card) 45+2'	(substituted off) 77'
RF	11	(Thailand) Rungrath Poomchantuek			(substituted off) 77'
CF	94	(France) Amadou Soukouna			(substituted off) 99'
LF	90	(Brazil) Vander	74' (pen.)
Substitutes:
GK	34	(Thailand) Warut Mekmusik
DF	24	(Thailand) Wanchai Jarunongkran		(yellow card) 87'	(substituted on) 84'
DF	51	(Thailand) Kritsada Nontharat			(substituted on) 84'
MF	8	(Thailand) Wisarut Imura		(yellow card) 107'	(substituted on) 60'
MF	17	(Thailand) Tassanapong Muaddarak
MF	18	(Thailand) Thitiphan Puangchan
FW	19	(Thailand) Chayawat Srinawong			(substituted on) 77'
FW	22	(Thailand) Adisak Kraisorn			(substituted on) 99'
FW	93	(Palestine) Mahmoud Eid			(substituted on) 77'
Head Coach:
(Thailand) Totchtawan Sripan

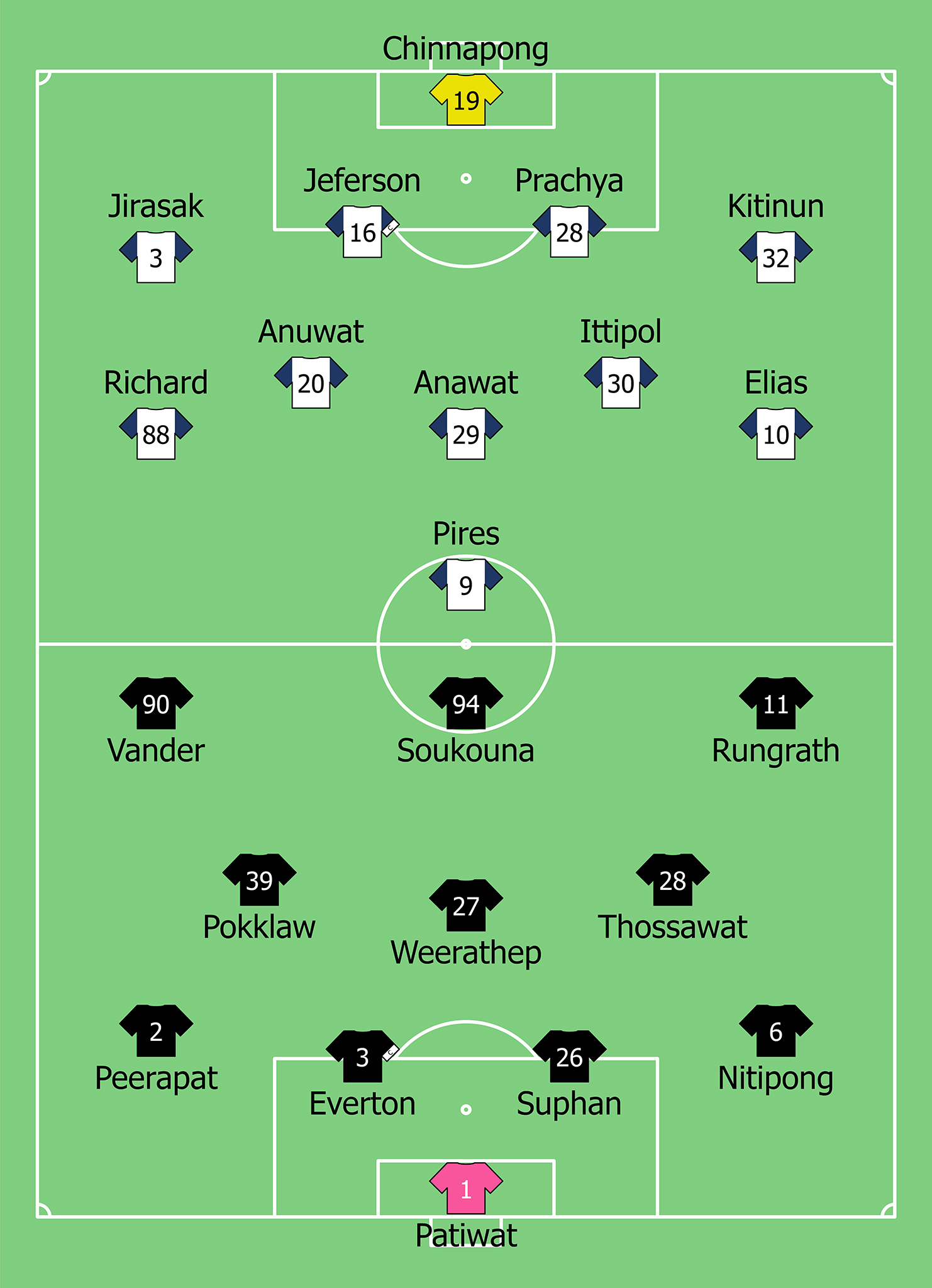

Lineups:
GK	19	(Thailand) Chinnapong Raksri		(yellow card) 73'
RB	3	(Thailand) Jirasak Kumthaisong		(yellow card) 46' (yellow-red card) 71'
CB	16	(Brazil) Jeferson de Sousa Ferreira (c)
CB	28	(Thailand) Prachya Fudsuparp			(substituted off) 110'
LB	32	(Thailand) Kitinun Suttiwiriyakul			(substituted off) 62'
CM	20	(Thailand) Anuwat Matarat			(substituted off) 110'
CM	30	(Thailand) Ittipol Akpatcha			(substituted off) 85'
RM	88	(Thailand) Richard Gertsch			(substituted off) 77'
AM	29	(Thailand) Anawat Koedsombat			(substituted off) 62'
LM	10	(Brazil) Elias
CF	9	(Brazil) Ricardo Pires	65'
Substitutes:
GK	38	(Thailand) Theerapat Sonjai
DF	14	(Thailand) Pacharakorn Nilploypetch
DF	15	(Thailand) Thanachach Phocha		(yellow card) 120+6'	(substituted on) 110'
DF	26	(Thailand) Pichitchai Sienkrathok			(substituted on) 77'
MF	8	(Thailand) Anusorn Phrmprasit			(substituted on) 85'
MF	23	(Thailand) Kittiwet Lochit		(yellow card) 117'	(substituted on) 110'
MF	71	(Thailand) Athatcha Rahongthong			(substituted on) 62'
FW	39	(Thailand) Misut Wisu Milan
FW	41	(Thailand) Phanthamit Praphanth			(substituted on) 62'
Head Coach:
(Thailand) Somchai Makmool

Assistant referees:
(Thailand) Tanate Chuchuen
(Thailand) Apichit Nophuan
Fourth official:
(Thailand) Warintron Sassadee
Assistant VAR:
(Thailand) Torphong Somsing
(Thailand) Rachain Srichai
Match Commissioner:
(Thailand) Boontham Pannooch
Referee Assessor:
(Thailand) Sura Sriart
General Coordinator:
(Thailand) Kittipon Thongrat

MATCH RULES

- 90 minutes.
- 30 minutes extra-time if necessary.
- Penalty shoot-out if still necessary.
- Maximum of 5 substitutions.

=== Statistics ===
First half
Statistic	Bangkok United	Dragon Pathumwan Kanchanaburi
Goals scored	0	0
Total shots	13	4
Shots on target	2	2
Saves	2	2
Ball possession	70%	30%
Total passes	250	121
Corner kicks	6	1
Offsides	1	1
Yellow cards	2	0
Red cards	0	0

Second half
Statistic	Bangkok United	Dragon Pathumwan Kanchanaburi
Goals scored	1	1
Total shots	6	1
Shots on target	3	1
Saves	0	2
Ball possession	78%	22%
Total passes	206	68
Corner kicks	10	0
Offsides	2	0
Yellow cards	1	3
Red cards	0	1

Extra time
Statistic	Bangkok United	Dragon Pathumwan Kanchanaburi
Goals scored	0	0
Total shots	8	3
Shots on target	2	1
Saves	1	2
Ball possession	72%	28%
Total passes	144	66
Corner kicks	3	2
Offsides	1	0
Yellow cards	1	2
Red cards	0	0

Overall
Statistic	Bangkok United	Dragon Pathumwan Kanchanaburi
Goals scored	1	1
Total shots	27	8
Shots on target	7	4
Saves	3	6
Ball possession	74%	26%
Total passes	600	255
Corner kicks	19	3
Offsides	4	1
Yellow cards	4	5
Red cards	0	1

== Winner ==
2023–24 Thai FA Cup
Winners
Bangkok United
First Title

=== Prizes for winner ===
- A champion trophy.
- 5,000,000 THB prize money.
- Qualification to 2024–25 AFC Champions League Elite Play-offs.
- Qualification to 2024 Thailand Champions Cup.

=== Prizes for runners-up ===
- 1,000,000 THB prize money.

== See also ==
- 2023–24 Thai League 1
- 2023–24 Thai League 2
- 2023–24 Thai League 3
- 2023–24 Thai FA Cup
- 2023–24 Thai League Cup
- 2023–24 Thai League 3 Cup
- 2023 Thailand Champions Cup
