= 2026–27 Bangkok United F.C. season =

Bangkok United F.C.
2026–27 season
- Chairman: (Thailand) Kajorn Chearavanont
- Manager: (Thailand) Totchtawan Sripan
- Stadium: True BG Stadium
Home colours	Away colours	Third colours

The 2026–27 season is Bangkok United Football Club's 18th in the new era since they took over from Bangkok University Football Club in 2009. It is the 9th season in the Thai League and the club's 16th (13th consecutive) season in the top flight of the Thai football league system since returning in the 2013 season.

From this season, it is confirmed that they will be sharing the ground with BG Pathum United after a strategic collaboration between BG Pathum United and True Bangkok United, enabling both clubs to utilize the venue for domestic league matches and international competitions.

== Squad ==
=== Thai League 1 Squad ===
As of 17 July 2025.

Squad No.	Name	Nationality	Date of birth (age)	Last club
Goalkeepers
1	Patiwat Khammai	(Thailand)	24 December 1994 (age 31)	(Thailand) Samut Prakan City
29	Phuwadol Pholsongkram	(Thailand)	11 May 2002 (age 24)	(Thailand) Ayutthaya United
38	Chinnapong Raksri	(Thailand)	14 April 1995 (age 31)	(Thailand) Kanchanaburi Power
88	Supanut Sudathip	(Thailand)	22 June 2006 (age 20)	(Thailand) Burapha United
Defenders
3	Everton Gonçalves (C)	(Brazil)	5 February 1990 (age 36)	(Thailand) Chiangrai United
5	Philipe Maia	(Brazil)	11 July 1995 (age 31)	(Saudi Arabia) Al-Adalah
6	John-Patrick Strauß	(Philippines) (Germany)	28 January 1996 (age 30)	(Thailand) Muangthong United
22	Wichan Inaram	(Thailand) (Nigeria)	20 July 2007 (age 19)	Youth Team
23	Lee Ki-je	(South Korea)	9 July 1991 (age 35)	(Iran) Mes Rafsanjan
24	Wanchai Jarunongkran	(Thailand)	18 December 1996 (age 29)	(Thailand) Police Tero
26	Suphan Thongsong	(Thailand)	26 August 1994 (age 32)	(Thailand) Suphanburi
27	James Beresford	(Thailand) (England)	17 April 2002 (age 24)	(Thailand) Uthai Thani
43	Surachai Booncharee	(Thailand)	26 April 2007 (age 19)	Youth Team
53	Nontapat Ploymee	(Thailand)	6 February 2006 (age 20)	Youth Team
71	Purich Subhensawang	(Thailand)	1 February 2007 (age 19)	Youth Team
Midfielders
4	Weerathep Pomphan	(Thailand)	19 September 1996 (age 30)	(Thailand) Muangthong United
7	Kakana Khamyok	(Thailand)	21 May 2004 (age 22)	(Thailand) Muangthong United
8	Thitiphan Puangchan	(Thailand)	1 September 1993 (age 33)	(Thailand) BG Pathum United
17	Wisarut Imura	(Thailand)	18 October 1997 (age 29)	(Thailand) Air Force United
21	Anthony Caceres	(Australia) (Uruguay)	29 September 1992 (age 34)	(Australia) Macarthur FC
37	Picha Autra	(Thailand)	7 January 1996 (age 30)	(Malaysia) Selangor
39	Pokklaw Anan	(Thailand)	4 March 1991 (age 35)	(Thailand) Chonburi
57	Chonlachart Tongjinda	(Thailand)	31 March 2005 (age 21)	Youth Team
58	Patchara Wangsawat	(Thailand)	4 September 2007 (age 19)	Youth Team
80	Ruski Kade	(Thailand)	4 November 2007 (age 19)	Youth Team
97	Felipe Santos	(Benin) (Brazil)	3 January 1997 (age 29)	(Azerbaijan) Araz-Naxçıvan
	Aekkarat Sansuwan	(Thailand)	8 June 2006 (age 20)	Youth Team
Strikers
10	Teerasil Dangda	(Thailand)	6 June 1988 (age 38)	(Thailand) BG Pathum United
11	Muhsen Al-Ghassani	(Oman)	27 March 1997 (age 29)	(Oman) Al-Seeb Club
18	Yonatan Cohen	(Israel) (Poland)	29 June 1996 (age 30)	(Israel) Hapoel Petah Tikva
19	Willian Popp	(Brazil)	13 April 1994 (age 32)	(Thailand) Muangthong United
20	Marc Cardona	(Spain)	8 July 1995 (age 31)	FC Andorra
44	Narakorn Kangkratok	(Thailand)	1 April 2003 (age 23)	(Thailand) Ayutthaya United
54	Achita Nawathit	(Thailand)	9 March 2007 (age 19)	Youth Team
55	Thanawat Deelert	(Thailand)	1 January 2007 (age 19)	Youth Team
72	Shunta Hasegawa	(Thailand) (Japan)	25 April 2005 (age 21)	Youth Team
90	Philip Bijawat Frey	(Thailand) (Germany)	25 November 2006 (age 19)	(Thailand) Bangkok
Players loaned out during season
7	Anon Amornlerdsak	(Thailand)	6 November 1997 (age 29)	(Thailand) Port
14	Guntapon Keereeleang	(Thailand)	22 January 2001 (age 25)	(Thailand) Rayong
35	Passakorn Biaothungoi (M)	(Thailand)	1 April 2000 (age 26)	(Thailand) Ayutthaya United
50	Bhumchanok Kamkla (D)	(Thailand)	16 March 2004 (age 22)	(Thailand) Ayutthaya United
51	Kritsada Nontharat	(Thailand)	16 February 2001 (age 25)	(Thailand) Trat
59	Chukid Wanpraphao (F)	(Thailand)	2 July 2001 (age 25)	(Thailand) Ayutthaya United
7	Rivaldinho	(Brazil) (Spain)	29 April 1995 (age 31)	(China) Qingdao Red Lions
44	Natcha Promsomboon	(Thailand)	8 February 2001 (age 25)	(Thailand) Ayutthaya United
56	Krit Kliangpan	(Thailand)	13 February 2006 (age 20)	Youth Team
99	Pichaiya Kongsri	(Thailand)	3 August 2007 (age 19)	Youth Team
Players left during season
70	Arthur Moura	(Brazil)	22 August 2000 (age 26)	(South Korea) Hwaseong FC

=== U21 Squad ===
As of 17 July 2025.

Squad No.	Name	Nationality	Date of birth (age)	Last club
Goalkeepers
Defenders
3	Siravich Chaiworamukkul	(Thailand)		Youth Team
5	Setthaphong Sathorn	(Thailand)		Youth Team
6	Kongpop Sodsong	(Thailand)		Youth Team
15	Warakoan Huatwiset	(Thailand)	28 October 2005 (age 21)	Youth Team
21	Thanakorn Duangpang	(Thailand)		Youth Team
22	Nontapat Ploymee	(Thailand)	6 February 2006 (age 20)	Youth Team
Midfielders
8	Sirayos Dansakul	(Thailand)		Youth Team
13	Patchara Wangsawat	(Thailand)	4 September 2007 (age 19)	Youth Team
14	Supakan Binsaha	(Thailand)		Youth Team
16	Pichaiya Kongsri	(Thailand)	3 August 2007 (age 19)	Youth Team
18	Aekkarat Sansuwan	(Thailand)	8 June 2006 (age 20)	Youth Team
20	Nutthakit Senanorit	(Thailand)		Youth Team
Strikers
9	Thanawat Deelert	(Thailand)	1 January 2007 (age 19)	Youth Team
11	Achita Nawathit	(Thailand)	9 March 2007 (age 19)	Youth Team
16	Philip Bijawat Frey	(Thailand) (Germany)	25 November 2006 (age 19)	(Thailand) Bangkok
	Thanadol Hemabuphakari	(Thailand)	16 July 2006 (age 20)	Youth Team
Players on loan
10	Nopparat Promiem	(Thailand)	1 August 2004 (age 22)	(Thailand) Bangkok
19	Mirako Inaram	(Thailand) (Nigeria)		Youth Team

== Coaching staff ==
Position	Staff
Sporting Director	(Australia) Danny Invincibile
Team Manager	(Thailand) Suradej Anandapong
Head coach	(Thailand) Totchtawan Sripan
Assistant coach	(Thailand) Panupong Wongsa
Assistant coach	(Thailand) Sarif Sainui
Assistant coach	(Australia) Danny Invincibile
Goalkeeping coach	(Thailand) Peerasit Mahothon (Italy) Gianluca Troilo
Assistant goalkeeper coach	(Thailand) Kittinan Chockcharoenlarp
Physical & Fitness coaches	(Thailand) Watcharachai Rajphaetyakhom
Physical & Fitness coaches	(Thailand) Tosaphon Doungjai
Head of Medicine	(Brazil) Janilson Quadros da silva
Physiotherapist	(Thailand) Mongkhon Saethao
Interpreter	(Thailand) Nuttapat Lertchanapisit
Team's Staff	(Thailand) Chatchai Phuengthong
Team's Staff	(Thailand) Ayuwat Duangin
Director of academy	(Australia) Danny Invincibile
Under-23s lead coach	(Thailand) Jirawat Lainananukul

== Transfer ==
=== In ===
Pre-Season

Date	Position	Player	Transferred to	Fee	Ref
First team
19 May 2026	DF	(Thailand) (England) James Beresford	(Thailand) Uthai Thani	Free	
23 May 2026	DF	(Philippines) John-Patrick Strauß	(Thailand) Muangthong United	Free	
31 May 2026	DF	(Thailand) Kritsada Nontharat	(Thailand) Rayong	End of loan	
31 May 2026	MF	(Thailand) Anon Amornlerdsak	(Thailand) Rayong	End of loan	
31 May 2026	FW	(Thailand) Chukid Wanpraphao	(Thailand) Pattani	End of loan	
1 June 2026	MF	(Thailand) Picha Autra	(Malaysia) Selangor (M1)	Undisclosed. 2 years contract	
3 July 2026	MF	(Benin) (Brazil) Felipe Santos	(Azerbaijan) Araz-Naxçıvan	Free	
4 July 2026	MF	(Israel) (Poland) Yonatan Cohen	(Israel) Hapoel Petah Tikva	Free	
10 July 2026	MF	(Australia) (Uruguay) Anthony Caceres	(Australia) Macarthur FC	Free	
11 July 2026	FW	(Brazil) Willian Popp	(Thailand) Muangthong United	Free	
20 August 2026	FW	(Spain) Marc Cardona	FC Andorra	Free	
4 September 2026	MF	(Thailand) Kakana Khamyok	(Thailand) Muangthong United	Undisclosed + (Brazil) Rivaldinho	
Academy
31 May 2026	GK	(Thailand) Supanut Sudathip	(Thailand) Burapha United	End of Loan	
31 May 2026	DF	(Thailand) Anaphat Nakngam	(Thailand) Customs United	End of Loan	
31 May 2026	DF	(Thailand) Bhumchanok Kamkla	(Thailand) Ayutthaya United	End of Loan	
31 May 2026	DF	(Thailand) Warakoan Huatwiset	(Thailand) Bangkok	End of Loan	
31 May 2026	MF	(Thailand) (Japan) Shunta Hasegawa	(Thailand) Customs United	End of Loan	
31 May 2026	MF	(Thailand) Passakorn Biaothungoi	(Thailand) Ayutthaya United	End of Loan	
31 May 2026	MF	(Thailand) Natcha Promsomboon	(Thailand) Ayutthaya United	End of Loan	
31 May 2026	FW	(Thailand) Chonlachart Tongjinda	(Thailand) Nakhon Si United	End of Loan	
31 May 2026	FW	(Thailand) Nopparat Promiem	(Thailand) Bangkok	End of Loan	
31 May 2026	FW	(Thailand) (Germany) Philip Bijawat Frey	(Thailand) Bangkok	End of Loan	

=== Out ===
Pre-Season

Date	Position	Player	Transferred to	Fee	Ref
First team
16 May 2026	DF	(Thailand) (Germany) Manuel Bihr	(Thailand) Port	Free	
19 May 2026	DF	(Thailand) Nitipong Selanon	(Thailand) Port	Free	
31 May 2026	MF	(Thailand) Picha Autra	(Malaysia) Selangor (M1)	End of loan	
1 June 2026	DF	(Thailand) Jakkapan Praisuwan	(Thailand) Buriram United	Free	
1 June 2026	DF	(Thailand) Boontawee Theppawong	(Thailand) Pattani	Free	
1 June 2026	MF	(Thailand) Rungrath Poomchantuek	(Thailand) Kanchanaburi Power	Free	
1 June 2026	MF	(Montenegro) Nebojša Kosović	(Saudi Arabia)	Free	
1 June 2026	FW	(Netherlands) (Morocco) (Indonesia) Ilias Alhaft	(Turkey) Vanspor	Free	
1 June 2026	FW	(Japan) Seia Kunori	(Singapore) Tampines Rovers	Free	
1 June 2026	FW	(Thailand) Chayawat Srinawong	(Thailand) Sukhothai	Free	
22 June 2026	DF	(Indonesia) Pratama Arhan	(Indonesia) Persija Jakarta	Free	
29 June 2026	MF	(Thailand) Anon Amornlerdsak	(Thailand) Rayong	Season loan	
30 June 2026	FW	(Netherlands) (Curaçao) Richairo Zivkovic	(Turkey) Vanspor	Free	
1 July 2026	MF	(Thailand) Passakorn Biaothungoi	(Thailand) Ayutthaya United	Season loan	
1 July 2026	FW	(Thailand) Chukid Wanpraphao	(Thailand) Ayutthaya United	Season loan	
19 August 2026	MF	(Thailand) Guntapon Keereeleang	(Thailand) Ayutthaya United	Season loan	
4 September 2026	DF	(Thailand) Bhumchanok Kamkla	(Thailand) Ayutthaya United	Season Loan	
4 September 2026	FW	(Brazil) Rivaldinho	(Thailand) Muangthong United	Season loan	
10 September 2026	MF	(Thailand) Natcha Promsomboon	(Thailand) Rayong	Season Loan	
16 September 2026	MF	(Thailand) Pichaiya Kongsri	(Thailand) Muangthong United	Season Loan	
18 September 2026	FW	(Brazil) Arthur Moura	(Indonesia) Borneo	Free	
Academy
24 July 2026	DF	(Thailand) Anapat Nakngam	(Thailand) Police Tero	Free	
30 July 2026	DF	(Thailand) Kittisak Dangsakul	(Thailand) Police Tero	Free	
1 September 2026	DF	(Thailand) (Nigeria) Mirako Inaram	(Thailand) Ayutthaya United	Season Loan	
1 September 2026	MF	(Thailand) Krit Kliangpan	(Thailand) Kanchanaburi Power	Season loan	
9 September 2026	FW	(Thailand) Nopparat Promiem	(Thailand) PTU	Season loan	

== Pre-season and friendlies ==
Win Draw Loss

1 August 2026 1	Chiangmai United (Thailand)	–	(Thailand) Bangkok United	Bangkok
				Stadium: Alpine Football Camp Training

6 August 2026 2	Lee Man (Hong Kong)	1–1	(Thailand) Bangkok United	Pathum Thani
				Stadium: True BG Stadium

22 August 2026 3	Pattani (Thailand)	0–5	(Thailand) Bangkok United	Khlong Si Pathum
				Stadium: Bangkok United Training Ground

29 August 2026 4	Chonburi (Thailand)	4–2	(Thailand) Bangkok United	Pathum Thani
	Dennis Murillo; Chaowat Weerachart; Peerapat Notchaiya		Teerasil Dangda; Willian Popp	Stadium: True BG Stadium

3 October 2026 5	Muangthong United (Thailand)	1–4	(Thailand) Bangkok United	Khlong Si Pathum
				Stadium: Bangkok United Training Ground

== Competitions ==
=== Thai League 1 ===
==== Matches ====
Win Draw Loss

5 September 2026 1	Bangkok United	3–1	Sisaket United	Pathum Thani
	Thitiphan Puangchan 15'; Weerathep Pomphan 22', 39'; Everton (yellow card) 57'; Muhsen Al-Ghassani (yellow card) 90+2'		Patrick Valverde 45' (pen.) (red card) 45+7'	Stadium: True BG Stadium; Attendance: 4,761; Referee: Veeraporn Maophaeo

11 September 2026 2	Ratchaburi	1–0	Bangkok United	Ratchaburi
	Bruno Mendes 13'; Roque Mesa (yellow card) 40'		Everton (yellow card) 50'	Stadium: Dragon Solar Park; Attendance: 3,719; Referee: Wiwat Jumpaoon

20 September 2026 3	Bangkok United	3–2	BG Pathum United	Pathum Thani
	Weerathep Pomphan 15' (yellow card) 38'; Everton 21' (yellow card) 23'; Willian Popp 90+8' (pen.); Pokklaw A-nan (yellow card) 26'; Suphan Thongsong (yellow card) 89'		Raniel 35'; Pasqual Verkamp 43'; Marko Nikolic (yellow card) 21'; Fabio Kaufmann (yellow card) 90+10'	Stadium: True BG Stadium; Attendance: 3,697; Referee: Torphong Somsing

11 October 2026 4	Lamphun Warriors	0–2	Bangkok United	Lamphun
	Putthinan Wannasri (yellow card) 17'; Baworn Tapla (yellow card) 69'		Willian Popp 48'; Kakana Khamyok 90+3'	Stadium: Lamphun Warriors Stadium; Attendance: 1,808; Referee: Woottipong Ketkam

18 October 2026 5	Bangkok United	0–2	Port	Pathum Thani
	Suphan Thongsong (yellow card) 45+3'		Worachit Kanitsribumphen 50'; Teerasak Poeiphimai 59'; Peerawat Akkratum (yellow card) 49'; Peeradol Chamrasamee (yellow card) 56'	Stadium: True BG Stadium; Attendance: 3,405; Referee: Mongkolchai Pechsri

25 October 2026 6	PT Prachuap	0–0	Bangkok United	Prachuap
			Kakana Khamyok (yellow card) 24'; Suphan Thongsong (yellow card) 43'	Stadium: Sam Ao Stadium; Attendance: 4,088; Referee: Narinnart Tiamskun

31 October 2026 7	Bangkok United	2–0	Uthai Thani	Pathum Thani
	Picha Autra 27'; Marc Cardona 64'; Willian Popp (penalty missed) 22; Patiwat Khammai (yellow card) 82'		Kelvin (yellow card) 82'	Stadium: True BG Stadium; Attendance: 2,067; Referee: Vitsavet Sangnakorn

8 November 2026 8	Rasisalai United	0–3	Bangkok United	Sisaket
	Ramon (yellow card) 90+4'		Kakana Khamyok 25'; Willian Popp 32', 64'	Stadium: Sri Nakhon Lamduan Stadium (Note: Sisaket Provincial Stadium is closed for renovation in preparation for the King's Cup.); Attendance: 1,965; Referee: Sila Jinnigorn

22 November 2026 9	Bangkok United	2–1	Ayutthaya United	Pathum Thani
	Muhsen Al-Ghassani 37'; Weerathep Pomphani 68' (yellow card) 56'; Philip Lee by (yellow card) 34'		Weerathep Pomphan 15' (yellow card) 38'; Hirotaka Mita (yellow card) 34' =	Stadium: True BG Stadium; Attendance: 2,21; Referee: Torphong Somsing

28 November 2026 10	Sukhothai	–	Bangkok United	Sukhothai
				Stadium: Thalay Luang Stadium

5 December 2026 11	Bangkok United	–	Pattani	Pathum Thani
				Stadium: True BG Stadium

13 December 2026 12	Bangkok United	–	Chonburi	Pathum Thani
				Stadium: True BG Stadium

19 December 2026 13	Rayong	–	Bangkok United	Rayong
				Stadium: Rayong Province Stadium

22 December 2026 14	Bangkok United	–	Chiangrai United	Pathum Thani
				Stadium: True BG Stadium

26 December 2026 15	Buriram United	–	Bangkok United	Buriram
				Stadium: Chang Arena

31 January 2027 16	Bangkok United	–	Ratchaburi	Pathum Thani
				Stadium: True BG Stadium

14 February 2027 17 (Rescheduled)	BG Pathum United	–	Bangkok United	Pathum Thani
				Stadium: True BG Stadium

20 February 2027 18	Bangkok United	–	Lamphun Warriors	Pathum Thani
				Stadium: True BG Stadium

28 February 2027 19	Port	–	Bangkok United	Bangkok
				Stadium: PAT Stadium

6 March 2027 20	Bangkok United	–	PT Prachuap	Pathum Thani
				Stadium: True BG Stadium

14 March 2027 21	Uthai Thani	–	Bangkok United	Uthai Thani
				Stadium: Uthai Thani Province Stadium

20 March 2027 22	Bangkok United	–	Rasisalai United	Pathum Thani
				Stadium: True BG Stadium

3 April 2027 23	Ayutthaya United	–	Bangkok United	Ayutthaya
				Stadium: Ayutthaya Province Stadium

18 April 2027 24	Bangkok United	–	Sukhothai	Pathum Thani
				Stadium: True BG Stadium

24 April 2027 25	Pattani	v	Bangkok United	Pattani
				Stadium: Pattani Province Stadium

1 May 2027 26	Chonburi	–	Bangkok United	Chonburi
				Stadium: Chonburi Stadium

9 May 2027 27	Bangkok United	–	Rayong	Pathum Thani
				Stadium: True BG Stadium

15 May 2027 28	Chiangrai United	–	Bangkok United	Chiangrai
				Stadium: Singha Chiangrai Stadium

23 May 2027 29	Bangkok United	–	Buriram United	Pathum Thani
				Stadium: True BG Stadium

30 May 2027 30	Sisaket United	–	Bangkok United	Sisaket
				Stadium: Sri Nakhon Lamduan Stadium

Pos	Team	Pld	W	D	L	GF	GA	GD	Pts	Qualification or relegation
1	Bangkok United	9	6	1	2	15	7	+8	19	Qualification to the 2027–28 AFC Champions League Elite League stage
2	PT Prachuap	8	6	1	1	11	4	+7	19	Qualification to the 2027–28 AFC Champions League Elite League stage
3	Port	7	5	1	1	15	8	+7	16	
4	Ayutthaya United	9	5	1	3	15	10	+5	16	
5	Buriram United	7	5	1	1	13	8	+5	16	

Updated to match(es) played on 22 November 2026. Source: Thai League 1 2026–27
Rules for classification: 1) Points; 2) Goal difference; 3) Goals scored.

=== Thai FA Cup ===
Win Draw Loss

21 October 2026 Rd of 64	Old Blood	0–8	Bangkok United	Pathum Thani
			Marc Cardona 18', 31'; Felipe Silva 20', 87'; Narakhorn Kangkratok 28'; Thitipoom Plianyuak 45+1' (o.g.); Kritsada Nontharat 80'; Phurich Subhensawang 90+3'	Stadium: True BG Stadium; Attendance: 337; Referee: Kanoksak Khiaodaeng

15-17 December 2026 Rd of 32	Phetchabun	–	Bangkok United	Phetchabun
				Stadium: Thailand National Sports University Phetchabun Campus Stadium

=== Thai League Cup ===
8-10 December 2026 Rd of 32	Thap Luang United	–	Bangkok United	Nakhon Pathom
				Stadium: Stadium of Kasetsart University

== Statistics ==
=== Appearances and goals ===
@ 22 Nov 26

No.	Pos.	Player	Thai League		FA Cup		League Cup		Total	
No.	Pos.	Player	Apps.	Goals	Apps.	Goals	Apps.	Goals	Apps.	Goals
1	GK	(Thailand) Patiwat Khammai	9	0	0	0	0	0	9	0
3	DF	(Brazil) Everton Gonçalves	9	1	0	0	0	0	9	1
4	MF	(Thailand) Weerathep Pomphan	9	4	0+1	0	0	0	10	4
5	DF	(Brazil) Philipe Maia	2+1	0	0	0	0	0	3	0
6	DF	(Philippines) John-Patrick Strauß	1+3	0	0	0	0	0	4	0
7	FW	(Thailand) Kakana Khamyok	4+4	2	0	0	0	0	8	2
8	MF	(Thailand) Thitiphan Puangchan	5+5	1	0+1	0	0	0	11	1
10	FW	(Thailand) Teerasil Dangda	5	0	0	0	0	0	5	0
11	MF	(Oman) Muhsen Al-Ghassani	0+4	1	0	0	0	0	4	1
17	MF	(Thailand) Wisarut Imura	0	0	1	0	0	0	1	0
18	MF	(Israel) (Poland) Yonatan Cohen	4	0	0	0	0	0	4	0
19	FW	(Brazil) Willian Popp	9	4	0	0	0	0	9	4
20	FW	(Spain) Marc Cardona	4+4	1	1	2	0	0	9	3
21	MF	(Australia) (Uruguay) Anthony Caceres	8	0	0	0	0	0	8	0
22	DF	(Thailand) (Nigeria) Wichan Inaram	0	0	1	0	0	0	1	0
23	DF	(South Korea) Lee Ki-je	5+1	0	0	0	0	0	6	0
24	DF	(Thailand) Wanchai Jarunongkran	2+3	0	0	0	0	0	5	0
26	DF	(Thailand) Suphan Thongsong	7+1	0	0	0	0	0	8	0
27	DF	(Thailand) (England) James Beresford	8	0	0	0	0	0	8	0
28	MF	(Thailand) Natcha Promsomboon	0	0	0	0	0	0	0	0
29	GK	(Thailand) Phuwadol Pholsongkram	0	0	1	0	0	0	1	0
32	MF	(Thailand) Narakhorn Kangkratok	0	0	0	0	0	0	0	0
35	DF	(Thailand) Kritsada Nontharat	2+2	0	1	1	0	0	5	1
37	MF	(Thailand) Picha Autra	4+4	1	1	0	0	0	9	1
38	GK	(Thailand) Chinnapong Raksri	0	0	0	0	0	0	0	0
39	MF	(Thailand) Pokklaw Anan	2+6	0	1	0	0	0	9	0
43	DF	(Thailand) Surachai Booncharee	0	0	1	0	0	0	1	0
44	DF	(Thailand) Narakhorn Kangkratok	0	0	1	1	0	0	1	1
51	DF	(Thailand) Phurich Subhensawang	0	0	0	0	0	0	0	0
57	MF	(Thailand) Chonlachart Tongjinda	0	0	1	0	0	0	1	0
71	DF	(Thailand) Phurich Subhensawang	0	0	0+1	1	0	0	1	1
72	FW	(Thailand) (Japan) Shunta Hasegawa	0	0	0+1	0	0	0	1	0
80	MF	(Thailand) Ruski Kade	0	0	0+1	0	0	0	1	0
97	FW	(Brazil) Felipe Santos	0+7	0	1	2	0	0	8	2
Players who have played this season but had left the club on loan to other club
7	MF	(Thailand) Anon Amornlerdsak	0	0	0	0	0	0	0	0
14	FW	(Thailand) Guntapon Keereeleang	0	0	0	0	0	0	0	0
59	FW	(Thailand) Chukid Wanpraphao	0	0	0	0	0	0	0	0
90	FW	(Thailand) (Germany) Philip Bijawat Frey	0	0	0	0	0	0	0	0
99	MF	(Thailand) Pichaya Kongsri	0	0	0	0	0	0	0	0
Players who have played this season but had left the club permanently
