= 2018 King's Cup squads =

International football competition squads

The 2018 King's Cup is an international football tournament that was held in Thailand from 23 to 25 March 2018. The 4 national teams involved in the tournament are required to register a squad of 23 players.

Players marked (c) were named as captain for their national squad. Number of caps counts until the start of the tournament, including all FIFA-recognized pre-tournament friendlies. Player's age is their age on the opening day of the tournament.

== Gabon ==
Coach: José Antonio Camacho

The following 27 players were called up for the 2018 King's Cup.
Last match updated was against Botswana on 15 November 2017.

No.	Pos.	Player	Date of birth (age)	Caps	Goals	Club
	GK	Didier Ovono	23 January 1983 (aged 35)	103	0	(French Football Federation) Paris FC
	GK	Yves Bitséki	23 April 1983 (aged 34)	25	1	(Gabonese Football Federation) CF Mounana
	GK	Donald Nzé	5 April 1992 (aged 25)	1	0	(Gabonese Football Federation) AS Pélican
	DF	Bruno Ecuele Manga	16 July 1988 (aged 29)	71	8	(Football Association of Wales) Cardiff City
	DF	Lloyd Palun	28 November 1988 (aged 29)	42	0	(Royal Belgian Football Association) Cercle Brugge
	DF	Aaron Appindangoyé	2 February 1992 (aged 26)	33	1	(Turkish Football Federation) Ümraniyespor
	DF	Johann Obiang	5 June 1993 (aged 24)	24	0	(French Football Federation) Troyes
	DF	Henri Ndong	23 August 1992 (aged 25)	12	0	(Georgian Football Federation) Samtredia
	DF	Randal Oto'o	23 May 1994 (aged 23)	12	0	(Royal Belgian Football Association) KVC Westerlo
	DF	Franck Obambou	26 June 1987 (aged 30)	8	1	(Algerian Football Federation) Sétif
	DF	Junior Assoumou	22 July 1995 (aged 22)	5	0	(French Football Federation) Pau
	DF	Stevy Nzambe	4 September 1991 (aged 26)	4	0	(South African Football Association) Real Kings
	MF	Lévy Madinda	11 June 1992 (aged 25)	46	5	(Hellenic Football Federation) Asteras Tripolis
	MF	André Poko	1 January 1993 (aged 25)	41	1	(Turkish Football Federation) Göztepe
	MF	Guélor Kanga	1 August 1990 (aged 27)	33	2	(Football Association of the Czech Republic) Sparta Prague
	MF	Samson Mbingui	9 February 1992 (aged 26)	31	3	(French Football Federation) Tours
	MF	Merlin Tandjigora	6 April 1990 (aged 27)	26	1	(Portuguese Football Federation) Belenenses
	MF	Didier Ndong	17 May 1994 (aged 23)	25	0	(The Football Association) Watford
	MF	Mario Lemina	1 August 1993 (aged 24)	11	2	(The Football Association) Southampton
	MF	Denis Bouanga	11 November 1994 (aged 23)	8	2	(French Football Federation) Tours
	MF	Ulysse Ndong	24 November 1992 (aged 25)	5	0	(Bulgarian Football Union) Vereya
	MF	Louis Autchanga	3 October 1996 (aged 21)	5	0	(Gabonese Football Federation) CF Mounana
	MF	Serge-Junior Martinsson Ngouali	23 January 1992 (aged 26)	3	0	(Swedish Football Association) Hammarby
	FW	Malick Evouna	28 November 1992 (aged 25)	30	12	(Chinese Football Association) Tianjin TEDA
	FW	Aaron Boupendza	7 August 1996 (aged 21)	8	1	(French Football Federation) Pau
	FW	Axel Méyé	6 June 1995 (aged 22)	7	0	(French Football Federation) Paris FC

== Slovakia ==
Coach: Ján Kozák

No.	Pos.	Player	Date of birth (age)	Caps	Goals	Club
1	GK	Martin Dúbravka	15 January 1989 (age 37)	9	0	(The Football Association) Newcastle United
12	GK	Martin Polaček	2 April 1990 (age 36)	1	0	(Football Association of the Czech Republic) Mladá Boleslav
2	DF	Peter Pekarík	30 October 1986 (age 39)	80	2	(German Football Association) Hertha BSC
3	DF	Martin Škrtel (Captain)	15 December 1984 (age 41)	95	6	(Turkish Football Federation) Fenerbahçe
4	DF	Boris Sekulić	21 November 1991 (age 34)	0	0	(Slovak Football Association) Slovan Bratislava
5	DF	Norbert Gyömbér	3 July 1992 (age 33)	20	0	(Italian Football Federation) Bari
14	DF	Milan Škriniar	11 February 1995 (age 31)	14	0	(Italian Football Federation) Internazionale
15	DF	Tomáš Hubočan	17 September 1985 (age 40)	58	0	(Turkish Football Federation) Trabzonspor
6	MF	Ján Greguš	29 January 1991 (age 35)	15	1	(Danish Football Association) Copenhagen
7	MF	Filip Kiss	13 October 1990 (age 35)	12	0	(Saudi Arabian Football Federation) Al-Ettifaq
8	MF	Ondrej Duda	5 December 1994 (age 31)	20	3	(German Football Association) Hertha BSC
9	MF	Jaroslav Mihalík	2 July 1994 (age 31)	2	0	(Slovak Football Association) Žilina
10	MF	Albert Rusnák	7 July 1994 (age 31)	8	0	(United States Soccer Federation) Real Salt Lake
13	MF	Patrik Hrošovský	22 April 1992 (age 34)	18	0	(Football Association of the Czech Republic) Viktoria Plzeň
20	MF	Róbert Mak	8 March 1991 (age 35)	41	9	(Hellenic Football Federation) PAOK
22	MF	Stanislav Lobotka	25 November 1994 (age 31)	7	2	(Royal Spanish Football Federation) Celta Vigo
11	FW	Adam Nemec	2 September 1985 (age 40)	34	11	(Romanian Football Federation) Dinamo București
21	FW	Michal Ďuriš	1 June 1988 (age 37)	36	4	(Cyprus Football Association) Anorthosis Famagusta

== Thailand ==
Coach: Milovan Rajevac

The following 23 players were called up for the 2018 King's Cup on 8 March 2018.
Last match updated was against Kenya on 8 October 2017.

No.	Pos.	Player	Date of birth (age)	Caps	Goals	Club
1	GK	Kawin Thamsatchanan (Captain)	26 January 1990 (aged 28)	62	0	(Royal Belgian Football Association) OH Leuven
23	GK	Siwarak Tedsungnoen	20 April 1984 (aged 33)	10	0	(Football Association of Thailand) Buriram United
20	GK	Chatchai Budprom	4 February 1987 (aged 31)	2	0	(Football Association of Thailand) Chiangrai United
3	DF	Theerathon Bunmathan	6 February 1990 (aged 28)	49	5	(Japan Football Association) Vissel Kobe
2	DF	Peerapat Notchaiya	4 February 1993 (aged 25)	25	1	(Football Association of Thailand) Muangthong United
5	DF	Adisorn Promrak	21 October 1993 (aged 24)	24	0	(Football Association of Thailand) Muangthong United
13	DF	Narubadin Weerawatnodom	12 July 1994 (aged 23)	24	0	(Football Association of Thailand) Buriram United
6	DF	Pansa Hemviboon	8 July 1990 (aged 27)	7	0	(Football Association of Thailand) Buriram United
4	DF	Chalermpong Kerdkaew	7 November 1986 (aged 31)	5	0	(Football Association of Thailand) Nakhon Ratchasima
24	DF	Nitipong Selanon	23 May 1993 (aged 24)	0	0	(Football Association of Thailand) Port
19	DF	Kevin Deeromram	11 November 1997 (aged 20)	1	0	(Football Association of Thailand) Port
16	DF	Shinnaphat Leeaoh	2 February 1997 (aged 21)	0	0	(Football Association of Thailand) Chiangrai United
18	MF	Chanathip Songkrasin	5 October 1993 (aged 24)	42	5	(Japan Football Association) Consadole Sapporo
11	MF	Mongkol Tossakrai	9 May 1987 (aged 30)	34	10	(Football Association of Thailand) Chiangrai United
21	MF	Pokklaw Anan	4 March 1991 (aged 27)	33	5	(Football Association of Thailand) Bangkok United
7	MF	Jakkaphan Kaewprom	24 May 1988 (aged 29)	18	1	(Football Association of Thailand) Buriram United
8	MF	Thitipan Puangchan	1 September 1993 (aged 24)	13	4	(Football Association of Thailand) Bangkok Glass
14	MF	Nurul Sriyankem	8 February 1992 (aged 26)	7	0	(Football Association of Thailand) Port
15	MF	Bodin Phala	20 December 1994 (aged 23)	4	0	(Football Association of Thailand) Port
17	MF	Supachok Sarachat	22 May 1998 (aged 19)	1	0	(Football Association of Thailand) Buriram United
10	FW	Teerasil Dangda	6 June 1988 (aged 29)	91	42	(Japan Football Association) Sanfrecce Hiroshima
22	FW	Siroch Chatthong	8 December 1992 (aged 25)	21	3	(Football Association of Thailand) Muangthong United
9	FW	Supot Jodjam	2 March 1990 (aged 28)	1	0	(Football Association of Thailand) Krabi

== United Arab Emirates ==
Coach: Alberto Zaccheroni

No.	Pos.	Player	Date of birth (age)	Caps	Goals	Club
	GK	Majed Naser	1 April 1984 (aged 33)	73	0	(United Arab Emirates Football Association) Shabab Al-Ahli Dubai
	GK	Khalid Eisa	15 September 1989 (aged 28)	16	0	(United Arab Emirates Football Association) Al–Ain
	DF	Mohamed Ahmed	16 April 1989 (aged 28)	15	2	(United Arab Emirates Football Association) Al–Ain
	DF	Hamdan Al-Kamali	2 May 1989 (aged 28)	52	5	(United Arab Emirates Football Association) Al–Wahda
	DF	Abdelaziz Sanqour	7 May 1989 (aged 28)	0	1	(United Arab Emirates Football Association) Shabab Al-Ahli Dubai
	DF	Khalifa Mubarak	30 October 1993 (aged 24)	0	0	(United Arab Emirates Football Association) Al–Nasr
	DF	Mohanad Salem	1 March 1985 (aged 33)	0	1	(United Arab Emirates Football Association) Al–Ain
	DF	Mahmoud Khamees	28 October 1987 (aged 30)	0	1	(United Arab Emirates Football Association) Al–Nasr
	MF	Ismail Al Hammadi	1 July 1988 (aged 29)	97	14	(United Arab Emirates Football Association) Shabab Al-Ahli Dubai
	MF	Omar Abdulrahman	20 September 1991 (aged 26)	57	9	(United Arab Emirates Football Association) Al–Ain
	MF	Habib Fardan	11 November 1990 (aged 27)	12	6	(United Arab Emirates Football Association) Shabab Al-Ahli Dubai
	MF	Khamis Esmaeel	16 August 1989 (aged 28)	12	0	(United Arab Emirates Football Association) Shabab Al-Ahli Dubai
	MF	Hassan Ibrahim	19 October 1990 (aged 27)	4	0	(United Arab Emirates Football Association) Shabab Al-Ahli Dubai
	MF	Ahmed Barman	5 February 1994 (aged 24)	4	0	(United Arab Emirates Football Association) Al–Ain
	MF	Tareq Ahmed	12 March 1988 (aged 30)	1	1	(United Arab Emirates Football Association) Al–Nasr
	MF	Khaled Bashir	6 January 1995 (aged 23)	0	0	(United Arab Emirates Football Association) Al–Wasl
	FW	Ismail Matar	7 April 1983 (aged 34)	117	36	(United Arab Emirates Football Association) Al–Wahda
	FW	Ahmed Khalil	8 June 1991 (aged 26)	79	48	(United Arab Emirates Football Association) Al–Ain
	FW	Ali Mabkhout	5 October 1990 (aged 27)	46	42	(United Arab Emirates Football Association) Al–Jazira
	FW	Mohammed Fawzi	23 October 1990 (aged 27)	13	2	(United Arab Emirates Football Association) Al–Ain
	FW	Salem Saleh	14 January 1991 (aged 27)	12	5	(United Arab Emirates Football Association) Al–Nasr
