= Manuel Bihr =

Thai footballer (born 1993)

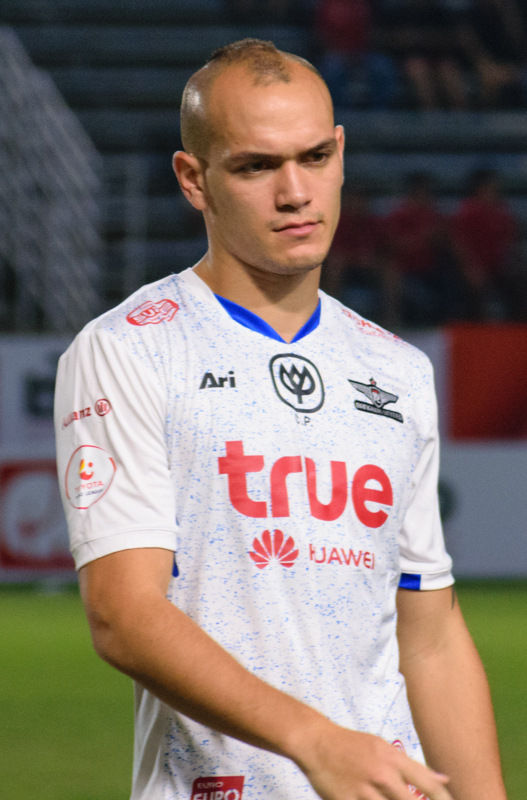
- Bihr playing for Bangkok United in 2018

Personal information
- Full name: Manuel Tom Bihr
- Date of birth: 17 September 1993 (age 33)
- Place of birth: Herrenberg, Germany
- Height: 1.84 m (6 ft 0 in)
- Position: Centre-back

Team information
- Current team: Port
- Number: 15

Youth career
- 2008–2012: VfB Stuttgart

Senior career*
Years	Team	Apps	(Gls)
2012–2015	1. FC Nürnberg II	58	(1)
2014–2015	1. FC Nürnberg	8	(0)
2015–2016	Stuttgarter Kickers	30	(0)
2016–2026	Bangkok United	176	(7)
2026–	Port	1	(0)

International career^{‡}
2017–	Thailand	31	(1)
Medal record
Men's football
Representing Thailand
FIFA ASEAN Cup
Runner-up	2026 Indonesia	Team
ASEAN Championship
Winner	Suzuki Cup 2020	Team
Runner-up	Hyundai Cup 2026	Team
- * Club domestic league appearances and goals as of 20 September 2026 ‡ National team caps and goals as of 26 August 2026

Manuel Tom Bihr (Thai: มานูเอล ทอม เบียรห์, born 17 September 1993) is a professional footballer who plays as a centre-back for Thai League 1 club Port. Born in Germany, he plays for the Thailand national team.

== Club career ==
On 29 September 2014, Bihr made his professional career debut in the 2. Bundesliga for Nurnberg in a match against Kaiserslautern. He played for 64 minutes before being substituted off for Cristian Ramírez.

In July 2015, Bihr signed for 3. Liga club Stuttgarter Kickers. He make his debut for the club on 23 August 2015 in a draw against VfR Aalen.

On 4 July 2016, Bihr moved to the Thai League 1 club Bangkok United. He make his debut for the club on 17 July in a 4–2 win over BBCU.

On 5 July 2017, he scored his first professional career goal in a 5–4 win over Bangkok Glass.

On 24 October 2020, Bihr scored a goal in a 1–1 draw to Nakhon Ratchasima.

On 20 September 2023, Bihr make his AFC Champions League debut in a 2–1 away win to Singaporean club Lion City Sailors. Bihr then helped the club to win the 2024 Thai FA Cup final.

Bihr becomes a solid defensive player for the club. Bangkok United made a 3-year consecutively runners-up in the Thai League 1.

== International career ==
In March 2017, Bihr was called up to the Thailand national team for the first time under the leadership of coach Kiatisuk. This was when the Thai team was preparing for the match against Saudi Arabia in the 2018 World Cup qualifiers. However Bihr was dropped due to a sudden injury.

In August 2017, Bihr was again included in the squad to prepare for matches against Iraq and Australia, also in the 2018 FIFA World Cup qualification. However, he was not fielded by coach Milovan Rajevac.

In October 2017, Bihr was called up to play in a friendly match against Kenya and made his debut for Thailand in the starting lineup. In March 2018, Bihr was called up to prepare for the 2018 King's Cup, but not listed in the final squad. In 2021, he was called up by Thailand national team for the 2020 AFF Championship where he would go on to win the cup.

On 31 March 2026, he scored his first international goal in a 2–1 victory over Turkmenistan, securing his nation's top spot in their qualification group and a place at the 2027 AFC Asian Cup.

== Personal life ==
Bihr was born in Herrenberg to a German father and a Thai mother from Chiang Mai.

== Career statistics ==
=== Club ===
As of 7 April 2024

Club	Season	League		Cup		League Cup		Continental		Others		Total	
Club	Season	Apps	Goals	Apps	Goals	Apps	Goals	Apps	Goals	Apps	Goals	Apps	Goals
1. FC Nürnberg II	2012–13	28	1	—		—		—		—		28	1
1. FC Nürnberg II	2013–14	21	0	—		—		—		—		21	0
1. FC Nürnberg II	2014–15	9	0	—		—		—		—		9	0
Total		58	1	—		—		—		—		58	1
1. FC Nürnberg	2013–14	0	0	0	0	—		—		—		0	0
1. FC Nürnberg	2014–15	8	0	0	0	—		—		—		8	0
Total		8	0	0	0	—		—		—		8	0
Stuttgarter Kickers	2015–16	23	0	3	0	—		—		—		26	0
Total		23	0	3	0	—		—		—		26	0
Bangkok United	2016	4	0	—		—		—		—		4	0
Bangkok United	2017	19	2	4	0	1	0	1	0	—		25	2
Bangkok United	2018	28	1	1	0	0	0	—		—		29	1
Bangkok United	2019	26	0	4	0	1	0	1	0	—		32	0
Bangkok United	2020–21	27	3	2	0	0	0	—		—		29	3
Bangkok United	2021–22	16	0	2	0	2	0	—		—		20	0
Bangkok United	2022–23	20	1	4	1	2	0	—		—		26	2
Bangkok United	2023–24	12	0	3	0	2	0	6	0	—		23	0
Bangkok United	2024–25	18	0	2	0	3	1	6	0	—		29	1
Bangkok United	2025–26	6	0	2	0	1	0	6	0	1	0	16	0
Total		176	7	24	1	12	1	18	0	1	0	233	9
Career total		241	8	15	0	3	0	18	0	1	0	261	9

=== International ===
As of 31 March 2026

National team	Year	Apps	Goals
Thailand	2017	1	0
Thailand	2018	3	0
Thailand	2019	6	0
Thailand	2021	7	0
Thailand	2022	3	0
Thailand	2023	1	0
Thailand	2026	1	1
Total		22	1

=== International goals ===
#	Date	Venue	Opponent	Score	Result	Competition
1.	31 March 2026	Rajamangala Stadium, Bangkok, Thailand	Turkmenistan	2–1	2–1	2027 AFC Asian Cup qualification

== Honours ==
=== Club ===
Bangkok United

- Thailand Champions Cup: 2023
- Thai FA Cup: 2023–24

=== International ===
Thailand

- AFF Championship: 2020
