= Ratchanat Arunyapairot =

Thai footballer (born 1996)

Personal information
- Full name: Ratchanat Arunyapairot
- Date of birth: 22 June 1996 (age 30)
- Place of birth: Suphan Buri, Thailand
- Height: 1.80 m (5 ft 11 in)
- Positions: Attacking midfielder; winger

Team information
- Current team: Sukhothai
- Number: 8

Youth career
- 2012–2014: Ratchaburi Mitr Phol

Senior career*
Years	Team	Apps	(Gls)
2014–2017	Ratchaburi Mitr Phol	2	(0)
2015	→ RBAC (loan)	2	(0)
2016	→ Singburi Bangrajun (loan)	24	(8)
2017	→ Chainat Hornbill (loan)	12	(1)
2018–2019	Chainat Hornbill	24	(2)
2020–2022	Suphanburi	39	(6)
2022–2024	Bangkok United	16	(1)
2024–	Sukhothai	0	(0)

International career
2018	Thailand U23	5	(1)
- * Club domestic league appearances and goals

Ratchanat Arunyapairot (Thai: รัชนาท อรัญญไพโรจน์, born June 22, 1996) is a Thai professional footballer who plays as an attacking midfielder or a winger for Thai League 1 club Sukhothai.

== Honours ==
=== Club ===
Chainat Hornbill

- Thai League 2: 2017

Bangkok United

- Thailand Champions Cup: 2023
- Thai FA Cup: 2023–24
