= Warut Mekmusik =

Thai footballer

Personal information
- Full name: Warut Mekmusik
- Date of birth: 21 February 1992 (age 34)
- Place of birth: Phatthalung, Thailand
- Height: 1.80 m (5 ft 11 in)
- Position: Goalkeeper

Team information
- Current team: Ayutthaya United
- Number: 1

Youth career
- 2009: Buriram United

Senior career*
Years	Team	Apps	(Gls)
2010–2011	Buriram	0	(0)
2011–2012	Phattalung	28	(0)
2012–2013	Air Force United	19	(0)
2014–2025	Bangkok United	95	(0)
2025–	Ayutthaya United	19	(0)
- * Club domestic league appearances and goals as of 15 November 2025

Warut Mekmusik (Thai: วรุฒ เมฆมุสิก, born February 21, 1992), or simply known as Jay (Thai: เจ), is a Thai professional footballer who plays as a goalkeeper for Thai League T1 club Ayutthaya United.

== Honours ==
=== Clubs ===
Air Force United

- Thai Division 1 League: 2013

Bangkok United

- Thailand Champions Cup: 2023
- Thai FA Cup: 2023–24
