= Peerapat Notchaiya =

Thai footballer (born 1993)

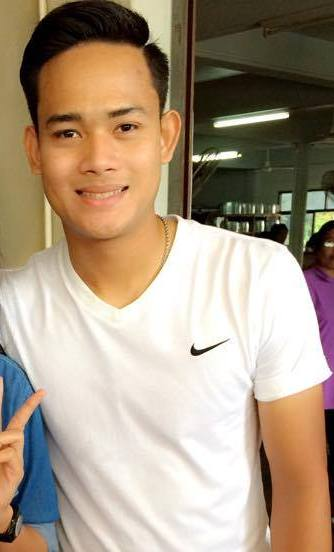
- Peerapat in 2014

Personal information
- Full name: Peerapat Notchaiya
- Date of birth: 4 February 1993 (age 33)
- Place of birth: Ayutthaya, Thailand
- Height: 1.75 m (5 ft 9 in)
- Position: Left back

Team information
- Current team: Kanchanaburi Power
- Number: 2

Youth career
- 2010: Suphanburi Sports School
- 2011: Police United

Senior career*
Years	Team	Apps	(Gls)
2011	Bangkok	24	(2)
2012–2016	BEC Tero Sasana	96	(5)
2016	→ Muangthong United (loan)	18	(1)
2016–2018	Muangthong United	68	(3)
2019–2025	Bangkok United	147	(5)
2025–2026	Kanchanaburi Power	21	(0)

International career^{‡}
2011–2012	Thailand U19	10	(1)
2012–2016	Thailand U23	16	(0)
2013–2023	Thailand	36	(1)
Medal record
Thailand under-19
AFF U-19 Youth Championship
Winner	AFF U-19 Youth Championship 2011	Football
Thailand under-23
Sea Games
Gold medal – first place	Sea Games 2013	Football
Gold medal – first place	Sea Games 2015	Football
Thailand
Asean Football Championship
Winner	AFF Suzuki Cup 2014	2014
Winner	AFF Suzuki Cup 2016	2016
- * Club domestic league appearances and goals as of 20:20, 27 October 2024 (UTC) ‡ National team caps and goals as of 21 March 2019

Peerapat Notchaiya (Thai: พีระพัฒน์ โน๊ตชัยยา, RTGS: Phiraphat Notchaiya, pronounced [pʰīː.rā.pʰát nóːt.t͡ɕʰāj.jāː]; born 4 February 1993) is a Thai professional footballer who plays as a left back for Thai League 1 club Kanchanaburi Power and the Thailand national team.

== Club career ==
=== Muangthong United ===
On 27 January 2016, it was announced that Peerapat along with his BEC Tero teammates Tanaboon Kesarat and Chanathip Songkrasin would be joining Muangthong United on loan for the 2016 season.

=== Bangkok United ===
On 28 November 2018, Peerapat joined Thai League 1 side, Bangkok United. He won the 2023 Thailand Champions Cup with the club. On 25 August 2023, Peerapat make his 100 league appearances with the club against Lamphun Warriors. On 20 September 2023, he make his AFC Champions League debut in a 1-2 away win against Lion City Sailors.

== International career ==
Peerapat Notchaiya played for Thailand U19, and played in the 2012 AFC U-19 Championship qualification. Peerapat played for Thailand's first team against China, in a friendly match which Thailand won 5-1. He represented Thailand U23 in the 2013 Southeast Asian Games. He also played for Thailand U23 in the 2014 Asian Games. Peerapat is part of Thailand's squad in the 2014 AFF Suzuki Cup. In May 2015, he was called up by Thailand to play in the 2018 FIFA World Cup qualification (AFC) against Vietnam. He won the 2015 Southeast Asian Games with Thailand U23.

== Style of play ==
Peerapat is known for his powerful long-range shots.

== Career statistics ==
=== Club ===
As of match played 26 May 2024

Appearances and goals by club, season and competition
Club	Season	League			FA Cup		League Cup		Continental		Others		Total	
Club	Season	Division	Apps	Goals	Apps	Goals	Apps	Goals	Apps	Goals	Apps	Goals	Apps	Goals
BEC Tero Sasana	2012	Thai Premier League	15	0	0	0	0	0	—		—		15	0
BEC Tero Sasana	2013	Thai Premier League	16	0	0	0	0	0	—		—		16	0
BEC Tero Sasana	2014	Thai Premier League	34	2	0	0	0	0	—		—		34	2
BEC Tero Sasana	2015	Thai Premier League	31	3	0	0	0	0	—		—		31	3
BEC Tero Sasana	Total		96	5	0	0	0	0	—		—		96	5
Muangthong United (loan)	2016	Thai League 1	18	1	0	0	0	0	2	0	1	0	21	0
Muangthong United	2016	Thai League 1	10	0	1	0	0	0	—		—		11	0
Muangthong United	2017	Thai League 1	27	3	4	0	4	1	8	0	1	0	44	4
Muangthong United	2018	Thai League 1	31	0	2	0	1	0	1	0	–		35	0
Muangthong United	Total		68	3	7	0	5	1	9	0	1	0	90	5
Bangkok United	2019	Thai League 1	22	1	2	0	1	0	1	0	—		26	1
Bangkok United	2020–21	Thai League 1	23	0	4	1	—		—		—		27	1
Bangkok United	2021–22	Thai League 1	26	1	1	0	2	0	—		—		29	1
Bangkok United	2022–23	Thai League 1	26	0	5	0	1	0	—		1	0	33	0
Bangkok United	2023–24	Thai League 1	28	1	4	0	2	0	8	0	—		42	1
Bangkok United	Total		125	3	16	1	6	0	9	0	1	0	157	4
Career Total			307	12	23	1	11	1	20	0	3	0	364	14

=== International ===
As of match played 7 September 2023

National team	Year	Apps	Goals
Thailand	2013	1	0
Thailand	2014	8	0
Thailand	2015	3	0
Thailand	2016	6	1
Thailand	2017	7	0
Thailand	2018	4	0
Thailand	2022	4	0
Thailand	2023	3	0
Total		36	1

=== International goals ===
#	Date	Venue	Opponent	Score	Result	Competition
1.	19 November 2016	Philippine Sports Stadium, Bocaue, Philippines	Indonesia	1–0	4–2	2016 AFF Championship

== Honours ==
=== Club ===
BEC Tero Sasana

- Thai League Cup: 2014

Muangthong United

- Thai League 1: 2016
- Thai League Cup (2): 2016, 2017
- Thailand Champions Cup: 2017
- Mekong Club Championship: 2017

Bangkok United

- Thailand Champions Cup: 2023
- Thai FA Cup: 2023–24

=== International ===
Thailand U-19

- AFF U-19 Youth Championship; 2011

Thailand U-23

- Sea Games Gold Medal (2); 2013, 2015

Thailand

- AFF Championship (2): 2014, 2016
- King's Cup (2): 2016, 2017

=== Individual ===
- AFF Championship Best XI: 2014
