= Everton (footballer, born 1990) =

Brazilian footballer

Personal information
- Full name: Everton Gonçalves Saturnino
- Date of birth: 5 February 1990 (age 36)
- Place of birth: Sapezal, Brazil
- Height: 1.85 m (6 ft 1 in)
- Position: Centre-back

Team information
- Current team: Bangkok United
- Number: 3

Senior career*
Years	Team	Apps	(Gls)
2011	Paranavaí	15	(1)
2012	Toledo	20	(0)
2013	São José	15	(0)
2014–2015	Lajeadense	29	(1)
2015–2016	Luverdense	72	(1)
2017	Chiangrai United	30	(3)
2018–	Bangkok United	215	(27)
- * Club domestic league appearances and goals as of 9 January 2026

Everton Gonçalves Saturnino (born 5 February 1990), simply known as Everton, is a Brazilian footballer who plays for Bangkok United as a centre-back.

== Career ==
=== Paranavaí ===
Everton made his league debut against Cianorte on 26 January 2011. He scored his first goal against Paraná on 27 March 2011, scoring in the 27th minute.

=== Toledo ===
Everton made his league debut against Coritiba on 22 January 2012.

=== São José ===
Everton made his league debut against Pelotas on 19 January 2013.

=== Lajeadense ===
Everton made his league debut against Passo Fundo on 19 January 2014. He scored his first goal for the club against São José RS on 1 March 2014, scoring in the 33rd minute.

=== Luverdense ===
Everton made his league debut against Náutico on 9 May 2015. He scored his first goal against Paysandu on 3 September 2016, scoring in the 25th minute.

=== Chiangrai United ===
Everton made his league debut against Super Power Samut Prakan on 12 February 2017. He scored his first goal for the club against Navy on 11 March 2017, scoring in the 75th minute.

=== Bangkok United ===
Everton joined Bangkok. He made his league debut against Muangthong United on 10 February 2018. Everton scored his first goal against Port on 7 April 2018, scoring in the 9th minute.

== Career statistics ==
As of match played 30 April 2025

Appearances and goals by club, season and competition
Club	Season	League			Cup		League Cup		Continental		Other		Total	
Club	Season	Division	Apps	Goals	Apps	Goals	Apps	Goals	Apps	Goals	Apps	Goals	Apps	Goals
Luverdense	2015	Série B	36	0	—		—		—		—		36	0
Luverdense	2016	Série B	36	1	—		—		—		2	0	38	1
Luverdense	Total		72	1	—		—		—		2	0	74	1
Chiangrai United	2017	Thai League 1	30	3	6	1	4	0	—		—		40	4
Bangkok United	2018	Thai League 1	32	7	1	0	1	0	—		—		34	7
Bangkok United	2019	Thai League 1	29	3	4	1	2	1	1	0	—		36	5
Bangkok United	2020–21	Thai League 1	28	3	5	0	—		—		—		33	3
Bangkok United	2021–22	Thai League 1	29	3	2	0	3	0	—		—		34	3
Bangkok United	2022–23	Thai League 1	25	3	2	0	2	0	—		—		29	3
Bangkok United	2023–24	Thai League 1	29	5	5	2	2	0	8	1	—		44	8
Bangkok United	2024–25	Thai League 1	28	2	3	0	2	0	9	0	—		42	2
Bangkok United	Total		200	26	22	3	12	1	18	1	—		252	31
Career total			302	30	28	4	16	1	18	1	2	0	366	36

== Honours ==
=== Club ===
Lajeadense

- Copa FGF: 2014

Luverdense

- Campeonato Mato-Grossense: 2016

Chiangrai United

- Thai FA Cup: 2017

Bangkok United

- Thailand Champions Cup: 2023
- Thai FA Cup: 2023–24
