= Mahmoud Eid =

Footballer (born 1993)

Personal information
- Full name: Mahmoud Khair Mohammed Dahadha
- Date of birth: 26 June 1993 (age 33)
- Place of birth: Nyköping, Sweden
- Height: 1.83 m (6 ft 0 in)
- Positions: Winger; forward

Team information
- Current team: Odisha

Youth career
- 2001–2008: Nyköpings BIS
- 2009–2011: Hammarby

Senior career*
Years	Team	Apps	(Gls)
2011–2012	Hammarby Talang FF	1	(0)
2012–2013	Vasalund IF	31	(6)
2013–2016	Nyköpings BIS	31	(21)
2016	Åtvidaberg	16	(8)
2016–2020	Kalmar FF	25	(2)
2018	→ Mjøndalen IF (loan)	10	(3)
2018	→ GAIS (loan)	10	(1)
2020–2021	Persebaya Surabaya	2	(1)
2021	Mesaimeer	11	(5)
2021	Al-Muharraq	0	(0)
2022	Nongbua Pitchaya	12	(3)
2022–2025	Bangkok United	74	(31)
2025–2026	Thep Xanh Nam Dinh	1	(0)
2026	PVF-CAND	10	(3)
2026–	Odisha	2	(0)

International career
2014–	Palestine	26	(1)
- * Club domestic league appearances and goals as of 17 October 2026

Mahmoud Khair Mohammed Dahadha (Arabic: محمود خير محمد الدحادحة; born 26 June 1993), commonly known as Mahmoud Eid, is a professional footballer who plays as a winger or forward for Indian Super League club Odisha. Born in Sweden, he plays for the Palestine national team.

== Club career ==
A youth product of Hammarby Talang, Eid began his professional career in 2012 with Vasalund IF. Halfway through the 2013 season he joined Nyköping, and then moved to Superettan side Åtvidaberg in January 2016. In August 2016, Eid signed for Kalmar in the Allsvenskan.

On 7 January 2020, he joined Persebaya Surabaya in Indonesia. After experiences in Asia at Mesaimeer (Qatar), Al-Muharraq (Bahrain) and Nongbua Pitchaya (Thailand), Eid switched to fellow Thai club Bangkok United on 30 June 2022.

On 26 July 2025, Eid moved to Vietnam, signing for V.League 1 side Thep Xanh Nam Dinh.

On 15 March 2026, Eid joined PVF-CAND after ending his contract with Thep Xanh Nam Dinh on three days prior.

== International career ==
Born in Sweden, Eid is of Palestinian descent. He was first called up to the Palestine national team in November 2014, ahead of international friendly games against Saudi Arabia and Vietnam. Eid scored his first international goal against the latter team, in a 3–1 win on 9 November.

Eid was called up to the Palestine squad at the 2015 AFC Asian Cup.

== Career statistics ==
=== Club ===
As of match played 12 June 2026

Appearances and goals by club, season and competition
Club	Season	League			National cup (Note: Includes Svenska Cupen, Norwegian Cup, Piala Indonesia, Emir Cup, Bahrain King's Cup, Thai FA Cup, Vietnamese National Cup)		League cup (Note: Includes Thai League Cup)		Continental		Other		Total	
Club	Season	Division	Apps	Goals	Apps	Goals	Apps	Goals	Apps	Goals	Apps	Goals	Apps	Goals
Hammarby Talang FF	2011	Swedish Division 1	16	1	0	0	—		—		—		16	1
Vasalund IF	2012	Swedish Division 1	20	3	1	1	—		—		—		21	4
Vasalund IF	2013	Swedish Division 1	11	3	0	0	—		—		—		11	3
Vasalund IF	Total		31	6	1	1	—		—		—		32	7
Nyköpings BIS	2013	Swedish Division 1	8	6	1	0	—		—		—		9	6
Nyköpings BIS	2014	Swedish Division 1	22	6	1	0	—		—		—		23	6
Nyköpings BIS	2015	Swedish Division 1	18	9	0	0	—		—		—		18	9
Nyköpings BIS	Total		48	21	2	0	—		—		—		50	21
Åtvidaberg	2016	Superettan	16	8	0	0	—		—		—		16	8
Kalmar FF	2016	Allsvenskan	10	2	1	0	—		—		—		11	2
Kalmar FF	2017	Allsvenskan	15	0	3	1	—		—		—		18	1
Kalmar FF	2019	Allsvenskan	10	1	0	0	—		—		0	0	10	1
Kalmar FF	Total		35	3	4	1	—		—		0	0	39	4
Mjøndalen IF (loan)	2018	Norwegian First Division	10	3	1	0	—		—		—		11	3
GAIS (loan)	2018	Superettan	10	1	1	0	—		—		—		11	1
Persebaya Surabaya	2020	Indonesian Liga 1	2	1	—		—		—		—		2	1
Mesaimeer	2020-21	Qatari Second Division	11	5	—		—		—		1 (Note: Appearance(s) in Qatar FA Cup)	0	12	5
Al-Muharraq	2021-22	Bahraini Premier League	?	?	?	?	—		—		—		?	?
Nongbua Pitchaya	2021-22	Thai League 1	12	3	1	0	2	0	—		—		15	3
Bangkok United	2022-23	Thai League 1	26	10	2	1	2	0	—		—		30	11
Bangkok United	2023-24	Thai League 1	24	9	1	0	1	0	8 (Note: Appearance(s) in AFC Champions League)	1	1 (Note: Appearance(s) in Thailand Champions Cup)	1	35	11
Bangkok United	2024-25	Thai League 1	24	12	3	2	1	0	8 (Note: One appearance in AFC Champions League Elite, seven appearances and one goal in AFC Champions League Two)	1	—		37	15
Bangkok United	Total		74	31	6	3	4	0	16	2	1	1	101	37
Thep Xanh Nam Dinh	2025-26	V.League 1	1	0	1	0	—		5 (Note: Appearances in AFC Champions League Two)	0	2 (Note: One appearance in Vietnamese Super Cup, one appearance in ASEAN Club Championship)	0	9	0
PVF-CAND (loan)	2025-26	V.League 1	9	3	1	1	—		—		1 (Note: Appearance in V.League 1 promotion/relegation play-offs)	0	11	4
Career total			275	86	18	6	6	0	21	2	5	1	325	95

=== International ===
As of match played 26 March 2024

Appearances and goals by national team and year
National team	Year	Apps	Goals
Palestine	2014	4	1
Palestine	2015	7	0
Palestine	2016	1	0
Palestine	2018	6	0
Palestine	2019	1	0
Palestine	2021	5	0
Palestine	2024	2	0
Total		26	1

Scores and results list Palestine's goal tally first, score column indicates score after each Eid goal.

List of international goals scored by Mahmoud Eid
No.	Date	Venue	Opponent	Score	Result	Competition	Ref.
1	9 November 2014	Mỹ Đình National Stadium, Hanoi, Vietnam	Vietnam	3–0	3–1	Friendly	

== Honours ==
Persebaya Surabaya

- East Java Governor Cup: 2020

Al Muharraq

- AFC Cup: 2021

Bangkok United

- Thailand Champions Cup: 2023
- Thai FA Cup: 2023–24
