= Tassanapong Muaddarak =

Thai footballer (born 1991)

Personal information
- Full name: Tassanapong Muaddarak
- Date of birth: 12 January 1991 (age 35)
- Place of birth: Khon Kaen, Thailand
- Height: 1.75 m (5 ft 9 in)
- Positions: Defensive midfielder; right back

Team information
- Current team: Sukhothai
- Number: 17

Youth career
- 2010–2011: Pattaya United

Senior career*
Years	Team	Apps	(Gls)
2011-2013	Prachinburi United		
2013-2015	Rangsit		
2015–2019	ฺBangkok Glass / BG Pathum United	63	(0)
2020–2022	Chiangmai	25	(0)
2021–2022	→ Nongbua Pitchaya (loan)	27	(1)
2022–2024	Bangkok United	36	(1)
2024–	Sukhothai	15	(0)
- * Club domestic league appearances and goals as of 12 January 2025

Tassanapong Muaddarak (Thai: ทัศนพงษ์ หมวดดารักษ์, born January 12, 1991) is a Thai professional footballer who plays as a defensive midfielder or right back for Thai League 1 club Sukhothai .

== Club career ==
=== Chiangmai F.C. ===
In 2020, Tassanapong moved from BG Pathum United to join their satellite team, recently relegated Chiangmai F.C. in Thai League 2. Served as a vice captain, he appeared in 25 league games that season, helping The Lanna Tigers finished seventh in the league.

=== Nongbua Pitchaya ===
Despite new contract extension with Chiangmai two months prior, Tassanapong joined the newly-promoted Nongbua Pitchaya on a loan contract for the 2021–22 Thai League 1 season. On 15 January 2022, he scored his first and only goal for the team, an 88th minute header in a 3-2 Thai League 1 home victory against Chonburi F.C. He was a key player in midfield for the north Isan side, starting in 27 from 30 games in the league, helping them finished sixth on their first-ever season on the top flight.

=== Bangkok United ===
On 17 June 2022, Tassanapong joined Bangkok United, reuniting with Aurelio Vidmar whom he worked with at Bangkok Glass F.C.

== Honours ==
=== Club ===
Bangkok United

- Thailand Champions Cup: 2023
- Thai FA Cup: 2023–24
