= Chayawat Srinawong =

Thai footballer

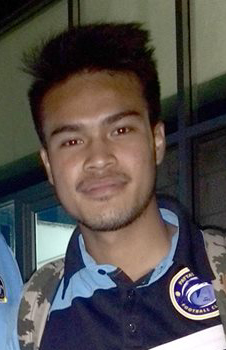
- Srinawong with Pattaya United in 2018

Personal information
- Full name: Chayawat Srinawong
- Date of birth: 12 January 1993 (age 33)
- Place of birth: Bangkok, Thailand
- Height: 1.75 m (5 ft 9 in)
- Positions: Forward; winger

Team information
- Current team: Sukhothai
- Number: 12

Youth career
- 2009–2010: Bangkok Christian College

Senior career*
Years	Team	Apps	(Gls)
2011	Bangkok Christian College	20	(11)
2012–2016	Muangthong United	1	(0)
2012	→ Nakhon Ratchasima (loan)	13	(2)
2013	→ Nakhon Nayok (loan)	15	(8)
2014	→ Bangkok (loan)	18	(2)
2015–2016	→ PTT Rayong (loan)	18	(5)
2016–2018	Pattaya United	81	(8)
2019–2022	Samut Prakan City	72	(17)
2022–2026	Bangkok United	54	(3)
2026–	Sukhothai	0	(0)

International career^{‡}
2011–2012	Thailand U19	11	(3)
2013–2016	Thailand U23	9	(1)
2022	Thailand	4	(0)
- * Club domestic league appearances and goals as of 9 January 2026 ‡ National team caps and goals as of 11 June 2026

Chayawat Srinawong (Thai: ชญาวัต ศรีนาวงษ์, born January 12, 1993) is a Thai professional footballer who plays as a forward or a winger for Thai League 1 club Sukhothai .

== International career ==
In 2016 Chayawat was selected in Thailand U23 squad for 2016 AFC U-23 Championship in Qatar.

== Honours ==
=== Club ===
Bangkok United

- Thai League 1 runners-up: 2022–23
- Thai FA Cup runners-up: 2022–23
- Thailand Champions Cup: 2023
- Thai FA Cup: 2023–24

=== International ===
Thailand U-19

- AFF U-19 Youth Championship
  - Winners (1) : 2011
