= Boontawee Theppawong =

Thai footballer (born 1996)

Personal information
- Full name: Boontawee Theppawong
- Date of birth: 2 January 1996 (age 30)
- Place of birth: Chiang Mai, Thailand
- Height: 1.72 m (5 ft 8 in)
- Position: Right back

Team information
- Current team: Bangkok United
- Number: 96

Youth career
- 2010–2014: Muangthong United

Senior career*
Years	Team	Apps	(Gls)
2014–2023	Muangthong United	56	(1)
2014	→ Nakhon Nayok (loan)	15	(0)
2015	→ Nonthaburi (loan)	10	(0)
2016	→ Pattaya United (loan)	1	(0)
2017	→ Bangkok (loan)	16	(2)
2018–2020	→ Udon Thani (loan)	20	(0)
2023–2026	Bangkok United	13	(0)
- * Club domestic league appearances and goals as of 9 January 2026

Boontawee Theppawong (Thai: บุญทวี เทพวงค์, born 2 January 1996) is a Thai professional footballer who plays as a right back for Thai League 1 club Bangkok United.

== Honours ==
=== Club ===
Bangkok United

- Thailand Champions Cup: 2023
- Thai FA Cup: 2023–24
