= Suphan Thongsong =

Thai footballer

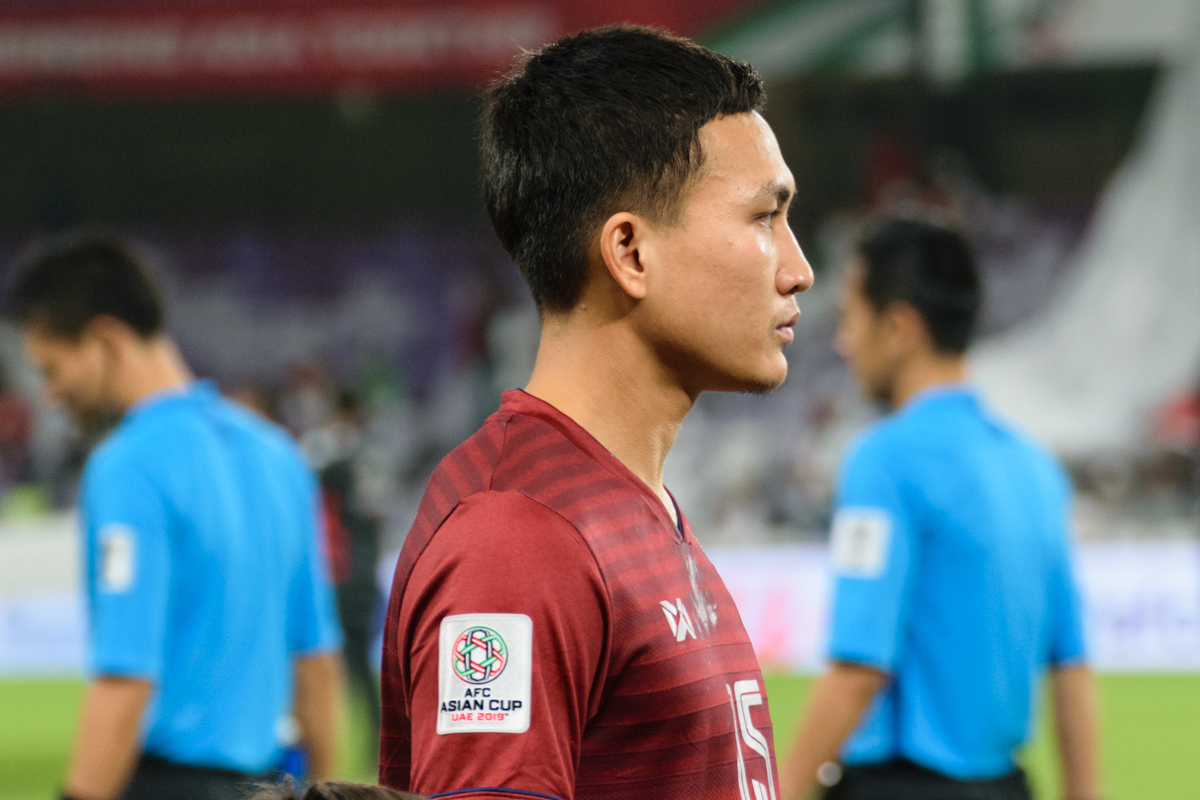

Personal information
- Full name: Suphan Thongsong
- Date of birth: 26 August 1994 (age 32)
- Place of birth: Suphan Buri, Thailand
- Height: 1.83 m (6 ft 0 in)
- Position: Centre back

Team information
- Current team: Bangkok United
- Number: 26

Youth career
- 2010–2012: Assumption College Thonburi

Senior career*
Years	Team	Apps	(Gls)
2013–2017	Muangthong United	33	(0)
2013–2014	→ Assumption United (loan)	28	(1)
2015	→ Samut Songkhram (loan)	17	(0)
2017–2021	Suphanburi	80	(0)
2022–	Bangkok United	85	(3)

International career^{‡}
2014–2016	Thailand U23	5	(0)
2016–	Thailand	20	(0)
- * Club domestic league appearances and goals as of 9 January 2026 ‡ National team caps and goals as of 7 September 2025

Suphan Thongsong (Thai: สุพรรณ ทองสงค์, born 26 August 1994) is a Thai professional footballer who plays as a centre back for Thai League 1 club Bangkok United and the Thailand national team.

== Career statistics ==
=== International ===
As of 7 September 2025

National team	Year	Apps	Goals
Thailand	2017	1	0
Thailand	2018	1	0
Thailand	2019	6	0
Thailand	2021	3	0
Thailand	2023	1	0
Thailand	2024	6	0
Thailand	2025	2	0
Thailand	Total	20	0

== Honours ==
=== Club ===
Muangthong United

- Thai League 1: 2016
- Thai League Cup: 2016
- Thailand Champions Cup: 2017

Bangkok United

- Thailand Champions Cup: 2023
- Thai FA Cup: 2023–24

=== International ===
Thailand

- King's Cup: 2016, 2026
