= Chinnapong Raksri =

Thai footballer

Personal information
- Full name: Chinnapong Raksri
- Date of birth: 14 April 1995 (age 31)
- Place of birth: Suphan Buri, Thailand
- Height: 1.85 m (6 ft 1 in)
- Position: Goalkeeper

Team information
- Current team: Bangkok United
- Number: 38

Youth career
- 2010–2015: BEC Tero Sasana

Senior career*
Years	Team	Apps	(Gls)
2015	BCC Tero	25	(0)
2016	Inter Pattaya	12	(0)
2016–2017	Buriram United	0	(0)
2017	Ratchaburi Mitr Phol	2	(0)
2018	Chiangmai	5	(0)
2018	JL Chiangmai	12	(0)
2019–2020	Police Tero	0	(0)
2020	Sukhothai	0	(0)
2021	Kanchanaburi	9	(0)
2021	Muangkan United	2	(0)
2022–2025	Kanchanaburi	49	(0)
2025–	Bangkok United	0	(0)
- * Club domestic league appearances and goals

Chinnapong Raksri (Thai: ชินพงษ์ รักษี, born 14 April 1995) is a Thai professional footballer who plays as a goalkeeper for Thai League 1 club Bangkok United.
