= Rungrath Poomchantuek =

Thai footballer (born 1992)

Personal information
- Full name: Rungrath Poomchantuek
- Date of birth: 5 January 1992 (age 34)
- Place of birth: Nakhon Ratchasima, Thailand
- Height: 1.73 m (5 ft 8 in)
- Position: Winger

Team information
- Current team: Kasetsart

Youth career
- 2004–2009: Pakchong School
- 2010: Police United

Senior career*
Years	Team	Apps	(Gls)
2011	Lamphun Warriors	17	(2)
2012–2014	Chiangmai	33	(4)
2015–2016	Chiangrai United	51	(4)
2016–2018	Ratchaburi Mitr Phol	35	(4)
2018–2026	Bangkok United	144	(14)
2026	Kanchanaburi Power	0	(0)
2026–	Kasetsart	0	(0)

International career^{‡}
2015	Thailand U23	6	(4)
2015–2024	Thailand	9	(0)
Medal record
Thailand
Southeast Asian Games
Gold medal – first place	Sea Games 2015	Team
Asean Football Championship
Winner	AFF Suzuki Cup 2016	2016
- * Club domestic league appearances and goals as of 9 June 2026 ‡ National team caps and goals as of 17 November 2024

Rungrath Poomchantuek (Thai: รุ่งรัฐ ภูมิจันทึก, born 5 January 1992), is a Thai professional footballer who plays as a winger for Thai League 2 club Kasetsart and the Thailand national team.

== International career ==
In March 2015 Rungrath made his debut for Thailand in a friendly match against Singapore. Rungrath won the 2015 Southeast Asian Games with Thailand U23.

In January 2024, he was named in the 26-man squad for the 2023 AFC Asian Cup in Qatar.

=== International ===
As of 30 January 2024

National team	Year	Apps	Goals
Thailand	2015	1	0
Thailand	2016	3	0
Thailand	2017	1	0
Thailand	2024	4	0
Thailand	Total	9	0

== Honours ==
=== Club ===
Chiangmai FC

- Regional League Northern Division (2): 2012, 2013

Bangkok United

- Thailand Champions Cup: 2023
- Thai FA Cup: 2023–24

=== International ===
Thailand U-23

- Sea Games Gold Medal (1); 2015

Thailand

- ASEAN Football Championship (1): 2016
