= 2023 Thailand Champions Cup =

Daikin Thailand Champions Cup
- Event: Thailand Champions Cup
Buriram United	Bangkok United
0	2
- Date: 5 August 2023
- Venue: Rajamangala National Stadium, Bangkok
- Man of the Match: Nitipong Selanon
- Referee: Torphong Somsing (Thailand)
- Attendance: 10,824
- Weather: Mostly cloudy 29 °C (84 °F) humidity 72%

The 2023 Thailand Champions Cup was the 7th Thailand Champions Cup, an annual football match played between the winners of the previous season's Thai League 1 and Thai FA Cup. As Buriram United won both competitions in 2022–23, their opponents were the 2022–23 Thai League 1 runners-up, Bangkok United. It was sponsored by Daikin, and known as the Daikin Thailand Champions Cup (Thai: ไดกิ้น ไทยแลนด์แชมเปียนส์คัพ) for sponsorship purposes. The match was played on 5 August 2023 at the Rajamangala National Stadium in Bang Kapi, Bangkok. It has live broadcast on PPTV HD and AIS Play.

== Qualified teams ==
Team	Qualification	Qualified date	Participation
Buriram United	Winners of the 2022–23 Thai League 1	22 April 2023	4th
Bangkok United	Runners-up of the 2022–23 Thai League 1	28 May 2023	1st

== Match ==
=== Details ===
5 August 2023
18:00 UTC+7

Buriram United	0–2	Bangkok United
	Report; News; Highlight	Willen 8'; Mahmoud Eid 50'

Rajamangala National Stadium,
Bang Kapi, Bangkok
Attendance: 10,824
Referee: Torphong Somsing (Thailand)

Buriram United	Bangkok United

Lineups:
GK	1	(Thailand) Siwarak Tedsungnoen
RB	15	(Thailand) Narubadin Weerawatnodom (c)	(substituted off) 79'
CB	11	(Malaysia) Dion Cools
CB	3	(Thailand) Pansa Hemviboon	(substituted off) 46'
LB	5	(Thailand) Theerathon Bunmathan	(substituted off) 90+4'
DM	6	(Thailand) Peeradon Chamratsamee
DM	20	(Serbia) Goran Čaušić
RM	2	(Thailand) Sasalak Haiprakhon
AM	9	(Thailand) Supachai Chaided
LM	10	(Azerbaijan) Ramil Sheydayev
CF	26	(Guinea) Lonsana Doumbouya
Substitutes:
GK	59	(Thailand) Nopphon Lakhonphon
DF	14	(Thailand) Chitipat Tanklang
DF	25	(Thailand) Suporn Peenagatapho	(substituted in) 79'
DF	49	(Thailand) Piyawat Petra
DF	92	(South Korea) Kim Min-hyeok	(substituted in) 46'
MF	4	(Thailand) Leon James
MF	8	(Thailand) Ratthanakorn Maikami	(substituted in) 90+4'
FW	29	(Thailand) Arthit Boodjinda
FW	77	(Thailand) Paripan Wongsa
Head Coach:
(Japan) Masatada Ishii

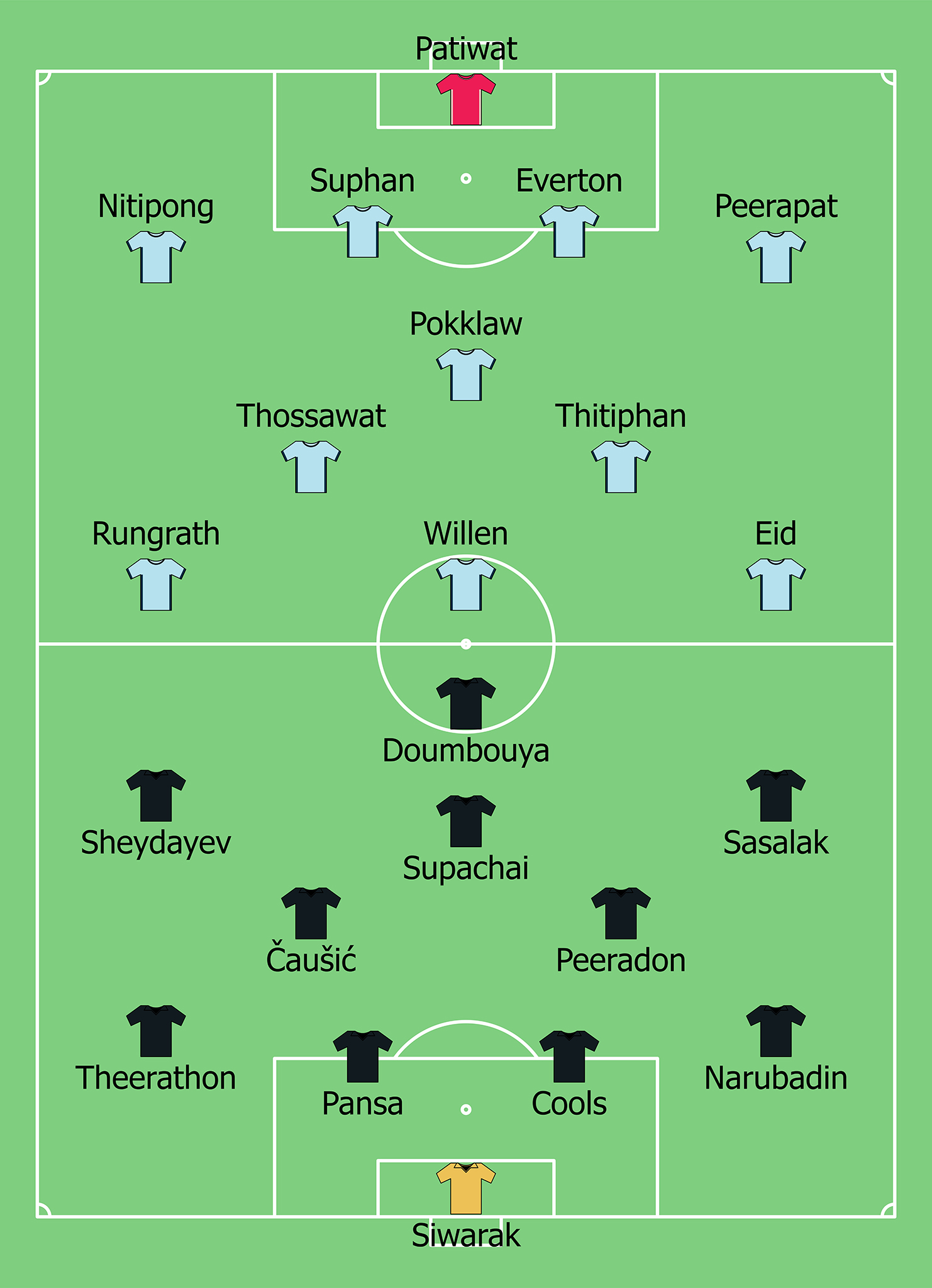

Lineups:
GK	1	(Thailand) Patiwat Khammai
RB	6	(Thailand) Nitipong Selanon
CB	26	(Thailand) Suphan Thongsong
CB	3	(Brazil) Everton (c)		(yellow card) 33'
LB	2	(Thailand) Peerapat Notchaiya			(substituted off) 87'
CM	28	(Thailand) Thossawat Limwannasathian			(substituted off) 83'
DM	39	(Thailand) Pokklaw Anan			(substituted off) 87'
CM	18	(Thailand) Thitiphan Puangchan		(yellow card) 22'
RF	11	(Thailand) Rungrath Poomchantuek			(substituted off) 87'
CF	29	(Brazil) Willen	8'
LF	93	(Palestine) Mahmoud Eid	50'	(yellow card) 54'	(substituted off) 74'
Substitutes:
GK	34	(Thailand) Warut Mekmusik
DF	4	(Thailand) Manuel Bihr
DF	5	(Thailand) Putthinan Wannasri
DF	24	(Thailand) Wanchai Jarunongkran			(substituted in) 74'
DF	96	(Thailand) Boontawee Theppawong			(substituted in) 87'
MF	8	(Thailand) Wisarut Imura			(substituted in) 87'
MF	17	(Thailand) Tassanapong Muaddarak			(substituted in) 83'
MF	30	(Thailand) Ratchanat Arunyapairot
FW	20	(Thailand) Chananan Pombuppha			(substituted in) 87'
Head Coach:
(Thailand) Totchtawan Sripan

Assistant referees:
(Thailand) Tanate Chuchuen
(Thailand) Rachain Srichai
Fourth official:
(Thailand) Vitsavet Sangnakorn
Assistant VAR:
(Thailand) Kotchapoom Meesridaecha
(Thailand) Apichit Nophuan

MATCH RULES

- 90 minutes.
- Penalty shoot-out if necessary.
- Maximum of five substitutions in three substitutes.

=== Statistics ===
First half
Statistic	Buriram United	Bangkok United
Goals scored	0	1
Total shots	6	7
Shots on target	3	2
Saves	1	3
Corner kicks	5	2
Fouls committed	5	12
Offsides	0	0
Yellow cards	0	2
Red cards	0	0

Second half
Statistic	Buriram United	Bangkok United
Goals scored	0	1
Total shots	6	2
Shots on target	4	2
Saves	1	4
Corner kicks	1	1
Fouls committed	7	10
Offsides	2	0
Yellow cards	0	1
Red cards	0	0

Overall
Statistic	Buriram United	Bangkok United
Goals scored	0	2
Total shots	12	9
Shots on target	7	4
Saves	2	7
Corner kicks	6	3
Fouls committed	12	22
Offsides	2	0
Yellow cards	0	3
Red cards	0	0

== Winner ==
2023 Thailand Champions Cup
Winners
Bangkok United
First Title

== See also ==
- 2023–24 Thai League 1
- 2023–24 Thai League 2
- 2023–24 Thai League 3
- 2023–24 Thai League 3 Northern Region
- 2023–24 Thai League 3 Northeastern Region
- 2023–24 Thai League 3 Eastern Region
- 2023–24 Thai League 3 Western Region
- 2023–24 Thai League 3 Southern Region
- 2023–24 Thai League 3 Bangkok Metropolitan Region
- 2023–24 Thai League 3 National Championship
- 2023–24 Thai League 3 Cup
- 2023–24 Thai FA Cup
- 2023–24 Thai League Cup
