= Nitipong Selanon =

Thai footballer (born 1993)

Personal information
- Full name: Nitipong Selanon
- Date of birth: 25 May 1993 (age 33)
- Place of birth: Ratchaburi, Thailand
- Height: 1.67 m (5 ft 5 1/2 in)
- Position: Right-back

Team information
- Current team: Port
- Number: 34

Youth career
- 2010–2011: Chonburi

Senior career*
Years	Team	Apps	(Gls)
2012–2014	Chonburi	0	(0)
2012–2014	→ Saraburi (loan)	27	(4)
2014–2015	Buriram United	18	(1)
2015	→ Saraburi (loan)	7	(0)
2015	→ Port (loan)	16	(1)
2016–2022	Port	142	(5)
2022	Chiangrai United	9	(0)
2022–2026	Bangkok United	86	(7)
2026–	Port	0	(0)

International career^{‡}
2011–2012	Thailand U19	3	(0)
2014–2016	Thailand U23	5	(0)
2018–2024	Thailand	6	(0)
Medal record
Thailand under-19
AFF U-19 Youth Championship
Winner	AFF U-19 Youth Championship 2011	Football
- * Club domestic league appearances and goals as of 9 January 2026 ‡ National team caps and goals as of 21 November 2023

Nitipong Selanon (Thai: นิติพงษ์ เสลานนท์, born 25 May 1993) is a Thai professional footballer who plays as a right-back for Thai League 1 club Port and the Thailand national team.

== International career ==
Nitipong won the AFF U-19 Youth Championship with Thailand U19, and played in 2012 AFC U-19 Championship.

In March, 2018 he was in the squad of Thailand for 2018 King's Cup, but did not make an appearance.

== Honours ==
Buriram United

- Thai Premier League: 2014

Port

- Thai FA Cup: 2019

Bangkok United

- Thailand Champions Cup: 2023
- Thai FA Cup: 2023–24

Thailand U-19

- AFF U-19 Youth Championship: 2011
