= Pokklaw Anan =

Thai footballer (born 1991)

Personal information
- Full name: Pokklaw Anan
- Date of birth: 4 March 1991 (age 35)
- Place of birth: Bangkok, Thailand
- Height: 1.80 m (5 ft 11 in)
- Position: Attacking midfielder

Team information
- Current team: Bangkok United
- Number: 39

Youth career
- 2003–2008: Suankularb Wittayalai School

Senior career*
Years	Team	Apps	(Gls)
2009–2010	Thai Honda	28	(3)
2011–2015	Police United	89	(13)
2016	Chonburi	20	(4)
2017–	Bangkok United	223	(28)

International career
2010	Thailand U19	6	(0)
2011–2014	Thailand U23	18	(5)
2011–	Thailand	51	(6)
Medal record
Thailand under-23
Sea Games
Gold medal – first place	Sea Games 2013	Football
Thailand
Asean Football Championship
Winner	Suzuki Cup 2016	2016
Winner	Suzuki Cup 2020	2020
Runner-up	Hyundai Cup 2026	2026
- * Club domestic league appearances and goals as of 9 January 2026

Pokklaw Anan (Thai: ปกเกล้า อนันต์, pronounced [pòk.klâːw ʔā.nān]; born 4 March 1991), simply known as Pok (Thai: ปก), is a Thai professional footballer who plays as an attacking midfielder for Thai League 1 club Bangkok United and the Thailand national team.

== International career ==
Pokklaw was called up to the national team, in coach Winfried Schäfer first squad selection for the 2014 FIFA World Cup qualification. He scored his debut goal against China outside the box in a friendly match. He represented Thailand U23 in the 2011 Southeast Asian Games and the 2013 Southeast Asian Games. He represented Thailand U23 in the 2014 Asian Games. In May 2015, Pokklaw scored Thailand's winning goal in the 2018 World Cup qualifier against Vietnam.

=== International goals ===
==== Senior ====
Scores and results list Thailand's goal tally first.

No	Date	Venue	Opponent	Score	Result	Competition
1.	15 June 2013	Hefei Olympic Sports Center Stadium, Hefei, China	China	1–0	5–1	Friendly
2.	26 March 2015	80th Birthday Stadium, Nakhon Ratchasima, Thailand	Singapore	2–0	2–0	Friendly
3.	24 May 2015	Rajamangala Stadium, Bangkok, Thailand	Vietnam	1–0	1–0	2018 FIFA World Cup qualification
4.	12 November 2015	Rajamangala Stadium, Bangkok, Thailand	Chinese Taipei	2–1	4–2	2018 FIFA World Cup qualification
5.	5 September 2017	Melbourne Rectangular Stadium, Melbourne, Australia	Australia	1–1	1–2	2018 FIFA World Cup qualification
6.	17 November 2018	Rajamangala Stadium, Bangkok, Thailand	Indonesia	4–1	4–2	2018 AFF Championship

== Honours ==
=== Club ===
Police United

- Thai Division 1 League (1): 2015

Bangkok United

- Thailand Champions Cup: 2023
- Thai FA Cup: 2023–24

=== International ===
Thailand U-23

- Sea Games Gold Medal (1): 2013

Thailand

- AFF Championship (2): 2016, 2020
- King's Cup (1): 2017
