= 2016 Suphanburi F.C. season =

Suphanburi
2016 season
- Chairman: Varawut Silpa-archa
- Manager: Sérgio Farias
- Stadium: Suphan Buri Provincial Stadium, Mueang Suphan Buri, Suphan Buri, Thailand
- Thai League: 10th
- Thai FA Cup: Quarter-finals
- Thai League Cup: Round of 32
- Top goalscorer: League: Guilherme Dellatorre (10); All: Guilherme Dellatorre (13)

The 2016 season is Suphanburi's 6th season in the Thai Premier League of Suphanburi Football Club. Since 2006–2007 and 2013 to present.

== Foreign players ==
Note: Flags indicate national team as defined under FIFA eligibility rules; some limited exceptions apply. Players may hold more than one non-FIFA nationality.

No.	Pos.	Nation	Player
6	DF	BRA	Márcio Rosário
8	MF	BRA	Luiz Otávio
9	FW	BRA	Guilherme Dellatorre
13	MF	KOR	Jung Hoon
32	FW	ESP	Carmelo González

== Pre-season and friendlies ==
Date	Opponents	H / A	Result F–A	Scorer(s)
18 January 2016	(Singapore) Hougang United	H	2–1	Chitchanok 55, Janepob 59'
22 January 2016	Samut Songkhram R-Airlines	H	1–1	Dellatorre 33'
29 January 2016	Chulalongkorn University	H	6–1	Dellatorre 30', Janepob (2) 35', 60', Prasit 46', Thossaphol 78', Tinnakorn 82'
2 February 2016	Lamphun Warrior	N	1–1	Janepob 23'
5 February 2016	Lampang	N	3–1	Chakrit 25', Thossaphol (2) 72', 78'
7 February 2016	(Japan) Albirex Niigata	N	0–2	

== Thai League ==
Pos	Team	Pld	W	D	L	GF	GA	GD	Pts
8	Chiangrai United	31	13	6	12	42	43	−1	45
9	BEC Tero Sasana	30	12	5	13	42	52	−10	41
10	Suphanburi	31	10	8	13	33	35	−2	38
11	Nakhon Ratchasima	31	10	5	16	30	44	−14	35
12	Pattaya United	31	9	7	15	46	66	−20	34

Updated to match(es) played on 25 September 2016. Source: Thai League
Rules for classification: 1) points; 2) goal difference; 3) number of goals scored.

Date	Opponents	H / A	Result F–A	Scorers	League position
5 March 2016	Chiangrai United	A	0–1		14th
9 March 2016	Chonburi	A	2–1	Tinnakorn 10', Dellatorre 83'	11th
12 March 2016	Pattaya United	H	0–0		9th
16 March 2016	Sisaket	H	1–0	Carmelo 76'	5th
30 March 2016	Buriram United	A	2–2	Prat 54', Jakkapan 69' (pen.)	9th
3 April 2016	Sukhothai	H	2–3	Rosário 59', Napat 90+3'	10th
24 April 2016	BBCU	A	3–2	Carmelo (2) 4', 16', Dellatorre 73'	8th
27 April 2016	Chainat Hornbill	H	1–0	Jakkapan 90+1' (pen.)	8th
30 April 2016	Osotspa M-150 Samut Prakan	A	0–0		7th
8 May 2016	Army United	H	1–0	Carmelo 23'	6th
11 May 2016	SCG Muangthong United	A	0–1		7th
15 May 2016	BEC Tero Sasana	H	0–0		8th
21 May 2016	Nakhon Ratchasima Mazda	A	0–0		8th
28 May 2016	Bangkok Glass	H	1–2	Rangsan 71'	8th
12 June 2016	Navy	A	1–1	Dellatorre 43' (pen.)	8th
18 June 2016	Bangkok United	H	0–1		8th
22 June 2016	Ratchaburi Mitr Phol	A	1–2	Carmelo 76'	10th
25 June 2016	Chiangrai United	H	2–0	Darko 25', Chitchanok 73'	9th
29 June 2016	Chonburi	H	0–0		10th
2 July 2016	Pattaya NNK United (Note: In mid-2016, Pattaya United change the name to Pattaya NNK United due to their take sponsor.)	A	1–3	Seung-yong 85'	10th
9 July 2016	Buriram United	H	1–2	Dellatorre 4'	11th
17 July 2016	Sukhothai	A	0–1		12th
20 July 2016	BBCU	H	2–1	Chappuis 60', Thritthi 66'	10th
23 July 2016	Chainat Hornbill	A	1–1	Chananan 42'	10th
30 July 2016	Super Power Samut Prakan (Note: In mid-2016, Osotspa M-150 Samut Prakan change the name to Super Power Samut Prakan due to their take over.)	H	2–3	Chappuis (2) 58' (pen.), 66'	10th
6 August 2016	Army United	A	1–0	Darko 2'	10th
14 August 2016	SCG Muangthong United	H	0–1		10th
20 August 2016	BEC Tero Sasana	A	0–2		10th
10 September 2016	Nakhon Ratchasima Mazda	H	3–1	Dellatorre (2) 55', 67', Chananan 82'	10th
18 September 2016	Bangkok Glass	A	1–3	Dellatorre 32'	10th
25 September 2016	Navy	H	4–1	Dellatorre (3) 44', 69', 90', Chananan 81'	10th

== Thai FA Cup ==
Chang FA Cup

Date	Opponents	H / A	Result F–A	Scorers	Round
15 June 2016	TA Benchamarachuthit	A	6–0	Napat (3) 2', 10', 78', Tinnakorn 20', Chitchanok 82', Dellatorre 84'	Round of 64
13 July 2016	Krung Thonburi	H	3–0	Dellatorre 25', Natthaphong 48', Darko 80'	Round of 32
3 August 2016	Chiangrai United	H	1–0	Thanasit 85'	Round of 16
21 September 2016	Chainat Hornbill	A	2–3	Dellatorre 28' (pen.), Darko 45+3'	Quarter-finals

== Thai League Cup ==
Toyota League Cup

Date	Opponents	H / A	Result F–A	Scorers	Round
10 April 2016	Ayutthaya United	A	1–0	Prat 36'	Round of 64
8 June 2016	Krabi	A	1–4	Thossaphol 5'	Round of 32

== Squad goals statistics ==
No.	Pos.	Name	League	FA Cup	League Cup	Total
1	GK	(Thailand) Pattanan Pijittham	0	0	0	0
2	DF	(Thailand) Wasan Homsan	0	0	0	0
3	DF	(Thailand) Patipan Un-Op	0	0	0	0
4	DF	(Thailand) Natthaphong Samana	0	1	0	1
5	DF	(Thailand) Thritthi Nonsrichai	1	0	0	1
6	DF	(Brazil) Márcio Rosário	1	0	0	1
7	FW	(Thailand) Chananan Pombuppha	3	0	0	3
8	MF	(Brazil) Luiz Otávio	0	0	0	0
9	FW	(Brazil) Guilherme Dellatorre	10	3	0	13
10	MF	(Thailand) Charyl Chappuis	3	0	0	3
11	MF	(Thailand) Thanasit Siriphala	0	1	0	1
13	MF	(South Korea) Jung Hoon	0	0	0	0
14	MF	(Thailand) Paitoon Nontadee	0	0	0	0
15	MF	(Thailand) Suban Ngernprasert	0	0	0	0
16	MF	(Thailand) Rattana Petch-Aporn	0	0	0	0
17	MF	(Thailand) Rangsan Viwatchaichok	1	0	0	1
18	GK	(Thailand) Sinthaweechai Hathairattanakool	0	0	0	0
19	FW	(Thailand) Chitchanok Xaysensourinthone	1	1	0	2
20	FW	(South Korea) Kim Seung-yong	1	0	0	1
22	MF	(North Macedonia) Darko Tasevski	2	2	0	4
23	MF	(Thailand) Chakrit Buathong	0	0	0	0
24	FW	(Thailand) Thossaphol Yodchan	0	0	1	1
25	DF	(Thailand) Tinnakorn Asurin	1	1	0	2
28	FW	(Thailand) Napat Thamrongsupakorn	1	3	0	4
30	DF	(Thailand) Supoj Wonghoi	0	0	0	0
34	FW	(Thailand) Attapon Kannoo	0	0	0	0
38	DF	(Thailand) Apisit Kamwang	0	0	0	0
Out on loan
–	GK	(Thailand) Boonyakait Wongsajaem	0	0	0	0
–	FW	(Thailand) Janepob Phokhi	0	0	0	0
–	MF	(Thailand) Prasit Jantum	0	0	0	0
Left club during season
–	MF	(Thailand) Jakkapan Pornsai	2	0	0	2
–	FW	(Spain) Carmelo González	5	0	0	5
–	DF	(Thailand) Pratum Chuthong	0	0	0	0
–	DF	(Thailand) Prat Samakrat	1	0	1	2
–	MF	(Thailand) Wattanasap Jarernsri	0	0	0	0
–	GK	(Thailand) Puthasas Boonpok	0	0	0	0
–	MF	(Thailand) Apiwich Phulek	0	0	0	0

== Transfers ==
First Thai footballer's market is opening on 14 December 2015, to 28 January 2016
Second Thai footballer's market is opening on 3 June 2016, to 30 June 2016

=== In ===
Date	Pos.	Name	From
14 December 2015	MF	(Thailand) Rattana Petch-Aporn	(Thailand) Ratchaburi Mitr Phol
19 December 2015	DF	(Thailand) Wasan Homsaen	(Thailand) Bangkok Glass
25 December 2015	GK	(Thailand) Sinthaweechai Hathairattanakool	(Thailand) Chonburi
30 December 2015	MF	(Brazil) Luiz Otávio	(Japan) Júbilo Iwata
6 January 2016	MF	(Thailand) Paitoon Nontadee	(Thailand) Bangkok United
15 January 2016	MF	(Iran) Reza Haghighi	(Iran) Saba Qom
17 January 2016	DF	(Thailand) Tinnakorn Asurin	(Thailand) Saraburi
27 January 2016	MF	(Thailand) Rangsan Viwatchaichok	(Thailand) BEC Tero Sasana
19 February 2016	MF	(South Korea) Jung Hoon	(South Korea) Jeonbuk Hyundai Motors
26 May 2016	MF	(Thailand) Thanasit Siriphala	(Thailand) Bangkok Glass
26 May 2016	MF	(Thailand) Suban Ngernprasert	(Thailand) Bangkok Glass
9 June 2016	MF	(North Macedonia) Darko Tasevski	(Thailand) Bangkok Glass
25 June 2016	GK	(Thailand) Adisak Boonthawee	(Thailand) Simork
15 July 2016	FW	(Thailand) Chananan Pombuppha	(Thailand) SCG Muangthong United

=== Out ===
Date	Pos.	Name	To
22 December 2015	FW	(Brazil) André Luís	(Thailand) Navy
25 December 2015	MF	(South Korea) Lee Seung-hee	(Japan) Nagoya Grampus
25 December 2015	MF	(Thailand) Kriangkrai Pimrat	(Thailand) PTT Rayong
25 December 2015	MF	(Thailand) Baworn Tapla	(Thailand) Osotspa M-150 Samut Prakan
2 January 2015	FW	(Indonesia) Sergio van Dijk	(Australia) Adelaide United
7 January 2016	MF	(Thailand) Decha Sa-ardchom	(Thailand) PTT Rayong
17 January 2016	GK	(Thailand) Anurak Chompoopruk	(Thailand) PTT Rayong
20 January 2016	MF	(Thailand) Natthawut Singharaj	(Thailand) Chiangmai
15 February 2016	DF	(Thailand) Piyarat Lajungreed	(Thailand) Sukhothai
15 February 2016	MF	(Iran) Reza Haghighi	(Iran) Naft Tehran
26 May 2016	MF	(Thailand) Jakkapan Pornsai	(Thailand) Bangkok Glass
31 May 2016	FW	(Spain) Carmelo González	(United Arab Emirates) Al-Ittihad Kalba
7 June 2016	DF	(Thailand) Pratum Chuthong	(Thailand) Chiangrai United
22 June 2016	DF	(Thailand) Prat Samakrat	(Thailand) Bangkok United
24 June 2016	MF	(Thailand) Wattanasap Jarernsri	(Thailand) Chiangmai
24 June 2016	GK	(Thailand) Puthasas Boonpok	(Thailand) Samut Sakhon
25 June 2016	DF	(Thailand) Apiwich Phulek	(Thailand) Bangkok Glass
29 June 2016	FW	(Thailand) Attapon Kannoo	(Thailand) Army United
15 July 2016	MF	(Thailand) Chinnawat Tawichsang	(Thailand) Krabi

=== Loan in ===
Date from	Date to	Pos.	Name	From
31 December 2015	31 December 2016	FW	(Brazil) Guilherme Dellatorre	(Brazil) Atlético Paranaense
17 June 2016	31 December 2016	DF	(Thailand) Patipan Un-Op	(Thailand) Buriram United
24 June 2016	31 December 2016	MF	(South Korea) Kim Seung-yong	(Thailand) Buriram United
5 July 2016	31 December 2016	DF	(Thailand) Thritthi Nonsrichai	(Thailand) Bangkok United

=== Loan out ===
Date from	Date to	Pos.	Name	To
17 June 2016	31 December 2016	GK	(Thailand) Boonyakait Wongsajaem	(Thailand) PTT Rayong
15 July 2016	31 December 2016	MF	(Thailand) Prasit Jantum	(Thailand) Lampang
15 July 2016	31 December 2016	FW	(Thailand) Janepob Phokhi	(Thailand) Lampang
