= 2015 Suphanburi F.C. season =

Suphanburi
2015 season
- Chairman: Varawut Silpa-archa
- Manager: Sérgio Farias (Last season – 13 August 2015); Worrawoot Srimaka (Caretaker on 13 August 2015 – Present)
- Stadium: Suphanburi Municipality Stadium
- Thai Premier League: 3rd
- Thai FA Cup: Round of 32
- Thai League Cup: Round of 32
- Top goalscorer: League: Sergio van Dijk (14); All: Sergio van Dijk (14)
| Home colours | Away colours | Third colours |

The 2015 season is Suphanburi's fifth season in the Thai Premier League of Suphanburi Football Club. Since 2006–2007 and 2013 to present.

== Pre-season and friendlies ==
| Date | Opponents | H / A | Result F–A | Scorers |
|---|---|---|---|---|
| 23 January 2015 | (South Korea) Goyang Hi | N | 1–0 | Carmelo 45' |
| 25 January 2015 | Chonburi | A | 3–2 | Korrakot 29' (o.g.), Carmelo 69', Luís 90' |
| 1 February 2015 | Ang Thong | A | 3–0 | Luís (2) 1', 39', Banlue 90+1' |
| 6 February 2015 | (South Korea) Busan IPark | H | 1–1 | Jakkraphan 7' |

== Thai Premier League ==
| Pos | Team | Pld | W | D | L | GF | GA | GD | Pts | Qualification or relegation |
|---|---|---|---|---|---|---|---|---|---|---|
| 1 | Buriram United (C, Q) | 34 | 25 | 9 | 0 | 98 | 24 | +74 | 84 | 2016 AFC Champions League group stage |
| 2 | Muangthong United (Q) | 34 | 21 | 8 | 5 | 81 | 35 | +46 | 71 | 2016 AFC Champions League Qualifying play-off (Note: The winners of the 2015 Thai FA Cup will also qualify for the play-off of the 2016 AFC Champions League. Since the FA Cup winners have already qualified to ACL through the championship and runners-up - because the Thai FA Cup Final is between Buriram and Muangthong - the spot will be awarded to the third-placed team.) |
| 3 | Suphanburi | 34 | 16 | 11 | 7 | 60 | 39 | +21 | 59 | |
| 4 | Chonburi (Q) | 34 | 15 | 12 | 7 | 62 | 44 | +18 | 57 (Note: CHO 1–0 BKU; BKU 1–1 CHO) | 2016 AFC Champions League Qualifying play-off |
| 5 | Bangkok United | 34 | 16 | 9 | 9 | 59 | 47 | +12 | 57 | |

Updated to match(es) played on 13 December 2015. Source: Thai Premier League
Rules for classification: 1) points; 2) head-to-head points; 3) head-to-head goal difference; 4) goal difference; 5) number of goals scored
(C) Champions; (Q) Qualified for the phase indicated
Notes:

| Date | Opponents | H / A | Result F–A | Scorers | League position |
|---|---|---|---|---|---|
| 15 February 2015 | Osotspa M-150 | A | 1–1; Highlight | Rosário 53' | 12th |
| 22 February 2015 | Nakhon Ratchasima Mazda | H | 1–0; Highlight | Jakkraphan 56' (pen.) | 9th |
| 28 February 2015 | Gulf Saraburi | A | 3–1; Highlight | Jakkraphan (2) 38', 72', Luís 74' | 1st |
| 7 March 2015 | Buriram United | H | 2–2; Highlight | Jakkraphan 43', van Dijk 89' | 3rd |
| 11 March 2015 | Port MTI | A | 2–0; Highlight | Luís 47', Carmelo 77' | 3rd |
| 4 April 2015 | SCG Muangthong United | H | 2–1; Highlight | Jakkraphan 54', van Dijk 58' | 1st |
| 25 April 2015 | Sisaket | H | 2–1; Highlight | Jakkraphan 51' (pen.), van Dijk 72' | 1st |
| 29 April 2015 | Chiangrai United | A | 2–3; Highlight | Jakkraphan 36', P.Jetsada 90+4' | 2nd |
| 3 May 2015 | Chonburi | H | 0–0; Highlight | | 3rd |
| 9 May 2015 | Navy | A | 1–1; Highlight | Apisit 39' | 5th |
| 20 June 2015 | Bangkok United | H | 1–1; Highlight | van Dijk 66' | 6th |
| 28 June 2015 | TOT | A | 2–2; Highlight | Jakkraphan 45', Luís 47' | 6th |
| 4 July 2015 | Ratchaburi Mitr Phol | H | 2–0; Highlight | Luís 35', van Dijk 38' | 4th |
| 11 July 2015 | BEC Tero Sasana | A | 1–0; Highlight | Napat 81' | 4th |
| 19 July 2015 | Bangkok Glass | A | 2–2; Highlight | Jakkraphan 37' (pen.), Supachai 49' (o.g.) | 4th |
| 22 July 2015 | Chainat Hornbill | H | 1–0; Highlight | Napat 40' | 4th |
| 26 July 2015 | Army United | H | 0–1; Highlight | | 5th |
| 2 August 2015 | Nakhon Ratchasima Mazda | A | 0–1; Highlight | | 5th |
| 8 August 2015 | Gulf Saraburi | H | 0–1; Highlight | | 6th |
| 15 August 2015 | Buriram United | A | 0–1; Highlight | | 7th |
| 19 August 2015 | Port MTI | H | 2–1; Highlight | Jakkraphan 25' (pen.), Napat 69' | 7th |
| 12 September 2015 | Sisaket | A | 5–2; Highlight | van Dijk (2) 1', 50', Chakrit 47', Jakkraphan 55', Carmelo 90+2' | 7th |
| 20 September 2015 | Chiangrai United | H | 3–1; Highlight | Pratum 9', Wattanasap 13', Luís 45+1' | 6th |
| 27 September 2015 | Chonburi | A | 2–2; Highlight | Carmelo 62', Napat 81' | 6th |
| 17 October 2015 | Navy | H | 2–4; Highlight | Seung-hee 25', van Dijk 58' | 7th |
| 25 October 2015 | Bangkok United | A | 3–4; Highlight | Pratum 50', van Dijk 60', Napat 65' | 7th |
| 28 October 2015 | TOT | H | 2–0; Highlight | Pratum 29', van Dijk 34' | 7th |
| 31 October 2015 | Ratchaburi Mitr Phol | A | 2–1; Highlight | Prat 81', van Dijk 90+5' | 5th |
| 15 November 2015 | SCG Muangthong United | A | 2–2; Highlight | van Dijk 83', Chitchanok 87' | 6th |
| 22 November 2015 | BEC Tero Sasana | H | 5–0; Highlight | Prat 25', Pratum 33', Bošković 45' (o.g.), Luís 87', Jakkraphan 90+3' | 4th |
| 28 November 2015 | Chainat Hornbill | A | 2–1; Highlight | van Dijk 61', Pratum 69' | 4th |
| 6 December 2015 | Bangkok Glass | H | 0–0; Highlight | | 5th |
| 9 December 2015 | Army United | A | 3–0; Highlight | Pratum 24', van Dijk 78', Jakkraphan 90' | 3rd |
| 13 December 2015 | Osotspa M-150 Sanut Prakan | H | 2–2; Highlight | Carmelo (2) 28', 47' | 3rd |

== Thai FA Cup ==
Chang FA Cup

| Date | Opponents | H / A | Result F–A | Scorers | Round |
|---|---|---|---|---|---|
| 24 June 2015 | Loei City R Airlines | A | 4–0 | Baworn 30', Luís (3) 65', 79', 90+2' | Round of 64 |
| 29 July 2015 | Army United | A | 0–2; Highlight | | Round of 32 |

== Thai League Cup ==
Toyota League Cup

| Date | Opponents | H / A | Result F–A | Scorers | Round |
|---|---|---|---|---|---|
| 19 April 2015 | Pattani | A | 2–1 (a.e.t.); Highlight | Napat 90+3', B.Jetsada 103' | Round of 64 |
| 1 July 2015 | Phrae United | A | 2–3 (a.e.t.) | Supoj 30', Natthawut 49' | Round of 32 |

== Squad statistics ==
| No. | Pos. | Name | League | | FA Cup | | League Cup | | Total | | Discipline | |
| No. | Pos. | Name | Apps | Goals | Apps | Goals | Apps | Goals | Apps | Goals | Yellow card | Red card |
|---|---|---|---|---|---|---|---|---|---|---|---|---|
| 1 | GK | (Thailand) Pattanan Pijittham | 12(1) | 0 | 1 | 0 | 2 | 0 | 15(1) | 0 | 0 | 0 |
| 2 | DF | (Thailand) Polawat Wangkahart | 24 | 0 | 0 | 0 | 0 | 0 | 24 | 0 | 6 | 0 |
| 3 | DF | (Thailand) Pratum Chuthong | 20(1) | 6 | 1(1) | 0 | 1 | 0 | 22(2) | 6 | 2 | 0 |
| 4 | DF | (Thailand) Natthaphong Samana | 32 | 0 | 2 | 0 | 0 | 0 | 34 | 0 | 6 | 0 |
| 5 | DF | (Thailand) Prat Samakrat (c) | 25 | 2 | 1 | 0 | 0 | 0 | 26 | 2 | 4 | 0 |
| 6 | DF | (Brazil) Márcio Rosário | 29 | 1 | 2 | 0 | 0 | 0 | 31 | 1 | 7 | 0 |
| 7 | MF | (Thailand) Jakkraphan Pornsai | 33 | 13 | 2 | 0 | 0 | 0 | 35 | 13 | 3 | 0 |
| 8 | FW | (Indonesia) Sergio van Dijk | 20(6) | 14 | 1 | 0 | 0 | 0 | 21(6) | 14 | 4 | 0 |
| 9 | FW | (Brazil) André Luís Leite | 20(12) | 6 | 1(1) | 3 | 0 | 0 | 21(13) | 9 | 5 | 0 |
| 10 | MF | (Thailand) Charyl Chappuis | 0 | 0 | 0 | 0 | 0 | 0 | 0 | 0 | 0 | 0 |
| 11 | MF | (Thailand) Jetsada Phulek | 6(7) | 1 | 0 | 0 | 1 | 0 | 7(7) | 1 | 0 | 0 |
| 13 | MF | (South Korea) Lee Seung-hee | 27(3) | 1 | 2 | 0 | 0 | 0 | 29(3) | 1 | 8 | 0 |
| 15 | MF | (Thailand) Kriangkrai Pimrat | 1 | 0 | 0 | 0 | 0 | 0 | 1 | 0 | 0 | 0 |
| 16 | FW | (Thailand) Attapon Kannoo | 0(1) | 0 | 0 | 0 | 0 | 0 | 0(1) | 0 | 0 | 0 |
| 17 | FW | (Spain) Carmelo González | 16(3) | 5 | 0 | 0 | 0 | 0 | 16(3) | 5 | 4 | 0 |
| 18 | MF | (Thailand) Sumanya Purisai | 6(1) | 0 | 0 | 0 | 0 | 0 | 6(1) | 0 | 4 | 0 |
| 19 | FW | (Thailand) Chitchanok Xaysensourinthone | 0(4) | 1 | 0 | 0 | 0 | 0 | 0(4) | 1 | 1 | 0 |
| 20 | GK | (Thailand) Anurak Chompoopruk | 21 | 0 | 1 | 0 | 0 | 0 | 22 | 0 | 2 | 0 |
| 21 | MF | (Thailand) Wattanasap Jarernsri | 12(9) | 1 | 1 | 0 | 2 | 0 | 15(9) | 1 | 5 | 1 |
| 22 | DF | (Thailand) Sakolwat Skollah | 1 | 0 | 0 | 0 | 2 | 0 | 3 | 0 | 0 | 0 |
| 23 | MF | (Thailand) Chakrit Buathong | 4(7) | 1 | 0(1) | 0 | 0 | 0 | 4(8) | 1 | 1 | 0 |
| 24 | FW | (Thailand) Thossaphol Yodchan | 7(5) | 0 | 0 | 0 | 2 | 0 | 9(5) | 0 | 3 | 0 |
| 25 | MF | (Thailand) Chinnawat Tawitsang | 0 | 0 | 0 | 0 | 0 | 0 | 0 | 0 | 0 | 0 |
| 26 | GK | (Thailand) Boonyakiat Wongsajam | 1 | 0 | 0 | 0 | 0 | 0 | 1 | 0 | 0 | 0 |
| 28 | FW | (Thailand) Napat Thamrongsupakorn | 6(9) | 5 | 2 | 0 | 2 | 1 | 10(9) | 6 | 0 | 0 |
| 29 | MF | (Thailand) Natthawut Singharaj | 0(3) | 0 | 0 | 0 | 2 | 1 | 2(3) | 1 | 0 | 0 |
| 30 | DF | (Thailand) Supoj Wonghoi | 20(5) | 0 | 2 | 0 | 1 | 1 | 23(5) | 1 | 5 | 0 |
| 31 | DF | (Thailand) Banlue Thongkleng | 0(4) | 0 | 0 | 0 | 2 | 0 | 2(4) | 0 | 0 | 0 |
| 32 | MF | (Thailand) Ekkalak Thongmak | 0 | 0 | 0 | 0 | 0 | 0 | 0 | 0 | 0 | 0 |
| 33 | MF | (Thailand) Jetsada Boonruangrod (vc) | 11(5) | 0 | 0 | 0 | 0(1) | 1 | 11(6) | 1 | 1 | 0 |
| 34 | DF | (Thailand) Apisit Kamwang | 2(4) | 1 | 0 | 0 | 2 | 0 | 4(4) | 1 | 0 | 0 |
| 38 | MF | (Thailand) Baworn Tapla | 0(5) | 0 | 1(1) | 1 | 1 | 0 | 2(6) | 1 | 0 | 0 |
| 39 | MF | (Thailand) Decha Sa-ardchom | 18(4) | 0 | 2 | 0 | 0 | 0 | 20(4) | 0 | 7 | 1 |
| — | MF | (Thailand) Ekkachai Rittipan | 0(1) | 0 | 0 | 0 | 1 | 0 | 1(1) | 0 | 0 | 0 |
| — | DF | (Thailand) Piyarat Lajungreed | 0 | 0 | 0 | 0 | 1 | 0 | 1 | 0 | 0 | 0 |
| — | — | Own goals | – | 0 | – | 0 | – | 0 | – | 0 | – | – |

== Transfers ==
First Thai footballer's market is opening on 6 November 2014 to 28 January 2015

Second Thai footballer's market is opening on 3 June 2015 to 30 June 2015

=== In ===
| Date | Pos. | Name | From |
|---|---|---|---|
| 31 December 2014 | MF | (Thailand) Charyl Chappuis | (Thailand) Buriram United |
| 31 December 2014 | FW | (Spain) Carmelo González | (Thailand) Buriram United |
| 31 December 2014 | DF | (Thailand) Pratum Chuthong | (Thailand) Buriram United |
| 31 December 2014 | FW | (Thailand) Thossaphol Yodchan | (Thailand) Air Force Central |
| 31 December 2014 | DF | (Thailand) Natthaphong Samana | (Thailand) Chonburi |
| 31 December 2014 | GK | (Thailand) Panupong Pijittham | (Thailand) Chonburi |
| 31 December 2014 | GK | (Thailand) Boonyakiat Wongsajam | (Thailand) Army United |
| 31 December 2014 | DF | (Thailand) Supoj Wonghoi | (Thailand) Army United |
| 31 December 2014 | MF | (Thailand) Wattanasap Jarernsri | (Thailand) BBCU |
| 31 December 2014 | FW | (Brazil) André Luís Leite | (Brazil) Boavista |
| 31 December 2014 | FW | (Thailand) Attapon Kannoo | (Thailand) Chamchuri United |
| 31 December 2014 | MF | (South Korea) Lee Seung-hee | (South Korea) Jeonnam Dragons |
| 31 December 2014 | DF | (Thailand) Banlue Thongkleng | (Thailand) SCG Muangthong United |
| 31 December 2014 | MF | (Thailand) Baworn Tapla | (Thailand) Chonburi |
| 28 July 2014 | MF | (Thailand) Chakrit Buathong | (Thailand) Chonburi |
| 28 July 2014 | FW | (Thailand) Chitchanok Xaysensourinthone | (Thailand) BEC Tero Sasana |

=== Out ===
| Date | Pos. | Name | To |
|---|---|---|---|
| 28 January 2015 | GK | (Thailand) Kittipong Phuthawchueak | (Thailand) Bangkok United |
| 28 January 2015 | MF | (Thailand) Pichit Jaibun | (Thailand) Chainat |
| 28 January 2015 | DF | (Thailand) Thanakorn Kamkhoma | (Thailand) Chainat |
| 28 January 2015 | FW | (Ivory Coast) Bireme Diouf | (Thailand) Gulf Saraburi |
| 28 January 2015 | MF | (Germany) Björn Lindemann | (Thailand) Nakhon Ratchasima Mazda |
| 28 January 2015 | MF | (Thailand) Sutee Suksomkit | (Thailand) TTM |
| 28 January 2015 | DF | (Thailand) Putthinan Wannasri | (Thailand) Bangkok United |
| 28 January 2015 | DF | (Thailand) Panupong Wongsa | (Thailand) Bangkok United |
| 28 January 2015 | MF | (South Korea) Jung Myung-oh | Released |
| 28 January 2015 | MF | (Montenegro) Dragan Bošković | (Thailand) Bangkok United |
| 28 January 2015 | FW | (Japan) Robert Cullen | (South Korea) Seoul E-Land |
| 28 January 2015 | FW | (Thailand) Wuttichai Asusheewa | (Thailand) Prachuap |

=== Loan in ===
| Date from | Date to | Pos. | Name | From |
|---|---|---|---|---|
| 28 July 2015 | 31 December 2015 | MF | (Thailand) Sumanya Purisai | (Thailand) Bangkok United |

=== Loan out ===
| Date from | Date to | Pos. | Name | From |
|---|---|---|---|---|
| 28 January 2015 | 3 April 2015 | MF | (Thailand) Ekkachai Rittipan | (Thailand) Army United |
| 28 July 2015 | 31 December 2015 | MF | (Thailand) Ekkachai Rittipan | (Thailand) BEC Tero Sasana |
| 28 July 2015 | 31 December 2015 | DF | (Thailand) Sakolwat Skollah | (Thailand) TOT |
| 28 July 2015 | 31 December 2015 | DF | (Thailand) Piyarat Lajungreed | (Thailand) Bangkok United |
