= 2017 J.League Asia Challenge =

2017 Ｊリーグ アジアチャレンジ (in Japanese) เจลีก เอเชีย ชาเลนจ์ 2017 (in Thai)

Tournament details
- Host country: Thailand
- Dates: 24–26 January 2017
- Teams: 4 (from 1 confederation)
- Venue: 1 (in 1 host city)

The 2017 J.League Asia Challenge was a series of friendly association football tournaments that began on 24 January and ended on 26 January. It was organized by the Japan Professional Football League. The tournament is set to be a in round-robin tournament format with all matches being held at the Rajamangala Stadium in Bangkok, Thailand on 24 and 26 January.

In December 2016, Japanese teams, Kashima Antlers and Yokohama F. Marinos were confirmed to play in this tournament with Thai teams, Bangkok United and Suphanburi.

== Teams ==
Location of teams of the 2017 J.League Asia Challenge.

Nation	Team	Location	Confederation	Sub-Confederation	League
Japan	Kashima Antlers	Kashima	AFC	EAFF	J-League
Japan	Yokohama F. Marinos	Yokohama	AFC	EAFF	J-League
Thailand	Bangkok United	Pathum Thani	AFC	AFF	Thai League 1
Thailand	Suphanburi	Suphan Buri	AFC	AFF	Thai League 1

== Venues ==
All matches held at the Rajamangala Stadium in Bangkok, Thailand

Bangkok
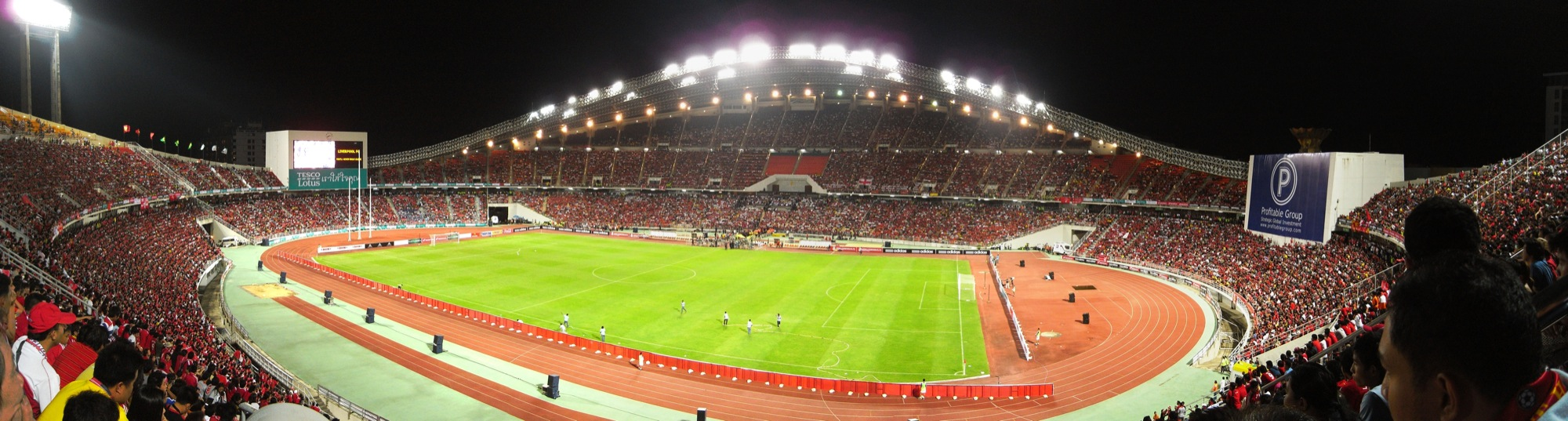
Rajamangala Stadium
Capacity: 49,772

== Squads ==
(Japan) Kashima Antlers
Manager: (Japan) Masatada Ishii

Note: Flags indicate national team as defined under FIFA eligibility rules; some limited exceptions apply. Players may hold more than one non-FIFA nationality.

No.	Pos.	Nation	Player
1	GK	JPN	Masatoshi Kushibiki
3	DF	JPN	Gen Shoji
6	MF	JPN	Ryota Nagaki
8	MF	JPN	Shoma Doi
10	MF	JPN	Gaku Shibasaki
11	MF	BRA	Fabrício
13	MF	JPN	Atsutaka Nakamura
14	DF	KOR	Hwang Seok-ho
16	DF	JPN	Shuto Yamamoto
17	DF	BRA	Bueno
18	FW	JPN	Shuhei Akasaki
20	MF	JPN	Kento Misao
21	GK	JPN	Hitoshi Sogahata
22	DF	JPN	Daigo Nishi
23	DF	JPN	Naomichi Ueda
24	DF	JPN	Yukitoshi Ito
25	MF	JPN	Yasushi Endo
29	GK	JPN	Shinichiro Kawamata
32	MF	JPN	Taro Sugimoto
33	MF	JPN	Mu Kanazaki
34	FW	JPN	Yuma Suzuki
35	MF	JPN	Taiki Hirato
40	MF	JPN	Mitsuo Ogasawara

(Japan) Yokohama F. Marinos
Manager: (France) Erick Mombaerts

Note: Flags indicate national team as defined under FIFA eligibility rules; some limited exceptions apply. Players may hold more than one non-FIFA nationality.

No.	Pos.	Nation	Player
1	GK	JPN	Tetsuya Enomoto
2	DF	KOR	Park Jeong-su
4	DF	JPN	Yuzo Kurihara
5	DF	BRA	Fábio Aguiar
6	MF	JPN	Yuta Mikado
7	MF	JPN	Shingō Hyōdō
8	MF	JPN	Kosuke Nakamachi
9	FW	BRA	Kayke
10	FW	JPN	Shunsuke Nakamura (Captain)
11	FW	JPN	Manabu Saito
14	FW	JPN	Masashi Wada
15	DF	JPN	Ikki Arai
16	FW	JPN	Sho Ito
17	FW	JPN	Cayman Togashi
18	MF	JPN	Keita Endo
19	FW	JPN	Teruhito Nakagawa
20	FW	CUW	Quenten Martinus
21	GK	JPN	Hiroki Iikura
22	DF	JPN	Yuji Nakazawa
23	DF	JPN	Takumi Shimohira
24	DF	JPN	Takashi Kanai
25	MF	JPN	Naoki Maeda
26	MF	JPN	Kensei Nakashima
28	MF	JPN	Takuya Kida
29	MF	JPN	Jun Amano
30	GK	JPN	Junto Taguchi
31	GK	JPN	Takuya Takahashi
—	DF	JPN	Ken Matsubara
—	DF	JPN	Ryosuke Yamanaka

(Thailand) Bangkok United
Manager: (Brazil) Sérgio Farias

Note: Flags indicate national team as defined under FIFA eligibility rules; some limited exceptions apply. Players may hold more than one non-FIFA nationality.

No.	Pos.	Nation	Player
1	GK	THA	Pattanan Pijittham
2	DF	THA	Wasan Homsan
4	DF	THA	Natthaphong Samana
7	FW	THA	Chananan Pombuppha
9	FW	BRA	Dellatorre
10	MF	THA	Charyl Chappuis (3rd-captain)
11	MF	THA	Thanasit Siriphala
14	MF	THA	Paitoon Nontadee
15	MF	THA	Suban Ngernprasert
16	MF	THA	Rattana Petch-Aporn
17	MF	THA	Rangsan Viwatchaichok (Captain)
18	GK	THA	Sinthaweechai Hathairattanakool (Vice-captain)
19	FW	THA	Chitchanok Xaysensourinthone
23	MF	THA	Chakrit Buathong
24	FW	THA	Thossaphol Yodchan
25	DF	THA	Tinnakorn Asurin
28	FW	THA	Napat Thamrongsupakorn
30	DF	THA	Supoj Wonghoi
35	GK	THA	Adisak Bunthawi
38	DF	THA	Apisit Kamwang
-	MF	THA	Adul Lahsoh
-	MF	CRC	Diego Madrigal
-	FW	ARG	Nicolás Vélez
—	DF	THA	Prathan Mansiri
—	GK	THA	Pathomtat Sudprasert

== Fixtures and results ==
All times are Thailand Standard Time (UTC+7).

Team	Pld	W	D	L	GF	GA	GD	Pts
(Japan) Yokohama F. Marinos	2	2	0	0	7	2	+5	6
(Japan) Kashima Antlers	2	1	0	1	7	6	+1	3
(Thailand) Bangkok United	2	1	0	1	6	6	0	3
(Thailand) Suphanburi	2	0	0	2	2	8	−6	0

=== Match Day 1 ===
24 January 2017
16:00 ICT

Suphanburi (Thailand)	2 - 4	(Japan) Kashima Antlers
Dellatorre 12', 39'	Report	Yuma Suzuki 26', 62' Pedro Júnior 59', 69'

Rajamangala Stadium, Bangkok
Attendance: 2,351
Referee: Gu Chunhan (China)

24 January 2017
19:00 ICT

Bangkok United (Thailand)	2 - 3	(Japan) Yokohama F. Marinos
Sumanya Purisai 51' Teeratep Winothai 86'	Report	Cayman Togashi 20'; Kensei Nakashima 62'; Teruhito Nakagawa 83'

Rajamangala Stadium, Bangkok
Attendance: 3,542

=== Match Day 2 ===
26 January 2017
16:00 ICT

Bangkok United (Thailand)	4 - 3	(Japan) Kashima Antlers
Dragan Bošković 10', 26', 37'; Own goal 36'	Report	Mu Kanazaki 42'; Leandro 49'; Léo Silva 90'

Rajamangala Stadium, Bangkok
Attendance: 1,200

26 January 2017
19:00 ICT

Suphanburi (Thailand)	0 - 4	(Japan) Yokohama F. Marinos
	Report	Keita Endo 47', 52'; Cayman Togashi 89'; Kota Yamada 90+3'

Rajamangala Stadium, Bangkok
Attendance: 4,379

== Media coverage ==
- (Thailand) True Sport, True 4U
