= 2016 Chainat Hornbill F.C. season =

Chainat Hornbill
2016 season
- Chairman: Anucha Nakasai
- Manager: Koichi Sugiyama
- Stadium: Khao Plong Stadium
- Thai League: 17th
- Thai FA Cup: Winners
- Thai League Cup: First Round
- Top goalscorer: Sho Shimoji (9)
| Home colours | Away colours |

The 2016 season is Chainat Hornbill's 5th season in the Thai Premier League since 2012.

The club placed 17th in the league standings and was relegated.

== Players ==
=== First team squad ===
Note: Flags indicate national team as defined under FIFA eligibility rules; some limited exceptions apply. Players may hold more than one non-FIFA nationality.

| No. | Pos. | Nation | Player |
|---|---|---|---|
| 1 | GK | THA | Pisan Dorkmaikaew (on loan from Bangkok United) |
| 2 | DF | THA | Parinya Utapao |
| 3 | DF | THA | Yordrak Namuangrak |
| 4 | DF | THA | Somphop Nilwong |
| 5 | DF | THA | Panuwat Failai |
| 6 | DF | THA | Chairat Kritsananumpok |
| 7 | DF | THA | Surachet Ngamtip |
| 8 | MF | JPN | Sho Shimoji |
| 9 | FW | BRA | Reis |
| 10 | FW | FRA | Florent Pongolle |
| 11 | MF | THA | Jakkit Wechpirom (on loan from Bangkok United) |
| 13 | FW | THA | Tanat Chantaya |
| 14 | MF | THA | Laksana Kamruen |
| 15 | MF | THA | Chatchai Koompraya (on loan from Bangkok United) |
| 16 | FW | THA | Narutchai Nimboon |
| 17 | MF | THA | Chotinan Theerapatpong |
| 18 | MF | THA | Assaming Mae |
| 19 | DF | THA | Jeera Jarernsuk |

| No. | Pos. | Nation | Player |
|---|---|---|---|
| 20 | FW | THA | Wasin Limkiatsathaporn |
| 21 | MF | JPN | Kazuto Kushida |
| 22 | DF | THA | Thanakorn Kamkhoma |
| 23 | MF | THA | Jirawat Chingchaiyaphum |
| 24 | MF | THA | Natchanon Songduang |
| 26 | GK | THA | Nattapong Khajohnmalee |
| 28 | MF | THA | Pichit Jaibun |
| 29 | FW | THA | Arthit Butjinda (on loan from Buriram United) |
| 31 | MF | THA | Anuwat Noicheunphan (on loan from Army United) |
| 32 | MF | THA | Ratchapol Nawanno |
| 33 | FW | THA | Somjed Sattabut (Captain) |
| 34 | DF | THA | Pairote Sokam |
| 35 | DF | KOR | Jo Tae-keun |
| 36 | MF | THA | Narongchai Vachiraban |
| 37 | GK | THA | Surasak Thong-aon |
| 39 | DF | THA | Sorasak Kaewinta |
| 40 | MF | THA | Adisak Klinkosoom |

==== Out on loan ====
Note: Flags indicate national team as defined under FIFA eligibility rules; some limited exceptions apply. Players may hold more than one non-FIFA nationality.

| No. | Pos. | Nation | Player |
|---|---|---|---|
| — | DF | THA | Tripop Somwang (at Loei City) |
| — | DF | THA | Akkarachai Sematangcharoen (at Dome) |

| No. | Pos. | Nation | Player |
|---|---|---|---|
| — | FW | TRI | Seon Power (at Dome) |

== Thai Premier League ==
Toyota Thai Premier League

| Date | Opponents | H / A | Result F–A | Scorers | League position |
|---|---|---|---|---|---|
| 5 March 2016 | Navy | A | 0–0 | | 9th |
| 9 March 2016 | Nakhon Ratchasima Mazda | H | 3–1 | Jitpanya 7' , Adisak 51' , Renan 90+3' | 4th |
| 13 March 2016 | Sisaket | A | 1–2 | Surachet 51' | 7th |
| 16 March 2016 | Bangkok Glass | H | 2–3 | Shimoji 61' , Jitpanya 85' | 12th |
| 30 March 2016 | Chonburi | H | 1–4 | Jitpanya 55' | 15th |
| 3 April 2016 | Chiangrai United | A | 0–1 | | 15th |
| 23 April 2016 | Bangkok United | H | 1–2 | Shimoji 49' | 16th |
| 27 April 2016 | Suphanburi | A | 0–1 | | 17th |
| 1 May 2016 | Pattaya United | H | 1–3 | Narutchai 85' | 17th |
| 8 May 2016 | Buriram United | A | 0–0 | | 17th |
| 11 May 2016 | BBCU | H | 3–1 | Alex 56' 63' (pen.), Renan 79' | 15th |
| 14 May 2016 | Sukhothai | A | 1–2 | Alex 68' | 15th |
| 21 May 2016 | Osotspa M-150 Samut Prakan | H | 1–3 | Shimoji 53' | 16th |
| 28 May 2016 | Army United | H | | | |
| 12 June 2016 | SCG Muangthong United | A | | | |

== Thai League Cup ==
Toyota League Cup

| Date | Opponents | H / A | Result F–A | Scorers | Round |
|---|---|---|---|---|---|
| 9 April 2016 | Lamphun Warrior | A | 0–1 | | Round of 64 |
