= 2016 Thai FA Cup =

Tournament details
- Country: Thailand
- Dates: 18 May 2016 – 15 October 2016
- Teams: 72

Final positions
- Champions: Chainat Hornbill; Chonburi; Ratchaburi Mitr Phol; Sukhothai (title shared)

The Chang FA Cup 2016 (Thai: ช้าง เอฟเอคัพ) is the 23rd season of Thailand knockout football competition. The tournament is organized by the Football Association of Thailand.

Following the death of King Bhumibol Adulyadej, the Football Association of Thailand cancelled the remaining league and cup season on 14 October 2016, stating that the FA Cup winners would be determined by a lottery draw. This was at the semi-final stage of the competition and would determine who would represent Thailand in Asian competition.

The following day however (15 October), FAT appeared to do a U-turn and announced that further discussions with key stake holders would determine whether the league campaign would continue. These discussions were required as teams that were in the relegation places at the time of the original announcement were voicing their concerns.

After the discussions, FAT decided that the four semi-finalists were awarded 2016 Thai FA Cup co-winners. A draw was held among them to select the team that will participate in 2017 AFC Champions League Play-off and was won by Sukhothai, while Chonburi withdrew from the draw.

== Calendar ==
Round	Date	Matches	Clubs	New entries this round
Qualification Round	18 May 2016	8	5 + 10 + 1 → 8	(5 2016 Thai Division 1 League; 10 Regional League Division 2 and 1 Other CUP)
First Round	15 June 2016	32	8 + 2 + 26 + 10 + 18 → 32	(18 2016 Thai Premier League; 10 2016 Thai Division 1 League; 26 Regional League Division 2 and 2 Other CUP)
Second Round	13 July 2016	16	32 → 16	
Third Round	3 August 2016	8	16 → 8	
Quarter-finals Round	21 September 2016	4	8 → 4	
Semi-finals Round	2 November 2016	2	4 → 2	
Final	5 November 2016	1	2 → 1	
Total				72 clubs

== Results ==
=== Qualification round ===
Qualification round for teams currently playing in the 2016 Thai Division 1 League, Regional League Division 2 and Other CUP level. The Qualification round was held 18 May 2016.

18 May 2016	Bang Phlap	0–5	Samut Sakhon	Nonthaburi
15:30 (UTC+7)		report	thanapol dumngam Anusorn Srichaluang	Stadium: Bang Phlap academy stadium

18 May 2016	Yasothon	0–1	Samut Songkhram	Yasothon
15:30 (UTC+7)		report	Kadiri Sulley 88'	Stadium: Suan Phayathan Stadium

18 May 2016	Royal Thai Fleet	0–4	Banbueng United	Chonburi
15:30 (UTC+7)		report	Thanesh Benpad 56', 67'; Kittisak Sungnoen 80'; Chatchai Nunthavichiarith 82'	Stadium: Sattahip Navy Stadium

18 May 2016	Uttaradit	1–2	Nong Bua Pitchaya	Uttaradit
16:30 (UTC+7)	No Hyung-chol 45' (pen.)	report	Bunluesak Yodyingyong 12'; Peerapat Pongsen 52'	Stadium: Mon-mai Stadium

18 May 2016	BTU United	1–2	Ubon UMT United	Bangkok
18:00 (UTC+7)	Heritiana Thierry Ratsimbazafy 72'	report	Alex Rafael 15'; Piyapong Homkhajohn 28'	Stadium: Bangkokthonburi University Stadium

18 May 2016	Air Force Central	0–0 (4–5 p)	Pathum Thani United	Pathum Thani
18:00 (UTC+7)		report		Stadium: Thupatemee Stadium

18 May 2016	Nakhon Pathom United	2–1	Rangsit	Nakhon Pathom
18:00 (UTC+7)	Chayakon Martsongkhram 25'; Panuwat Yimsa-ngar 51'	report	Opeyemi Ajayi 62'	Stadium: Nakhon Pathom Municipality Sport School Stadium

18 May 2016	PTT Rayong	4–0	Ayutthaya United	Rayong
18:00 (UTC+7)	Anuwat Nakkasem 17' (pen.); Amadou Ouattara 62', 75'; Phanuwat Jinta 76'	report		Stadium: PTT Stadium

=== First round ===
First round for teams currently playing in the 2016 Thai Premier League, 2016 Thai Division 1 League, Regional League Division 2 and Other CUP level. The first round was held 15 June 2016.

15 June 2016	Banbueng United	w/o	Phuket	Chonburi
15:30 (UTC+7)		report		Stadium: Banbueng Artificial turf football field

15 June 2016	TA Benchamarachuthit	0–6	Suphanburi	Chanthaburi
15:30 (UTC+7)		report	Napat Thamrongsupakorn 2', 10', 78'; Tinnakorn Asurin 20'; Chitchanok Xaysensourinthone 82'; Dellatorre 84'	Stadium: Rambhai Barni Rajabhat University Stadium

15 June 2016	Phan Thong	0–2	Nara United	Chonburi
15:30 (UTC+7)		report	Ibrahim Dicko 67' (pen.)	Stadium: IPE Chonburi Stadium

15 June 2016	Krung Thonburi	1–1 (8–7 p)	Sa Kaeo	Nakhon Pathom
15:30 (UTC+7)	Marc Jaksuvijittrakorn 100'	report	Tungsit Soimi 120+1'	Stadium: Mahidol University Salaya Campus Stadium

15 June 2016	Loei City	1–3	Army United	Loei
15:30 (UTC+7)	Jakkrit Khemnak	report	Thossawat Limwannasathian; Thammarat Wanmanee; Sanukran Thinjom	Stadium: Loei Riverside Stadium

15 June 2016	Simork	1–0	PTU Pathum Thani	Suphanburi
15:30 (UTC+7)	Thanawat Suklert 7'	report		Stadium: Suphanburi Sports School Stadium

15 June 2016	Nong Bua Pitchaya	4–2 (a.e.t.)	Assumption United	Nong Bua Lam Phu
17:00 (UTC+7)	Raúl González Gastón 47', 89'; Tatree Sing-Ha 103'; Weerayut Srivichai 119'	report	Yotsak Chaowana 72'; Saran Puangbut 76'	Stadium: Nong Bua Lamphu Province Stadium

15 June 2016	Kasem Bundit University	0–4	Super Power Samut Prakan	Bangkok
18:00 (UTC+7)		report	Wanmai Sethtanan 13'; Ahn Jae-hoon 49'; Antonio Verzura 74', 78'	Stadium: Kasem Bundit University Stadium

15 June 2016	Nonthaburi	0–0 (6–5 p)	Ang Thong	Nonthaburi
15:30 (UTC+7)		report		Stadium: Nonthaburi Sport Complex Stadium

15 June 2016	Khonkaen	1–1 (4–5 p)	Sisaket	Khon Kaen
19:00 (UTC+7)	Anurak Wongnari 49'	report	Yuttana Ruangsuksut 72'	Stadium: Khon Kaen Stadium

15 June 2016	Muangkan United	2–3	Khon Kaen United	Kanchanaburi
18:00 (UTC+7)	Withun Sukjit 90'; Enoch Ozor 90+3'	report	Issarapong Lilakorn 24', 77'; Apinat Songsri 90+1'	Stadium: Kleab Bua Stadium

15 June 2016	Samut Sakhon	2–0	Surin City	Samut Sakhon
18:00 (UTC+7)	Aliou Seck; Kone Adama	report		Stadium: Samut Sakhon Province Stadium

15 June 2016	Samut Songkhram	1–3	Chainat Hornbill	Samut Songkhram
18:00 (UTC+7)	Rattaporn Saetan 63'	report	Arthit Butjinda 2', 11'; Renan Silva 73'	Stadium: Samut Songkhram Stadium

15 June 2016	Chanthaburi	6–2	Sing Ubon	Chanthaburi
18:00 (UTC+7)	Kammarat Khamphan; Abhisit Phondonkor; Padipat Amatantree ..'; Mongkol Khamdod; Adisak Yupun	report		Stadium: Chanthaburi Province Stadium

15 June 2016	Singburi Bang Rachan	0–2	Chonburi	Singburi
18:00 (UTC+7)		report	Leandro Assumpção 59'; Nurul Sriyankem 87'	Stadium: Singburi Province Stadium

15 June 2016	Krabi	0–0 (5–4 p)	Raj Pracha	Krabi
18:00 (UTC+7)		report		Stadium: Krabi Provincial Stadium

15 June 2016	Songkhla United	2–1	Phattalung	Songkhla
18:00 (UTC+7)	Yugo Kobayashi 20' (pen.); Willen 80'	report	Beng Abel Marcel 67'	Stadium: Nathawee Municipality Stadium

15 June 2016	Ubon UMT United	0–0 (4–2 p)	Pluak Daeng Rayong United	Ubon Ratchathani
18:00 (UTC+7)		report		Stadium: Tung Burapha Stadium

15 June 2016	Chiangrai United	6–1	BBCU	Chiang Rai
18:00 (UTC+7)	Piyaphon Phanichakul 6'; Wellington 22', 36', 55' (pen.); Hironori Saruta 34'; Nantawat Tansopa 66'	report	Marakami Kazuki 62'	Stadium: United Stadium

15 June 2016	Buriram United	8–0	Vongchavalitkul University	Buriram
18:00 (UTC+7)	Kaio 8', 23'; Andrés Túñez 20', 58'; Diogo 30', 51', 65'; Anawin Jujeen 59'	report		Stadium: New I-Mobile Stadium

15 June 2016	Chiangmai	1–1 (5–4 p)	Pathum Thani United	Chiang Mai
19:00 (UTC+7)	Sarun Promkaew 79'	report	Panupong Hawan 56'	Stadium: 700th Anniversary Stadium

15 June 2016	Trat	2–0	Nakhon Pathom United	Trat
18:00 (UTC+7)	Jirawut Saranan; Woukoue Reymond	report		Stadium: Trat Province Stadium

15 June 2016	Prachuap	4–1	Bangkok	Prachuap Khiri Khan
18:00 (UTC+7)	Uroš Stojanov 47'; Hristijan Kirovski 52', 82'; Nascimento 90+2'	report	Aiyares Chuensri 49'	Stadium: Sam Ao Stadium

15 June 2016	Cha Choeng Sao	1–3	Sukhothai	Chachoengsao
18:30 (UTC+7)	Sarawut Choenchai 85'	report	Yod Chanthawong 3', 20'; Pornpreecha Jarunai 87'	Stadium: Chachoengsao Town municipality Stadium

15 June 2016	Rayong	2–1	Samut Prakan	Rayong
19:00 (UTC+7)	Jakkapong Poonjuang 39'; Netipong Nga-juean 45'	report	Pornchai Poonphol 78'	Stadium: Rayong Stadium

15 June 2016	Ratchaburi Mitr Phol	1–0	Kasetsart University	Ratchaburi
19:00 (UTC+7)		report	Phuminiwat Thuha 74' (o.g.)	Stadium: Ratchaburi Stadium

15 June 2016	Navy	1–3	Port	Chonburi
19:00 (UTC+7)	Addison 73'	report	Maranhão 2'; Ekkapoom Potharungroj 42', 45'	Stadium: Sattahip Navy Stadium

15 June 2016	Ayutthaya Warrior	1–4 (a.e.t.)	SCG Muangthong United	Ayutthaya
19:00 (UTC+7)	Kim Ji-hun 36'	report	Sornnarai Chamrurai 79' (o.g.), 105' (o.g.); Kuekkong Pongsatit 112' (o.g.); Teerasil Dangda 119'	Stadium: Ayutthaya Province Stadium

15 June 2016	Thai Honda Ladkrabang	1–2	Pattaya United	Bangkok
19:00 (UTC+7)	Poramat Krongborisoot 12'	report	Júnior Negrão 50'; Soony Saad 56'	Stadium: 72nd Anniversary Stadium

15 June 2016	Bangkok United	3–3 (4–5 p)	Nakhon Ratchasima	Pathumthani
19:00 (UTC+7)	Teeratep Winothai 12', 60'; Sasalak Haiprakhon 31'	report	Athibordee Atirat 33'; Promphong Kransumrong 37', 57'	Stadium: Thammasat Stadium

15 June 2016	Bangkok Glass	6–0	Bangkok Christian College	Thanyaburi
19:00 (UTC+7)	Tassanapong Muaddarak 16'; Warut Boonsuk 26'; Pakin Kaikaew 45+1'; Surachat Sareepim 62', 87'; Ongart Pamonprasert 67'	report		Stadium: Leo Stadium

15 June 2016	BEC Tero Sasana	3–2	PTT Rayong	Bangkok
19:00 (UTC+7)	Sivakorn Tiatrakul 71', 77'; Sarawut Kanlayanabandit 88'	report	Weerawut Kayem 66'; Surawich Logarwit 79'	Stadium: 72-years Anniversary Stadium

=== Second round ===
13 July 2016	Simork	0–2	Rayong	Suphanburi
15:30 (UTC+7)		report	Sirisak Fufung 59', 63'	Stadium: Suphanburi Sports School Stadium

13 July 2016	Prachuap	4–1	Trat	Prachuap Khiri Khan
18:00 (UTC+7)	Uroš Stojanov 20', 82'; Wanit Chaisan 54'; Kwon Dae-hee 86'	report	Yoon Si-ho 30'	Stadium: Sam Ao Stadium

13 July 2016	Chanthaburi	0–5	Buriram United	Chanthaburi
18:00 (UTC+7)		report	Bruno Moreira 26'; Kaio 29' (pen.); Diogo 51'; Anon Amornlerdsak 89'; Chitipat Tanklang 90+2'	Stadium: Chanthaburi Province Stadium

13 July 2016	Suphanburi	3–0	Krung Thonburi	Suphanburi
18:00 (UTC+7)	Dellatorre 25'; Natthaphong Samana 50'; Darko Tasevski 80'	report		Stadium: Suphanburi Municipality Stadium

13 July 2016	Ubon UMT United	0–2	Ratchaburi Mitr Phol	Ubon Ratchathani
18:00 (UTC+7)	report		Germán Pacheco 23'; Carlos 57'	Stadium: Tung Burapha Stadium

13 July 2016	Sukhothai	2–0 (a.e.t.)	Super Power Samut Prakan	Sukhothai
18:00 (UTC+7)	Kritsana Kasemkulvilai 94'; Renan Marques 118'	report		Stadium: Thung Thalay Luang Stadium

13 July 2016	Port	1–0	BEC Tero Sasana	Bangkok
18:00 (UTC+7)	Tana Chanabut 81'	report		Stadium: PAT Stadium

13 July 2016	Chiangrai United	2–1	Bangkok Glass	Chiang Rai
18:00 (UTC+7)	Wellington 42'; Mark Bridge 90+6'; Intharat Apinyakool 90+8' (o.g.)	report		Stadium: United Stadium

13 July 2016	Nonthaburi	1–0	Samut Sakhon	Nonthaburi
18:00 (UTC+7)	John Sam 90'	report		Stadium: Nonthaburi Sport Complex Stadium

13 July 2016	Chonburi	4–2	Nong Bua Pitchaya	Chonburi
19:00 (UTC+7)	Anderson 8'; Leandro Assumpção 76', 84'	report	Prachya Hong-In 18' (o.g.); Anon Yangkhum 67'; Weerayut Sriwichai 90'	Stadium: Chonburi Stadium

13 July 2016	Nakhon Ratchasima	2–0	Nara United	Nakhon Ratchasima
19:00 (UTC+7)	Promphong Kransumrong 29', 39'	report		Stadium: 80th Birthday Stadium

13 July 2016	Pattaya United	1–4 (a.e.t.)	SCG Muangthong United	Chonburi
19:00 (UTC+7)		report	Cleiton Silva 55'; Kawin Thamsatchanan 90+5' (o.g.); Teerasil Dangda 103', 114'; Michaël N'dri 111'	Stadium: Nong Prue Stadium

13 July 2016	Chainat Hornbill	3–1	Banbueng United	Chainat
19:00 (UTC+7)	Yordrak Namuangrak 33'; Arthit Butjinda 77', 79'	report	Worachai Surinsirirat 80'	Stadium: Khao Plong Stadium

13 July 2016	Sisaket	3–1	Songkhla United	Sisaket
19:00 (UTC+7)	Phuwadol Suwannachart 30' (pen.), 55'; Suriyakarn Chimjeen 62'	report	Manop Sornkaew 85' (pen.)	Stadium: Sri Nakhon Lamduan Stadium

13 July 2016	Khon Kaen United	3–2	Chiangmai	Khon Kaen
19:00 (UTC+7)	Issarapong Lilakorn 64'; Melvin de Leeuw 80'; Sarayuth Chaikamdee 81'	report	Borja Navarro 51'; Kansit Premthanakul 58'	Stadium: Khonkaen Stadium

13 July 2016	Army United	3–2	Krabi	Bangkok
19:00 (UTC+7)	Josimar 3'; Thossawat Limwannasathian 38' (o.g.); Tanakorn Dangthong 80'; Kanok Kohyangpueak 81'	report	Tangeni Shipahu 78'	Stadium: Royal Thai Army Stadium

=== Third round ===
3 August 2016	Khon Kaen United	2–0	Prachuap	Khon Kaen
15:30 (UTC+7)	Amorn Thammanarm 41'; Gorka Unda 52'	report		Stadium: Khon Kaen school football field

3 August 2016	Port	2–0	Sisaket	Bangkok
18:00 (UTC+7)	Wuttichai Tathong 49'; Piyachart Tamaphan 56'	report		Stadium: PAT Stadium

3 August 2016	Suphanburi	1–0	Chiangrai United	Suphanburi
18:00 (UTC+7)	Thanasit Siriphala 85'	report		Stadium: Suphanburi Municipality Stadium

3 August 2016	SCG Muangthong United	3–1	Buriram United	Nonthaburi
19:00 (UTC+7)	Adisak Kraisorn 26'; Teerasil Dangda 37'; Cleiton Silva 64'	report	Teerasil Dangda 75' (o.g.)	Stadium: SCG Stadium

3 August 2016	Army United	3–4 (a.e.t.)	Sukhothai	Bangkok
19:00 (UTC+7)	Tanakorn Dangthong 52'; Josimar 69'; Rodrigo Frauches 90+3'	report	Bireme Diouf 20'; Renan Marques 50' (pen.); Hiromichi Katano 54'; Kritsana Kasemkulvilai 114'	Stadium: Royal Thai Army Stadium

3 August 2016	Chainat Hornbill	2–1	Nonthaburi	Chainat
19:00 (UTC+7)	Arthit Butjinda 82'	report	Peerachart Yimthong 62' (o.g.); John Sam 68'	Stadium: Khao Plong Stadium

3 August 2016	Rayong	1–4	Chonburi	Rayong
19:00 (UTC+7)	Adam Arsayuth 76'	report	Rodrigo Vergilio 17'; Leandro Assumpção 36', 47'; Pipob On-Mo 79'	Stadium: Rayong Stadium

3 August 2016	Ratchaburi Mitr Phol	2–1 (a.e.t.)	Nakhon Ratchasima	Ratchaburi
19:00 (UTC+7)	Yannick Djaló 77', 94' (pen.)	report	Chakrit Rawanprakone 7'	Stadium: Ratchaburi Stadium

=== Quarter-finals ===
Khon Kaen United was suspended from the 2016 campaign due to criminal case with 8 games remaining

21 September 2016	Sukhothai	4–0	Port	Sukhothai
19:00 (UTC+7)	John Baggio 8'; Bireme Diouf 35', 57'	Report	Narong Wisetsri 39' (o.g.)	Stadium: Thung Thalay Luang Stadium

21 September 2016	Chainat Hornbill	3–2	Suphanburi	Chainat
19:00 (UTC+7)	Laksana Kamruen 16'; Reis 31'; Jeera Jarernsuk 75'	Report	Dellatorre 28' (pen.); Darko Tasevski 45+3'	Stadium: Khao Plong Stadium

21 September 2016	SCG Muangthong United	0–3	Chonburi	Bangkok
19:00 (UTC+7)		Report	Leandro Assumpção 55' (pen.), 56'; Rodrigo Vergilio 87'	Stadium: Rajamangala Stadium

21 September 2016	Ratchaburi Mitr Phol	w/o	Khon Kaen United	Ratchaburi
19:00 (UTC+7)		Report		Stadium: Mitr Phol Stadium

=== Semi-finals ===
Following the death of King Bhumibol Adulyadej, the Football Association of Thailand cancelled the remaining matches and the four semi-finalists were awarded co-winners. A draw was held among them to select the team that will participate in 2017 AFC Champions League Play-off and was won by Sukhothai, while Chonburi withdrew from the draw.

2 November 2016	Ratchaburi Mitr Phol	Cancelled	Sukhothai	Pathum Thani
19:00 (UTC+7)				Stadium: Thammasat Stadium

2 November 2016	Chonburi	Cancelled	Chainat Hornbill	Bangkok
19:00 (UTC+7)				Stadium: Rajamangala Stadium

== See also ==
- 2016 Thai League
- 2016 Thai Division 1 League
- 2016 Regional League Division 2
- 2016 Football Division 3
- 2016 Thai League Cup
- 2016 Kor Royal Cup
