= Suphanburi F.C. Reserves and Academy =

Thai football club

Suphanburi F.C. Reserves and Academy สโมสรฟุตบอลสุพรรณบุรี เอฟซี ทีมสำรองและเยาวชน
- Full name: Suphanburi Football Club สโมสรฟุตบอลสุพรรณบุรี เอฟซี ทีมสำรองและเยาวชน
- Nickname(s): The War Elephants (ช้างศึกยุทธหัตถี)
- Founded: 1997
- Ground: Suphan Buri Provincial Stadium; Suphan Buri, Thailand
- Capacity: 25,709
- Chairman: Varawut Silpa-archa
- Head Coach: Adebayo Gbadebo
- League: Thai Premier League Reserves and Academy
Home colours	Away colours

Suphanburi Football Club Reserves and Academy (Thai: สโมสรฟุตบอลสุพรรณบุรี เอฟซี ทีมสำรองและเยาวชน) are the Reserve team of Suphanburi F.C. They play in the Thai Premier League Reserves and Academy.
