= Jakkapan Pornsai =

Thai footballer (born 1987)

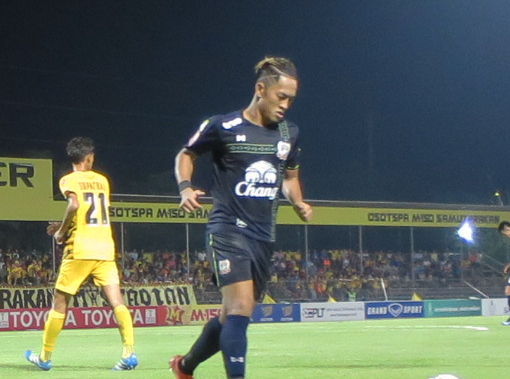

Personal information
- Full name: Jakkapan Pornsai
- Date of birth: 28 March 1987 (age 39)
- Place of birth: Nong Khai, Thailand
- Height: 1.68 m (5 ft 6 in)
- Position: Winger

Team information
- Current team: Kasetsart
- Number: 7

Youth career
- 2005–2008: University of Technology Thonburi

Senior career*
Years	Team	Apps	(Gls)
2009–2010	Police United	46	(13)
2011–2013	Muangthong United	15	(1)
2014–2016	Suphanburi	78	(19)
2016–2017	Bangkok Glass	23	(5)
2017–2019	Bangkok United	15	(0)
2018	→ Ratchaburi Mitr Phol (loan)	15	(0)
2019	→ Ratchaburi Mitr Phol (loan)	12	(1)
2020–2022	Ratchaburi Mitr Phol	28	(1)
2022–2023	Ayutthaya United	30	(1)
2023–2024	Chiangmai	21	(1)
2024–	Kasetsart	33	(2)

International career
2010	Thailand U23	3	(0)
2011–2015	Thailand	18	(3)

Managerial career
- 2020–2022: Ratchaburi Mitr Phol (assistant)
- 2023–2024: Chiangmai (assistant)
- 2023: Chiangmai (caretaker)
Medal record
Thailand
Asean Football Championship
Runner-up	AFF Suzuki Cup 2012	2012
- * Club domestic league appearances and goals as of 24 May 2025

Jakkapan Pornsai (Thai: จักรพันธ์ พรใส, born March 28, 1987), simply known as Ball (Thai: บอล), is a Thai professional footballer who plays as a winger for Thai League 2 club Kasetsart.

== Career ==
=== Police United and Muangthong United ===
Jakkapan started his career in Police United during 2009, and moved to Muangthong United in 2011, where he got a successful career include winning the champion of 2012 TPL. Jakkapan stayed for 3 years and scored 9 goals for Muangthong United.

=== Suphanburi ===
Jakkapan joined Suphanburi in 2014 and signed 3 years contract. In his first season, he scored 4 league goals in 26 games.

In 2015, Jakkapan had a great season as he scored 13 goals and also provided 14 assists, helped the team to secure the third place of 2015 TPL. Jakkapan scored 4 goals in first 5 matches, earned the February Thai Premier League Player of the Month. At the end of the season, Goal.com also selected Jakkapan in the best XI of 2015 TPL.

In 2016, Jakkapan scored 2 penalties in 13 matches before moving to Bangkok Glass.

=== Bangkok Glass ===
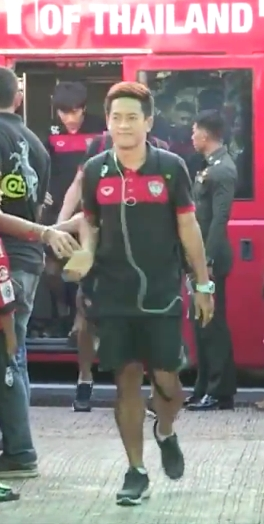
Jakkapan Pornsai with Muangthong United in 2013

26 May 2016, Jakkapan joined Bangkok Glass. He scored 5 goals for Glass before moving to Bangkok United.

=== Bangkok United ===
Bangkok United have completed the signing of Jakkapan on 10 June 2017. He joined Ratchaburi Mitr Phol FC during the second-leg of 2018 season

=== Ratchaburi Mitr Phol ===
After being loaned from Bangkok United for half of season 2018 and completing season 2019 in Ratchaburi, the winger finally committed to remain at Ratchaburi Mitr Phol FC until the end of his footballing career, starting the 2020 season.

== International career ==
Jakkapan selected into national team in 2011 and he is part of Thailand's 2012 AFF Suzuki Cup.

In May 2015, he was called up by Thailand to play in the 2018 FIFA World Cup qualification (AFC) against Vietnam.

== Statistics ==
As of 3 March 2021

Club	Season	League			FA Cup		League Cup		AFC Champion League		Other		Total	
Club	Season	Division	Apps	Goals	Apps	Goals	Apps	Goals	Apps	Goals	Apps	Goals	Apps	Goals
Muangthong United	2013	Thai League 1	15	1	?	?	?	?	3	0	1	0	19	1
Suphanburi	2014	Thai League 1	32	4	?	?	?	?	—	—	—	—	24	2
Suphanburi	2015	Thai League 1	33	13	?	?	?	?	—	—	—	—	33	13
Suphanburi	2016	Thai League 1	13	2	0	0	0	0	—	—	—	—	13	2
Bangkok Glass	2016	Thai League 1	12	3	?	?	?	?	—	—	—	—	12	3
Bangkok Glass	2017	Thai League 1	11	2	0	0	0	0	—	—	—	—	11	2
Bangkok United	2017	Thai League 1	4	0	1	0	0	0	—	—	—	—	5	0
Bangkok United	2018	Thai League 1	7	0	0	0	1	2	—	—	—	—	8	2
Ratchaburi Mitr Phol (On loan)	2018	Thai League 1	15	0	5	0	0	0	—	—	—	—	20	0
Bangkok United	2019	Thai League 1	4	0	1	0	1	0	0	0	—	—	6	0
Ratchaburi Mitr Phol (On loan)	2019	Thai League 1	12	1	0	0	0	0	—	—	—	—	12	1
Ratchaburi Mitr Phol	2020-21	Thai League 1	5	0	0	0	0	0	—	—	—	—	5	0
Total			163	26	7	0	2	2	3	0	1	0	176	28

=== International ===
As of 27 March 2016

National team	Year	Apps	Goals
Thailand	2011	2	1
Thailand	2012	8	1
Thailand	2013	3	0
Thailand	2014	1	0
Thailand	2015	4	1
Thailand	Total	18	3

=== International goals ===
#	Date	Venue	Opponent	Score	Result	Competition
1.	July 15, 2011	New I-Mobile Stadium, Buriram, Thailand	Myanmar	1–0	1–1(D)	Friendly
2.	November 24, 2012	Rajamangala Stadium, Bangkok, Thailand	Philippines	1–0	2–1(W)	2012 AFF Suzuki Cup
3.	June 6, 2015	Rajamangala Stadium, Bangkok, Thailand	Bahrain	1–0	1–1(D)	Friendly

== Honours ==
=== Club ===
Muangthong united

- Thai League 1 (1): 2012

=== Individual ===
- Thai League T1 Player of the Month (1): February 2015
