= Jetsada Boonruangrod =

Thai footballer (born 1979)

Personal information
- Full name: Jetsada Boonruangrod
- Date of birth: October 1, 1979 (age 47)
- Place of birth: Suphan Buri, Thailand
- Height: 1.74 m (5 ft 8 1/2 in)
- Position: Defensive midfielder

Senior career*
Years	Team	Apps	(Gls)
2006–2008	Bangkok Bank	42	(3)
2009–2012	TTM Phichit	53	(1)
2011	→ Navy (loan)	14	(0)
2012–2015	Suphanburi	29	(0)
2014	→ Angthong (loan)	16	(0)
- * Club domestic league appearances and goals as of 11 July 2015

Jetsada Boonruangrod (Thai: เจษฎา บุญเรืองรอด, born October 1, 1979) is a Thai retired professional footballer who played as a defensive midfielder.
