= Adebayo Gbadebo =

Nigerian football manager (born 1974)

Personal information
- Date of birth: 30 May 1974 (age 52)
- Place of birth: Lagos, Nigeria
- Position: Midfielder

Senior career*
| Years | Team | Apps | (Gls) |
| 1993–1994 | Stationery Stores | 25 | (6) |
| 1994–1998 | Al-Bourj | 76 | (13) |
| 1998–1999 | BEC Tero Sasana | 30 | (5) |
| 1999–2000 | Mohun Bagan AC | 16 | (2) |
| 2000–2002 | BEC Tero Sasana | 58 | (9) |
| 2003–2004 | PSPS Pekanbaru | 12 | (1) |
| Total | | 217 | (37) |

Managerial career
- 2007–2009: Bangkok Christian College
- 2009: Look Isan 2 (assistant)
- 2009–2010: Thai Port (technical director)
- 2011: Rajpracha (technical director)
- 2012–2016: Suphanburi (director)
- 2017–2018: Suphanburi
- 2019–2022: Suphanburi
- 2022–2023: Kanjanapat
- 2023: Samut Sakhon City
- 2025–: Muangthong United (assistant)
- * Club domestic league appearances and goals

Adebayo Gbadebo (born 30 May 1974) is a Nigerian football manager and former player, He is currently assistant coach of Thai League 1 club Muangthong United.

== Early life and education ==
Gbadebo attended Ansar Ud Seen Primary School Odunfa at Ebute Metta in Lagos State and Ansar Ud Been Grammar School at Randle Avenue Surulere, Lagos State, for his Secondary School Certificate. He also attended Anwar Ul Islam College Agege, Lagos State, for his Advanced Level School Certificate. He attended the University of Ibadan, Oyo State, where he earned his BSc degree in sociology in 1990. While there, Gbadebo was elected Student Union Sports Secretary in 1989.

== Playing career ==
In 1993, Gbadebo joined Stationery Stores F.C. During 1990–1993, Gbadebo was called to play for Nigeria under-20 and under-23 national teams, From 1994 to 1998 he played for Al-Bourj FC and in 1998 moved to BEC Tero Sasana The following year, he went on loan to Mohun Bagan AC, then back again to Thailand to lead BEC Tero Sasana to win the Thai Premier League in 2000–01 and BEC Tero Sasana to the Asia Champions League quarter-final. In 2004, he moved to the Indonesian club PSPS Pekanbaru.

== Managerial career ==
Gbadebo is an "A" license coach (by AFC) is currently coaching Suphanburi F.C. in Thai League 1. He was head coach for Bangkok Christian International School Senior and Under 15 soccer teams from 2007 to 2009 at TISAC Championship, assistant coach for Thai Port FC in the Thailand F.A. Cup Champion in 2010, technical director and head coach of Suphanburi F.C. youth team in 2013, when it was runner up at the Thailand National Youth Championship in 2013. During the 2014 Thai Premier League season, MGbadebo oversaw the club as head coach for five premier league matches (won 4, drew 1) and Thai FA Cup 2nd round match away at Nakhon Pathom (qualified for quarter final).

== Personal life ==
Gbadebo is married with three children.

Gbadebo was ordained as assistant pastor of The Redeemed Christian Church of God in 2006 and ordained as a full pastor in 2009 during the Convention theme "Hope Of Glory". He is the country co-ordinator of the church in Thailand.

== Managerial statistics ==
As of match played 18 May 2022

Managerial record by team and tenure
| Nat. | Team | From | To | Record | | | | |
| Nat. | Team | From | To | P | W | D | L | Win % |
|---|---|---|---|---|---|---|---|---|
| (Thailand) | Suphanburi | 13 May 2014 | 7 June 2014 | 5 | 5 | 0 | 0 | 100.00 |
| (Thailand) | Suphanburi | 22 May 2017 | 23 June 2018 | 43 | 15 | 16 | 12 | 34.88 |
| (Thailand) | Suphanburi | 15 June 2019 | 18 May 2022 | 85 | 26 | 15 | 44 | 30.59 |
| Total | | | | 133 | 46 | 31 | 56 | 34.59 |

^{1} A win or loss by the penalty shoot-out is regarded as the draw in time.
