= Verot Pombuppha =

Thai footballer (born 1992)

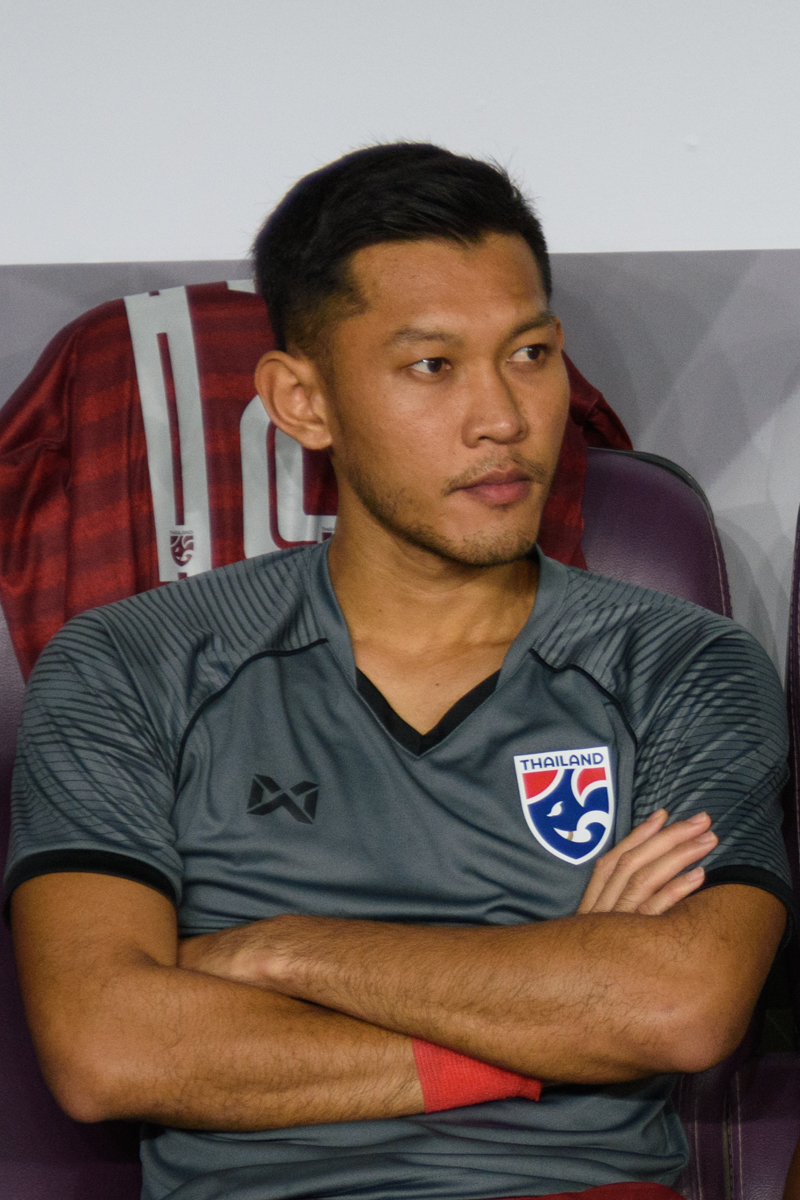
- Pombuppha in January 2019

Personal information
- Full name: Verot Pombuppha
- Date of birth: 17 March 1992 (age 34)
- Place of birth: Pathum Thani, Thailand
- Height: 1.80 m (5 ft 11 in)
- Positions: Forward; winger

Youth career
- 2005–2007: Assumption College Thonburi

Senior career*
Years	Team	Apps	(Gls)
2008–2010	Muangthong United	18	(2)
2010–2011	Police United	26	(6)
2012–2014	Osotspa	58	(25)
2015–2016	Muangthong United	29	(11)
2016	→ BEC Tero Sasana (loan)	18	(5)
2016–2019	Suphanburi	80	(17)
2019–2023	Bangkok United	52	(11)
2024–2025	BG Pathum United	22	(4)
2025–2026	Ayutthaya United	24	(4)

International career
2009–2010	Thailand U19	8	(3)
2009–2015	Thailand U23	14	(8)
2010–2019	Thailand	10	(0)
Medal record
Thailand under-19
AFF U-19 Youth Championship
Winner	AFF U-19 Youth Championship 2009	Football
Thailand under-23
Sea Games
Gold medal – first place	Sea Games 2013	Football
Gold medal – first place	Sea Games 2015	Football
- * Club domestic league appearances and goals as of 18 February 2026 (UTC)

Verot Pombuppha (Thai: เวโรจน์ ป้อมบุปผา; born 17 March 1992), former name Chananan Pombuppha (Thai: ชนานันท์ ป้อมบุปผา;, born 17 March 1992) simply known as Two (Thai: ทู), is a Thai professional footballer who plays as a forward for Thai League 1 club Ayutthaya United, he has also been used as a winger.

== Club career ==
Pombuppha began his professional career with Muangthong United, who he won the Thai League 1 with in 2009. He joined Police United on loan in 2010 as part of a transfer that brought Jakkaphan Pornsai to Muangthong. On 17 July it was announced that Pombuppha would be joining Suphanburi on a two-year contract.

== International career ==
He made his debut for the Thailand national team in May 2010 against South Africa. Chananan was included in the starting lineup for the match. Chananan was included in the under-23 squad in the 2014 Asian Games. He scored one goal in the tournament. He won two consecutive SEA Games gold medals in 2013 and 2015 and is one of the 2015 tournament's top scorers. In 2018, he was called up for the 2018 AFF Suzuki Cup.

== Honours ==
=== Club ===
==== Muangthong United ====
- Thai League 1: 2009

==== Bangkok United ====
- Thailand Champions Cup: 2023

==== BG Pathum United ====
- Thai League Cup: 2023–24

=== International ===
Thailand U19

- AFF U-19 Youth Championship: 2009

Thailand U23

- SEA Games Gold Medal (2): 2013, 2015
