= Sakolwat Skollah =

Thai footballer (born 1991)

Personal information
- Full name: Sakolwat Skollah
- Date of birth: 22 February 1991 (age 35)
- Place of birth: Khon Kaen, Thailand
- Height: 1.78 m (5 ft 10 in)
- Position: Centre back

Team information
- Current team: Chanthaburi
- Number: 2

Senior career*
Years	Team	Apps	(Gls)
2010	Khon Kaen	14	(0)
2011–2012	Suphanburi	24	(0)
2013	Bangkok	11	(0)
2014	Khon Kaen	28	(0)
2015–2017	Suphanburi	1	(0)
2015	→ TOT (loan)	12	(0)
2018	Khon Kaen United	21	(1)
2019	Simork	1	(0)
2019	Ayutthaya United	12	(0)
2020	Khon Kaen Mordindang	1	(0)
2020–2022	Nakhon Si United	35	(0)
2022	Kasem Bundit University	13	(0)
2023	Nakhon Si United	2	(0)
2023–	Chanthaburi	46	(0)

International career^{‡}
2013	Thailand U23	6	(0)
Medal record
Thailand under-23
Sea Games
Gold medal – first place	Sea Games 2013	Football
- * Club domestic league appearances and goals as of 30 April 2023 ‡ National team caps and goals as of 22 December 2013

Sakolwat Skollah (Thai: สกลวัชร์ สกลหล้า, born February 22, 1991) is a Thai retired professional footballer who plays as a centre back for Chanthaburi in the Thai League 2.

== International career ==
He represented Thailand U23 in the 2013 Southeast Asian Games.

== Honours ==
=== International ===
Thailand U-23

- Sea Games
  - Gold Medal (1); 2013
