= Wattanasap Jarernsri =

Thai footballer (born 1989)

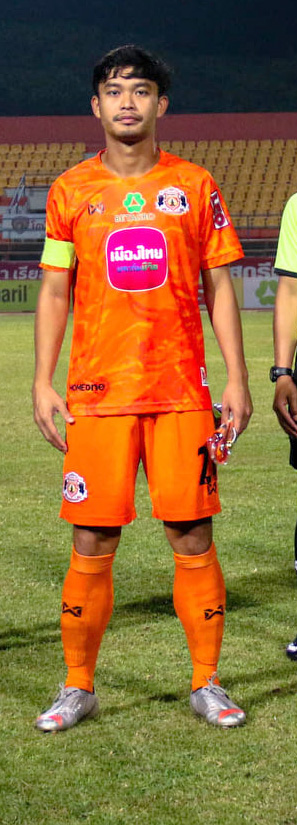
- Wattanasap Jarernsri playing for Sisaket.

Personal information
- Full name: Wattanasap Jarernsri
- Date of birth: 1 January 1989 (age 37)
- Place of birth: Loei, Thailand
- Height: 1.70 m (5 ft 7 in)
- Position: Midfielder

Youth career
- 2008: Chula United

Senior career*
Years	Team	Apps	(Gls)
2009–2014	BBCU	107	(5)
2015–2016	Suphanburi	14	(1)
2017	Chiangmai	19	(0)
2018–2019	Chonburi	13	(0)
2019	→Thai Honda (loan)	1	(0)
2020–2021	Sisaket	16	(2)
2021–	Songkhla	0	(0)

International career
2008–2009	Thailand U19		
- * Club domestic league appearances and goals as of 22 June 2008

Wattanasap Jarernsri (Thai: วัฒนศัพท์ เจริญศรี, born January 1, 1989), is a Thai professional footballer who plays as a midfielder.
