= Parndecha Ngernprasert =

Thai footballer (born 1994)

Personal information
- Full name: Parndecha Ngernprasert
- Date of birth: 22 October 1994 (age 32)
- Place of birth: Samut Prakan, Thailand
- Height: 1.70 m (5 ft 7 in)
- Position: Midfielder

Team information
- Current team: Rayong
- Number: 18

Youth career
- 2011–2012: Bangkok Glass

Senior career*
Years	Team	Apps	(Gls)
2012–2016	Bangkok Glass	26	(2)
2012	→ Rangsit (loan)	6	(0)
2016–2021	Suphanburi	73	(1)
2021–2026	Khon Kaen United	114	(0)
2026–	Rayong	0	(0)

International career
2011–2012	Thailand U19	3	(0)
2014–2016	Thailand U23	1	(0)
- * Club domestic league appearances and goals

Parndecha Ngernprasert (Thai: ปาณเดชา เงินประเสริฐ), formerly Suban Ngernprasert (Thai: สุบรรณ เงินประเสริฐ) simply known as Bas (Thai: บาส), is a Thai professional footballer who plays as a midfielder for Thai League 2 club Rayong.

== Honours ==
=== Clubs ===
Bangkok Glass

- Thai FA Cup (1): 2014
