= Paitoon Nontadee =

Thai footballer

Personal information
- Full name: Paitoon Nontadee
- Date of birth: 11 August 1987 (age 39)
- Place of birth: Chaiyaphum, Thailand
- Height: 1.81 m (5 ft 11 1/2 in)
- Position: Winger

Senior career*
Years	Team	Apps	(Gls)
2007–2009	Chula United	51	(6)
2010	Muangthong United	12	(0)
2011	BEC Tero Sasana	18	(1)
2012–2014	Police United	43	(3)
2014–2016	Bangkok United	34	(3)
2015–2017	Suphanburi	7	(0)
2017	Prachuap	14	(2)
2018	Nakhon Ratchasima	12	(0)
2019–2020	Sukhothai	6	(0)
Total		197	(15)

International career
2010–2013	Thailand	1	(0)
- * Club domestic league appearances and goals as of 05:02, 15 October 2018 (UTC)

Paitoon Nontadee (Thai: ไพฑูรย์ นนทะดี, born August 11, 1987), simply known as Aum (Thai: อุ้ม) is a Thai retired professional footballer who plays as a winger.

== International career ==
He made his debut for the Thailand national team in May 2010 against South Africa.

=== International ===
As of 12 November 2015

National team	Year	Apps	Goals
Thailand	2010	1	0
Thailand	Total	1	0

== Honours ==
=== Clubs ===
Muangthong United

- Thai Premier League (1): 2010
- Kor Royal Cup (1): 2010
