= Piyarat Lajungreed =

Thai footballer

Personal information
- Full name: Piyarat Lajungreed
- Date of birth: 18 September 1991 (age 35)
- Place of birth: Nakhon Ratchasima, Thailand
- Height: 1.75 m (5 ft 9 in)
- Position: Left back

Team information
- Current team: Bangkok
- Number: 13

Senior career*
Years	Team	Apps	(Gls)
2011	Buriram	28	(1)
2012	Buriram United	7	(0)
2013	Pattaya United	24	(0)
2014–2015	Suphanburi	31	(0)
2015	→ Bangkok United (loan)	2	(0)
2016–2024	Sukhothai	193	(3)
2024–	Bangkok	0	(0)

International career
2009–2010	Thailand U19		
- * Club domestic league appearances and goals as of 12:56, 14 March 2024 (UTC)

Piyarat Lajungreed (Thai: ปิยะราษฎร์ ลาจังหรีด; born September 18, 1991), simply known as Sun (Thai: ซัน) is a Thai professional footballer who plays as a left back for Thai League T2 club Bangkok.
