= Prat Samakrat =

Thai footballer (born 1985)

Personal information
- Full name: Prat Samakrat
- Date of birth: 31 October 1985 (age 41)
- Place of birth: Nakhon Pathom, Thailand
- Height: 1.80 m (5 ft 11 in)
- Position: Centre-back

Youth career
- 1998–2004: Suankularb Wittayalai School
- 2004: Bangkok University

Senior career*
Years	Team	Apps	(Gls)
2004–2005	Bangkok United	27	(0)
2006–2012	BEC Tero Sasana	102	(2)
2013–2016	Suphanburi	60	(3)
2016–2019	Bangkok United	1	(0)
2017–2018	→ Sukhothai (loan)	38	(1)
2020–2021	Nakhon Pathom United	23	(0)
2022–2023	DP Kanchanaburi	7	(1)
Total		258	(7)

International career^{‡}
2005–2007	Thailand U23		
2006–2012	Thailand	12	(1)
Medal record
Thailand under-23
Sea Games
Gold medal – first place	Sea Games 2005	Football
Gold medal – first place	Sea Games 2007	Football
- * Club domestic league appearances and goals as of 20 May 2023 ‡ National team caps and goals as of 29 February 2012

Prat Samakrat (Thai: ปรัชญ์ สมัครราษฎร์, born October 31, 1985), is a Thai retired professional footballer who played as a centre-back.

== International goals ==
#	Date	Venue	Opponent	Score	Result	Competition
1.	February 16, 2006	Ayutthaya, Thailand	Iraq	4–3	Won	Friendly

== Honours ==
=== Club ===
Dragon Pathumwan Kanchanaburi

- Thai League 3 Western Region: 2022–23

=== International ===
Thailand U-23

- Sea Games
  - Gold Medal (2); 2005, 2007
