= Apiwich Phulek =

Thai footballer (born 1988)

Personal information
- Full name: Apiwich Phulek
- Date of birth: 5 February 1988 (age 38)
- Place of birth: Ayutthaya, Thailand
- Height: 1.78 m (5 ft 10 in)
- Positions: Left back; left winger

Senior career*
| Years | Team | Apps | (Gls) |
| 2009 | Thai Port | 0 | (0) |
| 2010 | Customs United | 11 | (0) |
| 2011 | Samut Songkhram | 5 | (0) |
| 2012–2014 | BEC Tero Sasana | 7 | (0) |
| 2014–2016 | Suphanburi | 19 | (1) |
| 2016 | Bangkok Glass | 2 | (0) |
| 2017 | Chiangmai | 8 | (0) |
| 2018 | Air Force Central | 2 | (0) |
| 2018–2019 | Udon Thani | 0 | (0) |
| 2019 | Samut Sakhon | 24 | (0) |
| 2020 | MOF Customs United | | |
| 2020–2021 | Samut Sakhon | 22 | (1) |
| 2021–2022 | Angthong | 22 | (1) |
| 2023 | Suphanburi | 8 | (0) |
| 2025–2025 | Lopburi City | 9 | (0) |
- * Club domestic league appearances and goals

Apiwich Phulek (Thai: อภิวิชฐ์ ภู่เล็ก, born February 5, 1988, as Jetsada Phulek), simply known as Lek (Thai: เล็ก), is a Thai professional former footballer who played as a winger. On 28 August 2021, he joined Angthong of Thai League 3. He played for Suphanburi in the 2022–23 Thai League 2 but was among a number of players released by the club at the end of the season.

== Honours ==
=== Club ===
Thai Port

- Thai FA Cup: 2009
