= Chotinan Theerapatpong =

Thai footballer (born 1992)

Personal information
- Full name: Chotinan Theerapatpong
- Date of birth: 30 June 1992 (age 34)
- Place of birth: Nong Khai, Thailand
- Height: 1.73 m (5 ft 8 in)
- Position: Right-back

Youth career
- 2010–2012: Debsirin School
- 2012–2013: Chainat Hornbill

Senior career*
Years	Team	Apps	(Gls)
2013–2019	Chainat Hornbill	56	(0)

International career
2015	Thailand U23		
- * Club domestic league appearances and goals

Chotinan Theerapatpong (Thai: โชตินันท์ ธีรภัทรพงศ์, born 30 June 1992), simply known as Nan (Thai: นัน), is a Thai former professional footballer who plays as a right-back.

== Club career ==
In 2019, Chainat Hornbill announced that he will retire from professional football at 26 years old to focus on a career in business.
