= Anurak Chompoopruk =

Thai professional footballer

Personal information
- Full name: Anurak Chompoopruk
- Date of birth: 5 October 1988 (age 38)
- Place of birth: Roi Et, Thailand
- Height: 1.80 m (5 ft 11 in)
- Position: Goalkeeper

Team information
- Current team: Sukhothai
- Number: 20

Senior career*
Years	Team	Apps	(Gls)
2013	Samut Songkhram	0	(0)
2013	Army United	3	(0)
2014–2015	Suphanburi	31	(0)
2016–2017	PTT Rayong	14	(0)
2018	Ubon UMT United	14	(0)
2019–2020	Samut Prakan City	7	(0)
2020	Sukhothai	0	(0)
2025-	Roiet PB	0	(0)
- * Club domestic league appearances and goals

Anurak Chompoopruk (Thai: อนุรักษ์ ชมภูพฤกษ์, born 5 October 1988) is a Thai professional footballer who plays as a goalkeeper for Thai League 1 club Sukhothai.
