= Baworn Tapla =

Thai footballer (born 1988)

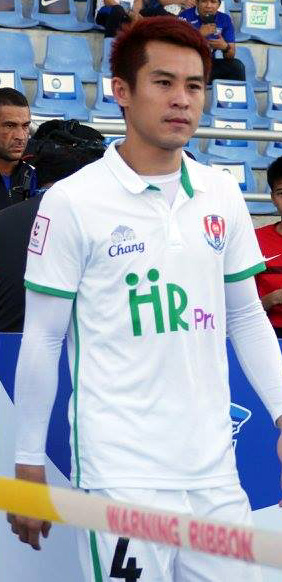
- Navy FC, 2017

Personal information
- Full name: Baworn Tapla
- Date of birth: 20 February 1988 (age 38)
- Place of birth: Phayao, Thailand
- Height: 1.60 m (5 ft 3 in)
- Position: Midfielder

Team information
- Current team: Lamphun Warriors
- Number: 32

Senior career*
Years	Team	Apps	(Gls)
2009–2011	North Bangkok College	28	(0)
2012–2013	Trat	51	(2)
2014	Chonburi	14	(0)
2015	Suphanburi	5	(0)
2016	Super Power Samut Prakan	23	(1)
2017	Navy	26	(1)
2018	Sukhothai	28	(0)
2019	Samut Prakan City	18	(1)
2020–2022	Chiangmai United	26	(1)
2022–	Lamphun Warriors	56	(0)
- * Club domestic league appearances and goals as of 14 March 2025

Baworn Tapla (Thai: บวร ตาปลา, born February 20, 1988), simply known as Worn (Thai: วร), is a Thai professional footballer who plays as a midfielder for Thai League 1 club Lamphun Warriors.
