= Sornnarai Chamrurai =

Thai footballer

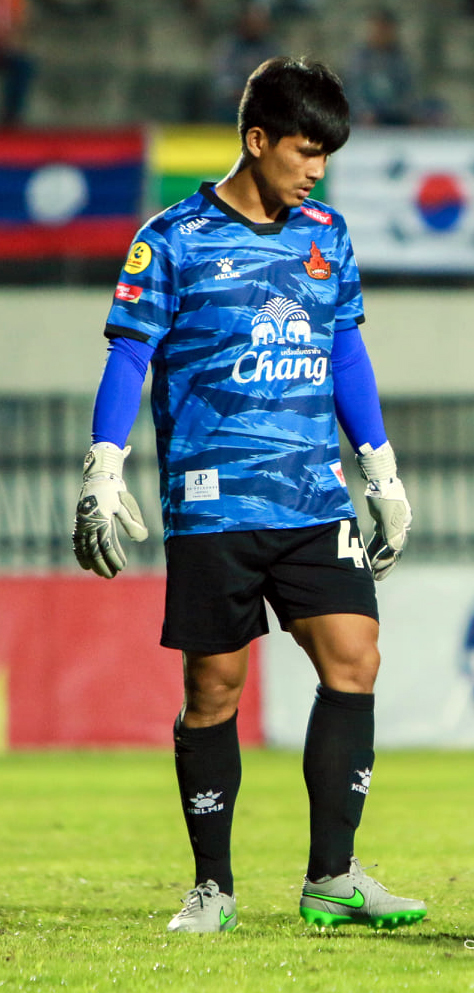
- Sornnarai Chamrurai playing for Udon Thani.

Personal information
- Full name: Sornnarai Chamrurai
- Date of birth: 7 March 1991 (age 35)
- Place of birth: Roi Et, Thailand
- Height: 1.75 m (5 ft 9 in)
- Position: Goalkeeper

Team information
- Current team: Mahasarakham SBT
- Number: 40

Senior career*
Years	Team	Apps	(Gls)
2011–2012	Ayutthaya	16	(0)
2013–2015	TOT	25	(0)
2016	Ayutthaya Warrior	19	(0)
2017	Surat Thani City	12	(0)
2017	Udon Thani	0	(0)
2018	Lampang		
2019–2022	Udon Thani	16	(0)
2022–2023	Samut Songkhram	12	(0)
2023–	Mahasarakham SBT	5	(0)
- * Club domestic league appearances and goals as of 31 October 2024

Sornnarai Chamrurai (Thai: ศรนารายณ์ จำรุราย, born 7 March 1991), simply known as Max (Thai: แม็ก), is a Thai professional footballer who currently plays for Mahasarakham SBT in the Thai League 2 as a goalkeeper.
