= Thanakorn Kamkhoma =

Thai footballer (born 1982)

Personal information
- Full name: Thanakorn Kamkhoma
- Date of birth: July 12, 1982 (age 44)
- Place of birth: Uthai Thani, Thailand
- Height: 1.74 m (5 ft 8 1/2 in)
- Position: Right back

Senior career*
Years	Team	Apps	(Gls)
2010–2013	Chainat Hornbill	39	(1)
2013–2014	Suphanburi	20	(0)
2014–2017	Chainat Hornbill	46	(0)
- * Club domestic league appearances and goals as of 11:40, 23 September 2017 (UTC)

Thanakorn Kamkhoma (Thai: ธนากร ขำโขมะ, born 12 July 1982), simply known as Jok (Thai: โจ๊ก), is a Thai former professional footballer.

== Club career ==
He was one of the Chainat Hornbill legend because he played with Chainat Hornbill from 2010 to 2013 and the second time in 2014 to 2017 total 8 years so that he had nickname "prince of hornbills".
