= Carmelo González (footballer) =

Spanish footballer (born 1983)

Carmelo
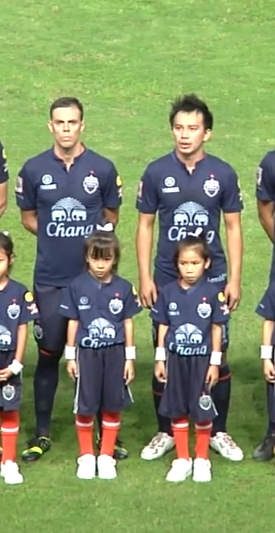
- Carmelo (left) lining up for Buriram United in 2013

Personal information
- Full name: Carmelo José González Jiménez
- Date of birth: 9 July 1983 (age 43)
- Place of birth: Las Palmas, Spain
- Height: 1.80 m (5 ft 11 in)
- Position: Attacking midfielder

Youth career
- Las Palmas

Senior career*
Years	Team	Apps	(Gls)
2000–2001	Las Palmas B		
2001–2005	Las Palmas	120	(14)
2005–2008	Levante	37	(5)
2007	→ Hércules (loan)	19	(1)
2007–2008	→ Numancia (loan)	38	(7)
2008–2013	Sporting Gijón	91	(7)
2013–2014	Buriram United	50	(36)
2015–2016	Suphanburi	31	(10)
2016	Al-Ittihad		
2017–2023	Arucas		
Total		386+	(80+)

International career
2000	Spain U16	5	(2)
2001	Spain U17	4	(0)
2001–2002	Spain U19	9	(5)
2003	Spain U20	1	(0)
2004	Spain U21	1	(0)
- * Club domestic league appearances and goals

Carmelo José González Jiménez (born 9 July 1983), known simply as Carmelo, is a Spanish former professional footballer who played as an attacking midfielder.

He spent most of his extensive career with Las Palmas, Sporting de Gijón (competing in La Liga with both clubs) and in the Thai Premier League.

== Club career ==
Born in Las Palmas, Canary Islands, Carmelo graduated from his hometown club UD Las Palmas' youth ranks. In his first appearance with the main squad, in 2001–02's La Liga, he scored in a 3–0 away win against RCD Mallorca on 26 August 2001, and would play a further three seasons with them in the Segunda División (two) and the Segunda División B (one).

Carmelo joined Levante UD in 2005–06 on a four-year contract, where he would be a key figure in the Valencian Community side's promotion to the top division. He appeared in only six matches the following campaign, finishing it with Hércules CF on loan.

For 2007–08, Carmelo moved to CD Numancia still owned by Levante, scoring seven goals (third-best in squad) en route to another top-flight promotion. He then switched the next season to another promotee, Sporting de Gijón, netting in back-to-back wins in October against Mallorca, CA Osasuna and Deportivo de La Coruña as the Asturians retained their league status.

In the following three seasons, Carmelo struggled with injury but managed to be relatively used, only being able to score once over 58 games however. His team suffered relegation at the end of the 2011–12 campaign.

Carmelo left Sporting in February 2013, moving abroad for the first time shortly after as he signed with Thai Premier League's Buriram United FC. He won the national championship in his first year, being top scorer in the process.

In early July 2016, aged 33, Carmelo switched countries and joined Al-Ittihad Kalba SC in the UAE Pro League. The following season, he returned to his homeland with Arucas CF in the Canarian regional divisions.

== International career ==
Carmelo earned his sole cap for the Spain under-21 team on 17 February 2004, as a 77th-minute substitute in a 2–1 friendly home win against Norway.

== Career statistics ==
As of 5 November 2014

Club	Division	Season	League		National Cup		Continental		Other		Total	
Club	Division	Season	Apps	Goals	Apps	Goals	Apps	Goals	Apps	Goals	Apps	Goals
Las Palmas	La Liga	2001–02	20	1	2	0	—		—		22	1
Las Palmas	Segunda División	2002–03	31	3	1	0	—		—		32	3
Las Palmas	Segunda División	2003–04	35	4	1	0	—		—		36	4
Las Palmas	Segunda División B	2004–05	34	6	1	0	—		—		35	6
Las Palmas	Total		120	14	5	0	—		—		125	14
Levante	Segunda División	2005–06	31	5	1	0	—		—		32	5
Levante	La Liga	2006–07	6	0	2	0	—		—		8	0
Levante	Total		37	5	3	0	—		—		40	5
Hércules	Segunda División	2006–07	19	1	0	0	—		—		19	1
Hércules	Total		19	1	0	0	—		—		19	1
Numancia	Segunda División	2007–08	38	7	0	0	—		—		38	7
Numancia	Total		38	7	0	0	—		—		38	7
Sporting Gijón	La Liga	2008–09	27	6	4	2	—		—		31	8
Sporting Gijón	La Liga	2009–10	27	0	2	0	—		—		29	0
Sporting Gijón	La Liga	2010–11	18	0	1	0	—		—		19	0
Sporting Gijón	La Liga	2011–12	13	1	2	0	—		—		15	1
Sporting Gijón	Segunda División	2012–13	6	0	0	0	—		—		6	0
Sporting Gijón	Total		91	7	9	2	—		—		100	9
Buriram United	Thai Premier League	2013	23	23	6	3	7	0	—		36	26
Buriram United	Thai Premier League	2014	25	12	7	5	5	0	—		37	17
Buriram United	Total		45	35	13	8	12	0	—		70	41
Career totals			353	69	30	10	12	0	—		395	79

== Honours ==
Numancia

- Segunda División: 2007–08

Buriram United

- Thai Premier League: 2013, 2014
- Thai FA Cup: 2013
- Thai League Cup: 2013
- Kor Royal Cup: 2013, 2014

Spain U17

- Meridian Cup: 2001

Spain U19

- UEFA European Championship: 2002

Individual

- Thai Premier League top scorer: 2013
