= Pattanan Pijittham =

Thai footballer

Personal information
- Full name: Pattanan Pijittham
- Date of birth: 4 February 1989 (age 37)
- Place of birth: Ubon Ratchathani, Thailand
- Height: 1.80 m (5 ft 11 in)
- Position: Goalkeeper

Team information
- Current team: Kasetsart

Youth career
- 2006–2008: Chainat

Senior career*
Years	Team	Apps	(Gls)
2009–2012	Chainat	87	(0)
2013–2014	Chonburi	8	(0)
2015–2016	Suphanburi	13	(0)
2017	Chonburi	3	(0)
2018–2019	Chiangmai	5	(0)
2019	→ JL Chiangmai United (loan)	13	(0)
2020	MOF Customs United		
2020–	Kasetsart		

International career
2011	Thailand U23		
- * Club domestic league appearances and goals as of 4 July 2019

Pattanan Pijittham (Thai: พัทธนันท์ พิจิตรธรรม, born February 2, 1989), simply known as Champ (Thai: แชมป์), is a Thai professional footballer who plays as a goalkeeper for Thai League 2 club Kasetsart.
