= Chakrit Buathong =

Thai footballer (born 1985)

Personal information
- Full name: Chakrit Buathong
- Date of birth: 8 September 1985 (age 41)
- Place of birth: Phetchabun, Thailand
- Height: 1.72 m (5 ft 7 1/2 in)
- Position: Winger

Youth career
- 2000: Nakhon Sawan Sports School
- 2001–2002: Suankularb Wittayalai School
- 2003–2006: Thammasat University

Senior career*
Years	Team	Apps	(Gls)
2006–2010	BEC Tero Sasana	92	(23)
2010–2013	Police United	20	(11)
2013–2015	Chonburi	43	(6)
2015–2017	Suphanburi	24	(1)
2018	Army United	16	(3)
2019	Kasetsart	30	(0)
2020–2021	MOF Customs United	19	(1)
Total		244	(45)

International career^{‡}
2000	Thailand U16	8	(4)
2002	Thailand U18	5	(0)
2002–2004	Thailand U20	14	(6)
2005	Thailand U23	17	(7)
2011–2012	Thailand	3	(0)
- * Club domestic league appearances and goals as of 2 March 2019 ‡ National team caps and goals as of 29 February 2012

Chakrit Buathong (Thai: ชาคริต บัวทอง, born September 8, 1985), is a Thai retired professional footballer who played as a winger.

== Honours ==
=== International ===
Thailand U-23

- Sea Games Gold Medal (1); 2005

== International career ==
In July, 2011 Chakrit was called up in a friendly match against Myanmar.

=== International ===
As of 12 November 2015

National team	Year	Apps	Goals
Thailand	2011	3	0
Thailand	Total	3	0
