= Thossaphol Yodchan =

Thai footballer

Personal information
- Full name: Thossaphol Yodchan
- Date of birth: 1 March 1986 (age 40)
- Place of birth: Surin, Thailand
- Height: 1.73 m (5 ft 8 in)
- Position: Left winger

Senior career*
Years	Team	Apps	(Gls)
2014	Air Force United	34	(3)
2015–2016	Suphanburi	20	(0)
2017–2018	Khon Kaen		
2019	Nongbua Pitchaya	29	(4)
2020	Lampang	3	(0)
2020–2021	Songkhla	18	(3)
2021–2022	Pattaya Dolphins United	15	(5)
2022	Bankhai United	10	(0)
2023	Pattaya Dolphins United	0	(0)
2023	→ Banbueng (loan)	8	(0)
2023	Kasetsart	6	(0)
2024	Bankhai United	10	(0)
- * Club domestic league appearances and goals as of 7 April 2024

Thossaphol Yodchan (Thai: ทศพล ยอดจันทร์) is a Thai professional footballer who is currently playing as a left-winger.
