= Supoj Wonghoi =

Thai footballer (born 1987)

Personal information
- Full name: Supoj Wonghoi
- Date of birth: 29 May 1987 (age 39)
- Place of birth: Chonburi, Thailand
- Height: 1.67 m (5 ft 5 1/2 in)
- Position: Defender

Team information
- Current team: Trat
- Number: 3

Youth career
- 2004–2007: Chonburi

Senior career*
Years	Team	Apps	(Gls)
2008–2012	Sriracha	52	(2)
2012–2016	Suphanburi	57	(1)
2014	→ Army United (loan)	20	(0)
2016–2017	Ubon UMT United	5	(0)
2017	→ Thai Honda Ladkrabang (loan)	11	(0)
2018	Thai Honda	22	(0)
2019–2021	Trat	46	(0)
2021–2022	Uthai Thani	20	(1)
2022–2024	Pattaya Dolphins United	39	(0)
2024–	Trat	19	(0)
- * Club domestic league appearances and goals as of 26 April 2025

Supoj Wonghoi (Thai: สุพจน์ วงษ์หอย) is a Thai professional footballer. He currently plays for Trat in the Thai League 2.

== Honours ==
=== Club ===
Uthai Thani

- Thai League 3 (1): 2021–22
- Thai League 3 Northern Region (1): 2021–22

Pattaya Dolphins United

- Thai League 3 Eastern Region (1): 2022–23
