= Tinnakorn Asurin =

Thai footballer (born 1990)

Personal information
- Full name: Tinnakorn Asurin
- Date of birth: 19 February 1990 (age 36)
- Place of birth: Chanthaburi, Thailand
- Height: 1.83 m (6 ft 0 in)
- Position: Centre back

Team information
- Current team: Khon Kaen United
- Number: 4

Youth career
- 2007–2008: TA Benjamarachutit

Senior career*
Years	Team	Apps	(Gls)
2009–2011	Chanthaburi	44	(0)
2012–2014	Trat	112	(3)
2015	Saraburi	29	(4)
2016–2020	Suphanburi	95	(5)
2020–2023	Buriram United	14	(0)
2022–2023	→ Khon Kaen United (loan)	10	(0)
2023–	Khon Kaen United	42	(1)
- * Club domestic league appearances and goals as of 13 April 2025

Tinnakorn Asurin (Thai: ทินกร อสุรินทร์, born 19 February 1990) is a Thai professional footballer who plays as a centre back for Thai League 1 club Khon Kaen United.
