= Apisit Kamwang =

Thai footballer (born 1991)

Personal information
- Full name: Apisit Kamwang
- Date of birth: 18 January 1991 (age 35)
- Place of birth: Phayao, Thailand
- Height: 1.75 m (5 ft 9 in)
- Positions: Defensive midfielder; defender

Youth career
- 2008: Thai Honda

Senior career*
Years	Team	Apps	(Gls)
2009	Thai Honda	11	(0)
2010–2011	BEC Tero Sasana	31	(0)
2012	Pattaya United	11	(0)
2013–2017	Suphanburi	27	(1)
2018–2019	Nongbua Pitchaya	17	(0)
2020	Lampang	10	(0)
2021	Surat Thani City	6	(1)
2021	STK Muangnont	4	(0)
2022	Muang Loei United	7	(0)
2022	Udon Thani	9	(1)
2023	Krabi	9	(1)

International career
2009	Thailand U19	3	(0)
- * Club domestic league appearances and goals as of 30 April 2023

Apisit Kamwang (Thai: อภิสิทธิ์ คำวัง) is a Thai professional footballer who plays as a defensive-midfielder.
