= Chitchanok Xaysensourinthone =

Thai footballer (born 1994)

Personal information
- Full name: Chitchanok Xaysensourinthone
- Date of birth: 23 August 1994 (age 32)
- Place of birth: Lausanne, Switzerland
- Height: 1.83 m (6 ft 0 in)
- Positions: Forward; winger

Team information
- Current team: Mahasarakham SBT
- Number: 23

Youth career
- 2010–2011: FC Lausanne-Sport
- 2011–2012: Sampdoria B

Senior career*
Years	Team	Apps	(Gls)
2010–2011	Yverdon-Sport	10	(1)
2012	→ Buriram United (loan)	2	(0)
2013	Muangthong United	1	(1)
2014–2015	BEC Tero Sasana	4	(2)
2014	→ PTT Rayong (loan)	9	(2)
2015–2017	Suphanburi	25	(6)
2018	FC Chiasso	4	(0)
2019–2021	Nakhon Ratchasima	39	(7)
2021–2024	BG Pathum United	2	(0)
2022–2024	→ Chiangmai (loan)	24	(5)
2024	Chiangrai United	6	(0)
2025–	Mahasarakham SBT	14	(0)

International career
2015	Thailand U23	1	(0)
- * Club domestic league appearances and goals as of 07:19, 3 May 2024 (UTC)

Chitchanok Xaysensourinthone (Thai: ชิตชนก ไชยเสนสุรินธร, RTGS: Chitchanok Chaisensurinthon, Lao: ຊິດຊນົກ ໄຊຍະເສນສຸຣິນທອນ; born 23 August 1994) is a professional footballer who plays as a forward or a winger for Thai League 2 club Mahasarakham SBT. Born in Switzerland, he has represented Thailand at youth level.

== Early life ==
Chitchanok was born in Lausanne. His father is Lao and his mother is Thai who own an Asian restaurant.

== Career ==
=== Sampdoria ===
At the age of thirteen Chitchanok joined the local team Yverdon-Sport's youth side, and after impressing at various Swiss youth levels had the opportunity to join Sampdoria's B team where he trained with future stars such as Mauro Icardi. A serious knee injury kept him out of the game for a year, but desiring to play for his mother's birthplace Chitchanok took the opportunity to join Buriram United with Charyl Chappuis, although because of that injury never made a first team appearance.

=== Muangthong United ===
He then joined Muangthong United, although once again because of injury only played in the last game of the season where he scored a goal. BEC Tero Sasana's head coach Božidar Bandović was impressed by his performances though and had Chitchanok join his team. He scored his second professional goal in a win over Port in February 2015.

=== Suphanburi ===
Chitchanok joined Suphanburi and as a teammate with Chappuis again in August 2015. He scored his first goal for Supahnburi to level the score with Muangthong United in 2-2 match on 8 November and selected as Goal.com's Young Player of the Week.

== International career ==
He was first called up to the under-23 Thailand team in a friendly in 2015. Because of his Lao origins and birth in Switzerland, he is eligible to represent Thailand, Laos and Switzerland.
