= Dellatorre =

Brazilian footballer (born 1992)

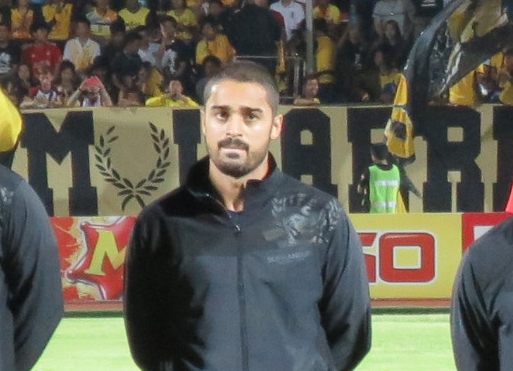

Personal information
- Full name: Guilherme Augusto Alves Dellatorre
- Date of birth: 1 May 1992 (age 34)
- Place of birth: São José do Rio Preto, Brazil
- Height: 1.82 m (6 ft 0 in)
- Position: Striker

Team information
- Current team: Vila Nova
- Number: 49

Youth career
- 2007–2010: Rio Preto
- 2010–2011: Desportivo Brasil

Senior career*
Years	Team	Apps	(Gls)
2010	Rio Preto	4	(0)
2011–2013	Desportivo Brasil	0	(0)
2011–2012	→ Internacional (loan)	13	(0)
2012–2013	→ Porto B (loan)	36	(11)
2013–2016	Atlético Paranaense	67	(8)
2014	→ Queens Park Rangers (loan)	0	(0)
2016	→ Suphanburi (loan)	26	(10)
2017	Suphanburi	22	(14)
2018–2019	APOEL	35	(12)
2019	Suphanburi	9	(3)
2020	Mirassol	2	(0)
2020–2021	Brasil de Pelotas	26	(3)
2021	CSA	41	(16)
2022	Atlético Goianiense	8	(1)
2022–2023	Montedio Yamagata	57	(14)
2024	Mirassol	45	(17)
2025	Coritiba	34	(10)
2026–	Vila Nova	14	(8)
- * Club domestic league appearances and goals as of 14 April 2026

Guilherme Augusto Alves Dellatorre (born 1 May 1992), simply known as Dellatorre, is a Brazilian footballer who plays as a striker for Vila Nova.

== Club career ==
Born in São José do Rio Preto, Dellatorre represented Rio Preto Esporte Clube and Desportivo Brasil as a youth. Playing on loan at the latter, he contributed to the side in the 2011 São Paulo Junior Football Cup by scoring seven goals and becoming the top scorer of the tournament.

After senior professional stints with Rio Preto in the 2010 Paulista A2 and Desportivo Brasil in the same year, Dellatorre signed with Sport Club Internacional on loan in 2011. But after having to score any goal in the season's Série A, he was assigned to the under-20 team.

On 6 July 2012, Dellatorre joined Portuguese club FC Porto on a season long loan deal, and was assigned to the B-team. On 4 January 2013, he was called to the main team by manager Vítor Pereira for a league match against CD Nacional. He was an unused substitute in the match.

On 3 July 2013, Dellatorre joined Atlético Paranaense. He scored five goals in 31 matches, as his side ended the league on the third position. On 31 January 2014, he was loaned to English second tier club Queens Park Rangers. He made his debut for the junior team on 4 March, starting in a 1–0 defeat against Ipswich Town. However, after having failed to make a single appearance with the first team, the club announced at the end of the season that he would return to his parent club.

In the 2015 season, Dellatorre contributed with no goals in nine matches in the national league and two goals in seven matches in the state league, Paranaense. On 12 January 2016, he signed with Thai club Suphanburi F.C. on a year long loan deal.

On 19 December 2017, Dellatorre switched to the Cypriot First Division and signed with APOEL FC.

On 19 December 2024, Dellatorre was announced by Coritiba for the 2025 season.

== Career statistics ==
As of match played on 13 July 2024

Club	Season	National League			State League		Cup		Continental		Total	
Club	Season	Division	Apps	Goals	Apps	Goals	Apps	Goals	Apps	Goals	Apps	Goals
Rio Preto	2010	Paulista A2	—		4	0	0	0	—		4	0
Internacional (loan)	2011	Série A	11	0	0	0	0	0	1 (Note: Appearances in Recopa Sudamericana)	0	12	0
Internacional (loan)	2012	Série A	0	0	1	0	0	0	—		1	0
Internacional (loan)	Total		11	0	1	0	0	0	1	0	13	0
Porto B (loan)	2012–13	Segunda Liga	36	11	—		—		—		36	11
Atlético Paranaense	2013	Série A	22	4	0	0	9	1	—		31	5
Atlético Paranaense	2014	Série A	18	3	0	0	1	0	—		19	3
Atlético Paranaense	2015	Série A	9	0	7	2	2	0	2 (Note: Appearances in Copa Sudamericana)	0	20	2
Atlético Paranaense	Total		49	7	7	2	12	1	2	0	70	10
Queens Park Rangers (loan)	2013–14	Championship	0	0	—		0	0	—		0	0
Suphanburi (loan)	2016	Thai League T1	26	10	—				—		26	10
Suphanburi	2017	Thai League T1	22	14	—		0	0	—		22	14
Suphanburi	Total		48	24	—				—		48	24
APOEL	2017–18	CFD	15	5	—		5	5	0	0	20	10
APOEL	2018–19	CFD	8	0	—		0	0	7 (Note: Appearances in UEFA Europa League and UEFA Champions League)	2	15	2
APOEL	Total		23	5	—		5	5	7	2	35	12
Suphanburi	2019	Thai League T1	9	3	—		0	0	—		9	3
Mirassol	2020	Paulista	—		2	0	0	0	—		2	0
Brasil de Pelotas	2020	Série B	24	3	1	0	1	0	—		26	3
CSA	2021	Série B	32	12	9	4	11	8	—		52	24
Atlético Goianiense	2022	Campeonato Goiano	0	0	8	1	1	1	—		9	2
Montedio Yamagata	2022	J2 League	32	10	—		0	0	0	0	32	10
Montedio Yamagata	2023	J2 League	25	4	—		0	0	—		25	4
Montedio Yamagata	Total		57	14	—		0	0	—		57	14
Mirassol	2024	Paulista	14	6	11	7	0	0	—		25	13
Career total			297	78	43	14	30	15	10	2	380	109

== Honours ==
Internacional

- Recopa Sudamericana: 2011

CSA

- Campeonato Alagoano: 2021
