= Naphat Thamrongsupakorn =

Thai footballer

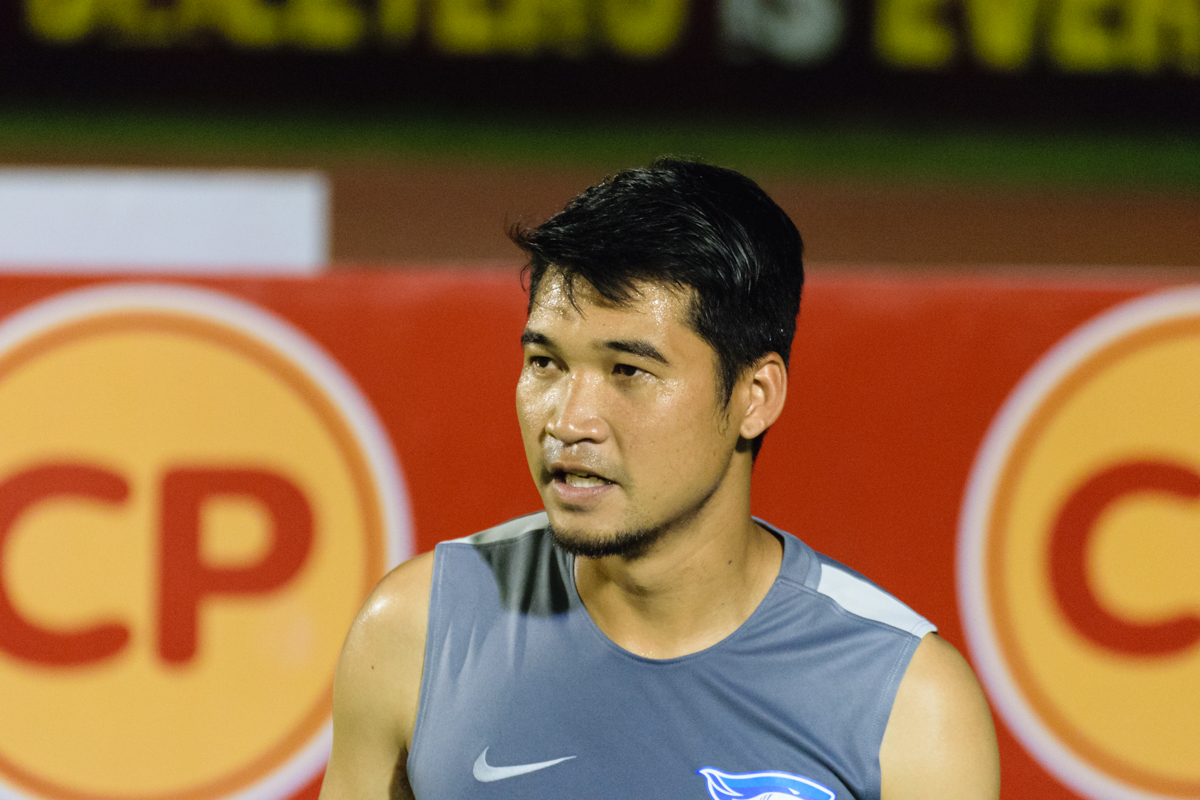

Personal information
- Full name: Naphat Thamrongsupakorn
- Date of birth: 16 November 1987 (age 38)
- Place of birth: Suphan Buri, Thailand
- Height: 1.80 m (5 ft 11 in)
- Position: Striker

Youth career
- 2001–2006: Suphanburi Sports School

Senior career*
Years	Team	Apps	(Gls)
2007	Suphanburi	23	(7)
2008	PEA	2	(0)
2009	Buriram	17	(5)
2010	→ Lopburi (loan)	25	(19)
2011–2012	Samut Songkhram	34	(13)
2013	Muangthong United	6	(0)
2013–2018	Suphanburi	67	(13)
2018	Chonburi	13	(1)
2019	Trat	9	(0)
2020–2021	Muangkan United	13	(3)
2021–2022	Phitsanulok	28	(4)
2022–2023	Samutsongkhram	24	(1)
Total		261	(66)

International career^{‡}
2012	Thailand	3	(2)
- * Club domestic league appearances and goals as of 02:05, 21 April 2026 (UTC) ‡ National team caps and goals as of 3 October 2017 (UTC)

Naphat Thamrongsupakorn (Thai: ณภัทร ธำรงศุภกร; born 16 November 1987), is a Thai retired professional footballer who plays as a striker.

== International career ==
In March 2012, Napat debut for Thailand in a friendly match against Bhutan.

=== International ===
As of 12 November 2015

National team	Year	Apps	Goals
Thailand	2012	3	2
Thailand	Total	3	2

=== International goals ===
#	Date	Venue	Opponent	Score	Result	Competition
1.	14 November 2012	Thai-Japanese Stadium, Thailand	Bhutan	4–0	5–0	International Friendly
2.	17 November 2012	Rajamangala Stadium, Thailand	Bangladesh	5–0	5–0	International Friendly
