= Suphan Buri Provincial Stadium =

Suphanburi Provincial Stadium
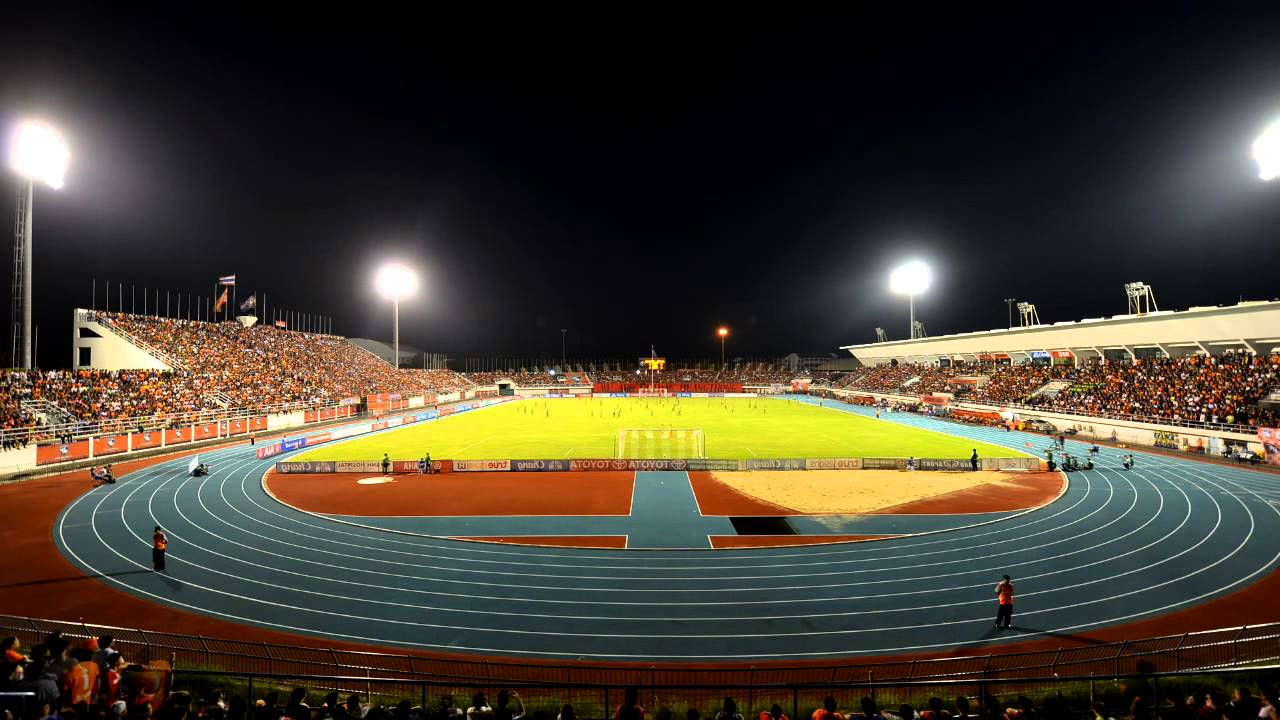
- Interactive map of Suphanburi Provincial Stadium
- Former names: Suphan Buri World War II Stadium (1945-1962)
- Location: Don Kamyan, Mueang Suphan Buri, Suphan Buri, Thailand
- Coordinates: 14°28′27″N 100°05′12″E
- Owner: Suphan Buri
- Operator: Suphanburi F.C.
- Capacity: 15,000

Construction
- Groundbreaking: 25 August 1940
- Built: 5 December 1945
- Opened: 9 September 1947
- Renovated: 1 September 1962 (exterior and interior); 1 August 1987 (exterior); 2018 (all-seated)
- Expanded: 1 September 2001; 2013 (north side added)

Tenant
- Suphanburi F.C. (1998–present)

Suphanburi Provincial Stadium (Thai: สนามกีฬากลางจังหวัดสุพรรณบุรี), formerly known as Suphan Buri World War II Stadium (สนามกีฬาสงครามโลกครั้งที่ 2 จังหวัดสุพรรณบุรี), is a multi-purpose stadium and the home of Suphanburi F.C., located in Suphan Buri, Suphan Buri Province, Thailand. It was opened in 1947 and expanded in 2001.

After Suphanburi F.C. came back to the top level as promoted to 2013 Thai Premier League, the stadium was re-expanded during the early time of the 2013 season as the northern stand was additionally built (only three sides beforehand) and entirely seated. The capacity then turned out to be 25,000 (standing (east and south) and seated (north and west)). Subsequent to the 2015 season (2015 Thai Premier League) and prior to the 2016 season (2016 Thai League T1), the roof of the main stand located on the west was renovated as required by the AFC. Since January 2018, to lift up the club's standards and follow the AFC's club licensing enforced 2019 onwards, the stadium became all-seater bringing the capacity down to 15,000.

Its historical highest attendance was 25,709, for Suphanburi winning 2–1 over Muangthong United in 2015 Thai Premier League on 4 April 2015.

On 1 February 2014, the stadium also held the match of 2014 Kor Royal Cup (acting as Thai super cup), where Buriram United won the trophy by beating Muangthong United 1–0.

== Attendances ==
The follows are the average and highest attendances of Suphanburi F.C. in their domestic league competitions at Suphanburi Provincial Stadium, from 2011 to the present.

Season	Competition	Tier	Average (rank)	Highest (rank)	Match with highest attendance
2011	2011 Thai Division 1 League	2	2,284 (7)	3,500 (10)	n/a
2012	2012 Thai Division 1 League	2	5,495 (2)	8,814 (1)	n/a
2013	2013 Thai Premier League	1	14,322 (2)	21,059 (2)	5 Oct 2013, 1-0 Bangkok Glass
2014	2014 Thai Premier League	1	9,681 (2)	15,679 (2)	9 Apr 2014, 1-1 Buriram United
2015	2015 Thai Premier League	1	10,398 (3)	25,709 (3)	4 Apr 2015, 2-1 Muangthong United
2016	2016 Thai League T1	1	8,980 (4)	17,512 (3)	14 Aug 2016, 0-1 Muangthong United
2017	2017 Thai League T1	1	7,606 (3)	17,559 (2)	22 Oct 2017, 0-1 Buriram United

== International matches ==
Date	Team 1	Score	Team 2	Competition
14 October 2018	Thailand	1-0	Trinidad and Tobago	Friendly
