= Suphanburi F.C. =

Association football club

Suphanburi สุพรรณบุรี เอฟซี
- Full name: Suphanburi Football Club สโมสรฟุตบอลจังหวัดสุพรรณบุรี
- Nicknames: The War Elephants (ช้างศึกยุทธหัตถี)
- Short name: SPFC
- Founded: 1997; 29 years ago
- Ground: Suphan Buri Provincial Stadium; Suphan Buri, Thailand
- Capacity: 15,000
- Chairman: Wanratthamnoon Chansuwan
- Head coach: Bamrung Boonprom
- League: Thai League 3
- 2025–26: Thai League 3, 3rd of 11 in the Western region
- Website: suphanburi-fc.com
Home colours

Suphanburi Football Club (Thai: สโมสรฟุตบอลจังหวัดสุพรรณบุรี) is a Thai professional football club based in Suphan Buri province. The club competes in the Thai League 3, the third tier of Thai football. Their home stadium is Suphan Buri Provincial Stadium.

== Club history ==
Founded in 1998, Suphanburi Football Club became a member of the Thailand Provincial League which ran parallel to the Thai League and was overseen by the Sports Authority of Thailand (SAT). In the league's inaugural year of 1999, the club finished as runners-up. Overall, Suphanburi was one of the most successful teams in the Pro League. They won the league title twice (2002 and 2004) and were also runners up on three occasions.

== League history ==
In 2005 the club finished as runners up in the Thai league and were promoted to the Thai Premier League alongside champions Chonburi, Suphanburi became the first provincial club to join the TPL. However, the clubs moved in very different directions over the subsequent years. Due to a league expansion, Suphanburi avoided relegation. However, a year later Chonburi became champions whilst Suphanburi were relegated. In the following season, Suphanburi finished mid-table in Division 1 and never looked like challenging for promotion. They were relegated from the Thai Division 1 League in 2010. A late decision to expand the 1st division allowed them to regain their 1st division status if they could beat Saraburi FC in a two-legged play-off. The War Elephant won 3–2 on aggregate to retain their place in Division 1. In 2012 the club's first success was a runners-up spot in Division 1 and the team were promoted back into the Thai Premier League. For the 2013 season, few people saw Suphanburi as serious contenders for honours. However, after starting the season with a seven-match unbeaten run, they eventually finished fourth, losing only nine times in their thirty-two game campaign.

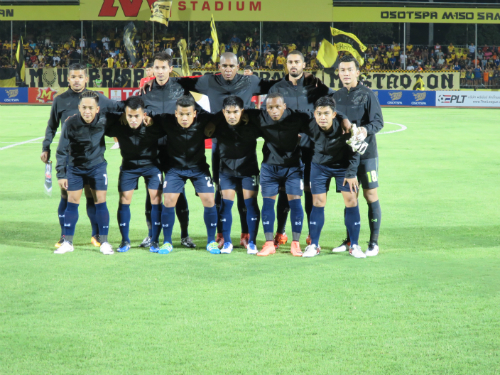
Suphanburi FC 2016

== Academy development ==
The Under 19 team under the guidance of Nigerian coach Sakiru Fagbohun, known as "Coach Ken", reached the final of the 2014 Coke Cup, where they narrowly lost 2–1 to three-time champions Buriram United, this achievement was remarked greatly as Suphanburi Fc u19 defied the odds and challenged the three-time champions competitively. The club have embarked on an ambitious six-year plan to create teams from Under 13 to Under 18, starting with a new intake of Under 13 players each year. The young players will be based at the Institute of Physical Education, which is next door to the main stadium. In 2016 Suphanburi Football Academy signed a formal partnership with Borussia Dortmund for three years. In this partnership, Borussia Dortmund will be sending world-class coaches to the youth training center in Kanchanapisekwittayalai Suphanburi school, as well as a coach to train the Thai coach.

== Stadium and locations ==
Coordinates	Location	Stadium	Capacity	Year
14°28′27″N 100°05′12″E	Suphanburi	Suphan Buri Provincial Stadium	25,000	2007–2009
14°28′21″N 100°05′17″E	Suphanburi	Suphanburi Sports School Stadium	1,500	2009–2010
14°28′27″N 100°05′12″E	Suphanburi	Suphan Buri Provincial Stadium	25,000	2011–present

== Season by season record ==
Season	League									FA Cup	League Cup	Queen's Cup	Top scorer	
Season	Division	P	W	D	L	F	A	Pts	Pos	FA Cup	League Cup	Queen's Cup	Name	Goals
2006	TPL	22	4	4	14	18	34	16	12th	–	–	–	Thongchai Rathchai	8
2007	TPL	30	9	8	13	37	45	35	13th	–	–	–	Manit Noywech	10
2008	DIV 1	30	11	8	11	48	47	41	7th	–	–	–	Moussa Sylla	17
2009	DIV 1	30	9	6	15	40	50	33	12th	–	–	Knockout; Round	Bancha In-Tho	7
2010	DIV 1	30	5	8	17	31	53	23	15th	R3	R1	–	—N/a	—N/a
2011	DIV 1	34	10	14	10	40	37	44	10th	R2	R3	–	Pichet In-bang	9
2012	DIV 1	34	23	6	5	58	17	75	2nd	QF	R3	–	Pipat Thonkanya	15
2013	TPL	32	14	9	9	40	31	51	4th	R3	R2	–	Dragan Bošković	10
2014	TPL	38	17	8	13	55	49	59	6th	SF	R2	–	Björn Lindemann	18
2015	TPL	34	16	11	7	60	39	59	3rd	R3	R2	–	Sergio van Dijk	14
2016	TL	31	10	8	13	33	35	38	10th	QF	R2	–	Dellatorre	10
2017	T1	34	11	10	13	52	58	43	11th	QF	R1	–	Dellatorre	14
2018	T1	34	11	13	10	43	35	46	10th	R1	R2	–	Rômulo	10
2019	T1	30	7	11	12	29	44	32	14th	R2	R1	–	Cleiton Silva	11
2020–21	T1	30	9	3	18	33	47	30	13th	R3	–	–	Caion; Leandro Assumpção	7
2021–22	T1	30	8	6	16	35	49	30	14th	SF	R1	–	Danilo	11
2022–23	T2	34	16	4	14	36	35	52	6th	R4	QR3	–	Douglas Tardin	13
2023–24	T2	34	12	7	15	36	41	43	10th	R2	QR3	–	Gustavinho	13
2024–25	T2	32	5	7	20	42	72	22	17th	R3	QPR	–	Oege-Sietse van Lingen	14
2025–26	T3 West	20	9	5	6	22	19	32	3rd	Opted out	Opted out		(Iran) Mohammad Ousani	5

Champions	Runners-up	Third place	Promoted	Relegated

- P = Played
- W = Games won
- D = Games drawn
- L = Games lost
- F = Goals for
- A = Goals against
- Pts = Points
- Pos = Final position
- N/A = No answer
- TPL = Thai Premier League
- TL = Thai League 1
- DQ = Disqualified
- QR1 = First Qualifying Round
- QR2 = Second Qualifying Round
- QR3 = Third Qualifying Round
- QR4 = Fourth Qualifying Round
- RInt = Intermediate Round
- R1 = Round 1
- R2 = Round 2
- R3 = Round 3
- R4 = Round 4
- R5 = Round 5
- R6 = Round 6
- GR = Group stage
- QF = Quarter-finals
- SF = Semi-finals
- RU = Runners-up
- S = Shared
- W = Winners

== Players ==
=== First-team squad ===
Below is a list of players playing for Suphanburi as the official website confirms.

Note: Flags indicate national team as defined under FIFA eligibility rules; some limited exceptions apply. Players may hold more than one non-FIFA nationality.

No.	Pos.	Nation	Player
1	GK	THA	Thanongsak Panpipat
6	MF	THA	Naruebet Udsa
7	MF	THA	Kanok Kongsimma
9	FW	IRI	Mohammad Osanikord
10	FW	BRA	Keder Junior
11	MF	THA	Nisofron Padorlee
13	DF	THA	Passakorn Soonthornchuen
14	FW	BRA	Samuel
17	MF	THA	Wongsathon Tamoputasiri
19	DF	THA	Thanakorn Pornrumdet
20	DF	THA	Meechok Marhasaranukun
21	FW	THA	Nattapong Hamontree
25	GK	THA	Supawat Yokakul

No.	Pos.	Nation	Player
26	MF	THA	Nanthiphat Samingnakorn
27	MF	THA	Jakkree U-ta
29	FW	THA	Nattanai Dajaroen
31	DF	THA	Nirut Jumrueansri
33	FW	THA	Nonkrit Sukontawa
35	GK	THA	Ratchaphon Namthong
36	MF	THA	Rapeephat Pudthaisong
37	DF	THA	Pittawat Jeenthai
38	FW	THA	Apiwat Kaewbut
42	GK	THA	Kantaphat Manpati
43	MF	THA	Akarawit Techowongsakul
44	FW	THA	Chaiwat Jenkarnvanich
55	MF	THA	Aisara Chomphutat

=== Out on loan ===
Note: Flags indicate national team as defined under FIFA eligibility rules; some limited exceptions apply. Players may hold more than one non-FIFA nationality.

No.	Pos.	Nation	Player

== Head coaches history ==
Coaches by years (2012–present)

Name	Nat	From	To	Honours
Worrawoot Srimaka	(Thailand)	December 2011	29 October 2012	2012 Thai Division 1 League: Runner-up; Promoted to 2013 Thai Premier League
Phayong Khunnaen	(Thailand)	January 2013	December 2013	
Alexandré Pölking	(Brazil)	2 January 2014	12 May 2014	
Adebayo Gbadebo (Interim)	(Nigeria)	13 May 2014	7 June 2014	
Velizar Popov	(Bulgaria)	8 June 2014	24 November 2014	
Sérgio Farias	(Brazil)	18 December 2014	13 August 2015	
Worrawoot Srimaka (Interim)	(Thailand)	13 August 2015	13 December 2015	2015 Thai Premier League: Third place Qualified to 2016 AFC Champions League qualifying^{1}
Sérgio Alexandre	(Brazil)	6 January 2016	22 March 2016	
Ricardo Rodríguez	(Spain)	22 March 2016	28 June 2016	
Sérgio Farias	(Brazil)	4 July 2016	16 April 2017	
Worrawoot Srimaka (Interim)	(Thailand)	16 April 2017	21 May 2017	
Adebayo Gbadebo	(Nigeria)	22 May 2017	24 June 2018	
Pairoj Borwonwatanadilok	(Thailand)	29 June 2018	11 October 2018	
Totchtawan Sripan	(Thailand)	12 November 2018	2 June 2019	
Adebayo Gbadebo	(Nigeria)	4 June 2019	18 May 2022	
Sataporn Wajakhum	(Thailand)	20 May 2022	4 December 2023	
Sarawut Treephan	(Thailand)	12 December 2023	31 July 2024	
Issara Sritaro	(Thailand)	2 August 2024	15 May 2025	

^{1}Suphanburi qualified to 2016 AFC Champion League Preliminary Round 2 by finishing third place in 2015 Thai Premier League and Buriram United winning 2015 Thai FA Cup. However, Suphanburi was not able to play in the competition because they did not meet the AFC Club licensing criteria. Chonburi replaced them in the continental spot.

== Honours ==
=== Domestic competitions ===
- Provincial League:
  - Champions:(2) 2002, 2004

== See also ==
- Suphanburi F.C. Reserves and Academy
