= 2016 Nakhon Ratchasima Mazda F.C. season =

Nakhon Ratchasima Mazda
2016 season
- Chairman: Suwat Liptapanlop
- Manager: Miloš Joksić
- Stadium: 80th Birthday Stadium, Mueang Nakhon Ratchasima, Nakhon Ratchasima, Thailand
- Thai League: 11th
- Thai FA Cup: Round of 16
- Thai League Cup: Round of 32
- Top goalscorer: League: Marco Tagbajumi (9); All: Marco Tagbajumi (10)
Home colours	Away colours	Third colours

The 2016 season is Nakhon Ratchasima Mazda's 2nd season in the Thai Premier League since 2015.

== Squad ==
Note: Flags indicate national team as defined under FIFA eligibility rules; some limited exceptions apply. Players may hold more than one non-FIFA nationality.

No.	Pos.	Nation	Player
1	GK	THA	Kampol Pathom-attakul
2	DF	THA	Adisak Hantes
3	DF	THA	Naratip Phayuep-Plurk
4	DF	THA	Chalermpong Kerdkaew (captain)
5	DF	JPN	Satoshi Nagano
7	MF	THA	Kittikorn Pangkhuntod
8	MF	THA	Metee Taweekulkarn (Vice-captain)
9	FW	THA	Promphong Kransumrong
10	MF	GER	Björn Lindemann
11	MF	THA	Narakorn Khana
12	FW	THA	Bill Sida
14	MF	ZAM	Noah Chivuta
15	DF	THA	Prathan Mansiri
16	MF	THA	Peerapat Peerakit
17	FW	THA	Chakrit Rawanprakone
18	GK	THA	Saranon Anuin
19	MF	THA	Kasidech Wettayawong (on loan from Muangthong United)

No.	Pos.	Nation	Player
20	FW	THA	Supakit Niamkong
21	MF	THA	Niran Phanthong
22	FW	THA	Chanatphol Sikkamonthol
23	MF	THA	Jongrak Pakdee
24	DF	THA	Dantrai Longjamnong
25	MF	THA	Decha Srangdee
26	MF	THA	Sarawut Sintupan
29	GK	THA	Prapart Kobkaew
30	FW	THA	Malek Yawahab
31	MF	THA	Chainarong Boonkerd
32	DF	THA	Pralong Sawandee
33	FW	NGA	Marco Tagbajumi
34	DF	THA	Kantapol Sompittayanurak
35	DF	THA	Athibordee Atirat
37	DF	THA	Nattapong Sayriya
39	DF	THA	Woradorn Oon-ard

== Foreign Players ==
Note: Flags indicate national team as defined under FIFA eligibility rules; some limited exceptions apply. Players may hold more than one non-FIFA nationality.

No.	Pos.	Nation	Player
5	DF	JPN	Satoshi Nagano
10	MF	GER	Björn Lindemann
14	MF	ZAM	Noah Chivuta
33	FW	NGA	Marco Tagbajumi
40	FW	GHA	Dominic Adiyiah

== Pre-season and friendlies ==
Date	Opponents	H / A	Result F–A	Scorer(s)
16 January 2016	Samut Prakan	H	3–1	Jongrak 12', Lindemann 52' (pen.), Malek 82'
7 February 2016	BBCU	A	1–2	Lindemann 71'

== Thai League ==
Pos	Team	Pld	W	D	L	GF	GA	GD	Pts
9	BEC Tero Sasana	30	12	5	13	42	52	−10	41
10	Suphanburi	31	10	8	13	33	35	−2	38
11	Nakhon Ratchasima	31	10	5	16	30	44	−14	35
12	Pattaya United	31	9	7	15	46	66	−20	34
13	Sisaket	31	8	9	14	41	52	−11	33

Updated to match(es) played on 25 September 2016. Source: Thai League
Rules for classification: 1) points; 2) goal difference; 3) number of goals scored.

Date	Opponents	H / A	Result F–A	Scorers	League position
5 March 2016	SCG Muangthong United	H	0–1		13th
9 March 2016	Chainat Hornbill	A	1–3	Chivuta 78' (pen.)	17th
13 March 2016	BEC Tero Sasana	H	1–0	Nagano 74'	14th
16 March 2016	BBCU	A	4–2	Malek 11', Adiyiah 43', Tagbajumi (2) 85', 90'	8th
30 March 2016	Bangkok Glass	H	1–2	Lindemann 39' (pen.)	11th
2 April 2016	Ratchaburi Mitr Phol	A	0–2		11th
24 April 2016	Chonburi	H	0–0		12th
27 April 2016	Sisaket	A	0–1		13th
30 April 2016	Sukhothai	H	1–3	Katano 17' (o.g.)	14th
7 May 2016	Navy	A	0–1		15th
11 May 2016	Chiangrai United	H	1–4	Tagbajumi 90+4'	16th
14 May 2016	Bangkok United	A	1–2	Chakrit 61'	17th
21 May 2016	Suphanburi	H	0–0		17th
28 May 2016	Buriram United	A	0–1		17th
11 June 2016	Pattaya United	H	1–0	Chanatphol 13'	16th
18 June 2016	Osotspa M-150 Samut Prakan	A	2–1	Athibordee 24', Pralong 37'	15th
22 June 2016	Army United	H	1–0	Lindemann 29' (pen.)	15th
25 June 2016	SCG Muangthong United	A	1–4	Tagbajumi 44'	15th
29 June 2016	Chainat Hornbill	H	1–0	Lindemann 64'	14th
2 July 2016	BEC Tero Sasana	A	1–2	Tagbajumi 83'	15th
9 July 2016	Bangkok Glass	A	1–2	Lindemann 43'	15th
16 July 2016	Ratchaburi Mitr Phol	H	1–0	Chanatphol 60'	15th
20 July 2016	Chonburi	A	1–1	Tagbajumi 59'	15th
24 July 2016	Sisaket	H	1–1	Adiyiah 90+1'	14th
30 July 2016	Sukhothai	A	0–1		15th
7 August 2016	Navy	H	2–1	Lindemann 62' (pen.), Chakrit 81'	13th
14 August 2016	Chiangrai United	A	2–1	Tagbajumi (2) 63', 72'	11th
20 August 2016	Bangkok United	H	1–1	Chakrit 56'	11th
10 September 2016	Suphanburi	A	1–3	Pralong 87'	11th
17 September 2016	Buriram United	H	2–0	Tagbajumi 30', Lindemann 90+3'	11th
25 September 2016	Pattaya NNK United (Note: In mid-2016, Pattaya United change the name to Pattaya NNK United due to their take sponsor.)	A	1–4	Prathan 3'	11th

== Thai FA Cup ==
Chang FA Cup

Date	Opponents	H / A	Result F–A	Scorers	Round
15 June 2016	Bangkok United	A	3–3 (a.e.t.) (5–4p)	Athibordee 32', Promphong (2) 36', 57'	Round of 64
13 July 2016	Nara United	H	2–0	Promphong (2) 29', 39'	Round of 32
3 August 2016	Ratchaburi Mitr Phol	A	1–2 (a.e.t.)	Chakrit 7'	Round of 16

== Thai League Cup ==
Toyota League Cup

Date	Opponents	H / A	Result F–A	Scorers	Round
10 April 2016	Internazionale Pattaya	A	2–0	Supakit 34', Promphong 90'	Round of 64
8 June 2016	Songkhla United	A	1–4	Tagbajumi 25'	Round of 32

== Squad goals statistics ==
No.	Pos.	Name	League	FA Cup	League Cup	Total
1	GK	(Thailand) Kampol Pathom-attakul	0	0	0	0
4	DF	(Thailand) Chalermpong Kerdkaew	0	0	0	0
5	DF	(Japan) Satoshi Nagano	1	0	0	1
7	MF	(Thailand) Kittikorn Pangkhuntod	0	0	0	0
8	MF	(Thailand) Metee Taweekulkarn	0	0	0	0
9	FW	(Thailand) Promphong Kransumrong	0	4	1	5
10	MF	(Germany) Björn Lindemann	6	0	0	6
14	MF	(Zambia) Noah Chivuta	1	0	0	1
15	DF	(Thailand) Prathan Mansiri	1	0	0	1
16	MF	(Thailand) Peerapat Peerakit	0	0	0	0
17	FW	(Thailand) Chakrit Rawanprakone	3	1	0	4
18	GK	(Thailand) Saranon Anuin	0	0	0	0
21	MF	(Thailand) Niran Phanthong	0	0	0	0
22	FW	(Thailand) Chanatphol Sikkamonthol	2	0	0	2
24	MF	(Thailand) Kasidech Wettayawong	0	0	0	0
25	MF	(Thailand) Decha Srangdee	0	0	0	0
26	MF	(Thailand) Sarawut Sintupan	0	0	0	0
29	GK	(Thailand) Prapart Kobkaew	0	0	0	0
30	MF	(Thailand) Decha Sa-ardchom	0	0	0	0
31	MF	(Thailand) Chainarong Boonkerd	0	0	0	0
32	DF	(Thailand) Pralong Sawandee	2	0	0	2
33	FW	(Nigeria) Marco Tagbajumi	9	0	1	10
34	DF	(Thailand) Kantapol Sompittayanurak	0	0	0	0
35	DF	(Thailand) Athibordee Atirat	1	1	0	2
37	DF	(Thailand) Nattapong Sayriya	0	0	0	0
39	DF	(Thailand) Woradorn Oon-ard	0	0	0	0
40	FW	(Ghana) Dominic Adiyiah	2	0	0	2
Out on loan
–	MF	(Thailand) Jongrak Pakdee	0	0	0	0
Left club during season
–	FW	(Thailand) Supakit Niamkong	0	0	1	1
–	MF	(Thailand) Malek Yawahab	1	0	0	1
–	DF	(Thailand) Suriya Kupalang	0	0	0	0
–	DF	(Thailand) Adisak Hantes	0	0	0	0
–	DF	(Thailand) Dantrai Longjamnong	0	0	0	0
–	MF	(Thailand) Narakorn Khana	0	0	0	0
–	MF	(Thailand) Thammachart Nakaphan	0	0	0	0
–	DF	(Thailand) Naratip Phayuep-Plurk	0	0	0	0

== Transfers ==
First Thai footballer's market is opening on 27 December 2015, to 28 January 2016
Second Thai footballer's market is opening on 3 June 2016, to 30 June 2016

=== In ===
Date	Pos.	Name	From
22 December 2015	MF	(Thailand) Bill Sida	(Denmark) IF Skjold Birkerød
27 December 2015	FW	(Thailand) Chanatphol Sikkamonthol	(Thailand) Chiangmai
27 December 2015	MF	(Thailand) Niran Phanthong	(Thailand) Chiangmai
27 December 2015	MF	(Thailand) Sarawut Sintupan	(Thailand) Nakhon Pathom United
27 December 2015	DF	(Thailand) Nattapong Sayriya	(Thailand) Chamchuri United
29 December 2015	FW	(Nigeria) Marco Tagbajumi	(Cyprus) AEL Limassol
31 December 2015	MF	(Thailand) Thammachart Nakaphan	(Thailand) Chamchuri United
5 January 2016	GK	(Thailand) Kampol Pathom-attakul	(Thailand) SCG Muangthong United
5 January 2016	FW	(Thailand) Promphong Kransumrong	(Thailand) Udon Thani
15 January 2016	FW	(Thailand) Chakrit Rawanprakone	(Thailand) TTM
15 January 2016	MF	(Thailand) Jongrak Pakdee	(Thailand) Songkhla United
15 January 2016	DF	(Thailand) Thanaphol Udomlarb	(Thailand) Songkhla United
15 January 2016	DF	(Thailand) Prathan Mansiri	(Thailand) PTT Rayong
15 January 2016	DF	(Thailand) Naratip Phayuep-Plurk	(Thailand) Bangkok
15 January 2016	DF	(Thailand) Kantapol Sompittayanurak	(Thailand) TTM
1 March 2016	MF	(Thailand) Narakorn Khana	(Thailand) Thai Honda Ladkrabang
22 June 2016	MF	(Thailand) Decha Sa-ardchom	(Thailand) PTT Rayong
15 July 2016	MF	(Thailand) Jaturong Chairat	(Thailand) BEC Tero Sasana

=== Out ===
Date	Pos.	Name	To
31 December 2015	DF	(Thailand) Sathaporn Daengsee	(Thailand) Buriram United
5 January 2016	MF	(Thailand) Sarawut Janthapan	(Thailand) Samut Prakan United
5 February 2016	MF	(Thailand) Kraikiat Beadtaku	(Thailand) Chiangmai
15 February 2016	DF	(Thailand) Thanaphol Udomlarb	(Thailand) Grakcu Looktabfah Pathumthani
4 March 2016	FW	(England) Lee Tuck	(Bangladesh) Abahani Limited Dhaka
22 June 2016	FW	(Thailand) Supakit Niamkong	(Thailand) PTT Rayong
24 June 2016	MF	(Thailand) Malek Yawahab	(Thailand) Krabi
28 June 2016	DF	(Thailand) Suriya Kupalang	(Thailand) PTT Rayong
15 July 2016	DF	(Thailand) Adisak Hantes	(Thailand) Chonburi
15 July 2016	DF	(Thailand) Dantrai Longjamnong	(Thailand) Ang Thong
15 July 2016	MF	(Thailand) Narakorn Khana	(Thailand) BBCU
15 July 2016	MF	(Thailand) Thammachart Nakaphan	(Thailand) Army United
15 July 2016	DF	(Thailand) Naratip Phayuep-Plurk	(Thailand) Khon Kaen United
15 July 2016	MF	(Thailand) Bill Sida	(Thailand) Khon Kaen United

=== Loan in ===
Date from	Date to	Pos.	Name	From
3 June 2016	31 December 2016	MF	(Thailand) Kasidech Wettayawong	(Thailand) SCG Muangthong United

=== Loan out ===
Date from	Date to	Pos.	Name	To
25 June 2016	31 December 2016	MF	(Thailand) Jongrak Pakdee	(Thailand) Krabi
