= 2021–22 Nakhon Ratchasima F.C. season =

Nakhon Ratchasima
2021–22 season
- Chairman: Suwat Liptapanlop
- Manager: Teerasak Po-on
- Stadium: 80th Birthday Stadium, Mueang Nakhon Ratchasima, Nakhon Ratchasima, Thailand
- Thai League T1: 9th
- Thai FA Cup: Runner-up
- Thai League Cup: First round (Round of 32)
- Top goalscorer: League: Kwame Karikari (10); All: Kwame Karikari (13)

The 2021–22 season is Nakhon Ratchasima's 7th consecutive seasons in top flight after promoted back from Thai Division 1 in 2014. In this season, Nakhon Ratchasima participated in 3 competitions which consisted of the Thai League, FA Cup, and League Cup.

The season was originally planned to start on 31 July 2021 and to conclude on 21 May 2022. Due to the still ongoing severe situation of the COVID-19 pandemic at the time, FA Thailand decided to postpone the season to start on 13 August 2021 instead. However, as the COVID-19 pandemic was worsening as of 23 July 2021, FA Thailand had decided to postpone the opening day for the second time to start on 3 September 2021.

== Squad ==
As of 10 December 2021

Squad No.	Name	Nationality
Goalkeepers
1	Chainarong Boonkerd	(Thailand)
19	Kiadtisak Chaodon	(Thailand)
36	Tanachai Noorach	(Thailand)
89	Thanaphat Nirandorn	(Thailand)
93	Pisan Dorkmaikaew	(Thailand)
Defenders
2	Noppon Kerdkaew	(Thailand)
3	Woradorn Oon-ard	(Thailand)
4	Chalermpong Kerdkaew (Captain)	(Thailand)
5	Bunyarit Srinam	(Thailand)
15	Abdulhafiz Bueraheng	(Thailand)
23	Charlie Clough	(England)
25	Decha Srangdee (3rd captain)	(Thailand)
27	Thiti Tumporn	(Thailand)
32	Pralong Sawandee	(Thailand)
37	Nattapong Sayriya	(Thailand)
44	Narongsak Laosri	(Thailand)
46	Teerapat Ketsopa	(Thailand)
47	Peerapon Thongruan	(Thailand)
Midfielders
6	Adisak Hantes	(Thailand)
8	Metee Taweekulkarn (Vice-captain)	(Thailand)
13	Dennis Villanueva	(Philippines)
17	Naruphol Ar-romsawa	(Thailand)
21	Dylan De Bruycker	(Philippines) (Belgium)
26	Nonnawat Salard	(Thailand)
29	Nattachai Srisuwan	(Thailand)
59	Romran Rodwinit	(Thailand)
69	Gideon Ndubuna	(Thailand) (Nigeria)
Forwards
9	Kwame Karikari	(Ghana)
10	Shintaro Shimizu	(Japan)
31	Kittisak Roekyamdee	(Thailand)
50	Watcharin Pinairam	(Thailand)
70	Peerames Junhok	(Thailand)
77	Jakkit Niyomsuk	(Thailand)
81	Amadou Ouattara	(Ivory Coast)
Players loaned out / left during season
10	Marco Sahanek	(Austria)
22	Chanatphol Sikkamonthol	(Thailand)
7	Kwabena Appiah	(Australia) (New Zealand) (Ghana)

== Transfer ==
=== Pre-season transfer ===
==== In ====
Position	Player	Transferred from	Ref
DF	(Thailand) Thiti Tumporn	(Thailand) Khon Kaen F.C.	Undisclosed
MF	(Thailand) Nattachai Srisuwan	(Thailand) Chiangmai F.C.	Undisclosed
MF	(Austria) Marco Sahanek	(Austria) Floridsdorfer AC	Undisclosed
FW	(Australia) Kwabena Appiah	(Australia) Western United FC	Undisclosed
GK	(Thailand) Pisan Dorkmaikaew	(Thailand) Uthai Thani F.C.	Undisclosed
FW	(Ghana) Kwame Karikari	(Uzbekistan) FK Turon Yaypan	Undisclosed

==== Loan In ====
Position	Player	Transferred from	Ref

==== Out ====
Position	Player	Transferred To	Ref
MF	(Thailand) Chitchanok Xaysensourinthone	(Thailand) BG Pathum United F.C.	Undisclosed
FW	(Brazil) Dennis Murillo	(Thailand) Chonburi F.C.	Undisclosed
MF	(Israel) Gidi Kanyuk	(Thailand) Chonburi F.C.	Undisclosed
MF	(Thailand) Weerawat Jiraphaksiri	(Thailand) Kasetsart F.C.	Undisclosed
DF	(Thailand) Eakkanut Kongket	(Thailand) PT Prachuap F.C.	Undisclosed
GK	(Thailand) Samuel Cunningham	(Thailand) Lamphun Warrior F.C.	Undisclosed

==== Loan Out ====
Position	Player	Transferred To	Ref
MF	(Thailand) Anon Samakorn	(Thailand) Police Tero F.C.	Season loan
GK	(Thailand) Phatcharaphong Prathumma	(Thailand) Sisaket United F.C.	Season loan

=== Mid-season transfer ===
==== In ====
Position	Player	Transferred from	Ref
DF	(England) Charlie Clough	(Brunei) DPMM FC	Undisclosed
MF	(Philippines) Dylan De Bruycker	(Philippines) Kaya F.C.–Iloilo	Undisclosed
FW	(Japan) Shintaro Shimizu	(Japan) FC Ryukyu	Undisclosed
GK	(Thailand) Kiadtisak Chaodon	(Thailand) Udon Thani F.C.	Undisclosed

==== Loan In ====
Position	Player	Transferred from	Ref

==== Out ====
Position	Player	Transferred To	Ref
MF	(Austria) Marco Sahanek	Unattached	Contract Terminated
MF	(Thailand) Chanatphol Sikkamonthol	Unattached (Note: Later joined Phrae United)	End of contract
FW	(Australia) Kwabena Appiah	Unattached	Contract Terminated
FW	(Thailand) Jakkit Niyomsuk	(Thailand) Rayong F.C.	Undisclosed

==== Loan Out ====
Position	Player	Transferred To	Ref

== Competitions ==
=== Overview ===
Competition	First match	Last match	Starting round	Final position	Record							
Competition	First match	Last match	Starting round	Final position	Pld	W	D	L	GF	GA	GD	Win %
Thai League	3 September 2021	4 May 2022	Matchday 1	9th	30	10	7	13	33	47	−14	33.33
FA Cup	27 October 2021	22 May 2022	Final	Runner-up	6	5	0	1	9	3	+6	83.33
League Cup	12 January 2022	12 January 2022	First Round	First Round	1	0	0	1	1	2	−1	0.00
Total					37	15	7	15	43	52	−9	40.54

Last updated: 12 January 2022
Source: Competitions

=== Thai League 1 ===
==== League table ====
Pos	Team	Pld	W	D	L	GF	GA	GD	Pts
7	Chonburi	30	12	8	10	50	40	+10	44
8	Port	30	11	6	13	41	37	+4	39
9	Nakhon Ratchasima	30	10	7	13	33	47	−14	37
10	Khonkaen United	30	10	7	13	30	43	−13	37
11	Police Tero	30	8	13	9	33	39	−6	37

Updated to match(es) played on 4 May 2022. Source: Thai League
Rules for classification: 1) Points; 2) Head-to-head points; 3) Head-to-head goals difference; 4) Head-to-head goals scored; 5) Overall goals difference; 6) Overall goals scored; 7) Fair play points; 8) Play-off without extra time;).

==== Results summary ====
Overall								Home						Away					
Pld	W	D	L	GF	GA	GD	Pts	W	D	L	GF	GA	GD	W	D	L	GF	GA	GD
15	5	4	6	16	21	−5	19	4	2	1	7	4	+3	1	2	5	9	17	−8

==== Results by matchday ====
Matchday	1	2	3	4	5	6	7	8	9	10	11	12	13	14	15	16	17	18	19	20	21	22	23	24	25	26	27	28	29	30
Ground	A	A	H	A	H	A	H	A	H	A	H	H	A	H	A	A	H	H	H	A	H	A	H	A	A	A	H	A	H	H
Result	L	L	W	D	W	D	L	L	W	W	W	D	L	D	L	W	D	W	L	L	L	D	L	D	L	L	W	W	W	L
Position	16	16	11	12	8	7	10	12	8	8	7	8	9	9	10	12	9	9	9	9	11	12	12	12	13	13	12	11	9	9

A = Away; H = Home; W = Win; D = Draw; L = Loss

==== Matches ====
Win Draw Loss

3 September 2021 1	Nongbua Pitchaya	2-0	Nakhon Ratchasima	Nong Bua Lamphu
	Hamilton 39' 43'			Stadium: Pitchaya Stadium; Attendance: 418; Referee: Sahapop Sriboonlue

11 September 2021 2	Leo Chiangrai United	3-2	Nakhon Ratchasima	Chiang Rai
	Bill 45+2' (pen.) 90+9' (pen.); Sivakorn 71'		Abdulhafiz 12'; Sahanek 45+3'	Stadium: Leo Chiangrai Stadium; Attendance: 388; Referee: Noppadet Mangngam

19 September 2021 3	Nakhon Ratchasima	1-0	Police Tero	Nakhon Ratchasima
	Pralong 22'			Stadium: 80th Birthday Stadium; Attendance: 0 Referee: Songkran Bunmeekiart

26 September 2021 4	Chiangmai United	1-1	Nakhon Ratchasima	Chiang Mai
	Boli 25'		Chalermpong 61'	Stadium: 700th Anniversary Stadium; Attendance: 0 Referee: Sahapop Sriboonlue

3 October 2021 5	Nakhon Ratchasima	2-1	Suphanburi	Nakhon Ratchasima
	Sahanek 63' (pen.); Karikari 65'		Ratchanat 7'	Stadium: 80th Birthday Stadium; Attendance: 539; Referee: Torphong Somsing

3 October 2021 6	Khon Kaen United	1-1	Nakhon Ratchasima	Khon Kaen
	Ibson 42'; Alongkorn (red card) 46'		Karikari 86'	Stadium: Khon Kaen Stadium; Attendance: 1,234; Referee: Wiwat Jumpaoon

9 October 2021 7	Nakhon Ratchasima	0-2	True Bangkok United	Nakhon Ratchasima
			Vander 40'; Heberty 90+6'	Stadium: 80th Birthday Stadium; Attendance: 899; Referee: Mongkolchai Pechsri

17 October 2021 8	Buriram United	2-0	Nakhon Ratchasima	Buriram
	Piyaphon Phanichakul 61'; Samuel Rosa 72'; Ratthanakorn (red card) 11'			Stadium: Chang Arena; Attendance: 6,420; Referee: Warintorn Sassadee

23 October 2021 9	Nakhon Ratchasima	1-0	Samut Prakan City	Nakhon Ratchasima
	Ouattara 45+2'		Nopphon (yellow card) 35' (yellow-red card) 71'	Stadium: 80th Birthday Stadium; Attendance: 941; Referee: Panumas Phansamo

30 October 2021 10	PT Prachuap	1-2	Nakhon Ratchasima	Prachuap Khiri Khan
	Willen 62' (pen.)		Pralong 19'; Karikari 88'	Stadium: Sam Ao Stadium; Attendance: 400; Referee: Chaireag Ngam-som

7 November 2021 11	Nakhon Ratchasima	3-1	Port	Nakhon Ratchasima
	Karikari 27' 31' (pen.); Villanueva 64'		Nurul 77'	Stadium: 80th Birthday Stadium; Attendance: 1,840; Referee: Songkran Bunmeekiart

10 November 2021 12	Nakhon Ratchasima	0-0	BG Pathum United	Nakhon Ratchasima
				Stadium: 80th Birthday Stadium; Attendance: 2,876; Referee: Sahapop Sriboonlue

14 November 2021 13	Ratchaburi Mitr Phol	3-2	Nakhon Ratchasima	Ratchaburi
	Langil 30'; Derley 49'; Woodland 79'		Naruphol 58'; Karikari 63'	Stadium: Mitr Phol Stadium; Attendance: 1,224; Referee: Torphong Somsing

20 November 2021 14	Nakhon Ratchasima	0-0	Chonburi	Nakhon Ratchasima
				Stadium: 80th Birthday Stadium; Attendance: 2,944; Referee: Winat Phophat

27 November 2021 15	Muangthong United	4-1	Nakhon Ratchasima	Nonthaburi
	Popp 3' 90'; Korrawit 23'; Poramet 76'		Chalermpong 85'	Stadium: Thunderdome Stadium; Attendance: 2,414; Referee: Noppadet Mangngam

9 January 2022 16	Nakhon Ratchasima	v	Leo Chiangrai United	Nakhon Ratchasima
				Stadium: 80th Birthday Stadium

=== Thai FA Cup ===
==== Matches ====
Win Draw Loss

27 October 2021 First Round	Muangkan United (T2)	0-3	Nakhon Ratchasima (T1)	Kanchanaburi
	Filiposyan (red card) 37'		Nattachai 26'; Villanueva 35'; Karikari 43'	Stadium: Kanchanaburi Province Stadium; Attendance: 551; Referee: Akom Charoensuk

24 November 2021 Second Round	Nakhon Ratchasima (T1)	1-0 (a.e.t.)	Nakhon Pathom United (T2)	Nakhon Ratchasima
	Amirali 109' (o.g.)			Stadium: 80th Birthday Stadium; Attendance: 1,526; Referee: Wiwat Jumpaoon

19 January 2022 Third Round	Nakhon Ratchasima (T1)	3-1	Lampang (T2)	Nakhon Ratchasima
	Karikari 3', 30' (pen.); Nattachai 59'		Deyvison Fernandes de Oliveira 71'	Stadium: 80th Birthday Stadium; Attendance: 1,366; Referee: Songkran Bunmeekiart

16 February 2022 Quarter-final	Uthai Thani (T3)	0–1	Nakhon Ratchasima(T1)	Mueang, Uthai Thani
18:00 (UTC+7)		Report; Highlight	Charlie Clough 87'	Stadium: Uthai Thani Provincial Stadium; Attendance: 856; Referee: Niwat Insa-ard; Assistant referees: Rachain Srichai, Kitisak Pikunngoen; Fourth official: Winat Phophat

18 May 2022 Semi-final	Police Tero (T1)	1–2	Nakhon Ratchasima F.C.	Mueang, Ratchaburi
18:00 (UTC+7)	Arthit Boodjinda 19'	Report; Highlight	Kwame Karikari 45+2'; Nattachai Srisuwan 52'	Stadium: Mitr Phol Stadium; Attendance: 663; Referee: Mongkolchai Pechsri; Assistant referees: Pattarapong Kijsathit, Apichit Nophuan; Fourth official: Niwat Insa-ard

===== Final =====
22 May 2022 Final	Buriram United (T1)	1–0 (a.e.t.)	Nakhon Ratchasima Mazda (T1)	Khlong Luang, Pathum Thani
18:00 (UTC+7)	Jonathan Bolingi 115'	Report; Highlight; Full match Ceremony		Stadium: Thammasat Stadium; Attendance: 7,734; Referee: Wiwat Jumpaoon; Assistant referees: Chotrawee Tongduang, Worapong Prasartsri; Fourth official: Kotchapoom Meesridaecha

=== Thai League Cup ===
==== Matches ====
Win Draw Loss

12 January 2022 First Round	Chainat Hornbill (T2)	2-1	Nakhon Ratchasima (T1)	Chai Nat
	Akkarapol 45+2'; Badar 75'		Chalermpong 57'	Stadium: Khao Plong Stadium; Attendance: 2,021; Referee: Noppadet Mangngam

== Team statistics ==
=== Appearances and goals ===
As of 12 January 2022

No.	Pos.	Player	League		FA Cup		League Cup		Total	
No.	Pos.	Player	Apps.	Goals	Apps.	Goals	Apps.	Goals	Apps.	Goals
1	GK	(Thailand) Chainarong Boonkerd	0	0	0	0	0	0	0	0
2	DF	(Thailand) Noppon Kerdkaew	0+3	0	0+1	0	0	0	0+4	0
3	DF	(Thailand) Woradorn Oon-ard	0+4	0	0+2	0	0	0	0+6	0
4	DF	(Thailand) Chalermpong Kerdkaew	15	2	2	0	1	1	18	3
5	DF	(Thailand) Bunyarit Srinam	0+1	0	0+1	0	0	0	0+2	0
6	MF	(Thailand) Adisak Hantes	3+8	0	2	0	1	0	6+8	0
8	MF	(Thailand) Metee Taweekulkarn	5+6	0	1+1	0	0	0	6+7	0
9	FW	(Ghana) Kwame Karikari	12+2	6	2	1	1	0	15+2	7
10	FW	(Japan) Shintaro Shimizu	0	0	0	0	1	0	1	0
13	MF	(Philippines) Dennis Villanueva	13+1	1	2	1	0	0	15+1	2
15	DF	(Thailand) Abdulhafiz Bueraheng	10+5	1	1	0	1	0	12+5	1
17	MF	(Thailand) Naruphol Ar-romsawa	13+1	1	1	0	1	0	15+1	1
19	GK	(Thailand) Kiadtisak Chaodon	0	0	0	0	1	0	1	0
21	MF	(Philippines) Dylan De Bruycker	0	0	0	0	1	0	1	0
23	DF	(England) Charlie Clough	0	0	0	0	1	0	1	0
25	DF	(Thailand) Decha Srangdee	4+7	0	2	0	0+1	0	6+8	0
26	MF	(Thailand) Nonnawat Salard	0+2	0	0	0	0	0	0+2	0
27	DF	(Thailand) Thiti Tumporn	11+3	0	0+1	1	0	0	12+4	0
29	MF	(Thailand) Nattachai Srisuwan	2+4	0	1	1	0+1	0	3+5	1
31	FW	(Thailand) Kittisak Roekyamdee	0	0	0+1	0	0+1	0	0+2	0
32	DF	(Thailand) Pralong Sawandee	12+2	2	0	0	0+1	0	12+3	2
36	GK	(Thailand) Tanachai Noorach	10	0	1	0	0	0	11	0
37	DF	(Thailand) Nattapong Sayriya	15	0	2	0	1	0	18	0
39	GK	(Thailand) Pisan Dorkmaikaew	5+1	0	1	0	0	0	6+1	0
44	DF	(Thailand) Narongsak Laosri	0	0	0	0	0	0	0	0
46	DF	(Thailand) Teerapat Ketsopa	0	0	0	0	0	0	0	0
47	DF	(Thailand) Peerapon Thongruan	0	0	0	0	0	0	0	0
50	FW	(Thailand) Watcharin Pinairam	0+2	0	0+1	0	0	0	0+3	0
59	MF	(Thailand) Romran Rodwinit	0+3	0	1	0	0+1	0	1+4	0
69	MF	(Thailand) Gideon Ndubuna	0+3	0	0+2	0	0	0	0+5	0
70	FW	(Thailand) Peerames Junhok	0	0	0	0	0	0	0	0
77	FW	(Thailand) Jakkit Niyomsuk	2+3	0	0+1	0	0	0	2+4	0
81	FW	(Ivory Coast) Amadou Ouattara	14+1	1	1	0	0	0	15+1	1
89	GK	(Thailand) Thanaphat Nirandorn	0	0	0	0	0	0	0	0
Players loaned out / left during season
10	MF	(Austria) Marco Sahanek	10+1	2	0	0	0	0	10+1	2
22	MF	(Thailand) Chanatphol Sikkamonthol	0+1	0	0	0	0	0	0+1	0
7	FW	(Australia) Kwabena Appiah	9+5	0	2	0	0	0	11+5	0

== Overall summary ==
=== Season summary ===
Games played	18 (15 Thai League, 2 FA Cup, 1 League Cup)
Games won	7 (5 Thai League, 2 FA Cup, 0 League Cup)
Games drawn	4 (4 Thai League, 0 FA Cup, 0 League Cup)
Games lost	7 (6 Thai League, 0 FA Cup, 1 League Cup)
Goals scored	21 (16 Thai League, 4 FA Cup, 1 League Cup)
Goals conceded	23 (21 Thai League, 0 FA Cup, 2 League Cup)
Goal difference	-2
Clean sheets	6 (4 Thai League, 2 FA Cup, 0 League Cup)
Best result	3-0 vs Muangkan United (27 October 21)
Worst result	1-4 vs Muangthong United (27 November 21)
Most appearances	2 players (18)
Top scorer	Kwame Karikari (7)
Points	19

=== Score overview ===
Opposition	Home score	Away score	Double
BG Pathum United	0-0		No
Buriram United		2-0	No
Chiangmai United		1-1	No
Chonburi	0-0		No
Khon Kaen United		1-1	No
Leo Chiangrai United		3-2	No
Muangthong United		4-1	No
Nongbua Pitchaya		2-0	No
Police Tero	1-0		
Port	3-1		
PT Prachuap		1-2	
Ratchaburi Mitr Phol		3-2	No
Samut Prakan City	1-0		
Suphanburi	2-1		
True Bangkok United	0-2		No
