= 2022 Thai FA Cup final =

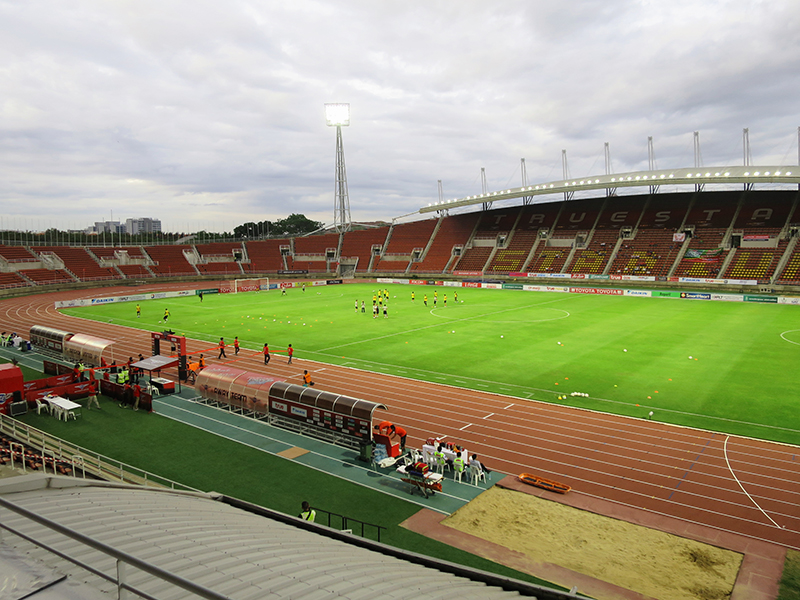
- The match took place at Thammasat Stadium.
- Event: 2021–22 Thai FA Cup
| Buriram United | Nakhon Ratchasima Mazda |
| 1 | 0 |
- After extra time
- Date: 22 May 2022
- Venue: Thammasat Stadium, Khlong Luang, Pathum Thani
- Man of the Match: Supachok Sarachat
- Referee: Wiwat Jumpaoon (Thailand)
- Attendance: 7,734
- Weather: Fair; 28 °C (82 °F) humidity 83%

The 2022 Thai FA Cup final was the final match of the 2021–22 Thai FA Cup, the 28th season of a Thailand's football tournament organised by Football Association of Thailand. It was played at the Thammasat Stadium in Pathum Thani, Thailand on 22 May 2022, between Buriram United a big team from Buriram and Nakhon Ratchasima Mazda a big team from Nakhon Ratchasima, both are located in the Northeastern part of Thailand.

== Route to the final ==
| Buriram United (T1) | | | Round | Nakhon Ratchasima Mazda (T1) | | |
|---|---|---|---|---|---|---|
| Opponent | Result | | Knockout 1 leg | Opponent | Result | |
| Phrae United (T2) | 3–0 (A) | Highlight | Round of 64 | Muangkan United (T2) | 3–0 (A) | Highlight |
| Prime Bangkok (T3) | 5–0 (H) | Highlight | Round of 32 | Nakhon Pathom United (T2) | 1–0 (a.e.t.) (H) | Highlight |
| Chiangrai United (T1) | 4–1 (H) | Highlight | Round of 16 | Lampang (T2) | 3–1 (H) | Highlight |
| Nongbua Pitchaya (T1) | 4–1 (H) | Highlight | Quarter-finals | Uthai Thani (T3) | 1–0 (A) | Highlight |
| Suphanburi (T1) | 3–2 (N) | Highlight | Semi-finals | Police Tero (T1) | 2–1 (N) | Highlight |

Note: In all results below, the score of the finalist is given first (H: home; A: away; T1: Clubs from Thai League 1; T2: Clubs from Thai League 2; T3: Clubs from Thai League 3.

== Match ==
=== Details ===
22 May 2022
18:00 UTC+7

| Buriram United | 1–0 (a.e.t.) | Nakhon Ratchasima Mazda |
|---|---|---|
| Jonathan Bolingi 115' | Report; Highlight; Full match Ceremony |

Thammasat Stadium,
Khlong Luang, Pathum Thani
Attendance: 7,734
Referee: Wiwat Jumpaoon (Thailand)

| Buriram United | Nakhon Ratchasima Mazda |

Lineups:
| GK | 1 | (Thailand) Siwarak Tedsungnoen (c) |
| RB | 8 | (Thailand) Ratthanakorn Maikami | | | (substituted off) 84' |
| CB | 3 | (Thailand) Pansa Hemviboon |
| CB | 22 | (Iraq) Rebin Sulaka | | (yellow card) 96' |
| LB | 2 | (Thailand) Sasalak Haiprakhon |
| DM | 10 | (Thailand) Jakkaphan Kaewprom | | | (substituted off) 91' |
| DM | 55 | (Thailand) Theerathon Bunmathan |
| RM | 7 | (Brazil) Maicon | | | (substituted off) 120+2' |
| AM | 19 | (Thailand) Supachok Sarachat |
| LM | 40 | (Kenya) Ayub Masika | | | (substituted off) 68' |
| CF | 99 | (Democratic Republic of the Congo) Jonathan Bolingi | 115' | (yellow card) 115' |
Substitutes:
| GK | 59 | (Thailand) Nopphon Lakhonphon |
| DF | 4 | (Thailand) Piyaphon Phanichakul |
| DF | 15 | (Thailand) Narubadin Weerawatnodom | | | (substituted on) 84' |
| DF | 18 | (Thailand) Apiwat Ngaolamhin | | | (substituted on) 120+2' |
| MF | 5 | (Thailand) Peeradon Chamratsamee | | | (substituted on) 91' |
| MF | 11 | (Thailand) Chutipol Thongthae |
| MF | 17 | (Thailand) Chakkit Laptrakul |
| FW | 54 | (Thailand) Suphanat Mueanta | | | (substituted on) 68' |
Head Coach:
(Japan) Masatada Ishii

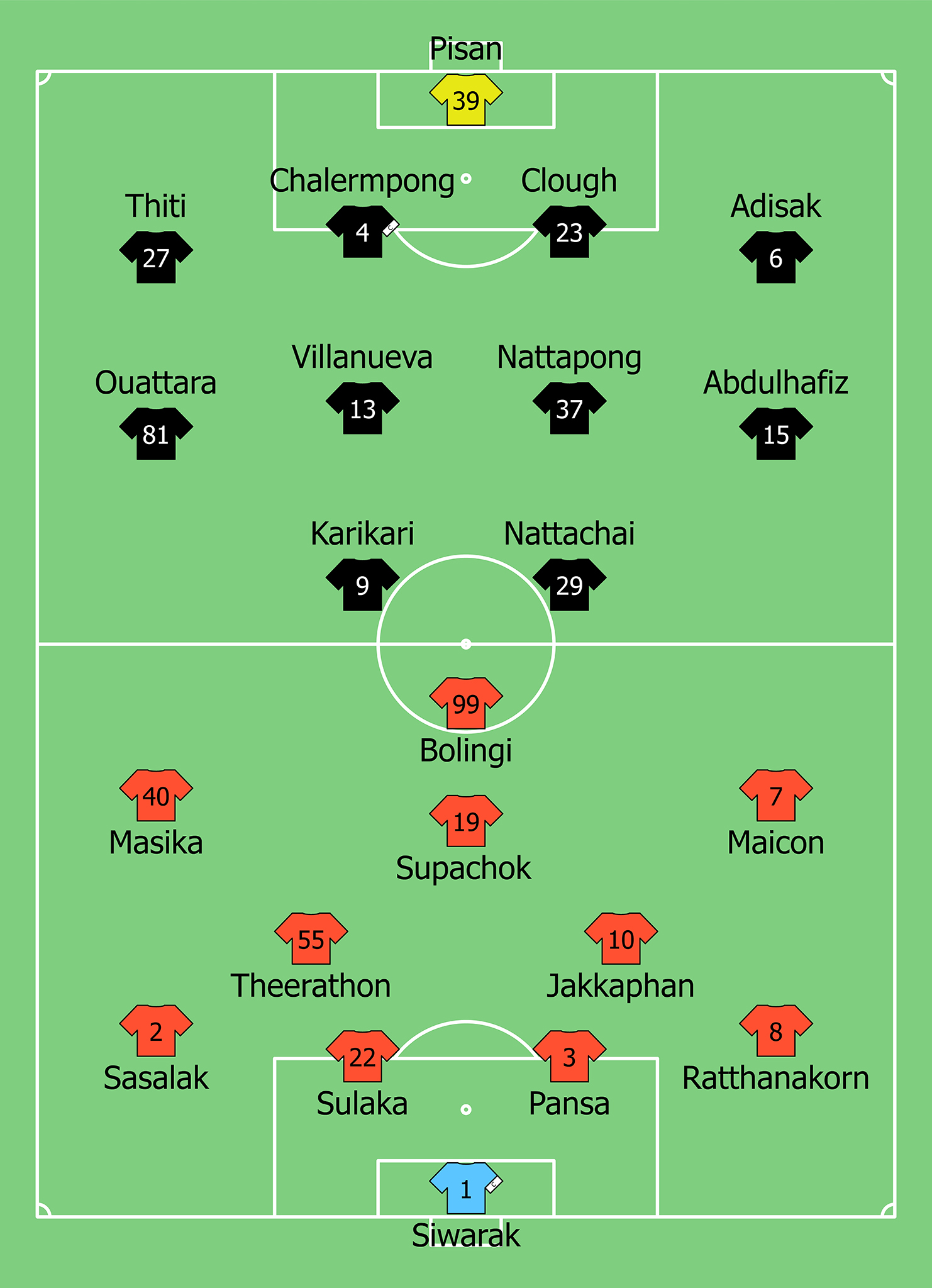

Lineups:
| GK | 39 | (Thailand) Pisan Dorkmaikaew |
| RB | 27 | (Thailand) Thiti Thumporn | (yellow card) 86' |
| CB | 4 | (Thailand) Chalermpong Kerdkaew (c) |
| CB | 23 | (England) Charlie Clough |
| LB | 6 | (Thailand) Adisak Hantes |
| RM | 81 | (Ivory Coast) Amadou Ouattara |
| CM | 13 | (Philippines) Dennis Villanueva | (yellow card) 49' |
| CM | 37 | (Thailand) Nattapong Sayriya | | (substituted off) 112' |
| LM | 15 | (Thailand) Abdulhafiz Bueraheng |
| CF | 9 | (Ghana) Kwame Karikari |
| CF | 29 | (Thailand) Nattachai Srisuwan | | (substituted off) 80' |
Substitutes:
| GK | 19 | (Thailand) Kiadtisak Chaodon |
| DF | 2 | (Thailand) Noppon Kerdkaew |
| DF | 3 | (Thailand) Woradorn Oon-ard |
| DF | 25 | (Thailand) Decha Srangdee |
| DF | 32 | (Thailand) Pralong Sawandee | | | (substituted on) 105' |
| MF | 8 | (Thailand) Metee Taweekulkarn | | (substituted on) 112' |
| MF | 59 | (Thailand) Romran Rodwinit |
| MF | 69 | (Thailand) Gideon Chukwuma Ndububa | | (substituted on) 80' | (substituted off) 105' |
| FW | 50 | (Thailand) Watcharin Pinairam |
Head Coach:
(England) Kevin Blackwell

Assistant referees:
(Thailand) Chotrawee Tongduang
(Thailand) Worapong Prasartsri
Fourth official:
(Thailand) Kotchapoom Meesridaecha
Assistant VAR:
(Thailand) Chaireag Ngam-som
(Thailand) Chaowalit Poonprasit
Match Commissioner:
(Thailand) Aris Kulsawadpakdee
Referee Assessor:
(Thailand) Praew Semaksuk
General Coordinator:
(Thailand) Nuttapon Phaopanus

MATCH RULES

- 90 minutes.
- 30 minutes extra-time if necessary.
- Penalty shoot-out if still necessary.
- Maximum of 5 substitutions.

=== Statistics ===
First half
| Statistic | Buriram United | Nakhon Ratchasima Mazda |
|---|---|---|
| Goals scored | 0 | 0 |
| Total shots | 6 | 0 |
| Shots on target | 1 | 0 |
| Saves | 0 | 1 |
| Ball possession | 77% | 23% |
| Total passes | 319 | 82 |
| Corner kicks | 7 | 0 |
| Fouls committed | 5 | 6 |
| Offsides | 2 | 1 |
| Yellow cards | 0 | 0 |
| Red cards | 0 | 0 |

Second half and extra time
| Statistic | Buriram United | Nakhon Ratchasima Mazda |
|---|---|---|
| Goals scored | 1 | 0 |
| Total shots | 23 | 1 |
| Shots on target | 6 | 1 |
| Saves | 1 | 5 |
| Ball possession | 78% | 22% |
| Total passes | 410 | 127 |
| Corner kicks | 14 | 0 |
| Fouls committed | 9 | 10 |
| Offsides | 4 | 0 |
| Yellow cards | 2 | 2 |
| Red cards | 0 | 0 |

Overall
| Statistic | Buriram United | Nakhon Ratchasima Mazda |
|---|---|---|
| Goals scored | 1 | 0 |
| Total shots | 29 | 1 |
| Shots on target | 7 | 1 |
| Saves | 1 | 6 |
| Ball possession | 78% | 22% |
| Total passes | 729 | 209 |
| Corner kicks | 21 | 0 |
| Fouls committed | 14 | 16 |
| Offsides | 6 | 1 |
| Yellow cards | 2 | 2 |
| Red cards | 0 | 0 |

== Winner ==
2021–22 Thai FA Cup
Winners
Buriram United
Fifth Title

=== Prizes for winner ===
- A champion trophy.
- 5,000,000 THB prize money.
- Qualification to 2023–24 AFC Champions League Play-offs.
- Qualification to 2022 Thailand Champions Cup.

=== Prizes for runners-up ===
- 1,000,000 THB prize money.

== See also ==
- 2021–22 Thai League 1
- 2021–22 Thai League 2
- 2021–22 Thai League 3
- 2021–22 Thai FA Cup
- 2021–22 Thai League Cup
- 2021 Thailand Champions Cup
