= 2018 AFF Championship Group B =

Group B was one of the two groups of the 2018 AFF Championship. It consisted of Thailand, Indonesia, the Philippines, Singapore and qualification round winners Timor-Leste. The matches were played from 9 to 25 November 2018.

== Teams ==
Draw position	Team	Appearance	Previous best performance	FIFA World Rankings (as of 25 October)
B1	Thailand	12th	Winners (1996, 2000, 2002, 2014, 2016)	121
B2	Indonesia	12th	Runners-up (2000, 2002, 2004, 2010, 2016)	160
B3	Philippines	11th	Semi-finalists (2010, 2012, 2014)	116
B4	Singapore	12th	Winners (1998, 2004, 2007, 2012)	165
QFW	Timor-Leste	2nd	Group stage (2004)	191

== Group standings ==
Pos	Team	Pld	W	D	L	GF	GA	GD	Pts	Qualification
1	Thailand	4	3	1	0	15	3	+12	10	Knockout phase
2	Philippines	4	2	2	0	5	3	+2	8	Knockout phase
3	Singapore	4	2	0	2	7	5	+2	6	
4	Indonesia	4	1	1	2	5	6	−1	4	
5	Timor-Leste	4	0	0	4	4	19	−15	0	

Source: AFF

In the semi-finals:

- Thailand advanced to play against Malaysia (runners-up of Group A).
- Philippines advanced to play against Vietnam (winners of Group A).

== Matches ==
=== Singapore vs Indonesia ===
9 November 2018
20:00 UTC+8

Singapore	1–0	Indonesia
Hariss 37'	Report (AFFSZ); Report (AFF)

National Stadium, Kallang
Attendance: 30,783
Referee: Nguyễn Hiền Triết (Vietnam)

Singapore	Indonesia

GK	18	Hassan Sunny
RB	7	Zulqarnaen Suzliman	(yellow card) 54'
CB	16	Irfan Fandi
CB	21	Safuwan Baharudin
LB	2	Shakir Hamzah		(substituted off) 86'
RM	11	Yasir Hanapi
CM	14	Hariss Harun (c)
CM	13	Izzdin Shafiq
LM	22	Gabriel Quak		(substituted off) 77'
SS	10	Faris Ramli
CF	20	Ikhsan Fandi		(substituted off) 90+5'
Substitutions:
MF	27	Adam Swandi		(substituted on) 77'
DF	4	Nazrul Nazari		(substituted on) 86'
FW	19	Khairul Amri		(substituted on) 90+5'
Manager:
Fandi Ahmad

GK	26	Andritany Ardhiyasa
RB	2	Putu Gede	(yellow card) 60' (red card) 90+4'
CB	23	Hansamu Yama (c)
CB	15	Ricky Fajrin		(substituted off) 64'
LB	14	Rizky Pora	(yellow card) 8'
DM	4	Zulfiandi
RM	13	Febri Hariyadi
CM	6	Evan Dimas
LM	10	Stefano Lilipaly		(substituted off) 84'
SS	18	Irfan Jaya		(substituted off) 46'
CF	9	Beto Gonçalves
Substitutions:
FW	25	Riko Simanjuntak		(substituted on) 46'
DF	16	Fachrudin Aryanto		(substituted on) 64'
FW	29	Septian David		(substituted on) 84'
Manager:
Bima Sakti

Man of the Match:
Hariss Harun (Singapore)

Assistant referees:
Nguyễn Trung Hậu (Vietnam)
Phạm Mạnh Long (Vietnam)
Fourth official:
Xaypaseuth Phongsanit (Laos)

Overall
Statistics	Singapore	Indonesia
Goals scored	1	0
Total shots	10	5
Shots on target	4	1
Ball possession	38%	62%
Corner kicks	4	3
Fouls committed	24	17
Offsides	1	4
Yellow cards	1	2
Red cards	0	1

=== Timor-Leste vs Thailand ===
9 November 2018
19:00 UTC+7

Timor-Leste	0–7	Thailand
	Report (AFFSZ); Report (AFF)	Adisak 3', 13', 31', 45', 50', 56' (pen.); Supachai 90+1'

Rajamangala Stadium, Bangkok
Attendance: 8,764
Referee: Nazmi Nasaruddin (Malaysia)

Timor-Leste	Thailand

GK	1	Aderito Fernandes	(yellow card) 68' (red card) 73'
RB	14	Adelino Trindade
CB	13	Gumario Moreira	(yellow card) 63'
CB	6	Nataniel Reis
LB	5	Jorge Victor (c)
CM	22	Nelson Viegas		(substituted off) 34'
CM	18	Filomeno Junior
CM	4	Candido Oliveira		(substituted off) 75'
AM	10	Henrique Cruz		(substituted off) 68'
CF	7	Rufino Gama
CF	8	João Pedro
Substitutions:
DF	19	Feliciano Pinheiro		(substituted on) 34'
FW	21	Edit Savio		(substituted on) 68'
GK	20	Fagio Augusto		(substituted on) 75'
Manager:
(Japan) Norio Tsukitate

GK	23	Siwarak Tedsungnoen
RB	13	Philip Roller
CB	20	Manuel Bihr
CB	4	Chalermpong Kerdkaew (c)
LB	24	Korrakot Wiriyaudomsiri
CM	8	Thitipan Puangchan	(substituted off) 82'
CM	17	Tanaboon Kesarat
RW	11	Mongkol Tossakrai	(substituted off) 74'
AM	29	Sanrawat Dechmitr
LW	14	Nurul Sriyankem
CF	9	Adisak Kraisorn	(substituted off) 87'
Substitutions:
FW	2	Chananan Pombuppha	(substituted on) 74'
MF	7	Sumanya Purisai	(substituted on) 82'
FW	22	Supachai Jaided	(substituted on) 87'
Manager:
(Serbia) Milovan Rajevac

Man of the Match:
Adisak Kraisorn (Thailand)

Assistant referees:
Zairul Khalil (Malaysia)
Arif Shamil (Malaysia)
Fourth official:
Souei Vongkham (Laos)

Overall
Statistics	Timor-Leste	Thailand
Goals scored	0	7
Total shots	16	13
Shots on target	8	9
Ball possession	45%	55%
Corner kicks	7	5
Fouls committed	14	6
Offsides	0	2
Yellow cards	2	0
Red cards	1	0

=== Indonesia vs Timor-Leste ===
13 November 2018
19:00 UTC+7

Indonesia	3–1	Timor-Leste
Alfath 61'; Lilipaly 69' (pen.); Beto 82'	Report (AFFSZ); Report (AFF)	Gama 48'

Gelora Bung Karno Stadium, Jakarta
Attendance: 15,138
Referee: Aziz Asimov (Uzbekistan)

Indonesia	Timor-Leste

GK	26	Andritany Ardhiyasa
RB	11	Gavin Kwan Adsit
CB	16	Fachrudin Aryanto
CB	23	Hansamu Yama (c)
LB	3	Alfath Fathier	(yellow card) 75'
CM	8	Muhammad Hargianto
CM	6	Evan Dimas
RW	21	Andik Vermansyah		(substituted off) 90'
AM	29	Septian David		(substituted off) 62'
LW	13	Febri Hariyadi		(substituted off) 56'
CF	9	Beto Gonçalves
Substitutions:
FW	25	Riko Simanjuntak		(substituted on) 56'
FW	10	Stefano Lilipaly		(substituted on) 62'
MF	19	Bayu Pradana		(substituted on) 90'
Manager:
Bima Sakti

GK	20	Fagio Augusto
CB	15	Armindo de Almeida
CB	13	Gumario Moreira	(yellow card) 68'
CB	6	Nataniel Reis (c)		(substituted off) 73'
RWB	19	Feliciano Pinheiro	(yellow card) 45+1'
LWB	3	José Guterres		(substituted off) 84'
CM	14	Adelino Trindade
CM	18	Filomeno Junior
CM	8	João Pedro
CF	7	Rufino Gama	(yellow card) 62'
CF	10	Henrique Cruz		(substituted off) 71'
Substitutions:
FW	21	Edit Savio		(substituted on) 71'
MF	27	José Almeida		(substituted on) 73'
DF	4	Candido Oliveira		(substituted on) 84'
Manager:
(Japan) Norio Tsukitate

Man of the Match:
Andik Vermansyah (Indonesia)

Assistant referees:
Somphavanh Louanglath (Laos)
Kilar Ladsavong (Laos)
Fourth official:
Amdillah Zainuddin (Brunei)

Overall
Statistics	Indonesia	Timor-Leste
Goals scored	3	1
Total shots	18	14
Shots on target	4	5
Ball possession	64%	36%
Corner kicks	7	5
Fouls committed	11	16
Offsides	3	1
Yellow cards	1	3
Red cards	0	0

=== Philippines vs Singapore ===
13 November 2018
20:00 UTC+8

Philippines	1–0	Singapore
Reichelt 78'	Report (AFFSZ); Report (AFF)

Panaad Stadium, Bacolod
Attendance: 4,327
Referee: Suhaizi Shukri (Malaysia)

Philippines	Singapore

GK	1	Neil Etheridge
RB	6	Luke Woodland	(substituted off) 34'
CB	3	Carli de Murga
CB	22	Paul Mulders
LB	21	Martin Steuble
RM	5	Mike Ott	(substituted off) 45'
CM	36	John-Patrick Strauß
CM	8	Manuel Ott
LM	17	Stephan Schröck
CF	29	Patrick Reichelt
CF	10	Phil Younghusband (c)	(substituted off) 90+6'
Substitutions:
DF	11	Daisuke Sato	(substituted on) 34'
MF	23	James Younghusband	(substituted on) 45'
MF	19	Curt Dizon	(substituted on) 90+6'
Manager:
(Sweden) Sven-Göran Eriksson

GK	18	Hassan Sunny
RB	7	Zulqarnaen Suzliman
CB	16	Irfan Fandi		(substituted off) 86'
CB	21	Safuwan Baharudin	(yellow card) 31'
LB	2	Shakir Hamzah
RM	11	Yasir Hanapi	(yellow card) 39'
CM	13	Izzdin Shafiq
CM	14	Hariss Harun (c)
LM	22	Gabriel Quak
SS	10	Faris Ramli
CF	20	Ikhsan Fandi		(substituted off) 67'
Substitutions:
FW	17	Shahril Ishak		(substituted on) 67'	(substituted off) 72'
DF	8	Jacob Mahler		(substituted on) 72'
FW	19	Khairul Amri		(substituted on) 86'
Manager:
Fandi Ahmad

Man of the Match:
Patrick Reichelt (Philippines)

Assistant referees:
Azman Ismail (Malaysia)
Zayar Maung (Myanmar)
Fourth official:
Thant Zin Oo (Myanmar)

Overall
Statistics	Philippines	Singapore
Goals scored	1	0
Total shots	11	7
Shots on target	3	0
Ball possession	62%	38%
Corner kicks	2	3
Fouls committed	15	19
Offsides	2	1
Yellow cards	0	2
Red cards	0	0

=== Timor-Leste vs Philippines ===
17 November 2018
20:00 UTC+8

Timor-Leste	2–3	Philippines
Reis 73' (pen.); João Pedro 75'	Report (AFFSZ); Report (AFF)	P. Younghusband 27'; Steuble 33'; De Murga 68'

Kuala Lumpur Stadium, Kuala Lumpur
Attendance: 312
Referee: Amdillah Zainuddin (Brunei)

Timor-Leste	Philippines

GK	1	Aderito Fernandes
RB	14	Adelino Trindade
CB	12	Nidio Ricky
CB	2	Yohanes Gusmão	(yellow card) 20'
LB	4	Candido Oliveira		(substituted off) 46'
DM	6	Nataniel Reis (c)
RM	16	Domingos Freitas		(substituted off) 68'
CM	18	Filomeno Junior	(yellow card) 32'
LM	22	Nelson Viegas		(substituted off) 84'
SS	8	João Pedro
CF	7	Rufino Gama
Substitutions:
DF	19	Feliciano Pinheiro		(substituted on) 46'
FW	10	Henrique Cruz		(substituted on) 68'
FW	9	Silveiro Garcia		(substituted on) 84'
Manager:
(Japan) Norio Tsukitate

GK	15	Michael Falkesgaard
RB	14	Kevin Ingreso
CB	3	Carli de Murga
CB	22	Paul Mulders	(yellow card) 72'
LB	11	Daisuke Sato
RM	23	James Younghusband		(substituted off) 57'
CM	36	John-Patrick Strauß		(substituted off) 80'
CM	21	Martin Steuble
LM	17	Stephan Schröck	(yellow card) 30'	(substituted off) 40'
CF	10	Phil Younghusband (c)
CF	29	Patrick Reichelt
Substitutions:
MF	7	Iain Ramsay		(substituted on) 40'
MF	19	Curt Dizon		(substituted on) 57'
MF	31	Adam Reed		(substituted on) 80'
Manager:
(Sweden) Sven-Göran Eriksson

Man of the Match:
Carli de Murga (Philippines)

Assistant referees:
Pisal Kimsy (Cambodia)
Ali Faisal Rosli (Brunei)
Fourth official:
Khoun Virak (Cambodia)

Overall
Statistics	Timor-Leste	Philippines
Goals scored	2	3
Total shots	10	19
Shots on target	5	5
Ball possession	33%	67%
Corner kicks	6	8
Fouls committed	16	12
Offsides	1	3
Yellow cards	2	2
Red cards	0	0

=== Thailand vs Indonesia ===
17 November 2018
18:30 UTC+7

Thailand	4–2	Indonesia
Korrakot 38'; Pansa 45+2'; Adisak 65'; Pokklaw 74'	Report (AFFSZ); Report (AFF)	Zulfiandi 29'; Fachrudin 89'

Rajamangala Stadium, Bangkok
Attendance: 37,570
Referee: Amirul Izwan Yaacob (Malaysia)

Thailand	Indonesia

GK	23	Siwarak Tedsungnoen
RB	13	Philip Roller
CB	4	Chalermpong Kerdkaew (c)
CB	6	Pansa Hemviboon
LB	24	Korrakot Wiriyaudomsiri
CM	17	Tanaboon Kesarat	(substituted off) 85'
CM	8	Thitipan Puangchan
RW	11	Mongkol Tossakrai	(substituted off) 46'
AM	29	Sanrawat Dechmitr
LW	14	Nurul Sriyankem	(substituted off) 68'
CF	9	Adisak Kraisorn
Substitutions:
MF	21	Pokklaw Anan	(substituted on) 46'
FW	22	Supachai Jaided	(substituted on) 68'
MF	7	Sumanya Purisai	(substituted on) 85'
Manager:
(Serbia) Milovan Rajevac

GK	12	Awan Setho
RB	2	Putu Gede
CB	16	Fachrudin Aryanto	(yellow card) 60'
CB	23	Hansamu Yama (c)	(yellow card) 45+1'
LB	3	Alfath Fathier
DM	4	Zulfiandi		(substituted off) 75'
RM	21	Andik Vermansyah		(substituted off) 42'
CM	6	Evan Dimas
LM	10	Stefano Lilipaly
SS	25	Riko Simanjuntak
CF	9	Beto Gonçalves		(substituted off) 86'
Substitutions:
FW	13	Febri Hariyadi		(substituted on) 42'
MF	19	Bayu Pradana	(yellow card) 81'	(substituted on) 75'
FW	27	Dedik Setiawan		(substituted on) 86'
Manager:
Bima Sakti

Man of the Match:
Sanrawat Dechmitr (Thailand)

Assistant referees:
Somphavanh Louanglath (Laos)
Win Thiha (Myanmar)
Fourth official:
Myat Thu (Myanmar)

Overall
Statistics	Thailand	Indonesia
Goals scored	4	2
Total shots	16	15
Shots on target	8	8
Ball possession	50%	50%
Corner kicks	8	12
Fouls committed	5	11
Offsides	1	0
Yellow cards	0	3
Red cards	0	0

=== Philippines vs Thailand ===
21 November 2018
19:30 UTC+8

Philippines	1–1	Thailand
Bedic 81'	Report (AFFSZ); Report (AFF)	Supachai 57'

Panaad Stadium, Bacolod
Attendance: 3,522
Referee: Nagor Amir Noor Mohamed (Malaysia)

Philippines	Thailand

GK	15	Michael Falkesgaard
RB	21	Martin Steuble	(yellow card) 26'
CB	3	Carli de Murga
CB	33	Álvaro Silva
LB	25	Stephan Palla		(substituted off) 78'
RM	36	John-Patrick Strauß	(yellow card) 90+3'
CM	8	Manuel Ott
LM	11	Daisuke Sato		(substituted off) 63'
AM	29	Patrick Reichelt
AM	17	Stephan Schröck
CF	10	Phil Younghusband (c)		(substituted off) 89'
Substitutions:
MF	7	Iain Ramsay		(substituted on) 63'
FW	26	Jovin Bedic		(substituted on) 78'
MF	23	James Younghusband		(substituted on) 89'
Manager:
(Sweden) Sven-Göran Eriksson

GK	1	Chatchai Budprom
CB	6	Pansa Hemviboon
CB	17	Tanaboon Kesarat	(yellow card) 25'	(substituted off) 67'
CB	4	Chalermpong Kerdkaew (c)
RWB	13	Philip Roller	(yellow card) 13'
LWB	24	Korrakot Wiriyaudomsiri
CM	21	Pokklaw Anan
CM	8	Thitipan Puangchan	(yellow card) 23'
CM	29	Sanrawat Dechmitr
CF	9	Adisak Kraisorn		(substituted off) 88'
CF	22	Supachai Jaided		(substituted off) 90+2'
Substitutions:
DF	16	Sasalak Haiprakhon		(substituted on) 67'
FW	2	Chananan Pombuppha		(substituted on) 88'
FW	11	Mongkol Tossakrai		(substituted on) 90+2'
Manager:
(Serbia) Milovan Rajevac

Man of the Match:
Jovin Bedic (Philippines)

Assistant referees:
Trương Đức Chiến (Vietnam)
Chi Sopheap (Cambodia)
Fourth official:
Chy Samdy (Cambodia)

Overall
Statistics	Philippines	Thailand
Goals scored	1	1
Total shots	18	6
Shots on target	5	2
Ball possession	59%	41%
Corner kicks	3	5
Fouls committed	19	6
Offsides	2	5
Yellow cards	2	3
Red cards	0	0

=== Singapore vs Timor-Leste ===
21 November 2018
19:30 UTC+8

Singapore	6–1	Timor-Leste
Safuwan 12', 19', 90+2'; Ikhsan 31', 43'; Faris 90'	Report (AFFSZ); Report (AFF)	Gama 13'

National Stadium, Kallang
Attendance: 18,408
Referee: Amirul Izwan Yaacob (Malaysia)

Singapore	Timor-Leste

GK	18	Hassan Sunny
RB	7	Zulqarnaen Suzliman
CB	16	Irfan Fandi
CB	21	Safuwan Baharudin
LB	23	Zulfahmi Arifin
RM	22	Gabriel Quak		(substituted off) 55'
CM	13	Izzdin Shafiq
CM	14	Hariss Harun (c)
LM	2	Shakir Hamzah	(yellow card) 59'
CF	20	Ikhsan Fandi		(substituted off) 90+3'
CF	19	Khairul Amri		(substituted off) 65'
Substitutions:
FW	10	Faris Ramli		(substituted on) 65'
DF	4	Nazrul Nazari		(substituted on) 86'
FW	15	Iqbal Hussain		(substituted on) 90+3'
Manager:
Fandi Ahmad

GK	1	Aderito Fernandes
RB	19	Feliciano Pinheiro
CB	13	Gumario Moreira		(substituted off) 55'
CB	6	Nataniel Reis (c)
LB	3	José Guterres
CM	14	Adelino Trindade
CM	18	Filomeno Junior	(yellow card) 29'
CM	22	Nelson Viegas
AM	7	Rufino Gama
CF	16	Domingos Freitas		(substituted off) 33'
CF	9	Silveiro Garcia		(substituted off) 70'
Substitutions:
MF	23	Osvaldo Belo		(substituted on) 33'
DF	12	Nidio Ricky	(yellow card) 85'	(substituted on) 55'
FW	10	Henrique Cruz		(substituted on) 70'
Manager:
(Japan) Norio Tsukitate

Man of the Match:
Safuwan Baharudin (Singapore)

Assistant referees:
Chit Moe Aye (Myanmar)
Kilar Ladsavong (Laos)
Fourth official:
Fitri Maskon (Malaysia)

Overall
Statistics	Singapore	Timor-Leste
Goals scored	6	1
Total shots	35	6
Shots on target	14	1
Ball possession	58%	42%
Corner kicks	12	2
Fouls committed	17	15
Offsides	3	5
Yellow cards	1	2
Red cards	0	0

=== Thailand vs Singapore ===
25 November 2018
19:00 UTC+7

Thailand	3–0	Singapore
Pansa 13'; Supachai 23'; Adisak 90'	Report (AFFSZ); Report (AFF)

Rajamangala Stadium, Bangkok
Attendance: 29,763
Referee: Ahmed Faisal Al-Ali (Jordan)

Thailand	Singapore

GK	1	Chatchai Budprom
RB	5	Mika Chunuonsee
CB	4	Chalermpong Kerdkaew (c)
CB	6	Pansa Hemviboon
LB	24	Korrakot Wiriyaudomsiri
CM	17	Tanaboon Kesarat
CM	8	Thitipan Puangchan
CM	29	Sanrawat Dechmitr	(substituted off) 90+3'
AM	14	Nurul Sriyankem	(substituted off) 56'
AM	22	Supachai Jaided
CF	9	Adisak Kraisorn	(substituted off) 90+1'
Substitutions:
MF	21	Pokklaw Anan	(substituted on) 56'
DF	13	Philip Roller	(substituted on) 90+1'
FW	25	Pakorn Prempak	(substituted on) 90+3'
Manager:
(Serbia) Milovan Rajevac

GK	18	Hassan Sunny
RB	7	Zulqarnaen Suzliman	(yellow card) 9'	(substituted off) 45'
CB	16	Irfan Fandi
CB	21	Safuwan Baharudin
LB	23	Zulfahmi Arifin	(yellow card) 31'
RM	4	Nazrul Nazari		(substituted off) 79'
CM	13	Izzdin Shafiq	(yellow card) 86'
CM	14	Hariss Harun (c)	(yellow card) 61'
LM	2	Shakir Hamzah
SS	22	Gabriel Quak		(substituted off) 67'
CF	20	Ikhsan Fandi
Substitutions:
FW	10	Faris Ramli		(substituted on) 45'
DF	5	Baihakki Khaizan		(substituted on) 67'
DF	9	Faritz Hameed		(substituted on) 79'
Manager:
Fandi Ahmad

Man of the Match:
Supachai Jaided (Thailand)

Assistant referees:
Trần Liêm Thanh (Vietnam)
Trương Đức Chiến (Vietnam)
Fourth official:
Nguyễn Hiền Triết (Vietnam)

Overall
Statistics	Thailand	Singapore
Goals scored	3	0
Total shots	12	12
Shots on target	8	4
Ball possession	45%	55%
Corner kicks	9	4
Fouls committed	10	19
Offsides	4	0
Yellow cards	0	4
Red cards	0	0

=== Indonesia vs Philippines ===
25 November 2018
19:00 UTC+7

Indonesia	0–0	Philippines
	Report (AFFSZ); Report (AFF)

Gelora Bung Karno Stadium, Jakarta
Attendance: 15,436
Referee: Fu Ming (China PR)

Indonesia	Philippines

GK	26	Andritany Ardhiyasa
RB	2	Putu Gede
CB	16	Fachrudin Aryanto
CB	23	Hansamu Yama (c)	(substituted off) 90'
LB	14	Rizky Pora
DM	4	Zulfiandi
RM	21	Andik Vermansyah	(substituted off) 71'
CM	6	Evan Dimas
LM	10	Stefano Lilipaly
SS	25	Riko Simanjuntak
CF	9	Beto Gonçalves	(substituted off) 82'
Substitutions:
FW	18	Irfan Jaya	(substituted on) 71'
FW	27	Dedik Setiawan	(substituted on) 82'
DF	15	Ricky Fajrin	(substituted on) 90'
Manager:
Bima Sakti

GK	15	Michael Falkesgaard
RB	21	Martin Steuble
CB	3	Carli de Murga
CB	33	Álvaro Silva
LB	11	Daisuke Sato	(yellow card) 58'
RM	29	Patrick Reichelt
CM	36	John-Patrick Strauß
CM	8	Manuel Ott
LM	17	Stephan Schröck		(substituted off) 81'
CF	26	Jovin Bedic		(substituted off) 76'
CF	10	Phil Younghusband (c)		(substituted off) 26'
Substitutions:
MF	23	James Younghusband		(substituted on) 81'
MF	19	Curt Dizon	(yellow card) 32'	(substituted on) 26'
DF	14	Kevin Ingreso		(substituted on) 76'
Manager:
(Sweden) Sven-Göran Eriksson

Man of the Match:
Riko Simanjuntak (Indonesia)

Assistant referees:
Zhou Fei (China PR)
Pisal Kimsy (Cambodia)
Fourth official:
Nagor Amir Noor Mohamed (Malaysia)

Overall
Statistics	Indonesia	Philippines
Goals scored	0	0
Total shots	6	11
Shots on target	0	3
Ball possession	54%	46%
Corner kicks	7	6
Fouls committed	13	9
Offsides	5	1
Yellow cards	0	2
Red cards	0	0
