= Pralong (name) =

Pralong is both a given name and a surname. Notable people with the name include:

- Candide Pralong (born 1990), Swiss skier
- Pralong Sawandee (born 1987), Thai footballer
