= Naratip Phayuep-Plurk =

Thai footballer (born 1990)

Personal information
- Full name: Naratip Phayuep-Plurk
- Date of birth: 29 June 1990 (age 36)
- Place of birth: Thailand
- Position: Defender

Team information
- Current team: MOF Customs United
- Number: 3

Senior career*
Years	Team	Apps	(Gls)
2013–2015	Samutsongkhram	19	(0)
2016	Nakhon Ratchasima	2	(0)
2016	Khon Kaen United		
2017	Nakhon Ratchasima	0	(0)
2017–2019	Krabi		
2020–	MOF Customs United		
- * Club domestic league appearances and goals

Naratip Phayuep-Plurk (Thai: นราธิป พยัพพฤกษ์, born June 29, 1990) is a Thai professional footballer who plays as a defender.
