= 2018 AFF Championship qualification =

Timor-Leste	Brunei
(Timor-Leste)	(Brunei)
3	2
- on aggregate

First leg
Timor-Leste	Brunei
3	1
- Date: 1 September 2018
- Venue: Kuala Lumpur Stadium, Kuala Lumpur, Malaysia
- Referee: Dmitry Mashentsev (Kyrgyzstan)

Second leg
Brunei	Timor-Leste
1	0
- Date: 8 September 2018
- Venue: Hassanal Bolkiah National Stadium, Bandar Seri Begawan, Brunei
- Referee: Mooud Bonyadifard (Iran)

The 2018 AFF Championship qualification tournament was the qualification process for the 2018 AFF Championship, the twelfth edition of the AFF Championship. Brunei and Timor-Leste contested the tenth and final remaining berth for the AFF Championship final tournament in two home-and-away matches. On 7 August 2018, organising committees confirmed the venue where Timor-Leste would play Brunei had been changed due to floodlighting issues. The opening match was held at Kuala Lumpur Stadium, Malaysia, not as per originally planned at National Stadium, Dili.

Timor-Leste advanced to the AFF Championship group stage and were placed in Group B after winning by 3–2 on aggregate from two qualifying matches.

== Venues ==
(Malaysia) Kuala Lumpur	(Brunei) Bandar Seri Begawan
Kuala Lumpur Stadium	Hassanal Bolkiah Stadium
Capacity: 18,000	Capacity: 28,000
2018 AFF Championship qualification is located in Malaysia

== Qualification ==
1 September 2018
20:00 UTC+8

Timor-Leste	3–1	Brunei
Henrique 28', 32'; Garcia 90+2'	Report	Azwan 57'

Kuala Lumpur Stadium, Kuala Lumpur (Malaysia)
Attendance: 261
Referee: Dmitry Mashentsev (Kyrgyzstan)

8 September 2018
20:15 UTC+8

Brunei	1–0	Timor-Leste
Najib 75'	Report

Hassanal Bolkiah Stadium, Bandar Seri Begawan
Attendance: 2,345
Referee: Mooud Bonyadifard (Iran)

Timor-Leste won 3–2 on aggregate.

== Goalscorers ==
2 goals

- (Timor-Leste) Henrique Cruz

1 goal

- (Brunei) Azwan Ali Rahman
- (Brunei) Najib Tarif
- (Timor-Leste) Silveiro Garcia
