= Jongrak Pakdee =

Thai footballer (born 1991)

Personal information
- Full name: Jongrak Pakdee
- Date of birth: 31 October 1991 (age 35)
- Place of birth: Buriram, Thailand
- Height: 1.75 m (5 ft 9 in)
- Position: Midfielder

Team information
- Current team: Udon Thani
- Number: 16

Youth career
- 2008–2011: Ratwinit Bangkaeo School

Senior career*
Years	Team	Apps	(Gls)
2011–2012	Bangkok Glass	3	(0)
2011	→ Phuket (loan)	6	(1)
2013–2014	Bangkok	34	(2)
2015	Songkhla United	10	(0)
2016–2017	Nakhon Ratchasima	3	(0)
2016	→ Krabi (loan)		
2018	Krabi		
2019	Customs United	19	(1)
2020	Lampang	15	(0)
2022–	Udon Thani	0	(0)
2022–	Samut Songkhram	0	(0)
- * Club domestic league appearances and goals

Jongrak Pakdee (Thai: จงรักษ์ ภักดี) is a Thai professional footballer who is currently playing for Lampang in Thai League 2 as a midfielder. He played three times in the Thai Premier League in 2016 for Nakhon Ratchasima.
