= Reuther Moreira =

Brazilian footballer

Personal information
- Date of birth: 30 July 1957 (age 69)
- Place of birth: São Paulo, Brazil
- Position: Goalkeeper

Youth career
- São Paulo

Senior career*
| Years | Team | Apps | (Gls) |
| 1977–1979 | São Paulo | 16 | (0) |
| 1979 | Guarani | | |
| 1980 | Coritiba | | |
| 1980–1981 | Noroeste | | |
| 1981 | Vitória | | |
| 1982 | Goiás | | |
| 1983–1984 | Taubaté | | |
| 1985 | Moto Club | | |
| 1986 | Sampaio Corrêa | | |
| 1986–1987 | Wavre Sports | | |
| 1987–1988 | São José-SP | | |
| 1988 | Vitória de Guimarães | | |
| 1988–1991 | Paços de Ferreira | | |
| 1991 | Remo | | |
| 1991–1992 | Sampaio Corrêa | | |
| 1992 | Rio Preto | | |
| 1993 | Olímpia | | |

Managerial career
- 2011–2012: Sisaket
- 2013: Nakhon Ratchasima
- 2013: Bangkok FC
- 2013: Phitsanulok
- 2014: Phuket Andaman
- 2015–2018: Trat
- 2018–2019: Samut United
- 2020: Trang
- 2021: Ranong United
- 2022: Shan United
- 2022: Udon Thani
- * Club domestic league appearances and goals

Reuther Moreira (born 30 July 1957) is a Brazilian former professional football player and manager who played as a goalkeeper.

== Playing career ==
Revealed in the youth sectors of São Paulo, Reuther played for countless clubs in Brazil. He also played in Portuguese football for Vitória de Guimarães and Paços de Ferreira.

== Managerial career ==
Reuther Moreira established himself as a coach in Thai football in the 2010s, managing several teams across the country, most notably Phuket Andaman in 2014, and Trat F.C. from 2015 to 2018.
