= Supakit Niamkong =

Thai footballer (born 1988)

Personal information
- Full name: Supakit Niamkong
- Date of birth: 9 January 1988 (age 38)
- Place of birth: Trang, Thailand
- Height: 1.82 m (6 ft 0 in)
- Position: Forward

Senior career*
Years	Team	Apps	(Gls)
2013–2015	TOT	51	(8)
2015–2018	Nakhon Ratchasima	24	(0)
2016	→ PTT Rayong (loan)		
2019	Samut Sakhon	29	(8)
2020–2021	MOF Customs United	20	(3)
2021–2025	Pattaya United	78	(9)
- * Club domestic league appearances and goals as of 26 April 2025

Supakit Niamkong (Thai: ศุภกิจ เนียมคง), formerly Phudit, born 9 January 1988, is a Thai professional footballer who plays as a forward.

== Honours ==
=== Club ===
Pattaya Dolphins United

- Thai League 3 Eastern Region: 2022–23
