= Malek Yawahab =

Thai footballer (born 1983)

Personal information
- Full name: Malek Yawahab
- Date of birth: 15 June 1983 (age 43)
- Place of birth: Satun, Thailand
- Height: 1.65 m (5 ft 5 in)
- Positions: Attacking midfielder; forward

Team information
- Current team: Phuket City
- Number: 30

Youth career
- 2000–2003: North Chiang Mai University

Senior career*
Years	Team	Apps	(Gls)
2004–2008	Chiangmai	104	(29)
2009–2010	Chiangrai United	30	(8)
2012	Songkhla	17	(2)
2015–2016	Nakhon Ratchasima	25	(3)
2016	Krabi	13	(3)
2017	Chiangmai	9	(0)
2018–	Phuket City		
- * Club domestic league appearances and goals as of 31 October 2015

Malek Yawahab (Thai: มาเล็ก ยาวาหาบ, born June 15, 1983) is a Thai professional footballer who played as a midfielder.
