= Dantrai Longjamnong =

Thai footballer (born 1990)

Personal information
- Full name: Dantrai Longjamnong
- Date of birth: 7 October 1990 (age 36)
- Place of birth: Surin, Thailand
- Position: Defender

Team information
- Current team: Muangkan United
- Number: 99

Senior career*
Years	Team	Apps	(Gls)
2011	North Bangkok University		
2012	Yasothon		
2013–2016	Nakhon Ratchasima	6	(1)
2016	Angthong		
2017–2018	Deffo		
2020–	Muangkan United		
- * Club domestic league appearances and goals

Dantrai Longjamnong (Thai: แดนไตร ลองจำนงค์, born October 7, 1990) is a Thai professional footballer who plays as a defender for Thai League 3 club Muangkan United.
