= Kuala Lumpur Stadium =

Stadium in Malaysia

Coordinates: 3°06′02″N 101°43′17″E

- KLFA Stadium
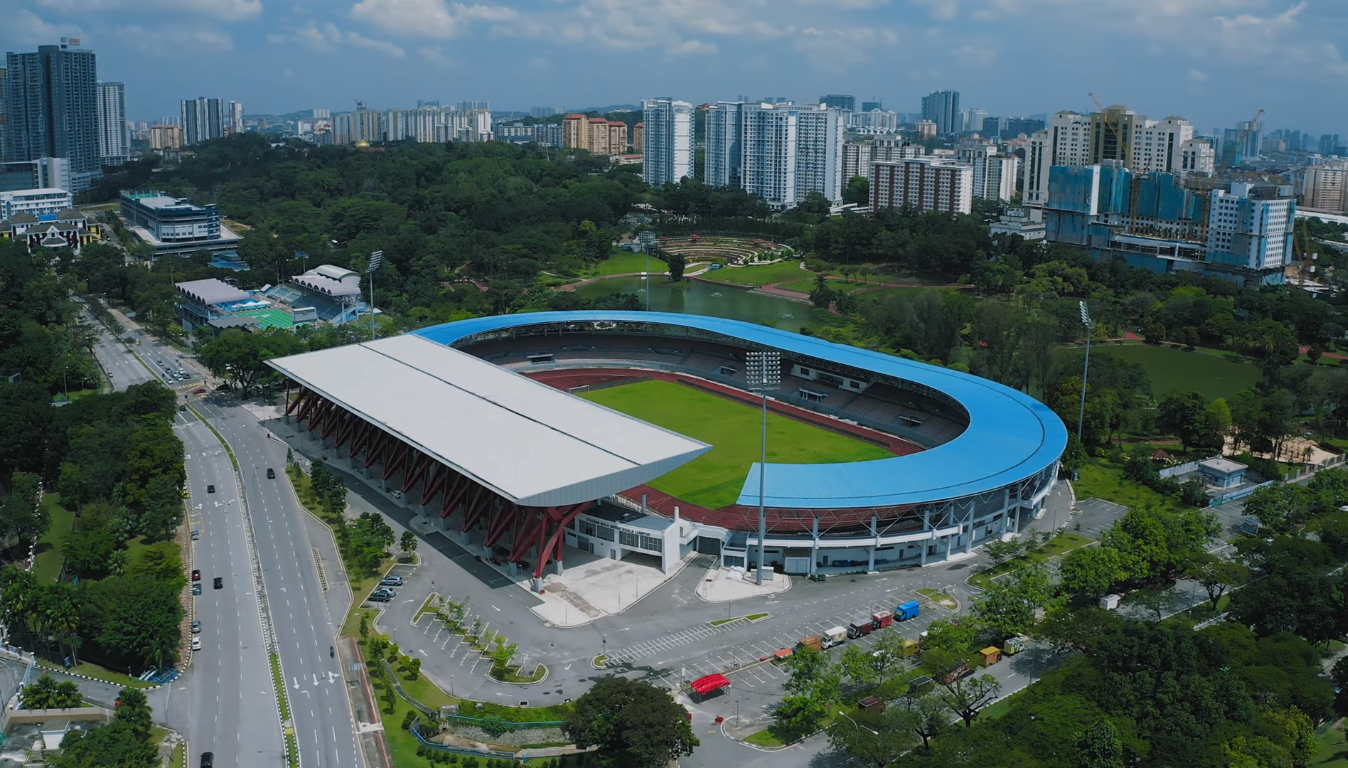
- Interactive map of Kuala Lumpur Stadium
- Former names: Cheras Football Stadium
- Location: Cheras, Bandar Tun Razak, Kuala Lumpur, Malaysia
- Owner: KLFA Corporation
- Capacity: 18,000
- Surface: Cow grass

Construction
- Renovated: 2013–2018

Tenants
- Kuala Lumpur City; Kuala Lumpur Rovers

The Kuala Lumpur Stadium, also KLFA Stadium (Malay: Stadium Bola Sepak Kuala Lumpur), is a multi-purpose stadium in Kuala Lumpur, Malaysia. It is currently used mostly for football matches and is the home stadium of Kuala Lumpur City.

== History ==
In the past, the stadium was used as the home ground of many Malaysian teams, including Felda United, PDRM, PLUS, Selangor and UKM. The stadium was closed in July 2011 due to the City Hall's reluctance to renovate the pitch. Starting in 2012, the stadium has also been used for rugby matches. It was used for the first match of the 2013 Media Prima 6 Regions, between Kelab Rakan Muda Malaysia and Singapore Cricket Club. Between 2013 and 2018, the stadium was renovated; after the renovation, it can accommodate 18,000 spectators.

The stadium also hosted the final of the 2019 AFC Cup between North Korean club April 25 and Lebanese club Al-Ahed.

== International football matches ==
List of international football matches held at the Kuala Lumpur Stadium.

Date	Competition	Team 1	Res.	Team 2
29 December 2004	2004 AFF Championship	Myanmar	3–4	Singapore
21 January 2009	2011 AFC Asian Cup qualification	Malaysia	0–5	United Arab Emirates
12 July 2009	Friendly	Malaysia	4–0	Zimbabwe
11 June 2015	Friendly	South Korea	3–0	United Arab Emirates
5 July 2018	Friendly	Malaysia	1–0	Fiji
1 September 2018	2018 AFF Championship qualification	Timor-Leste	3–1	Brunei
17 November 2018	2018 AFF Championship Group B	Timor-Leste	2–3	Philippines
14 December 2022	Friendly	Malaysia	3–0	Maldives
20 December 2022	2022 AFF Championship Group A	Brunei	0–5	Thailand
26 December 2022	2022 AFF Championship Group A	Brunei	0–7	Indonesia
10 September 2024	2026 FIFA World Cup qualification	Palestine	1–3	Jordan
29 May 2025	Friendly	Malaysia	1–1	Cape Verde
9 June 2026	2026 ASEAN Championship qualification	Timor-Leste	3–1	Brunei
28 July 2026	2026 ASEAN Championship	Malaysia	4–0	Laos
8 August 2026	2026 ASEAN Championship	Malaysia	1–0	Philippines
16 August 2026	2026 ASEAN Championship	Malaysia	0–2	Vietnam
