= Jakkit Niyomsuk =

Thai footballer

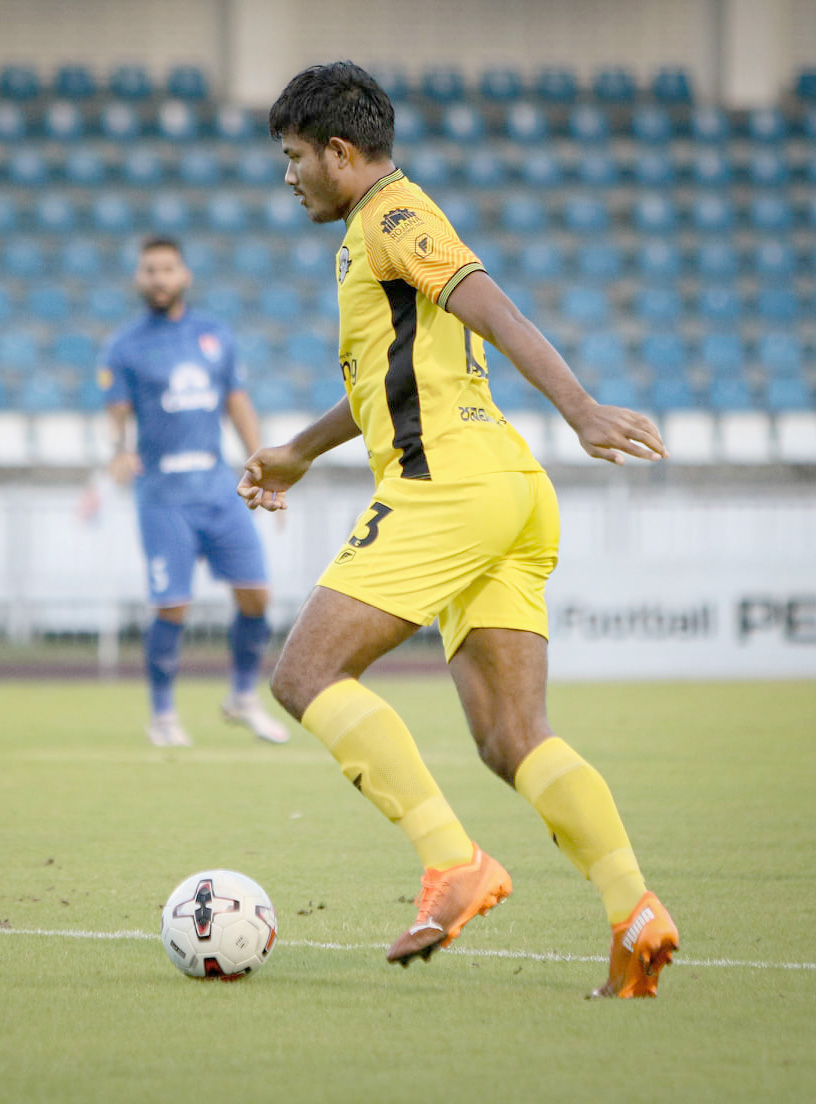

Personal information
- Full name: Jakkit Niyomsuk
- Date of birth: 8 June 1994 (age 32)
- Place of birth: Chachoengsao, Thailand
- Height: 1.83 m (6 ft 0 in)
- Position: Forward

Team information
- Current team: Nakhon Si United
- Number: 37

Senior career*
Years	Team	Apps	(Gls)
2017	Mahasarakham		
2017–2018	Ubon UMT United	19	(1)
2019–2021	Nakhon Ratchasima	32	(2)
2019	→ Sisket (loan)	2	(0)
2020	→ Ayutthaya United (loan)	16	(2)
2022	Rayong	11	(0)
2022–	Nakhon Si United	2	(0)
- * Club domestic league appearances and goals as of 30 April 2023

Jakkit Niyomsuk (Thai: จักรกฤษ นิยมสุข, born June 8, 1994) is a Thai professional footballer who currently plays for Nakhon Si United in the Thai League 2.
