= Prapart Kobkaew =

Thai footballer (born 1984)

Personal information
- Full name: Prapart Kobkaew
- Date of birth: 6 October 1984 (age 42)
- Place of birth: Sa Kaeo, Thailand
- Height: 1.82 m (5 ft 11 1/2 in)
- Position: Goalkeeper

Team information
- Current team: Chiangmai

Youth career
- 2003: Osotspa

Senior career*
Years	Team	Apps	(Gls)
2004–2007	Thailand Tobacco Monopoly		
2007	Raj-Vithi		
2008–2009	I Am Sport (Futsal)		
2011	Lopburi		
2012	Phitsanulok		
2013	Sukhothai		
2014	Sisaket	8	(0)
2015–2016	Nakhon Ratchasima	9	(0)
2017	Super Power Samut Prakan	4	(0)
2018	Jumpasri United	0	(0)
2018–2019	Nakhon Ratchasima	0	(0)
2020–	Chiangmai	0	(0)
- * Club domestic league appearances and goals

Prapart Kobkaew (Thai: ประภาส กอบแก้ว, born October 6, 1984) is a Thai professional footballer.

== Honours ==
=== Club ===
Thailand Tobacco Monopoly

- Thai Premier League Champions (1) : 2004-05
