= Narakorn Khana =

Thai footballer (born 1993)

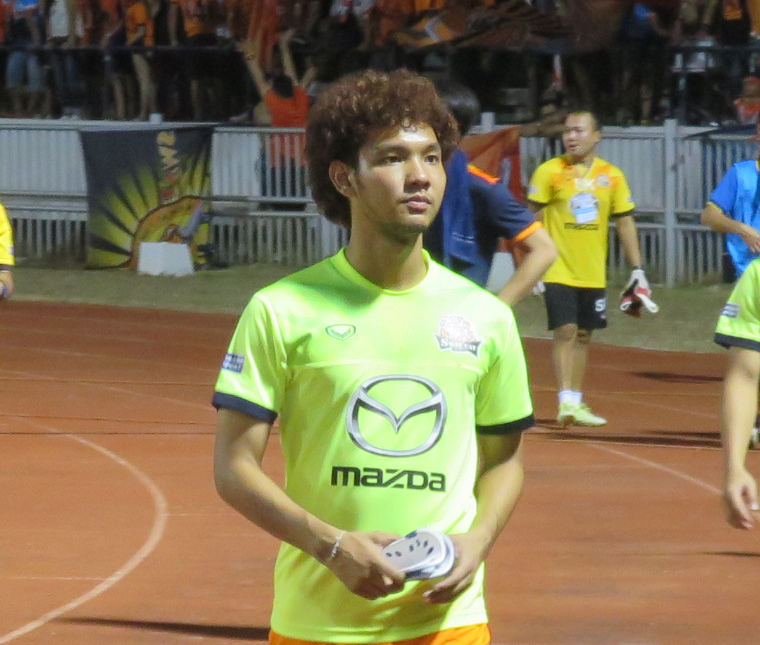

Personal information
- Full name: Narakorn Khana
- Date of birth: 7 April 1993 (age 33)
- Place of birth: Ratchaburi, Thailand
- Height: 1.71 m (5 ft 7 1/2 in)
- Position: Midfielder

Team information
- Current team: Fleet
- Number: 92

Youth career
- 2010–2011: Sriracha

Senior career*
Years	Team	Apps	(Gls)
2012–2013	Sriracha	9	(1)
2014	Pattaya United	17	(3)
2015	Thai Honda	22	(5)
2016	Nakhon Ratchasima	4	(0)
2016–2017	BBCU	8	(2)
2017	Port	0	(0)
2018	Navy	5	(0)
2019	Ubon United	11	(0)
2020–2021	Sisaket	24	(1)
2021–2022	Bankhai United	20	(2)
2022–2025	Pattaya United	76	(7)
2026–	Fleet	0	(0)

International career
2012	Thailand U19	3	(0)
- * Club domestic league appearances and goals as of 26 April 2025

Narakorn Khana (Thai: นรากร คณา, born April 7, 1993) is a Thai professional footballer who currently plays for Thai League 3 club Fleet.

== Honours ==
=== Club ===
Pattaya Dolphins United

- Thai League 3 Eastern Region: 2022–23
