= Suriya Kupalang =

Thai footballer (born 1988)

Personal information
- Full name: Suriya Kupalang
- Date of birth: 21 March 1988 (age 38)
- Place of birth: Nakhon Phanom, Thailand
- Height: 1.76 m (5 ft 9 1/2 in)
- Position: Defender

Team information
- Current team: Samut Sakhon
- Number: 26

Youth career
- Assumption College Thonburi

Senior career*
Years	Team	Apps	(Gls)
2008–2010	Raj Pracha	46	(1)
2011–2015	TOT	78	(0)
2015	Nakhon Ratchasima	1	(0)
2016–2017	Super Power Samut Prakan	4	(0)
2017–	Samut Sakhon	27	(0)
- * Club domestic league appearances and goals

Suriya Kupalang (Thai: สุริยา กุพะลัง, born March 21, 1988) is a Thai professional footballer who plays as a defender for Thai League 2 club Samut Sakhon.

== Honours ==
=== Club ===
Raj Pracha

- Regional League Division 2: 2009
- Regional League Bangkok Area Division: 2009
