= Kraikiat Koonthanazap =

Thai footballer (born 1982)

Personal information
- Full name: Kraikiat Koonthanazap
- Date of birth: 26 January 1982 (age 44)
- Place of birth: Nakhon Ratchasima, Thailand
- Height: 1.78 m (5 ft 10 in)
- Position: Defender

Youth career
- Suphanburi Sports College

Senior career*
Years	Team	Apps	(Gls)
2001–2002	Tobacco Monopoly	24	(2)
2004	BEC Tero Sasana	18	(0)
2004	PEA	16	(1)
2005–2008	Krung Thai Bank	78	(5)
2009	Bangkok Glass	13	(0)
2010	Chanthaburi	12	(0)
2011–2012	Buriram PEA	4	(0)
2012	Chainat	26	(0)
2013–2015	Nakhon Ratchasima	19	(1)
2017–2018	Chiangmai	3	(0)
Total		213	(9)

International career
1998–1999	Thailand U17		
2005	Thailand U23		
2005–2010	Thailand	23	(2)

Managerial career
- 2023–2025: Suranaree Black Cat
- 2025–2026: Korat City
- 2026–: Nakhon Ratchasima
- * Club domestic league appearances and goals as of 10 May 2008

Kraikiat Koonthanazap (Thai: ไกรเกียรติ คูณธนทรัพย์) or in the old name Kraikiat Beadtaku (Thai: ไกรเกียรติ เบียดตะคุ, born January 26, 1982) is a Thai professional football coach and former professional player. He is the currently head coach of Thai League 2 club Nakhon Ratchasima.

== International career ==
Kraikiat played for the Thailand national football team in the 1999 FIFA U-17 World Championship and also played for the senior side in the 2006 FIFA World Cup qualifying rounds.

== Managerial statistics ==
As of match played 22 November 2026

Managerial record by team and tenure
Team	From	To	Record				
Team	From	To	P	W	D	L	Win %
Nakhon Ratchasima	8 June 2026	Present	11	4	4	3	36.4
Total			11	4	4	3	36.4

== Honours ==
=== Club ===
Buriram PEA

- Thai Premier League: 2011
- Thai FA Cup: 2011
- Thai League Cup: 2011

Nakhon Ratchasima

- Thai Division 1 League: 2014

=== International ===
Thailand U-23

- Sea Games Gold Medal: 2005
