= Promphong Kransumrong =

Thai footballer

Personal information
- Full name: Promphong Kransumrong
- Date of birth: 25 September 1985 (age 41)
- Place of birth: Nakhon Ratchasima, Thailand
- Height: 1.75 m (5 ft 9 in)
- Position: Striker

Team information
- Current team: Ubon Ratchathani
- Number: 9

Youth career
- 2006–2009: BEC Tero Sasana

Senior career*
| Years | Team | Apps | (Gls) |
| 2010 | BEC Tero Sasana | 13 | (4) |
| 2011–2012 | Chanthaburi | 38 | (16) |
| 2012 | → Nakhon Ratchasima (loan) | 29 | (16) |
| 2013–2014 | Nakhon Ratchasima | 9 | (2) |
| 2015 | Udon Thani | 27 | (25) |
| 2016–2017 | Nakhon Ratchasima | 8 | (0) |
| 2017 | Lampang | 11 | (1) |
| 2018 | Trang | | |
| 2018– | Ubon Ratchathani | | |
- * Club domestic league appearances and goals as of December 12, 2015

Promphong Kransumrong (Thai พร้อมพงษ์ กรานสำโรง), born September 25, 1985, is a Thai footballer as a striker.
