= Chanatphol Sikkamonthol =

Thai footballer (born 1989)

Personal information
- Date of birth: 2 January 1989 (age 37)
- Place of birth: Nan, Thailand
- Height: 1.65 m (5 ft 5 in)
- Position: Midfielder

Team information
- Current team: Phrae United
- Number: 20

Youth career
- 2005–2009: Chiangmai

Senior career*
Years	Team	Apps	(Gls)
2010–2013	Chiangmai		
2013–2015	Rayong		
2015–2016	Chiangmai	49	(7)
2016–2021	Nakhon Ratchasima	77	(3)
2021–	Phrae United	0	(0)
- * Club domestic league appearances and goals

Chanatphol Sikkamonthol (Thai: ชนัตพล สิกขะมณฑล, born January 2, 1989) is a Thai professional footballer who currently plays for Phrae United in the Thai League 2.
