= Abdulhafiz Bueraheng =

Thai footballer (born 1995)

Personal information
- Full name: Abdulhafiz Bueraheng
- Date of birth: 17 October 1995 (age 31)
- Place of birth: Buke Ta, Narathiwat, Thailand
- Height: 1.70 m (5 ft 7 in)
- Positions: Left back; left winger

Team information
- Current team: Songkhla
- Number: 15

Youth career
- 2012–2014: Nara United

Senior career*
Years	Team	Apps	(Gls)
2015–2016	Nara United	16	(2)
2016–2019	Buriram United	0	(0)
2017–2019	→ PTT Rayong (loan)	28	(0)
2020–2023	Nakhon Ratchasima	74	(4)
2023–2024	Police Tero	19	(0)
2024–2025	Sukhothai	25	(2)
2025–	Songkhla	29	(0)
- * Club domestic league appearances and goals as of 26 May 2024

Abdulhafiz Bueraheng (Thai: อับดุลฮาฟิส บือราเฮง, born 17 October 1995), simply known as Awae (Thai: อาแว), is a Thai professional footballer who plays as a left back or a left winger for Thai League 2 club Songkhla.

== Club career ==
=== Buriram United ===
In May 2016, Bueraheng moved from Nara United in Regional League Division 2 to Buriram United in the second leg of 2016 season.
