= Nattachai Srisuwan =

Thai footballer

Personal information
- Full name: Nattachai Srisuwan
- Date of birth: 3 February 1995 (age 31)
- Place of birth: Saraburi, Thailand
- Height: 1.76 m (5 ft 9 1/2 in)
- Position: Winger

Team information
- Current team: Rajpracha
- Number: 25

Youth career
- 2010–2012: Surasakmontree School

Senior career*
Years	Team	Apps	(Gls)
2013–2014	Phetchaburi		
2015–2016	Samutsongkhram		
2017–2021	BG Pathum United	21	(2)
2019	→ Air Force United (loan)	15	(3)
2020–2021	→ Chiangmai (loan)	29	(9)
2021–2022	Nakhon Ratchasima	21	(1)
2023	Chiangmai United	4	(0)
2023	Nakhon Ratchasima	7	(0)
2024	Chanthaburi	15	(2)
2024–	Rajpracha	0	(0)
- * Club domestic league appearances and goals as of 12 May 2023 (UTC+7)

Nattachai Srisuwan (Thai: ณัฐชัย ศรีสุวรรณ์, born February 3, 1995) is a Thai professional footballer who plays as a midfielder for Thai League 3 club Rajpracha.
