= Björn Lindemann =

German footballer (born 1984)

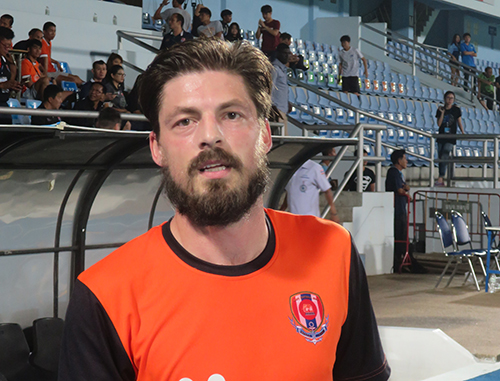
- Lindemann with Navy

Personal information
- Date of birth: 23 January 1984 (age 42)
- Place of birth: Nienburg/Weser, West Germany
- Height: 1.83 m (6 ft 0 in)
- Position: Attacking midfielder

Youth career
- TSV Loccum
- –1998: VfL Münchehagen
- 1998–2003: Hannover 96

Senior career*
Years	Team	Apps	(Gls)
2003–2004	Hannover 96	0	(0)
2004–2006	Holstein Kiel	66	(10)
2006–2007	VfB Lübeck	11	(2)
2007–2008	1. FC Magdeburg	44	(8)
2008–2009	SC Paderborn	34	(4)
2009–2011	VfL Osnabrück	60	(15)
2011–2012	Carl Zeiss Jena	10	(0)
2012–2014	Army United	52	(16)
2014–2015	Suphanburi	34	(18)
2015–2016	Nakhon Ratchasima	58	(13)
2017	Navy	10	(0)
2017	Sisaket	7	(1)
2017–2018	Germania Egestorf	28	(1)
2018–2019	SSV Jeddeloh	19	(2)
Total		433	(90)

Managerial career
- 2021–2022: VfL Münchehagen (player-manager)
- 2022–2023: SSV Jeddeloh
- 2024: JFV Calenberger Land (U-19)
- 2024–2026: SSV Jeddeloh
- 2026–: Kickers Emden
- * Club domestic league appearances and goals

Bjorn Lindemann (23 January 1984) is a German professional football manager and former player.

== Career ==
Lindemann played in the youth for VfL Münchehagen, TSV Loccum and Hannover 96 II. From 2004 to 2006 he played for Holstein Kiel in the Regionalliga Nord. For the 2006–07 season, he moved to VfB Lübeck, where he played half a year. In the winter break, he joined 1. FC Magdeburg. In the summer of 2008, he moved to SC Paderborn 07. After a good first round, his performance dropped in the second half of the season so his contract was dissolved after the promotion of Paderborn in summer 2009.

Lindemann then transferred to VfL Osnabrück who were relegated from the 2. Bundesliga to the 3. Liga. Contributing eleven goals and twelve assists in the 2009–10 season he played a significant part in the promotion of Osnabrück to the 2. Bundesliga. In April 2011 he, along with Kevin Schöneberg, was suspended for appearing to training under the influence of alcohol.

On 28 January 2012, Lindemann signed with Thai side Army United F.C.

In September 2017, Lindemann returned to Germany, joining fourth-tier side 1. FC Germania Egestorf/Langreder from Sisaket.

In February 2019, Lindemann left SSV Jeddeloh after seven months by mutual consent.

In May 2020, it was reported that Lindemann had retired from playing.

== Honours ==
VfL Osnabrück

- 3. Liga: 2009–10

Individual

- 3. Liga player of the year: 2009–10
