= Pisan Dorkmaikaew =

Thai footballer

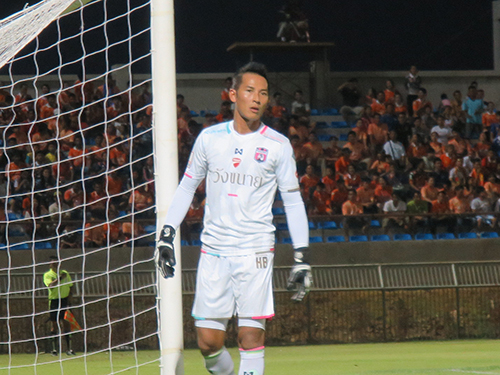

Personal information
- Full name: Pisan Dorkmaikaew
- Date of birth: 10 May 1984 (age 42)
- Place of birth: Suphan Buri, Thailand
- Height: 1.86 m (6 ft 1 in)
- Position: Goalkeeper

Youth career
- 2000–2002: Talingchan Wittaya School

Senior career*
Years	Team	Apps	(Gls)
2005–2006	Nakhon Pathom	0	(0)
2007	Suphanburi	18	(0)
2008–2013	BEC Tero Sasana	111	(0)
2014–2016	Bangkok United	15	(0)
2015	→ Saraburi (loan)	28	(0)
2016	→ Chainat Hornbill (loan)	23	(0)
2017–2018	Bangkok Glass	19	(0)
2018–2019	Air Force United	30	(0)
2020	MOF Customs United	17	(0)
2021	Uthai Thani	15	(0)
2021–2023	Nakhon Ratchasima	50	(0)
2023	PT Prachuap	7	(0)
2024–2026	BG Pathum United	14	(0)
- * Club domestic league appearances and goals as of 5 November 2023

Pisan Dorkmaikaew (Thai: พิศาล ดอกไม้แก้ว, born May 5, 1984), is a Thai professional footballer who plays as a goalkeeper for BG Pathum United.

== Career ==
On behalf of the Thailand national football team, Winfried Schäfer was called Pisan to the national team in 2011 before being renamed as a part of the team again in the Milovan Rajevac in 2019 but he never play in any official match with this two called.

In February 2020, Dorkmaikaew announced his retirement from professional football, after a spell with Air Force United. However, later in the same month, he joined MOF Customs United. In December 2020, Dorkmaikaew signed with Thai League 2 club Uthai Thani.

== Honours ==
=== Club ===
BG Pathum United

- Thai League Cup: 2023–24
