= Decha Srangdee =

Thai footballer (born 1990)

Personal information
- Date of birth: 1 September 1990 (age 36)
- Place of birth: Buriram, Thailand
- Height: 1.75 m (5 ft 9 in)
- Position: Left back

Team information
- Current team: Trat
- Number: 93

Senior career*
Years	Team	Apps	(Gls)
2014	PTT Rayong	13	(0)
2015	Chiangrai United	6	(0)
2015–2022	Nakhon Ratchasima	140	(2)
2022–	Trat	6	(0)
- * Club domestic league appearances and goals as of 13 November 2022

Decha Srangdee (Thai: เดชา สร้างดี, born Sep 1, 1990) is a Thai professional footballer who currently plays for Trat in the Thai League T2.
