= Metee Taweekulkarn =

Thai footballer (born 1986)

Personal information
- Full name: Metee Taweekulkarn
- Date of birth: 19 March 1986 (age 40)
- Place of birth: Ranong, Thailand
- Height: 1.83 m (6 ft 0 in)
- Position: Midfielder

Senior career*
Years	Team	Apps	(Gls)
2011–2012	PTT Rayong	16	(0)
2013–2022	Nakhon Ratchasima	165	(11)
Total		181	(11)
- * Club domestic league appearances and goals

Metee Taweekulkarn (Thai: เมธี ทวีกุลกาญจน์, born March 19, 1986) is a retired professional footballer from Thailand. After retired Metee has headed towards a career in politics by a candidate for a party-list election of the Chart Pattana Kla Party, ranked 24th in the 2023 Thai general election.
