= Adisak Hantes =

Thai footballer

Personal information
- Date of birth: 9 February 1992 (age 34)
- Place of birth: Chanthaburi, Thailand
- Height: 1.78 m (5 ft 10 in)
- Position: Left back

Team information
- Current team: Udon Banjan United
- Number: 88

Senior career*
Years	Team	Apps	(Gls)
2012–2014	Pattaya United	14	(0)
2014–2016	Nakhon Ratchasima	13	(1)
2016–2019	Chonburi	1	(0)
2019	PTT Rayong	5	(0)
2020–2022	Nakhon Ratchasima	30	(0)
2022–2023	PT Prachuap	22	(0)
2024	Chiangmai	16	(0)
2024	Nongbua Pitchaya	0	(0)
2025–	Udon Banjan United	0	(0)
- * Club domestic league appearances and goals as of 11 May 2024

Adisak Hantes (Thai: อดิศักดิ์ หาญเทศ; born 13 November 1995) is a Thai professional footballer who plays as a left back for Thai League 1 club Nongbua Pitchaya.
