= Pralong Sawandee =

Thai footballer (born 1987)

Personal information
- Full name: Pralong Sawandee
- Date of birth: 4 June 1987 (age 39)
- Place of birth: Sisaket, Thailand
- Height: 1.70 m (5 ft 7 in)
- Position: Left back

Senior career*
Years	Team	Apps	(Gls)
2008–2011	Sisaket	42	(2)
2012–2022	Nakhon Ratchasima	125	(7)
- * Club domestic league appearances and goals

Pralong Sawandee (Thai: ประลอง สาวันดี, born June 4, 1987) is a Thai professional footballer who plays as a left back.
