= Chalermpong Kerdkaew =

Thai footballer (born 1986)

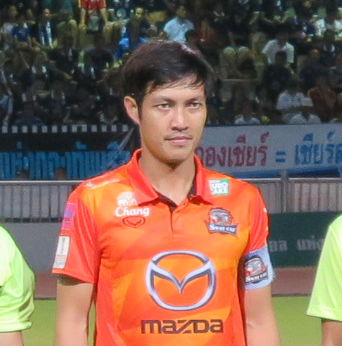

Personal information
- Full name: Chalermpong Kerdkaew
- Date of birth: 7 October 1986 (age 40)
- Place of birth: Lopburi, Thailand
- Height: 1.81 m (5 ft 11 1/2 in)
- Position: Centre-back

Team information
- Current team: Roi Et PB United
- Number: 44

Youth career
- 1999–2004: Pra Narai School
- 2005–2006: Lopburi

Senior career*
Years	Team	Apps	(Gls)
2007	Lopburi	20	(0)
2008–2012	Buriram PEA	6	(0)
2010–2011	→ Buriram (loan)	19	(2)
2013	Chainat Hornbill	22	(0)
2014–2022	Nakhon Ratchasima	192	(3)
2022–2023	Chonburi	27	(1)
2023–2024	Chonburi	14	(0)
2024–2025	Rayong	23	(0)
2025–2026	Roi Et PB United	10	(0)
Total		333	(6)

International career
2017–2019	Thailand	19	(0)
- * Club domestic league appearances and goals as of 02:39, 11 August 2024 (UTC)

Chalermpong Kerdkaew (Thai: เฉลิมพงษ์ เกิดแก้ว, born 7 October 1986), simply known as Ball (Thai: บอล), is a Thai retired professional footballer who plays as a centre-back.

== International career ==
Chalermpong played in the third round of 2018 FIFA World Cup qualification and the 2018 AFF Suzuki Cup. In 2019 he was called up by Milovan Rajevac to be a part of Thailand squad in 2019 AFC Asian Cup.

== Personal life ==
His younger brother, Noppon Kerdkaew, is also a footballer for Nakhon Ratchasima.

== Honours ==
=== International ===
Thailand

- King's Cup (1): 2017

=== Club ===
Buriram United (PEA FC)

- Thai Premier League (1): 2008
- Thai FA Cup (1): 2012
- Thai League Cup (1): 2012

Buriram

- Regional League Division 2 (1): 2010
- Thai Division 1 League (1): 2011

=== Individual ===
- Thai League 1 Best XI: 2020–21
