= Nakhon Ratchasima F.C. =

Association football club in Thailand

Nakhon Ratchasima นครราชสีมา มาสด้า เอฟซี
- Full name: Nakhon Ratchasima Football Club สโมสรฟุตบอลจังหวัดนครราชสีมา
- Nicknames: The Swat Cats (เจ้าแมวพิฆาต)
- Short name: NRC
- Founded: 1999; 27 years ago
- Ground: 80th Birthday Stadium; Nakhon Ratchasima, Thailand
- Capacity: 25,000
- Owner: Mazda Thailand
- Chairman: Wacharapon Tomornsak
- Head coach: Kraikiat Koonthanazap
- League: Thai League 2
- 2025–26: Thai League 1, 15th of 16 (relegated)
- Website: www.swatcatkorat.com
Home colours	Away colours

Nakhon Ratchasima Football Club (Thai สโมสรฟุตบอลจังหวัดนครราชสีมา) (currently known as Nakhon Ratchasima Mazda due to sponsorship reasons), is a Thailand professional football club based in the province of Nakhon Ratchasima, Thailand. They currently compete in the Thai League 1 in the 2025–26 season, following promotion from the 2023–24 Thai League 2 as champions.

The clubs has won two Thai League 2 title in their history.

The club supports 3 other sports teams, Nakhon Ratchasima V-One Futsal Club, Nakhon Ratchasima Men's Volleyball Club, and Nakhon Ratchasima Women's Volleyball Club.

== History ==
=== Beginnings (1999–2008) ===
Nakhon Ratchasima were formed in 1999. After spending fourteen years of their history in Provincial League of the Thai Football League, this big club won promotion to Thai Division 1 League in 2011.

In 2007, despite finishing fourth from bottom in a twelve-team division (in Division 1), 'Nakhon Ratchasima' were relegated to the newly formed third tier of the Thai football pyramid because of league restructuring.

=== The Division Two years ===
In 2008, Nakhon Ratchasima finished fourth in the now defunct Division 2 Group A. Nakhon Ratchasima started the season slowly but embarked on a five-game winning streak in the middle third of the season which gave them a chance of promotion. However, a disappointing run-in meant that Korat eventually finished fourth.

In 2009, Nakhon Ratchasima finished second in the inaugural Division 2 Northeast. Despite leading the division for most of the season, they slipped to second on the final day as they drew 1–1 at home with Nakhon Phanom whilst title rivals Loei City beat Chaiyaphum United 1–0 meaning that Loei took the title and the sole promotion play-offs spot on the final day of the season. Nakhon Ratchasima also reached the quarter-finals of the FA Cup (the only Regional League side to make it to that stage) but lost to TPL side Port.

In 2010, Nakhon Ratchasima finished fourth in the expanded 16-team Northeast Division. Another high finish but they were far behind the top two of Loei and Buriram. Head coach Mann Jantanarm resigned after the 4–0 away defeat to Buriram and was replaced by a member of the backroom staff, Vichan Cha-on Sri. Despite a successful Thai FA Cup run in 2009, the club fell at the first hurdle in the 2010 competition as they lost 2–1 away at Phuket. They were slightly more successful in the relaunched League Cup. Loei City were beaten 3–1 at the 80th Birthday Stadium in the preliminary round. This set up a first round proper clash with TPL side Samut Songkhram to be played over two legs. A good first leg performance saw Nakhon Ratchasima go down just 1–0 to opponents ranked two divisions higher. In the second leg, however, Nakhon Ratchasima lost 7–0 as the class of the opposition finally told.

The 2011 season saw the club more than make up for the disappointment of 2009. Under the guidance of a new president, Phollapee Suwanchawee, and a new coach, Tewet Kamolsin, the team achieved promotion. Midway through the season, the club was docked nine points for fielding an ineligible player (goalkeeper Kiattisak Lertwilai). Despite the deduction, and thanks to the re-signing of Prompong Kransumrong, the side recovered from the penalty and clinched a place in the end-of-season play-offs (the 'Champions League') by defeating Mahasarakham 1–0 on the final day of the season. Nakhon Ratchasima were placed in Group B of the Champions League along with fellow Isaan side Roiet, Rayong, Krabi, Lamphun and North Bangkok. This time, Korat were the beneficiaries of a points deduction. After losing 2–1 to Roiet in their first Champions League match, Nakhon Ratchasima were awarded all three points as Roiet fielded six foreign players – one more than is allowed. Korat went on to win seven, draw one and lose two of their Champions League matches, and finished top of the group on 22 points. As such, promotion to 2012 TPL Division 1 was secured along with runners-up Krabi, and Ratchaburi and Pattalung from Group A.

=== The Division One years and promotion ===
Nakhon Ratchasima's first season back in the second tier ended with an eighth-place finish in 2012. Head coach Tewet Kamolsin was sacked in May 2012 and replaced by Brazilian Reuther Moreira. He too was released by the club after the season finished and was replaced by Arjhan Srong-ngamsub.

In 2014, Japanese head coach Sugao Kambe guided Nakhon Ratchasima to win the 2014 Thai Division 1 League title which is also the club first major honours in their history seeing the club being in the top flight league in the following 2015 season.

In 2022, Englishmen head coach Kevin Blackwell steered Nakhon Ratchasima all the way to the 2022 Thai FA Cup final. The club managed to contain the entire match in a goalless contest against Buriram United, however in the 115th minute, they break the deadlocks and ended up Nakhonratchasima coming out as runner-ups in the cup.

=== Division Two league title ===
Nakhon Ratchasima ended the 2022–23 season in the 14th position thus getting relegated to the Thai League 2. However, in the following season, head coach Teerasak Po-on guided Nakhon Ratchasima to win the 2023–24 Thai League 2 title thus gaining promotion back to the top flight after a season being in the second division after their match against Nongbua Pitchaya ending with a 3–0 victory for Nakhon Ratchasima on 21 April 2023.

== Team image ==
=== Crests history ===
The original club crest was a giant cat or it called in their area as the Korat cat that originating in Thailand, it is named after the Nakhon Ratchasima province (typically called "Korat" by the Thai people. In Thailand, the breed is known as Si-Sawat, meaning "colour of the sawat seed" and this Si-Sawat became a nickname of the club The Swat Cats. The Korat is known colloquially as the "good luck cat". Traditionally, they are given in pairs to newlyweds or people who are highly esteemed, for good luck. Until recently, Korats were not sold, but only given as gifts.

The new badge was approved by board in 2016 and was introduced in the 2017 season. It was designed by Farmgroup a design consultancy based in Bangkok.

== Stadium ==
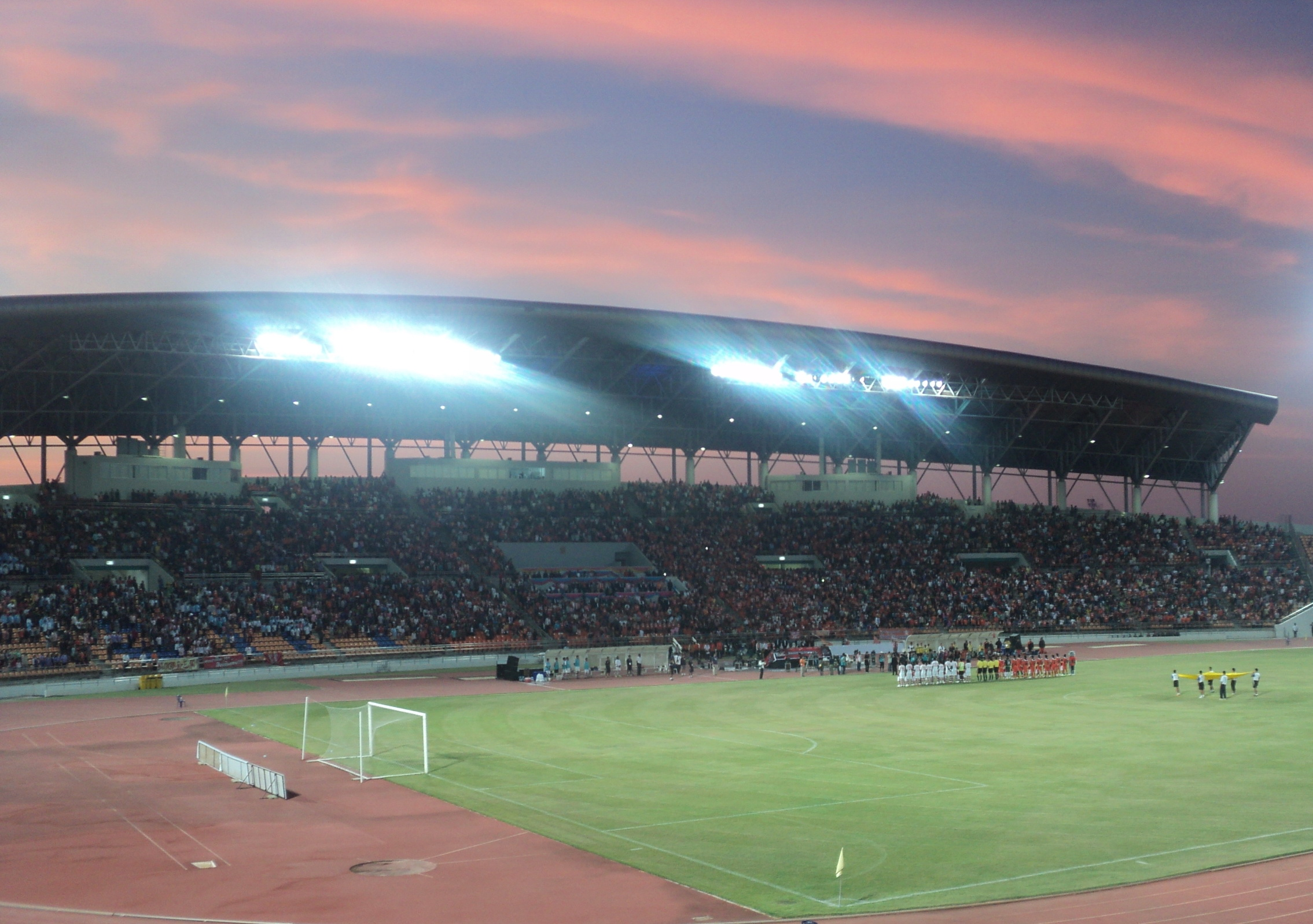
A full main stand: Nakhon Ratchasima v Roiet United in 2011

Nakhon Ratchasima play in the 80th Birthday Stadium which was the main stadium for the 2007 SEA Games. Nakhon Ratchasima moved to the stadium in the middle of the 2008 season having previously played at the city's Central Stadium. They also played home games in the town of Pak Chong when the Central Stadium was being renovated for the SEA Games during the 2007 season. The club originally played at the Suranaree Base Central Stadium close to Nakhon Ratchasima city centre. This was their main home stadium from 1999 to 2006, although they occasionally played at Nakhon Ratchasima Rajabhat University Stadium and Suranaree University of Technology stadium during this period.

Coordinates	Location	Stadium	Capacity	Year
14°42′59″N 101°26′40″E	Nakhon Ratchasima	Pak Chong Municipal Stadium	N/A	2007
14°59′21″N 102°06′40″E	Nakhon Ratchasima	Nakhon Ratchasima Municipal Stadium	2,000	2008
14°55′38″N 102°02′56″E	Nakhon Ratchasima	80th Birthday Stadium	25,000	2009–present

== Season by season record ==
Season	League									FA Cup	League Cup	AFC Champions League	Top scorer	
Season	Division	P	W	D	L	F	A	Pts	Pos	FA Cup	League Cup	AFC Champions League	Name	Goals
2007	DIV 1	22	7	7	8	27	25	28	9th	–	–	–	—N/a	—N/a
2008	DIV 2	20	9	4	7	36	19	31	4th	–	–	–	—N/a	—N/a
2009	DIV 2 Northeast	20	12	7	1	50	21	43	2nd	QF	–	–	—N/a	—N/a
2010	DIV 2 Northeast	30	14	9	7	51	37	51	4th	R1	R1	–	—N/a	—N/a
2011	DIV 2 Northeast	30	18	8	4*	62	25	60*	3rd	R1	R1	–	—N/a	—N/a
2012	DIV 1	34	12	10	12	31	43	47	8th	R4	R2	–	(Thailand) Promphong Kransumrong	16
2013	DIV 1	34	15	9	10	49	35	54	5th	R3	SF	–	(Japan) Yusuke Kato	14
2014	DIV 1	34	19	11	4	56	27	68	1st	R4	SF	–	(Brazil) Ivan Bošković	18
2015	TPL	34	13	10	11	37	43	49	8th	R3	R3	–	(Germany) Björn Lindemann	7
2016	TL	31	10	5	16	30	44	35	11th	R1	R2	–	(Nigeria) Marco Tagbajumi	9
2017	T1	34	10	11	13	42	48	41	12th	R2	R1	–	(Brazil) Paulo Rangel	11
2018	T1	34	13	8	13	36	44	47	7th	R1	SF	–	(Brazil) Leandro Assumpção	7
2019	T1	30	9	7	14	45	57	34	13th	QF	R1	–	(Brazil) Leandro Assumpção	15
2020–21	T1	30	11	9	10	40	41	42	9th	R1	–	–	(Brazil) Dennis Murillo	21
2021–22	T1	30	10	7	13	33	47	37	9th	RU	R1	–	(Ghana) Kwame Karikari	13
2022–23	T1	30	7	8	15	31	53	29	14th	QF	R1	–	(Spain) Tyronne del Pino	7
2023–24	T2	34	21	10	3	64	27	73	1st	R1	QF	–	(Brazil) Deyvison Fernandes	22
2024–25	T1	30	7	11	12	36	57	32	13th	QF	R1	–	(Brazil) Dennis Murillo	9
2025–26	T1	30	6	6	18	20	44	24	15th	R2	R2	–		

Champions	Runners-up	Third place	Promoted	Relegated

- P = Played
- W = Games won
- D = Games drawn
- L = Games lost
- F = Goals for
- A = Goals against
- Pts = Points
- Pos = Final position
- N/A = No answer
- TL = Thai League 1
- QR1 = First Qualifying Round
- QR2 = Second Qualifying Round
- QR3 = Third Qualifying Round
- QR4 = Fourth Qualifying Round
- RInt = Intermediate Round
- R1 = Round 1
- R2 = Round 2
- R3 = Round 3
- R4 = Round 4
- R5 = Round 5
- R6 = Round 6
- GR = Group stage
- QF = Quarter-finals
- SF = Semi-finals
- RU = Runners-up
- S = Shared
- W = Winners

== Players ==
=== Current squad ===
Note: Flags indicate national team as defined under FIFA eligibility rules; some limited exceptions apply. Players may hold more than one non-FIFA nationality.

No.	Pos.	Nation	Player
4	DF	THA	Bunyarit Srinam
6	DF	THA	Watcharapong Nuengprakaew
7	FW	THA	Kittisak Roekyamdee
8	MF	THA	Kanokpon Buspakom
9	FW	BRA	Carlos Eduardo
10	FW	BRA	Samuel
11	MF	THA	Anurak Mungdee
15	DF	THA	Woraphob Thaweesuk
16	DF	THA	Pichitchai Sienkrathok (on loan from Port)
18	GK	THA	Nopphon Lakhonphon (on loan from Buriram United)
19	FW	THA	Rattasat Bangsungnoen

No.	Pos.	Nation	Player
20	MF	KOR	Jang Wan
30	FW	THA	Pannatad Prempree
33	DF	THA	Charalampos Charalampous (on loan from Uthai Thani)
34	GK	THA	Achirawit Natsanthia
36	GK	THA	Tanachai Noorach
39	DF	THA	Watcharin Nuengprakaew (on loan from Bangkok)
44	DF	BRA	Alef (Captain)
45	DF	THA	Anusak Jaiphet
47	DF	THA	Narongsak Phetnok
55	GK	THA	Sorawit Srifah
59	MF	THA	Noppakron Kanhabang
99	FW	THA	Prakiattichai Singsook

=== Out on loan ===
Note: Flags indicate national team as defined under FIFA eligibility rules; some limited exceptions apply. Players may hold more than one non-FIFA nationality.

No. / Pos. / Nation / Player	No. / Pos. / Nation / Player

== Managerial history ==
- (Thailand) Man Chantanam 2007 –2009
- (Thailand) Wichan Chaonsri 2009 –2010
- (Thailand) Tewesh Kamolsin 2010 –2011
- (Thailand) Arjhan Srong-ngamsub 2012 –2013
- (Brazil) Reuther Moreira 2013
- (Japan) Sugao Kambe 2013 –2016
- (Serbia) Miloš Joksić 2016 –2019
- (Thailand) Chalermwoot Sa-ngapol 2019
- (Thailand) Teerasak Po-on 2019 –2022
- (England) Kevin Blackwell 2022 –2023
- (Thailand) Teerasak Po-on 2023 –2025
- (Thailand) Issara Sritaro 2025
- (Thailand) Surapong Kongthep 2025 –2526
- (Thailand) Kraikiat Koonthanazap 2026 –

== Honours ==
=== Leagues ===
- Thai League 2
  - Winners (2) : 2014, 2023–24

=== Cups ===
- Thai FA Cup
  - Runners-up (1): 2021–22
