= 2018 Port F.C. season =

Port F.C.
2018 season
- Chairman: Nualphan Lamsam
- Manager: Jadet Meelarp
- Stadium: PAT Stadium
- Thai League 1: 3rd
- Thai FA Cup: Round of 32
- Thai League Cup: Round of 16
- Top goalscorer: League: (Spain) Sergio Suárez (13 goals); All: (Montenegro) Dragan Bošković (16 goals)
Home colours	Away colours	Third colours

The 2018 season is Port's 22nd season in the Thai League, FA Cup, League Cup.

== Name's changes ==
This is Port F.C.'s name changing.

- 1967–2009 as Port Authority of Thailand Football Club (Port Authority of Thailand)
- 2009–2013 as Thai Port Football Club (Thai Port)
- 2013–2015 as Singhtarua Football Club (Singhtarua)
- 2015–present as "Port Football Club" (Port)

== Players ==
Players and squad numbers last updated on 6 February 2018.
Note: Flags indicate national team as has been defined under FIFA eligibility rules. Players may hold more than one non-FIFA nationality.

No.	Nat.	Position(s)	Name
Goalkeepers
1	GK	THA	Watchara Buathong
17	GK	THA	Rattanai Songsangchan
36	GK	THA	Worawut Srisupha
Defenders
4	DF	THA	Elias Dolah
6	DF	THA	Todsapol Lated
15	DF	THA	Jetjinn Sriprach
19	DF	THA	Panphanpong Pinkong
22	DF	ESP	David Rochela (captain)
24	DF	THA	Worawut Namvech
34	DF	THA	Nitipong Selanon
97	DF	THA	Kevin Deeromram
Midfielders
5	MF	ESP	Sergio Suárez
7	MF	THA	Pakorn Prempak
8	MF	KOR	Kim Sung-hwan
10	MF	THA	Bodin Phala
13	MF	THA	Adisorn Daeng-rueng
16	MF	THA	Siwakorn Jakkuprasat
31	MF	THA	Nurul Sriyankem
41	MF	THA	Pummared Kladkleeb
Forwards
9	FW	THA	Chakrit Rawanprakone
23	FW	MNE	Dragan Bošković (vc)
27	FW	IDN	Terens Puhiri
29	FW	THA	Arthit Butjinda

== Thai League ==
Overall								Home						Away					
Pld	W	D	L	GF	GA	GD	Pts	W	D	L	GF	GA	GD	W	D	L	GF	GA	GD
20	13	1	6	44	28	+16	40	8	0	2	25	13	+12	5	1	4	19	15	+4

Date	Opponents	H / A	Result F–A	Scorers	League position
11 February 2018	Pattaya United	H	3-0	Bošković 45', Suárez 74', Bordin 90'	1st
17 February 2018	Muangthong United	A	2-0	Peerapat 8' (o.g.), Suárez 66'	1st
24 February 2018	Ratchaburi Mitr Phol	H	3-2	Nurul 45+2', Suárez (2) 51', 68'	1st
4 March 2018	Bangkok Glass	A	0-2		3rd
11 March 2018	Ubon UMT United	H	1-0	Arthit 90+5'	3rd
17 March 2018	Sukhothai	A	2-2	Suárez 60', Bošković 69'	3rd
28 March 2018	Air Force Central	H	3-1	Bošković 38', Pakorn (2) 44', 56'	2nd
1 April 2018	Police Tero	A	2-4	Rochela 89' (pen.), Kevin 90+3'	3rd
7 April 2018	Bangkok United	H	0-3		5th
11 April 2018	Buriram United	A	1-3	Nurul 13'	8th
21 April 2018	PT Prachuap	H	1-0	Siwakorn 33'	5th
25 April 2018	Chainat Hornbill	A	1-2	Rochela 29' (pen.)	7th
28 April 2018	Chiangrai United	H	2-1	Rochela 10', Suárez 86' (pen.)	4th
6 May 2018	Nakhon Ratchasima	A	4-0	Nurul 12', Suárez 66', Bošković (2) 86', 90+1' (pen.)	4th
11 May 2018	Suphanburi	A	2-1	Bošković (2) 59', 70'	4th
20 May 2018	Navy	H	7-1	Suárez 22', Elias 35', Pakorn 43', Bošković (2) 49', 55' , Rochela 81', Kim 90+2'	3rd
26 May 2018	Chonburi	A	1-0	Suárez 23'	3rd
9 June 2018	Muangthong United	H	2-3	Suárez 54', Bošković 59'	3rd
16 June 2018	Ratchaburi Mitr Phol	A	4-1	Suárez (2) 9', 77' , Nurul 33', Bošković 86'	3rd
24 June 2018	Bangkok Glass	H	3-2	Bordin 26', Nurul 45+3', Suárez 58'	3rd
30 June 2018	Ubon UMT United	A			
8 July 2018	Sukhothai	H			

Pos	Team	Pld	W	D	L	GF	GA	GD	Pts	Qualification or relegation
1	Buriram United (C, Q)	34	28	3	3	76	25	+51	87	Qualification to 2019 AFC Champions League Group stage
2	Bangkok United (Q)	34	21	8	5	68	36	+32	71	Qualification to 2019 AFC Champions League Preliminary round 2
3	Port	34	19	4	11	73	45	+28	61	
4	Muangthong United	34	16	11	7	65	53	+12	59	
5	Chiangrai United (Q)	34	15	10	9	52	36	+16	55	Qualification to 2019 AFC Champions League Preliminary round 2 (Note: Chiangrai United qualified to the 2019 AFC Champions League Preliminary round 2 as winners of the 2018 Thai FA Cup.)

Source: Thai League
Rules for classification: 1) Points; 2) Head-to-head points; 3) Head-to-head goals difference; 4) Head-to-head goals scored; 5) Overall goals difference; 6) Overall goals scored; 7) Fair play points; 8) Play-off without extra time;).
(C) Champions; (Q) Qualified for the phase indicated

== Thai FA Cup ==
Date	Opponents	H / A	Result F–A	Scorers	Round
27 June 2018	Tamuang	A	5-1	Bošković (3) 10', 23', 25', Pakorn 48', Todsapol 59'	Round of 64
					Round of 32

== Thai League Cup ==
Date	Opponents	H / A	Result F–A	Scorers	Round
13 June 2018	Sukhothai	H	4-3	Bošković (2) 8', 73' (pen.), Suárez 19', Todsapol 86'	Round of 32
11 July 2018	Air Force Central	A			Round of 16

== Squad statistics ==
No.	Pos.	Name	League		FA Cup		League Cup		Total	
No.	Pos.	Name	Apps	Goals	Apps	Goals	Apps	Goals	Apps	Goals
1	GK	(Thailand) Watchara Buathong	0	0	0	0	0	0	0	0
4	DF	(Thailand) Elias Dolah	9+4	1	1	0	0	0	10+4	1
5	MF	(Spain) Sergio Suárez	14+2	13	0	0	1	1	15+2	14
6	DF	(Thailand) Todsapol Lated	8+1	0	1	1	1	1	10+1	2
7	MF	(Thailand) Pakorn Prempak	20	3	1	1	1	0	22	4
8	MF	(South Korea) Kim Sung-hwan	17	1	0	0	1	0	18	1
9	FW	(Thailand) Chakrit Rawanprakone	0+2	0	0+1	0	0	0	0+3	0
10	MF	(Thailand) Bordin Phala	3+17	2	1	0	1	0	5+17	2
13	MF	(Thailand) Adisorn Daeng-rueng	8+4	0	1	0	0	0	9+4	0
14	MF	(Thailand) Somprasong Promsorn	0	0	0	0	0	0	0	0
15	DF	(Thailand) Jetjinn Sriprach	0	0	0	0	0	0	0	0
16	MF	(Thailand) Siwakorn Jakkuprasat	18	1	1	0	1	0	20	1
17	GK	(Thailand) Rattanai Songsangchan	11+1	0	0	0	0	0	11+1	0
19	DF	(Thailand) Panphanpong Pinkong	0+3	0	1	0	1	0	2+3	0
22	DF	(Spain) David Rochela (c)	19	4	0	0	1	0	20	4
23	FW	(Montenegro) Dragan Bošković	19	11	1	3	1	2	21	16
24	DF	(Thailand) Worawut Namvech	0+1	0	0	0	0	0	0+1	0
27	FW	(Indonesia) Terens Puhiri	0+7	0	0+1	0	0	0	0+8	0
29	FW	(Thailand) Arthit Butjinda	0+11	1	1	0	0+1	0	1+12	1
31	MF	(Thailand) Nurul Sriyankem	20	5	0	0	0+1	0	20+1	5
34	DF	(Thailand) Nitipong Selanon	20	0	1	0	1	0	22	0
36	GK	(Thailand) Worawut Srisupha	9	0	1	0	1	0	11	0
41	MF	(Thailand) Pummared Kladkleeb	0	0	0+1	0	0	0	0+1	0
97	DF	(Thailand) Kevin Deeromram	20	1	0	0	0+1	0	20+1	1
Left club during season
-	DF	(Thailand) Meechok Marhasaranukun	0	0	0	0	0	0	0	0
-	FW	(Thailand) Tana Chanabut	0+2	0	0	0	0	0	0+2	0
-	MF	(Thailand) Athibordee Atirat	5+3	0	0	0	0	0	5+3	0

== Reserve team in Thai League 4 ==
Port send the reserve team to compete in T4 Bangkok Metropolitan Region as Port B.

Date	Opponents	H / A	Result F–A	Scorers	League position
12 February 2018	Dome	A	3–1	Chaowala (2) 17', 54', Partchya 72'	1st
18 February 2018	RSU	H	2-1	Chanayut 31', Chaowala 83'	3rd
25 February 2018	PTU Pathumthani	A	0–1		4th
5 March 2018	Bangkok United B	A	1-2	Danudet 65'	5th
18 March 2018	BGC	H	1-1	Chanayut 54'	5th
25 March 2018	Air Force Robinson	A	1-0	Chaowala 35'	5th
31 March 2018	North Bangkok University	A	0–1		6th

== Overall summary ==
=== Season summary ===
Games played	22 (20 Thai League, 1 FA Cup, 1 League Cup)
Games won	15 (13 Thai League, 1 FA Cup, 1 League Cup)
Games drawn	1 (1 Thai League, 0 FA Cup, 0 League Cup)
Games lost	6 (6 Thai League, 0 FA Cup, 0 League Cup)
Goals scored	53 (44 Thai League, 5 FA Cup, 4 League Cup)
Goals conceded	32 (28 Thai League, 1 FA Cup, 3 League Cup)
Goal difference	+21
Clean sheets	6 (6 Thai League, 0 FA Cup, 0 League Cup)
Best result	7-1 vs Navy (20 May 18)
Worst result	0-3 (2 games)
Most appearances	3 players (22 games)
Top scorer	(Montenegro) Dragan Bošković (16 goals)
Points	40

=== Score overview ===
Opposition	Home score	Away score	Double
Air Force Central	3-1	-	
Bangkok Glass	3-2	0-3	No
Bangkok United	0-3	-	No
Buriram United	-	1-3	No
Chainat Hornbill	-	1-2	No
Chiangrai United	2-1	-	
Chonburi	1-0	-	
Muangthong United	2-3	2-0	No
Nakhon Ratchasima	-	4-0	
Navy	7-1	-	
Pattaya United	3-0	-	
Police Tero	-	2-4	No
PT Prachuap	1-0	-	
Ratchaburi Mitr Phol	3-2	4-1	Yes
Sukhothai	-	2-2	No
Suphanburi	-	2-1	
Ubon UMT United	1-0	-	

== Transfers ==
First Thai footballer's market is opening on 14 November 2017 to 5 February 2018
Second Thai footballer's market is opening on 11 June 2018 to 9 July 2018

=== In ===
Date	Pos.	Name	From
1 December 2017	DF	(Thailand) Panphanpong Pinkong	(Thailand) Bangkok United
1 December 2017	FW	(Thailand) Chakrit Rawanprakone	(Thailand) Nakhon Ratchasima
1 December 2017	MF	(Germany) Bajram Nebihi	(Thailand) Ubon UMT United
1 December 2017	MF	(Thailand) Athibordee Atirat	(Thailand) Nakhon Ratchasima
6 December 2017	MF	(Thailand) Bordin Phala	(Thailand) Buriram United
6 December 2017	MF	(Thailand) Nurul Sriyankem	(Thailand) Chonburi
6 December 2017	MF	(South Korea) Kim Sung-hwan	(South Korea) Ulsan Hyundai
19 December 2017	FW	(Montenegro) Dragan Bošković	(Thailand) Bangkok United
3 January 2018	FW	(Thailand) Arthit Butjinda	(Thailand) Buriram United
5 February 2018	DF	(Thailand) Kevin Deeromram	(Thailand) Ratchaburi Mitr Phol

=== Out ===
Date	Pos.	Name	To
1 December 2017	MF	(Japan) Genki Nagasato	Free agent
1 December 2017	MF	(Thailand) Anisong Chareantham	(Thailand) Nongbua Pitchaya
9 December 2017	MF	(Thailand) Ittipol Poolsap	(Thailand) Pattaya United
1 January 2018	MF	(Thailand) Piyachat Srimarueang	Retired
1 January 2018	MF	(Thailand) Siwapong Jarernsin	(Thailand) Khon Kaen
5 January 2018	FW	(Thailand) Pinyo Inpinit	(Thailand) Police Tero
5 January 2018	FW	(Thailand) Wuttichai Tathong	(Thailand) Ubon UMT United
18 January 2018	MF	(Thailand) Ekkapoom Potharungroj	(Thailand) Air Force Central
19 January 2018	MF	(Thailand) Narakorn Khana	(Thailand) Navy
20 January 2018	FW	(Palestine) Matías Jadue	(Thailand) Krabi
29 January 2018	FW	(Brazil) Josimar	(Brazil) CSA
6 February 2018	DF	(Thailand) Pakasit Saensook	Retired
2 May 2018	DF	(Thailand) Meechok Marhasaranukun	(Thailand) Suphanburi
2 June 2018	FW	(Thailand) Tana Chanabut	(Thailand) Nongbua Pitchaya

=== Loan in ===
Date from	Date to	Pos.	Name	From
20 December 2017	30 November 2018	FW	(Indonesia) Terens Puhiri	(Indonesia) Borneo
5 February 2018	30 November 2018	DF	(Thailand) Worawut Namvech	(Thailand) Chiangrai United

=== Loan out ===
Date from	Date to	Pos.	Name	To
5 February 2018	31 May 2018	DF	(Thailand) Yossawat Montha	(Thailand) Ubon UMT United
5 February 2018	31 May 2018	MF	(Germany) Bajram Nebihi	(Thailand) Chiangrai United
1 June 2018	30 November 2018	MF	(Thailand) Athibordee Atirat	(Thailand) Navy
1 June 2018	30 November 2018	DF	(Thailand) Yossawat Montha	(Thailand) PT Prachuap
12 June 2018	30 November 2018	MF	(Germany) Bajram Nebihi	(Thailand) Chonburi
