= 2017 Port F.C. season =

Port
2017 season
- Chairman: Nualphan Lamsam
- Manager: Jadet Meelarp (until 22 June), (since 21 September – present); Kiatisuk Senamuang (23 June – 20 September)
- Stadium: PAT Stadium
- Thai League T1: 9th
- Thai FA Cup: Third Round
- Thai League Cup: Second Round
- Top goalscorer: League: Josimar (13); All: Josimar (17)
Home colours	Away colours

The 2017 season is Port's 21st season in the Thai League, FA Cup, League Cup.

== Competitions ==
=== Thai League ===
==== Matches ====
Win Draw Loss

Date	Opponents	H / A	Result F–A	Scorers
11 February 2017	Ratchaburi Mitr Phol	H	1–1	Genki 90+5'
19 February 2017	Suphanburi	H	3–2	Andrija 7', Tana 64', Sergio 72'
25 February 2017	Bangkok United	A	6–2	Siwakorn 38', Tana 70'
4 March 2017	Navy	H	1–0	Nitipong 4'
8 March 2017	Thai Honda	A	5–1	Pakorn 70'
11 March 2017	Buriram United	H	0–0	
3 April 2017	Ubon UMT United	H	1–0	Josimar 57'
9 April 2017	Chiangrai United	A	1–3	Genki 31', Sergio 43', Josimar 79'
19 April 2017	Bangkok Glass	H	0–3	
23 April 2017	Sukhothai	A	2–3	Josimar (2) 9', 63', Hiromichi 70' (o.g.)
30 April 2017	BEC Tero Sasana	H	2–1	Josimar 23', Siwakorn 55'
3 May 2017	Chonburi	A	2–1	Pakorn 30'
6 May 2017	Pattaya United	H	0–2	
14 May 2017	Nakhon Ratchasima	A	0–0	
17 May 2017	Muangthong United	A	2–3	Josimar (2) 42', 45+1', Sergio 79'
21 May 2017	Super Power Samut Prakan	H	5–3	David (2) 14' (pen.), 88' (pen.), Pakorn 16', Genki 23', Josimar 27'
27 May 2017	Sisaket	A	2–2	Pakorn 42', Siwakorn 49'
17 June 2017	Suphanburi	A	2–0	
25 June 2017	Bangkok United	H	0–3	
28 June 2017	Navy	A	2–2	Genki 28', Pakorn 42'
2 July 2017	Thai Honda	H	3–1	Panphanpong 42', Sergio 64', Andrija 78'
5 July 2017	Buriram United	A	1–0	
9 July 2017	Ubon UMT United	A	2–1	Andrija 47'
30 July 2017	Chiangrai United	H	1–2	David 57' (pen.)
5 August 2017	Bangkok Glass	A	0–0	
10 September 2017	Sukhothai	H	3–3	Sergio 9', Nitipong 14', David 61' (pen.)
16 September 2017	BEC Tero Sasana	A	2–1	David 51'
20 September 2017	Chonburi	H	1–3	Josimar 13'
24 September 2017	Pattaya United	A	2–5	Josimar (2) 2', 78', Todsapol (2) 5', 29', Sergio 89'
14 October 2017	Nakhon Ratchasima	A	3–1	David 40' (pen.), Josimar 48', Sergio 75'
22 October 2017	Muangthong United	H	1–1	Josimar 63'
8 November 2017	Super Power Samut Prakan	A	1–3	Sergio 15', Tana 83', Pakorn 90+3'
11 November 2017	Sisaket	H	5–3	Sergio (2) 37', 73', Genki 54', Pakorn 57', David 84' (pen.)
18 November 2017	Ratchaburi Mitr Phol	H	2–3	Todsapol 11', Sergio 67', Sila 86' (o.g.)

== Thai FA Cup ==
Date	Opponents	H / A	Result F–A	Scorers	Round
21 June 2017	Royal Thai Fleet	H	5–0	Josimar (2) 3', 52', Piyachat 16', Elias 23', 90+2'	Round of 64
2 August 2017	Ayutthaya United	H	2–0	Josimar (2) 58', 90+4'	Round of 32
27 September 2017	Bangkok United	A	1–5	Genki 8'	Round of 16

== Thai League Cup ==
Date	Opponents	H / A	Result F–A	Scorers	Round
26 July 2017	Ayutthaya United	A	2–1 (aet)	Sergio 90+2', 116'	Round of 32
1 October 2017	Air Force Central	A	1–2 (aet)	Sergio 56'	Round of 16

== Squad goals statistics ==
No.	Pos.	Name	League	FA Cup	League Cup	Total
4	DF	(Thailand) Elias Dolah	0	2	0	2
5	MF	(Spain) Sergio Suárez	11	0	3	14
6	MF	(Thailand) Todsapol Lated	3	0	0	3
9	MF	(Thailand) Pakorn Prempak	7	0	0	7
10	FW	(Serbia) Andrija Kaluđerović	3	0	0	3
16	MF	(Thailand) Siwakorn Jakkuprasat	3	0	0	3
18	MF	(Japan) Genki Nagasato	5	1	0	6
19	DF	(Thailand) Panphanpong Pinkong	1	0	0	1
22	DF	(Spain) David Rochela	7	0	0	7
30	FW	(Brazil) Josimar	13	4	0	17
34	DF	(Thailand) Nitipong Selanon	2	0	0	2
88	MF	(Thailand) Piyachat Srimarueang	0	1	0	1
99	FW	(Thailand) Tana Chanabut	3	0	0	3
—	—	Own goals	2	0	0	2
