= 2022–23 Port F.C. season =

Port
2022-23 season
- Chairman: (Thailand) Nualphan Lamsam
- Manager: (England) Scott Cooper (until 14 November 2022) (Wales) Matthew Holland (until 11 November 2021) (Thailand) Choketawee Promrut and (Thailand) Surapong Kongthep (from 5 February 2023)
- Stadium: PAT Stadium, Khlong Toei, Bangkok, Thailand
- Thai League T1: 3rd
- Thai FA Cup: Semi-Final
- Thai League Cup: First Round
- Top goalscorer: League: Hamilton (15); All: Hamilton (16)

The 2022-23 season is Port's 6th consecutive seasons in top flight after promoted back from Thai League 2 in 2017. In this season, Port participates in 3 competitions which consisted of the Thai League, FA Cup, and League Cup.

The season started on 12 August 2022 and concluded on 12 May 2023.

== Squad ==
As of 12 May 2023

Squad No.	Name	Nationality	Date of birth (age)	Previous club
Goalkeepers
1	Somporn Yos	(Thailand)	23 June 1993 (age 33)	(Thailand) Muangthong United
13	Rattanai Songsangchan	(Thailand)	10 June 1995 (age 31)	(Thailand) Police United F.C.
36	Worawut Srisupha (Vice-captain)	(Thailand)	25 May 1992 (age 34)	(Thailand) Bangkok F.C.
Defenders
2	Thitawee Aksornsri	(Thailand)	8 November 1997 (age 28)	(Thailand) Police Tero F.C.
3	Thitathorn Aksornsri	(Thailand)	8 November 1997 (age 28)	(Thailand) Police Tero F.C.
4	Elias Dolah	(Thailand)	24 April 1993 (age 33)	(Thailand) Songkhla United F.C.
15	Suphanan Bureerat	(Thailand)	10 December 1993 (age 32)	(Thailand) Samut Prakan City F.C.
21	Frans Putros	(Iraq)	14 July 1993 (age 32)	(Denmark) Viborg FF
22	David Rochela	(Spain)	19 February 1990 (age 36)	(Thailand) Buriram United F.C.
23	Kevin Deeromram	(Thailand)	11 September 1997 (age 28)	(Thailand) Ratchaburi Mitr Phol F.C.
24	Worawut Namvech	(Thailand)	4 July 1995 (age 30)	(Thailand) Nongbua Pitchaya F.C.
27	Airton	(Brazil)	12 March 1990 (age 36)	(Thailand) Nongbua Pitchaya F.C.
29	Thiti Thumporn	(Thailand)	27 April 1999 (age 27)	(Thailand) Nakhon Ratchasima F.C.
30	Martin Steuble	(Philippines) (Switzerland)	9 June 1988 (age 38)	(Thailand) Muangkan United F.C.
33	Philip Roller	(Thailand)	10 June 1994 (age 32)	(Thailand) Ratchaburi Mitr Phol F.C.
Midfielders
6	Charyl Chappuis	(Thailand)	22 January 1992 (age 34)	(Thailand) Muangthong United F.C.
7	Pakorn Prempak (Vice-captain)	(Thailand)	2 February 1993 (age 33)	(Thailand) Police United F.C.
8	Tanaboon Kesarat (captain)	(Thailand)	21 May 1993 (age 33)	(Thailand) BG Pathum United F.C.
9	Negueba	(Brazil)	7 April 1992 (age 34)	(Brazil) Criciúma
10	Bordin Phala	(Thailand)	20 December 1994 (age 31)	(Thailand) Buriram United F.C.
12	William Weidersjö	(Thailand)	10 June 2001 (age 25)	(Sweden) Hammarby TFF
16	Siwakorn Jakkuprasat	(Thailand)	23 April 1992 (age 34)	(Thailand) Muangthong United F.C.
17	Ben Davis	(Thailand)	24 November 2000 (age 25)	(England) Oxford United F.C.
18	Pathompol Charoenrattanapirom	(Thailand)	21 April 1994 (age 32)	(Thailand) BG Pathum United F.C.
19	Nattawut Sombatyotha	(Thailand)	1 May 1996 (age 30)	(Thailand) Ratchaburi Mitr Phol F.C.
44	Worachit Kanitsribampen	(Thailand)	24 August 1997 (age 28)	(Thailand) BG Pathum United F.C.
-	Tawin Mahajindawong	(Thailand)	9 March 1998 (age 28)	(Belgium) OH Leuven
Forwards
5	Sergio Suárez	(Spain)	9 January 1987 (age 39)	(Thailand) Songkhla United F.C.
14	Teerasak Poeiphimai	(Thailand)	21 September 2002 (age 23)	(Thailand) Prime Bangkok F.C.
25	Hamilton	(Brazil)	31 May 1991 (age 35)	(Thailand) Nongbua Pitchaya F.C.
Players loaned out / left during season
8	Go Seul-ki	(South Korea)	21 April 1986 (age 40)	(Thailand) Buriram United F.C.
11	Tanasith Siripala	(Thailand)	9 August 1995 (age 30)	(Thailand) Suphanburi F.C.
13	Nurul Sriyankem	(Thailand)	8 February 1992 (age 34)	(Thailand) Chonburi F.C.
20	Gustav Sahlin	(Thailand)	30 July 1999 (age 26)	(Sweden) Skövde AIK
25	Chatcharin Phutangdaen	(Thailand)	2 June 1998 (age 28)	Youth Team
34	Adisorn Promrak	(Thailand)	21 October 1993 (age 32)	(Thailand) Muangthong United F.C.

== Competitions ==
=== Overview ===
Competition	First match	Last match	Starting round	Final position	Record							
Competition	First match	Last match	Starting round	Final position	Pld	W	D	L	GF	GA	GD	Win %
Thai League	14 August 2022	12 May 2023	Matchday 1	3rd	30	14	10	6	52	38	+14	46.67
FA Cup	2 November 2022	19 April 2023	Second Round	Semi-Final	5	4	0	1	11	2	+9	80.00
League Cup	16 November 2022	16 November 2022	First Round	First Round	1	0	0	1	0	1	−1	0.00
Total					36	18	10	8	63	41	+22	50.00

Last updated: 12 May 2023
Source: Competitions

=== Thai League 1 ===
==== League table ====
Pos	Team	Pld	W	D	L	GF	GA	GD	Pts	Qualification
1	Buriram United (Note: As 2021–22 Thai League 1 winners) (C, Q)	30	23	5	2	75	27	+48	74	Qualification for 2023–24 AFC Champions League group stage
2	Bangkok United (Q)	30	19	5	6	55	22	+33	62	Qualification for 2023–24 AFC Champions League group stage
3	Port (Q)	30	14	10	6	52	38	+14	52	Qualification for 2023–24 AFC Champions League qualifying play-offs
4	Muangthong United	30	14	8	8	56	37	+19	50	
5	Chiangrai United	30	12	8	10	44	42	+2	44	

Updated to match(es) played on 12 May 2023. Source: Thai League
Rules for classification: 1) Points; 2) Head-to-head points; 3) Head-to-head goals difference; 4) Head-to-head goals scored; 5) Overall goals difference; 6) Overall goals scored; 7) Fair play points; 8) Play-off without extra time;).
(C) Champions; (Q) Qualified for the phase indicated

==== Results summary ====
Overall								Home						Away					
Pld	W	D	L	GF	GA	GD	Pts	W	D	L	GF	GA	GD	W	D	L	GF	GA	GD
30	14	10	6	52	38	+14	52	9	4	2	30	17	+13	5	6	4	22	21	+1

== Team statistics ==
=== Appearances and goals ===
As of 12 May 2023

No.	Pos.	Player	League		FA Cup		League Cup		Total	
No.	Pos.	Player	Apps.	Goals	Apps.	Goals	Apps.	Goals	Apps.	Goals
1	GK	(Thailand) Somporn Yos	14	0	3	0	0	0	17	0
2	DF	(Thailand) Thitawee Aksornsri	1	0	0	0	0	0	1	0
3	DF	(Thailand) Thitathorn Aksornsri	11	0	3	0	1	0	15	0
4	DF	(Thailand) Elias Dolah	19	2	4	1	0	0	23	3
5	FW	(Spain) Sergio Suárez	15	1	2	1	0	0	17	2
6	MF	(Thailand) Charyl Chappuis	12	0	2	0	1	0	15	0
7	MF	(Thailand) Pakorn Prempak	27	4	4	0	0	0	31	4
8	MF	(Thailand) Tanaboon Kesarat	28	1	3	0	0	0	31	1
9	MF	(Brazil) Negueba	24	3	5	2	1	0	30	5
10	MF	(Thailand) Bordin Phala	29	5	5	1	1	0	35	6
12	MF	(Thailand) William Weidersjö	16	1	2	0	1	0	19	1
13	GK	(Thailand) Rattanai Songsangchan	1	0	0	0	0	0	1	0
14	FW	(Thailand) Teerasak Poeiphimai	23	8	5	3	0	0	28	11
15	DF	(Thailand) Suphanan Bureerat	26	2	5	1	0	0	31	3
16	MF	(Thailand) Siwakorn Jakkuprasat	7	0	0	0	0	0	7	0
17	MF	(Thailand) Ben Davis	14	0	2	0	1	0	17	0
18	MF	(Thailand) Pathompol Charoenrattanapirom	12	0	3	0	0	0	15	0
19	MF	(Thailand) Nattawut Sombatyotha	3	0	0	0	0	0	3	0
21	DF	(Iraq) Frans Putros	25	2	4	0	0	0	29	2
22	DF	(Spain) David Rochela	2	0	0	0	1	0	3	0
23	DF	(Thailand) Kevin Deeromram	17	0	4	0	0	0	21	0
24	DF	(Thailand) Worawut Namvech	12	0	3	0	1	0	16	0
25	FW	(Brazil) Hamilton	26	15	5	1	1	0	32	16
27	DF	(Brazil) Airton	21	2	2	0	0	0	23	2
29	DF	(Thailand) Thiti Thumporn	2	0	0	0	0	0	2	0
30	DF	(Philippines) Martin Steuble	8	0	1	0	0	0	9	0
33	DF	(Thailand) Philip Roller	0	0	0	0	0	0	0	0
36	GK	(Thailand) Worawut Srisupha	15	0	2	0	1	0	18	0
44	MF	(Thailand) Worachit Kanitsribampen	14	5	3	1	0	0	17	6
	MF	(Thailand) Tawin Mahajindawong	0	0	0	0	0	0	0	0
Players loaned out / left during season
8	MF	(South Korea) Go Seul-ki	0	0	0	0	0	0	0	0
11	MF	(Thailand) Tanasith Siripala	12	0	1	0	1	0	14	0
13	MF	(Thailand) Nurul Sriyankem	0	0	0	0	0	0	0	0
20	MF	(Thailand) Gustav Sahlin	3	0	0	0	1	0	4	0
34	DF	(Thailand) Adisorn Promrak	1	0	1	0	1	0	3	0

== Overall summary ==
=== Season summary ===
Games played	36 (30 Thai League, 5 FA Cup, 1 League Cup
Games won	18 (14 Thai League, 4 FA Cup, 0 League Cup
Games drawn	10 (10 Thai League, 0 FA Cup, 0 League Cup
Games lost	8 (6 Thai League, 1 FA Cup, 1 League Cup
Goals scored	63 (52 Thai League, 11 FA Cup, 0 League Cup
Goals conceded	41 (38 Thai League, 2 FA Cup, 1 League Cup
Goal difference	+22
Clean sheets	10 (6 Thai League, 4 FA Cup, 0 League Cup
Best result	4-0 vs Chiangmai United (8 February 23)
Worst result	0-2 vs Buriram United (19 April 23)
Most appearances	Bordin Phala (35)
Top scorer	Hamilton (16)
Points	52
