= 2019 Thai FA Cup final =

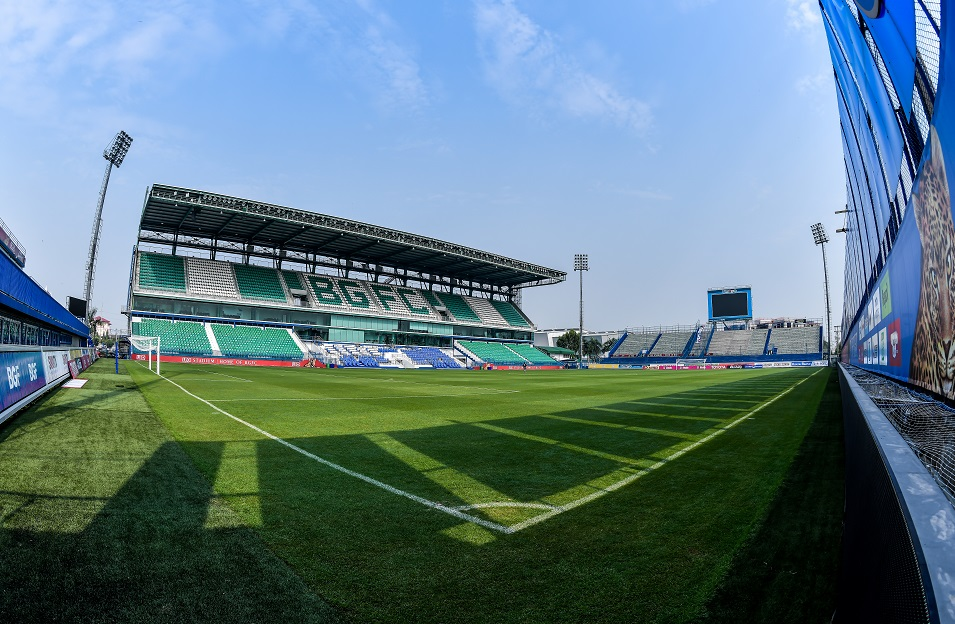
- The match took place at the Leo Stadium.
- Event: 2019 Thai FA Cup
Ratchaburi Mitr Phol	Port
0	1
- Date: 2 November 2019
- Venue: Leo Stadium, Pathum Thani
- Man of the Match: Go Seul-ki (Port)
- Referee: Chaireag Ngam-som (Thailand)
- Attendance: 6,848
- Weather: Mostly cloudy 27 °C (81 °F) humidity 83%

The 2019 Thai FA Cup final was the final match of the 2019 Thai FA Cup, the 26th season of a Thailand's football tournament organised by Football Association of Thailand. It was played at the Leo Stadium in Pathum Thani, Thailand on 2 November 2019, between Ratchaburi Mitr Phol a big team from the Western part and Port a big team from the capital of Thailand.

== Road to the final ==
Ratchaburi Mitr Phol (T1)		Round	Port (T1)	
Opponent	Result	Knockout 1 leg	Opponent	Result
Chachoengsao Hi-Tek (T3)	4–0 (H)	Round of 64	Samut Sakhon (T2)	6–0 (H)
Chainat Hornbill (T1)	2–0 (H)	Round of 32	Sukhothai (T1)	4–1 (H)
Nakhon Si United (T3)	2–0 (A)	Round of 16	SCG Muangthong United (T1)	2–0 (A)
Thai Honda (T2)	3–1 (H)	Quarter-finals	Chiangrai United (T1)	3–2 (H)
Buriram United (T1)	2–1 (N)	Semi-finals	Bangkok United (T1)	0–0 (a.e.t.) (5–4p) (N)

Note: In all results below, the score of the finalist is given first (H: home; A: away; T1: Clubs from Thai League 1; T2: Clubs from Thai League 2; T3: Clubs from Thai League 3; T4: Clubs from Thai League 4.

== Match ==
The first half of the final was an engrossing affair, with both sides being denied a goal each by VAR.

Port's Pakorn Prempak was sent off in the dying moments following a VAR review.

While Port were comparatively more enterprising in their opponents' half, Ratchaburi looked dangerous on the few counter-attacks they launched.

Pakorn saw his shot sail over the bar early in the match before Bordin Phala was twice denied by Ratchaburi defenders, including one by their skipper Philip Roller in the seventh minute.

Ratchaburi attacks were mostly thwarted by a solid Port defence. Lossemy Karaboue came the closest only to see his attempt being warded off by Port goalkeeper Worawut Srisupha.

Port found the net in the 25th minute but the goal was scratched off the scoresheet following a VAR intervention.

Sergio Suarez picked up a through pass to race into the box and slide the ball across from the right to Sumanya Purisay to fire it home.

However, a consultation with the referee on TV revealed that Suarez had been in an off-side position when he took the pass from Pakorn, who was impressive in his role as a playmaker for the Khlong Toei-based club.

Then it was Ratchaburi's turn to become a victim of VAR's sharp eye.

Worawut fumbled a Steeven Langil cross from the left and Karaboue was quick to pounce on the mistake by Port's custodian to tap it into the net and kick-start celebrations from the Ratchaburi fans.

However, the match referee turned to the VAR officials as before the ball had sailed on to Langil on the left flank, Karaboue had skidded into Worawut and it was deemed a foul.

=== Details ===
2 November 2019
19:00 UTC+7

Ratchaburi Mitr Phol	0–1	Port
	Report; News; Highlights; Full match	Sergio Suárez 48'

Leo Stadium, Pathum Thani
Attendance: 6,848
Referee: Chaireang Ngam-som (Thailand)

Ratchaburi Mitr Phol	Port

GK	27	(Thailand) Ukrit Wongmeema
CB	16	(South Korea) Yoo Jun-soo		(substituted off) 88'
CB	39	(Thailand) Pawee Tanthatemee	(yellow card) 63' (yellow-red card) 79'
CB	17	(Thailand) Ekkaluck Thongkit	(yellow card) 90+4'
DM	19	(Thailand) Kritsananon Srisuwan
RM	33	(Thailand) Philip Roller (c)
CM	18	(Ivory Coast) Lossémy Karaboué	(yellow card) 72'
CM	8	(Philippines) Amin Nazari		(substituted off) 58'
LM	22	(Thailand) Jirawat Thongsaengphrao		(substituted off) 53'
SS	11	(Martinique) Steeven Langil	(yellow card) 45+2'
CF	94	(Ivory Coast) Yannick Boli
Substitutes:
GK	46	(Thailand) Kittipong Phuthawchueak
DF	2	(Thailand) Sila Srikampang		(substituted on) 88'
DF	4	(Thailand) Pravinwat Boonyong
DF	6	(Thailand) Alongkorn Prathumwong		(substituted on) 53'
MF	14	(Thailand) Montree Promsawat
MF	15	(Thailand) Narakorn Noomchansakul
MF	31	(Thailand) Pathomchai Sueasakul		(substituted on) 58'
FW	32	(Thailand) Yodsak Chaowana
FW	45	(Thailand) Sitthinan Rungrueang
Head Coach:
(Thailand) Somchai Maiwilai

GK	36	(Thailand) Worawut Srisupha
RB	34	(Thailand) Nitipong Selanon
CB	4	(Thailand) Elias Dolah
CB	22	(Spain) David Rochela (c)
LB	97	(Thailand) Kevin Deeromram		(substituted off) 82'
DM	71	(Thailand) Tanaboon Kesarat	(yellow card) 55'
RM	5	(Spain) Sergio Suárez		(substituted off) 77'
CM	8	(South Korea) Go Seul-ki
LM	11	(Thailand) Sumanya Purisai
CF	7	(Thailand) Pakorn Prempak	(red card) 90+4'
CF	10	(Thailand) Bordin Phala		(substituted off) 65'
Substitutes:
GK	17	(Thailand) Rattanai Songsangchan
DF	6	(Thailand) Todsapol Lated
DF	15	(Philippines) Martin Steuble		(substituted on) 65'
DF	19	(Thailand) Panphanpong Pinkong
DF	35	(Thailand) Athibordee Atirat
MF	20	(Thailand) Anon Samakorn
MF	21	(Thailand) Jirattikan Vapilai
FW	31	(Thailand) Nurul Sriyankem		(substituted on) 82'
FW	99	(Panama) Rolando Blackburn		(substituted on) 77'
Head Coach:
(Thailand) Choketawee Promrut

Assistant referees:
(Thailand) Poonsawat Samransuk
(Thailand) Worapong Prasartsri
Fourth official:
(Thailand) Wiwat Jumpa-on
Assistant VAR:
(Thailand) Sivakorn Pu-udom
(Thailand) Rawut Nakarit
Match Commissioner:
(Thailand) Ekachai Tanaddernkao
Referee Assessor:
(Thailand) Preecha Kangram
General Coordinator:
(Thailand) Jetsada Dujnakee

Match rules:

- 90 minutes.
- 30 minutes extra-time if necessary.
- Penalty shoot-out if still necessary.
- Maximum of three substitutions.

== Winner ==
2019 Thai FA Cup
Winners
Port
Third title

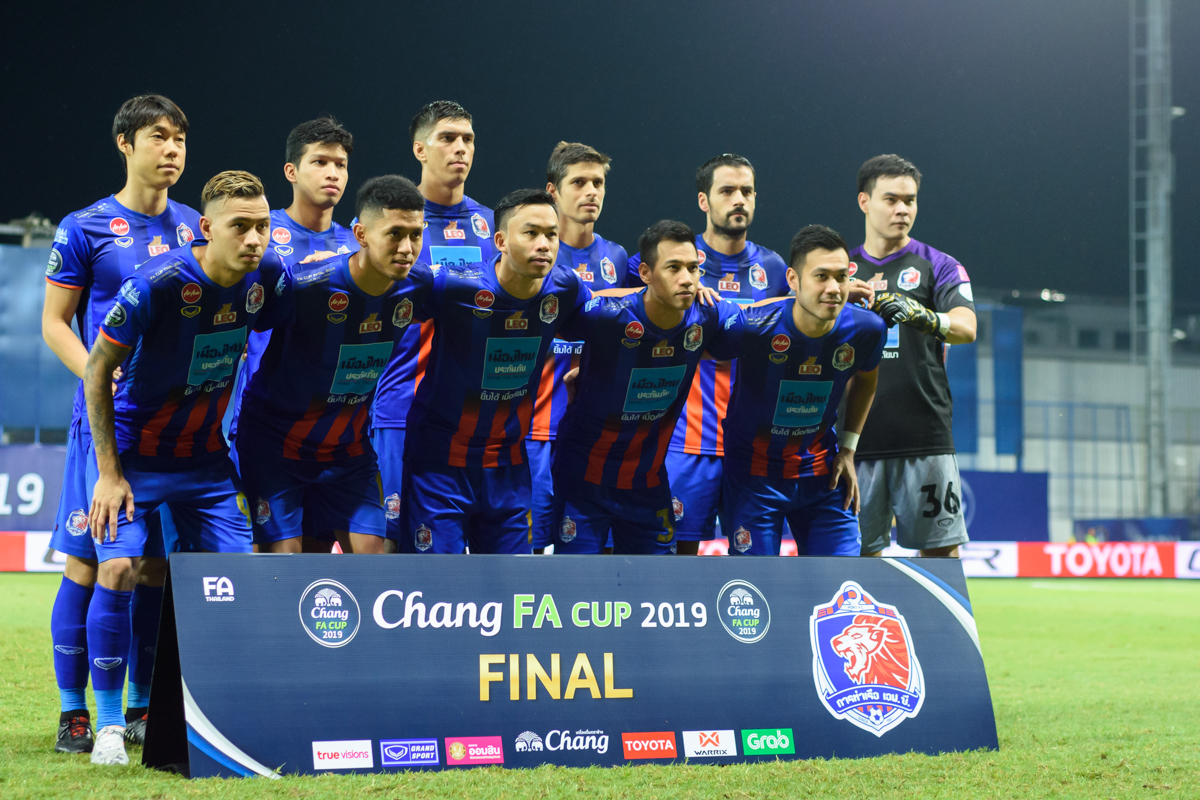
Port's starting XI in the final

== See also ==
- 2019 Thai League 1
- 2019 Thai League 2
- 2019 Thai League 3
- 2019 Thai League 4
- 2019 Thai FA Cup
- 2019 Thai League Cup
