= Jadet Meelarp =

Thai football manager

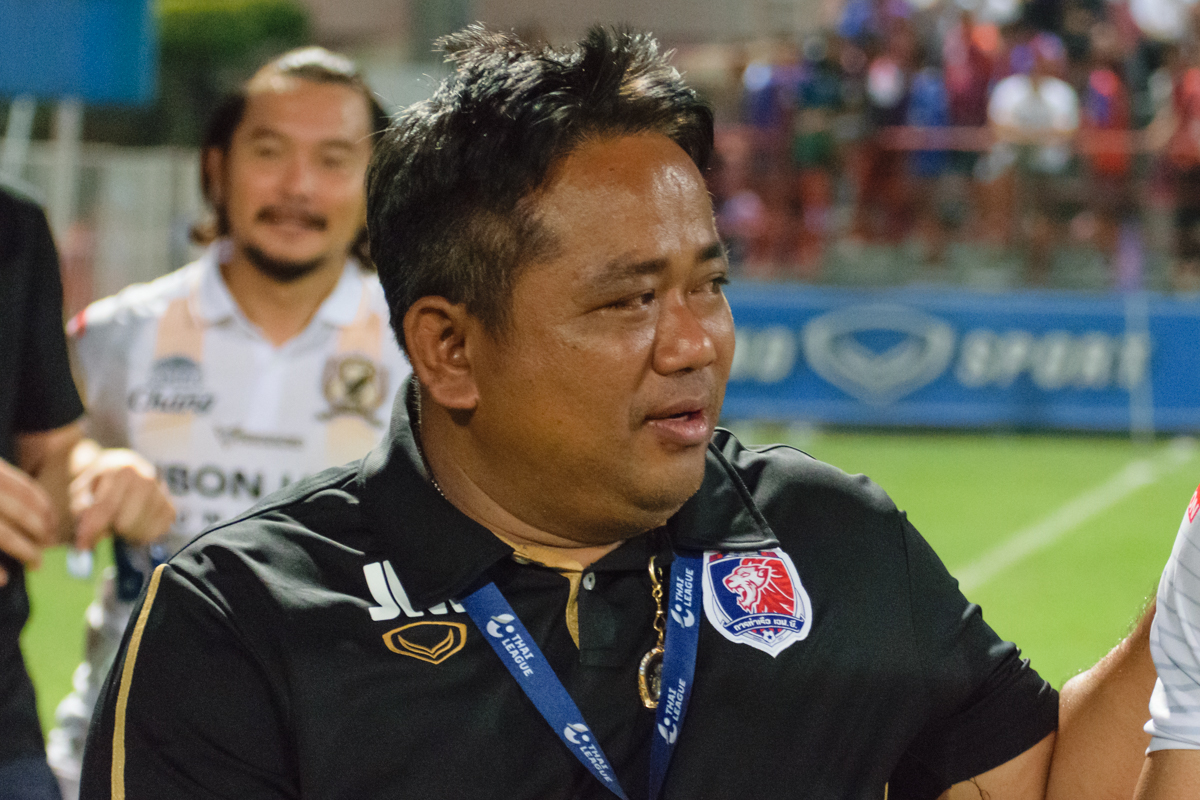
- Meelarp with Port in 2018

Personal information
- Full name: Jadet Meelarp
- Date of birth: 17 January 1972 (age 54)
- Place of birth: Lopburi, Thailand
- Height: 1.67 m (5 ft 5 1/2 in)

Team information
- Current team: Kasetsart (head coach)

Youth career
- Years: Team
- 1985–1987: Phothong Phittayakom School
- 1988–1990: Chinorot Wittayalai School
- 1991–1992: IPE Samut Sakhon
- 1993–1994: Mahidol University

Managerial career
- 2007–2008: Chonburi
- 2009: Thai Airways-Ban Bueng
- 2009: Pattaya United
- 2009–2011: Chonburi
- 2012–2013: Songkhla United
- 2014: Chainat Hornbill
- 2015: Chonburi
- 2016: PTT Rayong
- 2016–2017: Port
- 2017–2019: Port
- 2020: Port
- 2021: Muangkan United
- 2021–2022: Thailand (assistant)
- 2022: Port (interim)
- 2022–2023: Customs United
- 2023–2024: Thailand (assistant)
- 2024–2025: Thailand U17
- 2025–2026: Navy
- 2026–: Kasetsart
- ‡ National team caps and goals as of December 6, 2008

Jadet Meelarp (Thai: จเด็จ มีลาภ; born January 17, 1972), simply known as Sir Det (Thai: เซอร์เด็จ), is a Thai professional football manager, who is the head coach of Thai League 2 club Kasetsart.

During 2021 to 2022 he was the assistant manager to Alexandré Pölking with the Thailand national team.

== Managerial career ==
Jadet took over the role from Thai footballer and manager Withaya Laohakul who went on to coach in Japan. Jadet led Chonburi in their first season in Asian competition, overcoming a strong Melbourne Victory outfit 3-1 in a game played in Bangkok. In 2017 Jadet became manager of Port after their former manager, Kiatisak Senamuang, resigned. In 2018 he got new footballers: Dragan Boskovic, Nurul Sriyankem, Kim Sung-Hwan, Terens Puhiri, Kevin Deeromram and Worawut Namvech.

== Managerial statistics ==
As of match played 21 November 2026

Managerial record by team and tenure
| Team | From | To | Record | | | | |
| Team | From | To | P | W | D | L | Win % |
|---|---|---|---|---|---|---|---|
| Chonburi | 1 January 2007 | 30 November 2008 | 68 | 36 | 22 | 10 | 52.94 |
| Songkhla United | 1 January 2012 | 30 November 2013 | 49 | 11 | 17 | 21 | 22.45 |
| Chainat | 1 January 2014 | 30 November 2014 | 27 | 7 | 10 | 10 | 25.93 |
| Chonburi | 1 January 2015 | 30 November 2015 | 44 | 21 | 12 | 11 | 47.73 |
| PTT Rayong | 8 January 2016 | 19 May 2016 | 15 | 5 | 4 | 6 | 33.33 |
| Port | 11 July 2016 | 21 June 2017 | 19 | 9 | 4 | 6 | 47.37 |
| Port | 20 September 2017 | 21 July 2019 | 71 | 39 | 11 | 21 | 54.93 |
| Port | 28 March 2020 | 20 September 2020 | 2 | 0 | 0 | 2 | 0.00 |
| Muangkan United | 25 January 2021 | 28 September 2021 | 14 | 6 | 3 | 5 | 42.86 |
| Port | 5 March 2022 | 31 May 2022 | 8 | 2 | 1 | 5 | 25.00 |
| Customs United | 28 June 2022 | 31 May 2023 | 41 | 19 | 7 | 15 | 46.34 |
| Thailand U17 | 30 May 2024 | 9 April 2025 | 11 | 6 | 2 | 3 | 54.55 |
| Kasetsart | 29 October 2026 | present | 4 | 0 | 1 | 3 | 0.00 |
| Total | | | 373 | 161 | 94 | 118 | 43.16 |

== Honours ==
=== Manager ===
Chonburi

- Thailand Premier League: 2007
- Thai FA Cup: 2010
- Kor Royal Cup: 2007, 2011

Muangkan United

- Thai League 3 runners-up: 2020–21

Individual

- Thailand Premier League Coach of the Year: 2007
- Thailand Premier League Coach of the Month: May 2010, August 2010, July 2015, February 2018, April 2019
