= Genki Nagasato =

Japanese footballer

Genki Nagasato 永里 源気
Personal information
- Full name: Genki Nagasato
- Date of birth: December 16, 1985 (age 40)
- Place of birth: Tokyo, Japan
- Height: 1.78 m (5 ft 10 in)
- Positions: Forward; midfielder

Team information
- Current team: Hayabusa Eleven
- Number: 14

Youth career
- Tokyo Verdy
- 2001–2003: Shonan Bellmare

Senior career*
Years	Team	Apps	(Gls)
2004–2008	Shonan Bellmare	102	(9)
2009	Tokyo Verdy	36	(2)
2010	Avispa Fukuoka	35	(15)
2011–2012	Ventforet Kofu	41	(4)
2011	→ FC Tokyo (loan)	8	(2)
2013	Gainare Tottori	34	(10)
2014–2015	Ratchaburi	63	(16)
2016–2017	Port	32	(5)
2018–2019	Tokyo United	17	(0)
2020–	Hayabusa Eleven		
Medal record
FC Tokyo
Winner	Emperor's Cup	2011
- * Club domestic league appearances and goals as of 19:04, 6 January 2021 (UTC)

Genki Nagasato (永里 源気, Nagasato Genki; born December 16, 1985) is a Japanese footballer who plays for Hayabusa Eleven FC. His sisters are Japan women's national team players Yuki Nagasato and Asano Nagasato.

He primarily plays as a left-winger but is capable of switching flanks to play on the right. Focused primarily on attacking he runs with the ball well and has an eye for goal, finishing as Avispa Fukuoka's top scorer in the 2010 season with 15 League goals.

== Club statistics ==
Club performance			League		Cup		League Cup		Total	
Season	Club	League	Apps	Goals	Apps	Goals	Apps	Goals	Apps	Goals
Japan			League		Emperor's Cup		J.League Cup		Total	
2004	Shonan Bellmare	J2 League	0	0	0	0	-		0	0
2005	Shonan Bellmare	J2 League	31	2	1	0	-		32	2
2006	Shonan Bellmare	J2 League	26	3	1	1	-		27	4
2007	Shonan Bellmare	J2 League	39	3	2	0	-		41	3
2008	Shonan Bellmare	J2 League	6	1	0	0	-		6	1
2009	Tokyo Verdy	J2 League	36	2	1	0	-		37	2
2010	Avispa Fukuoka	J2 League	35	15	3	0	-		38	15
2011	Ventforet Kofu	J1 League	14	0	-		2	0	16	0
2011	FC Tokyo	J2 League	8	2	0	0	-		8	2
2012	Ventforet Kofu	J2 League	27	4	1	0	-		28	4
2013	Gainare Tottori	J2 League	34	10	0	0	-		34	10
Total			256	42	9	1	2	0	267	43
