= Tana Chanabut =

Thai footballer

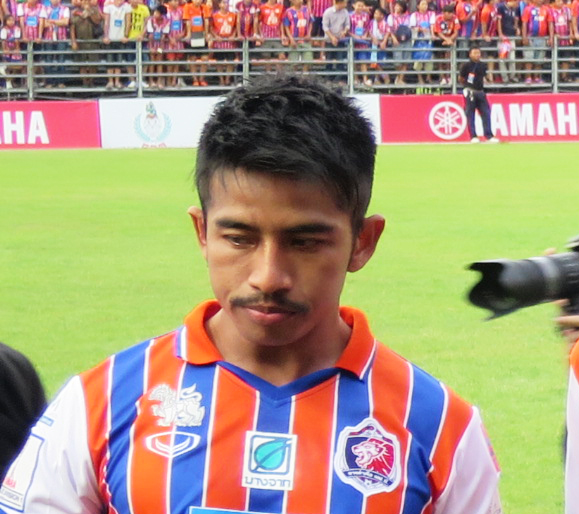

Personal information
- Full name: Tana Chanabut
- Date of birth: 6 June 1984 (age 42)
- Place of birth: Khon Kaen, Thailand
- Height: 1.68 m (5 ft 6 in)
- Positions: Forward; winger

Youth career
- 2000–2003: Bangkok Christian College

Senior career*
Years	Team	Apps	(Gls)
2004–2005	Thailand Tobacco Monopoly	18	(7)
2006–2007	PEA	24	(5)
2008–2011	Pattaya United	64	(20)
2008	→ Chonburi (loan)	11	(2)
2012	Esan United	17	(9)
2012–2016	Police United	97	(40)
2016–2018	Port	50	(8)
2018–2019	Nongbua Pitchaya	25	(3)
2019–2021	Khon Kaen United	19	(8)
2021–2022	Muang Loei United	6	(0)
Total		325	(102)

International career^{‡}
2003–2007	Thailand U23	9	(2)
2008–2016	Thailand	21	(3)

Managerial career
- 2021: Ubon Kruanapat
- 2022: Rajpracha
- 2023: Samut Prakan City
- 2024: Khon Kaen United
- 2024–2025: Khon Kaen United (assistant)
- 2025: Khon Kaen Mordindang (assistant)
- 2025–: Muang Loei United
Medal record
Thailand under-23
Sea Games
Gold medal – first place	Sea Games 2003	Football
Gold medal – first place	Sea Games 2007	Football
- * Club domestic league appearances and goals as of 13 November 2015 ‡ National team caps and goals as of 6 October 2016

Tana Chanabut (Thai: ธนา ชะนะบุตร; born June 6, 1984), simply known as Man (Thai: แมน) is a Thai professional football manager and former football player. He is currently head coach of Thai League 2 club Muang Loei United.

== International career ==
On 8 September 2015, he played for Thailand in the 2018 FIFA World Cup qualification (AFC) against Iraq.

== Managerial career ==
=== Early career ===
Tana started his coaching as a player-coach role when he was at Khon Kaen United.

=== Ubon Kruanapat ===
In June 2021, Tana was appointed as a manager for the first time for Ubon Kruanapat. However, he was sacked on 7 November 2021 after his team lost on 4 consecutive games.

=== Muang Loei United ===
In December 2021, he joined Muang Loei United as a player-coach role for the second time.

=== Khon Kaen United ===
On 30 April 2024, Tana was appointed as manager of Thai League 1 club Khon Kaen United following the dismissal of Ekalak Thong-am, with four matches left to play of the 2023–24 season. At his appointment, Khon Kaen United was in 10th place, five points outside the relegation zone. On 5 May 2024, Tana took charge for the first time as a Khon Kaen United manager for their Thai League 1 match against Bangkok United which ended in a 2–2 draw, thanks to a second-half equalizer from Brenner. Despite the draw, he stated he was pleased with the "attitude, passion, and the fighting spirit" of his players. On 19 May 2024, Tana got his first win as Khon Kaen United coach; a 5–1 win over Sukhothai.

== Style of play ==
Tana is known for his speed and acceleration.

== International ==
As of 11 October 2016

National team	Year	Apps	Goals
Thailand	2008	9	1
Thailand	2012	2	0
Thailand	2013	1	0
Thailand	2015	3	1
Thailand	2016	6	1
Total		21	3

== International goals ==
List of international goals scored by Tana Chanabut
No.	Date	Venue	Opponent	Score	Result	Competition
1.	March 15, 2008	Kunming, China	China	3–3	3–3	Friendly
2.	November 12, 2015	Bangkok, Thailand	Chinese Taipei	4–2	4–2	2018 FIFA World Cup qualification
3.	October 6, 2016	Abu Dhabi, United Arab Emirates	United Arab Emirates	1–2	1–3	2018 FIFA World Cup qualification

== Managerial statistics ==
As of match played 22 November 2026

Managerial record by team and tenure
Team	From	To	Record				
Team	From	To	P	W	D	L	Win %
Ubon Kruanapat	19 June 2021	7 November 2021	8	3	1	4	37.5
Rajpracha	3 August 2022	11 November 2022	15	6	5	4	40.0
Samut Prakan City	15 February 2023	27 November 2023	26	9	7	10	34.6
Khon Kaen United	30 April 2024	31 August 2024	8	1	2	5	12.5
Muang Loei United	5 July 2025	Present	23	8	6	9	34.8
Total			80	27	21	32	33.8

== Honours ==
=== Player ===
Thailand Tobacco Monopoly

- Thai Premier League: 2004–05

Police United

- Thai Division 1 League: 2015

Thailand U-23

- Sea Games Gold Medal: 2003, 2007

Thailand

- King's Cup: 2016

Individual

- Thai Division 1 League/Thai League 2 Top Scorer: 2015
