= Hamilton (footballer, born 1991) =

Brazilian footballer

Personal information
- Full name: Hamilton Soares de Sá
- Date of birth: 31 May 1991 (age 35)
- Place of birth: Manaus, Brazil
- Height: 1.91 m (6 ft 3 in)
- Position: Striker

Senior career*
Years	Team	Apps	(Gls)
2017	Princesa do Solimões	3	(0)
2018–2020	Manaus	28	(16)
2021	Kazma SC	0	(0)
2021–2022	Nongbua Pitchaya	28	(19)
2022–2024	Port	40	(25)
- * Club domestic league appearances and goals as of 25 December 2023

Hamilton Soares de Sá (born 31 May 1991) is a Brazilian professional footballer who plays as a striker.

== Honours ==
=== Individual ===
- Thai League 1 Top Scorer (1): 2021–22
