= Piyachat Srimarueang =

Thai footballer (born 1989)

Personal information
- Full name: Piyachat Srimarueang
- Date of birth: 11 January 1989 (age 37)
- Place of birth: Sisaket, Thailand
- Height: 1.70 m (5 ft 7 in)
- Position: Attacking midfielder

Youth career
- 2004–2007: Ratwinit Bangkaeo School

Senior career*
Years	Team	Apps	(Gls)
2007–2010	Osotspa	10	(2)
2009–2010	→ Prachinburi (loan)	18	(0)
2011–2012	Navy	34	(0)
2013	Trat	9	(0)
2013–2014	Ayutthaya	41	(8)
2015	Saraburi	27	(1)
2016	Sukhothai	18	(4)
2016–2017	Port	24	(1)
- * Club domestic league appearances and goals

Piyachat Srimarueang (Thai: ปิยะชาติ ศรีมะเรือง, born January 11, 1989), is a Thai retired professional footballer who played as an attacking midfielder.
