= Worawut Namvech =

Thai footballer (born 1995)

Personal information
- Full name: Worawut Namvech
- Date of birth: 4 July 1995 (age 31)
- Place of birth: Phuket, Thailand
- Height: 1.82 m (5 ft 11 1/2 in)
- Position: Centre back

Team information
- Current team: Ayutthaya United
- Number: 24

Youth career
- 2010–2012: Assumption College Thonburi

Senior career*
Years	Team	Apps	(Gls)
2013–2015	Bangkok Glass	0	(0)
2016–2019	Chiangrai United	21	(0)
2017	→ Sisaket (loan)	5	(0)
2018–2019	→ Port (loan)	2	(0)
2019	Chiangmai	3	(0)
2020	Nongbua Pitchaya	0	(0)
2020–2025	Port	56	(0)
2024–2025	→ Ratchaburi (loan)	9	(0)
2026–	Ayutthaya United	0	(0)

International career
2014	Thailand U19	8	(1)
2016	Thailand U21	2	(1)
2016–2018	Thailand U23	17	(1)
2021	Thailand	1	(0)
Medal record
Thailand under-23
Sea Games
Gold medal – first place	Sea Games 2017	Football
- * Club domestic league appearances and goals as of 27 June 2024

Worawut Namvech (Thai: วรวุฒิ นามเวช, born 4 July 1995) is a Thai professional footballer who plays as a centre back for Thai League 1 club Ayutthaya United and the Thailand national team.

== International career ==
In August 2017, he won the Football at the 2017 Southeast Asian Games with Thailand U23.

On 12 April 2021, He was named in manager Akira Nishino’s 47-man squad for Thailand’s 2022 World Cup qualification he play the friendly matches against Tajikistan.

== Honours ==
=== International ===
Thailand U-23

- Sea Games Gold Medal (1); 2017
- Dubai Cup (1) : 2017

Thailand U-21

- Nations Cup (1): 2016

=== Club ===
Chiangrai United

- Thailand Champions Cup (1): 2018
