= Todsapol Lated =

Thai footballer

Personal information
- Full name: Todsapol Lated
- Date of birth: 7 May 1989 (age 37)
- Place of birth: Ratchaburi, Thailand
- Height: 1.81 m (5 ft 11 1/2 in)
- Position: Centre back

Team information
- Current team: Lamphun Warriors
- Number: 6

Youth career
- 2007: Ratchaburi

Senior career*
Years	Team	Apps	(Gls)
2008–2010	Ratchaburi	28	(0)
2010–2011	Singhtarua	19	(0)
2011–2015	Muangthong United	54	(6)
2013	→ Singhtarua (loan)	32	(0)
2015–2021	Port	52	(3)
2021–2022	Chiangmai United	24	(2)
2022–	Lamphun Warriors	52	(2)

International career
2014	Thailand	1	(0)
- * Club domestic league appearances and goals as of 14:35, 25 February 2025 (UTC)

Todsapol Lated (Thai: ทศพล ลาเทศ, born May 7, 1989) is a Thai professional footballer who plays as a centre back for Thai League 1 club Lamphun Warriors.

== Club career ==
In 2012, he signed for Muangthong United, former 2 times Thai League 1 champions.

== International career ==
Todsapol received his first call up to the Thailand Under 23's and made his debut in a friendly match against Malaysia in January 2011. In September 2014, Todsapol was called up in a friendly match against Kuwait.

=== International ===
As of 28 March 2017

National team	Year	Apps	Goals
Thailand	2014	1	0
Thailand	Total	1	0

== Honours ==
=== Club ===
Thai Port

- Thai League Cup (1): 2010
- Thai FA Cup (1): 2019

Muangthong United

- Thai Premier League (1): 2012
