= Josimar (footballer, born 1987) =

Brazilian footballer

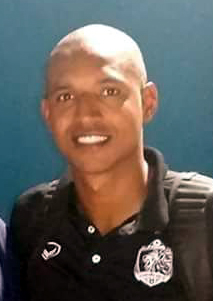

Personal information
- Full name: Josimar Rodrigues Souza Roberto
- Date of birth: August 16, 1987 (age 39)
- Place of birth: Ipatinga, Brazil
- Height: 1.83 m (6 ft 0 in)
- Position: Striker

Youth career
- 2003–2005: Ipatinga

Senior career*
Years	Team	Apps	(Gls)
2006	Ipatinga	0	(0)
2006–2008	Ventforet Kofu	15	(0)
2007	→ Ehime FC (loan)	21	(8)
2009–2011	Ehime FC	33	(7)
2012	Tokyo Verdy	16	(1)
2013	Lajeadense	0	(0)
2014–2015	Al-Fateh SC	12	(1)
2016	Army United	30	(16)
2017	Port	28	(13)
2018	CSA	9	(1)
2018	PTT Rayong	13	(10)
2019	Police Tero	15	(11)
2019	Port	15	(5)
- * Club domestic league appearances and goals as of 13 February 2018

Josimar Rodrigues Souza Roberto, or simply Josimar (born August 16, 1987), is a Brazilian striker .

== Club statistics ==
Club performance			League		Cup		League Cup		Total	
Season	Club	League	Apps	Goals	Apps	Goals	Apps	Goals	Apps	Goals
Japan			League		Emperor's Cup		J.League Cup		Total	
2006	Ventforet Kofu	J1 League	0	0	1	2	0	0	1	2
2007	Ventforet Kofu	J1 League	2	0	0	0	5	0	7	0
2007	Ehime FC	J2 League	21	8	3	0	-		24	8
2008	Ventforet Kofu	J2 League	13	5	0	0	-		13	5
2009	Ehime FC	J2 League	33	7	0	0	-		33	7
2010	Ehime FC	J2 League								
Country	Japan		69	20	4	2	5	0	78	22
Total			69	20	4	2	5	0	78	22
