= Rattanai Songsangchan =

Thai footballer

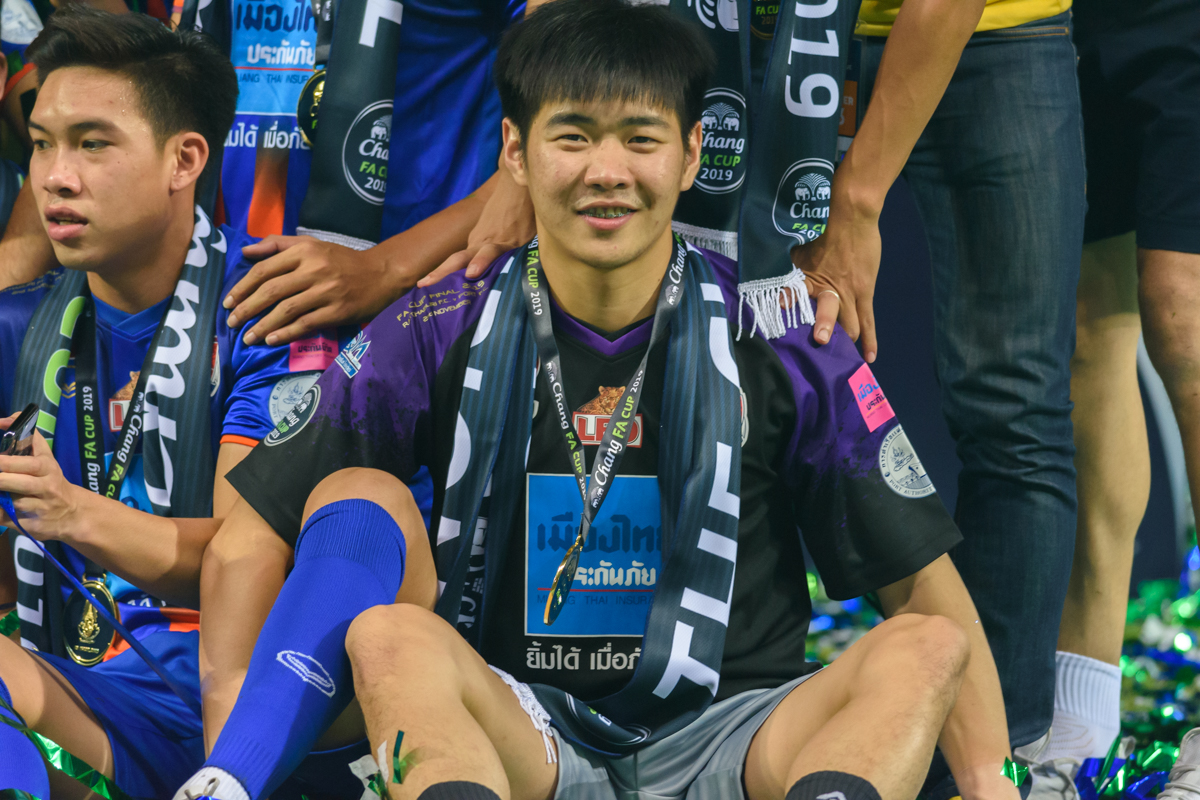

Personal information
- Full name: Rattanai Songsangchan
- Date of birth: 10 June 1995 (age 31)
- Place of birth: Bangkok, Thailand
- Height: 1.80 m (5 ft 11 in)
- Position: Goalkeeper

Team information
- Current team: PT Prachuap
- Number: 1

Youth career
- 2010–2013: Police United

Senior career*
Years	Team	Apps	(Gls)
2013–2015	Police United	15	(0)
2013	→ Look Esan (loan)	26	(0)
2016–2023	Port	60	(0)
2023–	PT Prachuap	27	(0)
2024	→ Ratchaburi (loan)	1	(0)

International career
2013–2014	Thailand U19	12	(0)
2015–2018	Thailand U23	4	(0)
- * Club domestic league appearances and goals

Rattanai Songsangchan (Thai: รัตนัย ส่องแสงจันทร์, born 10 June 1995) simply known as Pure (Thai: เพียว) is a Thai professional footballer who plays as a goalkeeper for Thai League 1 club PT Prachuap.

== International career ==
In 2016 Rattanai was selected in Thailand U23 squad for 2016 AFC U-23 Championship in Qatar.

== Honours ==
=== Club ===
Thai Airways-Look Isan

- Regional League Eastern Division (1): 2013

Port

- Thai FA Cup (1): 2019
