= Dragan Bošković =

Montenegrin footballer

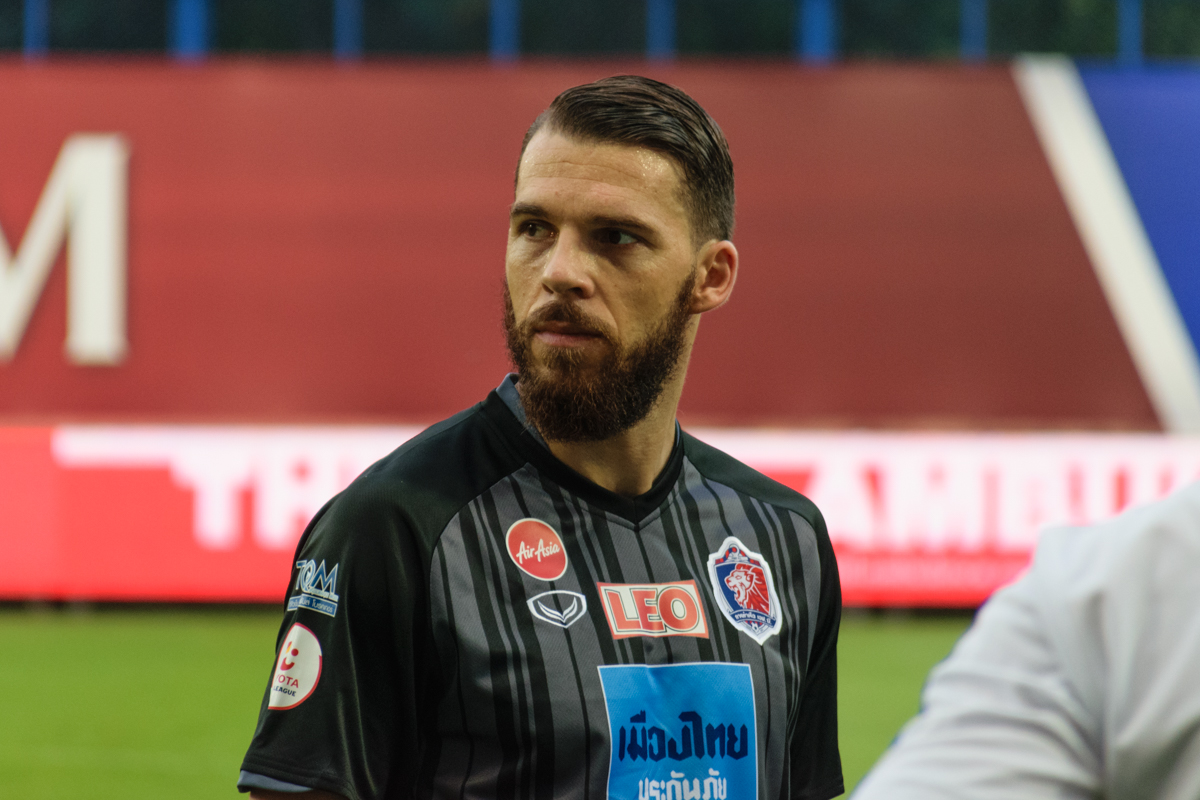

Personal information
- Full name: Dragan Bošković
- Date of birth: 27 December 1985 (age 40)
- Place of birth: Berane, SFR Yugoslavia
- Height: 1.85 m (6 ft 1 in)
- Position: Striker

Senior career*
Years	Team	Apps	(Gls)
2004–2009	Grbalj	10	(1)
2009–2012	Budućnost Podgorica	100	(32)
2013–2014	Suphanburi	38	(12)
2015–2017	Bangkok United	95	(71)
2018–2019	Port	48	(26)
2020	Chonburi	13	(4)
2020–2021	Police Tero	15	(5)
Total		319	(151)

International career
2012	Montenegro	1	(0)
- * Club domestic league appearances and goals as of 26 February 2018

Dragan Bošković (born 27 December 1985) is a Montenegrin retired footballer who played as a striker. From 2013 until his retirement, he played for five different clubs in Thai League 1, earning more appearances in the league than any other European player.

== Club career ==
Bošković joined Port from Bangkok United in January 2018. On 10 January 2020 Dragan signed for Chonburi.

== International career ==
In 2012, Bošković debuted for Montenegro in a friendly match against Iceland, coming on in the final minute of the game. This remained his only international cap.
