= Polwat Pinkong =

Thai footballer (born 1987)

Personal information
- Full name: Polwat Pinkong
- Date of birth: 27 March 1987 (age 39)
- Place of birth: Phitsanulok, Thailand
- Height: 1.80 m (5 ft 11 in)
- Position: Left-back

Team information
- Current team: Phitsanulok
- Number: 7

Youth career
- 2004–2006: Suankularb Wittayalai School

Senior career*
Years	Team	Apps	(Gls)
2007–2017	Bangkok United	40	(0)
2016	→ Super Power (loan)	29	(2)
2017	→ Port (loan)	28	(1)
2018–2019	Port	12	(0)
2020	Nongbua Pitchaya	1	(0)
2020	Sukhothai	1	(0)
2021–2022	STK Muangnont	20	(1)
2023–2024	Uttaradit Saksiam	27	(1)
2024–2025	Phitsanulok Unity	16	(1)
2025	Chattrakan City	9	(0)
2026–	Phitsanulok	10	(1)
- * Club domestic league appearances and goals as of 30 March 2026

Polwat Pinkong (Thai: พลวัฒน์ ปิ่นกอง, born March 27, 1987), or simply known as Kew (Thai: คิว), is a Thai professional footballer who plays as a left-back.

== Honours ==
Port

- Thai FA Cup (1) : 2019
