= Siwakorn Jakkuprasat =

Thai footballer (born 1992)

Personal information
- Full name: Siwakorn Jakkuprasat
- Date of birth: 23 April 1992 (age 34)
- Place of birth: Bangkok, Thailand
- Height: 1.74 m (5 ft 9 in)
- Position: Midfielder

Team information
- Current team: Ratchaburi
- Number: 16

Youth career
- 2009–2010: Thai Port

Senior career*
Years	Team	Apps	(Gls)
2011–2012	Thai Port	24	(2)
2013–2015	Muangthong United	25	(0)
2014	→ Police United (loan)	11	(0)
2015–2023	Port	150	(12)
2022–2023	→ Customs United (loan)	14	(0)
2023–	Ratchaburi	49	(1)

International career
2012–2015	Thailand U23	2	(0)
Medal record
Men's football
Representing Thailand
SEA Games
Gold medal – first place	2015 Singapore	Team
- * Club domestic league appearances and goals as of 9 January 2026

Siwakorn Jakkuprasat (Thai: ศิวกร จักขุประสาท; born 23 April 1992), is a Thai professional footballer who plays as a midfielder for Thai League 1 club Ratchaburi. His goal during the Thai League Week 11 against PT Prachuap is considered one of the top 5 goals of the round in an article by FOX Sports Asia.

== International career ==
In June 2019 he was in the squad of Thailand for 2019 King's Cup, but did not make an appearance.

== Honours ==
International

Thailand U-23

- SEA Games Gold Medal (1); 2015

Club

Port

- Thai FA Cup (1): 2019
