= Worawut Srisupha =

Thai footballer (born 1992)

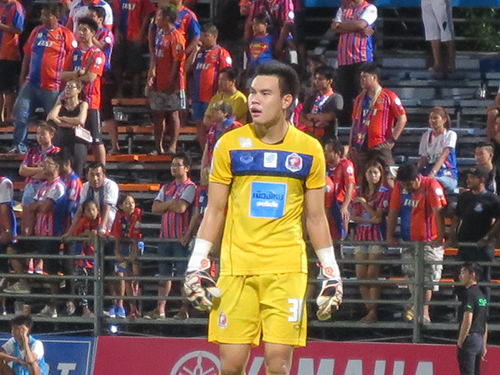

Personal information
- Full name: Worawut Srisupha
- Date of birth: 25 May 1992 (age 34)
- Place of birth: Bangkok, Thailand
- Height: 1.80 m (5 ft 11 in)
- Position: Goalkeeper

Team information
- Current team: Rayong
- Number: 36

Youth career
- 2009–2010: BEC Tero Sasana

Senior career*
Years	Team	Apps	(Gls)
2010–2013	BEC Tero Sasana	2	(0)
2012–2013	→ Bangkok (loan)	58	(0)
2014	Bangkok	34	(0)
2015–	Port	143	(0)
2025–	→ Rayong (loan)	6	(0)
- * Club domestic league appearances and goals as of 2 February 2025

Worawut Srisupha (Thai: วรวุฒิ ศรีสุภา, born May 25, 1992), or formerly Worawut Kaewpook (Thai: วรวุฒิ แก้วผูก) is a Thai professional footballer who plays as a goalkeeper for Thai League 1 club Rayong and the Thailand national team.

== International career ==
In March, 2019 he was in the squad of Thailand for 2019 China Cup, but did not make an appearance.

On 12 April 2021, He was named in manager Akira Nishino’s 47-man squad for Thailand’s 2022 World Cup qualification.

== Honour ==
Port

- Thai FA Cup (1): 2019
