= Nurul Sriyankem =

Thai footballer (born 1992)

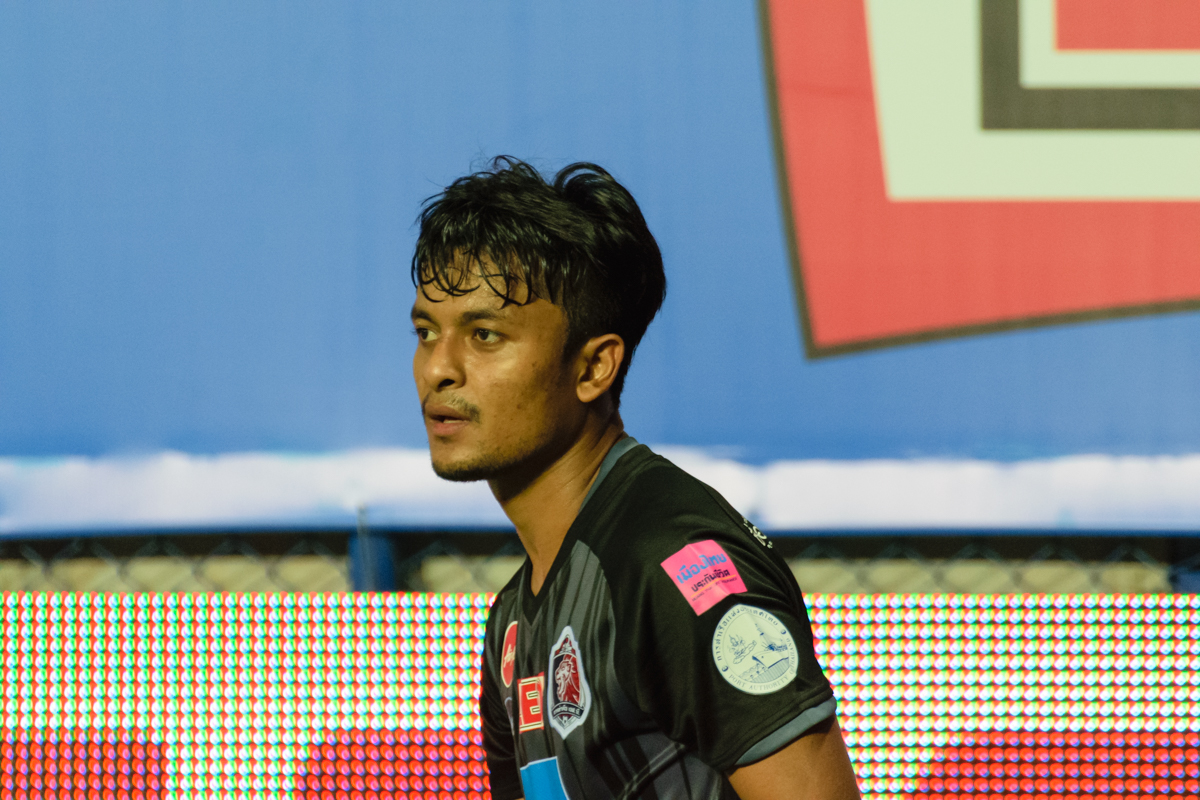

Personal information
- Full name: Nurul Sriyankem
- Date of birth: 8 February 1992 (age 34)
- Place of birth: Phatthalung, Thailand
- Height: 1.63 m (5 ft 4 in)
- Position: Winger

Team information
- Current team: Navy
- Number: 31

Youth career
- 2004–2006: Assumption College Sriracha
- 2007–2010: Chonburi

Senior career*
| Years | Team | Apps | (Gls) |
| 2010–2017 | Chonburi | 115 | (21) |
| 2013 | → Chiangrai United (loan) | 12 | (6) |
| 2018–2024 | Port | 78 | (12) |
| 2020 | → Ratchaburi Mitr Phol (loan) | 6 | (0) |
| 2023 | → Customs United (loan) | 19 | (2) |
| 2024 | → Chonburi (loan) | 8 | (0) |
| 2024–2025 | Chiangmai United | 22 | (4) |
| 2025– | Navy | 19 | (6) |

International career^{‡}
| 2012–2015 | Thailand U23 | 11 | (5) |
| 2014–2018 | Thailand | 15 | (0) |
Medal record
Thailand under-23
Sea Games
| Gold medal – first place | Sea Games 2015 | Football |
- * Club domestic league appearances and goals as of 13 June 2024 ‡ National team caps and goals as of 5 December 2018

Nurul Sriyankem (Thai: นูรูล ศรียานเก็ม; RTGS: Nurun Siyankem, born 8 February 1992), simply known as Nu (Thai: นู), is a Thai professional footballer who plays as a winger for Navy in Thai League 3.

== International career ==
He represented Thailand U23 in the 2014 Asian Games. Nurul is also part of Thailand's squad in the 2014 AFF Suzuki Cup. In May 2015, he was called up by Thailand to play in the 2018 FIFA World Cup qualification (AFC) against Vietnam. He won the 2015 Southeast Asian Games with Thailand U23. In 2018 he was called up by Thailand national team for the 2018 AFF Suzuki Cup.

== Honours ==
=== Club ===
Port

- Thai FA Cup (1): 2019

=== International ===
Thailand U-23

- SEA Games Gold Medal (1); 2015
