= Kevin Deeromram =

Thai footballer (born 1997)

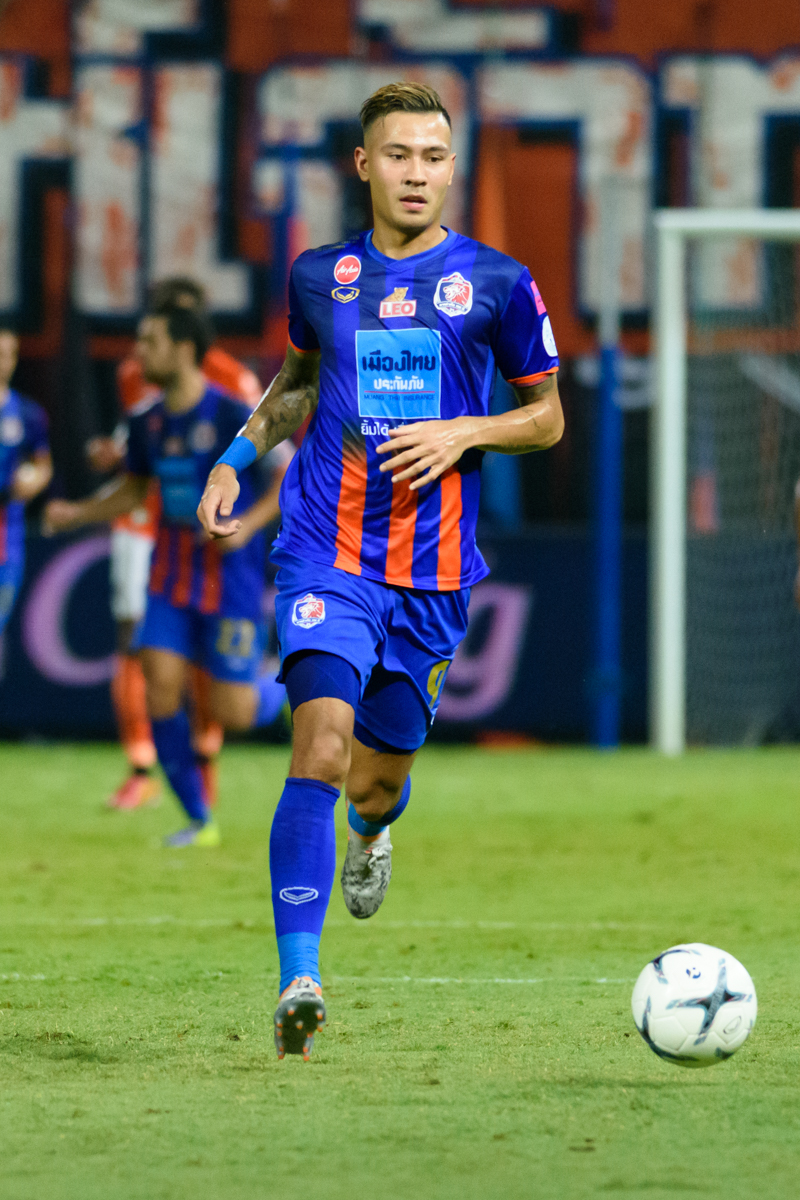
- Deeromram playing for Port in 2019

Personal information
- Full name: Kevin Deeromram
- Date of birth: 11 September 1997 (age 29)
- Place of birth: Stockholm, Sweden
- Height: 1.83 m (6 ft 0 in)
- Position: Left-back

Team information
- Current team: Ratchaburi
- Number: 23

Youth career
- 2012–2015: Djurgårdens
- 2015: → Werder Bremen (loan)

Senior career*
Years	Team	Apps	(Gls)
2016–2017	Djurgårdens	0	(0)
2016	→ Åtvidaberg (loan)	25	(0)
2017–2018	Ratchaburi	28	(1)
2018–2025	Port	150	(11)
2025	Selangor	6	(2)
2025–	Ratchaburi	10	(0)

International career^{‡}
2014	Sweden U17	2	(0)
2014	Sweden U18	1	(0)
2015–2016	Sweden U19	6	(0)
2017	Thailand U23	4	(0)
2017–	Thailand	5	(0)
Medal record
Representing Thailand
Southeast Asian Games
Gold medal – first place	Sea Games 2017	Football
- * Club domestic league appearances and goals as of 05:57, 30 April 2026 (UTC) ‡ National team caps and goals as of 13 November 2025

Kevin Deeromram (Thai: เควิน ดีรมรัมย์, RTGS: Khewin Diromram; born 11 September 1997) is a professional footballer who plays as a left-back for Thai League 1 club Ratchaburi. Born in Sweden, he plays for the Thailand national team.

== Club career ==
=== Djurgårdens ===
Deeromram started his career with Djurgårdens youth team in 2012 where he was loaned out to Werder Bremen youth team in February 2015.

==== Åtvidaberg (loan) ====
On 24 March 2016, Deeromram was loaned out to Swedish second division club Åtvidaberg where he make his professional career debut on 2 April in a 2–1 lost to Varbergs BoIS. He ended his loan spell with the club in November 2016 where he recorded 6 assists in 26 matches in all competition for Åtvidaberg.

=== Ratchaburi ===
On 9 January 2017, Deeromram moved to Southeast Asia to joined with Thai League 1 club Ratchaburi. He make his debut for the club where he assisted Noppol Pol-udom to score the only goal against BEC Tero Sasana on 12 March. Deeromram scored his first career goal in a 6–2 thrashing win against Super Power Samut Prakan.

=== Port ===
After an impressing season with Ratchaburi, Deeromram moved to another Thailand club Port on 5 February 2018. He make his debut for the club in a 2–0 win over Pattaya United on 11 February. Deeromran than helped Port to win the 2019 Thai FA Cup against his former club Ratchaburi on 2 November 2019.

On 19 September 2024, Deeromram make his AFC Champions League Two debut against Indonesian club Persib Bandung where he assisted Willen Mota to score the only goal in the match. Deeromram also recorded another assist to Felipe Amorim who went on to score the only goal in the match against Chinese club Zhejiang Professional on 24 October.

Deeromram then played his last match for Port in the 2025 Piala Presiden final against EFL Championship club Oxford United where the club ended up winning against the English team in an official match. He left the club after scoring 13 goals and contributing 42 assists in 180 appearances in all matches.

=== Selangor ===
On 27 July 2025, Deeromram signed with Malaysia Super League club Selangor. He make his debut on 8 August against Johor Darul Ta'zim. In his next match, he scored a brace in a 3–0 win over DPMM.

== International career ==
On 6 June 2017, Deeromram made the debut for Thailand in the friendly match against Uzbekistan.

In March 2022, he was called up by Thailand for the friendly match against Nepal and Suriname.

== Personal life ==
Deeromram was born in Stockholm to a Swedish father and a Thai mother from Buriram.

== Career statistics ==
As of 13 November 2025

National team	Year	Apps	Goals
Thailand	2017	1	0
Thailand	2022	2	0
Thailand	2023	1	0
Thailand	2025	1	0
Total		5	0

== Honours ==
Port

- Thai FA Cup: 2019
- Piala Presiden: 2025

Thailand U23

- Sea Games: 2017
