= David Rochela =

Spanish footballer (born 1990)

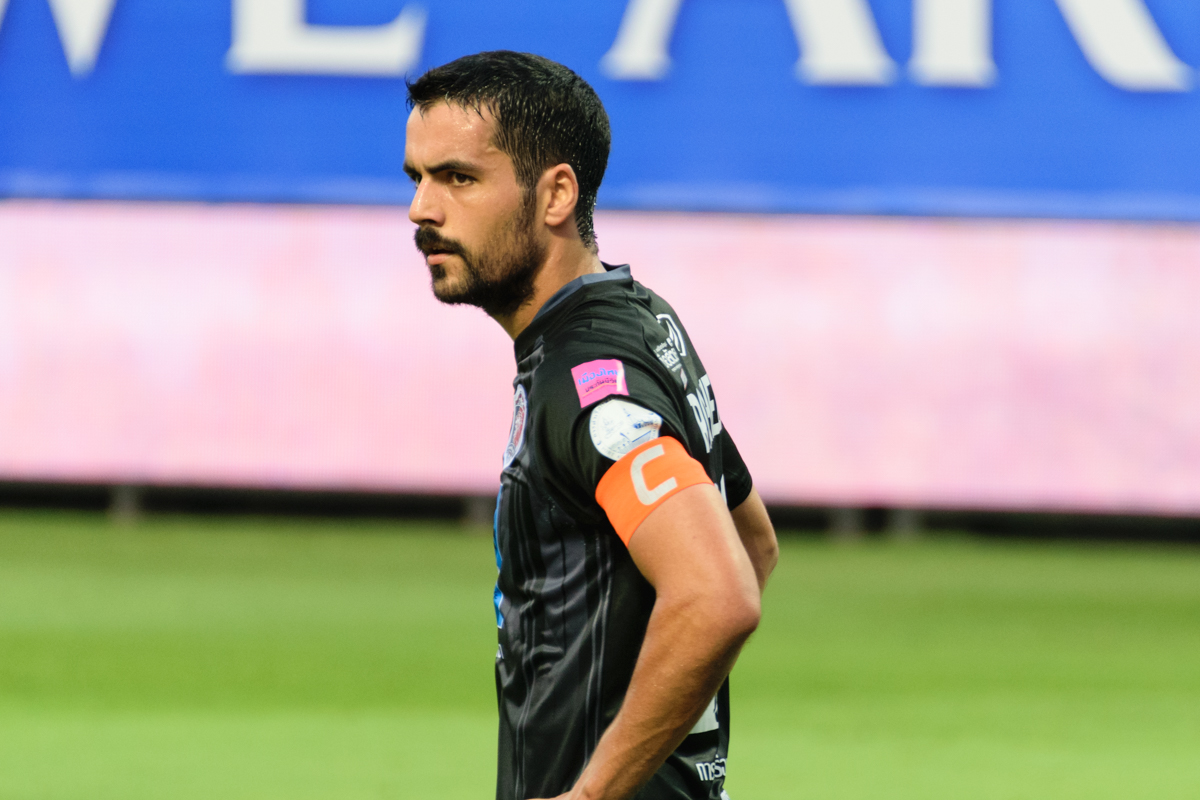
- Rochela playing for Port in 2018

Personal information
- Full name: David Rochela Calvo
- Date of birth: 19 February 1990 (age 36)
- Place of birth: As Pontes, Spain
- Height: 1.80 m (5 ft 11 in)
- Position: Centre-back

Youth career
- Deportivo La Coruña

Senior career*
Years	Team	Apps	(Gls)
2008–2011	Deportivo B	57	(0)
2010–2013	Deportivo La Coruña	9	(0)
2012	→ Racing Santander (loan)	12	(0)
2013	→ Hapoel Tel Aviv (loan)	13	(0)
2014–2015	Buriram United	37	(5)
2015	→ Port (loan)	16	(3)
2016–2023	Port	100	(19)
Total		244	(27)

International career
2005	Spain U16	1	(0)
2007	Spain U17	15	(0)
2008–2009	Spain U19	13	(1)
Medal record
Men's football
Representing Spain
U-17 World Cup
Runner-up	2007 Korea
European U-17 Championship
Winner	2007 Belgium
- * Club domestic league appearances and goals

David Rochela Calvo (born 19 February 1990) is a Spanish former professional footballer who played as a central defender.

Brought up at Deportivo La Coruña, he made 18 appearances including in La Liga and the Segunda División, also representing Racing de Santander in the latter. He spent most of his career in the Thai League 1, winning honours at Buriram United and Port.

== Club career ==
=== Deportivo ===
Born in As Pontes de García Rodríguez, Galicia, Rochela began his career at local Deportivo de La Coruña, initially for the reserve team in the Segunda División B. He was one of several new faces called up by first-team manager Miguel Ángel Lotina for a Copa del Rey quarter-final second leg on 27 January 2010 against Sevilla FC, who had won the first match 3–0; he debuted as a 70th-minute substitute for Juca in an inconsequential 1–0 away victory.

Rochela made his La Liga bow on 24 April 2010, as a half-time replacement for the injured Piscu in a 1–0 loss at Valencia CF. He then started the next three games in the closing stages of the season.

Rochela barely played in the next two years, as Deportivo were relegated and then promoted as champions of Segunda División. On 20 July 2012, with three years remaining on his Depor contract, he was loaned to newly-relegated Racing de Santander. He spent the second half of that campaign in his first foreign experience, at Hapoel Tel Aviv F.C. in the Israeli Premier League.

=== Thailand ===
Rochela moved to Thai Premier League champions Buriram United F.C. where he won the Kor Royal Cup in February 2014 with a 1–0 win over Muangthong United FC. On 2 November that year, he scored a penalty in a 2–1 home defeat of Police United F.C. to retain the title.

On 9 July 2021, Rochela scored again from the spot in a 5–1 Port F.C. victory at Guangzhou F.C. in the group stage of the AFC Champions League. It was his first goal in a continental competition.

In May 2023, Rochela announced his retirement at age 33.

== International career ==
Rochela was part of the Spain squad at the 2007 UEFA European Under-17 Championship, winning the tournament in Belgium. The same year, they finished second at the FIFA World Cup held in South Korea.

== Career statistics ==
As of 21 October 2014

Club	Season	League			Cup		Continental		Total	
Club	Season	Division	Apps	Goals	Apps	Goals	Apps	Goals	Apps	Goals
Deportivo	2009–10	La Liga	4	0	1	0	—		5	0
Deportivo	2010–11	La Liga	2	0	4	0	—		6	0
Deportivo	Total		6	0	5	0	—		11	0
Deportivo B	2010–11	Segunda División B	25	0	0	0	—		25	0
Deportivo B	Total		25	0	0	0	—		25	0
Deportivo	2011–12	Segunda División	3	0	4	0	—		7	0
Deportivo	Total		3	0	4	0	—		7	0
Racing Santander	2012–13	Segunda División	12	0	2	0	—		14	0
Racing Santander	Total		12	0	2	0	—		14	0
Hapoel Tel Aviv	2012–13	Israeli Premier League	13	0	0	0	—		13	0
Hapoel Tel Aviv	Total		13	0	0	0	—		13	0
Buriram United	2014	Thai Premier League	36	4	10	2	6	0	52	6
Buriram United	Total		36	4	10	2	6	0	52	6
Career total			95	4	21	2	6	0	122	6

== Honours ==
Deportivo

- Segunda División: 2011–12

Buriram United

- Thai Premier League: 2014
- Kor Royal Cup: 2014

Port

- Thai FA Cup: 2019

Spain U17

- UEFA European Under-17 Championship: 2007
- FIFA U-17 World Cup runner-up: 2007
