= Sergio Suárez =

Spanish footballer (born 1987)

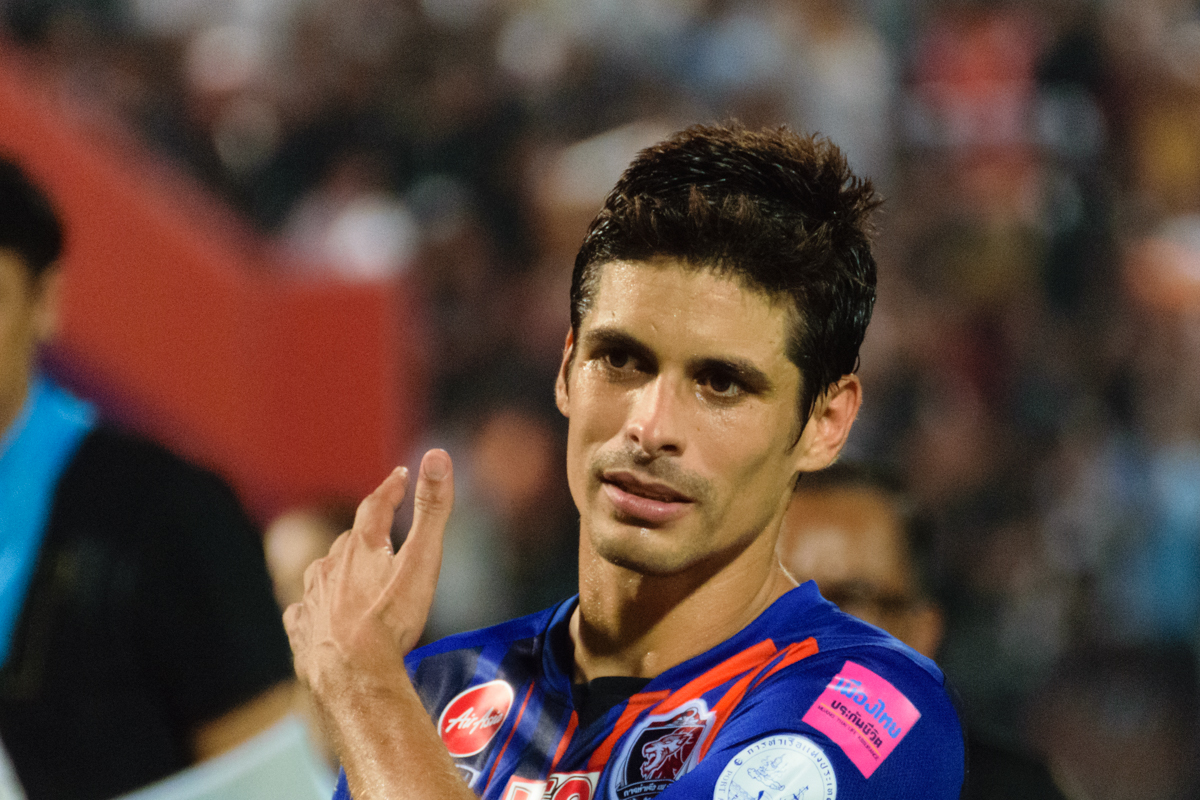
- Suárez with Port in 2018

Personal information
- Full name: Sergio Gustavo Suárez Arteaga
- Date of birth: 6 January 1987 (age 39)
- Place of birth: Las Palmas, Spain
- Height: 1.80 m (5 ft 11 in)
- Position: Midfielder

Youth career
- Las Palmas

Senior career*
Years	Team	Apps	(Gls)
2005–2007	Las Palmas B	29	(10)
2005–2006	→ Castillo (loan)	24	(0)
2007–2013	Las Palmas	125	(15)
2013	→ Mirandés (loan)	10	(0)
2014	Police United	22	(6)
2015–2016	Songkhla United	55	(15)
2017–2023	Port	145	(61)
2023–2026	Tamaraceite	48	(10)
- * Club domestic league appearances and goals as of 22:24, 5 August 2026 (UTC)

Sergio Gustavo Suárez Arteaga (born 6 January 1987) is a Spanish professional footballer who plays as a midfielder.

== Club career ==
Born in Las Palmas, Canary Islands, Suárez came through local UD Las Palmas' youth system, making his senior debut with neighbouring Castillo CF whilst on loan. Upon his return, he then spent one full season with the B team in the Tercera División. On 14 November 2007, he made his first official appearance for the main squad, starting and scoring from a penalty kick in a 2–4 home loss to Villarreal CF in the Copa del Rey.

Over the course of the following six campaigns, with the club always in the Segunda División, Suárez was regularly played, his first game in the competition taking place on 8 December 2007 as he came on as a 60th-minute substitute in the 1–0 home win against SD Eibar. On 15 May 2011, he was one of three players on target in a 5–3 victory at FC Barcelona B which all but certified the team's permanence.

Suárez was loaned to fellow second-tier side CD Mirandés midway through 2012–13 and, when he returned to Las Palmas for the following season, was not even given a jersey number. He went on to spend several years in the Thai Premier League, starting out with Police United FC.

== Personal life ==
Suárez's twin brother, Francisco, was also a footballer and a midfielder, and both played mostly for Las Palmas during their careers.

== Honours ==
Port

- Thai FA Cup: 2019

Individual

- Thai League 1 Best XI: 2020–21
