= Pakorn Prempak =

Thai footballer (born 1993)

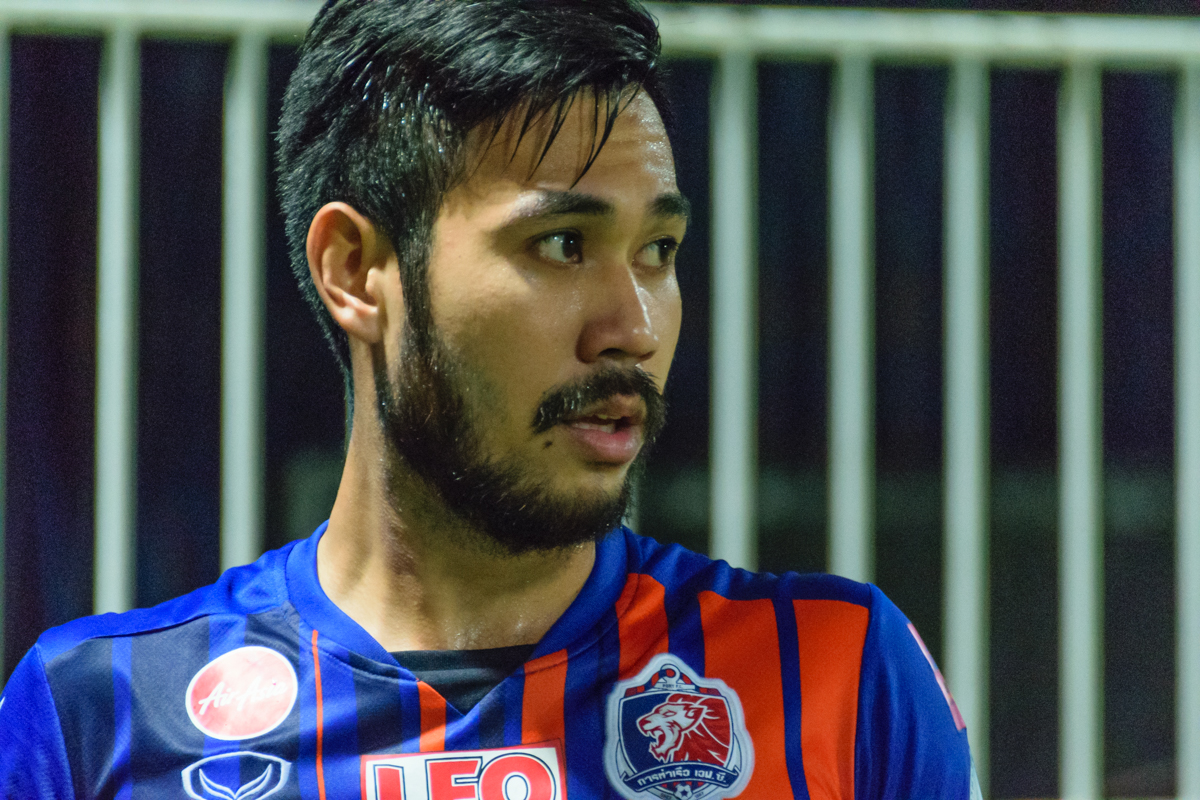
- Pakorn playing for Port in 2018

Personal information
- Full name: Pakorn Prempak
- Date of birth: 2 February 1993 (age 33)
- Place of birth: Saraburi, Thailand
- Height: 1.75 m (5 ft 9 in)
- Position: Winger

Team information
- Current team: Muangthong United
- Number: 7

Youth career
- 2010–2011: Police United

Senior career*
| Years | Team | Apps | (Gls) |
| 2011–2016 | Police United | 77 | (14) |
| 2016–2025 | Port | 219 | (24) |
| 2025–2026 | Police Tero | 14 | (1) |
| 2026– | Muangthong United | 0 | (0) |

International career^{‡}
| 2011–2012 | Thailand U19 | 5 | (4) |
| 2013–2016 | Thailand U23 | 18 | (8) |
| 2013–2018 | Thailand | 9 | (0) |
Medal record
Thailand under-19
AFF U-19 Youth Championship
| Winner | AFF U-19 Youth Championship 2011 | Football |
Thailand under-23
Sea Games
| Gold medal – first place | Sea Games 2013 | Football |
| Gold medal – first place | Sea Games 2015 | Football |
- * Club domestic league appearances and goals as of 18 May 2026 ‡ National team caps and goals as of 9 June 2022

Pakorn Prempak (Thai: ปกรณ์ เปรมภักดิ์; born 2 February 1993), simply known as Bas (Thai: บาส), is a Thai professional footballer who plays as a winger for Thailand national team.

== Club career ==
In January 2016, Pakorn joined Port. On 24 November 2017, Pakorn signed a nine-years contract deal with the club until June 2026.

== International career ==
Pakorn played for Thailand U19, and played in the 2012 AFC U-19 Championship qualification. He debuted for the first team against win China 5-1 in 2013. Pakorn scored a goal against Faroe Islands for Thailand U23. Pakorn was part of Thailand Selected Team which competed in the 2013 Merdeka Tournament. Pakorn scored the winning goal against Singapore U23 in the tournament. He represented Thailand U23 in the 2013 Southeast Asian Games. He represented Thailand U23 in the 2014 Asian Games. Pakorn won the 2015 Southeast Asian Games with Thailand U23.

In 2018 he was called up by Thailand national team for the 2018 AFF Suzuki Cup.

== Honours ==
=== Club ===
Port

- Thai FA Cup: 2019
- Piala Presiden: 2025

=== International ===
Thailand U-19

- AFF U-19 Youth Championship: 2011

Thailand U-23

- Sea Games Gold Medal: 2013, 2015

=== Individual ===
- Thai League 1 Top Assists: 2021–22
