= Port F.C. =

Thai football club, based in Bangkok

Port การท่าเรือ เอฟซี
- Full name: Port Football Club สโมสรฟุตบอลการท่าเรือ
- Nickname: Port Lions
- Founded: 1967; 59 years ago as Port Authority of Thailand; 2009; 17 years ago as Port
- Ground: PAT Stadium; Klong Toei, Bangkok, Thailand
- Capacity: 6,250
- Owner(s): Muang Thai Insurance; Port Authority of Thailand
- Chairman: Chalermchoke Lamsam
- Head coach: Božidar Bandović
- League: Thai League
- 2025–26: Thai League, Runners-up
- Website: portfcofficial.com
Home colours	Away colours	Third colours

Port Football Club (Thai: สโมสรฟุตบอลการท่าเรือ), also known as Thai Port (formerly known as Port Authority of Thailand Football Club or Port Authority, after its namesake owner), is a Thai professional football club based in Khlong Toei district of central Bangkok that currently competes in the Thai League 1, the top flight division in Thailand.

Alongside Buriram United and Muangthong United, Port is one of the most successful clubs in Thai football, having won three FA Cups, two League Cups, eight Kor Royal Cups and the Queen's Cup on six occasions. Port also came close to winning the top flight league, finishing as runners-up in 1999 and again in 2025-2026.

== History ==
=== Club foundation (1967–1968) ===
The club was founded in 1967 as Port Authority of Thailand Football Club by Major Prachuap Suntranakul, who was the director of Port Authority of Thailand at the time. He took on the role of chairman of Port Authority of Thailand and was instrumental in helping the club during its initial years.

=== Golden age (1968–1980) ===
In 1968, Port Authority were crowned Kor Royal Cup winners, which sparked the most successful era in the club's history as they went on to win six Kor Royal Cup titles between 1968 and 1979. Port also had plenty of success in the Queen's Cup, winning it four times in succession from 1977 to 1980. Following the 1980 Queen's Cup win, Port Authority of Thailand won four trophies in 13 years.

=== Development of club's name and cup champions (2009–2010) ===
At the start of the 2009 Thai Premier League season, the club changed its name from Port Authority to Thai Port Football Club. The name change was introduced to be in line with the new Football Association of Thailand regulations that meant all teams in the top flight must be registered as limited companies.

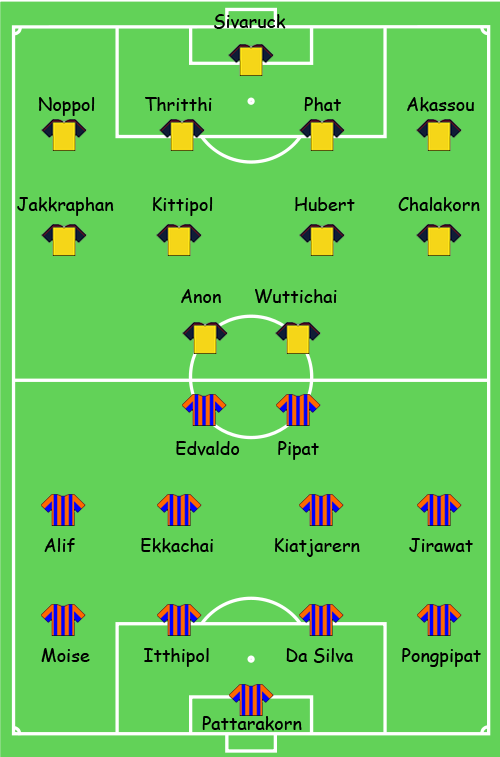
Lineups of the 2009 Thai FA Cup Final between Port and BEC Tero Sasana

==== Thai FA Cup champions ====
In the same year, Port ended a 16-year wait for a trophy when they were victorious in the 2009 Thai FA Cup final, where their opponents on 23 October 2009 at the Suphachalasai Stadium were BEC Tero Sasana. The match finished 1–1 after extra time, where Edvaldo scored a goal, which saw the match advance to a penalty shootout where Port won 5–4. Pipat Thonkanya scored the decisive spot kick after Thai Port keeper Pattarakorn saved BEC Tero Sasana's fifth penalty.

In the next season, Port performed a miracle in the 2010 Thai League Cup, advancing all the way to the final and facing off against Buriram United on 21 November 2010. Port became champion of the Thai League Cup after defeating their opponent 2–1. Thai Port also qualified to the 2010 AFC Cup, where they were drawn in Group H alongside Vietnamese club SHB Đà Nẵng, Singaporean club Geylang United and Hong Kong club Tai Po. On 17 March 2010, Thai Port registered their first continental win after Pitipong Kuldilok scored the only goal in the match against Tai Po at the Tseung Kwan O Sports Ground. Port finished the group stage as runners-up, thus qualifying to the round of 16. There, they faced off against Indonesian club Sriwijaya, and thrashed their opponent 4–1, thus qualifying to the quarter-finals. Thai Port was drawn against Kuwaiti club Al-Qadsia but suffered a 3–0 defeat in the second leg at the Mohammed Al-Hamad Stadium, thus knocking them out from the competition.

=== Darkest period (2011–2015) ===
The Port Authority of Thailand has been granted the rights to operate Port in the Thai Premier League.

The Football Association of Thailand or the FAT and the Thai Premier League ruled on a legal dispute between the Port Authority of Thailand and the Thai Port Company, over the operating rights of the Thai Premier League's Port. According to the ruling, the Port Authority of Thailand, the club's original owner, was granted operating rights of the team for the 2011–12 Thai Premier League season. The FAT claimed its decision was based on the fact that the club's ownership was never officially signed over to the Thai Port Company.

Meanwhile, President of Thai Port Company, Pichet Munkong, threatened to file a civil lawsuit in the court of law, citing Thai Premier League regulations which say that a state enterprise such as the Port Authority of Thailand is prohibited from operating a football club.

Pichet is planning to sue the FAT, the Thai Premier League, and the Asian Football Confederation.

However, Port will only be permitted to compete in the upcoming season of the country's top flight league, set to begin on 12 February once its operator is registered as a for-profit corporation.

It remains unclear how the Port Authority of Thailand is planning to proceed with this matter.

The ongoing boardroom disputes took their toll as Thai Port dropped to Division 1 for the first time in 2012. Investment in the team was not forthcoming as several departing players were replaced with lower quality ones. Thai Port failed to find the back of the net in almost half of their league games and were relegated on the penultimate round of fixtures when they lost 2–1 at home to Muangthong United. As Port was relegated to the 2013 Thai Division 1 League, the club was renamed to Singhtarua. They finished the season as runners-up, thus earning promotion back to the Thai top flight in 2014.

=== Madam Pang's takeover (2015–2023) ===
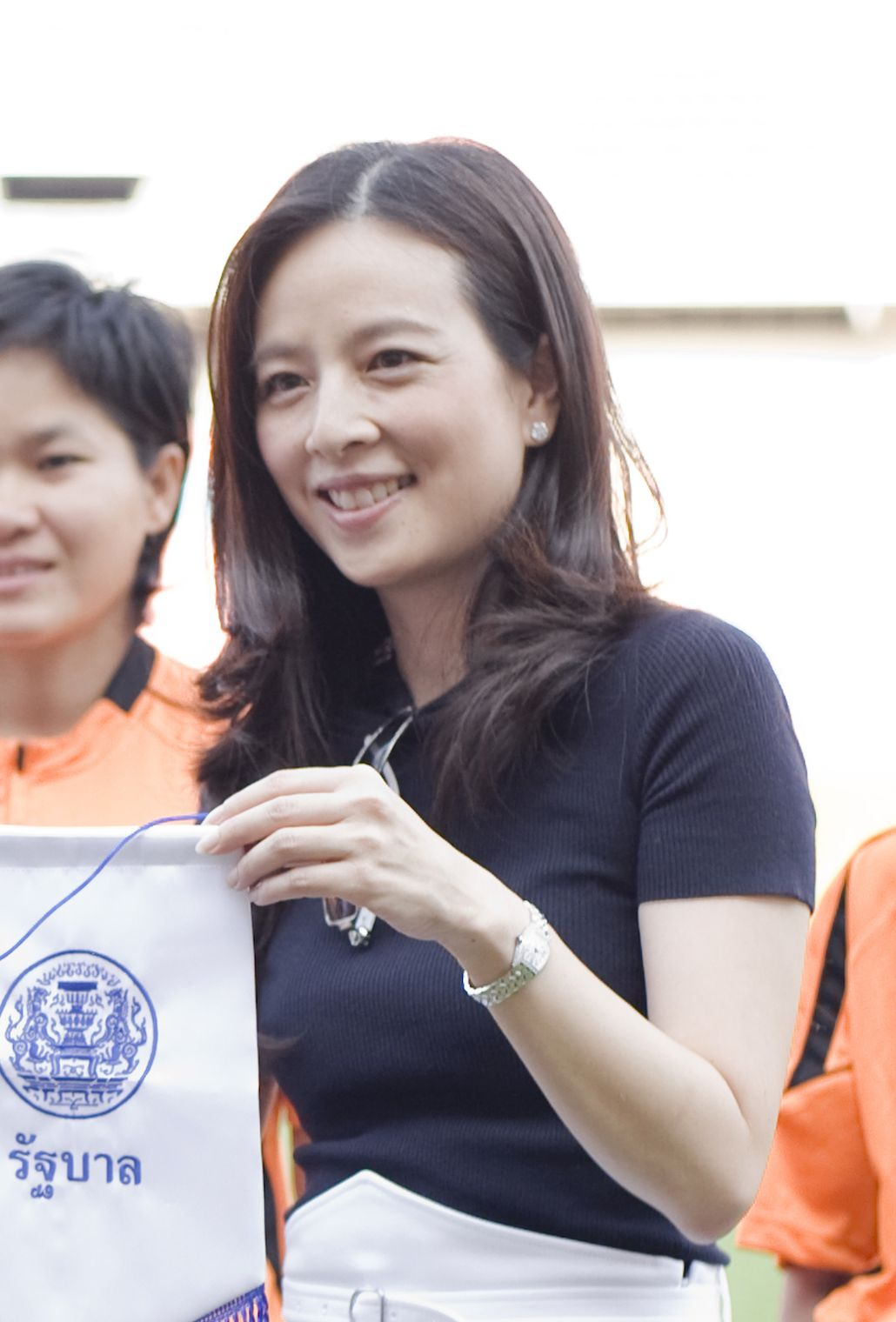
Nualphan Lamsam, chairperson of Port from 2015 to 2023

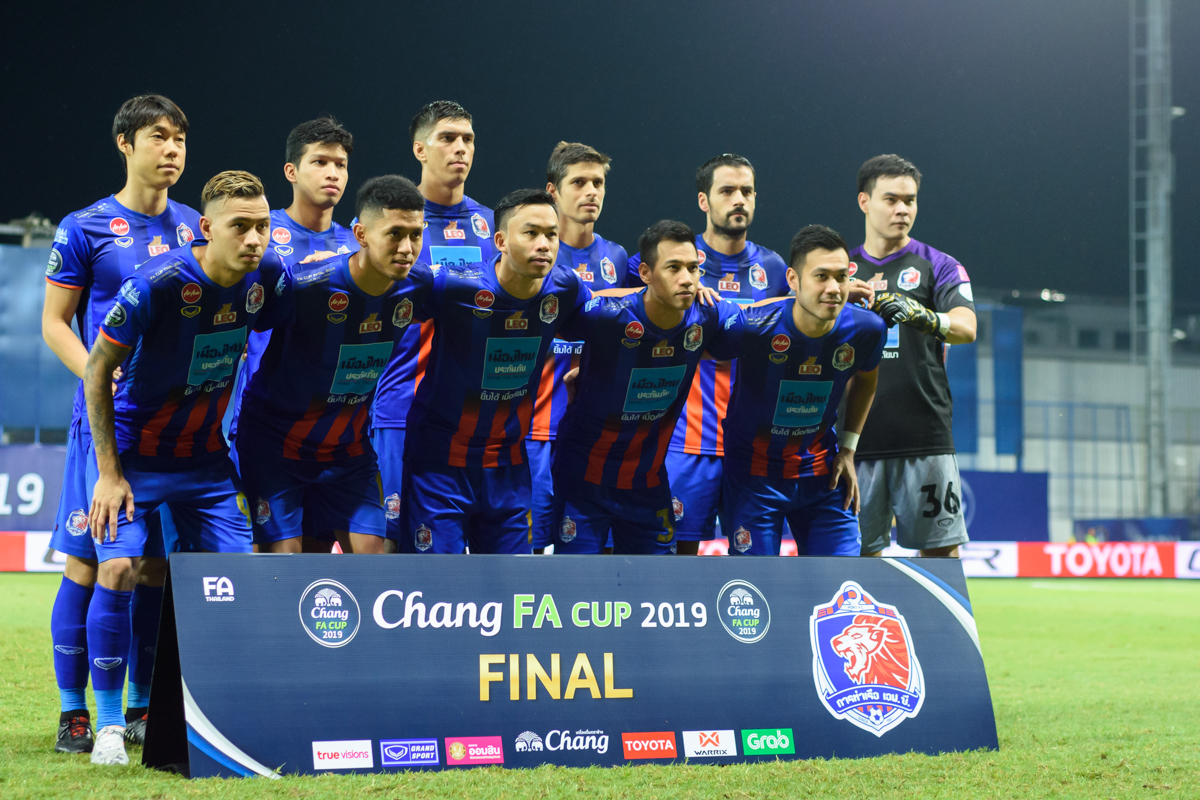
Port before the Thai FA Cup final 2019

In 2015, Singhtarua was taken over by Nualphan Lamsam, Thai businesswoman, by signing the Memorandum of Understanding of a five-year contract with Port Authority of Thailand to control the club's management, and the club name was reverted back to Port Football Club. Nualphan, commonly known to locals as 'Madam Pang', is the majority shareholder of Muang Thai Life Insurance and the assistant secretary general of the Democratic Party, which has held power over Bangkok for over a decade. Since Port Co took over the management of the club in 2015 by Nualphan, the team's results have improved.

In 2017, Port returned to Thai League 1. Nualphan Lamsam announced the appointment of Kiatisuk Senamuang as the new head coach of the club; Kiatisuk was manager of the Thailand national team from 2014 to 2017. Kiatisuk resigned as coach of Port after just three months in charge, managing one win, six losses and three draws during his time with the club.

In 2018, ‘Madam Pang’ loosened the purse-strings significantly in the transfer window, making a clear statement to the rest of the division. There were arrivals such as winger Nurul Sriyankem from Chonburi, left-back Kevin Deeromram from Ratchaburi Mitr Phol, and most significantly, forward Dragan Bošković from Bangkok United. The club finished third in the 2018 Thai League 1 season and created history by claiming 61 points, their highest points in a single season, under manager Jadet Meelarp.

2019 Thai FA Cup Final starting lineup Port 1–0 Ratchaburi

Expected to be one of the contenders for the 2019 Thai League 1 title, Port looked to be on course for a successful campaign until June, when a poor run of form led to the sacking of Jadet Meelarp. The club subsequently appointed national team assistant Choketawee Promrut as head coach and former Manchester City defender Spencer Prior as technical director, sparking a reversal of the team's form as they won five of their next six games. They also qualified for the 2019 Thai FA Cup Final for the first time in a decade.

==== Thai FA Cup winners ====
Port won the 2019 Thai FA Cup after defeating Ratchaburi Mitr Phol 1–0 in the final held at the Leo Stadium. Midfielder Sergio Suarez scored the only goal of the game in the third minute of the second half to give Port their second Thai FA Cup title in front of FIFA president Gianni Infantino. All eyes were on the Video Assistant Referee (VAR) technology which was employed by the Football Association of Thailand for the cup final.

==== AFC Champions League debut ====
In 2021, Port qualified to the 2021 AFC Champions League group stage after finishing the 2020–21 Thai League 1 as runners-up. Port was drawn in Group J alongside Japanese club Cerezo Osaka, Hong Kong club Kitchee and Chinese club Guangzhou. Port got their first win in the AFC Champions League on 27 June 2021, where they defeated Guangzhou 3–0. Port finished the group stage in third place with 8 points but were knocked out from the tournament. During the first round of the 2021–22 Thai FA Cup on 27 October 2021, Port recorded their highest win in an official match. They went on to thrash fourth division club MBF Amphawa 22–1; Nantawat Suankaew, Nurul Sriyankem and Tanasith Siripala scored a poker in the match.

Port won against EFL Championship side Oxford United 2–1 in the 2025 Piala Presiden final

=== Under new chairman (2023–present) ===
On 25 December 2023, chairwoman Nualphan Lamsam left her position to participate as a candidate to run for the presidency of the Football Association of Thailand, which she subsequently won in February 2024. Port was then under a new chairman, Chalermchoke Lamsam who is a relative of Madam Pang under the same Lamsam family name.

On 20 June 2024, AFC confirmed that Port would participate in the inaugural 2024–25 AFC Champions League Two group stage, where the club was drawn in Group F alongside Chinese club Zhejiang, Singaporean club Lion City Sailors and Indonesian club Persib Bandung. Port finished the group, sharing 10 points with Lion City Sailors, but finished as runners-up due to goal difference. Port faced Korean club Jeonbuk Hyundai Motors in the round of 16 but suffered a 5–0 aggregate defeat, thus going out from the competition.

==== Trophy success ====
In July 2025, Port was invited by Football Association of Indonesia to the 2025 Piala Presiden held in Bandung. Port won 2–0 against Persib Bandung on 6 July and also won 2–1 against Dewa United, where Irfan Fandi notably scored a 90+5' stoppage time diving header to win the match for Port on 10 July, thus finishing as group leaders and advancing to the final, where Port face against EFL Championship club Oxford United on 13 July. As Port was 1–0 down, Teerasak Poeiphimai scored an equaliser right before half-time, in the 48' minute. The club's new signing Brayan Perea scored the winner for Port, thus helping the club win the 2025 Piala Presiden cup. Port ended their season by winning the 2025–26 Thai League Cup after Lucas Tocantins scored the only goal in the final against BG Pathum United, where Port finished as runners-up in the 2025–26 Thai League 1 season, qualifying to the 2026–27 AFC Champions League Elite campaign.

== Team image ==
=== Supporters ===
Season	Attendance	Total attendance
2014	3,517	66,834
2015	4,044	68,763
2016	3,043	42,609
2017	4,210	67,361
2018	3,987	67,790
2019	5,087	76,312
As of 8 November 2019

Supporters of Thai Port are often referred to as the Khlong Toei Army. The name refers to Khlong Toei District, the location of the club. "Nakrob Sad Nam-ngurn" refers to "Orange-red Blue Warrior", the Thai Port's shirt colours.

The supporters of Thai Port are often closely associated with those of Chonburi. Many supporters of Thai Port went to the FA Cup final in 2010 wearing Thai Port colors to cheer for Chonburi against Muangthong United. Likewise plenty of kitted-out Chonburi fans came to support Thai Port in their 2010 League Cup Final against Buriram PEA.

The club also attracts a large number of "Farang" (foreign) supporters, probably the largest foreign matchday following of any club in Thailand. Foreign fans are attracted due to the club's central location and proximity to the MRT rail network.

== Academy development ==
In 2015, Port opened its first youth academies, under a collaboration agreement with Patumkongka school. U-14, U-16 and U-18 teams play in Thailand Youth League. Port under-14 team won the 2019 U-14 Paris Saint-Germain Cup.

== Stadium ==
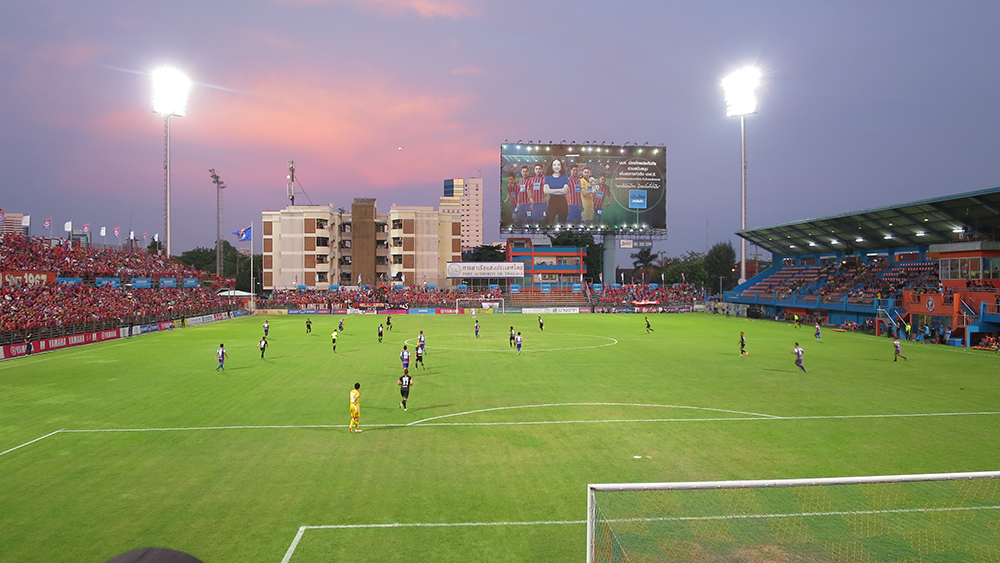
PAT Stadium

Port moved into the PAT Stadium in Khlong Toei district, Bangkok in 2009, which proved to be a very popular move with local supporters. Attendances rose sharply over the year and the club decided to build two new stands to increase the capacity from 6,000 to 7,000. Match tickets cost 100–120 baht and are bought from a small ticket office next to the stadium.

The club has a souvenir shop in the stadium grounds. The shop stocks replica shirts, scarves and other merchandise.

=== Stadium and locations by season records ===
Coordinates	Location	Stadium	Capacity	Year
13°57′04″N 100°37′28″E	Pathum Thani	Thupatemee Stadium	25,000	2007
13°46′00″N 100°33′10″E	Bangkok	Thai-Japanese Stadium	6,600	2008
13°42′54″N 100°33′35″E	Bangkok	PAT Stadium	12,000	2009–present

== Kit suppliers and shirt sponsors ==
List of Port jerseys since their interceptions.

Year	Kit manufacturer	Main sponsors
1990–1996	(Thailand) Grand Sport	(Japan) Mitsubishi Motors
1997–1998	(Thailand) Grand Sport	No sponsors
2003–2004	(Thailand) Grand Sport	(Thailand) Carabao
2004–2008	(Thailand) Grand Sport	Port Authority of Thailand
2009–2010	(Germany) Adidas	(Thailand) FB Battery
2011	In house production	(Thailand) FB Battery
2012	(Thailand) FBT	(Thailand) FB Battery
2013	(Thailand) Grand Sport	Port Authority of Thailand
2014	(Japan) Mizuno	Port Authority of Thailand
2015	(Spain) Joma	(Thailand) Carabao
2016–2021	(Thailand) Grand Sport	(Thailand) Muang Thai Insurance
2021–2023	(Thailand) Ari	(Thailand) Muang Thai Insurance
2023–2025	(Thailand) Grand Sport	(Thailand) Muang Thai Insurance
2025–present	(Japan) Mizuno	(Thailand) Muang Thai Insurance

== Affiliated clubs ==
- (Japan) Avispa Fukuoka (2023–2027)

Port has reaffirmed their strong relationship with J1 League club, Avispa Fukuoka from Japan, by officially signing a two-year extension of their partnership. The collaboration will continue to cover both first and youth teams, as it has in the past.⁣ This renewed memorandum of understanding (MOU) will run through 2027, aiming to elevate both clubs through initiatives such as organizing friendly matches for both first and youth teams, exchanging knowledge among coaching staff, improving both on-field and off-field operations, and most importantly, sending senior and youth players to train at the Japanese club training ground. Port players Sittha Boonlha and Chalermsak Aukkee were sent on a training stint with Avispa Fukuoka in July 2024.⁣

== Players ==
=== Current squad ===
Note: Flags indicate national team as defined under FIFA eligibility rules; some limited exceptions apply. Players may hold more than one non-FIFA nationality.

No.	Pos.	Nation	Player
1	GK	THA	Somporn Yos
3	DF	IDN	Asnawi Mangkualam
4	DF	THA	Suphanan Bureerat
5	MF	THA	Peeradol Chamrasamee
7	FW	OMA	Issam Al-Sabhi
8	MF	THA	Tanaboon Kesarat (Captain)
10	MF	THA	Bordin Phala
11	MF	BRA	Bruno
12	MF	BRA	Kaká Mendes
13	DF	BRA	Matheus Lins
14	FW	THA	Teerasak Poeiphimai
15	DF	THA	Manuel Bihr
16	DF	THA	Chinnawat Wongchai
17	MF	THA	Seksan Ratree (on loan from Buriram United)
18	FW	THA	Jude Soonsup-Bell
19	FW	POR	Rui Pedro Silva Costa

No.	Pos.	Nation	Player
20	DF	BRA	Marcel Scalese
21	MF	THA	Sivakorn Tiatrakul
22	MF	THA	Worachit Kanitsribampen
24	MF	THA	Jakkaphan Kaewprom
25	DF	THA	Chaiyaphon Otton
27	MF	BRA	Lucas Tocantins
28	DF	DEN	Erik Sviatchenko
33	DF	JPN	Noboru Shimura
34	DF	THA	Nitipong Selanon
35	GK	THA	Sarawut Konglarp
36	DF	THA	Peerawat Akkratum
40	GK	THA	Rangsiman Khemmung
47	MF	THA	Sittha Boonlha
77	DF	THA	Hugo Boutsingkham
93	GK	PHI	Michael Falkesgaard

=== Out on loan ===
Note: Flags indicate national team as defined under FIFA eligibility rules; some limited exceptions apply. Players may hold more than one non-FIFA nationality.

No.	Pos.	Nation	Player
2	DF	THA	Pichitchai Sienkrathok (at Ayutthaya United)
6	MF	THA	Chanukun Karin (at Ayutthaya United)

No.	Pos.	Nation	Player
38	MF	THA	Natthakit Phosri (at Hougang United)
—	GK	THA	Sorawat Phosaman (at Pattani)
—	FW	THA	Phutanet Somjit (at Hougang United)

== Management and staff ==
Position	Name
Owner	(Thailand) Chalermchoke Lamsam
Chairman	(Thailand) Photipong Lamsam
Club advisor	(Thailand) Dr. Ongart Korsintha
Head coach	(Montenegro) Božidar Bandović
Assistant coach	(Serbia) Zarko Djalovic (Portugal) Luís Viegas (Thailand) Wichitchai Hatsap (Thailand) Jakarat Tonhongsa
Goalkeeper coach	(Brazil) Beto Guastali
Physical & fitness coach	(Brazil) Vitor Oliveira (Thailand) Krittapol Dangkulau
Conditioning coach & video analyst	(Thailand) Peerapong Cheuaithaisong
Match analyst / Scouting	(Portugal) Luís Viegas
Physiologist	(Serbia) Dejan Tosevski (Thailand) Borworn Raiwichai
Masseur	(Thailand) Warun Petcharat
Interpreter	(Thailand) Jirapat Jarurat
Team coordinator	(Thailand) Waroot Phongkanittanon
Kit man	(Thailand) Prapatpong Sripo (Thailand) Phanthakan Kaeokoed

== Honours ==
Type	Honours	Titles	Seasons
Cup	Thai FA Cup	3	1982, 2009, 2019
Cup	Thai League Cup	2	2010, 2025–26
Cup	Kor Royal Cup	8	1968, 1972, 1974, 1976, 1978, 1979, 1985, 1990
Cup	Queen's Cup	6	1977, 1978, 1979, 1980, 1987, 1993
Others	Bordoloi Trophy	3	1979, 1993, 2007
Others	Indonesia President's Cup	1	2025

Bold is for those competition that are currently active.

== Award winners ==
=== Domestic ===
- Most Valuable Player
  - (Thailand) Pipat Thonkanya (2009)
- League Golden Boot
  - (Thailand) Ronnachai Sayomchai (1998)
  - (Thailand) Pitipong Kuldilok (2001–02)
  - (Thailand) Sarayuth Chaikamdee (2002–03, 2004–05)
- Team of the Season
  - (Thailand) Kevin Deeromram (2024–25)
  - (Thailand) Suphanan Bureerat (2025–26)
  - (Thailand) Peerawat Akkratum (2025–26)
  - (Thailand) Peeradol Chamrasamee (2025–26)
  - (Philippines) Michael Falkesgaard (2025–26)
  - (Brazil) Káka Mendes (2025–26)

== Records and statistics ==
As of 10 October 2026.

Top 10 all-time appearances
Rank	Player	Years	Club appearances
1	(Thailand) Bordin Phala	2018–present	250
2	(Thailand) Pakorn Parmpak	2016–2025	249
3	(Thailand) Kevin Deeromram	2018–2025	180
4	(Thailand) Siwakorn Jakkuprasat	2011–2012, 2015–2023	178
5	(Spain) Sergio Suárez	2017–2023	175
6	(Thailand) Worawut Srisupha	2015–2026	171
7	(Thailand) Nitipong Selanon	2016–2022, 2026–present	169
8	(Thailand) Tanaboon Kesarat	2019–present	160
9	(Thailand) Elias Dolah	2017–2023	158
10	(Spain) David Rochela	2015–2023	142

Top 10 all-time scorers
Rank	Player	Club appearances	Total goals
1	(Spain) Sergio Suárez	175	73
2	(Thailand) Teerasak Poeiphimai	135	52
3	(Thailand) Bordin Phala	250	44
4	(Montenegro) Dragan Bošković	57	35
5	(Thailand) Pakorn Parmpak	249	32
6	(Brazil) Hamilton	48	26
6	(Spain) David Rochela	142	26
8	(Brazil) Josimar	47	22
9	(Thailand) Worachit Kanitsribampen	129	19
10	(Thailand) Nurul Sriyankem	99	17

- Biggest wins: 22–1 vs MBF Amphawa (27 October 2021)
- Heaviest defeats: 2–6 vs Bangkok United (25 February 2017)
- Youngest goal scorers: Natthakit Phosri ~ 17 years 2 months 5 days old (on 13 April 2025 vs Nakhon Pathom United)
- Oldest goal scorers: (Spain) Sergio Suárez ~ 36 years 4 months 06 days old (on 12 May 2023 vs Lamphun Warriors)
- Youngest ever debutant: Natthakit Phosri ~ 17 years 2 months 5 days old (on 13 April 2025 vs Nakhon Pathom United)
- Oldest ever player: Narong Wisetsri ~ 39 years 1 month 22 days old (on 22 November 2015 vs Jumpasri United)

== Former players ==
For details on former players, see Category: Thai Port players.

As of 2026–27 season.

=== International capped players ===
AFC/OFC: (Australia) Brent McGrath; (Indonesia) Asnawi Mangkualam; (Indonesia) Terens Puhiri; (Iraq) Frans Putros; (New Zealand) Kayne Vincent; (Palestine) Matías Jadue; (Philippines) Javier Patiño; (Philippines) Martin Steuble; (Philippines) Michael Falkesgaard; (Philippines) Patrick Reichelt; (Oman) Issam Al-Sabhi; (Singapore) Irfan Fandi; (South Korea) Joo Sung-hwan; (South Korea) Kim Geun-chol; (South Korea) Lee Sang-ho	CAF: (Equatorial Guinea) Thierry Fidjeu; (Ivory Coast) Yannick Boli; (Ghana) Isaac Honny; (Guinea) Lonsana Doumbouya; (Madagascar) Baggio Rakotonomenjanahary; (Nigeria) Ikechukwu Kalu; (Togo) Peniel Mlapa	UEFA: (Denmark) Erik Sviatchenko; (France) Hugo Boutsingkham; (Liechtenstein) Mathias Christen; (Montenegro) Dragan Bošković; (Serbia) Andrija Kaluđerović; (Spain) David Rochela	CONMEBOL/ CONCACAF: (Brazil) Leandro; (Brazil) Negueba; (Brazil) Willen; (Colombia) Brayan Perea; (El Salvador) Nelson Bonilla; (Panama) Rolando Blackburn

== Managerial history ==
Name	Period	Honours
(Thailand) Daoyod Dara	1996–2001	
(Thailand) Niwat Srisawat	2002–2007	
(Thailand) Somchart Yimsiri	2008	
(Thailand) Paiboon Lertvimonrut	2009	
(Thailand) Sasom Pobprasert	2009–2011	2009 Thai FA Cup 2010 Thai League Cup
(Thailand) Thongchai Sukkoki	2011–2012	
(Thailand) Piyakul Kaewnamkang	2012	
(Thailand) Adul Leukijna	2012	
(Thailand) Worakorn Wichanarong	2012	
(Thailand) Dusit Chalermsan	2012–2014	
(Thailand) Somchai Chuayboonchum	2014–2015	
(Thailand) Paiboon Lertvimonrut	2015	
(England) Gary Stevens	2015	
(Thailand) Somchai Subpherm	2015	
(Japan) Masahiro Wada	2015–2016	
(Thailand) Jadet Meelarp	2016–2017	
(Thailand) Kiatisuk Senamuang	2017	
(Thailand) Jadet Meelarp (2)	2017–2019	
(Thailand) Choketawee Promrut	2019–2020	2019 Thai FA Cup
(Thailand) Jadet Meelarp (3)	2020	
(Thailand) Sarawut Treephan	2020–2021	
(Thailand) Dusit Chalermsan (2)	2021	
(Thailand) Sarawut Treephan (2)	2021–2022	
(Thailand) Weerayut Binebdullohman (interim)	2022	
(Thailand) Jadet Meelarp (4)	2022	
(England) Scott Cooper	2022	
(Wales) Matthew Holland (interim)	2022–2023	
(Thailand) Choketawee Promrut (2) (Thailand) Surapong Kongthep	2023	
(Thailand) Rangsan Viwatchaichok	2023–2025	
(Thailand) Choketawee Promrut (interim) (3)	2025	
(Thailand) Wasapol Kaewpaluk	2025	
(Brazil) Alexandre Gama	2025–2026	2025 Indonesia President's Cup
(Thailand) Sarawut Treephan (interim) (3)	2026	2025–26 Thai League Cup
(Montenegro) Božidar Bandović	2026–	

== Season by season record ==
Season	League									FA Cup	League Cup	Queen's Cup	Kor Cup / Champions Cup	ACL	AFC Cup / ACL Two	Top scorer	
Season	Division	P	W	D	L	F	A	Pts	Pos	FA Cup	League Cup	Queen's Cup	Kor Cup / Champions Cup	ACL	AFC Cup / ACL Two	Name	Goals
1996–97	TPL	34	9	14	11	44	39	41	11th	—N/a	–	—N/a	–	–	–	—N/a	—N/a
1997	TPL	22	9	5	8	36	35	32	4th	—N/a	–	—N/a	–	–	–	—N/a	—N/a
1998	TPL	22	10	7	5	50	27	37	4th	—N/a	–	–	–	–	–	(Thailand) Ronnachai Sayomchai	23
1999	TPL	22	12	3	7	31	16	39	2nd	—N/a	–	—N/a	–	–	–	—N/a	—N/a
2000	TPL	22	8	6	8	18	21	30	5th	—N/a	–	—N/a	–	–	–	—N/a	—N/a
2001–02	TPL	22	6	10	6	26	23	28	6th	—N/a	–	–	–	–	–	(Thailand) Pitipong Kuldilok	12
2002–03	TPL	18	10	3	5	25	19	33	3rd	–	–	—N/a	–	–	–	(Thailand) Sarayuth Chaikamdee	10
2003–04	TPL	18	9	1	8	29	28	28	5th	–	–	—N/a	–	–	–	—N/a	—N/a
2004–05	TPL	18	7	5	6	26	27	26	4th	–	–	–	–	–	–	(Thailand) Sarayuth Chaikamdee	10
2006	TPL	22	7	7	8	21	28	28	7th	–	–	GR	–	–	–	(Thailand) Nirut Kamsawad	6
2007	TPL	30	9	9	12	36	43	36	12th	–	–	–	–	–	–	(Thailand) Pitipong Kuldilok	7
2008	TPL	30	7	9	14	30	47	30	13th	–	–	–	–	–	–	(Thailand) Teerawut Sanphan	6
2009	TPL	30	12	8	10	33	30	44	6th	W	–	Not Enter	–	–	–	(Thailand) Pipat Thonkanya	10
2010	TPL	30	13	9	8	41	29	48	4th	R3	W	GR	RU	–	QF	(Thailand) Sarayuth Chaikamdee	13
2011	TPL	34	12	9	13	33	38	45	7th	R3	RU	–	–	–	–	(Thailand) Ekkachai Sumrei	4
2012	TPL	34	8	9	17	32	48	33	16th	R4	R3	–	–	–	–	(Sweden) Olof Hvidén-Watson	10
2013	DIV 1	34	20	5	9	61	40	65	2nd	QF	R1	–	–	–	–	(Brazil) Leandro Oliveira	24
2014	TPL	38	15	9	14	44	52	45	13th	R4	R2	–	–	–	–	(Brazil) Leandro Oliveira	10
2015	TPL	34	10	3	21	31	49	33	17th	R4	R2	–	–	–	–	(Thailand) Wuttichai Tathong	6
2016	DIV 1	26	13	8	5	55	30	47	3rd	QF	SF	–	–	–	–	(Brazil) Rodrigo Maranhão	10
2017	T1	34	14	8	12	60	63	50	9th	R3	R2	–	–	–	–	(Brazil) Josimar	13
2018	T1	34	19	4	11	73	45	61	3rd	QF	R2	–	–	–	–	(Montenegro) Dragan Bošković	21
2019	T1	30	15	8	7	55	36	53	3rd	W	R1	–	–	–	–	(Spain) Sergio Suárez	10
2020–21	T1	30	17	5	8	58	36	56	3rd	R3	–	–	RU	PR2	–	(Spain) Sergio Suárez	14
2021–22	T1	30	11	6	13	41	37	39	8th	R3	R1	–	–	GR	–	(Spain) Sergio Suárez	9
2022–23	T1	30	14	10	6	52	38	52	3rd	SF	R1	–	–	PO	–	(Brazil) Hamilton	15
2023–24	T1	30	16	9	5	72	37	57	3rd	R1	SF	–	–	PO	–	(Thailand) Teerasak Poeiphimai	15
2024–25	T1	30	13	9	8	52	39	48	5th	R1	QF	–	–	–	R16	(Thailand) Teerasak Poeiphimai	10
2025–26	T1	30	18	6	6	59	23	60	2nd	R2	W	–	–	–	–	(Brazil) Kaká Mendes	8

- P = Played
- W = Games won
- D = Games drawn
- L = Games lost
- F = Goals for
- A = Goals against
- Pts = Points
- Pos = Final position
- N/A = No answer
- TPL = Thai Premier League
- DIV1 = Thai Division 1 League
- T1 = Thai League 1
- PR = Preliminary round
- QR1 = First qualifying round
- QR2 = Second qualifying round
- QR3 = Third qualifying round
- QR4 = Fourth qualifying round
- RInt = Intermediate round
- R1 = Round 1
- R2 = Round 2
- R3 = Round 3
- R4 = Round 4
- R5 = Round 5
- R6 = Round 6
- GR = Group stage
- QF = Quarter-finals
- SF = Semi-finals
- RU = Runners-up
- S = Shared
- W = Winners

== Continental record ==
Season	Competition	Round	Club	Home	Away	Aggregate
1986	Asian Club Championship	Qualifying stage	(Malaysia) Selangor	0–1	0–1	0–2
1991	Asian Club Championship	Quarter-finals (Group A)	(Qatar) Al Rayyan	1–3		3rd out of 4
1991	Asian Club Championship	Quarter-finals (Group A)	(Bangladesh) Mohammedan SC	4–1		3rd out of 4
1991	Asian Club Championship	Quarter-finals (Group A)	(United Arab Emirates) Al Shabab	1–3		3rd out of 4
2010	AFC Cup	Group H	(Vietnam) SHB Đà Nẵng	2–3	0–0	2nd out of 4
2010	AFC Cup	Group H	(Hong Kong) Tai Po	2–0	1–0	2nd out of 4
2010	AFC Cup	Group H	(Singapore) Geylang United	2–2	1–0	2nd out of 4
2010	AFC Cup	Round of 16	(Indonesia) Sriwijaya	4–1		
2010	AFC Cup	Quarter-finals	(Kuwait) Al-Qadsia	0–0	0–3	0–3
2020	AFC Champions League	Preliminary round 2	(Philippines) Ceres–Negros	0–1		
2021	AFC Champions League	Group J	(Hong Kong) Kitchee	1–1	0–2	3rd out of 4
2021	AFC Champions League	Group J	(China) Guangzhou	3–0	5–1	3rd out of 4
2021	AFC Champions League	Group J	(Japan) Cerezo Osaka	0–3	1–1	3rd out of 4
2022	AFC Champions League	Play-off round	(South Korea) Ulsan Hyundai	0–3		
2023–24	AFC Champions League	Play-off round	(China) Zhejiang Pro	0–1		
2024–25	AFC Champions League Two	Group F	(China) Zhejiang Pro	1–0	2–1	2nd out of 4
2024–25	AFC Champions League Two	Group F	(Singapore) Lion City Sailors	1–3	2–5	2nd out of 4
2024–25	AFC Champions League Two	Group F	(Indonesia) Persib Bandung	2–2	1–0	2nd out of 4
2024–25	AFC Champions League Two	Round of 16	(South Korea) Jeonbuk Hyundai Motors	0–4	0–1	0–5
2026–27	AFC Champions League Elite	League stage	(Japan) Vissel Kobe	1–2	—N/a	
2026–27	AFC Champions League Elite	League stage	(Japan) Kashiwa Reysol	—N/a	1–5	
2026–27	AFC Champions League Elite	League stage	(Malaysia) Johor Darul Ta'zim	—N/a	0–3	
2026–27	AFC Champions League Elite	League stage	(China) Beijing Guoan	7–4	—N/a	
2026–27	AFC Champions League Elite	League stage	(Japan) Gamba Osaka	—N/a		
2026–27	AFC Champions League Elite	League stage	(Japan) Kashima Antlers		—N/a	
2026–27	AFC Champions League Elite	League stage	(China) Shanghai Port	—N/a		
2026–27	AFC Champions League Elite	League stage	(Japan) Kyoto Sanga		—N/a	
2026–27	ASEAN Club Championship	Group B	(Indonesia) Persib Bandung	1–3	—N/a	
2026–27	ASEAN Club Championship	Group B	(Cambodia) PKR Svay Rieng	—N/a	1–4	
2026–27	ASEAN Club Championship	Group B	(Myanmar) Shan United	—N/a		
2026–27	ASEAN Club Championship	Group B	(Singapore) Lion City Sailors	—N/a		
2026–27	ASEAN Club Championship	Group B	(Malaysia) Johor Darul Ta'zim		—N/a	
2026–27	ASEAN Club Championship	Group B	(Vietnam) Công An Hà Nội		—N/a	
