= 2021–22 Port F.C. season =

Port
2021-22 season
- Chairman: Nualphan Lamsam
- Manager: Sarawut Treephan (until 20 July 2021); Dusit Chalermsan (until 11 November 2021); Sarawut Treephan (from 11 November 2021)
- Stadium: PAT Stadium, Khlong Toei, Bangkok, Thailand
- Thai League T1: 8th
- Thai FA Cup: Third Round
- Thai League Cup: First round
- AFC Champions League: Group Stage
- Top goalscorer: League: Sergio Suárez (9); All: Sergio Suárez (13)
| Home colours | Away colours | Third colours |

The 2021-22 season is Port's 5th consecutive seasons in the top flight after being promoted back from Thai League 2 in 2017. Also, as Port finished 2nd in the first half of 2020-21 Thai League 1, they are qualified to the group stage of the 2021 AFC Champions League. In this season, Port participates in 4 competitions which consisted of the Thai League, FA Cup, League Cup, and AFC Champions League.

The season was supposed to start on 31 July 2021 and conclude on 21 May 2022. Then, due to the situation of the COVID-19 pandemic is still severe, FA Thailand decided to postpone the season to start on 13 August 2021 instead. However, as it stands on 23 July 2021, the COVID-19's situation is getting even worse. Therefore, FA Thailand decided to postpone the opening day for the second time to start on 3 September 2021.

== Squad ==
As of 4 January 2022

| Squad No. | Name | Nationality | Date of birth (age) | Previous club |
Goalkeepers
| 1 | Kawin Thamsatchanan | (Thailand) | 26 January 1990 (age 35) | (Belgium) OH Leuven |
| 18 | Rattanai Songsangchan | (Thailand) | 10 June 1995 (age 30) | (Thailand) Police United F.C. |
| 25 | Chatcharin Phutangdaen | (Thailand) | 2 June 1998 (age 27) | Youth Team |
| 36 | Worawut Srisupha | (Thailand) | 25 May 1992 (age 33) | (Thailand) Bangkok F.C. |
Defenders
| 4 | Elias Dolah | (Thailand) | 24 April 1993 (age 32) | (Thailand) Songkhla United F.C. |
| 15 | Jaturapat Sattham | (Thailand) | 15 June 1999 (age 26) | (Thailand) Chainat Hornbill F.C. |
| 20 | Adisorn Promrak | (Thailand) | 21 October 1993 (age 32) | (Thailand) Muangthong United F.C. |
| 22 | David Rochela (captain) | (Spain) | 19 February 1990 (age 35) | (Thailand) Buriram United F.C. |
| 23 | Kevin Deeromram | (Thailand) | 11 September 1997 (age 28) | (Thailand) Ratchaburi Mitr Phol F.C. |
| 24 | Worawut Namvech | (Thailand) | 4 July 1995 (age 30) | (Thailand) Nongbua Pitchaya F.C. |
| 27 | Anusak Jaiphet | (Thailand) | 23 June 1999 (age 26) | (Thailand) Sukhothai F.C. |
| 30 | Martin Steuble | (Philippines) (Switzerland) | 9 June 1988 (age 37) | (Thailand) Muangkan United F.C. |
| 33 | Philip Roller | (Thailand) | 10 June 1994 (age 31) | (Thailand) Ratchaburi Mitr Phol F.C. |
| 70 | Panomporn Puangmalai | (Thailand) | 12 March 1999 (age 26) | (Thailand) Chamchuri United F.C. |
Midfielders
| 6 | Charyl Chappuis | (Thailand) | 22 January 1992 (age 33) | (Thailand) Muangthong United F.C. |
| 7 | Pakorn Prempak | (Thailand) | 2 February 1993 (age 32) | (Thailand) Police United F.C. |
| 8 | Go Seul-ki | (South Korea) | 21 April 1986 (age 39) | (Thailand) Buriram United F.C. |
| 10 | Bordin Phala | (Thailand) | 20 December 1994 (age 31) | (Thailand) Buriram United F.C. |
| 11 | Tanasith Siripala | (Thailand) | 9 August 1995 (age 30) | (Thailand) Suphanburi F.C. |
| 13 | Nurul Sriyankem | (Thailand) | 8 February 1992 (age 33) | (Thailand) Chonburi F.C. |
| 16 | Siwakorn Jakkuprasat (Vice-captain) | (Thailand) | 23 April 1992 (age 33) | (Thailand) Muangthong United F.C. |
| 17 | Tanaboon Kesarat | (Thailand) | 21 May 1993 (age 32) | (Thailand) BG Pathum United F.C. |
| 31 | Kannarin Thawornsak | (Thailand) | 27 May 1997 (age 28) | (Thailand) Ratchaburi Mitr Phol F.C. |
| 45 | Nattawut Sombatyotha | (Thailand) | 1 May 1996 (age 29) | (Thailand) Ratchaburi Mitr Phol F.C. |
| 47 | Sittha Boonlha | (Thailand) | 2 September 2004 (age 21) | (Thailand) Assumption United F.C. |
| 69 | Sansern Limwattana | (Thailand) | 30 June 1997 (age 28) | (Thailand) Bangkok United F.C. |
| 88 | William Weidersjö | (Thailand) | 10 June 2001 (age 24) | (Sweden) Hammarby TFF |
Forwards
| 5 | Sergio Suárez (3rd captain) | (Spain) | 9 January 1987 (age 39) | (Thailand) Songkhla United F.C. |
| 9 | Nelson Bonilla | (El Salvador) | 11 September 1990 (age 35) | (Thailand) Bangkok United F.C. |
| 12 | Janepob Phokhi | (Thailand) | 4 April 1996 (age 29) | (Thailand) Police Tero F.C. |
| 21 | Teerasak Poeiphimai | (Thailand) | 21 September 2002 (age 23) | (Thailand) Prime Bangkok F.C. |
| 77 | Phuchit Petcharat | (Thailand) | 6 August 2002 (age 23) | (Thailand) Pattana F.C. |
| 95 | Adisak Kraisorn | (Thailand) | 1 February 1991 (age 34) | (Thailand) Muangthong United F.C. |
Players loaned out / left during season
| 26 | Sarawut Kanlayanabandit | (Thailand) | 27 May 1991 (age 34) | (Thailand) Samut Prakan City F.C. |
| 30 | Javier Patiño | (Philippines) | 14 February 1988 (age 37) | (Thailand) Ratchaburi Mitr Phol F.C. |
| 91 | John Baggio | (Madagascar) | 19 December 1991 (age 34) | (Thailand) Sukhothai F.C. |
| 34 | Nitipong Selanon | (Thailand) | 25 May 1993 (age 32) | (Thailand) Buriram United F.C. |
| 35 | Nantawat Suankaew | (Thailand) | 8 December 1998 (age 27) | (Thailand) Samut Prakan City F.C. |
| 29 | Meechok Marhasaranukun | (Thailand) | 12 December 1997 (age 28) | (Thailand) Suphanburi F.C. |
| 2 | Thitawee Aksornsri | (Thailand) | 8 November 1997 (age 28) | (Thailand) Police Tero F.C. |
| 3 | Thitathorn Aksornsri | (Thailand) | 8 November 1997 (age 28) | (Thailand) Police Tero F.C. |
| 1 | Watchara Buathong | (Thailand) | 20 April 1993 (age 32) | (Thailand) Osotspa Samut Prakan |
| 14 | Tawin Mahajindawong | (Thailand) | 9 March 1998 (age 27) | (Belgium) OH Leuven |

== Transfer ==
=== Pre-season transfer ===
==== In ====
| Position | Player | Transferred From | Ref |
|---|---|---|---|
| DF | (Thailand) Philip Roller | (Thailand) Ratchaburi Mitr Phol F.C. | Undisclosed |
| FW | (Philippines) Javier Patiño | Unattached (Note: Most recently played for Ratchaburi Mitr Phol F.C.) | Free |

==== Loan In ====
| Position | Player | Transferred From | Ref |
|---|---|---|---|
| MF | (Madagascar) John Baggio | (Thailand) Sukhothai F.C. | Until the end of 2021 |

==== Out ====
| Position | Player | Transferred To | Ref |
|---|---|---|---|
| MF | (Thailand) Chatmongkol Thongkiri | (Thailand) BG Pathum United F.C. | Undisclosed |
| DF | (Thailand) Todsapol Lated | (Thailand) Chiangmai United F.C. | Undisclosed |
| DF | (Philippines) Martin Steuble | (Thailand) Muangkan United F.C. | Undisclosed |

==== Return from loan ====
| Position | Player | Transferred From | Ref |
|---|---|---|---|
| MF | (Thailand) Chatmongkol Thongkiri | (Thailand) Muangthong United F.C. | Loan return |
| DF | (Thailand) Sarawut Kanlayanabandit | (Thailand) Muangthong United F.C. | Loan return |
| DF | (Thailand) Yossawat Montha | (Thailand) Nongbua Pitchaya F.C. | Loan return |
| MF | (Thailand) Sansern Limwattana | (Thailand) Trat F.C. | Loan return |
| FW | (Thailand) Nantawat Suankaew | (Thailand) Nongbua Pitchaya F.C. | Loan return |
| MF | (Thailand) Chanayut Jejue | (Thailand) Ayutthaya United F.C. | Loan return |

==== Loan Out ====
| Position | Player | Transferred To | Ref |
|---|---|---|---|
| FW | (Ivory Coast) Yannick Boli | (Thailand) Chiangmai United F.C. | Season loan |
| DF | (Thailand) Yossawat Montha | (Thailand) Songkhla F.C. | Season loan |
| MF | (Thailand) Chanayut Jejue | (Thailand) Muang Loei United F.C. | Season loan |
| MF | (Thailand) Partchya Katethip | (Thailand) Muang Loei United F.C. | Season loan |
| FW | (Thailand) Phodchara Chainarong | (Thailand) Muang Loei United F.C. | Season loan |
| DF | (Thailand) Sarawut Kanlayanabandit | (Thailand) Muang Loei United F.C. | Season loan |

=== Mid-season transfer ===
==== In ====
| Position | Player | Transferred From | Ref |
|---|---|---|---|
| DF | (Thailand) Anusak Jaiphet | (Thailand) Sukhothai F.C. | Undisclosed |
| FW | (Thailand) Teerasak Poeiphimai | (Thailand) Prime Bangkok F.C. | Undisclosed |
| DF | (Philippines) Martin Steuble | (Thailand) Muangkan United F.C. | Free |
| MF | (Thailand) Sittha Boonlha | (Thailand) Assumption United | Undisclosed |
| MF | (Thailand) William Weidersjö | (Sweden) Hammarby TFF | Undisclosed |
| FW | (Thailand) Janepob Phokhi | (Thailand) Police Tero | Undisclosed |
| DF | (Thailand) Panomporn Puangmalai | (Thailand) Chamchuri United | Undisclosed |
| FW | (Thailand) Phuchit Petcharat | (Thailand) Pattana | Undisclosed |

==== Loan In ====
| Position | Player | Transferred From | Ref |
|---|---|---|---|
| GK | (Thailand) Kawin Thamsatchanan | (Belgium) OH Leuven | Season loan |
| FW | (Thailand) Adisak Kraisorn | (Thailand) Muangthong United | Season loan |

==== Out ====
| Position | Player | Transferred To | Ref |
|---|---|---|---|
| FW | (Philippines) Javier Patiño | Unattached | Retired |
| DF | (Thailand) Nitipong Selanon | Unattached (Note: Later joined for Chiangrai United F.C.) | Free |
| MF | (Thailand) Tawin Mahajindawong | (Thailand) Customs Ladkrabang United F.C. | Undisclosed |

==== Return from loan ====
| Position | Player | Transferred From | Ref |
|---|---|---|---|
| MF | (Thailand) Chanayut Jejue | (Thailand) Muang Loei United F.C. | Loan return |

==== Loan Out ====
| Position | Player | Transferred To | Ref |
|---|---|---|---|
| FW | (Thailand) Nantawat Suankaew | (Thailand) Customs Ladkrabang United F.C. | Season loan |
| DF | (Thailand) Meechok Marhasaranukun | (Thailand) Customs Ladkrabang United F.C. | Season loan |
| FW | (Thailand) Pattharapol Jeamking | (Thailand) Customs Ladkrabang United F.C. | Season loan |
| MF | (Thailand) Chanayut Jejue | (Thailand) Sisaket F.C. | Season loan |
| DF | (Thailand) Thitawee Aksornsri | (Thailand) PT Prachuap F.C. | Season loan |
| DF | (Thailand) Thitathorn Aksornsri | (Thailand) PT Prachuap F.C. | Season loan |
| GK | (Thailand) Watchara Buathong | (Thailand) Trat F.C. | Season loan |

== Competitions ==
=== Overview ===
| Competition | First match | Last match | Starting round | Final position | Record | | | | | | | |
| Competition | First match | Last match | Starting round | Final position | Pld | W | D | L | GF | GA | GD | Win % |
|---|---|---|---|---|---|---|---|---|---|---|---|---|
| Thai League | 5 September 2021 | 21 May 2022 | Matchday 1 | | 17 | 8 | 5 | 4 | 24 | 16 | +8 | 47.06 |
| FA Cup | 27 October 2021 | | First Round | | 2 | 2 | 0 | 0 | 26 | 3 | +23 | 100.00 |
| League Cup | 12 January 2022 | 12 January 2022 | First Round | First Round | 1 | 0 | 1 | 0 | 0 | 0 | +0 | 0.00 |
| Champions League | 24 June 2021 | 9 July 2021 | Group stage | 3rd | 6 | 2 | 2 | 2 | 10 | 8 | +2 | 33.33 |
| Total | | | | | 26 | 12 | 8 | 6 | 60 | 27 | +33 | 46.15 |

Last updated: 15 January 2022
Source: Competitions

=== Thai League 1 ===
==== League table ====
| Pos | Team | Pld | W | D | L | GF | GA | GD | Pts |
|---|---|---|---|---|---|---|---|---|---|
| 6 | Nongbua Pitchaya | 30 | 13 | 8 | 9 | 42 | 35 | +7 | 47 |
| 7 | Chonburi | 30 | 12 | 8 | 10 | 50 | 40 | +10 | 44 |
| 8 | Port | 30 | 11 | 6 | 13 | 41 | 37 | +4 | 39 |
| 9 | Nakhon Ratchasima | 30 | 10 | 7 | 13 | 33 | 47 | −14 | 37 |
| 10 | Khonkaen United | 30 | 10 | 7 | 13 | 30 | 43 | −13 | 37 |

Updated to match(es) played on 4 May 2022. Source: Thai League
Rules for classification: 1) Points; 2) Head-to-head points; 3) Head-to-head goals difference; 4) Head-to-head goals scored; 5) Overall goals difference; 6) Overall goals scored; 7) Fair play points; 8) Play-off without extra time;).

==== Results summary ====
| Overall | | | | | | | | Home | | | | | | Away | | | | | |
| Pld | W | D | L | GF | GA | GD | Pts | W | D | L | GF | GA | GD | W | D | L | GF | GA | GD |
|---|---|---|---|---|---|---|---|---|---|---|---|---|---|---|---|---|---|---|---|
| 17 | 8 | 5 | 4 | 24 | 16 | +8 | 29 | 5 | 2 | 2 | 12 | 8 | +4 | 3 | 3 | 2 | 12 | 8 | +4 |

==== Results by matchday ====
| Matchday | 1 | 2 | 3 | 4 | 5 | 6 | 7 | 8 | 9 | 10 | 11 | 12 | 13 | 14 | 15 | 16 | 17 | 18 |
|---|---|---|---|---|---|---|---|---|---|---|---|---|---|---|---|---|---|---|
| Ground | H | A | H | A | H | A | H | A | H | H | A | H | A | H | A | H | A | H |
| Result | D | D | W | L | W | W | L | D | W | L | L | W | W | W | W | D | D | |
| Position | 5 | 11 | 4 | 7 | 3 | 2 | 5 | 6 | 5 | 6 | 8 | 7 | 6 | 5 | 4 | 4 | | |

A = Away; H = Home; W = Win; D = Draw; L = Loss

==== Matches ====
Win Draw Loss

| 5 September 2021 1 | Port | 3-3 | Police Tero | Bangkok |
| | Sergio Suárez 23' 55'; Rochela 45' | | Evandro 6' 24'; Honny 33' | Stadium: PAT Stadium |

| 12 September 2021 2 | True Bangkok United | 1-1 | Port | Pathum Thani |
| | Vander 41' | | Bonilla 37' | Stadium: True Stadium; Referee: Torphong Somsing |

| 18 September 2021 3 | Port | 2-0 | Khonkaen United | Bangkok |
| | Pakorn 15'; Bonilla 19' | | | Stadium: PAT Stadium; Attendance: 0 Referee: Chaireag Ngam-som |

| 26 September 2021 4 | Suphanburi | 2-1 | Port | Suphan Buri |
| | Ratchanat 18' (pen.) 50' | | Bonilla 4'; Jaturapat (red card) 15' | Stadium: Suphan Buri Provincial Stadium; Attendance: 0 Referee: Noppadet Mangngam |

| 2 October 2021 5 | Port | 1-0 | Muangthong United | Bangkok |
| | Bonilla 30' | | | Stadium: PAT Stadium; Attendance: 0 Referee: Niwat Insa-ard |

| 7 October 2021 6 | Chiangmai United | 0-2 | Port | Chiang Mai |
| | Mehti (red card) 38' | | Bonilla 65'; Go 72' | Stadium: 700th Anniversary Stadium; Attendance: 1,245; Referee: Kotchapoom Meesridaecha |

| 10 October 2021 7 | Port | 0-2 | Buriram United | Bangkok |
| | Sergio Suárez (red card) 75' | | Supachai Chaided 50'; Supachok Sarachat 56' | Stadium: PAT Stadium; Attendance: 1,234; Referee: Chaireag Ngam-som |

| 16 October 2021 8 | Samut Prakan City | 2-2 | Port | Samut Prakan |
| | Aris 18'; Chayawat 81' | | Bordin 60'; Go 75' | Stadium: Samut Prakarn SAT Stadium; Attendance: 648; Referee: Niwat Insa-ard |

| 24 October 2021 9 | Port | 2-0 | PT Prachuap | Bangkok |
| | Bordin 78'; Patiño 84' | | | Stadium: PAT Stadium; Attendance: 936; Referee: Songkran Bunmeekiart |

| 31 October 2021 10 | Port | 1-2 | Chonburi | Bangkok |
| | Rochela 27' | | Eldstål 48'; Worachit 90+4' | Stadium: PAT Stadium; Attendance: 1,313; Referee: Sarayut Jakngoen |

| 7 November 2021 11 | Nakhon Ratchasima | 3-1 | Port | Nakhon Ratchasima |
| | Karikari 27' 31' (pen.); Villanueva 64' | | Nurul 77' | Stadium: 80th Birthday Stadium; Attendance: 1,840; Referee: Songkran Bunmeekiart |

| 11 November 2021 12 | Port | 1-0 | Ratchaburi Mitr Phol | Bangkok |
| | Bordin 69' | | | Stadium: PAT Stadium; Attendance: 10,888; Referee: Chaireag Ngam-som |

| 14 November 2021 13 | Leo Chiangrai United | 0-4 | Port | Chiang Rai |
| | | | Sergio Suárez 8' 45+1' 65'; Bonilla 63' | Stadium: Leo Chiangrai Stadium; Attendance: 1,020; Referee: Natee Choosuwan |

| 20 November 2021 14 | Port | 1-0 | BG Pathum United | Bangkok |
| | Cardozo 27' (o.g.) | | | Stadium: PAT Stadium; Attendance: 1,207; Referee: Sivakorn Pu-udom |

| 27 November 2021 15 | Nongbua Pitchaya | 0-1 | Port | Nong Bua Lamphu |
| | Airton (red card) 89' | | Sergio Suárez 38' | Stadium: Pitchaya Stadium; Attendance: 1,854; Referee: Wiwat Jumpaoon |

| 9 January 2022 16 | Port | 1-1 | True Bangkok United | Bangkok |
| | Adisak 41' | | Thitiphan 90+1' | Stadium: PAT Stadium; Attendance: 1,053; Referee: Chaireag Ngam-som |

| 15 January 2022 17 | Khon Kaen United | 0-0 | Port | Khon Kaen |
| | | | Rochela (red card) 90+3' | Stadium: Khon Kaen Stadium; Attendance: 3,245; Referee: Wiwat Jumpaoon |

| 23 January 2022 18 | Port | v | Suphanburi | Bangkok |
| | | | | Stadium: PAT Stadium |

=== Thai FA Cup ===
==== Matches ====
Win Draw Loss

| 27 October 2021 First Round | MBF Amphawa (TA) | 1-22 | Port (T1) | Samut Songkhram |
| | Amnad 57' | | Sergio Suárez 1' 40'; Rochela 5' (pen.); Nantawat 13' 23' 35' 49' 58'; Bordin 15' 21'; Pakorn 28'; Tanaboon 31'; Nurul 45' 46' 55' 86'; Tanasith 60' 67' 71' 81'; Meechok 63'; Thitawee 84' | Stadium: Samut Songkhram Stadium; Attendance: 0 Referee: Anusorn Nookaew |

| 24 November 2021 Second Round | Kanchanaburi (T3) | 2-4 | Port (T1) | Kanchanaburi |
| | Lucas 24' 85' (pen.) | | Sergio Suárez 14' 17'; Bonilla 34'; Adisorn 56' | Stadium: Kanchanaburi Municipality Stadium |

| 19 January 2022 Third Round | BG Pathum United (T1) | v | Port (T1) | Pathum Thani |
| | | | | Stadium: Leo Stadium |

=== Thai League Cup ===
==== Matches ====
Win Draw Loss

| 12 January 2022 First Round | Muang Loei United (T3) | 0-0 (a.e.t.) (6-5 p) | Port (T1) | Loei |
| | | | | Stadium: Blue Dragon Muang Loei Stadium; Attendance: 0 Referee: Vitsavet Sangnakorn |
| | Penalties |
| | Tanapat (penalty scored); Aphiwat (penalty scored); Weerawat (penalty missed); Amporn (penalty scored); Tana (penalty scored); Anatcha (penalty scored); Rachata (penalty scored) | | (penalty missed) Chappuis; (penalty scored) Kanarin; (penalty scored) Jaturapat; (penalty scored) Roller; (penalty scored) Pakorn; (penalty scored) Janepob; (penalty missed) Siwakorn |

=== AFC Champions League ===
==== Group table ====
| Pos | Team | Pld | W | D | L | GF | GA | GD | Pts | Qualification | CER | KIT | POR | GZH |
|---|---|---|---|---|---|---|---|---|---|---|---|---|---|---|
| 1 | (Japan) Cerezo Osaka | 6 | 4 | 2 | 0 | 13 | 2 | +11 | 14 | Advance to Round of 16 | — | 2–1 | 1–1 | 5–0 |
| 2 | (Hong Kong) Kitchee | 6 | 3 | 2 | 1 | 6 | 3 | +3 | 11 | | 0–0 | — | 2–0 | 1–0 |
| 3 | (Thailand) Port (H) | 6 | 2 | 2 | 2 | 10 | 8 | +2 | 8 | | 0–3 | 1–1 | — | 3–0 |
| 4 | (China) Guangzhou | 6 | 0 | 0 | 6 | 1 | 17 | −16 | 0 | | 0–2 | 0–1 | 1–5 | — |

Source: AFC
Rules for classification: Tiebreakers
(H) Hosts

==== Matches ====
| 24 June 2021 1 | Kitchee (Hong Kong) | 2-0 | (Thailand) Port | Buriram Stadium, Buriram |
| 17:00 UTC+7 | Roberto Orlando Affonso Júnior 37'; Dejan Damjanović 79'; Park Jun-heong (yellow card) 28'; Huang Yang (yellow card) 46'; Cleiton (yellow card) 71' | Report | Siwakorn Jakkuprasat (yellow card) 3'; John Baggio (yellow card) 11' | Referee: Kim Dae-yong (South Korea) |

| 27 June 2021 2 | Port (Thailand) | 3-0 | (China) Guangzhou | Buriram Stadium, Buriram |
| 17:00 UTC+7 | Dolah 21'; Pakorn 60'; Roller 76' | Report | | Referee: Bijan Heidari (Iran) |

| 30 June 2021 3 | Cerezo Osaka (Japan) | 1-1 | (Thailand) Port | Buriram Stadium, Buriram |
| 17:00 UTC+7 | Sakamoto 79' | Report | Pakorn 45+3' | Referee: Ko Hyung-jin (South Korea) |

| 3 July 2021 4 | Port (Thailand) | 0-3 | (Japan) Cerezo Osaka | Buriram Stadium, Buriram |
| 17:00 UTC+7 | | Report | Maruhashi 12'; Ōkubo 45'; Sakamoto 47' | Referee: Nawaf Shukralla (Bahrain) |

| 6 July 2021 5 | Port (Thailand) | 1-1 | (Hong Kong) Kitchee | Buriram Stadium, Buriram |
| 21:00 UTC+7 | Pakorn 13' | Report | Orr 18' | Referee: Ko Hyung-jin (South Korea) |

| 9 July 2021 6 | Guangzhou (China) | 1-5 | (Thailand) Port | Buriram Stadium, Buriram |
| 21:00 UTC+7 | Thitawee 49' (o.g.) | Report | Suárez 5'; Bordin 53'; Rochela 56' (pen.); Wang Wenxuan 76' (o.g.); Chappuis 90+3' | Referee: Kim Dae-yong (South Korea) |

== Team statistics ==
=== Appearances and goals ===
As of 15 January 2022

| No. | Pos. | Player | League | | FA Cup | | League Cup | | AFC Champions League | | Total | |
| No. | Pos. | Player | Apps. | Goals | Apps. | Goals | Apps. | Goals | Apps. | Goals | Apps. | Goals |
|---|---|---|---|---|---|---|---|---|---|---|---|---|
| 1 | GK | (Thailand) Kawin Thamsatchanan | 0 | 0 | 0 | 0 | 0 | 0 | 0 | 0 | 0 | 0 |
| 4 | DF | (Thailand) Elias Dolah | 11+2 | 0 | 0 | 0 | 0 | 0 | 5 | 1 | 16+2 | 1 |
| 5 | FW | (Spain) Sergio Suárez | 14 | 6 | 2 | 4 | 0 | 0 | 6 | 1 | 22 | 11 |
| 6 | MF | (Thailand) Charyl Chappuis | 3+4 | 0 | 0+1 | 0 | 1 | 0 | 1+3 | 1 | 5+8 | 1 |
| 7 | MF | (Thailand) Pakorn Prempak | 16 | 1 | 1 | 1 | 0+1 | 0 | 3+2 | 3 | 20+3 | 5 |
| 8 | MF | (South Korea) Go Seul-ki | 13 | 2 | 0 | 0 | 1 | 0 | 5+1 | 0 | 19+1 | 2 |
| 9 | FW | (El Salvador) Nelson Bonilla | 13+1 | 6 | 1 | 1 | 1 | 0 | 0 | 0 | 15+1 | 7 |
| 10 | MF | (Thailand) Bordin Phala | 17 | 3 | 1 | 2 | 0 | 0 | 4+2 | 1 | 22+2 | 6 |
| 11 | MF | (Thailand) Tanasith Siripala | 0+5 | 0 | 1+1 | 4 | 1 | 0 | 0+2 | 0 | 2+8 | 4 |
| 12 | FW | (Thailand) Janepob Phokhi | 0+1 | 0 | 0 | 0 | 0+1 | 0 | 0 | 0 | 0+2 | 0 |
| 13 | MF | (Thailand) Nurul Sriyankem | 0+9 | 1 | 0+1 | 4 | 1 | 0 | 1+4 | 0 | 2+14 | 5 |
| 15 | DF | (Thailand) Jaturapat Sattham | 6+1 | 0 | 1 | 0 | 1 | 0 | 1 | 0 | 9+1 | 0 |
| 16 | MF | (Thailand) Siwakorn Jakkuprasat | 15 | 0 | 2 | 0 | 1 | 0 | 5+1 | 0 | 23+1 | 0 |
| 17 | MF | (Thailand) Tanaboon Kesarat | 6 | 0 | 1 | 1 | 1 | 0 | 0 | 0 | 8 | 1 |
| 18 | GK | (Thailand) Rattanai Songsangchan | 0 | 0 | 0 | 0 | 1 | 0 | 1 | 0 | 2 | 0 |
| 20 | DF | (Thailand) Adisorn Promrak | 2+2 | 0 | 1 | 1 | 1 | 0 | 0 | 0 | 4+2 | 1 |
| 21 | FW | (Thailand) Teerasak Poeiphimai | 0+1 | 0 | 0 | 0 | 0+1 | 0 | 0 | 0 | 0+2 | 0 |
| 22 | DF | (Spain) David Rochela | 16 | 2 | 2 | 1 | 0 | 0 | 6 | 1 | 24 | 4 |
| 23 | DF | (Thailand) Kevin Deeromram | 6 | 0 | 0 | 0 | 0 | 0 | 0 | 0 | 6 | 0 |
| 24 | DF | (Thailand) Worawut Namvech | 4+9 | 0 | 0+1 | 0 | 0+1 | 0 | 0 | 0 | 4+11 | 0 |
| 27 | DF | (Thailand) Anusak Jaiphet | 0+1 | 0 | 0 | 0 | 0+1 | 0 | 0 | 0 | 0+2 | 0 |
| 30 | DF | (Philippines) Martin Steuble | 0 | 0 | 0 | 0 | 0 | 0 | 0 | 0 | 0 | 0 |
| 31 | MF | (Thailand) Kannarin Thawornsak | 0+2 | 0 | 0 | 0 | 0+1 | 0 | 2+2 | 0 | 2+5 | 0 |
| 33 | DF | (Thailand) Philip Roller | 16 | 0 | 1 | 0 | 1 | 0 | 3+3 | 1 | 21+3 | 1 |
| 36 | GK | (Thailand) Worawut Srisupha | 17 | 0 | 0 | 0 | 0 | 0 | 3 | 0 | 20 | 0 |
| 45 | MF | (Thailand) Nattawut Sombatyotha | 0+9 | 0 | 1+1 | 0 | 0 | 0 | 2+4 | 0 | 3+14 | 0 |
| 47 | MF | (Thailand) Sittha Boonlha | 0 | 0 | 0 | 0 | 0 | 0 | 0 | 0 | 0 | 0 |
| 69 | MF | (Thailand) Sansern Limwattana | 3+4 | 0 | 0 | 0 | 0 | 0 | 0 | 0 | 3+4 | 0 |
| 70 | DF | (Thailand) Panomporn Puangmalai | 0 | 0 | 0 | 0 | 0 | 0 | 0 | 0 | 0 | 0 |
| 77 | FW | (Thailand) Phuchit Petcharat | 0 | 0 | 0 | 0 | 0 | 0 | 0 | 0 | 0 | 0 |
| 88 | MF | (Thailand) William Weidersjö | 0 | 0 | 0 | 0 | 0 | 0 | 0 | 0 | 0 | 0 |
| 95 | FW | (Thailand) Adisak Kraisorn | 2 | 1 | 0 | 0 | 0 | 0 | 0 | 0 | 2 | 1 |
Players loaned out / left during season
| 26 | DF | (Thailand) Sarawut Kanlayanabandit | 0 | 0 | 0 | 0 | 0 | 0 | 0+1 | 0 | 0+1 | 0 |
| 30 | FW | (Philippines) Javier Patiño | 3+3 | 1 | 0 | 0 | 0 | 0 | 0 | 0 | 3+3 | 1 |
| 91 | MF | (Madagascar) John Baggio | 0 | 0 | 0 | 0 | 0 | 0 | 6 | 0 | 6 | 0 |
| 34 | DF | (Thailand) Nitipong Selanon | 3+1 | 0 | 2 | 0 | 0 | 0 | 4 | 0 | 9+1 | 0 |
| 35 | FW | (Thailand) Nantawat Suankaew | 0+1 | 0 | 1+1 | 5 | 0 | 0 | 0 | 0 | 1+2 | 5 |
| 29 | DF | (Thailand) Meechok Marhasaranukun | 0 | 0 | 0+1 | 1 | 0 | 0 | 0 | 0 | 0+1 | 1 |
| 2 | DF | (Thailand) Thitawee Aksornsri | 0+1 | 0 | 0+2 | 1 | 0 | 0 | 1+1 | 0 | 1+4 | 1 |
| 3 | DF | (Thailand) Thitathorn Aksornsri | 1+2 | 0 | 1 | 0 | 0 | 0 | 5 | 0 | 7+2 | 0 |
| 1 | GK | (Thailand) Watchara Buathong | 0 | 0 | 2 | 0 | 0 | 0 | 2+1 | 0 | 4+1 | 0 |
| 14 | MF | (Thailand) Tawin Mahajindawong | 0 | 0 | 1+1 | 0 | 0 | 0 | 0 | 0 | 1+1 | 0 |

== Overall summary ==
=== Season summary ===
| Games played | 26 (17 Thai League, 2 FA Cup, 1 League Cup, 6 AFC Champions League) |
| Games won | 12 (8 Thai League, 2 FA Cup, 0 League Cup, 2 AFC Champions League) |
| Games drawn | 8 (5 Thai League, 0 FA Cup, 1 League Cup, 2 AFC Champions League) |
| Games lost | 6 (4 Thai League, 0 FA Cup, 0 League Cup, 2 AFC Champions League) |
| Goals scored | 60 (24 Thai League, 26 FA Cup, 0 League Cup, 10 AFC Champions League) |
| Goals conceded | 27 (16 Thai League, 3 FA Cup, 0 League Cup, 8 AFC Champions League) |
| Goal difference | +33 |
| Clean sheets | 11 (9 Thai League, 0 FA Cup, 1 League Cup, 1 AFC Champions League) |
| Best result | 22-1 vs MBF Amphawa (27 October 21) |
| Worst result | 0-3 vs Cerezo Osaka (3 July 21) |
| Most appearances | 4 players (24) |
| Top scorer | Sergio Suárez (11) |
| Points | 29 |

=== Score overview ===
| Opposition | Home score | Away score | Double |
|---|---|---|---|
| BG Pathum United | 1-0 | | |
| Buriram United | 0-2 | | No |
| Chiangmai United | | 0-2 | |
| Chonburi | 1-2 | | No |
| Khon Kaen United | 2-0 | 0-0 | No |
| Leo Chiangrai United | | 0-4 | |
| Muangthong United | 1-0 | | |
| Nakhon Ratchasima | | 3-1 | No |
| Nongbua Pitchaya | | 0-1 | |
| Police Tero | 3-3 | | No |
| PT Prachuap | 2-0 | | |
| Ratchaburi Mitr Phol | 1-0 | | |
| Samut Prakan City | | 2-2 | No |
| Suphanburi | | 2-1 | No |
| True Bangkok United | 1-1 | 1-1 | No |
