= 2020–21 Port F.C. season =

Port
2020–21 season
- Chairman: Nualphan Lamsam
- Manager: Choketawee Promrut (until 28 March 2020); Jadet Meelarp (until 21 September 2020); Sarawut Treephan (from 21 September 2020)
- Stadium: PAT Stadium, Khlong Toei, Bangkok, Thailand
- Thai League T1: 3rd
- Thai FA Cup: Round of 16
- AFC Champions League: Preliminary round 2
- Top goalscorer: League: Sergio Suárez (15); All: Sergio Suárez (16)
Home colours	Away colours	Third colours

The 2020–21 season is Port's 4th consecutive seasons in top flight after promoted back from Thai League 2 in 2017. Also, as Port won the 2019 Thai FA Cup, they are qualified to the preliminary round 2 of 2020 AFC Champions League. In this season, Port participates in 4 competitions which consisted of the Champions Cup, Thai League, FA Cup, and AFC Champions League.

On March 1, all Thai League 1 matches between 7 and 31 march will be played behind closed doors as broadcast-only events. However, on March 4, the decision changed to postpone all of matches prior to 18 April due to the coronavirus pandemic in Thailand.

It was later confirmed that the match will be restarted in September 2020 and end in May 2021.

== Squad ==
As of 30 March 2021.

Squad No.	Name	Nationality	Date of birth (age)	Previous club
Goalkeepers
1	Watchara Buathong	(Thailand)	20 April 1993 (age 33)	(Thailand) Osotspa Samut Prakan
18	Rattanai Songsangchan	(Thailand)	10 June 1995 (age 31)	(Thailand) Police United F.C.
25	Chatcharin Phutangdaen	(Thailand)	2 June 1999 (age 27)	Youth Team
36	Worawut Srisupha	(Thailand)	25 May 1992 (age 34)	(Thailand) Bangkok F.C.
Defenders
2	Thitawee Aksornsri	(Thailand)	8 November 1997 (age 28)	(Thailand) Police Tero F.C.
3	Thitathorn Aksornsri	(Thailand)	8 November 1997 (age 28)	(Thailand) Police Tero F.C.
4	Elias Dolah	(Thailand)	24 April 1993 (age 33)	(Thailand) Songkhla United F.C.
6	Todsapol Lated (Vice-captain)	(Thailand)	7 May 1989 (age 37)	(Thailand) Muangthong United F.C.
15	Martin Steuble	(Philippines)	9 June 1988 (age 38)	(Philippines) Ceres-Negros
20	Adisorn Promrak	(Thailand)	21 October 1993 (age 33)	(Thailand) Muangthong United F.C.
21	Jaturapat Sattham	(Thailand)	15 June 1999 (age 27)	(Thailand) Chainat Hornbill F.C.
22	David Rochela (3rd captain)	(Spain)	19 February 1990 (age 36)	(Thailand) Buriram United F.C.
23	Kevin Deeromram	(Thailand)	11 September 1997 (age 29)	(Thailand) Ratchaburi Mitr Phol F.C.
24	Worawut Namvech	(Thailand)	4 July 1995 (age 31)	(Thailand) Nongbua Pitchaya F.C.
34	Nitipong Selanon	(Thailand)	25 May 1993 (age 33)	(Thailand) Buriram United F.C.
-	Meechok Marhasaranukun	(Thailand)	12 December 1997 (age 28)	(Thailand) Suphanburi F.C.
Midfielders
7	Pakorn Prempak	(Thailand)	2 February 1993 (age 33)	(Thailand) Police United F.C.
8	Go Seul-ki	(South Korea)	21 April 1986 (age 40)	(Thailand) Buriram United F.C.
10	Bordin Phala	(Thailand)	20 December 1994 (age 31)	(Thailand) Buriram United F.C.
11	Tanasith Siripala	(Thailand)	9 August 1995 (age 31)	(Thailand) Suphanburi F.C.
13	Nurul Sriyankem	(Thailand)	8 February 1992 (age 34)	(Thailand) Chonburi F.C.
14	Tawin Mahajindawong	(Thailand)	9 March 1998 (age 28)	(Belgium) OH Leuven
16	Siwakorn Jakkuprasat (captain)	(Thailand)	23 April 1992 (age 34)	(Thailand) Muangthong United F.C.
17	Charyl Chappuis	(Thailand)	22 January 1992 (age 34)	(Thailand) Muangthong United F.C.
31	Kannarin Thawornsak	(Thailand)	27 May 1997 (age 29)	(Thailand) Ratchaburi Mitr Phol F.C.
45	Nattawut Sombatyotha	(Thailand)	1 May 1996 (age 30)	(Thailand) Ratchaburi Mitr Phol F.C.
71	Tanaboon Kesarat	(Thailand)	21 May 1993 (age 33)	(Thailand) BG Pathum United F.C.
Forwards
5	Sergio Suárez	(Spain)	9 January 1987 (age 39)	(Thailand) Songkhla United F.C.
9	Adisak Kraisorn	(Thailand)	1 February 1991 (age 35)	(Thailand) Muangthong United F.C.
70	Phodchara Chainarong	(Thailand)	1 January 2001 (age 25)	Youth Team
94	Yannick Boli	(Ivory Coast)	13 January 1988 (age 38)	(Thailand) Ratchaburi Mitr Phol F.C.
99	Nelson Bonilla	(El Salvador)	11 September 1990 (age 36)	(Thailand) Bangkok United F.C.

== Transfer ==
=== Pre-season transfer ===
==== In ====
Position	Player	Transferred From	Ref
MF	(Thailand) Kannarin Thawornsak	(Thailand) Ratchaburi Mitr Phol F.C.	Free
FW	(Thailand) Nattawut Sombatyotha	(Thailand) Ratchaburi Mitr Phol F.C.	THB7.3m
MF	(Thailand) Tanasith Siripala	(Thailand) Suphanburi F.C.	Undisclosed
MF	(South Korea) Go Seul-ki	(Thailand) Buriram United F.C.	Undisclosed
MF	(Thailand) Charyl Chappuis	(Thailand) Muangthong United F.C.	Free
DF	(Thailand) Jaturapat Sattham	(Thailand) Chainat Hornbill F.C.	THB14.6m
MF	(Thailand) Tawin Mahajindawong	(Belgium) OH Leuven	Free
FW	(Thailand) Tanakorn Dangthong	(Thailand) Army United	Undisclosed

==== Loan In ====
Position	Player	Transferred From	Ref
FW	(Thailand) Adisak Kraisorn	(Thailand) Muangthong United F.C.	Season loan
FW	(Brazil) Heberty	(Thailand) Muangthong United F.C.	Until the end of 2020 (THB36.7m loan fee)

==== Out ====
Position	Player	Transferred To	Ref
MF	(Thailand) Adisorn Daeng-rueng	(Thailand) Nongbua Pitchaya F.C.	Free
DF	(Thailand) Panphanpong Pinkong	(Thailand) Sukhothai F.C.	Free
MF	(Thailand) Anon Samakorn	(Thailand) Nakhon Ratchasima F.C.	Free
MF	(Thailand) Sumanya Purisai	(Thailand) BG Pathum United F.C.	Undisclosed
MF	(Thailand) Jirattikan Vapilai	(Thailand) MOF Customs United F.C.	Free
FW	(Brazil) Josimar		Released

==== Return from loan ====
Position	Player	Transferred From	Ref
FW	(Thailand) Arthit Boodjinda	(Thailand) Chonburi F.C.	Loan return
FW	(Thailand) Chakrit Rawanprakone	(Thailand) MOF Customs United F.C.	Loan return
MF	(Thailand) Sansern Limwattana	(Thailand) Ayutthaya United F.C.	Loan return
DF	(Thailand) Yossawat Montha	(Thailand) Nongbua Pitchaya F.C.	Loan return
FW	(Thailand) Pinyo Inpinit	(Thailand) Nongbua Pitchaya F.C.	Loan return

==== Loan Out ====
Position	Player	Transferred To	Ref
MF	(Thailand) Nurul Sriyankem	(Thailand) Ratchaburi Mitr Phol F.C.	Season loan
FW	(Thailand) Arthit Boodjinda	(Thailand) Police Tero F.C.	Season loan

=== Mid-season transfer ===
==== In ====
Position	Player	Transferred From	Ref
DF	(Thailand) Thitawee Aksornsri	(Thailand) Police Tero F.C.	THB40m (include Thitathorn Aksornsri)
DF	(Thailand) Thitathorn Aksornsri	(Thailand) Police Tero F.C.	THB40m (include Thitawee Aksornsri)
FW	(Thailand) Pattharapol Jeamking	(Thailand) Chamchuri United F.C.	Free
DF	(Thailand) Worawut Namvech	(Thailand) Nongbua Pitchaya F.C.	Free
DF	(Thailand) Sarawut Kanlayanabandit	(Thailand) Samut Prakan City F.C.	Undisclosed

==== Loan In ====
Position	Player	Transferred From	Ref
FW	(El Salvador) Nelson Bonilla	(Thailand) Bangkok United F.C.	Season loan

==== Out ====
Position	Player	Transferred To	Ref
FW	(Thailand) Chakrit Rawanprakone	(Thailand) Muangkan United F.C.	Free
FW	(Thailand) Tanakorn Dangthong	(Thailand) MOF Customs United F.C.	Free
DF	(Thailand) Athibordee Atirat	(Thailand) BG Pathum United F.C.	Undisclosed
FW	(Thailand) Chenrop Samphaodi	(Thailand) BG Pathum United F.C.	Undisclosed
FW	(Thailand) Pinyo Inpinit	(Thailand) BG Pathum United F.C.	Undisclosed

==== Return from loan ====
Position	Player	Transferred From	Ref

==== Loan Out ====
Position	Player	Transferred To	Ref
MF	(Thailand) Chanayut Jejue	(Thailand) Ayutthaya United F.C.	Season loan
DF	(Thailand) Yossawat Montha	(Thailand) Songkhla F.C.	Season loan
MF	(Thailand) Chatmongkol Thongkiri	(Thailand) Muangthong United F.C.	Season loan
DF	(Thailand) Jaturapat Sattham	(Thailand) Samut Prakan City F.C.	Season loan

=== Late-season transfer ===
==== In ====
Position	Player	Transferred From	Ref
FW	(Ivory Coast) Yannick Boli	(Thailand) Ratchaburi Mitr Phol F.C.	Free
FW	(Thailand) Nantawat Suankaew	(Thailand) BG Pathum United F.C.	Undisclosed
DF	(Thailand) Meechok Marhasaranukun	(Thailand) Suphanburi F.C.	Free

==== Loan In ====
Position	Player	Transferred From	Ref

==== Out ====
Position	Player	Transferred To	Ref
FW	(Thailand) Arthit Boodjinda	(Thailand) Police Tero F.C.	Undisclosed

==== Return from loan ====
Position	Player	Transferred From	Ref
MF	(Thailand) Nurul Sriyankem	(Thailand) Ratchaburi Mitr Phol F.C.	Loan Return
DF	(Thailand) Jaturapat Sattham	(Thailand) Samut Prakan City F.C.	Loan Return
FW	(Thailand) Arthit Boodjinda	(Thailand) Police Tero F.C.	Loan Return

==== Loan Out ====
Position	Player	Transferred To	Ref
FW	(Thailand) Nantawat Suankaew	(Thailand) Nongbua Pitchaya F.C.	Season loan
DF	(Thailand) Sarawut Kanlayanabandit	(Thailand) Muangthong United F.C.	Season loan
MF	(Thailand) Sansern Limwattana	(Thailand) Trat F.C.	Season loan
FW	(Thailand) Pattharapol Jiemking	(Thailand) Muang Loei United F.C.	Season loan
DF	(Thailand) Pollawat Buachoom	(Thailand) Satun United F.C.	Season loan
MF	(Thailand) Jakkrit Senkaew	(Thailand) Satun United F.C.	Season loan

== Competitions ==
=== Thailand Champions Cup ===
Win Draw Loss

2 February 2020	Chiangrai United (Thailand)	2-0	(Thailand) Port	Nonthaburi
	Lee Yong-rae 51'; Chaiyawat 55'	Report; News; Highlight; Full match		Stadium: SCG Stadium; Attendance: 6,044; Referee: Torpong Somsing (Thailand)

=== Thai League 1 ===
Win Draw Loss

16 February 2020 1	Port (Thailand)	4-1	(Thailand) Nakhon Ratchasima	Bangkok
	Sergio Suárez 5'; Heberty 30' 58'; Adisak 89'		Amadou 63'	Stadium: PAT Stadium; Attendance: 6,940; Referee: Chaireag Ngam-som

22 February 2020 2	Port (Thailand)	4-1	(Thailand) Samut Prakan City	Bangkok
	Go Seul-ki 29'; Sergio Suárez 49'; Heberty 69' (pen.); Adisak 90+3'		Chayawat 43'	Stadium: PAT Stadium; Attendance: 5,465; Referee: Sarayut Jakngoen

26 February 2020 3	Sukhothai (Thailand)	1-2	(Thailand) Port	Sukhothai
	John Baggio 9'		Rochela 21' (pen.); Sergio Suárez 76' (pen.)	Stadium: Thalay Luang Stadium; Attendance: 4,108; Referee: Sivakorn Pu-udom

1 March 2020 4	Buriram United (Thailand)	1–1	(Thailand) Port	Buriram
	Supachok 26'		Heberty 24'	Stadium: Chang Arena; Attendance: 15,252; Referee: Torphong Somsing

13 September 2020 5 (Note: The Thai League matches originally scheduled in March are postponed following the coronavirus outbreak.)	Port (Thailand)	0-2 (Lost by default)	(Thailand) Police Tero	Bangkok
				Stadium: PAT Stadium; Attendance: 1,386; Referee: Niwat Insa-ard

19 September 2020 6	Port (Thailand)	0–1	(Thailand) BG Pathum United	Bangkok
			Chenrop 13'	Stadium: PAT Stadium; Attendance: 1,357; Referee: Songkran Bunmeekiart

26 September 2020 7	Trat (Thailand)	2–3	(Thailand) Port	Trat
	Sittichok 39'; Azadzoy 67'		Heberty 33'; Nitipong 47'; Sergio Suárez 90'	Stadium: Trat province Stadium; Attendance: 1,249; Referee: Anusorn Nookaew

2 December 2020 8	Port (Thailand)	2–0	(Thailand) SCG Muangthong United	Pathum Thani
	Adisak 30'; Bonilla 86'	Report		Stadium: Leo Stadium; Attendance: 3,050; Referee: Mongkolchai Pechsri

18 October 2020 9	Rayong (Thailand)	2-7	(Thailand) Port	Rayong
	Pitbull 45'; Yordrak 47'	Report	Sergio Suárez 18' 18'; Tanasith 20'; Heberty 38' (pen.) 64'; Adisak 52' (pen.); Bordin 90+2'	Stadium: Rayong province Stadium; Attendance: 1,950; Referee: Wiwat Jumpaoon

24 October 2020 10	Port (Thailand)	2-1	(Thailand) PT Prachuap	Bangkok
	Adisak 7'; Sergio Suárez 66' (pen.)		Willen Mota 90+6' (pen.)	Stadium: Boonyachinda Stadium; Attendance: 1,548; Referee: Warintron Sassadee

31 October 2020 11	Bangkok United (Thailand)	0-1	(Thailand) Port	Pathum Thani
			Nattawut 87'	Stadium: Thammasat Stadium; Attendance: 2,568; Referee: Mongkolchai Pechsri

20 November 2020 12	Port (Thailand)	4-0	(Thailand) Suphanburi	Bangkok
	Sergio Suárez 9' 66' (pen.); Adisak 68'; Deeromram 83'			Stadium: PAT Stadium; Attendance: 2,970; Referee: Songkran Bunmeekiart

28 November 2020 13	Chonburi (Thailand)	0-2	(Thailand) Port	Chonburi
			Bonilla 44'; Adisak 90+4'	Stadium: Chonburi Stadium; Attendance: 4,295; Referee: Chaireag Ngam-som

13 December 2020 14	Port (Thailand)	3–1	(Thailand) Ratchaburi Mitr Phol	Bangkok
	Adisak 27'; Bonilla 35'; Nattawut 89'		Roller 78' (pen.)	Stadium: PAT Stadium; Attendance: 3,000; Referee: Sahapop Sriboonlue

31 January 2021 15	Singha Chiangrai United (Thailand)	1-2	(Thailand) Port	Chiang Rai
	Chaiyawat 3'		Nattawut 79'; Nurul 90+1'	Stadium: Singha Stadium; Attendance: 0 Referee: Sivakorn Pu-udom

27 December 2020 16	Samut Prakan City (Thailand)	6-3	(Thailand) Port	Samut Prakan
	Teerapol 5'; Jaroensak 7'; Peeradon 42' (pen.); Suphanan 56'; Tardeli 81'; Aris 83'		Sergio Suárez 25' (pen.); Adisak 45+1'; Bonilla 71'	Stadium: Samut Prakarn SAT Stadium; Attendance: 0 Referee: Anusorn Nookaew

6 February 2021 17	Port (Thailand)	1-0	(Thailand) Sukhothai	Bangkok
	Boli 90+4'			Stadium: PAT Stadium; Attendance: 0 Referee: Niwat Insa-ard

9 February 2021 18	Port (Thailand)	1–2	(Thailand) Buriram United	Bangkok
	Sergio Suárez 48'		Apiwat 80'; Maicon 82'	Stadium: PAT Stadium; Attendance: 0 Referee: Wiwat Jumpaoon

13 February 2021 19	Police Tero (Thailand)	2-0	(Thailand) Port	Bangkok
	Dragan 9'; Arthit 65'			Stadium: Boonyachinda Stadium; Attendance: 0 Referee: Torphong Somsing

17 February 2021 20	BG Pathum United (Thailand)	2-1	(Thailand) Port	Pathum Thani
	Victor 32'; Chenrop 86'		Go Seul-ki 30'	Stadium: Leo Stadium; Attendance: 0 Referee: Mongkolchai Pechsri

20 February 2021 21	Port (Thailand)	0-0	(Thailand) Trat	Trat
				Stadium: Trat province Stadium; Attendance: 0 Referee: Anusorn Nookaew

23 February 2021 22	Muangthong United (Thailand)	2–1	(Thailand) Port	Nonthaburi
	Mirzaev 51'; Popp 67' (pen.)		Sergio Suárez 61' (pen.)	Stadium: SCG Stadium; Referee: Sivakorn Pu-udom

28 February 2021 23	Port (Thailand)	3-1	(Thailand) Rayong	Bangkok
	Siwakorn 6'; Sergio Suárez 37' 83'		Matee 59'	Stadium: PAT Stadium; Referee: Sahapop Sriboonlue

3 March 2021 24	PT Prachuap (Thailand)	1–3	(Thailand) Port	Prachuap Khiri Khan
	Phumin 64'		Boli 29'; Pakorn 33'; Adisak 78'	Stadium: Sam Ao Stadium; Attendance: 1,025; Referee: Natee Choosuwan

7 March 2021 25	Port (Thailand)	2–2	(Thailand) Bangkok United	Bangkok
	Boli 44'; Sergio Suárez 69' (pen.)		Everton 52'; Heberty 80' (pen.)	Stadium: PAT Stadium; Attendance: 1,353; Referee: Anusorn Nookaew

10 March 2021 26	Suphanburi (Thailand)	0-2	(Thailand) Port	Suphanburi
			Boli 45+1'; Bonilla 72'	Stadium: Suphan Buri Provincial Stadium; Attendance: 2,953; Referee: Torphong Somsing

14 March 2021 27	Port (Thailand)	2–1	(Thailand) Chonburi	Bangkok
	Jaturapat 46'; Bordin 90+5'		Eliandro 63'	Stadium: PAT Stadium; Attendance: 2,876; Referee: Niwat Insa-ard

17 March 2021 28	Ratchaburi Mitr Phol (Thailand)	0-0	(Thailand) Port	Ratchaburi
				Stadium: Mitr Phol Stadium; Attendance: 3,568; Referee: Kotchapoom Meesridaecha

20 March 2021 29	Port (Thailand)	0-1	(Thailand) Singha Chiangrai United	Bangkok
			Bill 86'	Stadium: PAT Stadium; Attendance: 2,868; Referee: Wiwat Jumpaoon

28 March 2021 30	Nakhon Ratchasima (Thailand)	2-2	(Thailand) Port	Nakhon Ratchasima
	Dennis 45+1' 61' (pen.)		Bonilla 58'; Adisak 71'	Stadium: 80th Birthday Stadium; Attendance: 12,296; Referee: Winat Phophat

=== Thai FA Cup ===
Win Draw Loss

7 November 2020 Round 1	Bangkok (Thailand)	2-4 (a.e.t.)	(Thailand) Port	Pathum Thani
	Supawit Rompopak 17' <be> Sakda Koomgun 87'		Bonilla 73'; Sergio Suárez 75'; Chappuis 92'; Thitathorn 103'	Stadium: Bangkok University Stadium; Attendance: 309; Referee: Niwat Insa-ard

6 December 2020 Round 2	Port (Thailand)	6-3	(Thailand) Customs United	Bangkok
	Nattawut 12', 25'; Adisak 75'; Bonilla 78', 90+3'; Rochela 90' (pen.)		Deyvison Fernandes 56', 64' (pen.); Rachata Thanaphonmongkhon 90+1'	Stadium: PAT Stadium; Attendance: 1,903; Referee: Sarayut Jakngoen

3 February 2021 Last 16	Port (Thailand)	0–0 (a.e.t.) (8–9 p)	(Thailand) Buriram United	Bangkok
				Stadium: PAT Stadium; Attendance: 0 Referee: Chaireag Ngam-som
	Penalties
	David Rochela (penalty scored); Sergio Suárez (penalty scored); Siwakorn Jakkuprasat (penalty scored); Go Seul-ki (penalty scored); Adisak Kraisorn (penalty scored); Tanasith Siripala (penalty missed); Nattawut Sombatyotha (penalty scored); Kevin Deeromram (penalty scored); Nitipong Selanon (penalty scored); Tanaboon Kesarat (penalty missed)		(penalty scored) Ratthanakorn Maikami; (penalty scored) Sasalak Haiprakhon; (penalty scored) Pansa Hemviboon; (penalty scored) Suphanat Mueanta; (penalty scored) Siwarak Tedsungnoen; (penalty missed) Chakkit Laptrakul; (penalty scored) Maicon Marques; (penalty scored) Tinnakorn Asurin; (penalty scored) Jakkaphan Kaewprom; (penalty scored) Narubadin Weerawatnodom

=== Thai League Cup ===
Win Draw Loss

=== AFC Champions League ===
Win Draw Loss

21 January 2020 Preliminary round 2	Port (Thailand)	0-1	(Philippines) Ceres–Negros	Bangkok
		Live Report; Stats Report	Schröck 51'	Stadium: PAT Stadium; Attendance: 6,234; Referee: Yu Ming-hsun (Chinese Taipei)

== Team statistics ==
=== Appearances and goals ===
As of 28 March 2021

No.	Pos.	Player	League		FA Cup		AFC Champions League		Total	
No.	Pos.	Player	Apps.	Goals	Apps.	Goals	Apps.	Goals	Apps.	Goals
1	GK	(Thailand) Watchara Buathong	0	0	0	0	0	0	0	0
2	DF	(Thailand) Thitawee Aksornsri	3+1	0	2	0	0	0	5+1	0
3	DF	(Thailand) Thitathorn Aksornsri	1	0	1	1	0	0	2	1
4	DF	(Thailand) Elias Dolah	21+1	0	1	0	1	0	23+1	0
5	FW	(Spain) Sergio Suárez	27	15	2+1	1	1	0	30+1	16
6	DF	(Thailand) Todsapol Lated	3+1	0	0	0	0	0	3+1	0
7	MF	(Thailand) Pakorn Prempak	16+2	1	1+1	0	1	0	18+3	1
8	MF	(South Korea) Go Seul-ki	25	2	1	0	1	0	27	2
9	FW	(Thailand) Adisak Kraisorn	14+15	11	0+3	1	0+1	0	14+19	12
10	MF	(Thailand) Bordin Phala	21+6	1	1+1	0	1	0	23+7	1
11	MF	(Thailand) Tanasith Siripala	4+12	1	2+1	0	0+1	0	6+14	1
13	MF	(Thailand) Nurul Sriyankem	2+9	1	0+1	0	0	0	2+10	1
14	MF	(Thailand) Tawin Mahajindawong	0+1	0	0	0	0	0	0+1	0
15	DF	(Philippines) Martin Steuble	10+1	0	0	0	0	0	10+1	0
16	MF	(Thailand) Siwakorn Jakkuprasat	23	1	0+1	0	1	0	24+1	1
17	MF	(Thailand) Charyl Chappuis	5+7	0	3	1	0	0	8+7	1
18	GK	(Thailand) Rattanai Songsangchan	11	0	2	0	0	0	13	0
20	DF	(Thailand) Adisorn Promrak	2+2	0	2	0	0	0	4+2	0
21	DF	(Thailand) Jaturapat Sattham	5+4	1	0	0	0	0	5+4	1
22	DF	(Spain) David Rochela	4	1	2	1	0	0	6	2
23	DF	(Thailand) Kevin Deeromram	15+1	1	2+1	0	1	0	19+1	1
24	DF	(Thailand) Worawut Namvech	17+1	0	0	0	0	0	17+1	0
25	GK	(Thailand) Chatcharin Phutangdaen	0	0	0	0	0	0	0	0
31	MF	(Thailand) Kannarin Thawornsak	8+10	0	1	0	0	0	9+10	0
34	DF	(Thailand) Nitipong Selanon	30	1	1+1	0	1	0	32+1	1
36	GK	(Thailand) Worawut Srisupha	19	0	1	0	1	0	21	0
45	MF	(Thailand) Nattawut Sombatyotha	0+19	3	2+1	2	0	0	2+20	5
70	FW	(Thailand) Phodchara Chainarong	0	0	0	0	0	0	0	0
71	MF	(Thailand) Tanaboon Kesarat	10+2	0	2	0	1	0	13+2	0
94	FW	(Ivory Coast) Yannick Boli	11+5	4	0	0	0	0	11+5	4
99	FW	(El Salvador) Nelson Bonilla	14+6	6	3	3	0	0	17+6	9
Players who have played this season and/or sign for the season but had left the club or on loan to other clubs
37	FW	(Brazil) Heberty	9	7	0	0	1	0	10	7
14	MF	(Thailand) Chatmongkol Thongkiri	0+1	0	0	0	0	0	0+1	0
69	MF	(Thailand) Sansern Limwattana	0+1	0	1	0	0	0	1+1	0

== Overall summary ==
=== Season summary ===
Games played	35 (1 Champions Cup, 30 Thai League, 3 FA Cup, 1 AFC Champions League)
Games won	19 (0 Champions Cup, 17 Thai League, 2 FA Cup, 0 AFC Champions League)
Games drawn	6 (0 Champions Cup, 5 Thai League, 1 FA Cup, 0 AFC Champions League)
Games lost	10 (1 Champions Cup, 8 Thai League, 0 FA Cup, 1 AFC Champions League)
Goals scored	92 (0 Champions Cup, 58 Thai League, 10 FA Cup, 0 AFC Champions League)
Goals conceded	57 (2 Champions Cup, 36 Thai League, 5 FA Cup, 1 AFC Champions League)
Goal difference	+24
Clean sheets	8 (0 Champions Cup, 8 Thai League, 0 FA Cup, 0 AFC Champions League)
Best result	7-2 vs Rayong (18 Oct 20)
Worst result	3-6 vs Samut Prakan City (27 Dec 20)
Most appearances	Adisak Kraisorn and Nitipong Selanon (34)
Top scorer	Sergio Suárez (16)
Points	56

=== Score overview ===
Opposition	Home score	Away score	Double
Bangkok United	2-2	0–1	No
BG Pathum United	0–1	2-1	No
Buriram United	1-2	1–1	No
Chonburi	2-1	0-2	Yes
Muangthong United	2-0	2–1	No
Nakhon Ratchasima	4-1	2-2	No
Police Tero	0-2	2–0	No
PT Prachuap	2-1	1–3	Yes
Ratchaburi Mitr Phol	3-1	0-0	No
Rayong	3–1	2-7	Yes
Samut Prakan City	4-1	6-3	No
Singha Chiangrai United	0–1	1–2	No
Sukhothai	1-0	1-2	Yes
Suphanburi	4-0	0-2	Yes
Trat	0-0	2–3	No
