= Park Seon-hong =

Korean association football player

Personal information
- Date of birth: 5 November 1993 (age 33)
- Height: 1.78 m (5 ft 10 in)
- Position: Midfielder

Team information
- Current team: Nakhon Si United

Youth career
- 2010–2011: Janghoon HS
- 2012: Daedong Taxation HS
- 2013–2014: Jeonju University

Senior career*
| Years | Team | Apps | (Gls) |
| 2015–2016 | Gwangju | 11 | (1) |
| 2017–2018 | Jeonbuk Jeonju City | | |
| 2019– | Nakhon Si United | | |
- * Club domestic league appearances and goals as of 14:18, 14 July 2020 (UTC)

- Park Seon-hong
- Hangul: 박선홍
- RR: Bak Seonhong
- MR: Pak Sŏnhong

Park Seon-hong (Korean: 박선홍; born 5 November 1993) is a South Korean footballer who plays as a midfielder for Nakhon Si United.

== Career statistics ==
=== Club ===
As of 14 July 2020.

| Club | Season | League | | | Cup | | Other | | Total | |
| Club | Season | Division | Apps | Goals | Apps | Goals | Apps | Goals | Apps | Goals |
|---|---|---|---|---|---|---|---|---|---|---|
| Gwangju | 2015 | K League Classic | 10 | 1 | 1 (Note: Appearances in the Korean FA Cup) | 0 | 0 | 0 | 11 | 1 |
| Gwangju | 2016 | K League Classic | 1 | 0 | 2 | 0 | 0 | 0 | 3 | 0 |
| Career total | | | 11 | 1 | 3 | 0 | 0 | 0 | 14 | 1 |
