= 2020 Thai League Cup =

Football tournament season

Toyota League Cup

Tournament details
- Country: Thailand
- Dates: 22 February 2020
- Teams: 85

The 2020 Thai League Cup was the 11th season in the second era of a Thailand's knockout football competition. All rounds were played in a single-leg format. The tournament, known as the Toyota League Cup (Thai: โตโยต้า ลีกคัพ), was sponsored by Toyota. 85 clubs were accepted into the tournament, and it began with the first qualification round on 22 February 2020. The tournament has been readmitted back into Thai football after a 10-year absence. The prize money for this prestigious award was said to be around 5 million baht for the tournament winners, and 1 million baht for the second-place team.

This was the first edition of the competition with the qualifying rounds played in regions featuring clubs from Thai League 3 and Thai League 4.

On 5 August 2020, Football Association of Thailand cancelled the 2020 League Cup due to COVID-19 pandemic, and the main sponsor Toyota's withdrawal of support for the tournament due to the economic impact of the pandemic.

== Calendar ==
| Round | Date | Matches | Clubs | New entries this round |
|---|---|---|---|---|
| First qualification round | 22 February 2020 | 22 | 17 + 27 → 22 | 17 2020 Thai League 3; 27 2020 Thai League 4 |
| Second qualification round | 22 February 2020 and 21 March 2020 | 15 | 22 + 2 + 6 → 15 | 2 2020 Thai League 3; 6 2020 Thai League 4 |
| Qualification play-off round | Cancelled | 16 | 15 + 17 → 16 | 17 2020 Thai League 2 |
| First round | Cancelled | 16 | 16 + 16 → 16 | 16 2020 Thai League 1 |
| Second round | Cancelled | 8 | 16 → 8 | |
| Quarter-finals | Cancelled | 4 | 8 → 4 | |
| Semi-finals | Cancelled | 2 | 4 → 2 | |
| Final | Cancelled | 1 | 2 → Champions | |
| Total | | | | 85 clubs |

== Results ==
Note: T1: Clubs from Thai League 1; T2: Clubs from Thai League 2; T3: Clubs from Thai League 3; T4: Clubs from Thai League 4.

=== First qualification round ===
There were 17 clubs from 2020 Thai League 3 and 27 clubs from 2020 Thai League 4 have signed to first qualifying in 2020 Thai League cup. This round had drawn on 6 February 2020.

Northern region
The qualifying round was played in the northern region, featuring 4 clubs from the 2020 Thai League 4 Northern Region and 4 clubs from the 2020 Thai League 3 Upper Region.

| 22 February 2020 | Maejo United (T4) | 2 – 1 (a.e.t.) | Lamphun Warrior (T3) | San Sai, Chiangmai |
| 15:30 (UTC+7) | Wichaya Pornprasart 25', 109' | Report | Sirisak Masbu-ngor 87' | Stadium: Maejo University Stadium; Attendance: 183; Referee: Woottipong Ketkam; Assistant referees: Prachya Lertwanichcha, Eakachai Polsuwan; Fourth official: Tudsanee Khuanpet |

| 22 February 2020 | Kamphaengphet (T3) | 0 – 0 (a.e.t.) (4 – 3 p) | Chiangrai Lanna (T4) | Mueang, Kamphaengphet |
| 15:30 (UTC+7) | | Report | | Stadium: Kamphaengphet PAO. Stadium; Attendance: 350; Referee: Samrit Ritkaew; Assistant referees: Pathompong Anunluksanakul, Veeraporn Maophaeo; Fourth official: Chaikrit Inboonsong |
| | Penalties |
| | Somphong Deerum (penalty scored); Kawin Nuanthat (penalty scored); Anuwat Promyotha (penalty scored); Theerawat Lammark (penalty scored) | | (penalty scored) Anusorn Khieochaoom; (penalty scored) Anut Inthachai; (penalty scored) Suphawit Prachuabsuk; (penalty missed) Wittawat Sailam; (penalty missed) Warawut Boonnet |

| 22 February 2020 | Chiangrai City (T3) | 2 – 1 (a.e.t.) | Nakhon Mae Sot United (T4) | Mueang, Chiangrai |
| 17:00 (UTC+7) | Piyarot Kwangkaew 3'; Nantawat Tansopa 111' | Report | Sorot Puangkhamma 75' | Stadium: Chiangrai Provincial Stadium; Attendance: 150; Referee: Yuttana Sadkrathok; Assistant referees: Arnon Ditkhunthod, Opars Oomsomsuai; Fourth official: Thanet Jairaw |

| 22 February 2020 | Uttaradit (T4) | 4 – 0 | Wat Bot City (T3) | Mueang, Uttaradit |
| 18:00 (UTC+7) | Chaipat Cheamsirijan 3'; Anucha Phantong 27'; Sere William Vieram'Boa 36'; Diarra Junior Aboubacar 90+2' | Report | | Stadium: Uttaradit Provincial Stadium; Attendance: 669; Referee: Polson Seetao; Assistant referees: Nattapong Wadweangcom, Kittikun Soisee; Fourth official: Anan Keawmuangkhun |

Northeastern region
The qualifying round was played in the northeastern region, featuring 6 clubs from the 2020 Thai League 4 Northeastern Region and 2 clubs from the 2020 Thai League 3 Upper Region.

| 22 February 2020 | Surin Khong Chee Mool (T4) | 2 – 3 (a.e.t.) | Ubon Kruanapat (T3) | Mueang, Surin |
| 15:30 (UTC+7) | Jattuphon Nueakaew 37'; Tirawut Thiwato 66' | Report | Jakre Burapha 14' (pen.); David Bayiha 34'; Phongchana Kongkirit 94' | Stadium: Rajamangala University of Technology Isan Surin Campus Stadium; Attendance: 150; Referee: Apidet Vongsa; Assistant referees: Narinnart Tiamskun, Uthai Purase; Fourth official: Nattakit Chaiyakhun |

| 22 February 2020 | Khon Kaen Mordindang (T4) | 1 – 0 | Nakhon Ratchasima United (T4) | Mueang, Khon Kaen |
| 15:30 (UTC+7) | Peerawis Ritsriboon 54' | Report | | Stadium: Khon Kaen University Stadium; Attendance: 100; Referee: Songkiat Chaengchan; Assistant referees: Nattapakorn Suwannatip, Surawut Nuanyoi; Fourth official: Wayu Ontama |

| 22 February 2020 | Sisaket United (T4) | 2 – 7 (a.e.t.) | Muang Loei United (T3) | Mueang, Sisaket |
| 15:30 (UTC+7) | Jakkapan Phaopan 16'; Tanagrit Noramas 26' (pen.) | Report | Célio Guilherme da Silva Santos 7', 12', 96', 116'; Chokchai Sukthed 98'; Thitiphong Photumtha 100' (o.g.); Emmanuel Kwame Akadom 109' | Stadium: Sri Nakhon Lamduan Stadium; Attendance: 134; Referee: Suriyo Kanhachalee; Assistant referees: Authen Dansalao, Waratchanon Chombun; Fourth official: Palakon Hasuk |

| 22 February 2020 | Mahasarakham (T4) | 1 – 0 | Udon United (T4) | Mueang, Mahasarakham |
| 15:30 (UTC+7) | Nitipong Ruangsa 72' | Report | | Stadium: Mahasarakham Provincial Stadium; Attendance: 322; Referee: Alongkorn Visasnakorn; Assistant referees: Ittipon Homdee, Akkadet Jantarangsee; Fourth official: Prakasit Chantarasawang |

Eastern region
The qualifying round was played in the eastern region, featuring 5 clubs from the 2020 Thai League 4 Eastern Region, 2 clubs from the 2020 Thai League 3 Upper Region, and 1 club from the 2020 Thai League 3 Lower Region.

| 22 February 2020 | Kohkwang (T4) | 2 – 0 | Saimit Kabin United (T4) | Mueang, Chanthaburi |
| 15:30 (UTC+7) | Arnon Dugsee 68'; Kittipat Tamngam 89' | Report | | Stadium: Rambhai Barni Rajabhat University Stadium; Attendance: 255; Referee: Kamphol Kaewsaard; Assistant referees: Ponchanarusorn Sorajapinyo, Wararit Suwanjira; Fourth official: Teerachai Champa |

| 22 February 2020 | Marines Eureka (T4) | 2 – 2 (a.e.t.) (3 – 2 p) | Bankhai United (T4) | Sattahip, Chonburi |
| 17:00 (UTC+7) | Sakmongkol Kwangkhwang 50'; Nitiphoom Phoonguen 90+2' | Report | Apiwit Samurmuen 61'; Ratchanon Phothison 81' | Stadium: Sattahip Navy Stadium; Attendance: 325; Referee: Suchat Fangmala; Assistant referees: Watcharit Longjit, Peeyaporn Worachaikueakun; Fourth official: Chomrat Yukcharensap |
| | Penalties |
| | Jakrayut Vivatvanit (penalty scored); Veerapat Homjan (penalty missed); Worachet Prapaipak (penalty scored); Wutthichai Ramphanphosri (penalty missed); Teerachai Kongwong (penalty scored) | | (penalty scored) Oumar Sanou; (penalty scored) Jakkapong Pholjuang; (penalty missed) Ratchanon Khotchana; (penalty missed) Ratchanon Phothison; (penalty missed) Tebnimit Buransri |

| 22 February 2020 | Sakaeo (T3) | 3 – 1 | Banbueng (T3) | Mueang, Sakaeo |
| 18:00 (UTC+7) | Sutee Khamcha 23'; Ahmed Ayman Shamsaldin Abdalazem 52' (pen.); Noppanai Charoenrung 83' | Report | Berlin Ndebe-Nlome 38' | Stadium: Sakaeo PAO. Stadium; Attendance: 500; Referee: Suttipong Tepa; Assistant referees: Burin Kaenjan, Adisai Pongnairat; Fourth official: Thawatchai Sangsanit |

| 22 February 2020 | Chachoengsao Hi-Tek (T3) | 0 – 3 | Pluakdaeng United (T4) | Mueang, Chachoengsao |
| 18:30 (UTC+7) | | Report | Mustapha Allaoui 48'; Alongkorn Nuekmai 50'; Warut Trongkratok 73' | Stadium: Chachoengsao Municipality Stadium; Attendance: 684; Referee: Gritchai Saenmart; Assistant referees: Kanoksak Khiaodaeng, Anantip Phopan; Fourth official: Nikom Wangsang |

Bangkok metropolitan region
The qualifying round was played in Bangkok metropolitan region featuring 2 clubs from the 2020 Thai League 4 Bangkok Metropolitan Region, 1 club from the 2020 Thai League 3 Upper Region, and 3 clubs from the 2020 Thai League 3 Lower Region.

| 22 February 2020 | Thonburi University (T4) | 2 – 1 (a.e.t.) | Kasem Bundit University (T3) | Nong Khaem, Bangkok |
| 15:30 (UTC+7) | Piyaphong Phrueksupee 70' (pen.), 99' | Report | Whang Soo-young 44' | Stadium: Thonburi University Stadium; Attendance: 270; Referee: Patiyut Monthianart; Assistant referees: Atachai Kongkaew, Jakkaphan Rinsarn; Fourth official: Nattawat Nunmeeslri |

| 22 February 2020 | Bang Pa-in Ayutthaya (T3) | 1 – 1 (a.e.t.) (3 – 5 p) | Royal Thai Air Force (T4) | Bang Pa-in, Ayutthaya |
| 15:30 (UTC+7) | Teerapat Laohabut 12' | Report | Thotsapron Sretthaphakdi 82' | Stadium: Bang Pa-in School Stadium; Attendance: 893; Referee: Yodsakorn Pakdeesuwan; Assistant referees: Kittiwat Kittpaksakun, Sunita Thongthawin; Fourth official: Chawanat Chalachai |
| | Penalties |
| | Chanayut Srisawat (penalty scored); Teerapat Laohabut (penalty missed); Atsadayut Pholbua (penalty scored); Saharat Khumpub (penalty scored) | | (penalty scored) Ginjiro Chiba; (penalty scored) Watcharapong Junngam; (penalty scored) Thummada Kokyai; (penalty scored) Thotsapron Sretthaphakdi; (penalty scored) Piyakit Eangprayoon |

| 22 February 2020 | Bangkok (T3) | 0 – 1 | BTU United (T3) | Thawi Watthana, Bangkok |
| 18:00 (UTC+7) | | Report | Woraphot Somsang 14' | Stadium: Bangkokthonburi University Stadium; Attendance: 500; Referee: Somsuk Poosomnuek; Assistant referees: Piyapat Pisaree, Jarun Janeam; Fourth official: Trin Sahachaipat |

Southern region
The qualifying round would have been played in the southern region, featuring 7 clubs from the 2020 Thai League 4 Southern Region and 3 clubs from the 2020 Thai League 3 Lower Region.

| 22 February 2020 | Pattani (T3) | 1 – 1 (a.e.t.) (5 – 4 p) | Surat Thani City (T4) | Mueang, Pattani |
| 15:30 (UTC+7) | Manso Ausman 17' | Report | Amarin Chaisuesat 7' | Stadium: Pattani Provincial Stadium; Attendance: 1,444; Referee: Manop Lempan; Assistant referees: Hasadin Noorid, Preecha Lanui; Fourth official: Apirat Kreeso |
| | Penalties |
| | Mitsada Saitaifah (penalty scored); Vincent Bossou (penalty scored); Sakeereen Teekasom (penalty scored); Abdulhakeem Da-oh (penalty missed); Victor Marcelo Alves Alcantara (penalty scored); Safi-e Hahmah (penalty scored) | | (penalty scored) Pongdet Chaima; (penalty scored) Piyabut Srichaiwal; (penalty scored) Atitthan Kongsarp; (penalty scored) Suttipong Yatfai; (penalty missed) Pedro Augusto Silva Rodrigues; (penalty missed) Aekkaphon Fangnongdu |

| 22 February 2020 | Jalor City (T4) | 0 – 2 | Krabi (T3) | Mueang, Yala |
| 15:30 (UTC+7) | | Report | Efe Obode 29', 47' | Stadium: Yala Municipality Stadium; Attendance: 450; Referee: Matoha Sayo; Assistant referees: Mongkhon Kaisin, Phongsiri Chusi; Fourth official: Sukarnai Beraheng |

| 22 February 2020 | Nakhon Si United (T3) | 2 – 0 | Surat Thani (T4) | Ron Phibun, Nakhon Si Thammarat |
| 15:30 (UTC+7) | Thamanoon Salee 8'; Lucas Marques da Silva 45' | Report | | Stadium: Nakhon Si Thammarat PAO. Stadium; Attendance: 400; Referee: Wichai Pannil; Assistant referees: Danusorn Boondej, Vorawit Promsangkaha; Fourth official: Mayara Day |

| 22 February 2020 | Hatyai City (T4) | 1 – 1 (a.e.t.) (4 – 3 p) | Phatthalung (T4) | Hat Yai, Songkhla |
| 15:30 (UTC+7) | Chajouei Mahdi Mohammad 36' | Report | Shogo Nakamura 45' | Stadium: Southern Major City Stadium; Attendance: 109; Referee: Yod Damhai; Assistant referees: Anon Sottikumhang, Heesham Doloh; Fourth official: Sirikwan Chankerd |
| | Penalties |
| | Muhammad Lah-alee (penalty missed); Kittiphant Chanpho (penalty scored); Chajouei Mahdi Mohammad (penalty scored); Ni-iffarn Patarathikul (penalty missed); Teerapat Penjamras (penalty scored); Abdulkoday Kaso (penalty scored) | | (penalty scored) Autthagowit Jantod; (penalty missed) Shogo Nakamura; (penalty scored) Jaruwat Potisai; (penalty scored) Jamlas Pumchaisong; (penalty missed) Amnat Sooknoi; (penalty missed) Surachat Suwannatanon |

| 22 February 2020 | Songkhla (T4) | 2 – 0 | Patong City (T4) | Hat Yai, Songkhla |
| 15:30 (UTC+7) | Darlan Martins Benvindo 7'; Thammasak Thammarak 34' | Report | | Stadium: Prince of Songkla University Stadium; Attendance: 524; Referee: Jarae Khunjaroen; Assistant referees: Mayunai Kueteh, Montree Yeereem; Fourth official: Artit Srinoy |

=== Second qualification round ===
The second qualifying round would have featured 22 clubs, which were the winners of the first qualification round (10 clubs from T3 and 12 clubs from T4) and the new entries including 2 clubs from the 2020 Thai League 3 and 6 clubs from the 2020 Thai League 4.

Northern region
The second qualifying round would be played in the northern region featured by 4 clubs which were the winners of the first qualification round (2 clubs from T3 and 2 clubs from T4) and the new entries including 2 clubs from the 2020 Thai League 4 Northern Region.

| 22 February 2020 | See Khwae City (T4) | 1 – 1 (a.e.t.) (2 – 3 p) | Phitsanulok (T4) | Mueang, Nakhon Sawan |
| 15:30 (UTC+7) | Natthapong Seesai 118' | Report | Wasan Chomkason 119' | Stadium: Nakhon Sawan Sport School Stadium; Attendance: 361; Referee: Poowasak Sukunt; Assistant referees: Adison Peungsatit, Aekkarach Sirithai; Fourth official: Chalit Ploypech |
| | Penalties |
| | Boonmee Wanlang (penalty scored); Samart Phomee (penalty missed); Permyot Tokeaw (penalty missed); Thitikarn Rueangsuksud (penalty missed); Chirayut Chaophonkrang (penalty scored) | | (penalty missed) Chatchai Narkwijit; (penalty missed) Saeid Chahjouei; (penalty scored) Kiadtisak Nantavichianrit; (penalty scored) Chirayut Thongsom; (penalty scored) Wasan Chomkason |

| 21 March 2020 | Uttaradit (T4) | Cancelled | Maejo United (T4) | Mueang, Uttaradit |
| 15:30 (UTC+7) | | [ Report] | | Stadium: Uttaradit Provincial Stadium |

| 21 March 2020 | Chiangrai City (T3) | Cancelled | Kamphaengphet (T3) | Mueang, Chiangrai |
| 15:30 (UTC+7) | | [ Report] | | Stadium: Chiangrai Provincial Stadium |

Northeastern region
The second qualifying round would be played in the northeastern region featured by 4 clubs which were the winners of the first qualification round (2 clubs from T3 and 2 clubs from T4).

| 21 March 2020 | Ubon Kruanapat (T3) | Cancelled | Khon Kaen Mordindang (T4) | Mueang, Ubon Ratchathani |
| 15:30 (UTC+7) | | [ Report] | | Stadium: Ubon Rachathani Sports School Stadium |

| 21 March 2020 | Muang Loei United (T3) | Cancelled | Mahasarakham (T4) | Wang Saphung, Loei |
| 15:30 (UTC+7) | | [ Report] | | Stadium: Wang Saphung Stadium |

Eastern region
The second qualifying round would be played in the eastern region featured by 4 clubs which were the winners of the first qualification round (1 club from T3 and 3 clubs from T4) and the new entries including 2 clubs from the 2020 Thai League 4 Eastern Region.

| 22 February 2020 | Royal Thai Fleet (T4) | 1 – 3 (a.e.t.) | Chanthaburi (T4) | Sattahip, Chonburi |
| 15:30 (UTC+7) | Sathaphon Panmisi 44' | Report | Tripop Janoensheep 84'; Pradipat Armatuntri 100'; Kritsada Taiwong 110' | Stadium: Battleship Stadium; Attendance: 350; Referee: Boonjaroen Pochai; Assistant referees: Poomin Lanamtaing, Suksan Thongkoed; Fourth official: Samruam Lamai |

| 21 March 2020 | Kohkwang (T4) | Cancelled | Pluakdaeng United (T4) | Mueang, Chanthaburi |
| 15:30 (UTC+7) | | [ Report] | | Stadium: Rambhai Barni Rajabhat University Stadium |

| 21 March 2020 | Marines Eureka (T4) | Cancelled | Sakaeo (T3) | Sattahip, Chonburi |
| 15:30 (UTC+7) | | [ Report] | | Stadium: Sattahip Navy Stadium |

Western region
The second qualifying round would be played in the western region featured by 2 clubs which were the winners of the first qualification round (1 club from T3 and 1 club from T4).

| 21 March 2020 | Muangkan United (T3) | Cancelled | Saraburi United (T4) | Mueang, Kanchanaburi |
| 15:30 (UTC+7) | | [ Report] | | Stadium: Kanchanaburi Provincial Stadium |

Bangkok metropolitan region
The second qualifying round would be played in the Bangkok metropolitan region featured by 3 clubs which were the winners of the first qualification round (1 club from T3 and 2 clubs from T4) and the new entries including 2 clubs from the 2020 Thai League 4 Bangkok Metropolitan Region and 1 club from the 2020 Thai League 3 Lower Region.

| 22 February 2020 | Grakcu Sai Mai United (T4) | 0 – 1 (a.e.t.) | Samut Prakan (T4) | Sai Mai, Bangkok |
| 15:30 (UTC+7) | | Report | Rody Jossephe Zambrano Marcillo 103' | Stadium: Grakcu Sai Mai Stadium; Attendance: 450; Referee: Tosapornsil Sittisena; Assistant referees: Aidsara Gaedthai, Chanon Jiwthad; Fourth official: Anusit Sirimua |

| 21 March 2020 | BTU United (T3) | Cancelled | Rajpracha (T3) | Thawi Watthana, Bangkok |
| 15:30 (UTC+7) | | [ Report] | | Stadium: Bangkokthonburi University Stadium |

| 21 March 2020 | Thonburi University (T4) | Cancelled | Royal Thai Air Force (T4) | Nong Khaem, Bangkok |
| 15:30 (UTC+7) | | [ Report] | | Stadium: Thonburi University Stadium |

Southern region
The second qualifying round would be played in the southern region featured by 5 clubs which were the winners of the first qualification round (3 clubs from T3 and 2 clubs from T4) and the new entry that is a club from the 2020 Thai League 3 Lower Region.

| 21 March 2020 | Songkhla (T4) | Cancelled | Nara United (T3) | Hat Yai, Songkhla |
| 15:30 (UTC+7) | | [ Report] | | Stadium: Prince of Songkla University Stadium |

| 21 March 2020 | Pattani (T3) | Cancelled | Krabi (T3) | Mueang, Pattani |
| 15:30 (UTC+7) | | [ Report] | | Stadium: Pattani Provincial Stadium |

| 21 March 2020 | Nakhon Si United (T3) | Cancelled | Hatyai City (T4) | Ron Phibun, Nakhon Si Thammarat |
| 15:30 (UTC+7) | | [ Report] | | Stadium: Nakhon Si Thammarat PAO. Stadium |

== See also ==
- 2020–21 Thai League 1
- 2020–21 Thai League 2
- 2020–21 Thai League 3
- 2020–21 Thai League 3 Northern Region
- 2020–21 Thai League 3 Northeastern Region
- 2020–21 Thai League 3 Eastern Region
- 2020–21 Thai League 3 Western Region
- 2020–21 Thai League 3 Southern Region
- 2020–21 Thai League 3 Bangkok Metropolitan Region
- 2020–21 Thai League 3 National Championship
- 2020–21 Thai FA Cup
- 2020 Thailand Champions Cup
