= Cristhyan =

Brazilian footballer (born 2000)

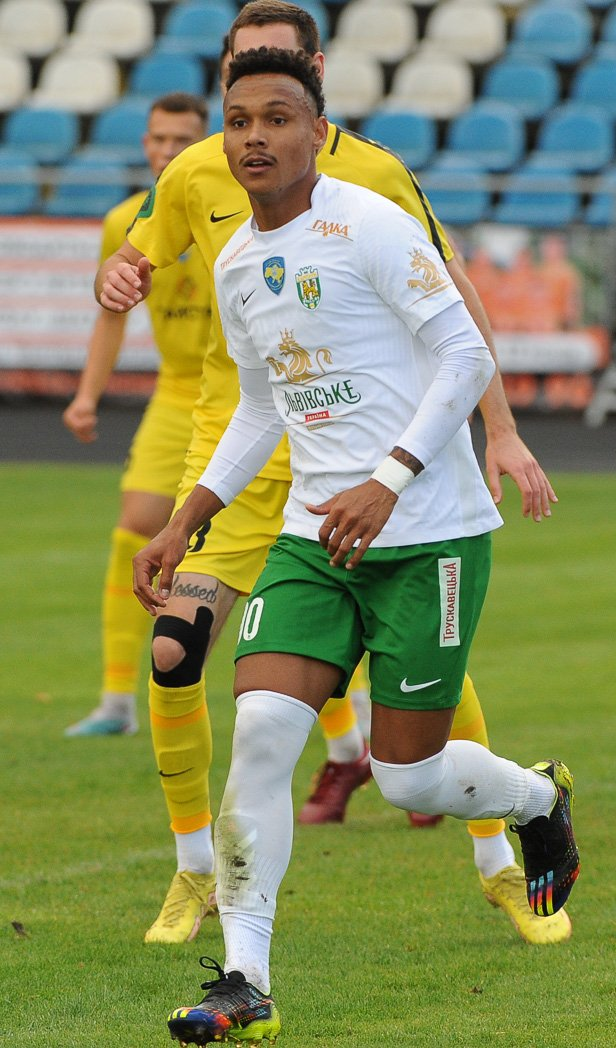

Personal information
- Full name: Cristhyan Noto Souza
- Date of birth: 21 May 2000 (age 26)
- Place of birth: Nova Crixás, Brazil
- Height: 1.82 m (6 ft 0 in)
- Position: Forward

Youth career
- Atlético Goianiense

Senior career*
Years	Team	Apps	(Gls)
2018–2020	Atlético Goianiense	18	(1)
2022	Concórdia	2	(0)
2023	Grêmio Anápolis	7	(1)
2023–2024	Ponte Preta	0	(0)
2023	→ Karpaty Lviv (loan)	8	(1)
2025–2026	Mġarr United	17	(18)
2026–	Nakhon Si United	0	(0)
- * Club domestic league appearances and goals as of 21 April 2026

Cristhyan Noto Souza (born 21 May 2000), simply known as Cristhyan, is a Brazilian footballer who plays as a forward for Thai League 3 side Nakhon Si United.

== Career statistics ==
As of 12 March 2020.

Club	Season	League			State League		Cup		Continental		Other		Total	
Club	Season	Division	Apps	Goals	Apps	Goals	Apps	Goals	Apps	Goals	Apps	Goals	Apps	Goals
Atlético Goianiense	2018	Série B	3	0	12	1	1	0	—		—		16	1
Atlético Goianiense	2019	Série B	0	0	0	0	0	0	—		—		0	0
Atlético Goianiense	2020	Série A	0	0	3	0	1	0	—		—		4	0
Career total			3	0	15	1	1	0	0	0	0	0	20	1
