= 2020 Thai League 3 Lower Region =

Thai League 3
- Season: 2020
- Dates: 15 February 2020 – TBD
- Matches: 12
- Goals: 28 (2.33 per match)
- Top goalscorer: (Thailand) Sirichai Lamphuttha (3 goals)
- Biggest home win: 4 goals difference Bangkok 4–0 Banbueng (29 February 2020)
- Biggest away win: 3 goals difference Banbueng 1–4 Kasem Bundit University (16 February 2020)
- Highest scoring: 5 goals difference Banbueng 1–4 Kasem Bundit University (16 February 2020)
- Longest winning run: 2 Matches; Bangkok
- Longest unbeaten run: 2 Matches; Bangkok; North Bangkok University; Pattani; Pathumthani University; Trang
- Longest winless run: 2 Matches; Banbueng; BTU United; Nara United; Krabi; Nakhon Si United
- Longest losing run: 2 Matches; Banbueng

The 2020 Thai League 3 lower region is a region in the regional stage of the 2020 Thai League 3. A total of twelve teams will compete in the league of the lower region.

== Changes from prior season ==
=== Team changes ===
==== Promoted clubs ====
Two clubs were promoted from the 2020 Thai League 2

- Nakhon Pathom United
- Ranong United

Two clubs were promoted from the 2019 Thai League 4

- Pattani
- Pathumthani University

==== Relegated clubs ====
A club was relegated to the 2020 Thai League 4 Bangkok Metropolitan Region

- Royal Thai Army

A club was relegated to the 2020 Thai League 4 Southern Region

- Surat Thani

==== Renamed clubs ====
- Banbueng Phuket City was renamed to Banbueng

== Teams ==
=== Stadium and locations ===
Locations of the Thai League 3 Upper region in 2020
2020 Thai League 3 Lower Region
Football clubs in Bangkok Metropolitan Region

Team	Location	Stadium	Capacity
Banbueng	Chonburi	IPE Chonburi Stadium	11,100
Bangkok	Rangsit	Bangkok University Stadium	1,000
BTU United	Bangkok	Bangkok-Thonburi University Stadium	1,500
Kasem Bundit University	Bangkok	Kasem Bundit University Stadium, Rom Klao	2,000
Krabi	Krabi	Krabi Provincial Stadium	8,000
Nakhon Si United	Nakhon Si Thammarat	Nakhon Si Thammarat PAO. Stadium	10,000
Nara United	Narathiwat	Narathiwat PAO. Stadium	5,000
North Bangkok University	Pathum Thani	North Bangkok University Stadium (Rangsit)	3,000
Pathumthani University	Ayutthaya	Ratchakram Stadium	1,000
Pattani	Pattani	Pattani Province Stadium	12,000
Rajpracha	Bangkok	Thonburi Stadium	5,000
Trang	Trang	Trang Municipality Stadium	5,000

=== Foreign Players ===
Club	Player 1	Player 2	Player 3	Asian Player
Banbueng	(Cambodia) Berlin	(Trinidad and Tobago) Seon Power		
Bangkok	(France) Charles Houla	(New Zealand) Kayne Vincent	(New Zealand) Keegan Linderboom	
BTU United	(Ivory Coast) Dicko Ibrahim Abou	(Cameroon) Lionel Frank Touko Nzola	(Madagascar) Ratsimbazafy Heritiana Thierry	(Japan) Kii Hiromu
Kasem Bundit University	(South Korea) Choi Hyung Jun	(South Korea) Hwang Soo-young	(South Korea) Jin Chul Bak	(Japan) Tetsuro Inoue
Krabi	(Ivory Coast) Koné Seydou	(Togo) Ekue Andre Houma	(Nigeria) Efe Obode	(Japan) Ryohei Maeda
Nakhon Si United	(Brazil) Gustavo Silva	(Ghana) Samuel Abega Ampofo	(Brazil) Lucas Marques da Silva	(Tajikistan) Shavkati Hotam
Nara United	(Egypt) Mahmoud Sayed Amer	(Nigeria) Julius Chukwuma Ononiwu	(Madagascar) Guy Hubert	
North Bangkok University	(Egypt) Ahmed Essam Lotfy Elazab	(Brazil) Cláudio	(Germany) Arnold Suew	(South Korea) Kim Sehun
Pathumthani University	(Brazil) Phillerson Natan Silva de Oliveira	(Ivory Coast) Soumahoro Mafa Ivoirienne	(Cameroon) Elvis Job	(Japan) Yusaku Yamadera
Pattani	(Brazil) Thales Cruz Campos	(Brazil) Vitor Marcelo Alves Alcantara	(Togo) Vincent Bossou	(Laos) Mitsada Saitaifah
Rajpracha	(Nigeria) Onyemelukwe Okechukwu Eric	(Germany) George Kelbel		(Japan) Yuki Nohara
Trang	(Brazil) Fabricio Peris Carneiro	(Brazil) Victor Amaro	(Brazil) Felipe Wallace Do Nascimento	(Japan) Mitsuhiro Seki

== League table ==
=== Standings ===
Pos	Team	Pld	W	D	L	GF	GA	GD	Pts	Qualification or relegation
1	Bangkok	2	2	0	0	6	1	+5	6	Qualification to final and promotion to 2021 Thai League 2
2	North Bangkok University	2	1	1	0	2	0	+2	4	Qualification to third place play-offs
3	Pattani	2	1	1	0	4	3	+1	4	
4	Pathumthani University	2	1	1	0	2	1	+1	4	
5	Trang	2	1	1	0	2	1	+1	4	
6	Kasem Bundit University	2	1	0	1	5	3	+2	3	
7	Rajpracha	2	1	0	1	2	2	0	3	
8	Nakhon Si United	2	0	1	1	1	2	−1	1	
9	Krabi	2	0	1	1	1	2	−1	1	
10	Nara United	2	0	1	1	0	1	−1	1	
11	BTU United	2	0	1	1	2	4	−2	1	Relegation to the 2021 Thai League 4
12	Banbueng	2	0	0	2	1	8	−7	0	Relegation to the 2021 Thai League 4

Updated to match(es) played on 1 March 2020. Source: Thai League
Rules for classification: 1) Points; 2) Head-to-head points; 3) Head-to-head goal difference; 4) Head-to-head goal scored; 5) Overall goal difference; 6) Overall goal scored; 7) Fair play points; 8) Play-off without extra time).

=== Positions by round ===
Leader and promotion to the 2021 Thai League 2
Qualification for third place play-offs
Relegation to the 2021 Thai League 4

Team ╲ Round	1	2	3	4	5	6	7	8	9	10	11	12	13	14	15	16	17	18	19	20	21	22
Banbueng	12	12																				
Bangkok	2	1																				
BTU United	4	11																				
Kasem Bundit University	1	6																				
Krabi	10	9																				
Nakhon Si United	6	8																				
Nara United	11	10																				
North Bangkok University	7	2																				
Pathumthani University	8	4																				
Pattani	5	3																				
Rajpracha	3	7																				
Trang	9	5																				

Source: Thai League

=== Results by round ===
Team ╲ Round	1	2	3	4	5	6	7	8	9	10	11	12	13	14	15	16	17	18	19	20	21	22
Banbueng	L	L																				
Bangkok	W	W																				
BTU United	D	L																				
Kasem Bundit University	W	L																				
Krabi	L	D																				
Nakhon Si United	D	L																				
Nara United	L	D																				
North Bangkok University	D	W																				
Pathumthani University	D	W																				
Pattani	D	W																				
Rajpracha	W	L																				
Trang	D	W																				

W = Won; D = Drawn; L = Lost

== Results ==
Home \ Away	BBG	BKK	BTU	KBU	KBI	NSU	NRU	NBU	PTU	PTN	RAJ	TRG
Banbueng	—			1–4								
Bangkok	4–0	—										
BTU United			—							2–2		
Kasem Bundit University				—								1–2
Krabi		1–2			—							
Nakhon Si United						—						
Nara United					0–0		—					
North Bangkok University			2–0					—				
Pathumthani University								0–0	—			
Pattani						2–1				—		
Rajpracha							1–0		1–2		—	
Trang						0–0						—

Updated to match(es) played on 1 March 2020. Source: Thai League
Legend: Blue = home team win; Yellow = draw; Red = away team win.
For upcoming matches, an "a" indicates there is an article about the rivalry between the two participants.

== Season statistics ==
=== Top scorers ===
As of 1 March 2020.

Rank	Player	Club	Goals
1	(Thailand) Sirichai Lamphuttha	Kasem Bundit University	3
2	(Thailand) Woraphot Somsang	BTU United	2
2	(Thailand) Chakris Tiaiadyo	Pattani	2
2	(Brazil) Thales Cruz Campos	Pattani	2
2	(South Korea) Hwang Soo-young	Kasem Bundit University	2
2	(New Zealand) Keegan Linderboom	Bangkok	2
2	(Thailand) Chaowasit Sapysakunphon	Bangkok	2

=== Hat-tricks ===
Player	For	Against	Result	Date
(Thailand) Sirichai Lamphuttha	Kasem Bundit University	Banbueng	4–1	16 February 2020

== Attendance ==
=== Overall statistics ===
Pos	Team	Total	High	Low	Average	Change
1	Pattani	1,729	1,729		1,729	+124.3%
2	Trang	920	920		920	+41.3%
3	Nara United	800	800		800	+0.5%
4	Kasem Bundit University	420	420		420	+71.4%
5	BTU United	400	400		400	+6.4%
6	Bangkok	385	385		385	+3.5%
7	Rajpracha	364	214	150	182	+21.3%
8	North Bangkok University	350	350		350	+5.4%
9	Krabi	320	320		320	+50.9%
10	Banbueng	190	190		190	−60.3%
11	Pathumthani University	115	115		115	−14.2%
12	Nakhon Si United					NA
	League total	5,993	1,729	150	499	+23.2%

Updated to games played on 1 March 2020
Source: Thai League 3

=== Attendance by home match played ===
Team \ Match played	1	2	3	4	5	6	7	8	9	10	11	Total
Banbueng	190											190
Bangkok	385											385
BTU United	400											400
Kasem Bundit University	420											420
Krabi	320											320
Nakhon Si United												
Nara United	800											800
North Bangkok University	350											350
Pathumthani University	115											115
Pattani	1,729											1,729
Rajpracha	214	150										364
Trang	920											920

Source: Thai League 3
