= Annil Vigneswaran =

Malaysian footballer

Personal information
- Date of birth: 25 August 2003 (age 23)
- Place of birth: Kajang, Selangor, Malaysia
- Height: 1.86 m (6 ft 1 in)
- Positions: Centre-back; defensive midfielder

Team information
- Current team: Nakhon Si United
- Number: 6

Youth career
- 2013–2014: Ajax
- 2017–2022: SGV Freiberg
- 2022: SV Sandhausen

Senior career*
| Years | Team | Apps | (Gls) |
| 2022–2023 | Freiburger FC II | 7 | (0) |
| 2023–2024 | Wardhof Mannheim ll | 0 | (0) |
| 2025– | Nakhon Si United | 8 | (0) |

International career
| 2021– | Malaysia U23 | 4 | (0) |
- * Club domestic league appearances and goals

Annil Vigneswaran (born 25 August 2003) is a Malaysian professional footballer who plays as a defender for Thai League 2 club Nakhon Si United.

== Club career ==
=== Early life ===
Born in Kajang, Selangor, Annil first took an interest in football at the age of seven, with his father enrolling him in a Little League side, for players aged 5–16 across the Klang Valley. At the age of ten, he spent one year with Dutch side Ajax, before returning to Malaysia to join the Kuala Lumpur Youth Soccer (KLYS) team.

=== Move to Germany ===
At the age of fourteen, Annil was scouted by German side SGV Freiberg, and eventually moved to Germany to join the club. In February 2022, he joined 2. Bundesliga side SV Sandhausen.

For the 2022–23 season, he joined Oberliga Baden-Württemberg side Freiburger FC, but was assigned to the club's second team in the Landesliga Südbaden 2.

== International career ==
In October 2021, he received a surprise call up to the Malaysia national under-23 football team, having not attended any of the training camps in Malaysia. This call up was criticised by fans, with then-coach Brad Maloney coming to Vigneswaran's defence, saying "assistant coach, Khan Hung Meng used to train this player before he went to Germany a few years ago and he was seen as a very talented player and since then, his performance has started to be monitored."
