= Watchara Buathong =

Thai professional footballer

Personal information
- Full name: Watchara Buathong
- Date of birth: 20 April 1993 (age 33)
- Place of birth: Songkhla, Thailand
- Height: 1.86 m (6 ft 1 in)
- Position: Goalkeeper

Team information
- Current team: Nakhon Pathom United
- Number: 59

Youth career
- 2008–2009: Osotspa

Senior career*
Years	Team	Apps	(Gls)
2010–2015	Osotspa Samut Prakan	3	(0)
2012	→ Chainat Hornbill (loan)	5	(0)
2012	→ Thai Port (loan)	12	(0)
2014	→ Bangkok (loan)	0	(0)
2014	→ Samutsongkhram (loan)	14	(0)
2016–2022	Port	14	(0)
2016–2017	→ BBCU (loan)	22	(0)
2022	→ Trat (loan)	5	(0)
2022–2023	Nakhon Si United	4	(0)
2023–	Nakhon Pathom United	2	(0)

International career
2011–2012	Thailand U19	4	(0)
2012–2016	Thailand U23	2	(0)
- * Club domestic league appearances and goals as of 30 April 2023

Watchara Buathong (Thai: วัชระ บัวทอง, born April 23, 1993) is a Thai professional footballer who plays as a goalkeeper for Thai League 1 Club Nakhon Pathom United.

== Club career ==
The young goalkeeper joined a Thai Premier League club Osotspa Saraburi in 2009 aged 16 and played for the club until 2011.

In 2012, Chainat signed him in a loan deal until the end of the 2012 season.

== International career ==
In 2016 Watchara was selected in Thailand U23 squad for 2016 AFC U-23 Championship in Qatar.

== Honours ==
=== International ===
Thailand U-19

- AFF U-19 Youth Championship
  - Winners (1) : 2011

=== Club ===
Port

- Thai FA Cup (1) : 2019
