= Nantawat Suankaew =

Thai footballer

Personal information
- Date of birth: 8 December 1998 (age 27)
- Place of birth: Krabi, Thailand
- Height: 1.82 m (6 ft 0 in)
- Positions: Forward; winger

Team information
- Current team: Kanchanaburi Power
- Number: 11

Youth career
- 2013–2015: Rajavinit Bangkhen School
- 2015–2016: Bangkok Glass

Senior career*
Years	Team	Apps	(Gls)
2017–2021	BG Pathum United	1	(0)
2018	→ Khon Kaen (loan)	3	(0)
2019	→ Ubon United (loan)	14	(1)
2019	→ Rayong (loan)	20	(2)
2021–2023	Port	1	(0)
2021	→ Nongbua Pitchaya (loan)	2	(0)
2022	→ Customs United (loan)	17	(1)
2022–2023	→ Chiangmai United (loan)	31	(6)
2023–2024	Nakhon Si United	28	(12)
2024–2025	Mahasarakham SBT	26	(5)
2025–2026	Nakhon Si United	18	(7)
2026–	Kanchanaburi Power	0	(0)

International career^{‡}
2016–2017	Thailand U19	2	(0)
2019–2020	Thailand U23	2	(0)
- * Club domestic league appearances and goals as of 7 April 2026 ‡ National team caps and goals as of 11 November 2019

Nantawat Suankaew (Thai: นันทวัฒน์ สวนแก้ว; born 8 December 1998) is a Thai footballer who plays as a forward or a winger for Kanchanaburi Power in Thai League 2.

== International career ==
In 2020, He played the 2020 AFC U-23 Championship with Thailand U23.
