= Kannarin Thawornsak =

Thai footballer

Personal information
- Full name: Kannarin Thawornsak
- Date of birth: 27 May 1997 (age 29)
- Place of birth: Ratchaburi, Thailand
- Height: 1.80 m (5 ft 11 in)
- Position: Defensive midfielder

Team information
- Current team: PT Prachuap
- Number: 23

Youth career
- 2012–2014: Bangkok Christian College

Senior career*
Years	Team	Apps	(Gls)
2014	BEC Tero Sasana	0	(0)
2015	→ BCC (loan)	16	(4)
2016–2019	Ratchaburi Mitr Phol	5	(1)
2017	→ Sisaket (loan)	14	(1)
2018	→ Suphanburi (loan)	6	(0)
2019	→ Sisaket (loan)	31	(3)
2020–2022	Port	31	(0)
2022	→ Customs United (loan)	8	(0)
2022–2024	Muangthong United	31	(1)
2024–	PT Prachuap	51	(0)

International career^{‡}
2015–2016	Thailand U19	4	(0)
2017–2018	Thailand U21	4	(0)
2018–2020	Thailand U23	6	(0)
- * Club domestic league appearances and goals as of 02:16, 22 June 2026 (UTC) ‡ National team caps and goals as of 14 January 2020

Kannarin Thawornsak (Thai: กานต์นรินทร์ ถาวรศักดิ์; born 27 May 1997) is a Thai professional footballer who plays as a defensive midfielder for Thai League 1 club PT Prachuap.

== International career ==
In 2020, He played the 2020 AFC U-23 Championship with Thailand U23.

== Honours ==
Thailand U-19

- AFF U-19 Youth Championship: 2015
