= Thitathorn Aksornsri =

Thai footballer (born 1997)

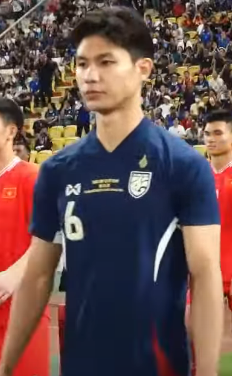
- Thitathorn in 2025

Personal information
- Full name: Thitathorn Aksornsri
- Date of birth: 8 November 1997 (age 29)
- Place of birth: Bangkok, Thailand
- Height: 1.84 m (6 ft 1/2 in)
- Position: Left back

Team information
- Current team: Uthai Thani
- Number: 65

Youth career
- 2013–2016: BEC Tero Sasana

Senior career*
Years	Team	Apps	(Gls)
2017–2020	Police Tero	31	(1)
2017	→ Dome (loan)	16	(1)
2020–2024	Port	15	(0)
2022	→ PT Prachuap (loan)	9	(0)
2024	→ Trat (loan)	13	(1)
2024–	Uthai Thani	22	(2)

International career^{‡}
2019–2020	Thailand U23	7	(0)
2024–	Thailand	8	(0)
Medal record
Thailand
ASEAN Championship
Runner-up	Mitsubishi Electric Cup 2024	Team
- * Club domestic league appearances and goals as of 01:45, 18 March 2025 (UTC) ‡ National team caps and goals as of 5 January 2025

Thitathorn Aksornsri (Thai: ทิตาธร อักษรศรี; born 8 November 1997) is a Thai professional footballer who plays as a left back for Thai League 1 club Uthai Thani and the Thailand national team.

== International career ==
In September 2019, Thitathorn was called up to the Thailand U23 for the SEA Games. In January 2020, He played the 2020 AFC U-23 Championship with Thailand U23.

On 14 November 2024, Thitathorn made his Thailand national team debut in a friendly match against Lebanon. He was selected in the Thailand squad for the 2024 ASEAN Championship.

== Personal life ==
Thitathorn's twin younger brother Thitawee, who is also a footballer and plays as a right back. His older brother, Tatpicha Aksornsri, is also a footballer and plays as a goalkeeper.
