= Yossawat Montha =

Thai footballer (born 1995)

Personal information
- Full name: Yossawat Montha
- Date of birth: 11 November 1995 (age 31)
- Place of birth: Yasothon, Thailand
- Height: 1.70 m (5 ft 7 in)
- Position: Left-back

Team information
- Current team: Nakhon Si United
- Number: 32

Youth career
- 2012: Police United

Senior career*
Years	Team	Apps	(Gls)
2013–2015	Police United	12	(0)
2013	→ Look Isan (loan)	8	(0)
2014	→ Nonthaburi (loan)	14	(0)
2016	Nakhon Pathom United	21	(2)
2016–2017	Buriram United	3	(0)
2017–2022	Port	5	(0)
2018	→ Ubon UMT United (loan)	9	(0)
2018	→ PT Prachuap (loan)	0	(0)
2019	→ Nongbua Pitchaya (loan)	15	(1)
2020–2022	→ Songkhla (loan)	37	(4)
2022–2023	Lampang	6	(0)
2023–2024	Kasetsart	23	(0)
2024–	Nakhon Si United	27	(2)

International career
2016–2018	Thailand U23	1	(0)
- * Club domestic league appearances and goals as of 26 April 2025

Yossawat Montha (Thai: ยศวรรธน์ มนทา, born November 11, 1995) is a Thai professional footballer who plays as a left-back for Thai League 2 club Nakhon Si United.
