= Thitawee Aksornsri =

Thai footballer (born 1997)

Personal information
- Full name: Thitawee Aksornsri
- Date of birth: 8 November 1997 (age 29)
- Place of birth: Bangkok, Thailand
- Height: 1.84 m (6 ft 1/2 in)
- Positions: Centre back; right back

Team information
- Current team: Bangkok
- Number: 65

Youth career
- 2013–2016: BEC Tero Sasana

Senior career*
Years	Team	Apps	(Gls)
2017–2020	Police Tero	15	(0)
2020–2024	Port	6	(0)
2022	→ PT Prachuap (loan)	10	(0)
2023–2024	→ Trat (loan)	25	(0)
2024–2025	Nakhon Pathom United	20	(1)
2025–	Uthai Thani	0	(0)
2025	→ Chainat Hornbill (loan)	2	(0)
2026–	→ Bangkok (loan)	7	(0)

International career^{‡}
2018	Thailand U21	3	(0)
2020	Thailand U23	2	(0)
- * Club domestic league appearances and goals as of 03:05, 6 November 2024 (UTC) ‡ National team caps and goals as of 05:22, 9 June 2022 (UTC)

Thitawee Aksornsri (Thai: ทิตาวีร์ อักษรศรี, born 8 November 1997) is a Thai professional footballer who plays as a centre back, he has also been used as a right back for Thai League 2 club Bangkok.

== International career ==
In January 2020, Thitawee played the 2020 AFC U-23 Championship with Thailand U23.

== Personal life ==
Thitawee's twin older brother Thitathorn, who is also a footballer and plays as a left back. His older brother, Tatpicha Aksornsri, is also a footballer and plays as a goalkeeper.
