= PAT Stadium =

Sports venue in Bangkok, Thailand

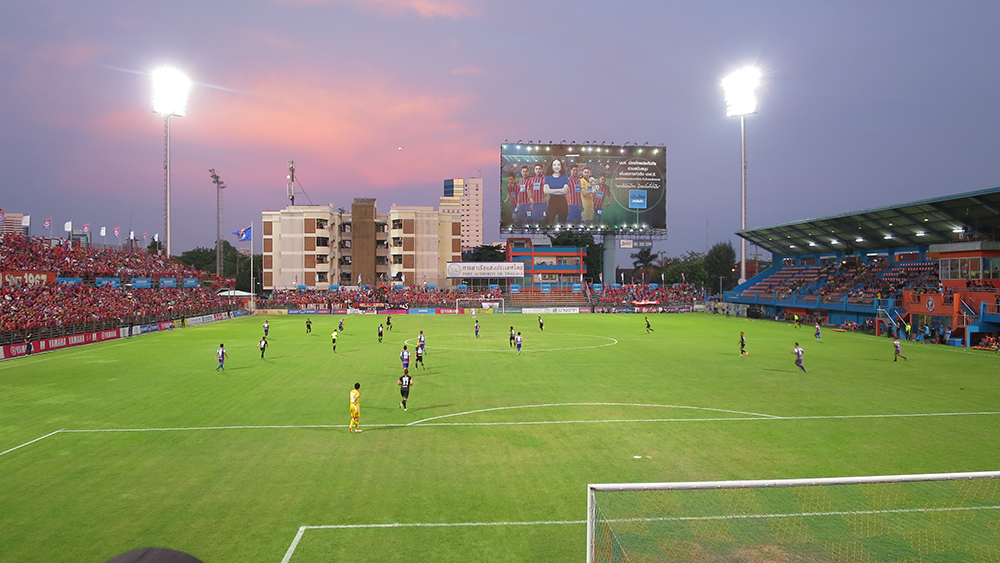
- The stadium on a matchday
- Interactive map of PAT Stadium
- Full name: Port Authority of Thailand Stadium
- Former names: Tha Ruea Stadium
- Location: Khlong Toei, Bangkok, Thailand
- Coordinates: 13°42′54″N 100°33′35″E
- Owner: Port Authority of Thailand
- Operator: Port F.C.
- Capacity: 6,250
- Surface: Grass
- Record attendance: 6,916 (Port vs Buriram PEA, 25 September 2011)
- Public transit: MRT Queen Sirikit National Convention Centre

Construction
- Opened: 1967
- Expanded: 2011

Tenant
- Port F.C. (2009–present)

Port Authority of Thailand Stadium, simply known as PAT Stadium (Thai: แพท สเตเดียม) is a stadium in the Khlong Toei District of central Bangkok, Thailand. It is currently used for football matches and is the home stadium of Port.

The stadium holds approximately 6,000 spectators divided into four stands labelled A to D and is the subject of a popular chant by Port fans: "This is Khlong Toei - this is the away team's hell".

== History ==
Located in Khlong Toei District, the stadium was completed in 1967 and underwent three renovations, in 2009, 2011 and 2020.

== Gallery ==
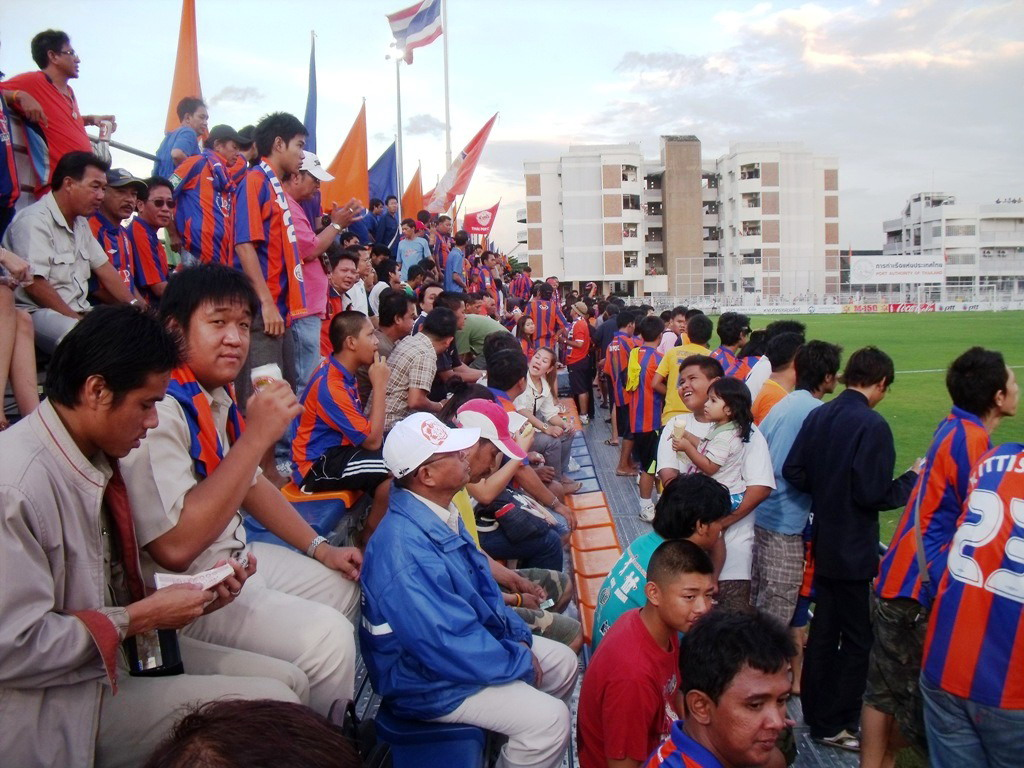

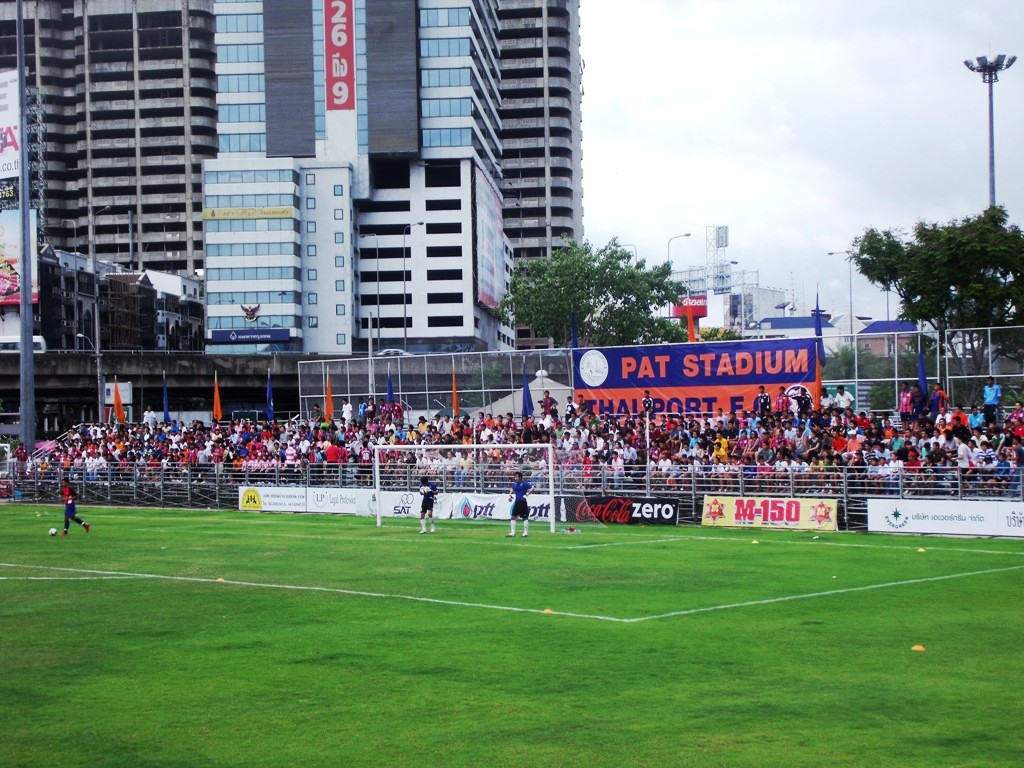

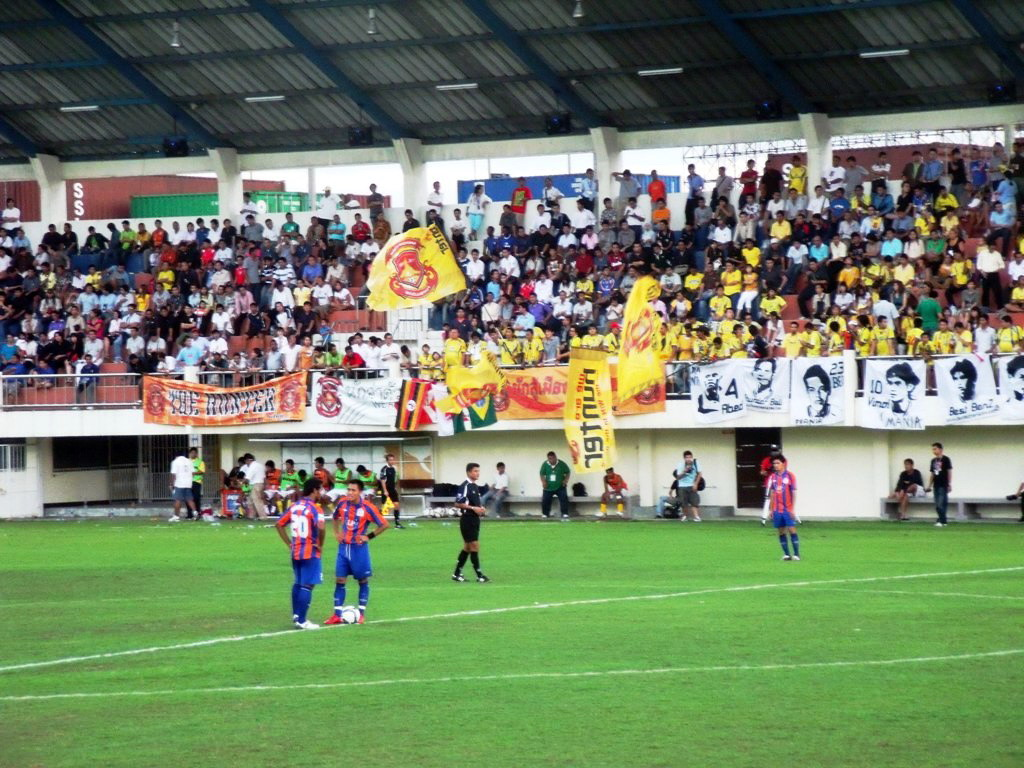

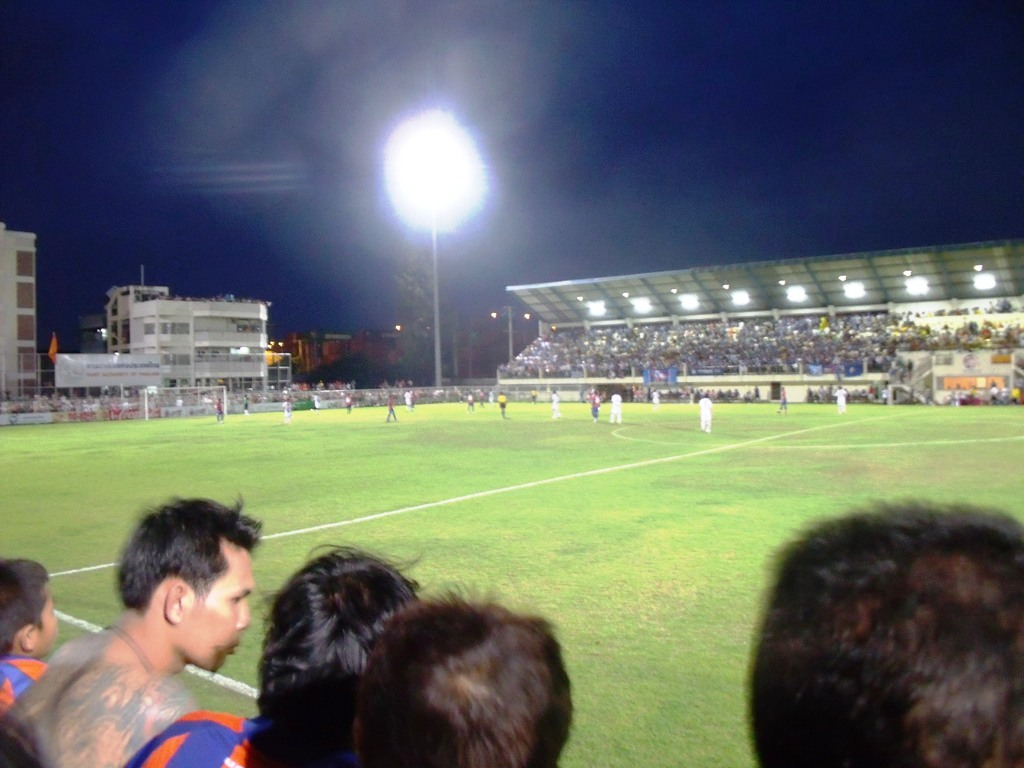

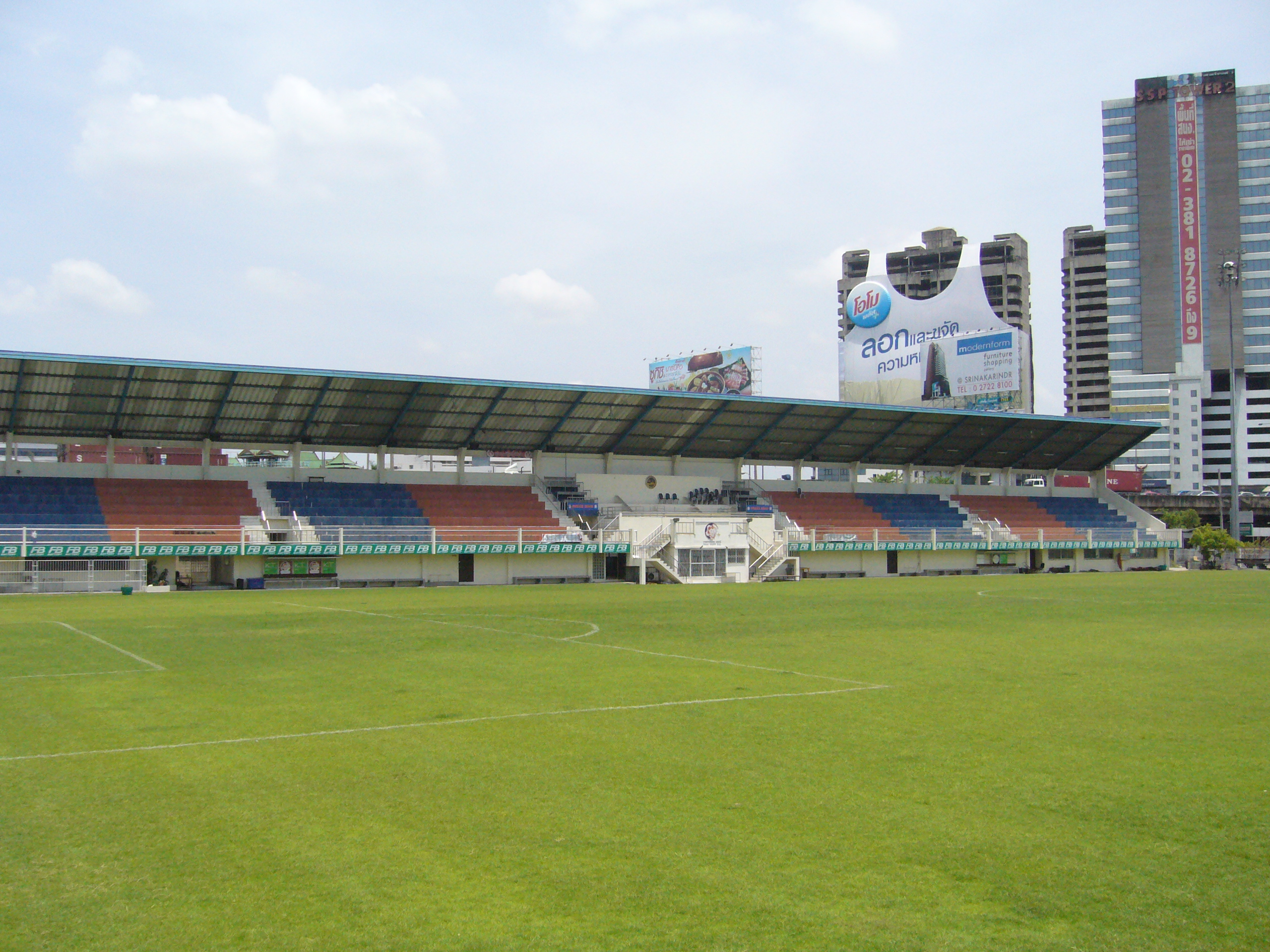

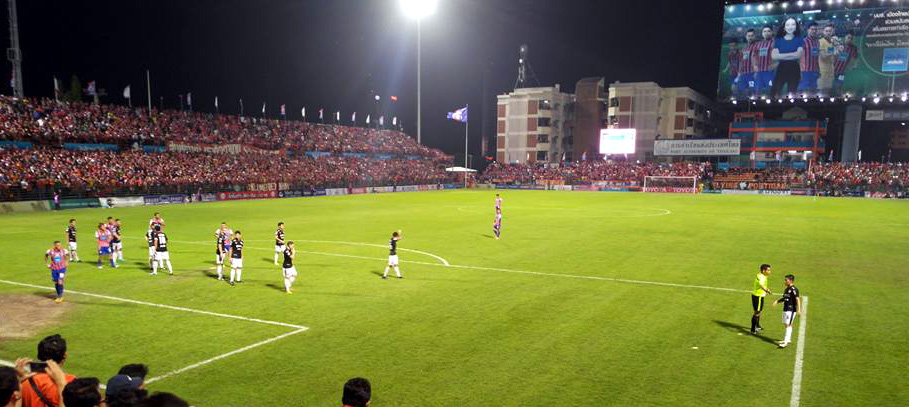
