= Tanasith Siripala =

Thai footballer (born 1995)

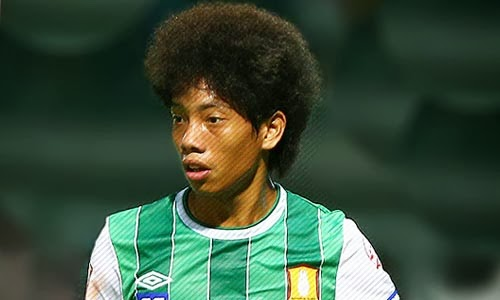

Personal information
- Full name: Tanasith Siripala
- Date of birth: 9 August 1995 (age 31)
- Place of birth: Ubon Ratchathani, Thailand
- Height: 1.70 m (5 ft 7 in)
- Position: Winger

Team information
- Current team: BG Pathum United
- Number: 39

Youth career
- 2010–2011: Bangkok Glass

Senior career*
Years	Team	Apps	(Gls)
2012–2016	Bangkok Glass	59	(5)
2012	→ Rangsit (loan)	5	(3)
2016–2019	Suphanburi	77	(6)
2020–2026	Port	62	(3)
2023	→ Prachuap (loan)	14	(3)
2025–2026	→ Kanchanaburi Power (loan)	7	(0)
2026–	BG Pathum United	0	(0)

International career^{‡}
2012–2014	Thailand U19	5	(1)
2016	Thailand U21	2	(0)
2015–2018	Thailand U23	16	(5)
Medal record
Thailand under-21
Nations Cup
Winner	Nations Cup 2016	Football
- * Club domestic league appearances and goals as of 2 February 2025 ‡ National team caps and goals as of 19 August 2018

Tanasith Siripala (Thai: ธนาสิทธิ์ ศิริผลา; born 9 August 1995), simply known as Tao (Thai: เต๋า), is a Thai professional footballer who plays as a winger for Thai League 1 club BG Pathum United.

Tanasith is affectionately dubbed "Taodinho" by Thai supporters for his resemblance to the Brazilian star Ronaldinho.

== Early life ==
Thanasit was born in Khemarat District, Ubon Ratchathani, Thailand. He regularly played football as a child, and moved to Bangkok for studied and played football at Pensmith School. In this school he played in tournament Asian schools football U-15 championship 2010 at indonesia

== Club career ==
=== Bangkok Glass ===
Tanasith has signed for Bangkok Glass as a trainee in 2010 and played for a youth team. He began his professional career in 2012 at the age of 16, Tanasith was being loaned out by the club in same year to Rangsit to gain experience and toughen up in Khǒr Royal Cup. He made his professional football debut on 9 January 2012 in 1–1 draw against Dhurakij Pundit University.

on 13 January 2012 Tanasith scored his first goal In 1–0 win over Army Welfare Department at Rangsit. he played 5 games and scored 3 goals, helping the club gain promotion to Regional League Division 2 (Bangkok & Field Region) as Khǒr Royal Cup champion.

Tanasith returned to Bangkok Glass in 2012 Thai Premier League and finally made his league debut for Bangkok Glass on 7 April 2012, in a 2–0 win over Police United at Leo Stadium. He played 9 games for Bangkok Glass in the league that season and they finished eighth.

In 2013 season at the age of 17, he made his first goal for Bangkok Glass on 28 September 2013 in Thai Premier League 5–1 win over TOT

== International career ==
In 2016 Tanasith was selected in Thailand U23 squad for 2016 AFC U-23 Championship in Qatar.

== International goals ==
=== Under-19 ===
#	Date	Venue	Opponent	Score	Result	Competition
1.	9 October 2014	Thuwunna Stadium, Myanmar	Iran	1–1	2–1	2014 AFC U-19 Championship

=== Under-23 ===
#	Date	Venue	Opponent	Score	Result	Competition
1.	March 4, 2015	Nakhon Pathom Municipality Sport School Stadium, Thailand	Chinese Taipei	2–0	2–1	Friendly
2.	March 23, 2017	UAE Football Association Stadium, UAE	Malaysia	4–0	4–0	2017 Dubai Cup
3.	March 26, 2017	Police Officers' Club Stadium, UAE	China	1–2	1–2	2017 Dubai Cup
4.	31 May 2018	PTIK Stadium, Jakarta, Indonesia	Indonesia	1–2	1–2	Friendly
5.	10 August 2018	Thammasat Stadium, Pathum Thani, Thailand	Nepal	4–0	4–0	Friendly

== Honours ==
=== Clubs ===
Bangkok Glass

- Thai FA Cup (1): 2014

==== Port ====
- Piala Presiden: 2025

=== International ===
Thailand U-23

- Dubai Cup (1): 2017
- BIDC Cup (Cambodia) (1): 2013

Thailand U-21

- Nations Cup (1): 2016
