= Chanayut Jejue =

Thai footballer

Personal information
- Full name: Chanayut Jejue
- Date of birth: 23 February 1999 (age 27)
- Place of birth: Bangkok, Thailand
- Position: Midfielder

Team information
- Current team: Angthong
- Number: 23

Youth career
- 2010–2012: Muangthong United
- 2013–2016: Assumption College Sriracha
- 2017–2018: Port

Senior career*
| Years | Team | Apps | (Gls) |
| 2019–2021 | Port | 1 | (0) |
| 2020–2021 | → Ayutthaya United (loan) | 6 | (0) |
| 2021 | → Muang Loei United (loan) | 10 | (2) |
| 2021–2022 | → Sisaket (loan) | 11 | (2) |
| 2022 | Krabi | 1 | (0) |
| 2023–2024 | Ranong United | 8 | (2) |
| 2024 | VRN Muangnont | 8 | (2) |
| 2025 | Muang Trang United | 8 | (0) |
| 2025 | Singburi Warriors | 10 | (1) |
| 2026– | Angthong | 0 | (0) |
- * Club domestic league appearances and goals as of 22 March 2026

Chanayut Jejue (Thai: ชนายุทธ เจจือ; born 2 February 1999) is a Thai professional footballer who plays as a midfielder for Angthong.
