= Meechok Marhasaranukun =

Thai footballer

Personal information
- Full name: Meechok Marhasaranukun
- Date of birth: 12 December 1997 (age 28)
- Place of birth: Bangkok, Thailand
- Height: 1.80 m (5 ft 11 in)
- Position: Right back

Team information
- Current team: Suphanburi
- Number: 20

Youth career
- 2010–2012: Bangkok Christian College

Senior career*
Years	Team	Apps	(Gls)
2013–2014	Looktabfah	26	(1)
2015	TOT	20	(0)
2016–2018	Port	28	(0)
2018–2020	Suphanburi	29	(3)
2021–2023	Port	0	(0)
2021–2022	→ Customs United (loan)	6	(0)
2022–2023	→ Lampang (loan)	13	(0)
2023–2024	Lampang	33	(0)
2024–2025	Pattaya United	29	(1)
2025–2026	Navy	19	(1)
2026–	Suphanburi	0	(0)

International career^{‡}
2015–2016	Thailand U19	10	(0)
2017–2018	Thailand U21	4	(0)
2018–2020	Thailand U23	4	(0)
- * Club domestic league appearances and goals as of 26 April 2025 ‡ National team caps and goals as of 18 January 2020

Meechok Marhasaranukun (Thai: มีโชค มหาศรานุกุล) is a Thai professional footballer who plays for Thai League 3 club Suphanburi as a right back.

== International career ==
He won the 2015 AFF U-19 Youth Championship with Thailand U19. In 2020, He played the 2020 AFC U-23 Championship with Thailand U23.

== Honours ==
=== International ===
Thailand U-19

- AFF U-19 Youth Championship (1): 2015
