= Nakhon Si United F.C. =

Thai football club

Nakhon Si United นครศรี ยูไนเต็ด
- Full name: Nakhon Si United Football Club สโมสรฟุตบอล นครศรี ยูไนเต็ด
- Nicknames: Southern Dragons (มังกรแดนใต้)
- Short name: NSUFC
- Founded: 2014; 12 years ago, as Rajapruk-Muangnont United Football Club; 2016; 10 years ago, as Rajapruk University Football Club; 2017; 9 years ago, as Nakhon Si Thammarat Unity Football Club; 2018; 8 years ago, as WU-Nakhon Si United Football Club; 2019; 7 years ago, as Nakhon Si United Football Club
- Ground: Nakhon Si Thammarat Province Stadium, Nakhon Si Thammarat
- Capacity: 5,000
- Chairman: Tony Basha
- Head coach: Steven McGarry
- League: Thai League 3
- 2025–26: Thai League 2, 17th of 18 (Relegated)
- Website: www.nakhonsiutd.com
| Home colours | Away colours |

Nakhon Si United Football Club (Thai: สโมสรฟุตบอล นครศรี ยูไนเต็ด) is a Thai professional football club based in Nakhon Si Thammarat province. Founded in 2014 as Rajapruk Muangnont United Football Club, the club is currently playing in the Thai League 3.

== History ==
=== Early years ===
The club was founded in 2014 under the name Ratchaphruek Muangnont United Football Club located in Pak Kret, Nonthaburi. They used Potinimitwittayakom school's stadium to be their ground. Then, during 2014 season, they relocated to Thanyaburi, Pathum Thani and used Queen Sirikit 60th Anniversary Stadium to be their ground. After that, in 2015, season they relocated to Phutthamonthon, Nakhon Pathom and used Rajamangala University of Technology Rattanakosin Salaya campus's stadium to be their ground.

=== 2016, Renaming ===
In 2016, the club's boards have renamed this club to Rajapruk University Football Club. Then, relocated to Nong Khaem, Bangkok and used Thonburi University Stadium to be their ground.

=== 2017, Takeover and merger with Nakhon Si Heritage football club ===
In 2017, this club has taken over by Nakhon Si Heritage's boards and merged it with Nakhon Si Heritage a football club that played in 2016 Regional League Division 2 Southern region. Then, renamed it to Nakhon Si Thammarat Unity Football Club and relocated to Ron Phibun, Nakhon Si Thammarat. They used Nakhon Si Thammarat PAO Stadium to be their ground.

=== 2018, Takeover and merger with Muangkhon United football club ===
In 2018, this club has taken over by Muangkhon United's boards and merged it with Muangkhon United a football club that played in 2017 Thailand Amateur League Southern region. Then, renamed it to WU Nakhon Si United Football Club and relocated to Tha Sala, Nakhon Si Thammarat. They used Walailak University Stadium to be their ground.

=== 2019, End of contract with Walailak University ===
In 2019, this club has end of contract with Walailak University and renamed to Nakhon Si United. For this reason, they have removed the text WU out from their logo in this season.

== Logo ==
Nakhon Si United
2019–present

== Honours ==
- Khǒr Royal Cup (ถ้วย ข.)
  - Runner-up : 2013

== Stadium and locations ==
| Coordinates | Location | Stadium | Year |
|---|---|---|---|
| 13°56′19″N 100°30′42″E | Nonthaburi | Photinimit Witthayakhom Stadium | 2014 |
| 14°01′41″N 100°43′33″E | Pathum Thani | Queen Sirikit 60th Anniversary Stadium | 2014 |
| 13°47′48″N 100°17′53″E | Nakhon Pathom | RMUTR Salaya Stadium | 2015 |
| 13°43′27″N 100°20′42″E | Bangkok | Thonburi University Stadium | 2016 |
| 8°11′55″N 99°52′08″E | Nakhon Si Thammarat | Nakhon Si Thammarat PAO Stadium | 2017 |
| 8°38′59″N 99°52′44″E | Nakhon Si Thammarat | Walailak University Stadium | 2018 |
| 8°11′55″N 99°52′08″E | Nakhon Si Thammarat | Nakhon Si Thammarat PAO Stadium | 2019–present |

== Season by season record ==
| Season | League | | | | | | | | | FA Cup | League Cup | Top goalscorer | |
| Season | Division | P | W | D | L | F | A | Pts | Pos | FA Cup | League Cup | Name | Goals |
Rajapruk-Muangnont United Football Club
| 2014 | DIV2 Central & West | 26 | 10 | 6 | 10 | 40 | 38 | 36 | 7th | Opted out | Opted out | | |
| 2015 | DIV2 Central & West | 24 | 5 | 4 | 15 | 22 | 39 | 19 | 11th | Opted out | R1 | | |
Rajapruk University Football Club
| 2016 | DIV2 West | 22 | 12 | 4 | 6 | 38 | 22 | 40 | 3rd | Opted out | Opted out | | |
Nakhon Si Thammarat Unity Football Club
| 2017 | T3 Lower | 28 | 9 | 11 | 8 | 25 | 30 | 38 | 8th | R1 | Opted out | (Nigeria) Emmanuel Nwachi | 6 |
WU-Nakhon Si United Football Club
| 2018 | T3 Lower | 26 | 9 | 7 | 10 | 31 | 31 | 34 | 8th | Opted out | Opted out | (Japan) Daiki Konomura | 15 |
Nakhon Si United Football Club
| 2019 | T3 Lower | 26 | 8 | 8 | 10 | 29 | 38 | 32 | 10th | R3 | QR1 | (Ghana) Ampofo Samulabega | 7 |
| 2020–21 | T3 South | 16 | 9 | 2 | 5 | 30 | 17 | 29 | 4th | Opted out | QR2 | (Thailand) Issarapong Lilakorn | 7 |
| 2021–22 | T3 South | 24 | 15 | 7 | 2 | 47 | 19 | 52 | 2nd | QR | R1 | (Brazil) Erivelto | 12 |
| 2022–23 | T2 | 34 | 14 | 9 | 11 | 48 | 42 | 51 | 8th | R1 | QR2 | (Brazil) Evandro Paulista | 12 |
| 2023–24 | T2 | 34 | 16 | 11 | 7 | 60 | 40 | 59 | 5th | R1 | R1 | (Brazil) Rodrigo Maranhão | 15 |
| 2024–25 | T2 | 32 | 13 | 5 | 14 | 51 | 52 | 44 | 9th | R3 | QPR | (Brazil) Rodrigo Maranhão | 22 |
| 2025–26 | T2 | 34 | 8 | 12 | 14 | 32 | 54 | 36 | 17th | QR | QRP | (Thailand) Nanthawat Suankaeo | 7 |

| Champions | Runners-up | Promoted | Relegated |

- P = Played
- W = Games won
- D = Games drawn
- L = Games lost
- F = Goals for
- A = Goals against
- Pts = Points
- Pos = Final position
- QR1 = First Qualifying Round
- QR2 = Second Qualifying Round
- R1 = Round 1
- R2 = Round 2
- R3 = Round 3
- R4 = Round 4
- R5 = Round 5
- R6 = Round 6
- QF = Quarter-finals
- SF = Semi-finals
- RU = Runners-up
- W = Winners

== Players ==
=== Current squad ===
As of 29 June 2026

Note: Flags indicate national team as defined under FIFA eligibility rules; some limited exceptions apply. Players may hold more than one non-FIFA nationality.

| No. | Pos. | Nation | Player |
|---|---|---|---|
| 5 | DF | THA | Nattawut Salae |
| 6 | DF | MAS | Annil Vigneswaran |
| 7 | FW | THA | Nantawat Suankaew |
| 9 | FW | AUS | Benjamin Dylan Bruckner |
| 10 | FW | AUS | Dylan Ruiz-Diaz |
| 13 | GK | THA | Anusit Termmee |
| 14 | MF | THA | Ronnayod Mingmitwan |
| 18 | DF | THA | Adisak Sensom-Eiad (captain) |
| 19 | FW | THA | Kritsada Sriwanit |
| 21 | FW | EGY | Mohamed Essam |
| 22 | MF | THA | Nawamin Chaiprasert |

| No. | Pos. | Nation | Player |
|---|---|---|---|
| 23 | DF | THA | Thanachai Nathanakool (on loan from Chonburi) |
| 24 | DF | THA | Niras Bu-nga |
| 26 | GK | THA | Rattanachat Neamthaisong (on loan from BG Pathum United) |
| 27 | DF | THA | Krissana Nontharak |
| 31 | MF | THA | Wanchalerm Yingyong |
| 32 | DF | THA | Yossawat Montha |
| 39 | DF | THA | Akarawit Saemarum |
| 43 | GK | THA | Putthipong Promlee |
| 59 | GK | THA | Teerapong Puttasukha |
| 88 | FW | AUS | Mustafa Amini |
| 91 | FW | THA | Nattapoom Maya |
| 98 | MF | THA | Siwarut Pholhirun |
| — | DF | TRI | Sheldon Bateau |
| — | MF | THA | Yannick Nussbaum |
| — | FW | BRA | Jean Carlos Cloth Goncalves |
| — | FW | BRA | Cristhyan |

== Coaching staff ==
| Position | Name |
|---|---|
| Sporting director and club president | (Thailand) (England) Sam Percival |
| Head coach | (Scotland) Steven McGarry |
| Assistant coach | (Thailand) Alongkorn Thong-am (Thailand) Ekalak Thong-am |
| Goalkeeping coach | (Thailand) Teerapong Puttasukha |
| Fitness coach | (Thailand) Techin Boonmee |
| Analyst | (Thailand) Pongthep Kalasee |
| Physiotherapist | (Thailand) Paradorn Suwapong |
| Kitman | (Thailand) Rewat Prachayawanit |
| Team manager | (Thailand) Tadthep Boriboon |

== Coaches ==
| Name | Country | Period | Honours |
|---|---|---|---|
| Wirach Khaeyiwa | (Thailand) | 2016–2017 | |
| Pongsathorn Bunsing | (Thailand) | 2017–2019 | |
| Choketawee Promrut | (Thailand) | 2020–2021 | |
| Aktaporn Chalitaporn | (Thailand) | 2021 | |
| Jörg Steinebrunner | (Germany) | 2022, 2025–2026 | Runner-up 2021–22 Thai League 3 Southern Region, Third place 2021–22 Thai League 3 |
| Wanderley Junior | (Brazil) | 2022–2023 | |
| Worrawoot Srimaka | (Thailand) | 2023 | |
| Harnarong Chunhakunakorn | (Thailand) | 2023–2024 | |
| Thongchai Sukkoki | (Thailand) | 2024 | |
| Sarawut Wongmai | (Thailand) | 2024–2025 | |
| Oriol Mohedano | (Spain) | 2025 | |
| Steven McGarry | (Scotland) | 2026– | |
