= 2017 Sukhothai F.C. season =

Sukhothai
2017 season
- Chairman: Somsak Thepsutin
- Head Coach: Somchai Makmul
- Stadium: Thung Thalay Luang Stadium, Mueang Sukhothai, Sukhothai, Thailand
- Thai League T1: 15th
- Thai FA Cup: Round of 32
- Thai League Cup: Quarter-finals
- Thailand Champions Cup: Runners-up
- AFC Champions League: Play-off round
- Top goalscorer: League: John Baggio (9); All: John Baggio (9)

The 2017 season is Sukhothai's 2nd season in the Thai League T1 since 2016.

== Thailand Champions Cup ==
The 2017 Thailand Champions Cup. It features SCG Muangthong United, the winners of the 2016 Thai League, and Sukhothai, the winners of the 2016 Thai FA Cup. It was played at Supachalasai Stadium.

Date	Opponents	H / A	Result F–A	Scorer(s)
22 January 2017	SCG Muangthong United	N	0–5	

== Thai League ==
Date	Opponents	H / A	Result F–A	Scorers	League position
12 February 2017	Nakhon Ratchasima Mazda	H	0–1		14th
17 February 2017	SCG Muangthong United	A	0–1		17th
25 February 2017	Super Power Samut Prakan	H	5–1	Baggio (2) 9', 73', Anton (2) 61' (pen.), 66', Watcharapon 71'	10th
4 March 2017	Sisaket	A	1–3	Baggio 82'	11th
8 March 2017	Ratchaburi Mitr Phol	H	0–3		16th
12 March 2017	Suphanburi	H	2–3	Adrović 47', Baggio 68'	16th
3 April 2017	Bangkok United	A	2–4	Diouf (2) 55', 65'	16th
8 April 2017	Navy	H	1–1	Adrović 2'	16th
19 April 2017	Thai Honda Ladkrabang	A	1–0	Piyarat 80'	16th
23 April 2017	Port	H	2–3	Lursan 81', Adrović 85' (pen.)	16th
29 April 2017	Ubon UMT United	A	1–2	Kabfah 65'	16th
3 May 2017	Chiangrai United	H	2–2	Adrović 52', Kongnathichai 63'	16th
7 May 2017	Bangkok Glass	A	2–2	Adrović 30', Diouf 83'	15th
13 May 2017	Buriram United	H	1–3	Kabfah 70'	16th
21 May 2017	Chonburi	A	2–3	Diouf 2', Adrović 76'	17th
28 May 2017	Pattaya United	H	2–0	Adrović 55', Diouf 78'	17th
1 June 2017	BEC Tero Sasana	H	2–0	Diouf (2) 57', 84'	15th
18 June 2017	SCG Muangthong United	H	2–2	Katano (2) 74', 86' (pen.)	15th
25 June 2017	Super Power Samut Prakan	A	4–0	Kongnathichai 47', Baggio 73', Nuttawut 74', Piyapong 90+2' (pen.)	14th
28 June 2017	Sisaket	H	2–1	Maranhão 45+2', Baggio 72'	14th
1 July 2017	Ratchaburi Mitr Phol	A	1–1	Kongnathichai 81'	13th
5 July 2017	Suphanburi	A	1–1	Baggio 9'	14th
8 July 2017	Bangkok United	H	1–4	Baggio 20'	15th
30 July 2017	Navy	A	1–3	Maranhão 8'	15th
6 August 2017	Thai Honda Ladkrabang	H	1–0	Kongnathichai 13'	15th
10 September 2017	Port	A	3–3	Kongnathichai 4', Baggio 82', Maranhão 90' (pen.)	15th
16 September 2017	Ubon UMT United	H	3–3	Kabfah (3) 4', 54', 62'	15th
20 September 2017	Chiangrai United	A	0–6		15th
23 September 2017	Bangkok Glass	H	1–1	Katano 9' (pen.)	15th
14 October 2017	Buriram United	A	2–5	Pansa 1' (o.g.), Maranhão 73'	15th
22 October 2017	BEC Tero Sasana	A	1–1	Diouf 85'	15th
8 November 2017	Chonburi	H	3–1	Katano 11' (pen.), Maranhão 59', Kongnathichai 84'	15th
11 November 2017	Pattaya United	A	1–1	Maranhão 75'	15th
18 November 2017	Nakhon Ratchasima Mazda	A	1–1	Chompoo 48'	15th

Pos	Team	Pld	W	D	L	GF	GA	GD	Pts	Qualification or relegation
13	Navy	34	10	10	14	42	50	−8	40	
14	BEC Tero Sasana	34	10	9	15	42	57	−15	39	
15	Sukhothai	34	8	12	14	54	66	−12	36	
16	Thai Honda Ladkrabang (R)	34	8	4	22	43	68	−25	28	Relegation to the 2018 Thai League 2
17	Sisaket (R)	34	6	5	23	43	90	−47	23	Relegation to the 2018 Thai League 2

Updated to match(es) played on 18 November 2017. Source: Thai League
Rules for classification: 1) Points; 2) Head-to-head points; 3) Head-to-head goals difference; 4) Head-to-head goals scored; 5) Overall goals difference; 6) Overall goals scored; 7) Fair play points; 8) Play-off without extra time;).
(R) Relegated

== Thai FA Cup ==
Date	Opponents	H / A	Result F–A	Scorers	Round
21 June 2017	Chainat United	H	7–0	Kiattisak 16', Lursan (2) 45+1', 77', Sakdarin 61', Kritsana (3) 72', 80', 84'	Round of 64
2 August 2017	Chiangrai United	H	0–1		Round of 32

== Thai League Cup ==
Date	Opponents	H / A	Result F–A	Scorers	Round
26 July 2017	Kamphaengphet	A	1–0	Lursan 20'	Round of 32
1 October 2017	Pattaya United	H	2–2 (a.e.t.) (4–2p)	Myung-oh 45+3', Katano 69' (pen.)	Round of 16
11 October 2017	Ratchaburi Mitr Phol	A	0–1		Quarter-finals

== AFC Champions League ==
=== Qualifying rounds ===
Date	Opponents	H / A	Result F–A	Scorers	Round
31 January 2017	(Myanmar) Yadanarbon	H	5–0	Katano 10', Lursan 16', Adrović (2) 61' (pen.), 73', Weerasak 90'	Preliminary round 2
7 February 2017	(China) Shanghai SIPG	A	0–3		Play-off round

== Squad goals statistics ==
No.	Pos.	Name	League	FA Cup	League Cup	Asia	Total
1	GK	(Thailand) Anirut Naiyana	0	0	0	0	0
2	DF	(Thailand) Kiattisak Toopkhuntod	0	0	0	0	0
3	DF	(Thailand) Prat Samakrat	0	0	0	0	0
4	DF	(Japan) Hiromichi Katano	0	0	0	1	1
5	DF	(Thailand) Yuttapong Srilakorn	0	0	0	0	0
6	DF	(Thailand) Watcharapon Changkleungmoh	1	0	0	0	1
7	DF	(Thailand) Phontakorn Thosanthiah	0	0	0	0	0
8	MF	(Thailand) Anucha Suksai	0	0	0	0	0
9	FW	(Montenegro) Admir Adrović	0	0	0	2	2
10	MF	(Madagascar) John Baggio	3	0	0	0	3
11	FW	(Thailand) Kritsana Kasemkulvilai	0	0	0	0	0
12	FW	(Thailand) Chaipat Cheumsrijun	0	0	0	0	0
13	DF	(Thailand) Piyarat Lajungreed	0	0	0	0	0
14	MF	(Thailand) Nuttawut Khamrin	0	0	0	0	0
15	GK	(Thailand) Yutthapoom Srichai	0	0	0	0	0
17	FW	(Thailand) Kongnathichai Boonma	0	0	0	0	0
18	GK	(Thailand) Suchin Yen-arrom	0	0	0	0	0
19	MF	(Thailand) Athit Wisetsilp	0	0	0	0	0
20	MF	(Kyrgyzstan) Anton Zemlianukhin	2	0	0	0	2
22	DF	(Thailand) Tanawat Panchang	0	0	0	0	0
24	MF	(Thailand) Kabfah Boonmatoon	0	0	0	0	0
25	MF	(Thailand) Sakdarin Mingsamorn	0	0	0	0	0
27	FW	(Ivory Coast) Bireme Diouf	0	0	0	0	0
28	MF	(Thailand) Pichit Jaibun	0	0	0	0	0
31	DF	(Thailand) Chompoo Sangpo	0	0	0	0	0
34	MF	(Thailand) Lursan Thiamrat	0	0	0	1	1
35	GK	(Thailand) Pairot Eiammak	0	0	0	0	0
37	MF	(Thailand) Weerasak Gayasith	0	0	0	1	1
40	FW	(Thailand) Chettha Kokkaew	0	0	0	0	0

== Scorers ranking ==
Rank	No.	Name	League	FA	LC	AFC	Total
1	9	(Montenegro) Admir Adrović	0	0	0	2	2

== Transfers ==
First Thai footballer's market is opening on 14 December 2016 to 28 January 2017
Second Thai footballer's market is opening on 3 June 2017 to 30 June 2017

=== In ===
Date	Pos.	Name	From
24 October 2016	FW	(Thailand) Kongnathichai Boonma	(Thailand) Prachuap
24 October 2016	DF	(Thailand) Watcharapon Changkleungmoh	(Thailand) Khonkaen United
30 October 2016	MF	(Kyrgyzstan) Anton Zemlianukhin	(Thailand) Sisaket
18 November 2016	DF	(Thailand) Chompoo Sangpo	(Thailand) Sisaket
18 November 2016	MF	(Thailand) Nuttawut Khamrin	(Thailand) Sisaket
30 November 2016	MF	(Thailand) Pichit Jaibun	(Thailand) Chainat Hornbill
30 November 2016	MF	(Thailand) Athit Wisetsilp	(Thailand) Songkhla United
30 November 2016	GK	(Thailand) Suchin Yen-arrom	(Thailand) Nongbua Pitchaya
1 December 2016	FW	(Montenegro) Admir Adrović	(Montenegro) Mladost Podgorica
6 January 2017	MF	(Thailand) Weerasak Gayasith	(Thailand) Ayutthaya
6 January 2017	FW	(Thailand) Chettha Kokkaew	(Thailand) Udon Thani
25 January 2017	MF	(Thailand) Kabfah Boonmatoon	(Thailand) Ubon UMT United

=== Out ===
Date	Pos.	Name	To
22 October 2016	FW	(Brazil) Renan Marques	(Thailand) Chonburi
22 October 2016	MF	(Thailand) Alongkorn Thongjeen	(Thailand) Lampang
22 October 2016	MF	(Thailand) Kritsada Hemvipat	(Thailand) Nakhon Ratchasima Mazda
16 November 2016	MF	(Thailand) Pornpreecha Jarunai	(Thailand) Trat
17 November 2016	FW	(Thailand) Yod Chanthawong	(Thailand) Nakhon Pathom United
18 November 2016	DF	(Thailand) Witthawin Klorwuttiwat	(Thailand) Nongbua Pitchaya
18 November 2016	MF	(Thailand) Samerpark Srinont	(Thailand) Sisaket
18 November 2016	MF	(Thailand) Santirad Weing-in	(Thailand) Lampang
18 November 2016	MF	(Thailand) Thammanoon Salee	(South Korea) FC Uijeongbu
18 November 2016	FW	(Brazil) Alex Rafael	(Qatar) Al-Shamal
8 December 2016	FW	(Thailand) Jeerachai Ladadok	(Thailand) Lampang
1 July 2017	MF	(Kyrgyzstan) Anton Zemlianukhin	(Russia) FC SKA-Khabarovsk

=== Loan in ===
Date from	Date to	Pos.	Name	From
27 January 2017	31 December 2017	DF	(Thailand) Prat Samakrat	(Thailand) Bangkok United
