= 2016 Sukhothai F.C. season =

Sukhothai
2016 season
- Chairman: Somsak Thepsutin
- Manager: Somchai Chuayboonchum
- Stadium: Thung Thalay Luang Stadium
- Thai League: 2016 Thai Premier League
- Thai FA Cup: 2016 Thai FA Cup
- Thai League Cup: Round of 32
Home colours	Away colours

The 2016 season is Sukhothai first season in the Thai Premier League of Sukhothai Football Club.

== Players ==
=== Current squad ===
Note: Flags indicate national team as defined under FIFA eligibility rules; some limited exceptions apply. Players may hold more than one non-FIFA nationality.

No.	Pos.	Nation	Player
1	GK	(Thailand) THA	Yutthapoom Srichai
2	MF	(Thailand) THA	Samerpark Srinont
3	DF	(Thailand) THA	Witthawin Klorwuttiwat
4	DF	(Japan) JPN	Hiromichi Katano
5	DF	(Thailand) THA	Yuttapong Srilakorn (Captain)
7	MF	(Thailand) THA	Pornpreecha Jarunai
10	MF	(Madagascar) MAD	John Baggio
11	FW	(Thailand) THA	Kritsana Kasemkulvilai
13	DF	(Thailand) THA	Piyarat Lajungreed
14	MF	(Thailand) THA	Pongsakon Seerot (on loan from Bangkok United)
15	DF	(Thailand) THA	Kosawat Wongwailikit (on loan from Ratchaburi)
16	DF	(Thailand) THA	Suebsakul Pravisat
17	MF	(Thailand) THA	Suriyakarn Chimjeen
18	MF	(Thailand) THA	Piyachat Srimarueang
19	MF	(Thailand) THA	Anuchit Ngrnbukkol
21	MF	(Thailand) THA	Alongkorn Thongjean

No.	Pos.	Nation	Player
22	DF	(Thailand) THA	Tanawat Panchang
23	GK	(Thailand) THA	Sarawut Konglarp
25	MF	(Thailand) THA	Sakdarin Mingsamorn
26	FW	(Thailand) THA	Satawat Bandasak
27	FW	(Ivory Coast) CIV	Bireme Diouf
28	DF	(Thailand) THA	Wichitchai Chauyseenual
30	FW	(Thailand) THA	Yod Chanthawong
31	MF	(Thailand) THA	Laksana Kamruen (on loan from Chainat Hornbill)
32	MF	(Thailand) THA	Kritsada Hemvipat
33	FW	(Brazil) BRA	Renan Marques
34	MF	(Thailand) THA	Lursan Thiamrat
35	GK	(Thailand) THA	Pairot Eiammak
37	DF	(Thailand) THA	Kiattisak Toopkhuntod
38	GK	(Thailand) THA	Watcharaphol Boonchan
39	GK	(Thailand) THA	Anirut Naiyana

== Thai Premier League ==
Toyota Thai Premier League

Date	Opponents	H / A	Result F–A	Scorers	League position
5 March 2016	Sisaket	A	0–2		16th
9 March 2016	Chiangrai United	H	0–0		15th
13 March 2016	Chonburi	A	2–2	Baggio 14' 54'	16th
16 March 2016	Ratchaburi Mitr Phol	H	2–0	Katano 82' (pen.), Kritsana 90'	11th
30 March 2016	Pattaya United	H	1–0	Kritsana 77'	7th
3 April 2016	Suphanburi	A	3–2	Marques 45+2' 55' , Bireme 68'	7th
23 April 2016	Buriram United	H	0–1		9th
27 April 2016	Osotspa M-150 Samut Prakan	H	5–2	Marques 27' 33' , Piyachat 69' , Bireme 84' , Satawat 90+3'	7th
30 Apiril 2016	Nakhon Ratchasima Mazda	A	3–1	Piyachat 43' , Bireme 82' , Baggio 90+3'	5th
8 May 2016	BBCU	H	4–1	Kritsada 23' , Bireme 44' , Piyachat 61' , Wichitchai 80'	5th
11 May 2016	Army United	A	1–1	Bireme 73'	5th
14 May 2016	Chainat Hornbill	H	2–1	Bireme 35' , Marques 66'	4th
21 May 2016	SCG Muangthong United	A	1–2	Bireme 86'	5th
28 May 2016	BEC Tero Sasana	H	2–2	Bireme 3', Katano 85'	5th
11 June 2016	Bangkok Glass	A	1–2	Katano 39' (pen.)	6th
19 June 2016	Navy	H	2–2	Piyachat 32', Bireme 60'	7th
22 June 2016	Bangkok United	A	2–4	Bireme 2', Marques 68'	7th
25 June 2016	Sisaket	H	1–1	Marques 47'	7th
29 June 2016	Chiangrai United	A	0–2		7th
3 July 2016	Chonburi	H	1–2	Marques 11'	8th

== Thai League Cup ==
Toyota League Cup

Date	Opponents	H / A	Result F–A	Scorers	Round
10 April 2016	Cha Choeng Sao	A	1–1 (4–1p)	Kritsana 61'	Round of 64
8 June 2016	Khonkaen	A			Round of 32
