= 2017 Buriram United F.C. season =

Buriram United
2017 season
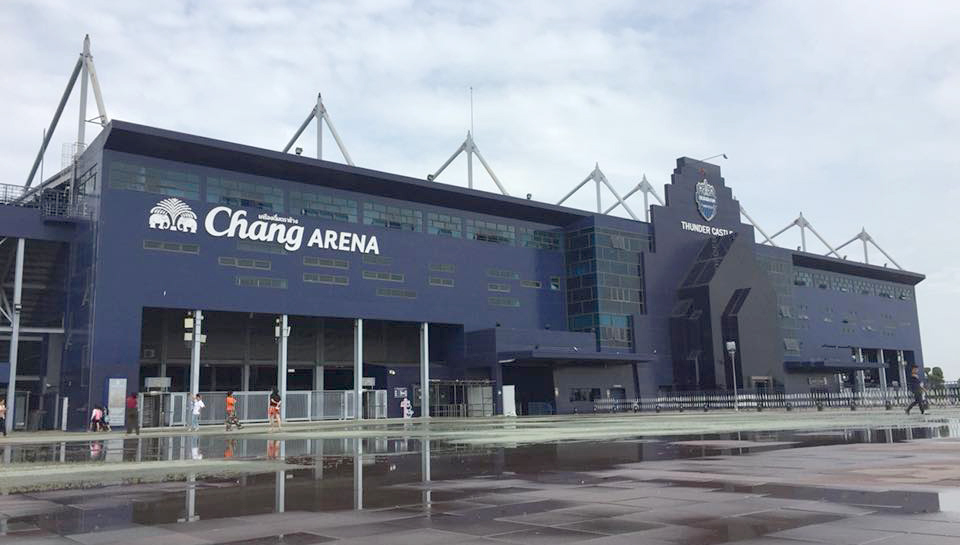
- I-Mobile Stadium in 2017
- Chairman: Newin Chidchob
- Manager: Ranko Popović (until 13 June 2017); Božidar Bandović (from 14 June 2017)
- Stadium: I-Mobile Stadium
- Thai League T1: Champions
- FA Cup: Quarter-finals (knocked out by Chiangrai United)
- League Cup: Quarter-finals (knocked out by SCG Muangthong United)
- Mekong Club Championship: Winners
- Top goalscorer: League: Jajá Coelho (34); All: Jajá Coelho (39)
- Highest home attendance: 32,600 v Muangthong United (3 April 2017, Thai League T1)
- Lowest home attendance: 5,088 v Phitsanulok (2 August 2017, FA Cup)
Home colours	Away colours	Third colours

The 2017 season is Buriram United's 6th season in the Thai League T1. The club enters the season as the Thai League 4th place, and will participate in the 2017 Thai League T1. They enter this season looking to rebound from a disappointing previous season. The club will also participate in the FA Cup, League Cup and Mekong Club Championship, but will not participate in the Champions Cup and AFC Champions League.

== Club ==
=== Other information ===
Owner	(Thailand) Newin Chidchob
Ground (capacity and dimensions)	I-Mobile Stadium (32,600 / 4,046 m^{2})
Training Ground	Chang Training Ground, Buriram; Buriram United Football Camp, Samut Prakan

Source: Club

== Squad information ==
=== First team squad ===
As of 1 July 2017

Squad No.	Name	Nationality	Position(s)	Date of birth (age)
Goalkeepers
1	Siwarak Tedsungnoen	(Thailand)	GK	20 April 1984 (age 42)
29	Yotsapon Teangdar	(Thailand)	GK	6 April 1992 (age 34)
Defenders
2	Delvin Pinheiro	(Thailand) (Netherlands)	DF	26 September 1995 (age 31)
3	Pansa Hemviboon	(Thailand)	DF	8 July 1990 (age 36)
5	Andrés Túñez	(Venezuela)	DF	15 March 1987 (age 39)
11	Korrakot Wiriyaudomsiri	(Thailand)	DF	19 March 1988 (age 38)
13	Narubadin Weerawatnodom	(Thailand)	DF	12 July 1994 (age 32)
14	Chitipat Tanklang	(Thailand)	DF	11 August 1991 (age 35)
16	Koravit Namwiset	(Thailand)	DF	2 August 1986 (age 40)
31	Abdulhafiz Bueraheng	(Thailand)	DF	17 October 1995 (age 31)
Midfielders
4	Naruphon Putsorn	(Thailand) (England)	MF	21 July 1988 (age 38)
6	Sasalak Haiprakhon	(Thailand)	MF	8 January 1996 (age 30)
7	Go Seul-ki	(South Korea)	MF	21 April 1986 (age 40)
8	Suchao Nuchnum	(Thailand)	MF	17 May 1983 (age 43)
10	Jakkaphan Kaewprom	(Thailand)	MF	24 May 1988 (age 38)
15	Bodin Phala	(Thailand)	MF	20 December 1994 (age 31)
19	Supachok Sarachat	(Thailand)	MF	22 May 1998 (age 28)
26	Ratthanakorn Maikami	(Thailand)	MF	1 January 1998 (age 28)
27	Wuttikrai Pathan	(Thailand)	MF	9 January 1995 (age 31)
28	Phanuphong Phonsa	(Thailand)	MF	3 June 1994 (age 32)
60	Rafael Bastos	(Brazil)	MF	1 January 1985 (age 41)
Strikers
22	Supachai Jaided	(Thailand)	FW	1 December 1998 (age 27)
32	Arthit Butjinda	(Thailand)	FW	7 August 1994 (age 32)
34	Anon Amornlerdsak	(Thailand)	FW	6 November 1997 (age 29)
40	Diogo Luís Santo	(Brazil)	FW	26 May 1987 (age 39)
50	Jakson Avelino Coelho	(Brazil)	FW	28 February 1986 (age 40)

== Transfers ==
=== In ===
==== 1st leg ====
No.	Pos	Player	Transferred From	Fee	Date	Source
20	MF	(Brazil) Rogerinho	Kuwait SC	?	October 11, 2016	
3	DF	(Thailand) Pansa Hemviboon	(Thailand) Khon Kaen United	?	October 18, 2016	
22	FW	(Thailand) Supachai Jaided	(Thailand) Super Power Samut Prakan	?	October 24, 2016	
42	DF	(Thailand) Jakkrapong Suebsamutr	(Thailand) Super Power Samut Prakan	?	October 24, 2016	
43	DF	(Thailand) Adisak Narattho	(Thailand) Super Power Samut Prakan	?	October 24, 2016	
4	MF	(Thailand) Naruphon Putsorn	(Thailand) BBCU	?	October 25, 2016	
2	DF	(Thailand) Yossawat Montha	(Thailand) Nakhon Pathom United	?	November 3, 2016	
50	FW	(Brazil) Jakson Avelino Coelho	(Belgium) Lokeren	?	January 13, 2017	
23	DF	(Iceland) Sölvi Ottesen	(China) Wuhan Zall	?	February 6, 2017	

==== 2nd leg ====
No.	Pos	Player	Transferred From	Fee	Date	Source
60	MF	(Brazil) Rafael Bastos	(Brazil) Botafogo-SP	?	May 19, 2017	
2	DF	(Thailand) Delvin Pinheiro	(Netherlands) HBS Craeyenhout	?	June 19, 2017	

=== Out ===
==== 1st leg ====
No.	Pos	Player	Transferred To	Fee	Date	Source
—	DF	(Thailand) Suree Sukha	(Thailand) Ubon UMT United	?	October 21, 2016	
—	MF	(Thailand) Surat Sukha	(Thailand) Ubon UMT United	?	October 21, 2016	
—	MF	(Thailand) Chaowat Veerachat	(Thailand) Bangkok Glass	?	October 22, 2016	
—	MF	(Thailand) Adul Lahsoh	(Thailand) Suphanburi	?	October 27, 2016	
—	FW	(Thailand) Anan Buasang	(Thailand) Prachuap	?	November 2, 2016	
—	MF	(South Korea) Kim Seung-yong	(South Korea) Gangwon	?	December 13, 2016	
—	GK	(Thailand) Kwanchai Suklom	(Thailand) Prachuap	?	December 14, 2016	
—	DF	(Thailand) Anawin Jujeen	(Thailand) Suphanburi	?	February 5, 2017	
—	MF	(Thailand) Alexander Sieghart	(Thailand) Bangkok United	?	February 6, 2017	
—	DF	(Thailand) Sathaporn Daengsee	(Thailand) Bangkok United	?	February 6, 2017	
—	DF	(Thailand) Sakeereen Teekasom	(Thailand) Bangkok Glass	?	February 13, 2017	
—	MF	(Brazil) Kanu	Free agent	?	February 14, 2017	
—	FW	(Brazil) Kaio	(China) Yunnan Lijiang	?	February 22, 2017	

==== 2nd leg ====
No.	Pos	Player	Transferred To	Fee	Date	Source
—	DF	(Thailand) Yossawat Montha	(Thailand) Port	?	May 11, 2017	
—	FW	(Brazil) Rogerinho	Free agent	?	May 15, 2017	
—	DF	(Thailand) Patipan Un-Op	(Thailand) Thai Honda Ladkrabang	?	May 22, 2017	
—	MF	(Thailand) Baramee Limwattana	(Thailand) Thai Honda Ladkrabang	?	May 22, 2017	
—	GK	(Thailand) Chinnapong Raksri	(Thailand) Ratchaburi Mitr Phol	?	June 10, 2017	
—	DF	(Iceland) Sölvi Ottesen	Free agent	?	June 14, 2017	

=== Loan in ===
==== 1st leg ====
No.	Pos	Player	Loaned From	Start	End	Source
—	MF	(Thailand) Phanuphong Phonsa	(Thailand) Chonburi	February 15, 2017	December 31, 2017	

==== 2nd leg ====
No.	Pos	Player	Loaned From	Start	End	Source
—	MF	(Thailand) Sasalak Haiprakhon	(Thailand) Bangkok United	May 5, 2017	December 31, 2017	

=== Loan out ===
==== 1st leg ====
No.	Pos	Player	Loaned To	Start	End	Source
—	DF	(Thailand) Nattapon Malapun	(Thailand) Chonburi	September 22, 2016	December 31, 2017	
—	DF	(Venezuela) Andrés Túñez	(Spain) Elche	January 31, 2017	June 30, 2017	
—	FW	(Thailand) Sittichok Kannoo	(Thailand) Thai Honda Ladkrabang	February 6, 2017	December 31, 2017	
—	DF	(Thailand) Adisak Sensom-Eiad	(Thailand) Nongbua Pitchaya	February 8, 2017	December 31, 2017	
—	MF	(Thailand) Chitpanya Tisud	(Thailand) Bangkok Glass	February 14, 2017	December 31, 2017	

==== 2nd leg ====
No player loaned out

== Kit ==
Supplier: BRUTD Kit Manufacturer / Sponsor: Chang

Home	Away	Away alt.	Third	Goalkeeper 1st	Goalkeeper 2nd

== Pre-season and friendlies ==
Win Draw Loss

23 December 2016 Friendly	Nakhon Ratchasima (Thailand)	0–2	(Thailand) Buriram United	Nakhon Ratchasima, Thailand
18:30 UTC+7			Anawin 54'; Túñez 114'	Stadium: 80th Birthday Stadium; Referee: Prapon Dissomsri

28 December 2016 Friendly	Buriram United (Thailand)	3–0	(Thailand) Thai Honda Ladkrabang	Buriram, Thailand
17:30 UTC+7	Seul-ki 4'; Anon 74'; Túñez 94'			Stadium: Khao Kradong Stadium

10 January 2017 Friendly	Buriram United (Thailand)	5–2	(Thailand) Chainat Hornbill	Buriram, Thailand
17:00 UTC+7	Supachai; Arthit; Supachok; Anawin; Sittichok		Jirawat; Ratchanat	Stadium: Khao Kradong Stadium

14 January 2017 Friendly	Buriram United (Thailand)	1–0	(Malaysia) Johor Darul Ta'zim	Buriram, Thailand
19:00 UTC+7	Diogo 6'			Stadium: I-Mobile Stadium

18 January 2017 Friendly	MNL All Stars (Myanmar)	Cancelled	(Thailand) Buriram United	Yangon, Myanmar
UTC+6:30				Stadium: Thuwunna Stadium

18 January 2017 Friendly	Phnom Penh Crown (Cambodia)	0–6	(Thailand) Buriram United	Phnom Penh, Cambodia
18:00 UTC+7			Supachok 9', 70'; Diogo 13', 36'; Sakeereen 82'; Supachai 90'	Stadium: RSN Stadium

22 January 2017 Friendly	Buriram United (Thailand)	3–0	(Cambodia) Army	Buriram, Thailand
18:30 UTC+7	Diogo 19' (pen.), 53'; Pansa 50'			Stadium: I-Mobile Stadium

27 January 2017 Friendly	Buriram United (Thailand)	0–1	(South Korea) Incheon United	Buriram, Thailand
18:00 UTC+7		Report	Lee Hyo-kyun 44'	Stadium: I-Mobile Stadium

29 January 2017 Friendly	Satun United (Thailand)	1–0	(Thailand) Buriram United	Satun, Thailand
17:00 UTC+7	Konomura 90+4'			Stadium: Satun Provincial Administrative Organization Stadium

4 February 2017 Friendly	Angthong (Thailand)	1–3	(Thailand) Buriram United	Ang Thong, Thailand
18:00 UTC+7	Babo 29'		Diogo 60'; Jajá 69', 85'	Stadium: Ang Thong Province Stadium

22 March 2017 Friendly	Nara United (Thailand)	1–2	(Thailand) Buriram United	Narathiwat, Thailand
18:00 UTC+7	Alef 49'		Diogo 9', 39'	Stadium: Narathiwat Provincial Administrative Organization Stadium

4 June 2017 Friendly	Prachuap (Thailand)	3–5	(Thailand) Buriram United	Prachuap Khiri Khan, Thailand
18:00 UTC+7	Sutee 66'; Laércio 77'; Nawapol 86'		Diogo 12', 31' (pen.), 65'; Arthit 34'; Naruphon 73'	Stadium: Sam Ao Stadium

23 August 2017 Friendly	Ranong United (Thailand)	1–1	(Thailand) Buriram United	Ranong, Thailand
18:00 UTC+7	Varin 11'		Jajá 49'	Stadium: Ranong Province Stadium

26 August 2017 Friendly	Krabi (Thailand)	2–4	(Thailand) Buriram United	Krabi, Thailand
18:00 UTC+7	Supot Jodjam 66'; Aron da Silva 90+2'		Diogo 45+1', 90'; Suchao 52'; Bastos 70'	Stadium: Krabi Provincial Stadium

== Competitions ==
=== Overview ===
Competition	First match	Last match	Starting round	Final position	Record							
Competition	First match	Last match	Starting round	Final position	Pld	W	D	L	GF	GA	GD	Win %
Thai League T1	12 February 2017	18 November 2017	Matchday 1	Winners	34	27	5	2	85	22	+63	79.41
FA Cup	21 June 2017	18 October 2017	First Round	Quarter-finals	4	3	0	1	8	2	+6	75.00
League Cup	26 July 2017	11 October 2017	First Round	Quarter-finals	3	1	1	1	3	4	−1	33.33
Mekong Club Championship	4 January 2017	8 January 2017	Final	Winners	2	1	0	1	2	1	+1	50.00
Total					43	32	6	5	98	29	+69	74.42

Last updated: 18 November 2017
Source: Competitions

=== Mekong Club Championship ===
4 January 2017 Final – 1st leg	Lanexang United (Laos)	1–0	(Thailand) Buriram United	Vientiane, Laos
18:00 UTC+7:00	Khampheng 17'; Sengdao (yellow card)	Report	Suchao (yellow card)	Stadium: Chao Anouvong Stadium; Referee: Muhammad Nazmi Nasaruddin (Malaysia)

8 January 2017 Final – 2nd leg	Buriram United (Thailand)	2–0 (2–1 agg.)	(Laos) Lanexang United	Pathum Thani, Thailand
19:00 UTC+7:00	Diogo 38' (pen.); Seul-ki 51'; Jakkaphan (yellow card); Naruphon (yellow card)	Report	Aaron (yellow card); Yamazaki (yellow card); Soukthavy (yellow card); Vilayout (yellow card); Soukaphone (yellow card) (yellow-red card)	Stadium: Thammasat Stadium; Referee: Muhammad Taqi Aljaafari (Singapore)

=== Thai League T1 ===
==== League table ====
Pos	Team	Pld	W	D	L	GF	GA	GD	Pts	Qualification or relegation
1	Buriram United (C, Q)	34	27	5	2	85	22	+63	86	Qualification to 2018 AFC Champions League Group stage
2	SCG Muangthong United (Q)	34	22	6	6	79	29	+50	72	Qualification to 2018 AFC Champions League Preliminary round 2
3	Bangkok United	34	21	3	10	97	57	+40	66	
4	Chiangrai United (Q)	34	18	6	10	67	42	+25	60	Qualification to 2018 AFC Champions League Preliminary round 2 (Note: Chiangrai United qualified for the 2018 AFC Champions League Preliminary round 2 as winners of the 2017 Thai FA Cup.)
5	Bangkok Glass	34	16	8	10	63	44	+19	56	

Updated to match(es) played on 18 November 2017. Source: Thai League
Rules for classification: 1) Points; 2) Head-to-head points; 3) Head-to-head goals difference; 4) Head-to-head goals scored; 5) Overall goals difference; 6) Overall goals scored; 7) Fair play points; 8) Play-off without extra time;).
(C) Champions; (Q) Qualified for the phase indicated

==== Results summary ====
Overall								Home						Away					
Pld	W	D	L	GF	GA	GD	Pts	W	D	L	GF	GA	GD	W	D	L	GF	GA	GD
34	27	5	2	85	22	+63	86	15	1	1	44	9	+35	12	4	1	41	13	+28

==== Results by matchday ====
Matchday	1	2	3	4	5	6	7	8	9	10	11	12	13	14	15	16	17	18	19	20	21	22	23	24	25	26	27	28	29	30	31	32	33	34
Ground	H	A	H	A	H	A	H	A	H	A	H	A	H	A	H	A	H	H	A	H	A	H	A	H	A	H	A	H	A	H	A	H	A	A
Result	D	W	W	W	W	D	W	D	W	W	W	L	L	W	W	D	W	W	W	W	W	W	D	W	W	W	W	W	W	W	W	W	W	W
Position	8	5	4	3	2	3	3	3	3	2	2	2	2	2	2	2	1	1	1	1	1	1	1	1	1	1	1	1	1	1	1	1	1	1

Updated to match(es) played on 18 November 2017. Source: Thai League T1
A = Away; H = Home; W = Win; D = Draw; L = Loss

==== Matches ====
The fixtures for 1st leg of the 2017 season were announced on 12 January 2017, and those for 2nd leg were revealed on 22 May 2017.

12 February 2017 1	Buriram United	2–2	Chonburi	Buriram
18:00 UTC+7	Suchao (yellow card) 54'; Korrakot (yellow card) 65'; Jajá 74'; Sölvi 78', (yellow card) 83'	Report	Nurul 40', 43'; André Luís (yellow card) 66'	Stadium: I-Mobile Stadium; Attendance: 29,891; Referee: Phumrin Kumruen; Man of the Match: André Luís Leite (Chonburi)

18 February 2017 2	Navy	1–2	Buriram United	Sattahip, Chonburi
19:00 UTC+7	Yuttajak (yellow card) 63'; Chusana 85'	Report	Ratthanakorn (yellow card) 35'; Jajá 45+2'; Jakkaphan 51'; Narubadin (yellow card) 56'	Stadium: Sattahip Navy Stadium; Attendance: 4,762; Referee: Prakit Sukyang; Man of the Match: Jakson Avelino Coelho (Buriram United)

25 February 2017 3	Buriram United	2–0	Pattaya United	Buriram
17:45 UTC+7	Diogo 65'; Korrakot (yellow card) 76'; Supachai (yellow card) 90'; Supachok 90+4'	Report	Suphanan (yellow card) 20'; Chaiyawat (yellow card) 60'	Stadium: I-Mobile Stadium; Attendance: 10,398; Referee: Wiwornrod Jumpa-aon; Man of the Match: Diogo (Buriram United)

4 March 2017 4	Thai Honda Ladkrabang	1–5	Buriram United	Min Buri, Bangkok
19:00 UTC+7	Meedech (yellow card) 66'; Suppasek 90+4'	Report	Diogo 22'; Jajá 38'; Seul-ki (yellow card) 49'; Supachok 50', 57', 90+4'	Stadium: 72nd Anniversary Stadium; Attendance: 4,436; Referee: Warinthorn Satdee; Man of the Match: Siwarak Tedsungnoen (Buriram United)

8 March 2017 5	Buriram United	4–0	Nakhon Ratchasima	Buriram
18:00 UTC+7	Jajá 17', 39'; Supachok 20'; Yossawat (yellow card) 74'; Diogo (yellow card) 77', (goal) 90' (pen.); Sölvi (yellow card) 90+2'	Report	Eakkanut (yellow card) 45'; Chanatphol (yellow card) 67'; Chalermpong (red card) 77'	Stadium: I-Mobile Stadium; Attendance: 10,509; Referee: Thitichai Nualchan; Man of the Match: Jakson Avelino Coelho (Buriram United)

11 March 2017 6	Port	0–0	Buriram United	Khlong Toei, Bangkok
19:00 UTC+7	David (yellow card) 13'; Adisorn (yellow card) 22'; Todsapol (yellow card) 32'; Siwakorn (yellow card) 80'	Report	Suchao (yellow card) 19'; Diogo (yellow card) 32' (yellow-red card) 70'; Sölvi (yellow card) 64'; Jakkaphan (yellow card) 90+3'	Stadium: PAT Stadium; Attendance: 6,905; Referee: Chaktrawut Chunlamat; Man of the Match: Rattanai Songsangchan (Port)

3 April 2017 7	Buriram United	2–0	SCG Muangthong United	Buriram
19:00 UTC+7	Jajá 5'; Go Seul-ki (yellow card) 44'; Korrakot (yellow card) 50'; Suchao 83'	Report	Teerasil (yellow card) 42'; Célio (yellow card) 59' (yellow-red card) 90+3'; Do (yellow card) 66'; Aoyama (yellow card) 82'	Stadium: I-Mobile Stadium; Attendance: 32,600; Referee: Natee Chusuwan; Man of the Match: Jakson Avelino Coelho (Buriram United)

9 April 2017 8	Ubon UMT United	1–1	Buriram United	Ubon Ratchathani
19:00 UTC+7	Chalermsak 18'; Watchara (yellow card) 19'; Nebihi (yellow card) 29'; Mariano (yellow card) 89'	Report	Diogo 15'; Panupong (yellow card) 54'; Korrakot (yellow card) 76'; Suchao (yellow card) 90+2'	Stadium: UMT Stadium; Attendance: 5,845; Referee: Prakit Sukyang; Man of the Match: Diogo Luís Santo (Buriram United)

18 April 2017 9	Buriram United	3–0	Super Power Samut Prakan	Buriram
18:00 UTC+7	Jajá 31', 42'; Diogo 62'	Report	Jiradech (yellow card) 24'; Suradech (yellow card) 27'; Nikolov (yellow card) 86'	Stadium: I-Mobile Stadium; Attendance: 8,896; Referee: Warinthorn Satdee; Man of the Match: Jakson Avelino Coelho (Buriram United)

23 April 2017 10	Chiangrai United	1–2	Buriram United	Chiang Rai
18:00 UTC+7	Vander 14', (yellow card) 90'; Thossawat (yellow card) 31'; Worawut (yellow card) 36'; Suriya (yellow card) 60'; Pattara (yellow card) 61'; Everton (yellow card) 90+5'	Report	Seul-ki (yellow card) 74', (goal) 79'; Jajá 85'	Stadium: Singha Stadium; Attendance: 11,309; Referee: Mongkolchai Phetsri; Man of the Match: Diogo Luís Santo (Buriram United)

29 April 2017 11	Buriram United	3–0	Sisaket	Buriram
20:00 UTC+7	Diogo 16', 57'; Supachok 81'	Report	Assumpção (yellow card) 47'	Stadium: I-Mobile Stadium; Attendance: 12,681; Referee: Witsawet Sangnakhon; Man of the Match: Diogo Luís Santo (Buriram United)

3 May 2017 12	Bangkok Glass	2–1	Buriram United	Thanyaburi, Pathum Thani
19:00 UTC+7	Piyachanok (yellow card) 25'; Supachai 63'; Chatree (yellow card) 71'; Smith (yellow card) 78'; Campos 88'	Report	Jajá 18'	Stadium: Leo Stadium; Attendance: 8,419; Referee: Prapoj Dissomsri; Man of the Match: Jhasmani Campos (Bangkok Glass)

7 May 2017 13	Buriram United	3–4	Ratchaburi Mitr Phol	Buriram
18:00 UTC+7	Jajá 25', 63'; Jakkaphan (yellow card) 55'; Seul-ki (yellow card) 66'; Diogo 69' (pen.)	Report	Sompong 11'; Takafumi 17'; Essombé 19', 90+4', (yellow card) 23'; Kevin (yellow card) 42'; Ukrit (yellow card) 67'; Chutipol (yellow card) 68'	Stadium: I-Mobile Stadium; Attendance: 9,397; Referee: Niwat Insa-ad; Man of the Match: Jakson Avelino Coelho (Buriram United)

13 May 2017 14	Sukhothai	1–3	Buriram United	Sukhothai
17:45 UTC+7	Adrović (yellow card) 45+1'; Pichit (yellow card) 49'; Phontakorn (yellow card) 59'; Kabfah 70'; Yuttapong (yellow card) 74'; Diouf (yellow card) 79'; Baggio (yellow card) 80'; Lursan (yellow card) 89'; Sakdarin (red card) 90+5'	Report	Bodin (yellow card) 20'; Phanuphong (yellow card) 29'; Diogo 76' (pen.), 84' (pen.), 90+5'	Stadium: Thalay Luang Stadium; Attendance: 7,540; Referee: Prapoj Dissomsri; Man of the Match: Diogo Luís Santo (Buriram United)

17 May 2017 15	Buriram United	3–0	Suphanburi	Buriram
17:45 UTC+7	Seul-ki 39'; Anon 41'; Jajá 50'; Arthit (yellow card) 81'	Report	Marcelo (yellow card) 87'	Stadium: I-Mobile Stadium; Attendance: 8,316; Referee: Ketdamrong Khemthong; Man of the Match: Diogo Luís Santo (Buriram United)

21 May 2017 16	BEC Tero Sasana	2–2	Buriram United	Lak Si, Bangkok
18:00 UTC+7	Datsakorn 29' (pen.); Wichan (yellow card) 53', (goal) 67'	Report	Diogo 11', 78'; Ratthanakorn (yellow card) 86'	Stadium: Boonyachinda Stadium; Attendance: 3,160; Referee: Niwat Insa-ad; Man of the Match: Diogo Luís Santo (Buriram United)

27 May 2017 17	Buriram United	2–1	Bangkok United	Buriram
19:00 UTC+7	Jakkaphan 29', (yellow card) 84'; Diogo 66'	Report	Putthinan (yellow card) 33'; Tavares (yellow card) 36'; Wittaya (yellow card) 51'; Gjurovski (yellow card) 81', (goal) 90+2'; Teeratep (yellow card) 89'	Stadium: I-Mobile Stadium; Attendance: 15,123; Referee: Witsawet Sangnakhon; Man of the Match: Diogo Luís Santo (Buriram United)

17 June 2017 18	Buriram United	2–0	Navy	Buriram
19:00 UTC+7	Jajá 25'; Túñez (yellow card) 59'; Bodin 83'	Report	Durosinmi (yellow card) 57'; Seung-hwan (yellow card) 61'; Chontawat (yellow card) 62'; Panuwat (yellow card) 90+3'	Stadium: I-Mobile Stadium; Attendance: 8,467; Referee: Warinthorn Satdee; Man of the Match: Jakson Avelino Coelho (Buriram United)

24 June 2017 19	Pattaya United	0–2	Buriram United	Bang Lamung, Chonburi
19:00 UTC+7	Peeradon (red card) 82'	Report	Diogo 63'; Jajá 73'	Stadium: Nong Prue Stadium; Attendance: 5,838; Referee: Mongkolchai Phechsri; Man of the Match: Diogo Luís Santo (Buriram United)

28 June 2017 20	Buriram United	2–0	Thai Honda Ladkrabang	Buriram
18:00 UTC+7	Túñez 18'; Suchao (yellow card) 28'; Diogo 45+2'; Supachai (yellow card) 51'	Report	Heman (yellow card) 16'; Ricardo (yellow card) 23'; Suphot (yellow card) 66'	Stadium: I-Mobile Stadium; Attendance: 9,356; Referee: Chaiporn Yongsaeng; Man of the Match: Andrés Túñez (Buriram United)

1 July 2017 21	Nakhon Ratchasima	0–2	Buriram United	Nakhon Ratchasima
19:00 UTC+7	Nattapong (yellow card) 59'	Report	Bastos 6'; Narubadin (yellow card) 48'; Sasalak (yellow card) 51'; Jakkaphan 64'	Stadium: 80th Birthday Stadium; Attendance: 10,082; Referee: Phumrin Kamruen; Man of the Match: Jakkaphan Kaewprom (Buriram United)

5 July 2017 22	Buriram United	1–0	Port	Buriram
18:00 UTC+7	Jajá 27'; Sasalak (yellow card) 55'	Report	Ittipol (yellow card) 49'; S. Suárez (yellow card) 52'	Stadium: I-Mobile Stadium; Attendance: 14,725; Referee: Witsawet Sangnakhon; Man of the Match: Jakson Avelino Coelho (Buriram United)

9 July 2017 23	SCG Muangthong United	1–1	Buriram United	Pak Kret, Nonthaburi
19:00 UTC+7	Assumpção 88'; Theerathon (yellow card) 90'	Report	Bastos 47'; Supachai (yellow card) 67'; Narubadin (yellow card) 90+1'; Siwarak (yellow card) 90+4'; Koravit (yellow card) 90+4'	Stadium: SCG Stadium; Attendance: 12,500; Referee: Phumrin Kamruen; Man of the Match: Leandro Assumpção (Muangthong United)

29 July 2017 24	Buriram United	4–0	Ubon UMT United	Buriram
20:00 UTC+7	Jajá 5', 40', 90+2'; Bastos 66'; Jakkaphan (yellow card) 76'; Diogo (yellow card) 82'; Narubadin (yellow card) 88'	Report	Adisak (yellow card) 42'; Suree (yellow card) 65'	Stadium: I-Mobile Stadium; Attendance: 14,189; Referee: Torpong Somsing; Man of the Match: Jakson Avelino Coelho (Buriram United)

6 August 2017 25	Super Power Samut Prakan	0–7	Buriram United	Bang Phli, Samut Prakan
18:00 UTC+7		Report	Jajá 44', 52', 65', 90+3'; Bastos 47'; Supachok 50'; Seul-ki 77'	Stadium: Samut Prakarn SAT Stadium; Attendance: 3,191; Referee: Arkhom Charoensuk; Man of the Match: Jakson Avelino Coelho (Buriram United)

10 September 2017 26	Buriram United	1–0	Chiangrai United	Buriram
19:00 UTC+7	Jajá 44', (yellow card) 90+2'; Siwarak (yellow card) 90+3'	Report	Phitiwat (yellow card) 31'; Atit (yellow card) 37'; Chaiyawat (yellow card) 63'; Thitipan (yellow card) 90+3'	Stadium: I-Mobile Stadium; Attendance: 15,649; Referee: Wiwat Champa-on; Man of the Match: Jakson Avelino Coelho (Buriram United)

16 September 2017 27	Sisaket	1–5	Buriram United	Sisaket
18:00 UTC+7	Ekkapan 38'; Suriyakarn (penalty missed) 61', (yellow card) 61'; Yai (yellow card) 75'; Yuttana (yellow card) 81'; Chalitpong (yellow card) 84'	Report	Diogo 3', 89'; Jajá 17', 28', 45+1'	Stadium: Sri Nakhon Lamduan Stadium; Attendance: 3,040; Referee: Torpong Somsing; Man of the Match: Jakson Avelino Coelho (Buriram United)

20 September 2017 28	Buriram United	1–0	Bangkok Glass	Buriram
20:00 UTC+7	Jajá 90'; Jakkaphan (yellow card) 90+5'	Report	Peerapong (yellow card) 45+1'; Chaowat (yellow card) 84'	Stadium: I-Mobile Stadium; Attendance: 10,313; Referee: Natee Chusuwan; Man of the Match: Peerapong Pichitchotirat (Bangkok Glass)

24 September 2017 29	Ratchaburi Mitr Phol	0–2	Buriram United	Ratchaburi
19:00 UTC+7	Rungrath (yellow card) 50'; Pathomchai (yellow card) 59'	Report	Chitipat (yellow card) 34'; Pansa (yellow card) 48'; Diogo 55'; Seul-ki (yellow card) 68'; Jakkaphan 70'; Narubadin (yellow card) 76'	Stadium: Mitr Phol Stadium; Attendance: 6,342; Referee: Dusit Iamsakul; Man of the Match: Diogo Luís Santo (Buriram United)

14 October 2017 30	Buriram United	5–2	Sukhothai	Buriram
19:00 UTC+7	Diogo 43', 90+3'; Jajá 49', 52', 57'	Report	Pansa 1' (o.g.); Maranhão (yellow card) 60', (goal) 73'	Stadium: I-Mobile Stadium; Attendance: 9,860; Referee: Suwat Wongsuwan; Man of the Match: Jakson Avelino Coelho (Buriram United)

22 October 2017 31	Suphanburi	0–1	Buriram United	Suphan Buri
19:00 UTC+7	Tinnakorn (yellow card) 27'; Adul (yellow card) 49'; Wasan (red card) 62'; Elizeu (yellow card) 90+3'	Report	Suchao (yellow card) 23'; Túñez (yellow card) 90+3'; Diogo 90+4' (pen.), (yellow card) 90+4'	Stadium: Suphan Buri Provincial Stadium; Attendance: 17,559; Referee: Arkhom Charoensuk; Man of the Match: Sinthaweechai Hathairattanakool (Suphanburi)

8 November 2017 32	Buriram United	4–0	BEC Tero Sasana	Buriram
19:00 UTC+7	Jajá 6', 20'; Diogo 14' (pen.), (yellow card) 83'; Suchao 61'; Ratthanakorn (yellow card) 65'; Anon (yellow card) 90+1'	Report	Cissé (yellow card) 13'; Sittichok (yellow card) 83'; Phuwanart (yellow card) 90+1'	Stadium: I-Mobile Stadium; Attendance: 15,767; Referee: Natee Chusuwan; Man of the Match: Jakson Avelino Coelho (Buriram United)

12 November 2017 33	Bangkok United	1–3	Buriram United	Khlong Luang, Pathum Thani
18:00 UTC+7	Mika (yellow card) 48'; Gjurovski 61'	Report	Diogo 49' (pen.); Pansa 58'; Jakkaphan (yellow card) 73'; Jajá 78'; Suchao (yellow card) 90+1'	Stadium: Thammasat Stadium; Attendance: 4,557; Referee: Chairurk Ngamsom; Man of the Match: Diogo Luís Santo (Buriram United)

18 November 2017 34	Chonburi	1–2	Buriram United	Mueang Chonburi, Chonburi
18:00 UTC+7	Renan 13' (pen.); Chanin (yellow card) 59'; Tatchanon (yellow card) 61'; Phanuphong (yellow card) 86'	Report	Túñez (yellow card) 12'; Korrakot (yellow card) 26'; Suchao (yellow card) 47'; Diogo 63' (pen.), 76'	Stadium: Chonburi Stadium; Attendance: 3,818; Referee: Thitichai Nuanchan; Man of the Match: Diogo Luís Santo (Buriram United)

=== FA Cup ===
21 June 2017 First Round	Ratchaburi Mitr Phol	0–1	Buriram United	Ratchaburi
19:00 UTC+7	Pathomchai (yellow card) 84'; Chompon (yellow card) 89'	Report	Korrakot (yellow card) 22'; Jajá 74'; Diogo (yellow card) 89'	Stadium: Mitr Phol Stadium; Attendance: 6,364; Referee: Mongkolchai Phechsri; Man of the Match: Jakson Avelino Coelho (Buriram United)

2 August 2017 Second Round	Buriram United	5–1	Phitsanulok	Buriram
18:00 UTC+7	Jajá 17', 44'; Seul-ki 45+1'; Supachok 56'; Diogo 90'	Report	Diarra Aboubacar Sidick 59'; Itthipol Chanpangngoen (yellow card) 67'	Stadium: I-Mobile Stadium; Attendance: 5,088; Referee: Ketdamrong Khemthong; Man of the Match: Go Seul-ki (Buriram United)

27 September 2017 Third Round	Bangkok Glass	0–2	Buriram United	Thanyaburi, Pathum Thani
19:00 UTC+7	Piyachanok (yellow card) 16'; Ariel Rodríguez (yellow card) 41'; Surachat (yellow card) 51'; Peerapong (yellow card) 66'; Tassanapong (yellow card) 90+2'	Report	Diogo 11', 90+1', (yellow card) 21'	Stadium: Leo Stadium; Attendance: 4,023; Referee: Mongkolchai Pechsri

18 October 2017 Quarter-finals	Chiangrai United	1–0	Buriram United	Chiang Rai
19:00 UTC+7	Shinnaphat (yellow card) 71'; Felipe 81', (yellow card) 81'; Vander Luiz (yellow card) 89'	Report	Bastos (yellow card) 16'; Suchao (yellow card) 49'; Chitipat (yellow card) 60'; Narubadin (yellow card) 90'	Stadium: Singha Stadium; Attendance: 6,029; Referee: Sivakorn Pu-udom; Man of the Match: Felipe Azevedo (Chiangrai United)

=== League Cup ===
26 July 2017 First Round	Chainat Hornbill	1–2	Buriram United	Chai Nat
19:00 UTC+7	Chatchai 8'; Pongolle (yellow card) 38'; Jong-oh (yellow card) 66'; Diego Silva (yellow card) 81'	Report	Bastos 25'; Narubadin (yellow card) 36'; Jajá 86'; Sasalak (yellow card) 90'	Stadium: Khao Plong Stadium; Attendance: 2,760; Referee: Noppadech Muangngam; Man of the Match: Jakson Avelino Coelho (Buriram United)

1 October 2017 Second Round	Chonburi	1−1 (a.e.t.) (4−5 p)	Buriram United	Mueang Chonburi, Chonburi
19:00 UTC+7	Tatchanon (yellow card) 27'; Noppanon (yellow card) 68'; Suttinan (yellow card) 74'; Nurul 86'; Diakité (yellow card) 118'	Report	Jajá 19'; Suchao (yellow card) 34'; Korrakot (yellow card) 59'; Diogo (yellow card) 77'	Stadium: Chonburi Stadium; Attendance: 6,785; Referee: Sivakorn Pu-udom; Man of the Match: Nurul Sriyankem (Chonburi)
	Penalties
	Worachit (penalty scored); Thiago (penalty scored); Diakité (penalty missed); Nakano (penalty scored); Kritsada (penalty scored)		(penalty scored) Diogo; (penalty scored) Seul-ki; (penalty scored) Jakkaphan; (penalty scored) Siwarak; (penalty scored) Jajá

11 October 2017 Quarter-finals	Buriram United	0–2	SCG Muangthong United	Buriram
18:00 UTC+7	Diogo (yellow card) 74'	Report	Theerathon (yellow card) 33', (goal) 69'; Assumpção 57'	Stadium: I-Mobile Stadium; Attendance: 29,875; Referee: Phumrin Khamruen; Man of the Match: Heberty Fernandes (Muangthong Unite)

== Statistics ==
=== Top scorers ===
The list is sorted by shirt number when total goals are equal.

Left club during season

Rnk	Pos	No.	Player	Thai League T1	FA Cup	League Cup	Mekong Club Championship	Total
1	FW	50	(Brazil) Jakson Avelino Coelho	34	3	2	0	39
2	FW	40	(Brazil) Diogo Luís Santo	26	3	0	1	30
3	MF	19	(Thailand) Supachok Sarachat	7	1	0	0	8
4	MF	7	(South Korea) Go Seul-ki	3	1	0	1	5
4	MF	60	(Brazil) Rafael Bastos	4	0	1	0	5
6	MF	10	(Thailand) Jakkaphan Kaewprom	4	0	0	0	4
7	MF	8	(Thailand) Suchao Nuchnum	2	0	0	0	2
8	DF	3	(Thailand) Pansa Hemviboon	1	0	0	0	1
8	DF	5	(Venezuela) Andrés Túñez	1	0	0	0	1
8	MF	15	(Thailand) Bodin Phala	1	0	0	0	1
8	DF	23	(Iceland) Sölvi Ottesen	1	0	0	0	1
8	FW	34	(Thailand) Anon Amornlerdsak	1	0	0	0	1
Total				85	8	3	2	98

Last updated: 18 November 2017.
Source: Thai League T1

=== Clean sheets ===
The list is sorted by shirt number when total appearances are equal.

Rnk	No.	Player	Apps	Thai League T1	FA Cup	League Cup	Mekong Club Championship	Total
1	1	(Thailand) Siwarak Tedsungnoen	42	19	2	0	1	22
2	29	(Thailand) Yotsapon Teangdar	1	0	0	0	0	0
Total				19	2	0	1	22

Last updated: 18 November 2017.
Source: Thai League T1

=== Summary ===
Games played	43 (34 Thai League T1) (4 FA Cup) (3 League Cup) (2 Mekong Club Championship)
Games won	32 (27 Thai League T1) (3 FA Cup) (1 League Cup) (1 Mekong Club Championship)
Games drawn	6 (5 Thai League T1) (1 League Cup (in 90 minutes))
Games lost	5 (2 Thai League T1) (1 FA Cup) (1 League Cup) (1 Mekong Club Championship)
Goals scored	98 (85 Thai League T1) (8 FA Cup) (3 League Cup) (2 Mekong Club Championship)
Goals conceded	29 (22 Thai League T1) (2 FA Cup) (4 League Cup) (1 Mekong Club Championship)
Goal difference	+69 (+63 Thai League T1) (+6 FA Cup) (–1 League Cup) (+1 Mekong Club Championship)
Clean sheets	22 (19 Thai League T1) (2 FA Cup) (0 League Cup) (1 Mekong Club Championship)
Yellow cards	76 (60 Thai League T1) (7 FA Cup) (6 League Cup) (3 Mekong Club Championship)
Red cards	1 (1 Thai League T1)
Top scorer	(Brazil) Jajá Coelho (39 goals)
Winning Percentage	Overall: 32/43 (74.42%)

Last updated: 18 November 2017.
Source: Competitions

== Home attendance ==
Match no.	Date	Opponent (Score)	Competition	Attendance	References
1	12 February 2017	Chonburi (2–2)	Thai League T1	29,891	
2	25 February 2017	Pattaya United (2–0)	Thai League T1	10,398	
3	8 March 2017	Nakhon Ratchasima (4–0)	Thai League T1	10,509	
4	3 April 2017	SCG Muangthong United (2–0)	Thai League T1	32,600	
5	18 April 2017	Super Power Samut Prakan (3–0)	Thai League T1	8,896	
6	29 April 2017	Sisaket (3–0)	Thai League T1	12,681	
7	7 May 2017	Ratchaburi Mitr Phol (3–4)	Thai League T1	9,397	
8	17 May 2017	Suphanburi (3–0)	Thai League T1	8,316	
9	27 May 2017	Bangkok United (2–1)	Thai League T1	15,123	
10	17 June 2017	Navy (2–0)	Thai League T1	8,467	
11	28 June 2017	Thai Honda Ladkrabang (2–0)	Thai League T1	9,356	
12	5 July 2017	Port (1–0)	Thai League T1	14,725	
13	29 July 2017	Ubon UMT United (4–0)	Thai League T1	14,189	
14	2 August 2017	Phitsanulok (5–1)	FA Cup	5,088	
15	10 September 2017	Chiangrai United (1–0)	Thai League T1	15,649	
16	20 September 2017	Bangkok Glass (1–0)	Thai League T1	10,313	
17	11 October 2017	SCG Muangthong United (0–2)	League Cup	29,875	
18	14 October 2017	Sukhothai (5–2)	Thai League T1	9,860	
19	8 November 2017	BEC Tero Sasana (4–0)	Thai League T1	15,767	
