= 2017 Thailand Champions Cup =

SCG Muangthong United	Sukhothai
5	0
- Date: 22 January 2017
- Venue: Supachalasai Stadium, Bangkok
- Man of the Match: Cleiton Silva
- Referee: Pummarin Khamruen (Thailand)
- Weather: partly cloudy 29 °C (84 °F) humidity 17%

The 2017 Thailand Champions Cup was the first Thailand Champions Cup, an annual football match contested by the winners of the previous season's Thai League 1 and Thai FA Cup competitions. The match was played at Supachalasai Stadium, Bangkok and contested by 2016 Thai League T1 champions SCG Muangthong United, and Sukhothai as the champions of the 2016 Thai FA Cup.

== Qualified teams ==
Team	Qualification	Qualified date	Participation
SCG Muangthong United	Winners of the 2016 Thai League T1	25 September 2016	1st
Sukhothai	Winners of the 2016 Thai FA Cup	2 November 2016	1st

== Match ==
=== Details ===
22 January 2017
19:00 UTC+7

SCG Muangthong United	5 – 0	Sukhothai
Xisco 22'; Cleiton 40', 58'; Sarach 56'; Teerasil 85'	Report; Highlight

Supachalasai Stadium, Bangkok
Referee: Pummarin Khamruen (Thailand)

SCG Muangthong United	Sukhothai

Lineups:
GK	1	(Thailand) Kawin Thamsatchanan
DF	3	(Thailand) Theerathon Bunmathan
DF	4	(Spain) Mario Abrante
DF	5	(Japan) Naoaki Aoyama
DF	19	(Thailand) Tristan Do
MF	6	(Thailand) Sarach Yooyen	56'
MF	18	(Thailand) Chanathip Songkrasin			(substituted off) 73'
MF	34	(Thailand) Wattana Playnum
FW	9	(Spain) Xisco Jiménez	22'		(substituted off) 73'
FW	10	(Thailand) Teerasil Dangda (c)	85'
FW	23	(Brazil) Cleiton Silva	40', 58'	(yellow card) 62'	(substituted off) 82'
Substitutes:
GK	28	(Thailand) Prasit Padungchok
DF	2	(Thailand) Peerapat Notchaiya			(substituted on) 73'
DF	25	(Thailand) Adison Promrak
DF	26	(Thailand) Suphan Thongsong
MF	13	(Thailand) Ratchapol Nawanno
MF	16	(Thailand) Sanukran Thinjom			(substituted on) 82'
MF	20	(Thailand) Wongsakorn Chaikultewin
MF	22	(Thailand) Mongkol Tossakrai			(substituted on) 73'
MF	33	(Thailand) Pitakpong Kulasuwan
Head Coach:
(Thailand) Totchtawan Sripan

Lineups:
GK	35	(Thailand) Pairot Eiammak
DF	4	(Japan) Hiromichi Katano		(substituted off) 59'
DF	5	(Thailand) Yuttapong Srilakorn (c)
DF	7	(Thailand) Phontakorn Thosanthiah	(yellow card) 62'
DF	13	(Thailand) Piyarat Lajungreed	(yellow card) 71'
MF	10	(Madagascar) John Baggio	(yellow card) 12'
MF	25	(Thailand) Sakdarin Mingsamorn
MF	28	(Thailand) Pichit Jaibun		(substituted off) 85'
MF	34	(Thailand) Lursan Thiamrat	(yellow card) 48'	(substituted off) 72'
FW	9	(Montenegro) Admir Adrović
FW	27	(Ivory Coast) Bireme Diouf	(yellow card) 71'
Substitutes:
GK	15	(Thailand) Yutthapoom Srichai
DF	6	(Thailand) Watcharapon Changkleungmoh
DF	31	(Thailand) Chompoo Sangpo
MF	8	(Thailand) Anucha Suksai		(substituted on) 85'
MF	19	(Thailand) Athit Wisetsilp
MF	20	(Kyrgyzstan) Anton Zemlianukhin		(substituted on) 59'
MF	37	(Thailand) Weerasak Gayasith		(substituted on) 72'
FW	17	(Thailand) Kongnathichai Boonma
FW	40	(Thailand) Chettha Kokkaew
Head Coach:
(Thailand) Somchai Makmool

Assistant referees:
(Thailand) Pattarapong Kusathit
(Thailand) Rawut Nakarit
Fourth official:
(Thailand) Chaireag Ngamsom
Match Commissioner:
(Thailand) Paiboon Uyapo
Referee Assessor:
(Thailand) Pirom Un-prasert
General Coordinator:
(Thailand) Ekapol Polnavee

MATCH RULES

- 90 minutes.
- Penalty shoot-out if necessary.
- Maximum of three substitutions.

== Winner ==
2017 Thailand Champions Cup
winners

First title

== See also ==
- 2017 Thai League
- 2017 Thai League 2
- 2017 Thai League 3
- 2017 Thai League 4
- 2017 Thailand Amateur League
- 2017 Thai FA Cup
- 2017 Thai League Cup
