= 2021–22 Nongbua Pitchaya F.C. season =

Nongbua Pitchaya
2021–22 season
- Chairman: Suthep Poomongkolsuriya
- Manager: Thawatchai Damrong-Ongtrakul
- Stadium: Pitchaya Stadium, Nong Bua Lamphu, Thailand
- Thai League T1: -
- Thai FA Cup: -
- Thai League Cup: -
- Top goalscorer: League: Hamilton Soares (10); All: Hamilton Soares (10)
Home colours	Away colours	Third colours

The 2021–22 season is Nongbua Pitchaya's 12th season in existence and the first season in Thai League 1, the top tier of Thai football. In this season, Nongbua Pitchaya competes in 3 competitions which consisted of the Thai League, FA Cup, and League Cup.

The season was supposed to start on 31 July 2021 and concluded on 21 May 2022. Then, due to the situation of the COVID-19 pandemic is still severe, FA Thailand decided to postpone the season to start on 13 August 2021 instead. However, as it stands on 23 July 2021, the COVID-19's situation is getting even worse. Therefore, FA Thailand decided to postpone the opening day for the second time to start on 3 September 2021.

== Squad ==
As of 3 January 2022

Squad No.	Name	Nationality
Goalkeepers
1	Ittikorn Karnsang	(Thailand)
15	Kittikun Jamsuwan	(Thailand)
20	Nattapong Khajohnmalee	(Thailand)
32	Thanakit Auttharak	(Thailand)
99	Apisit Thuraphon	(Thailand)
Defenders
2	Rakpong Chumuang	(Thailand)
4	Airton	(Brazil)
5	Yuttapong Srilakorn (Captain)	(Thailand)
12	Amani Aguinaldo	(Philippines)
21	Sathaporn Daengsee	(Thailand)
33	Prayad Ponphud	(Thailand)
36	Apisit Saenseekammuan	(Thailand)
Midfielders
7	Lursan Thiamrat	(Thailand)
8	Pansiri Sukhunee	(Thailand)
14	Nuttawut Khamrin	(Thailand)
17	Chatchai Jiakklang	(Thailand)
19	Wichitchai Chauyseenual	(Thailand)
23	Thawatchai Aocharod	(Thailand)
27	Iain Ramsay	(Philippines)
35	Tassanapong Muaddarak	(Thailand)
44	Sakda Nonpakdee	(Thailand)
Forwards
9	Apiwat Pengprakon	(Thailand)
13	Warakorn Thongbai	(Thailand)
18	Kittipong Wongma	(Thailand)
25	Hamilton Soares	(Brazil)
30	Yod Chanthawong	(Thailand)
37	Barros Tardeli	(Brazil)
88	Jiraphan Phasukhan	(Thailand)
93	Mahmoud Eid	(Palestine)
Players loaned out / left during season
63	Athibordee Atirat	(Thailand)
10	Lidor Cohen	(Israel)
6	Mahan Rahmani	(Iran)
11	Kritsana Kasemkulvilai	(Thailand)
3	Anisong Chareantham	(Thailand)

== Transfer ==
=== Pre-season transfer ===
==== In ====
Position	Player	Transferred from	Ref
DF	(Thailand) Sathaporn Daengsee	(Thailand) Trat F.C.	Free
DF	(Philippines) Amani Aguinaldo	(Thailand) Trat F.C.	Undisclosed
DF	(Thailand) Nattapong Phephat	(Thailand) Suphanburi F.C.	Undisclosed
DF	(Brazil) Airton	(Brazil) Avaí FC	Undisclosed
FW	(Brazil) Hamilton Soares	(Kuwait) Kazma SC	Undisclosed
MF	(Israel) Lidor Cohen	(Israel) Hapoel Tel Aviv F.C.	Undisclosed
MF	(Thailand) Tassanapong Muaddarak	(Thailand) Chiangmai F.C.	Undisclosed
MF	(Iran) Mahan Rahmani	(Iran) Mes Kerman F.C.	Undisclosed
FW	(Thailand) Jiraphan Phasukhan	(Thailand) Nakhon Pathom United F.C.	Undisclosed
MF	(Philippines) Iain Ramsay	(Thailand) PT Prachuap F.C.	Undisclosed

==== Loan In ====
Position	Player	Transferred from	Ref
FW	(Thailand) Warakorn Thongbai	(Thailand) Chonburi F.C.	Season loan
DF	(Thailand) Athibordee Atirat	(Thailand) BG Pathum United F.C.	Season loan (Note: Loan was recalled by BG Pathum United)

==== Out ====
Position	Player	Transferred To	Ref
DF	(Thailand) Pornthep Chankai	(Thailand) Sukhothai F.C.	Undisclosed
GK	(Thailand) Teerath Nakchamnarn	(Thailand) Khon Kaen United F.C.	Undisclosed
FW	(Brazil) Valdomiro Soares	Unattached (Note: Later joined Trat)	End of contract
FW	(Thailand) Kansit Premthanakul	(Thailand) Trat F.C.	Free
DF	(Thailand) Thaned Benyapad	(Thailand) Nakhon Si United F.C.	Undisclosed
DF	(Thailand) Sakdarin Mingsamorn	(Thailand) Trat F.C.	Undisclosed
DF	(Thailand) Nattapong Phephat	(Thailand) MH Khon Surat City F.C.	Undisclosed

==== Loan Out ====
Position	Player	Transferred To	Ref

=== Mid-season transfer ===
==== In ====
Position	Player	Transferred from	Ref
FW	(Brazil) Barros Tardeli	(South Korea) Suwon FC	Undisclosed
FW	(Palestine) Mahmoud Eid	(Qatar) Mesaimeer SC	Undisclosed
GK	(Thailand) Ittikorn Karnsang	(Thailand) Lampang F.C.	Undisclosed

==== Loan In ====
Position	Player	Transferred from	Ref

==== Out ====
Position	Player	Transferred To	Ref
MF	(Israel) Lidor Cohen	Unattached	Contract terminated
MF	(Iran) Mahan Rahmani	Unattached	Contract terminated
DF	(Thailand) Anisong Chareantham	(Thailand) Lampang F.C.	Undisclosed
MF	(Thailand) Kritsana Kasemkulvilai	(Thailand) Lampang F.C.	Undisclosed

==== Loan Out ====
Position	Player	Transferred To	Ref

== Competitions ==
=== Overview ===
Competition	First match	Last match	Starting round	Record							
Competition	First match	Last match	Starting round	Pld	W	D	L	GF	GA	GD	Win %
Thai League	3 September 2021	21 May 2022	Matchday 1	17	7	4	6	23	20	+3	41.18
FA Cup	27 October 2021		First Round	2	2	0	0	10	1	+9	100.00
League Cup	12 January 2022		First Round	1	1	0	0	2	1	+1	100.00
Total				20	10	4	6	35	22	+13	50.00

Last updated: 15 January 2022
Source: Competitions

=== Thai League 1 ===
==== League table ====
Pos	Team	Pld	W	D	L	GF	GA	GD	Pts
4	Muangthong United	30	13	10	7	46	35	+11	49
5	Chiangrai United	30	13	8	9	33	35	−2	47
6	Nongbua Pitchaya	30	13	8	9	42	35	+7	47
7	Chonburi	30	12	8	10	50	40	+10	44
8	Port	30	11	6	13	41	37	+4	39

Updated to match(es) played on 4 May 2022. Source: Thai League
Rules for classification: 1) Points; 2) Head-to-head points; 3) Head-to-head goals difference; 4) Head-to-head goals scored; 5) Overall goals difference; 6) Overall goals scored; 7) Fair play points; 8) Play-off without extra time;).

==== Results summary ====
Overall								Home						Away					
Pld	W	D	L	GF	GA	GD	Pts	W	D	L	GF	GA	GD	W	D	L	GF	GA	GD
17	7	4	6	23	20	+3	25	7	0	3	16	9	+7	0	4	3	7	11	−4

==== Results by matchday ====
Matchday	1	2	3	4	5	6	7	8	9	10	11	12	13	14	15	16	17	18
Ground	H	H	A	H	A	H	A	H	A	H	A	H	H	A	H	A	H	A
Result	W	L	L	W	D	L	L	W	D	W	D	W	W	L	L	D	W	
Position	1	6	10	10	10	12	13	10	11	9	9	8	7	8	8	8		

A = Away; H = Home; W = Win; D = Draw; L = Loss

==== Matches ====
Win Draw Loss

3 September 2021 1	Nongbua Pitchaya	2-0	Nakhon Ratchasima	Nong Bua Lamphu
	Hamilton 39' 43'			Stadium: Pitchaya Stadium; Attendance: 418; Referee: Sahapop Sriboonlue

12 September 2021 2	Nongbua Pitchaya	0-1	Samut Prakan City	Nong Bua Lamphu
			Aris 35'	Stadium: Pitchaya Stadium; Attendance: 463; Referee: Wiwat Jumpaoon

19 September 2021 3	Chonburi	3-1	Nongbua Pitchaya	Chonburi
	Dennis 21' 45+2' (pen.); Settawut 84'		Rahmani 12'	Stadium: Chonburi Stadium; Attendance: 0 Referee: Niwat Insa-ard

2 October 2021 4	Nongbua Pitchaya	1-0	Police Tero	Nong Bua Lamphu
	Hamilton 24'			Stadium: Pitchaya Stadium; Attendance: 462; Referee: Tastarawut Khantavichai

5 October 2021 5	Muangthong United	1-1	Nongbua Pitchaya	Nonthaburi
	Mirzaev 14' (pen.)		Hamilton 4' (pen.)	Stadium: Thunderdome Stadium; Attendance: 1,092; Referee: Songkran Bunmeekiart

9 October 2021 6	Nongbua Pitchaya	1-2	Leo Chiangrai United	Nong Bua Lamphu
	Hamilton 49'		Felipe Amorim 1'; Chotipat 63'	Stadium: Pitchaya Stadium; Attendance: 849; Referee: Warintorn Sassadee

16 October 2021 7	Khon Kaen United	1-0	Nongbua Pitchaya	Khon Kaen
	Ibson 49'			Stadium: Khon Kaen Stadium; Attendance: 1,548; Referee: Panumas Phansamo

24 October 2021 8	Nongbua Pitchaya	2-1	Suphanburi	Nong Bua Lamphu
	Hamilton 78'; Yod 85'		Reichelt 9' (pen.)	Stadium: Pitchaya Stadium; Attendance: 416; Referee: Noppadet Mangngam

31 October 2021 9	Bangkok United	1-1	Nongbua Pitchaya	Pathum Thani
	Pansiri 63' (o.g.)		Hamilton 71'	Stadium: Thammasat Stadium; Attendance: 0 Referee: Sahapop Sriboonlue

6 November 2021 10	Nongbua Pitchaya	3-1	Chiangmai United	Nong Bua Lamphu
	Jiraphan 78'; Hamilton 69' (pen.) 90+3'		Saharat 71'	Stadium: Pitchaya Stadium; Attendance: 731; Referee: Akom Charoensuk

9 November 2021 11	Buriram United	0-0	Nongbua Pitchaya	Buriram
			Chatchai (red card) 74'	Stadium: Chang Arena; Attendance: 6,065; Referee: Natee Choosuwan

13 November 2021 12	Nongbua Pitchaya	1-0	PT Prachuap	Nong Bua Lamphu
	Airton 56'			Stadium: Pitchaya Stadium; Attendance: 1,009; Referee: Sarayut Jakngoen

17 November 2021 13	Nongbua Pitchaya	3-1	BG Pathum United	Nong Bua Lamphu
	Lursan 48'; Irfan 62' (o.g.); Airton 90+2'		Chaowat 15'	Stadium: Pitchaya Stadium; Attendance: 1,772; Referee: Kotchapoom Meesridaecha

21 November 2021 14	Ratchaburi Mitr Phol	3-2	Nongbua Pitchaya	Ratchaburi
	Derley 45+1' 53' 79'		Hamilton 15'; Apiwat 87'	Stadium: Mitr Phol Stadium; Attendance: 1,632; Referee: Sahapop Sriboonlue

27 November 2021 15	Nongbua Pitchaya	0-1	Port	Nong Bua Lamphu
	Airton (red card) 89'		Sergio Suárez 38'	Stadium: Pitchaya Stadium; Attendance: 1,854; Referee: Wiwat Jumpaoon

8 January 2022 16	Samut Prakan City	2-2	Nongbua Pitchaya	Samut Prakan
	Yuto 7'; Chatri 24'		Hamilton 46'; Tardeli 58'	Stadium: Samut Prakarn SAT Stadium; Attendance: 590; Referee: Songkran Bunmeekiart

15 January 2022 17	Nongbua Pitchaya	3-2	Chonburi	Nong Bua Lamphu
	Eid 12'; Tardeli 36'; Tassanapong 89'		Phitak 16'; Yoo 65'	Stadium: Pitchaya Stadium; Attendance: 2,124; Referee: Winat Phophat

22 January 2022 18	BG Pathum United	v	Nongbua Pitchaya	Pathum Thani
				Stadium: BG Stadium

=== Thai FA Cup ===
==== Matches ====
Win Draw Loss

27 October 2021 First Round	Chattrakan City (TA)	0-6	Nongbua Pitchaya (T1)	Phitsanulok
			Apiwat 13' (pen.) 59' 81'; Kritsana 37'; Warakorn 87' 90+1'	Stadium: H2H Sport Stadium; Attendance: 126; Referee: Kristin Saisombat

24 November 2021 Second Round	Nongbua Pitchaya (T1)	4-1	Kasem Bundit University (T3)	Nong Bua Lamphu
	Apiwat 13' 72' 90+1'; Sakda 80'		Ranieri 5'	Stadium: Pitchaya Stadium; Attendance: 224; Referee: Phairot Bunkamnoed

19 January 2022 Third Round	Lamphun Warriors (T2)	v	Nongbua Pitchaya (T1)	Lamphun
				Stadium: Mae Guang Stadium

=== Thai League Cup ===
==== Matches ====
Win Draw Loss

12 January 2022 First Round	Nakhon Si United (T3)	1-2	Nongbua Pitchaya (T1)	Nakhon Si Thammarat
	Diego 90+4'		Warakorn 14'; Hamilton 69'	Stadium: Nakhon Si Thammarat Province Stadium; Attendance: 1,200; Referee: Phairot Bunkamnoed

Second Round	v

== Team statistics ==
=== Appearances and goals ===
As of 15 January 2022

No.	Pos.	Player	League		FA Cup		League Cup		Total	
No.	Pos.	Player	Apps.	Goals	Apps.	Goals	Apps.	Goals	Apps.	Goals
1	GK	(Thailand) Ittikorn Karnsang	0	0	0	0	1	0	1	0
2	DF	(Thailand) Rakpong Chumuang	2+2	0	2	0	1	0	5+2	0
4	DF	(Brazil) Airton	15	2	0	0	1	0	16	2
5	DF	(Thailand) Yuttapong Srilakorn	15+1	0	1	0	0	0	16+1	0
7	MF	(Thailand) Lursan Thiamrat	14+1	1	0+1	0	0+1	0	14+3	1
8	MF	(Thailand) Pansiri Sukhunee	4+4	0	1	0	1	0	6+4	0
9	FW	(Thailand) Apiwat Pengprakon	2+6	1	2	6	1	0	5+6	7
12	DF	(Philippines) Amani Aguinaldo	5+4	0	0	0	0	0	5+4	0
13	FW	(Thailand) Warakorn Thongbai	1+3	0	2	2	1	1	4+3	3
14	MF	(Thailand) Nuttawut Khamrin	10+3	0	0+1	0	0+1	0	10+5	0
15	GK	(Thailand) Kittikun Jamsuwan	13+1	0	0	0	0	0	13+1	0
17	MF	(Thailand) Chatchai Jiakklang	10+4	0	0	0	1	0	11+4	0
18	FW	(Thailand) Kittipong Wongma	0+4	0	0	0	0	0	0+4	0
19	MF	(Thailand) Wichitchai Chauyseenual	6+4	0	1	0	1	0	8+4	0
20	GK	(Thailand) Nattapong Khajohnmalee	4	0	0	0	0	0	4	0
21	DF	(Thailand) Sathaporn Daengsee	16	0	1	0	1	0	18	0
23	MF	(Thailand) Thawatchai Aocharod	1+11	0	1+1	0	0	0	2+12	0
25	FW	(Brazil) Hamilton Soares	16+1	11	0	0	0+1	1	16+2	12
27	MF	(Philippines) Iain Ramsay	9+2	0	0	0	0	0	9+2	0
30	FW	(Thailand) Yod Chanthawong	3+9	1	1+1	0	1	0	5+10	1
32	GK	(Thailand) Thanakit Auttharak	0	0	2	0	0	0	2	0
33	DF	(Thailand) Prayad Ponphud	0	0	1	0	0	0	1	0
35	MF	(Thailand) Tassanapong Muaddarak	15+1	1	0+1	0	0	0	15+2	1
36	DF	(Thailand) Apisit Saenseekammuan	0+3	0	1+1	0	0	0	1+4	0
37	FW	(Brazil) Barros Tardeli	2	2	0	0	0+1	0	2+1	2
44	MF	(Thailand) Sakda Nonpakdee	0	0	1+1	1	0	0	1+1	1
88	FW	(Thailand) Jiraphan Phasukhan	9+3	1	0+1	0	1	0	10+4	1
93	FW	(Palestine) Mahmoud Eid	1+1	1	0	0	0+1	0	1+2	1
99	GK	(Thailand) Apisit Thuraphon	0	0	0+1	0	0	0	0+1	0
Players loaned out / left during season
63	DF	(Thailand) Athibordee Atirat	0+1	0	2	0	0	0	2+1	0
10	MF	(Israel) Lidor Cohen	1	0	0	0	0	0	1	0
6	MF	(Iran) Mahan Rahmani	7	1	1	0	0	0	8	1
3	DF	(Thailand) Anisong Chareantham	2+1	0	0+1	0	0	0	2+2	0
11	MF	(Thailand) Kritsana Kasemkulvilai	4+1	0	2	1	0	0	6+1	1

== Overall summary ==
=== Season summary ===
Games played	20 (17 Thai League, 2 FA Cup, 1 League Cup)
Games won	10 (7 Thai League, 2 FA Cup, 1 League Cup)
Games drawn	4 (4 Thai League, 0 FA Cup, 0 League Cup)
Games lost	6 (6 Thai League, 0 FA Cup, 0 League Cup)
Goals scored	35 (23 Thai League, 10 FA Cup, 2 League Cup)
Goals conceded	22 (20 Thai League, 1 FA Cup, 1 League Cup)
Goal difference	+13
Clean sheets	5 (4 Thai League, 1 FA Cup, 0 League Cup)
Best result	6-0 vs Chattrakan City (27 October 21)
Worst result	1-3 vs Chonburi (19 September 21)
Most appearances	2 players (18)
Top scorer	Hamilton Soares (12)
Points	25

=== Score overview ===
Opposition	Home score	Away score	Double
BG Pathum United	3-1		
Buriram United		0-0	No
Chiangmai United	3-1		
Chonburi	3-2	3-1	No
Khon Kaen United		1-0	No
Leo Chiangrai United	1-2		No
Muangthong United		1-1	No
Nakhon Ratchasima	2-0		
Police Tero	1-0		
Port	0-1		No
PT Prachuap	1-0		
Ratchaburi Mitr Phol		3-2	No
Samut Prakan City	0-1	2-2	No
Suphanburi	2-1		
True Bangkok United		1-1	No
