= Anucha =

- Pronunciation: Thai: [ʔa.nu.t͡ɕʰaː]
- Gender: Male
- Language: Thai

Origin
- Origin: Sanskrit/Pali
- Meaning: younger brother
- Region of origin: Thailand

Anucha is a Thai word of Pali/Sanskrit origin anujā meaning "younger brother". It is also used as a given name. People with the given name Anucha include:

- Anucha Browne Sanders, American former women's basketball player, former executive for the New York Knicks of the NBA
- Anucha Chaiyawong (born 1985), Thai footballer who played for Thailand Premier League side Provincial Electricity Authority FC
- Anucha Chuaysri (born 1979), professional footballer from Thailand
- Anucha Kitpongsri (born 1983), Thai footballer
- Anucha Munjarern (born 1979), Thai futsal player who is futsal's top international goalscorer of all time
- Anucha Nakasai (born 1960), Thai Minister to the Office of the Prime Minister
- Anucha Saengchart (born 1989), better known as Lowcostcosplay, Thai cosplayer
- Anucha Suksai (born 1992), Thai footballer
