= Mahan Rahmani =

Iranian footballer

Personal information
- Full name: Mahan Rahmani Nobarani
- Date of birth: 15 June 1996 (age 30)
- Place of birth: Tehran, Iran
- Height: 1.85 m (6 ft 1 in)
- Position: Midfielder

Team information
- Current team: Aluminium Arak
- Number: 39

Youth career
- 2008–2014: Saipa

Senior career*
Years	Team	Apps	(Gls)
2013–2016	Saipa	20	(0)
2016–2019	Paykan	55	(3)
2020–2021	Mes Kerman	0	(0)
2021	Nongbua Pitchaya	7	(1)
2023–	Aluminium Arak	1	(0)

International career^{‡}
2010–2013	Iran U17	20	(5)
2013–2015	Iran U20	18	(3)
2013–2018	Iran U23	15	(3)
- * Club domestic league appearances and goals as of 1 November 2024 ‡ National team caps and goals as of 22 January 2016

Mahan Rahmani Nobarani (Persian: ماهان رحمانی; born 15 June 1996) is an Iranian football midfielder who plays for Aluminium Arak.

== Club career ==
=== Saipa ===
He started his career with Saipa from youth levels. In July 2013 he joined to first team by Engin Firat. He made his debut for Saipa on 6 April 2014 against Malavan as a substitute for Roozbeh Shahalidoost.

=== Persepolis ===
On 5 July 2016, Rahmani signed with Iranian giants Persepolis.

== Club career statistics ==
As of 15 May 2018.

Club	Division	Season	League		Hazfi Cup		Asia		Total	
Club	Division	Season	Apps	Goals	Apps	Goals	Apps	Goals	Apps	Goals
Saipa	PGPL	2013–14	1	0	0	0	–	–	1	0
Saipa	PGPL	2014–15	8	0	0	0	–	–	8	0
Saipa	PGPL	2015–16	11	0	1	0	–	–	12	0
Paykan	PGPL	2016–17	24	0	1	0	–	–	25	0
Paykan	PGPL	2017–18	15	1	1	0	–	–	16	1
Career Totals			59	1	3	0	0	0	62	1

== International career ==
=== U17 ===
He was part of Iran U–17 in 2012 AFC U-16 Championship.

=== U20 ===
He invited to Iran U–20 by Ali Dousti Mehr to preparation for 2014 AFC U-19 Championship.
