= Lowcost Cosplay =

Thai cosplayer and social media personality

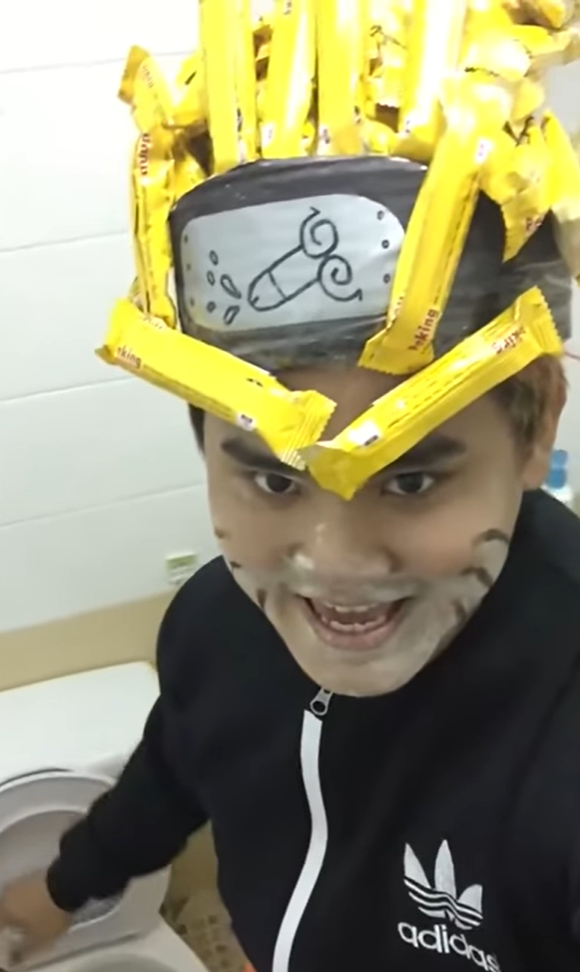
Anucha cosplaying as Naruto Uzumaki

Anucha Saengchart (Thai: อนุชา แสงชาติ; born 1989), nicknamed Cha (Thai: ชา), known online as Lowcost Cosplay or Lonelyman, is a Thai social media personality and cosplayer known for his cheap costumes using household items.

== Biography ==
Anucha was born on November 5, 1989, in Chiang Mai. After graduating secondary school, Anucha worked as a waiter in Chiang Mai. He briefly attended university before dropping out. He later moved to Bangkok to work as an elderly caregiver. One night shift, he posted a photo of himself wearing a red cloth on his back, posing as Leonidas from the movie 300. Surprised at the positive response, he continued to share his spoof cosplay.

Anucha started the Lowcost Cosplay Facebook page in December 2013. He began posting photos of himself utilizing everyday items in his costumes, such as cooking ingredients, towels, and utensils.

Anucha specializes in cosplaying subjects from anime and manga. He has portrayed characters from franchises such as Jojo's Bizarre Adventure, Dragon Ball, and Animal Crossing. By 2020, he had accrued over 2.5 million followers. By November 2022, he had over eight million followers across Instagram and Facebook.
