= Alongkorn Thongjean =

Thai footballer

Personal information
- Date of birth: 12 March 1992 (age 34)
- Place of birth: Thailand
- Height: 1.78 m (5 ft 10 in)
- Position: Right-back

Senior career*
Years	Team	Apps	(Gls)
2016	Sukhothai	8	(0)
2017–2019	Lampang		
2020	Rayong	4	(0)
2020–2021	Lampang		
2021–2022	Saraburi United		
2022	Uthai Thani	7	(0)
- * Club domestic league appearances and goals as of 1 December 2022

Alongkorn Thongjean (Thai: อลงกรณ์ ทองจีน; born 12 March 1992), also known as Arongkorn Thongjeen, is a Thai professional footballer who plays as a right-back.
