= Airton (footballer, born March 1990) =

Brazilian footballer

Personal information
- Full name: Airton Tirabassi
- Date of birth: 12 March 1990 (age 36)
- Place of birth: Boituva, Brazil
- Height: 1.91 m (6 ft 3 in)
- Position: Centre back

Team information
- Current team: PT Prachuap
- Number: 5

Senior career*
Years	Team	Apps	(Gls)
2010	Rio Branco	16	(1)
2011	Guaratinguetá	7	(0)
2012	Rio Branco	23	(1)
2012	Mogi Mirim	2	(0)
2013	CRB	2	(0)
2014	Ituano	6	(0)
2015	XV de Piracicaba	10	(0)
2016	São Bento	1	(0)
2016	→ Luverdense (loan)	8	(1)
2017	Paraná	9	(0)
2017–2021	Avaí	67	(2)
2019	→ Ponte Preta (loan)	23	(0)
2021	→ Guarani (loan)	12	(1)
2021–2022	Nongbua Pitchaya	27	(2)
2022–2023	Port	21	(2)
2023–	PT Prachuap	76	(2)
- * Club domestic league appearances and goals as of 3 May 2026 (UTC)

Airton Tirabassi (born 12 March 1990) is a Brazilian footballer who plays as a centre back for Thai League 1 club PT Prachuap.

== Club career ==
Born in Boituva, Airton started his professional career with Rio Branco in 2010. In the following years, he played for Guaratinguetá, Mogi Mirim and CRB.

In 2014, Airton signed with Ituano and with the club, he went on to win the 2014 Campeonato Paulista. After a stint with XV de Piracicaba, on 10 December 2015, Airton switched to São Bento. On 3 May 2016, Airton joined Luverdense on a loan deal. On 17 June, he scored his first goal for the club in a 1–0 victory over Paraná Clube. He left São Bento on 19 December after having made a single appearance in Campeonato Paulista.

Airton signed with Paraná Clube on 13 January 2017. He featured 15 times for the club and scored one goal in a Copa do Brasil match against Vitória. However, after failing to negotiate with the club about his salary, he did not renew his contract. In May 2017, he moved to Serie A club Avaí. On 18 June, he made his debut for the club in a 1–0 defeat against Vasco da Gama.

On 1 January 2019, Airton moved to Ponte Preta.

== Club statistics ==
As of match played on 24 November 2018

Club	Season	League			Cup		State League		Total	
Club	Season	Division	Apps	Goals	Apps	Goals	Apps	Goals	Apps	Goals
Rio Branco	2010	Paulista A1	—		0	0	16	1	16	1
Guaratinguetá	2011	Série B	3	0	0	0	4	0	7	0
Rio Branco	2012	Paulista A3	—		0	0	23	1	23	1
Mogi Mirim	2012	Série D	2	0	0	0	0	0	2	0
CRB	2013	Série C	0	0	2	0	0	0	2	0
Ituano	2014	Série D	3	0	19	2	3	0	25	2
XV de Piracicaba	2015	Paulista A1	—		0	0	10	0	10	0
São Bento	2016	Série D	0	0	0	0	1	0	1	0
Luverdense (loan)	2016	Série B	8	1	0	0	—		8	1
Paraná	2017	Série B	0	0	8	1	7	0	15	1
Avaí	2017	Série A	5	0	0	0	—		5	0
Avaí	2018	Série B	31	0	2	0	5	0	38	0
Avaí	Total		36	0	2	0	5	0	43	0
Career total			52	1	31	3	69	2	152	6
