= Watchara Krearum =

Thai footballer (born 1986)

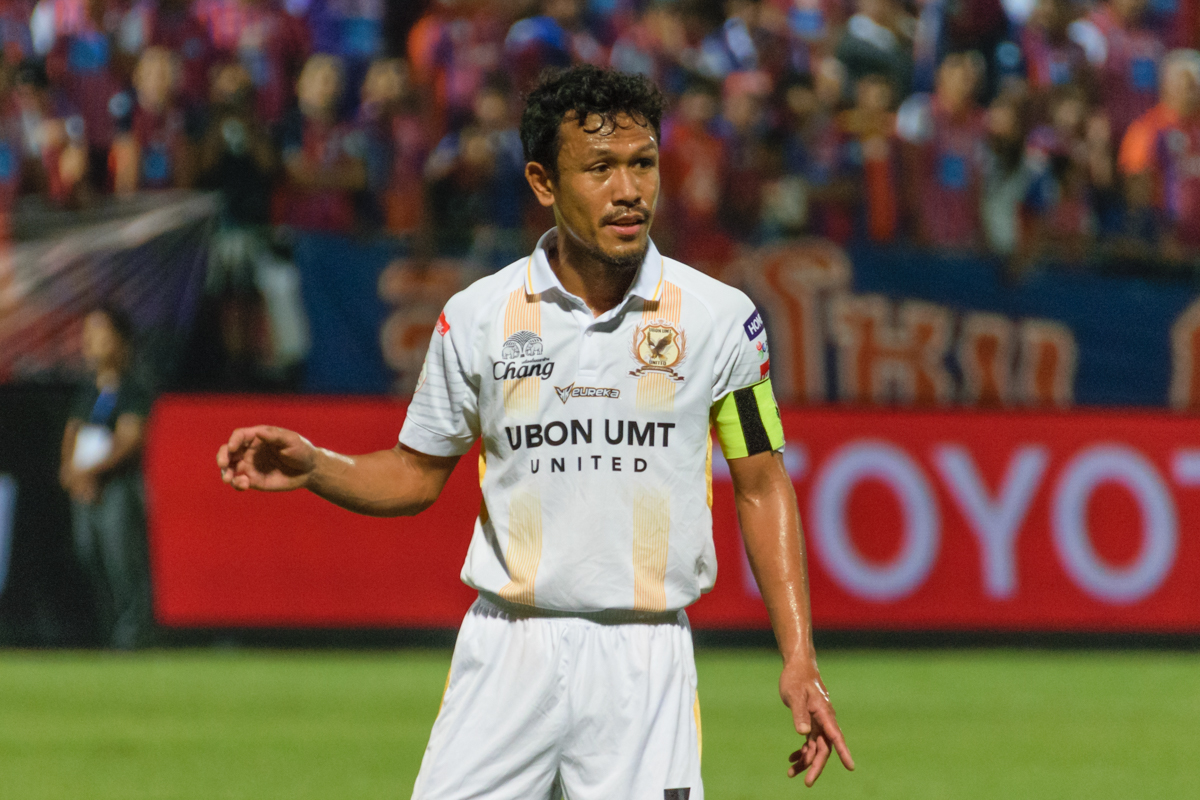

Personal information
- Full name: Watchara Krearum
- Date of birth: 11 May 1986 (age 40)
- Place of birth: Buriram, Thailand
- Height: 1.65 m (5 ft 5 in)
- Position: Defensive midfielder

Senior career*
Years	Team	Apps	(Gls)
2009–2010	Buriram		
2011–2012	Phatthalung		
2013	Angthong		
2013–2014	Phuket		
2014	Paknampho NSRU		
2015–2018	Ubon UMT United	45	(0)
2018	Udon Thani	3	(0)
- * Club domestic league appearances and goals

Watchara Krearum (Thai: วัชระ เกรียรัมย์, born May 11, 1986) simply known as Tum or Sieng (Thai: ตั้ม / เซียง). He is a retired professional footballer from Buriram, Thailand.

== Honor ==
=== Ubon UMT United ===
- Regional League Division 2:
  - Winners : 2015
- Regional League North-East Division
  - Runner-up : 2015

=== Krabi F.C. ===
- Regional League Division 2
  - Third place :2011
- Regional League South Division
  - Runner-up : 2011

=== Buriram F.C. ===
- Regional League Division 2
  - Winners :2010
- Regional League North-East Division
  - Runner-up :2010
