= Anisong Chareantham =

Thai footballer (born 1988)

Personal information
- Full name: Anisong Chareantham
- Date of birth: 12 April 1988 (age 38)
- Place of birth: Chiang Mai, Thailand
- Height: 1.79 m (5 ft 10 1/2 in)
- Position: Centre-back

Team information
- Current team: Udon United
- Number: 4

Senior career*
Years	Team	Apps	(Gls)
2017	Port	2	(0)
2018–2021	Nongbua Pitchaya	50	(2)
2022–2023	Lampang	21	(0)
2023–2024	Nongbua Pitchaya	12	(0)
2024–	Udon United	0	(0)
- * Club domestic league appearances and goals

Anisong Chareantham (Thai: อานิสงส์ เจริญธรรม; born April 12, 1988) is a Thai professional footballer who plays as a centre-back for Thai League 3 club Udon United.

== Honours ==
Nongbua Pitchaya

- Thai League 2: 2020–21
