= Nuttawut Khamrin =

Thai footballer (born 1991)

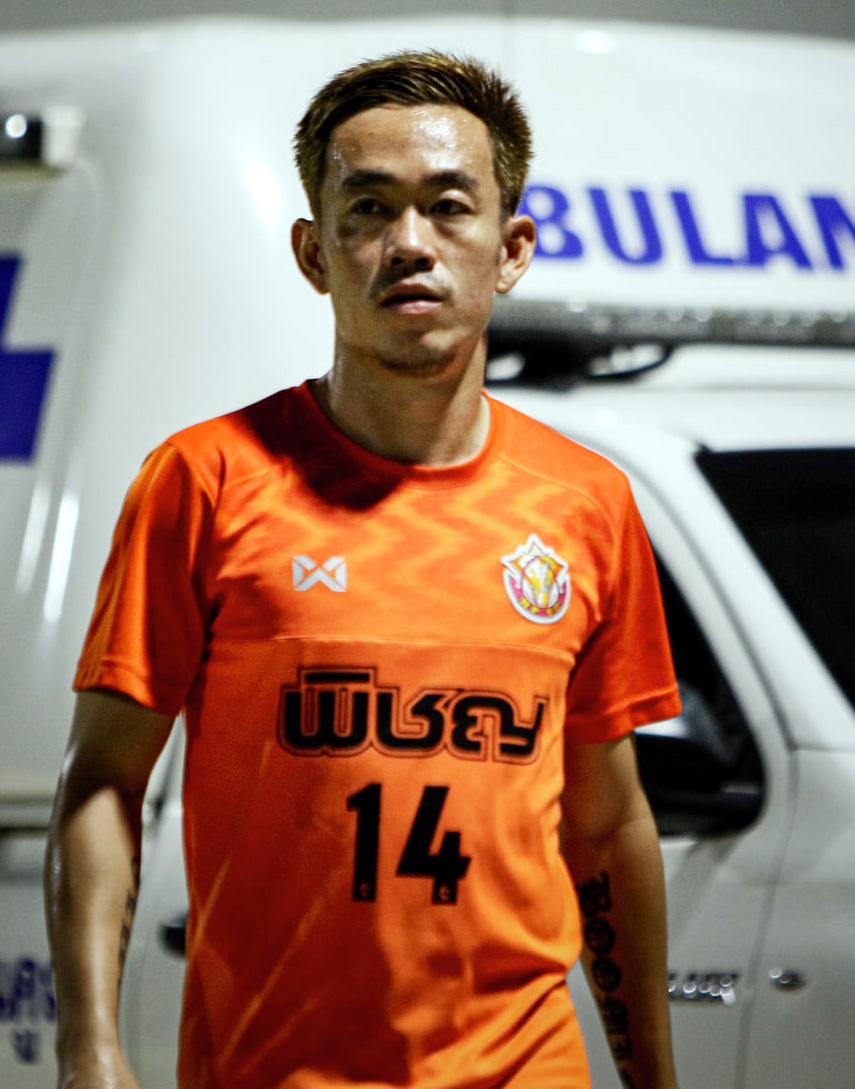
- Khamrin in 2021

Personal information
- Full name: Nuttawut Khamrin
- Date of birth: 27 March 1991 (age 35)
- Place of birth: Chiang Mai, Thailand
- Height: 1.72 m (5 ft 8 in)
- Positions: Right winger; midfielder

Team information
- Current team: Nongbua Pitchaya
- Number: 14

Youth career
- 2009–2010: Chonburi

Senior career*
Years	Team	Apps	(Gls)
2010–2012	Rayong	26	(4)
2013	Army United	0	(0)
2013	→ Rayong (loan)	14	(0)
2013	Osotspa	1	(0)
2014–2016	Sisaket	69	(0)
2017	Sukhothai	29	(1)
2018–	Nongbua Pitchaya	47	(0)

International career^{‡}
2010	Thailand U19	3	(0)
- * Club domestic league appearances and goals as of 01:08, 17 September 2017 (UTC) ‡ National team caps and goals as of October 1, 2016

Nuttawut Khamrin (Thai: ณัฐวุฒิ คำรินทร์, born March 27, 1991) is a Thai professional footballer who plays as a right winger or a midfielder for Thai League 2 club Nongbua Pitchaya.

== Honour ==
Nongbua Pitchaya

- Thai League 2 champions: 2020–21
