= Kabfah Boonmatoon =

Thai footballer (born 1987)

Personal information
- Full name: Kabfah Boonmatoon
- Date of birth: 12 March 1987 (age 39)
- Place of birth: Maha Sarakham, Thailand
- Height: 1.75 m (5 ft 9 in)
- Position: Attacking midfielder

Team information
- Current team: Ayutthaya United
- Number: 24

Youth career
- 2006–2007: Osotspa Saraburi

Senior career*
Years	Team	Apps	(Gls)
2008–2010	Osotspa Saraburi	52	(7)
2011	Muangthong United	2	(0)
2011–2012	Chainat	14	(2)
2013–2015	Osotspa Saraburi	46	(5)
2015	→ Sisaket (loan)	28	(2)
2016	Ubon UMT United	10	(2)
2017–2020	Sukhothai	84	(12)
2021–2022	Chiangmai United	17	(2)
2022–	Ayutthaya United	16	(1)

International career
2009–2010	Thailand U23	6	(0)
2009	Thailand	1	(0)
- * Club domestic league appearances and goals as of 30 April 2023

Kabfah Boonmatoon (Thai: คัพฟ้า บุญมาตุ่น, born March 12, 1987), simply known as Fah (Thai: ฟ้า), is a Thai retired professional footballer who plays as an attacking midfielder for Thai League 2 club Ayutthaya United.

== International career ==
In November 2009 he was called up to the Thailand squad for the 2009 Southeast Asian Games.

=== International ===
As of 3 April 2016

National team	Year	Apps	Goals
Thailand	2010	1	0
Thailand	Total	1	0
