= Rodrigo Maranhão =

Brazilian footballer

Personal information
- Full name: Rodrigo Meneses Quintanilha
- Date of birth: December 11, 1992 (age 33)
- Place of birth: Codó, Maranhão, Brazil
- Height: 1.72 m (5 ft 8 in)
- Position: Forward

Team information
- Current team: Lamphun Warriors
- Number: 28

Youth career
- Atlético Goianiense

Senior career*
| Years | Team | Apps | (Gls) |
| 2015 | União Barbarense | 18 | (11) |
| 2015 | Bragantino | 7 | (0) |
| 2016–2017 | Port FC | 31 | (10) |
| 2017 | Sukhothai FC | 14 | (6) |
| 2018 | Zweigen Kanazawa | 31 | (9) |
| 2019 | Bucheon FC | 9 | (0) |
| 2019 | Nongbua Pitchaya | 1 | (0) |
| 2020 | Lampang | 4 | (1) |
| 2020–2021 | Água Santa | 0 | (0) |
| 2021–2023 | Phrae United | 64 | (33) |
| 2023–2025 | Nakhon Si United | 58 | (34) |
| 2025 | Chanthaburi | 16 | (3) |
| 2026 | Trat | 13 | (4) |
| 2026– | Lamphun Warriors | 0 | (0) |
- * Club domestic league appearances and goals as of 9 March 2026

Rodrigo Meneses Quintanilha (born December 11, 1992), known as Rodrigo Maranhão, is a Brazilian football player for Thai League 1 club Lamphun Warriors.

== Career ==
After some experiences between Brazil and Thailand, Rodrigo Maranhão opted to sign for Zweigen Kanazawa in December 2017.

On the 10th of June 2021 Rodrigo Maranhão signed for Phrae United He finished the first leg of the 2022/23 Thai League 2 season as equal third highest goal scorer in the League with 8 goals.

== Club statistics ==
Updated to 28 August 2018.

| Club performance | | | League | | Cup | | Total | |
| Season | Club | League | Apps | Goals | Apps | Goals | Apps | Goals |
| Japan | | | League | | Emperor's Cup | | Total | |
|---|---|---|---|---|---|---|---|---|
| 2018 | Zweigen Kanazawa | J2 League | 26 | 8 | 0 | 0 | 26 | 8 |
| Career total | | | 26 | 8 | 0 | 0 | 26 | 8 |
