= Kiattisak Toopkhuntod =

Thai footballer (born 1995)

Personal information
- Full name: Kiattisak Toopkhuntod
- Date of birth: 19 February 1995 (age 31)
- Place of birth: Nakhon Ratchasima, Thailand
- Height: 1.76 m (5 ft 9 1/2 in)
- Position: Centre back

Team information
- Current team: Uttaradit
- Number: 77

Youth career
- 2011–2013: Ratwinit Bangkaeo School

Senior career*
Years	Team	Apps	(Gls)
2014–2015	Samutsongkhram	24	(0)
2016–2019	Sukhothai	9	(0)
2019	→ Kasetsart (loan)	9	(0)
2019–	Uttaradit	78	(0)

International career
2011–2012	Thailand U16	10	(0)
2013–2014	Thailand U19	6	(0)
2014	Thailand U23	3	(0)
- * Club domestic league appearances and goals as of 6 May 2023

Kiattisak Toopkhuntod (Thai: กิตติศักดิ์ ธูปขุนทด, born 19 February 1995) is a Thai professional footballer who plays as a centre back.

== Honours ==
=== International ===
Thailand U-23

- Dubai Cup (1) : 2017
