= Kongnathichai Boonma =

Thai footballer (born 1987)

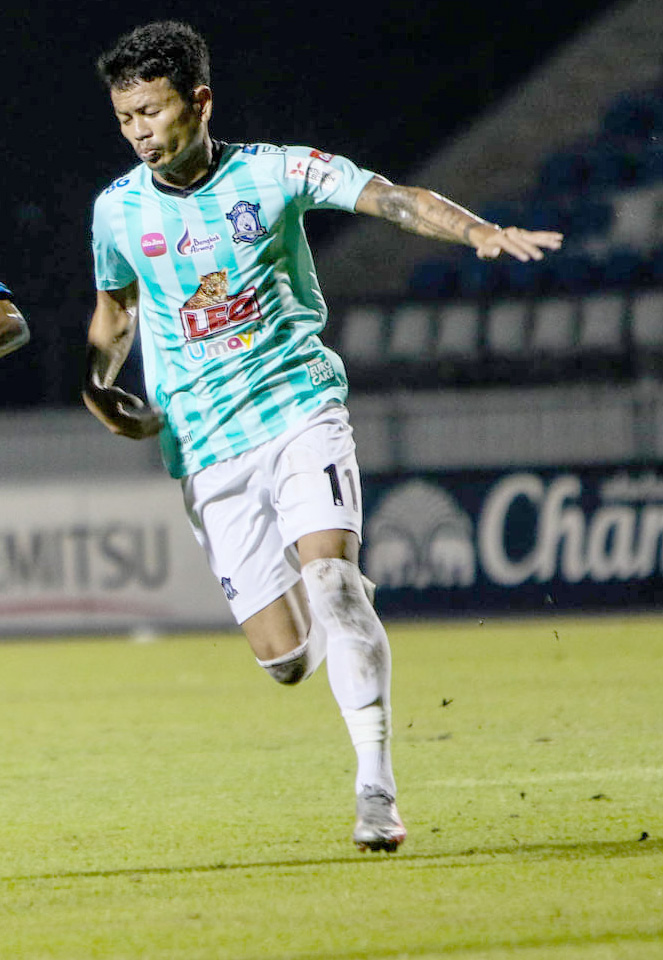

Personal information
- Full name: Kongnathichai Boonma
- Date of birth: 7 March 1987 (age 39)
- Place of birth: Thailand
- Height: 1.76 m (5 ft 9 in)
- Position: Attacking midfielder

Team information
- Current team: Samut Sakhon City

Senior career*
Years	Team	Apps	(Gls)
2016	Prachuap		
2017–2019	Sukhothai	76	(8)
2020–2021	Chiangmai	15	(4)
2021–2024	Nakhon Pathom United	67	(5)
2024	Chainat Hornbill	27	(3)
2025–	Samut Sakhon City	0	(0)
- * Club domestic league appearances and goals as of 30 April 2024

Kongnathichai Boonma (Thai: ก้องนทีชัย บุญมา; born March 7, 1987) is a Thai professional footballer who plays as an attacking midfielder for Thai League 3 club Samut Sakhon City.

== Honour ==
Nakhon Pathom United

- Thai League 2: 2022–23
