= Chompoo Sangpo =

Thai footballer (born 1988)

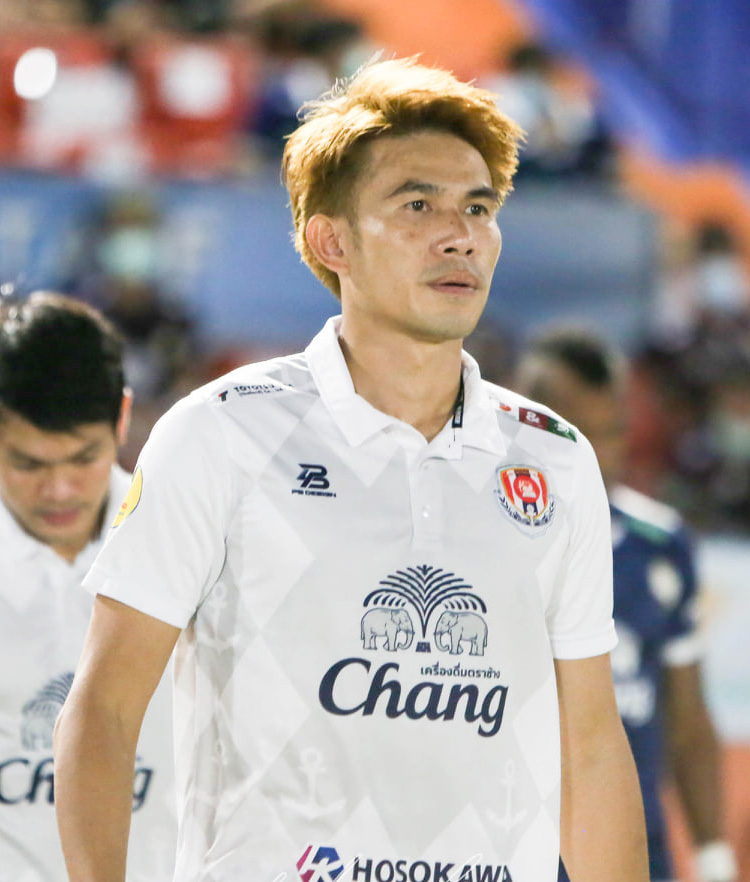
- Navy FC, 2022

Personal information
- Full name: Chompoo Sangpo
- Date of birth: 15 August 1988 (age 38)
- Place of birth: Chonburi, Thailand
- Height: 1.75 m (5 ft 9 in)
- Position: Left back

Team information
- Current team: Phitsanulok Unity
- Number: 35

Youth career
- 2006: Customs Department

Senior career*
Years	Team	Apps	(Gls)
2007	Customs Department	6	(0)
2008	Raj-Vithi	26	(2)
2009	Bangkok United	0	(0)
2009–2010	Buriram PEA		
2010	Buriram	2	
2011–2012	PTT Rayong		
2012–2014	Ayutthaya		
2014	Ang Thong	16	(2)
2015–2016	Sisaket	43	(1)
2017–2020	Sukhothai	37	(1)
2020	Ayutthaya United	9	(0)
2020	Police Tero	2	(0)
2021–2022	Suphanburi	3	(0)
2021–2022	→ Navy (loan)	6	(0)
2022	Nan	8	(0)
2023	Dragon Pathumwan Kanchanaburi	9	(0)
2023	Nakhon Sawan See Khwae City	2	(0)
2023–	Phitsanulok Unity	0	(0)
- * Club domestic league appearances and goals as of 20 May 2023 (UTC)

Chompoo Sangpo (Thai: ชมพู แสงโพธิ์, born August 15, 1988) is a Thai professional footballer.

== Honours ==
=== Club ===
Customs Department

- Thai Division 1 League: 2007

Ayutthaya

- Regional League Division 2: 2012

Dragon Pathumwan Kanchanaburi

- Thai League 3 Western Region: 2022–23
