= Anirut Naiyana =

Thai footballer

Personal information
- Date of birth: 11 April 1996 (age 30)
- Place of birth: Phang Nga, Thailand
- Height: 1.81 m (5 ft 11 1/2 in)
- Position: Goalkeeper

Youth career
- 2014: Suankularb Wittayalai School
- 2015: RSU

Senior career*
Years	Team	Apps	(Gls)
2016	Sukhothai	4	(0)
2021–2022	Phitsanulok	16	(0)
2022–2023	Uthai Thani	7	(0)
2023–2024	Nakhon Si United	7	(0)
2024	Trat	1	(0)
- * Club domestic league appearances and goals as of 22 December 2024

Anirut Naiyana (Thai: อนิรุต นัยนา, born 11 April 1996) is a Thai professional footballer who plays as a goalkeeper.
