= Kitsada Hemvipat =

Thai footballer (born 1984)

Personal information
- Full name: Kitsada Hemvipat
- Date of birth: 19 May 1984 (age 42)
- Place of birth: Khon Kaen, Thailand
- Height: 1.78 m (5 ft 10 in)
- Position: Defensive midfielder

Team information
- Current team: Khon Kaen
- Number: 33

Senior career*
Years	Team	Apps	(Gls)
2011–2012	Khon Kaen		
2013–2015	Chiangrai United	3	(0)
2015	Krabi		
2015–2016	Sukhothai	23	(1)
2016–2019	Nakhon Ratchasima	74	(2)
2020–2022	Khon Kaen United	22	(0)
2022	Udon Thani	3	(0)
2023–	Khon Kaen	10	(1)
- * Club domestic league appearances and goals as of 18 March 2023

Kitsada Hemvipat (Thai: กฤษฎา เหมวิพัฒน์, born May 19, 1984) is a Thai professional footballer who plays as a defensive midfielder for Thai League 3 club Khon Kaen.
