= Renan Marques =

Brazilian footballer

Personal information
- Full name: Renan Augustinho Marques
- Date of birth: 8 March 1983 (age 43)
- Place of birth: Fernandópolis, Brazil
- Height: 1.85 m (6 ft 1 in)
- Position: Striker

Senior career*
Years	Team	Apps	(Gls)
2007	Botafogo-SP	0	(0)
2007	→ Dynamo České Budějovice (loan)	3	(0)
2008	Sichuan FC	22	(11)
2009	Shenzhen Ruby	8	(0)
2009–2010	Santa Clara	0	(0)
2010–2011	Baniyas	0	(0)
2012	Paulista	14	(2)
2012	Jeju United	13	(1)
2013	América-RN	2	(0)
2014–2015	Chiangrai United	67	(27)
2016	Sukhothai	25	(15)
2017	Chonburi	33	(27)
2018	Air Force Central	12	(3)
2018	Khon Kaen	15	(6)
2018	Ho Chi Minh City	10	(3)
Total		224	(95)
- * Club domestic league appearances and goals

Renan Augustinho Marques (born 8 March 1983) is a Brazilian retired football player.
