= Phontakorn Thosanthiah =

Thai footballer (born 1991)

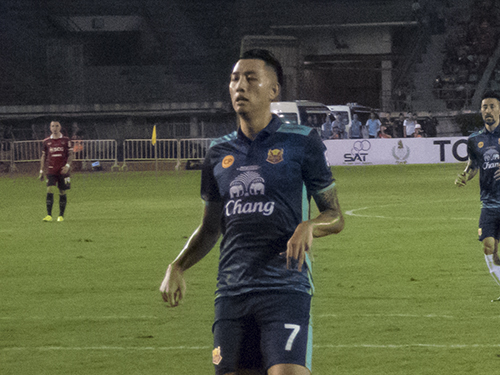

Personal information
- Full name: Phontakorn Thosanthiah
- Date of birth: 4 March 1991 (age 35)
- Place of birth: Bangkok, Thailand
- Height: 1.86 m (6 ft 1 in)
- Position: Defender

Team information
- Current team: Chiangrai TSC
- Number: 88

Youth career
- 2009: Bangkok Glass

Senior career*
Years	Team	Apps	(Gls)
2010–2013	Bangkok Glass	10	(0)
2014	Chainat Hornbill	1	(0)
2014	Sisaket	21	(0)
2015	BEC Tero Sasana	17	(0)
2016	Ratchaburi Mitr Phol	0	(0)
2016–2017	Sukhothai	20	(0)
2025–	Chiangrai TSC	13	(3)
- * Club domestic league appearances and goals as of 22 March 2026 (UTC)

Phontakorn Thosanthiah (Thai: พนธกร โทสันเทียะ, born March 4, 1991) or formerly named Watsaphon Thosanthiah (Thai: วัสพล โทสันเทียะ, simply known as Golf (Thai: กอล์ฟ), is a Thai professional footballer who last played as a defender for Thai League 3 club Chiangrai TSC.
