= Anucha Suksai =

Thai footballer (born 1992)

Personal information
- Full name: Anucha Suksai
- Date of birth: 10 April 1992 (age 34)
- Place of birth: Thailand
- Position: Midfielder

Team information
- Current team: Rayong
- Number: 33

Youth career
- 2007–2010: Assumption College Sriracha

Senior career*
Years	Team	Apps	(Gls)
2011	TTM Phichit	7	(0)
2011–2012	Phetchaburi	19	(1)
2013–2014	Angthong	31	(3)
2015–2016	Sisaket	26	(0)
2016	Sukhothai	6	(1)
2017	Rayong	10	(0)
2018–2019	Nongbua Pitchaya	32	(2)
2020	Trat	0	(0)
2021–	Rayong	5	(0)
- * Club domestic league appearances and goals

Anucha Suksai (Thai: อนุชา สุกใส, born April 10, 1992), is a Thai professional footballer who plays as a midfielder for Thai League 2 club Rayong.
