= Pairot Eiammak =

Thai footballer

Personal information
- Full name: Pairot Eiammak
- Date of birth: 25 February 1992 (age 34)
- Place of birth: Suphan Buri, Thailand
- Height: 1.85 m (6 ft 1 in)
- Position: Goalkeeper

Team information
- Current team: Chiangmai United
- Number: 35

Youth career
- 2007–2008: Bangkok Christian College
- 2009: Thai Honda
- 2010–2011: Muangthong United

Senior career*
Years	Team	Apps	(Gls)
2012	Muangthong United	0	(0)
2013	PTT Rayong	7	(0)
2014	TTM Lopburi	19	(0)
2014	Nakhon Ratchasima	0	(0)
2015	Army United	0	(0)
2015–2018	Sukhothai	68	(0)
2019	Ratchaburi Mitr Phol	5	(0)
2019	→ Chiangmai (loan)	6	(0)
2020–	Chiangmai United	50	(0)
- * Club domestic league appearances and goals as of 12 May 2023

Pairot Eiammak (Thai: ไพโรจน์ เอี่ยมมาก, born 25 February 1992), or simply known as Art (Thai: อาร์ต), is a Thai professional footballer who plays as a goalkeeper for Thai League 2 club Chiangmai United.

== Honours ==
=== Club ===
Nakhon Ratchasima

- Thai Division 1 League (1): 2014
