= Pichit Jaibun =

Thai footballer (born 1986)

Pichit Jaiboon
Personal information
- Full name: Pichit Jaiboon
- Date of birth: 11 July 1986 (age 40)
- Place of birth: Prachinburi, Thailand
- Height: 1.75 m (5 ft 9 in)
- Position: Defensive midfielder

Youth career
- 2006: Rajdamnern Commercial College

Senior career*
| Years | Team | Apps | (Gls) |
| 2007–2012 | BEC Tero Sasana | 57 | (5) |
| 2012 | Esan United | 12 | (1) |
| 2013–2014 | Suphanburi | 27 | (1) |
| 2014 | → Chainat Hornbill (loan) | 14 | (0) |
| 2015–2016 | Chainat Hornbill | 28 | (0) |
| 2017 | Sukhothai | 23 | (0) |
| 2018 | Air Force Central | 24 | (0) |
| 2019–2021 | Trat | 24 | (0) |
| 2021–2023 | Saimit Kabin United | 40 | (0) |
| 2023 | Prachinburi City | 6 | (0) |
| 2024 | Saimit Kabin United | 6 | (0) |
| Total | | 261 | (7) |

International career
| 2013 | Thailand | 4 | (0) |
- * Club domestic league appearances and goals as of 26 February 2024

Pichit Jaibun (Thai: พิชิต ใจบุญ; born November 7, 1986), simply known as Golf (Thai: กอล์ฟ), is a Thai retired professional footballer who plays as a defensive midfielder.

== International career ==
In 2013, he was called up to the national team by Surachai Jaturapattarapong to the 2015 AFC Asian Cup qualification. In October, 2013 he debut for Thailand in a friendly match against Bahrain. In October 15, 2013 he played against Iran in the 2015 AFC Asian Cup qualification.

=== International ===
As of 12 November 2015

| National team | Year | Apps | Goals |
|---|---|---|---|
| Thailand | 2013 | 4 | 0 |
| Thailand | Total | 4 | 0 |
