= Kritsana Kasemkulvilai =

Thai footballer (born 1990)

Personal information
- Full name: Kritsana Kasemkulvilai
- Date of birth: 15 September 1990 (age 36)
- Place of birth: Kanchanaburi, Thailand
- Height: 1.84 m (6 ft 1/2 in)
- Position: Winger

Team information
- Current team: Ayutthaya United
- Number: 11

Youth career
- 2008: Nakhon Pathom Sport School

Senior career*
Years	Team	Apps	(Gls)
2009–2012	Muangkan United		
2013–2014	Hua Hin City		
2014	→ Customs United (loan)		
2015–2017	Sukhothai	34	(2)
2018	Samut Sakhon	19	(6)
2019	Chiangrai United	10	(1)
2020–2021	Nongbua Pitchaya	28	(4)
2021–2023	Lampang	43	(6)
2023–2024	Sukhothai	29	(5)
2024–2025	Kanchanaburi Power	38	(9)
2025–	Ayutthaya United	0	(0)
- * Club domestic league appearances and goals

Kritsana Kasemkulvilai (Thai: กฤษณ เกษมกุลวิไล; born September 15, 1990) is a Thai professional footballer who plays as a midfielder for Thai League 1 club Ayutthaya United.

== Honours ==
=== Club ===
Chiangrai United

- Thai League 1: 2019

Nongbua Pitchaya

- Thai League 2: 2020–21
