= Hiromichi Katano =

Japanese footballer (born 1982)

Personal information
- Full name: Hiromichi Katano
- Date of birth: April 6, 1982 (age 44)
- Place of birth: Funabashi, Chiba, Japan
- Height: 1.79 m (5 ft 10 1/2 in)
- Position: Defender

Team information
- Current team: Rayong
- Number: 4

Youth career
- 2001–2004: Juntendo University

Senior career*
Years	Team	Apps	(Gls)
2005–2007	Tochigi SC	34	(4)
2008	Sagawa Printing	11	(0)
2009–2010	Giravanz Kitakyushu	27	(0)
2011–2014	Osotspa Saraburi	110	(7)
2015–2016	Hong Kong Rangers	8	(0)
2016–2017	Sukhothai	58	(10)
2018	Trat	24	(2)
2019–2021	Sisaket	58	(4)
2021–2023	Trat	57	(2)
2023–	Rayong	51	(3)

Managerial career
- 2022–2023: Trat (assistant)
- * Club domestic league appearances and goals as of 25 January 2025

Hiromichi Katano (片野 寛理, Katano Hiromichi; born April 6, 1982) is a Japanese footballer and coach who is an assistant player-coach for Thai League 1 club Rayong.
