= Baggio Rakotonomenjanahary =

Malagasy footballer (born 1991)

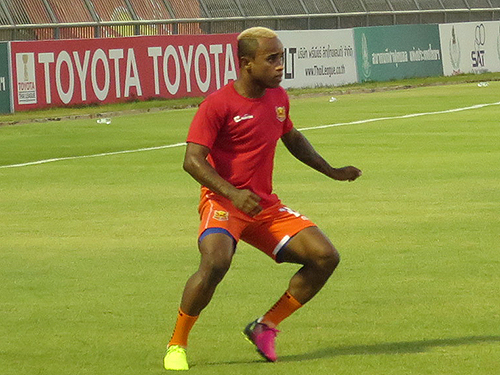
- Rakotonomenjanahary with Sukhothai in 2016

Personal information
- Full name: John Baggio Martial Rakotonomenjanahary
- Date of birth: 19 December 1991 (age 34)
- Place of birth: Madagascar
- Height: 1.58 m (5 ft 2 in)
- Position: Winger

Team information
- Current team: Kanchanaburi Power
- Number: 10

Senior career*
Years	Team	Apps	(Gls)
2008–2010	Academie Ny Antsika		
2011–2013	Stade Tamponnaise		
2013–2014	Concordia Basel	8	(3)
2014	Old Boys	10	(6)
2015–2020	Sukhothai	151	(48)
2021–2022	Port	0	(0)
2022	JS Saint-Pierroise	20	(1)
2023–2026	Sukhothai	102	(32)
2026–	Kanchanaburi Power	7	(3)

International career^{‡}
2011–	Madagascar	12	(1)
- * Club domestic league appearances and goals as of 17 October 2026 ‡ National team caps and goals as of 07:03, 18 June 2026 (UTC)

John Baggio Martial Rakotonomenjanahary (born 19 December 1991), sometimes known as John Baggio, is a Malagasy professional footballer who plays as a winger for Thai League 2 club Kanchanaburi Power. He made eight appearances scoring one goal for the Madagascar national team between 2011 and 2015.

== Career ==
Rakotonomenjanahary has played for Academie Ny Antsika, Stade Tamponnaise, Concordia Basel, Old Boys and Sukhothai. In 2021 he signed for Port. After playing for JS Saint-Pierroise, he returned to Sukhothai.

He made his international debut for Madagascar national team in 2011.

== Career statistics ==
Scores and results list Madagascar's goal tally first.

No	Date	Venue	Opponent	Score	Result	Competition
1.	8 October 2011	Addis Ababa Stadium, Addis Ababa, Ethiopia	Ethiopia	2–2	2–4	2012 Africa Cup of Nations qualification
