= Bireme Diouf =

Ivorian footballer

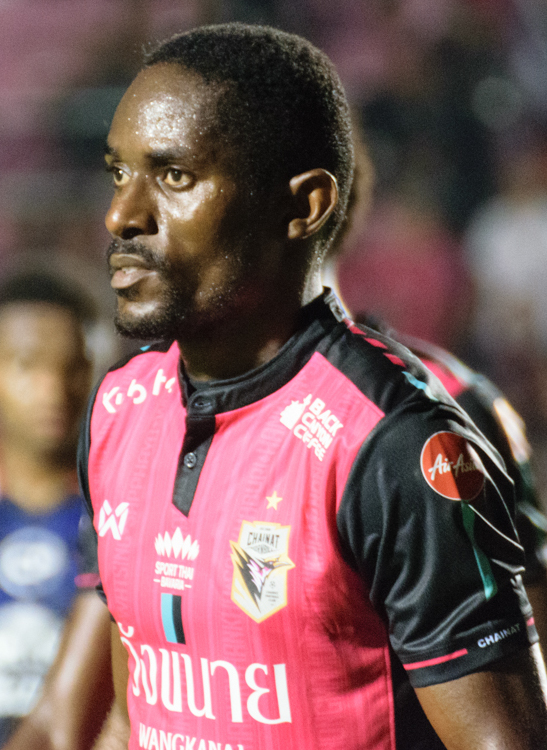
- Diouf in 2018

Personal information
- Full name: Bireme Diouf
- Date of birth: July 2, 1984 (age 42)
- Place of birth: Tiébissou, Ivory Coast
- Height: 1.75 m (5 ft 9 in)
- Position: Forward

Youth career
- 2001–2002: Sabé Sports de Bouna
- 2003: CO de Bamako

Senior career*
Years	Team	Apps	(Gls)
2004–2005	Sabé Sports de Bouna	47	(22)
2006	Muangthong United	0	(0)
2007–2008	→ Samut Songkhram (loan)	16	(5)
2009	→ Yadanarbon (loan)	11	(9)
2010–2012	Samut Songkhram	32	(11)
2012	Chonburi	16	(3)
2012	→ Samut Songkhram (loan)	16	(11)
2013–2014	Suphanburi	51	(11)
2015–2016	Saraburi	28	(6)
2016–2017	Sukhothai	49	(19)
2018	Chainat Hornbill	31	(12)
2019	Trat	25	(7)
2020	Rayong	4	(0)
2020–2021	Muangkan United	23	(17)
2022–2023	Samut Sakhon City	25	(19)
- * Club domestic league appearances and goals as of 19 March 2023

Birame Diouf (born 2 July 1984 in Tiébissou) is an Ivorian former footballer who plays as a forward.
