= Sakdarin Mingsamorn =

Thai footballer (born 1988)

Personal information
- Date of birth: 10 February 1988 (age 38)
- Place of birth: Thailand
- Height: 1.70 m (5 ft 7 in)
- Position: Right-back

Senior career*
Years	Team	Apps	(Gls)
2013–2014	Samutsongkhram	42	(2)
2015	Port	5	(0)
2016–2019	Sukhothai	72	(2)
2020–2021	Nongbua Pitchaya	6	(0)
2021–2022	Trat	7	(0)
2022	Kasem Bundit University	10	(0)
- * Club domestic league appearances and goals as of 20 November 2022

Sakdarin Mingsamorn (Thai: ศักดรินทร์ มิ่งสมร; born February 10, 1988) is a Thai professional footballer who plays as a right-back.

== Honour ==
Nongbua Pitchaya

- Thai League 2: 2020–21
