= Lursan Thiamrat =

Thai footballer (born 1991)

Personal information
- Date of birth: 18 September 1991 (age 35)
- Place of birth: Sakon Nakhon, Thailand
- Height: 1.73 m (5 ft 8 in)
- Position: Attacking midfielder

Senior career*
Years	Team	Apps	(Gls)
2012	Nakhon Nayok	14	(1)
2013–2014	Cha Choeng Sao	44	(19)
2015–2018	Sukhothai	50	(2)
2019	Sisaket	33	(2)
2020–2022	Nongbua Pitchaya	44	(5)
2023–2026	Sukhothai	79	(4)

International career^{‡}
2022	Thailand	1	(0)
- * Club domestic league appearances and goals as of 12 June 2026 ‡ National team caps and goals as of 27 March 2022

Lursan Thiamrat (Thai: เลอสันต์ เทียมราช; born August 18, 1991) is a Thai professional footballer who plays as an attacking midfielder for Thai League 1 club Sukhothai and the Thailand national team.

== International career ==
In 2022, he was called up by Thailand national team for friendly match against Nepal and Suriname. He made his sole appearance for the national team on 27 March 2022 as a substitute in a 1-0 win against Suriname.

== Honour ==
Nongbua Pitchaya

- Thai League 2 Champions : 2020–21
