= Yuttapong Srilakorn =

Thai footballer (born 1985)

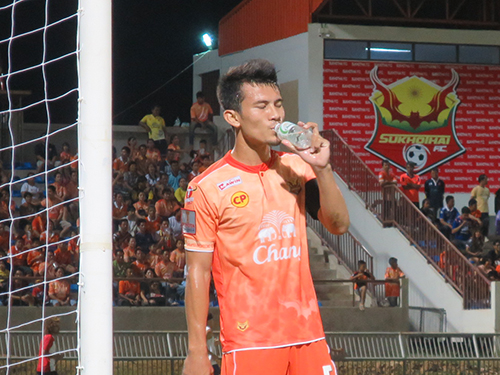

Personal information
- Full name: Yuttapong Srilakorn
- Date of birth: July 12, 1985 (age 41)
- Place of birth: Khon Kaen, Thailand
- Height: 1.72 m (5 ft 7 1/2 in)
- Position: Defender

Team information
- Current team: Muang Trang United
- Number: 4

Youth career
- 2001–2003: Khonkaen Sports School
- 2004–2008: Rajamangala Suvarnabhumi College

Senior career*
Years	Team	Apps	(Gls)
2009	Ayutthaya	21	(0)
2010–2015	Saraburi	104	(0)
2016–2018	Sukhothai	84	(0)
2019	Sisaket	34	(0)
2020–2022	Nongbua Pitchaya	57	(0)
2022–2023	Songkhla	23	(2)
2023–2024	Ayutthaya United	29	(0)
2024–	Muang Trang United	0	(0)
- * Club domestic league appearances and goals as of 1 Oct 2023 (UTC)

Yuttapong Srilakorn (Thai: ยุทธพงษ์ ศรีละคร; born July 12, 1985), is a Thai professional footballer who plays as a defender for Thai League 3 club Muang Trang United.

== Honours ==
=== Club ===
Saraburi

- Regional League Central-East Division: 2010

Nongbua Pitchaya

- Thai League 2: 2020-21

Songkhla

- Thai League 3 Southern Region: 2022–23
