= 2017 Ratchaburi Mitr Phol F.C. season =

Ratchaburi Mitr Phol
2017 season
- Chairman: Tanawat Nitikarnchana
- Manager: Pacheta
- Stadium: Mitr Phol Stadium, Mueang Ratchaburi, Ratchaburi, Thailand
- Thai League T1: 6th
- Thai FA Cup: Round of 64
- Thai League Cup: Semi-finals
- Top goalscorer: League: Marcel Essombé (20); All: Marcel Essombé (21)

The 2017 season is Ratchaburi Mitr Phol's 5th season in the Thai League T1 since 2013.

== Thai League ==
Date	Opponents	H / A	Result F–A	Scorers	League position
11 February 2017	Port	A	1–1	Carlos 77'	11th
19 February 2017	Ubon UMT United	A	1–4	Essombé 60'	13th
26 February 2017	Chiangrai United	H	1–1	Essombé 79'	16th
5 March 2017	Bangkok Glass	A	2–3	Nattawut 9', Akahoshi 55'	16th
8 March 2017	Sukhothai	A	3–0	Akahoshi 24', Sompong 29', Alharbi 57'	12th
12 March 2017	BEC Tero Sasana	H	1–0	Noppol 18'	7th
3 April 2017	Chonburi	A	0–2		13th
8 April 2017	Pattaya United	H	1–0	Sompong 74'	9th
19 April 2017	Nakhon Ratchasima Mazda	A	1–1	Alharbi 24'	10th
22 April 2017	SCG Muangthong United	H	1–1	Essombé 90+1'	11th
30 April 2017	Super Power Samut Prakan	A	5–1	Essombé (3) 48', 54', 72', Chutipol 57', Montree 79'	10th
3 May 2017	Sisaket	H	5–2	Pathomchai 1', Alharbi (2) 17', 61', Essombé (2) 43', 57'	8th
7 May 2017	Buriram United	A	4–3	Sompong 11', Akahoshi 17', Essombé (2) 19', 90+4'	5th
13 May 2017	Suphanburi	A	1–1	Essombé 15'	7th
17 May 2017	Bangkok United	H	1–2	Essombé 90+4' (pen.)	8th
20 May 2017	Navy	A	0–1		9th
27 May 2017	Thai Honda Ladkrabang	H	3–2	Alharbi 13', Essombé 18', Nattawut 27'	9th
17 June 2017	Ubon UMT United	H	1–0	Essombé 77'	7th
24 June 2017	Chiangrai United	A	0–4		7th
28 June 2017	Bangkok Glass	H	1–0	Essombé 39'	7th
1 July 2017	Sukhothai	H	1–1	Chutipol 26'	7th
5 July 2017	BEC Tero Sasana	A	0–0		7th
8 July 2017	Chonburi	H	5–1	Essombé (3) 3', 35' (pen.), 85', Montree 37', Chonlatit 56' (o.g.)	7th
29 July 2017	Pattaya United	A	0–3		7th
5 August 2017	Nakhon Ratchasima Mazda	H	4–0	Essombé 16', Montree (2) 57', 66', Chutipol 86'	7th
10 September 2017	SCG Muangthong United	A	0–3		7th
17 September 2017	Super Power Samut Prakan	H	6–2	Acuña (2) 5', 20', Kevin 17', Rungrath (2) 34', 41', Chutipol 80' (pen.)	7th
20 September 2017	Sisaket	A	3–0	Sompong (2) 34', 47', Acuña 90'	7th
24 September 2017	Buriram United	H	0–2		7th
14 October 2017	Suphanburi	H	4–1	Chutipol 7', Essombé 27', Acuña (2) 33', 83'	6th
22 October 2017	Bangkok United	A	1–2	Nattawut 90+3'	7th
8 November 2017	Navy	H	2–1	Sompong 48', Acuña 61'	6th
11 November 2017	Thai Honda Ladkrabang	A	2–1	Apiwat 63', Nattawut 70'	6th
18 November 2017	Port	H	2–3	Sami 45+1', Nattawut 90+1'	6th

Pos	Team	Pld	W	D	L	GF	GA	GD	Pts	Qualification or relegation
4	Chiangrai United (Q)	34	18	6	10	67	42	+25	60	Qualification to 2018 AFC Champions League Preliminary round 2 (Note: Chiangrai United qualified for the 2018 AFC Champions League Preliminary round 2 as winners of the 2017 Thai FA Cup.)
5	Bangkok Glass	34	16	8	10	63	44	+19	56	
6	Ratchaburi Mitr Phol	34	16	7	11	63	49	+14	55	
7	Chonburi	34	15	8	11	59	59	0	53	
8	Pattaya United	34	15	6	13	60	53	+7	51	

Updated to match(es) played on 18 November 2017. Source: Thai League
Rules for classification: 1) Points; 2) Head-to-head points; 3) Head-to-head goals difference; 4) Head-to-head goals scored; 5) Overall goals difference; 6) Overall goals scored; 7) Fair play points; 8) Play-off without extra time;).
(Q) Qualified for the phase indicated

== Thai FA Cup ==
Date	Opponents	H / A	Result F–A	Scorers	Round
21 June 2017	Buriram United	H	0–1		Round of 64

== Thai League Cup ==
Date	Opponents	H / A	Result F–A	Scorers	Round
26 July 2017	Lamphun Warrior	A	4–0	Montree (3) 28', 56', 90+2' (pen.), Apiwat 60'	Round of 32
1 October 2017	PTT Rayong	A	2–1	Sami 27', Essombé 90+3'	Round of 16
11 October 2017	Sukhothai	H	1–0	Alharbi 33'	Quarter-finals
4 November 2017	Chiangrai United	N	0–1		Semi-finals

== Reserve team in Thai League 4 ==
Ratchaburi Mitr Phol send the reserve team to compete in T4 Western Region as Ratchaburi Mitr Phol B.

Date	Opponents	H / A	Result F–A	Scorers	League position
12 February 2017	BTU United	H	0–0		7th
19 February 2017	Assumption United	H	0–3		9th
27 February 2017	Suphanburi B	H	3–3	Nopphakhun 18', Sompong (2) 45+2', 72' (pen.)	8th
5 March 2017	Look E-San	H	5–2	Nopphakhun 24', Theerathat 48', Narakorn 75', Pornchai 84', Somprat 90+4'	6th
11 March 2017	Huahin City	A	1–0	Attapon 58'	5th
18 March 2017	Pathum Thani United	H	2–1	Attapon 33', Narakorn 79'	4th
25 March 2017	Muangkan United	A	0–2		5th
1 April 2017	Nonthaburi	A	1–4	Thanakorn 65'	6th
9 April 2017	IPE Samut Sakhon United	H	3–2	Chutipol (2) 32', 85', Nattawut 87'	4th
30 April 2017	BTU United	A	1–2	Somprat 37'	5th
7 May 2017	Assumption United	A	0–0		5th
14 May 2017	Suphanburi B	A	2–5	Montree 23', Kanarin 67'	6th
21 May 2017	Look E-San	A	1–1	Satsanapong 17'	6th
28 May 2017	Huahin City	H	1–2	Yai 18'	6th
18 June 2017	Pathum Thani United	A	3–2	Yai 36', Phuritad 43', Narakorn 70'	6th
25 June 2017	Muangkan United	H	0–2		7th
2 July 2017	Nonthaburi	H	4–3	Somsak 34', Montree 48', Narakorn 53', Waris 78'	6th
9 July 2017	IPE Samut Sakhon United	A	1–1	Chadchaphon 63' (o.g.)	5th
16 July 2017	BTU United	A	2–2	Somsak 64', Acuña 65'	5th
22 July 2017	Assumption United	A	1–0	Acuña 40'	5th
30 July 2017	Suphanburi B	A	0–1		6th
6 August 2017	Look E-San	H	4–0	Pawee 20', Somsak (3) 37', 64', 90+2'	5th
12 August 2017	Huahin City	A	1–2	Anucha 90+1'	5th
19 August 2017	Pathum Thani United	H	4–0	Somsak 70', Worathep 74', Pathomchai 81', Narakorn 90+2'	5th
26 August 2017	Muangkan United	A	1–0	Sompong 11'	5th
2 September 2017	Nonthaburi	A	4–0	Apiwat 16', Akahoshi 19', Montree (2) 75', 89'	5th
9 September 2017	IPE Samut Sakhon United	H	0–2		5th

Pos	Team	Pld	W	D	L	GF	GA	GD	Pts	Qualification or relegation
3	BTU United (Q, P)	27	15	6	6	48	28	+20	51	Qualification to the Thai League 4 Champions League
4	Assumption United	27	14	6	7	46	24	+22	48	
5	Ratchaburi Mitr Phol B	27	11	6	10	45	42	+3	39	
6	IPE Samut Sakhon United	27	11	5	11	39	40	−1	38	
7	Huahin City	27	9	2	16	35	40	−5	29	

Updated to match(es) played on 20 October 2017. Source: Thai League 4
Rules for classification: 1) Points; 2) Head-to-head points; 3) Head-to-head goals difference; 4) Head-to-head goals scored; 5) Overall goals difference; 6) Overall goals scored; 7) Fair play points; 8) Play-off without extra time;).
(P) Promoted; (Q) Qualified for the phase indicated

== Squad goals statistics ==
No.	Pos.	Name	League	FA Cup	League Cup	Total
2	DF	(Thailand) Sila Srikampang	0	0	0	0
3	DF	(Brazil) Carlos Santos	1	0	0	1
5	MF	(Thailand) Noppol Pol-udom	0	0	0	0
6	DF	(Thailand) Chompon Buangam	0	0	0	0
7	MF	(Thailand) Chutipol Thongthae	0	0	0	0
8	MF	(Thailand) Kanarin Thawornsak	0	0	0	0
9	FW	(Thailand) Nattawut Sombatyotha	1	0	0	1
10	MF	(Morocco) Alharbi El Jadeyaoui	0	0	0	0
11	MF	(Thailand) Rungrath Poomchantuek	0	0	0	0
13	MF	(Thailand) Yai Nilwong	0	0	0	0
15	MF	(Thailand) Phuritad Jarikanon	0	0	0	0
17	DF	(Thailand) Ekkaluck Thonghkit	0	0	0	0
18	FW	(Cameroon) Marcel Essombé	2	0	0	2
19	DF	(Thailand) Apiwat Ngaolamhin	0	0	0	0
24	FW	(Thailand) Sompong Soleb	0	0	0	0
27	GK	(Thailand) Ukrit Wongmeema	0	0	0	0
30	GK	(Thailand) Farut Patee	0	0	0	0
31	MF	(Thailand) Pathomchai Sueasakul	0	0	0	0
32	GK	(Thailand) Chayoot Nakchamnarn	0	0	0	0
34	MF	(Thailand) Adisak Klinkosoom	0	0	0	0
35	DF	(Thailand) Satsanapong Wattayuchutikul	0	0	0	0
37	MF	(Japan) Takafumi Akahoshi	1	0	0	1
39	DF	(Thailand) Prawee Tantatemee	0	0	0	0
40	FW	(Thailand) Siwarut Pholhirun	0	0	0	0
–	DF	(Thailand) Kornkawee Chaweeborisut	0	0	0	0
–	DF	(Thailand) Kosawat Wongwailikit	0	0	0	0

== Transfers ==
First Thai footballer's market is opening on 14 December 2016 to 28 January 2017
Second Thai footballer's market is opening on 3 June 2017 to 30 June 2017

=== In ===
Date	Pos.	Name	From
14 November 2016	MF	(Morocco) Alharbi El Jadeyaoui	(Azerbaijan) Qarabağ
14 November 2016	MF	(Thailand) Montree Promsawat	(Thailand) Bangkok
14 November 2016	MF	(Thailand) Kritsananon Srisuwan	(Thailand) Bangkok
16 November 2016	MF	(Thailand) Phuritad Jarikanon	(Thailand) PTT Rayong
16 November 2016	FW	(Cameroon) Marcel Essombé	(Romania) FC Dinamo București
27 November 2016	DF	(Thailand) Muhammad Saiful Smahae	(Thailand) Nara United
27 November 2016	GK	(Thailand) Farut Patee	(Thailand) Nara United
31 December 2016	DF	(Thailand) Satsanapong Wattayuchutikul	(Thailand) Pattaya United
31 December 2016	DF	(Thailand) Kornkawee Chaweeborisut	(Thailand) Ratchaburi Mitr Phol RBAC
31 December 2016	FW	(Thailand) Siwarut Pholhirun	(Thailand) Ratchaburi Mitr Phol RBAC
7 January 2017	MF	(Japan) Takafumi Akahoshi	(Poland) Pogoń Szczecin
10 January 2017	DF	(Thailand) Kevin Deeromram	(Sweden) Djurgårdens IF
30 January 2017	MF	(Thailand) Adisak Klinkosoom	(Thailand) Chainat Hornbill
14 February 2017	FW	(Paraguay) Javier Acuña	(Spain) Numancia
6 June 2017	DF	(Democratic Republic of the Congo) Joël Sami	(France) US Orléans
12 June 2017	GK	(Thailand) Chinnapong Raksri	(Thailand) Buriram United
12 June 2017	MF	(Thailand) Philip Roller	Austria Lustenau

=== Out ===
Date	Pos.	Name	To
4 October 2016	MF	(Thailand) Atthawit Sukchuai	(Thailand) Bangkok Glass
23 October 2016	FW	(Argentina) Germán Pacheco	(Peru) Alianza Lima
30 November 2016	MF	(Thailand) Attapong Nooprom	(Thailand) Army United
31 December 2016	MF	(Japan) Takuya Murayama	Released
31 December 2016	FW	(Portugal) Yannick Djaló	Released
31 December 2016	MF	(Thailand) Todsawee Deeprasert	(Thailand) Chainat Hornbill
31 December 2016	GK	(Thailand) Prin Goonchorn	(Thailand) Phayao
31 December 2016	FW	(Poland) Łukasz Gikiewicz	(Jordan) Al-Faisaly
19 January 2017	MF	(Thailand) Singkorn Mungkud	(Thailand) Ayutthaya United

=== Loan in ===
Date from	Date to	Pos.	Name	From
8 February 2017	31 December 2017	FW	(Thailand) Sompong Soleb	(Thailand) Bangkok United

=== Loan out ===
Date from	Date to	Pos.	Name	To
18 January 2017	31 December 2017	MF	(Thailand) Kritsananon Srisuwan	(Thailand) Prachuap
