= 2016 Ratchaburi Mitr Phol F.C. season =

Ratchaburi Mitr Phol
2016 season
- Chairman: Boonying Nitikarnchana
- Manager: Pacheta
- Stadium: Mitr Phol Stadium, Mueang Ratchaburi, Ratchaburi, Thailand
- Thai League: 6th
- Thai FA Cup: Champions Shared with Sukhothai, Chonburi, and Chainat Hornbill
- Thai League Cup: Round of 64
- Top goalscorer: League: Heberty Fernandes (20); All: Heberty Fernandes (20)

The 2016 season is Ratchaburi Mitr Phol's 4th season in the Thai Premier League of Ratchaburi Mitr Phol Football Club. Since 2013 to present.

== Foreign players ==
Note: Flags indicate national team as defined under FIFA eligibility rules; some limited exceptions apply. Players may hold more than one non-FIFA nationality.

| No. | Pos. | Nation | Player |
|---|---|---|---|
| 3 | DF | BRA | Carlos Santos |
| 14 | MF | JPN | Takuya Murayama |
| 23 | MF | POR | Yannick Djaló |
| 33 | FW | POL | Łukasz Gikiewicz |
| 37 | FW | TLS | Heberty Fernandes |

== Thai League ==
| Pos | Team | Pld | W | D | L | GF | GA | GD | Pts | Qualification or relegation |
|---|---|---|---|---|---|---|---|---|---|---|
| 4 | Buriram United | 30 | 15 | 10 | 5 | 55 | 38 | +17 | 55 | |
| 5 | Chonburi | 31 | 14 | 9 | 8 | 52 | 33 | +19 | 51 | |
| 6 | Ratchaburi Mitr Phol | 30 | 14 | 7 | 9 | 52 | 35 | +17 | 49 | |
| 7 | Sukhothai (Q) | 31 | 13 | 6 | 12 | 50 | 44 | +6 | 45 | 2017 AFC Champions League preliminary round 2 (Note: Qualified as drawn winners of the 2016 Thai FA Cup.) |
| 8 | Chiangrai United | 31 | 13 | 6 | 12 | 42 | 43 | −1 | 45 | |

Updated to match(es) played on 25 September 2016. Source: Thai League
Rules for classification: 1) points; 2) goal difference; 3) number of goals scored.
(Q) Qualified for the phase indicated
Notes:

| Date | Opponents | H / A | Result F–A | Scorers | League position |
|---|---|---|---|---|---|
| 6 March 2016 | BBCU | H | 2–0 | Heberty 11', Yannick 83' | 3rd |
| 9 March 2016 | Army United | A | 3–1 | Heberty 10' (pen.), Yannick (2) 40', 56' | 1st |
| 12 March 2016 | SCG Muangthong United | A | 0–3 | | 4th |
| 16 March 2016 | Sukhothai | A | 0–2 | | 11th |
| 30 March 2016 | BEC Tero Sasana | A | 4–0 | Heberty 3', Sreten 15' (o.g.), Łukasz 34', Adisak 55' | 6th |
| 2 April 2016 | Nakhon Ratchasima Mazda | H | 2–0 | Heberty 42', Murayama 61' | 5th |
| 23 April 2016 | Bangkok Glass | H | 4–3 | Murayama 15', Heberty (3) 45+1', 53', 58' | 5th |
| 27 April 2016 | Navy | A | 0–0 | | 5th |
| 30 April 2016 | Bangkok United | H | 0–1 | | 6th |
| 7 May 2016 | Sisaket | A | 1–1 | Heberty 45+2' (pen.) | 7th |
| 11 May 2016 | Chonburi | H | 0–0 | | 6th |
| 15 May 2016 | Chiangrai United | A | 0–1 | | 9th |
| 22 May 2016 | Pattaya United | H | 6–0 | Heberty (3) 26' (pen.), 45+2', 85', Yannick (2) 42', 90+1', Satsanapong 49' (o.g.) | 7th |
| 28 May 2016 | Osotspa M-150 Samut Prakan | A | 4–4 | Yannick 10', Heberty (3) 27' (pen.), 68', 73' | 7th |
| 12 June 2016 | Buriram United | A | 1–0 | Yannick 45' | 6th |
| 19 June 2016 | Chainat Hornbill | A | 2–2 | Yannick 27', Adisak 40' | 6th |
| 22 June 2016 | Suphanburi | H | 2–1 | Heberty (2) 73', 76' | 6th |
| 25 June 2016 | BBCU | A | 1–3 | Heberty 37' | 6th |
| 29 June 2016 | Army United | H | 3–1 | Rungrath 17', Heberty (2) 49', 81' | 5th |
| 2 July 2016 | SCG Muangthong United | H | 3–1 | Heberty 6', Yannick 57', Pathomchai 70' | 4th |
| 10 July 2016 | BEC Tero Sasana | H | 2–0 | Nattawut 20', Yannick 76' | 4th |
| 16 July 2016 | Nakhon Ratchasima Mazda | A | 0–1 | | 5th |
| 20 July 2016 | Bangkok Glass | A | 0–3 | | 5th |
| 23 July 2016 | Navy | H | 2–1 | Yannick (2) 42', 90+2' | 5th |
| 31 July 2016 | Bangkok United | A | 1–2 | Ogunjimi 58' | 5th |
| 7 August 2016 | Sisaket | H | 4–0 | Nattawut 39', Noppol 54', Yannick 65' (pen.), Kanarin 90+1' | 5th |
| 13 August 2016 | Chonburi | A | 0–2 | | 6th |
| 20 August 2016 | Chiangrai United | H | 1–1 | Yai 46' | 5th |
| 10 September 2016 | Pattaya NNK United (Note: In mid-2016, Pattaya United change the name to Pattaya NNK United due to their take sponsor.) | A | 1–1 | Rungrath 36' | 6th |
| 18 September 2016 | Super Power Samut Prakan (Note: In mid-2016, Osotspa M-150 Samut Prakan change the name to Super Power Samut Prakan due to their take over.) | H | 3–0 | Yai 5', Yannick (2) 71', 90+1' | 6th |

== Thai FA Cup ==
Chang FA Cup

| Date | Opponents | H / A | Result F–A | Scorers | Round |
|---|---|---|---|---|---|
| 15 June 2016 | Kasetsart | H | 1–0 | Sila 74' | Round of 64 |
| 13 July 2016 | Ubon UMT United | A | 2–0 | Pacheco 23', Carlos 57' | Round of 32 |
| 3 August 2016 | Nakhon Ratchasima Mazda | H | 2–1 (a.e.t.) | Yannick (2) 77', 94' (pen.) | Round of 16 |
| 21 September 2016 | Khon Kaen United | H | Auto win (Note: Khon Kaen United had deprived during season.) | | Quarter-finals |
| 2 November 2016 | Sukhothai | N | Shared | | Semi-finals |

== Thai League Cup ==
Toyota League Cup

| Date | Opponents | H / A | Result F–A | Scorers | Round |
|---|---|---|---|---|---|
| 9 April 2016 | Chanthaburi | A | 0–2 | | Round of 64 |

== Squad goals statistics ==
| No. | Pos. | Name | League | FA Cup | League Cup | Total |
|---|---|---|---|---|---|---|
| 3 | DF | (Brazil) Carlos Santos | 0 | 1 | 0 | 1 |
| 4 | MF | (Thailand) Attapong Nooprom | 0 | 0 | 0 | 0 |
| 5 | MF | (Thailand) Noppol Pol-udom | 1 | 0 | 0 | 1 |
| 6 | DF | (Thailand) Chompon Buangam | 0 | 0 | 0 | 0 |
| 7 | MF | (Thailand) Chutipol Thongthae | 0 | 0 | 0 | 0 |
| 8 | MF | (Thailand) Kanarin Thawornsak | 1 | 0 | 0 | 1 |
| 9 | FW | (Thailand) Nattawut Sombatyotha | 2 | 0 | 0 | 2 |
| 10 | FW | (Argentina) Germán Pacheco | 0 | 1 | 0 | 1 |
| 11 | MF | (Thailand) Rungrath Poomchantuek | 2 | 0 | 0 | 2 |
| 13 | MF | (Thailand) Yai Nilwong | 2 | 0 | 0 | 2 |
| 14 | MF | (Japan) Takuya Murayama | 2 | 0 | 0 | 2 |
| 17 | DF | (Thailand) Ekkaluck Thonghkit | 0 | 0 | 0 | 0 |
| 18 | DF | (Thailand) Sila Srikampang | 0 | 1 | 0 | 1 |
| 19 | DF | (Thailand) Apiwat Ngaolamhin | 0 | 0 | 0 | 0 |
| 21 | DF | (Thailand) Kritnaphop Mekpatcharakul | 0 | 0 | 0 | 0 |
| 23 | MF | (Portugal) Yannick Djaló | 15 | 2 | 0 | 17 |
| 24 | MF | (Thailand) Singkorn Mungkud | 0 | 0 | 0 | 0 |
| 25 | MF | (Thailand) Todsawee Deeprasert | 0 | 0 | 0 | 0 |
| 27 | GK | (Thailand) Ukrit Wongmeema | 0 | 0 | 0 | 0 |
| 31 | MF | (Thailand) Pathomchai Sueasakul | 1 | 0 | 0 | 1 |
| 32 | GK | (Thailand) Teerath Nakchamnarn | 0 | 0 | 0 | 0 |
| 35 | FW | (Belgium) Marvin Ogunjimi | 1 | 0 | 0 | 1 |
| 38 | GK | (Thailand) Prin Goonchorn | 0 | 0 | 0 | 0 |
| 39 | DF | (Thailand) Pawee Tanthatemee | 0 | 0 | 0 | 0 |
Out on loan
| – | FW | (Poland) Łukasz Gikiewicz | 1 | 0 | 0 | 1 |
Left club during season
| – | DF | (Thailand) Watsaphon Thosanthiah | 0 | 0 | 0 | 0 |
| – | FW | (Timor-Leste) Heberty Fernandes | 20 | 0 | 0 | 20 |
| – | MF | (Thailand) Adisak Srikampang | 2 | 0 | 0 | 2 |

== Transfers ==
First Thai footballer's market is opening on 14 December 2015 to 28 January 2016
Second Thai footballer's market is opening on 3 June 2016 to 30 June 2016

=== In ===
| Date | Pos. | Name | From |
|---|---|---|---|
| 25 December 2015 | FW | (Thailand) Nattawut Sombatyotha | (Thailand) Buriram United |
| 11 January 2016 | DF | (Thailand) Watsaphon Thosanthiah | (Thailand) BEC Tero Sasana |
| 16 January 2016 | GK | (Thailand) Prin Goonchorn | (Thailand) Phayao |
| 18 January 2016 | MF | (Japan) Takuya Murayama | (Poland) Pogoń Szczecin |
| 18 January 2016 | MF | (Thailand) Pathomchai Sueasakul | (Thailand) Saraburi |
| 28 January 2016 | DF | (Brazil) Carlos Santos de Jesus | (Iran) Naft Tehran |
| 2 February 2016 | FW | (Portugal) Yannick Djaló | (Portugal) Benfica |
| 5 February 2016 | FW | (Poland) Łukasz Gikiewicz | (Saudi Arabia) Al-Wehda |
| 28 June 2016 | MF | (Thailand) Rungrath Poomchantuek | (Thailand) Chiangrai United |
| 28 June 2016 | MF | (Thailand) Noppol Pol-udom | (Thailand) Super Power Samut Prakan |
| 28 June 2016 | FW | (Argentina) Germán Pacheco | (Malaysia) Pahang |

=== Out ===
| Date | Pos. | Name | To |
|---|---|---|---|
| 14 December 2015 | DF | (Ivory Coast) Henri Jöel | (Thailand) Chiangmai |
| 14 December 2015 | MF | (Thailand) Rattana Petch-Aporn | (Thailand) Suphanburi |
| 25 December 2015 | FW | (Republic of Ireland) Andy Keogh | (Australia) Perth Glory |
| 7 January 2016 | MF | (Japan) Genki Nagasato | (Thailand) Port |
| 17 January 2016 | DF | (Thailand) Prayad Boonya | (Thailand) Loei City |
| 6 February 2016 | MF | (Brazil) Wander Luiz | (Brazil) Tombense |
| 14 June 2016 | DF | (Thailand) Watsaphon Thosanthiah | (Thailand) Sukhothai |
| 3 July 2016 | FW | (Timor-Leste) Heberty Fernandes | (Saudi Arabia) Al-Shabab |
| 15 July 2016 | MF | (Thailand) Adisak Srikampang | (Thailand) Ubon UMT United |

=== Loan in ===
| Date from | Date to | Pos. | Name | From |
|---|---|---|---|---|
| 31 December 2015 | 31 December 2016 | FW | (Thailand) Kritnaphop Mekpatcharakul | (Thailand) Army United |
| 5 July 2016 | 31 December 2016 | FW | (Belgium) Marvin Ogunjimi | (South Korea) Suwon |

=== Loan out ===
| Date from | Date to | Pos. | Name | To |
|---|---|---|---|---|
| 15 July 2016 | 31 December 2016 | FW | (Poland) Łukasz Gikiewicz | (Thailand) BEC Tero Sasana |
