= 2018 Ratchaburi Mitr Phol F.C. season =

Ratchaburi Mitr Phol
2018 season
- Chairman: Boonying Nitikarnchana
- Head coach: Lassaad Chabbi
- Stadium: Mitr Phol Stadium, Mueang Ratchaburi, Ratchaburi, Thailand
- Thai League: 12th
- Thai FA Cup: Semi-finals
- Thai League Cup: Round of 32
- Top goalscorer: League: Kang Soo-il (13); All: Kang Soo-il (14)
- All statistics correct as of 21 October 2018.

The 2018 season is Ratchaburi Mitr Phol Football Club's 12th existence. It is the 3rd season in the Thai League and the club's 6th consecutive season in the top flight of the Thai football league system since promoted in the 2013 season.

== League by seasons ==
Season	League	Position	Notes
2007	Thai Division 1 League	12th	* Found by competed as Ratchaburi F.C. * Relegated to Thai League Division 2
2008	Thai League Division 2	7th	
2009	Regional League Division 2 Central & Eastern region	9th	
2010	Regional League Division 2 Central & Eastern region	9th	
2011	Regional League Division 2 Central & Eastern region	1st	Promoted to Thai Division 1 League
2012	Thai Division 1 League	1st	Promoted to Thai Premier League
2013	Thai Premier League	15th	Renamed to Ratchaburi Mitr Phol F.C.
2014	Thai Premier League	4th	
2015	Thai Premier League	7th	
2016	Thai League	6th	Thai Premier League renamed to Thai League
2017	Thai League	6th	
2018	Thai League	12th	

== Competitions ==
=== Thai League ===
Date	Opponents	H / A	Result F–A	Scorers	League position	External links
9 February 2018	Buriram United	A	1–2	Menezes 75' (pen.)	14th	Lineups Report
18 February 2018	Air Force Central	H	1–0	Wanchai 71' (o.g.)	9th	Lineups Report
24 February 2018	Port	A	2–3	Pathomchai 44', Soo-il 77'	11th	Lineups Report
4 March 2018	Bangkok United	H	1–2	Pathomchai 1'	15th	Lineups Report
11 March 2018	Chiangrai United	A	0–2		16th	Lineups Report
18 March 2018	Nakhon Ratchasima Mazda	H	3–0	Chutipol 4', Bill (2) 7', 25'	13th	Lineups Report
28 March 2018	Chonburi	A	1–2	Sami 20'	14th	Lineups Report
1 April 2018	Navy	H	4–0	Soo-il (3) 4', 43', 77', Chutipol 20'	12th	Lineups Report
7 April 2018	Ubon UMT United	A	2–1	Bill 59', Soo-il 68'	12th	Lineups Report
11 April 2018	PT Prachuap	H	2–1	Bill 35', Soo-il 87'	9th	Lineups Report
22 April 2018	Suphanburi	A	2–2	Bill (2) 45+2', 86' (pen.)	9th	Lineups Report
25 April 2018	Bangkok Glass	H	2–1	Menezes 15', Soo-il 56'	6th	Lineups Report
29 April 2018	SCG Muangthong United	A	2–2	Chutipol 9', Roller 49'	9th	Lineups Report
6 May 2018	Chainat Hornbill	A	1–2	Soo-il 75'	10th	Lineups Report
12 May 2018	Pattaya United	H	2–1	Soo-il 39', Pratum 90+3'	8th	Lineups Report
19 May 2018	Police Tero	H	3–2	Soo-il 10', Roller 90+1', Nattawut 90+3'	7th	Lineups Report
26 May 2018	Sukhothai	A	2–3	Sompong (2) 13', 69'	7th	Lineups Report
10 June 2018	Air Force Central	A	1–0	Sompong 34'	7th	Lineups Report
16 June 2018	Port	H	1–4	Yannick 89'	7th	Lineups Report
23 June 2018	Bangkok United	A	1–1	Valskis 45'	7th	Lineups Report
1 July 2018	Chiangrai United	H	0–4		7th	Lineups Report
7 July 2018	Nakhon Ratchasima Mazda	A	1–2	Valskis 78'	10th	Lineups Report
14 July 2018	Chonburi	H	1–1	Pravinwat 27'	9th	Lineups Report
22 July 2018	Navy	A	2–2	Hartmann 33', Valskis 56'	10th	Lineups Report
28 July 2018	Ubon UMT United	H	2–0	Montree 16', Valskis 65'	7th	Lineups Report
4 August 2018	PT Prachuap	A	1–2	Valskis 50'	9th	Lineups Report
5 September 2018	Suphanburi	H	1–2	Chutipol 71'	9th	Lineups Report
9 September 2018	Bangkok Glass	A	1–2	Soo-il 67'	11th	Lineups Report
12 September 2018	SCG Muangthong United	H	1–2	Valskis 15'	12th	Lineups Report
16 September 2018	Chainat Hornbill	H	2–1	Valskis (2) 68', 90+3'	11th	Lineups Report
22 September 2018	Pattaya United	A	2–2	Sami 74', Soo-il 89'	12th	Lineups Report
30 September 2018	Police Tero	A	2–1	Soo-il 17' (pen.), Valskis 90+2'	11th	Lineups Report
3 October 2018	Sukhothai	H	0–0		11th	Lineups Report
7 October 2018	Buriram United	H	0–1		12th	Lineups Report

Pos	Team	Pld	W	D	L	GF	GA	GD	Pts	Qualification or relegation
10	Suphanburi	34	11	13	10	43	35	+8	46 (Note: Head-to-head record (Mini league): Pattaya United 10 pts, Chonburi 6 pts, Suphanburi 1 pt.)	
11	Sukhothai	34	12	7	15	53	63	−10	43 (Note: Sukhothai ahead on head-to-head record; Sukhothai 4 pts, Ratchaburi Mitr Phol 1 pt.)	
12	Ratchaburi Mitr Phol	34	12	7	15	50	53	−3	43	
13	Chainat Hornbill	34	11	9	14	46	52	−6	42 (Note: Chainat Hornbill ahead on head-to-head record; Chainat Hornbill 4 pts, Bangkok Glass 1 pt.)	
14	Bangkok Glass (R)	34	11	9	14	55	46	+9	42	Relegation to the 2019 Thai League 2

Source: Thai League
Rules for classification: 1) Points; 2) Head-to-head points; 3) Head-to-head goals difference; 4) Head-to-head goals scored; 5) Overall goals difference; 6) Overall goals scored; 7) Fair play points; 8) Play-off without extra time;).
(R) Relegated

=== Thai FA Cup ===
Date	Opponents	H / A	Result F–A	Scorers	Round
27 June 2018	Suphanburi	A	1–0	Valskis 22'	Round of 64
4 July 2018	Bangkok Glass	A	3–1 (a.e.t.)	Suree 47', Yannick 106', Valskis 109'	Round of 32
25 July 2018	Krabi	H	5–0	Yannick (2) 7', 84', Hartmann 14', Montree 78', Sompong 90'	Round of 16
1 August 2018	Chonburi	H	1–0	Nattawut 90+1'	Quarter-finals
26 September 2018	Chiangrai United	N	1–3 (a.e.t.)	Victor 66' (o.g.)	Semi-finals

=== Thai League Cup ===
Date	Opponents	H / A	Result F–A	Scorers	Round
13 June 2018	Ranong United	A	2–2 (a.e.t.) (4–5p)	Soo-il 5', Montree 55'	Round of 32
