= Tawatchai Kuammungkun =

Thai footballer (born 1997)

Personal information
- Full name: Tawatchai Kuammungkun
- Date of birth: 3 May 1997 (age 29)
- Place of birth: Ubon Ratchathani, Thailand
- Height: 1.73 m (5 ft 8 in)
- Position: Right back

Youth career
- 2012–2014: Pathum Kongka School
- 2015–2017: Leicester City

Senior career*
Years	Team	Apps	(Gls)
2017–2018	Police Tero	11	(0)
2018–2020	Chiangrai United	6	(0)
2021–2022	Customs Ladkrabang United	6	(0)
2022–	Chainat Hornbill	5	(0)

International career
2017–2018	Thailand U21	3	(0)
2017–2018	Thailand U23	1	(0)
- * Club domestic league appearances and goals as of 00:58, 21 September 2017 (UTC)

Tawatchai Kuammungkun (Thai: ธวัชชัย คำมุงคุณ; born 3 May 1997) is a Thai professional footballer who plays as a right back for Thai League 1 club Chiangrai United.

== Club career ==
In his youth career, Kuammungkun was trained for two and a half years at Leicester City in England.

== Honours ==
=== Club ===
Chiangrai United

- Thai League 1 (1) : 2019
- Thai FA Cup (1) : 2018
- Thai League Cup (1) : 2018
