= Chenrop Samphaodi =

Thai footballer (born 1995)

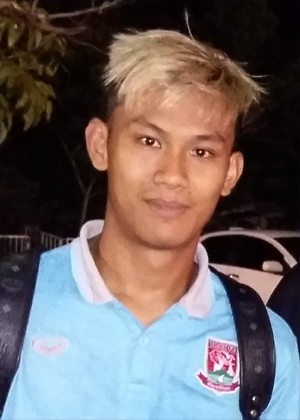

Personal information
- Full name: Chenrop Samphaodi
- Date of birth: 2 June 1995 (age 31)
- Place of birth: Surin, Thailand
- Height: 1.80 m (5 ft 11 in)
- Position: Striker

Team information
- Current team: Kanchanaburi Power
- Number: 10

Youth career
- 2009–2011: Bangkok Christian College

Senior career*
| Years | Team | Apps | (Gls) |
| 2012–2017 | BEC Tero Sasana | 60 | (3) |
| 2012 | → RBAC (loan) | 14 | (5) |
| 2013–2014 | → BCC FC (loan) | 29 | (12) |
| 2018–2019 | Muangthong United | 13 | (4) |
| 2019 | → Trat (loan) | 14 | (3) |
| 2019–2020 | Port | 7 | (0) |
| 2020–2024 | BG Pathum United | 49 | (9) |
| 2022–2023 | → Lamphun Warriors (loan) | 25 | (0) |
| 2024 | PT Prachuap | 9 | (1) |
| 2024–2026 | Kanchanaburi Power | 39 | (7) |

International career
| 2013–2014 | Thailand U19 | 14 | (9) |
| 2016 | Thailand U21 | 4 | (2) |
| 2015–2018 | Thailand U23 | 25 | (9) |
| 2016 | Thailand | 1 | (0) |
Medal record
Thailand under-21
Nations Cup
| Winner | Nations Cup 2016 | Football |
Thailand under-23
Sea Games
| Gold medal – first place | Sea Games 2015 | Football |
| Gold medal – first place | Sea Games 2017 | Football |
- * Club domestic league appearances and goals as of 1 March 2025

Chenrop Samphaodi (Thai: เจนรบ สำเภาดี; born June 2, 1995) is a Thai professional footballer who plays as a striker for Thai League 2 club Kanchanaburi Power (on loan from PT Prachuap) and the Thailand national team.

== Club career ==
Chenrop made his professional debut with BEC Tero Sasana as a substitute in a 3–1 loss to Bangkok United on 4 April 2015.

== International career ==
Chenrop won the 2015 Southeast Asian Games with Thailand U23, and scored two goals in the tournament. In 2016 Chenrop was selected in Thailand U23 squad for 2016 AFC U-23 Championship in Qatar. In March, 2016 Chenrop was called up in a friendly match against South Korea, and was substituted on in the second half of that match. In August 2017, he won the Football at the 2017 Southeast Asian Games with Thailand U23.

== Honours ==
=== Club ===
==== Port ====
- Thai FA Cup (1): 2019

==== BG Pathum United ====
- Thai League 1 (1): 2020–21
- Thailand Champions Cup (1): 2021
- Thai League Cup: 2023–24

=== International ===
==== Thailand U23 ====
- Sea Games Gold Medal (2); 2015, 2017
- Dubai Cup (1) : 2017

==== Thailand U21 ====
- Nations Cup (1): 2016
