= Football at the 2017 SEA Games – Men's tournament =

2017 SEA Games Men's Football Tournament
Tournament details
- Host country: Malaysia
- Dates: 14–29 August
- Teams: 11 (from 11 associations)
- Venue: 4 (in 3 host cities)

Final positions
- Champions: Thailand (16th title)
- Runners-up: Malaysia
- Third place: Indonesia
- Fourth place: Myanmar

Tournament statistics
- Matches played: 29
- Goals scored: 79 (2.72 per match)
- Top scorer(s): (Malaysia) Thanabalan Nadarajah (Myanmar) Aung Thu (Vietnam) Nguyễn Công Phượng (4 goals each)

The men's football tournament at the 2017 SEA Games was held from 14 to 29 August in Malaysia in August 2017. In this tournament, all 11 Southeast Asian teams played in the men's competition. In addition to the host city of Kuala Lumpur, matches were also played in Shah Alam and Selayang. Associations affiliated with FIFA might send teams to participate in the tournament. Men's teams were restricted to under-22 players (born on or after 1 January 1995).

Thailand won the tournament for the third straight time and a record-extending sixteenth time total.

== Competition schedule ==
The following was the competition schedule for the men's football competitions:

| G | Group stage | ½ | Semifinals | B | 3rd place play-off | F | Final |

| Mon 14 | Tue 15 | Wed 16 | Thu 17 | Fri 18 | Sat 19 | Sun 20 | Mon 21 | Tue 22 | Wed 23 | Thu 24 | Fri 25 | Sat 26 | Sun 27 | Mon 28 | Tue 29 | |
|---|---|---|---|---|---|---|---|---|---|---|---|---|---|---|---|---|
| G | G | G | G | G | | G | G | G | G | G | | ½ | | | B | F |

== Participating nations ==
The following eleven teams participated for the competition.

- Brunei (BRU)
- Cambodia (CAM)
- Indonesia (INA)
- Laos (LAO)
- Malaysia (MAS)
- Myanmar (MYA)
- Philippines (PHI)
- Singapore (SGP)
- Thailand (THA)
- Timor-Leste (TLS)
- Vietnam (VIE)

== Venues ==
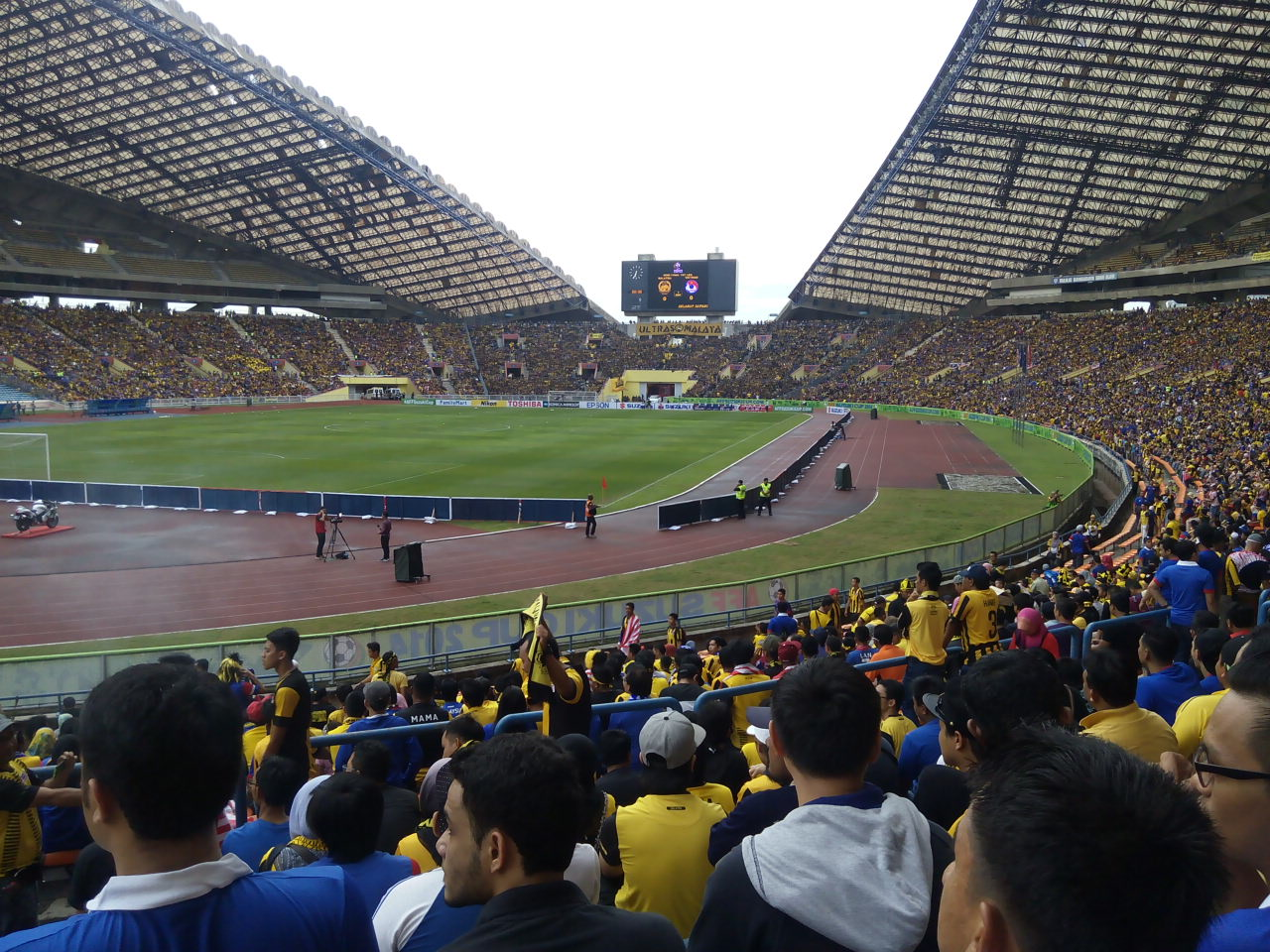
Shah Alam Stadium, Selangor, venue for final matches.

The tournament was held in four venues across three cities:

- Shah Alam Stadium, Shah Alam (Capacity: 80,372)
- UiTM Stadium, Shah Alam (Capacity: 6,000)
- UM Arena Stadium, Kuala Lumpur (Capacity: 1,000)
- Selayang Municipal Council Stadium, Selayang (Capacity: 16,000)

The Kuala Lumpur Football Stadium was one of the original venue for the football tournament, until it was replaced by Selayang Municipal Council Stadium in July 2017 due to unsatisfactory conditions in the stadium renovations. The Bukit Jalil National Stadium were also originally planned for the final matches before it was changed to Shah Alam Stadium due to several factors.

== Squads ==
The men's tournament was an under-22 international tournament (born on or after 1 January 1995), with a maximum of three overage players allowed, while there were no age restrictions on women's teams.

== Draw ==
The draw for the tournament was held on 8 July 2017, 10:00 MST (UTC+8), at the Renaissance Kuala Lumpur Hotel, Kuala Lumpur. The 11 teams in the men's tournament were drawn into two groups of five and six teams. The teams were seeded into four pots based on their performances in the previous Southeast Asian Games.

The hosts Malaysia were automatically assigned into position A1, and the defending champions Thailand were automatically assigned into position B1.

| Pot 1 | Pot 2 | Pot 3 | Pot 4 |
|---|---|---|---|
| Malaysia (assigned to A1); Thailand (assigned to B1) | Myanmar; Vietnam | Indonesia; Singapore | Cambodia; Laos; Philippines; Timor-Leste; Brunei |

== Group stage ==
- All times are Malaysia Standard Time (UTC+8).

=== Group A ===
| Pos | Team | Pld | W | D | L | GF | GA | GD | Pts | Qualification |
|---|---|---|---|---|---|---|---|---|---|---|
| 1 | Malaysia (H) | 4 | 4 | 0 | 0 | 10 | 4 | +6 | 12 | Semi-finals |
| 2 | Myanmar | 4 | 3 | 0 | 1 | 12 | 4 | +8 | 9 | Semi-finals |
| 3 | Singapore | 4 | 2 | 0 | 2 | 4 | 4 | 0 | 6 | |
| 4 | Laos | 4 | 1 | 0 | 3 | 5 | 8 | −3 | 3 | |
| 5 | Brunei | 4 | 0 | 0 | 4 | 1 | 12 | −11 | 0 | |

Updated to match(es) played on 23 August 2017. Source: KL2017 Official Website
Rules for classification: 1) Points; 2) Goal difference; 3) Goals scored
(H) Hosts
14 August 2017
16:00

| Myanmar | 2–0 | Singapore |
|---|---|---|
| Aung Thu 45+1', 60' | Report |

Selayang Municipal Council Stadium, Selayang
Referee: Chen Hsin-chuan (Chinese Taipei)
14 August 2017
20:45

| Malaysia | 2–1 | Brunei |
|---|---|---|
| Safawi 4'; Adam Nor 60' | Report | Zulkhairy 12' |

Shah Alam Stadium, Shah Alam
Referee: Tejas Nagvenkar (India)

16 August 2017
20:45

| Myanmar | 3–1 | Laos |
|---|---|---|
| Aung Thu 37'; Shwe Ko 90+2'; Hlaing Bo Bo 90+4' | Report | Phommathep 60' |

UiTM Stadium, Shah Alam
Referee: Mohamed Javiz (Maldives)
16 August 2017
20:45

| Singapore | 1–2 | Malaysia |
|---|---|---|
| Amiruldin 38' | Report | Azam 68'; Thanabalan 74' |

Shah Alam Stadium, Shah Alam
Referee: Võ Minh Trí (Vietnam)

18 August 2017
16:00

| Laos | 0–2 | Singapore |
|---|---|---|
| | Report | Taufik 2'; Ikhsan 11' (pen.) |

Selayang Municipal Council Stadium, Selayang
Referee: Omar Al-Yaghoubi (Oman)
18 August 2017
16:00

| Brunei | 0–6 | Myanmar |
|---|---|---|
| | Report | Aung Thu 24'; Sithu Aung 40'; Aung Kaung Mann 73', 85'; Maung Maung Lwin 90+1'; Than Paing 90+3' |

UiTM Stadium, Shah Alam
Referee: Võ Minh Trí (Vietnam)

21 August 2017
16:00

| Brunei | 0–3 | Laos |
|---|---|---|
| | Report | Kongmathilath 64', 72', 86' |

UM Arena Stadium, Kuala Lumpur
Referee: Sudish Kumar Pandey (Nepal)
21 August 2017
20:45

| Malaysia | 3–1 | Myanmar |
|---|---|---|
| Thanabalan 33', 82'; Safawi 35' | Report | Than Paing 85' |

Shah Alam Stadium, Shah Alam
Referee: Lakmal Weerakkody (Sri Lanka)

23 August 2017
20:45

| Laos | 1–3 | Malaysia |
|---|---|---|
| Phanthavong 32' | Report | Jafri 26', 90+2'; Adib 39' |

Shah Alam Stadium, Shah Alam
Referee: Chen Hsin-chuan (Chinese Taipei)
23 August 2017
20:45

| Singapore | 1–0 | Brunei |
|---|---|---|
| Khalid 74' (o.g.) | Report |

Selayang Municipal Council Stadium, Selayang
Referee: Lakmal Weerakkody (Sri Lanka)

=== Group B ===
- All times are Malaysia Standard Time (UTC+8).

| Pos | Team | Pld | W | D | L | GF | GA | GD | Pts | Qualification |
|---|---|---|---|---|---|---|---|---|---|---|
| 1 | Thailand | 5 | 4 | 1 | 0 | 10 | 1 | +9 | 13 | Semi-finals |
| 2 | Indonesia | 5 | 3 | 2 | 0 | 7 | 1 | +6 | 11 | Semi-finals |
| 3 | Vietnam | 5 | 3 | 1 | 1 | 12 | 4 | +8 | 10 | |
| 4 | Philippines | 5 | 2 | 0 | 3 | 4 | 10 | −6 | 6 | |
| 5 | Timor-Leste | 5 | 1 | 0 | 4 | 2 | 8 | −6 | 3 | |
| 6 | Cambodia | 5 | 0 | 0 | 5 | 1 | 12 | −11 | 0 | |

Updated to match(es) played on 24 August 2017. Source: KL2017 Official Website
Rules for classification: 1) Points; 2) Goal difference; 3) Goals scored
15 August 2017
16:00

| Indonesia | 1–1 | Thailand |
|---|---|---|
| Septian 60' (pen.) | Report | Chaiyawat 14' |

Shah Alam Stadium, Shah Alam
Referee: Wang Di (China)
15 August 2017
16:00

| Vietnam | 4–0 | Timor-Leste |
|---|---|---|
| Đoàn Văn Hậu 8', 41'; Hà Đức Chinh 20'; Nguyễn Công Phượng 72' | Report |

Selayang Municipal Council Stadium, Selayang
Referee: Omar Al-Yaghoubi (Oman)
15 August 2017
20:45

| Cambodia | 0–2 | Philippines |
|---|---|---|
| | Report | Cubon 52'; Belgira 81' |

Selayang Municipal Council Stadium, Selayang
Referee: Nagor Amir Noor Mohamed (Malaysia)

17 August 2017
16:00

| Vietnam | 4–1 | Cambodia |
|---|---|---|
| Nguyễn Công Phượng 45+1', 75'; Nguyễn Quang Hải 71'; Hồ Tuấn Tài 76' | Report | N. Sothearoth 83' (pen.) |

Shah Alam Stadium, Shah Alam
Referee: Wang Di (China)
17 August 2017
20:45

| Indonesia | 3–0 | Philippines |
|---|---|---|
| Septian 6'; Hargianto 45+1'; Saddil 58' | Report |

Shah Alam Stadium, Shah Alam
Referee: Sudish Kumar Pandey (Nepal)
17 August 2017
20:45

| Thailand | 1–0 | Timor-Leste |
|---|---|---|
| Worachit 59' | Report |

Selayang Municipal Council Stadium, Selayang
Referee: Lakmal Weerakkody (Sri Lanka)

20 August 2017
16:00

| Timor-Leste | 0–1 | Indonesia |
|---|---|---|
| | Report | Marinus 22' |

Selayang Municipal Council Stadium, Selayang
Referee: Nagor Amir Noor Mohamed (Malaysia)
20 August 2017
20:45

| Thailand | 3–0 | Cambodia |
|---|---|---|
| Picha 35'; Nattawut 76' (pen.), 87' | Report |

Selayang Municipal Council Stadium, Selayang
Referee: Tejas Nagvenkar (India)
20 August 2017
20:45

| Philippines | 0–4 | Vietnam |
|---|---|---|
| | Report | Nguyễn Công Phượng 37'; Vũ Văn Thanh 45+1'; Nguyễn Văn Toàn 50'; Hồ Tuấn Tài 89' |

Shah Alam Stadium, Shah Alam
Referee: Chen Hsin-chuan (Chinese Taipei)

22 August 2017
16:00

| Philippines | 0–2 | Thailand |
|---|---|---|
| | Report | Montree 28'; Sittichok 45+1' |

Selayang Municipal Council Stadium, Selayang
Referee: Tejas Nagvenkar (India)
22 August 2017
20:45

| Vietnam | 0–0 | Indonesia |
|---|---|---|
| | Report |

Selayang Municipal Council Stadium, Selayang
Referee: Omar Al-Yaghoubi (Oman)
22 August 2017
20:45

| Cambodia | 0–1 | Timor-Leste |
|---|---|---|
| | Report | Gumario 57' |

UM Arena Stadium, Kuala Lumpur
Referee: Mohamed Javiz (Maldives)

24 August 2017
16:00

| Timor-Leste | 1–2 | Philippines |
|---|---|---|
| Rocha 45' (o.g.) | Report | Gayoso 10', 90+4' |

UM Arena Stadium, Kuala Lumpur
24 August 2017
16:00

| Indonesia | 2–0 | Cambodia |
|---|---|---|
| Ezra 56'; Febri 69' | Report |

Shah Alam Stadium, Shah Alam
Referee: Tejas Nagvenkar (India)
24 August 2017
16:00

| Thailand | 3–0 | Vietnam |
|---|---|---|
| Phitiwat 45+3'; Picha 52'; Chenrop 68' | Report |

Selayang Municipal Council Stadium, Selayang
Referee: Wang Di (China)

== Knockout stage ==
Semi-finals
26 August – Shah Alam
Malaysia | 1
Indonesia | 0
26 August – Selayang
Thailand | 1
Myanmar | 0

Gold medal match
29 August – Shah Alam
Malaysia | 0
Thailand | 1
Bronze medal match
29 August – Selayang
Indonesia | 3
Myanmar | 1

=== Semi-finals ===
26 August 2017
16:00

| Thailand | 1–0 | Myanmar |
|---|---|---|
| Chenrop 90+4' | Report |

Selayang Municipal Council Stadium, Selayang
Referee: Wang Di (China)
26 August 2017
20:45

| Malaysia | 1–0 | Indonesia |
|---|---|---|
| Thanabalan 86' | Report |

Shah Alam Stadium, Shah Alam
Referee: Lakmal Weerakkody (Sri Lanka)

=== Bronze medal match ===
29 August 2017
16:30

| Indonesia | 3–1 | Myanmar |
|---|---|---|
| Evan 55'; Septian 58'; Rezaldi 76' | Report | Than Paing 21' |

Selayang Municipal Council Stadium, Selayang
Referee: Sudish Kumar Pandey (Nepal)

=== Gold medal match ===
29 August 2017
20:45

| Malaysia | 0–1 | Thailand |
|---|---|---|
| | Report | Haziq 39' (o.g.) |

Shah Alam Stadium, Shah Alam
Referee: Chen Hsin-chuan (Chinese Taipei)

== Winners ==
2017 SEA Games Men's Tournament
(Thailand)
Thailand
Sixteenth title

== Goalscorers ==
4 goals

- (Malaysia) Thanabalan Nadarajah
- (Myanmar) Aung Thu
- (Vietnam) Nguyễn Công Phượng

3 goals

- (Indonesia) Septian David
- (Laos) Phithack Kongmathilath
- (Myanmar) Than Paing

2 goals

- (Malaysia) Jafri Firdaus Chew
- (Malaysia) Safawi Rasid
- (Myanmar) Aung Kaung Mann
- (Philippines) Javier Gayoso
- (Thailand) Chenrop Samphaodi
- (Thailand) Nattawut Sombatyotha
- (Thailand) Picha Autra
- (Vietnam) Đoàn Văn Hậu
- (Vietnam) Hồ Tuấn Tài

1 goal

- (Brunei) Zulkhairy Razali
- (Cambodia) Nen Sothearoth
- (Indonesia) Evan Dimas
- (Indonesia) Ezra Walian
- (Indonesia) Febri Haryadi
- (Indonesia) Marinus Wanewar
- (Indonesia) Muhammad Hargianto
- (Indonesia) Rezaldi Hehanusa
- (Indonesia) Saddil Ramdani
- (Laos) Phathana Phommathep
- (Laos) Thanin Phanthavong
- (Malaysia) Adam Nor
- (Malaysia) Adib Zainuddin
- (Malaysia) Nor Azam Azih
- (Myanmar) Hlaing Bo Bo
- (Myanmar) Maung Maung Lwin
- (Myanmar) Shwe Ko
- (Myanmar) Sithu Aung
- (Philippines) Kouichi Belgira
- (Philippines) Reymart Cubon
- (Singapore) Amiruldin Asraf
- (Singapore) Ikhsan Fandi
- (Singapore) Taufik Suparno
- (Thailand) Chaiyawat Buran
- (Thailand) Montree Promsawat
- (Thailand) Phitiwat Sukjitthammakul
- (Thailand) Sittichok Kannoo
- (Thailand) Worachit Kanitsribampen
- (Timor-Leste) Gumario Moreira
- (Vietnam) Hà Đức Chinh
- (Vietnam) Nguyễn Quang Hải
- (Vietnam) Nguyễn Văn Toàn
- (Vietnam) Vũ Văn Thanh

Own goal

- (Brunei) Khalid Wassadisalleh Mahmud
- (Malaysia) Norman Haikal Rendra Iskandar
- (Philippines) Jeremiah Raphael Rocha

== Final ranking ==
| Pos | Team | Pld | W | D | L | GF | GA | GD | Pts | Final result |
|---|---|---|---|---|---|---|---|---|---|---|
| 1 | Thailand | 7 | 6 | 1 | 0 | 12 | 1 | +11 | 19 | Gold Medal |
| 2 | Malaysia (H) | 6 | 5 | 0 | 1 | 11 | 5 | +6 | 15 | Silver Medal |
| 3 | Indonesia | 7 | 4 | 2 | 1 | 10 | 3 | +7 | 14 | Bronze Medal |
| 4 | Myanmar | 6 | 3 | 0 | 3 | 13 | 8 | +5 | 9 | Fourth place |
| 5 | Vietnam | 5 | 3 | 1 | 1 | 12 | 4 | +8 | 10 | Eliminated in group stage |
| 6 | Singapore | 4 | 2 | 0 | 2 | 4 | 4 | 0 | 6 | Eliminated in group stage |
| 7 | Philippines | 5 | 2 | 0 | 3 | 4 | 10 | −6 | 6 | Eliminated in group stage |
| 8 | Laos | 4 | 1 | 0 | 3 | 5 | 8 | −3 | 3 | Eliminated in group stage |
| 9 | Timor-Leste | 5 | 1 | 0 | 4 | 2 | 8 | −6 | 3 | Eliminated in group stage |
| 10 | Cambodia | 5 | 0 | 0 | 5 | 1 | 12 | −11 | 0 | Eliminated in group stage |
| 11 | Brunei | 4 | 0 | 0 | 4 | 1 | 12 | −11 | 0 | Eliminated in group stage |

(H) Hosts

== See also ==
- Women's tournament
