= Hồ Tuấn Tài =

Vietnamese footballer (born 1995)

- Tuấn Tài in 2019

Personal information
- Full name: Hồ Tuấn Tài
- Date of birth: 16 March 1995 (age 31)
- Place of birth: Hưng Nguyên, Nghệ An, Vietnam
- Height: 1.75 m (5 ft 9 in)
- Position: Forward

Team information
- Current team: Đồng Nai City
- Number: 66

Youth career
- 2011–2014: Sông Lam Nghệ An

Senior career*
Years	Team	Apps	(Gls)
2015–2020	Sông Lam Nghệ An	87	(22)
2021–2024	Hồ Chí Minh City	37	(3)
2024–	Đồng Nai City	15	(2)
2025–2026	→ Becamex Hồ Chí Minh City (loan)	10	(0)

International career^{‡}
2014–2015	Vietnam U19	15	(10)
2014–2016	Vietnam U21	18	(6)
2016–2017	Vietnam U23	20	(4)
2017	Vietnam	1	(0)
- * Club domestic league appearances and goals as of 7 June 2026 ‡ National team caps and goals as of 22 March 2017

Hồ Tuấn Tài (born 16 March 1995) is a Vietnamese professional footballer who plays as a forward for V-League 1 club Đồng Nai City.

== Club career ==
Tuấn Tài began his career at Sông Lam Nghệ An, before moving to Hồ Chí Minh City. He became known in 2014 when he played for U19 KHI in international U19 tournaments.

== International career ==
On 22 March 2017, Tuấn Tài made his debut for the Vietnam national team when he started in a friendly match against Chinese Taipei at Hàng Đẫy Stadium.

On 22 August 2017, after the 0–0 draw with Indonesia U23 in the 2017 SEA Games with many missed scoring opportunities, Hồ Tuấn Tài's personal Facebook was bombarded with criticism from the online community and this Wikipedia page was vandalized by fans to vent their anger.

== Personal life ==
Hồ Tuấn Tài was born in Nghệ An and is a cousin of Phạm Văn Quyến.

== International career ==
=== International goals ===
==== U-19 ====
#	Date	Venue	Opponent	Score	Result	Competition
1	9 August 2014	Track & Field Sports Complex, Brunei	Singapore	1–0	4–0	2014 Hassanal Bolkiah Trophy
2	9 August 2014	Track & Field Sports Complex, Brunei	Singapore	2–0	4–0	2014 Hassanal Bolkiah Trophy
3	18 August 2014	Track & Field Sports Complex, Brunei	Cambodia	1–0	3–0	2014 Hassanal Bolkiah Trophy
4	18 August 2014	Track & Field Sports Complex, Brunei	Cambodia	2–0	3–0	2014 Hassanal Bolkiah Trophy
5	23 August 2014	Hassanal Bolkiah National Stadium, Brunei	Myanmar	2–1	3–4	2014 Hassanal Bolkiah Trophy

==== U-22 ====
#	Date	Venue	Opponent	Score	Result	Competition
1	17 August 2017	Shah Alam Stadium, Malaysia	Cambodia	4–0	4–1	2017 Southeast Asian Games
2	20 August 2017	Shah Alam Stadium, Malaysia	Philippines	4–0	4–0	2017 Southeast Asian Games

== Honours ==
Sông Lam Nghệ An

- Vietnamese National Cup: 2017
- Vietnamese Super Cup: Runner-up: 2018
