= Montree Promsawat =

Thai footballer (born 1995)

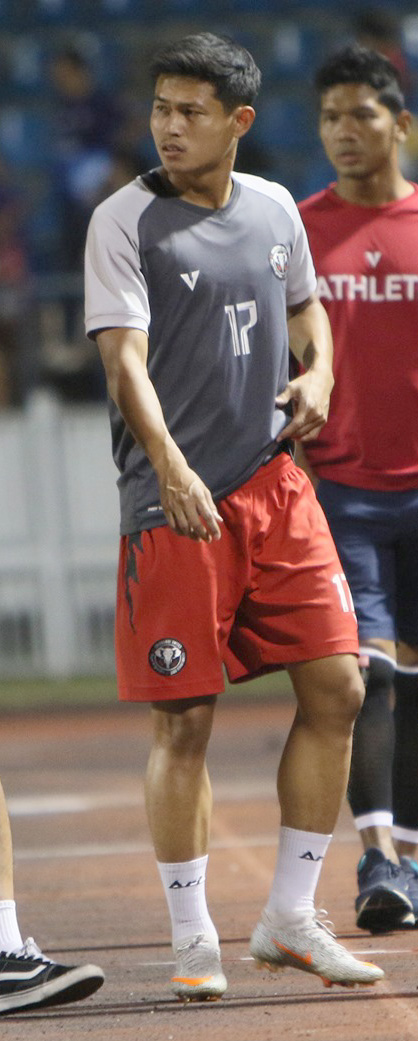

Personal information
- Full name: Montree Promsawat
- Date of birth: 27 August 1995 (age 31)
- Place of birth: Phichit, Thailand
- Height: 1.72 m (5 ft 7 1/2 in)
- Position: Winger

Team information
- Current team: Chiangrai United
- Number: 32

Youth career
- 2010–2012: Nakhon Sawan Sports School
- 2013: Nakhon Sawan

Senior career*
Years	Team	Apps	(Gls)
2014–2016	Bangkok	40	(7)
2017–2022	Ratchaburi Mitr Phol	49	(5)
2020	→ Chiangmai United (loan)	5	(0)
2020	→ Muangkan United (loan)	13	(3)
2022–	Chiangrai United	87	(3)

International career^{‡}
2015–2016	Thailand U19	10	(3)
2016	Thailand U21	3	(0)
2016–2018	Thailand U23	9	(1)
Medal record
Thailand under-21
Nations Cup
Winner	Nations Cup 2016	Football
Thailand under-23
Southeast Asian Games
Gold medal – first place	Sea Games 2017	Football
- * Club domestic league appearances and goals as of 9 January 2026 ‡ National team caps and goals as of 16 August 2018

Montree Promsawat (Thai: มนตรี พรมสวัสดิ์, born 27 August 1995) is a Thai professional footballer who plays as a winger for Thai League 1 club Chiangrai United .

== International career ==
In August 2017, he won the Football at the 2017 Southeast Asian Games with Thailand U23.

== International Goals ==
=== U23 ===
Montree Promsawat – goals for Thailand U23
No	Date	Venue	Opponent	Score	Result	Competition
1.	22 August 2017	Selayang, Malaysia	Philippines	1–0	2–0	2017 Southeast Asian Games

== Honours ==
=== International ===
Thailand U-23

- SEA Games Gold Medal (1); 2017

Thailand U-21

- Nations Cup (1): 2016
