= Adisak Srikampang =

Thai footballer

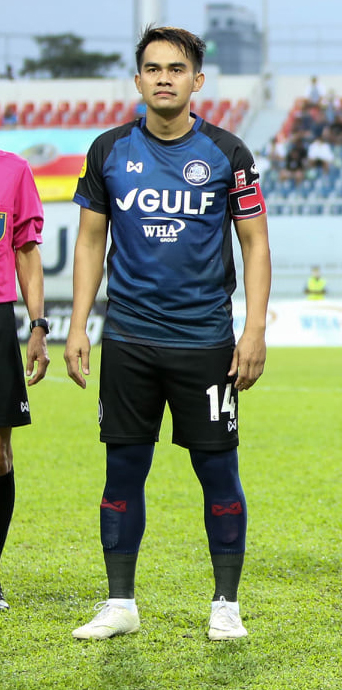
- Adisak Srikampang playing for Rayong.

Personal information
- Full name: Adisak Srikampang
- Date of birth: 14 January 1985 (age 41)
- Place of birth: Rayong, Thailand
- Height: 1.75 m (5 ft 9 in)
- Position: Forward

Youth career
- 2005: Rayong

Senior career*
Years	Team	Apps	(Gls)
2006–2010	Rayong	59	(19)
2011–2014	PTT Rayong	42	(21)
2015–2016	Ratchaburi Mitr Phol	37	(4)
2016	→ Ubon UMT United (loan)	3	(0)
2016	Ubon UMT United	10	(6)
2017	Chonburi	2	(0)
2017	→ Songkhla United (loan)	12	(0)
2018–2021	Police Tero	59	(11)
2021–2022	Rayong	31	(6)
Total		255	(67)

Managerial career
- 2022–: Rayong (assistant)
- * Club domestic league appearances and goals as of 14 November 2021

Adisak Srikampang (Thai: อดิศักดิ์ ศรีกำปัง, born January 14, 1985), simply known as Ae (Thai: เอ๋), is a Thai football coach and former professional football player who played as a forward, he is currently assistant coach of Rayong.

== Personal life ==
Adisak's brother Sila Srikampang is also a footballer and plays as a right back.
