= Takafumi Akahoshi =

Japanese football player

Takafumi Akahoshi 赤星 貴文
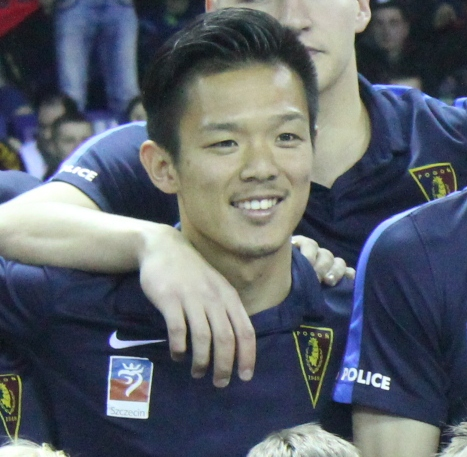
- Akahoshi with Pogoń Szczecin in 2016

Personal information
- Date of birth: 27 May 1986 (age 40)
- Place of birth: Fuji, Shizuoka, Japan
- Height: 1.75 m (5 ft 9 in)
- Position: Midfielder

Youth career
- 2002–2004: Fujieda Higashi High School

Senior career*
Years	Team	Apps	(Gls)
2005–2009	Urawa Red Diamonds	2	(0)
2008	→ Mito HollyHock (loan)	41	(8)
2009	→ Montedio Yamagata (loan)	8	(0)
2010	Zweigen Kanazawa	15	(1)
2010	Liepājas Metalurgs	15	(6)
2011–2014	Pogoń Szczecin	103	(15)
2014–2015	Ufa	2	(0)
2015	→ Pogoń Szczecin (loan)	12	(0)
2015	→ Pogoń Szczecin II (loan)	2	(0)
2015–2016	Pogoń Szczecin	41	(5)
2016	Pogoń Szczecin II	4	(0)
2016–2017	Ratchaburi Mitr Phol	29	(3)
2017–2018	Suphanburi	32	(2)
2018–2019	Foolad	12	(1)
2019–2020	Arema	13	(0)
2021–2023	Gakunan F Mosuperio		
- * Club domestic league appearances and goals

Takafumi Akahoshi (赤星 貴文, Akahoshi Takafumi; born 27 May 1986) is a Japanese former professional footballer who played as a midfielder.

== Career ==
In 2010, Akahoshi joined Latvian side Liepājas Metalurgs. Soon after joining the team, he became a vital figure in its starting eleven and made several excellent appearances. He scored his first goal for Liepāja in a 4–2 league victory against FK Ventspils on 22 August 2010. He made 15 appearances in the LMT Virsliga, scored six times and became the fourth top scorer in Metalurgs' team. He also played one domestic cup match, when Metalurgs were beaten by FK Jelgava and one Champions League qualification match, when Metalurgs were once again beaten - this time by Sparta Praha from the Czech Republic. He was also included in the 2010 LMT Virsliga team of the season. The club finished the league in the third place. After that season he was released by Metalurgs, as the club intended that he had to play in a bit higher level the next year. In January 2011, he joined Pogoń Szczecin.

=== Ufa ===
In July 2014, Akahoshi signed a three-year contract with Russian Premier League side Ufa, making his debut as a half-time substitute against Zenit St.Petersburg on 16 August 2014. After only three appearances for Ufa, Akahoshi rejoined Pogoń Szczecin on loan until the end of the 2014–15 season in February 2015. On 8 June 2015, Akahoshi left Ufa by mutual consent.

=== Return to Pogoń Szczecin ===
On termination of his deal with Ufa, Akahoshi immediately rejoined Pogoń Szczecin.

=== Arema ===
On 24 August 2019, Indonesian club Arema announced Akahoshi as their new player, filling their Asian foreign player slot. He made his debut in a 1–1 home draw against PSIS Semarang on 31 August, appearing as a second-half substitute.

== Career statistics ==
As of match played 29 October 2014

Appearances and goals by club, season and competition
Club	Season	League			National cup (Note: Includes Emperor's Cup, Latvian Cup, Polish Cup, Russian Cup)		League cup (Note: Includes J. League Cup)		Continental		Total	
Club	Season	Division	Apps	Goals	Apps	Goals	Apps	Goals	Apps	Goals	Apps	Goals
Urawa Red Diamonds	2005	J1 League	2	0	3	0	1	0	—		6	0
Urawa Red Diamonds	2006	J1 League	0	0	0	0	4	0	—		4	0
Urawa Red Diamonds	2007	J1 League	0	0	0	0	0	0	—		0	0
Urawa Red Diamonds	2009	J1 League	0	0	0	0	3	0	—		3	0
Urawa Red Diamonds	Total		2	0	3	0	8	0	—		13	0
Mito HollyHock (loan)	2008	J2 League	41	8	2	0	—		—		43	8
Montedio Yamagata (loan)	2009	J1 League	8	0	1	1	0	0	—		9	1
Zweigen Kanazawa	2010	Japan Football League	15	1	0	0	0	0	—		15	1
Liepājas Metalurgs	2010	Latvian Higher League	15	6	1	0	0	0	1 (Note: Appearance in UEFA Champions League)	0	17	6
Pogoń Szczecin	2010–11	I liga	13	3	0	0	—		—		13	3
Pogoń Szczecin	2011–12	I liga	28	3	1	0	—		—		29	3
Pogoń Szczecin	2012–13	Ekstraklasa	27	2	1	0	—		—		27	2
Pogoń Szczecin	2013–14	Ekstraklasa	35	7	1	0	—		—		35	7
Pogoń Szczecin	Total		103	15	3	0	—		—		106	15
Ufa	2014–15	Russian Premier League	2	0	1	0	—		—		3	0
Career total			171	29	11	1	8	0	1	0	191	30

== Honours ==
Urawa Red Diamonds

- J1 League: 2006
- Emperor's Cup: 2005, 2006
