= Pawee Tanthatemee =

Thai footballer (born 1996)

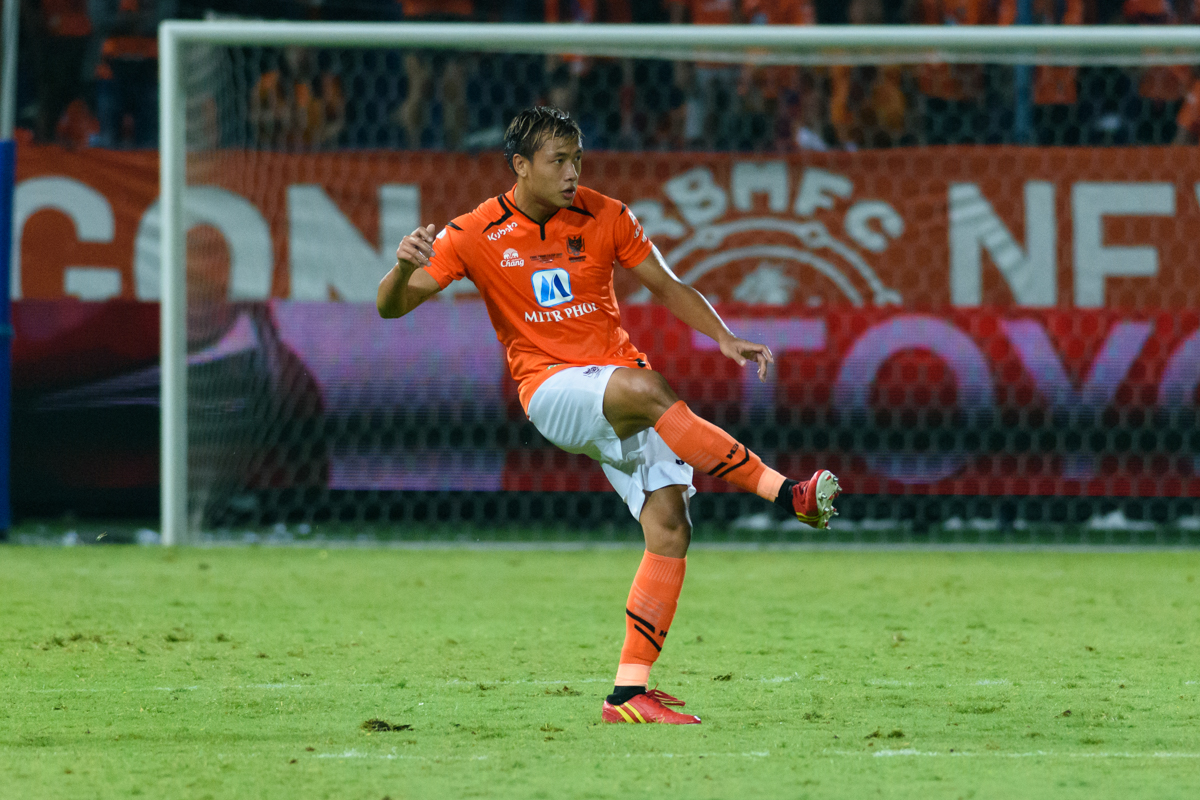
- Tanthatemee playing for Ratchaburi Mitr Phol in 2019

Personal information
- Full name: Pawee Tanthatemee
- Date of birth: 22 October 1996 (age 30)
- Place of birth: Ratchaburi, Thailand
- Height: 1.87 m (6 ft 2 in)
- Position: Centre back

Team information
- Current team: BG Pathum United

Youth career
- 2012: Patumkongka School
- 2013: Suankularb Wittayalai Nonthaburi School
- 2014: Bangkok Christian College
- 2015–2016: Ratchaburi Mitr Phol

Senior career*
Years	Team	Apps	(Gls)
2016–2023	Ratchaburi Mitr Phol	98	(2)
2018	→ Ubon UMT United (loan)	14	(0)
2023–2025	PT Prachuap	39	(0)
2025–2026	Kanchanaburi Power	9	(1)
2026–	BG Pathum United	0	(0)

International career^{‡}
2016	Thailand U21	2	(1)
2018	Thailand U23	2	(0)
2019–2022	Thailand	4	(0)
Medal record
Thailand
Asean Football Championship
Winner	AFF Suzuki Cup 2020	2020
- * Club domestic league appearances and goals ‡ National team caps and goals as of 18 December 2021

Pawee Tanthatemee (Thai: ปวีร์ ตัณฑะเตมีย์, born 22 October 1996) is a Thai professional footballer who plays as a centre back for Thai League 1 club BG Pathum United and the Thailand national team.

== International career ==
In June 2019.he was in the squad of Thailand for 2019 King's Cup.

In 2021 he was called up by Thailand national team for the 2020 AFF Championship.

== Career statistics ==
=== International ===
As of 1 January 2022

National team	Year	Apps	Goals
Thailand	2019	2	0
Thailand	2021	1	0
Thailand	2022	1	0
Thailand	Total	4	0

== International goals ==
=== Under-21 ===
Pawee Tanthatemee – goals for Thailand U21
#	Date	Venue	Opponent	Score	Result	Competition
1.	3 June 2016	Krubong, Malaysia	Vietnam	2–0	2–0	2016 Nations Cup

== Honours ==
=== International ===
Thailand

- AFF Championship (1): 2020

Thailand U-21

- Nations Cup (1): 2016
