= Kritnaphop Mekpatcharakul =

Thai footballer (born 1983)

Personal information
- Full name: Kritnaphop Mekpatcharakul
- Date of birth: 26 August 1983 (age 43)
- Place of birth: Thailand
- Height: 1.75 m (5 ft 9 in)
- Position: Defender

Senior career*
Years	Team	Apps	(Gls)
2013–2017	Army United	19	(2)
2013–2015	→ TOT (loan)	56	(5)
2016	→ Ratchaburi Mitr Phol (loan)	7	(0)
2018	Deffo		
2018–	Uttaradit		
- * Club domestic league appearances and goals as of 31 October 2015

Kritnaphop Mekpatcharakul (Thai: กฤตณภพ เมฆพัชรกุล, born 26 August 1983), simply known as Porn (Thai: พร), is a Thai professional footballer who plays as a defender.
