= Siwarut Pholhirun =

Thai footballer (born 1996)

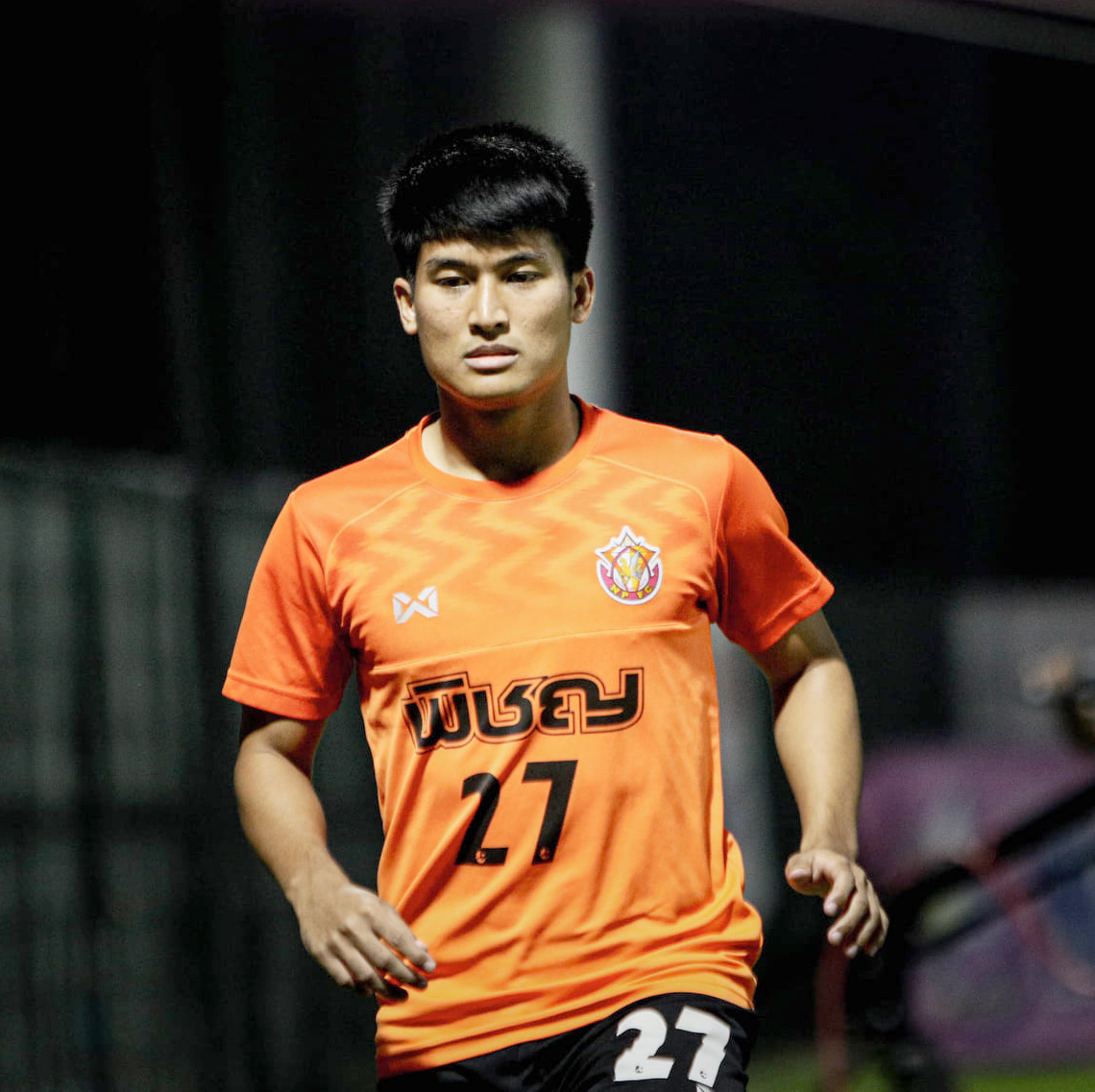

Personal information
- Full name: Siwarut Pholhirun
- Date of birth: 23 September 1996 (age 30)
- Place of birth: Nakhon Si Thammarat, Thailand
- Height: 1.70 m (5 ft 7 in)
- Position: Winger

Team information
- Current team: Nakhon Si United
- Number: 98

Youth career
- 2012–2014: Ratchaburi Mitr Phol

Senior career*
Years	Team	Apps	(Gls)
2015–2019	Ratchaburi Mitr Phol	26	(1)
2015	→ RBAC (loan)	12	(2)
2017	→ Bangkok United (loan)	6	(0)
2018	→ Buriram United (loan)	1	(0)
2019	→ Sisaket (loan)	12	(0)
2019	→ Sukhothai (loan)	7	(0)
2020	Sukhothai	1	(0)
2021	Nongbua Pitchaya	12	(0)
2021–	Nakhon Si United	67	(8)
- * Club domestic league appearances and goals as of 3 April 2026

Siwarut Pholhirun (Thai: ศิวรุต ผลหิรัญ, born September 23, 1996), is a Thai professional footballer who plays as a winger for Thai League 2 club Nakhon Si United.
