= Marcel Essombé =

Cameroonian footballer

Personal information
- Full name: Marcel Josué Essombé
- Date of birth: 6 May 1988 (age 38)
- Place of birth: Douala, Cameroon
- Height: 1.86 m (6 ft 1 in)
- Position: Striker

Team information
- Current team: Pacy-sur-Eure

Senior career*
Years	Team	Apps	(Gls)
2006–2008	Sochaux B	13	(6)
2008–2009	Jura Sud	24	(10)
2009–2011	Pacy-sur-Eure	55	(17)
2011–2013	Châteauroux	40	(4)
2012	→ Créteil (loan)	16	(5)
2013–2015	Créteil	62	(8)
2015–2016	Dinamo București	23	(7)
2017	Ratchaburi Mitr Phol	31	(20)
2018	Ermis Aradippou	5	(0)
2019–	Pacy-sur-Eure	2	(0)
- * Club domestic league appearances and goals as of 22:31, 19 January 2020 (UTC)

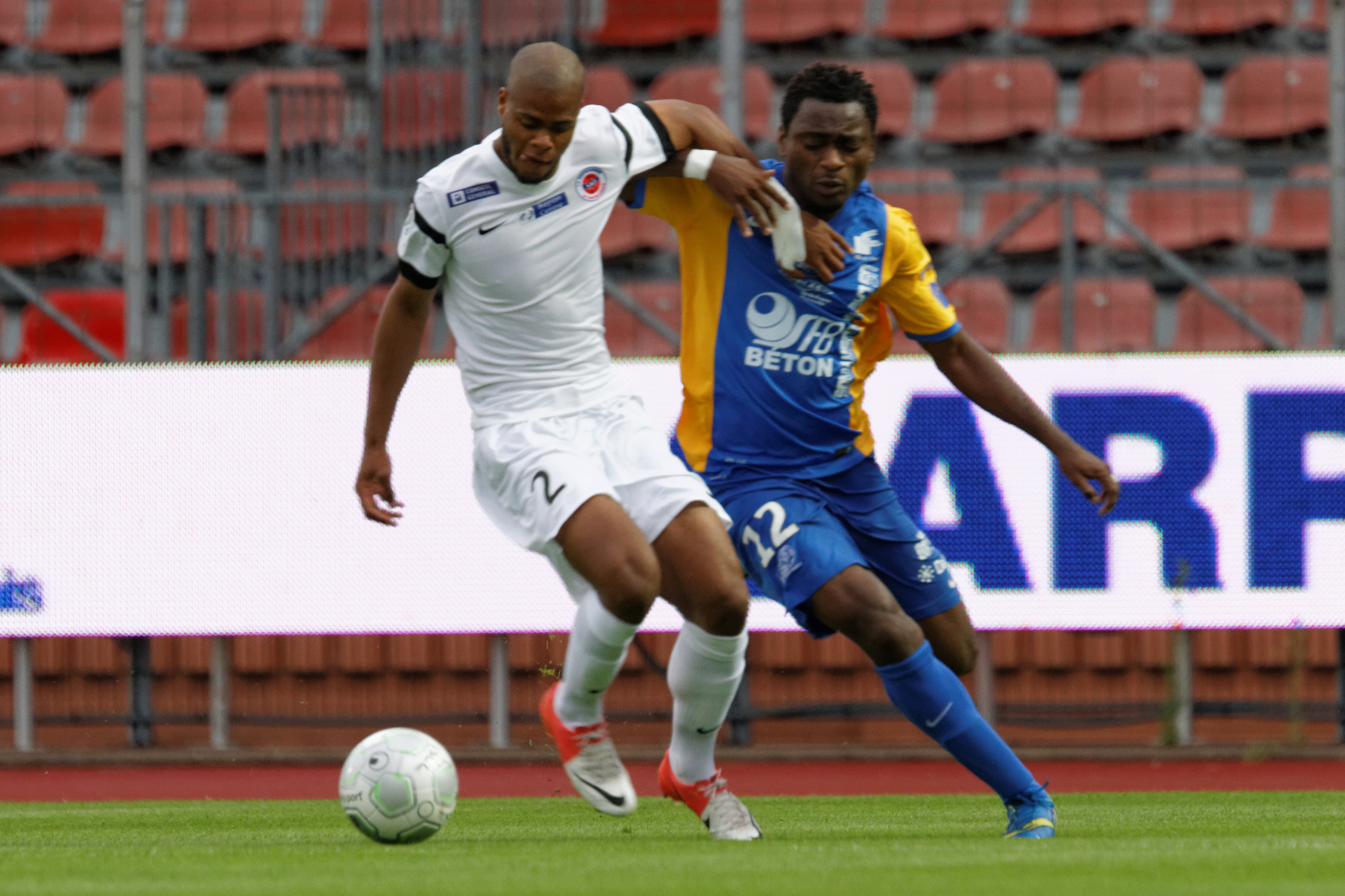

Marcel Josué Essombé (born 6 May 1988) is a Cameroonian professional footballer who plays as a striker for French club Pacy Vallée-d'Eure.

== Career ==
=== Club ===
Essombé was born in Douala. He started his career in the reserve team at FC Sochaux-Montbéliard and scored 6 goals in 13 appearances in the Championnat de France amateur (CFA) between 2006 and 2008.

Essombé joined CFA Group B club Jura Sud in the summer of 2008 and made his debut on 27 August, coming on as a substitute for Nicolas Stevanovic in the 0–2 defeat away at FC Villefranche. Essombé scored his first goal for Jura Sud in the following match, a 2–0 win against Monaco B. He went on to score 10 league goals in the 2008–09 season, including the winner in the 2–1 victory over Sporting Toulon Var on 15 April.

On 11 June 2009, Essombé signed for Championnat National side Pacy-sur-Eure. He scored on his debut for Pacy, netting the first goal in a 1–1 draw with Beauvais. In total, Essombé played 20 league matches in the 2009–10 season and scored six goals, including two in the 5–2 win against SO Cassis Carnoux on 4 May 2010. He was a first-team regular during the following campaign, scoring 11 goals in 33 starts. During January and February 2011 he scored in four consecutive league matches, although the team did not win any of the games. Essombé made his final appearance for Pacy in the 1–1 draw with Plabennec on 27 May 2011.

It was announced on 30 May 2011 that Essombé had agreed a transfer to Beauvais. However, three weeks later it emerged that the contract between Essombé and the club had been cancelled, and the transfer would not go through. Shortly afterwards, it was confirmed that Essombé had signed a two-year contract with Ligue 2 side LB Châteauroux. He made nine appearances for his new club during the first half of the 2011–12 season, eight of them as a substitute, but failed to score. On 16 January 2012, Essombé joined National club Créteil on a six-month loan deal.

== Honours ==
=== Individual ===
- DigiSport Liga I Player of the Month: February 2016
