= 2016 Nations Cup =

Tournament details
- Host country: Malaysia
- Dates: 3–5 June
- Teams: 4 (from 1 confederation)
- Venue(s): 1 (in 1 host city)

Final positions
- Champions: Thailand (1st title)
- Runners-up: Malaysia
- Third place: Vietnam
- Fourth place: Singapore

Tournament statistics
- Matches played: 4
- Goals scored: 12 (3 per match)

The 2016 Nations Cup was the inaugural edition of the Nations Cup hosted in Malacca City, Malaysia from 3 to 5 June 2016. It was organised by MP & Silva with the under-21 teams of Malaysia, Singapore and Thailand as well as the Vietnam U-19 team, participating in the tournament. All matches were held at the Hang Jebat Stadium.

Thailand won the title by defeating hosts Malaysia 2–1 in the final.

== Venue ==
Krubong
Hang Jebat Stadium	2016 Nations Cup (Malaysia)
Capacity: 40,000	2016 Nations Cup (Malaysia)

== Brackets ==
Semi-finals
3 June
Thailand	2
Vietnam	0
3 June
Malaysia	3
Singapore	0

Final
5 June
Thailand	2
Malaysia	1
Third place
5 June
Vietnam	2 (5)
Singapore	2 (4)

== Semi-finals ==
3 June 2016
16:45 UTC+8

Thailand	2 – 0	Vietnam
Nattawut 6'; Pawee 72'	Report

Hang Jebat Stadium, Krubong
Referee: Zulkifli Ahmad
3 June 2016
20:45 UTC+8

Malaysia	3 – 0	Singapore
Safawi 4'; Syafiq 52'; Shamie 83'	Report

Hang Jebat Stadium, Krubong
Attendance: 2,000

== Third place play-off ==
5 June 2016
16:45 UTC+8

Vietnam	2 – 2	Singapore
Huỳnh Tấn Sinh 56'; Hà Đức Chinh 90'	Report	Adam 41'; Hazim 51'
Penalties
Hà Đức Chinh (penalty missed); Nguyễn Trọng Đại (penalty scored); Bùi Tiến Dụng (penalty scored); Huỳnh Tấn Sinh (penalty scored); Hồ Tấn Tài (penalty scored); Đoàn Văn Hậu (penalty scored)	5 – 4	(penalty missed) Ammirul; (penalty scored) Adam; (penalty scored) Dhukilan; (penalty scored) Hami; (penalty scored) Amiruldin; (penalty missed) Shahrin

Hang Jebat Stadium, Krubong

== Final ==
5 June 2016
22:00 UTC+8

Thailand	2 – 1	Malaysia
Worawut 3'; Chenrop 79'	Report	Shamie 35'

Hang Jebat Stadium, Krubong
