= Takuya Murayama =

Japanese footballer

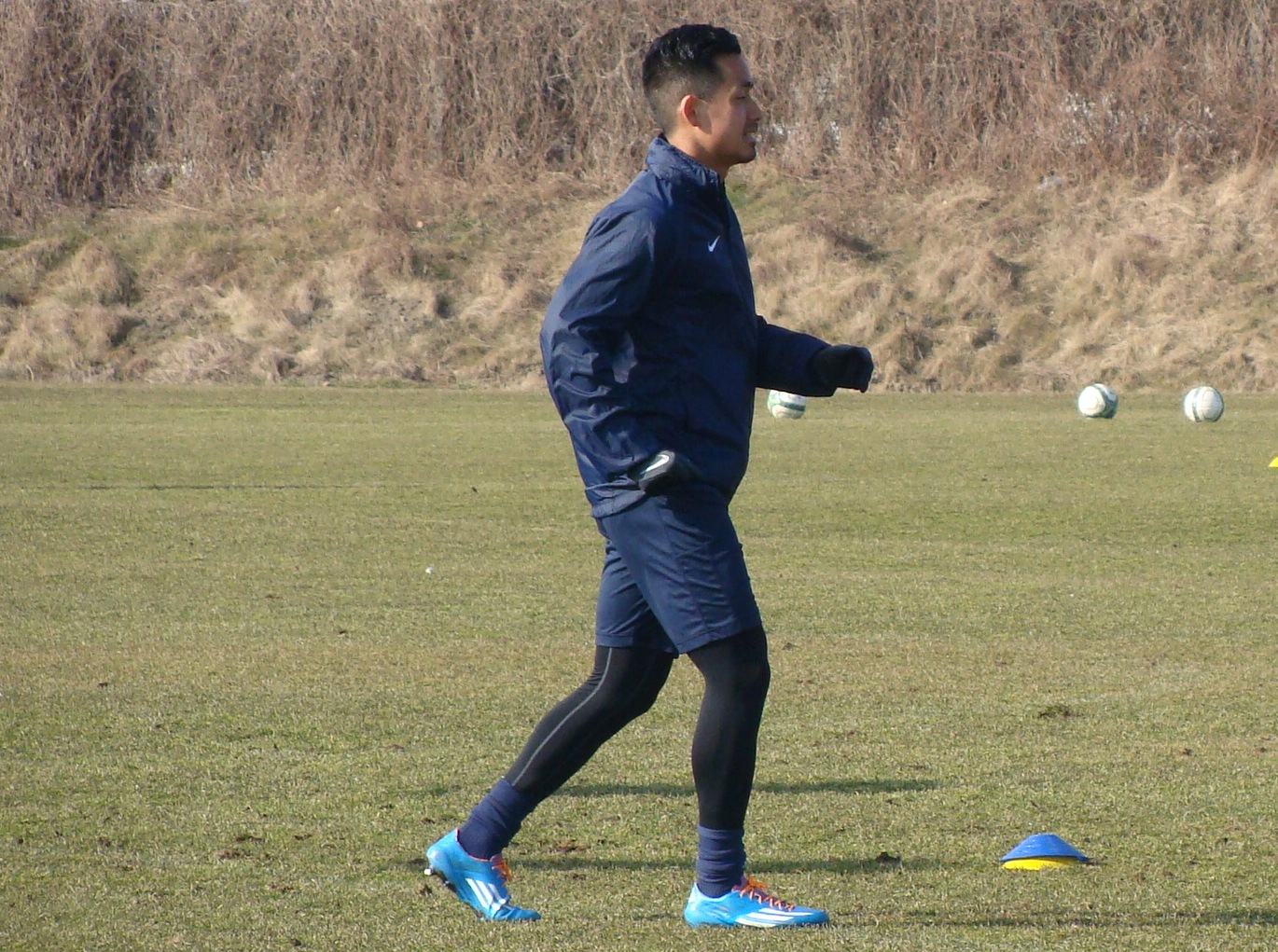
- Murayama in 2014

Personal information
- Date of birth: 8 August 1989 (age 37)
- Place of birth: Osaka, Japan
- Height: 1.77 m (5 ft 10 in)
- Position: Right winger

Youth career
- Kumiyama High School
- 2010–2011: Hannan University

Senior career*
| Years | Team | Apps | (Gls) |
| 2012 | Gwardia Koszalin | 15 | (5) |
| 2013–2015 | Pogoń Szczecin | 78 | (9) |
| 2016 | Ratchaburi | 20 | (2) |
| 2018 | Zemun | 5 | (0) |
| 2019 | Hapoel Petah Tikva | 10 | (1) |
| 2020 | Hapoel Acre | 14 | (1) |
| Total | | 141 | (18) |
- * Club domestic league appearances and goals

Takuya Murayama (村山 拓哉, Murayama Takuya; born 8 August 1989) is a Japanese former professional footballer who played as a right winger.

== Career ==
Murayama played at Kumiyama High School and Hannan University in Japan, before coming to Poland where, after playing half-season with Gwardia Koszalin, he joined Pogoń Szczecin and played three whole years with them. Next, he had a spell in Thailand where he played with Ratchaburi in 2016.

In summer 2018 he was back in Europe, this time by signing with Serbian SuperLiga side FK Zemun. In January 2019 Murayama signed a contract with Hapoel Petah Tikva of the Israeli second tier league.

== Honours ==
Ratchaburi

- Thai FA Cup: 2016
