= Sila Srikampang =

Thai footballer (born 1989)

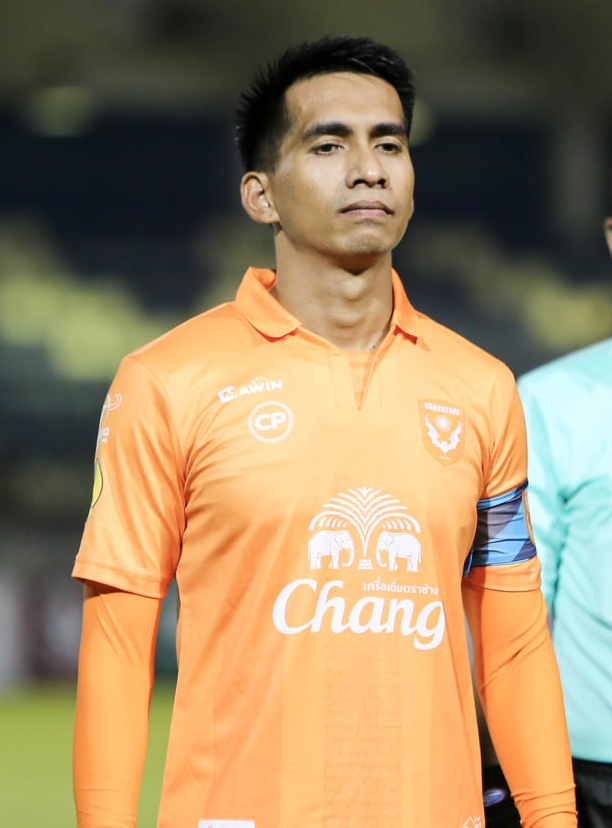
- Sila Srikampang playing for Sukhothai

Personal information
- Full name: Sila Srikampang
- Date of birth: 18 April 1989 (age 37)
- Place of birth: Rayong, Thailand
- Height: 1.77 m (5 ft 9 1/2 in)
- Position: Right-back

Youth career
- 2009: Rayong

Senior career*
Years	Team	Apps	(Gls)
2010–2019	Ratchaburi Mitr Phol	146	(2)
2020–2023	Sukhothai	79	(7)
2023–2024	Lamphun Warriors	10	(0)
2023–2024	Samut Sakhon City	3	(0)
2025	Kanchanaburi Power	5	(0)

International career
2015	Thailand	1	(0)
- * Club domestic league appearances and goals

Sila Srikampang (Thai: ศิลา ศรีกำปัง, born April 18, 1989) is a Thai professional footballer who last plays as a right back for Thai League 2 club Kanchanaburi Power and the Thailand national team.

== Personal life ==
Sila's brother Adisak Srikampang is also a footballer and plays as a forward.

== International career ==
In June 2015, Sila debuted for Thailand against Bahrain in a friendly match.

=== International ===
As of 12 November 2015

National team	Year	Apps	Goals
Thailand	2015	1	0
Thailand	Total	1	0
