= Sompong Soleb =

Thai footballer (born 1986)

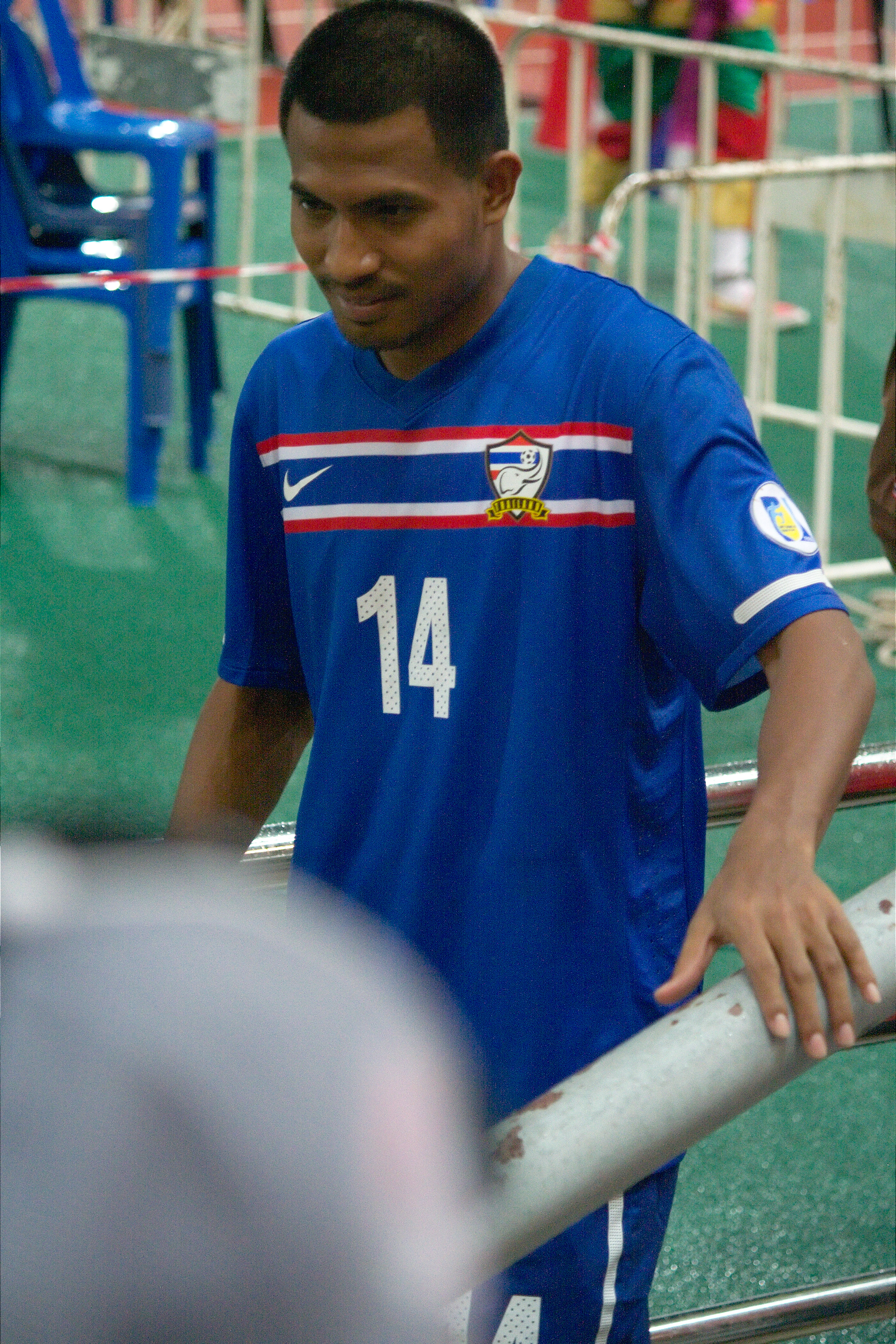

Personal information
- Full name: Sompong Soleb
- Date of birth: 30 July 1986 (age 40)
- Place of birth: Satun, Thailand
- Height: 1.82 m (5 ft 11 1/2 in)
- Position: Forward

Youth career
- 2001–2003: Bangkok Christian College
- 2003: Everton

Senior career*
Years	Team	Apps	(Gls)
2004–2006	Satun	59	(33)
2007	Thai Port	22	(4)
2008–2009	BBCU	43	(18)
2010–2011	Thai Port	37	(12)
2011	Buriram	11	(1)
2012–2019	Bangkok United	81	(17)
2015	→ Port (loan)	11	(0)
2016	→ Super Power (loan)	26	(3)
2017–2019	→ Ratchaburi Mitr Phol (loan)	40	(9)
2019	→ Chonburi (loan)	2	(0)
2020	Kasetsart	4	(2)
2020	Chamchuri United	18	(5)
2021	MOF Customs United	10	(3)
2021–2022	Sukhothai	16	(0)
2022–2023	Chamchuri United	17	(1)
2023	Customs United	7	(0)
Total		404	(108)

International career
2006–2009	Thailand U23	16	(9)
2010–2014	Thailand	18	(2)
Medal record
Thailand
Asean Football Championship
Runner-up	AFF Suzuki Cup 2012	2012
Winner	AFF Suzuki Cup 2014	2014
- * Club domestic league appearances and goals

Sompong Soleb (Thai: สมปอง สอเหลบ; born 30 July 1986), simply known as Pong (Thai: ปอง) is a Thai retired professional footballer who plays as a forward. He debuted for the senior Thailand national football team in 2010.

He played in the 2010 Thai League Cup final and won a winner's medal after Thai Port defeated Buriram PEA 2–1.

Back in 2004, Sompong Soleb was one of three Thais selected from over 500 player to spend a year training with Everton. The selection process was part of a reality TV show funded by Everton's main sponsor Chang Beer, with Everton's youth academy director Ray Hall helping judge the competition.

== Club career ==
His career began with third division side Satun United In 2004, he participated in a football talent show. The main prize was a nine-month stay in the youth academy of the English club Everton Together with Rattapon Piyawuttisakun and Teerathep Winothai he won this award. In April 2005, he took part in a three weeks trial at Chester City. The club was also willing to give him a contract. but it probably came from labor reasons for any contract with the club. Back in Thailand, he played until the end of 2006 for his hometown club before he moved to Thai League 1 side Port Authority in 2007. He scored only four goals in 22 matches of the 2008 season and left to Chula United, for whom he has played ever since. In his first season, he scored nine goals for Chula.

After missing two easy chances in the game against Samut Songkhram he is known by Thai fans as "Thai Welbeck".

== International career ==
He won the gold medal with Thailand at the 2007 Southeast Asian Games. He also played in the 2009 Southeast Asian Games. He also took part in the 2007 Summer Universiade, hosted in Thailand and won bronze. In October 2011, Sompong scored in a match against Oman in the third round of 2014 FIFA World Cup qualification. He also played in two AFF Cups in 2012 and 2014.

== Career statistics ==
=== International ===
Appearances and goals by national team and year
National team	Year	Apps	Goals
Thailand	2010	2	0
Thailand	2011	6	1
Thailand	2012	6	1
Thailand	2014	4	0
Thailand	Total	18	2

Scores and results list Thailand's goal tally first, score column indicates score after each Soleb goal.

List of international goals scored by Sompong Soleb
No.	Date	Venue	Opponent	Score	Result	Competition
1	6 September 2011	Rajamangala Stadium, Bangkok, Thailand	Oman	1–0	3–0	2014 FIFA World Cup qualification
2	17 November 2012	Rajamangala Stadium, Bangkok, Thailand	Bangladesh	1–0	5–0	Friendly

== Honours ==
=== Club ===
Thai Port

- Thai FA Cup (1): 2009
- Thai League Cup (1): 2010

Buriram

- Thai Division 1 League (1): 2011

=== International ===
Thailand

- ASEAN Football Championship (1): 2014

Thailand U-23

- Sea Games Gold Medal (1); 2007
