= Nattawut Sombatyotha =

Thai professional footballer (born 1996)

Personal information
- Full name: Nattawut Sombatyotha
- Date of birth: 1 May 1996 (age 30)
- Place of birth: Kalasin, Thailand
- Height: 1.75 m (5 ft 9 in)
- Positions: Attacking midfielder; winger

Team information
- Current team: Navy
- Number: 10

Youth career
- 2008–2009: JMG Academy
- 2010: Bangkok Christian College
- 2011–2014: Suankularb Wittayalai School

Senior career*
Years	Team	Apps	(Gls)
2014–2015	Buriram United	13	(2)
2014	→ Surin City (loan)	15	(4)
2015	→ Navy (loan)	13	(0)
2016–2019	Ratchaburi Mitr Phol	83	(8)
2019	→ Chiangmai (loan)	12	(2)
2020–2024	Port	45	(6)
2023	→ Trat (loan)	14	(3)
2025	Mahasarakham SBT	11	(0)
2025	Kanchanaburi Power	0	(0)
2026	Burapha United	11	(3)
2026–	Navy	0	(0)

International career^{‡}
2011–2012	Thailand U16	7	(1)
2013–2014	Thailand U19	4	(0)
2016	Thailand U21	3	(1)
2016–2018	Thailand U23	12	(2)
Medal record
Thailand under-23
Sea Games
Gold medal – first place	Sea Games 2017	Football
- * Club domestic league appearances and goals as of 03:03, 11 January 2024 (UTC) ‡ National team caps and goals as of 13 January 2018

Nattawut Sombatyotha (Thai: ณัฐวุฒิ สมบัติโยธา) is a Thai professional footballer who plays as an attacking midfielder or a winger for Thai League 3 club Navy. He was born in Kalasin Province, in the northeast of Thailand, before relocating to Chonburi.

== Early life and career ==
As a child, Nattawut had a strong aversion to football until his older brother asked him to play football in order to lose weight. Gradually, he began to enjoy playing football as a sport and soon had the desire to improve. After outclassing his age group, Nattawut joined the JMG Academy and later attended the Bangkok Christian College, where he was called up to the Thailand Under-16's.

== Senior career ==
After winning the 2011 AFF U-16 Youth Championship with the Thailand Under-16's, he was handed a trial by Buriram United, who scouted him at the tournament. They signed him, and he was invited along with seven other Thai players to train for six months at Premier League club Leicester City's Academy. The experience affected him positively, since he claimed that it had "enriched him greatly". Afterwards, the forward was loaned to Thai third division side Surin City where he scored 5 goals in 14 outings.

== International career ==
He won the 2011 AFF U-16 Youth Championship with Thailand U16. In 2016 Nattawut was selected in Thailand U23 squad for 2016 AFC U-23 Championship in Qatar. In August 2017, he won the Football at the 2017 Southeast Asian Games with Thailand U23.

== Honours ==
=== Club ===
Buriram United

- Thai League T1: 2014
- Thai League Cup: 2014

=== International ===
Thailand U-23

- Sea Games Gold Medal: 2017
- Dubai Cup: 2017

Thailand U-21

- Nations Cup: 2016

Thailand U-16

- AFF U-16 Youth Championship: 2011
