= Satsanapong Wattayuchutikul =

Thai footballer (born 1992)

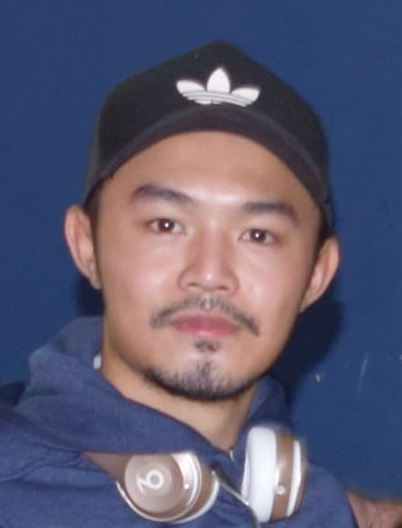

Personal information
- Full name: Satsanapong Wattayuchutikul
- Date of birth: 6 August 1992 (age 34)
- Place of birth: Khon Kaen, Thailand
- Height: 1.75 m (5 ft 9 in)
- Position: Left-back

Youth career
- 2005–2009: JMG Academy
- 2010: Muangthong United

Senior career*
Years	Team	Apps	(Gls)
2010–2015	Muangthong United	0	(0)
2011	→ Suphanburi (loan)	16	(0)
2012	→ Bangkok (loan)	26	(0)
2013	→ Nakhon Nayok (loan)	15	(0)
2014	→ TTM Customs (loan)	22	(0)
2015	→ Pattaya United (loan)	29	(4)
2016	Pattaya United	14	(0)
2017–2019	Ratchaburi Mitr Phol	45	(0)
2019	→ JL Chiangmai United (loan)	8	(0)
2020–2021	Sukhothai	23	(0)
2021–2023	Chiangmai United	47	(2)
2023–2024	Nakhon Pathom United	12	(0)
2024–2026	Kanchanaburi Power	48	(0)
- * Club domestic league appearances and goals as of 12 March 2025

Satsanapong Wattayuchutikul (Thai: ศาสนพงษ์ วัฒยุชูติกุล, born August 6, 1992) is a Thai pprofessional footballer who played as a defender.

== Personal life ==
Satsanapong is a Christian and is of Chinese descent.

== Honours ==
=== Club ===
Muangthong United

- Thai Premier League Champions (1) : 2010
