= Noppol Pol-udom =

Thai footballer (born 1985)

Personal information
- Full name: Noppol Pol-udom
- Date of birth: 22 January 1985 (age 41)
- Place of birth: Bangkok, Thailand
- Height: 1.80 m (5 ft 11 in)
- Positions: Attacking midfielder; striker

Youth career
- 2000–2005: Patumkongka School

Senior career*
Years	Team	Apps	(Gls)
2005–2010	Bangkok United	66	(19)
2010	Rajpracha	26	(5)
2011–2015	TOT	64	(7)
2015–2016	Super Power Samut Prakan	31	(4)
2016–2017	Ratchaburi Mitr Phol	17	(2)
2017	→ Thai Honda Ladkrabang (loan)	4	(0)
2018	Air Force Central	6	(0)
2018–2019	Samut Sakhon	21	(2)
2020–2021	Chiangrai City	1	(0)
- * Club domestic league appearances and goals

Noppol Pol-udom (Thai: นพพล ผลอุดม, born 22 January 1985), simply known as Tee (Thai: ตี๋), is a Thai professional footballer who plays as an attacking midfielder.

== Club career ==
He previously played for Bangkok University F.C. in the 2007 AFC Champions League group stage.

== Honours ==
=== Club ===
Bangkok University

- Thai League 1: 2006
