= Chutipol Thongthae =

Thai footballer (born 1991)

Personal information
- Full name: Chutipol Thongthae
- Date of birth: 23 January 1991 (age 35)
- Place of birth: Samut Prakan, Thailand
- Height: 1.74 m (5 ft 9 in)
- Position: Midfielder

Youth career
- 2004–2006: Watratburana School
- 2007–2009: Rajdamnern Commercial School
- 2009–2010: Buriram PEA

Senior career*
Years	Team	Apps	(Gls)
2010	Buriram PEA	2	(1)
2011	→ Buriram (loan)	19	(1)
2013	BBCU	13	(2)
2013–2019	Ratchaburi Mitr Phol	171	(11)
2019–2020	Suphanburi	18	(0)
2020–2021	PT Prachuap	23	(2)
2021–2023	Buriram United	11	(1)
2023	→ PT Prachuap (loan)	14	(1)
2023–2025	PT Prachuap	32	(5)
2025	Trat	12	(0)
2025–2026	Police Tero	13	(2)

International career
2013	Thailand U23	6	(2)
2017	Thailand	1	(0)
Medal record
Thailand under-23
Sea Games
Gold medal – first place	Sea Games 2013	Football
- * Club domestic league appearances and goals as of 18 May 2026

Chutipol Thongthae (Thai: ชุติพนธ์ ทองแท้, born January 23, 1991) is a Thai professional footballer who plays as a midfielder.

== International career ==
He represented Thailand U23 in the 2013 Southeast Asian Games.On 6 June 2017, he made the debut for Thailand in the friendly match against Uzbekistan.

== Honours ==
=== International ===
Thailand

- King's Cup (1): 2017

Thailand U-23

- Sea Games
  - Gold Medal (1); 2013

=== Clubs ===
Buriram United

- Thai League 1: 2021-22
- Thai FA Cup: 2021–22
- Thai League Cup: 2021–22
