= Pathomchai Sueasakul =

Thai footballer (born 1988)

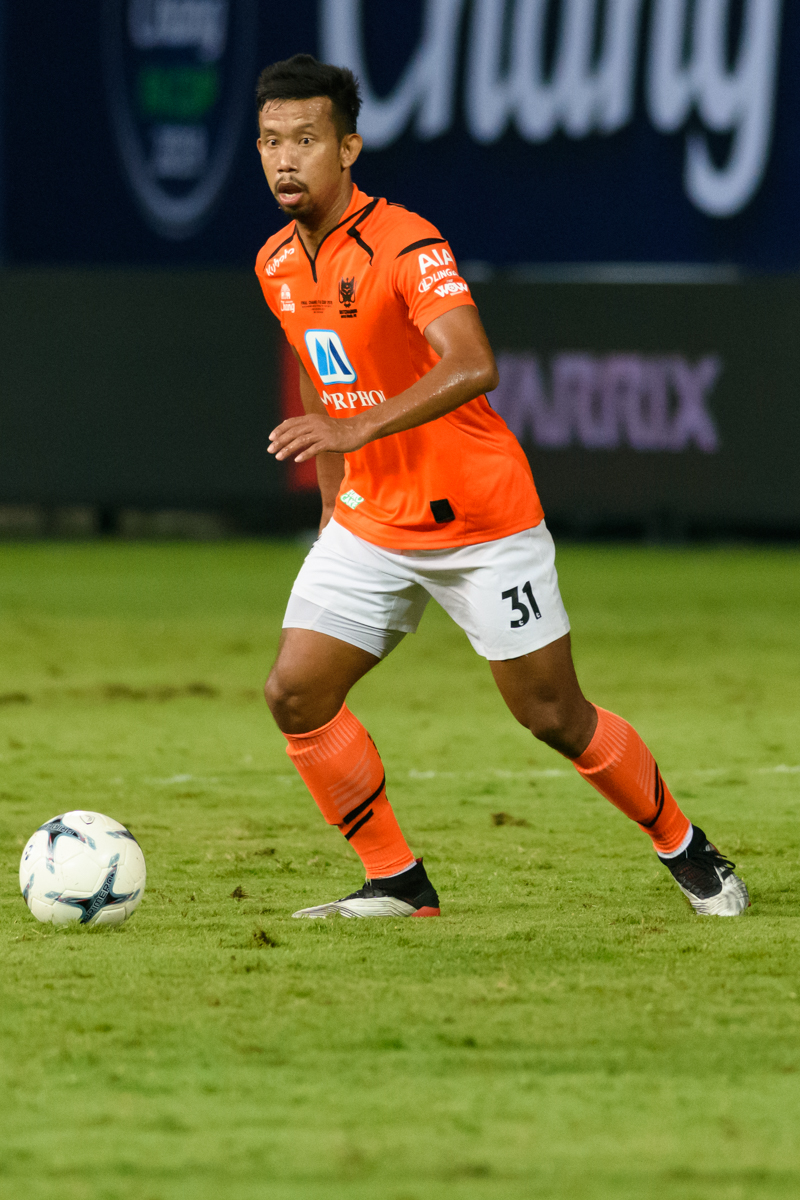

Personal information
- Full name: Pathomchai Sueasakul
- Date of birth: 10 October 1988 (age 38)
- Place of birth: Chainat, Thailand
- Height: 1.74 m (5 ft 8 1/2 in)
- Position: Defensive midfielder

Team information
- Current team: Chonburi (on loan from PT Prachuap)
- Number: 31

Senior career*
Years	Team	Apps	(Gls)
2010–2013	North Bangkok College	28	(5)
2014	Trat	31	(4)
2015	Saraburi	24	(3)
2016–2023	Ratchaburi Mitr Phol	188	(9)
2023–	PT Prachuap	22	(0)
2025–	→ Chonburi (loan)	8	(0)
- * Club domestic league appearances and goals as of 26 April 2025 (UTC)

Pathomchai Sueasakul (Thai: ปฐมชัย เสือสกุล, born October 10, 1988) is a Thai professional footballer who plays as a defensive midfielder for Thai League 2 club Chonburi, on loan from PT Prachuap.

== Honours ==
=== Club ===
Chonburi

- Thai League 2 : 2024–25
