= Thailand national under-21 football team =

Thailand Under-21
- Nickname(s): ช้างศึก (The War Elephants)
- Association: Football Association of Thailand
- Confederation: AFC (Asia)
- Sub-confederation: AFF (Southeast Asia)
- Home stadium: Rajamangala Stadium
- FIFA code: THA
First colours	Second colours	Third colours

The Thailand national under-21 football team (Thai: ฟุตบอลทีมชาติไทยรุ่นอายุไม่เกิน 21 ปี, RTGS: futbon thim chat thai run ayu mai koen yi sip et pi), also known as the Thailand Pre-Olympic football team, is the national team for under 21 level represents Thailand in international under-21 football competitions. The squad is the feeder team for senior national football team and under 23 national football team. The team is managed by the Football Association of Thailand.

== Schedule and results ==
Win Draw Lose

== Head coaches ==
Thailand national under-21 football team head coaches
Name	Country	Period	Honour
Worrawoot Srimaka	Thailand	2016	2016 Nations Cup – Winners
Julián Marín Bazalo	Spain	2017–2018	
Worrawoot Srimaka	Thailand	2018	
Alexandre Gama	Brazil	2018	2018 CFA Under-21 Football Tournament – 4th place

== Competitive record ==
=== Exhibition game ===
Exhibition game record
Year	Tournament	Result	Position	GP	W	D*	L	GS	GA
2016	(Malaysia) Nations Cup	Champions	1st	2	2	0	0	4	1
2016	(Vietnam) 2016 International U-21 Thanh Niên Newspaper Cup	Runner-up	2nd	4	3	0	1	10	4
Total				6	5	0	1	14	5

Note

- * : Denotes draws including knockout matches decided on penalty kicks.

== Honours ==
This is a list of honours for the Thailand national under-21 football team.

=== Minor titles ===
- Nations Cup

- Winners (1): 2016

- Thanh Niên Cup

- Runner-up (1): 2016 International U-21 Thanh Niên Newspaper Cup

== See also ==
- Thailand national football team
- Thailand national under-23 football team
- Thailand national under-20 football team
- Thailand national under-17 football team
- Football in Thailand
