= 2021–22 Chiangrai United F.C. season =

Association football season

Chiangrai United
2021–22 season
- Chairman: Pawitsarat Tiyapairat
- Manager: Emerson Pereira
- Stadium: Leo Chiangrai Stadium
- Thai League 1: 5th
- FA Cup: Third round
- League Cup: Semi-finals
- Champions Cup: Runners-up
- 2021 ACL: Group stage
- 2022 ACL: Group stage
- Top goalscorer: League: Bill (8); All: Bill (11)

The 2021–22 season is Chiangrai United's 11th consecutive season in Thai League 1, following promotion in 2010.

In addition to the domestic league, the club will also compete in this season's editions of the Thai FA Cup and the AFC Champions League.

== Squad ==
As of 6 December 2021.

Squad No.	Name	Nationality	Date of birth (age)	Previous club
Goalkeepers
1	Saranon Anuin	(Thailand)	24 March 1994 (age 32)	(Thailand) Nakhon Ratchasima
22	Apirak Worawong	(Thailand)	7 January 1996 (age 30)	(Thailand) Army United
39	Farus Patee	(Thailand)	6 November 1996 (age 29)	(Thailand) Ratchaburi Mitr Phol B
Defenders
2	Wasan Homsan	(Thailand)	2 August 1991 (age 34)	(Thailand) Suphanburi
3	Tanasak Srisai	(Thailand)	22 September 1989 (age 36)	(Thailand) Police Tero
5	Brinner	(Brazil)	16 July 1987 (age 39)	(Thailand) Ubon UMT United
15	Nattawut Jaroenboot	(Thailand)	27 April 1991 (age 35)	(Thailand) Sukhothai
30	Suriya Singmui	(Thailand)	7 April 1995 (age 31)	(Thailand) BEC Tero Sasana
33	Sarawut Inpaen	(Thailand)	3 March 1992 (age 34)	(Thailand) Trat
36	Shinnaphat Leeaoh	(Thailand)	2 February 1997 (age 29)	(Thailand) Pattaya United
44	Tora Charoensuk	(Thailand)	5 January 1994 (age 32)	NA
45	Sarawut Yodyinghathaikul	(Thailand)	6 March 1999 (age 27)	(Thailand) Chiangrai City
	Nitipong Selanon	(Thailand)	25 May 1993 (age 33)	(Thailand) Port
Midfielders
4	Kohei Kato	(Japan)	14 June 1989 (age 37)	(Portugal) Anadia
6	Phitiwat Sukjitthammakul	(Thailand)	1 February 1995 (age 31)	(Thailand) BEC Tero Sasana
10	Sivakorn Tiatrakul	(Thailand)	7 July 1994 (age 32)	(Thailand) BEC Tero Sasana
13	Chotipat Poomkaew	(Thailand)	28 May 1998 (age 28)	(Thailand) Chiangmai
14	Sanukran Thinjom	(Thailand)	12 September 1993 (age 32)	(Thailand) Muangthong United
27	Gionata Verzura	(Thailand)	27 May 1992 (age 34)	(Thailand) Chiangmai
40	Krisnatee Kaewrakmuk	(Thailand)	9 January 2003 (age 23)	Youth Team
46	Pharadon Pattanapol	(Thailand)	23 September 2001 (age 24)	Youth Team
49	Varintorn Watcharapringam	(Thailand)	18 January 2003 (age 23)	Youth Team
Strikers
7	Felipe Amorim	(Brazil)	4 January 1991 (age 35)	(Thailand) Suphanburi
8	Getterson	(Brazil)	16 May 1991 (age 35)	(Saudi Arabia) Al-Ain
16	Akarawin Sawasdee	(Thailand)	26 September 1990 (age 35)	(Thailand) BBCU
35	Siroch Chatthong	(Thailand)	8 December 1992 (age 33)	(Thailand) BG Pathum United
Players loaned out / left during season
8	Cho Ji-hun	(South Korea)	29 May 1990 (age 36)	(South Korea) Gangwon
9	Bill	(Brazil)	2 July 1984 (age 42)	(Thailand) Ratchaburi Mitr Phol
17	Somkid Chamnarnsilp	(Thailand)	7 January 1993 (age 33)	(Thailand) Chiangmai
37	Ekanit Panya	(Thailand)	21 October 1999 (age 26)	(Thailand) Chiangmai

== Transfer ==
=== Pre-season transfer ===
==== In ====
Position	Player	Transferred from	Ref
MF	(Thailand) Nattawut Jaroenboot	(Thailand) Sukhothai	Loan
MF	(Thailand) Tatchanon Nakarawong	(Thailand) Nakhon Ratchasima	Loan Return

==== Out ====
Position	Player	Transferred To	Ref
MF	(Thailand) Chaiyawat Buran	(Thailand) Samut Prakan City	THB2m
MF	(Thailand) Tatchanon Nakarawong	(Thailand) Muangkan United	Free

==== Loan Out ====
Position	Player	Transferred To	Ref
GK	(Thailand) Thirayu Banhan	(Thailand) PT Prachuap	Loan
MF	(Thailand) Nont Muangngam	(Thailand) Chiangmai United	Loan

=== Mid-season transfer ===
==== In ====
Position	Player	Transferred from	Ref
DF	(Thailand) Nitipong Selanon	(Thailand) Port	Free
MF	(Japan) Kohei Kato	(Portugal) Anadia	Undisclosed
FW	(Thailand) Siroch Chatthong	(Thailand) BG Pathum United	Loan
FW	(Brazil) Getterson	(Saudi Arabia) Al-Ain	Undisclosed

==== Out ====
Position	Player	Transferred To	Ref
MF	(South Korea) Cho Ji-hun	(South Korea) FC Seoul	Free

==== Loan Out ====
Position	Player	Transferred To	Ref
MF	(Thailand) Ekanit Panya	(Thailand) Chiangmai United	Loan
FW	(Brazil) Bill	(Thailand) Chiangmai United	Loan
FW	(Thailand) Somkid Chamnarnsilp	(Thailand) Sukhothai	Loan

==== Return from loan ====
Position	Player	Transferred from	Ref

==== Extension ====
Position	Player	Ref

== Friendlies ==
=== Pre-Season Friendly ===
Win Draw Loss

=== Mid-Season Friendly ===
Win Draw Loss

== Competitions ==
=== Overview ===
Competition	First match	Last match	Starting round	Final position	Record							
Competition	First match	Last match	Starting round	Final position	Pld	W	D	L	GF	GA	GD	Win %
Thai League 1	5 September 2021	4 May 2022	Matchday 1	Matchday 30	30	13	8	9	33	35	−2	43.33
FA Cup	27 October 2021	19 January 2022	First round	Third round	3	2	0	1	17	4	+13	66.67
League Cup	12 January 2022	25 May 2022	First round	Semi-finals	4	3	0	1	9	4	+5	75.00
Champions Cup	1 September 2021		Final	Runners-up	1	0	0	1	0	1	−1	0.00
2021 ACL	25 June 2021	10 July 2021	Group stage	Group stage	6	2	2	2	8	7	+1	33.33
2022 ACL	16 April 2022	28 April 2022	Group stage	Group stage	4	0	1	3	2	10	−8	0.00
Total					48	20	11	17	69	61	+8	41.67

Last updated: 25 May 2022
Source: Competitions

=== Champions Cup ===
1 September 2021 Final	BG Pathum United	1–0	Leo Chiangrai United	Mae Rim, Chiang Mai
18:00 UTC+7	Ryo 87'; Ernesto (yellow card) 31'; Irfan (yellow card) 57'; Chaowat (yellow card) 86'; Pathompol (yellow card) 90+1'; Diogo (yellow card) 90+4'		Suriya (yellow card) 16'; Bill (yellow card) 45+4'; Brinner (red card) 18'	Stadium: 700th Anniversary of Chiang Mai Stadium; Attendance: 0 Referee: Wiwat Jampa-on

=== Thai League 1 ===
==== League table ====
Pos	Team	Pld	W	D	L	GF	GA	GD	Pts
3	Bangkok United	30	15	8	7	53	30	+23	53
4	Muangthong United	30	13	10	7	46	35	+11	49
5	Chiangrai United	30	13	8	9	33	35	−2	47
6	Nongbua Pitchaya	30	13	8	9	42	35	+7	47
7	Chonburi	30	12	8	10	50	40	+10	44

Updated to match(es) played on 4 May 2022. Source: Thai League
Rules for classification: 1) Points; 2) Head-to-head points; 3) Head-to-head goals difference; 4) Head-to-head goals scored; 5) Overall goals difference; 6) Overall goals scored; 7) Fair play points; 8) Play-off without extra time;).

==== Results summary ====
Overall								Home						Away					
Pld	W	D	L	GF	GA	GD	Pts	W	D	L	GF	GA	GD	W	D	L	GF	GA	GD
30	13	8	9	33	35	−2	47	4	5	6	13	21	−8	9	3	3	20	14	+6

==== Results by matchday ====
Matchday	1	2	3	4	5	6	7	8	9	10	11	12	13	14	15	16	17	18	19	20	21	22	23	24	25	26	27	28	29	30
Ground	H	H	H	H	A	A	A	H	H	A	H	A	H	A	H	A	A	A	H	H	H	A	A	H	A	H	A	H	A	A
Result	D	W	D	L	W	W	W	L	W	L	L	W	L	W	L	L	W	W	W	L	W	D	W	D	L	D	D	D	D	W
Position	6	3	5	9	4	3	2	3	3	4	6	5	8	6	7	7	7	7	6	6	6	4	4	4	4	4	4	6	7	5

Updated to match(es) played on 4 May 2022. Source:
A = Away; H = Home; W = Win; D = Draw; L = Loss

==== Matches ====
Win Draw Loss

5 September 2021 1	Leo Chiangrai United	2–2	Samut Prakan City	Chiang Rai
18:00 UTC+7	Sivakorn 69'; Bill 82'		Chaiyawat 74'; Chayawat 79'	Stadium: Leo Chiangrai Stadium; Attendance: 262; Referee: Natee Chusuwan; Man of the Match: Suphanan Bureerat (Samut Prakan City)

11 September 2021 2	Leo Chiangrai United	3–2	Nakhon Ratchasima Mazda	Chiang Rai
18:00 UTC+7	Bill 45+2' (pen.), 90+9' (pen.); Sivakorn 71'; Somkid (yellow card) 78'		Abdulhafiz 12'; Sahanek 45+3'; Villanueva (yellow card) 14'; Pralong (yellow card) 83'; Thiti (yellow card) 90+8'	Stadium: Leo Chiangrai Stadium; Attendance: 388; Referee: Noppadech Mangngam; Man of the Match: Tanachai Noorach (Nakhon Ratchasima)

18 September 2021 3	Leo Chiangrai United	0–0	Ratchaburi Mitr Phol	Chiang Rai
18:00 UTC+7	Tanasak (yellow card) 36'		Sittichok (yellow card) 90+4'; Woodland (red card) 21'	Stadium: Leo Chiangrai Stadium; Attendance: 429; Referee: Paisan Bendem-alee; Man of the Match: Kampol Pathomakkakul (Ratchaburi Mitr Phol)

25 September 2021 4	Leo Chiangrai United	1–2	PT Prachuap	Chiang Rai
18:00 UTC+7	Felipe 52'; Tanasak (yellow card) 80'		Apichart 78', 90+1'; Prasit (yellow card) 29'; Willen (yellow card) 90+1'; Ratchapol (yellow card) 90+5'	Stadium: Leo Chiangrai Stadium; Attendance: 358; Referee: Warintorn Sassadee; Man of the Match: Jirunpong Thammasiha (PT Prachuap)

1 October 2021 5	Chonburi	2–3	Leo Chiangrai United	Chonburi
18:00 UTC+7	Kritsada 42'; Kroekrit 45+2'; Eldstål (red card) 66'		Bill 1', 64' (pen.), 87', (yellow card) 87'; Sivakorn (yellow card) 55'; Phitiwat (yellow card) 81'	Stadium: Chonburi Stadium; Attendance: 1,425; Referee: Chaireag Ngam-som; Man of the Match: Felipe Amorim (Chiangrai United)

6 October 2021 6	BG Pathum United	0–2	Leo Chiangrai United	Pathum Thani
18:00 UTC+7	Sarawut (yellow card) 42'		Felipe 28'; Phitiwat 45+2'; Gionata (yellow card) 43'; Nattawut (yellow card) 87'	Stadium: BG Stadium; Attendance: 0 Referee: Niwat Insa-ard; Man of the Match: Sivakorn Tiatrakul (Chiangrai United)

9 October 2021 7	Nongbua Pitchaya	1–2	Leo Chiangrai United	Nong Bua Lamphu
18:00 UTC+7	Hamilton 49'; Lursan (yellow card) 90+3'		Felipe 1'; Chotipat 63'; Ekanit (yellow card) 20'; Apirak (yellow card) 86'	Stadium: Pitchaya Stadium; Attendance: 849; Referee: Warintorn Sassadee; Man of the Match: Chotipat Poomkaew (Chiangrai United)

16 October 2021 8	Leo Chiangrai United	0–1	Muangthong United	Chiang Rai
18:30 UTC+7	Wasan (yellow card) 61'; Pharadon (yellow card) 90'		Popp 90+3', (yellow card) 70'; Chatchai (yellow card) 45'; Ballini (red card) 16'	Stadium: Leo Chiangrai Stadium; Attendance: 1,038; Referee: Torpong Somsing; Man of the Match: Peerapong Ruennin (Muangthong United)

23 October 2021 9	Leo Chiangrai United	1–0	Khonkaen United	Chiang Rai
19:00 UTC+7	Bill 19' (pen.), (yellow card) 79'; Suriya (yellow card) 64'; Apirak (yellow card) 90+5'		Islame (yellow card) 62'; Apisorn (yellow card) 90'	Stadium: Leo Chiangrai Stadium; Attendance: 526; Referee: Titichai Nuanchan; Man of the Match: Apirak Worawong (Chiangrai United)

30 October 2021 10	Police Tero	3–2	Leo Chiangrai United	Lak Si, Bangkok
19:00 UTC+7	Teeretep 18', 71', (yellow card) 90+2'; Janepop 63'; Kanokpon (yellow card) 54'; Prasit (yellow card) 80'		Akarawin 52'; Bill 88'; Felipe (yellow card) 45+3'; Brinner (yellow card) 90+2'	Stadium: Boonyachinda Stadium; Attendance: 1,112; Referee: Warintorn Sassadee; Man of the Match: Teeratep Winothai (Police Tero)

6 November 2021 11	Leo Chiangrai United	0–4	True Bangkok United	Chiang Rai
18:00 UTC+7	Felipe (yellow card) 37'; Tanasak (red card) 69'		Heberty 31', 70'; Vander 55'; Tristan 90+3'; Rungrath (yellow card) 89'	Stadium: Leo Chiangrai Stadium; Attendance: 702; Referee: Sivakorn Pu-udom; Man of the Match: Heberty Fernandes (Bangkok United)

10 November 2021 12	Suphanburi	0–1	Leo Chiangrai United	Suphan Buri
18:30 UTC+7			Brinner 84'; Felipe (red card) 50'	Stadium: Suphan Buri Provincial Stadium; Attendance: 653; Referee: Paisan Bendem-alee; Man of the Match: Brinner Henrique (Chiangrai United)

14 November 2021 13	Leo Chiangrai United	0–4	Port	Chiang Rai
19:00 UTC+7	Wasan (yellow card) 19'; Suriya (yellow card) 61'; Shinnaphat (yellow card) 69'; Sarawut (yellow card) 90+3'		Suárez 8', 45+1', 65' (yellow card) 60'; Bonilla 63'	Stadium: Leo Chiangrai Stadium; Attendance: 1,020; Referee: Natee Choosuwan; Man of the Match: Sergio Suárez (Port)

21 November 2021 14	Chiangmai United	0–1	Leo Chiangrai United	Mae Rim, Chiang Mai
18:00 UTC+7	De Leeuw (yellow card) 31' (yellow-red card) 90+6'; Saharat (yellow card) 53'		Sarawut 45+3'; Felipe (yellow card) 49'	Stadium: 700th Anniversary Stadium; Attendance: 1,259; Referee: Sarayut Chakngern; Man of the Match: Sivakorn Tiatrakul (Chiangrai United)

28 November 2021 15	Leo Chiangrai United	0–1	Buriram United	Chiang Rai
19:00 UTC+7	Suriya (yellow card) 37'; Phitiwat (yellow card) 73'; Pharadon (yellow card) 89'		Supachai 51'; Sulaka (yellow card) 26'	Stadium: Leo Chiangrai Stadium; Attendance: 2,411; Referee: Sivakorn Pu-udom; Man of the Match: Supachai Chaided (Buriram United)

26 January 2022 16 (Rescheduled)	Nakhon Ratchasima Mazda	1–0	Leo Chiangrai United	Nakhon Ratchasima
18:00 UTC+7	Karikari 85'; Villanueva (yellow card) 33'		Sarawut (yellow card) 31'; Sanukran (yellow card) 90+3'	Stadium: 80th Birthday Stadium; Attendance: 2,085; Referee: Niwat Insa-ard; Man of the Match: Kwame Karikari (Nakhon Ratchasima)

15 January 2022 17	Ratchaburi Mitr Phol	0–1	Leo Chiangrai United	Ratchaburi
17:30 UTC+7	Ayed (yellow card) 79'		Jansen 56' (o.g.); Kato (yellow card) 90'	Stadium: Mitr Phol Stadium; Attendance: 1,986; Referee: Torpong Somsing; Man of the Match: Kohei Kato (Chiangrai United)

22 January 2022 18	PT Prachuap	1–3	Leo Chiangrai United	Prachuap Khiri Khan
18:00 UTC+7	Apichart 68'; Thitawee (yellow card) 7'; Praweenwat (yellow card) 83'		Getterson 3'; Akarawin 86', 90+6' (pen.); Nitipong (yellow card) 19'; Kato (yellow card) 45+1'; Sarawut (yellow card) 46'	Stadium: Sam Ao Stadium; Attendance: 481; Referee: Natee Chusuwan; Man of the Match: Akarawin Sawasdee (Chiangrai United)

6 February 2022 19	Leo Chiangrai United	1–0	Chonburi	Chiang Rai
18:00 UTC+7	Shinnaphat 59'; Apirak (yellow card) 90+4'		Saharat (yellow card) 40'; Faiq (yellow card) 87'; Rangsan (yellow card) 90+1'	Stadium: Leo Chiangrai Stadium; Attendance: 1,462; Referee: Sahapob Sriboonlue; Man of the Match: Shinnaphat Leeaoh (Chiangrai United)

12 February 2022 20	Leo Chiangrai United	1–2	BG Pathum United	Chiang Rai
19:00 UTC+7	Kato 54'; Sarawut (yellow card) 57'; Brinner (yellow card) 74'		Brinner 12' (o.g.); Diogo 88' (pen.); Pathompol (yellow card) 14'; Ernesto (yellow card) 45+1'; Ikhsan (yellow card) 45+3'	Stadium: Leo Chiangrai Stadium; Attendance: 2,284; Referee: Niwat Insa-ard; Man of the Match: Prasit Padungchok (BG Pathum United)

20 February 2022 21	Leo Chiangrai United	2–1	Nongbua Pitchaya	Chiang Rai
19:00 UTC+7	Aguinaldo 39' (o.g.); Felipe 90+1'; Sarawut (yellow card) 29'; Shinnaphat (yellow card) 32'; Sivakorn (yellow card) 42'; Tanasak (yellow card) 48'; Phitiwat (yellow card) 66'		Jiraphan 45+2'; Mahmoud (yellow card) 89'; Yod (yellow card) 90+3'	Stadium: Leo Chiangrai Stadium; Attendance: 1,200; Referee: Natee Chusuwan; Man of the Match: Felipe Amorim (Chiangrai United)

27 February 2022 22	Muangthong United	1–1	Leo Chiangrai United	Pak Kret, Nonthaburi
19:00 UTC+7	Anier 64'; Weerathep (yellow card) 79'		Getterson 84'; Wasan (yellow card) 89'	Stadium: Thunderdome Stadium; Attendance: 3,328; Referee: Sivakorn Pu-udom; Man of the Match: Getterson Alves (Chiangrai United)

5 March 2022 23	Khonkaen United	0–1	Leo Chiangrai United	Khon Kaen
18:00 UTC+7	Narongrit (yellow card) 38'; Grommen (yellow card) 45+1'; Kitphom (yellow card) 64'; Islame (yellow card) 71'; Parndecha (yellow card) 78'		Felipe 39'; Gionata (yellow card) 25'; Akarawin (yellow card) 36'; Brinner (yellow card) 59'; Sanukran (yellow card) 61'	Stadium: Khon Kaen PAO. Stadium; Attendance: 4,495; Referee: Noppadech Muangngam; Man of the Match: Felipe Amorim (Chiangrai United)

29 January 2022 24 (Rescheduled)	Leo Chiangrai United	0–0	Police Tero	Chiang Rai
18:00 UTC+7	Kato (yellow card) 29'; Sarawut (yellow card) 45+1'		Wanchai (yellow card) 31'; Teeratep (yellow card) 54'; Ryo (yellow card) 90'	Stadium: Leo Chiangrai Stadium; Attendance: 1,309; Referee: Akom Jaroensuk; Man of the Match: Sinthaweechai Hathairattanakool (Police Tero)

19 March 2022 25	True Bangkok United	3–0	Leo Chiangrai United	Pathum Thani
18:30 UTC+7	Everton 21'; Chananan 75', 78'; Wisarut (yellow card) 45+1'		Tanasak (yellow card) 12'; Felipe (yellow card) 58'; Wasan (yellow card) 59'	Stadium: Thammasat Stadium; Attendance: 1,921; Referee: Warintorn Sassadee; Man of the Match: Everton Saturnino (Bangkok United)

10 April 2022 26	Leo Chiangrai United	2–2	Suphanburi	Chiang Rai
18:00 UTC+7	Akarawin 38'; Jung Han-cheol 48' (o.g.)		Jung Han-cheol 26', (yellow card) 85'; William Henrique 59'; Danilo (yellow card) 39'; Patcharapol (yellow card) 90'	Stadium: Leo Chiangrai Stadium; Referee: Anusorn Nookaew; Man of the Match: Sahawit Khumpiam (Suphanburi)

9 March 2022 27 (Rescheduled)	Port	0–0	Leo Chiangrai United	Khlong Toei, Bangkok
19:30 UTC+7	Bonilla (yellow card) 54'			Stadium: PAT Stadium; Attendance: 1,629; Referee: Vitsavet Sangnakorn; Man of the Match: Gionata Verzura (Chiangrai United)

2 April 2022 28 (Rescheduled)	Leo Chiangrai United	0–0	Chiangmai United	Chiang Rai
18:30 UTC+7			Baworn (yellow card) 30'	Stadium: Leo Chiangrai Stadium; Attendance: 631; Referee: Niwat Insa-ard; Man of the Match: Pairot Eiammak (Chiangmai United)

6 April 2022 29 (Rescheduled)	Buriram United	1–1	Leo Chiangrai United	Buriram
18:30 UTC+7	Supachok 53' (pen.); Ratthanakorn (yellow card) 84'		Getterson 86', (yellow card) 62'; Tanasak (yellow card) 44' (yellow-red card) 51'; Wasan (yellow card) 90'; Sivakorn (yellow card) 90+5'	Stadium: Chang Arena; Attendance: 23,046; Referee: Sarayut Chakngern; Man of the Match: Phitiwat Sukjitthammakul (Chiangrai United)

4 May 2022 30	Samut Prakan City	1–2	Leo Chiangrai United	Bang Phli, Samut Prakan
18:00 UTC+7	Chayawat 90+4'; Zarifović (yellow card) 84'		Getterson 20', (yellow card) 77'; Akarawin 90+2'; Sanukran (yellow card) 22'; Suriya (yellow card) 52'	Stadium: Samut Prakan SAT Stadium; Attendance: 1,961; Referee: Mongkolchai Pechsri; Man of the Match: Saranon Anuin (Chiangrai United)

=== Thai FA Cup ===
==== Matches ====
Win Draw Loss

27 October 2021 First round	Leo Chiangrai United (T1)	12–0	Nan City (TA)	Chiang Rai
17:30 UTC+7	Akarawin 2', 10', 36'; Nattawut 39'; Sanukran 43', 54'; Chotipat 79', 89'; Sivakorn 81', 87'; Sarawut 83'; Cho Ji-hun 90+1'			Stadium: Leo Chiangrai Stadium; Attendance: 0 Referee: Chaireag Ngam-som; Man of the Match: Akarawin Sawasdee (Chiangrai United)

24 November 2021 Second round	Ratchaburi Mitr Phol (T1)	0–4	Leo Chiangrai United (T1)	Ratchaburi
19:00 UTC+7	Thanaset (yellow card) 45+2'; Pawee (yellow card) 58'; Langil (yellow card) 90+2'		Phitiwat 1'; Felipe 44', 61'; Akarawin 52', (yellow card) 43'; Cho Ji-hun (yellow card) 31'	Stadium: Mitr Phol Stadium; Attendance: 705; Referee: Mongkolchai Pechsri; Man of the Match: Felipe Amorim (Chiangrai United)

19 January 2022 Third round	Buriram United (T1)	4–1	Leo Chiangrai United (T1)	Buriram
17:00 UTC+7	Bolingi 14' (pen.); Sulaka 28', (yellow card) 84'; Maicon 81' (pen.), 90+3'; Peeradon (yellow card) 45+2'; Ratthanakorn (yellow card) 64'; Masika (yellow card) 73'; Narubadin (yellow card) 83'		Chotipat 60'; Wasan (yellow card) 61'; Kato (yellow card) 71'	Stadium: Chang Arena; Attendance: 5,070; Referee: Chaireag Ngam-som; Man of the Match: Maicon Marques (Buriram United)

=== League Cup ===
==== Matches ====
Win Draw Loss

12 January 2022 First round	Phitsanulok (T3)	1–2	Leo Chiangrai United (T1)	Phitsanulok
15:00 UTC+7	Naphat 15'; Watsapon (yellow card) 55'; Natthawut (yellow card) 73'		Sivakorn 27'; Getterson 90+4'; Phitiwat (yellow card) 45+3'	Stadium: Phitsanulok PAO. Stadium; Attendance: 327; Referee: Tastarawut Khantavichai; Man of the Match: Phitiwat Sukjitthammakul (Chiangrai United)

9 February 2022 Second round	Leo Chiangrai United (T1)	3–0	Chiangmai United (T1)	Chiang Rai
19:00 UTC+7	Chotipat 32'; Siroch 45'; Felipe 79'; Sivakorn (yellow card) 35'		Baworn (yellow card) 23'; Todsapol (yellow card) 83'	Stadium: Leo Chiangrai Stadium; Attendance: 537; Referee: Sarayut Chakngern; Man of the Match: Siroch Chatthong (Chiangrai United)

12 March 2022 Quarter-finals	Leo Chiangrai United (T1)	4–2	BG Pathum United (T1)	Chiang Rai
19:00 UTC+7	Felipe 19'; Getterson 51', 55'; Túñez 72' (o.g.); Phitiwat (yellow card) 53'		Ikhsan 34', 69'; Túñez (yellow card) 30'; Nakin (yellow card) 79'	Stadium: Leo Chiangrai Stadium; Attendance: 1,752; Referee: Songkran Boonmeekiat; Man of the Match: Getterson Alves (Chiangrai United)

25 May 2022 Semi-finals	Buriram United (T1)	1–0	Leo Chiangrai United (T1)	Chonburi
19:00 UTC+7	Theerathon 9'; Masika (yellow card) 56'; Sasalak (yellow card) 90+1'		Sanukran (yellow card) 8'; Phitiwat (yellow card) 41'; Kato (yellow card) 57'; Sivakorn (yellow card) 61'	Stadium: Chonburi Stadium; Attendance: 2,826; Referee: Natee Choosuwan; Man of the Match: Theerathon Bunmathan (Buriram United)

=== 2021 AFC Champions League ===
==== Group stage ====
Pos	Team	Pld	W	D	L	GF	GA	GD	Pts	Qualification	JEO	GAM	CHI	TAM
1	(South Korea) Jeonbuk Hyundai Motors	6	5	1	0	22	5	+17	16	Advance to Round of 16	—	2–1	2–1	9–0
2	(Japan) Gamba Osaka	6	2	3	1	15	7	+8	9		2–2	—	1–1	8–1
3	(Thailand) Chiangrai United	6	2	2	2	8	7	+1	8		1–3	1–1	—	1–0
4	(Singapore) Tampines Rovers	6	0	0	6	1	27	−26	0		0–4	0–2	0–3	—

Source: AFC
Rules for classification: Tiebreakers

Win Draw Loss

25 June 2021 Matchday 1	Jeonbuk Hyundai Motors (South Korea)	2–1	(Thailand) Chiangrai United	Tashkent, Uzbekistan
21:00 UTC+5	Lee Seung-gi 36'; Gustavo 52'; Choi Young-jun (yellow card) 20'	Report	Ekanit 68'; Bill (yellow card) 33'; Brinner (yellow card) 54'	Stadium: Bunyodkor Stadium; Attendance: 0 Referee: Abdulrahman Al-Jassim (Qatar); Man of the Match: (South Korea) Lee Seung-gi

28 June 2021 Matchday 2	Chiangrai United (Thailand)	1–0	(Singapore) Tampines Rovers	Tashkent, Uzbekistan
19:00 UTC+5	Sivakorn 87'; Phitiwat (yellow card) 31'	Report	Kopitović (yellow card) 35'; Yasir (yellow card) 80'	Stadium: Bunyodkor Stadium; Attendance: 0 Referee: Omar Mohamed Al-Ali (United Arab Emirates); Man of the Match: (Thailand) Sivakorn Tiatrakul

1 July 2021 Matchday 3	Chiangrai United (Thailand)	1–1	(Japan) Gamba Osaka	Tashkent, Uzbekistan
21:00 UTC+5	Bill 90+4'; Ekanit (yellow card) 19'; Shinnaphat (yellow card) 21'; Wasan (yellow card) 48'; Somkid (yellow card) 19'	Live Report; Stats Report	Pereira 47'; Yamamoto (yellow card) 39'; Suganuma (yellow card) 58'	Stadium: Bunyodkor Stadium; Attendance: 0 Referee: Ahmed Al-Kaf (Oman); Man of the Match: (Brazil) Leandro Pereira

4 July 2021 Matchday 4	Gamba Osaka (Japan)	1–1	(Thailand) Chiangrai United	Tashkent, Uzbekistan
21:00 UTC+5	Brinner 54' (o.g.); Ideguchi (yellow card) 50'; Suganuma (yellow card) 78'; Ichimi (yellow card) 90+2'	Report	Felipe 6'; Apirak (yellow card) 80'; Sarawut (yellow card) 88'	Stadium: Lokomotiv Stadium; Attendance: 0 Referee: Mohd Amirul Izwan Yaacob (Malaysia); Man of the Match: (Thailand) Sivakorn Tiatrakul

7 July 2021 Matchday 5	Chiangrai United (Thailand)	1–3	(South Korea) Jeonbuk Hyundai Motors	Tashkent, Uzbekistan
21:00 UTC+5	Bill 68' (pen.); Sarawut (yellow card) 34'; Gionata (yellow card) 69'	Live Report; Stats Report	Modou Barrow 9'; Apirak 20' (o.g.); Park Jin-seong 34'; Lee Yong (yellow card) 45'; Lee Sung-yoon (yellow card) 90+3'	Stadium: Lokomotiv Stadium; Attendance: 0 Referee: Mooud Bonyadifar (Iran); Man of the Match: (South Korea) Hong Jeong-Ho

10 July 2021 Matchday 6	Tampines Rovers (Singapore)	0–3	(Thailand) Chiangrai United	Tashkent, Uzbekistan
19:00 UTC+5	Kopitović (yellow card) 45+2'; Mehmedović (yellow card) 77'	Report	Felipe 75'; Bill 82'; Phitiwat 90'	Stadium: Lokomotiv Stadium; Attendance: 0 Referee: Mohd Amirul Izwan Yaacob (Malaysia); Man of the Match: (Brazil) Bill

=== 2022 AFC Champions League ===
==== Group stage ====
Pos	Team	Pld	W	D	L	GF	GA	GD	Pts	Qualification	VKO	KIT	CRU	SHP
1	(Japan) Vissel Kobe	4	2	2	0	10	3	+7	8	Advance to Round of 16	—	2–1	6–0	Canc.
2	(Hong Kong) Kitchee	4	2	1	1	7	6	+1	7	Advance to Round of 16	2–2	—	1–0	Canc.
3	(Thailand) Chiangrai United (H)	4	0	1	3	2	10	−8	1		0–0	2–3	—	Canc.
4	(China) Shanghai Port	0	0	0	0	0	0	0	0	Withdrew	Canc.	Canc.	Canc.	—

Source: AFC
Rules for classification: Tiebreakers
(H) Hosts

Win Draw Loss

16 April 2022 Matchday 1	Kitchee (Hong Kong)	1–0	(Thailand) Chiangrai United	Buriram, Thailand
18:00 UTC+7	Mingazow 17', (yellow card) 52'; Paulo (yellow card) 38'; Hélio (yellow card) 61'	Report	Phitiwat (yellow card) 23'; Suriya (yellow card) 47'; Tanasak (yellow card) 51'; Chotipat (yellow card) 59'	Stadium: Buriram City Stadium; Attendance: 523; Referee: Kim Woo-sung (South Korea); Man of the Match: (Turkmenistan) Ruslan Mingazow

22 April 2022 Matchday 2	Vissel Kobe (Japan)	6–0	(Thailand) Chiangrai United	Buriram, Thailand
21:00 UTC+7	Osako 10'; Yuruki 25', 38'; Goke 32'; Lincoln 58', (yellow card) 70'; Osaki 74'	Report	Kato (yellow card) 55'; Tanasak (yellow card) 65'	Stadium: Buriram Stadium; Attendance: 814; Referee: Abdulla Hassan Mohamed (United Arab Emirates); Man of the Match: (Japan) Koya Yuruki

25 April 2022 Matchday 3	Chiangrai United (Thailand)	0–0	(Japan) Vissel Kobe	Buriram, Thailand
21:00 UTC+7	Suriya (yellow card) 8'; Brinner (yellow card) 85'; Chotipat (yellow card) 90+2'	Report		Stadium: Buriram Stadium; Attendance: 546; Referee: Bijan Heydari (Iran); Man of the Match: (Thailand) Saranon Anuin

28 April 2022 Matchday 4	Chiangrai United (Thailand)	2–3	(Hong Kong) Kitchee	Buriram, Thailand
22:00 UTC+7	Phitiwat 45+2' (pen.), (yellow card) 29'; Sarawut 79'; Ryuji (yellow card) 17'; Kato (yellow card) 25'; Gionata (yellow card) 58'	Report	Akande 55'; Damjanović 70', (yellow card) 71'; Law Tsz Chun 81'; Baena (yellow card) 35'	Stadium: Buriram Stadium; Attendance: 304; Referee: Khalid Al-Turais (Saudi Arabia); Man of the Match: (Montenegro) Dejan Damjanović

== Team statistics ==
=== Appearances and goals ===
As of 24 Nov 2021

No.	Pos.	Player	League 1		FA Cup		League Cup		AFC Champions League		Total	
No.	Pos.	Player	Apps.	Goals	Apps.	Goals	Apps.	Goals	Apps.	Goals	Apps.	Goals
1	GK	(Thailand) Saranon Anuin	6	0	2	0	0	0	1	0	7	0
2	DF	(Thailand) Wasan Homsan	13+1	0	0+1	0	0	0	6	0	19	0
3	DF	(Thailand) Tanasak Srisai	7+2	0	1	0	0	0	5+1	0	15	0
4	MF	(Japan) Kohei Kato	0	0	0	0	0	0	0	0	0	0
5	DF	(Brazil) Brinner	13+1	1	1	0	0	0	6	0	19	1
6	MF	(Thailand) Phitiwat Sukjitthammakul	13	1	1	1	0	0	6	1	18	2
7	FW	(Brazil) Felipe Amorim	10+2	3	1	2	0	0	4+2	2	17	5
8	FW	(Brazil) Getterson	0	0	0	0	0	0	0	0	0	0
10	MF	(Thailand) Sivakorn Tiatrakul	13+1	2	1+1	2	0	0	5+1	1	20	5
13	MF	(Thailand) Chotipat Poomkaew	2+6	1	0+1	2	0	0	0+2	0	11	3
14	MF	(Thailand) Sanukran Thinjom	3+9	0	2	2	0	0	5+1	0	19	2
15	MF	(Thailand) Nattawut Jaroenboot	0+3	0	1+1	1	0	0	1+1	0	6	1
16	FW	(Thailand) Akarawin Sawasdee	1+8	1	2	4	0	0	1+4	0	14	4
22	GK	(Thailand) Apirak Worawong	8	0	0	0	0	0	5	0	13	0
27	MF	(Thailand) Gionata Verzura	7+3	0	0	0	0	0	0+5	0	14	0
30	DF	(Thailand) Suriya Singmui	11+2	0	0+2	0	0	0	1+1	0	15	0
33	DF	(Thailand) Sarawut Inpaen	8+4	1	2	1	0	0	3	0	15	1
35	FW	(Thailand) Siroch Chatthong	0	0	0	0	0	0	0	0	0	0
35	FW	(Thailand) Siroch Chatthong	0	0	0	0	0	0	0	0	0	0
36	DF	(Thailand) Shinnaphat Leeaoh	8+6	0	1	0	0	0	4	0	17	0
44	DF	(Thailand) Tora Charoensuk	0	0	1	0	0	0	0	0	1	0
46	MF	(Thailand) Pharadon Pattanapol	0+1	0	1+1	0	0	0	0+2	0	4	0
Players loaned out / left during season
8	MF	(South Korea) Cho Ji-hun	5+2	0	2	1	0	0	5	0	12	1
9	FW	(Brazil) Bill	13	8	1	0	0	0	6	3	20	11
17	FW	(Thailand) Somkid Chamnarnsilp	6+7	0	2	0	0	0	0+4	0	17	0
37	MF	(Thailand) Ekanit Panya	5+6	0	0+1	0	0	0	2+4	1	18	1
