= 2021 Thai FA Cup final =

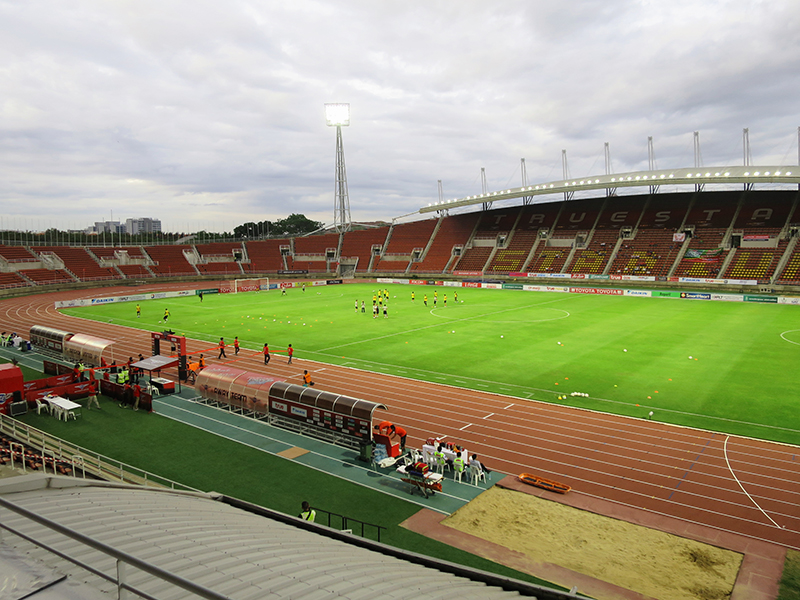
- The match took place at Thammasat Stadium.
- Event: 2020–21 Thai FA Cup
Chiangrai United	Chonburi
1	1
- After extra time Chiangrai United won 4–3 on penalties
- Date: 11 April 2021
- Venue: Thammasat Stadium, Pathum Thani
- Man of the Match: Saranon Anuin (Chiangrai United)
- Referee: Chaireang Ngam-som (Thailand)
- Attendance: 0
- Weather: Cloudy; 27 °C (81 °F) humidity 31%

The 2021 Thai FA Cup final was the final match of the 2020–21 Thai FA Cup, the 27th season of Thailand's national cup competition. It was played at the Thammasat Stadium in Pathum Thani on 11 April 2021 and contested by Chiangrai United and Chonburi.

== Road to the final ==
Chiangrai United (T1)		Round	Chonburi (T1)	
Opponent	Result	Knockout 1 leg	Opponent	Result
Nonthaburi United S.Boonmeerit (T3)	2–1 (H)	Round of 64	Kalasin Sauropods (T4)	7–0 (A)
Sukhothai (T1)	1–0 (H)	Round of 32	Lamphun Warrior (T3)	2–1 (A)
Muang Loei United (T3)	5–2 (A)	Round of 16	Suphanburi (T1)	3–0 (H)
Muangkan United (T3)	2–1 (H)	Quarter-finals	Trat (T1)	5–1 (H)
Bangkok United (T1)	2–1 (N)	Semi-finals	Buriram United (T1)	2–1 (N)

Note: In all results below, the scores of the finalists are given first (H: home; A: away; T1: Clubs from the Thai League 1; T2: Clubs from the Thai League 2; T3: Clubs from the Thai League 3; T4: Clubs from the Thailand Amateur League.

== Match ==
11 April 2021
18:00 UTC+7

Chiangrai United	1 – 1 (a.e.t.)	Chonburi
Sivakorn 40'	Report; Highlight; Full match Ceremony	Chatmongkol 30'
Penalties
Akarawin (penalty scored); Phitiwat (penalty scored); Wasan (penalty scored); Shinnaphat (penalty missed); Chotipat (penalty scored)	4 – 3	(penalty scored) Kritsada; (penalty missed) Eliandro; (penalty scored) Worachit; (penalty scored) Phanuphong; (penalty missed) Kroekrit

Thammasat Stadium, Pathum Thani
Attendance: 0
Referee: Chaireang Ngam-som (Thailand)

Chiangrai United	Chonburi

GK	1	(Thailand) Saranon Anuin
CB	36	(Thailand) Shinnaphat Leeaoh
CB	5	(Brazil) Brinner
CB	3	(Thailand) Tanasak Srisai		(substituted off) 72'
RM	2	(Thailand) Wasan Homsan	(yellow card) 70'
CM	8	(South Korea) Cho Ji-hun		(substituted off) 100'
CM	6	(Thailand) Phitiwat Sukjitthammakul (c)
LM	14	(Thailand) Sanukran Thinjom		(substituted off) 91'
RF	10	(Thailand) Sivakorn Tiatrakul		(substituted off) 72'
CF	9	(Brazil) Bill		(substituted off) 119'
LF	26	(Thailand) Chaiyawat Buran		(substituted off) 46'
Substitutes:
GK	22	(Thailand) Apirak Worawong
DF	30	(Thailand) Suriya Singmui
DF	33	(Thailand) Sarawut Inpaen
MF	13	(Thailand) Chotipat Poomkaew		(substituted on) 72'
MF	18	(Thailand) Thirayu Banhan		(substituted on) 119'
MF	27	(Thailand) Gionata Verzura		(substituted on) 100'
FW	7	(Brazil) Felipe Amorim	(yellow card) 72'	(substituted on) 46'
FW	16	(Thailand) Akarawin Sawasdee		(substituted on) 72'
FW	17	(Thailand) Somkid Chamnarnsilp		(substituted on) 91'
Head coach:
(Brazil) Emerson Pereira

GK	35	(Thailand) Chanin Sae-ear
RB	19	(Thailand) Saharat Sontisawat
CB	98	(Croatia) Renato Kelić
CB	50	(Thailand) Songchai Thongcham
LB	75	(Thailand) Sampan Kesi		(substituted off) 79'
DM	5	(Thailand) Kritsada Kaman
RM	2	(Thailand) Noppanon Kachaplayuk (c)
CM	56	(Thailand) Channarong Promsrikaew		(substituted off) 96'
CM	8	(Thailand) Worachit Kanitsribampen
LM	53	(Thailand) Chatmongkol Rueangthanarot	(yellow card) 49'	(substituted off) 103'
CF	90	(Brazil) Eliandro	(yellow card) 105+1'
Substitutes:
GK	17	(Thailand) Sarut Nasri
GK	30	(Thailand) Chakhon Philakhlang
GK	99	(Thailand) Sinthaweechai Hathairattanakool
DF	52	(Thailand) Pongsakorn Trisat
MF	10	(Thailand) Kroekrit Thaweekarn		(substituted on) 103'
MF	24	(Thailand) Phanuphong Phonsa		(substituted on) 79'
MF	26	(Thailand) Narathip Kruearanya
MF	55	(Thailand) Narutchai Nimboon
FW	27	(Thailand) Settawut Wongsai		(substituted on) 96'
Head coach:
(Thailand) Sasom Pobprasert

Assistant referees:
(Thailand) Pattarapong Kijsathit
(Thailand) Komsan Kampan
Fourth official:
(Thailand) Songkran Bunmeekiart
Video assistant referees:
(Thailand) Teetichai Nualjan
(Thailand) Chaowalit Poonprasit
Match commissioner:
(Thailand) Pakasit Suwannanon
Referee assessor:
(Thailand) Praew Semaksuk
General coordinator:
(Thailand) Kittipon Thongrat

Match rules:

- 90 minutes
- 30 minutes of extra time if scores level
- Penalty shoot-out if scores still level
- Maximum of five substitutions, with a sixth allowed in extra time

== Winners ==
2020–21 Thai FA Cup winners
Chiangrai United
Third title

== Prizes ==
The winners received 5,000,000 THB in prize money, as well as qualification for the 2022 AFC Champions League group stage and the 2021 Thailand Champions Cup.

The runners-up received 1,000,000 THB in prize money.

== See also ==
- 2020–21 Thai League 1
- 2020–21 Thai League 2
- 2020–21 Thai League 3
- 2020–21 Thai FA Cup
- 2020 Thailand Champions Cup
