= 2021 Thailand Champions Cup =

Daikin Thailand Champions Cup
- Event: Thailand Champions Cup
BG Pathum United	Chiangrai United
1	0
- Date: 1 September 2021
- Venue: 700th Anniversary of Chiangmai Stadium, Chiangmai
- Man of the Match: Ryo Matsumura
- Referee: Wiwat Jumpaoon (Thailand)
- Attendance: 0
- Weather: Fair; 27 °C (81 °F) humidity 84%

The 2021 Thailand Champions Cup was the 5th Thailand Champions Cup, an annual football match contested by the winners of the previous season's Thai League 1 and Thai FA Cup competitions. It was sponsored by Daikin, and known as the Daikin Thailand Champions Cup (Thai: ไดกิ้น ไทยแลนด์แชมเปียนส์คัพ) for sponsorship purposes. The match was played on 1 September 2021 at the 700th Anniversary of Chiangmai Stadium in Mae Rim, Chiangmai and contested by 2020–21 Thai League 1 champions BG Pathum United, and Chiangrai United as the champions of the 2020–21 Thai FA Cup. It has live broadcast on Channel 5 HD and AIS Play.

== Qualified teams ==
Team	Qualification	Qualified date	Participation
BG Pathum United	Winners of the 2020–21 Thai League 1	4 March 2021	1st
Chiangrai United	Winners of the 2020–21 Thai FA Cup	11 April 2021	4th

== Match ==
=== Details ===
1 September 2021
18:00 UTC+7

BG Pathum United	1–0	Chiangrai United
Matsumura 87'	Report; News; Highlight; Full match

700th Anniversary of Chiangmai Stadium, Chiangmai
Attendance: 0
Referee: Wiwat Jumpaoon (Thailand)

BG Pathum United	Chiangrai United

Lineups:
GK	1	(Thailand) Chatchai Budprom
RB	23	(Thailand) Santiphap Channgom		(substituted off) 72'
CB	17	(Singapore) Irfan Fandi	(yellow card) 57'
CB	5	(Brazil) Victor Cardozo (c)
LB	39	(Thailand) Yordrak Namuangrak
CM	27	(Philippines) Kevin Ingreso		(substituted off) 72'
CM	6	(Thailand) Sarach Yooyen
RW	7	(Brazil) Diogo	(yellow card) 90+4'
AM	11	(Thailand) Sumanya Purisai		(substituted off) 77'
LW	13	(Thailand) Ernesto Phumipha	(yellow card) 31'	(substituted off) 59'
CF	10	(Thailand) Teerasil Dangda		(substituted off) 59'
Substitutes:
GK	40	(Thailand) Korraphat Nareechan
DF	16	(Thailand) Jakkapan Praisuwan
MF	4	(Thailand) Chaowat Veerachat	(yellow card) 86'	(substituted in) 72'
MF	18	(Thailand) Pathompol Charoenrattanapirom	(yellow card) 90+1'	(substituted in) 77'
MF	24	(Thailand) Chatmongkol Thongkiri
MF	88	(Japan) Ryo Matsumura		(substituted in) 59'
FW	9	(Thailand) Surachat Sareepim		(substituted in) 72'
FW	19	(Thailand) Chenrop Samphaodi
FW	29	(Thailand) Chatree Chimtalay		(substituted in) 59'
Head Coach:
(Australia) Aurelio Vidmar

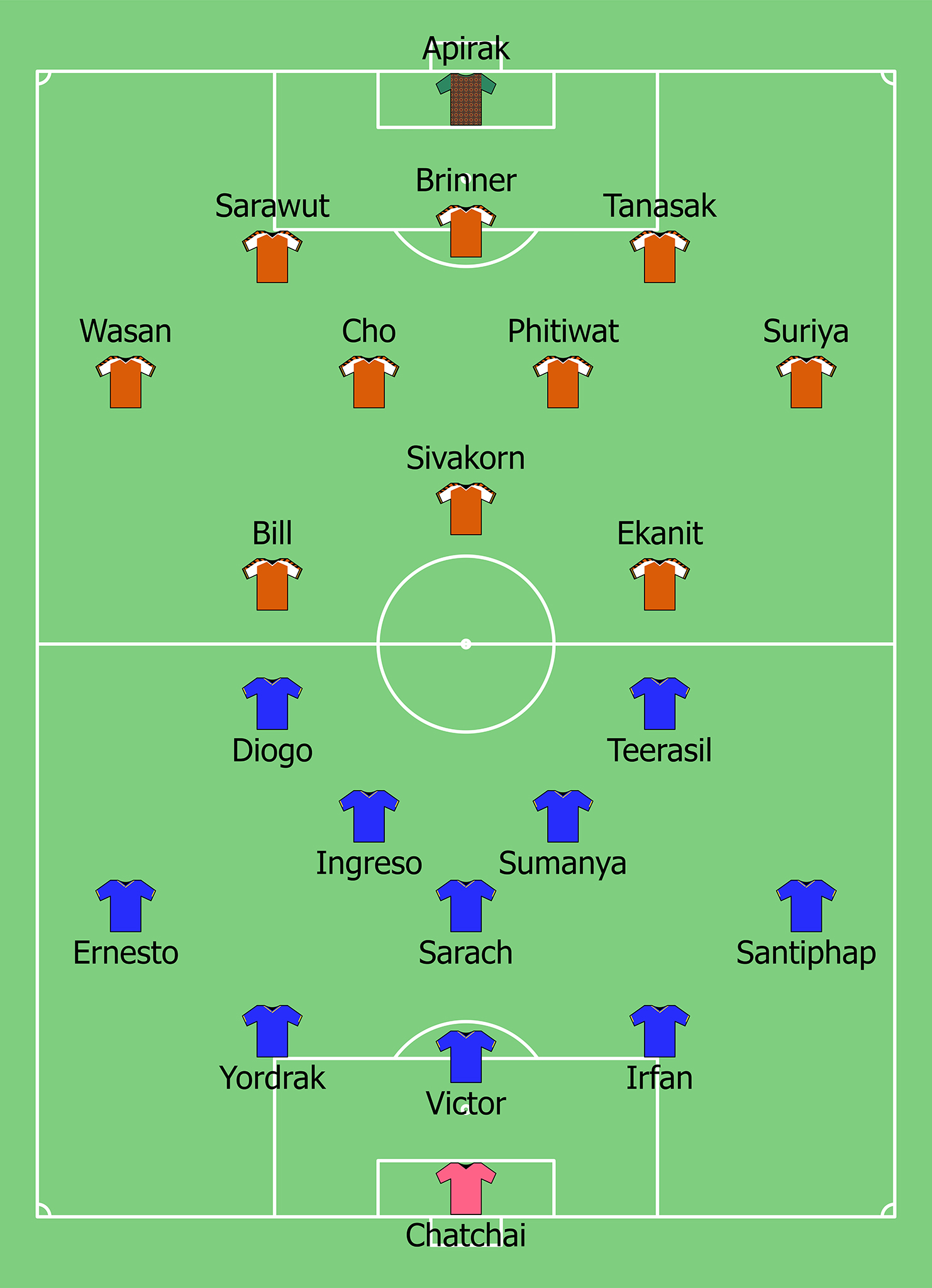

Lineups:
GK	22	(Thailand) Apirak Worawong
CB	33	(Thailand) Sarawut Inpaen
CB	5	(Brazil) Brinner	(red card) 18'
CB	3	(Thailand) Tanasak Srisai		(substituted off) 89'
RM	2	(Thailand) Wasan Homsan
CM	8	(South Korea) Cho Ji-hun		(substituted off) 70'
CM	6	(Thailand) Phitiwat Sukjitthammakul (c)
LM	30	(Thailand) Suriya Singmui	(yellow card) 16'	(substituted off) 70'
AM	37	(Thailand) Ekanit Panya		(substituted off) 23'
AM	10	(Thailand) Sivakorn Tiatrakul		(substituted off) 89'
CF	9	(Brazil) Bill	(yellow card) 45+4'
Substitutes:
GK	1	(Thailand) Saranon Anuin
DF	36	(Thailand) Shinnaphat Leeaoh		(substituted in) 23'
MF	14	(Thailand) Sanukran Thinjom		(substituted in) 70'
MF	15	(Thailand) Nattawut Jaroenboot
MF	27	(Thailand) Gionata Verzura		(substituted in) 70'
MF	46	(Thailand) Pharadon Pattanapol
FW	7	(Brazil) Felipe Amorim
FW	16	(Thailand) Akarawin Sawasdee		(substituted in) 89'
FW	17	(Thailand) Somkid Chamnarnsilp		(substituted in) 89'
Head Coach:
(Brazil) Emerson Pereira

Assistant referees:
(Thailand) Rachen Srichai
(Thailand) Worapong Prasertsri
Fourth official:
(Thailand) Natee Chusuwan
Assistant VAR:
(Thailand) Torpong Somsing
(Thailand) Rachan Dawangpa
Match Commissioner:
(Thailand) Khajorn Treesophanakorn
Referee Assessor:
(Thailand) Preecha Kangram
General Coordinator:
(Thailand) Narubet Kietprasert

MATCH RULES

- 90 minutes.
- Penalty shoot-out if necessary.
- Maximum of five substitutions in three times.

== Winner ==
2021 Thailand Champions Cup
Winners
BG Pathum United
First Title

== See also ==
- 2021–22 Thai League 1
- 2021–22 Thai League 2
- 2021–22 Thai League 3
- 2021–22 Thai League 3 Northern Region
- 2021–22 Thai League 3 Northeastern Region
- 2021–22 Thai League 3 Eastern Region
- 2021–22 Thai League 3 Western Region
- 2021–22 Thai League 3 Southern Region
- 2021–22 Thai League 3 Bangkok Metropolitan Region
- 2021–22 Thai League 3 National Championship
- 2021–22 Thai FA Cup
- 2021–22 Thai League Cup
