= 2019 Thailand Champions Cup =

Omsin Thailand Champions Cup
- Event: Thailand Champions Cup
Buriram United	Chiangrai United
3	1
- Date: 2 February 2019
- Venue: Royal Thai Army Stadium, Bangkok
- Man of the Match: Supachai Jaided
- Referee: Wiwat Champa-on (Thailand)
- Attendance: 6,550
- Weather: Fog; 29 °C (84 °F) humidity 77%

The 2019 Thailand Champions Cup was the 3rd Thailand Champions Cup, an annual football match contested by the winners of the previous season's Thai League 1 and Thai FA Cup competitions. It was sponsored by Government Savings Bank (Omsin Bank), and known as the Omsin Thailand Champions Cup (Thai: ออมสิน ไทยแลนด์แชมเปียนส์คัพ) for sponsorship purposes. The match was played at Royal Thai Army Stadium, Bangkok and contested by 2018 Thai League 1 champions Buriram United, and Chiangrai United as the champions of the 2018 Thai FA Cup.

== Qualified teams ==
Team	Qualification	Qualified date	Participation
Buriram United	Winners of the 2018 Thai League 1	7 October 2018	2nd
Chiangrai United	Winners of the 2018 Thai FA Cup	27 October 2018	2nd

== Match ==
=== Details ===
2 February 2019
19:00 UTC+7

Buriram United	3 – 1	Chiangrai United
Supachai 42', 45+1'; Maïga 90'	Report; Highlight	Brinner 2'

Royal Thai Army Stadium, Bangkok
Attendance: 6,550
Referee: Wiwat Champa-on (Thailand)

Buriram United	Chiangrai United

Lineups:
GK	1	(Thailand) Siwarak Tedsungnoen
DF	3	(Thailand) Pansa Hemviboon
DF	5	(Venezuela) Andrés Túñez
DF	6	(Thailand) Sasalak Haiprakhon
DF	11	(Thailand) Korrakot Wiriyaudomsiri
DF	30	(Philippines) Stephan Palla
MF	8	(Thailand) Suchao Nuchnum (c)			(substituted off) 46'
MF	19	(Thailand) Supachok Sarachat			(substituted off) 90+3'
MF	26	(Thailand) Ratthanakorn Maikami
FW	9	(Thailand) Supachai Jaided	42', 45+1'		(substituted off) 90+5'
FW	25	(Mali) Modibo Maïga	90'	(yellow card) 38'
Substitutes:
GK	29	(Thailand) Yotsapon Teangdar
DF	18	(Thailand) Apiwat Ngaolamhin
MF	10	(Thailand) Jakkaphan Kaewprom		(yellow card) 70'	(substituted on) 46'
MF	31	(Thailand) Anuwat Noicheunphan
MF	62	(Thailand) Airfan Doloh
MF	88	(Thailand) Watcharakorn Manoworn
FW	17	(Brazil) Osvaldo
FW	20	(Philippines) Javier Patiño			(substituted on) 90+3'
FW	54	(Thailand) Suphanat Mueanta			(substituted on) 90+5'
Head Coach:
(Montenegro) Božidar Bandović

Lineups:
GK	1	(Thailand) Saranon Anuin
DF	5	(Brazil) Brinner	2'
DF	30	(Thailand) Suriya Singmui		(yellow card) 83'
DF	33	(Thailand) Sarawut Inpaen
DF	36	(Thailand) Shinnaphat Leeaoh
MF	6	(Thailand) Phitiwat Sukjitthammakul		(yellow card) 73'
MF	8	(South Korea) Lee Yong-rae
MF	10	(Thailand) Sivakorn Tiatrakul			(substituted off) 79'
MF	11	(Brazil) William Henrique			(substituted off) 66'
MF	23	(Thailand) Peerapong Pichitchotirat (c)			(substituted off) 66'
FW	9	(Brazil) Bill		(yellow card) 68' (yellow-red card) 90+3'
Substitutes:
GK	22	(Thailand) Apirak Woravong
DF	3	(Thailand) Tanasak Srisai
MF	17	(Thailand) Kritsana Kasemkulvilai
MF	18	(Thailand) Chaiyawat Buran			(substituted on) 66'
MF	37	(Thailand) Ekanit Panya			(substituted on) 66'
MF	40	(Thailand) Decha Sa-ardchom
MF	45	(Thailand) Adisak Klinkosoom			(substituted on) 79'
MF	46	(Thailand) Pharadon Pattanapol
FW	19	(Thailand) Akarawin Sawasdee
Head Coach:
(Brazil) Jose Alves Borges

Assistant referees:
(Thailand) Phattharaphong Kitsathit
(Thailand) Aphichit Nophuan
Fourth official:
(Thailand) Sivakorn Pu-udom

MATCH RULES

- 90 minutes.
- Penalty shoot-out if necessary.
- Maximum of three substitutions.

== Winner ==
2019 Thailand Champions Cup
winners

First title

== See also ==
- 2019 Thai League 1
- 2019 Thai League 2
- 2019 Thai League 3
- 2019 Thai League 4
- 2019 Thai FA Cup
- 2019 Thai League Cup
