= 2017 Chiangrai United F.C. season =

Chiangrai United
2017 season
- Chairman: Mitti Tiyapairat
- Manager: Alexandre Gama
- Stadium: United Stadium, Mueang Chiangrai, Chiangrai, Thailand
- Thai League T1: 4th
- Thai FA Cup: Winners
- Thai League Cup: Runners-up
- Top goalscorer: League: Felipe Azevedo (18); All: Felipe Azevedo (28)

The 2017 season is Chiangrai United's 7th season in the Thai League T1 since 2011.

== Thai League ==
Date	Opponents	H / A	Result F–A	Scorers	League position
12 February 2017	Super Power Samut Prakan	H	4–0	Thitipan (3) 23', 53', 81', Felipe 89'	1st
18 February 2017	Sisaket	H	3–1	Coelho (2) 17', 71', Henrique 90+2'	1st
26 February 2017	Ratchaburi Mitr Phol	A	1–1	Thossawat 59'	3rd
5 March 2017	Suphanburi	H	2–0	Vander 69' (pen.), Thossawat 83'	2nd
8 March 2017	Bangkok United	A	3–0	Thossawat 47', Tanaboon 52', Coelho 70' (pen.)	3rd
11 March 2017	Navy	H	3–2	Everton 75', Coelho (2) 84', 86'	2nd
3 April 2017	Thai Honda Ladkrabang	A	3–0	Coelho 1', Felipe 15', Vander 47' (pen.)	1st
9 April 2017	Port	H	1–3	Felipe 15'	2nd
19 April 2017	Ubon UMT United	A	2–1	Felipe 40' (pen.), Vander 73'	2nd
23 April 2017	Buriram United	H	1–2	Vander 14'	3rd
30 April 2017	Bangkok Glass	H	3–0	Coelho 32', Felipe 62', Sivakorn 84'	3rd
3 May 2017	Sukhothai	A	2–2	Felipe (2) 59', 70' (pen.)	3rd
7 May 2017	BEC Tero Sasana	H	1–1	Felipe 77'	3rd
12 May 2017	Chonburi	A	1–3	Felipe 16' (pen.)	3rd
17 May 2017	Pattaya United	H	4–1	Coelho (3) 48', 65', 79', Piyaphon 53'	3rd
20 May 2017	Nakhon Ratchasima Mazda	A	1–0	Felipe 81'	3rd
2 June 2017	SCG Muangthong United	A	2–4	Coelho 51', Piyaphon 84'	3rd
18 June 2017	Sisaket	A	2–1	Chalitpong 44' (o.g.), Felipe 88'	4th
24 June 2017	Ratchaburi Mitr Phol	H	4–0	Piyaphon 12', Everton 16', Akarawin 33', Felipe 76'	3rd
28 June 2017	Suphanburi	A	2–1	Akarawin 39', Felipe 63'	3rd
1 July 2017	Bangkok United	H	0–2		3rd
5 July 2017	Navy	A	0–2		4th
9 July 2017	Thai Honda Ladkrabang	H	3–1	Piyaphon 34', Chaiyawat 60', Pathompol 90'	4th
30 July 2017	Port	A	2–1	Pratum 17', Felipe 67'	4th
5 August 2017	Ubon UMT United	H	1–1	Felipe 16' (pen.)	4th
10 September 2017	Buriram United	A	0–1		4th
17 September 2017	Bangkok Glass	A	1–2	Felipe 45+1'	5th
20 September 2017	Sukhothai	H	6–0	Shinnaphat 19', Jandson (3) 22', 52', 88', Thitipan 65', Pathompol 85'	4th
14 October 2017	Chonburi	H	3–1	Felipe 42', Everton 47', Vander 68'	4th
22 October 2017	Pattaya United	A	2–2	Felipe 51', Thitipan 85'	4th
8 November 2017	Nakhon Ratchasima Mazda	H	1–0	Pratum 90+4'	4th
12 November 2017	SCG Muangthong United	H	0–1		4th
15 November 2017	BEC Tero Sasana	A	1–3	Coelho 60'	4th
18 November 2017	Super Power Samut Prakan	A	2–2	Akarawin 23', Narachai 53'	4th

Pos	Team	Pld	W	D	L	GF	GA	GD	Pts	Qualification or relegation
2	SCG Muangthong United (Q)	34	22	6	6	79	29	+50	72	Qualification to 2018 AFC Champions League Preliminary round 2
3	Bangkok United	34	21	3	10	97	57	+40	66	
4	Chiangrai United (Q)	34	18	6	10	67	42	+25	60	Qualification to 2018 AFC Champions League Preliminary round 2 (Note: Chiangrai United qualified for the 2018 AFC Champions League Preliminary round 2 as winners of the 2017 Thai FA Cup.)
5	Bangkok Glass	34	16	8	10	63	44	+19	56	
6	Ratchaburi Mitr Phol	34	16	7	11	63	49	+14	55	

Updated to match(es) played on 18 November 2017. Source: Thai League
Rules for classification: 1) Points; 2) Head-to-head points; 3) Head-to-head goals difference; 4) Head-to-head goals scored; 5) Overall goals difference; 6) Overall goals scored; 7) Fair play points; 8) Play-off without extra time;).
(Q) Qualified for the phase indicated

== Thai FA Cup ==
Date	Opponents	H / A	Result F–A	Scorers	Round
21 June 2017	BTU United	H	9–0	Akarawin (3) 20', 32', 45', Felipe (2) 23', 38', Pathompol (2) 26', 70', Sivakorn 58', Vander 73'	Round of 64
2 August 2017	Sukhothai	A	1–0	Felipe 62'	Round of 32
27 September 2017	BEC Tero Sasana	H	3–1 (a.e.t.)	Felipe (2) 99', 109', Vander 117' (pen.)	Round of 16
18 October 2017	Buriram United	H	1–0	Felipe 81'	Quarter-finals
1 November 2017	SCG Muangthong United	N	2–2 (a.e.t.) (4–3p)	Suriya 53', Sivakorn 73'	Semi-finals
25 November 2017	Bangkok United	N	4–2	Everton 25', Coelho 58', Vander (2) 81', 90+3' (pen.)	Final

== Thai League Cup ==
Date	Opponents	H / A	Result F–A	Scorers	Round
26 July 2017	Trang	A	3–1	Felipe 7', Piyaphon 35', Sivakorn 68'	Round of 32
1 October 2017	Rayong	A	4–0	Jandson 14', Coelho (2) 30', 46', Thitipan 45'	Round of 16
11 October 2017	Ubon UMT United	H	4–1	Piyaphon 43', Jandson 51', Felipe (2) 60', 65'	Quarter-finals
4 November 2017	Ratchaburi Mitr Phol	N	1–0	Felipe 14'	Semi-finals
22 November 2017	SCG Muangthong United	N	0–2		Final

== Reserve team in Thai League 4 ==
Chiangrai United send the reserve team to compete in T4 Northern Region as Chiangrai United B.

Date	Opponents	H / A	Result F–A	Scorers	League position
11 February 2017	Nakhon Sawan	A	0–1		8th
18 February 2017	Paknampho NSRU	A	1–3	Thitinan 53'	9th
25 February 2017	Chiangrai City	H	1–2	Witthawat 50'	8th
4 March 2017	Nan	A	0–3		9th
12 March 2017	Tak City	H	2–1	Dechochai 35', Siriphong 49'	8th
19 March 2017	JL Chiangmai United	A	1–3	Siriphong 42' (pen.)	8th
26 March 2017	Phitsanulok	A	1–9	Chaiyahan 21' (pen.)	9th
3 April 2017	Uttaradit	A	2–5	Chaiyahan 48', Worawich 50'	9th
1 May 2017	Nakhon Sawan	H	3–1	Thitinan 46', Chotipat (2) 77', 90+4'	9th
8 May 2017	Paknampho NSRU	H	1–1	Henrique 23'	9th
13 May 2017	Chiangrai City	A	1–3	Saksit 37'	9th
21 May 2017	Nan	H	1–2	Krissadee 70'	9th
28 May 2017	Tak City	A	0–5		9th
19 June 2017	JL Chiangmai United	H	0–4		9th
25 June 2017	Phitsanulok	H	0–1		9th
2 July 2017	Uttaradit	H	0–2		9th
16 July 2017	Nakhon Sawan	H	0–0		9th
23 July 2017	Paknampho NSRU	A	1–9	Teerapat 12'	9th
29 July 2017	Chiangrai City	A	1–4	Piyarot 28'	9th
6 August 2017	Nan	A	0–2		9th
13 August 2017	Tak City	A	0–3		9th
20 August 2017	JL Chiangmai United	A	0–4		9th
27 August 2017	Phitsanulok	A	2–0	Piyaphon 45', Jandson 62' (pen.)	9th
2 September 2017	Uttaradit	A	0–0		9th

Pos	Team	Pld	W	D	L	GF	GA	GD	Pts	Qualification or relegation
5	Nan	24	11	7	6	28	20	+8	40	
6	Nakhon Sawan	24	7	4	13	29	36	−7	25	
7	Tak City	24	6	4	14	24	33	−9	22	
8	Paknampho NSRU (R)	24	4	8	12	31	45	−14	20	Relegation to the 2018 Thailand Amateur League
9	Chiangrai United B (Note: Chiangrai United B was docked 3 points due to decision of FA Thailand about rule breaking of foreign players. They have finished lower than 6th place. So, they could not compete in T4 for one season by the rules of FA Thailand.)	24	3	3	18	18	68	−50	9	Could not compete in 2018 Thai League 4

Updated to match(es) played on 20 October 2017. Source: Thai League 4
Rules for classification: 1) Points; 2) Head-to-head points; 3) Head-to-head goals difference; 4) Head-to-head goals scored; 5) Overall goals difference; 6) Overall goals scored; 7) Fair play points; 8) Play-off without extra time;).
(R) Relegated

== Squad statistics ==
Statistics accurate as of 19 February 2017.

No.	Pos.	Name	League		FA Cup		League Cup		Total	
No.	Pos.	Name	Apps	Goals	Apps	Goals	Apps	Goals	Apps	Goals
1	GK	(Thailand) Chatchai Budprom	1	0	0	0	0	0	0	0
2	DF	(Thailand) Atit Daosawang	8	0	0	0	0	0	0	0
3	DF	(Thailand) Krissadee Prakobkong	5(1)	0	0	0	0	0	0(1)	0
4	DF	(Thailand) Piyaphon Phanichakul	30(1)	4	0	0	0	0	2	0
5	DF	(Thailand) Pratum Chuthong	21(2)	2	0	0	0	0	2	0
6	MF	(Thailand) Phitiwat Sukjitthammakul	14(9)	0	0	0	0	0	0(1)	0
8	MF	(Thailand) Thitipan Puangchan	2	3	0	0	0	0	2	3
9	FW	(Brazil) Rafael Coelho	2	2	0	0	0	0	2	2
10	MF	(Brazil) Vander Souza	2	0	0	0	0	0	2	0
11	MF	(Brazil) Felipe Azevedo	2	1	0	0	0	0	2	1
13	MF	(Thailand) Saharat Kaewsangsai	0	0	0	0	0	0	0	0
14	MF	(Thailand) Pathompol Charoenrattanapirom	0	0	0	0	0	0	0	0
15	FW	(Australia) Henrique Silva	0(2)	1	0	0	0	0	0(2)	1
17	MF	(Thailand) Tanaboon Kesarat	2	0	0	0	0	0	2	0
18	GK	(Thailand) Pattara Piyapatrakitti	2	0	0	0	0	0	2	0
20	GK	(Thailand) Nont Muangngam	0	0	0	0	0	0	0	0
21	MF	(Thailand) Sivakorn Tiatrakul	2	0	0	0	0	0	2	0
23	GK	(Thailand) Sarawut Konglarp	0	0	0	0	0	0	0	0
24	DF	(Thailand) Worawut Namvech	0	0	0	0	0	0	0	0
28	DF	(Brazil) Everton Gonçalves Saturnino	2	0	0	0	0	0	2	0
29	DF	(Thailand) Kiatprawut Saiwaeo	0	0	0	0	0	0	0	0
30	DF	(Thailand) Suriya Singmui	2	0	0	0	0	0	2	0
33	MF	(Thailand) Chotipat Poomkeaw	0	0	0	0	0	0	0	0
36	DF	(Thailand) Shinnaphat Lee-Oh	0	0	0	0	0	0	0	0
37	MF	(Thailand) Ekanit Panya	0	0	0	0	0	0	0	0
38	MF	(Thailand) Thossawat Limwannasathian	0(2)	0	0	0	0	0	0(2)	0
	FW	(Australia) Mark Bridge	0	0	0	0	0	0	0	0

== Transfers ==
First Thai footballer's market is opening on 14 December 2016 to 28 January 2017
Second Thai footballer's market is opening on 3 June 2017 to 30 June 2017

=== In ===
Date	Pos.	Name	From
19 October 2016	GK	(Thailand) Chatchai Budprom	(Thailand) Super Power Samut Prakan
4 November 2016	DF	(Thailand) Suriya Singmui	(Thailand) SCG Muangthong United
4 November 2016	MF	(Thailand) Tanaboon Kesarat	(Thailand) SCG Muangthong United
4 November 2016	MF	(Thailand) Sivakorn Tiatrakul	(Thailand) BEC Tero Sasana
4 November 2016	MF	(Thailand) Phitiwat Sukjitthammakul	(Thailand) BEC Tero Sasana
4 November 2016	MF	(Thailand) Pathompol Charoenrattanapirom	(Thailand) Pattaya United
4 November 2016	DF	(Thailand) Shinnaphat Leeaoh	(Thailand) Pattaya United
26 December 2016	GK	(Thailand) Pattara Piyapatrakitti	(Thailand) SCG Muangthong United
28 December 2016	GK	(Thailand) Sarawut Konglarp	(Thailand) Bangkok Glass
29 December 2016	MF	(Brazil) Vander Souza	(Brazil) Vitória
29 December 2016	MF	(Brazil) Felipe Azevedo	(Brazil) Ponte Preta
5 January 2017	DF	(Brazil) Everton	(Brazil) Luverdense
29 January 2017	FW	(Australia) Henrique Silva	(Australia) Adelaide United
29 May 2017	MF	(Thailand) Chaiyawat Buran	(Thailand) SCG Muangthong United
12 June 2017	DF	(Thailand) Atit Daosawang	(Thailand) BEC Tero Sasana
12 June 2017	FW	(Thailand) Akarawin Sawasdee	(Thailand) BBCU
12 June 2017	MF	(Thailand) Thanawich Kamna	(Thailand) Thai Honda Ladkrabang
12 June 2017	DF	(Thailand) Watcharin Nuengprakaew	(Thailand) Thai Honda Ladkrabang

=== Out ===
Date	Pos.	Name	To
27 October 2016	GK	(Thailand) Intharat Apinyakool	(Thailand) Navy
2 November 2016	MF	(Thailand) Pichitphong Choeichiu	(Thailand) BEC Tero Sasana
2 November 2016	GK	(Thailand) Thanongsak Panpipat	(Thailand) Super Power Samut Prakan
2 November 2016	MF	(Thailand) Yuttajak Kornchan	(Thailand) Navy
2 November 2016	FW	(Thailand) Anon Sangsanoi	(Thailand) Nakhon Pathom United
2 November 2016	MF	(Thailand) Nattapon Woratayanan	(Thailand) PTT Rayong
2 November 2016	MF	(Brazil) Wellington Bruno	(Thailand) Chiangmai
2 November 2016	DF	(Japan) Kazuki Murakami	(Thailand) PTT Rayong
2 November 2016	MF	(Japan) Hironori Saruta	(Thailand) Udon Thani
2 November 2016	FW	(Namibia) Lazarus Kaimbi	(Thailand) Suphanburi
4 November 2016	FW	(Brazil) Dennis Murillo	(Thailand) PTT Rayong
30 November 2016	FW	(Thailand) Choklap Nilsang	(Thailand) Super Power Samut Prakan
21 January 2017	MF	(Thailand) Arthit Sunthornpit	(Thailand) PTT Rayong
2 February 2017	MF	(Thailand) Bordin Phala	(Thailand) Buriram United
2 February 2017	DF	(Thailand) Saranyu Intarach	(Thailand) BBCU
2 February 2017	FW	(Thailand) Nantawat Tansopa	(Thailand) Chiangrai City
2 February 2017	FW	(Thailand) Chatchai Narkwijit	(Thailand) Phrae United

=== Loan in ===
Date from	Date to	Pos.	Name	From
29 December 2016	31 May 2017	MF	(Thailand) Thossawat Limwannasathian	(Thailand) Army United
6 January 2017	31 December 2017	FW	(Brazil) Rafael Coelho	(India) FC Goa

=== Loan out ===
Date from	Date to	Pos.	Name	To
9 November 2016	31 December 2017	MF	(Thailand) Wanchalerm Yingyong	(Thailand) Port
6 January 2017	31 December 2017	GK	(Thailand) Apirak Woravong	(Thailand) Army United
9 June 2017	31 December 2017	GK	(Thailand) Sarawut Konglarp	(Thailand) Sisaket
