= 2018 Thailand Champions Cup =

Omsin Thailand Champions Cup
- Event: Thailand Champions Cup
Buriram United	Chiangrai United
2	2
- Chiangrai United won 6–5 on penalties
- Date: 19 January 2018
- Venue: Supachalasai Stadium, Bangkok
- Man of the Match: Victor Cardozo
- Referee: Sivakorn Pu-udom (Thailand)
- Attendance: 12,560
- Weather: Clear; 31 °C (88 °F) humidity 48%

The 2018 Thailand Champions Cup was the 2nd Thailand Champions Cup, an annual football match contested by the winners of the previous season's Thai League 1 and Thai FA Cup competitions. It was sponsored by Government Savings Bank (Omsin Bank), and known as the Omsin Thailand Champions Cup (Thai: ออมสิน ไทยแลนด์แชมเปียนส์คัพ) for sponsorship purposes. The match was played at Supachalasai Stadium, Bangkok and contested by 2017 Thai League T1 champions Buriram United, and Chiangrai United as the champions of the 2017 Thai FA Cup.

== Qualified teams ==
Team	Qualification	Qualified date	Participation
Buriram United	Winners of the 2017 Thai League T1	8 November 2017	1st
Chiangrai United	Winners of the 2017 Thai FA Cup	25 November 2017	1st

== Match ==
=== Details ===
19 January 2018
19:00 UTC+7

Buriram United	2 – 2	Chiangrai United
Edgar 5'; Diogo 34'	Report; Highlight	Sivakorn 45+2'; Victor 67'
Penalties
Túñez (penalty scored); Suchao (penalty scored); Supachai (penalty missed); Edgar (penalty missed); Siwarak (penalty scored); Anon (penalty scored); Jakkaphan (penalty missed); Samson (penalty missed); Ratthanakorn (penalty scored); Túñez (penalty missed)	5 – 6	(penalty missed) Cleiton; (penalty scored) Macena; (penalty scored) Phitiwat; (penalty scored) Victor; (penalty missed) Chatchai; (penalty scored) Tanasak; (penalty missed) Shinnaphat; (penalty missed) Mongkol; (penalty scored) Piyaphon; (penalty scored) Cleiton

Supachalasai Stadium, Bangkok
Attendance: 12,560
Referee: Sivakorn Pu-udom (Thailand)

Buriram United	Chiangrai United

Lineups:
GK	1	(Thailand) Siwarak Tedsungnoen
DF	3	(Thailand) Pansa Hemviboon
DF	5	(Venezuela) Andrés Túñez
DF	50	(Thailand) Kritsana Daokrajai			(substituted off) 69'
MF	8	(Thailand) Suchao Nuchnum (c)
MF	11	(Thailand) Korrakot Wiriyaudomsiri			(substituted off) 67'
MF	10	(Thailand) Jakkaphan Kaewprom
MF	19	(Thailand) Supachok Sarachat			(substituted off) 84'
MF	26	(Thailand) Ratthanakorn Maikami
FW	9	(Brazil) Edgar	5'
FW	40	(Brazil) Diogo Luís Santo	34'	(red card) 89'
Substitutes:
GK	29	(Thailand) Yotsapon Teangdar
DF	33	(Thailand) Sarayut Sompim
DF	53	(Thailand) Sarawut Munjit
DF	60	(Thailand) Khiron Oonchaiyaphum
MF	7	(Thailand) Anon Amornlerdsak			(substituted on) 67'
MF	51	(Thailand) Panyawat Nisangram
FW	9	(Thailand) Supachai Jaided			(substituted on) 69'
FW	22	(Vietnam) Hoàng Vũ Samson			(substituted on) 84'
Head Coach:
(Montenegro) Božidar Bandović

Lineups:
GK	1	(Thailand) Chatchai Budprom
DF	2	(Thailand) Atit Daosawang		(yellow card) 21' (yellow-red card) 36'
DF	4	(Thailand) Piyaphon Phanichakul
DF	5	(Brazil) Victor Cardozo	34'
DF	36	(Thailand) Shinnaphat Leeaoh		(yellow card) 21'
MF	6	(Thailand) Phitiwat Sukjitthammakul
MF	8	(South Korea) Lee Yong-rae
MF	10	(Thailand) Sivakorn Tiatrakul	45+2'		(substituted off) 80'
MF	18	(Thailand) Chaiyawat Buran			(substituted off) 46'
FW	11	(Brazil) Gilberto Macena (c)
FW	23	(Brazil) Cleiton Silva
Substitutes:
GK	28	(Thailand) Saranon Anuin
DF	3	(Thailand) Tanasak Srisai			(substituted on) 46'
DF	24	(Thailand) Worawut Namvech
DF	30	(Thailand) Suriya Singmui
DF	33	(Thailand) Sarawut Inpaen
MF	21	(Thailand) Pathompol Charoenrattanapirom
FW	9	(Thailand) Mongkol Tossakrai			(substituted on) 80'
FW	16	(Thailand) Akarawin Sawasdee
FW	37	(Myanmar) Kyaw Ko Ko
Head Coach:
(Brazil) Alexandre Gama

Assistant referees:
(Thailand) Pattarapong Kusathit
(Thailand) Rawut Nakarit
Fourth official:
(Thailand) Mongkolchai Pechsri

MATCH RULES

- 90 minutes.
- Penalty shoot-out if necessary.
- Maximum of three substitutions.

== Winner ==
2018 Thailand Champions Cup
winners

First title

== See also ==
- 2018 Thai League
- 2018 Thai League 2
- 2018 Thai League 3
- 2018 Thai League 4
- 2018 Thailand Amateur League
- 2018 Thai FA Cup
- 2018 Thai League Cup
