= Ryo Matsumura =

Japanese footballer

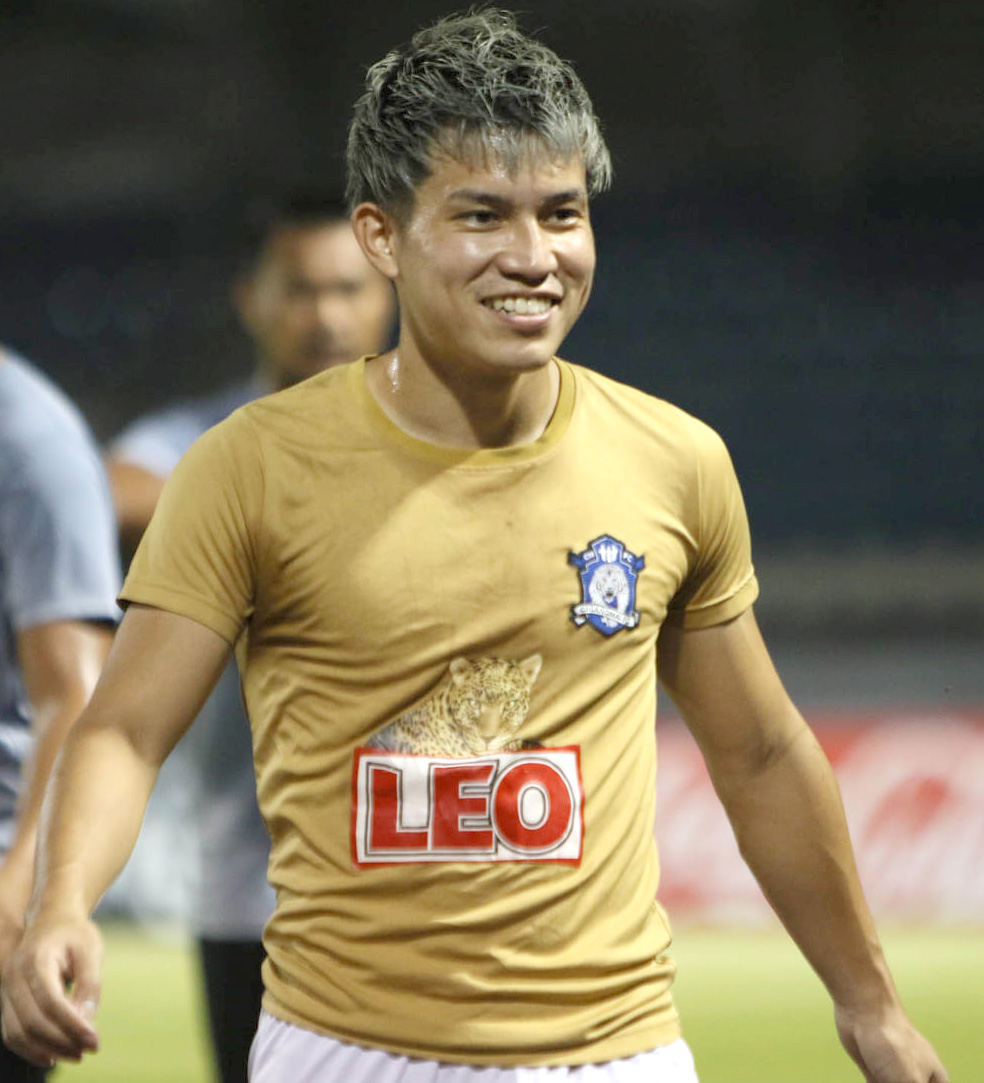
- Matsumura with Chiangmai in 2021

Personal information
- Full name: Ryo Matsumura
- Date of birth: 15 June 1994 (age 32)
- Place of birth: Uji, Japan
- Height: 1.68 m (5 ft 6 in)
- Positions: Attacking midfielder; winger

Team information
- Current team: Garudayaksa
- Number: 10

Youth career
- 2010–2012: Vissel Kobe

Senior career*
Years	Team	Apps	(Gls)
2013–2018	Vissel Kobe	33	(2)
2014	→ J. League U22 Selection (loan)	2	(1)
2015	→ Tochigi SC (loan)	23	(0)
2017	→ Tokushima Vortis (loan)	4	(0)
2018	Nagano Parceiro	22	(0)
2019	Rayong	32	(10)
2020–2021	Chiangmai	34	(16)
2021–2023	BG Pathum United	6	(0)
2021–2022	→ Police Tero (loan)	10	(0)
2022–2023	→ Persis Solo (loan)	28	(11)
2023–2026	Persija Jakarta	68	(17)
2026	→ Bhayangkara Presisi (loan)	12	(2)
2026–	Garudayaksa	1	(0)
- * Club domestic league appearances and goals as of 6 September 2026

Ryo Matsumura (松村 亮, born 15 June 1994) is a Japanese professional footballer who plays as an attacking midfielder or a winger for Super League club Garudayaksa.

== Honours ==
BG Pathum United

- Thailand Champions Cup (1): 2021

Individual

- Liga 1 Goal of the Month: August 2024, January 2025
