= Chatchai Budprom =

Thai footballer

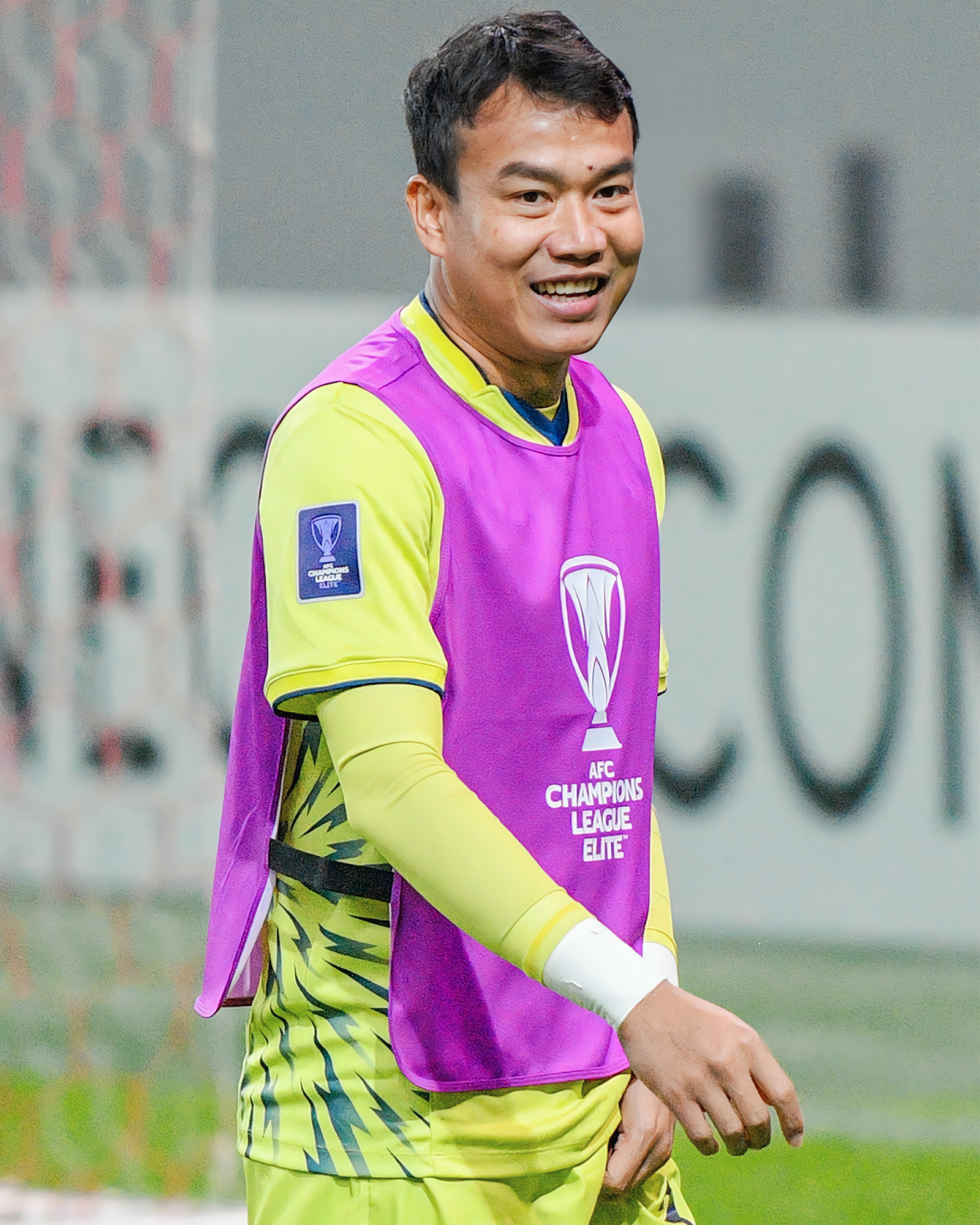
- Budprom with Buriram United, 2025

Personal information
- Full name: Chatchai Budprom
- Date of birth: 4 February 1987 (age 39)
- Place of birth: Kamphaeng Phet, Thailand
- Height: 1.86 m (6 ft 1 in)
- Position: Goalkeeper

Team information
- Current team: Buriram United
- Number: 34

Youth career
- 2005–2006: Osotspa
- 2006: Nakhon Sawan

Senior career*
Years	Team	Apps	(Gls)
2007–2009	Nakhon Sawan	32	(0)
2010–2016	Super Power Samut Prakan	124	(0)
2017–2018	Chiangrai United	30	(0)
2019–2024	BG Pathum United	64	(0)
2023	→ PT Prachuap (loan)	10	(0)
2024	→ PT Prachuap (loan)	21	(0)
2024–	Buriram United	1	(0)

International career^{‡}
2013–	Thailand	20	(0)
Medal record
Thailand
Asean Football Championship
Winner	Suzuki Cup 2020	Team
Runner-up	Hyundai Cup 2026	Team
- * Club domestic league appearances and goals as of 9 August 2024 ‡ National team caps and goals as of 26 August 2026

Chatchai Budprom (Thai: ฉัตรชัย บุตรพรม, born February 4, 1987) is a Thai professional footballer who plays as a goalkeeper for Buriram United.

== International career ==
Chatchai was called up several times by Thailand's former coach Winfried Schäfer. In 2013, he debuted for Thailand in a friendly match against Bhutan. Chatchai also played in the 2013 King's Cup against North Korea. In 2013 Chatchai was called up to the national team by Surachai Jaturapattarapong to the 2015 AFC Asian Cup qualification. In May 2015, he was called up to Thailand to play in the 2018 FIFA World Cup qualification (AFC) against Vietnam.

Chatchai was the first-choice keeper for Thailand in the 2020 AFF Championship. However, he suffered an injury sidelining him for 8 months, while playing against Vietnam in the second leg of the tournament's semi-finals.

== Style of play ==
Chatchai is known as one of the Thai goalkeepers who can play as a sweeper keeper. Thai football fans have noted him as a goalkeeper who plays well with his feet and can intercept the ball outside the goal line.

== Honours ==
=== Club ===
Chiangrai United

- Thai FA Cup: 2017, 2018
- Thailand Champions Cup: 2018
- Thai League Cup: 2018

BG Pathum United

- Thai League 1: 2020–21
- Thai League 2: 2019
- Thailand Champions Cup: 2021, 2022

Buriram United

- Thai League 1: 2024–25, 2025–26
- Thai FA Cup: 2024–25, 2025–26
- Thai League Cup: 2024–25
- ASEAN Club Championship: 2024–25, 2025–26

=== International ===
Thailand

- AFF Championship: 2020

=== Individual ===
- Thai League 1 Best XI: 2020–21
- ASEAN Club Championship: Best Goalkeeper 2024–25
- ASEAN Club Championship: Allstar XI 2024–25
