= Sarawut Yodyinghathaikul =

Thai footballer (born 1999)

Personal information
- Full name: Sarawut Yodyinghathaikul
- Date of birth: 6 March 1999 (age 27)
- Place of birth: Chiang Mai, Thailand
- Height: 1.65 m (5 ft 5 in)
- Position: Right-back

Youth career
- 2014–2016: Chiangrai United

Senior career*
Years	Team	Apps	(Gls)
2017–2023	Chiangrai United	6	(0)
2018	→ Chiangrai City (loan)		
2018	→ JL Chiangmai (loan)		
2020	→ Chiangrai City (loan)		
2021–2023	→ Chiangrai City (loan)	13	(0)
- * Club domestic league appearances and goals as of 2 September 2022

Sarawut Yodyinghathaikul (Thai: ศราวุฒิ ยอดยิ่งหทัยกุล, born March 6, 1999) is a Thai professional footballer who plays as a right-back.

== Honours ==
=== Club ===
Chiangrai United

- Thai FA Cup (1): 2020–21
