= 2020 Thailand Champions Cup =

Omsin Thailand Champions Cup
- Event: Thailand Champions Cup
Chiangrai United	Port
2	0
- Date: 2 February 2020
- Venue: SCG Stadium, Nonthaburi
- Man of the Match: Bill
- Referee: Torpong Somsing (Thailand)
- Attendance: 6,044
- Weather: Fog; 30 °C (86 °F) humidity 72%

The 2020 Thailand Champions Cup was the 4th Thailand Champions Cup, an annual football match contested by the winners of the previous season's Thai League 1 and Thai FA Cup competitions. It was sponsored by Government Savings Bank (Omsin Bank), and known as the Omsin Thailand Champions Cup (Thai: ออมสิน ไทยแลนด์แชมเปียนส์คัพ) for sponsorship purposes. The match was played at SCG Stadium, Nonthaburi and contested by 2019 Thai League 1 champions Chiangrai United, and Port as the champions of the 2019 Thai FA Cup.

== Qualified teams ==
Team	Qualification	Qualified date	Participation
Chiangrai United	Winners of the 2019 Thai League 1	26 October 2019	3rd
Port	Winners of the 2019 Thai FA Cup	2 November 2019	1st

== Match ==
=== Details ===
2 February 2020
19:00 UTC+7

Chiangrai United	2 – 0	Port
Lee Yong-rae 51'; Chaiyawat 55'	Report; News; Highlight; Full match

SCG Stadium, Nonthaburi
Attendance: 6,044
Referee: Torpong Somsing (Thailand)

Chiangrai United	Port

Lineups:
GK	22	(Thailand) Apirak Woravong
DF	5	(Brazil) Brinner
DF	13	(Thailand) Chotipat Poomkeaw		(yellow card) 66'	(substituted off) 65'
DF	30	(Thailand) Suriya Singmui
DF	33	(Thailand) Sarawut Inpaen		(yellow card) 82'
DF	36	(Thailand) Shinnaphat Leeaoh			(substituted off) 86'
MF	6	(Thailand) Phitiwat Sukjitthammakul (c)
MF	8	(South Korea) Lee Yong-rae	51'	(yellow card) 33'
MF	10	(Thailand) Sivakorn Tiatrakul		(yellow card) 90'
MF	26	(Thailand) Chaiyawat Buran	55'		(substituted off) 72'
FW	9	(Brazil) Bill
Substitutes:
GK	1	(Thailand) Saranon Anuin
DF	3	(Thailand) Tanasak Srisai			(substituted on) 86'
DF	4	(Thailand) Piyaphon Phanichakul
MF	14	(Thailand) Sanukran Thinjom		(yellow card) 90+3'	(substituted on) 72'
MF	17	(Thailand) Somkid Chamnarnsilp
MF	18	(Thailand) Thirayu Banhan
MF	27	(Thailand) Gionata Verzura
FW	11	(Brazil) Mailson
FW	16	(Thailand) Akarawin Sawasdee			(substituted on) 65'
Head Coach:
(Japan) Masami Taki

Lineups:
GK	36	(Thailand) Worawut Srisupha
DF	4	(Thailand) Elias Dolah	(yellow card) 45+1'
DF	15	(Philippines) Martin Steuble
DF	22	(Spain) David Rochela (c)	(yellow card) 20'
DF	34	(Thailand) Nitipong Selanon
MF	7	(Thailand) Pakorn Prempak		(substituted off) 61'
MF	8	(South Korea) Go Seul-ki
MF	16	(Thailand) Siwakorn Jakkuprasat		(substituted off) 74'
FW	5	(Spain) Sergio Suárez	(yellow card) 32'
FW	9	(Thailand) Adisak Kraisorn		(substituted off) 46'
FW	37	(Brazil) Heberty	(yellow card) 82'
Substitutes:
GK	18	(Thailand) Rattanai Songsangchan
DF	6	(Thailand) Todsapol Lated
DF	35	(Thailand) Athibordee Atirat
DF	81	(Thailand) Jaturapat Sattham
MF	10	(Thailand) Bordin Phala		(substituted on) 61'
MF	11	(Thailand) Tanasith Siripala		(substituted on) 46'
MF	31	(Thailand) Kanarin Thawornsak
MF	69	(Thailand) Sansern Limwattana
FW	39	(Thailand) Chenrop Samphaodi		(substituted on) 74'
Head Coach:
(Thailand) Choketawee Promrut

Assistant referees:
(Thailand) Pattarapong Kidsatid
(Thailand) Thanat Chucheun
Fourth official:
(Thailand) Wiwat Jampa-on
Assistant VAR:
(Thailand) Sivakorn Pu-udom
(Thailand) Rawut Nakrit

MATCH RULES

- 90 minutes.
- Penalty shoot-out if necessary.
- Maximum of three substitutions.

== Winner ==
2020 Thailand Champions Cup
winners

Second title

== See also ==
- 2020–21 Thai League 1
- 2020–21 Thai League 2
- 2020–21 Thai League 3
- 2020–21 Thai FA Cup
- 2020 Thai League Cup
