= Kohei Kato =

Japanese footballer

Personal information
- Full name: Kohei Kato
- Date of birth: 14 June 1989 (age 37)
- Place of birth: Wakayama, Japan
- Height: 1.73 m (5 ft 8 in)
- Position: Midfielder

Youth career
- 2005–2007: JEF United Chiba

College career
Years	Team	Apps	(Gls)
2008–2011	Ritsumeikan University		

Senior career*
Years	Team	Apps	(Gls)
2012	Sacachispas	0	(0)
2012	Machida Zelvia	29	(0)
2013–2015	Rudar Pljevlja	61	(8)
2015–2016	Podbeskidzie	35	(1)
2016–2018	Beroe	39	(1)
2018	Sagan Tosu	1	(0)
2019	Widzew Łódź	11	(0)
2019–2020	St Joseph's	6	(0)
2020–2021	Iskra Danilovgrad	25	(1)
2021	→ Podgorica (loan)	14	(1)
2021	Anadia FC	0	(0)
2021–2022	Chiangrai United	15	(1)
2022–2023	FC Ryukyu	8	(0)
2023	FK Jezero	15	(0)
2023	MUST CPK	6	(0)
2025	Kirivong Sok Sen Chey	11	(0)
- * Club domestic league appearances and goals as of 12 May 2025

Kohei Kato (加藤 恒平, Katō Kōhei; born 14 June 1989) is a Japanese professional footballer who plays as a midfielder.

== Career ==
After playing in the youth team of JEF United Chiba and in Ritsumeikan University, Kato opted for a career of a globetrotter. After spells with Sacachispas and FC Machida Zelvia in the 2012 J.League Division 2, he played two seasons with FK Rudar Pljevlja in the Montenegrin First League. Next he played with Polish side Podbeskidzie Bielsko-Biała in the 2015–16 Ekstraklasa, before joining Beroe Stara Zagora playing in the Bulgarian First League. In March 2019 Kato became part of the ranks of Polish club Widzew Łódź. In October 2019, he signed for Gibraltar National League side St Joseph's.

== International career ==
On 26 May 2017, Kato received his first call up for Japan for the friendly game against Syria and a 2018 FIFA World Cup qualification match against Iraq.

== Honours ==
Rudar Pljevlja

- Montenegrin First League: 2014–15
