= Park Jin-seong =

South Korean footballer (born 2001)

- Park with Gimcheon Sangmu in 2026

Personal information
- Date of birth: 15 May 2001 (age 25)
- Place of birth: South Korea
- Height: 1.78 m (5 ft 10 in)
- Position: Defender

Team information
- Current team: Gimcheon Sangmu
- Number: 33

Youth career
- 2012–2013: Iri Dong Elementary School
- 2014–2019: Jeonbuk Hyundai Motors
- 2020: Yonsei University

Senior career*
Years	Team	Apps	(Gls)
2021–2023	Jeonbuk Hyundai Motors	23	(0)
2023	→ Chungbuk Cheongju (loan)	26	(0)
2024–	Daejeon Hana Citizen	18	(0)
2025–	→ Gimcheon Sangmu (army)	8	(0)

International career^{‡}
2019	South Korea U18	3	(0)
- * Club domestic league appearances and goals as of 4 August 2026 ‡ National team caps and goals as of 14:18, 8 July 2021 (UTC)

- Park Jin-seong
- Hangul: 박진성
- RR: Bak Jinseong
- MR: Pak Chinsŏng

Park Jin-seong (Korean: 박진성; born 15 May 2001) is a South Korean footballer currently playing as a left-back for Gimcheon Sangmu.

== Career statistics ==
=== Club ===
As of 20 February 2022.

Club	Season	League			Cup		Continental		Other		Total	
Club	Season	Division	Apps	Goals	Apps	Goals	Apps	Goals	Apps	Goals	Apps	Goals
Jeonbuk Hyundai Motors	2021	K League 1	11	0	0	0	5 (Note: Appearances in the AFC Champions League)	1	0	0	16	1
Jeonbuk Hyundai Motors	2022	K League 1	0	0	0	0	0	0	0	0	0	0
Career total			11	0	0	0	5	1	0	0	16	1
