= Nattawut Jaroenboot =

Thai footballer (born 1991)

Personal information
- Full name: Nattawut Jaroenboot
- Date of birth: 27 April 1991 (age 35)
- Place of birth: Yasothon, Thailand
- Height: 1.75 m (5 ft 9 in)
- Position: Midfielder

Team information
- Current team: PT Satun
- Number: 21

Senior career*
| Years | Team | Apps | (Gls) |
| 2014–2017 | Krabi | | |
| 2014 | → Satun United (loan) | | |
| 2018 | Ubon UMT United | 32 | (1) |
| 2019–2023 | Sukhothai | 82 | (1) |
| 2021 | → Chiangrai United (loan) | 3 | (0) |
| 2023–2026 | Nakhon Ratchasima | 83 | (2) |
| 2026– | PT Satun | 0 | (0) |
- * Club domestic league appearances and goals

Nattawut Jaroenboot (Thai: ณัฐวุฒิ เจริญบุตร; born 27 April 1991) is a Thai professional footballer who plays as a midfielder for Thai League 2 club PT Satun

== Honours ==
Sukhothai

- Thai League 2 Runners-up: 2021–22

Nakhon Ratchasima

- Thai League 2: 2023–24
