= Thirayu Banhan =

Thai footballer (born 1994)

Personal information
- Full name: Thirayu Banhan
- Date of birth: 19 February 1994 (age 32)
- Place of birth: Nakhon Phanom, Thailand
- Height: 1.68 m (5 ft 6 in)
- Positions: Attacking midfielder; winger

Team information
- Current team: North Bangkok University
- Number: 10

Youth career
- 2010–2013: Patumkongka School

Senior career*
Years	Team	Apps	(Gls)
2013–2015	Ubon UMT United		
2015–2018	Ubon Ratchathani		
2018	Khon Kaen		
2019	PTT Rayong	18	(0)
2020–2022	Chiangrai United	8	(0)
2021–2022	→ PT Prachuap (loan)	27	(0)
2022–2023	PT Prachuap	5	(0)
2023–2024	Chanthaburi	11	(0)
2024	Sukhothai	2	(0)
2025–	North Bangkok University	42	(2)
- * Club domestic league appearances and goals as of 10 May 2026

Thirayu Banhan (Thai: ถิรายุ บรรหาร, born 19 February 1994) is a Thai professional footballer who plays as an attacking midfielder or a winger.

== Honours ==
Chiangrai United

- Thai FA Cup (1): 2020–21
- Thailand Champions Cup (1): 2020
