= Ratthanakorn Maikami =

Thai footballer (born 1998)

Personal information
- Full name: Ratthanakorn Maikami
- Date of birth: 7 January 1998 (age 28)
- Place of birth: Buriram, Thailand
- Height: 1.75 m (5 ft 9 in)
- Positions: Defensive midfielder; right back

Team information
- Current team: Uthai Thani

Youth career
- 2011–2015: Buriram United

Senior career*
| Years | Team | Apps | (Gls) |
| 2016–2026 | Buriram United | 207 | (10) |
| 2026– | Uthai Thani | 0 | (0) |

International career
| 2018 | Thailand U21 | 3 | (0) |
| 2017–2019 | Thailand U23 | 16 | (0) |
Medal record
Thailand under-23
Sea Games
| Gold medal – first place | Sea Games 2017 | Football |
- * Club domestic league appearances and goals as of 1 May 2026

Ratthanakorn Maikami (Thai: รัตนากร ใหม่คามิ; born 7 January 1998) is a Thai professional footballer who plays as a defensive midfielder or a right back for Thai League 1 club Uthai Thani.

== International career ==
In August 2017, he won the Football at the 2017 Southeast Asian Games with Thailand U23.

== Honours ==
=== Club ===
Buriram United

- Thai League 1 (6): 2017, 2018, 2021–22, 2022–23, 2023–24, 2024–25
- Thai FA Cup (3): 2021–22, 2022–23, 2024–25
- Thai League Cup (3): 2021–22, 2022–23, 2024–25
- Thailand Champions Cup: 2019
- ASEAN Club Championship: 2024–25
- Mekong Club Championship: 2016

=== International ===
Thailand U-23

- SEA Games Gold Medal: 2017
