= Cho Ji-hun =

South Korean footballer (born 1990)

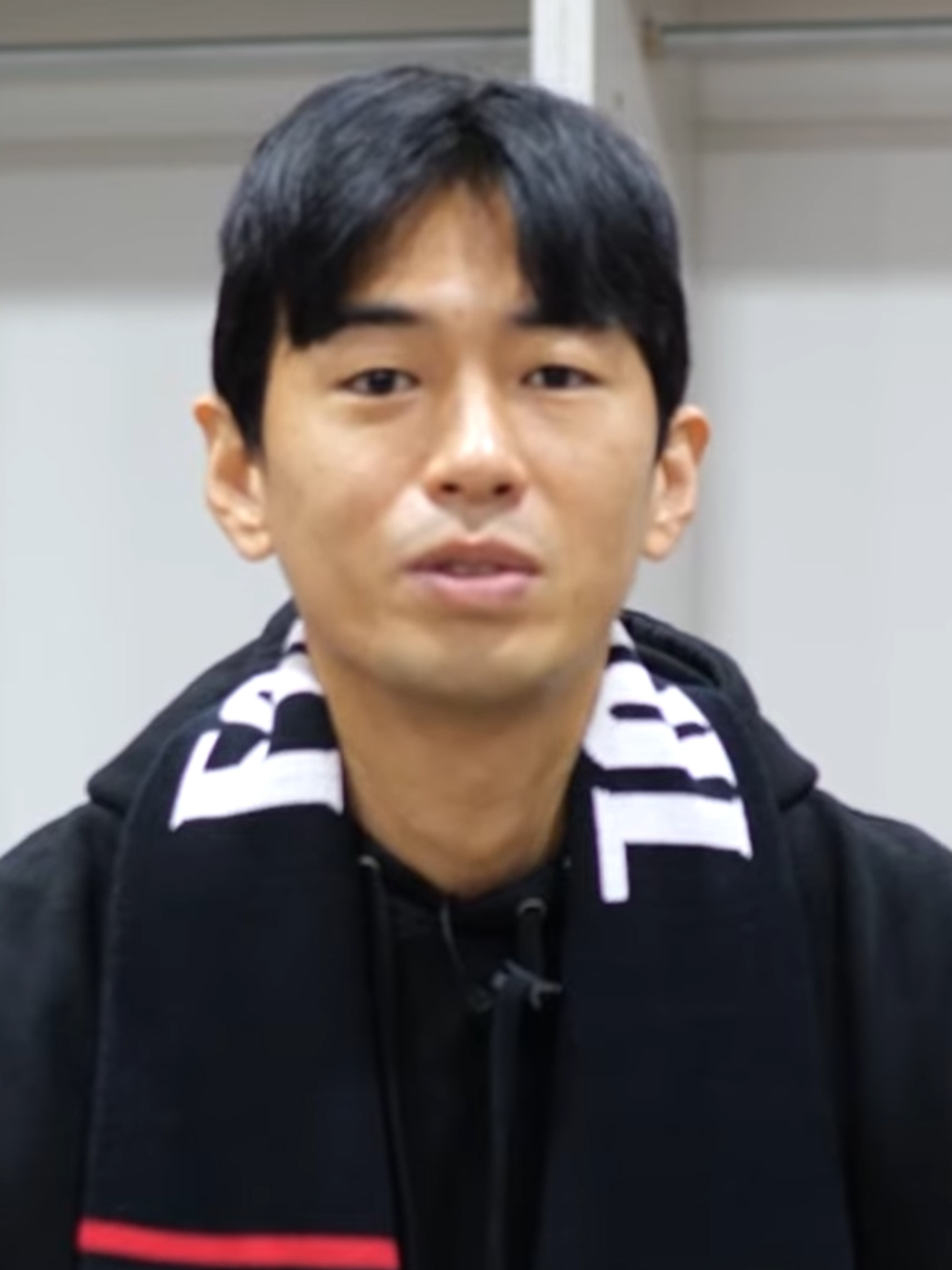
- Cho with FC Seoul, January 2022

Personal information
- Date of birth: 29 May 1990 (age 36)
- Place of birth: South Korea
- Height: 1.88 m (6 ft 2 in)
- Position: Midfielder

Team information
- Current team: Ansan Greeners FC
- Number: 25

Youth career
- 2009–2010: Yonsei University

Senior career*
Years	Team	Apps	(Gls)
2011–2018	Suwon Samsung Bluewings	61	(1)
2016–2017	→ Sangju Sangmu (army)	18	(0)
2019–2020	Gangwon FC	23	(0)
2021	Chiangrai United	24	(1)
2022	FC Seoul	5	(0)
2023–2024	Jeonnam Dragons	59	(3)
2025–	Ansan Greeners FC	52	(1)

International career
2008	Korea Republic U-19		
2009	Korea Republic Olympic		
2010	Korea Republic U-20		
- * Club domestic league appearances and goals as of 6 August 2026

- Cho Ji-hun
- Hangul: 조지훈
- Hanja: 趙志焄
- RR: Jo Jihun
- MR: Cho Chihun

Cho Ji-hun (Korean: 조지훈; born 29 May 1990) is a South Korean football midfielder for Ansan Greeners FC.

== Career statistics ==
As of match played 2 March 2025

Appearances and goals by club, season and competition
Club	Season	League			National cup		League Cup		Continental		Other		Total	
Club	Season	Division	Apps	Goals	Apps	Goals	Apps	Goals	Apps	Goals	Apps	Goals	Apps	Goals
Suwon Samsung Bluewings	2011	K League 1	1	0	1	0	0	0	1	0	—		3	0
Suwon Samsung Bluewings	2012	K League 1	11	0	0	0	—		—		—		11	0
Suwon Samsung Bluewings	2013	K League 1	20	1	1	0	—		5	0	—		26	1
Suwon Samsung Bluewings	2014	K League 1	16	0	1	0	—		—		—		17	0
Suwon Samsung Bluewings	2015	K League 1	4	0	1	0	—		4	0	—		9	0
Suwon Samsung Bluewings	2017	K League 1	3	0	0	0	—		—		—		3	0
Suwon Samsung Bluewings	2018	K League 1	6	0	2	1	—		3	0	—		11	1
Suwon Samsung Bluewings	Total		61	1	6	1	—		13	0	—		80	2
Sangju Sangmu (army)	2016	K League 1	10	0	1	0	—		—		—		11	0
Sangju Sangmu (army)	2017	K League 1	8	0	0	0	—		—		—		8	0
Sangju Sangmu (army)	Total		18	0	1	0	—		—		—		19	0
Gangwon FC	2019	K League 1	15	0	2	0	—		—		—		17	0
Gangwon FC	2020	K League 1	8	0	3	0	—		—		—		11	0
Gangwon FC	Total		23	0	5	0	—		—		—		28	0
Chiangrai United	2020–21	Thai League 1	16	1	5	0	—		5	0	1	0	27	1
Chiangrai United	2021–22	Thai League 1	8	0	2	1	0	0	—		—		10	1
Chiangrai United	Total		24	1	7	1	0	0	5	0	1	0	37	2
FC Seoul	2022	K League 1	5	0	3	0	—		—		—		8	0
Jeonnam Dragons	2023	K League 2	25	0	2	0	—		—		—		27	0
Jeonnam Dragons	2024	K League 2	34	3	1	0	—		—		1	0	36	3
Ansan Greeners FC	2025	K League 2	2	0	0	0	—		—		—		2	0
Ansan Greeners FC	Total		66	3	6	0	—		—		1	0	73	3
Career total			192	5	25	2	0	0	18	0	2	0	237	7

== Honours ==
=== Club ===
Chiangrai United

- Thai FA Cup (1): 2020–21
