= Chotipat Poomkaew =

Thai footballer (born 1998)

Personal information
- Full name: Chotipat Poomkaew
- Date of birth: 28 May 1998 (age 28)
- Place of birth: Nakhon Sawan, Thailand
- Height: 1.70 m (5 ft 7 in)
- Position: Winger

Team information
- Current team: Ratchaburi
- Number: 88

Youth career
- 2012–2014: Chiangrai United

Senior career*
Years	Team	Apps	(Gls)
2015–2023	Chiangrai United	87	(11)
2017	→ Chiangrai City (loan)	16	(1)
2018	→ Chiangmai (loan)	20	(0)
2019	→ Chiangmai (loan)	23	(3)
2023–	Ratchaburi	36	(6)

International career^{‡}
2015–2016	Thailand U19	9	(2)
2019	Thailand U23	2	(0)
- * Club domestic league appearances and goals as of 9 January 2026 ‡ National team caps and goals as of 26 March 2019

Chotipat Poomkaew (Thai: โชติภัทร พุ่มแก้ว, born May 28, 1998) is a Thai professional footballer who plays as a winger for Thai League 1 club Ratchaburi.

== Honours ==
=== Club ===
Chiangrai United

- Thai FA Cup: 2020–21
- Thailand Champions Cup: 2020

=== International ===
Thailand U-19

- AFF U-19 Youth Championship: 2015
