= Somkid Chamnarnsilp =

Thai footballer

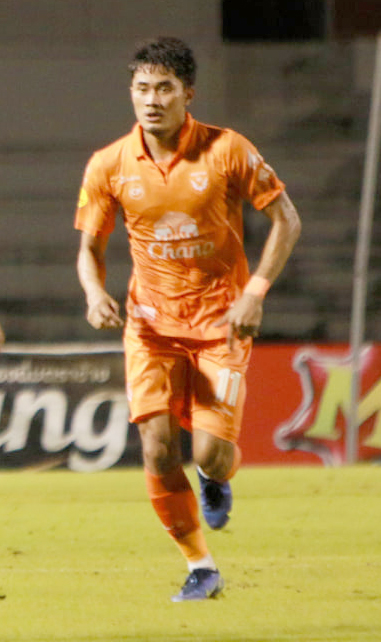
- Somkid Chamnarnsilp playing for Sukhothai.

Personal information
- Full name: Somkid Chamnarnsilp
- Date of birth: 7 January 1993 (age 33)
- Place of birth: Krabi, Thailand
- Height: 1.70 m (5 ft 7 in)
- Position: Forward

Team information
- Current team: Chanthaburi
- Number: 23

Youth career
- 2009: Krabi

Senior career*
Years	Team	Apps	(Gls)
2010–2018	Krabi	45	(4)
2019	Chiangmai	0	(0)
2019	→ Chiangrai United (loan)	19	(1)
2020–2022	Chiangrai United	28	(3)
2021–2022	→ Sukhothai (loan)	17	(5)
2022–2024	Sukhothai	46	(2)
2024–	Chanthaburi	25	(1)

International career
2016	Thailand U23	0	(0)
- * Club domestic league appearances and goals

Somkid Chamnarnsilp (Thai: สมคิด ชำนาญศิลป์, born January 7, 1993), simply known as Heem (Thai: ฮีม) is a Thai footballer who plays as a forward.

== International career ==
In 2016, Somkid has called to practiced with Thailand U-23 national football team but he has not been the last 23 players to competed in the 2016 AFC U-23 Championship in Qatar.

== Honours ==
=== Club ===
Chiangrai United

- Thai League 1 (1): 2019
- Thai FA Cup (1): 2020–21
- Thailand Champions Cup (1): 2020
