= Gionata Verzura =

Thai footballer (born 1992)

Personal information
- Full name: Gionata Verzura
- Date of birth: 27 May 1992 (age 34)
- Place of birth: Bangkok, Thailand
- Height: 1.75 m (5 ft 9 in)
- Positions: Defensive midfielder; right back

Team information
- Current team: Chiangrai United
- Number: 17

Youth career
- 2004–2009: Pensmith School

Senior career*
Years	Team	Apps	(Gls)
2010–2016	Osotspa Samut Prakan	11	(0)
2011	→ Sa Kaeo (loan)	9	(0)
2014	→ Phuket (loan)	0	(0)
2015	→ Hua Hin City (loan)	12	(0)
2016	→ Ubon UMT United (loan)	24	(1)
2017	Ubon UMT United	30	(0)
2018	Ratchaburi Mitr Phol	19	(0)
2019–	Chiangrai United	116	(2)
2019	→ Chiangmai (loan)	26	(0)
- * Club domestic league appearances and goals as of 9 January 2026

Gionata Verzura (Thai: จอนาตา แวร์ซูร่า, born 27 May 1992) is a Thai professional footballer who plays as a defensive midfielder or a right back for Thai League 1 club Chiangrai United.

== Personal life ==
Gionata was born in Bangkok. His father is Italian and his mother is Thai. Gionata's twin older brother Antonio is also a footballer.

== Honours ==
=== Club ===
Chiangrai United

- Thai FA Cup (1): 2020–21
- Thailand Champions Cup (1): 2020
