= Wasan Homsan =

Thai footballer

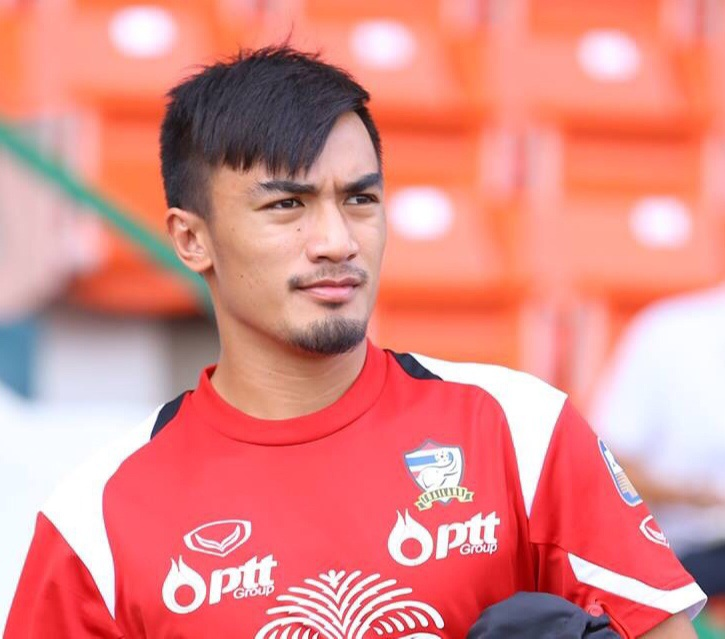

Personal information
- Full name: Wasan Homsan
- Date of birth: 2 August 1991 (age 35)
- Place of birth: Sakon Nakhon, Thailand
- Height: 1.73 m (5 ft 8 in)
- Position: Right back

Youth career
- 2006–2008: Assumption Sriracha School

Senior career*
Years	Team	Apps	(Gls)
2009–2015	Bangkok Glass	79	(2)
2016–2020	Suphanburi	114	(1)
2021–2022	Chiangrai United	41	(0)
2022–2023	Nakhon Ratchasima	24	(0)
2023	Suphanburi	16	(0)
2024–2026	Khon Kaen United	56	(0)

International career
2013	Thailand U23	2	(0)
2013–2014	Thailand	5	(0)
- * Club domestic league appearances and goals as of 8 October 2024

Wasan Homsan (Thai: วสันต์ ฮมแสน, born August 2, 1991), simply known as Ping (Thai: ปิง), is a Thai professional footballer who plays as a right back.

== International career ==
In 2013 Wasan was called up to the national team by Surachai Jaturapattarapong to the 2015 AFC Asian Cup qualification. In October, 2013 he debut for Thailand in a friendly match against Bahrain. In October 15, 2013 he played against Iran in the 2015 AFC Asian Cup qualification. He represented Thailand U23 in the 2014 Asian Games.

=== International ===
As of 12 November 2015

National team	Year	Apps	Goals
Thailand	2013	4	0
Thailand	2014	1	0
Thailand	Total	5	0

== Honours ==
=== Clubs ===
Bangkok Glass

- Thai FA Cup: 2014
- Queen's Cup: 2010
- Singapore Cup: 2010

Chiangrai United

- Thai FA Cup: 2020–21
