= Bill (footballer, born 1984) =

Brazilian footballer

Personal information
- Full name: Rosimar Amâncio
- Date of birth: July 2, 1984 (age 42)
- Place of birth: São Lourenço, Brazil
- Height: 1.83 m (6 ft 0 in)
- Position: Striker

Senior career*
Years	Team	Apps	(Gls)
2006	Bragantino		(1)
2007–2008	Adap Galo Maringá		
2008–2009	Bragantino	9	(7)
2008	→ Shanghai Shenxin (loan)	15	(3)
2009–2012	Corinthians	14	(2)
2010–2011	→ Coritiba (loan)	39	(12)
2012–2013	Santos	16	(1)
2013	Al-Ittihad	6	(2)
2013	Coritiba	13	(1)
2014	Ceará	31	(10)
2015	Botafogo	9	(2)
2015–2016	Busan IPark	4	(0)
2016	Ceará	32	(15)
2017	Figueirense	12	(1)
2017	Club América	32	(9)
2018	Ratchaburi Mitr Phol	16	(6)
2018–2023	Chiangrai United	85	(51)
2021–2022	→ Chiangmai United (loan)	14	(5)
2022	→ Chiangmai United (loan)	15	(3)
2023	→ Lamphun Warriors (loan)	8	(1)
- * Club domestic league appearances and goals as of 16 January 2024 (UTC)

Rosimar Amâncio (born 2 July 1984), better known as Bill, is a Brazilian footballer as a striker.

== Career ==
Bill began his career on Bragantino, and was loaned to China League One club Nanchang Hengyuan, in 2008.

After the loan, Bill returned to Brazil, and moved to Corinthians, in July 2009. However, due to a lack of first team football, he was loaned to Coritiba.

He then returned to Corinthians, but after another unsuccessful period at the club, he signed a two-year contract with Santos.

=== Career statistics ===
(Correct as of July 30, 2012)

Club	Season	State League		League		Copa do Brasil		Copa Libertadores		Copa Sudamericana		Total	
Club	Season	Apps	Goals	Apps	Goals	Apps	Goals	Apps	Goals	Apps	Goals	Apps	Goals
Bragantino	2009	13	3	9	7	0	0	0	0	0	0	24	10
Total		13	3	9	7	0	0	0	0	0	0	24	10
Corinthians	2009	—	—	13	2	—	—	—	—	—	—	13	2
Corinthians	2010	2	0	0	0	—	—	—	—	—	—	2	0
Corinthians	2012	2	0	0	0	0	0	0	0	0	0	2	0
Total		4	0	13	2	0	0	0	0	0	0	17	2
Coritiba (loan)	2010	—	—	8	1	3	0	—	—	—	—	11	1
Coritiba (loan)	2011	17	12	31	11	9	4	—	—	—	—	57	27
Total		17	12	39	12	12	4	0	0	0	0	68	28
Santos	2012	—	—	16	1	—	—	—	—	—	—	16	1
Total		0	0	16	1	0	0	0	0	0	0	16	1
Al-Ittihad	2012–13	—	—	6	2	—	—	—	—	—	—	6	2
Total		0	0	6	2	0	0	0	0	0	0	6	2

== Honours ==
Coritiba

- Campeonato Paranaense (2): 2010, 2011

Santos

- Recopa Sudamericana (1): 2012

Chiangrai United

- Thai League 1: 2019
- Thai FA Cup (2): 2018, 2020–21
- Thai League Cup: 2018
- Thailand Champions Cup: 2020
