= Chaiyawat Buran =

Thai footballer (born 1996)

Personal information
- Full name: Chaiyawat Buran
- Date of birth: 26 October 1996 (age 30)
- Place of birth: Nakhon Si Thammarat, Thailand
- Height: 1.77 m (5 ft 9 1/2 in)
- Positions: Left-back; winger

Team information
- Current team: Pattani

Youth career
- 2010–2013: Muangthong United

Senior career*
Years	Team	Apps	(Gls)
2014–2017	Muangthong United	9	(1)
2014	→ Nakhon Nayok (loan)	6	(1)
2015	→ Pattaya United (loan)	26	(8)
2017	→ Pattaya United (loan)	17	(0)
2017–2021	Chiangrai United	83	(7)
2021–2022	Samut Prakan City	26	(2)
2022–2024	Lamphun Warriors	47	(1)
2024–2026	Port	33	(1)
2026–	Pattani	0	(0)

International career^{‡}
2013–2014	Thailand U19	10	(4)
2016	Thailand U21	3	(0)
2016–2018	Thailand U23	21	(3)
2017–	Thailand	2	(0)
Medal record
Thailand under-23
Sea Games
Gold medal – first place	Sea Games 2017	Football
- * Club domestic league appearances and goals as of 01:05, 17 December 2025 (UTC) ‡ National team caps and goals as of 10 September 2024

Chaiyawat Buran (Thai: ชัยวัฒน์ บุราณ, born 26 October 1996) is a Thai professional footballer who plays as a left-back or a winger for Thai League 1 club Pattani and the Thailand national team.

== International goals ==
=== Under-23 ===
Chaiyawat Buran – goals for Thailand U23
No	Date	Venue	Opponent	Score	Result	Competition
1.	19 July 2017	Bangkok, Thailand	Mongolia	1–0	1–1	2018 AFC U-23 Championship qualification
2.	15 August 2017	Shah Alam, Malaysia	Indonesia	1–0	1–1	2017 Southeast Asian Games
3.	9 December 2017	Buriram, Thailand	Japan	2–1	2–1	2017 M-150 Cup

== Honours ==
=== Club ===
Muangthong United

- Thai League 1 (1): 2016
- Thai League Cup (1): 2016

Chiangrai United

- Thai League 1 (1): 2019
- Thai FA Cup (3): 2017, 2018, 2020–21
- Thailand Champions Cup (2): 2018, 2020
- Thai League Cup (1): 2018

Port

- Thai League Cup (1): 2025–26
- Piala Presiden (1): 2025

=== International ===
Thailand U-23

- Sea Games Gold Medal (1) : 2017
- Dubai Cup (1) : 2017

Thailand U-21

- Nations Cup (1) : 2016
