= Sarawut Inpaen =

Thai footballer

Personal information
- Full name: Sarawut Inpaen
- Date of birth: 3 March 1992 (age 34)
- Place of birth: Surin, Thailand
- Height: 1.80 m (5 ft 11 in)
- Positions: Centre back; left back

Youth career
- 2010: Suankularb Wittayalai School
- 2011: Buriram United

Senior career*
Years	Team	Apps	(Gls)
2011	Buriram United	1	(0)
2012–2017	Air Force Central	89	(2)
2015	→ Trat (loan)	15	(0)
2018–2022	Chiangrai United	103	(3)
2023–2025	Lamphun Warrior	31	(4)
2025	Khon Kaen	8	(1)
2025–2026	Nakhon Ratchasima	14	(0)
- * Club domestic league appearances and goals

Sarawut Inpaen (Thai: ศราวุธ อินทร์แป้น, born March 3, 1992) is a Thai footballer who plays as a centre back or a left back .

== Honours ==
=== Club ===
Chiangrai United

- Thai League 1: 2019
- Thai FA Cup: 2018, 2020–21
- Thai League Cup: 2018
- Thailand Champions Cup: 2018, 2020
