= Tanasak Srisai =

Thai footballer (born 1989)

Personal information
- Full name: Tanasak Srisai
- Date of birth: 25 September 1989 (age 37)
- Place of birth: Prachinburi, Thailand
- Height: 1.83 m (6 ft 0 in)
- Position: Centre-back

Team information
- Current team: Chiangrai United
- Number: 3

Youth career
- 2006: Patumkongka School

Senior career*
| Years | Team | Apps | (Gls) |
| 2007–2010 | Pluakdaeng Rayong United | 28 | (4) |
| 2011–2012 | TOT | 46 | (2) |
| 2013–2014 | Buriram United | 48 | (2) |
| 2015 | Police Tero | 7 | (0) |
| 2015 | Ubon UMT United | 12 | (2) |
| 2016 | Pattaya United | 28 | (1) |
| 2017 | Police Tero | 24 | (2) |
| 2018– | Chiangrai United | 152 | (2) |

International career
| 2008–2009 | Thailand U19 | | |
| 2012–2013 | Thailand | 1 | (0) |
- * Club domestic league appearances and goals as of 9 January 2026

Tanasak Srisai (Thai: ธนะศักดิ์ ศรีใส, born September 25, 1989), simply known as Bee (Thai: บี), is a Thai professional footballer who plays as a centre-back for Thai League 1 club Chiangrai United.

== Club career ==
Tanasak's form with TOT S.C. is impressive and is one of the main players on the team, therefore Buriram United bought him in 2013. At the start of the 2013 season he played well and became the starter of the team for a couple times. He scored his first Buriram goal against Chonburi FC in 2013.

== International career ==
He was called up by Winfried Schäfer to the 2012 King's Cup. On March 6, 2014, he debuted for Thailand against Lebanon in the 2015 AFC Asian Cup qualification.

=== International ===
As of 12 November 2015

| National team | Year | Apps | Goals |
|---|---|---|---|
| Thailand | 2014 | 1 | 0 |
| Thailand | Total | 1 | 0 |

== Honours ==
=== Club ===
Buriram United

- Thai League 1: 2013, 2014
- Thai FA Cup: 2013
- Thai League Cup: 2013
- Toyota Premier Cup: 2014
- Kor Royal Cup: 2013, 2014

Ubon UMT United

- Thai League 4: 2015

Chiangrai United

- Thai League 1: 2019
- Thai FA Cup: 2018, 2020–21
- Thai League Cup: 2018
- Thailand Champions Cup: 2018, 2020
