= Brinner =

Brazilian footballer (born 1987)

Personal information
- Full name: Brinner Henrique Santos Souza
- Date of birth: 16 July 1987 (age 39)
- Place of birth: Lavras, Brazil
- Height: 1.89 m (6 ft 2 in)
- Position: Centre-back

Team information
- Current team: Kasetsart
- Number: 5

Youth career
- Fabril

Senior career*
Years	Team	Apps	(Gls)
2006	Fabril		
2007	Tupynambás		
2007–2008	São Raimundo		
2008	Tupi		
2009	Lavras		
2009	Bacabal		
2010–2011	Cianorte		
2011	Paraná	25	(2)
2012–2014	Botafogo	15	(0)
2013	→ Bahia (loan)	0	(0)
2013–2014	→ Paraná (loan)	35	(0)
2014	→ Portuguesa (loan)	21	(0)
2015	Macaé Esporte	18	(1)
2016	Oeste	0	(0)
2016	Remo	6	(1)
2016–2017	Bandırmaspor	31	(1)
2017	Giresunspor	0	(0)
2018	Ubon UMT United	31	(1)
2019–2022	Chiangrai United	88	(6)
2022	Lampang	13	(0)
2023–2024	Uthai Thani	47	(5)
2024–	Kasetsart	0	(0)
- * Club domestic league appearances and goals as of 27 May 2024

Brinner Henrique Santos Souza (born 16 July 1987), simply known as Brinner, is a Brazilian professional footballer who plays for Kasetsart in Thai League 2 as a centre-back.

== Career ==
Born in Lavras, Minas Gerais, Brinner only played amateur football well into his 20s. In June 2011, he joined Paraná, and after appearing regularly for the side he moved to Botafogo in December, by agreeing to a four-year deal. In June 2016, he joined Bandırmaspor

After suffering an injury during the campaign, Brinner was loaned to Bahia in January 2013. However, he was deemed surplus to requirements and returned to Bota in April. Late in the month Brinner returned to his former club Paraná.

On 6 July 2014, Brinner joined Portuguesa also in a temporary deal. After appearing regularly he moved to Macaé Esporte, newly promoted to the second level, on 22 December.

== Career statistics ==
As of match played 26 May 2024

Appearances and goals by club, season and competition
Club	Season	League			State League		National cup		League cup		Continental		Other		Total	
Club	Season	Division	Apps	Goals	Apps	Goals	Apps	Goals	Apps	Goals	Apps	Goals	Apps	Goals	Apps	Goals
Paraná	2011	Série B	25	2	—		—		—		—		—		25	2
Botafogo	2012	Série A	15	0	4	0	2	0	—		1	0	—		22	0
Bahia (loan)	2013	Série A	—		1	0	0	0	—		—		1	0	2	0
Paraná (loan)	2013	Série B	32	0	—		—		—		—		—		32	0
Paraná (loan)	2014	Série B	3	0	10	1	4	0	—		—		—		17	1
Paraná (loan)	Total		35	0	10	1	4	0	—		—		—		49	1
Portuguesa (loan)	2014	Série B	21	0	—		—		—		—		—		21	0
Macaé Esporte	2015	Série B	18	1	13	0	—		—		—		—		31	1
Oeste	2016	Série B	—		15	0	—		—		—		—		15	0
Remo	2016	Série C	6	1	—		—		—		—		—		6	1
Bandırmaspor	2016–17	1. Lig	31	1	—		2	1	—		—		—		33	2
Giresunspor	2017–18	1. Lig	0	0	—		4	0	—		—		—		4	0
Ubon UMT United	2018	Thai League 1	31	1	—		0	0	3	0	—		—		34	1
Chiangrai United	2019	Thai League 1	30	2	—		4	0	2	1	2	0	1	1	39	4
Chiangrai United	2020–21	Thai League 1	28	3	—		5	0	—		11	0	1	0	45	3
Chiangrai United	2021–22	Thai League 1	30	1	—		2	0	3	0	4	0	—		39	1
Chiangrai United	Total		88	6	—		11	0	5	1	17	0	2	1	123	8
Lampang	2022–23	Thai League 1	13	0	—		1	0	0	0	—		—		14	0
Uthai Thani	2022–23	Thai League 2	16	1	—		1	0	—		—		4	1	21	2
Uthai Thani	2023–24	Thai League 1	27	3	—		0	0	2	0	—		—		29	3
Uthai Thani	Total		43	4	—		1	0	2	0	—		4	1	50	5
Career total			326	16	43	1	25	1	10	1	18	0	7	2	429	21

== Honours ==
Chiangrai United

- Thai League 1: 2019
- Thai FA Cup: 2020–21
- Thailand Champions Cup: 2020

Individual

- Thai League 1 Player of the Month: August 2019
