= Akarawin Sawasdee =

Thai footballer

Personal information
- Full name: Akarawin Sawasdee
- Date of birth: 26 September 1990 (age 36)
- Place of birth: Chachoengsao, Thailand
- Height: 1.85 m (6 ft 1 in)
- Position: Striker

Team information
- Current team: Navy
- Number: 19

Youth career
- 2006–2008: Ratwinit Bangkaeo School

Senior career*
| Years | Team | Apps | (Gls) |
| 2009–2011 | Chachoengsao | 45 | (28) |
| 2012–2015 | Chonburi | 6 | (0) |
| 2013 | → Rayong (loan) | 19 | (4) |
| 2014–2015 | → Nakhon Ratchasima (loan) | 2 | (0) |
| 2016–2017 | BBCU | 22 | (3) |
| 2017–2023 | Chiangrai United | 112 | (23) |
| 2023–2024 | Chiangmai | 32 | (7) |
| 2024–2025 | Chiangmai United | 13 | (1) |
| 2025–2026 | Kasetsart | 16 | (8) |
| 2026– | Navy | 2 | (0) |
- * Club domestic league appearances and goals as of 5 March 2026

Akarawin Sawassdee (Thai; อัครวิน สวัสดี, born 26 September 1990), simply known as New (Thai: นิว), is a Thai professional footballer who plays as a striker for Thai League 3 club Navy . He got top goal scores and best striker awards in 2011 Thai Division 2 League Central & Eastern Region with Cha Choeng Sao.

== Honours ==
=== Club ===
Chiangrai United

- Thai League 1 (1): 2019
- Thai FA Cup (3): 2017, 2018, 2020–21
- Thailand Champions Cup (2): 2018, 2020
- Thai League Cup (1): 2018

=== Individual ===
- Regional League Eastern Division
  - Top Scorer (1) : 2011
