= Apirak Worawong =

Thai footballer

Personal information
- Full name: Apirak Worawong
- Date of birth: 7 January 1996 (age 30)
- Place of birth: Khon Kaen, Thailand
- Height: 1.76 m (5 ft 9 1/2 in)
- Position: Goalkeeper

Team information
- Current team: Chiangrai United
- Number: 1

Youth career
- 2013–2014: Chiangrai United

Senior career*
Years	Team	Apps	(Gls)
2014–	Chiangrai United	125	(0)
2014	→ Phetchaburi (loan)	19	(0)
2017	→ Army United (loan)	28	(0)
2018	→ Chiangmai (loan)	24	(0)

International career
2012–2013	Thailand U16	9	(0)
2014–2015	Thailand U19	4	(0)
2016	Thailand U21	3	(0)
2016–2018	Thailand U23	2	(0)
- * Club domestic league appearances and goals as of 9 January 2026

Apirak Worawong (Thai: อภิรักษ์ วรวงษ์; born 7 January 1996) is a Thai professional footballer who plays as a goalkeeper for Thai League 1 club Chiangrai United.

== Honours ==
=== International ===
Thailand U-21

- Nations Cup (1): 2016

=== Club ===
Chiangrai United

- Thai League 1 (1): 2019
- Thai FA Cup (1): 2020–21
- Thailand Champions Cup (1): 2020
