= Suriya Singmui =

Thai footballer (born 1995)

Personal information
- Full name: Suriya Singmui
- Date of birth: 7 April 1995 (age 31)
- Place of birth: Sadao, Songkhla, Thailand
- Height: 1.77 m (5 ft 10 in)
- Position: Left-back

Team information
- Current team: Lamphun Warriors
- Number: 30

Youth career
- 2007–2011: JMG Academy
- 2012: Muangthong United

Senior career*
Years	Team	Apps	(Gls)
2013–2016	Muangthong United	44	(0)
2013	→ Nakhon Nayok (loan)	22	(0)
2016	→ BEC Tero Sasana (loan)	26	(0)
2017–2024	Chiangrai United	168	(3)
2025–	Lamphun Warriors	7	(0)

International career^{‡}
2014–2018	Thailand U23	15	(0)
2014–2021	Thailand	5	(0)
Medal record
Thailand under-23
Sea Games
Gold medal – first place	Sea Games 2015	Football
Gold medal – first place	Sea Games 2017	Football
Thailand
Asean Football Championship
Winner	AFF Suzuki Cup 2020	2020
- * Club domestic league appearances and goals as of 20:56, 14 March 2025 (UTC) ‡ National team caps and goals as of 20:56, 9 June 2022 (UTC)

Suriya Singmui (Thai: สุริยา สิงห์มุ้ย, born 7 April 1995) is a Thai professional footballer who plays as a left-back for Thai League 1 club Lamphun Warriors and the Thailand national team.

== Club career ==
=== Muangthong United ===
Singmui played for JMG Academy and Muangthong United for six years.

=== Nakhon Nayok ===
Singmui went out on loan to Nakhon Nayok in March 2013, which was extended for the duration of the 2013–14 season in Thai Division 2. In all he made over 32 first team appearances for Nakhon Nayok.

=== Return to Muangthong United ===
Singmui played his first match in 2014 AFC Champions League qualifying play-off against Hà Nội T&T and won this match with a score of 2–0. Next round with a score of in a 2–1 his side loss against Melbourne Victory.

He debuts in 2014 Thai Premier League against Chainat Hornbill.

He was relianced by Scott Cooper to playing in 2014 Thai Premier League.

== International career ==
Singmui represented Thailand U23 in the 2014 Asian Games. Suriya won the 2015 Southeast Asian Games with Thailand U23. In 2016 Suriya was selected in Thailand U23 squad for 2016 AFC U-23 Championship in Qatar.

== Personal life ==
Suriya is one of the few Christian footballers in Thailand.

== Career statistics ==
As of 18 December 2021

National team	Year	Apps	Goals
Thailand	2014	2	0
Thailand	2017	2	0
Thailand	2021	1	0
Thailand	Total	5	0

== Honours ==
Chiangrai United

- Thai League 1 (1): 2019
- Thai FA Cup (3): 2017, 2018, 2020–21
- Thailand Champions Cup (2): 2018, 2020
- Thai League Cup (1): 2018

Thailand

- AFF Championship (1): 2020

Thailand U-23

- Sea Games
  - Gold Medal (2); 2015, 2017
- Nations Cup (1): 2016
- Dubai Cup (1): 2017
