= Sivakorn Tiatrakul =

Thai footballer

Personal information
- Full name: Sivakorn Tiatrakul
- Date of birth: 7 July 1994 (age 32)
- Place of birth: Saraburi, Thailand
- Height: 1.75 m (5 ft 9 in)
- Positions: Attacking midfielder; winger

Team information
- Current team: Port
- Number: 21

Youth career
- 2005–2008: Bangkok Christian College
- 2009–2012: Muangthong United

Senior career*
Years	Team	Apps	(Gls)
2013–2015	Muangthong United	11	(1)
2013	→ Nakhon Nayok (loan)	10	(0)
2013	→ Look Isan (loan)	13	(0)
2014	→ Customs United (loan)	22	(1)
2015	→ Pattaya United (loan)	15	(2)
2016	BEC Tero Sasana	28	(9)
2017–2024	Chiangrai United	181	(17)
2024–2025	BG Pathum United	13	(0)
2024–2025	→ PT Prachuap (loan)	11	(1)
2025–	Port	8	(0)

International career
2016–2021	Thailand	10	(0)
Medal record
Thailand
Asean Football Championship
Winner	AFF Suzuki Cup 2020	2020
- * Club domestic league appearances and goals as of 01:43, 25 December 2025 (UTC)

Sivakorn Tiatrakul (Thai: ศิวกรณ์ เตียตระกูล, born 7 July 1994) is a Thai professional footballer who plays as an attacking midfielder or as a winger for Thai League 1 club Port and the Thailand national team.

== International career ==
In March, 2016 Sivakorn was called up in a friendly match against South Korea, but did not make an appearance.

In 2021 he was called up by Thailand national team for the 2020 AFF Championship.

=== International ===
As of 18 December 2021

National team	Year	Apps	Goals
Thailand	2016	0	0
Thailand	2019	7	0
Thailand	2021	3	0
Thailand	Total	10	0

== Honours ==
=== Clubs ===
Look Isan

- Regional League Eastern Division: 2013

Chiangrai United

- Thai League 1: 2019
- Thai FA Cup (3): 2017, 2018, 2020–21
- Thailand Champions Cup (2): 2018, 2020
- Thai League Cup: 2018

Port

- Thai League Cup: 2025–26

=== International ===
Thailand

- AFF Championship: 2020
