= Phitiwat Sukjitthammakul =

Thai footballer

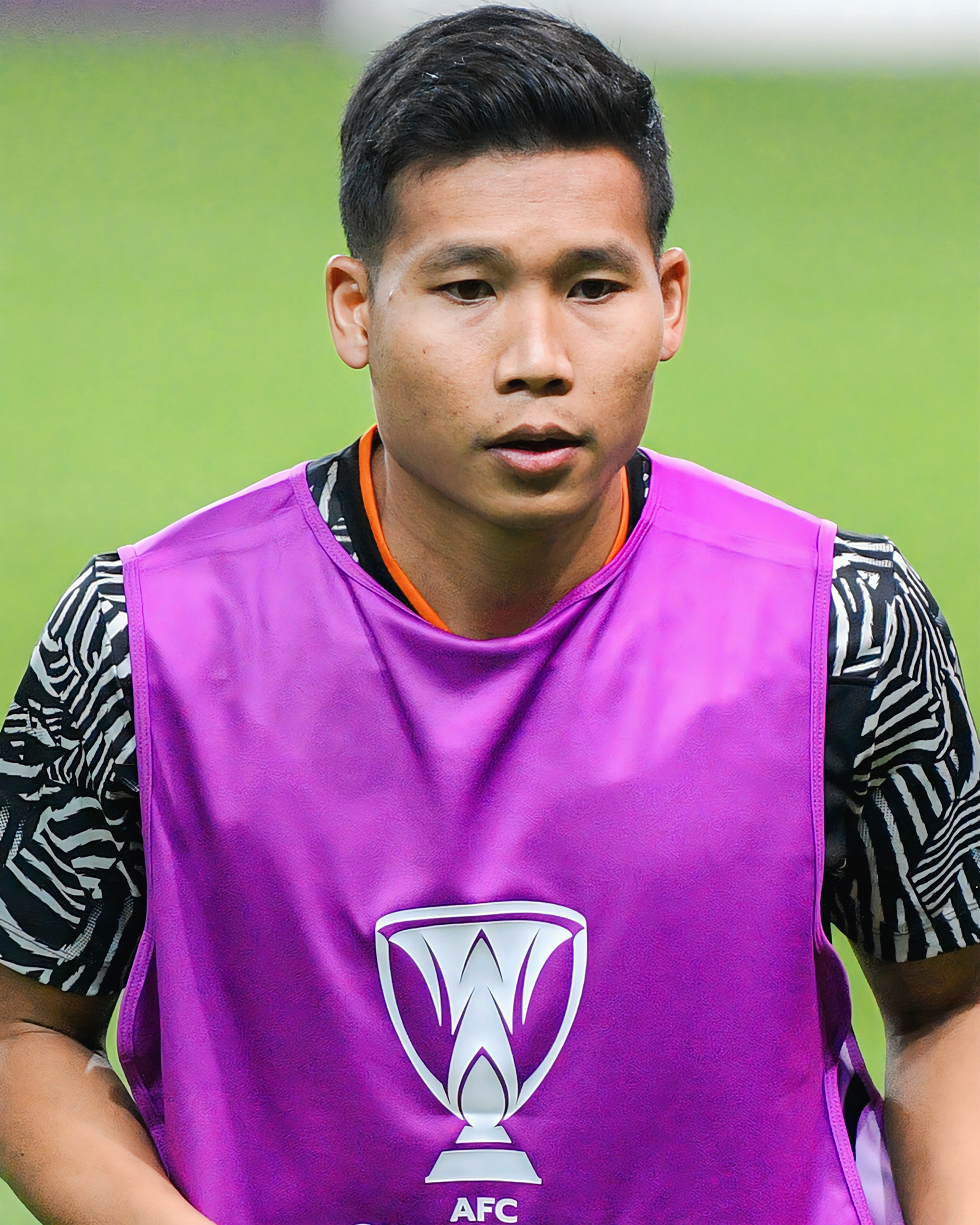
- Sukjitthammakul in 2025

Personal information
- Full name: Phitiwat Sukjitthammakul
- Date of birth: 1 February 1995 (age 31)
- Place of birth: Rayong, Thailand
- Height: 1.73 m (5 ft 8 in)
- Positions: Defensive midfielder; left-back

Team information
- Current team: Buriram United
- Number: 27

Youth career
- 2007–2011: JMG Academy
- 2012–2013: Muangthong United

Senior career*
Years	Team	Apps	(Gls)
2013–2015	Muangthong United	3	(0)
2013	→ Nonthaburi (loan)	7	(0)
2013	→ Nakhon Nayok (loan)	11	(0)
2016	BEC Tero Sasana	25	(2)
2017–2022	Chiangrai United	144	(9)
2022–2024	BG Pathum United	48	(1)
2024–	Buriram United	40	(2)

International career^{‡}
2013–2014	Thailand U19	12	(1)
2016–2018	Thailand U23	15	(2)
2019–	Thailand	26	(0)
Medal record
Thailand under-23
Sea Games
Gold medal – first place	Sea Games 2017	Football
Thailand
Asean Football Championship
Winner	AFF Suzuki Cup 2020	2020
- * Club domestic league appearances and goals as of 03:48, 2 May 2024 (UTC) ‡ National team caps and goals as of 4 June 2025

Phitiwat Sukjitthammakul (Thai: พิธิวัตต์ สุขจิตธรรมกุล, born 1 February 1995) is a Thai professional footballer who plays as a defensive midfielder or a left-back for Thai League 1 club Buriram United and the Thailand national team.

== Career statistics ==
=== International ===
As of 4 June 2025

National team	Year	Apps	Goals
Thailand	2019	6	0
Thailand	2021	8	0
Thailand	2022	7	0
Thailand	2023	3	0
Thailand	2024	1	0
Thailand	2025	1	0
Thailand	Total	26	0

== Honours ==
=== Club ===
Chiangrai United

- Thai League 1: 2019
- Thai FA Cup (3): 2017, 2018, 2020–21
- Thai League Cup: 2018
- Thailand Champions Cup (2): 2018, 2020

BG Pathum United

- Thailand Champions Cup: 2022
- Thai League Cup: 2023–24

Buriram United

- Thai League 1: 2024–25
- Thai FA Cup: 2024–25
- Thai League Cup: 2024–25
- ASEAN Club Championship: 2024–25

=== International ===
Thailand U-23

- Sea Games Gold Medal: 2017
- Dubai Cup: 2017

Thailand

- AFF Championship: 2020

=== Individual ===
- Thai League 1 Player of the Month: October 2019
- Thai League 1 Player of the Year: 2019
- 2020 AFF Championship: Team of the Tournament
