= Shinnaphat Leeaoh =

Thai footballer (born 1997)

Personal information
- Full name: Shinnaphat Leeaoh
- Date of birth: 2 February 1997 (age 29)
- Place of birth: Nakhon Pathom, Thailand
- Height: 1.81 m (5 ft 11 1/2 in)
- Position: Centre back

Team information
- Current team: Buriram United
- Number: 75

Youth career
- 2008–2013: Assumption College Thonburi

Senior career*
Years	Team	Apps	(Gls)
2013–2016	Muangthong United	0	(0)
2013–2015	→ Assumption United (loan)	21	(0)
2016	→ Pattaya United (loan)	2	(0)
2017–2023	Chiangrai United	151	(6)
2023–2025	BG Pathum United	32	(3)
2025	→ Ratchaburi (loan)	13	(0)
2025–	Buriram United	12	(0)

International career^{‡}
2011–2012	Thailand U16	10	(1)
2014–2016	Thailand U19	8	(3)
2016–2018	Thailand U21	5	(0)
2017–2020	Thailand U23	27	(2)
2018–	Thailand	3	(0)
Medal record
Thailand under-23
Sea Games
Gold medal – first place	Sea Games 2017	Football
- * Club domestic league appearances and goals as of 13 April 2026 ‡ National team caps and goals as of 4 June 2025

Shinnaphat Leeaoh (Thai: ชินภัทร ลีเอาะ, born 2 February 1997) is a Thai professional footballer who plays as a centre back for Thai League 1 club Buriram United and the Thailand national team.

== International career ==
In March 2018, Shinnaphat was in the squad of Thailand for 2018 King's Cup, but did not make an appearance. On 21 March 2025, he make his first cap for the national team in a friendly match against Afghanistan.

== Honours ==
=== Club ===
Chiangrai United

- Thai League 1: 2019
- Thai FA Cup: 2017, 2018, 2020–21
- Thailand Champions Cup: 2018, 2020
- Thai League Cup: 2018

BG Pathum United

- Thai League Cup: 2023–24

Buriram United

- Thai League 1: 2025–26

=== International ===
Thailand U-23

- Sea Games Gold Medal: 2017
- Dubai Cup: 2017

Thailand U-21

- Nations Cup: 2016
