= 2021–22 Samut Prakan City F.C. season =

Samut Prakan City
2021–22 season
- Chairman: Chonsawat Asavahame
- Manager: Masatada Ishii (until 27 November 2021); Yasushi Yoshida (from 11 December 2021)
- Stadium: Samut Prakarn SAT Stadium, Bang Phli, Samut Prakan, Thailand
- Thai League T1: -
- Thai FA Cup: -
- Thai League Cup: -
- Top goalscorer: League: Daisuke Sakai (4); All: 2 players (5)
Home colours	Away colours	Third colours

The 2021–22 season is Samut Prakan City's 3rd consecutive seasons in top flight after the owner decided to change the club's name from Pattaya United to Samut Prakan City and relocated it to Samut Prakan Province in 2018. In this season, Samut Prakan City participates in 3 competitions which consisted of the Thai League, FA Cup, and League Cup.

The season was supposed to start on 31 July 2021 and concluded on 21 May 2022. Then, due to the situation of the COVID-19 pandemic is still severe, FA Thailand decided to postpone the season to start on 13 August 2021 instead. However, as it stands on 23 July 2021, the COVID-19's situation is getting even worse. Therefore, FA Thailand decided to postpone the opening day for the second time to start on 3 September 2021.

== Squad ==
As of 22 December 2021

Squad No.	Name	Nationality
Goalkeepers
1	Patiwat Khammai	(Thailand)
18	Supawat Yokakul	(Thailand)
25	Uklit Teerajantranon	(Thailand)
36	Anusit Termmee	(Thailand)
85	Narakorn Khonraengdee	(Thailand)
Defenders
3	Kittipong Sansanit	(Thailand)
4	Suphanan Bureerat (3rd captain)	(Thailand)
5	Sarayut Sompim	(Thailand)
20	Kandanai Thawornsak	(Thailand)
27	Aris Zarifović	(Slovenia)
32	Saksit Jitvijan	(Thailand)
44	Thanakij Khanakai	(Thailand)
45	Supakorn Nutvijit	(Thailand)
73	Anuyut Mudlem	(Thailand)
77	Tharatsarwong Charachid	(Thailand)
Midfielders
6	Nopphon Ponkam	(Thailand)
11	Jaroensak Wonggorn (Vice-captain)	(Thailand)
14	Daisuke Sakai	(Japan)
21	Yutpichai Lertlam	(Thailand)
23	Yuto Ono	(Japan)
26	Chaiyawat Buran	(Thailand)
28	Phoutthasay Khochalern	(Laos)
41	Chitipat Kaeoyos	(Thailand)
49	Jiraaut Wingwon	(Thailand)
54	Suwicha Chittabut	(Thailand)
55	Aphirak Suankan	(Thailand)
68	Khanin Tecksa-Nguan	(Thailand)
79	Apinat Sriponwaree	(Thailand)
-	Kevin Ingreso	(Philippines)
Forwards
7	Settawut Wongsai	(Thailand)
9	Chayawat Srinawong (captain)	(Thailand)
19	Samuel Rosa	(Brazil)
47	Thammarat Tathip	(Thailand)
50	Phiraphat Kamphaeng	(Thailand)
59	Chatri Rattanawong	(Thailand)
78	Phatsaphon Choedvichit	(Thailand)
Players loaned out / left during season
10	Eliandro	(Brazil)

== Transfer ==
=== Pre-season transfer ===
==== In ====
Position	Player	Transferred from	Ref
DF	(Thailand) Tharatsarwong Charachid	(Thailand) Chiangrai City F.C.	Undisclosed
MF	(Thailand) Apinat Sriponwaree	(Thailand) Bangkok F.C.	Undisclosed
FW	(Thailand) Phatsaphon Choedvichit	(Thailand) Wat Bot City F.C.	Undisclosed
DF	(Thailand) Anuyut Mudlem	(Thailand) Pluakdaeng United F.C.	Undisclosed
FW	(Brazil) Eliandro	(Thailand) Chonburi F.C.	Undisclosed
DF	(Thailand) Kittipong Sansanit	(Thailand) Muangthong United F.C.	Undisclosed
GK	(Thailand) Anusit Termmee	(Thailand) Rayong F.C.	Undisclosed
MF	(Japan) Daisuke Sakai	(Japan) Oita Trinita	Undisclosed
MF	(Thailand) Chaiyawat Buran	(Thailand) Chiangrai United F.C.	THB2m
DF	(Thailand) Sarayut Sompim	(Thailand) Buriram United F.C.	Undisclosed
MF	(Laos) Phoutthasay Khochalern	(Thailand) Nakhon Pathom United F.C.	Undisclosed

==== Loan In ====
Position	Player	Transferred from	Ref

==== Out ====
Position	Player	Transferred To	Ref
FW	(Thailand) Mehti Sarakham	(Thailand) PT Prachuap F.C.	Undisclosed
DF	(Thailand) Ernesto	(Thailand) BG Pathum United F.C.	Undisclosed
MF	(Thailand) Apichai Munotsa	(Thailand) Suphanburi F.C.	Undisclosed
DF	(Thailand) Jetjinn Sriprach	(Thailand) Udon Thani F.C.	Undisclosed
DF	(Thailand) Jakkapan Praisuwan	(Thailand) BG Pathum United F.C.	THB5m
MF	(Thailand) Peeradon Chamratsamee	(Thailand) Buriram United F.C.	THB10m
MF	(Thailand) Teeraphol Yoryoei	(Thailand) Muangthong United F.C.	THB3m
MF	(Thailand) Nawapol Rodkeal	Unattached	Released

==== Loan Out ====
Position	Player	Transferred To	Ref

=== Mid-season transfer ===
==== In ====
Position	Player	Transferred from	Ref
FW	(Thailand) Chatri Rattanawong	(Thailand) Sukhothai F.C.	Undisclosed
DF	(Thailand) Kandanai Thawornsak	(Thailand) Chainat Hornbill F.C.	Undisclosed

==== Loan In ====
Position	Player	Transferred from	Ref
MF	(Philippines) Kevin Ingreso	(Thailand) BG Pathum United F.C.	Season loan
FW	(Brazil) Samuel Rosa	(Thailand) Buriram United F.C.	Season loan
FW	(Thailand) Settawut Wongsai	(Thailand) Chonburi F.C.	Season loan

==== Out ====
Position	Player	Transferred To	Ref
FW	(Brazil) Eliandro	Unattached	Mutual Consent

==== Loan Out ====
Position	Player	Transferred To	Ref

== Competitions ==
=== Overview ===
Competition	First match	Last match	Starting round	Record							
Competition	First match	Last match	Starting round	Pld	W	D	L	GF	GA	GD	Win %
Thai League	5 September 2021	21 May 2022	Matchday 1	16	3	6	7	17	21	−4	18.75
FA Cup	27 October 2021		First Round	2	2	0	0	6	1	+5	100.00
League Cup	12 January 2022		First Round	1	1	0	0	3	1	+2	100.00
Total				19	6	6	7	26	23	+3	31.58

Last updated: 12 January 2022
Source: Competitions

=== Thai League 1 ===
==== League table ====
Pos	Team	Pld	W	D	L	GF	GA	GD	Pts	Qualification
12	Ratchaburi Mitr Phol	30	9	9	12	32	36	−4	36	
13	PT Prachuap	30	8	7	15	30	45	−15	31	
14	Suphanburi (R)	30	8	6	16	35	49	−14	30	Relegation to Thai League 2
15	Samut Prakan City (R)	30	6	10	14	29	42	−13	28	Relegation to Thai League 2
16	Chiangmai United (R)	30	4	7	19	28	56	−28	19	Relegation to Thai League 2

Updated to match(es) played on 4 May 2022. Source: Thai League
Rules for classification: 1) Points; 2) Head-to-head points; 3) Head-to-head goals difference; 4) Head-to-head goals scored; 5) Overall goals difference; 6) Overall goals scored; 7) Fair play points; 8) Play-off without extra time;).
(R) Relegated

==== Results summary ====
Overall								Home						Away					
Pld	W	D	L	GF	GA	GD	Pts	W	D	L	GF	GA	GD	W	D	L	GF	GA	GD
16	3	6	7	17	21	−4	15	2	3	2	11	11	0	1	3	5	6	10	−4

==== Results by matchday ====
Matchday	1	2	3	4	5	6	7	8	9	10	11	12	13	14	15	16	17
Ground	A	A	H	A	H	A	A	H	A	H	A	H	A	H	A	H	A
Result	D	W	W	D	L	L	D	D	L	W	L	D	L	L	L	D	
Position	9	5	2	2	5	6	7	8	9	9	11	10	12	12	13	13	

A = Away; H = Home; W = Win; D = Draw; L = Loss

==== Matches ====
Win Draw Loss

5 September 2021 1	Leo Chiangrai United	2-2	Samut Prakan City	Chiang Rai
	Sivakorn 59'; Bill 82'		Chaiyawat 74'; Chayawat 79'	Stadium: Leo Chiangrai Stadium

12 September 2021 2	Nongbua Pitchaya	0-1	Samut Prakan City	Nong Bua Lamphu
			Aris 35'	Stadium: Pitchaya Stadium; Attendance: 463; Referee: Wiwat Jumpaoon

17 September 2021 3	Samut Prakan City	3-1	True Bangkok United	Samut Prakan
	Sakai 47'; Eliandro 56'; Jaroensak 77'		Thossawat (red card) 30'; Peerapat 81'	Stadium: Samut Prakarn SAT Stadium; Attendance: 0 Referee: Kotchapoom Meesridecha

26 September 2021 4	Police Tero	1-1	Samut Prakan City	Bangkok
	Honny 40'		Suphanan 51'	Stadium: Boonyachinda Stadium; Attendance: 0 Referee: Natee Choosuwan

2 October 2021 5	Samut Prakan City	1-3	Chiangmai United	Samut Prakan
	Eliandro 82'		Boli 48' 78'; Kabfah 88'	Stadium: Samut Prakarn SAT Stadium; Attendance: 266; Referee: Warintorn Sassadee

6 October 2021 6	Buriram United	2-1	Samut Prakan City	Buriram
	Rosa 34'; Suphanat 79'		Eliandro 43'	Stadium: Buriram City Stadium; Attendance: 2,635; Referee: Torphong Somsing

10 October 2021 7	PT Prachuap	0-0	Samut Prakan City	Prachuap Khiri Khan
	Mehti (red card) 38'			Stadium: Sam Ao Stadium; Attendance: 513; Referee: Anusorn Nookaew

16 October 2021 8	Samut Prakan City	2-2	Port	Samut Prakan
	Aris 18'; Chayawat 81'		Bordin 60'; Go 75'	Stadium: Samut Prakarn SAT Stadium; Attendance: 648; Referee: Niwat Insa-ard

23 October 2021 9	Nakhon Ratchasima	1-0	Samut Prakan City	Nakhon Ratchasima
	Ouattara 45+2'		Nopphon (yellow card) 35' (yellow-red card) 71'	Stadium: 80th Birthday Stadium; Attendance: 941; Referee: Panumas Phansamo

31 October 2021 10	Samut Prakan City	2-1	Ratchaburi Mitr Phol	Samut Prakan
	Sakai 79' 88'		Derley 67'	Stadium: Samut Prakarn SAT Stadium; Attendance: 450; Referee: Songkran Bunmeekiart

7 November 2021 11	Chonburi	2-1	Samut Prakan City	Chonburi
	Kelić 14'; Kroekrit 20'		Jiraaut 29'	Stadium: Chonburi Stadium; Attendance: 2,974; Referee: Teetichai Nualjan

10 November 2021 12	Samut Prakan City	0-0	Muangthong United	Samut Prakan
				Stadium: Samut Prakarn SAT Stadium; Attendance: 963; Referee: Kotchapoom Meesridaecha

13 November 2021 13	BG Pathum United	1-0	Samut Prakan City	Pathum Thani
			Cardozo 42' (pen.)	Stadium: Leo Stadium; Attendance: 2,349; Referee: Songkran Bunmeekiart

20 November 2021 14	Samut Prakan City	1-2	Suphanburi	Samut Prakan
	Sakai 50'		Danilo 13'; Karaboue 37'	Stadium: Samut Prakarn SAT Stadium; Attendance: 451; Referee: Noppadet Mangngam

27 November 2021 15	Khon Kaen United	1-0	Samut Prakan City	Khon Kaen
	Ibson 15'			Stadium: Khon Kaen Provincial Stadium; Attendance: 3,125; Referee: Sahapop Sriboonlue

8 January 2022 16	Samut Prakan City	2-2	Nongbua Pitchaya	Samut Prakan
	Yuto 7'; Chatri 24'		Hamilton 46'; Tardeli 58'	Stadium: Samut Prakarn SAT Stadium; Attendance: 590; Referee: Songkran Bunmeekiart

16 January 2022 17	True Bangkok United	v	Samut Prakan City	Pathum Thani
				Stadium: Thammasat Stadium

=== Thai FA Cup ===
==== Matches ====
Win Draw Loss

27 October 2021 First Round	Samut Prakan City (T1)	4-1	PT Prachuap (T1)	Samut Prakan
	Chayawat 38'; Eliandro 44' 45+1'; Sakai 84'		Weerawut 61'	Stadium: Samut Prakarn SAT Stadium; Attendance: 173; Referee: Warintorn Sassadee

24 November 2021 Second Round	Samut Prakan City (T1)	2-0	Rasisalai United (TA)	Samut Prakan
	Thitiphong 4' (o.g.); Sarayut 87'			Stadium: Samut Prakarn SAT Stadium; Attendance: 235; Referee: Paisan Bendem-alee

19 January 2022 Third Round	Songkhla (T3)	v	Samut Prakan City (T1)	Songkhla
				Stadium: Tinsulanon Stadium

=== Thai League Cup ===
==== Matches ====
Win Draw Loss

12 January 2022 First Round	Pluakdaeng United (T3)	1-3	Samut Prakan City (T1)	Rayong
	Jakkarin 15'		Jiraaut 33'; Phatsaphon 44' 68'	Stadium: C.K. Stadium; Attendance: 230; Referee: Torphong Somsing

Second Round	v

== Team statistics ==
=== Appearances and goals ===
As of 12 January 2022

No.	Pos.	Player	League		FA Cup		League Cup		Total	
No.	Pos.	Player	Apps.	Goals	Apps.	Goals	Apps.	Goals	Apps.	Goals
1	GK	(Thailand) Patiwat Khammai	16	0	2	0	0	0	18	0
3	DF	(Thailand) Kittipong Sansanit	5+8	0	1+1	0	1	0	7+9	0
4	DF	(Thailand) Suphanan Bureerat	16	1	1+1	0	0	0	17+1	1
5	DF	(Thailand) Sarayut Sompim	15	0	2	1	1	0	18	1
6	MF	(Thailand) Nopphon Ponkam	11+3	0	1+1	0	1	0	13+4	0
7	FW	(Thailand) Settawut Wongsai	1	0	0	0	0+1	0	1+1	0
8	MF	(Philippines) Kevin Ingreso	1	0	0	0	0	0	1	0
9	FW	(Thailand) Chayawat Srinawong	9+1	2	1	1	0	0	10+1	3
11	MF	(Thailand) Jaroensak Wonggorn	9+1	1	1	0	0	0	10+1	1
14	MF	(Japan) Daisuke Sakai	14+1	4	2	1	0	0	16+1	5
18	GK	(Thailand) Supawat Yokakul	0	0	0	0	0	0	0	0
19	FW	(Brazil) Samuel Rosa	1	0	0	0	0	0	1	0
20	DF	(Thailand) Kandanai Thawornsak	0	0	0	0	1	0	1	0
21	MF	(Thailand) Yutpichai Lertlam	3+6	0	1+1	0	1	0	5+7	0
23	MF	(Japan) Yuto Ono	11+1	1	0	0	0	0	11+1	1
25	GK	(Thailand) Uklit Teerajantranon	0	0	0	0	0	0	0	0
26	MF	(Thailand) Chaiyawat Buran	12+1	1	1	0	0+1	0	13+2	1
27	DF	(Slovenia) Aris Zarifović	15	2	2	0	0	0	17	2
28	MF	(Laos) Phoutthasay Khochalern	7+8	0	0	0	0	0	7+8	0
32	DF	(Thailand) Saksit Jitvijan	2+8	0	1	0	1	0	4+8	0
36	GK	(Thailand) Anusit Termmee	0	0	0	0	1	0	1	0
41	MF	(Thailand) Chitipat Kaeoyos	0+2	0	1	0	1	0	2+2	0
44	DF	(Thailand) Thanakij Khanakai	0	0	0	0	0	0	0	0
45	DF	(Thailand) Supakorn Nutvijit	0	0	0	0	0	0	0	0
47	FW	(Thailand) Thammarat Tathip	0+3	0	0+2	0	0	0	0+5	0
49	MF	(Thailand) Jiraaut Wingwon	6+4	1	0+1	0	1	1	7+5	2
50	FW	(Thailand) Phiraphat Kamphaeng	0	0	0	0	0	0	0	0
54	MF	(Thailand) Suwicha Chittabut	0+4	0	1	0	0+1	0	1+5	0
55	MF	(Thailand) Aphirak Suankan	0	0	0	0	1	0	1	0
59	FW	(Thailand) Chatri Rattanawong	1	1	0	0	0+1	0	1+1	1
68	MF	(Thailand) Khanin Tecksa-Nguan	0	0	0	0	0	0	0	0
73	DF	(Thailand) Anuyut Mudlem	0	0	0+1	0	0+1	0	0+2	0
77	DF	(Thailand) Tharatsarwong Charachid	0	0	0	0	0	0	0	0
78	FW	(Thailand) Phatsaphon Choedvichit	6+3	0	1+1	0	1	2	8+4	2
79	MF	(Thailand) Apinat Sriponwaree	0+3	0	1	0	0	0	1+3	0
85	GK	(Thailand) Narakorn Khonraengdee	0	0	0	0	0	0	0	0
Players loaned out / left during season
10	FW	(Brazil) Eliandro	15	3	2	2	0	0	17	5

== Overall summary ==
=== Season summary ===
Games played	19 (16 Thai League, 2 FA Cup, 1 League Cup)
Games won	6 (3 Thai League, 2 FA Cup, 1 League Cup)
Games drawn	6 (6 Thai League, 0 FA Cup, 0 League Cup)
Games lost	7 (7 Thai League, 0 FA Cup, 0 League Cup)
Goals scored	26 (17 Thai League, 6 FA Cup, 3 League Cup)
Goals conceded	23 (21 Thai League, 1 FA Cup, 1 League Cup)
Goal difference	+3
Clean sheets	4 (3 Thai League, 1 FA Cup, 0 League Cup)
Best result	4-1 vs PT Prachuap (27 October 21)
Worst result	1-3 vs Chiangmai United (2 October 21)
Most appearances	3 players (18)
Top scorer	2 players (5)
Points	15

=== Score overview ===
Opposition	Home score	Away score	Double
BG Pathum United		1-0	No
Buriram United		2-1	No
Chiangmai United	1-3		No
Chonburi		2-1	No
Khon Kaen United		1-0	No
Leo Chiangrai United		2-2	No
Muangthong United	0-0		No
Nakhon Ratchasima		1-0	No
Nongbua Pitchaya	2-2	0-1	No
Police Tero		1-1	No
Port	2-2		No
PT Prachuap		0-0	No
Ratchaburi Mitr Phol	2-1		
Suphanburi	1-2		No
True Bangkok United	3-1		
