= 2021–22 Buriram United F.C. season =

Buriram United
2021–22 season
- Chairman: Newin Chidchob
- Head coach: Alexandre Gama (until 28 November 2021); Masatada Ishii (from 1 December 2021)
- Stadium: Chang Arena
- Thai League: 1st
- FA Cup: Winners
- League Cup: Winners
- Champions League: Play-off round
Home colours	Away colours	Third colours

The 2021–22 season is Buriram United's 10th season in the Thai League. (12th if including P.E.A.'s two seasons) The club will participate in the top-level league. They will also participate in two domestic cups, FA Cup and League Cup.

== Club information ==
Owner	Newin Chidchob
Head Coach	(Japan) Masatada Ishii
Team Manager	(Thailand) Tadthep Pitakpoolsin
Assistant managers	(Japan) Masayuki Miura
Goalkeeping Coach	(Serbia) Zoran Mijanović
Conditioning Coach	(Serbia) Goran Basic
Physio	(Serbia) Dušan Nikolic
Head of Youth Development	(England) Andrew Ord
Ground (capacity and dimensions)	Chang Arena (32,600 / 4,046 m^{2})
Training Ground	Chang Training Ground, Buriram; Buriram Training Camp, Buriram; Buriram United Football Camp, Bang Bo, Samut Prakan

Source: on the table

== Squad information ==
As of 6 January 2021

Squad No.	Name	Nationality	Position(s)	Date of birth (age)	Transferred from / Last club	Since
Goalkeepers
1	Siwarak Tedsungnoen	(Thailand)	GK	20 April 1984 (age 42)	(Thailand) TOT S.C.	2010
29	Yotsapon Teangdar	(Thailand)	GK	6 April 1992 (age 34)	Youth academy	2011
60	Nattakit Nimnual	(Thailand)	GK	31 May 2002 (age 24)	Youth academy	2020
78	Ronnachart Phuchum	(Thailand)	GK	18 March 2002 (age 24)	Youth academy	2020
	Nopphon Lakhonphon	(Thailand)	GK	19 July 2000 (age 26)	(Thailand) Nakhon Pathom United F.C.	2012
Defenders
3	Pansa Hemviboon	(Thailand)	DF	8 July 1990 (age 36)	(Thailand) Khon Kaen United	2016
4	Piyaphon Phanichakul	(Thailand)	DF	8 November 1987 (age 39)	(Thailand) Chiangrai United	2020
14	Chitipat Tanklang	(Thailand)	DF	11 August 1991 (age 35)	Youth academy	2012
15	Narubadin Weerawatnodom	(Thailand)	DF	12 July 1994 (age 32)	(Thailand) Police Tero F.C.	2015
18	Apiwat Ngaolamhin	(Thailand)	DF	1 June 1986 (age 40)	(Thailand) Ratchaburi Mitr Phol F.C.	2018
22	Rebin Sulaka	(Iraq)	DF	12 April 1992 (age 34)	(Bulgaria) PFC Levski Sofia	2021
26	Digão	(Brazil)	DF	7 May 1988 (age 38)	(Brazil) Fluminense FC	2020
44	Diego Bardanca	(Philippines) (Spain)	DF	20 March 1993 (age 33)	(Poland) Puszcza Niepołomice	2022
55	Theerathon Bunmathan	(Thailand)	DF	6 February 1990 (age 36)	(Japan) Yokohama F. Marinos	2021
88	Niran Hansson	(Thailand) (Sweden)	DF	22 January 1996 (age 30)	(Thailand) Chonburi	2021
Midfielders
5	Peeradon Chamratsamee	(Thailand)	MF	15 September 1992 (age 34)	(Thailand) Samut Prakan City	2020
8	Ratthanakorn Maikami	(Thailand)	MF	1 January 1998 (age 28)	Youth academy	2016
10	Jakkaphan Kaewprom	(Thailand)	MF	24 May 1988 (age 38)	(Thailand) Muangthong United	2011
11	Chutipol Thongthae	(Thailand)	MF	23 January 1991 (age 35)	(Thailand) PT Prachuap F.C.	2021
17	Chakkit Laptrakul	(Thailand)	MF	2 December 1994 (age 31)	(Thailand) Samut Prakan City	2020
19	Supachok Sarachat	(Thailand)	MF	22 May 1998 (age 28)	Youth academy	2015
62	Airfan Doloh	(Thailand)	MF	26 January 2001 (age 25)	(Thailand) Uthai Thani F.C.	2018
64	Thirapak Prueangna	(Thailand)	MF	15 August 2001 (age 25)	Youth academy	2019
	Havar Dahl	(Thailand) (Norway)	MF		(Thailand) Uthai Thani F.C.	2020
Strikers
9	Supachai Jaided	(Thailand)	FW	1 December 1998 (age 27)	(Thailand) Super Power Samut Prakan	2016
38	Tommy Stevens	(Thailand) (England)	FW	15 March 2001 (age 25)	(England) Reading Academy	2019
40	Ayub Masika	(Kenya)	FW	10 September 1992 (age 34)	(Japan) Vissel Kobe	2021
54	Suphanat Mueanta	(Thailand)	FW	2 August 2002 (age 24)	Youth academy	2018
77	Aung Thu	(Myanmar)	FW	22 May 1995 (age 31)	(Myanmar) Yadanarbon F.C.	2020
99	Jonathan Bolingi	(Democratic Republic of the Congo)	FW	30 June 1994 (age 32)	(Belgium) Royal Antwerp	2021
	Pattara Soimalai	(Thailand)	FW	27 August 2001 (age 25)	(Thailand) Uthai Thani F.C.	2020
Players on loan
2	Sasalak Haiprakhon	(Thailand)	MF	8 January 1996 (age 30)	(Thailand) Bangkok United	2017
6	Tinnakorn Asurin (D)	(Thailand)	DF	19 February 1990 (age 36)	(Thailand) Suphanburi	2020
	Chinnawat Wongchai	(Thailand)	DF	8 December 1996 (age 29)	(Thailand) Rayong F.C.	2021
	Phanawet Ketlakorn	(Thailand)	DF	6 December 1998 (age 27)	Youth Team	2021
	Kittichai Yaidee	(Thailand)	DF	9 February 2002 (age 24)	Youth Team	2021
	Apidet Janngam	(Thailand)	MF	10 March 2002 (age 24)	(Thailand) Uthai Thani F.C.	2020
91	Samuel Rosa Gonçalves	(Brazil)	FW	25 February 1991 (age 35)	(United Arab Emirates) Al Nasr	2020
42	Maxx Peter Creevey	(Thailand) (Australia)	DF	28 April 1995 (age 31)	(Thailand) Surin F.C.	2018
50	Kritsana Daokrajai	(Thailand)	DF	13 March 2001 (age 25)	(Thailand) Uthai Thani F.C.	2019
Players leaving the club mid season
7	Maicon Marques	(Brazil)	FW	18 February 1990 (age 36)	(Brazil) Atlético Mineiro	2020

== Transfers ==
=== In ===
Pre-season

Position	Player	Transferred from	Ref
DF	(Iraq) Rebin Sulaka	(Bulgaria) Levski Sofia	Free
MF	(Thailand) Chutipol Thongthae	(Thailand) PT Prachuap F.C.	Free
MF	(Thailand) Peeradon Chamratsamee	(Thailand) Samut Prakan City F.C.	THB10m + Sarayut Sompim

Mid-season

Position	Player	Transferred from	Ref
DF	(Thailand) Theerathon Bunmathan	(Japan) Yokohama F. Marinos	THB6.6m; USD$200,000
FW	(Democratic Republic of the Congo) Jonathan Bolingi	(Belgium) Royal Antwerp	Undisclosed
FW	(Kenya) Ayub Masika	(Japan) Vissel Kobe	Undisclosed
DF	(Philippines) (Spain) Diego Bardanca	(Poland) Puszcza Niepołomice	Free

=== Out ===
Preseason

Position	Player	Transferred To	Ref
DF	(Thailand) Korrakot Wiriyaudomsiri	(Thailand) Chiangmai United F.C.	Free
DF	(Thailand) Sarayut Sompim	(Thailand) Samut Prakan City F.C.	Part Exchange
MF	(Australia) Brandon O'Neill	(Australia) Perth Glory FC	Free
MF	(Philippines) (Germany) Kevin Ingreso	(Thailand) BG Pathum United F.C.	Free
MF	(Thailand) Watcharakorn Manoworn	(Thailand) Uthai Thani F.C.	Free
MF	(Japan) Hajime Hosogai	(Japan) Thespakusatsu Gunma (J2)	Free

Mid-season

Position	Player	Transferred To	Ref
FW	(Brazil) Maicon Marques		Free

=== Loan Return ===
Pre-season

Position	Player	Transferred from	Ref
GK	(Thailand) Nopphon Lakhonphon	(Thailand) PT Prachuap F.C.	Loan Return
DF	(Thailand) Possawee Muanmart	(Thailand) Ubon Ratchathani F.C.	Loan Return
DF	(Thailand) Sarawut Munjit	(Thailand) Ubon Ratchathani F.C.	Loan Return
DF	(Croatia) Renato Kelić	(Thailand) Chonburi F.C.	Loan Return
DF	(Thailand) Kritsana Daokrajai	(Thailand) Uthai Thani F.C.	Loan Return
DF	(Thailand) Sarayut Sompim	(Thailand) Suphanburi F.C.	Loan Return
MF	(Thailand) Håvar Dahl	(Thailand) Uthai Thani F.C.	Loan Return
MF	(Thailand) Airfan Doloh	(Thailand) Uthai Thani F.C.	Loan Return
MF	(Japan) Hajime Hosogai	(Thailand) Bangkok United F.C.	Loan Return
MF	(Israel) Gidi Kanyuk	(Thailand) Nakhon Ratchasima F.C.	Loan Return
FW	(Thailand) Phongchana Kongkirit	(Thailand) Ubon Ratchathani F.C.	Loan Return
FW	(Thailand) Apidet Janngam	(Thailand) Uthai Thani F.C.	Loan Return
FW	(Thailand) Pattara Soimalai	(Thailand) Uthai Thani F.C.	Loan Return

Mid-season

=== Loan Out ===
Pre-season

Position	Player	Transferred To	Ref
DF	(Thailand) Sasalak Haiprakhon	(South Korea) Jeonbuk Hyundai Motors	6 months loan till 31 Dec 2021
DF	(Croatia) Renato Kelić	(Thailand) Chonburi F.C.	Season loan
DF	(Thailand) Sarawut Munjit	(Thailand) Angthong F.C.	Season loan
DF	(Thailand) Chinnawat Wongchai	(Thailand) PT Prachuap F.C.	Season loan
DF	(Australia) Maxx Creevey	(Thailand) Khon Kaen F.C.	Season loan
DF	(Thailand) Kritsana Daokrajai	(Thailand) Khon Kaen F.C.	Season loan
DF	(Thailand) Thanison Paibulkijcharoen	(Thailand) Khon Kaen F.C.	Season loan
MF	(Thailand) Thirapak Prueangna	(Thailand) Khon Kaen F.C.	Season loan
MF	(Thailand) Thanadol Kaosaart	(Thailand) Khon Kaen F.C.	Season loan
MF	(Israel) Gidi Kanyuk	(Thailand) Chonburi F.C.	Season loan
FW	(Thailand) Pattara Soimalai	(Thailand) Khon Kaen F.C.	Season loan
FW	(Thailand) Apidet Janngam	(Thailand) Uthai Thani F.C.	Season loan
FW	(Thailand) Sarawut Munjit	(Thailand) Angthong F.C.	Season loan

Mid-season

Position	Player	Transferred To	Ref
DF	(Thailand) Tinnakorn Asurin	(Thailand) Khon Kaen United F.C.	Season loan
FW	(Brazil) Samuel Rosa	(Thailand) Samut Prakan City F.C.	Season loan

== Competitions ==
=== Overview ===
Competition	First match	Last match	Starting round	Final position	Record							
Competition	First match	Last match	Starting round	Final position	Pld	W	D	L	GF	GA	GD	Win %
Thai League	4 September 2021	4 May 2022	Matchday 1	Winners	30	19	5	6	48	19	+29	63.33
FA Cup	27 October 2021	22 May 2022	First Round	Winners	6	6	0	0	20	4	+16	100.00
League Cup	12 January 2022	29 May 20222	First Round	Winners	5	5	0	0	13	1	+12	100.00
Champions League	15 March 2022	15 March 2022	Play-off Round	Play-off round	1	0	1	0	1	1	+0	0.00
Total					42	30	6	6	82	25	+57	71.43

Source: Competitions

=== Thai League ===
==== League table ====
Pos	Team	Pld	W	D	L	GF	GA	GD	Pts	Qualification
1	Buriram United (C, Q)	30	19	5	6	48	19	+29	62	Qualification for 2023–24 AFC Champions League group stage
2	BG Pathum United (Q)	30	17	9	4	52	27	+25	60	Qualification for 2023–24 AFC Champions League qualifying play-offs
3	Bangkok United	30	15	8	7	53	30	+23	53	
4	Muangthong United	30	13	10	7	46	35	+11	49	
5	Chiangrai United	30	13	8	9	33	35	−2	47	

Updated to match(es) played on 4 May 2022. Source: Thai League
Rules for classification: 1) Points; 2) Head-to-head points; 3) Head-to-head goals difference; 4) Head-to-head goals scored; 5) Overall goals difference; 6) Overall goals scored; 7) Fair play points; 8) Play-off without extra time;).
(C) Champions; (Q) Qualified for the phase indicated

==== Results overview ====
Overall								Home						Away					
Pld	W	D	L	GF	GA	GD	Pts	W	D	L	GF	GA	GD	W	D	L	GF	GA	GD
30	19	5	6	48	19	+29	62	10	3	2	26	8	+18	9	2	4	22	11	+11

Matchday	1	2	3	4	5	6	7	8	9	10	11	12	13	14	15	16	17	18	19	20	21	22	23	24	25	26	27	28	29	30
Ground	H	H	H	A	A	H (Note: On matchday 6 (v Samut Prakan City), Team will use the old home stadium, Khao Kradong Stadium, instead of Chang Arena that will be used for Asian Cup qualifying play-off match. (Indonesia v Chinese Taipei))	A	H	A	H	A	H	A	H	A	A	H	A	A	H	A	H	A	H	H	H	A	H	A	A
Result	D	W	W	L	W	W	W	W	W	W	L	D	L	W	W	W	W	W	D	L	W	W	W	W	W	L	D	D	W	L
Position	12	2	1	3	1	1	1	1	1	1	1	2	2	2	1	1	1	1	1	1	1	1	1	1	1	1	1	1	1	1

Updated to match(es) played on 4 May 2022. Source: Thai League results
A = Away; H = Home; W = Win; D = Draw; L = Loss

==== Matches ====
4 September 2021 1	Buriram United	0–0	Suphanburi	Buriram
19:00 UTC+7		Report (Club); Report (T1)		Stadium: Chang Arena; Attendance: 5,933; Referee: Warinthorn Satsadee

11 September 2021 2	Buriram United	3–1	Police Tero	Buriram
19:00 UTC+7	Supachok Sarachat 45+3'; Supachai Chaided 66'; Suphanat Mueanta 81'	Report (Club); Report (T1)	Ekkachai Sumrei 44'	Stadium: Chang Arena; Attendance: 5,028; Referee: Sarayut Chakngeon

18 September 2021 3	Buriram United	4–0	Chiangmai United	Buriram
18:30 UTC+7	Samuel Rosa Gonçalves 11'; Supachai Chaided 55'; Chakkit Laptrakul 84'; Peeradon Chamratsamee 90+3'	Report (Club); Report (T1)		Stadium: Chang Arena; Attendance: 5,201; Referee: Wiwat Champa-on

25 September 2021 4	True Bangkok United	2–0	Buriram United	Khlong Luang, Pathum Thani
17:30 UTC+7	Pokklaw 54'; Heberty 71'	Report (Club); Report (T1)		Stadium: Thammasat Stadium; Attendance: 0 Referee: Phairot Bunkumneod

2 October 2021 5	PT Prachuap	0–2	Buriram United	Prachuap Khiri Khan
18:00 UTC+7		Report (Club); Report (T1)	Samuel Rosa Gonçalves 21'; Supachai Chaided 83'	Stadium: Sam Ao Stadium; Attendance: 750; Referee: Sivakorn Pu-udom

6 October 2021 6	Buriram United	2–1	Samut Prakan City	Buriram
19:00 UTC+7	Samuel Rosa Gonçalves 34' (pen.); Suphanat Mueanta 79'	Report (Club); Report (T1)	Eliandro 43'	Stadium: Buriram City Stadium; Attendance: 2,635; Referee: Torpong Somsing

10 October 2021 7	Port	0–2	Buriram United	Khlong Toei, Bangkok
17:00 UTC+7	Sergio Suárez (red card) 75'	Report (Club); Report (T1)	Supachai Chaided 50'; Supachok Sarachat 56'	Stadium: PAT Stadium; Attendance: 1,234; Referee: Chaireag Ngam-som

17 October 2021 8	Buriram United	2–0	Nakhon Ratchasima Mazda	Buriram
19:00 UTC+7	Piyaphon Phanichakul 61'; Samuel Rosa 72'	Report (Club); Report (T1)		Stadium: Chang Arena; Attendance: 6,420; Referee: Warinthorn Satsadee

24 October 2021 9	Ratchaburi Mitr Phol	1–2	Buriram United	Ratchaburi
18:00 UTC+7	Derley 54'	Report (Club); Report (T1)	Supachai Chaided 73'; Samuel Rosa Gonçalves 84'	Stadium: Mitr Phol Stadium; Attendance: 1,985; Referee: Sarayut Chakngoen

31 October 2021 10	Buriram United	2–0	Muangthong United	Buriram
19:00 UTC+7	Samuel Rosa 64'; Narubadin Weerawatnodom 81'	Report (Club); Report (T1)		Stadium: Chang Arena; Attendance: 12,007; Referee: Sivakorn Pu-udom

6 November 2021 11	BG Pathum United	1–0	Buriram United	Thanyaburi, Pathum Thani
18:00 UTC+7	Andrés Túñez 24'	Report (Club); Report (T1)		Stadium: Leo Stadium; Attendance: 1,823; Referee: Warinthorn Satsadee

9 November 2021 12	Buriram United	0–0	Nongbua Pitchaya	Buriram
19:00 UTC+7		Report (Club); Report (T1)		Stadium: Chang Arena; Attendance: 6,065; Referee: Na-thee Choosuwan

13 November 2021 13	Chonburi	2–0	Buriram United	Chonburi
19:00 UTC+7	Dennis Murillo 75' (pen.); Worachit Kanitsribampen 90+5'	Report (Club); Report (T1)		Stadium: Chonburi Stadium; Attendance: 4,120; Referee: Chaireag Ngam-som

20 November 2021 14	Buriram United	4–0	Khon Kaen United	Buriram
17:30 UTC+7	Supachai Chaided 8', 52'; Aung Thu 66', 81'	Report (Club); Report (T1)		Stadium: Chang Arena; Attendance: 7,359; Referee: Wiwat Jumpa-oon

28 November 2021 15	Leo Chiangrai United	0–1	Buriram United	Chiang Rai
19:00 UTC+7		Report (Club); Report (T1)	Supachai Chaided 51'	Stadium: Leo Chiangrai Stadium

16 January 2022 17	Chiangmai United	1–4	Buriram United	Mae Rim, Chiang Mai
18:30 UTC+7	Poonsak Masuk 71'	Report (Club); Report (T1)	Ayub Masika 53'; Supachai Chaided 56', 60'; Suphanat Mueanta 68'	Stadium: 700th Anniversary Stadium; Attendance: 3,696; Referee: Natee Choosuwan

23 January 2022 18	Buriram United	1–0	True Bangkok United	Buriram
19:00 UTC+7	Supachok Sarachat 89'	Report (Club); Report (T1)		Stadium: Chang Arena; Attendance: 16,398; Referee: Noppadet Mangngam; Man of the Match: Supachok Sarachat

29 January 2022 24	Muangthong United	0–1	Buriram United	Pak Kret, Nonthaburi
18:00 UTC+7		Report (T1)	Ratthanakorn Maikami 8'	Stadium: Thunderdome Stadium; Attendance: 5,875; Referee: Sarayut Jakngoen

2 February 2022 16	Police Tero	2–2	Buriram United	Lak Si, Bangkok
18:30 UTC+7	Arthit Boodjinda 90+3', 90+12'	Report (T1)	Supachai Chaided (penalty missed) 41'; Peeradon Chamratsamee 71'; Jonathan Bolingi 90+8'	Stadium: Boonyachinda Stadium; Attendance: 2,375; Referee: Vitsavet Sangnakorn
Note: The match was postponed from 8 January due to a COVID outbreak in the Buriram squad.

6 February 2022 19	Buriram United	1–2	PT Prachuap	Buriram
18:00 UTC+7	Pansa Hemviboon 13'; Jonathan Bolingi (penalty missed) 68'	Report (T1)	Willen Mota 78' (pen.); Patrick Reichelt 85'	Stadium: Chang Arena; Attendance: 8,273; Referee: Phairot Bunkamnoed

12 February 2022 20	Samut Prakan City	0–1	Buriram United	Bang Sao Thong, Samut Prakan
18:00 UTC+7		Report (T1)	Jonathan Bolingi 42'	Stadium: Samut Prakarn SAT Stadium (Keha Bang Phli); Attendance: 2,137; Referee: Chaireag Ngam-som

19 February 2022 21	Buriram United	2–1	Port	Buriram
18:00 UTC+7	Jonathan Bolingi 20' (pen.); Supachai Chaided 78'	Report (T1)	Nattawut Sombatyotha 87'	Stadium: Chang Arena; Attendance: 20,659; Referee: Wiwat Jumpa-oon

27 February 2022 22	Nakhon Ratchasima Mazda	0–3	Buriram United	Nakhon Ratchasima
18:00 UTC+7		Report (T1)	Jonathan Bolingi 28'; Supachai Chaided 44'; Suphanat Mueanta 80'	Stadium: 80th Birthday Stadium; Attendance: 5,500; Referee: Natee Choosuwan

5 March 2022 23	Buriram United	2–0	Ratchaburi Mitr Phol	Buriram
19:00 UTC+7	Jonathan Bolingi 38' (pen.); Peeradon Chamratsamee 90'	Report (T1)		Stadium: Chang Arena; Attendance: 10,021; Referee: Kotchapoom Meesridaecha

9 March 2022 27	Buriram United	2–1	Chonburi	Buriram
18:00 UTC+7	Supachai Chaided 7', 5'	Report (T1)	Yoo Byung-soo 62'	Stadium: Chang Arena; Attendance: 10,102; Referee: Noppadet Mangngam

20 March 2022 25	Buriram United	0–1	BG Pathum United	Buriram
19:00 UTC+7		Report (T1)	Sarach Yooyen 13'	Stadium: Chang Arena; Attendance: 22,079; Referee: Sivakorn Pu-udom

2 April 2022 28	Khon Kaen United	0–0	Buriram United	Khon Kaen
18:00 UTC+7		Report (T1)		Stadium: Khon Kaen P.A.O. Stadium; Attendance: 4,875; Referee: Chaireag Ngam-som

6 April 2022 29	Buriram United	1–1	Leo Chiangrai United	Buriram
18:30 UTC+7	Supachok Sarachat 52' (pen.)	Report (T1)	Getterson 86'	Stadium: Chang Arena; Attendance: 23,046; Referee: Sarayut Jakngoen

10 April 2022 26	Nongbua Pitchaya	0–3	Buriram United	Nong Bua Lamphu
18:30 UTC+7		Report (T1)	Supachok Sarachat 30'; Theerathon Bunmathan 69'; Ayub Masika 82'	Stadium: Pitchaya Stadium; Attendance: 5,098; Referee: Wiwat Jumpa-oon

4 May 2022 30	Suphanburi	2–1	Buriram United	Suphan Buri
18:00 UTC+7	William Henrique 3', 52'	Report (T1)	Jonathan Bolingi 62'	Stadium: Suphan Buri Provincial Stadium; Attendance: 5,667; Referee: Sivakorn Pu-udom

=== FA Cup ===
27 October 2021 First round	Phrae United	0–3	Buriram United	Phrae
18:00 UTC+7		Report (Club); Report (FA)	Maicon Marques 17'; Samuel Rosa Gonçalves 25'; Supachai Chaided 54'	Stadium: Huai Ma Stadium; Attendance: 1,500; Referee: Nathee Choosuwan

24 November 2021 Second round	Buriram United	5–0	Prime Bangkok	Buriram
18:00 UTC+7	Samuel 32'; Maicon Marques 45+2'; Apiwat Ngaolamhin 62'; Chakkit Laptrakul 66'; Chutipol Thongthae 69'	Report (Club); Report (FA)		Stadium: Chang Arena; Attendance: 4,047; Referee: Vitsavet Sangnakorn

19 January 2022 Third round	Buriram United	4–1	Leo Chiangrai United	Buriram
17:00 UTC+7	Jonathan Bolingi 15' (pen.); Rebin Sulaka 28'; Maicon 80' (pen.), 90+3'	Report (Club); Report (FA)	Chotipat Poomkaew 59'	Stadium: Chang Arena; Attendance: 5,070; Referee: Chaireag Ngamsom

16 February 2022 Quarter-finals	Buriram United	4–1	Nongbua Pitchaya	Buriram
18:30 UTC+7	Jonathan Bolingi 4', 57'; Ratthanakorn Maikami 35'; Ayub Masika 88'	Report (FA)	Barros Tardeli 66'	Stadium: Chang Arena; Attendance: 5,316; Referee: Sarayut Jakngoen

18 May 2022 Semi-finals	Suphanburi	2–3	Buriram United	Chonburi
19:00 UTC+7	Danilo Alves 35' (pen.), 64'	Report (FA)	Supachok Sarachat 25', 28'; Suphanat Mueanta 72'	Stadium: Chonburi Stadium; Attendance: 2,155; Referee: Sarayut Chakngoen

22 May 2022 Final	Buriram United	1–0 (a.e.t.)	Nakhon Ratchasima Mazda	Khlong Luang, Pathum Thani
18:00 UTC+7	Jonathan Bolingi 115'	Report (FA)		Stadium: Thammasat Stadium; Attendance: 7,734; Referee: Wiwat Jumpa-oon

=== League Cup ===
12 January 2022 First round	Rayong	0–2	Buriram United	Rayong
19:00 UTC+7		Report (Club); Report (LC)	Sasalak Haiprakhon 40'; Jonathan Bolingi 48'	Stadium: Rayong Province Stadium; Attendance: 1,219; Referee: Wiwat Jumpa-oon

9 February 2022 Second round	Buriram United	4–1	Samut Prakan City	Buriram
18:30 UTC+7	Jonathan Bolingi 18'; Maicon 33'; Supachai Chaided 50'; Ayub Masika 54'	Report (LC)	Sarayut Sompim 90+3'	Stadium: Chang Arena; Attendance: 5,565; Referee: Noppadet Mangngam

8 May 2022 Quarter-finals	Ratchaburi Mitr Phol	0–2	Buriram United	Ratchaburi
18:30 UTC+7		Report (LC)	Jonathan Bolingi 48'; Supachok Sarachat 72'	Stadium: Mitr Phol Stadium; Attendance: 5,382; Referee: Natee Choosuwan

25 May 2022 Semi-finals	Buriram United	1–0	Leo Chiangrai United	Chonburi
19:00 UTC+7	Theerathon Bunmathan 9'	Report (LC)		Stadium: Chonburi Stadium; Attendance: 2,826; Referee: Natee Choosuwan

29 May 2022 Final	PT Prachuap	0–4	Buriram United	Thanyaburi, Pathum Thani
19:00 UTC+7		Report (LC)	Jonathan Bolingi 35', 61'; Peeradon Chamratsamee 90'; Suphanat Mueanta 90+1'	Stadium: BG Stadium; Attendance: 7,628; Referee: Torphong Somsing

=== AFC Champions League ===
==== Play-off round ====
15 March 2022 Play-off	Daegu (South Korea)	1–1 (a.e.t.) (3−2 p)	(Thailand) Buriram United	Daegu, South Korea
19:30 UTC+9	Cesinha 120+1'	Live Report; AFCCL Twitter	Bolingi 120'	Stadium: DGB Daegu Bank Park; Attendance: 3,271; Referee: Bijan Heydari (Iran)
	Penalties
	Bruno Lamas (penalty missed); Kim Jin-hyuk (penalty scored); Lee Keun-ho (penalty scored); Keita Suzuki (penalty scored)		(penalty scored) Ratthanakorn Maikami; (penalty missed) Suphanat Mueanta; (penalty missed) Theerathon Bunmathan; (penalty scored) Sasalak Haiprakhon; (penalty missed) Jonathan Bolingi

== Statistics ==
=== Appearances ===
Players with no appearances are not included in the list.

No.	Pos	Nat	Player	Total		Thai League		FA Cup		League Cup		Champions League	
No.	Pos	Nat	Player	Apps	Goals	Apps	Goals	Apps	Goals	Apps	Goals	Apps	Goals
1	GK	(Thailand) THA	Siwarak Tedsungnoen	37	0	29	0	3	0	4	0	1	0
2	MF	(Thailand) THA	Sasalak Haiprakhon	25	1	15	0	4	0	5	1	1	0
3	DF	(Thailand) THA	Pansa Hemviboon	36	1	26	1	5	0	4	0	1	0
4	DF	(Thailand) THA	Piyaphon Phanichakul	26	1	20	1	3	0	3	0	0	0
5	MF	(Thailand) THA	Peeradon Chamratsamee	33	4	24	3	4	0	4	1	1	0
7	FW	(Brazil) BRA	Maicon Marques	23	5	11	0	6	4	5	1	1	0
8	MF	(Thailand) THA	Ratthanakorn Maikami	39	2	28	1	6	1	4	0	1	0
9	FW	(Thailand) THA	Supachai Chaided	33	16	26	14	4	1	2	1	1	0
10	MF	(Thailand) THA	Jakkaphan Kaewprom	11	0	5	0	3	0	3	0	0	0
11	MF	(Thailand) THA	Chutipol Thongthae	12	1	10	0	1	1	1	0	0	0
14	DF	(Thailand) THA	Chitipat Tanklang	15	0	11	0	2	0	2	0	0	0
15	DF	(Thailand) THA	Narubadin Weerawatnodom	37	1	27	1	5	0	4	0	1	0
17	MF	(Thailand) THA	Chakkit Laptrakul	18	2	11	1	3	1	3	0	1	0
18	DF	(Thailand) THA	Apiwat Ngaolamhin	16	1	11	0	4	1	1	0	0	0
19	MF	(Thailand) THA	Supachok Sarachat	35	8	26	5	5	2	4	1	0	0
22	DF	(Iraq) IRQ	Rebin Sulaka	36	1	26	0	5	1	4	0	1	0
26	DF	(Brazil) BRA	Digão	11	0	11	0	0	0	0	0	0	0
40	FW	(Kenya) KEN	Ayub Masika	21	4	13	2	4	1	4	1	0	0
44	DF	(Spain) ESP	Diego Bardanca	1	0	0	0	0	0	0	0	1	0
54	FW	(Thailand) THA	Suphanat Mueanta	33	6	23	4	5	1	5	1	0	0
55	DF	(Thailand) THA	Theerathon Bunmathan	24	2	15	1	4	0	4	1	1	0
59	GK	(Thailand) THA	Nopphon Lakhonphon	4	0	1	0	2	0	1	0	0	0
62	MF	(Thailand) THA	Airfan Doloh	14	0	10	0	2	0	2	0	0	0
77	FW	(Myanmar) MYA	Aung Thu	28	2	26	2	2	0	0	0	0	0
88	MF	(Thailand) THA	Niran Hansson	1	0	1	0	0	0	0	0	0	0
99	FW	(Democratic Republic of the Congo) COD	Jonathan Bolingi	22	16	12	6	4	4	5	5	1	1
Left club during the season
6	DF	(Thailand) THA	Tinnakorn Asurin	6	0	5	0	1	0	0	0	0	0
76	MF	(Thailand) THA	Kritapat Vichaidit	1	0	0	0	1	0	0	0	0	0
91	FW	(Brazil) BRA	Samuel Rosa	17	8	15	6	2	2	0	0	0	0

Last updated: 29 May 2022
Source: Competitions

=== Goalscorers ===
Includes all competitive matches. The list is sorted by shirt number when total goals are equal.
Player who left the club during the season.
As of match played 29 May 2022

Rank	No.	Player	Thai League	FA Cup	League Cup	ACL	Total
1	9	(Thailand) Supachai Chaided	14	1	1	0	16
1	99	(Democratic Republic of the Congo) Jonathan Bolingi	6	4	5	1	16
3	19	(Thailand) Supachok Sarachat	5	2	1	0	8
3	91	(Brazil) Samuel Rosa Gonçalves	6	2	0	0	8
5	54	(Thailand) Suphanat Mueanta	4	1	1	0	6
6	7	(Brazil) Maicon Marques	0	4	1	0	5
7	5	(Thailand) Peeradon Chamratsamee	3	0	1	0	4
7	40	(Kenya) Ayub Masika	2	1	1	0	4
9	8	(Thailand) Ratthanakorn Maikami	1	1	0	0	2
9	17	(Thailand) Chakkit Laptrakul	1	1	0	0	2
9	55	(Thailand) Theerathon Bunmathan	1	0	1	0	2
9	77	(Myanmar) Aung Thu	2	0	0	0	2
13	2	(Thailand) Sasalak Haiprakhon	0	0	1	0	1
13	3	(Thailand) Pansa Hemviboon	1	0	0	0	1
13	4	(Thailand) Piyaphon Phanichakul	1	0	0	0	1
13	11	(Thailand) Chutipol Thongthae	0	1	0	0	1
13	15	(Thailand) Narubadin Weerawatnodom	1	0	0	0	1
13	18	(Thailand) Apiwat Ngaolamhin	0	1	0	0	1
13	22	(Iraq) Rebin Sulaka	0	1	0	0	1
Totals			48	20	13	1	82

=== Clean sheets ===
As of match played 29 May 2022

No.	Player	Thai League	FA Cup	League Cup	Total
1	(Thailand) Siwarak Tedsungnoen	16	1	4	21
59	(Thailand) Nopphon Lakhonphon	0	2	0	2
Total		16	3	4	23
