= 2021–22 Thai League 1 =

Season of association football league

Thai League 1
- Season: 2021–22
- Dates: 3 September 2021 — 4 May 2022
- Champions: Buriram United
- Relegated: Samut Prakan City; Suphanburi; Chiangmai United
- 2023–24 AFC Champions League: BG Pathum United; Buriram United
- Matches: 240
- Goals: 615 (2.56 per match)
- Top goalscorer: Hamilton Soares (19 goals)
- Biggest home win: 5 goals difference Bangkok United 5–0 Police Tero (9 November 2021)
- Biggest away win: 7 goals difference Khonkaen United 0–7 Chonburi (25 September 2021)
- Highest scoring: 9 goals BG Pathum United 7–2 PT Prachuap (6 April 2022)
- Longest winning run: 6 matches BG Pathum United; Buriram United
- Longest unbeaten run: 16 matches BG Pathum United
- Longest winless run: 14 matches Chiangmai United
- Longest losing run: 7 matches Chiangmai United; Suphanburi
- Highest attendance: 23,046; Buriram United 1–1 Chiangrai United (6 April 2022)
- Lowest attendance: 0
- Total attendance: 528,431
- Average attendance: 2,481
- All statistics correct as of 4 May 2022.

The 2021–22 Thai League 1 is the 25th season of the Thai League 1, the top Thai professional league for association football clubs, since its establishment in 1996, also known as Hilux Revo Thai League due to the sponsorship deal with Toyota Motor Thailand. A total of 16 teams will compete in the league. The season began on 31 July 2021 and is scheduled to conclude in May 2022.

The 1st transfer window is from 4 May to 27 July 2021 while the 2nd transfer window is from 8 December 2021 to 4 January 2022.

BG Pathum United are the defending champions, while Nongbua Pitchaya, Chiangmai United and Khonkaen United have entered as the promoted teams from the 2020–21 Thai League 2.

== Changes from last season ==
=== Team changes ===
==== Promoted clubs ====
Promoted from the 2020–21 Thai League 2

- Nongbua Pitchaya
- Chiangmai United
- Khonkaen United

==== Relegated clubs ====
Relegated from the 2020–21 Thai League 1

- Rayong
- Sukhothai
- Trat

== Teams ==
Locations of the 2021-22 Thai League teams
Football clubs in the Bangkok Metropolitan Region

There are 16 clubs in the league, with three promoted teams from Thai League 2 replacing the three teams that were relegated from the 2020-21 season.

Sukhothai, Trat and Rayong were relegated at the end of the 2020–21 season after finishing in the bottom three places of the table. They were replaced by 2020-21 Thai League 2 champions Nongbua Pitchaya. They were joined by runners-up Chiangmai United, who also got promoted for the first time and Khonkaen United, promotion playoff winner which was first held in 2020–21 season.

=== Stadium and locations ===
Note: Table lists in alphabetical order.

Team	Province	Stadium	Capacity
Bangkok United	Pathum Thani	Thammasat Stadium	25,000
BG Pathum United	Pathum Thani	BG Stadium	10,114
Buriram United	Buriram	Chang Arena	32,600
Chiangrai United	Chiang Rai	Leo Chiangrai Stadium	13,000
Chiangmai United	Chiang Mai	700th Anniversary Stadium	25,000
Chonburi	Chonburi	Chonburi Stadium	8,680
Khonkaen United	Khon Kaen	Khon Kaen PAO Stadium	7,000
Muangthong United	Nonthaburi	Thunderdome Stadium	12,505
Nakhon Ratchasima	Nakhon Ratchasima	80th Birthday Stadium	24,641
Nongbua Pitchaya	Nongbua Lamphu	Pitchaya Stadium	6,000
Police Tero	Bangkok	Boonyachinda Stadium	3,550
Port	Bangkok	PAT Stadium	6,000
PT Prachuap	Prachuap Khiri Khan	Sam Ao Stadium	5,000
Ratchaburi Mitr Phol	Ratchaburi	Mitr Phol Stadium	10,000
Samut Prakan City	Samut Prakan	Samut Prakarn SAT Stadium	5,130
Suphanburi	Suphanburi	Suphan Buri Provincial Stadium	15,279

=== Personnel and sponsoring ===
Note: Flags indicate national team as has been defined under FIFA eligibility rules. Players may hold more than one non-FIFA nationality.

Team	Head coach	Captain	Kit manufacturer	Shirt sponsors
Bangkok United	(Australia) Aurelio Vidmar	(Brazil) Everton	Ari	List: True Huawei Daikin CP Smart Heart Toyota Ziebart Euro Cake
BG Pathum United	(Japan) Makoto Teguramori	(Thailand) Surachart Sareepim	Warrix	Leo; Umay+ Euro Cake; Mitsubishi Electric; Vichaiyut Hospital; Thai-Denmark; Cartoon Club
Buriram United	(Japan) Masatada Ishii	(Thailand) Narubadin Weerawatnodom	Made by club (Domestic); Ari (Asia)	Chang; Grab; Rabbit; Coca-Cola; Muang Thai Insurance; King Power; Yamaha; Thai AirAsia; I-Mobile; TrueVisions; CP; Amari Hotel; Jele
Chiangmai United	(Thailand) Surachai Jirasirichote (interim)	(Thailand) Sirisak Faidong	Grand Sport	Moose; Jele; Thai Vietjet Air; Nuan Bakery; Palaad Tawanron
Chiangrai United	(Brazil) Emerson Pereira	(Thailand) Phitiwat Sukjitthammakul	Grand Sport	Leo; Thai Vietjet Air; TOA
Chonburi	(Thailand) Sasom Pobprasert	(Thailand) Kroekrit Thaweekarn	Nike	Chang; Euro Cake
Khonkaen United	(Brazil) Carlos Eduardo Parreira	(Brazil) Ibson Melo	Ocel	Leo; Krungthai-AXA
Muangthong United	(North Macedonia) Mario Gjurovski	(Thailand) Suporn Peenagatapho	Shoot (Local Brand)	Yamaha; Coca-Cola; AIA; Herbalife Nutrition; I-Mobile; Gulf; Sharp Corporation
Nakhon Ratchasima	(England) Kevin Blackwell	(Thailand) Chalermpong Kerdkaew	Kelme	Mazda; Leo; CP; Central Plaza; Gulf
Nongbua Pitchaya	(Thailand) Thawatchai Damrong-Ongtrakul	(Thailand) Yuttapong Srilakorn	Warrix	Pitchaya; Thai-Denmark
Police Tero	(Thailand) Rangsan Viwatchaichok	(Thailand) Teeratep Winothai	FBT	Chang; CP; Channel 3
Port	(Thailand) Jadet Meelarp	(Spain) David Rochela	Ari	Muang Thai Insurance; AirAsia; CP; Thai AirAsia; Thai Union
PT Prachuap	(Thailand) Issara Sritaro	(Thailand) Adul Muensamaan	Grand Sport	PTG Energy; Euro Cake; 2Gear
Ratchaburi Mitr Phol	(Portugal) Bruno Pereira	(Thailand) Pawee Tanthatemee	Shoot (Local Brand)	Mitr Phol; Kubota; Chang; Euro Cake
Samut Prakan City	(Japan) Yasushi Yoshida	(Thailand) Chayawat Srinawong	Ari	Sanwa; AirAsia
Suphanburi	(Nigeria) Adebayo Gbadebo	(Ivory Coast) Lossemy Karaboue	Warrix	Chang; True

=== Managerial changes ===
Team	Outgoing manager	Manner of departure	Date of vacancy	Week	Table	Incoming manager
PT Prachuap	(Thailand) Thawatchai Damrong-Ongtrakul	End of contract	30 March 2021	Pre-season		(Japan) Masami Taki
Chiangmai United	(Germany) Dennis Amato	Resigned	14 April 2021	Pre-season		(Thailand) Surapong Kongthep
Nongbua Pitchaya	(Thailand) Somchai Chuayboonchum	Sacked	28 April 2021	Pre-season		(Thailand) Thawatchai Damrong-Ongtrakul
BG Pathum United	(Thailand) Dusit Chalermsan	Signed with Rajpracha	29 April 2021	Pre-season		(Australia) Aurelio Vidmar
Khonkaen United	(Thailand) Patipat Robroo	Redesignated	10 May 2021	Pre-season		(Brazil) Carlos Eduardo Parreira
Port	(Thailand) Sarawut Treephan	Redesignated	20 July 2021	Pre-season		(Thailand) Dusit Chalermsan
Chiangmai United	(Thailand) Surapong Kongthep	Resigned	10 October 2021	7	15	(Brazil) Ailton Silva
Port	(Thailand) Dusit Chalermsan	Resigned	11 November 2021	11	8	(Thailand) Sarawut Treephan
BG Pathum United	(Australia) Aurelio Vidmar	Sacked	14 November 2021	13	3	(Thailand) Dusit Chalermsan
PT Prachuap	(Japan) Masami Taki	Sacked	15 November 2021	13	14	(Thailand) Issara Sritaro
Buriram United	(Brazil) Alexandre Gama	Resigned	28 November 2021	15	1	(Japan) Masatada Ishii
Samut Prakan City	(Japan) Masatada Ishii	Signed with Buriram United	11 December 2021	15	13	(Japan) Yasushi Yoshida
BG Pathum United	(Thailand) Dusit Chalermsan	Sacked	17 January 2022	17	5	(Thailand) Surachai Jaturapattarapong (interim)
Ratchaburi Mitr Phol	(Thailand) Somchai Maiwilai	Resigned	26 January 2022	18	12	(Portugal) Bruno Pereira
BG Pathum United	(Thailand) Surachai Jaturapattarapong (interim)	End of interim spell	27 January 2022	18	5	(Japan) Makoto Teguramori
Chiangmai United	(Brazil) Ailton Silva	Resigned	4 February 2022	19	16	(Thailand) Surachai Jirasirichote (interim)
Port	(Thailand) Sarawut Treephan	Resigned	21 February 2022	22	7	(Thailand) Weerayut Binabdullahman (interim)
Port	(Thailand) Weerayut Binabdullahman (interim)	End of interim spell	5 March 2022	23	8	(Thailand) Jadet Meelarp
Nakhon Ratchasima	(Thailand) Teerasak Po-on	Resigned	8 March 2022	24	12	(England) Kevin Blackwell
Bangkok United	(Thailand) Totchtawan Sripan	Redesignated	12 March 2022	24	4	(Australia) Aurelio Vidmar

== Foreign players ==
The FIFA Transfer Window Period for Thailand was 4 May 2021 to 24 July 2021.

Club	Player 1	Player 2	Player 3	Asian Player	ASEAN 1	ASEAN 2	ASEAN 3	Former
Bangkok United	(Brazil) Heberty	(Brazil) Everton	(Brazil) Vander	(Australia) Anthony Carter	(Philippines) Michael Falkesgaard			
BG Pathum United	(Brazil) Victor Cardozo	(Brazil) Diogo	(Venezuela) Andrés Túñez		(Singapore) Irfan Fandi	(Singapore) Ikhsan Fandi		(Japan) Ryo Matsumura (Philippines) Kevin Ingreso
Buriram United	(Brazil) Digão	(Democratic Republic of the Congo) Jonathan Bolingi	(Kenya) Ayub Masika	(Iraq) Rebin Sulaka	(Myanmar) Aung Thu	(Philippines) Diego Bardanca		(Brazil) Maicon (Brazil) Samuel Rosa
Chiangmai United	(Brazil) Bill	(Brazil) Evson	(Ivory Coast) Yannick Boli	(Japan) Sergio Escudero				(Netherlands) Melvin de Leeuw
Chiangrai United	(Brazil) Brinner	(Brazil) Felipe Amorim	(Brazil) Getterson	(Japan) Kohei Kato				(South Korea) Cho Ji-hun (Brazil) Bill
Chonburi	(Brazil) Dennis Murillo	(Israel) Gidi Kanyuk	(Croatia) Renato Kelić	(South Korea) Yoo Byung-soo	(Malaysia) Junior Eldstål	(Brunei) Faiq Bolkiah		
Khonkaen United	(Brazil) Alef	(Brazil) Rômulo	(Brazil) Ibson Melo	(Palestine) Yashir Islame	(Philippines) Joshua Grommen			(Brazil) Douglas Cobo
Muangthong United	(Brazil) Lucas Rocha	(Brazil) Willian Popp	(Estonia) Henri Anier	(Uzbekistan) Sardor Mirzaev	(Philippines) Jesper Nyholm			(Australia) Jesse Curran
Nakhon Ratchasima	(Ivory Coast) Amadou Ouattara	(Ghana) Kwame Karikari	(England) Charlie Clough	(Japan) Shintaro Shimizu	(Philippines) Dennis Villanueva	(Philippines) Dylan De Bruycker		(Austria) Marco Sahanek (Australia) Kwabena Appiah
Nongbua Pitchaya	(Brazil) Airton	(Brazil) Hamilton	(Brazil) Barros Tardeli	(Palestine) Mahmoud Eid	(Philippines) Amani Aguinaldo	(Philippines) Iain Ramsay		(Israel) Lidor Cohen (Iran) Mahan Rahmani
Port	(El Salvador) Nelson Bonilla	(Spain) David Rochela	(Spain) Sergio Suárez	(South Korea) Go Seul-ki	(Philippines) Martin Steuble			(Madagascar) John Baggio (Philippines) Javier Patiño
PT Prachuap	(Brazil) Tauã	(Brazil) Willen Mota	(Montenegro) Adnan Orahovac	(Lebanon) Soony Saad	(Philippines) Patrick Reichelt	(Philippines) Amin Nazari		(Indonesia) Yanto Basna
Police Tero	(Brazil) Evandro Paulista	(Ghana) Isaac Honny	(Ghana) Lesley Ablorh	(Japan) Ryo Matsumura				(Germany) Richard Sukuta-Pasu (Malaysia) Dominic Tan (South Korea) Yang Joon-a
Ratchaburi Mitr Phol	(Brazil) Derley	(Brazil) Rafael Jansen	(Martinique) Steeven Langil	(Jordan) Rajaei Ayed	(Philippines) Bernd Schipmann	(Philippines) Daisuke Sato		(Democratic Republic of the Congo) Junior Mapuku (Iran) Vafa Hakhamaneshi (Switzerland) Sébastien Wüthrich (Philippines) Luke Woodland
Samut Prakan City	(Brazil) Samuel Rosa	(Slovenia) Aris Zarifović	(Japan) Daisuke Sakai	(Japan) Yuto Ono	(Laos) Phoutthasay Khochalern	(Philippines) Kevin Ingreso		(Brazil) Eliandro
Suphanburi	(Brazil) Danilo Almeida Alves	(Brazil) William Henrique	(Ivory Coast) Lossemy Karaboue	(South Korea) Jung Han-cheol	(Philippines) Patrick Deyto			(Brazil) Diego Lorenzi (Philippines) Patrick Reichelt (Philippines) Daisuke Sato (Iran) Hamed Bakhtiari

== League table ==
Pos	Team	Pld	W	D	L	GF	GA	GD	Pts	Qualification
1	Buriram United (C, Q)	30	19	5	6	48	19	+29	62	Qualification for 2023–24 AFC Champions League group stage
2	BG Pathum United (Q)	30	17	9	4	52	27	+25	60	Qualification for 2023–24 AFC Champions League qualifying play-offs
3	Bangkok United	30	15	8	7	53	30	+23	53	
4	Muangthong United	30	13	10	7	46	35	+11	49	
5	Chiangrai United	30	13	8	9	33	35	−2	47	
6	Nongbua Pitchaya	30	13	8	9	42	35	+7	47	
7	Chonburi	30	12	8	10	50	40	+10	44	
8	Port	30	11	6	13	41	37	+4	39	
9	Nakhon Ratchasima	30	10	7	13	33	47	−14	37	
10	Khonkaen United	30	10	7	13	30	43	−13	37	
11	Police Tero	30	8	13	9	33	39	−6	37	
12	Ratchaburi Mitr Phol	30	9	9	12	32	36	−4	36	
13	PT Prachuap	30	8	7	15	30	45	−15	31	
14	Suphanburi (R)	30	8	6	16	35	49	−14	30	Relegation to Thai League 2
15	Samut Prakan City (R)	30	6	10	14	29	42	−13	28	Relegation to Thai League 2
16	Chiangmai United (R)	30	4	7	19	28	56	−28	19	Relegation to Thai League 2

Updated to match(es) played on 4 May 2022. Source: Thai League
Rules for classification: 1) Points; 2) Head-to-head points; 3) Head-to-head goals difference; 4) Head-to-head goals scored; 5) Overall goals difference; 6) Overall goals scored; 7) Fair play points; 8) Play-off without extra time;).
(C) Champions; (Q) Qualified for the phase indicated; (R) Relegated

=== Positions by round ===
The table lists the positions of teams after each week of matches. In order to preserve chronological evolvements, any postponed matches are not included in the round at which they were originally scheduled, but added to the full round they were played immediately afterwards. For example, if a match is scheduled for matchday 13, but then postponed and played between days 16 and 17, it will be added to the standings for day 16.

Team ╲ Round	1	2	3	4	5	6	7	8	9	10	11	12	13	14	15	16	17	18	19	20	21	22	23	24	25	26	27	28	29	30
Buriram United	12	2	1	3	1	1	1	1	1	1	1	2	2	2	1	2	1	1	1	1	1	1	1	1	1	1	1	1	1	1
BG Pathum United	10	1	6	10	6	8	6	4	4	3	3	3	3	3	5	5	5	5	4	4	3	3	2	2	2	2	2	2	2	2
Bangkok United	3	4	8	4	7	4	3	2	2	2	2	1	1	1	2	1	2	2	2	2	2	2	3	3	3	3	3	3	3	3
Muangthong United	7	9	11	6	11	11	7	5	6	7	5	6	5	7	6	6	6	4	5	5	5	6	6	5	7	6	6	4	4	4
Chiangrai United	6	3	5	9	4	3	2	3	3	4	6	5	8	6	7	7	7	7	6	6	6	4	4	4	4	4	4	6	7	5
Nongbua Pitchaya	1	6	10	13	10	10	13	13	10	11	9	9	7	8	8	8	8	8	8	8	8	8	7	7	6	7	7	5	6	6
Chonburi	11	10	3	1	2	5	4	7	7	5	4	4	4	4	3	3	3	3	3	3	4	5	5	6	5	5	5	7	5	7
Port	5	11	4	7	3	2	5	6	5	6	8	7	6	5	4	4	4	6	7	7	7	7	8	8	8	8	9	9	8	8
Nakhon Ratchasima	16	16	11	12	8	7	11	12	8	8	7	8	9	9	10	12	9	9	9	9	11	12	12	12	13	13	12	11	9	9
Khonkaen United	15	8	12	14	15	16	16	15	15	12	13	11	13	13	12	10	10	11	10	10	9	9	9	9	9	9	8	8	10	10
Police Tero	4	15	15	15	16	13	9	9	11	10	10	12	10	11	9	9	11	10	11	11	10	10	10	10	10	11	10	10	11	11
Ratchaburi Mitr Phol	2	7	7	11	14	12	10	10	12	13	12	13	11	10	11	11	12	12	12	13	12	11	11	11	12	10	11	12	12	12
PT Prachuap	8	14	14	8	12	14	14	11	13	14	14	14	14	15	15	15	15	15	15	15	14	14	14	13	11	12	13	13	13	13
Suphanburi	13	12	9	5	9	9	12	14	14	15	15	15	15	14	14	14	13	14	13	12	13	13	13	14	14	14	14	14	15	14
Samut Prakan City	9	5	2	2	5	6	8	8	9	9	11	10	12	12	13	13	14	13	14	14	15	15	15	15	15	15	15	15	14	15
Chiangmai United	14	13	16	16	13	15	15	16	16	16	16	16	16	16	16	16	16	16	16	16	16	16	16	16	16	16	16	16	16	16

Leader and qualification to the 2023-24 AFC Champions League Group Stage
Qualification to the 2023-24 AFC Champions League Qualifying Play-Offs
Relegation to the 2022–23 Thai League 2

Updated to match(es) played on 4 May 2022. Source: Thai League

=== Results by match played ===
Team ╲ Round	1	2	3	4	5	6	7	8	9	10	11	12	13	14	15	16	17	18	19	20	21	22	23	24	25	26	27	28	29	30
Buriram United	D	W	W	L	W	W	W	W	W	W	L	D	L	W	W	W	W	W	D	L	W	W	W	W	W	L	D	D	W	L
BG Pathum United	D	W	W	L	L	W	W	W	W	W	D	W	L	L	D	D	D	D	W	D	W	D	W	D	W	W	W	W	W	W
Bangkok United	W	D	L	W	W	W	W	W	L	D	W	W	W	W	L	D	L	L	W	D	L	D	D	D	W	W	D	L	W	W
Muangthong United	D	D	W	L	D	W	L	W	W	L	W	D	W	L	W	D	D	W	L	W	D	L	D	W	D	W	D	W	L	W
Chiangrai United	D	W	D	L	W	W	W	L	W	L	L	W	L	W	L	W	W	L	D	W	L	W	D	W	D	L	D	D	D	W
Nongbua Pitchaya	W	L	L	W	D	L	L	W	D	W	D	W	W	L	L	D	W	D	W	D	D	L	W	W	W	L	W	D	L	W
Chonburi	D	D	W	W	L	L	W	L	D	W	W	W	W	D	W	D	L	W	W	L	L	L	D	D	L	W	W	L	D	L
Port	D	D	W	L	W	W	L	D	W	L	L	W	W	W	W	D	D	L	L	W	L	L	L	L	D	W	L	L	W	L
Nakhon Ratchasima	L	L	W	D	W	D	L	L	W	W	W	D	L	D	L	W	D	W	L	L	L	D	L	D	L	L	W	W	W	L
Khonkaen United	L	W	L	L	L	D	L	W	L	W	D	W	L	L	W	W	D	L	W	D	W	W	L	L	D	D	L	D	L	L
Police Tero	D	L	L	D	L	W	W	D	L	W	D	L	W	D	W	L	D	D	D	D	W	D	D	L	D	L	W	D	L	W
Ratchaburi Mitr Phol	W	L	D	L	D	W	D	L	L	L	W	L	W	W	L	D	L	L	D	D	W	W	D	L	L	W	L	D	D	W
PT Prachuap	D	L	D	W	L	L	D	W	L	L	L	L	L	D	D	L	L	L	W	W	W	D	W	W	W	L	L	L	D	L
Suphanburi	D	D	D	W	L	D	L	L	L	L	L	L	L	W	W	W	L	W	W	L	L	W	L	L	D	D	L	L	L	W
Samut Prakan City	D	W	W	D	L	L	D	D	L	W	L	D	L	L	L	D	D	D	L	L	L	D	W	D	L	L	L	W	W	L
Chiangmai United	L	D	L	D	W	L	L	L	D	L	L	L	L	L	L	L	D	L	L	W	W	L	L	D	L	D	L	D	W	L

Updated to match(es) played on 4 May 2022. Source: Thai League
W = Win; D = Draw; L = Lose

== Results ==
Home \ Away	BKU	BGP	BRU	CMU	CRU	CBR	KKU	MTU	NRM	NON	PTR	POR	PTP	RBM	SPC	SPB
Bangkok United	—	1–1	2–0	4–2	3–0	1–0	2–2	3–1	2–2	1–1	5–0	1–1	2–1	0–0	2–0	5–2
BG Pathum United	1–0	—	1–0	4–1	0–2	4–1	2–1	2–1	3–0	1–1	0–3	2–1	7–2	2–0	1–0	2–0
Buriram United	1–0	0–1	—	4–0	1–1	2–1	4–0	2–0	2–0	0–0	3–1	2–1	1–2	2–0	2–1	0–0
Chiangmai United	1–2	1–3	1–4	—	0–1	1–1	0–2	1–1	1–1	1–3	1–0	0–2	0–1	1–2	2–0	1–2
Chiangrai United	0–4	1–2	0–1	0–0	—	1–0	1–0	0–1	3–2	2–1	0–0	0–4	1–2	0–0	2–2	2–2
Chonburi	1–1	1–1	2–0	1–1	2–3	—	2–0	1–1	1–2	3–1	1–2	3–2	2–1	3–0	2–1	1–0
Khonkaen United	0–1	2–2	0–0	2–1	0–1	0–7	—	2–1	1–1	1–0	1–1	0–0	2–1	0–2	1–0	2–0
Muangthong United	3–1	2–2	0–1	2–0	1–1	3–3	3–1	—	4–1	1–1	2–1	2–1	2–1	2–1	5–2	2–1
Nakhon Ratchasima	0–2	0–0	0–3	2–2	1–0	0–0	1–2	2–0	—	0–4	1–0	3–1	2–3	1–0	1–0	2–1
Nongbua Pitchaya	1–0	3–1	0–3	3–1	1–2	3–2	1–0	0–0	2–0	—	1–0	0–1	1–0	1–1	0–1	2–1
Police Tero	1–4	1–1	2–2	1–0	3–2	2–0	1–1	0–2	0–1	1–1	—	2–1	0–0	2–2	1–1	1–0
Port	1–1	1–0	0–2	1–2	0–0	1–2	2–0	1–0	3–2	3–0	3–3	—	2–0	1–0	0–2	2–0
PT Prachuap	1–0	0–0	0–2	2–1	1–3	1–2	0–1	2–2	1–2	2–3	1–1	1–0	—	1–0	0–0	1–2
Ratchaburi Mitr Phol	1–2	1–1	1–2	2–0	0–1	2–2	2–1	0–1	3–2	3–2	0–0	3–2	2–0	—	0–0	2–1
Samut Prakan City	3–1	0–3	0–1	1–3	1–2	1–2	2–1	0–0	1–1	2–2	1–1	2–2	0–0	2–1	—	1–2
Suphanburi	2–0	0–2	2–1	2–2	0–1	2–1	2–4	1–1	2–0	1–3	1–2	2–1	2–2	1–1	1–2	—

Updated to match(es) played on 4 May 2022. Source: Thai League
Legend: Blue = home team win; Yellow = draw; Red = away team win.

== Season statistics ==
=== Top scorers ===
As of 4 May 2022.

Rank	Player	Club	Goals
1	(Brazil) Hamilton	Nongbua Pitchaya	19
2	(Brazil) Ibson Melo	Khonkaen United	17
3	(Brazil) Heberty	Bangkok United	15
3	(Brazil) Willian Popp	Muangthong United	15
5	(Thailand) Supachai Chaided	Buriram United	14
6	(Brazil) Bill	Chiangrai United (8 Goals); Chiangmai United (5 Goals)	13
6	(Ghana) Kwame Karikari	Nakhon Ratchasima	13
6	(Brazil) Willen Mota	PT Prachuap	13
6	(Brazil) Derley	Ratchaburi Mitr Phol	13
10	(South Korea) Yoo Byung-soo	Chonburi	12

=== Top assists ===
As of 4 May 2022.

Rank	Player	Club	Assists
1	(Thailand) Pakorn Prempak	Port	11
2	(Brazil) Heberty	Bangkok United	9
3	(Brazil) Vander	Bangkok United	7
3	(Thailand) Chaowat Veerachat	BG Pathum United	7
3	(Brazil) Samuel	Buriram United (4) / Samut Prakan City (3)	7
6	(Thailand) Worachit Kanitsribampen	Chonburi (4) / BG Pathum United (2)	6
6	(Thailand) Lursan Thiamrat	Nongbua Pitchaya	6
6	(Martinique) Steeven Langil	Ratchaburi Mitr Phol	6

=== Hat-tricks ===
Player	For	Against	Result	Date
(Brazil) Dennis Murillo^{4}	Chonburi	Khonkaen United	7–0 (A)	25 September 2021
(Thailand) Worachit Kanitsribampen	Chonburi	Khonkaen United	7–0 (A)	25 September 2021
(Brazil) Bill	Chiangrai United	Chonburi	3–2 (A)	1 October 2021
(Spain) Sergio Suárez	Port	Chiangrai United	4–0 (A)	14 November 2021
(Brazil) Derley	Ratchaburi Mitr Phol	Nongbua Pitchaya	3–2 (H)	21 November 2021
(Singapore) Ikhsan Fandi^{4} (Note: Fastest hat-trick in Thai league history at 9 minutes. Ikhsan's 4 goal haul in 11 minutes placed him only 2nd in the fastest goal hauls of the 21st century in top flight league football ahead of Kylian Mbappé's 13 minutes against Olympique Lyonnais in 2018, who also scored 4, and behind Robert Lewandowski's 5 goals in 9 minutes (Lewandowski scored his 4th goal by the 6th minute) against VfL Wolfsburg in 2016.)	BG Pathum United	PT Prachuap	7–2 (H)	6 April 2022
(Brazil) Heberty	Bangkok United	Suphanburi	5–2 (H)	1 May 2022

Notes

^{4} Player scored 4 goals

=== Clean sheets ===
As of 4 May 2022.

Rank	Player	Club	Clean sheets
1	(Thailand) Siwarak Tedsungnoen	Buriram United	16
2	(Thailand) Worawut Srisupha	Port	10
3	(Thailand) Apirak Worawong	Chiangrai United	9
4	(Thailand) Chatchai Budprom	BG Pathum United	7
4	(Thailand) Kampol Pathomakkakul	Ratchaburi Mitr Phol	7
6	(Philippines) Michael Falkesgaard	Bangkok United	6
6	(Thailand) Chanin Sae-ear	Chonburi	6
6	(Thailand) Pisan Dorkmaikaew	Nakhon Ratchasima	6
6	(Thailand) Kittikun Jamsuwan	Nongbua Pitchaya	6
6	(Thailand) Kwanchai Suklom	PT Prachuap	6
6	(Thailand) Patiwat Khammai	Samut Prakan City	6

== Awards ==
=== Monthly awards ===
Month	Coach of the Month		Player of the Month		Goal of the month		Reference
Month	Coach	Club	Player	Club	Player	Club	Reference
September	(Thailand) Sasom Pobprasert	Chonburi	(Brazil) Ibson Melo	Khonkaen United	(Martinique) Steeven Langil	Ratchaburi Mitr Phol	
October	(Brazil) Alexandre Gama	Buriram United	(Brazil) Samuel Rosa	Buriram United	(Brazil) Hamilton	Nongbua Pitchaya	
November	(Thailand) Totchtawan Sripan	Bangkok United	(Thailand) Worachit Kanitsribampen	Chonburi	(Thailand) Naruphol Ar-romsawa	Nakhon Ratchasima	
January	(Japan) Masatada Ishii	Buriram United	(South Korea) Yoo Byung-soo	Chonburi	(Thailand) Saharat Pongsuwan	PT Prachuap	
February	(Thailand) Issara Sritaro	PT Prachuap	(Thailand) Theerathon Bunmathan	Buriram United	(Brazil) William Henrique	Suphanburi	
March	(Thailand) Issara Sritaro	PT Prachuap	(Brazil) Hamilton	Nongbua Pitchaya	(Thailand) Sarach Yooyen	BG Pathum United	
April	(Japan) Makoto Teguramori	BG Pathum United	(Singapore) Ikhsan Fandi	BG Pathum United	(Brazil) Heberty	Bangkok United	

=== Season awards ===
2020–21 Thai League Best XI

Award	Winner	Club
Thai League Manager of the Year	(Japan) Masatada Ishii	Buriram United
Thai League Most Valuable Player	(Thailand) Supachai Chaided	Buriram United

Thai League Best XI
Attack	(Brazil) Hamilton (Nongbua Pitchaya)		(Brazil) Heberty (Bangkok United)		(Thailand) Supachai Chaided (Buriram United)
Midfield	(Thailand) Chaowat Veerachat (BG Pathum United)		(Thailand) Weerathep Pomphan (Muangthong)		(Thailand) Pakorn Prempak (Port)
Defence	(Thailand) Theerathon Bunmathan (Buriram United)	(Brazil) Everton (Bangkok United)	(Iraq) Rebin Sulaka (Buriram United)	(Thailand) Santiphap Channgom (BG Pathum United)	
Goalkeeper	(Thailand) Kampol Pathomakkakul (Ratchaburi Mitr Phol)				

== Attendances ==
=== Overall statistical table ===
Pos	Team	Total	High	Low	Average	Change
1	Buriram United	161,226	23,046	2,635	10,748	+19.0%
2	Muangthong United	43,213	5,875	0	3,324	−28.3%
3	BG Pathum United	31,251	4,927	0	3,125	−24.8%
4	Chonburi	38,382	4,200	0	2,952	−37.9%
5	Khonkaen United	43,675	4,875	1,021	2,912	+0.9%^{†}
6	Nakhon Ratchasima	33,066	5,500	0	2,362	−48.6%
7	Nongbua Pitchaya	28,003	5,098	418	1,867	+21.9%^{†}
8	Ratchaburi Mitr Phol	27,259	2,454	1,215	1,817	−49.8%
9	Suphanburi	19,522	5,667	0	1,627	−58.6%
10	Port	18,263	2,875	0	1,522	−49.0%
11	Chiangmai United	19,762	3,696	0	1,520	+155.9%^{†}
12	Bangkok United	14,351	2,672	0	1,435	−40.6%
13	Police Tero	15,464	2,423	0	1,289	−19.3%
14	Chiangrai United	15,419	2,411	262	1,028	−65.0%
15	Samut Prakan City	11,689	2,137	0	835	−48.1%
16	PT Prachuap	8,516	1,050	0	608	−65.3%
	League total	528,431	23,046	0	2,481	−25.0%

Updated to games played on 4 May 2022
Source: Thai League
Notes:
^{†} Teams played previous season in Thai League 2

=== Attendances by home match played ===
Team \ Match played	1	2	3	4	5	6	7	8	9	10	11	12	13	14	15	Total
Bangkok United	0	0	0	0	0	956	2,404	847	1,068	1,050	2,672	1,921	1,095	1,085	1,253	14,351
BG Pathum United	0	0	0	0	0	1,678	1,823	2,349	3,321	3,032	3,220	4,314	3,186	3,401	4,927	31,251
Buriram United	5,933	5,028	5,201	2,635	6,420	12,007	6,065	7,359	16,398	8,273	20,659	10,021	10,102	22,079	23,046	161,226
Chiangmai United	0	0	1,245	642	1,332	1,259	1,669	3,696	1,094	1,247	1,228	1,508	1,109	1,565	2,168	19,762
Chiangrai United	262	388	429	358	1,038	526	702	1,020	2,411	1,309	1,462	2,284	1,200	631	1,399	15,419
Chonburi	0	0	1,425	2,030	1,980	2,974	4,120	3,520	3,204	3,151	4,200	3,055	3,201	2,973	2,549	38,382
Khonkaen United	1,021	1,109	1,625	1,234	1,548	1,618	3,248	3,125	3,245	3,144	4,864	4,512	4,495	4,875	4,012	43,675
Muangthong United	0	0	1,092	1,745	1,845	2,145	2,148	2,414	5,237	5,875	4,985	3,328	2,937	5,635	3,827	43,213
Nakhon Ratchasima	0	539	899	941	1,840	2,876	2,944	2,075	2,085	2,765	2,253	5,500	1,865	3,377	3,107	33,066
Nongbua Pitchaya	418	463	462	849	416	731	1,009	1,772	1,854	2,124	3,793	3,993	2,924	5,098	2,097	28,003
Police Tero	0	0	0	1,112	848	808	779	2,375	1,225	1,306	2,423	1,273	1,072	1,026	1,217	15,464
Port	0	0	0	1,234	936	1,313	1,088	1,207	1,053	1,681	1,825	1,862	1,629	1,560	2,875	18,263
PT Prachuap	0	750	513	400	426	512	763	578	445	481	667	498	720	713	1,050	8,516
Ratchaburi Mitr Phol	1,270	1,659	1,985	1,215	1,224	1,632	2,196	1,986	1,746	1,632	1,481	1,477	2,454	2,347	2,325	27,259
Samut Prakan City	0	266	648	450	963	451	590	486	2,137	604	673	817	854	789	1,961	11,689
Suphanburi	0	0	0	925	1,106	616	653	1,101	1,318	2,179	1,419	1,831	1,430	1,277	5,667	19,522

Source: Thai League

== See also ==
- 2021–22 Thai League 2
- 2021–22 Thai League 3
- 2022 Thailand Amateur League
- 2021–22 Thai FA Cup
- 2021–22 Thai League Cup
- 2021 Thailand Champions Cup
