= Aris Zarifović =

Slovenian footballer

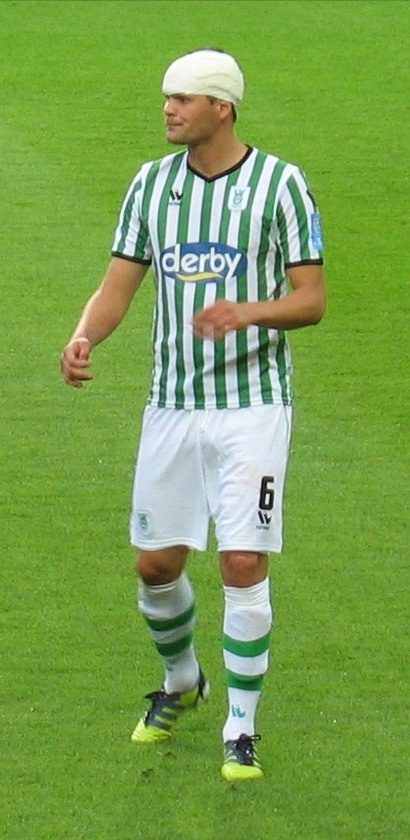
- Zarifović with Olimpija Ljubljana in 2012

Personal information
- Date of birth: 2 June 1988 (age 38)
- Place of birth: Šempeter pri Gorici, SR Slovenia, Yugoslavia
- Height: 1.89 m (6 ft 2 in)
- Position: Centre-back

Team information
- Current team: Tolmin

Youth career
- 2000–2007: Gorica

Senior career*
Years	Team	Apps	(Gls)
2007–2012	Gorica	85	(6)
2007–2008	→ Brda (loan)	14	(1)
2008–2009	→ Brda (loan)	19	(1)
2012–2019	Olimpija Ljubljana	112	(5)
2019–2022	Samut Prakan City	80	(8)
2022–2023	PT Prachuap	17	(4)
2023–2024	Gemonese 1919		
2024–	Tolmin	12	(1)
- * Club domestic league appearances and goals as of 26 October 2024

Aris Zarifović (born 2 June 1988) is a Slovenian footballer who plays as a centre-back for Tolmin.

== Club career ==
Zarifović played for the youth teams of Slovenian club ND Gorica before starting his professional career in the 2007–08 season, in which he played three matches for Gorica's first team in the Slovenian PrvaLiga. During his five years at the club, he appeared in 85 games, scoring six goals in the process.

In May 2012, he joined Olimpija Ljubljana, signing a four-year deal. In December 2015, his contract was extended until 2018, and in March 2018, it was extended again, this time until 2021. During his time at Olimpija, he played a total of 150 games across all competitions, scored eight goals, and won the PrvaLiga twice with the team.

In January 2019, Zarifović signed a contract with Thai League 1 side Samut Prakan City. After the club was relegated at the end of the 2021–22 season, he left Samut Prakan and joined PT Prachuap on a one-year deal.

== Honours ==
Olimpija Ljubljana

- Slovenian PrvaLiga: 2015–16, 2017–18
- Slovenian Football Cup: 2017–18
