= Chatri Rattanawong =

Thai footballer

Personal information
- Full name: Chatri Rattanawong
- Date of birth: 5 December 1993 (age 32)
- Place of birth: Mukdahan, Thailand
- Height: 1.80 m (5 ft 11 in)
- Position: Forward

Team information
- Current team: Fleet
- Number: 18

Senior career*
| Years | Team | Apps | (Gls) |
| 2016 | Sisaket United | 12 | (4) |
| 2016–2018 | Sisaket | 23 | (5) |
| 2017 | → Sisaket United (loan) | 29 | (22) |
| 2019–2020 | Chainat Hornbill | 28 | (6) |
| 2020–2021 | Sukhothai | 13 | (1) |
| 2021–2022 | Samut Prakan City | 11 | (1) |
| 2022–2023 | Nongbua Pitchaya | 15 | (0) |
| 2023–2025 | Lampang | 28 | (8) |
| 2025– | Fleet | 0 | (0) |
- * Club domestic league appearances and goals as of 15 January 2026

Chatri Rattanawong (Thai: ชาตรี รัตนวงษ์, born 5 December 1993) is a Thai professional footballer who plays as a forward for Thai League 3 club Fleet.
