= Supawat Yokakul =

Thai footballer (born 2000)

Personal information
- Full name: Supawat Yokakul
- Date of birth: 10 February 2000 (age 26)
- Place of birth: Surat Thani, Thailand
- Height: 1.88 m (6 ft 2 in)
- Position: Goalkeeper

Youth career
- 2014–2018: Suankularb Wittayalai School

Senior career*
Years	Team	Apps	(Gls)
2019–2023	Samut Prakan City	14	(0)
2023–2023	Chonburi	0	(0)
2024–2025	Suphanburi	15	(0)

International career
2018	Thailand U19	1	(0)
- * Club domestic league appearances and goals as of 26 April 2025

Supawat Yokakul (Thai: ศุภวัฒน์ โยคะกุล; born 10 February 2000) is a Thai professional footballer who plays as a goalkeeper.

== International career ==
In 2020, He squad for the 2020 AFC U-23 Championship with Thailand U23.
