= Issara Sritaro =

Thai footballer and manager (born 1980)

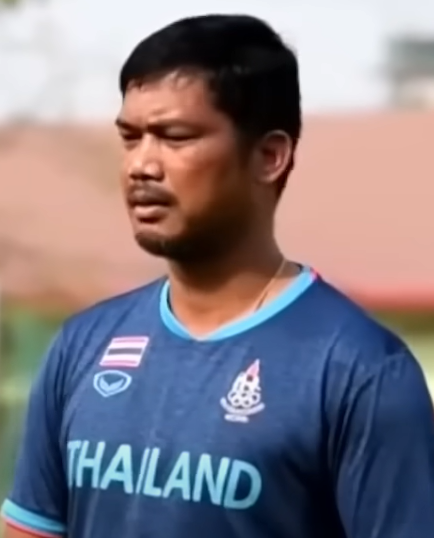
- Sritaro in 2023

Personal information
- Full name: Issara Sritaro
- Date of birth: 18 January 1980 (age 46)
- Place of birth: Suphan Buri, Thailand
- Height: 1.79 m (5 ft 10 1/2 in)
- Position: Defensive midfielder

Senior career*
Years	Team	Apps	(Gls)
- Bangkok Bank

International career
1996–1997	Thailand U17		

Managerial career
- 2012–2014: Chainat Hornbill
- 2015: Army United
- 2015–2016: Chainat Hornbill
- 2016–2017: Thailand U23 (assistant)
- 2017: Thailand U23 (caretaker)
- 2017: Looktabfah
- 2017–2018: Buriram United B
- 2018–2019: Thailand U19
- 2019–2021: Thailand (assistant)
- 2019–2021: Thailand U23 (assistant)
- 2021–2022: PT Prachuap
- 2022–2024: Thailand U23
- 2024–2025: Suphanburi
- 2025: Nakhon Ratchasima
- * Club domestic league appearances and goals

Issara Sritaro (Thai: อิสระ ศรีทะโร) a Thai professional football coach and former player who was most recently the head coach of Thai League 1 club Nakhon Ratchasima.

== Managerial career ==
=== Chainat Hornbill ===
In November 2015, it was announced that Issara would become the new head coach of Chainat Hornbill again after he left the team in 2014 and came back in 2015 to 2016.

=== Nakhon Ratchasima ===
On 15 May 2025, Issara Sritaro was appointed manager of Thai League 1 club Nakhon Ratchasima, replacing the departing Teerasak Po-on.

== Managerial statistics ==
As of match played 29 November 2025

Managerial record by team and tenure
Team	Nat.	From	To	Record					Ref.
Team	Nat.	From	To	G	W	D	L	Win %	Ref.
Army United	(Thailand)	20 June 2015	17 October 2015	15	2	6	7	13.33	
Chainat Hornbill	(Thailand)	9 November 2015	25 April 2016	13	4	2	7	30.77	
Thailand U19	(Thailand)	13 February 2018	10 November 2019	14	5	4	5	35.71	
PT Prachuap	(Thailand)	15 November 2021	31 May 2022	20	10	2	8	50.00	
Thailand U23	(Thailand)	8 November 2022	23 April 2023	29	14	5	10	48.28	
Suphanburi	(Thailand)	2 August 2024	26 April 2025	37	8	7	22	21.62	
Nakhon Ratchasima	(Thailand)	15 May 2025	29 November 2025	14	2	4	8	14.29	
Career Total				142	45	30	67	31.69	

== Honours ==
=== Manager ===
Thailand U23

- Southeast Asian Games: 2021 Silver medalist

Individual

- Thai League 1 Coach of the Month: February 2022, March 2022
