= Tetsuya Murayama =

Japanese football manager

Personal information
- Full name: Tetsuya Murayama
- Date of birth: 20 October 1974 (age 52)
- Place of birth: Tokyo, Japan

Managerial career
- Years: Team
- 2019: Samut Prakan City

Tetsuya Murayama (村山 哲也, Murayama Tetsuya) is a former Japanese football manager. He last managed Samut Prakan City.
