= Nopphon Ponkam =

Thai footballer

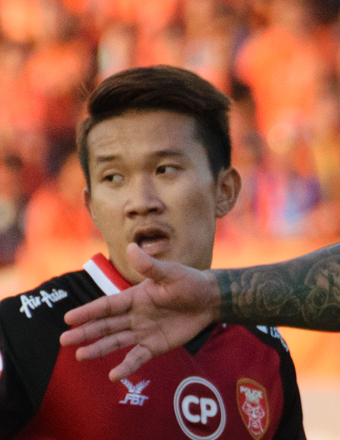

Personal information
- Full name: Nopphon Ponkam
- Date of birth: 19 July 1996 (age 30)
- Place of birth: Roi Et, Thailand
- Height: 1.75 m (5 ft 9 in)
- Position: Defensive midfielder

Team information
- Current team: Khon Kaen United
- Number: 18

Youth career
- 2011–2013: Rajdamnern Commercial College

Senior career*
Years	Team	Apps	(Gls)
2013–2018	Police Tero	30	(1)
2013	→ RBAC (loan)	0	(0)
2013–2015	→ BCC Tero (loan)	28	(1)
2016–2017	→ Air Force Central (loan)	24	(2)
2019–2023	Samut Prakan City	67	(0)
2022–2023	→ Nakhon Ratchasima (loan)	26	(0)
2023–2024	PT Prachuap	32	(0)
2024–	Khon Kaen United	15	(0)

International career
2013–2014	Thailand U19	14	(2)
2016–2018	Thailand U23	15	(0)
Medal record
Thailand under-21
Nations Cup
Winner	Nations Cup 2016	Football
Thailand under-23
Southeast Asian Games
Gold medal – first place	Sea Games 2017	Football
- * Club domestic league appearances and goals as of 13 April 2025 (UTC)

Nopphon Ponkam (Thai: นพพล พลคํา, born: July 19, 1996), simply known as Pae (Thai: เป้), is a Thai professional footballer who plays as a defensive midfielder for Khon Kaen United.

== International career ==
In August 2017, he won the Football at the 2017 Southeast Asian Games with Thailand U23.

In January 2018, he was in the squad of Thailand U23 for 2018 AFC U-23 Championship at China.

== Honours ==
=== International ===
Thailand U-23

- Sea Games Gold Medal (1); 2017
