= Daisuke Sakai =

Japanese footballer

Daisuke Sakai 坂井 大将
Personal information
- Full name: Daisuke Sakai
- Date of birth: 18 January 1997 (age 29)
- Place of birth: Nagasaki, Japan
- Height: 1.67 m (5 ft 6 in)
- Positions: Winger; attacking midfielder

Team information
- Current team: Young Lions (on loan from PSM Makassar)
- Number: 10

Youth career
- Oita Trinita

Senior career*
Years	Team	Apps	(Gls)
2014–2020	Oita Trinita	19	(0)
2015	→ J.League U-22 (loan)	8	(0)
2017–2018	→ Tubize (loan)	3	(0)
2018	→ Albirex Niigata (loan)	8	(0)
2019	→ Thespa Gunma (loan)	5	(1)
2020	→ Gainare Tottori (loan)	27	(6)
2021–2022	Samut Prakan City	28	(4)
2022–2023	Customs United	37	(10)
2023–2024	Kerala Blasters	21	(3)
2024–	PSM Makassar	46	(4)
2026–	→ Young Lions (loan)	2	(0)

International career
2013	Japan U17	4	(1)
2014–2016	Japan U19	8	(0)
2017	Japan U20	2	(0)
Medal record
Men's football
Representing Japan
AFC U-19 Championship
Winner	2016 Bahrain
- * Club domestic league appearances and goals as of 19 September 2026

Daisuke Sakai (坂井 大将, Sakai Daisuke; born 18 January 1997) is a Japanese professional footballer who plays as a winger or attacking midfielder for Singapore Premier League club Young Lions, on loan from Indonesian club PSM Makassar.

== Club career ==
=== Youth and early career ===
==== Oita Trinita: Several loan spells ====
Sakai spent his youth career at Oita Trinita. After coming up through various ranks, he was promoted into senior team of the club in 2014. He spent loan spells at different clubs including the Japanese clubs Albirex Niigata, Thespakusatsu Gunma, Gainare Tottori and the Belgian side Tubize.

=== Samut Prakan Citya ===
In June 2021, Sakai ended his six-year association with Oita Trinita and signed for the Thai League 1 club Samut Prakan City. He made 28 appearances for the club in the league and scored 4 goals.

=== Customs United ===
In July 2022, Sakai signed for the Thai League 2 club Customs United. He played in 37 games and scored 10 goals.

=== Kerala Blasters ===
On 2 September 2023, Indian Super League club Kerala Blasters announced the signing of Sakai. With this move, he became the first Japanese player to sign with the club. Sakai made his debut for the club on 21 September, in the season opener against Bengaluru at home, which the Blasters won 2–1. He provided his first assist for the club on 27 October against Odisha and helped in a 2–1 victory. On 4 November, Sakai scored his debut goal for the Blasters during the match against East Bengal in the 32nd minute and helped them in 1–2 victory away from home.

== International career ==
In October 2013, Sakai was elected Japan U-17 national team for 2013 U-17 World Cup. He played all 4 matches and scored a goal against Tunisia. In May 2017, he was elected Japan U-20 national team for 2017 U-20 World Cup. At this tournament, he played 2 matches as defensive midfielder.

== Career statistics ==
=== Club ===
As of match played 19 September 2026

Appearances and goals by club, season and competition
Club	Season	League			National cup (Note: Includes Emperor's Cup, Thai FA Cup)		Continental		Other		Total	
Club	Season	Division	Apps	Goals	Apps	Goals	Apps	Goals	Apps	Goal	Apps	Goals
Oita Trinita	2014	J2 League	0	0	1	1	—		—		1	1
Oita Trinita	2015	J2 League	4	0	2	0	—		—		6	0
Oita Trinita	2016	J3 League	11	0	2	0	—		—		13	0
Oita Trinita	2017	J2 League	4	0	2	1	—		—		6	1
Oita Trinita	Total		19	0	7	2	—		—		26	2
J.League U-22 (loan)	2015	J3 League	8	0	0	0	—		—		8	0
Tubize (loan)	2017–2018	Belgian First Division B	3	0	0	0	—		—		3	0
Albirex Niigata (loan)	2018	J2 League	8	0	2	1	—		2 (Note: Appearance(s) in J.League Cup)	0	12	1
Thespa Gunma (loan)	2019	J3 League	5	0	0	0	—		—		5	0
Gainare Tottori (loan)	2020	J3 League	27	6	0	0	—		—		27	6
Samut Prakan City	2021–22	Thai League 1	28	4	2	0	—		—		30	4
Customs United	2022–23	Thai League 2	37	10	1	0	—		—		38	10
Kerala Blasters	2023–24	Indian Super League	21	3	—		—		—		21	3
PSM Makassar	2024–25	Liga 1	29	3	—		—		5 (Note: Appearances in ASEAN Club Championship)	1	34	4
PSM Makassar	2025–26	Super League	17	1	—		—		0	0	17	1
Young Lions (loan)	2026–27	Singapore Premier League	2	0	0	0	—		—		2	0
Career total			204	27	12	3	—		7	1	223	31

== Honours ==
Japan U19

- AFC U-19 Championship: 2016
