= Jiraaut Wingwon =

Thai footballer

Personal information
- Full name: Jiraaut Wingwon
- Date of birth: 12 December 2000 (age 25)
- Place of birth: Ratchaburi, Thailand
- Height: 1.75 m (5 ft 9 in)
- Position: Winger

Team information
- Current team: Trat

Youth career
- 2015–2018: Rajdamnern Commercial College

Senior career*
Years	Team	Apps	(Gls)
2018	Samutsongkhram	8	(0)
2019	Muangnont Bankunmae	12	(3)
2020–2022	Samut Prakan City	23	(1)
2022	Songkhla	10	(0)
2023–2024	Samut Prakan City	17	(0)
2024–2025	Lopburi City	20	(4)
2025–	Trat	0	(0)
- * Club domestic league appearances and goals as of 30 March 2025

Jiraaut Wingwon (Thai: จิรอัชต์ วิงวอน, born 12 December 2000) is a Thai professional footballer who plays as a winger for Thai League 2 club Trat.

== Honours ==
=== Club ===
Songkhla

- Thai League 3 Southern Region: 2022–23
