= Kritsana Daokrajai =

Thai professional footballer

Personal information
- Full name: Kritsana Daokrajai
- Date of birth: 13 March 2001 (age 25)
- Place of birth: Surin, Thailand
- Height: 1.84 m (6 ft 1/2 in)
- Position: Centre back

Team information
- Current team: Angthong
- Number: 50

Youth career
- 2008–2013: Banchomphra School
- 2013–2014: Mueansri Sports School
- 2014–2015: Suan Pa Khao Cha-ang School
- 2015–2020: Buriram United

Senior career*
Years	Team	Apps	(Gls)
2020–2026	Buriram United	0	(0)
2020	→ Angthong (loan)	2	(0)
2021	→ Uthai Thani (loan)	7	(0)
2021–2022	→ Khon Kaen (loan)	28	(1)
2022–2023	→ Kasetsart (loan)	27	(0)
2024	→ Phrae United (loan)	9	(0)
2024–2025	→ Nakhon Si United (loan)	8	(0)
2025–2026	→ Kasetsart (loan)	23	(0)
2026–	Angthong	0	(0)

International career
2018	Thailand U17	4	(0)
2018–2019	Thailand U19	11	(1)
- * Club domestic league appearances and goals as of 26 April 2025

Kritsana Daokrajai (Thai: กฤษณะ ดาวกระจาย, born 13 March 2001) is a Thai professional footballer who plays as a centre back for Thai League 3 club Angthong.

== Club career ==
=== Buriram United ===
He made the team for 2018 season, after spending time in their junior team at Buriram United Academy. He played in Buriram United's U15 team and helped winning U15 Thailand Youth League 2015 by scoring a free kick in the championship game. He played in their U19 team in U19 competition Coke Cup 2017, won the lower northeast region and later the national level.

He played in 2018 Thailand Champions Cup. He also made the team that compete in 2018 AFC Champions League.

=== Angthong ===
In 2020, Kritsana played on loan for Angthong in the Thai League 3.

=== Khon Kaen ===
In 2021, Kritsana played on loan for Khon Kaen in the Thai League 2.

== International Goals ==
=== U19 ===
Kritsana Daokrajai – goals for Thailand U19
#	Date	Venue	Opponent	Score	Result	Competition
1.	30 May 2018	Nonthaburi, Thailand	Malaysia	1–0	2–0	Friendly

== Honours ==
=== Club ===
Buriram United

- Thai League 1 (1): 2018
