= Ibson Melo =

Brazilian footballer (born 1989)

Personal information
- Full name: Ibson Pereira de Melo
- Date of birth: 8 October 1989 (age 37)
- Place of birth: Recife, Brazil
- Height: 1.79 m (5 ft 10 in)
- Position: Forward

Team information
- Current team: Mahasarakham SBT
- Number: 71

Senior career*
Years	Team	Apps	(Gls)
2014	ACD Potiguar	2	(0)
2014–2015	Ethnikos Achna	25	(2)
2015	Ayia Napa	16	(1)
2015–2016	Pafos	19	(1)
2016–2017	Ermis Aradippou	36	(7)
2017–2018	Marítimo	15	(1)
2019	Samut Prakan City	29	(15)
2020–2021	Sukhothai	27	(10)
2021–2023	Khon Kaen United	54	(22)
2023	NorthEast United	9	(1)
2024	Clube Sociedade Esportiva	15	(5)
2024–	Mahasarakham SBT	0	(0)
- * Club domestic league appearances and goals as of 18 December 2024 (UTC)

Ibson Pereira de Melo (born 8 October 1989) is a Brazilian professional footballer who plays as a forward.

== Career ==
On 28 June 2017, Ibson signed a two-year contract with Marítimo.

On 7 July 2023, Ibson joined Indian Super League club NorthEast United on a one-year deal.
