= Yasushi Yoshida =

Japanese footballer and manager

Yasushi Yoshida 吉田 靖
Personal information
- Full name: Yasushi Yoshida
- Date of birth: August 9, 1960 (age 66)
- Place of birth: Nerima, Tokyo, Japan
- Height: 1.74 m (5 ft 8 1/2 in)
- Position: Forward

Youth career
- 1976–1978: Kokugakuin Kugayama High School
- 1979–1982: Waseda University

Senior career*
Years	Team	Apps	(Gls)
1983–1992	Mitsubishi Motors	175	(35)
Total		175	(35)

Managerial career
- 1999: Urawa Reds
- 2005–2007: Japan U20
- 2011–2012: Japan U20
- 2013: Roasso Kumamoto
- 2013–2016: Urawa Reds Ladies
- 2021–2022: Samut Prakan City
- * Club domestic league appearances and goals

Yasushi Yoshida (吉田 靖, Yoshida Yasushi; born August 9, 1960) is a former Japanese football player and manager.

== Playing career ==
Yoshida was born in Nerima, Tokyo, on August 9, 1960. After graduating from Waseda University, he played for Mitsubishi Motors (currently Urawa Reds) from 1983 to 1992. He played 175 games and scored 35 goals at the club.

== Coaching career ==
After retirement, Yoshida started his coaching career at Urawa Reds from 1992. He mainly coached as an assistant coach at the club until 2000. In December 1999, he also managed the club at 1999 Emperor's Cup. In 2001, he became an assistant coach for Japan U-20 national team. Japan team participated in 2003 and 2005 World Youth Championship. In 2005, he became a manager for the Japan U-20 team and participated in 2007 U-20 World Cup. In 2011, he became a manager for Japan U-20 team again. In 2013, he signed with Roasso Kumamoto but resigned in July. In September, he became a manager for the Urawa Reds Ladies. He resigned at the end of the 2016 season.

On 11 December 2021, Yoshida was named the head coach of Thai League 1 club Samut Prakan City.

== Career statistics ==
Appearances and goals by club, season and competition
Club	Season	League			Emperor's Cup		J.League Cup		Total	
Club	Season	Division	Apps	Goals	Apps	Goals	Apps	Goals	Apps	Goals
Mitsubishi Motors	1983	JSL Division 1								
Mitsubishi Motors	1984	JSL Division 1								
Mitsubishi Motors	1985–86	JSL Division 1								
Mitsubishi Motors	1986–87	JSL Division 1								
Mitsubishi Motors	1987–88	JSL Division 1								
Mitsubishi Motors	1988–89	JSL Division 1								
Mitsubishi Motors	1989–90	JSL Division 2	29	11			1	0	30	11
Mitsubishi Motors	1990–91	JSL Division 1	20	1			1	0	21	1
Mitsubishi Motors	1991–92	JSL Division 1	12	1			0	0	12	1
Career total			61	13	0	0	2	0	63	13

== Managerial statistics ==
As of match played 4 May 2022

Team	From	To	Record				
Team	From	To	G	W	D	L	Win %
Roasso Kumamoto	2013	2013	23	5	7	11	21.74
Samut Prakran City	2021	2022	18	4	6	8	22.22
Total			41	9	13	19	21.95

^{1} A win or loss by penalty shoot-out is counted as a draw.
