= Yuto Ono =

Japanese footballer

Yuto Ono 小野 悠斗
Personal information
- Full name: Yuto Ono
- Date of birth: 28 September 1991 (age 35)
- Place of birth: Yokosuka, Kanagawa, Japan
- Height: 1.70 m (5 ft 7 in)
- Position: Midfielder

Youth career
- 2009: Yokohama F. Marinos
- 2010–2011: Club Necaxa

Senior career*
Years	Team	Apps	(Gls)
2011–2012	Celaya F.C.	39	(8)
2013	C.D. Veracruz	13	(2)
2013–2014	Atlético San Luis	30	(2)
2015–2019	FC Gifu	94	(4)
2020–2022	Samut Prakan City	50	(2)
2022–2023	Chiangmai United	34	(2)
- * Club domestic league appearances and goals as of 12 May 2023

Yuto Ono (小野 悠斗, Ono Yuto; born 28 September 1991 in Yokosuka, Kanagawa) is a Japanese football player.

His younger brother Yuji is also a professional footballer currently playing for Gamba Osaka.

== Club statistics ==
Updated to 18 February 2021.

Club			League		National Cup		Total	
Club	Season	League	Apps	Goals	Apps	Goals	Apps	Goals
Mexico			League		Copa MX		Total	
Celaya F.C.	2011–12	Ascenso MX	25	6	0	0	25	6
Celaya F.C.	2012–13	Ascenso MX	14	2	4	0	18	2
Celaya F.C.	Total		39	8	4	0	43	8
C.D. Veracruz	2012–13	Ascenso MX	13	2	1	0	14	2
Atlético San Luis	2013-14	Ascenso MX	25	2	5	0	30	2
Japan			League		Emperor's Cup		Total	
FC Gifu	2015	J2 League	14	0	2	0	16	0
FC Gifu	2016	J2 League	15	0	0	0	15	0
FC Gifu	2017	J2 League	30	2	2	1	32	3
FC Gifu	2018	J2 League	28	2	1	0	29	2
FC Gifu	2019	J2 League	7	0	0	0	7	0
FC Gifu	Total		94	4	5	1	99	5
Thailand			League		Thai FA Cup		Total	
Samut Prakan City	2020–21	Thai League	16	1	2	0	18	1
Career total			187	17	17	1	204	18
