= Samuel Rosa (footballer) =

Brazilian footballer (born 1991)

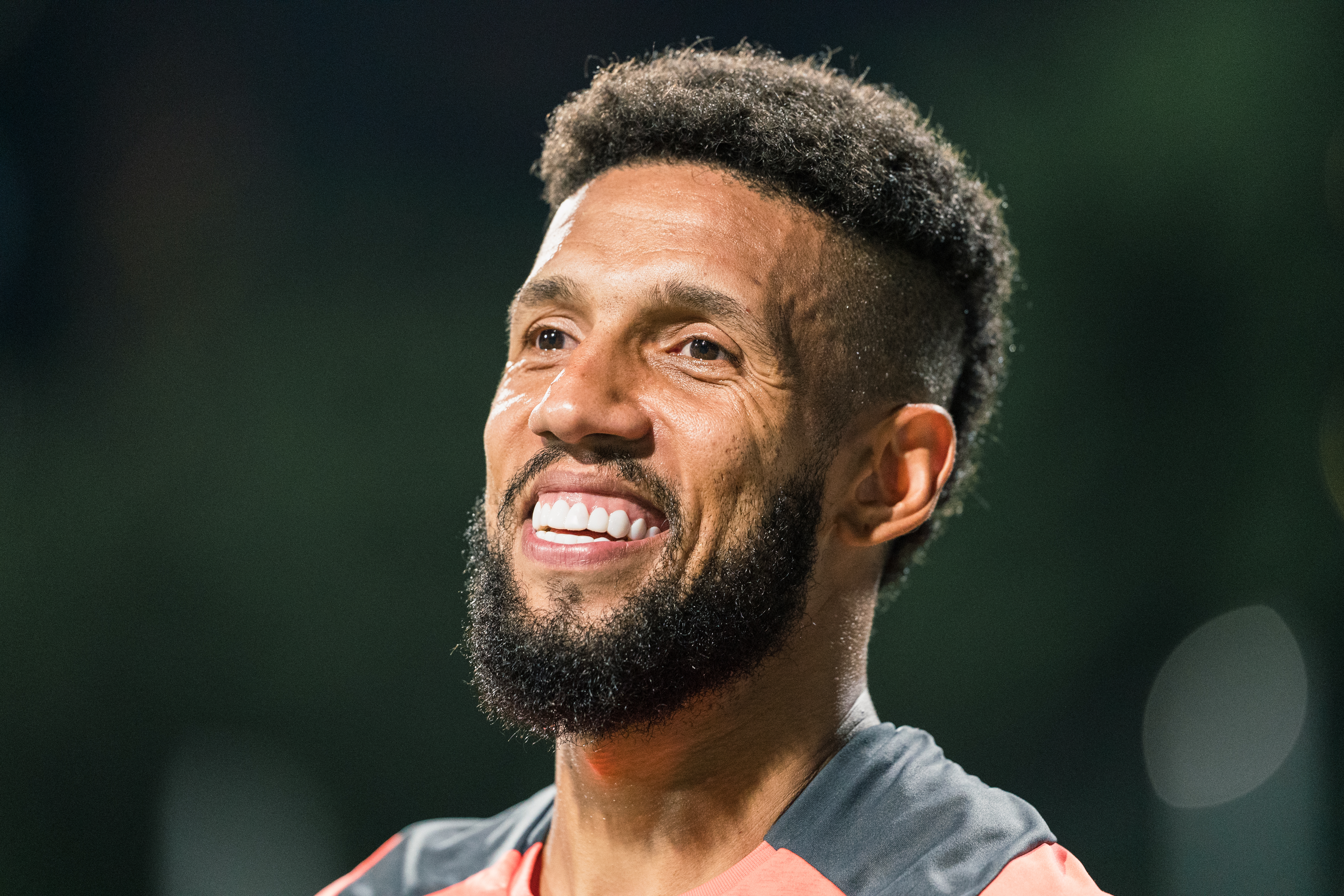
- Samuel Rosa in 2024

Personal information
- Full name: Samuel Rosa Gonçalves
- Date of birth: 25 February 1991 (age 35)
- Place of birth: São Borja, Brazil
- Height: 1.86 m (6 ft 1 in)
- Position: Forward

Team information
- Current team: Hatta
- Number: 31

Youth career
- 2009: São José
- 2010–2011: Internacional
- 2011–2012: Fluminense

Senior career*
Years	Team	Apps	(Gls)
2012–2017	Fluminense	57	(9)
2014	→ LA Galaxy (loan)	8	(0)
2014	→ Goiás (loan)	20	(2)
2015	→ Sport (loan)	17	(0)
2016	→ Ferroviária (loan)	13	(2)
2016–2017	→ Hatta (loan)	23	(10)
2017–2018	Hatta	21	(11)
2018–2020	Al Nasr SC	9	(1)
2019	→ Al-Fujairah (loan)	13	(1)
2019	→ Jeonbuk Hyundai Motors (loan)	11	(4)
2020	→ Hatta Club (loan)	6	(1)
2020–2022	Buriram United	26	(11)
2021–2022	→ Samut Prakan City (loan)	13	(2)
2022–2024	PT Prachuap	58	(26)
2024–2025	Lee Man	22	(6)
2025–	Hatta		
- * Club domestic league appearances and goals as of 25 May 2025

Samuel Rosa Gonçalves (born 25 February 1991) is a Brazilian professional footballer who plays for Hatta as a forward.

== Club career ==
Samuel began his youth career with São José. He was discovered by Internacional and joined the club in 2010.

In April 2011, Samuel transferred to Fluminense. He made his professional debut for Fluminense during the 2012 Campeonato Brasileiro Série A and scored five goals in 23 league appearances as the club won its fourth national title. That same year he made five appearances in the 2012 Campeonato Carioca, helping the club to that title, the club's 31st state championship. The following season Samuel made 45 appearances in all competitions scoring 9 goals, which included 8 matches during the Copa Libertadores. Samuel was close to joining La Liga's Espanyol during the 2013 summer transfer period, however, Fluminense was not able to reach a deal with the Spanish side.

In January 2014, Samuel was acquired on loan by Major League Soccer club Los Angeles Galaxy. On 12 March 2014, Samuel scored his first goal for Galaxy at home against Mexican side Club Tijuana in the first leg of a CONCACAF Champions League tie, Samuel's effort proved to be the only goal as Galaxy defeated the Xolos 1–0. On 10 July 2014, LA Galaxy terminated Samuel's loan agreement.

On 14 July 2024, Samuel joined Hong Kong Premier League club Lee Man.
