= Kevin Ingreso =

Filipino footballer (born 1993)

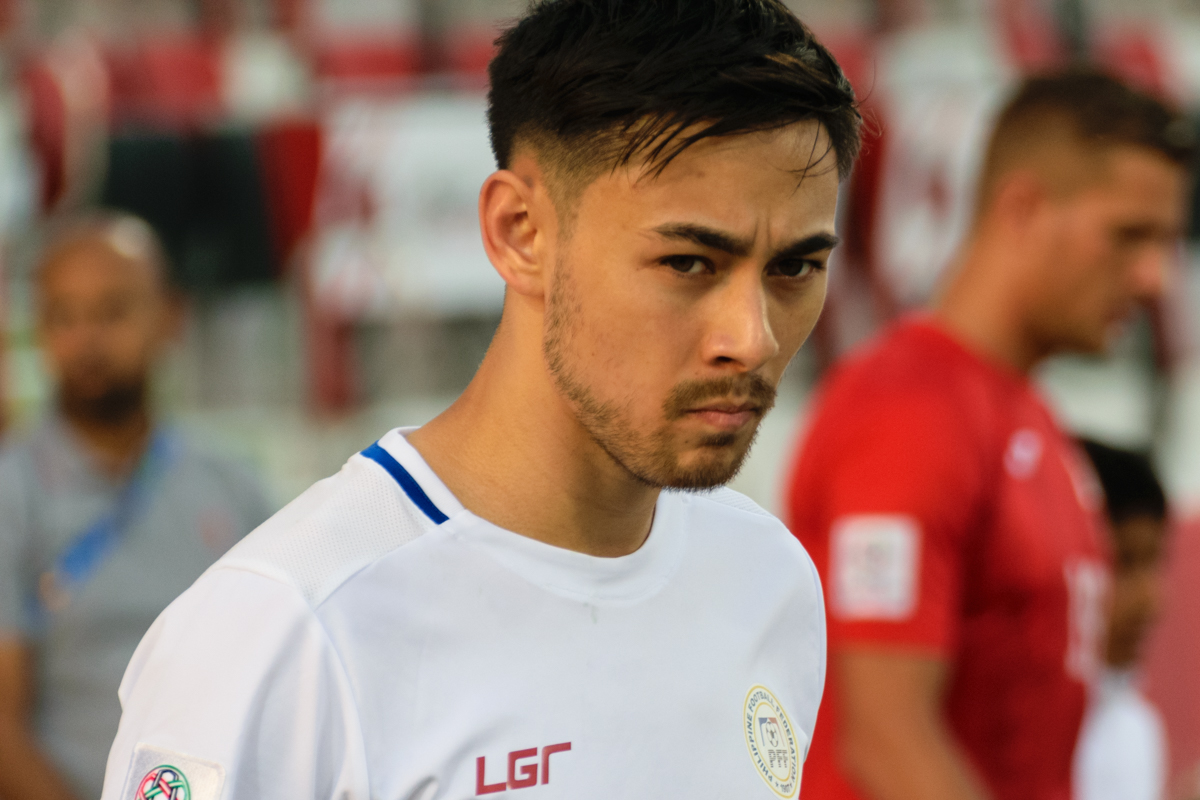
- Ingreso playing for Philippines at the 2019 Asian Cup

Personal information
- Full name: Kevin Langbehn Ingreso
- Date of birth: 10 February 1993 (age 33)
- Place of birth: Hamburg, Germany
- Height: 1.78 m (5 ft 10 in)
- Position: Midfielder

Team information
- Current team: SV Drochtersen/Assel
- Number: 18

Youth career
- TSV Wandsetal
- SC Concordia von 1907
- MSV Hamburg
- –2007: FC St. Pauli
- 2007–2011: Hamburger SV

Senior career*
Years	Team	Apps	(Gls)
2011–2013	Hamburger SV II	28	(1)
2013–2015	VfR Neumünster	63	(3)
2015	SV Drochtersen/Assel	11	(2)
2015–2019	Ceres–Negros	38	(8)
2019–2021	Buriram United	34	(3)
2021–2022	BG Pathum United	10	(0)
2022	→ Samut Prakan City (loan)	11	(0)
2022	→ Sri Pahang (loan)	13	(0)
2023	Sri Pahang	18	(2)
2024	One Taguig	11	(1)
2024–2025	Altona 93	2	(1)
2025–	SV Drochtersen/Assel II	28	(5)
2026–	SV Drochtersen/Assel	5	(0)

International career^{‡}
2008	Germany U15	1	(0)
2015–2024	Philippines	45	(5)
- * Club domestic league appearances and goals as of 22 September 2026 ‡ National team caps and goals as of 16:22; 6 June 2024

Kevin Langbehn Ingreso (born 10 February 1993) is a professional footballer who plays as a midfielder for Regionalliga Nord side SV Drochtersen/Assel. Born in Germany, he represented the Philippines at international level.

== Club career ==
=== Ceres–Negros ===
In December 2015, Ingreso signed a contract for United Football League club Ceres–Negros. He remained with the club when it joined the Philippines Football League in 2017.

=== Buriram United ===
On 19 June 2019, Ingreso signed for Thai League 1 club, Buriram United.

=== BG Pathum United ===
On 1 June 2021, he joined rival BG Pathum United.

==== Samut Prakan City (loan) ====
After featuring in just 10 league matches for BG Pathum United, Ingreso was loaned to Samut Prakan City for the rest of 2021/2022 season. However, his appearance in 11 outings for the club could not help the team to come out from the relegation zone. He returned to his parent club at the end of the season.

=== Sri Pahang FC ===
Ingreso joined Malaysia Super League side Sri Pahang on a six-month loan deal. The club later announced that his contract has been extended for 2023 season.

== International career ==
Ingreso was called up for the national team's 2018 FIFA World Cup qualifier matches against Bahrain and Yemen scheduled on June 11 and 16 respectively. He was not subbed in at the Bahrain match but made his first international debut after being subbed in at the Yemen match, replacing Iain Ramsay at the 90th minute.

Ingreso played in the Philippines' 2–1 win over Tajikistan on March 27, 2018, which led to the national qualifying for the 2019 AFC Asian Cup. While he committed a foul which led to Tajik player Akhtam Nazarov scoring a goal through a penalty kick, he also scored the equalizer in the match by hitting the ball with his head.

=== International Goals ===
Scores and results list the Philippines' goal tally first.

#	Date	Venue	Opponent	Score	Result	Competition
2016
1.	6 September	Dolen Omurzakov Stadium, Bishkek	Kyrgyzstan	1–0	2–1	Friendly
2018
2.	22 March	Rizal Memorial Stadium, Manila	Fiji	3–0	3–2	Friendly
3.	27 March	Rizal Memorial Stadium, Manila	Tajikistan	1–1	2–1	2019 AFC Asian Cup qualification
2021
4.	11 December	National Stadium, Kallang	Timor-Leste	7–0	7–0	
2024
5.	6 June	Mỹ Đình National Stadium, Hanoi	Vietnam	2–2	2–3	2026 FIFA World Cup qualification

== Personal life ==
Kevin Ingreso's father is Dennis Ingreso, who traces his roots to Manila, Philippines and his mother is German. On 20 August 2020, Kevin married Carla Regin Lopez.

== Honours ==
BG Pathum United

- Thailand Champions Cup: 2021
