= Masatada Ishii =

Japanese footballer and manager

Masatada Ishii 石井 正忠
Personal information
- Full name: Masatada Ishii
- Date of birth: 1 February 1967 (age 59)
- Place of birth: Ichihara, Japan
- Height: 1.76 m (5 ft 9 1/2 in)
- Position: Midfielder

Team information
- Current team: Japan (assistant)

Youth career
- 1982–1984: Ichihara Midori High School

College career
Years	Team	Apps	(Gls)
1985–1988	Juntendo University		

Senior career*
Years	Team	Apps	(Gls)
1989–1991	NTT Kanto	43	(0)
1991–1997	Kashima Antlers	109	(3)
1998	Avispa Fukuoka	1	(0)
Total		153	(3)

Managerial career
- 2002–2012: Kashima Antlers (fitness coach)
- 2012–2015: Kashima Antlers (assistant)
- 2015–2017: Kashima Antlers
- 2017–2019: Omiya Ardija
- 2019–2021: Samut Prakan City
- 2021–2023: Buriram United
- 2023: Thailand (technical director)
- 2023–2025: Thailand U23 (advisor)
- 2023–2025: Thailand
- 2025–2026: BG Pathum United
- 2026–: Japan (assistant)
Medal record
Kashima Antlers
Winner	J1 League	1996
Runner-up	J1 League	1993
Runner-up	J1 League	1997
Winner	J.League Cup	1997
Winner	Emperor's Cup	1997
Runner-up	Emperor's Cup	1993
Thailand
Runner-up	ASEAN Championship	2024
- * Club domestic league appearances and goals

Masatada Ishii (石井 正忠, Ishii Masatada; born 1 February 1967) is a Japanese professional football manager and former player who played as a midfielder, he is the currently assistant coach for Japan women's national football team.

== Playing career ==
Ishii was born in Ichihara on 1 February 1967. After graduating from Juntendo University, he joined Japan Soccer League club NTT Kanto in 1989. He played many matches from first season. He moved to Sumitomo Metal (later Kashima Antlers) in 1991. In 1992, Japan Soccer League was folded and a new league, J1 League, was founded. In 1993, the club won the 2nd place J1 League and Emperor's Cup. However he could hardly play any matches from 1996. He moved to Avispa Fukuoka in 1998. He retired at the end of the 1998 season.

== Managerial career ==
=== Kashima Antlers ===
After retirement, Ishii became a coach for Kashima Antlers in 1999. He served mainly as a fitness coach for the team until 2012 where he serve as the assistant manager under Toninho Cerezo. In July 2015, manager Toninho Cerezo was sacked and Ishii replaced him as manager. He was the first Japanese manager of the club for the first time in 21 years since Masakatsu Miyamoto in 1994 (except caretaker Takashi Sekizuka in 1998 and 1999). In October, the club won the champions 2015 J.League Cup. In 2016, the club won the champions J1 League and qualify for 2016 Club World Cup. He was also elected J.League Manager of the Year. At Club World Cup, the club became the first Asian team to reach the Club World Cup final. In the final, after a 2–2 draw against European champions Real Madrid after 90 minutes, they were beaten 4–2 after extra time. However the club performance is bad in 2017, he was sacked in May 2017.

=== Omiya Ardija ===
In November in late in 2017 season, Ishii signed with Omiya Ardija (former NTT Kanto) where he began his playing career. Although he managed 3 matches, the club could not win the matches and was relegated to J2 League. He remained a manager in 2018 season and aimed to return to J1 League. However Ardija finished at 5th place in 2018 season and missed promotion to J1. He resigned at end of the 2018 season.

=== Samut Prakan City ===
On 23 December 2019, Ishii was named the head coach of Thai League 1 club Samut Prakan City.

=== Buriram United ===
==== 2021–22: Domestic treble ====
On 1 December 2021, Ishii was appointed head coach of Buriram United. In 2022, the club won the champions 2021–22 Thai League 1 and qualify for 2023–24 AFC Champions League group stage. During the 2021–22 season, Ishii successfully guided Buriram United to win the Thai League 1, Thai FA Cup and Thai League Cup, thus completing the domestic treble for the fourth time in the club’s history.

==== 2022–23: Domestic treble for two consecutive seasons ====
The season ended with Ishii winning the first 'Double Treble' (a treble in two consecutive seasons) in Thai football history with a 2–0 Thai FA Cup Final win over Bangkok United on 28 May 2023, thus completing the domestic treble for the fifth time in the club’s history.

=== Thailand ===
On 22 November 2023, Nualphan Lamsam, team manager of Thailand national team appointed Masatada Ishii to be the new head coach of Thailand national team. Ishii replaced Alexandré Pölking who was sacked earlier. Ishii became the second Japanese head coach of Thailand, following Akira Nishino, who served for two years from July 2019. On 21 October 2025, the Football Association of Thailand (FAT) announced the departure of Masatada Ishii from his position as head coach of the Thailand national team. The decision followed an internal review by the association's technical committee, which concluded that Ishii's coaching approach and team development plans did not align with association's direction. During his tenure, which began in December 2023, Ishii recorded 16 wins from 30 matches in total, equivalent 53% win rate.

=== BG Pathum United ===
On 30 October 2025, Ishii was appointed head coach of Thai League 1 club BG Pathum United. On 2 November 2025, Ishii managed his first match with BG Pathum United in a 2–1 away win against Chonburi.

== Management style ==
=== Tactic ===
Based on 4-4-2 formation, it is characterized by aggressive tactics that use high press and short counter to break through the center. During his time at Omiya Ardija, he made good use of Genki Omae, who had a lack of scoring ability and was unsuccessful in the previous year, leading him to the league's top scorer.

== Career statistics ==
Appearances and goals by club, season and competition
Club	Season	League			Emperor's Cup		J.League Cup		Total	
Club	Season	Division	Apps	Goals	Apps	Goals	Apps	Goals	Apps	Goals
NTT Kanto	1989–90	JSL Division 2	19	0			1	0	20	0
NTT Kanto	1990–91	JSL Division 2	24	0			2	0	26	0
Sumitomo Metal	1991–92	JSL Division 2	15	0			2	0	17	0
Kashima Antlers	1992	J1 League	-		2	0	6	0	8	0
Kashima Antlers	1993	J1 League	22	2	1	0	5	0	28	2
Kashima Antlers	1994	J1 League	30	1	1	0	1	0	32	1
Kashima Antlers	1995	J1 League	30	0	3	0	-		33	0
Kashima Antlers	1996	J1 League	1	0	0	0	10	1	11	1
Kashima Antlers	1997	J1 League	11	0	0	0	5	0	16	0
Avispa Fukuoka	1998	J1 League	1	0	0	0	0	0	1	0
Career total			153	3	7	0	32	1	192	4

== Managerial statistics ==
As of 6 February 2026

Managerial record by team and tenure
Team	Nat.	From	To	Record					Ref.
Team	Nat.	From	To	G	W	D	L	Win %	Ref.
Kashima Antlers	(Japan)	23 July 2015	31 May 2017	96	59	7	30	61.46	
Omiya Ardija	(Japan)	6 November 2017	28 November 2018	48	22	9	17	45.83	
Samut Prakan City	(Thailand)	23 December 2019	30 November 2021	50	21	10	19	42.00	
Buriram United	(Thailand)	1 December 2021	6 August 2023	68	52	9	7	76.47	
Thailand	(Thailand)	12 December 2023	21 October 2025	30	16	6	8	53.33	
BG Pathum United	(Thailand)	30 October 2025	6 February 2026	20	10	5	5	50.00	
Career Total				312	180	46	86	57.69	

== Honours ==
=== Player ===
Kashima Antlers

- J.League: 1996
- Emperor's Cup: 1997
- J.League Cup: 1997

=== Manager ===
Kashima Antlers

- J1 League: 2016
- Emperor's Cup: 2016
- J.League Cup: 2015
- Japanese Super Cup: 2017
- FIFA Club World Cup runner-up: 2016

Buriram United

- Thai League 1: 2021–22, 2022–23
- Thai FA Cup: 2021–22, 2022–23
- Thai League Cup: 2021–22, 2022–23
- Thailand Champions Cup runner-up: 2022, 2023

Thailand

- King's Cup: 2024
- ASEAN Championship runner-up: 2024

Individual

- J.League Manager of the Year: 2016
- Thai League 1 Coach of the Year: 2021–22, 2022–23
- Thai League 1 Coach of the Month: December 2020, January 2022, November 2022, January 2023, February 2023
