= Samut Prakan City F.C. =

Thai football club

Samut Prakan City สมุทรปราการ ซิตี้
- Full name: Samut Prakan City Football Club สโมสรฟุตบอลสมุทรปราการ ซิตี้
- Nicknames: The Oceans Fang (เขี้ยวสมุทร)
- Short name: SPC
- Founded: 1989, as Coke Bangpra Football Club; 2008, as Pattaya United; 2019, as Samut Prakan City
- Dissolved: 2025
- Ground: Lad Krabang 54 Stadium; Samut Prakan, Thailand
- Capacity: 3,500
Home colours	Away colours	Third colours

Samut Prakan City Football Club (Thai: สโมสรฟุตบอลสมุทรปราการ ซิตี้) was a Thai defunct football club based in Samut Prakan, Thailand. The club last played in Thai League 2. It was renamed from Pattaya United in 2019, following the owner's decision to rename the club and relocate it to Samut Prakan. Due to financial problems, the club decided to disband in 2025.

== History ==
=== Foundation ===
The club was founded at the end of the 2018 season after Tanet Phanichewa, owner of Pattaya United, decided to rename the club to Samut Prakan City and relocate it to Samut Prakan Province. In their first season, the club competed in the 2019 Thai League 1.

=== Beginnings in the Thai League 1 and Japanese-Thai connection ===
Prior to the 2019 season, The club appointed Tetsuya Murayama as the club first Director of football, the work of Tetsuya Murayama in coordination with Coach Surapong Kongthep in the first season of the club in Thai league 1, the club performed quite well and finished in 6th place.

The club appointed Masatada Ishii as manager ahead of the 2020–21 Thai League 1 season by releasing Ibson Melo, Kim Pyung-rae, Baworn Tapla, Phumin Kaewta and Woranat Thongkruea. The club signing Tatsuya Sakai from Montedio Yamagata, Yuto Ono from FC Gifu and Brazilian striker Pedro Júnior.

The 2020–21 Thai League 1 season began with a 1–1 draw against Chiangrai United on 14 February 2020, followed up by three consecutive losses. The first win in the league came at the 5th matchday, where they won 1–0 against Rayong at the Samut Prakarn SAT Stadium. After the 10th matchday, the club stood at 12th place in the league.

After a series of disappointing results, The club won 3 matches in a row, winning 1–3 against Buriram United at the Chang Arena, winning Chonburi and Trat and the club climbed to 6th place after the first half of the season (Round 15).

Samut Prakan City advanced to the third round of the Thai FA Cup, being eliminated after losing 1–0 to Muangthong United at the SCG Stadium on 3 February 2021.

==== Dissolved ====
In January 2025, The Football Association of Thailand punished Samut Prakan City by banning them from the league and fining them 2 million baht. This is due to the team failing to register players and refusing to play in the second leg of the season. The FA Thailand cited the team's lack of communication and failure to comply with FIFA regulations.

== Stadium and locations by season records ==
Coordinates	Location	Stadium	Capacity	Year
13°21′52″N 100°58′35″E	Chonburi	Chonburi Municipality Stadium	8,680	2008
12°55′28″N 100°56′14″E	Chonburi	Nong Prue Stadium	7,000	2009–2010
13°24′41″N 100°59′37″E	Chonburi	IPE Chonburi Stadium	11,000	2011
12°55′28″N 100°56′14″E	Chonburi	Nong Prue Stadium	5,500	2012–2018
13°34′46″N 100°47′40″E	Samut Prakan	Samut Prakarn SAT Stadium (Keha Bang Phli)	5,100	2019–2024
13°42′22″N 100°47′02″E	Samut Prakan	Lad Krabang 54 Stadium	3,500	2024–2025

== Season-by-season records ==
Season	League									FA Cup	League Cup	Top scorer	
Season	Division	P	W	D	L	F	A	Pts	Pos	FA Cup	League Cup	Name	Goals
Coke Bangpra
2007	DIV 1	22	11	8	3	30	14	41	2nd				
Pattaya United
2008	TPL	30	8	11	11	24	27	35	11th			Tana Chanabut	4
2009	TPL	30	7	11	12	27	33	32	11th	R4	–	Anderson Machado	4
2010	TPL	30	12	9	9	43	38	45	6th	QF	QF	Ludovick Takam	17
2011	TPL	34	14	11	9	38	27	53	4th	R5	R2	O. J. Obatola	8
2012	TPL	34	9	10	15	35	47	37	15th	R3	R3	Kengne Ludovick	10
2013	TPL	32	9	2	21	39	66	29	17th	R3	R2	Rod Dyachenko	7
2014	DIV 1	34	12	5	17	42	53	41	14th	R2	R3	Cristiano Lopes	14
2015	DIV 1	38	18	11	9	77	40	65	2nd	R1	QF	Milan Bubalo	20
2016	TL	31	9	7	15	46	66	34	12th	R2	R3	Júnior Negrão	20
2017	T1	34	15	6	13	60	53	51	8th	R2	R2	Miloš Stojanović	15
2018	T1	34	13	7	14	50	62	46	8th	R2	R2	Lukian	18
Samut Prakan City
2019	T1	30	12	7	11	44	50	43	6th	R3	R2	Ibson Melo	15
2020–21	T1	30	14	5	11	58	51	47	6th	R3	–	Barros Tardeli	25
2021–22	T1	30	6	10	14	29	42	28	15th	R3	R2	Chayawat Srinawong	8
2022–23	T2	34	8	13	13	32	42	37	14th	R2	QF	Passakorn Sripudpong, Yotsakorn Burapha	7
2023–24	T2	34	8	11	15	39	57	35	15th	R2	R1	Fernando Viana	12
2024–25	Dissolved												

Champions	Runners-up	Third Place	Promoted	Relegated

- P = Played
- W = Games won
- D = Games drawn
- L = Games lost
- F = Goals for
- A = Goals against
- Pts = Points
- Pos = Final position
- T1 = Thai League 1
- QR1 = First Qualifying Round
- QR2 = Second Qualifying Round
- QR3 = Third Qualifying Round
- QR4 = Fourth Qualifying Round
- RInt = Intermediate Round
- R1 = Round 1
- R2 = Round 2
- R3 = Round 3
- R4 = Round 4
- R5 = Round 5
- R6 = Round 6
- GR = Group Stage
- QF = Quarter-finals
- SF = Semi-finals
- RU = Runners-up
- S = Shared
- W = Winners

== Coaches ==
Name	Nat	Period	Honours
Surapong Kongthep	(Thailand)	December 2018 – May 2019	
Tetsuya Murayama	(Japan)	June 2019 – October 2019	
Masatada Ishii	(Japan)	December 2019 – November 2021	
Yasushi Yoshida	(Japan)	December 2021 – July 2022	
Jukkapant Punpee	(Thailand)	July 2022 – January 2023	
Kritsakorn Kerdpol	(Thailand)	January 2023 – February 2023	
Tana Chanabut	(Thailand)	February 2023 – November 2023	
Vantawut Whangprasert	(Thailand)	November 2023 – December 2023	
Wanderley Junior	(Brazil)	December 2023 – March 2024	
Vantawut Whangprasert	(Thailand)	March 2024 – December 2024	
