= 2020–21 Buriram United F.C. season =

Buriram United
2020–21 season
- Chairman: Newin Chidchob
- Head coach: Bozidar Bandovic (until 19 October 2020); Alexandre Gama (from 22 October 2020)
- Stadium: Chang Arena
- Thai League: 2nd
- FA Cup: Semi-finals
- AFC Champions League: Play-off round
- Top goalscorer: League: Supachok Sarachat (10); All: Supachok Sarachat (13)
- Highest home attendance: 15,590; Buriram United 4–0 Chonburi (Thai League, 22 February 2020)
- Biggest win: Buriram United 9–0 Samutsongkhram (FA Cup, 7 November 2020)
- Biggest defeat: Shanghai SIPG 3–0 Buriram United (ACL qualifying play-offs, 28 January 2020)
Home colours	Away colours	Third colours

The 2020–21 season is Buriram United's 9th season in the Thai League. (11th if including P.E.A.'s two seasons) The club will enters the season as the Thai League runners-up, and will participate in the top-level league. They will also participate in the domestic cups, FA Cup, and continental cup, AFC Champions League, which they will start at preliminary round 2 for the first time since 2013 season.

This is Buriram's first season without Suchao Nuchnum, the club's former captain who played as midfielder, due to his announcement on November 26, 2019.

In the league, match 5–30 are postponed following the coronavirus outbreak.

== Club information ==
Owner	Newin Chidchob
Head Coach	(Montenegro) Božidar Bandović
Team Manager	(Thailand) Tadthep Pitakpoolsin
Assistant managers	(Serbia) Bojan Ofenbeher
Goalkeeping Coach	(Serbia) Zoran Mijanović
Conditioning Coach	(Serbia) Goran Basic
Physio	(Serbia) Dušan Nikolic
Head of Youth Development	(England) Andrew Ord
Ground (capacity and dimensions)	Chang Arena (32,600 / 4,046 m^{2})
Training Ground	Chang Training Ground, Buriram; Buriram Training Camp, Buriram; Buriram United Football Camp, Bang Bo, Samut Prakan

Source: on the table

== Squad information ==
As of 2 January 2020

Squad No.	Name	Nationality	Position(s)	Date of birth (age)	Transferred from	Since
Goalkeepers
1	Siwarak Tedsungnoen	(Thailand)	GK	20 April 1984 (age 42)	(Thailand) TOT S.C.	2010
29	Yotsapon Teangdar	(Thailand)	GK	6 April 1992 (age 34)	Youth academy	2011
60	Nattakit Nimnual	(Thailand)	GK	31 May 2002 (age 24)	Youth academy	2020
78	Ronnachart Phuchum	(Thailand)	GK	18 March 2002 (age 24)	Youth academy	2020
Defenders
3	Pansa Hemviboon	(Thailand)	DF	8 July 1990 (age 36)	(Thailand) Khon Kaen United	2016
4	Piyaphon Phanichakul	(Thailand)	DF	8 November 1987 (age 38)	(Thailand) Chiangrai United	2020
6	Tinnakorn Asurin	(Thailand)	DF	19 February 1990 (age 36)	(Thailand) Suphanburi	2020
11	Korrakot Wiriyaudomsiri	(Thailand)	DF	19 March 1988 (age 38)	(Thailand) Chonburi F.C.	2016
14	Chitipat Tanklang	(Thailand)	DF	11 August 1991 (age 35)	Youth academy	2012
15	Narubadin Weerawatnodom	(Thailand)	DF	12 July 1994 (age 32)	(Thailand) Police Tero F.C.	2015
18	Apiwat Ngaolamhin	(Thailand)	DF	1 June 1986 (age 40)	(Thailand) Ratchaburi Mitr Phol F.C.	2018
26	Digão	(Brazil)	DF	7 May 1988 (age 38)	(Brazil) Fluminense FC	2020
Midfielders
2	Sasalak Haiprakhon	(Thailand)	MF	8 January 1996 (age 30)	(Thailand) Bangkok United	2017
8	Ratthanakorn Maikami	(Thailand)	MF	1 January 1998 (age 28)	Youth academy	2016
10	Jakkaphan Kaewprom	(Thailand)	MF	24 May 1988 (age 38)	(Thailand) Muangthong United	2011
13	Brandon O'Neill	(Australia)	MF	12 April 1994 (age 32)	(South Korea) Pohang Steelers	2020
17	Chakkit Laptrakul	(Thailand)	MF	2 December 1994 (age 31)	(Thailand) Samut Prakan City	2020
19	Supachok Sarachat	(Thailand)	MF	22 May 1998 (age 28)	Youth academy	2015
22	Kevin Ingreso	(Philippines) (Germany)	MF	10 February 1993 (age 33)	(Philippines) Ceres–Negros	2019
	Apidet Janngam	(Thailand)	MF	10 March 2002 (age 24)	Youth academy	2020
Strikers
7	Maicon Marques	(Brazil)	FW	18 February 1990 (age 36)	(Brazil) Atlético Mineiro	2020
9	Supachai Jaided	(Thailand)	FW	1 December 1998 (age 27)	(Thailand) Super Power Samut Prakan	2016
38	Tommy Stevens	(Thailand) (England)	FW	15 March 2001 (age 25)	(England) Reading Academy	2019
54	Suphanat Mueanta	(Thailand)	FW	2 August 2002 (age 24)	Youth academy	2018
77	Aung Thu	(Myanmar)	FW	22 May 1995 (age 31)	(Myanmar) Yadanarbon F.C.	2020
91	Samuel Rosa Gonçalves	(Brazil)	FW	25 February 1991 (age 35)	(United Arab Emirates) Al Nasr	2020
	Pattara Soimalai	(Thailand)	FW	27 August 2001 (age 25)	Youth academy	2020

== Transfers ==
Transfer window	Date
1st leg (Winter)	11 November 2019 – 3 February 2020
Special (Summer)	25 August – 7 September 2020
2nd leg (Winter)	23 December 2020 – 5 January 2021

=== In ===
No.	Pos	Player	From	Fee	Date	Source
1st leg – Winter transfer
38	FW	(Thailand) (England) Tommy Stevens	(England) Reading Academy	Free transfer	15 September 2019	
	DF	(Thailand) Chinnawat Wongchai	(Thailand) PTT Rayong F.C.	Free transfer	15 December 2019	
6	MF	(South Korea) Jung Jae-yong	(South Korea) Pohang Steelers	Free transfer	18 December 2019	
21	FW	(Argentina) Bernardo Cuesta	(Peru) FBC Melgar	Free transfer	18 December 2019	
99	FW	(Brazil) Ricardo Bueno	(Brazil) Centro Sportivo Alagoano	Free transfer	18 December 2019	
2nd Leg – Summer transfer
44	FW	(Serbia) Marko Šćepović	(Turkey) Çaykur Rizespor	Undisclosed		
5	DF	(Croatia) Renato Kelić	(Croatia) HNK Cibalia	Undisclosed		
55	MF	(Uzbekistan) Akbar Ismatullaev	(Uzbekistan) PFK Metallurg Bekabad	Undisclosed		
26	MF	(Israel) Gidi Kanyuk	(Israel) Hapoel Haifa F.C.	Undisclosed		
	MF	(Thailand) (Norway) Havar Dahl	(Norway) Nardo FK	Undisclosed		
13	MF	(Australia) Brandon O'Neill	(South Korea) Pohang Steelers	Free		
77	FW	(Myanmar) Aung Thu	(Myanmar) Yadanarbon F.C.	Season loan		
91	FW	(Brazil) Samuel Rosa	(United Arab Emirates) Hatta Club	Free		
7	MF	(Brazil) Maicon	(Brazil) Clube Atlético Mineiro	Free		
	DF	(Brazil) Digão	(Brazil) Fluminense FC	Free		
4	DF	(Thailand) Piyaphon Phanichakul	(Thailand) Chiangrai United F.C.	Transfer		
6	DF	(Thailand) Tinnakorn Asurin	(Thailand) Suphanburi F.C.	Transfer		

=== Out ===
No.	Pos	Player	To	Fee	Date	Source
1st leg – Winter transfer
–	MF	(Thailand) Chitpanya Tisud	(Thailand) Ratchaburi Mitr Phol	Transfer		
–	GK	(Thailand) Nopphon Lakhonphon	(Thailand) Prachuap F.C.	Season loan		
–	GK	(Thailand) Kwanchai Suklom	(Thailand) Prachuap F.C.	Transfer	19 November 2019	
–	MF	(South Korea) Go Seul-ki	(Thailand) Port	Free transfer	30 November 2019	
8	MF	(Thailand) Suchao Nuchnum	(Thailand) Muangkan United	Transfer	30 November 2019	
–	DF	(Thailand) Peerawat Akkratum	(Thailand) PT Prachuap F.C.	Transfer	10 December 2019	
7	MF	(Japan) Hajime Hosogai	(Thailand) True Bangkok United	Season loan	12 December 2019	
	MF	(Thailand) Panyawat Nisangram	(Thailand) Bangkok F.C.	Season loan	30 November 2019	
	DF	(Thailand) Possawee Muanmart	(Thailand) Ubon Ratchathani F.C.	Season loan	30 November 2019	
	DF	(Thailand) Sarawut Munjit	(Thailand) Ubon Ratchathani F.C.	Season loan	30 November 2019	
	FW	(Thailand) Phongchana Kongkirit	(Thailand) Ubon Ratchathani F.C.	Season loan	30 November 2019	
27	DF	(Thailand) Nattapon Malapun	(Thailand) Samut Prakan City F.C.	Season loan	17 December 2019	
20	FW	(Sweden) Rasmus Jönsson	(Sweden) Helsingborgs IF	Free transfer	18 December 2019	
39	FW	(Netherlands) Nacer Barazite		Free transfer	18 December 2019	
	FW	(Thailand) Mehti Sarakham	(Thailand) Samut Prakan City F.C.	Undisclosed	23 December 2019	
20	FW	(Philippines) Javier Patiño	(Thailand) Ratchaburi FC	Undisclosed	30 November 2019	
6	MF	(South Korea) Jung Jae-yong	(South Korea) Suwon FC	Released	28 April 2020	
5	DF	(Venezuela) Andrés Túñez	(Thailand) BG Pathum United F.C.	Free	29 April 2020	
99	FW	(Brazil) Ricardo Bueno	(Brazil) Operário Ferroviário	Free transfer	15 May 2020	
2nd Leg – Summer transfer
21	FW	(Argentina) Bernardo Cuesta	(Mexico) Club Puebla	Free transfer	16 July 2020	
16	DF	(Thailand) Chinnawat Wongchai	(Thailand) Rayong F.C.	Season loan	7 September 2020	
31	MF	(Thailand) Anuwat Noicheunphan	(Thailand) Chainat Hornbill	Transfer	7 September 2020	
62	MF	(Thailand) Airfan Doloh	(Thailand) Uthai Thani F.C.	Season loan	25 December 2020	
	MF	(Thailand) Havar Dahl	(Thailand) Uthai Thani F.C.	Season loan	25 December 2020	
88	MF	(Thailand) Watcharakorn Manoworn	(Thailand) Uthai Thani F.C.	Season loan	25 December 2020	
	MF	(Thailand) Apidet Janngam	(Thailand) Uthai Thani F.C.	Season loan	25 December 2020	
50	DF	(Thailand) Kritsana Daokrajai	(Thailand) Uthai Thani F.C.	Season loan	25 December 2020	
	FW	(Thailand) Pattara Soimalai	(Thailand) Uthai Thani F.C.	Season loan	25 December 2020	
44	FW	(Serbia) Marko Šćepović	(Cyprus) AC Omonia	Undisclosed		
5	DF	(Croatia) Renato Kelić	(Thailand) Chonburi F.C.	Season loan	26 December 2020	
55	MF	(Uzbekistan) Akbar Ismatullaev	(Uzbekistan)	Undisclosed		
26	MF	(Israel) Gidi Kanyuk	(Thailand) Nakhon Ratchasima F.C.	Season loan		

=== Loan return ===
No.	Pos	Player	From	Fee	Date	Source
59	GK	(Thailand) Nopphon Lakhonphon	(Thailand) Lampang FC	End of loan	30 November 2019	
27	DF	(Thailand) Nattapon Malapun	(Thailand) PT Prachuap F.C.	End of loan	30 November 2019	
33	DF	(Thailand) Sarayut Sompim	(Thailand) PTT Rayong F.C.	End of loan	30 November 2019	
	DF	(Thailand) Abdulhafiz Bueraheng	(Thailand) PTT Rayong F.C.	End of loan	30 November 2019	
	DF	(Thailand) Jakkapong Suabsamut	(Thailand) Ubon United F.C.	End of loan	30 November 2019	
	DF	(Thailand) Peerawat Akkatam	(Thailand) Kasetsart F.C.	End of loan	30 November 2019	
	MF	(South Korea) Go Seul-ki	(Thailand) Port F.C.	End of loan	30 November 2019	
	MF	(Thailand) Apichart Denman	(Thailand) PT Prachuap F.C.	End of loan	30 November 2019	
	MF	(Thailand) Anuwat Noicheunphan	(Thailand) Army United F.C.	End of loan	30 November 2019	
55	MF	(Thailand) Panyawat Nisangram	(Thailand) Lampang F.C.	End of loan	30 November 2019	
	MF	(Thailand) Yutpichai Lertlam	(Thailand) Khon Kaen F.C.	End of loan	30 November 2019	
88	MF	(Thailand) Watcharakorn Manoworn	(Thailand) Khon Kaen F.C.	End of loan	30 November 2019	
77	FW	(Thailand) Mehti Sarakham	(Thailand) Lampang F.C.	End of loan	30 November 2019	
	FW	(Philippines) Javier Patiño	(Thailand) Ratchaburi FC	End of loan	30 November 2019	

== Friendlies ==
=== Pre-Season Friendly ===
Win Draw Loss

5 January 2020 1	Buriram United (Thailand)	2–1	(Thailand) Police Tero	Buriram, Thailand
				Stadium: Khao Kradong Stadium

11 January 2020 2	Buriram United (Thailand)	2–1	(Thailand) PT Prachuap	Buriram, Thailand
	Jung Jae-yong 82'		9'	Stadium: Khao Kradong Stadium

15 January 2020 3	Buriram United (Thailand)	2–0	(Thailand) Nakhon Ratchasima	Buriram, Thailand
	Jung Jae-yong 20'; Kevin Ingreso 61'			Stadium: Khao Kradong Stadium

2 February 2020 4	Buriram United (Thailand)	1–1	(South Korea) Pohang Steelers	Buriram, Thailand
				Stadium: Chang Arena

=== Mid-Season Friendly ===
Win Draw Loss

9 August 2020 1	Buriram United (Thailand)	3–2	(Thailand) Nongbua Pitchaya	Buriram
			Tiago Chulapa	Stadium: Chang Arena

16 August 2020 2	Buriram United (Thailand)	3–1	(Thailand) Khon Kaen	Buriram
				Stadium: Chang Arena

30 August 2020 3	Buriram United (Thailand)	3–2	(Thailand) Ratchaburi Mitr Phol	Buriram
18:00 UTC+7	Supachok Sarachat 33'; Apiwat Ngaolamhin 82'; Supachai Jaided 96'		Jakkapan Pornsai 64'; Apiwat Pengprakon 88'	Stadium: Chang Arena

5 September 2020 4	Buriram United (Thailand)	8–0	(Thailand) Khon Kaen United	Buriram
	Pansa Hemviboon 45+3'; Marko Šćepović 47' 53'; Supachok Sarachat 64' 78'; Jakkaphan Kaewprom 80' 90'; Thanisorn Phaiboonkitjarern 110'			Stadium: Chang Arena

== Competitions ==
=== Overview ===
Competition	First match	Last match	Starting round	Final position	Record							
Competition	First match	Last match	Starting round	Final position	Pld	W	D	L	GF	GA	GD	Win %
Thai League	16 February 2020	28 March 2021	Matchday 1	2nd	30	20	3	7	63	26	+37	66.67
FA Cup	7 November 2020	7 April 2021	First Round	Semi-finals	5	3	1	1	16	2	+14	60.00
Champions League	21 January 2020	28 January 2020	Preliminary round 2	Play-off round	2	1	0	1	2	4	−2	50.00
Total					37	24	4	9	81	32	+49	64.86

Last updated: 7 April 2021
Source: Competitions

=== Thai League ===
==== League table ====
Pos	Team	Pld	W	D	L	GF	GA	GD	Pts	Qualification
1	BG Pathum United (C)	30	24	5	1	54	13	+41	77	Qualification for 2022 AFC Champions League group stage
2	Buriram United	30	20	3	7	63	26	+37	63	Qualification for 2022 AFC Champions League qualifying play-offs
3	Port	30	17	5	8	58	36	+22	56	Qualification for 2022 AFC Champions League qualifying play-offs
4	Chiangrai United (Note: Chiangrai United qualified for the AFC Champions League group stage as 2020–21 Thai FA Cup winners.)	30	16	6	8	48	32	+16	54	Qualification for 2022 AFC Champions League group stage
5	Bangkok United	30	15	6	9	57	39	+18	51	

Source: Thai League
Rules for classification: 1) Points; 2) Head-to-head points; 3) Head-to-head goals difference; 4) Head-to-head goals scored; 5) Overall goals difference; 6) Overall goals scored; 7) Fair play points; 8) Play-off without extra time;).
(C) Champions

==== Results overview ====
Overall								Home						Away					
Pld	W	D	L	GF	GA	GD	Pts	W	D	L	GF	GA	GD	W	D	L	GF	GA	GD
30	20	3	7	63	26	+37	63	10	1	4	32	11	+21	10	2	3	31	15	+16

Matchday	1	2	3	4	5	6	7	8	9	10	11	12	13	14	15	16	17	18	19	20	21	22	23	24	25	26	27	28	29	30
Ground	A	H	A	H	H	A	A	H	A	H	H	A	H	A	A	A	H	A	H	A	A	H	A	H	A	H	A	H	H	H
Result	L	W	L	D	W	W	L	L	D	L	W	W	L	W	W	W	W	W	L	W	W	W	W	W	D	W	W	W	W	W
Position	11	6	9	11	12	10	9	10	11	12	11	8	8	5	5	4	3	3	3	3	3	2	2	2	2	2	2	2	2	2

Updated to match(es) played on 28 March 2021. Source: Thai League results
A = Away; H = Home; W = Win; D = Draw; L = Loss

==== Matches ====
16 February 2020 1	Police Tero	1–0	Buriram United	Lak Si, Bangkok
18:00 UTC+7	Narong 11'	Report		Stadium: Boonyachinda Stadium

22 February 2020 2	Buriram United	4–0	Chonburi	Buriram
19:00 UTC+7	Supachok Sarachat 6' 33'; Bernardo Cuesta 61'; Narubadin Weerawatnodom 67'; Korrakot Wiriyaudomsiri (yellow card) 90+3'	report	Korawit Namwiset (yellow card) 32'; Júnior Lopes (red card) 42'; Kritsada Kaman (yellow card) 45+3'	Stadium: Chang Arena

26 February 2020 3	Ratchaburi Mitr Phol	4–3	Buriram United	Ratchaburi
19:00 UTC+7	Yannick Boli 59'; Lossémy Karaboué 63'; Philip Roller 76'; Javier Patiño 90+3'	report	Ricardo Bueno 32'; Andrés Túñez 42'; Supachok Sarachat 88'	Stadium: Mitr Phol Stadium

1 March 2020 4	Buriram United	1–1	Port	Buriram
19:00 UTC+7	Supachok Sarachat 25'	report	Heberty Fernandes 23'	Stadium: Chang Arena

26 September 2020 7	Buriram United	1–0	Suphanburi	Buriram
20:00 UTC+7	Kanyuk 15'	Report		Stadium: Chang Arena

3 October 2020 8	Singha Chiangrai United	0–1	Buriram United	Chiang Rai
18:00 UTC+7		Report	Kelić 87'	Stadium: Singha Stadium

10 October 2020 5	BG Pathum United	1–0	Buriram United	Thanyaburi, Pathum Thani
19:00 UTC+7	Túñez 58'	Report		Stadium: Leo Stadium

18 October 2020 9	Buriram United	1–2	Nakhon Ratchasima Mazda	Buriram
18:00 UTC+7	Kanyuk 57'	Report	Murillo 27'; Assumpção 61'	Stadium: Chang Arena

25 October 2020 10	Trat	2–2	Buriram United	Trat
18:00 UTC+7	Rangsan 66'; Ricardo Santos 90+2' (pen.)	Report	Šćepović 21', 80' (pen.)	Stadium: Trat Province Stadium

31 October 2020 11	Buriram United	2–3	SCG Muangthong United	Buriram
18:00 UTC+7	Šćepović 15'; Apiwat 79'	Report	Lucas Rocha 35'; Derley 59' (pen.); Popp 77'	Stadium: Chang Arena

11 November 2020 6	Buriram United	5–1	Rayong	Buriram
18:00 UTC+7	Šćepović 9'; Kelić 14'; Supachai 66'; Supachok 74'; Ingreso 79'	Report	Pitbull 31'	Stadium: Chang Arena

22 November 2020 12	Sukhothai	0–3	Buriram United	Sukhothai
19:00 UTC+7		Report	Ingreso 33'; Supachai 49'; Ratthanakorn 90+6'	Stadium: Thalay Luang Stadium

29 November 2020 13	Buriram United	1–3	Samut Prakan City	Buriram
17:45 UTC+7	Šćepović 42'	Report	Jaroensak 25'; Chakkit 53'; Tardeli 70'	Stadium: Chang Arena

12 December 2020 14	True Bangkok United	1–2	Buriram United	Khlong Luang, Pathum Thani
18:00 UTC+7	Vander Luiz 63'	Report	Jakkaphan 60'; Kelić 73'	Stadium: Thammasat Stadium

20 December 2020 15	PT Prachuap	0–1	Buriram United	Prachuap Khiri Khan
18:00 UTC+7		Report	Supachai Jaided 14'	Stadium: Sam Ao Stadium

26 December 2020 16	Chonburi	0–2	Buriram United	Chonburi
19:00 UTC+7		Report	Jakkaphan 39'; Samuel Rosa 53'	Stadium: Chonburi Stadium

6 February 2021 17	Buriram United	3–0	Ratchaburi Mitr Phol	Buriram
17:00 UTC+7	Samuel Rosa 19'; Aung Thu 65'; Ratthanakorn 75'	Report		Stadium: Chang Arena; Attendance: 0

9 February 2021 18	Port	1–2	Buriram United	Khlong Toei, Bangkok
19:00 UTC+7	Sergio Suárez 48'	Report	Apiwat Ngaolamhin 80'; Maicon Marques 82'	Stadium: PAT Stadium; Attendance: 0

13 February 2021 19	Buriram United	0–1	BG Pathum United	Buriram
18:00 UTC+7		Report	Diogo Luís Santo 9'	Stadium: Chang Arena; Attendance: 0

16 February 2021 20	Rayong	0–5	Buriram United	Rayong
19:00 UTC+7		Report	Piyaphon Phanichakul 2', 70'; Pansa Hemviboon 20'; Supachok Sarachat 52'; Chakkit Laptrakul 87'	Stadium: Rayong Province Stadium; Attendance: 0

20 February 2021 21	Suphanburi	2–3	Buriram United	Suphan Buri
19:00 UTC+7	Caion 6', 75'	Report	Supachok Sarachat 56' (pen.), 72' (pen.), 85'	Stadium: Suphan Buri Provincial Stadium; Attendance: 0

24 February 2021 22	Buriram United	1–0	Singha Chiangrai United	Buriram
19:00 UTC+7	Supachok Sarachat 71' (pen.)	Report		Stadium: Chang Arena; Attendance: 0

27 February 2021 23	Nakhon Ratchasima Mazda	0–3	Buriram United	Nakhon Ratchasima
17:00 UTC+7		Report	Pansa Hemviboon 51'; Samuel Rosa 74' (pen.); Maicon Marques 76'	Stadium: 80th Birthday Stadium; Attendance: 0

2 March 2021 24	Buriram United	2–0	Trat	Trat
18:30 UTC+7	Supachai Jaided 24'; Suphanat Mueanta 82'	Report		Stadium: Trat Province Stadium

6 March 2021 25	SCG Muangthong United	2–2	Buriram United	Pak Kret, Nonthaburi
17:00 UTC+7	Korrawit Tasa 57'; Suporn Peenagatapho 79'	Report	Maicon Marques 47'; Piyaphon Phanichakul 71'	Stadium: SCG Stadium; Attendance: ≈7,500; Referee: Chairurk Ngamsom

10 March 2021 26	Buriram United	3–0	Sukhothai	Buriram
18:30 UTC+7	Jakkaphan Kaewprom 29'; Suphanat Mueanta 77'; Chakkit Laptrakul 90+3'	Report		Stadium: Chang Arena

14 March 2021 27	Samut Prakan City	1–2	Buriram United	Bang Phli, Samut Prakan
17:00 UTC+7	Aris Zarifović 24'	Report	Maicon Marques 87' (pen.), 90+6' (pen.)	Stadium: Samut Prakarn Stadium

18 March 2021 28	Buriram United	2–0	True Bangkok United	Buriram
19:00 UTC+7	Supachai Jaided 9'; Jakkaphan Kaewprom 90+4'	Report		Stadium: Chang Arena

21 March 2021 29	Buriram United	4–0	PT Prachuap	Buriram
19:00 UTC+7	Samuel Rosa 20', 26' (pen.); Aung Thu 45'; Maicon Marques 88'	Report		Stadium: Chang Arena

28 March 2021 30	Buriram United	2–0	Police Tero	Buriram
18:00 UTC+7	Maicon Marques 27', 30'	Report		Stadium: Chang Arena

Notes The matches since week 5 are postponed following the coronavirus outbreak and will be played with limited spectators following the new normal regulations.

=== FA Cup ===
7 November 2020 First round	Buriram United	9–0	Samutsongkhram	Buriram
18:00 UTC+7	Šćepović 13'; Apiwat 24', 40', 86'; Sarayut 44'; Supachai 68'; Kanyuk 70'; Narubadin 80'; Supachok 90'	Report		Stadium: Chang Arena

6 December 2020 Second round	Buriram United	4–0	Police Tero	Buriram
18:00 UTC+7	Jakkaphan 18'; Supachai 45', 90'; Supachok 90+2'	Report		Stadium: Chang Arena

3 February 2021 Third round	Port	0–0 (a.e.t.) (8–9 p)	Buriram United	Khlong Toei, Bangkok
18:00 UTC+7		Report		Stadium: PAT Stadium; Attendance: 0 Referee: Chairerk Ngamsom; Assistant referees: Thanet Chuchuen; Komsan Kampan; Fourth official: Thitichai Nualchan
	Penalties
	David Rochela (penalty scored); Sergio Suárez (penalty scored); Siwakorn Jakkuprasat (penalty scored); Go Seul-ki (penalty scored); Adisak Kraisorn (penalty scored); Thanasit Siriphala (penalty missed); Nattawut Sombatyotha (penalty scored); Kevin Deeromram (penalty scored); Nitipong Selanon (penalty scored); Tanaboon Kesarat (penalty missed)		(penalty scored) Ratthanakorn Maikami; (penalty scored) Sasalak Haiprakhon; (penalty scored) Pansa Hemviboon; (penalty scored) Suphanat Mueanta; (penalty scored) Siwarak Tedsungnoen; (penalty missed) Chakkit Laptrakul; (penalty scored) Maicon Marques; (penalty scored) Tinnakorn Asurin; (penalty scored) Jakkaphan Kaewprom; (penalty scored) Narubadin Weerawatnodom

3 April 2021 Quarter-finals	Buriram United	2–0	SCG Muangthong United	Buriram
18:00 UTC+7	Samuel Rosa Gonçalves 72' (pen.); Supachok Sarachat 77'	Report		Stadium: Chang Arena

7 April 2021 Semi-finals	Chonburi	2–1	Buriram United	Khlong Luang, Pathum Thani
19:00 UTC+7	Worachit Kanitsribampen 25'; Junior Eldstål 59'	Report	Supachok Sarachat 28'	Stadium: Thammasat Stadium

=== AFC Champions League ===
==== Preliminary round 2 ====
21 January 2020 Preliminary #2	Buriram United (Thailand)	2–1	(Vietnam) Hồ Chí Minh City	Buriram, Thailand
18:30 UTC+7	Cuesta 53'; Bueno 74'		Diakité 77'	Stadium: Chang Arena; Referee: Nivon Robesh Gamini (Sri Lanka)

==== Play-off round ====
28 January 2020 Play-off	Shanghai SIPG (China)	3–0	(Thailand) Buriram United	Shanghai, China
15:00 UTC+8	Li Shenglong 77'; Arnautović 90+2'; Hulk 90+5' (pen.)	Report		Stadium: Yuanshen Sports Centre Stadium; Attendance: 0 (Note: The Shanghai SIPG v Buriram United match is played without spectators following the coronavirus outbreak.); Referee: Aziz Asimov (Uzbekistan)

== Statistics ==
=== Appearances ===
Players with no appearances are not included in the list.
As of match played 7 April 2021

No.	Pos.	Nat.	Name	Thai League		FA Cup		ACL		Total	
No.	Pos.	Nat.	Name	Apps	Starts	Apps	Starts	Apps	Starts	Apps	Starts
1	GK	(Thailand)	Siwarak Tedsungnoen	30	30	4	4	2	2	36	36
2	DF	(Thailand)	Sasalak Haiprakhon	26	26	5	5	2	2	33	33
3	DF	(Thailand)	Pansa Hemviboon	29	29	4	4	2	2	35	35
4	DF	(Thailand)	Piyaphon Phanichakul	12	7	3	1	0	0	15	8
6	DF	(Thailand)	Tinnakorn Asurin	9	7	2	0	0	0	11	7
7	FW	(Brazil)	Maicon Marques	15	8	3	2	0	0	18	10
8	MF	(Thailand)	Ratthanakorn Maikami	29	27	5	5	2	2	36	36
9	FW	(Thailand)	Supachai Jaided	28	18	5	5	0	0	33	33
10	MF	(Thailand)	Jakkaphan Kaewprom	27	18	3	3	2	0	32	21
11	DF	(Thailand)	Korrakot Wiriyaudomsiri	8	2	1	0	1	0	10	2
13	MF	(Australia)	Brandon O'Neill	10	7	3	3	0	0	13	10
14	DF	(Thailand)	Chitipat Tanklang	12	6	1	1	0	0	13	7
15	DF	(Thailand)	Narubadin Weerawatnodom	27	27	5	5	2	2	34	34
17	MF	(Thailand)	Chakkit Laptrakul	8	0	2	1	0	0	10	1
18	DF	(Thailand)	Apiwat Ngaolamhin	20	14	3	3	1	0	24	17
19	MF	(Thailand)	Supachok Sarachat	28	21	4	3	2	2	34	26
22	MF	(Philippines)	Kevin Ingreso	24	18	0	0	0	0	24	18
26	DF	(Brazil)	Digão	0	0	3	3	0	0	3	3
29	GK	(Thailand)	Yotsapon Teangdar	2	0	1	1	0	0	3	1
54	FW	(Thailand)	Suphanat Mueanta	16	4	2	1	2	2	20	7
77	MF	(Myanmar)	Aung Thu	7	4	0	0	0	0	7	4
91	FW	(Brazil)	Samuel Rosa	11	8	3	2	0	0	14	10
Players who left club during the season (transfer/loan)
5	DF	(Venezuela)	Andrés Túñez	4	4	0	0	2	2	6	6
5	DF	(Croatia)	Renato Kelić	12	12	1	1	0	0	13	13
6	MF	(South Korea)	Jung Jae-yong	4	4	0	0	2	2	6	6
21	FW	(Argentina)	Bernardo Cuesta	4	4	0	0	2	2	6	6
23	DF	(Thailand)	Sarayut Sompim	0	0	1	1	0	0	1	1
26	MF	(Israel)	Gidi Kanyuk	10	6	2	1	0	0	12	7
44	MF	(Serbia)	Marko Scepovic	9	8	2	2	0	0	11	10
55	MF	(Uzbekistan)	Akbar Ismatullaev	10	7	2	1	0	0	12	8
62	MF	(Thailand)	Airfan Doloh	0	0	1	1	0	0	1	1
88	MF	(Thailand)	Watcharakorn Manoworn	0	0	1	0	0	0	1	0
99	FW	(Brazil)	Ricardo Bueno	4	4	0	0	2	2	6	6

=== Goalscorers ===
Includes all competitive matches. The list is sorted by shirt number when total goals are equal.
Player who left the club during the season.
As of match played 7 April 2021

Rank	No.	Player	Thai League	FA Cup	ACL	Total
1	19	(Thailand) Supachok Sarachat	10	4	0	14
2	7	(Brazil) Maicon Marques	8	0	0	8
2	9	(Thailand) Supachai Jaided	5	3	0	8
4	44	(Serbia) Marko Šćepović	5	1	0	6
4	91	(Brazil) Samuel Rosa Gonçalves	5	1	0	6
6	10	(Thailand) Jakkaphan Kaewprom	4	1	0	5
6	18	(Thailand) Apiwat Ngaolamhin	2	3	0	5
8	4	(Thailand) Piyaphon Phanichakul	3	0	0	3
8	5	(Croatia) Renato Kelić	3	0	0	3
8	26	(Israel) Gidi Kanyuk	2	1	0	3
8	99	(Brazil) Ricardo Bueno	2	0	1	3
12	3	(Thailand) Pansa Hemviboon	2	0	0	2
12	8	(Thailand) Ratthanakorn Maikami	2	0	0	2
12	15	(Thailand) Narubadin Weerawatnodom	1	1	0	2
12	17	(Thailand) Chakkit Laptrakul	2	0	0	2
12	22	(Philippines) Kevin Ingreso	2	0	0	2
12	54	(Thailand) Suphanat Mueanta	2	0	0	2
12	77	(Myanmar) Aung Thu	2	0	0	2
19	5	(Venezuela) Andrés Túñez	1	0	0	1
19	21	(Argentina) Bernardo Cuesta	0	0	1	1
19	23	(Thailand) Sarayut Sompim	0	1	0	1
Totals			63	16	2	81

=== Clean sheets ===
As of match played 3 April 2021

No.	Player	Thai League	FA Cup	ACL	Total
1	(Thailand) Siwarak Tedsungnoen	15	3	0	18
29	(Thailand) Yotsapon Teangdar	2 (Note: In the league match v PT Prachuap (Home) & v Police Tero (Home), Siwarak played in the first half and was substituted out for Yotsapon in the second half.)	1	0	3
Total		15	4	0	19
