= 2021–22 Thai FA Cup =

Chang FA Cup

Tournament details
- Country: Thailand
- Dates: 29 September 2021–22 May 2022
- Teams: 94

Final positions
- Champions: Buriram United (5th title)
- Runners-up: Nakhon Ratchasima Mazda

Tournament statistics
- Matches played: 93
- Goals scored: 376 (4.04 per match)
- Top goal scorer(s): Apiwat Pengprakon, Danilo Alves (6 goals)

Awards
- Best player: Supachok Sarachat

The 2021–22 Thai FA Cup is the 28th season of a Thailand's knockout football competition. The tournament was sponsored by Chang, and known as the Chang FA Cup (Thai: ช้าง เอฟเอคัพ) for sponsorship purposes. The tournament is organized by the Football Association of Thailand. 94 clubs were accepted into the tournament, and it began with the qualification round on 29 September 2021 and concluded with the final on 22 May 2022. The winner would have qualified for the 2023 AFC Champions League play-off and the 2022 Thailand Champions Cup.

== Calendar ==
Round	Date	Matches	Clubs	New entries this round
Qualification round	29 September 2021 and 6 October 2021	30	13 + 28 + 19 → 30	13 2021–22 Thai League 2; 28 2021–22 Thai League 3; 19 Thailand Amateur League
First round	27 October 2021	32	30 + 16 + 3 + 7 + 8 → 32	16 2021–22 Thai League 1; 3 2021–22 Thai League 2; 7 2021–22 Thai League 3; 8 Thailand Amateur League
Second round	24 November 2021	16	32 → 16	
Third round	19 January 2022 and 2 February 2022	8	16 → 8	
Quarter-finals	16 February 2022	4	8 → 4	
Semi-finals	18 May 2022	2	4 → 2	
Final	22 May 2022	1	2 → Champions	
Total				94 clubs

== Results ==
Note: T1: Clubs from Thai League 1; T2: Clubs from Thai League 2; T3: Clubs from Thai League 3; TA: Clubs from Thailand Amateur League.

=== Qualification round ===
There were 13 clubs from 2021–22 Thai League 2, 28 clubs from 2021–22 Thai League 3, and 19 clubs from Thailand Amateur League have signed to qualifying in 2021–22 Thai FA cup. This round had drawn on 10 September 2021. There are 113 goals that occurred in this round.

29 September 2021	Surindra YMA (TA)	3–4	Nonthaburi United S.Boonmeerit (T3)	Mueang, Surin
15:00 (UTC+7)	Kittisap Kraisuea 19', 71'; Thiraphon Praosaen 32'	Report	Chitsanuphong Phimpsang 53', 67'; Natcha Promsomboon 72', 79'	Stadium: Stadium of Rajamangala University of Technology Isan, Surin Campus; Attendance: 0 Referee: Apidet Vongsa; Assistant referees: Weerayut Meesiri, Atibbordee Wangsri; Fourth official: Methas Kumarasit

29 September 2021	Singha Neua Chiangmai (TA)	1–1 (4–5 p)	Pathumthani University (T3)	Mueang, Chiangmai
15:00 (UTC+7)	Tirapong Gonsombut 45+2'	Report	Arnon Buspha 13'	Stadium: Chiangmai Municipality Stadium; Attendance: 0 Referee: Jirapan Thewa-anukhroh; Assistant referees: Watcharakron Airla, Tudsanee Khuanpet; Fourth official: Doungkaew Doungtawan
	Penalties
	Tirapong Gonsombut (penalty missed); Noppawit Jongsaeng (penalty scored); Apirak Danphongpee (penalty scored); Somrit Daenphongphi (penalty missed); Werachit Suttaket (penalty scored); Weeradet Sisaeng (penalty scored); Banyaphon Saekhow (penalty missed)		(penalty missed) Adunlikhit Saengdaeng; (penalty scored) Phiphat Saengwong; (penalty scored) Kerkkert Nimura; (penalty scored) Narasak Phophung; (penalty missed) Thatphong Suksamran; (penalty scored) Surachai Nueangphak; (penalty scored) Witsarut Sriburin

29 September 2021	Roi-et 2018 (TA)	2–1	Royal Thai Fleet (T3)	Mueang, Roiet
15:00 (UTC+7)	Rittichai Suparee 17', 39'	Report	Ratchanon Insungnoen 90+6'	Stadium: Roiet Provincial Stadium; Attendance: 0 Referee: Panya Nawasimainam; Assistant referees: Suknipon Yuennan, Suksan Thongkoed; Fourth official: Somruethai Kongkairat

29 September 2021	Udon United (T3)	4–0	Teerachaipallet Samut Prakan (TA)	Mueang, Udon Thani
15:00 (UTC+7)	Aitthiphon Chankhotr 45'; Célio Guilherme da Silva Santos 53'; Eiman Kaabi 71'; Kraiwit Boonlue 90+3'	Report		Stadium: Stadium of Thailand National Sports University, Udon Thani Campus; Attendance: 0 Referee: Komkrit Sawong; Assistant referees: Nattapong Wadweangcom, Chinnawat Kottai; Fourth official: Jirapun Hongsudta

29 September 2021	Saraburi United (T3)	0–1	Phitsanulok (T3)	Mueang, Saraburi
15:00 (UTC+7)		Report	Phiphat Sueaphin 24'	Stadium: Saraburi Stadium; Attendance: 0 Referee: Satchukorn Saenchu; Assistant referees: Peerapat Jumruspong, Yuranan Nukhao; Fourth official: Saravut Suksalee

29 September 2021	Kasem Bundit University (T3)	1–1 (4–3 p)	Ayutthaya United (T2)	Minburi, Bangkok
15:00 (UTC+7)	Attaphon Kannoo 78'	Report	Paroonrit Singnon 45+2'	Stadium: Stadium of Kasem Bundit University; Attendance: 0 Referee: Suttipong Tepa; Assistant referees: Sila Jinnigorn, Pramote Boon-in; Fourth official: Peeratat Kittikanmetee
	Penalties
	Kantapong Poopunsri (penalty missed); Kroekpon Kaewmuean (penalty scored); Attaphon Kannoo (penalty scored); Suradech Thongchai (penalty scored); Kourouma Mohamed (penalty scored)		(penalty scored) Teerapat Laohabut; (penalty missed) Jessadakorn Noysri; (penalty scored) Petch Laohaserikul; (penalty scored) Suttapat Sanklong; (penalty missed) Chanayut Srisawat

29 September 2021	Phichit United (TA)	2–4	Muangkan United (T2)	Wat Bot, Phitsanulok
15:00 (UTC+7)	Santisak Tadthiang 18'; Amnart Rakprasert 86' (pen.)	Report; Highlight	Caion 38', 47'; Leandro Assumpção 44'; Jonatan Ferreira Reis 90' (pen.)	Stadium: H2H Sport Stadium; Attendance: 0 Referee: Wathanyu Morin; Assistant referees: Sarayut Sriampri, Anucha Pinamon; Fourth official: Poowasak Sukunt

29 September 2021	Samut Songkhram (T3)	0–3	Prime Bangkok (T3)	Mueang, Ratchaburi
15:00 (UTC+7)		Report	Patiharn Suananan 45+1'; Kieron Burrell 73'; Niphitphon Wongpanya 76'	Stadium: Ratchaburi Stadium; Attendance: 0 Referee: Aidsara Gaedthai; Assistant referees: Weeraphong Chaiyasuk, Adisak Thongmaha; Fourth official: Wisarut Kantawong

29 September 2021	Bangkok (T3)	5–0	Surin City (T3)	Thung Khru, Bangkok
15:00 (UTC+7)	Caíque Freitas Ribeiro 25', 34', 84'; Somsak Musikaphan 77'; Phootran Gingpan 86'	Report; Highlight		Stadium: 72nd Anniversary Stadium; Attendance: 0 Referee: Nasri Tamat; Assistant referees: Kittisak Khotpanya, Apichat Tawanboekfa; Fourth official: Surathat Sanont

29 September 2021	Banbueng (T3)	0–4	Sukhothai (T2)	Mueang, Chonburi
15:00 (UTC+7)		Report; Highlight	Nicolás Vélez 15', 33', 37'; Jeong Woo-geun 26'	Stadium: Chonburi Stadium; Attendance: 0 Referee: Chaikrit Inboonsong; Assistant referees: Chaiyos Sripak, Phariwat Phoyoo; Fourth official: Narongsak Kubkun

29 September 2021	Bang Pa-in Ayutthaya (T3)	0–3	Songkhla (T3)	Pak Kret, Nonthaburi
15:00 (UTC+7)		Report; Highlight	Anooruk Suepsunthon 45+2'; Teerayut Ngamlamai 81'; Akarawit Saemaram 90'	Stadium: Mawin Stadium; Attendance: 0 Referee: Pichit Thongjanmoon; Assistant referees: Natthakit Konfu, Narakorn Sapsuksai; Fourth official: Kittipong Choolerd

29 September 2021	Thawi Watthana Samut Sakhon United (T3)	4–1	Pakchong SCK (TA)	Thawi Watthana, Bangkok
15:00 (UTC+7)	Calvin Agustin Castagnino Couceiro 13'; Ramiro Lizaso 27', 58'; Noppaklao Damrongthai 45+2'	Report	Sitthichai Pongsathit 51' (pen.)	Stadium: Stadium of Bangkokthonburi University; Attendance: 0 Referee: Yuttana Sadkrathok; Assistant referees: Kunach Sanggoranee, Sujin Rodart; Fourth official: Thanet Jairaw

29 September 2021	Pattaya Dolphins United (T3)	2–0	Chachoengsao Hi-Tek (T3)	Bang Lamung, Chonburi
15:00 (UTC+7)	Noptassanon Namnuad 23'; Suksan Bunta 90+1'	Report		Stadium: Nong Prue Stadium; Attendance: 0 Referee: Chaiyaporn Yongsang; Assistant referees: Chaiwat Rupsa-at, Siravich Konngam; Fourth official: Tiyaporn Thamsanit

29 September 2021	Kalasin United (TA)	1–3	Rasisalai United (TA)	Mueang, Kalasin
15:00 (UTC+7)	Phirayut Saracharoen 78'	Report	Baphit Chooklin 23', 62'; Wichit Kongsinkaew 75'	Stadium: Kalasin Stadium; Attendance: 0 Referee: Sittichai Saramai; Assistant referees: Apisit Yotayut, Jakkrit Pratum; Fourth official: Pongdanai Sadsadee

29 September 2021	Saimit Kabin United (T3)	0–0 (5–6 p)	Mahasarakham (T3)	Kabinburi, Prachinburi
15:00 (UTC+7)		Report		Stadium: Nom Klao Maharaj Stadium; Attendance: 0 Referee: Pornthep Promsopa; Assistant referees: Puttipong Saensarn, Pongsakorn Wisitsri; Fourth official: Peeyaporn Worachaikueakun
	Penalties
	Naraebes Tandam (penalty missed); Pichit Jaibun (penalty scored); Prawit Bureeted (penalty scored); Kanok Kongsimma (penalty scored); Oumar Sanou (penalty scored); Victor Clemente de Oliveira (penalty scored); Chaloemchai Kraiwiset (penalty missed); Terdsak Samat (penalty missed)		(penalty scored) Nonthawat Chari; (penalty scored) Pitakpong Kunsuwan; (penalty missed) Teerawat Kotami; (penalty scored) Nitipong Ruangsa; (penalty scored) Isarapong Lilakorn; (penalty scored) Jirapong Chaiprom; (penalty missed) Rewat Khumbun; (penalty scored) Nontapat Pradapmook

29 September 2021	Kamphaengphet (T3)	3–1	Dome (TA)	Khanu Woralaksaburi, Kamphaengphet
15:00 (UTC+7)	Pongphet Karaket 5'; Punyaphat Autha 8'; Supachai Noiphan 90+3'	Report	Surachai Thongtha 74'	Stadium: Stadium of Khanu Wittaya School; Attendance: 130; Referee: Bongkod Tiansavang; Assistant referees: Chairat Tonglaima, Yotin Sukomut; Fourth official: Suchin Khewsopa

29 September 2021	Muang Loei United (T3)	6–1	Kanjanapat (T3)	Mueang, Loei
15:00 (UTC+7)	Sitichok Teecorngon 5', 29'; Partchya Katethip 18'; Amporn Chaipong 51'; Alexandre Balotelli 59'; Patchara Nantasri 90+6'	Report	Ozor Enoch 45+2'	Stadium: Blue Dragon Mueang Loei Stadium; Attendance: 0 Referee: Patiyut Monthianart; Assistant referees: Jirayu Aotjansri, Nopphadet Rangkrathok; Fourth official: Preecha Chuchartchuart

29 September 2021	Institute of Entrepreneurial Science Ayothaya (TA)	0–3	Khon Kaen (T2)	Minburi, Bangkok
15:00 (UTC+7)		Report	Burin Wongsrikaeo 55', 62'; Parenya Kadeewee 71'	Stadium: 72nd Anniversary Stadium; Attendance: 0 Referee: Phitsanu Chusi; Assistant referees: Jareon Nunboon, Hanyot Buangrab; Fourth official: Sapuding Kalong

29 September 2021	Nan City (TA)	2–1	Namphong United (TA)	Thawangpha, Nan
15:00 (UTC+7)	Rattasart Bunchoopuk 26'; Praphan Chanbun 90+1'	Report	Patomphong Khamchandee 75' (pen.)	Stadium: Stadium of Thawangpha Pittayakhom School; Attendance: 0 Referee: Sarawut Tawiya; Assistant referees: Teerapong Oma, Teerawat Uma; Fourth official: Thongsuk Thiamrach

29 September 2021	Nakhon Ratchasima United (T3)	0–1	Marines Eureka (T3)	Mueang, Nakhon Ratchasima
15:00 (UTC+7)		Report	Chonlapat Singruang 80'	Stadium: Stadium of Nakhon Ratchasima Rajabhat University; Attendance: 0 Referee: Samart Kaikaew; Assistant referees: Watchara Wongkhan, Songphon Panthai; Fourth official: Watcharachat Loumpool

29 September 2021	Wang Noi City (TA)	1–5	Udon Thani (T2)	Bang Sai, Ayutthaya
15:00 (UTC+7)	Artid Wongwain 42'	Report	Danuson Wijitpunya 5', 8'; Ritthidet Phensawat 38', 40'; Phakhinai Nammichai 71'	Stadium: Ratchakram Stadium; Attendance: 0 Referee: Samrit Ritkaew; Assistant referees: Dumrongchai Chuangaroen, Sahatnet Deemongkol; Fourth official: Wicharn Klinthaworn

29 September 2021	MH Nakhon Si (TA)	2–0	Thai Spirit (TA)	Wiang Sa, Surat Thani
15:00 (UTC+7)	Suphakrit Suphap 9'; Teerapat Kerdkunchon 69'	Report		Stadium: Bansong Stadium; Attendance: 0 Referee: Wichai Pannil; Assistant referees: Preecha Lanui, Nirut Suetrong; Fourth official: Artit Srinoy

29 September 2021	Chiangrai (TA)	2–1	Chiangmai Coaching (TA)	Mueang, Chiangrai
15:00 (UTC+7)	Jhakkri Panthong 24' (o.g.); Apichit Jaipan 37'	Report	Peerapol Sompong 60'	Stadium: Chiangrai Provincial Stadium; Attendance: 0 Referee: Chalit Ploypech; Assistant referees: Sumeth Saengrat, Ronachai Raepang; Fourth official: Ekkachai Juywong

29 September 2021	Khon Kaen Sambaitao (TA)	1–3	Grakcu Sai Mai United (T3)	Mueang, Mahasarakham
15:00 (UTC+7)	Phawat Sakunkanchana 65'	Report	Piyakit Eangprayoon 28'; Tanadol Jansawang 63', 70'	Stadium: Mahasarakham Provincial Stadium; Attendance: 0 Referee: Thinakorn Daensamsuan; Assistant referees: Chawanat Chalachai, Waratchanon Chombun; Fourth official: Manuschai Chawong

29 September 2021	Nakhon Pathom United (T2)	6–1	Nonthaburi City (TA)	Mueang, Nakhon Pathom
17:30 (UTC+7)	Osvaldo Nascimento dos Santos Neto 5'; Léster Blanco 8'; Amir Ali Chegini 16', 60'; Kenzo Nambu 71', 73'	Report	Atikan Saenram 31'	Stadium: Stadium of Nakhon Pathom Municipality Sports School; Attendance: 0 Referee: Pawara Seejen; Assistant referees: Verayut Kunkure, Siwat Chaithong; Fourth official: Alongkorn Khonwai

29 September 2021	Navy (T2)	1–1 (5–6 p)	Rayong (T2)	Sattahip, Chonburi
18:00 (UTC+7)	Narutchai Nimboon 2'	Report	Ayu Lateh 18'	Stadium: Sattahip Navy Stadium; Attendance: 0 Referee: Boonsong Prachumrak; Assistant referees: Banpot Khunhong, Watcharasak Intharak; Fourth official: Veeraporn Maophaeo
	Penalties
	Goshi Okubo (penalty scored); Yuki Bamba (penalty scored); Saharat Rattanawijit (penalty scored); Warutchet Boonchuailuea (penalty scored); Surasak Koomkan (penalty scored); Nitikorn Pengsawat (penalty missed)		(penalty scored) Siwakorn Sangwong; (penalty scored) Teerapat Chaichoedchoo; (penalty scored) Thammawat Trailum; (penalty scored) Wattanapong Withunat; (penalty scored) Jetsada Simmana; (penalty scored) Naphat Jaruphutpukdee

29 September 2021	Rajpracha (T2)	9–0	Satun United (T3)	Thanyaburi, Pathum Thani
18:00 (UTC+7)	Thammayut Rakbun 1', 59'; Jardel Capistrano 12', 25'; Srithai Bookok 52'; Sarawin Saengra 55'; Douglas Mineiro 66'; Ronnayod Mingmitwan 85'; Wongwat Joroentaveesuk 90+3'	Report		Stadium: BG Stadium; Attendance: 0 Referee: Suriyo Kanhachalee; Assistant referees: Chaowalit Poonprasit, Khomchalach Lekhawijit; Fourth official: Putthipong Issising

29 September 2021	Chainat Hornbill (T2)	1–1 (4–2 p)	Nakhon Si United (T3)	Mueang, Chai Nat
18:00 (UTC+7)	Pharanyu Upala 45+2'	Report	Erivelto 4'	Stadium: Khao Plong Stadium; Attendance: 475; Referee: Wirot Oupachit; Assistant referees: Tussanai Sarobon, Kriangsak Pimsanit; Fourth official: Peerasan Krataithong
	Penalties
	Arthit Huailuek (penalty scored); Fittaree Khadearee (penalty missed); Chetsada Maungkam (penalty scored); Pooridech Poosampao (penalty scored); Atthaphon Pannakhen (penalty scored)		(penalty missed) Erivelto; (penalty scored) Nattapoom Maya; (penalty scored) Phillerson Natan Silva de Oliveira; (penalty missed) Thaned Benyapad

29 September 2021	Lamphun Warriors (T2)	2–0	Kasetsart (T2)	Mueang, Lamphun
19:00 (UTC+7)	Anuntachok Yodsangwal 21'; Tongchai Ponang 90+3'	Report		Stadium: Lamphun Provincial Stadium; Attendance: 0 Referee: Direk Kaort; Assistant referees: Apichat Prasasak, Songrit Trakulchai; Fourth official: Piyapong Thongkhain

6 October 2021	Customs Ladkrabang United (T2)	7–0	Mashare Chaiyaphum (T3)	Bang Phli, Samut Prakan
16:00 (UTC+7)	Khoiree Layeng 20'; Jhetsada Chankheoa 23' (o.g.); Tossakorn Boonpen 27'; Mahamasufiya Sani 50'; Warut Bunsuk 56', 78'; Kittiwut Bouloy 73' (pen.)	Report		Stadium: Customs Department Stadium; Attendance: 10; Referee: Veeraporn Maophaeo; Assistant referees: Phariwat Phoyoo, Pongsira Phuangket; Fourth official: Putthipong Issising

=== First round ===
The first round would be featured 30 clubs that were the winners of the qualification round including 10 clubs from T2, 15 clubs from T3, and 5 clubs from TA and the new entries including 16 clubs from 2021–22 Thai League 1, 3 clubs from 2021–22 Thai League 2, 7 clubs from 2021–22 Thai League 3, and 8 clubs from Thailand Amateur League. This round had drawn on 1 October 2021. There are 155 goals that occurred in this round.

27 October 2021	Songkhla (T3)	5–1	Pluakdaeng United (T3)	Mueang, Songkhla
15:00 (UTC+7)	Nititorn Sripramarn 8', 43'; Alberto Moreira Gouvea 10', 55'; Anooruk Suepsunthon 78'	Report	Kritthanaphong Paisanakkarapol 45+3' (pen.)	Stadium: Tinsulanon Stadium; Attendance: 224; Referee: Anwa Hayiyusoh; Assistant referees: Heesham Doloh, Prasertsak Santiphithakphakdee; Fourth official: Samran Phaysam

27 October 2021	Kasem Bundit University (T3)	3–1	Chaturapakpiman (TA)	Minburi, Bangkok
15:00 (UTC+7)	Anusak Laosangthai 6', 19'; Ranieri Luiz Barbosa 36'	Report	Rachapol Seepikul 44'	Stadium: Stadium of Kasem Bundit University; Attendance: 0 Referee: Poomnapat Athan; Assistant referees: Anucha Kaewpasit, Wanmethee Suvitayasatian; Fourth official: Kittisak Khotpanya

27 October 2021	Roi-et 2018 (TA)	1–2 (a.e.t.)	Kanchanaburi (T3)	Mueang, Roiet
15:00 (UTC+7)	Anuchar Sangpol 52'	Report	Anuluk Yeunhan 87', 116'	Stadium: Roiet Provincial Stadium; Attendance: 220; Referee: Ratchawat Meeboon; Assistant referees: Suriyawong Ramsri, Watchara Wongkhan; Fourth official: Samart Kaikaew

27 October 2021	Marines Eureka (T3)	2–3	Mahasarakham (T3)	Sattahip, Chonburi
15:00 (UTC+7)	Sorravit Saisom 31'; Sarayut Kiewpear 78'	Report	Jirapong Chaiprom 4'; Nonthawat Chari 55', 62'	Stadium: Sattahip Navy Stadium; Attendance: 150; Referee: Booncharoen Phochai; Assistant referees: Suknipon Yuennan, Chaiwat Rupsa-at; Fourth official: Tiyaporn Thamsanit

27 October 2021	MBF Amphawa (TA)	1–22	Port (T1)	Mueang, Samut Songkhram
15:00 (UTC+7)	Amnad Thongsuk 55'	Report; Highlight	Sergio Suárez 1', 40'; David Rochela 6'; Nantawat Suankaew 14', 24', 34', 50', 59'; Bordin Phala 17', 22'; Pakorn Prempak 29'; Tanaboon Kesarat 32'; Nurul Sriyankem 45', 46', 56', 88'; Tanasith Siripala 61', 68', 74', 81'; Meechok Marhasaranukun 65'; Thitawee Aksornsri 86'	Stadium: Samut Songkhram Stadium; Attendance: 0 Referee: Anusorn Nookaew; Assistant referees: Natthaphon Mala, Suriya Lee-intr; Fourth official: Suttipong Tepa

27 October 2021	Udon United (T3)	0–2	BG Pathum United (T1)	Mueang, Udon Thani
15:00 (UTC+7)		Report; Highlight	Sumanya Purisai 2', 62'	Stadium: Stadium of Thailand National Sports University, Udon Thani Campus; Attendance: 510; Referee: Noppadet Mangngam; Assistant referees: Rachan Dawangpa, Kasama Loyma; Fourth official: Jirawit Phonkaew

27 October 2021	Grakcu Sai Mai United (T3)	1–1 (a.e.t.) (9–10 p)	Chainat United (T3)	Sai Mai, Bangkok
15:00 (UTC+7)	Pakawat Sakulpong 90+4' (pen.)	Report	Valci Júnior 70'	Stadium: Grakcu United Stadium; Attendance: 70; Referee: Kittipong Choolerd; Assistant referees: Kattiya Saphu, Sopon Boonlest; Fourth official: Dassakhon Hokla
	Penalties
	Theppatat Wantanaboon (penalty scored); John Steven Cabrera Ortiz (penalty scored); Techatorn Jamikorn (penalty scored); Pakawat Sakulpong (penalty scored); Supakhom Khongdee (penalty scored); Boonkawee Boonworamatee (penalty scored); Polkrit Poolpun (penalty scored); Wachirawit Kingkaew (penalty scored); Jettaphat Jaiphakdee (penalty scored); Ehsan Rajabi Jalil (penalty missed)		(penalty scored) Valci Júnior; (penalty scored) Peerapat Malila; (penalty scored) Farid Madsoh; (penalty scored) Satid Sriutai; (penalty scored) Boubacar Koné; (penalty scored) Teeraphon Sangdech; (penalty scored) Keradit Borimart; (penalty scored) Ratthapon Sanapadung; (penalty scored) Anusorn Chansod; (penalty scored) Henri Jöel

27 October 2021	The PS Planet Team (TA)	0–6	Rasisalai United (TA)	Bang Sai, Ayutthaya
15:00 (UTC+7)		Report	Saksorn Phocha 2' (o.g.); Nattapon Yongsakool 9', 37'; Baphit Chooklin 49'; Supab Muengchan 82'; Natchanon Yongsakool 90+2'	Stadium: Ratchakram Stadium; Attendance: 450; Referee: Wisarut Kantawong; Assistant referees: Jirayu Jonganuruk, Adisak Thongmaha; Fourth official: Nattphon Chuensamran

27 October 2021	Khon Kaen Mordindang (T3)	2–1 (a.e.t.)	Kamphaengphet (T3)	Mueang, Khon Kaen
15:00 (UTC+7)	Chinnakorn Janphai 18'; Pakawat Wongsrikaew 98'	Report	Punyaphat Autha 36'	Stadium: Stadium of Khon Kaen University; Attendance: 30; Referee: Saharat Juktirit; Assistant referees: Surachai Thongudom, Adisak Noktajan; Fourth official: Thinakorn Daensamsuan

27 October 2021	Nonthaburi United S.Boonmeerit (T3)	1–0	Rajpracha (T2)	Bang Yai, Nonthaburi
15:00 (UTC+7)	Woraphot Somsang 9'	Report		Stadium: Nonthaburi Provincial Stadium; Attendance: 150; Referee: Phitsanu Chusi; Assistant referees: Tussanai Sarobon, Jagkrit Kaenkaew; Fourth official: Pichit Thongjanmoon

27 October 2021	Chattrakan City (TA)	0–6	Nongbua Pitchaya (T1)	Wat Bot, Phitsanulok
15:00 (UTC+7)		Report	Apiwat Pengprakon 13' (pen.), 59', 81'; Kritsana Kasemkulvilai 37'; Warakorn Thongbai 87', 90+1'	Stadium: H2H Sport Stadium; Attendance: 126; Referee: Kristin Saisombat; Assistant referees: Kanchit Nittayachart, Pramote Boon-in; Fourth official: Putthipong Issising

27 October 2021	Prime Bangkok (T3)	1–1 (a.e.t.) (5–4 p)	Pathumthani University (T3)	Lam Luk Ka, Pathum Thani
15:00 (UTC+7)	Omae So 83'	Report	Wasan Soontonwat 74'	Stadium: Thupatemi Stadium; Attendance: 0 Referee: Pornlap Bumrungthai; Assistant referees: Apichat Tawanboekfa, Kiadtisak Janmol; Fourth official: Wilawan Rattanakhot
	Penalties
	Omae So (penalty scored); Patiharn Suananan (penalty scored); Kieron Burrell (penalty scored); Sirisak Promduang (penalty scored); Natthapong Promorn (penalty scored)		(penalty scored) Phakpoom Malirungruang; (penalty missed) Wasan Soontonwat; (penalty scored) Witsarut Sriburin; (penalty scored) Surachai Nueangphak; (penalty scored) Suchon Sanguandee

27 October 2021	MH Nakhon Si (TA)	1–4	Muangthong United (T1)	Wiang Sa, Surat Thani
15:00 (UTC+7)	Worawut Sisahwat 62'	Report; Highlight	Poramet Arjvirai 16', 86'; Teeraphol Yoryoei 36', 90+3'	Stadium: Bansong Stadium; Attendance: 500; Referee: Kotchapoom Meesridaecha; Assistant referees: Rachain Srichai, Teerapon Sunyapluem; Fourth official: Sapuding Kalong

27 October 2021	Chiangrai Dragon (TA)	0–2	Police Tero (T1)	Mueang, Chiangrai
15:00 (UTC+7)		Report	Denis Darbellay 67'; Nattawut Munsuwan 90+1'	Stadium: Chiangrai Provincial Stadium; Attendance: 0 Referee: Panumas Phansamo; Assistant referees: Worapong Prasartsri, Srisuwan Boonnum; Fourth official: Piyapong Thongkhain

27 October 2021	Pattaya Dolphins United (T3)	3–2	Chainat Hornbill (T2)	Bang Lamung, Chonburi
15:00 (UTC+7)	Suksan Bunta 32'; Pedro Augusto Silva Rodrigues 45+2'; Suphakij Niamkong 58'	Report	Pooridech Poosampao 20'; Tanasorn Janthrakhot 63'	Stadium: Nong Prue Stadium; Attendance: 316; Referee: Pawara Seejen; Assistant referees: Pakorn Srichumsin, Supawan Hinthong; Fourth official: Worapon Sanjan

27 October 2021	KDC Solution (TA)	0–4	Phitsanulok (T3)	Mueang, Loei
15:00 (UTC+7)		Report	Watcharin Yailoet 21'; Authen Lekrat 35', 47'; Kunburus Sounses 71'	Stadium: Blue Dragon Mueang Loei Stadium; Attendance: 0 Referee: Manuschai Chawong; Assistant referees: Nattapong Wadweangcom, Sutiwat Kaewkhunthong; Fourth official: Sittichai Saramai

27 October 2021	Bangkok (T3)	3–0	See Khwae City (T3)	Thung Khru, Bangkok
15:00 (UTC+7)	Peter Sørensen Nedergaard 23'; Siwa Phommas 28'; Lee Jung-jin 48'	Report		Stadium: 72nd Anniversary Stadium; Attendance: 33; Referee: Danai Yommool; Assistant referees: Kittinan Sotorphrphakorn, Surathat Sanont; Fourth official: Kriangkrai Thiphanunjarukorn

27 October 2021	Prachinburi City (TA)	0–8	Lamphun Warriors (T2)	Mueang, Prachinburi
15:00 (UTC+7)		Report	Tiago Chulapa 2', 42'; Sarawut Sintupun 54', 90+1'; Ronnachai Rangsiyo 77', 88'; Anuntachok Yodsangwal 89'; Jeerachai Ladadok 90+5'	Stadium: Prachinburi Provincial Stadium; Attendance: 108; Referee: Veeraporn Maophaeo; Assistant referees: Sila Jinnigorn, Kantrakorn Ngaosri; Fourth official: Virittpol Pluemsilp

27 October 2021	Khon Kaen (T2)	0–3	Bangkok United (T1)	Mueang, Khon Kaen
17:00 (UTC+7)		Report; Highlight	Chananan Pombuppha 16', 60'; Nattawut Suksum 56'	Stadium: Khon Kaen PAO. Stadium; Attendance: 516; Referee: Teetichai Nualjan; Assistant referees: Chaiya Sripak, Anupong Sangtopo; Fourth official: Prakasit Chantarasawang

27 October 2021	Lampang (T2)	2–0	MH Khon Surat City (T3)	Mueang, Lampang
17:00 (UTC+7)	Chawin Thirawatsri 78'; Andrey Coutinho 84'	Report		Stadium: Lampang Provincial Stadium; Attendance: 129; Referee: Wirot Oupachit; Assistant referees: Songrit Trakulchai, Sornram Yutim; Fourth official: Woottipong Ketkam

27 October 2021	Nakhon Pathom United (T2)	1–0	Sukhothai (T2)	Mueang, Nakhon Pathom
17:30 (UTC+7)	Kenzo Nambu 47'	Report		Stadium: Stadium of Nakhon Pathom Municipality Sports School; Attendance: 150; Referee: Wicharn Klinthaworn; Assistant referees: Chaiyos Sripak, Nuannid Donjangreed; Fourth official: Phadoongkiat Piangdee

27 October 2021	Chiangrai United (T1)	12–0	Nan City (TA)	Mueang, Chiangrai
17:30 (UTC+7)	Akarawin Sawasdee 2', 10', 36'; Nattawut Jaroenboot 39'; Sanukran Thinjom 43', 54'; Chotipat Poomkaew 79', 89'; Sivakorn Tiatrakul 81', 87'; Sarawut Inpaen 83'; Cho Ji-hun 90+1'	Report; Highlight		Stadium: Leo Chiangrai Stadium; Attendance: 0 Referee: Chaireag Ngam-som; Assistant referees: Rawut Nakarit, Waranyoo Chomgoson; Fourth official: Direk Kaort

27 October 2021	Suphanburi (T1)	3–0	Chiangrai (TA)	Mueang, Suphanburi
18:00 (UTC+7)	Sihanart Sutisuk 61'; Lossémy Karaboué 77'; Ratchanat Arunyapairot 90+3'	Report		Stadium: Suphanburi Provincial Stadium; Attendance: 173; Referee: Paisan Bendem-alee; Assistant referees: Chotrawee Tongduang, Sumate Peasiri; Fourth official: Suwat Wongsuwan

27 October 2021	Chiangmai (T2)	2–3	Muang Loei United (T3)	Mueang, Chiangmai
18:00 (UTC+7)	Veljko Filipović 14'; Watcharin Nuengprakaew 41'	Report	Alexandre Balotelli 25', 83'; Aphiwat Hanchai 79'	Stadium: Chiangmai Municipality Stadium; Attendance: 0 Referee: Wathanyu Morin; Assistant referees: Anucha Pinamon, Sarayut Sriampri; Fourth official: Poowasak Sukunt

27 October 2021	Phrae United (T2)	0–3	Buriram United (T1)	Mueang, Phrae
18:00 (UTC+7)		Report; Highlight	Maicon 17'; Samuel 25'; Supachai Chaided 54'	Stadium: Huai Ma Stadium; Attendance: 1,500; Referee: Natee Choosuwan; Assistant referees: Komsan Kampan, Narin Wongprapipak; Fourth official: Natthawut Tasmak

27 October 2021	Muangkan United (T2)	0–3	Nakhon Ratchasima Mazda (T1)	Mueang, Kanchanaburi
18:00 (UTC+7)		Report; Highlight	Nattachai Srisuwan 26'; Dennis Villanueva 35'; Kwame Karikari 43'	Stadium: Kanchanaburi Provincial Stadium; Attendance: 551; Referee: Akom Charoensuk; Assistant referees: Poonsawat Samransuk, Binla Preeda; Fourth official: Satchukorn Saenchu

27 October 2021	Samut Prakan City (T1)	4–1	PT Prachuap (T1)	Bang Sao Thong, Samut Prakan
18:00 (UTC+7)	Chayawat Srinawong 38'; Eliandro 44', 45+1'; Daisuke Sakai 84'	Report	Weerawut Kayem 61'	Stadium: Samut Prakan Stadium; Attendance: 173; Referee: Warintron Sassadee; Assistant referees: Vichet Getkaew, Yossapon Tongprom; Fourth official: Chaikrit Inboonsong

27 October 2021	Chonburi (T1)	4–0	Udon Thani (T2)	Mueang, Chonburi
18:00 (UTC+7)	Renato Kelić 57'; Rangsan Wiroonsri 63'; Chitsanupong Choti 88'; Phithak Phimpae 90+1'	Report; Highlight		Stadium: Chonburi Stadium; Attendance: 1,521; Referee: Vitsavet Sangnakorn; Assistant referees: Phubes Lekpha, Kitisak Pikunngoen; Fourth official: Suriyo Kanhachalee

27 October 2021	Chiangmai United (T1)	7–0	Thawi Watthana Samut Sakhon United (T3)	Mae Rim, Chiangmai
18:00 (UTC+7)	Surawich Logarwit 12'; Poonsak Masuk 41'; Saharat Kanyaroj 43', 56'; Tossaporn Chuchin 45'; Kittipat Wongsombat 54'; Kabfah Boonmatoon 78'	Report		Stadium: 700th Anniversary of Chiangmai Stadium; Attendance: 295; Referee: Tastarawut Khantavichai; Assistant referees: Wirot Lokham, Apichat Prasasak; Fourth official: Peerasan Krataithong

27 October 2021	Ratchaburi Mitr Phol (T1)	8–1	Customs Ladkrabang United (T2)	Mueang, Ratchaburi
18:00 (UTC+7)	Sébastien Wüthrich 13', 29', 59'; Steeven Langil 30', 56'; Jakkapan Pornsai 33', 44'; Thanathon Chanphet 82'	Report	Choe Hoju 89'	Stadium: Mitr Phol Stadium; Attendance: 252; Referee: Winat Phophat; Assistant referees: Watthana Chonchanakul, Banpot Khunhong; Fourth official: Komgrit Ponpasit

27 October 2021	Rayong (T2)	0–1	Khon Kaen United (T1)	Mueang, Rayong
18:00 (UTC+7)		Report	Suwat Junboonpha 21' (o.g.)	Stadium: PTT Stadium; Attendance: 190; Referee: Songkran Bunmeekiart; Assistant referees: Chaowalit Poonprasit, Ruangsak Nupuak; Fourth official: U-sen Yala

27 October 2021	Uthai Thani (T3)	7–0	Don Mueang Metropolitan Police Station (TA)	Mueang, Uthai Thani
18:00 (UTC+7)	Anuchon Phanduong 28' (o.g.); Phattharaphon Junsuwan 41'; Kirati Keawsombat 55', 73'; Nontapat Naksawat 61'; Peemvit Thongnitiroj 67'; Ricardo Santos 87'	Report		Stadium: Uthai Thani Provincial Stadium; Attendance: 157; Referee: Thanison Onjiw; Assistant referees: Attapon Bolen, Nonthanan Khanthawong; Fourth official: Sirikron Lorboon

=== Second round ===
The second round would be featured 32 clubs that were the winners of the first round including 15 clubs from T1, 3 clubs from T2, 13 clubs from T3, and 1 club from TA. This round had drawn on 1 November 2021. There are 69 goals that occurred in this round.

24 November 2021	Phitsanulok (T3)	1–4	Uthai Thani (T3)	Mueang, Phitsanulok
15:00 (UTC+7)	Natthawut Nueamai 82'	Report	Ricardo Santos 19', 90+4'; Phattharaphon Junsuwan 52'; Nontapat Naksawat 71'	Stadium: Phitsanulok PAO. Stadium; Attendance: 750; Referee: Chalit Ploypech; Assistant referees: Attapon Bolen, Suthipong Ontuwong; Fourth official: Supacha Chomchid

24 November 2021	Mahasarakham (T3)	0–2 (a.e.t.)	Muangthong United (T1)	Mueang, Mahasarakham
15:00 (UTC+7)		Report; Highlight	Umphol Rosoongnern 100' (o.g.); Sorawit Panthong 120+2'	Stadium: Mahasarakham Provincial Stadium; Attendance: 1,494; Referee: Winat Phophat; Assistant referees: Rachan Dawangpa, Kanchit Nittayachart; Fourth official: Sahapop Sriboonlue

24 November 2021	Muang Loei United (T3)	0–2	BG Pathum United (T1)	Mueang, Loei
15:00 (UTC+7)		Report; Highlight	Chatree Chimtalay 20', 30'	Stadium: Blue Dragon Mueang Loei Stadium; Attendance: 457; Referee: Sarayut Jakngoen; Assistant referees: Worapong Prasartsri, Waranyoo Chomgoson; Fourth official: Somkhid Sarapim

24 November 2021	Songkhla (T3)	5–1	Khon Kaen Mordindang (T3)	Mueang, Songkhla
15:00 (UTC+7)	Nititorn Sripramarn 12'; Peerapat Kantha 22', 78'; Akarawit Saemaram 84'; Phongchana Kongkirit 90+3'	Report	Danunai Wongwang 36'	Stadium: Tinsulanon Stadium; Attendance: 530; Referee: Watcharin Nootong; Assistant referees: Kodchakon Chumjai, Chanason Nurat; Fourth official: Pissanusak Sriyai

24 November 2021	Bangkok (T3)	1–3 (a.e.t.)	Lamphun Warriors (T2)	Thung Khru, Bangkok
15:00 (UTC+7)	Somsak Musikaphan 68'	Report	Tana Sripandorn 6'; Kissakorn Krasaingoen 96' (o.g.); Ronnachai Rangsiyo 107'	Stadium: 72nd Anniversary Stadium; Attendance: 200; Referee: Pawara Seejen; Assistant referees: Poramin Yoopensuk, Sadsampan Kunsakoo; Fourth official: Wichate Tainthong

24 November 2021	Kanchanaburi (T3)	2–4	Port (T1)	Mueang, Kanchanaburi
15:00 (UTC+7)	Lucas Massaro Garcia Gama 24', 86' (pen.)	Report; Highlight	Sergio Suárez 14', 17'; Nelson Bonilla 34'; Adisorn Promrak 56'	Stadium: Kanchanaburi Municipality Stadium; Attendance: 291; Referee: Torphong Somsing; Assistant referees: Narin Wongprapipak, Banpot Khunhong; Fourth official: Boonsong Prachumrak

24 November 2021	Police Tero (T1)	1–0	Khon Kaen United (T1)	Lak Si, Bangkok
17:00 (UTC+7)	Teeratep Winothai 90+4'	Report; Highlight		Stadium: Boonyachinda Stadium; Attendance: 329; Referee: Sivakorn Pu-udom; Assistant referees: Rawut Nakarit, Watthana Chonchanakul; Fourth official: Kristin Saisombat

24 November 2021	Nakhon Ratchasima Mazda (T1)	1–0 (a.e.t.)	Nakhon Pathom United (T2)	Mueang, Nakhon Ratchasima
18:00 (UTC+7)	Amir Ali Chegini 109' (o.g.)	Report		Stadium: 80th Birthday Stadium; Attendance: 1,526; Referee: Wiwat Jumpaoon; Assistant referees: Tanate Chuchuen, Natthaphon Mala; Fourth official: Jirawit Phonkaew

24 November 2021	Suphanburi (T1)	3–0	Chainat United (T3)	Mueang, Suphanburi
18:00 (UTC+7)	Wasawat Koedsri 10'; Sitthichok Mool-on 19'; Danilo Alves 90+2'	Report		Stadium: Suphanburi Provincial Stadium; Attendance: 304; Referee: Kotchapoom Meesridaecha; Assistant referees: Komsan Kampan, Teerapon Sunyapluem; Fourth official: Chaikrit Inboonsong

24 November 2021	Lampang (T2)	9–6	Nonthaburi United S.Boonmeerit (T3)	Mueang, Lampang
18:00 (UTC+7)	Tebnimit Buransri 12'; Natthaphon Wisetchat 20'; Deyvison Fernandes de Oliveira 25', 81', 90'; Jakkrawut Songma 65', 69', 75'; Weerayut Srivichai 84'	Report	Dolvich Thanomnoom 47'; Jetsada Batchari 54', 81' (pen.); Chaimongkol Botnok 64', 90+4'; Kidsada Prissa 73' (o.g.)	Stadium: Lampang Provincial Stadium; Attendance: 223; Referee: Woottipong Ketkam; Assistant referees: Anucha Pinamon, Kantrakorn Ngaosri; Fourth official: Direk Kaort

24 November 2021	Chiangmai United (T1)	2–1	Chonburi (T1)	Mae Rim, Chiangmai
18:00 (UTC+7)	Kritsada Kaman 39' (o.g.); Saharat Kanyaroj 48'	Report; Highlight	Gidi Kanyuk 88'	Stadium: 700th Anniversary of Chiangmai Stadium; Attendance: 1,249; Referee: Noppadet Mangngam; Assistant referees: Tanin Reunjit, Srisuwan Boonnum; Fourth official: Piyapong Thongkhain

24 November 2021	Samut Prakan City (T1)	2–0	Rasisalai United (TA)	Bang Sao Thong, Samut Prakan
18:00 (UTC+7)	Thitiphong Photumtha 4' (o.g.); Sarayut Sompim 87'	Report		Stadium: Samut Prakan Stadium; Attendance: 235; Referee: Paisan Bendem-alee; Assistant referees: Chotrawee Tongduang, Rachain Srichai; Fourth official: U-sen Yala

24 November 2021	Buriram United (T1)	5–0	Prime Bangkok (T3)	Mueang, Buriram
18:00 (UTC+7)	Samuel 32'; Maicon 45+2'; Apiwat Ngaolamhin 62'; Chakkit Laptrakul 66'; Chutipol Thongthae 69'	Report; Highlight		Stadium: Chang Arena; Attendance: 4,047; Referee: Vitsavet Sangnakorn; Assistant referees: Poonsawat Samransuk, Kasama Loyma; Fourth official: Satchukorn Saenchu

24 November 2021	Nongbua Pitchaya (T1)	4–1	Kasem Bundit University (T3)	Mueang, Nongbua Lamphu
18:00 (UTC+7)	Apiwat Pengprakon 13', 72', 90+1'; Sakda Nonphakdee 80'	Report	Ranieri Luiz Barbosa 5'	Stadium: Pitchaya Stadium; Attendance: 224; Referee: Phairot Bunkamnoed; Assistant referees: Apichit Nophuan, Suriya Lee-intr; Fourth official: Chaiya Moolmanee

24 November 2021	Ratchaburi Mitr Phol (T1)	0–4	Chiangrai United (T1)	Mueang, Ratchaburi
19:00 (UTC+7)		Report; Highlight	Phitiwat Sukjitthammakul 1'; Felipe Amorim 44', 61'; Akarawin Sawasdee 52'	Stadium: Mitr Phol Stadium; Attendance: 705; Referee: Mongkolchai Pechsri; Assistant referees: Pattarapong Kijsathit, Kitisak Pikunngoen; Fourth official: Wicharn Klinthaworn

24 November 2021	Bangkok United (T1)	5–0	Pattaya Dolphins United (T3)	Khlong Luang, Pathum Thani
19:00 (UTC+7)	Anthony Carter 35'; Heberty 38' (pen.); Vander 45'; Anon Amornlerdsak 73'; Chananan Pombuppha 90+2'	Report; Highlight		Stadium: Thammasat Stadium; Attendance: 579; Referee: Natee Choosuwan; Assistant referees: Chaowalit Poonprasit, Wirot Lokham; Fourth official: Komgrit Ponpasit

=== Third round ===
The third round would be featured 16 clubs that were the winners of the second round including 12 clubs from T1, 2 clubs from T2, and 2 clubs from T3. This round had drawn on 14 December 2021. There are 22 goals that occurred in this round.

19 January 2022	Buriram United (T1)	4–1	Chiangrai United (T1)	Mueang, Buriram
17:00 (UTC+7)	Jonathan Bolingi 15' (pen.); Rebin Sulaka 28'; Maicon 80' (pen.), 90+3'	Report; Highlight	Chotipat Poomkaew 59'	Stadium: Chang Arena; Attendance: 5,070; Referee: Chaireag Ngam-som; Assistant referees: Worapong Prasartsri, Rachan Dawangpa; Fourth official: Chaikrit Inboonsong

19 January 2022	Songkhla (T3)	1–1 (a.e.t.) (10–9 p)	Samut Prakan City (T1)	Mueang, Songkhla
17:00 (UTC+7)	Teerayut Ngamlamai 117'	Report; Highlight	Yutpichai Lertlam 116'	Stadium: Tinsulanon Stadium; Attendance: 2,163; Referee: Kotchapoom Meesridaecha; Assistant referees: Tanin Reunjit, Teerapon Sunyapluem; Fourth official: Phitsanu Chusi
	Penalties
	Akarawit Saemaram (penalty scored); Anooruk Suepsunthon (penalty scored); Noto Boontawan (penalty scored); Yodsawat Montha (penalty scored); Mairon Natan Pereira Maciel Oliveira (penalty scored); Wattanasupt Jarernsri (penalty scored); Oscar Karl (penalty scored); Apipoo Suntornpanavej (penalty scored); Teerayut Ngamlamai (penalty scored); Abdulhakim Jehsani (penalty scored)		(penalty scored) Daisuke Sakai; (penalty scored) Yuto Ono; (penalty scored) Aris Zarifović; (penalty scored) Suphanan Bureerat; (penalty scored) Chaiyawat Buran; (penalty scored) Saksit Jitvijan; (penalty scored) Jiraaut Wingwon; (penalty scored) Phatsaphon Choedwichit; (penalty scored) Kandanai Thawornsak; (penalty missed) Nopphon Ponkam

19 January 2022	Chiangmai United (T1)	2–3	Suphanburi (T1)	Mae Rim, Chiangmai
17:00 (UTC+7)	Bill 27'; Yannick Boli 85'	Report; Highlight	Danilo Alves 1', 11'; Sarawut Thorarit 90+3'	Stadium: 700th Anniversary of Chiangmai Stadium; Attendance: 838; Referee: Sarayut Jakngoen; Assistant referees: Rawut Nakarit, Kanchit Nittayachart; Fourth official: Wathanyu Morin

19 January 2022	Bangkok United (T1)	0–1	Police Tero (T1)	Khlong Luang, Pathum Thani
18:00 (UTC+7)		Report; Highlight	Evandro Paulista 80'	Stadium: Thammasat Stadium; Attendance: 832; Referee: Sivakorn Pu-udom; Assistant referees: Pattarapong Kijsathit, Banpot Khunhong; Fourth official: Boonsong Prachumrak

19 January 2022	Nakhon Ratchasima Mazda (T1)	3–1	Lampang (T2)	Mueang, Nakhon Ratchasima
18:00 (UTC+7)	Kwame Karikari 3', 30' (pen.); Nattachai Srisuwan 59'	Report; Highlight	Deyvison Fernandes de Oliveira 71'	Stadium: 80th Birthday Stadium; Attendance: 1,366; Referee: Songkran Bunmeekiart; Assistant referees: Apichit Nophuan, Tanate Chuchuen; Fourth official: Niwat Insa-ard

19 January 2022	Lamphun Warriors (T2)	awd.	Nongbua Pitchaya (T1)	Mueang, Lamphun
19:00 (UTC+7)		Report		Stadium: Lamphun Provincial Stadium; Referee: Paisan Bendem-alee; Assistant referees: Chotrawee Tongduang, Waranyoo Chomgoson; Fourth official: Piyapong Thongkhain

2 February 2022	Muangthong United (T1)	1–2 (a.e.t.)	Uthai Thani (T3)	Pak Kret, Nonthaburi
18:00 (UTC+7)	Willian Popp 42'	Report; Highlight	Phattharaphon Junsuwan 85'; Ricardo Santos 102'	Stadium: Thunderdome Stadium; Attendance: 996; Referee: Noppadet Mangngam; Assistant referees: Chaowalit Poonprasit, Banpot Khunhong; Fourth official: Kristin Saisombat

2 February 2022	BG Pathum United (T1)	2–0	Port (T1)	Thanyaburi, Pathum Thani
19:00 (UTC+7)	Ikhsan Fandi 26'; Teerasil Dangda 80'	Report; Highlight		Stadium: BG Stadium; Attendance: 3,221; Referee: Wiwat Jumpaoon; Assistant referees: Rachain Srichai, Phubes Lekpha; Fourth official: Wittaya Junejan

=== Quarter-finals ===
The quarter-finals would be featured 8 clubs that were the winners of the third round including 6 clubs from T1 and 2 clubs from T3. This round had drawn on 25 January 2022. There are 8 goals that occurred in this round.

16 February 2022	Suphanburi (T1)	1–0	Songkhla (T3)	Mueang, Suphanburi
17:00 (UTC+7)	Danilo Alves 14'	Report; Highlight		Stadium: Suphanburi Provincial Stadium; Attendance: 1,704; Referee: Songkran Bunmeekiart; Assistant referees: Watthana Chonchanakul, Phubes Lekpha; Fourth official: Noppadet Mangngam

16 February 2022	Uthai Thani (T3)	0–1	Nakhon Ratchasima Mazda (T1)	Mueang, Uthai Thani
18:00 (UTC+7)		Report; Highlight	Charlie Clough 87'	Stadium: Uthai Thani Provincial Stadium; Attendance: 856; Referee: Niwat Insa-ard; Assistant referees: Rachain Srichai, Kitisak Pikunngoen; Fourth official: Winat Phophat

16 February 2022	Buriram United (T1)	4–1	Nongbua Pitchaya (T1)	Mueang, Buriram
18:30 (UTC+7)	Jonathan Bolingi 4' (pen.), 57'; Ratthanakorn Maikami 35'; Ayub Masika 88'	Report; Highlight	Barros Tardeli 66'	Stadium: Chang Arena; Attendance: 5,316; Referee: Sarayut Jakngoen; Assistant referees: Rawut Nakarit, Natthaphon Mala; Fourth official: Kotchapoom Meesridaecha

16 February 2022	Police Tero (T1)	1–0 (a.e.t.)	BG Pathum United (T1)	Lak Si, Bangkok
19:00 (UTC+7)	Evandro Paulista 108'	Report; Highlight		Stadium: Boonyachinda Stadium; Attendance: 1,255; Referee: Natee Choosuwan; Assistant referees: Apichit Nophuan, Vichet Getkaew; Fourth official: Akom Charoensuk

=== Semi-finals ===
The semi-finals would be featured 4 clubs that were the winners of the quarter-finals, all are clubs from T1. This round had drawn on 21 April 2022. There are 8 goals that occurred in this round.

18 May 2022	Police Tero (T1)	1–2	Nakhon Ratchasima Mazda (T1)	Mueang, Ratchaburi
18:00 (UTC+7)	Arthit Boodjinda 19'	Report; Highlight	Kwame Karikari 45+2'; Nattachai Srisuwan 52'	Stadium: Mitr Phol Stadium; Attendance: 663; Referee: Mongkolchai Pechsri; Assistant referees: Pattarapong Kijsathit, Apichit Nophuan; Fourth official: Niwat Insa-ard

18 May 2022	Suphanburi (T1)	2–3	Buriram United (T1)	Mueang, Chonburi
19:00 (UTC+7)	Danilo Alves 35' (pen.), 64'	Report; Highlight	Supachok Sarachat 25', 28'; Suphanat Mueanta 72'	Stadium: Chonburi Stadium; Attendance: 2,155; Referee: Sarayut Jakngoen; Assistant referees: Tanate Chuchuen, Komsan Kampan; Fourth official: Vitsavet Sangnakorn

=== Final ===
The final would be featured 2 clubs that were the winners of the semi-finals, both are clubs from T1. There is 1 goal that occurred in this round.

22 May 2022	Buriram United (T1)	1–0 (a.e.t.)	Nakhon Ratchasima Mazda (T1)	Khlong Luang, Pathum Thani
18:00 (UTC+7)	Jonathan Bolingi 115'	Report; Highlight; Full match Ceremony		Stadium: Thammasat Stadium; Attendance: 7,734; Referee: Wiwat Jumpaoon; Assistant referees: Chotrawee Tongduang, Worapong Prasartsri; Fourth official: Kotchapoom Meesridaecha

== Tournament statistics ==
=== Top goalscorers ===
Rank	Player	Club	Goals
1	(Thailand) Apiwat Pengprakon	Nongbua Pitchaya	6
1	(Brazil) Danilo Alves	Suphanburi	6
3	(Thailand) Nantawat Suankaew	Port	5
4	(Democratic Republic of the Congo) Jonathan Bolingi	Buriram United	4
4	(Brazil) Maicon	Buriram United	4
4	(Thailand) Akarawin Sawasdee	Chiangrai United	4
4	(Brazil) Deyvison Fernandes de Oliveira	Lampang	4
4	(Ghana) Kwame Karikari	Nakhon Ratchasima Mazda	4
4	(Thailand) Nurul Sriyankem	Port	4
4	(Spain) Sergio Suárez	Port	4
4	(Thailand) Tanasith Siripala	Port	4
4	(Brazil) Ricardo Santos	Uthai Thani	4

=== Hat-tricks ===
Player	For	Against	Result	Date	Round
(Brazil) Caíque Freitas Ribeiro	Bangkok (T3)	Surin City (T3)	5–0 (H)	29 September 2021	Qualification round
(Argentina) Nicolás Vélez	Sukhothai (T2)	Banbueng (T3)	4–0 (A)	29 September 2021	Qualification round
(Thailand) Nantawat Suankaew^{5}	Port (T1)	MBF Amphawa (TA)	22–1 (A)	27 October 2021	First round
(Thailand) Nurul Sriyankem^{4}	Port (T1)	MBF Amphawa (TA)	22–1 (A)	27 October 2021	First round
(Thailand) Tanasith Siripala^{4}	Port (T1)	MBF Amphawa (TA)	22–1 (A)	27 October 2021	First round
(Thailand) Apiwat Pengprakon	Nongbua Pitchaya (T1)	Chattrakan City (TA)	6–0 (A)	27 October 2021	First round
(Thailand) Akarawin Sawasdee	Chiangrai United (T1)	Nan City (TA)	12–0 (H)	27 October 2021	First round
(Switzerland) Sébastien Wüthrich	Ratchaburi Mitr Phol (T1)	Customs Ladkrabang United (T2)	8–1 (H)	27 October 2021	First round
(Brazil) Deyvison Fernandes de Oliveira	Lampang (T2)	Nonthaburi United S.Boonmeerit (T3)	9–6 (H)	24 November 2021	Second round
(Thailand) Jakkrawut Songma	Lampang (T2)	Nonthaburi United S.Boonmeerit (T3)	9–6 (H)	24 November 2021	Second round
(Thailand) Apiwat Pengprakon	Nongbua Pitchaya (T1)	Kasem Bundit University (T3)	4–1 (H)	24 November 2021	Second round

Notes: ^{5} = Player scored 5 goals; ^{4} = Player scored 4 goals; (H) = Home team; (A) = Away team

== See also ==
- 2021–22 Thai League 1
- 2021–22 Thai League 2
- 2021–22 Thai League 3
- 2021–22 Thai League 3 Northern Region
- 2021–22 Thai League 3 Northeastern Region
- 2021–22 Thai League 3 Eastern Region
- 2021–22 Thai League 3 Western Region
- 2021–22 Thai League 3 Southern Region
- 2021–22 Thai League 3 Bangkok Metropolitan Region
- 2021–22 Thai League 3 National Championship
- 2021–22 Thai League Cup
- 2021 Thailand Champions Cup
