= Apiwat =

Apiwat (RTGS: Aphiwat) is a Thai given name. Notable people with the name include:

- Apiwat Chaemcharoen (born 1991), futsal player
- Apiwat Ngaolamhin (born 1986), footballer
- Apiwat Pengprakon (born 1988), footballer
- Apiwat Saisoi (born 1983), footballer
- Apiwat Ueathavornsuk (born 1982), singer-songwriter
- Apiwat Wongthananon (born 1994), motorcycle racer

== See also ==
- Krung Thep Aphiwat Central Terminal, the current central station of Bangkok
