= Kesarat =

Kesarat is a surname. Notable people with the surname include:

- Tanaboon Kesarat (born 1993), Thai football player
- Somjets Kesarat (born 1980), Thai football player
