= Aekkaphop Saensra =

Thai footballer

Personal information
- Date of birth: February 8, 1994 (age 32)
- Place of birth: Chaiyaphum, Thailand
- Height: 1.74 m (5 ft 8 1/2 in)
- Position: Forward

Youth career
- 2009–2011: Bangkok Glass

Senior career*
Years	Team	Apps	(Gls)
2011–2012	Buriram PEA	0	(0)
2012	→ Songkhla United (loan)	11	(2)
2012–2014	Bangkok Glass	1	(0)
2015	Phichit		
2015	Loei City		
2015–2017	Ubon Ratchathani		
2018–2019	Khon Kaen		

International career
2012	Thailand U19		
- * Club domestic league appearances and goals as of 13 October 2013

Aekkaphop Saensra (Thai: เอกภพ แสนสระ) is a Thai footballer.

== Honours ==
=== Clubs ===
Buriram United

- U-19 Thailand Championship Champions; 2012
- U-19 Thailand Championship MVP; 2012
