= Nopphon Lakhonphon =

Thai footballer (born 2000)

Personal information
- Full name: Nopphon Lakhonphon
- Date of birth: 19 July 2000 (age 26)
- Place of birth: Buriram, Thailand
- Height: 1.80 m (5 ft 11 in)
- Position: Goalkeeper

Team information
- Current team: Ratchaburi (on loan from Buriram United)

Youth career
- 2012–2019: Buriram United

Senior career*
Years	Team	Apps	(Gls)
2019–	Buriram United	16	(0)
2019	→ Lampang (loan)	33	(0)
2020–2021	→ Nakhon Pathom United (loan)	29	(0)
2024–2025	→ Nakhon Si United (loan)	22	(0)
2025–2026	→ Nakhon Ratchasima (loan)	12	(0)
2026–	→ Ratchaburi (loan)	0	(0)

International career
2018	Thailand U19	12	(0)
2022–2023	Thailand U23	4	(0)
- * Club domestic league appearances and goals as of 1 July 2026

Nopphon Lakhonphon (Thai: นพพล ละครพล, born 19 July 2000) is a Thai professional footballer who plays as a goalkeeper for Thai League 1 club Ratchaburi, on loan from Buriram United.

== Club career ==
At the age of twelve, he entered trials and was selected for the youth academy of Buriram United. He attended secondary school at Phattharaborphit School (near the Buriram United Academy), and played for the school and the youth club. The team won the U-19 Thailand Championship ("Coke Cup") in 2017, where Nopphon was named Best Goalkeeper.

Nopphon had an appearance with Buriram's senior team as early as age fifteen, when he was brought on at the 86th minute in a friendly match against the Laos National Team. That year, he was included in Buriram United's roster for the second leg of the Thai League, making him the youngest player in the country's top league. Nopphon regularly appeared for the Buriram United B Team in 2017, when the Thai League began allowing clubs to field secondary teams in the Thai League 4. He was loaned to Lampang for the 2019 season. He was in goal 33 times for the second division club from Lampang. Immediately afterwards, he was loaned to Nakhon Pathom United from Nakhon Pathom, who had recently been promoted to the second division, in early 2020. With Nakhon Pathom he was third in the table and thus qualified for the promotion games to the first division. For Nakhon Pathom he completed 29 second division games. He returned to Buriram at the end of May 2021. At the end of the 2021/22 season he celebrated the Thai championship with Buriram.

== International career ==
In May 2018, he was called up to the U19 National Team for the 2018 AFF U-19 Youth Championship. However, he was heavily criticized for his performance in October's 2018 AFC U-19 Championship, where Thailand conceded an equalizing goal at the 87th minute and ultimately lost 3–7 to Qatar in the quarterfinals, missing their chance at the U-20 World Cup.

In March 2019, He was called up to the U23 National Team for the 2020 AFC U-23 Championship qualification and 2019 Merlion Cup, but was dropped for the 2019 SEA Games. In 2022, he was called up to the U23 team for the 2022 AFC U-23 Asian Cup.

== Honours ==
Buriram United

- Thai League 1 (2): 2016–17, 2021–22, 2022–23, 2023–24
- Thai FA Cup (2): 2021–22, 2022–23
- Thai League Cup (2): 2021–22, 2022–23
