= Ricardo Bueno =

Brazilian footballer

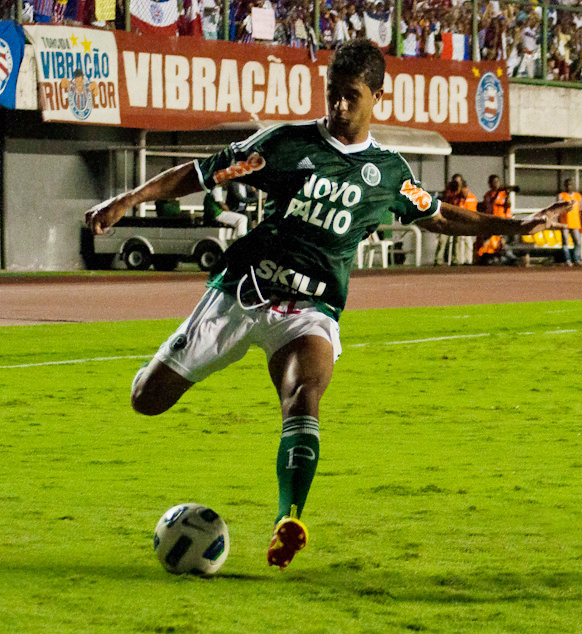
- Ricardo Bueno playing for Palmeiras in 2011

Personal information
- Full name: Ricardo Bueno da Silva
- Date of birth: 15 August 1987 (age 39)
- Place of birth: São Paulo, Brazil
- Height: 1.83 m (6 ft 0 in)
- Position: Forward

Team information
- Current team: Confiança
- Number: 9

Youth career
- América-SP

Senior career*
Years	Team	Apps	(Gls)
2007	Nacional-PR		
2008–2009	Londrina	7	(5)
2008	→ Francisco Beltrão (loan)		
2009–2010	Grêmio	0	(0)
2010	→ Oeste (loan)	19	(16)
2010–2012	Atlético Mineiro	24	(5)
2011–2012	→ Palmeiras (loan)	26	(4)
2012	Atlético Goianiense	15	(2)
2013	FC Nordsjælland	10	(0)
2013–2014	Figueirense	30	(12)
2015	Seongnam	16	(2)
2015	Joinville	5	(1)
2016	Oeste	24	(8)
2017	São Bento	11	(5)
2017	Santa Cruz	29	(6)
2018	Red Bull Brasil	7	(0)
2018	São Bento	10	(3)
2018–2019	Ceará	20	(7)
2019	CSA	23	(4)
2020	Buriram United	4	(2)
2020–2021	Operário Ferroviário	38	(16)
2021–2022	Juventude	35	(9)
2023	Avaí	6	(0)
2023–	Confiança	0	(0)
- * Club domestic league appearances and goals as of 13 August 2022

Ricardo Bueno da Silva (born 15 August 1987), known as Ricardo Bueno, is a Brazilian footballer who plays as a forward for Confiança.

== Career ==
Born in São Paulo, Ricardo started his youth career playing for América-SP, from São José do Rio Preto, São Paulo.

He was spotted by a scout that took him to Paraná, where he first played professional football for Nacional-PR, a local club from the city of Rolândia. After some good appearances, Londrina, a bigger club from Paraná, bought him in 2008. He played few games for Londrina because of a right thigh injury, which sidelined him for ten months. Still, in seven games in the 2009 Campeonato Paranaense, he scored five goals.

On 22 April 2009, Ricardo was transferred to Grêmio, a big Brazilian club from Rio Grande do Sul. He failed to make his debut for the club and was mostly on the bench.

In 2010, he was loaned to Oeste, a São Paulo state club. He made great appearances and was the top goalscorer of the 2010 Campeonato Paulista, with 16 goals in 19 matches.

After the successful campaign in the Paulistão 2010, Ricardo was transferred to Atlético Mineiro, who bought 45% of their economic rights, with the other 55% still being of Grêmio. He played many games for Atlético Mineiro in 2010, scoring a few goals, but in 2011 he failed to claim his place in the starting 11 due to injury and due to the arrival of many strikers for the season.

Palmeiras stated interest in Ricardo in August 2011, and brought him in the end of the month along with Fernandão, another striker. Ricardo was later released from Palmeiras not even a year later.

On 25 January 2013, Bueno joined the defending Danish league champions FC Nordsjælland on loan, on a contract running until the summer of 2013, after which the club can make it a permanent move. On 20 January 2014, Bueno joined Seongnam FC of K League Classic in South Korea

On 19 December 2019, it was confirmed that Bueno would join the Thai league club Buriram United for the 2020 season.

== Career statistics ==
As of 29 November 2021

Club	Season	League			State League		Cup		Continental		Other		Total	
Club	Season	Division	Apps	Goals	Apps	Goals	Apps	Goals	Apps	Goals	Apps	Goals	Apps	Goals
Londrina	2009	Paranaense	—		7	5	—		—		—		7	5
Grêmio	2009	Série A	0	0	—		—		—		8 (Note: Appearance(s) in Copa FGF)	5	8	5
Oeste (loan)	2010	Série D	0	0	19	16	—		—		—		19	16
Atlético Mineiro	2010	Série A	17	2	—		—		5 (Note: Appearance(s) in Copa Sudamericana)	0	—		22	2
Atlético Mineiro	2011	Série A	0	0	7	3	3	1	—		—		10	4
Atlético Mineiro	Total		17	2	7	3	3	1	5	0	—		32	6
Palmeiras (loan)	2011	Série A	16	2	—		—		—		—		16	2
Palmeiras (loan)	2012	Série A	0	0	10	2	3	0	—		—		13	2
Palmeiras (loan)	Total		16	2	10	2	3	0	—		—		29	4
Atlético Goianiense	2012	Série A	15	2	—		—		3	0	—		18	2
FC Nordsjælland	2012–13	Danish Superliga	10	0	—		—		—		—		10	0
Figueirense	2013	Série B	12	9	—		1	1	—		—		13	10
Figueirense	2014	Série A	12	0	6	3	1	0	—		—		19	3
Figueirense	Total		24	9	6	3	2	1	—		—		32	13
Seongnam	2015	K League Classic	16	2	—		1	0	4 (Note: Appearance(s) in AFC Champions League)	1	—		21	5
Joinville	2015	Série A	5	1	—		—		1	0	—		6	1
Oeste	2016	Série B	15	4	9	4	—		—		—		24	8
São Bento	2017	Série C	0	0	11	5	—		—		—		11	5
Santa Cruz	2017	Série B	29	6	—		—		—		—		29	6
Red Bull Brasil	2018	Paulista	—		7	0	—		—		—		7	0
São Bento	2018	Série B	10	3	—		—		—		—		10	3
Ceará	2018	Série A	6	0	—		—		—		—		6	0
Ceará	2019	Série A	6	3	8	4	3	0	—		6 (Note: Appearance(s) in Copa do Nordeste)	3	23	10
Ceará	Total		12	3	8	4	3	0	—		6	3	29	10
CSA	2019	Série A	23	4	—		—		—		—		23	4
Buriram United	2020	Thai League 1	4	2	—		—		2	1	—		6	3
Operário Ferroviário	2020	Série B	18	9	—		—		—		—		18	9
Operário Ferroviário	2021	Série B	8	4	12	3	2	0	—		—		22	7
Operário Ferroviário	Total		26	13	12	3	2	0	—		—		40	16
Juventude	2021	Série A	16	6	—		—		—		—		16	6
Career total			238	59	96	45	14	2	15	2	14	8	377	118

== Honours ==
=== Club ===
Palmeiras

- Copa do Brasil: 2012

Figueirense

- Campeonato Catarinense: 2014

=== Individual ===
- Campeonato Paulista top scorer: 2010 (16 goals)
