= Andrew Ord =

English football manager (born 1979)

Personal information
- Date of birth: 30 June 1979 (age 47)
- Place of birth: Huddersfield, England
- Height: 1.87 m (6 ft 2 in)
- Position: Centre-back

Youth career
- 1995–1997: Harrogate Town

Senior career*
Years	Team	Apps	(Gls)
1996–1998	Harrogate Town		
1999–2000	Pickering Town		

Managerial career
- 2010–2012: BEC Tero Sasana
- 2012–2013: Muangthong United B team
- 2013–2017: Perth Glory (Assistant)
- 2017–2018: Bangladesh
- 2018: Air Force United
- 2018–2021: Buriram United (Head of Youth)
- 2021–2023: Perth RedStar (Technical Director)
- 2023–: Western Australia
- * Club domestic league appearances and goals

Andrew Ord (born 30 June 1979) is an English-Australian football coach who has held various roles in both International and club football throughout Asia. He is currently Head Coach of the Western Australia representative side.

== Career ==
=== Early years ===
Ord had a modest playing career as a central defender in Non-League football. He took up coaching at an early age when it became apparent that he would not be offered a full-time contract. After emigrating to Perth in 2006 he joined the WA NTC which has produced many players who have gone on to represent Australia. He also worked in Myanmar developing a full-time Academy for Yangon United before returning to Western Australia alongside Gareth Naven with Perth Glory in the National Youth League.

=== BEC Tero Sasana ===
In late 2010, Peter Butler brought him to inaugural AFC Champions League finalists BEC Tero Sasana where he was responsible for the under 21 team. He had an immediate impact winning the Thailand FA Youth Cup beating Buriram United 5–2 in the final. After Butler left for Kelantan FA the club finished the season in mid table so Ord was elevated to first team Head coach for the 2012 Thai Premier League season. He rebuilt the squad promoting many young players and on the opening day of season handed debuts to five teenagers, including Chanathip Songkrasin, Tanaboon Kesarat and Gilbert Koomson who then quickly established themselves as National Team players. Ord also recruited Cleiton Silva and he proved to be an inspired signing going on to win the Golden Boot with 24 goals. Ord led his young team to six victories in the opening eight fixtures earning him the Manager of the month awards for April and May 2012. With the club unexpectedly challenging for the title and into the quarter finals of both cup competitions expectations soared and in a major coup for the league he attracted ex-Real Betis captain Arzu. After a run of three games without a win, Ord was dismissed and Sven-Göran Eriksson replaced him in September 2012. Ord took some time off, spending two months in Spain to study the coaching of Diego Simeone at Atlético Madrid, the academy system of Villarreal CF and the recruitment and scouting policies of Sevilla FC.

=== Thailand ===
Ord returned as part of the coaching staff for the Thailand national team, with head coach Winfried Schäfer offering Ord a role for the 2012 AFF Suzuki Cup campaign, mainly as an analyst and opponent scout.

=== Muangthong United ===
During the tournament Ord was approached by reigning Thai Premier League champions Muangthong United to join their coaching staff for the 2013 season. Led by former Serbian international Slaviša Jokanović, the club had gone the previous season unbeaten and the club's youngsters were unable to make the breakthrough to the first team. Ord recommended they implement the European 'B' team model consisting of under-21 players competing against senior professionals in Thai League 2. Again he found success leading them to a runners-up finish missing out on the title by only one point.

=== Perth Glory ===
On 20 December 2013, Ord returned to Australia with Perth Glory as assistant coach to Kenny Lowe, after a player revolt had led to the sacking of Alistair Edwards. With the club in crisis it was reported that Ord had a heated dressing room exchange with temperamental Frenchman William Gallas but this proved to be a turning point with a late season surge seeing them climb off the bottom of the table. On 16 December 2014, they reached the final of the FFA Cup losing 1–0 to Adelaide United at Coopers Stadium. In August 2015, Ord was responsible for the capture of La Liga winger Diego Castro, from Getafe who helped them reach the 2015 FFA Cup final for a second year running. Castro went on to win the Johnny Warren Medal as the best player in the A League and is regarded as one of the finest players to ever play in Australia. On 17 May 2017, after four seasons, it was announced that Ord would leave his position with the club.

=== Bangladesh ===
On 18 May 2017, Ord reportedly signed a one-year contract to be the next head coach of the Bangladesh national team and was officially unveiled by SAFF president Kazi Salahuddin on 7 June 2017. He took over with Bangladeshi football in disarray having fired six coaches in just two years. Tasked with rebuilding the ageing squad he worked with Technical Director Paul Smalley to restructure the Men's National Team program, down to Under 15 level. They subsequently achieved several credible results at AFC level and found some success in SAFF youth competitions. Ord also assembled a quality backroom staff for the Senior team with Jason Brown joining him as goalkeeping coach. On 27 March 2018, they travelled to Laos where he again gave debuts to five teenagers on the way to a 2–2 draw, ending a run of away defeats that stretched back three years. Ord then declined an offer of an extended contract and resigned, returning to Thailand.

=== Air Force United ===
Ord took over from Sasom Pobprasert with the club well adrift at the bottom of the Thai League 1 table after taking just one point from the opening eight games. On 8 April 2018, he made a positive start to his new tenure with a 1–0 away victory at Nakhon Ratchasima. After only two months he departed by mutual consent to take up a new position with the current champions Buriram United.

=== Buriram United ===
Ord was hired by Thai League 1 club Buriram United to be their Head of Youth Development. but agreed to wait until 1 October 2018 before commencing. His responsibility was to lead a team of 19 staff and 120 players between the ages of 10 and 20 years old at the clubs full time residential facility. On 27 November 2021, head coach Alexandre Gama was sacked at the end of the first leg with the club top of the table and replaced with Masatada Ishii. In a major shake up Ord was one of seven support staff also dismissed as the club took on a new direction.

=== Perth RedStar ===
Newly formed out of a merger between ECU Joondalup and Northern Redbacks WSC, Ord was appointed as Technical Director. He oversaw success for both the Men's and Women's team as they became Champions of National Premier Leagues Western Australia for the 2022 season. Both teams were top of their respective league in 2023 when he resigned prior to the season's end, taking up a new role with governing body Football West.

== Honours ==
- 2011 FA Thailand Youth Cup Winner
- 2013 Thai League 2 Runner Up
- 2017 SAFF U-18 Championship Runner Up
- 2019 U-19 Thailand Championship Winner
