= Somjets Kesarat =

Thai footballer (born 1980)

Personal information
- Full name: Somjets Kesarat
- Date of birth: 20 August 1980 (age 46)
- Place of birth: Nonthaburi, Thailand
- Height: 1.73 m (5 ft 8 in)
- Positions: Midfielder; left back

Youth career
- Debsirin School

Senior career*
Years	Team	Apps	(Gls)
2005–2006	TOT		
2006–2007	Thailand Tobacco Monopoly		
2008	Krung Thai Bank		
2009–2010	Thai Port		
2010	PTT Rayong		
2010	TTM Phichit		
2011	Phitsanulok		
2012	Customs United		
2012	Trang		
2013	Krabi		
2013	Seeker		
2013–2014	Samut Prakan		
2015	Chiangrai City		
2016	Phayao		
- * Club domestic league appearances and goals as of 03:27, 30 October 2019 (UTC)

Somjets Kesarat (Thai: สมเจตน์ เกษารัตน์) is a retired professional footballer from Thailand. He played for Krung Thai Bank FC in the 2008 AFC Champions League group stages.

== Personal life ==
Somjets has a brother, Tanaboon Kesarat, who is also a footballer and plays for the Thailand national football team as a defensive midfielder.

== Honours ==
=== Club ===
Thai Port F.C.

- Thai FA Cup winner (1) : 2009

== Asian Champions League Appearances ==
#	Date	Venue	Opponent	Score	Result
1.	May 7, 2008	Kashima, Japan	Kashima Antlers	1-8	Lost
