= Chakkit Laptrakul =

Thai footballer

Personal information
- Full name: Chakkit Laptrakul
- Date of birth: 2 December 1994 (age 31)
- Place of birth: Fleury-Mérogis, France
- Height: 1.81 m (5 ft 11 in)
- Position: Winger

Team information
- Current team: Ayutthaya United
- Number: 17

Senior career*
Years	Team	Apps	(Gls)
2014	FC Fleury 91	10	(1)
2015–2017	Angthong	34	(9)
2018–2020	BG Pathum United	36	(2)
2019	→ Tokushima Vortis (loan)	0	(0)
2020	Samut Prakan City	8	(3)
2021–2024	Buriram United	19	(3)
2022–2024	→ PT Prachuap (loan)	43	(5)
2024–2025	Uthai Thani	26	(1)
2025–	Ayutthaya United	17	(0)

International career^{‡}
2023	Thailand	3	(0)
- * Club domestic league appearances and goals as of 30 January 2026 ‡ National team caps and goals as of 17 October 2023

Chakkit Laptrakul (Thai: จักรกฤษ ลาภตระกูล, born 2 December 1994) is a professional footballer who plays as a winger for Thai League 1 club Ayutthaya United. Born in France, he plays for the Thailand national team.

== Honours ==
=== Club ===
BG Pathum United

- Thai League 2: 2019

Buriram United

- Thai League 1: 2021–22
- Thai FA Cup: 2021–22
- Thai League Cup: 2021–22
