= Jung Jae-yong =

South Korean footballer (born 1990)

Jeong Jae-yong
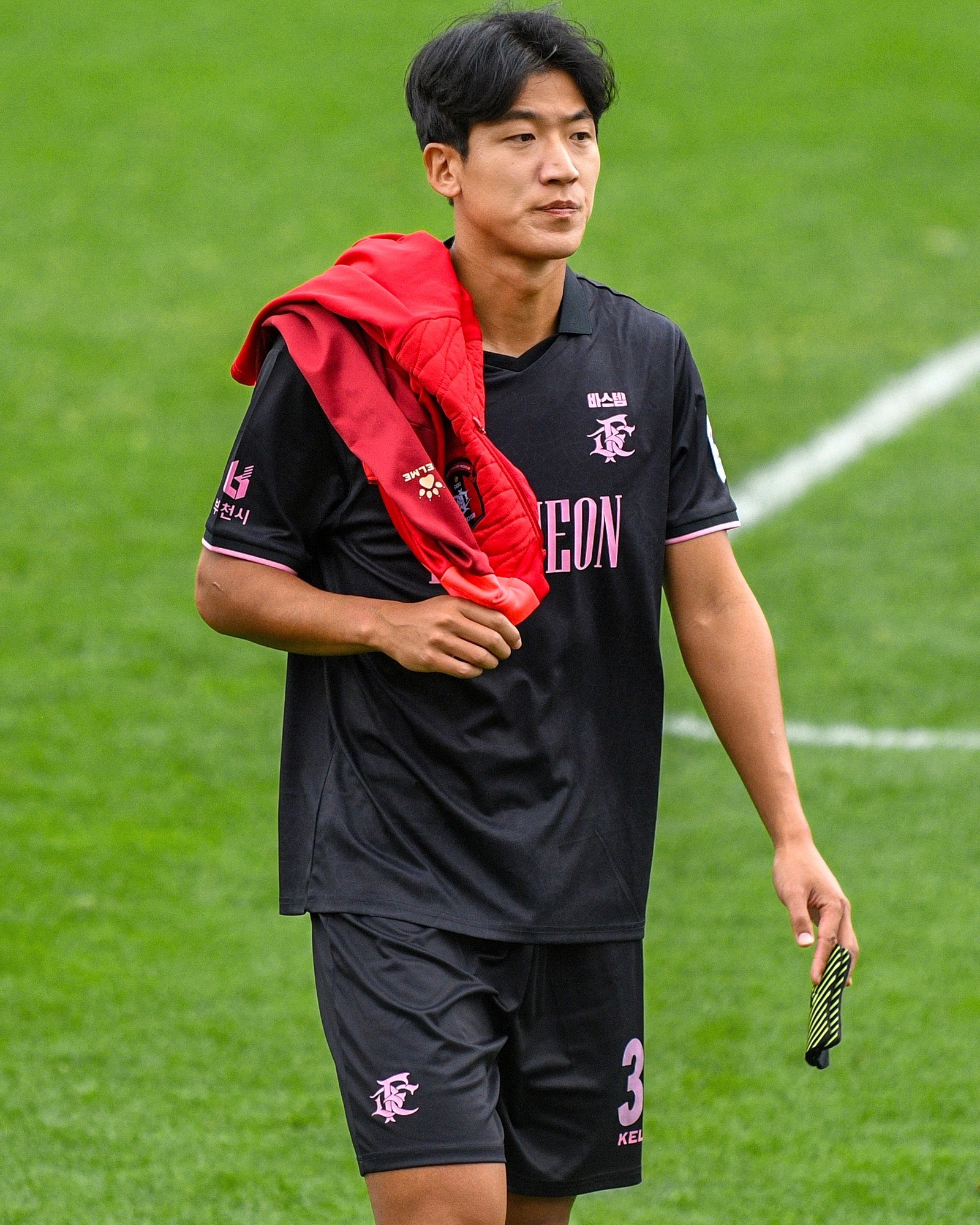
- Jeong in 2024

Personal information
- Date of birth: 14 September 1990 (age 36)
- Place of birth: South Korea
- Height: 1.88 m (6 ft 2 in)
- Position: Defensive midfielder

Team information
- Current team: Bucheon FC 1995
- Number: 32

Youth career
- 2009–2012: Korea University

Senior career*
Years	Team	Apps	(Gls)
2013–2016	FC Anyang	86	(15)
2016–2019	Ulsan Hyundai	45	(6)
2019	Pohang Steelers	32	(0)
2020	Buriram United	4	(0)
2020–2023	Suwon FC	78	(10)
2024	Seoul E-Land FC	10	(0)
2024–	Bucheon FC 1995	2	(0)
- * Club domestic league appearances and goals as of 28 June 2024

Jeong Jae-yong (Korean: 정재용; Hanja: 鄭宰溶; born 14 September 1990) is a South Korean footballer who plays as defensive midfielder for Bucheon FC 1995.

== Career ==
He was selected by FC Anyang in the 2013 K League draft. Jeong scored the best Korean goal of the season in FC Anyang. Jae-yong joined Ulsan Hyundai in summer 2016, and scored two goals in first match of 2017 K League Classic.

On 25 December 2019, it was confirmed that Jae-yong would join the Thai league club Buriram United for the 2020 season.

On 17 January 2024, Jae-yong joined Seoul E-Land FC of K League 2.

On 20 June 2024, he moved to Bucheon FC 1995.
