= Attaphon Kannoo =

Thai footballer (born 1991)

Personal information
- Full name: Attaphon Kannoo
- Date of birth: 25 August 1991 (age 35)
- Place of birth: Bangkok, Thailand
- Height: 1.75 m (5 ft 9 in)
- Position: Forward

Team information
- Current team: Chiangmai
- Number: 34

Youth career
- 2009–2010: Suankularb Wittayalai School

Senior career*
Years	Team	Apps	(Gls)
2010–2011	Buriram PEA		
2012–2014	Chamchuri United		
2015–2017	Suphanburi	1	(0)
2016	→ Army United (loan)	8	(1)
2017	Army United		
2018	Krabi		
2019	Army United		
2020	Samut Prakan City	0	(0)
2020–2023	Kasem Bundit University	45	(4)
2023–2025	Maejo United	35	(4)
2025–	Chiangmai	0	(0)

International career
2010	Thailand U19		
- * Club domestic league appearances and goals as of 7 April 2024

Attaphon Kannoo (Thai: อรรถพล กันหนู, born 25 August 1991) is a Thai professional footballer who plays as a forward.

== Personal life ==
Sittichok's younger brother Sittichok Kannoo is also a footballer.
