= U-19 Thailand Championship =

- Organiser(s): Sports Authority of Thailand; Football Association of Thailand; Coca-Cola
- Founded: 1979
- Region: Thailand
- Current champions: Assumption United
- Most championships: Buriram United (4 titles)
- Broadcaster: PPTV HD 36
- Website: http://www.cokecupthailand.com

U-19 Thailand Championship (Thai: ฟุตบอลเยาวชนอายุไม่เกิน 19 ปี ชิงแชมป์ประเทศไทย), commonly known as Coke Cup Thailand (Thai: โค้กคัพ) by title sponsor Coca-Cola, is an annual nationwide youth under-19 association football tournament. It is the largest scale youth amateur sport event in Thailand, even as soccer continues to gain more attention.

The tournament, organized by the Sports Authority of Thailand, Football Association of Thailand and Coca-Cola, first formed in 1979, before to the match it will be training instructors in the project; Coke go for goal for the trainer of the schools in Bangkok, Institute of Physical Education, and trainers across the country. In later years there has been a nationwide competition for the first time with joined of Thai League 1 club and changed the name of the competition to become more competitive as Coke Cup Thailand.

== Venues ==
=== Previous venues ===
- National Stadium
- SCG Stadium
- Thephasadin Stadium
- Thupatemi Stadium
- Boonyachinda Stadium

== Champions ==
| # | Year | Winners | Runners-up | MVP |
|---|---|---|---|---|
| 1 | 1982 | Khon Kaen | | Noppadol Vijannarong |
| 2 | 1983 | Sakon Nakhon | | Adul Malipan |
| 3 | 1985 | Phichit | | |
| 4 | 1986 | Surin | | |
| 5 | 1987 | Sakon Nakhon | | |
| 6 | 1988 | Chiang Rai | | |
| 7 | 1989 | Roi Et | | Prathan Boonson |
| 8 | 1991 | Nakhon Sawan | | Anurak Srikerd |
| 9 | 1996 | Chonburi | | Somkid Chuenta; Boonmee Thongtod; Taweesak Morasil; Nikorn Anuwan |
| 10 | 1999 | Bangkok Christian College | | Suriya Amatavet |
| 11 | 2000 | Bangkok Christian College | Nakhon Sawan | Weera Koedpudsa; Prakasit Sansook; Ittipol Poolsap; Chakrit Buathong |
| 12 | 2003 | Chonburi | | Kiatprawut Saiwaeo; Kraison Panjaroen; Warut Wongdee; Supawat Kongpracorn |
| 13 | 2005 | Assumption College Thonburi | | Teerasil Dangda |
| 14 | 2007 | Chonburi | | Seeket Madputeh |
| 15 | 2009 | Samut Prakan | | Sutee Chantorn |
| 16 | 2011 | Buriram United | Chonburi | Aekkaphop Saensra |
| 17 | 2013 | Buriram United | Suphanburi | Piyapong Homkhajohn |
| 18 | 2014 | Muangthong United | Buriram United | Picha Autra |
| 19 | 2015 | Muangthong United | Buriram United | Wongsakorn Chaikultewin |
| 20 | 2017 | Buriram United | Muangthong United | Supachok Sarachat |
| 21 | 2019 | Buriram United | Chonburi | Nopphon Lakhonphon |
| 22 | 2026 | Assumption United | Chonburi | Pitchaya Wuttichai |

== Awards ==
=== Prize money ===
- Champion: 1,000,000 Baht
- Runner-up: 500,000 Baht
