= Peemvit Thongnitiroj =

Thai footballer (born 1993)

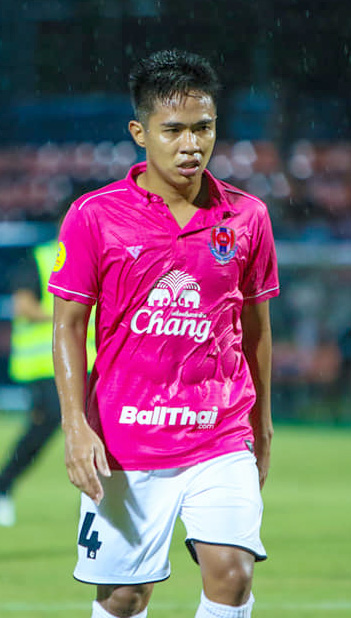
- with Navy FC, 2020

Personal information
- Full name: Peemvit Thongnitiroj
- Date of birth: 10 February 1993 (age 33)
- Place of birth: Suphanburi, Thailand
- Height: 1.61 m (5 ft 3 in)
- Position: Left midfielder

Senior career*
Years	Team	Apps	(Gls)
2014	Samutsongkhram	24	(2)
2015	Chainat	0	(0)
2016–2017	Thai Honda	10	(2)
2017	Pattaya United	1	(0)
2018	Sukhothai	11	(0)
2019	Sisaket	19	(1)
2020–2021	Navy	24	(7)
2021–2022	Uthai Thani	17	(3)
2022–2023	Mahasarakham	11	(1)
2023–2024	Pattaya United	20	(1)
- * Club domestic league appearances and goals as of 17 July 2024

Peemvit Thongnitiroj (Thai: ภีมวิชช์ ทองนิธิโรจน์) is a Thai professional footballer who is currently playing as a left midfielder.

== Honours ==
=== Club ===
Uthai Thani

- Thai League 3 (1): 2021–22
- Thai League 3 Northern Region (1): 2021–22
