= Apiwat Saisoi =

Thai footballer (born 1983)

Personal information
- Full name: Apiwat Saisoi
- Date of birth: September 15, 1983 (age 43)
- Place of birth: Buriram, Thailand
- Height: 1.72 m (5 ft 7 1/2 in)
- Position: Defender

Team information
- Current team: PTT FC
- Number: 12

Senior career*
Years	Team	Apps	(Gls)
2007–2008	Samut Songkhram	24	(0)
2009–present	PTT FC	13	(0)
- * Club domestic league appearances and goals as of 22 June 2008

Apiwat Saisoi (Thai อภิวัฒน์ สายสร้อย) is a Thai footballer. He currently plays for PTT FC in the Thai Division 1 League.
