= Tanaboon Kesarat =

Thai footballer

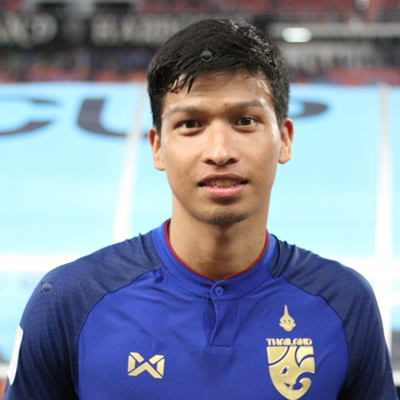
- Tanaboon in 2018

Personal information
- Full name: Tanaboon Kesarat
- Date of birth: 21 September 1993 (age 33)
- Place of birth: Samut Prakan, Thailand
- Height: 1.82 m (6 ft 0 in)
- Positions: Defensive midfielder; centre-back

Team information
- Current team: Port
- Number: 8

Youth career
- 2007–2010: Bangkok Sports School

Senior career*
Years	Team	Apps	(Gls)
2011	Bangkok	21	(0)
2012–2016	BEC Tero Sasana	90	(0)
2012	→ RBAC (loan)	19	(5)
2016	→ Muangthong United (loan)	18	(2)
2016	Muangthong United	11	(0)
2017–2018	Chiangrai United	22	(1)
2018–2019	BG Pathum United	22	(0)
2019–	Port	126	(3)

International career
2011–2012	Thailand U19	11	(2)
2013–2016	Thailand U23	21	(1)
2013–2024	Thailand	55	(1)
Medal record
Thailand under-23
Southeast Asian Games
Gold medal – first place	2013 Myanmar	Football
Gold medal – first place	2015 Singapore	Football
Thailand
ASEAN Football Championship
Winner	2014 AFF Suzuki Cup	2014
Winner	2016 AFF Suzuki Cup	2016
- * Club domestic league appearances and goals as of 04:04, 14 July 2025 (UTC)

Tanaboon Kesarat (Thai: ธนบูรณ์ เกษารัตน์, born 21 September 1993) is a Thai professional footballer who plays as a defensive midfielder or a centre-back where he captain the Thai League 1 club Port.

== International career ==
Tanaboon played for Thailand U19 in the 2012 AFC U-19 Championship qualification. His performances during the tournament caught the eyes of Andrew Ord, who was building an exciting side at BEC Tero Sasana with other youngsters like Chanathip Songkrasin, etc.

In 2013, he was selected for Thailand's first team squad and came in as a substitute in a 5-1 victory over China on 15 June.

He represented Thailand U23 in the 2013 Southeast Asian Games. He also represented Thailand U23 in the 2014 Asian Games.

Tanaboon was part of Thailand's winning squad in the 2014 AFF Suzuki Cup. During the last group stage game against Myanmar, Tanaboon scored the first goal of a 2-0 win with a stunning strike from outside the area. In 2015, he won the 2015 Southeast Asian Games with Thailand U23.

During the 2018 FIFA World Cup qualification, he has usually been in the starting lineup of Thailand.

== Statistics ==
=== International ===
As of 8 June 2022

National team	Year	Apps	Goals
Thailand	2013	1	0
Thailand	2014	9	1
Thailand	2015	3	0
Thailand	2016	15	0
Thailand	2017	5	0
Thailand	2018	7	0
Thailand	2019	11	0
Thailand	2022	3	0
Thailand	Total	54	1

=== International goals ===
No	Date	Venue	Opponent	Score	Result	Competition
1.	29 November 2014	Jalan Besar Stadium, Jalan Besar, Singapore	Myanmar	1–0	2–0	2014 AFF Championship

== Personal life ==
Tanaboon's brother, Somjets Kesarat, also plays football as a midfielder.

== Honours ==
=== Club ===
BEC Tero Sasana

- Thai League Cup: 2014

Muangthong United

- Thai League 1: 2016
- Thai League Cup: 2016

Chiangrai United

- Thai FA Cup: 2017

Port

- Thai FA Cup: 2019
- Thai League Cup: 2025–26
- Piala Presiden: 2025

=== International ===
Thailand U-23

- SEA Games Gold Medal: 2013, 2015

Thailand

- AFF Championship: 2014, 2016
- King's Cup: 2016, 2017

=== Individual ===
- AFF Championship Best XI: 2014
- Thai League 1 Player of the Month: May 2013, April 2016
