= Apiwat Pengprakon =

Thai footballer

Personal information
- Date of birth: 22 August 1988 (age 38)
- Place of birth: Buriram, Thailand
- Height: 1.81 m (5 ft 11 1/2 in)
- Position: Striker

Senior career*
Years	Team	Apps	(Gls)
2007–2013	North Bangkok University		
2013	→ Nakhon Ratchasima (loan)		
2013	→ Trat (loan)		
2014	Trat		
2015	Chiangmai		
2015	Khon Kaen United		
2015	Air Force Central		
2015–2016	Trat		
2017–2018	Bangkok Glass	5	(0)
2017	→ Chiangmai (loan)	25	(10)
2018	→ Ubon UMT United (loan)	15	(5)
2019	PTT Rayong	28	(7)
2020–2021	Ratchaburi Mitr Phol	20	(1)
2021–2022	Nongbua Pitchaya	9	(1)
2022–2023	Nakhon Si United	15	(1)
2023–2024	Rajpracha	3	(1)
- * Club domestic league appearances and goals as of 3 March 2024

Apiwat Pengprakon (Thai: อภิวัฒน์ เพ็งประโคน, born 22 August 1988) is a Thai professional footballer who plays as striker.
