= 2020–21 in Thai football =

Football in Thailand
- Season: 2020–21

Men's football
- Thai League 1: BG Pathum United
- Thai League 2: Nongbua Pitchaya
- Thai League 3: Lamphun Warrior
- Thai FA Cup: Chiangrai United
- Thailand Champions Cup: Chiangrai United

The 2020–21 season is the 105th season of competitive association football in Thailand.

== National teams ==
=== Thailand national football team ===
==== Results and fixtures ====
===== Friendlies =====
25 May 2021 Friendly	Thailand	0-1	Oman	Dubai, United Arab Emirates
19:00 UTC+4		Report	Al-Muqbali 43'	Stadium: The Sevens Stadium; Referee: Mohammed Abdulla Alali (United Arab Emirates)

29 May 2021 Friendly	Thailand	2-2	Tajikistan	Sharjah, United Arab Emirates
19:45 UTC+3	Mueanta 54', 60'	Report	Panjshanbe 63'; Zoirov 89'	Stadium: Khalid bin Mohammed Stadium

30 May 2021 Unofficial friendly	Thailand	1-4	Uzbekistan	Dubai, United Arab Emirates
19:00 UTC+4	Adisak 60'	Report	Husniddin Aliqulov 63'; Odil Ahmedov 70'; Temurkhuja Abdukholiqov 73' 90'	Stadium: The Sevens Stadium

== AFC competitions ==
=== AFC Champions League ===
==== Qualifying play-offs ====
21 January 2020 Preliminary round 2	Port (Thailand)	0–1	(Philippines) Ceres–Negros	Bangkok, Thailand
19:00 UTC+7		Live Report; Stats Report	Schröck 51'	Stadium: PAT Stadium; Attendance: 6,234; Referee: Yu Ming-hsun (Chinese Taipei)

21 January 2020 Preliminary round 2	Buriram United (Thailand)	2–1	(Vietnam) Hồ Chí Minh City	Buriram, Thailand
18:30 UTC+7	Cuesta 53'; Bueno 74'	Live Report; Stats Report	Diakité 77'	Stadium: Chang Arena; Attendance: 14,190; Referee: Nivon Robesh Gamini (Sri Lanka)

28 January 2020 Play-off round	Shanghai SIPG (China)	3–0	(Thailand) Buriram United	Shanghai, China
15:00 UTC+8	Li Shenglong 75'; Arnautović 90+2'; Hulk 90+5' (pen.)	Live Report; Stats Report		Stadium: Yuanshen Sports Centre Stadium; Attendance: 1 (Note: The match between Shanghai SIPG and Buriram United was played without spectators due to the COVID-19 pandemic in China.); Referee: Aziz Asimov (Uzbekistan)

==== Group stage ====
===== Group E =====
Pos	Team	Pld	W	D	L	GF	GA	GD	Pts	Qualification	BEI	MVC	SEO	CHI
1	(China) Beijing Guoan	6	5	1	0	12	4	+8	16	Advance to knockout stage	—	3–1	3–1	1–1
2	(Australia) Melbourne Victory	6	2	1	3	6	9	−3	7	Advance to knockout stage	0–2	—	2–1	1–0
3	(South Korea) FC Seoul	6	2	0	4	10	9	+1	6		1–2	1–0	—	5–0
4	(Thailand) Chiangrai United	6	1	2	3	5	11	−6	5		0–1	2–2	2–1	—

Source: AFC

== Thai competitions ==
League	Promoted to league	Relegated from league	Expelled or Dissolved	Re-elected
Thai League 1	BG Pathum United; Police Tero; Rayong	Chainat Hornbill; Chiangmai	PTT Rayong	None
Thai League 2	Khon Kaen United; Nakhon Pathom United; Phrae United; Ranong United	None	Thai Honda; Army United; Ubon United	None
Thai League 3	Wat Bot City; Muang Loei United; Pattani; Pathumthani University	Marines Eureka; Royal Thai Army; Surat Thani	Simork	None

=== Thai League 2 ===
Pos	Team	Pld	W	D	L	GF	GA	GD	Pts	Qualification
1	Nongbua Pitchaya (C, P)	34	21	12	1	63	16	+47	75	Promotion to Thai League 1
2	Chiangmai United (P)	34	20	9	5	64	28	+36	69	Promotion to Thai League 1
3	Nakhon Pathom United	34	17	10	7	66	36	+30	61	Play off to Thai League 1
4	Khonkaen United (O, P)	34	18	6	10	56	37	+19	60	Play off to Thai League 1
5	Phrae United	34	16	11	7	49	27	+22	59	Play off to Thai League 1
6	Chainat Hornbill	34	16	9	9	61	47	+14	57	Play off to Thai League 1
7	Chiangmai	34	16	8	10	56	45	+11	56	
8	Ranong United	34	16	5	13	45	41	+4	53	
9	Ayutthaya United	34	13	8	13	46	45	+1	47	
10	Khonkaen	34	11	8	15	34	38	−4	41	
11	Navy	34	11	7	16	47	53	−6	40 (Note: Navy finished ahead of Lampang on head-to-head points: Navy 1–0 Lampang, Lampang 1–2 Navy.)	
12	Lampang	34	11	7	16	39	46	−7	40	
13	Customs United	34	11	6	17	37	62	−25	39	
14	Kasetsart	34	11	5	18	36	53	−17	38 (Note: Kasetsart finished ahead of Udon Thani on head-to-head points: Kasetsart 2–1 Udon Thani, Udon Thani 0–0 Kasetsart.)	
15	Udon Thani	34	9	11	14	44	46	−2	38	
16	Sisaket (R)	34	9	9	16	34	44	−10	36	Relegation to Thai League 3
17	Uthai Thani (R)	34	5	10	19	34	53	−19	25	Relegation to Thai League 3
18	Samut Sakhon (R)	34	2	5	27	25	119	−94	11	Relegation to Thai League 3

Updated to match(es) played on 31 March 2021. Source: Thai League
Rules for classification: 1) Points; 2) Head-to-head points; 3) Head-to-head goals difference; 4) Head-to-head goals scored; 5) Overall goals difference; 6) Overall goals scored; 7) Fair play points; 8) Play-off without extra time;).
(C) Champions; (O) Play-off winners; (P) Promoted; (R) Relegated

=== Cup competitions ===
==== Thai FA Cup ====
===== Final =====
11 April 2021	Chiangrai United (T1)	1–1 (a.e.t.) (4–3 p)	Chonburi (T1)	Khlong Luang, Pathum Thani
18:00 (UTC+7)	Sivakorn Tiatrakul 40'	Report	Chatmongkol Rueangthanarot 30'	Stadium: Thammasat Stadium; Attendance: 0 Referee: Chaireag Ngam-som; Assistant referees: Pattarapong Kijsathit, Komsan Kampan; Fourth official: Songkran Bunmeekiart
	Penalties
	Akarawin Sawasdee (penalty scored); Phitiwat Sukjitthammakul (penalty scored); Wasan Homsan (penalty scored); Shinnaphat Leeaoh (penalty missed); Chotipat Poomkaew (penalty scored)		(penalty scored) Kritsada Kaman; (penalty missed) Eliandro; (penalty scored) Worachit Kanitsribampen; (penalty scored) Phanuphong Phonsa; (penalty missed) Kroekrit Thaweekarn

==== Thailand Champions Cup ====
2 February 2020	Chiangrai United	2–0	Port	Nonthaburi
19:00 (UTC+7)	Lee Yong-rae 51'; Chaiyawat 55'	Report		Stadium: SCG Stadium; Attendance: 6,044; Referee: Torpong Somsing (Thailand); Assistant referees: Pattarapong Kidsatid, Thanat Chucheun; Fourth official: Wiwat Jampa-on

== Managerial changes ==
This is a list of changes of managers within Thai league football:

Team	Outgoing manager	Manner of departure	Date of departure	Position in table	Incoming manager	Date of appointment
Sukhothai	(Thailand) Pairoj Borwonwatanadilok	End of contract	27 October 2019	Pre-season	(Thailand) Surapong Kongthep	27 October 2019
Nakhon Ratchasima	(Thailand) Chalermwoot Sa-ngapol	End of contract	27 October 2019	Pre-season	(Thailand) Teerasak Po-on	27 October 2019
Ratchaburi Mitr Phol	(Thailand) Nuengrutai Srathongvian	End of contract	10 November 2019	Pre-season	(Thailand) Chaitud Uamtham	10 November 2019
Chiangrai United	(Brazil) Ailton dos Santos Silva	End of contract	12 November 2019	Pre-season	(Japan) Masami Taki	12 November 2019
Navy	(South Korea) Lim Jong-heon	End of contract	30 November 2019	Pre-season	(Thailand) Chalermwoot Sa-ngapol	17 December 2019
Samut Prakan City	(Japan) Tetsuya Murayama	End of contract	23 December 2019	Pre-season	(Japan) Masatada Ishii	23 December 2019
Rayong	(Thailand) Chusak Sriphum	Resigned	28 February 2020	15th	(Brazil) Arthur Bernardes	28 February 2020
Lampang	(Thailand) Punnakan Chiratkankun	Sacked	6 March 2020	13th	(Thailand) Prasert Changmoon	6 March 2020
Port	(Thailand) Choketawee Promrut	Mutual consent	28 March 2020	3rd	(Thailand) Jadet Meelarp	28 March 2020
Khonkaen	(Thailand) Sirisak Yodyardthai	Signed by BG Pathum United Academy	23 May 2020	16th	(Thailand) Jakkrit Bunkham	23 May 2020
Kasetsart	(Thailand) Somdet Hitates	Resigned	10 July 2020	12th	(Thailand) Warit Boonsripitayanon	10 July 2020
Sisaket	(Thailand) Worachai Surinsirirat	Mutual consent	5 August 2020	8th	(Thailand) Chusak Sriphum	5 August 2020
Udon Thani	(Thailand) Jakarat Tonhongsa	Signed by Muangthong United Academy	25 August 2020	14th	(Thailand) Jetsada Jitsawad	25 August 2020
Port	(Thailand) Jadet Meelarp	Promoted to Technical director	21 September 2020	3rd	(Thailand) Sarawut Treephan	21 September 2020
Uthai Thani	(Thailand) Thanaset Amornsinkittichote	Resigned	27 September 2020	18th	(Thailand) Therdsak Chaiman	27 September 2020
Sisaket	(Thailand) Chusak Sriphum	Resigned	29 September 2020	5th	(Thailand) Preeda Chankra	29 September 2020
Muangthong United	(Brazil) Alexandre Gama	Resigned	17 October 2020	11th	(North Macedonia) Mario Gjurovski	19 October 2020
Bangkok United	(Brazil) Alexandré Pölking	Resigned	18 October 2020	7th	(Australia) Danny Invincibile (caretaker)	20 October 2020
Buriram United	(Montenegro) Božidar Bandović	Resigned	19 October 2020	10th	(Brazil) Alexandre Gama	23 October 2020
Chiangmai United	(Brazil) Carlos Eduardo Parreira	Resigned	30 October 2020	2nd	(Germany) Dennis Amato	30 October 2020
Chiangrai United	(Japan) Masami Taki	Resigned	3 November 2020	2nd	(Thailand) Alongkorn Thongaum (caretaker)	4 November 2020
Bangkok United	(Australia) Danny Invincibile	End of caretaker spell	4 November 2020	9th	(Thailand) Totchtawan Sripan	5 November 2020
Rayong	(Brazil) Arthur Bernardes	End of contract	11 November 2020	16th	(Japan) Masami Taki	12 November 2020
Customs United	(Thailand) Worrawoot Srimaka	Resigned	14 November 2020	14th	(Thailand) Santi Songte	14 November 2020
Rajpracha	(Thailand) Pattanapong Sripramote	Resigned	25 November 2020	3rd	(Thailand) Jakkrit Bunkham	25 November 2020
Khon Kaen	(Thailand) Jakkrit Bunkham	Signed by Rajpracha	25 November 2020	15th	(Thailand) Pichet Suphomuang	28 November 2020
Chiangrai United	(Thailand) Alongkorn Thongaum	End of caretaker spell	30 November 2020	4th	(Brazil) Emerson Pereira (caretaker)	1 December 2020
Udon Thani	(Thailand) Jetsada Jitsawad	Resigned	24 December 2020	14th	(Thailand) Paniphon Kerdyam	24 December 2020
Ratchaburi Mitr Phol	(Thailand) Chaitud Uamtham	Released by club	31 December 2020	3rd	(Thailand) Somchai Maiwilai (caretaker)	1 January 2021
Udon Thani	(Thailand) Paniphon Kerdyam	Resigned	4 January 2021	14th	(Germany) Jörg Steinebrunner	5 January 2021
Muangkan United	(Thailand) Krit Singpreecha	Sacked	24 January 2021	1st	(Thailand) Jadet Meelarp	25 January 2021
Udon Thani	(Germany) Jörg Steinebrunner	Redesignated	11 February 2021	14th	(Thailand) Sirisak Yodyardthai	12 February 2021
Khon Kaen	(Thailand) Pichet Suphomuang	Redesignated	16 February 2021	15th	(Thailand) Somchai Makmool	16 February 2021
Kasetsart	(Thailand) Warit Boonsripitayanon	Resigned	28 February 2021	11th	(Thailand) Paniphon Kerdyam	1 March 2021
Khon Kaen United	(Japan) Sugao Kambe	Mutual consent	8 March 2021	3rd	(Thailand) Patipat Robroo	8 March 2021
