= 2020–21 Thai League 1 =

Thai League 1
- Season: 2020–21
- Dates: 14 February 2020 – 28 March 2021
- Champions: BG Pathum United
- Relegated: Rayong; Sukhothai; Trat
- 2021 AFC Champions League: BG Pathum United; Port; Chiangrai United; Ratchaburi Mitr Phol
- 2022 AFC Champions League: BG Pathum United; Buriram United; Chiangrai United; Port
- Matches: 240
- Goals: 703 (2.93 per match)
- Top goalscorer: Barros Tardeli (25 goals)
- Biggest home win: 5 goals difference Suphanburi 5–0 Police Tero (30 October 2020); Bangkok United 5–0 Trat (10 March 2021)
- Biggest away win: 6 goals difference Samut Prakan City 0–6 BG Pathum United (28 February 2021)
- Highest scoring: 9 goals Bangkok United 4–5 Sukhothai (18 October 2020); Rayong 2–7 Port (18 October 2020); Samut Prakan City 6–3 Port (27 December 2020)
- Longest winning run: 11 matches BG Pathum United
- Longest unbeaten run: 29 matches BG Pathum United
- Longest winless run: 12 matches Rayong
- Longest losing run: 9 matches Rayong
- Highest attendance: 15,590; Buriram United 4–0 Chonburi (22 February 2020)
- Lowest attendance: 0
- Total attendance: 582,639
- Average attendance: 3,310
- All statistics correct as of 28 March 2021.

The 2020–21 Thai League 1 is the 24th season of the Thai League 1, the top Thai professional league for association football clubs, since its establishment in 1996, also known as Toyota Thai League due to the sponsorship deal with Toyota Motor Thailand. A total of 16 teams will compete in the league. The season began on 14 February 2020 and is scheduled to conclude in October 2020.

The 1st transfer window is from 11 November 2019 to 3 February 2020 while the 2nd transfer window is from 15 June 2020 to 12 July 2020.

Chiangrai United are the defending champions, while BG Pathum United, Police Tero and Rayong have entered as the promoted teams from the 2019 Thai League 2.

On March 1, all of Thai League 1 matches between 7 and 31 March will be played behind closed doors as broadcast only events. However, on March 4, the decision changed to postpone all of matches prior to 18 April due to the COVID-19 pandemic in Thailand.

In April 2020, the Football Association of Thailand announced that the season would restart in September 2020 and end in May 2021, with the top four teams after the first half of the season qualifying for the 2021 AFC Champions League. For the 2022 AFC Champions League, the same criteria as applied in previous years will be followed, with the league and Thai FA Cup winners qualifying for the group stage, and the league runners-up and 3rd place qualifying for the play-offs.

== Teams ==
There are 16 clubs in the league, with three promoted teams from Thai League 2 replacing the two teams that were relegated from the 2019 season along with PTT Rayong who folded at the end of the campaign. All clubs that secured Thai League status for the season were subject to approval by the AFC Club Licensing before becoming eligible to participate.

Chainat Hornbill and Chiangmai were relegated at the end of the 2019 season after finishing in the bottom two places of the table. PTT Rayong withdrew from the league after the season, sparing Suphanburi from relegation. They were replaced by 2019 Thai League 2 champions BG Pathum United, whom played under the name Bangkok Glass in the 2018 Thai League 1 campaign. They were joined by runners up Police Tero, who also got promoted at the first time of asking and 3rd place Rayong. Rayong was founded in 2009 and earned promotion to the Thai League 1 for the first time in their history.

Locations of the 2020 Thai League teams
Football clubs in the Bangkok Metropolitan Region

=== Stadium and locations ===
Note: Table lists in alphabetical order.

Team	Province	Stadium	Capacity
Bangkok United	Pathum Thani	Thammasat Stadium	19,375
BG Pathum United	Pathum Thani	Leo Stadium	10,114
Buriram United	Buriram	Chang Arena	32,600
Chiangrai United	Chiangrai	Singha Stadium	13,000
Chonburi	Chonburi	Chonburi Stadium	8,680
Muangthong United	Nonthaburi	SCG Stadium	12,505
Nakhon Ratchasima	Nakhon Ratchasima	80th Birthday Stadium	24,641
Police Tero	Bangkok	Boonyachinda Stadium	3,550
Port	Bangkok	PAT Stadium	6,000
PT Prachuap	Prachuap Khiri Khan	Sam Ao Stadium	5,000
Ratchaburi Mitr Phol	Ratchaburi	Mitr Phol Stadium	10,000
Rayong	Rayong	Rayong Provincial Stadium	7,500
Samut Prakan City	Samut Prakan	Samut Prakarn SAT Stadium	5,130
Sukhothai	Sukhothai	Thung Thalay Luang Stadium	8,000
Suphanburi	Suphanburi	Suphan Buri Provincial Stadium	15,279
Trat	Trat	Trat Provincial Stadium	5,000

=== Personnel and sponsoring ===
Note: Flags indicate national team as has been defined under FIFA eligibility rules. Players may hold more than one non-FIFA nationality.

Team	Head coach	Captain	Kit manufacturer	Shirt sponsors
Bangkok United	(Thailand) Totchtawan Sripan	(Thailand) Anthony Ampaipitakwong	Ari	True; Huawei; Daikin; CP; Smart Heart; Toyota; Ziebart; Euro Cake
BG Pathum United	(Thailand) Dusit Chalermsan	(Thailand) Surachat Sareepim	Nike	Leo; Umay+ Euro Cake; Mitsubishi Electric; Vichaiyut Hospital; Thai-Denmark; Cartoon Club
Buriram United	(Brazil) Alexandre Gama	(Thailand) Siwarak Tedsungnoen	Made by club (Domestic); Ari (Asia)	Chang; Grab; Rabbit; Coca-Cola; Muang Thai Insurance; King Power; Yamaha; Thai AirAsia; I-Mobile; TrueVisions; CP; Amari Hotel; Jele
Chiangrai United	(Brazil) Emerson Pereira (caretaker)	(Thailand) Phitiwat Sukjitthammakul	Made by club (Domestic); Grand Sport (Asia)	Leo; Bangkok Airways; TOA
Chonburi	(Thailand) Sasom Pobprasert	(Thailand) Kroekrit Thaweekarn	Nike	Chang; Euro Cake
Muangthong United	(North Macedonia) Mario Gjurovski	(Thailand) Wattana Playnum	Shoot (Made By Club)	SCG; Yamaha; Coca-Cola; AIA; Herbalife Nutrition; I-Mobile; Gulf; Sharp Corporation
Nakhon Ratchasima	(Thailand) Teerasak Po-on	(Thailand) Chalermpong Kerdkaew	Grand Sport	Mazda; Leo; CP; Central Plaza; Gulf
Police Tero	(Thailand) Rangsan Viwatchaichok	(Thailand) Adisak Srikampang	FBT	Chang; CP; Channel 3
Port	(Thailand) Sarawut Treephan	(Spain) David Rochela	Grand Sport	Muang Thai Insurance; AirAsia; CP; Thai AirAsia; Thai Union
PT Prachuap	(Thailand) Thawatchai Damrong-Ongtrakul	(Thailand) Adul Muensamaan	Warrix	PTG Energy; Euro Cake; 2Gear
Ratchaburi Mitr Phol	(Thailand) Somchai Maiwilai (caretaker)	(Thailand) Philip Roller	Made by club	Mitr Phol; Kubota; Chang; Euro Cake
Rayong	(Japan) Masami Taki	(Thailand) Anuchit Ngrnbukkol	Volt	Gulf
Samut Prakan City	(Japan) Masatada Ishii	(Thailand) Peeradon Chamratsamee	Ari	Sanwa; AirAsia
Sukhothai	(Thailand) Surapong Kongthep	(Madagascar) John Baggio	Mawin	Chang; Carabao; CP
Suphanburi	(Nigeria) Adebayo Gbadebo	(Thailand) Suphan Thongsong	Warrix	Chang; True
Trat	(Thailand) Phayong Khunnaen	(Thailand) Pornpreecha Jarunai	Grand Sport	CP; Chang

=== Managerial changes ===
Team	Outgoing manager	Manner of departure	Date of vacancy	Week	Table	Incoming manager
Ratchaburi Mitr Phol	(Thailand) Somchai Maiwilai	End of caretaker role	20 October 2019	Pre-season		(Thailand) Nuengrutai Srathongvian
Sukhothai	(Thailand) Pairoj Borwonwatanadilok	End of contract	27 October 2019	Pre-season		(Thailand) Surapong Kongthep
Nakhon Ratchasima	(Thailand) Chalermwoot Sa-ngapol	End of contract	27 October 2019	Pre-season		(Thailand) Teerasak Po-on
Chiangrai United	(Brazil) Ailton Silva	End of contract	12 November 2019	Pre-season		(Japan) Masami Taki
Samut Prakan City	(Japan) Tetsuya Murayama	End of contract	23 December 2019	Pre-season		(Japan) Masatada Ishii
Ratchaburi Mitr Phol	(Thailand) Nuengrutai Srathongvian	End of contract	10 November 2019	End of season		(Thailand) Chaitud Uamtham
Rayong	(Thailand) Chusak Sriphum	Resigned	28 February 2020	3	15	(Brazil) Arthur Bernardes
Ratchaburi Mitr Phol	(Thailand) Chaitud Uamtham	Released by club	2 March 2020	4	2	(Thailand) Somchai Maiwilai (caretaker)
Port	(Thailand) Choketawee Promrut	Mutual consent	28 March 2020	4	3	(Thailand) Jadet Meelarp
Port	(Thailand) Jadet Meelarp	Promoted to Technical director	21 September 2020	6	4	(Thailand) Sarawut Treephan
Muangthong United	(Brazil) Alexandre Gama	Resigned	17 October 2020	9	10	(North Macedonia) Mario Gjurovski

== Foreign players ==
The FIFA Transfer Window Period for Thailand was 19 November 2019 to 10 February 2020, and 15 June to 12 July 2020.

Club	Player 1	Player 2	Player 3	Asian Player	ASEAN 1	ASEAN 2	ASEAN 3	Former
Bangkok United	(Brazil) Heberty	(Brazil) Everton	(Brazil) Vander	(Japan) Hajime Hosogai	(Philippines) Michael Falkesgaard			(El Salvador) Nelson Bonilla (Brazil) Brenner Marlos
Buriram United	(Brazil) Digão	(Brazil) Maicon	(Brazil) Samuel Rosa	(Australia) Brandon O'Neill	(Philippines) Kevin Ingreso	(Myanmar) Aung Thu		(South Korea) Jung Jae-yong (Venezuela) Andrés Túñez (Brazil) Ricardo Bueno (Argentina) Bernardo Cuesta (Uzbekistan) Akbar Ismatullaev (Serbia) Marko Šćepović (Israel) Gidi Kanyuk (Croatia) Renato Kelić
BG Pathum United	(Brazil) Victor Cardozo	(Brazil) Diogo	(Venezuela) Andrés Túñez	(Japan) Mitsuru Maruoka	(Philippines) Álvaro Silva	(Singapore) Irfan Fandi		(Brazil) Barros Tardeli (Japan) Yuki Bamba (Malaysia) Norshahrul Idlan Talaha (Spain) Toti
Chiangrai United	(Brazil) Bill	(Brazil) Brinner	(Brazil) Felipe Amorim	(South Korea) Cho Ji-hun				(Brazil) Mailson (South Korea) Lee Yong-rae (Brazil) Jajá
Chonburi	(Brazil) Eliandro	(Nigeria) Adefolarin Durosinmi	(Croatia) Renato Kelić	(Bahrain) Jaycee John	(Malaysia) Junior Eldstål			(Philippines) Carli de Murga (Japan) Kazuto Kushida (Montenegro) Dragan Bošković (Brazil) Caion (Brazil) Júnior Lopes
Muangthong United	(Brazil) Derley	(Brazil) Lucas Rocha	(Brazil) Willian Popp	(Uzbekistan) Sardor Mirzaev	(Philippines) Daisuke Sato			(Vietnam) Đặng Văn Lâm
Nakhon Ratchasima	(Brazil) Dennis Murillo	(Israel) Gidi Kanyuk	(Ivory Coast) Amadou Ouattara	(Australia) Jesse Curran	(Philippines) Dennis Villanueva			(Brazil) Leandro Assumpção
Port	(Ivory Coast) Yannick Boli	(El Salvador) Nelson Bonilla	(Spain) Sergio Suárez	(South Korea) Go Seul-ki	(Philippines) Martin Steuble			(Spain) David Rochela (Brazil) Heberty
PT Prachuap	(Brazil) William Henrique	(Brazil) Willen Mota	(Montenegro) Adnan Orahovac	(Uzbekistan) Artyom Filiposyan	(Philippines) Iain Ramsay	(Indonesia) Yanto Basna		(Singapore) Baihakki Khaizan (Brazil) Bruno Mezenga (Nigeria) Adefolarin Durosinmi (Laos) Soukaphone Vongchiengkham (South Korea) Yoo Jun-soo
Police Tero	(Brazil) Tiago Chulapa	(Ghana) Isaac Honny	(Montenegro) Dragan Bošković	(South Korea) Kwon Dae-hee	(Malaysia) Dominic Tan			(Brazil) Matheus Alves (Ivory Coast) Marc Landry Babo (Malaysia) Mohamadou Sumareh (France) Greg Houla
Ratchaburi	(France) Lossémy Karaboué	(France) Simon Dia	(Martinique) Steeven Langil	(South Korea) Lee Jae-sung	(Philippines) Luke Woodland	(Philippines) Javier Patiño	(Philippines) OJ Porteria	(Philippines) Justin Baas (Philippines) Curt Dizon (Ivory Coast) Yannick Boli (South Korea) Yeo Sung-hae
Rayong	(Brazil) Adalgisio Pitbull	(Brazil) Bruno Paulo	(England) Adam Mitter	(Japan) Goshi Okubo				(Brazil) Tiago Chulapa (Ivory Coast) Bireme Diouf (Netherlands) Leandro Resida (Brazil) Tiago Luís (Brazil) Birungueta (South Korea) Park Tae-hyeong (Brazil) Danilo (Laos) Outthilath Nammakhoth (South Korea) Han Chang-woo
Samut Prakan City	(Brazil) Barros Tardeli	(Spain) Toti	(Slovenia) Aris Zarifović	(Japan) Yuto Ono	(Singapore) Zulfahmi Arifin	(Singapore) Izwan Mahbud		(Brazil) Pedro Júnior (Japan) Tatsuya Sakai
Sukhothai	(Brazil) Ibson Melo	(Madagascar) John Baggio	(South Korea) Yeo Sung-hae	(South Korea) Jung Myung-oh	(Myanmar) Zaw Min Tun	(Myanmar) Hlaing Bo Bo	(Philippines) Joshua Grommen	(Myanmar) Kyaw Ko Ko (Brazil) Evandro Paulista
Suphanburi	(Brazil) Alef	(Brazil) Caion	(Brazil) Leandro Assumpção	(South Korea) Bae Shin-young	(Philippines) Patrick Deyto	(Philippines) Patrick Reichelt		(Japan) Ryutaro Karube (Brazil) Felipe Amorim (Brazil) Eliandro (Singapore) Zulfahmi Arifin
Trat	(Brazil) Ricardo Santos	(Brazil) Júnior Lopes	(Brazil) Jonatan Reis	(Afghanistan) Mustafa Azadzoy	(Philippines) Amani Aguinaldo	(Myanmar) Suan Lam Mang		(Singapore) Afiq Yunos (Singapore) Izwan Mahbud (Nigeria) Adefolarin Durosinmi (South Korea) Kang Soo-il (Myanmar) Aung Kaung Mann

== League table ==
The top three teams at the end of the season qualify for the 2022 AFC Champions League.

Pos	Team	Pld	W	D	L	GF	GA	GD	Pts	Qualification
1	BG Pathum United (C)	30	24	5	1	54	13	+41	77	Qualification for 2022 AFC Champions League group stage
2	Buriram United	30	20	3	7	63	26	+37	63	Qualification for 2022 AFC Champions League qualifying play-offs
3	Port	30	17	5	8	58	36	+22	56	Qualification for 2022 AFC Champions League qualifying play-offs
4	Chiangrai United (Note: Chiangrai United qualified for the AFC Champions League group stage as 2020–21 Thai FA Cup winners.)	30	16	6	8	48	32	+16	54	Qualification for 2022 AFC Champions League group stage
5	Bangkok United	30	15	6	9	57	39	+18	51	
6	Samut Prakan City	30	14	5	11	58	51	+7	47 (Note: Samut Prakan City finished ahead of Muangthong United on head-to-head points: Muangthong United 0–0 Samut Prakan City, Samut Prakan City 4–2 Muangthong United.)	
7	Muangthong United	30	14	5	11	52	43	+9	47	
8	Ratchaburi Mitr Phol	30	13	7	10	48	41	+7	46	
9	Nakhon Ratchasima	30	11	9	10	40	41	−1	42	
10	PT Prachuap	30	10	7	13	35	47	−12	37	
11	Police Tero	30	10	6	14	32	50	−18	36	
12	Chonburi	30	9	5	16	30	47	−17	32	
13	Suphanburi	30	9	3	18	33	47	−14	30	
14	Sukhothai (R)	30	8	4	18	40	57	−17	28	Relegation to Thai League 2
15	Trat (R)	30	4	5	21	31	64	−33	17	Relegation to Thai League 2
16	Rayong (R)	30	4	3	23	24	69	−45	15	Relegation to Thai League 2

Source: Thai League
Rules for classification: 1) Points; 2) Head-to-head points; 3) Head-to-head goals difference; 4) Head-to-head goals scored; 5) Overall goals difference; 6) Overall goals scored; 7) Fair play points; 8) Play-off without extra time;).
(C) Champions; (R) Relegated

=== Positions by round ===
The table lists the positions of teams after each week of matches. In order to preserve chronological evolvements, any postponed matches are not included in the round at which they were originally scheduled, but added to the full round they were played immediately afterwards. For example, if a match is scheduled for matchday 13, but then postponed and played between days 16 and 17, it will be added to the standings for day 16.

Team ╲ Round	1	2	3	4	5	6	7	8	9	10	11	12	13	14	15	16	17	18	19	20	21	22	23	24	25	26	27	28	29	30
BG Pathum United	5	5	4	4	5	2	1	1	1	1	1	1	1	1	1	1	1	1	1	1	1	1	1	1	1	1	1	1	1	1
Buriram United	11	6	9	11	11	12	12	10	10	11	11	8	8	5	5	4	3	3	3	3	3	2	2	2	2	2	2	2	2	2
Port	1	1	1	3	4	7	4	8	5	4	3	3	2	2	2	2	2	2	2	2	2	3	3	3	3	3	3	3	3	3
Chiangrai United	9	10	7	10	9	6	3	5	2	2	2	2	4	3	3	5	4	4	5	6	6	7	6	6	7	5	5	4	4	4
Bangkok United	2	2	3	1	1	1	2	3	7	6	9	6	5	6	9	9	8	8	8	8	7	6	5	5	6	4	4	5	5	5
Samut Prakan City	8	13	14	14	12	11	11	12	12	12	12	12	11	8	6	6	6	7	7	7	4	5	7	7	5	8	8	7	6	6
Muangthong United	10	14	10	7	10	10	9	9	11	10	8	9	9	11	8	7	7	6	4	5	5	4	4	4	4	6	7	8	8	7
Ratchaburi Mitr Phol	4	4	2	2	2	3	5	2	3	3	4	4	3	4	4	3	5	5	6	4	8	8	8	8	8	7	6	6	7	8
Nakhon Ratchasima	16	8	12	12	13	14	14	14	13	13	14	14	14	14	13	11	9	9	9	9	9	9	9	9	10	9	9	9	9	9
PT Prachuap	13	12	13	13	14	13	13	13	14	15	13	13	13	13	14	14	14	14	14	11	13	12	12	12	12	11	11	10	10	10
Police Tero	6	3	6	5	3	4	6	7	8	8	10	11	12	9	11	12	12	11	10	10	11	10	10	10	9	10	10	11	11	11
Chonburi	3	9	5	9	8	9	8	4	6	7	6	7	7	10	7	8	10	12	12	13	10	11	11	11	11	12	12	12	12	12
Suphanburi	12	11	8	6	6	8	10	11	9	9	7	10	10	12	12	13	13	13	13	14	14	14	14	14	14	14	14	14	14	13
Sukhothai	7	7	11	8	7	5	7	6	4	5	5	5	6	7	10	10	11	10	11	12	12	13	13	13	13	13	13	13	13	14
Trat	15	16	16	16	16	16	16	15	15	14	15	15	15	15	16	15	15	15	15	15	15	15	15	15	15	15	15	15	15	15
Rayong	14	15	15	15	15	15	15	16	16	16	16	16	16	16	15	16	16	16	16	16	16	16	16	16	16	16	16	16	16	16

Leader and qualification to the 2022 AFC Champions League group stage
Qualification to the 2022 AFC Champions League qualifying play-offs
Relegation to the 2021–22 Thai League 2

Updated to match(es) played on 28 March 2021. Source: Thai League

=== Qualification for 2021 AFC Champions League ===
The top four teams after the first half of the season (Round 15) qualify for the 2021 AFC Champions League. The Round 15 match between Chiangrai United and Port, originally scheduled to be played on 5 January 2021, was postponed along with all matches in January 2021 due to the COVID-19 pandemic in Thailand, and could not be played before the 2021 AFC Champions League group stage draw on 27 January 2021, and thus this match would not be taken into account when ranking the third-placed and fourth-placed teams between Chiangrai United and Ratchaburi Mitr Phol.

Pos	Team	Pld	W	D	L	GF	GA	GD	Pts	Qualification
1	BG Pathum United	15	13	2	0	30	8	+22	41	Qualification for 2021 AFC Champions League group stage
2	Port	14	11	1	2	35	13	+22	34	Qualification for 2021 AFC Champions League group stage
3	Chiangrai United	14	8	2	4	22	13	+9	26	Qualification for 2021 AFC Champions League group stage
4	Ratchaburi Mitr Phol	15	8	2	5	28	24	+4	26	Qualification for 2021 AFC Champions League group stage
5	Buriram United	15	7	2	6	27	19	+8	23	
6	Samut Prakan City	15	6	4	5	27	21	+6	22	
7	Chonburi	15	7	1	7	18	24	−6	22	
8	Muangthong United	15	6	3	6	22	19	+3	21	
9	Bangkok United	15	6	2	7	23	22	+1	20	
10	Sukhothai	15	6	2	7	25	27	−2	20	
11	Police Tero	15	5	4	6	15	24	−9	19	
12	Suphanburi	15	5	2	8	17	22	−5	17	
13	Nakhon Ratchasima	15	4	4	7	22	30	−8	16	
14	PT Prachuap	15	3	5	7	18	24	−6	14	
15	Rayong	15	3	1	11	11	32	−21	10	
16	Trat	15	2	1	12	18	36	−18	7	

Source: Thai League
Rules for classification: 1) Points; 2) Overall goals difference; 3) Overall goals scored; 4) Fair play points; 5) Play-off without extra time.

=== Positions by round - first half of season ===
The top four teams after the first half of the season (Round 15) qualified for the 2021 AFC Champions League.

Team ╲ Round	1	2	3	4	5	6	7	8	9	10	11	12	13	14	15
BG Pathum United	5	5	4	4	5	2	1	1	1	1	1	1	1	1	1
Port	1	1	1	3	4	7	4	8	5	4	3	3	2	2	2
Chiangrai United	9	10	7	10	9	6	3	5	2	2	2	2	4	3	3
Ratchaburi Mitr Phol	4	4	2	2	2	3	5	2	3	3	4	4	3	4	4
Buriram United	11	6	9	11	11	12	12	10	10	11	11	8	8	5	5
Samut Prakan City	8	13	14	14	12	11	11	12	12	12	12	12	11	8	6
Chonburi	3	9	5	9	8	9	8	4	6	7	6	7	7	10	7
Muangthong United	10	14	10	7	10	10	9	9	11	10	8	9	9	11	8
Bangkok United	2	2	3	1	1	1	2	3	7	6	9	6	5	6	9
Sukhothai	7	7	11	8	7	5	7	6	4	5	5	5	6	7	10
Police Tero	6	3	6	5	3	4	6	7	8	8	10	11	12	9	11
Suphanburi	12	11	8	6	6	8	10	11	9	9	7	10	10	12	12
Nakhon Ratchasima	16	8	12	12	13	14	14	14	13	13	14	14	14	14	13
PT Prachuap	13	12	13	13	14	13	13	13	14	15	13	13	13	13	14
Rayong	14	15	15	15	15	15	15	16	16	16	16	16	16	16	15
Trat	15	16	16	16	16	16	16	15	15	14	15	15	15	15	16

Qualification to the 2021 AFC Champions League group stage
Qualification to the 2021 AFC Champions League qualifying play-offs

Source: Thai League

=== Results by match played ===
Team ╲ Round	1	2	3	4	5	6	7	8	9	10	11	12	13	14	15	16	17	18	19	20	21	22	23	24	25	26	27	28	29	30
BG Pathum United	W	D	W	W	W	W	W	W	D	W	W	W	W	W	W	W	W	W	W	W	D	W	W	W	D	W	W	D	W	L
Buriram United	L	W	L	D	W	W	L	L	D	L	W	W	L	W	W	W	W	W	L	W	W	W	W	W	D	W	W	W	W	W
Port	W	W	W	D	L	L	W	W	W	W	W	W	W	W	L	W	W	L	L	L	D	L	W	W	D	W	W	D	L	D
Chiangrai United	D	D	W	L	W	W	W	L	W	W	L	W	L	W	L	W	D	L	D	W	L	D	W	D	W	W	W	W	L	W
Bangkok United	W	W	W	W	W	L	L	L	L	D	L	W	D	L	L	D	W	D	W	W	D	W	W	L	D	W	W	L	W	W
Samut Prakan City	D	L	L	L	W	D	W	D	D	L	W	L	W	W	W	W	L	L	W	W	W	D	L	W	W	L	L	W	W	L
Muangthong United	L	L	W	W	L	D	W	L	W	W	L	D	L	D	W	D	W	W	W	L	W	W	W	L	D	L	L	L	W	W
Ratchaburi Mitr Phol	W	W	W	W	D	L	D	W	L	W	L	W	W	L	L	W	L	L	L	W	L	D	D	W	D	W	W	D	L	D
Nakhon Ratchasima	L	W	L	L	L	L	D	D	W	D	L	D	L	W	W	W	W	W	W	D	D	D	L	W	L	W	L	W	D	D
PT Prachuap	L	D	L	L	L	W	L	D	D	L	W	D	W	D	L	L	W	L	W	W	L	D	D	L	W	W	W	W	L	L
Police Tero	W	W	L	W	W	D	L	D	D	L	L	L	D	W	L	L	L	W	W	L	L	W	D	W	W	L	L	L	D	L
Chonburi	W	L	W	L	W	L	W	W	D	L	W	L	L	L	W	L	L	L	D	L	W	L	W	L	D	L	L	L	D	D
Suphanburi	L	D	W	W	W	L	L	L	D	W	W	L	L	L	L	L	W	L	L	L	W	L	L	L	L	L	D	L	W	W
Sukhothai	W	L	L	W	W	W	D	D	W	L	L	W	L	L	L	L	L	W	L	L	D	L	L	L	L	L	W	L	D	L
Trat	L	L	L	L	L	L	L	W	W	D	L	L	L	L	L	W	L	L	D	W	D	L	L	L	D	L	L	L	L	D
Rayong	L	L	L	L	L	L	L	L	L	W	L	D	W	L	W	L	L	L	L	L	L	L	L	L	D	L	L	W	L	D

Updated to match(es) played on 28 March 2021. Source: Thai League
W = Win; D = Draw; L = Lose

== Results ==
Home \ Away	BKU	BGP	BRU	CRU	CBR	MTU	NRM	PTR	POR	PTP	RBM	RAY	SPC	SUK	SPB	TRA
Bangkok United	—	0–2	1–2	4–1	5–1	2–2	2–3	1–1	0–1	2–0	2–1	4–1	3–0	4–5	2–1	5–0
BG Pathum United	1–1	—	1–0	0–0	2–1	2–1	1–0	3–0	2–1	2–0	2–0	2–1	2–2	2–0	4–0	2–1
Buriram United	2–0	0–1	—	1–0	4–0	2–3	1–2	2–0	1–1	4–0	3–0	5–1	1–3	3–0	1–0	2–0
Chiangrai United	1–1	0–1	0–1	—	4–3	2–1	1–1	2–0	1–2	1–0	2–1	3–2	2–1	3–1	2–2	3–0
Chonburi	1–0	0–1	0–2	0–3	—	1–2	3–1	1–0	0–2	0–1	3–2	2–0	0–2	0–0	4–1	3–2
Muangthong United	1–2	1–0	2–2	2–3	1–0	—	1–1	1–2	2–1	3–3	2–1	4–0	0–0	3–0	3–1	0–1
Nakhon Ratchasima	1–1	0–2	0–3	0–4	2–0	4–1	—	4–0	2–2	1–2	1–0	2–0	0–0	3–3	1–0	2–0
Police Tero	1–2	0–2	1–0	0–1	1–2	1–3	0–0	—	2–0	1–1	1–1	1–0	1–0	2–0	3–1	0–1
Port	2–2	0–1	1–2	0–1	2–1	2–0	4–1	0–2 (Note: Football Association of Thailand awarded Police Tero a 2–0 win as a result of Port's stadium have a power outage lasts more than one hour.)	—	2–1	3–1	3–1	4–1	1–0	4–0	0–0
PT Prachuap	0–1	0–0	0–1	1–0	1–0	1–0	1–0	2–2	1–3	—	1–1	1–1	0–3	2–3	2–1	4–2
Ratchaburi Mitr Phol	2–1	1–4	4–3	1–1	0–0	1–3	1–0	4–0	0–0	2–2	—	3–0	3–1	3–1	1–0	2–0
Rayong	1–0	0–1	0–5	0–2	1–1	0–3	1–2	6–1	2–7	1–3	0–3	—	0–1	2–1	0–1	2–1
Samut Prakan City	1–2	0–6	1–2	1–1	4–1	4–2	2–2	3–5	6–3	4–0	1–3	1–0	—	3–2	1–2	3–1
Sukhothai	0–1	2–3	0–3	2–0	1–2	1–0	0–0	1–1	1–2	4–3	1–2	5–1	2–3	—	1–0	2–4
Suphanburi	2–3	1–1	2–3	2–1	0–0	1–2	2–0	5–0	0–2	1–0	1–2	1–0	1–2	1–0	—	1–2
Trat	2–3	0–1	2–2	1–3	0–0	2–3	3–4	1–3	2–3	1–2	2–2	0–0	0–4	0–1	0–2	—

Updated to match(es) played on 28 March 2021. Source: Thai League
Legend: Blue = home team win; Yellow = draw; Red = away team win.

== Season statistics ==
=== Top scorers ===
As of 28 March 2021.

Rank	Player	Club	Goals
1	(Brazil) Barros Tardeli	Samut Prakan City	25
2	(Brazil) Dennis Murillo	Nakhon Ratchasima	21
3	(Brazil) Bill	Chiangrai United	18
4	(Brazil) Heberty	Port (7 Goals); Bangkok United (9 Goals)	16
4	(Brazil) Willen Mota	PT Prachuap	16
4	(Madagascar) John Baggio	Sukhothai	16
7	(Brazil) Victor Cardozo	BG Pathum United	15
8	(Spain) Sergio Suárez	Port	14
8	(Thailand) Philip Roller	Ratchaburi Mitr Phol	14
10	(Uzbekistan) Sardor Mirzaev	Muangthong United	13
10	(Brazil) Caion	Chonburi (6 Goals); Suphanburi (7 Goals)	13

=== Top assists ===
As of 28 March 2021.

Rank	Player	Club	Assists
1	(Thailand) Jaroensak Wonggorn	Samut Prakan City	14
2	(Brazil) Vander Luiz	Bangkok United	13
3	(Martinique) Steeven Langil	Ratchaburi Mitr Phol	11
4	(Thailand) Jakkaphan Kaewprom	Buriram United	10
5	(Thailand) Ratthanakorn Maikami	Buriram United	8
6	(Brazil) Ibson Melo	Sukhothai	7
6	(Madagascar) John Baggio	Sukhothai	7
8	(Thailand) Tristan Do	Bangkok United	6
8	(Thailand) Sumanya Purisai	BG Pathum United	6
8	(Thailand) Wattanakorn Sawatlakhorn	Muangthong United	6
8	(Uzbekistan) Sardor Mirzaev	Muangthong United	6
8	(Brazil) Willen Mota	PT Prachuap	6
8	(Thailand) Theppitak Poonjuang	Rayong	6
8	(Brazil) Leandro Assumpção	Suphanburi	6
8	(Brazil) Ricardo Santos	Trat	6

=== Hat-tricks ===
Player	For	Against	Result	Date
(Brazil) Bill	Chiangrai United	Nakhon Ratchasima	4–0 (A)	20 September 2020
(Brazil) Barros Tardeli	Samut Prakan City	Chonburi	4–1 (H)	12 December 2020
(Brazil) Dennis Murillo	Nakhon Ratchasima	Trat	4–3 (A)	13 December 2020
(Brazil) Dennis Murillo	Nakhon Ratchasima	Police Tero	4–0 (H)	19 December 2020
(Madagascar) John Baggio^{4}	Sukhothai	PT Prachuap	4–3 (H)	11 February 2021
(Brazil) Barros Tardeli	Samut Prakan City	Muangthong United	4–2 (H)	17 February 2021
(Thailand) Sansern Limwattana	Trat	Sukhothai	4–2 (A)	17 February 2021
(Uzbekistan) Sardor Mirzaev	Muangthong United	Ratchaburi Mitr Phol	3–1 (A)	20 February 2021
(Thailand) Supachok Sarachat	Buriram United	Suphanburi	3–2 (A)	20 February 2021
(Brazil) Barros Tardeli	Samut Prakan City	PT Prachuap	4–0 (H)	21 February 2021
(Brazil) Diogo	BG Pathum United	Samut Prakan City	6–0 (A)	28 February 2021
(Brazil) Dennis Murillo^{4}	Nakhon Ratchasima	Muangthong United	4–1 (H)	9 March 2021
(Brazil) Willen Mota	PT Prachuap	Rayong	3–1 (A)	9 March 2021

=== Clean sheets ===
As of 28 March 2021.

Rank	Player	Club	Clean sheets
1	(Thailand) Chatchai Budprom	BG Pathum United	19
2	(Thailand) Siwarak Tedsungnoen	Buriram United	15
3	(Thailand) Tanachai Noorach	Nakhon Ratchasima	8
3	(Thailand) Patiwat Khammai	Samut Prakan City	8
5	(Thailand) Saranon Anuin	Chiangrai United	7
5	(Thailand) Worawut Srisupha	Port	7
7	(Thailand) Sinthaweechai Hathairattanakool	Chonburi	6
7	(Thailand) Kampol Pathom-attakul	Rayong (1), Ratchaburi Mitr Phol (5)	6
9	(Philippines) Michael Falkesgaard	Bangkok United	5
9	(Thailand) Prasit Padungchok	Police Tero	5
9	(Thailand) Somporn Yos	SCG Muangthong United	5
9	(Thailand) Peerapong Ruennin	Sukhothai	5
9	(Philippines) Patrick Deyto	Suphanburi	5

== Awards ==
=== Monthly awards ===
Month	Coach of the Month		Player of the Month		Goal of the Month		Reference
Month	Coach	Club	Player	Club	Player	Club	Reference
February	(Thailand) Chaitud Uamtham	Ratchaburi Mitr Phol	(Japan) Hajime Hosogai	Bangkok United	(Brazil) Dennis Murillo	Nakhon Ratchasima	
September	(Thailand) Dusit Chalermsan	BG Pathum United	(Thailand) Chatchai Budprom	BG Pathum United	(Brazil) Ibson Melo	Sukhothai	
October	(Thailand) Sarawut Treephan	Port	(Venezuela) Andrés Túñez	BG Pathum United	(Brazil) Willian Popp	Muangthong United	
November	(Thailand) Dusit Chalermsan	BG Pathum United	(Spain) Sergio Suárez	Port	(Thailand) Sittichok Paso	Trat	
December	(Japan) Masatada Ishii	Samut Prakan City	(Thailand) Jaroensak Wonggorn	Samut Prakan City	(Brazil) Derley	Muangthong United	
March	(Brazil) Alexandre Gama	Buriram United	(Thailand) Philip Roller	Ratchaburi Mitr Phol	(Ivory Coast) Yannick Boli	Port	

=== Season awards ===
2020–21 Thai League Best XI

Award	Winner	Club
Thai League Manager of the Year	(Thailand) Surachai Jaturapattarapong	BG Pathum United
Thai League Most Valuable Player	(Thailand) Sumanya Purisai	BG Pathum United
Thai League Rookie of the Year	(Thailand) Jaroensak Wonggorn	Samut Prakan City

Thai League Best XI
Attack	(Brazil) Dennis Murillo (Nakhon Ratchasima)			(Brazil) Barros Tardeli (Samut Prakan City)	
Midfield	(Thailand) Jaroensak Wonggorn (Samut Prakan City)	(Thailand) Jakkaphan Kaewprom (Buriram United)	(Spain) Sergio Suárez (Port)	(Thailand) Sumanya Purisai (BG Pathum United)	(Thailand) Philip Roller (Ratchaburi Mitr Phol)
Defence	(Venezuela) Andrés Túñez (BG Pathum United)		(Brazil) Victor Cardozo (BG Pathum United)	(Thailand) Chalermpong Kerdkaew (Nakhon Ratchasima)	
Goalkeeper	(Thailand) Chatchai Budprom (BG Pathum United)				

== Attendances ==
=== Overall statistical table ===
Pos	Team	Total	High	Low	Average	Change
1	Buriram United	108,346	15,590	0	9,029	−33.4%
2	Muangthong United	55,642	9,214	0	4,637	−49.0%
3	Nakhon Ratchasima	41,348	12,296	0	4,594	−62.9%
4	BG Pathum United	45,705	9,828	0	4,155	−4.7%^{†}
5	Suphanburi	47,027	7,500	0	3,934	−39.8%
6	Ratchaburi Mitr Phol	39,843	8,583	0	3,622	−25.7%
7	Chonburi	31,121	5,245	0	3,112	−34.6%
8	Port	32,813	6,940	0	2,983	−41.4%
9	Chiangrai United	32,301	5,470	0	2,936	−41.9%
10	Sukhothai	28,989	4,398	0	2,635	−30.0%
11	Bangkok United	26,585	4,323	0	2,417	−44.8%
12	Rayong	21,827	4,560	0	1,819	−6.6%^{†}
13	PT Prachuap	21,052	3,654	0	1,754	−51.0%
14	Trat	17,798	3,005	0	1,618	−58.9%
15	Samut Prakan City	16,086	3,958	0	1,609	−43.8%
16	Police Tero	13,828	3,379	0	1,598	+36.1%^{†}
	League total	582,639	15,590	0	3,310	−41.9%

Updated to games played on 28 March 2021
Source: Thai League
Notes:
^{†} Teams played previous season in Thai League 2

=== Attendances by home match played ===
Team \ Match played	1	2	3	4	5	6	7	8	9	10	11	12	13	14	15	Total
Bangkok United	2,977	3,780	2,032	3,850	1,587	2,568	2,181	4,323	0	0	0	0	1,071	1,009	1,207	26,585
BG Pathum United	9,828	7,345	1,940	2,414	2,489	4,962	4,593	0	0	0	0	1,814	1,898	3,940	4,482	45,705
Buriram United	15,590	15,252	4,000	4,000	15,306	7,768	9,510	0	0	0	5,510	6,465	8,028	7,188	9,729	108,346
Chiangrai United	2,896	2,517	3,062	3,062	2,538	5,470	4,299	0	0	0	0	1,676	1,512	1,736	3,533	32,301
Chonburi	5,245	4,216	2,147	2,147	2,147	3,247	4,295	0	0	0	0	0	2,150	2,619	2,908	31,121
Muangthong United	9,214	7,642	2,956	2,942	2,738	4,732	5,342	2,948	0	0	0	1,945	3,250	2,952	5,695	55,642
Nakhon Ratchasima	3,033	2,940	3,873	3,724	4,281	3,277	0	0	0	0	0	0	3,979	3,945	12,296	41,348
Police Tero	3,379	1,378	1,064	1,214	1,250	1,875	1,248	0	0	0	0	0	1,178	1,242	2,148	15,976
Port	6,940	5,465	1,386	1,357	1,548	2,970	3,050	3,000	0	0	0	0	1,353	2,876	2,868	32,813
PT Prachuap	3,654	3,195	1,275	1,275	1,275	1,250	1,100	2,350	0	0	0	1,025	786	1,783	2,084	21,052
Ratchaburi Mitr Phol	4,274	8,583	3,794	2,425	2,458	2,341	3,225	4,373	0	0	0	0	2,479	2,323	3,568	39,843
Rayong	3,600	4,560	2,580	1,834	1,950	1,386	1,868	1,650	0	0	0	313	480	819	787	21,827
Samut Prakan City	3,958	2,259	751	1,115	1,012	1,244	1,345	0	0	0	0	0	689	2,182	1,531	16,086
Sukhothai	4,398	3,931	4,108	2,005	1,995	2,005	2,002	4,005	1,983	0	0	0	0	1,147	1,410	28,989
Suphanburi	4,150	3,659	3,676	3,563	4,106	6,451	0	0	0	1,373	2,953	3,345	3,519	4,285	7,500	47,027
Trat	3,005	2,555	1,190	1,249	1,250	2,555	1,699	1,202	0	0	0	0	1,055	923	1,115	17,798

Source: Thai League

== See also ==
- 2020–21 Thai League 2
- 2020–21 Thai League 3
- 2020–21 Thailand Amateur League
- 2020–21 Thai FA Cup
- 2020 Thailand Champions Cup
