= 2020–21 Thai League 2 =

Thai League 2
- Season: 2020–21
- Dates: 14 February 2020 — 31 March 2021(excluding play-off)
- Champions: Nongbua Pitchaya
- Promoted: Nongbua Pitchaya; Chiangmai United; Khonkaen United
- Relegated: Samut Sakhon; Sisaket; Uthai Thani
- Matches: 306
- Goals: 840 (2.75 per match)
- Top goalscorer: Paulo Conrado (25 goals)
- Biggest home win: 7 goals difference Udon Thani 7–0 Samut Sakhon (10 March 2021)
- Biggest away win: 6 goals difference Samut Sakhon 0–6 Ranong United (10 February 2021); Samut Sakhon 1–7 Lampang (20 March 2021)
- Highest scoring: 7 goals difference Ayutthaya United 3–4 Navy (16 February 2020); Nakhon Pathom United 4–3 Udon Thani (29 November 2020); Lampang 4–3 Sisaket (19 December 2020); Udon Thani 7–0 Samut Sakhon (10 March 2021)
- Longest winning run: 7 matches Nongbua Pitchaya
- Longest unbeaten run: 32 matches Nongbua Pitchaya
- Longest winless run: 15 matches Uthai Thani
- Longest losing run: 12 matches Samut Sakhon
- Highest attendance: 5,218; Khonkaen United 2–1 Lampang (16 February 2020)
- Lowest attendance: 0
- Total attendance: 249,625
- Average attendance: 1,071
- All statistics correct as of 31 March 2021.

The 2020–21 Thai League 2 is the 23nd season of the Thai League 2, the second-tier professional league for Thailand's association football clubs, since its establishment in 1997, also known as M-150 Championship due to the sponsorship deal with M-150. A total of 18 teams will compete in the league. The season began on 14 February 2020 and is scheduled to conclude on 31 March 2021.

For this season two teams in the final table (champion and runner up) directly promoted to Thai League 1 next season while teams ranked 3rd - 6th qualified in play off for last spot in top tier next season.

The 1st transfer window is from 19 November 2019 to 10 February 2020 while the 2nd transfer window is from 15 June 2020 to 12 July 2020.

== Team changes ==
The following teams have changed division since the 2019 season.

=== To Thai League 2 ===
Promoted from Thai League 3

- Khon Kaen United
- Nakhon Pathom United
- Phrae United
- Ranong United

Relegated from Thai League 1

- Chainat Hornbill
- Chiangmai

=== From Thai League 2 ===
Promoted to Thai League 1

- BG Pathum United
- Police Tero
- Rayong

Relegated to Thai League 4

- Ubon United

Withdrew

- Thai Honda
- Army United

=== Renamed Clubs ===
- Air Force United was renamed and moved to Uthai Thani
- JL Chiangmai United renamed Chiangmai United

== Teams ==
Locations of the 2020 Thai League 2 teams
Football clubs in Bangkok Metropolitan Region

=== Stadium and locations ===
Team	Location	Stadium	Capacity
Ayutthaya United	Ayutthaya	Ayutthaya Provincial Stadium	6,000
Chainat Hornbill	Chainat	Khao Plong Stadium	8,625
Chiangmai	Chiang Mai	Chiangmai Municipality Stadium	5,000
Chiangmai United	Chiang Mai	Rajamangala University of technology lanna Stadium (DoiSaket)	2,500
Customs United	Samut Prakan	Customs Department Stadium, Ladkrabang 54	2,000
Kasetsart	Bangkok	TOT Stadium Chaeng Watthana	5,000
Khonkaen	Khon Kaen	Khonkaen PAO. Stadium	7,000
Khonkaen United	Khon Kaen	Khonkaen PAO. Stadium	7,000
Lampang	Lampang	Lampang Provincial Stadium	5,500
Nakhon Pathom United	Nakhon Pathom	Nakhon Pathom Municipality Sport School Stadium	6,000
Navy	Chonburi	Sattahip Navy Stadium	6,000
Nongbua Pitchaya	Nongbua Lamphu	Pitchaya Stadium	6,000
Phrae United	Phrae	Huai Ma Stadium	2,500
Ranong United	Ranong	Ranong Provincial Stadium	7,000
Samut Sakhon	Samut Sakhon	Samut Sakhon Provincial Stadium	3,500
Sisaket	Sisaket	Sri Nakhon Lamduan Stadium	10,000
Udon Thani	Udon Thani	IPE Udonthani Stadium	4,000
Uthai Thani	Uthai Thani	Uthai Thani Province Stadium	4,477

=== Personnel ===
Note: Flags indicate national team as has been defined under FIFA eligibility rules. Players may hold more than one non-FIFA nationality; Club dissolved during season would shown by grey background.

Team	Head coach	Captain	Kit	Sponsor
Ayutthaya United	(Thailand) Santi Chaiyaphuak	(Thailand) Datsakorn Thonglao	Pegansport	Gulf, Chang
Chainat Hornbill	(Germany) Ronald Boretti	(Thailand) Parinya Utapao	Warrix	Wangkanai; AirAsia; Kubota
Chiangmai	(Thailand) Tanongsak Prajakkata	(Thailand) Eakkalak Lungnam	Made by club	Leo; Bangkok Airways
Chiangmai United	(Germany) Dennis Amato	(Thailand) Natthapong Samana	Volt	Moose; Jele
Customs United	(Thailand) Santi Songte	(Thailand) Adisak Ganu	Maximum	Nexx Point; Krungthai; GSB; Thai lottery Customs Department
Kasetsart	(Thailand) Paniphon Kerdyam	(Thailand) Sompong Soleb	Versus	Tanowsri Traditional Chicken; Atlantic
Khonkaen	(Thailand) Pichet Suphomuang	(Thailand) Sarawut Koedsri	Made by club	Leo; Muang Thai Insurance
Khonkaen United	(Thailand) Patipat Robroo	(Brazil) Douglas Cobo	OCEL	Leo; Krungthai-AXA
Lampang	(Thailand) Weerayut Binebdullohman	(Thailand) Slanyu Buanaem	Made by club	Bangkok Airways
Nakhon Pathom United	(Thailand) Thongchai Sukkoki	(Thailand) Chokchai Chuchai	Made by club	Deedo; Chang
Navy	(Thailand) Chalermwoot Sa-ngapol	(Thailand) Chusana Numkanitsorn	Versus	Chang
Nongbua Pitchaya	(Thailand) Somchai Chuayboonchum	(Thailand) Kittikun Jamsuwan	Warrix	Pitchaya
Phrae United	(Thailand) Arnon Bandasak	(Thailand) Pichitphong Choeichiu	Grand Sport	Phrae Sila; SAMART
Ranong United	(Switzerland) Damian Bellón	(Thailand) Witchaya Kaenthong	Eureka	Grand Andaman; PTG; Leo; Air Asia
Samut Sakhon	(Serbia) Dragan Djurdjevic	(Thailand) Theerawat Pinpradub	Okane Sport	Thai Union Group; Leo
Sisaket	(Thailand) Worrawoot Srimaka	(Japan) Hiromichi Katano	Warrix	Muang Thai Insurance; Betagro
Udon Thani	(Thailand) Sirisak Yodyardthai	(Thailand) Prakit Deeprom	Versus	Leo; AirAsia; Fitness First
Uthai Thani	(Thailand) Worachai Surinsirirat	(Thailand) Suchon Sa-nguandee	Orca Sport	Panngarm Thaised

=== Managerial changes ===
Team	Outgoing manager	Manner of departure	Date of vacancy	Week	Table	Incoming manager
Lampang	(Thailand) Punnakan Chiratkankun	Sacked	6 March 2020	4	13	(Thailand) Prasert Changmoon
Khonkaen	(Thailand) Sirisak Yodyardthai	Signed by BG Pathum United Academy	23 May 2020	4	16	(Thailand) Jakkrit Bunkham
Kasetsart	(Thailand) Somdet Hitates	Resigned	10 July 2020	4	12	(Thailand) Warit Boonsripitayanon
Sisaket	(Thailand) Worachai Surinsirirat	Mutual consent	5 August 2020	4	8	(Thailand) Chusak Sriphum
Udon Thani	(Thailand) Jakarat Tonhongsa	Signed by Muangthong United Academy	25 August 2020	4	14	(Thailand) Jetsada Jitsawad
Uthai Thani	(Thailand) Thanaset Amornsinkittichote	Resigned	27 September 2020	8	18	(Thailand) Therdsak Chaiman
Sisaket	(Thailand) Chusak Sriphum	Resigned	29 September 2020	8	15	(Thailand) Preeda Chankra
Chiangmai United	(Brazil) Carlos Eduardo Parreira	Resigned	30 October 2020	11	2	(Germany) Dennis Amato
Customs United	(Thailand) Worrawoot Srimaka	Resigned	14 November 2020	13	14	(Thailand) Santi Songte
Khon Kaen United	(Japan) Sugao Kambe	Sacked	8 March 2021	27	3	(Thailand) Patipat Robroo

=== Foreign Players ===
Players name in bold indicates the player was registered during the mid-season transfer window.

Club	Player 1	Player 2	Player 3	Asian Player	ASEAN Player 1	ASEAN Player 2	Former
Ayutthaya United	(Serbia) **Milan Bubalo**	(Serbia) **Veljko Filipović**		(South Korea) **Yoo Byung-soo**			(Spain) Dennis Nieblas (Brazil) Andrey Coutinho (Japan) Renshi Yamaguchi (Ivory Coast) Marc Landry Babo (South Korea) **Lee Ho**
Chainat Hornbill	(Brazil) **Erivelto**	(Brazil) **Wellington Priori**	(Spain) **Dennis Nieblas**	(Japan) Kazuki Murakami			(Brazil) André Luís (Myanmar) Myat Kaung Khant (Brazil) Harrison (Brazil) Rafael Coelho (France) **Simon Dia**
Chiangmai	(Brazil) **Jhonatan Bernardo**	(Namibia) Sadney Urikhob	(Japan) Ryo Matsumura	(Japan) **Yuki Bamba**			(Brazil) Luis Verdini (Brazil) Alex Rafael (Spain) **Dennis Nieblas**
Chiangmai United	(Brazil) **Evandro Paulista**	(Brazil) Evson	(Netherlands) Melvin de Leeuw	(South Korea) Jeong Woo-geun	**(Myanmar) Kyaw Ko Ko**		(Democratic Republic of the Congo) Joël Sami (Ghana) Dominic Adiyiah
Customs United	(Brazil) **Danilo**	(Ivory Coast) **Boubacar Koné**	(Ivory Coast) **Henri Jöel**	(South Korea) **Lee Jeong-jin**			(Brazil) Alexandre Balotelli (South Korea) Yoo Byung-Soo (Brazil) **Deyvison** (Sweden) **Anders Viktor Löfgren** (Liberia) Armah Vaikainah (Japan) Kenzo Nambu
Kasetsart	(Brazil) **Machado de Souza**	(Iran) **Mehdi Chahjouyi**	(South Korea) **Park Hyun-woo**	(Japan) **Seiya Kojima**			(Ivory Coast) Coulibaly Chomana (South Korea) Kim Tae Woong (Ivory Coast) Boubacar Koné (Ivory Coast) Henri Jöel
Khonkaen	(Brazil) **Cláudio**	(Brazil) **Pedro Henrique**	(Japan) **Yuki Nohara**	(Japan) Seiya Sugishita			(Brazil) Fellipe Veloso (Brazil) Rosalvo (Brazil) Artur (Iran) **Eiman Kaabi**
Khonkaen United	(Brazil) Douglas Cobo	(Brazil) Paulo Conrado	(Spain) David Cuerva	(Oman) **Badar Ali Rashid Ali Al Alawi**	(Myanmar) **Aung Kaung Mann**		(Bahrain) Jaycee John
Lampang	(Brazil) **Alex Rafael**	(Uruguay) **Diego Emilio Silva**		(Japan) **Renshi Yamaguchi**	(Indonesia) **Todd Rivaldo Ferre**		(Netherlands) Kevin Brands (Australia) Tomas Maricic (Brazil) Rodrigo Maranhão (Myanmar) **Aung Kaung Mann** (Ivory Coast) Coulibaly Chomana (Brazil) Douglas Mineiro
Nakhon Pathom United	(Brazil) Tauã	(Brazil) **Neto Santos**	(Ghana) Lesley Ablorh	(Iran) **Hamed Bakhtiari**	(Laos) Phoutthasay Khochalern		(Brazil) Pedro Dias (Afghanistan) Mustafa Azadzoy (Brazil) Stefano Yuri
Navy	(Brazil) **Douglas**	(Brazil) Frauches		(Japan) **Tatsuya Sakai**			(Japan) Goshi Okubo (Brazil) Erivelto (Brazil) Neto Santos (Ghana) **Prince Amponsah**
Nongbua Pitchaya	(Brazil) Valdo	(Brazil) **Douglas Mineiro**	(France) **Greg Houla**	(South Korea) Cho Sung-hwan	(Malaysia) **Nicholas Swirad**		(Brazil) Marcos Vinícius (Madagascar) Njiva Rakotoharimalala (Brazil) **Tiago Chulapa**
Phrae United	(Brazil) Carlos Santos	(Brazil) Wellington Adão	(El Salvador) Mark Lester Blanco	(Japan) **Taku Ito**			(Australia) Isaka Cernak
Ranong United	(Brazil) **Rafael Roque**	(Cameroon) Kaham Seuntcha Mardochee	(Cameroon) **Frank Touko Nzola**	(Iraq) **Selwan Al Jaberi**	(Myanmar) **Suan Lam Mang**		(Brazil) Kassiano Soares (Oman) Badar Ali Rashid Ali Al Alawi (Brazil) Jhonatan Bernardo (Nigeria) Julius Chukwuma Ononiwu
Samut Sakhon	(Serbia) Nemanja Ilić	(Croatia) Igor Banović		(Kyrgyzstan) Akhlidin Israilov			(Russia) Evgeni Kabaev
Sisaket	(Ivory Coast) **Marc Landry Babo**	(Russia) **Evgeni Kabaev**	(Japan) Kento Nagasaki	(Japan) Hiromichi Katano			(Brazil) Willen Mota (Brazil) **Valci Júnior** (Brazil) Alex Ruela
Udon Thani	(Brazil) **Thales Lima**	(Croatia) Aleksandar Kapisoda	(Germany) **Arnold Suew**				(Australia) Jesse Curran (Brazil) João Paulo
Uthai Thani	(Brazil) **Felipe Wallace do Nascimento**	(Japan) **Daiki Konomura**	(Japan) **Kenzo Nambu**	(South Korea) Jong-oh Park			(Brazil) Jardel Capistrano (South Korea) Park Jae-hyeong (Brazil) Moreira (Uruguay) Diego Emilio Silva (Ghana) Prince Amponsah (Brazil) **Thales Lima** (Laos) **Soukaphone Vongchiengkham**

== League table ==
=== Standings ===
Pos	Team	Pld	W	D	L	GF	GA	GD	Pts	Qualification
1	Nongbua Pitchaya (C, P)	34	21	12	1	63	16	+47	75	Promotion to Thai League 1
2	Chiangmai United (P)	34	20	9	5	64	28	+36	69	Promotion to Thai League 1
3	Nakhon Pathom United	34	17	10	7	66	36	+30	61	Play off to Thai League 1
4	Khonkaen United (O, P)	34	18	6	10	56	37	+19	60	Play off to Thai League 1
5	Phrae United	34	16	11	7	49	27	+22	59	Play off to Thai League 1
6	Chainat Hornbill	34	16	9	9	61	47	+14	57	Play off to Thai League 1
7	Chiangmai	34	16	8	10	56	45	+11	56	
8	Ranong United	34	16	5	13	45	41	+4	53	
9	Ayutthaya United	34	13	8	13	46	45	+1	47	
10	Khonkaen	34	11	8	15	34	38	−4	41	
11	Navy	34	11	7	16	47	53	−6	40 (Note: Navy finished ahead of Lampang on head-to-head points: Navy 1–0 Lampang, Lampang 1–2 Navy.)	
12	Lampang	34	11	7	16	39	46	−7	40	
13	Customs United	34	11	6	17	37	62	−25	39	
14	Kasetsart	34	11	5	18	36	53	−17	38 (Note: Kasetsart finished ahead of Udon Thani on head-to-head points: Kasetsart 2–1 Udon Thani, Udon Thani 0–0 Kasetsart.)	
15	Udon Thani	34	9	11	14	44	46	−2	38	
16	Sisaket (R)	34	9	9	16	34	44	−10	36	Relegation to Thai League 3
17	Uthai Thani (R)	34	5	10	19	34	53	−19	25	Relegation to Thai League 3
18	Samut Sakhon (R)	34	2	5	27	25	119	−94	11	Relegation to Thai League 3

Updated to match(es) played on 31 March 2021. Source: Thai League
Rules for classification: 1) Points; 2) Head-to-head points; 3) Head-to-head goals difference; 4) Head-to-head goals scored; 5) Overall goals difference; 6) Overall goals scored; 7) Fair play points; 8) Play-off without extra time;).
(C) Champions; (O) Play-off winners; (P) Promoted; (R) Relegated

=== Promotion play-offs ===
Semi-finals
5	Phrae United	1	1	2
4	Khon Kaen United	3	2	5
6	Chainat Hornbill	1	0	1
3	Nakhon Pathom United	2	2	4

Finals
Khon Kaen United (p)	2	1	3 (4)
Nakhon Pathom United	1	2	3 (3)

==== Semi-finals ====
4 April 2021
19:00 UTC+7

Phrae United	1–3	Khon Kaen United
Léster Blanco 78'	Report; Highlight	Laksana Kamruen 31'; Douglas Cobo 53' (pen.); Palakon Woklang 70'

Huai Ma Stadium, Phrae
Attendance: 1,102
Referee: Atiwat Seelalo (Thailand)
10 April 2021
19:00 UTC+7

Khon Kaen United	2–1	Phrae United
Alongkorn Jornnathong 88'; Badar Ali Rashid Ali Al Alawi 90+3'	Report; Highlight	Léster Blanco 26'

Khon Kaen PAO. Stadium, Khon Kaen
Attendance: 0
Referee: Paisan Bendem-alee (Thailand)

Khon Kaen United won 5–2 on aggregate.

4 April 2021
19:00 UTC+7

Chainat Hornbill	1–2	Nakhon Pathom United
Warayut Klomnak 21'	Report; Highlight	Hamed Bakhtiari 18'; Lesley Ablorh 88'

Khao Plong Stadium, Chainat
Attendance: 1,952
Referee: Winat Phophat (Thailand)
10 April 2021
19:00 UTC+7

Nakhon Pathom United	2–0	Chainat Hornbill
Tauã 42' (pen.); Neto Santos 47' (pen.)	Report; Highlight

Nakhon Pathom Municipality Sport School Stadium, Nakhon Pathom
Attendance: 0
Referee: Phairot Bunkamnoed(Thailand)

Nakhon Pathom United won 4–1 on aggregate.

==== Finals ====
17 April 2021
18:00 UTC+7

Khon Kaen United	2–1	Nakhon Pathom United
Chitsanupong Choti 45'; Badar Ali Rashid Ali Al Alawi 90+1'	Report; Highlight	Lesley Ablorh 13' (pen.)

Khon Kaen PAO. Stadium, Khon Kaen
Attendance: 0
Referee: Wiwat Jumpaoon (Thailand)
24 April 2021
18:00 UTC+7

Nakhon Pathom United	2–1 (a.e.t.)	Khon Kaen United
Hamed Bakhtiari 83'; Phoutthasay Khochalern 90'	Report; Highlight	Paulo Conrado 65' (pen.)
Penalties
Phoutthasay Khochalern (penalty scored); Watcharapon Changklungmor (penalty scored); Nattaphon Worasut (penalty scored); Lesley Ablorh (penalty missed); Teerayut Ngamlamai (penalty missed)	3–4	(penalty scored) Douglas Cobo; (penalty scored) Piyawit Janput; (penalty scored) Palakon Woklang; (penalty missed) Nattapon Tabtanon; (penalty scored) Warakorn Thongbai

Nakhon Pathom Municipality Sport School Stadium, Nakhon Pathom
Attendance: 0
Referee: Warintron Sassadee (Thailand)

3–3 on aggregate. Khon Kaen United won 4–3 on penalties.

=== Positions by round ===
The table lists the positions of teams after each week of matches. In order to preserve chronological evolvements, any postponed matches are not included in the round at which they were originally scheduled, but added to the full round they were played immediately afterwards. For example, if a match is scheduled for matchday 13, but then postponed and played between days 16 and 17, it will be added to the standings for day 16.

Team ╲ Round	1	2	3	4	5	6	7	8	9	10	11	12	13	14	15	16	17	18	19	20	21	22	23	24	25	26	27	28	29	30	31	32	33	34
Nongbua Pitchaya	1	3	2	1	1	3	1	2	2	1	1	1	1	1	1	1	1	1	1	1	1	1	1	1	1	1	1	1	1	1	1	1	1	1
Chiangmai United	5	2	1	2	2	2	2	1	1	2	2	3	3	4	3	3	2	3	3	3	4	4	3	3	3	3	2	2	2	2	2	2	2	2
Nakhon Pathom United	15	8	10	11	8	10	8	9	8	7	5	5	5	3	2	4	5	6	6	6	6	6	6	5	5	5	6	4	4	3	3	3	4	3
Khonkaen United	3	1	3	5	7	9	7	6	4	2	3	2	2	2	5	2	3	2	2	2	2	2	2	2	2	2	3	3	3	4	5	4	3	4
Phrae United	16	9	6	6	3	1	4	3	5	5	7	6	6	5	6	5	4	4	4	4	3	3	4	4	4	4	4	5	6	6	4	5	6	5
Chainat Hornbill	4	10	9	10	5	5	5	8	10	9	10	10	10	10	8	8	8	8	8	9	8	8	8	8	8	7	8	7	7	7	7	6	5	6
Chiangmai	7	14	7	4	6	8	6	4	3	4	4	4	4	6	5	7	7	5	5	5	5	5	5	6	6	6	5	6	5	5	6	7	7	7
Ranong United	17	17	12	9	9	6	10	7	6	8	6	7	7	8	10	10	12	13	13	12	13	11	11	10	9	9	9	9	9	8	8	8	8	8
Ayutthaya United	13	18	18	18	15	15	15	14	11	11	9	9	9	7	7	6	6	7	7	7	7	7	7	7	7	8	7	8	8	9	9	9	9	9
Khonkaen	10	12	16	16	17	18	18	17	17	16	15	16	16	15	15	15	15	15	15	15	15	15	15	15	14	14	13	11	10	12	10	10	10	10
Navy	2	4	4	3	4	4	3	5	7	6	8	8	8	9	9	9	11	12	10	8	9	9	10	9	10	10	10	10	12	10	11	11	11	11
Lampang	14	16	11	13	13	13	12	12	9	10	11	13	13	12	11	11	9	10	9	10	11	13	13	13	12	13	14	14	14	14	14	12	13	12
Customs United	9	6	8	7	10	12	11	11	14	12	12	15	14	13	12	12	13	11	12	11	12	10	12	12	13	12	11	12	11	13	13	14	15	13
Kasetsart	18	7	13	12	14	14	14	13	15	13	14	11	12	11	13	14	10	9	11	13	10	12	9	11	11	11	12	13	13	11	12	13	12	14
Udon Thani	11	11	14	14	12	7	9	10	13	15	16	12	11	14	14	13	14	14	14	14	14	14	14	14	15	15	16	15	15	16	16	15	16	15
Sisaket	6	5	5	8	11	11	13	15	12	14	13	14	15	16	16	16	16	16	16	16	16	16	16	16	16	16	15	16	16	15	15	16	14	16
Uthai Thani	12	13	17	15	16	17	17	18	18	18	18	18	18	18	18	18	17	17	17	17	17	17	17	17	17	17	17	17	17	17	17	17	17	17
Samut Sakhon	8	15	15	17	18	16	16	16	16	17	17	17	17	17	17	17	18	18	18	18	18	18	18	18	18	18	18	18	18	18	18	18	18	18

Leader and qualification to the 2021–22 Thai League
Promotion to the 2021–22 Thai League
Play off to the 2021–22 Thai League
Relegation to the 2021–22 Thai League 3

Source: Thai League 2

=== Results by match played ===
Team ╲ Round	1	2	3	4	5	6	7	8	9	10	11	12	13	14	15	16	17	18	19	20	21	22	23	24	25	26	27	28	29	30	31	32	33	34
Nongbua Pitchaya	W	W	W	D	D	D	W	W	W	W	W	W	W	D	W	W	W	D	W	D	D	D	W	W	D	W	D	D	D	W	W	W	L	W
Chiangmai United	W	W	W	D	D	D	W	W	W	D	W	L	D	L	W	W	D	L	W	W	D	W	W	W	W	D	W	W	W	W	W	L	D	L
Nakhon Pathom United	L	W	L	D	W	L	W	L	W	W	W	D	W	W	W	L	D	L	W	D	W	D	D	D	W	D	D	W	W	W	L	W	D	W
Khonkaen United	W	W	D	L	W	W	D	W	W	D	W	W	L	L	L	W	W	W	W	D	W	W	W	W	D	D	L	L	L	L	L	W	W	L
Phrae United	L	W	W	D	W	W	L	W	L	D	L	W	W	W	D	D	W	D	W	W	W	W	L	D	D	D	L	D	L	W	W	D	D	W
Chainat Hornbill	W	L	D	D	W	W	D	L	L	D	L	W	L	W	D	W	L	W	L	D	W	D	W	W	D	W	D	W	W	L	W	W	W	L
Chiangmai	D	L	W	W	L	D	W	W	W	L	W	D	W	L	W	L	D	W	W	D	W	D	D	L	W	L	W	L	W	W	L	L	D	W
Ranong United	L	L	W	W	D	W	L	W	W	L	W	L	D	L	L	L	L	D	L	W	L	W	D	W	D	W	W	W	L	W	W	W	L	W
Ayutthaya United	L	L	L	D	W	D	L	W	W	D	W	D	W	W	W	W	D	L	L	W	L	D	D	W	W	L	W	L	L	L	L	L	D	W
Khonkaen	D	L	L	D	L	L	L	D	D	W	W	D	L	W	L	L	W	D	L	L	L	L	D	W	D	W	W	W	W	L	W	W	L	L
Navy	W	W	D	W	D	W	L	L	L	W	L	L	W	L	L	L	L	D	W	W	L	D	D	W	L	L	D	D	L	W	L	L	W	L
Lampang	L	L	W	L	W	L	W	D	W	L	L	L	D	W	W	L	W	L	W	L	L	L	D	L	D	D	L	D	D	L	W	W	L	W
Customs United	D	W	L	L	L	L	W	L	L	D	D	L	D	W	W	L	L	W	L	W	L	W	L	L	L	W	D	L	W	L	L	L	D	W
Kasetsart	L	W	L	D	L	D	L	W	L	W	L	W	L	W	D	L	W	W	L	L	W	L	W	L	L	D	L	L	W	W	L	L	D	L
Udon Thani	D	L	D	D	W	W	D	L	L	L	L	W	D	D	L	W	L	D	D	L	W	L	L	L	L	D	L	W	D	L	W	W	D	W
Sisaket	W	W	D	L	L	L	L	L	W	L	D	D	L	L	L	D	L	W	D	L	L	D	L	L	W	D	W	L	D	W	W	D	W	L
Uthai Thani	D	L	L	D	D	L	L	L	L	D	D	L	L	L	D	W	W	L	L	D	W	L	D	L	D	L	D	W	L	L	L	L	W	L
Samut Sakhon	D	L	D	L	L	W	L	L	L	D	L	L	D	L	L	W	L	L	L	L	L	D	L	L	L	L	L	L	L	L	L	L	L	L

Source: Thai League
W = Win; D = Draw; L = Lose

== Results ==
Home \ Away	AYU	CHB	CHM	CMU	CTU	KAS	KHO	KKU	LAM	NPU	NAV	NON	PRU	RNU	SAM	SIS	UDT	UTT
Ayutthaya United	—	2–0	3–2	0–1	2–2	2–1	1–2	0–1	1–2	1–1	2–3	1–1	0–2	3–1	3–0	2–1	2–1	0–1
Chainat Hornbill	2–0	—	3–1	3–1	4–2	2–0	2–0	1–1	1–2	3–3	2–1	1–1	1–0	4–1	7–1	2–0	2–2	1–1
Chiangmai	1–0	5–0	—	1–1	4–1	5–0	1–1	1–0	2–0	2–1	1–1	0–5	1–0	2–2	3–1	2–1	1–3	3–0
Chiangmai United	0–1	3–0	0–0	—	5–0	3–0	1–0	1–0	3–0	1–0	4–1	0–0	2–2	2–0	2–1	1–0	6–0	1–0
Customs United	2–0	2–3	0–3	0–1	—	2–0	1–1	0–3	2–0	0–2	2–0	1–2	1–1	2–3	0–0	2–1	1–0	1–1
Kasetsart	1–1	1–1	1–2	3–3	3–1	—	0–1	0–1	1–0	0–1	2–0	0–3	1–0	1–0	5–0	1–0	2–1	1–0
Khonkaen	1–3	2–1	4–1	0–0	0–1	1–0	—	3–3	1–0	1–2	2–3	0–1	0–0	1–2	4–1	1–2	1–3	1–0
Khonkaen United	3–0	3–0	0–0	4–1	3–1	4–1	1–1	—	2–1	0–1	2–0	1–3	1–2	1–0	3–0	0–1	2–1	4–1
Lampang	1–1	1–1	1–0	3–1	0–1	2–1	0–0	3–0	—	0–3	1–2	0–3	0–1	0–1	3–1	4–3	0–0	1–0
Nakhon Pathom United	1–1	1–2	2–0	3–2	3–0	5–1	1–1	4–0	2–2	—	4–2	0–0	0–0	0–1	6–0	3–1	4–3	4–2
Navy	2–3	0–1	2–2	0–1	4–1	1–0	0–1	0–2	1–0	0–0	—	0–1	1–2	2–0	4–0	2–4	3–2	3–1
Nongbua Pitchaya	1–1	1–0	4–1	0–0	6–0	3–0	1–0	3–1	1–1	2–2	1–2	—	3–2	0–0	5–1	4–0	1–0	1–0
Phrae United	2–0	2–1	1–3	2–2	4–1	2–0	1–0	2–0	3–0	2–0	1–1	0–1	—	1–1	4–0	2–2	0–0	1–1
Ranong United	2–0	1–0	1–2	1–1	1–3	3–2	2–1	1–2	2–1	0–1	2–1	0–1	2–1	—	2–1	1–0	3–2	0–1
Samut Sakhon	1–4	2–2	2–2	1–5	0–3	1–4	2–0	2–4	1–7	1–3	1–1	0–4	0–2	0–6	—	1–1	2–5	0–4
Sisaket	0–2	1–3	2–0	2–3	0–1	2–2	0–1	0–0	3–0	0–0	2–1	0–0	0–0	1–0	0–1	—	1–1	2–1
Udon Thani	0–1	0–2	2–0	0–2	2–0	0–0	1–0	1–1	1–1	2–1	0–0	1–1	0–2	0–2	7–0	0–0	—	1–1
Uthai Thani	2–2	3–3	0–1	0–4	0–0	0–1	0–1	1–3	0–2	3–2	2–2	0–0	1–2	1–1	5–0	0–1	1–2	—

Updated to match(es) played on 31 March 2021. Source: Thai League
Legend: Blue = home team win; Yellow = draw; Red = away team win.

== Season statistics ==
=== Top scorers ===
As of 31 March 2021.

Rank	Player	Club	Goals
1	(Brazil) Paulo Conrado	Khonkaen United	25
2	(South Korea) Yoo Byung-soo	Customs United (2 Goals); Ayutthaya United (20 Goals)	22
2	(Brazil) Tauã	Nakhon Pathom United	22
4	(Netherlands) Melvin de Leeuw	Chiangmai United	17
5	(Japan) Ryo Matsumura	Chiangmai	16
6	(Brazil) Erivelto	Navy (8 Goals); Chainat Hornbill (6 Goals)	14
6	(Brazil) Valdo	Nongbua Pitchaya	14
8	(South Korea) Jeong Woo-geun	Chiangmai United	13
9	(Japan) Seiya Sugishita	Khonkaen	12
9	(Thailand) Jiraphan Phasukhan	Nakhon Pathom United	12

=== Hat-tricks ===
Player	For	Against	Result	Date
(Brazil) Jardel Capistrano	Uthai Thani	Chainat Hornbill	3–3 (H)	1 March 2020
(Brazil) Paulo Conrado	Khonkaen United	Samut Sakhon	4–2 (A)	20 September 2020
(Brazil) Paulo Conrado	Khonkaen United	Khonkaen	3–3 (A)	3 October 2020
(Thailand) Tawin Butsombat	Chiangmai United	Udon Thani	6–0 (H)	4 October 2020
(Brazil) Tauã	Nakhon Pathom United	Kasetsart	5–1 (H)	4 October 2020
(Japan) Kento Nagasaki	Sisaket	Royal Thai Navy	4–2 (A)	4 October 2020
(Madagascar) Njiva Rakotoharimalala^{4}	Nongbua Pitchaya	Chiangmai	5–0 (A)	18 October 2020
(Brazil) João Paulo^{4}	Udon Thani	Samut Sakhon	5–2 (A)	1 November 2020
(Brazil) Machado de Souza	Kasetsart	Samut Sakhon	4–1 (A)	3 February 2021
(Thailand) Anusak Laosangthai	Ranong United	Samut Sakhon	6–0 (A)	10 February 2021
(Thailand) Apiwit Samurmuen	Kasetsart	MOF Customs United	3–1 (H)	21 February 2021
(France) Greg Houla	Nongbua Pitchaya	Samut Sakhon	5–1 (H)	24 February 2021
(South Korea) Yoo Byung-soo	Ayutthaya United	Samut Sakhon	4–1 (A)	27 February 2021
(Thailand) Warayut Klomnak	Chainat Hornbill	Samut Sakhon	7–1 (H)	3 March 2021
(Thailand) Supakit Niamkong	Customs United	Samut Sakhon	3–0 (A)	13 March 2021
(Brazil) Tauã	Nakhon Pathom United	Samut Sakhon	6–0 (H)	17 March 2021
(Thailand) Ayu Lateh	Lampang	Samut Sakhon	7–1 (A)	20 March 2021

=== Clean sheets ===
As of 24 April 2021.

Rank	Player	Club	Clean sheets
1	(Thailand) Kittikun Jamsuwan	Nongbua Pitchaya	21
2	(Thailand) Nont Muangngam	Chiangmai United	16
3	(Thailand) Nopphon Lakhonphon	Nakhon Pathom United	11
3	(Thailand) Pathomtat Sudprasert	Phrae United	11
5	(Thailand) Narit Taweekul	Khon Kaen	10
5	(Thailand) Jirawat Wangtapan	Khon Kaen United	10
7	(Thailand) Korraphat Nareechan	Chiangmai	9
8	(Thailand) Kittipun Saensuk	Chainat Hornbill	7
8	(Thailand) Piyawat Intarapim	Samut Sakhon (2), MOF Customs United (5)	7
8	(Thailand) Prin Goonchorn	Sisaket	7
8	(Thailand) Pisan Dorkmaikaew	MOF Customs United (2), Uthai Thani (5)	7
12	(Thailand) Boonyakait Wongsajaem	Navy	6
12	(Thailand) Wichaya Ganthong	Ranong United	6
14	(Thailand) Tatpicha Aksornsri	Ayutthaya United	5

== Attendances ==
=== Overall statistical table ===
Pos	Team	Total	High	Low	Average	Change
1	Khonkaen United	37,506	5,218	0	2,885	−34.3%^{†}
2	Khonkaen	27,063	4,155	0	2,082	−22.0%
3	Nongbua Pitchaya	21,432	3,098	0	1,531	+6.7%
4	Chainat Hornbill	18,572	2,315	0	1,429	−64.4%
5	Sisaket	18,171	3,540	0	1,298	−56.4%
6	Chiangmai	15,267	2,537	0	1,174	−66.3%
7	Udon Thani	13,733	2,844	0	1,144	−58.2%
8	Uthai Thani	12,086	2,680	0	930	−31.7%
9	Nakhon Pathom United	11,473	1,625	0	883	−25.6%^{†}
10	Ayutthaya United	10,899	1,873	0	838	−12.3%
11	Ranong United	11,030	1,250	0	788	+77.9%^{†}
12	Navy	10,225	1,275	0	787	−38.4%
13	Phrae United	9,868	1,237	0	759	+45.1%^{†}
14	Kasetsart	7,668	1,102	0	639	+10.0%
15	Chiangmai United	7,723	1,519	0	594	+10.4%
16	Lampang	7,176	1,059	0	552	−45.8%
17	Customs United	5,920	615	0	455	−22.5%
18	Samut Sakhon	3,813	875	0	347	−64.5%
	League total	249,625	5,218	0	1,071	−32.3%

Updated to games played on 31 March 2021
Source: Thai League
Notes:
^{†} Teams played previous season in Thai League 3

=== Attendances by home match played ===
Team \ Match played	1	2	3	4	5	6	7	8	9	10	11	12	13	14	15	16	17	Total
Ayutthaya United	1,873	1,441	831	883	1,056	892	713	756	0	0	0	0	575	531	437	420	491	10,899
Chainat Hornbill	1,992	1,372	1,781	1,559	1,336	1,022	1,013	1,129	0	0	0	0	912	1,317	1,682	1,142	2,315	18,572
Chiangmai	2,425	2,537	704	689	543	1,240	1,126	987	1,498	0	0	0	0	692	730	991	1,105	15,267
Chiangmai United	1,451	1,519	389	284	339	323	304	340	0	0	0	0	319	480	526	699	750	7,723
Customs United	615	400	480	320	580	580	300	300	500	0	0	0	0	585	200	480	580	5,920
Kasetsart	372	345	1,102	972	931	406	542	840	0	0	0	0	492	672	472	522	Unk.2	7,668
Khonkaen	4,155	3,794	1,135	1,235	1,230	3,138	3,020	2,369	0	0	0	0	1,373	1,227	1,215	1,246	1,926	27,063
Khonkaen United	5,218	5,031	1,594	1,587	1,574	3,049	3,016	3,163	3,048	0	0	0	0	1,590	1,587	2,965	2,494	37,506
Lampang	823	915	1,059	724	680	372	580	510	245	0	0	0	0	245	228	375	420	7,176
Nakhon Pathom United	1,625	1,250	710	650	721	1,350	708	732	0	0	0	0	650	680	550	747	1,100	11,473
Navy	1,275	1,260	788	1,134	690	619	709	661	0	0	0	0	726	398	618	775	572	10,225
Nongbua Pitchaya	1,692	1,623	718	593	725	1,524	1,224	2,901	827	0	0	0	1,100	1,000	2,607	1,800	3,098	21,432
Phrae United	914	1,237	658	695	698	924	596	701	729	0	0	0	0	519	567	601	1,029	9,868
Ranong United	1,200	1,250	600	650	720	568	836	578	450	0	0	0	630	660	910	960	1,018	11,030
Samut Sakhon	875	658	393	322	352	220	345	327	172	0	0	0	0	0	100	0	49	3,813
Sisaket	3,540	2,164	1,547	1,535	2,090	1,002	805	403	562	120	0	0	0	672	1,003	1,108	1,620	18,171
Udon Thani	2,844	1,335	1,500	1,500	1,500	642	717	1,191	527	0	0	0	0	Unk.1	447	552	978	13,733
Uthai Thani	2,348	2,680	588	485	810	1,066	320	503	453	0	0	0	0	450	708	925	750	12,086

Source: Thai League Note:
Unk.1 Some error of T2 official match report 3 March 2021 (Udon Thani 1–1 Khonkaen United).
Unk.2 Some error of T2 official match report 31 March 2021 (Kasetsart 0–3 Nongbua Pitchaya).

== See also ==
- 2020–21 Thai League 1
- 2020–21 Thai League 3
- 2020–21 Thailand Amateur League
- 2020–21 Thai FA Cup
- 2020–21 Thai League Cup
- 2020 Thailand Champions Cup
