= Chiangmai United F.C. =

Thai football club

Chiangmai United เชียงใหม่ ยูไนเต็ด
- Full name: Chiangmai United Football Club สโมสรฟุตบอลเชียงใหม่ ยูไนเต็ด
- Nicknames: The White Elephants (ช้างเผือก)
- Short name: CMUTD
- Founded: 2015; 11 years ago as Changphueak Chiangmai; 2017; 9 years ago as JL Chiangmai United; 2020; 6 years ago as Chiangmai United
- Ground: Chiang Mai Rajabhat University Mae Rim Campus Stadium; Mae Rim, Chiang Mai, Thailand
- Capacity: 10,000
- Chairman: Pichai Lertpongadisorn
- Head Coach: Sarathon Kerdpol
- League: Thai League 2
- 2025–26: Thai League 2, 11th of 18
Home colours	Away colours

Chiangmai United Football Club (Thai: สโมสรฟุตบอลเชียงใหม่ ยูไนเต็ด) is a Thai professional football club based in Chiang Mai province, Thailand.

== History ==
The club, originally named Changphueak Chiangmai, was founded in 2015. The club competed its first season in 2016 and won champion in the 2016 Thai Division 3 Tournament Northern Region and was promoted to Thai League 4 North Region. In 2017, the club was renamed to JL Chiangmai United with Jele as the team main sponsor.

In 2020, the club was renamed to Chiangmai United.

== Sponsors ==
The following are sponsors of CMUTD (named "CMUTD Partners"):

=== Title ===
Period	Kit Manufacturer	Title Sponsor	Co Sponsor
2017–2019	FBT	Moose Cider / Jele	
2020	VOLT	Moose Cider / Jele	Thai AirAsia
2021–2022	Grand Sport Group	Moose Cider / Jele	Thai Vietjet Air
2023–present	2S Sport	VBeyond Development	Thai Vietjet Air

=== Main ===
- Moose
- Jele
- Thai Vietjet Air
- Grand Sport Group
- Palaad Tawanron
- Nuan Bakery

== Crest history ==
2020–present

== Stadium and locations ==
Coordinates	Location	Stadium	Year
18°50′23″N 98°57′34″E	Don Kaeo, Mae Rim; Chiang Mai Province	700th Anniversary Stadium	11 February 2017 – 19 March 2017
18°47′50″N 98°57′23″E	Suthep, Mueang Chiang Mai; Chiang Mai Province	Chiang Mai University Stadium	1 – 29 April 2017
18°53′53″N 99°00′47″E	Nong Han, San Sai; Chiang Mai Province	In Tha Nin Stadium	7 May 2017 – 30 July 2017
18°48′05″N 98°59′22″E	Mueang Chiang Mai; Chiang Mai Province	Chiangmai Municipality Stadium	5 August 2017 – 8 October 2017
18°50′23″N 98°57′34″E	Don Kaeo, Mae Rim; Chiang Mai Province	700th Anniversary Stadium	18 February 2018 – 27 October 2019
18°51′28″N 99°10′43″E	Doi Saket; Chiang Mai Province	Rajamangala University of Technology Lanna Stadium (Doi Saket)	14 February 2020 – 31 March 2021
18°50′23″N 98°57′34″E	Don Kaeo, Mae Rim; Chiang Mai Province	700th Anniversary Stadium	4 September 2021 – 28 April 2025

== Season-by-season record ==
Season	League									FA Cup	League Cup	Top goalscorer	
Season	Division	P	W	D	L	F	A	Pts	Pos	FA Cup	League Cup	Name	Goals
2016	DIV 3 North	6	4	2	0	19	5	18	1st	Opted out	Ineligible		
2017	T4 North	24	15	4	5	46	17	49	1st	SF	QR1	Chatchai Narkwijit	20
2018	T3 Upper	26	17	8	1	60	31	59	1st	R2	QR1	Chatchai Narkwijit	20
2019	T2	34	10	10	14	43	43	40	11th	R1	R2	Hiziel Souza Soares	12
2020–21	T2	34	20	9	5	64	28	69	2nd	R1	–	Melvin de Leeuw	17
2021–22	T1	30	4	7	19	28	56	19	16th	R3	R2	Bill	5
2022–23	T2	34	15	9	10	36	32	54	5th	R4	R1	Melvin de Leeuw	8
2023–24	T2	34	12	13	9	52	41	49	9th	R3	QR3	Mosquito	13
2024–25	T2	32	10	10	12	41	48	40	12th	Opted out	Opted out	Elson Hooi	10
2025–26	T2	34	14	1	19	55	58	43	11th	R1	Opted out		

Champions	Runners-up	Promoted	Relegated

== Current squad ==
Note: Flags indicate national team as defined under FIFA eligibility rules; some limited exceptions apply. Players may hold more than one non-FIFA nationality.

No.	Pos.	Nation	Player
1	GK	THA	Phanuphong Sunon
3	DF	THA	Anuyut Mudlem (on loan from Lamphun Warriors)
5	DF	THA	Tossaporn Chuchin
6	DF	THA	Sakarin Sanajag
7	FW	KOR	Jeong Woo-geun
8	MF	THA	Tiwanon Sophachan
9	FW	THA	Worawut Noisri
10	MF	KOR	Seo Min-guk
11	MF	THA	Kantaphong Bandasak
13	GK	THA	Phumniwat Thuha
14	MF	THA	Suksan Kaewpanya
15	DF	THA	Bas van der Heijden
16	MF	THA	Thanaphat Waempracha
17	FW	THA	Nattawut Sanguthai
18	MF	THA	Natdanai Sangta
19	FW	THA	Yodsak Chaowana
20	MF	THA	Kiadtisak Nantavichianrit

No.	Pos.	Nation	Player
21	FW	THA	Pattara Soimalai
23	FW	THA	Varintorn Watcharapringam
24	GK	THA	Kraiwit Poungkale
26	DF	THA	Siradanai Saengngam
27	DF	THA	Suwijak Moonkaew
28	MF	THA	Wiset Monsrikanphon
36	GK	THA	Paphawin Sirithongsopha
39	FW	THA	Phitchanon Chanluang
44	FW	THA	Thanathorn Namchan (on loan from Bangkok)
47	DF	THA	Chonnaphat Wongkham
55	DF	THA	Ronnapee Choeykamdee (captain)
66	DF	THA	Chatchon Jairangsee
77	MF	THA	Jakree Pankam
78	MF	THA	Yodsaphon Mueangsuwan
88	FW	BRA	Wellington Adão
93	DF	KOR	Lee Jae-yong
99	MF	THA	Athaset Thongnak

== Coaching staff ==
Position	Name
Head Coach	(Thailand) Sarathon Kerdpol
Assistant Coach	(Thailand) Surachai Jirasirichote (Thailand) Atchawut Khueantana (Thailand) Surachai Namrat
Goalkeeping Coach	(Thailand) Krit Pinyo
Fitness Coach	(Thailand) Jirachai Linglom
Analyst	(Thailand) Badindet Chamchoy
Physiotherapist	(Thailand) Phuwanat Thongchatravilai
Sport Scientist	(Thailand) Sarawut Thasingkham
Kitman	(Thailand) Rawiphat Jaimu (Thailand) Jirawat Simanta
Marketing Communications & Media Manager	(Thailand) Nitipong Yuantrakul
Club Photographer & Media Staff	(Thailand) Peerayu Niamsub
Team Officer	(Thailand) Pichit Srisawad (Thailand) Sathaporn Chantanakhet
Sport Marketing & Creative	(Thailand) Supanut Charoenrat
General Manager	(Thailand) Bannasit Wiangsamut
Team Manager	(Thailand) Srisopha Kotkhamlue

== Coaches ==
Coaches by Years (2016–present)

- (Thailand) Chalongchai Leelahacheewa 2016–2017
- (Thailand) Peerapat Pasithakarnkul 2017
- (Thailand) Apichart Mosika 2017–2018
- (Thailand) Surachai Jirasirichote 2018
- (Thailand) Chusak Sriphum 2018
- (Thailand) Somchai Makmool 2018–2019
- (Brazil) Leones Pereira dos Santos 2019
- (Thailand) Surachai Jirasirichote 2019
- (Brazil) Carlos Eduardo Parreira 2020
- (Germany) Dennis Amato 2020–2021
- (Thailand) Surapong Kongthep 2021
- (Brazil) Ailton Silva 2021–2022
- (Thailand) Chusak Sriphum 2022
- (Thailand) Somchai Chuayboonchum 2022–2023
- (Brazil) Wanderley Junior 2023
- (Thailand) Surachai Jirasirichote 2023–2024
- (Venezuela) Jeffrén Suárez 2024
- (Thailand) Anucha Chaiyawong (Caretaker) 2024–2026
- (Thailand) Achira Thongjerm 2026
- (Thailand) Sarawut Wongmai 2026
- (Thailand) Sarathon Kerdpol 2026–

== Honours ==
=== Domestic leagues ===
- Thai League 2
  - Runners-up (1): 2020–21
- Thai League 3
  - Champions (1): 2018
- Thai League 3 Upper Region
  - Champions (1): 2018
- Thai League 4 Northern Region
  - Champions (1): 2017
- Football Division 3
  - Champions (1): 2016
