= Kittikun Jamsuwan =

Thai footballer

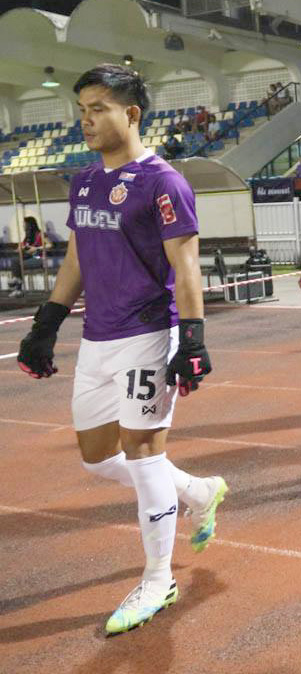
- Kittikun Jamsuwan playing for Nongbua Pitchaya.

Personal information
- Full name: Kittikun Jamsuwan
- Date of birth: 9 June 1984 (age 42)
- Place of birth: Kalasin, Thailand
- Height: 1.80 m (5 ft 11 in)
- Position: Goalkeeper

Team information
- Current team: Nongbua Pitchaya
- Number: 15

Senior career*
Years	Team	Apps	(Gls)
2007–2009	TOT	42	(0)
2010–2012	Buriram United	4	(0)
2013–2015	BBCU	74	(0)
2016	Navy	0	(0)
2017	Lampang	24	(0)
2017–2019	Sukhothai	31	(0)
2020–	Nongbua Pitchaya	110	(0)
- * Club domestic league appearances and goals as of 1 September 2024 ‡ National team caps and goals as of 5 February 2009

Kittikun Jamsuwan (Thai: กิตติคุณ แจ่มสุวรรณ, born June 9, 1984) is a Thai professional footballer who plays as a goalkeeper for Thai League 1 club Nongbua Pitchaya.

== Honours ==
=== Club ===
Buriram United

- Thai Premier League (1): 2011
- Thai FA Cup (2): 2011, 2012
- Thai League Cup (2): 2011, 2012

Nongbua Pitchaya

- Thai League 2 (1): 2020–21
