= Dennis Murillo =

Brazilian footballer (born 1992)

Personal information
- Full name: Dennis Murillo Skrzypiec
- Date of birth: 28 April 1992 (age 34)
- Place of birth: Curitiba, Brazil
- Height: 1.85 m (6 ft 1 in)
- Position: Striker

Team information
- Current team: Nakhon Ratchasima
- Number: 23

Youth career
- 2009: Athletico Paranaense

Senior career*
| Years | Team | Apps | (Gls) |
| 2010–2012 | Athletico Paranaense | 0 | (0) |
| 2011 | → Tupi (loan) | 5 | (1) |
| 2013 | Ponte Preta | 2 | (0) |
| 2013–2014 | Paysandu | 8 | (0) |
| 2015 | Rio Claro | 5 | (0) |
| 2015 | Guarani | 1 | (0) |
| 2015–2016 | São Raimundo | 0 | (0) |
| 2016 | Chiangrai United | 15 | (5) |
| 2016 | → Super Power Samut Prakan (loan) | 12 | (4) |
| 2017–2018 | PTT Rayong | 0 | (0) |
| 2019 | Nongbua Pitchaya | 15 | (7) |
| 2019 | PTT Rayong | 15 | (7) |
| 2019–2021 | Nakhon Ratchasima | 28 | (21) |
| 2021–2023 | Chonburi | 36 | (13) |
| 2023–2024 | Lamphun Warriors | 17 | (6) |
| 2024– | Nakhon Ratchasima | 22 | (9) |
- * Club domestic league appearances and goals as of 15 June 2025

Dennis Murillo Skrzypiec (born April 28, 1992), simply known as Dennis Murillo, is a Brazilian footballer who plays as a striker for Nakhon Ratchasima in Thai League 1.

== Honours ==
=== Individual ===
- Thai League 1 Best XI: 2020–21
