= Sarawut Treephan =

Thai footballer and coach (born 1979)

Personal information
- Full name: Sarawut Treephan
- Date of birth: 15 October 1979 (age 47)
- Place of birth: Nakhon Si Thammarat, Thailand
- Height: 1.70 m (5 ft 7 in)
- Position: Right back

Senior career*
Years	Team	Apps	(Gls)
2000–2005	Bangkok Christian College		
2006–2009	Chula United		

International career
2000–2003	Thailand U23		

Managerial career
- 2009–2012: Muangthong United (assistant)
- 2013: Nonthaburi
- 2014: Customs United
- 2015: Thonburi City
- 2015–2016: Chainat Hornbill (assistant)
- 2017: Bangkok
- 2019: Simork
- 2020–2021: Port
- 2021–2022: Port (caretaker)
- 2022–2023: Songkhla
- 2023–2024: Suphanburi
- 2024–2025: Krabi
- 2026: Port
Medal record
Thailand under-23
Sea Games
Gold medal – first place	Sea Games 2001	Football
- * Club domestic league appearances and goals as of 22 June 2008

Sarawut Treephan (Thai สระราวุฒิ ตรีพันธ์) is a Thai professional football manager and former player who was most recently the head coach of Thai League 1 club Port.

== Managerial statistics ==
As of 25 September 2026

Managerial record by team and tenure
Team	Nat.	From	To	Record					Ref.
Team	Nat.	From	To	G	W	D	L	Win %	Ref.
Bangkok	(Thailand)	1 January 2017	18 June 2018	1	0	0	1	0.00	
Port	(Thailand)	26 September 2020	20 July 2021	33	18	7	8	54.55	
Port (caretaker)	(Thailand)	11 November 2021	21 February 2021	14	6	3	5	42.86	
Songkhla	(Thailand)	5 May 2022	22 May 2023	29	19	6	4	65.52	
Suphanburi	(Thailand)	12 December 2023	31 July 2024	20	6	3	11	30.00	
Krabi	(Thailand)	1 August 2024	2 March 2026	9	2	1	6	22.22	
Port	(Thailand)	3 March 2026	25 September 2026	15	11	2	2	73.33	
Career Total				121	62	22	37	51.24	

== Honours ==
=== Player ===
Bangkok Christian College

- Thai Division 1 League: 2001

Chula United

- Thai Division 2 League: 2006

Thailand U 23

- Sea Games Gold medal: 2001

=== Manager ===
Songkhla

- Thai League 3 Southern Region: 2022–23

Port

- Thai League Cup: 2025–26

Individual

- Thai League 1 Coach of the Month: October 2020, April 2026, May 2026
