= Watcharapon Changklungmor =

Thai footballer (born 1988)

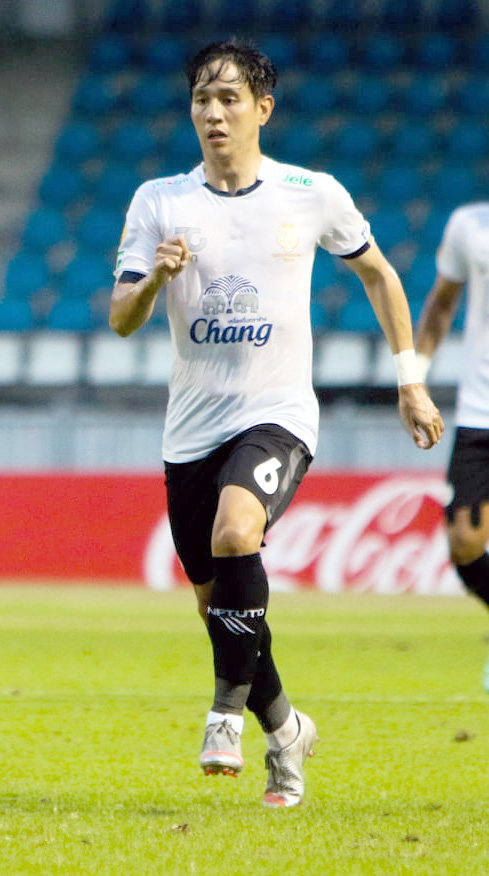

Personal information
- Full name: Watcharapon Changklungmor
- Date of birth: June 30, 1988 (age 38)
- Place of birth: Thailand
- Position: Right-back

Senior career*
Years	Team	Apps	(Gls)
2016	Khon Kaen United		
2017–2018	Sukhothai	12	(1)
2018	→ Sisaket (loan)		
2019–2022	Nakhon Pathom United	57	(1)
- * Club domestic league appearances and goals as of 27 March 2022

Watcharapon Changklungmor (Thai: วัชรพล ช่างกลึงเหมาะ, born June 30, 1988) is a Thai professional footballer who plays as a right-back.
