= Samart Group =

- Type: Public
- ISIN: TH0374010Z09
- Industry: Conglomerate
- Founded: 1955
- Founder: Cherdchai Vilailuck
- Headquarters: Nonthaburi, Thailand
- Area served: Southeast Asia
- Key people: Charoenrath Vilailuck, President and CEO
- Revenue: ▲US$1.2 billion (2014)
- Subsidiaries: Samart Corporation (SET: SAMART); Samart I-Mobile (SET: SDC); Samart Telecom (SET: SAMTEL); Samart Engineering
- Website: www.samartcorp.com

Samart Group or simply Samart (Thai: สามารถ) is a Thai group of companies which focuses on telecommunication, Consumer electronics industry. It is the parent company of Samart Corporation, Samart I-Mobile, Samart Telecom. It is listed in the Stock Exchange of Thailand.

The company was founded as Samart shop in 1955, a small electronic repair shop at Saraburi Province.
