= Dennis Nieblas =

Spanish footballer (born 1990)

Personal information
- Full name: Dennis Nieblas Moreno
- Date of birth: 16 October 1990 (age 36)
- Place of birth: Terrassa, Spain
- Height: 1.89 m (6 ft 2 1/2 in)
- Position: Centre back

Team information
- Current team: Höttur/Huginn

Youth career
- 2004–2006: Terrassa
- 2006–2009: Mercantil
- 2009–2010: Europa

Senior career*
Years	Team	Apps	(Gls)
2010–2011	Olesa	2	(0)
2011–2012	Manresa	23	(1)
2012–2013	Masnou	28	(0)
2013–2014	Trofense	26	(0)
2014–2015	Othellos Athienou	7	(0)
2015	Shabab Al Ordon	12	(2)
2015–2016	Guadalajara	6	(2)
2016–2017	SV Kapfenberg	6	(1)
2017	River Ecuador	2	(0)
2017	Linense	10	(1)
2018	Víkingur	17	(0)
2019	Toledo		
2020	Ayutthaya United	4	(0)
2020	Chiangmai	7	(1)
2021	Chainat Hornbill	14	(3)
2021–2022	Ayutthaya United	20	(2)
2022	Chainat Hornbill	13	(0)
2023	Ibiza	8	(0)
2023	ENAD PS	8	(0)
2024	Grindavík	16	(3)
2025	Costa d'Amalfi	8	(0)
2025–2026	Grindavík	22	(1)
2026	Manchester 62	3	(0)
2026–	Höttur/Huginn	0	(0)
- * Club domestic league appearances and goals as of 20 June 2026

Dennis Nieblas Moreno (born 16 October 1990) is a Spanish professional footballer who plays as a defender for 3. deild karla club Höttur/Huginn.

== Club career ==
Born in Terrassa, Barcelona, Catalonia, Nieblas was a CE Europa youth graduate. After making his debuts as a senior with CF Olesa, he subsequently represented CE Manresa and CD Masnou, all of them in the regional leagues.

On 1 July 2013 Nieblas moved abroad, signing a one-year contract with Portuguese Segunda Liga side C.D. Trofense. He made his professional debut on 17 August, coming on as a late substitute for Mateus Fonseca in a 1–2 away loss against FC Porto B.

In August 2014, after being named the best defender of the league, Nieblas joined Othellos Athienou F.C. in Cyprus. After being sparingly used he switched teams and countries again, signing for Jordanian side Shabab Al Ordon and joining fellow Spaniards Toni Espinosa and José Pedrosa Galán.

On 1 September 2015 Nieblas returned to his home country, after agreeing to a contract with Segunda División B side CD Guadalajara.

On 30 January 2019, Nieblas joined CD Toledo.
