= Don Kaeo, Mae Rim =

Coordinates: 18.8567°N 98.9689°E

Don Kaew ดอนแก้ว
- Tambon
- Interactive map of Don Kaew
- Country: Thailand
- Province: Chiang Mai
- District: Mae Rim

Population (2005)
  - Total: 14,286
- Time zone: UTC+7 (ICT)

Don Kaew, Mae Rim (Thai: ดอนแก้ว) is a tambon (subdistrict) of Mae Rim District, in Chiang Mai Province, Thailand. In 2005, it had a population of 14,286 people. The tambon contains 10 villages.
