= I-Mobile =

Thai mobile phone company

- Company type: Public
- Traded as: SET: SDC
- Industry: Consumer electronics
- Founded: 1995
- Defunct: 2017
- Headquarters: Nonthaburi, Thailand
- Area served: Southeast Asia
- Key people: Supachai Pisitvanich (Chairman); Watchai Vilailuck (Chief Executive Officer)
- Products: Mobile phone Smartphone
- Revenue: ▼3,461 million baht (2016)
- Net income: ▼ -720 million baht (2016)
- Total assets: ▼7,975 million baht (2016)
- Total equity: ▼2,397 million baht (2016)
- Parent: Samart Group

Samart I-Mobile Public Company Limited (Thai: บริษัท สามารถ ไอ-โมบาย จำกัด (มหาชน) ) or simply I-Mobile (ไอ-โมบาย) was a Thai mobile phone company. It was a subsidiary of Samart Group. It was one of leading local mobile phone brands in Thailand. The company was founded in 1995 and was headquartered in Nonthaburi, Thailand. I-Mobile smartphones run on Android OS.

I-Mobile had own stores called "i-mobile by SAMART" to distribute IT devices, mobile phones, accessories, SIM cards, and provide after sales services nationwide. In 2014, it had the fourth largest market share with 9.2 percent of mobile phones in Thailand. The market was expanding from Thailand to overseas markets in Malaysia, Cambodia, Indonesia, Myanmar, Laos, Hong Kong, India, Bangladesh, and Sri Lanka.

In 2017, I-Mobile decided to liquidate the business after a loss for a period of 2–3 years consecutively and focusing on operating a digital business instead.
