= Park Tae-hyeong =

South Korean footballer

Personal information
- Full name: Park Tae-hyeong
- Date of birth: 7 April 1992 (age 34)
- Place of birth: South Korea
- Height: 1.87 m (6 ft 1 1/2 in)
- Position: Centre back

Team information
- Current team: Nongbua Pitchaya
- Number: 4

Youth career
- 2008–2010: Ulsan Hyundai
- 2011–2014: Dankook University

Senior career*
Years	Team	Apps	(Gls)
2015–2016	Goyang Zaicro	49	(0)
2017	Gyeongju KHNP	13	(0)
2018	Daejeon Korail	20	(2)
2019	Siheung City FC	1	(0)
2019–2020	Rayong	12	(0)
2021–	Nongbua Pitchaya	4	(0)
- * Club domestic league appearances and goals

Park Tae-hyeong (Korean: 박태형; born April 7, 1992) is a South Korean footballer who plays as a centre back.

== Honour ==
Nongbua Pitchaya

- Thai League 2 Champions : 2020–21
