= Jele =

Jele is a surname. Notable people with the surname include:

- Bongani Jele, South African cricket umpire
- Cynthia Jele, South African novelist
- Happy Jele (born 1987), South African football defender
- Josiah Jele, South African politician, diplomat, and activist
- Lydia Jele (born 1990), Botswanan athlete
- Sipho Jele (died 2010), Swazi activist
