= Masami Taki =

Japanese football manager

Personal information
- Full name: Masami Taki
- Date of birth: 28 June 1972 (age 54)
- Place of birth: Japan

Managerial career
- Years: Team
- 2009–2010: Thai Honda
- 2014–2015: Thai Honda
- 2020: Chiangrai United
- 2020–2021: Rayong
- 2021: PT Prachuap
- 2021–2022: Rayong

Masami Taki (滝 雅美, Taki Masami) is a Japanese football manager.

== Coaching career ==
Taki started his coaching career at the age of 22. He was U18 coach at Cerezo Osaka and had experience as an academy coach at Vissel Kobe and Jubilo Iwata. In 2009, he was brought over to Thailand to become head coach at Thai Honda.

== Managerial statistics ==
As of match played 13 November 2021.

Managerial record by team and tenure
Team	From	To	Record				
Team	From	To	P	W	D	L	Win %
Chiangrai United	1 December 2019	3 November 2020	14	7	2	5	50.00
Rayong	12 November 2020	28 March 2021	20	3	3	14	15.00
PT Prachuap	30 March 2021	15 November 2021	14	2	3	9	14.29
Total			48	12	8	28	25.00

== Honours ==
Chiangrai United

- Thailand Champions Cup (1): 2020
