= Somchai Maiwilai =

Thai football manager

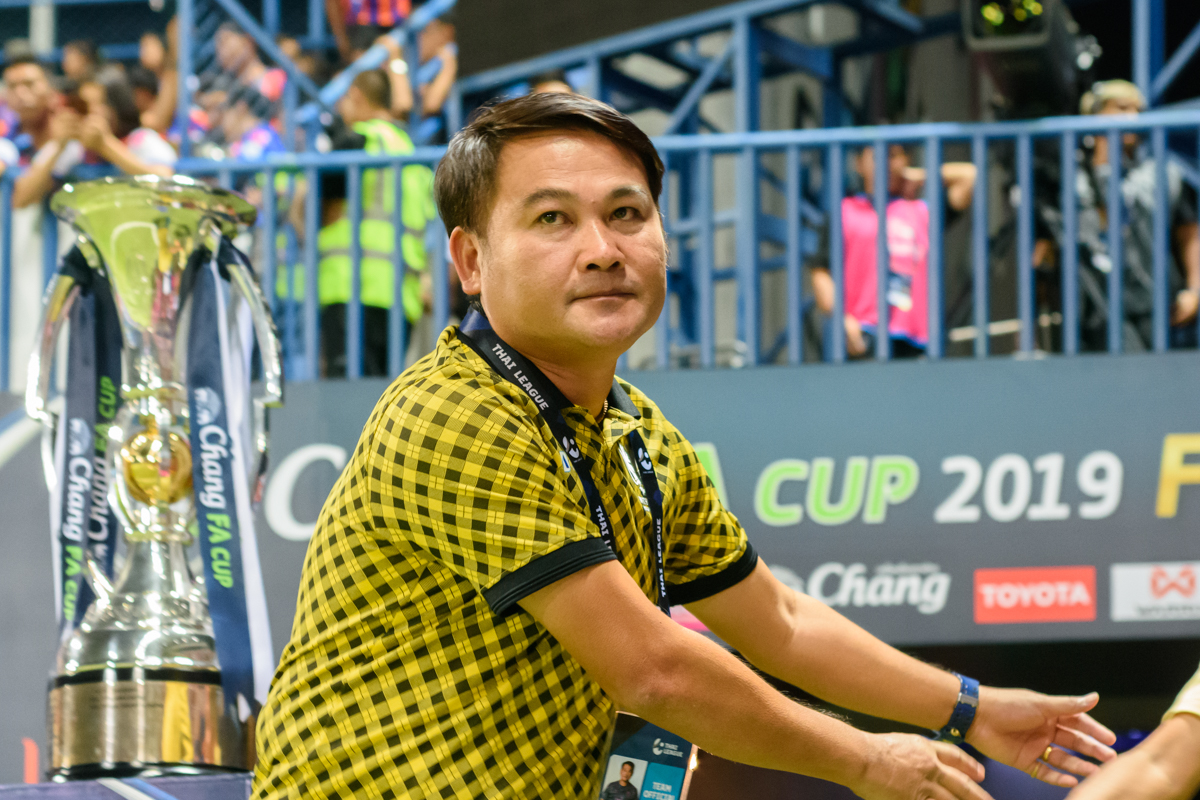

Personal information
- Full name: Somchai Maiwilai
- Date of birth: 27 June 1970 (age 56)
- Place of birth: Ratchaburi, Thailand

Team information
- Current team: Ratchaburi

Managerial career
- Years: Team
- 2009–2010: Ratchaburi
- 2010–2013: Ratchaburi Mitr Phol
- 2014: Ratchaburi Mitr Phol (assistant)
- 2018: Ratchaburi Mitr Phol (caretaker)
- 2019: Ratchaburi Mitr Phol (caretaker)
- 2020: Ratchaburi Mitr Phol (caretaker)
- 2020–: Ratchaburi Mitr Phol (assistant)
- 2020–2022: Ratchaburi Mitr Phol
- 2024: Ratchaburi Mitr Phol (Caretaker)

Somchai Maiwilai (Thai: สมชาย ไม้วิลัย, born 27 June 1970) is a Thai football manager, who is the currently assistant coach of Thai League 1 club Ratchaburi Mitr Phol.

== Managerial statistics ==
As of match played 9 November 2024

Managerial record by team and tenure
Team	From	To	Record							
Team	From	To	G	W	D	L	GF	GA	GD	Win %
Ratchaburi	1 January 2009	30 November 2013	17	2	7	8	11	18	−7	11.76
Ratchaburi	16 March 2018	20 August 2018	26	13	6	7	48	36	+12	50.00
Ratchaburi	17 July 2019	20 October 2019	12	7	2	3	24	20	+4	58.33
Ratchaburi	25 December 2020	31 August 2021	22	5	7	10	20	29	−9	22.73
Ratchaburi	17 September 2024	19 November 2024	7	3	2	2	14	10	+4	42.86
Total			84	30	24	30	117	113	+4	35.71

== Honours ==
Ratchaburi

- 2011 Regional League Division 2 Central & Eastern Region: 2011
- 2012 Thai Division 1 League: 2012
- 2012 Thai League Cup runner-up: 2012
- 2019 Thai FA Cup runner-up: 2019
