= Chaitud Uamtham =

Thai football manager

Personal information
- Full name: Chaitud Uamtham
- Place of birth: Thailand

Managerial career
- Years: Team
- 2020: Ratchaburi Mitr Phol

Chaitud Uamtham (Thai: ชัยธัช อ่วมธรรม) is a Thai football manager.
