= Chusak Sriphum =

Thai football manager

Personal information
- Full name: Chusak Sriphum
- Date of birth: 16 September 1976 (age 50)
- Place of birth: Saraburi, Thailand

Managerial career
- Years: Team
- 2009–2010: Saraburi
- 2011: Loei City
- 2012: Paknampho NSRU
- 2013: Kasetsart
- 2014: Sukhothai
- 2015–2016: Rayong
- 2017: Kasetsart
- 2018: Muang Loei United
- 2018: JL Chiangmai
- 2018: Laos U19
- 2018–2020: Rayong
- 2020: Sisaket
- 2020–2022: Saraburi United
- 2022: Chiangmai United
- 2022–2023: Rayong
- 2023: Sukhothai
- 2023–2024: Kasetsart

Chusak Sriphum (Thai: ชูศักดิ์ ศรีภูมิ; born 16 September 1976) is a Thai football manager.

== Managerial statistics ==
As of match played 14 January 2024

Managerial record by team and tenure
| Team | From | To | Record | | | | |
| Team | From | To | P | W | D | L | Win % |
|---|---|---|---|---|---|---|---|
| Kasetsart | 24 May 2017 | 18 August 2017 | 1 | 0 | 0 | 1 | 0.00 |
| Muang Loei United | 1 January 2018 | 23 July 2018 | 1 | 0 | 0 | 1 | 0.00 |
| Rayong | 20 October 2018 | 28 February 2020 | 41 | 20 | 7 | 14 | 48.78 |
| Sisaket | 6 August 2020 | 29 September 2020 | 4 | 0 | 0 | 4 | 0.00 |
| Saraburi United | 30 October 2020 | 6 June 2022 | 5 | 2 | 2 | 1 | 40.00 |
| Chiangmai United | 6 June 2022 | 28 August 2022 | 3 | 1 | 1 | 1 | 33.33 |
| Rayong | 1 November 2022 | 30 May 2023 | 24 | 11 | 6 | 7 | 45.83 |
| Sukhothai | 22 July 2023 | 3 October 2023 | 5 | 1 | 1 | 3 | 20.00 |
| Kasetsart | 5 October 2023 | 17 January 2024 | 15 | 3 | 1 | 11 | 20.00 |
| Total | | | 99 | 38 | 18 | 43 | 38.38 |
