= 2022–23 BG Pathum United F.C. season =

Association football season

BG Pathum United
2022–23 season
- Chairman: (Thailand) Pavin Bhirombhakdi
- Manager: (Japan) Makoto Teguramori (until 24 October) (Japan) Mitsuo Kato (caretaker, from 24 October to 29 October) (Australia) Matt Smith (from 29 October to 19 March) (Thailand) Supachai Komsilp (interim, from 19 March to 8 May) (Thailand) Thongchai Sukkoki (from 8 May 2023)
- Stadium: BG Stadium, Thanyaburi, Pathum Thani, Thailand
- Thai League 1: 5th
- FA Cup: Fourth round
- League Cup: Second round
- Champions Cup: Winners
- 2022 ACL: Quarter-finals

The 2022–23 season is BG Pathum United's third consecutive season in Thai League 1, following promotion in 2019.

In addition to the domestic league, the club will also compete in this season's editions of the Thai FA Cup and the AFC Champions League.

== Squad ==
As of 10 May 2022.

Squad No.	Name	Nationality	Date of birth (age)	Previous club	Contract Till
Goalkeepers
19	Kiadtiphon Udom	(Thailand)	26 June 2000 (age 26)	(Thailand) Chiangmai F.C.	2023
26	Kittipong Phuthawchueak	(Thailand)	26 September 1989 (age 36)	(Thailand) Police Tero	2023
32	Supanai Juntrapasit	(Thailand)	1 April 2004 (age 22)	Youth Team	2023
39	Prasit Padungchok	(Thailand)	13 October 1982 (age 43)	(Thailand) Police Tero	2023
Defenders
5	Chonnapat Buaphan	(Thailand)	22 March 2004 (age 22)	(Thailand) Lamphun Warriors F.C.	
13	Ernesto Phumipha	(Thailand)	16 April 1990 (age 36)	(Thailand) Samut Prakan City F.C.	2023
14	Yusuke Maruhashi	(Japan)	2 September 1990 (age 35)	(Japan) Cerezo Osaka	2023
15	Apisit Sorada	(Thailand)	28 February 1997 (age 29)	(Thailand) Chiangmai F.C.	2023
16	Jakkapan Praisuwan	(Thailand)	16 August 1994 (age 31)	(Thailand) Samut Prakan City F.C.	2024
17	Irfan Fandi	(Singapore)	13 August 1997 (age 28)	(Singapore) Garena Young Lions	2026
22	Santipharp Chan-ngom	(Thailand)	23 September 1996 (age 29)	(Thailand) Police Tero	2023
23	Adisak Sosungnoen	(Thailand)	13 March 1996 (age 30)	(Thailand) Khon Kaen United F.C.	2023
30	Andrés Túñez	(Venezuela)	15 March 1987 (age 39)	(Thailand) Buriram United	2023
33	Wattanakorn Sawatlakhorn	(Thailand)	23 May 1998 (age 28)	(Thailand) Muangthong United	2023
41	Cássio Scheid	(Brazil)	3 January 1994 (age 32)	(Portugal) Varzim S.C.	2023
90	Suwit Paipromrat	(Thailand)	30 September 1996 (age 29)	(Thailand) Chiangmai F.C.	2023
Midfielders
4	Chaowat Veerachat	(Thailand)	23 June 1996 (age 30)	(Japan) Cerezo Osaka	2025
6	Sarach Yooyen	(Thailand)	30 May 1992 (age 34)	(Thailand) Muangthong United	2026
24	Chatmongkol Thongkiri	(Thailand)	5 May 1997 (age 29)	(Thailand) Muangthong United	2023
28	Nattaphon Worasut	(Thailand)	19 January 1997 (age 29)	(Thailand) Nakhon Ratchasima F.C.	2023
36	Phitiwat Sukjitthammakul	(Thailand)	1 February 1995 (age 31)	(Thailand) Chiangrai United	2023
Strikers
7	Ben Azubel	(Israel)	19 September 1993 (age 32)	(Australia) Perth Glory FC	2023
9	Surachat Sareepim	(Thailand)	24 October 1986 (age 39)	(Thailand) Police United F.C.	2023
10	Teerasil Dangda	(Thailand)	6 June 1988 (age 38)	(Japan) Shimizu S-Pulse	2023
29	Chatree Chimtalay	(Thailand)	14 December 1983 (age 42)	(Thailand) Bangkok F.C.	2023
31	Stênio Júnior	(Brazil)	10 June 1991 (age 35)	(Thailand) Chiangmai F.C.	2023
47	Thammayut Rakbun	(Thailand)	7 March 1997 (age 29)	(Thailand) Rajpracha F.C.	2023
98	Korawich Tasa	(Thailand)	7 April 2000 (age 26)	(Thailand) Muangthong United	2023
99	Ikhsan Fandi	(Singapore)	9 April 1999 (age 27)	(Norway) FK Jerv	2024
77	Patrik Gustavsson	(Thailand) (Sweden)	19 April 2001 (age 25)	(Thailand) Chiangmai F.C.	2025
Players loaned out during season
1	Chatchai Budprom	(Thailand)	4 February 1987 (age 39)	(Thailand) Chiangrai United	2025
3	Saharat Pongsuwan (D)	(Thailand)	11 June 1996 (age 30)	(Thailand) PT Prachuap	2023
5	Victor Cardozo (D)	(Brazil)	19 December 1989 (age 36)	(Thailand) PTT Rayong	2022
8	Worachit Kanitsribampen (M)	(Thailand)	24 August 1997 (age 28)	(Thailand) Chonburi F.C.	2025
13	Tawan Khotrsupho (F)	(Thailand)	23 January 2000 (age 26)	(Thailand) Chiangmai F.C.	
18	Pathompol Charoenrattanapirom (M)	(Thailand)	21 April 1994 (age 32)	(Thailand) Police Tero	2023
19	Chenrop Samphaodi (F)	(Thailand)	2 June 1995 (age 31)	(Thailand) Port F.C.	2022
21	Lidor Cohen (F)	(Israel)	16 December 1992 (age 33)	(Thailand) Nongbua Pitchaya	2023
21	Rattanachat Niamthaisong (G)	(Thailand)	21 May 2001 (age 25)	(Thailand) Rajpracha F.C.	2025
27	Jesse Curran (D)	(Philippines)	16 July 1996 (age 30)	(Philippines) Kaya FC	2023
27	Kevin Ingreso (M)	(Philippines)	10 February 1993 (age 33)	(Thailand) Samut Prakan City F.C.	2024
31	Fahas Bilanglod (G)	(Thailand)	3 March 1999 (age 27)	(Thailand) Chiangmai F.C.	2022
33	Piyachanok Darit (D)	(Thailand)	5 November 1992 (age 33)	(Thailand) Chiangmai F.C.	
34	Sarawut Koedsri (D)	(Thailand)	29 April 1989 (age 37)	(Thailand) Rajpracha F.C.	2022
35	Siroch Chatthong (F)	(Thailand)	8 December 1992 (age 33)	(Thailand) Chiangrai United	2022
48	Kanokpon Buspakom (M)	(Thailand)	20 September 1999 (age 26)	(Thailand) Police Tero	2027
63	Athibordee Atirat (D)	(Thailand)	28 February 1992 (age 34)	(Thailand) Rajpracha F.C.	
91	Tanin Kiatlerttham (D)	(Thailand)	23 August 2000 (age 25)	(Thailand) Rajpracha F.C.	
97	Phongrawit Jantawong (F)	(Thailand)	7 October 2000 (age 25)	(Thailand) Chiangmai F.C.	
	Somyot Pongsuwan (D)	(Thailand)	10 September 1993 (age 32)	(Thailand) PT Prachuap	
	Sarawin Saengra (M)	(Thailand)	9 September 1997 (age 28)	(Thailand) Chiangmai F.C.	
	Thanakrit Laorkai (M)	(Thailand)	22 December 2003 (age 22)	(Thailand) Rajpracha F.C.	
	Supasak Sarapee (D)	(Thailand)	5 April 2000 (age 26)	(Thailand) Chiangmai F.C.	
	Chitchanok Xaysensourinthone	(Thailand)	23 August 1994 (age 31)	(Thailand) Nakhon Ratchasima F.C.	2022
Players left during season
7	Diogo	(Brazil)	26 May 1987 (age 39)	(Malaysia) Johor Darul Ta'zim	2023
11	Jaroensak Wonggorn	(Thailand)	18 May 1997 (age 29)	(Thailand) Samut Prakan City F.C.	2024
20	Paulo Conrado (F)	(Brazil)	18 July 1991 (age 35)	(Thailand) Trat	2023

== Transfer ==
=== In ===
Pre-Season

Position	Player	Transferred from	Ref
DF	(Thailand) Adisak Sosungnoen	(Thailand) Khon Kaen United F.C.	Undisclosed
DF	(Brazil) Cássio Scheid	(Portugal) Varzim S.C.	Free
DF	(Philippines) (Australia) Jesse Curran	(Philippines) Kaya FC	Free
MF	(Thailand) Jaroensak Wonggorn	(Thailand) Samut Prakan City F.C.	Undisclosed
MF	(Thailand) Phitiwat Sukjitthammakul	(Thailand) Chiangrai United F.C.	Undisclosed
FW	(Israel) Lidor Cohen	(Thailand) Nongbua Pitchaya F.C.	Free
FW	(Brazil) Paulo Conrado	(Thailand) Trat F.C.	Free

Note 1:

Mid-Season

Position	Player	Transferred from	Ref
DF	(Thailand) Wattanakorn Sawatlakhorn	(Thailand) Muangthong United	Exchange for (Thailand) Jaroensak Wonggorn
FW	(Thailand) Korawich Tasa	(Thailand) Muangthong United	Exchange for (Thailand) Jaroensak Wonggorn
FW	(Brazil) Stênio Júnior	(Thailand) Chiangmai F.C.	Undisclosed
FW	(Israel) Ben Azubel	(Australia) Perth Glory FC	Free

=== Out ===
Pre-Season

Position	Player	Transferred To	Ref
DF	(Thailand) Tossaphol Chomchon	(Thailand) Khon Kaen United	Free
DF	(Thailand) Yodrak Namuangrak	(Thailand) Rayong	Free
MF	(Thailand) Siwakorn Sangwong	(Thailand) Rayong	Free
MF	(Thailand) Peerapong Pichitchotirat	Retired	NA
MF	(Thailand) Sumanya Purisay	(Thailand) Chonburi	Free

Note 1:

Mid-Season

Position	Player	Transferred To	Ref
FW	(Brazil) Diogo	-	Free
MF	(Thailand) Jaroensak Wonggorn	(Thailand) Muangthong United F.C.	Exchange for (Thailand) Wattanakorn Sawatlakhorn & (Thailand) Korawich Tasa
FW	(Brazil) Paulo Conrado	(Vietnam) Dong A Thanh Hoa	Undisclosed

=== Loan In ===
Mid-Season

Position	Player	Transferred from	Ref
DF	(Thailand) Suwit Paipromrat	(Thailand) Khon Kaen United F.C.	Season loan
DF	(Japan) Yusuke Maruhashi	(Japan) Cerezo Osaka	Season loan

Note 1:

=== Loan Out ===
Pre-Season

Position	Player	Transferred To	Ref
GK	(Thailand) Korraphat Nareechan	(Thailand) Police Tero F.C.	Season loan
GK	(Thailand) Rattanachat Niamthaisong	(Thailand) Chanthaburi F.C.	Season loan
GK	(Thailand) Fahas Bilanglod	(Thailand) Chiangmai F.C.	Season loan
GK	(Thailand) Kiadtiphon Udom	(Thailand) Chiangmai F.C.	Season loan
DF	(Thailand) Suwannapat Kingkaew	(Thailand) Chiangmai F.C.	Season loan
DF	(Thailand) Sarawut Koedsri	(Thailand) Chiangmai F.C.	Season loan
DF	(Thailand) Chaiyapruek Chirachin	(Thailand) Chiangmai F.C.	Season loan
DF	(Thailand) Supasak Sarapee	(Thailand) Chiangmai F.C.	Season loan
DF	(Thailand) Thammayut Tonkham	(Thailand) Chiangmai F.C.	Season loan
DF	(Thailand) Tanin Kiatlerttham	(Thailand) Chiangmai F.C.	Season loan
DF	(Thailand) Piyachanok Darit	(Thailand) Chiangmai F.C.	Season loan
DF	(Thailand) Ronnayod Mingmitwan	(Thailand) Chiangmai F.C.	Season loan
DF	(Brazil) Victor Cardozo	(Thailand) Chiangrai United F.C.	Season loan
DF	(Thailand) Athibordee Atirat	(Thailand) Chiangrai United F.C.	Season loan
DF	(Thailand) Chonnapat Buaphan	(Thailand) Lamphun Warriors	Season loan
MF	(Philippines) Kevin Ingreso	(Malaysia) Pahang (Note: Join Pahang on loan until Dec 2022)	Season loan till Dec 2023
MF	(Thailand) Chaowat Veerachat	(Japan) Cerezo Osaka	Season loan till Dec 2022
MF	(Japan) Ryo Matsumura	(Indonesia) Persis Solo	Season loan
FW	(Thailand) Chenrop Samphaodi	(Thailand) Lamphun Warriors	Undisclosed
FW	(Thailand) Siroch Chatthong	(Thailand) Nakhon Ratchasima	Season loan
FW	(Thailand) Tawan Khotrsupho	(Thailand) Chiangmai F.C.	Season loan
FW	(Thailand) (Sweden) Patrik Gustavsson	(Thailand) Chiangmai F.C.	Season loan
FW	(Thailand) Pongrawit Jantawong	(Thailand) Chiangmai F.C.	Season loan

Mid-Season

Position	Player	Transferred To	Ref
GK	(Thailand) Chatchai Budprom	(Thailand) PT Prachuap F.C.	Season loan
DF	(Thailand) Saharat Pongsuwan	(Thailand) PT Prachuap F.C.	Season loan
DF	(Philippines) (Australia) Jesse Curran	(Thailand) Chonburi F.C.	Season loan
MF	(Thailand) Worachit Kanitsribampen	(Thailand) Port F.C.	Season loan
MF	(Thailand) Pathompol Charoenrattanapirom	(Thailand) Port F.C.	Season loan
MF	(Thailand) Kanokpon Buspakom	(Thailand) Nakhon Ratchasima F.C.	Season loan
FW	(Thailand) (Switzerland) Chitchanok Xaysensourinthone	(Thailand) Chiangmai F.C.	Season loan
FW	(Israel) Lidor Cohen	(Thailand) Khon Kaen United F.C.	Season loan

=== Return from loan ===
Pre-Season

Position	Player	Transferred from	Ref
GK	(Thailand) Kiadtiphon Udom	(Thailand) Chiangmai F.C.	Loan return
GK	(Thailand) Rattanachat Neamtaisong	(Thailand) Rajpracha F.C.	Loan return
GK	(Thailand) Korraphat Nareechan	(Thailand) Police Tero F.C.	Loan return
DF	(Thailand) Ronnayod Mingmitwan	(Thailand) Rajpracha F.C.	Loan return
DF	(Thailand) Somyot Pongsuwan	(Thailand) Chiangmai F.C.	Loan return
DF	(Thailand) Chaiyapruek Chirachin	(Thailand) Chiangmai F.C.	Loan return
DF	(Thailand) Supasak Sarapee	(Thailand) Chiangmai F.C.	Loan return
DF	(Thailand) Athibordee Atirat	(Thailand) Rajpracha F.C.	Loan return
DF	(Thailand) Tanin Kiatlerttham	(Thailand) Rajpracha F.C.	Loan return
DF	(Thailand) Thammayut Tonkham	(Thailand) Rajpracha F.C.	Loan return
DF	(Thailand) Yordrak Namuangrak	(Thailand) Rajpracha F.C.	Loan return
DF	(Thailand) Suwannapat Kingkaew	(Thailand) Ratchaburi F.C.	Loan return
DF	(Thailand) Saharat Pongsuwan	(Thailand) PT Prachuap F.C.	Loan return
DF	(Thailand) Piyachanok Darit	(Thailand) Suphanburi F.C.	Loan return
MF	(Japan) Ryo Matsumura	(Thailand) Police Tero F.C.	Loan return
MF	(Thailand) Thanakrit Laorkai	(Thailand) Rajpracha F.C.	Loan return
MF	(Thailand) Siwakorn Sangwong	(Thailand) Rayong F.C.	Loan return
MF	(Philippines) Kevin Ingreso	(Thailand) Samut Prakan City	Loan return
FW	(Thailand) Siroch Chatthong	(Thailand) Chiangrai United	Loan return
FW	(Thailand) Phongrawit Jantawong	(Thailand) Chiangmai F.C.	Loan return
FW	(Thailand) Tawan Khotrsupho	(Thailand) Chiangmai F.C.	Loan return
FW	(Thailand) (Sweden) Patrik Gustavsson	(Thailand) Chiangmai F.C.	Loan return

Note 1: Kevin Ingreso loan to Sri Pahang FC (Malaysia) was further extended till Dec 2023.

Note 2: Siroch Chatthong returned to the club and moved on to Nakhon Ratchasima for another loan.

Mid-Season

Position	Player	Transferred from	Ref
GK	(Thailand) Kiadtiphon Udom	(Thailand) Chiangmai F.C.	Loan return
DF	(Thailand) Chonnapat Buaphan	(Thailand) Lamphun Warriors	Loan Return
MF	(Thailand) Chaowat Veerachat	(Japan) Cerezo Osaka	Loan Return
FW	(Thailand) (Sweden) Patrik Gustavsson	(Thailand) Chiangmai F.C.	Loan return

=== Extension / Retained ===
Position	Player	Ref
GK	(Thailand) Chatchai Budprom	3 years extension till 2025
DF	(Venezuela) Andrés Túñez	1-year extension till 2023
FW	(Thailand) Surachat Sareepim	1-year extension till 2023

== Friendlies ==
=== Pre-Season Friendly ===
Win Draw Loss

16 July 2022 1	Ratchaburi Mitr Phol	1–2	BG Pathum United	Ratchaburi
18:00 UTC+7			Ikhsan Fandi; Conrado	Stadium: Mitr Phol Stadium

21 July 2022 2	BG Pathum United	4–2	Nakhon Si United	Pathum Thani
18:00 UTC+7	Ikhsan Fandi; Adisak Sensom (o.g.); Adisak Sosungnoen; Teerasil Dangda			Stadium: BG Stadium

23 July 2022 3	BG Pathum United	3–0	Chiangmai	Pathum Thani
18:00 UTC+7	Worachit Kanitsribampen; Phitiwat Sukjitthammakul; Sarach Yooyen			Stadium: BG Stadium

30 July 2022 4	BG Pathum United	5–1	Police Tero	Pathum Thani
18:00 UTC+7	Ikhsan Fandi; Conrado; Jaroensak Wonggorn; Diogo			Stadium: BG Stadium

7 August 2022 5	BG Pathum United	4–0	Chanthaburi	Pathum Thani
18:00 UTC+7	Diogo; Conrado; Surachat Sareepim			Stadium: BG Stadium

=== Mid-Season Friendly ===
Win Draw Loss

12 November 2022 2022 J.League Asia Challenge	BG Pathum United (Thailand)	1–3	(Japan) Kawasaki Frontale	Pathum Thani
17:00 UTC+7	Conrado 63'	Report	Chinen 57'; Tachibanada 65'; Yamamura (red card) 70'; Marcinho 75'	Stadium: BG Stadium

== Competitions ==
=== Champions Cup ===
==== Matches ====
Win Draw Loss

6 August 2022 Final	Buriram United	2–3	BG Pathum United	Nakhon Ratchasima
18:00 UTC+7	Jonathan Bolingi 33', 84' (pen.)		Pathompol Charoenrattanapirom 6'; Ikhsan Fandi 38'; Worachit Kanitsribampen 51'	Stadium: 80th Birthday Stadium; Referee: Torpong Somsing

=== Thai League 1 ===
==== Matches ====
Win Draw Loss

31 August 2022 1 (Rescheduled)	Chonburi	1–0	BG Pathum United	Chonburi
18:00 UTC+7	Danilo Alves 23', (yellow card) 55'; Channarong Promsrikaew (yellow card) 25'; Phithak Phimpae (yellow card) 55'; Kritsada Kaman (yellow card) 88'	Report	Phitiwat Sukjitthammakul (yellow card) 18'	Stadium: Chonburi Stadium; Attendance: 4,953; Referee: Songkran Bunmeekiart; Man of the Match: Danilo Alves (Chonburi)

14 September 2022 2 (Rescheduled)	BG Pathum United	4–2	Port	Pathum Thani
18:00 UTC+7	Irfan Fandi 18'; Ikhsan Fandi 42'; Teerasil Dangda 67'; Conrado 80', (yellow card) 81'		Teerasak Poeiphimai 45+3'; William Weidersjö 90+3'; Tanaboon Kesarat (red card) 36'; Hamilton (yellow card) 41'	Stadium: BG Stadium; Attendance: 6,470; Referee: Winat Phophat; Man of the Match: Sarach Yooyen (BG Pathum United)

12 October 2022 3 (Rescheduled)	BG Pathum United	3–1	Police Tero	Pathum Thani
18:00 UTC+7	Worachit Kanitsribampen 7'; Conrado 67'; Jaroensak Wonggorn 76'; Phitiwat Sukjitthammakul (yellow card) 57'		Isaac Honny 83'	Stadium: BG Stadium; Attendance: 5,323; Referee: Wiwat Champa-on; Man of the Match: Teerasil Dangda (BG Pathum United)

4 September 2022 4	Buriram United	2–2	BG Pathum United	Buriram
18:30 UTC+7	Goran Čaušić 59' (pen.); Supachai Chaided 90+3', (yellow card) 45'		Narubadin Weerawatnodom 26' (o.g.); Ikhsan Fandi 29'; Andrés Túñez (yellow card) 20'; Saharat Pongsuwan (yellow card) 50'; Sarach Yooyen (yellow card) 53'; Teerasil Dangda (yellow card) 57'; Kittipong Phuthawchueak (yellow card) 58'; Santiphap Channgom (yellow card) 70'; Jaroensak Wonggorn (yellow card) 90+6' (yellow-red card) 90+8'	Stadium: Chang Arena; Attendance: 21,648; Referee: Sarayut Chakngoen; Man of the Match: Santiphap Channgom (BG Pathum United)

9 September 2022 5	BG Pathum United	1–0	Lamphun Warriors	Pathum Thani
19:00 UTC+7	Pathompol Charoenrattanapirom 72'; Chatmongkol Thongkiri (yellow card) 89'		Kike Linares (yellow card) 39'; Ognjen Mudrinski (yellow card) 53'; Chaiyawat Buran (yellow card) 57'; Thiti Thumporn (yellow card) 67'	Stadium: BG Stadium; Attendance: 5,559; Referee: Vitsavet Sangnakon; Man of the Match: Pathompol Charoenrattanapirom (BG Pathum United)

18 September 2022 6	PT Prachuap	2–2	BG Pathum United	Prachuap Khiri Khan
17:30 UTC+7	Samuel Rosa Gonçalves 17', (yellow card) 86'; Lossémy Karaboué 32'; Eakkanut Kongket (yellow card) 67'		Worachit Kanitsribampen 24'; Teerasil Dangda 34'; Irfan Fandi (yellow card) 42'; Chatmongkol Thongkiri (yellow card) 66'; Phitiwat Sukjitthammakul (yellow card) 68'	Stadium: Sam Ao Stadium; Attendance: 2,420; Referee: Chaireag Ngam-som; Man of the Match: Aris Zarifović (PT Prachuap)

1 October 2022 7	BG Pathum United	3–0	Muangthong United	Pathum Thani
19:30 UTC+7	Pathompol Charoenrattanapirom 53'; Jesse Curran 82'; Jaroensak Wonggorn 86'; Teerasil Dangda (yellow card) 41'; Andrés Túñez (yellow card) 45'			Stadium: BG Stadium; Attendance: 10,034; Referee: Songkran Bunmeekiart; Man of the Match: Phitiwat Sukjitthammakul (BG Pathum United)

8 October 2022 8	Nongbua Pitchaya	1–0	BG Pathum United	Nong Bua Lamphu
				Stadium: Pitchaya Stadium

16 October 2022 9	BG Pathum United	2–0	Khon Kaen United	Pathum Thani
	Teerasil Dangda 29' (pen.); Pathompol Charoenrattanapirom 33'			Stadium: BG Stadium; Attendance: 5,669

23 October 2022 10	Bangkok United	2–0	BG Pathum United	Pathum Thani
	Vander 63'; Mahmoud Eid 88'; Thossawat Limwannasathian (yellow card) 65'		Cássio Scheid (yellow card) 18'; Sarach Yooyen (yellow card) 28'; Jakkapan Praisuwan (yellow card) 85'	Stadium: Thammasat Stadium

29 October 2022 11	BG Pathum United	2–2	Lampang	Pathum Thani
	Sarach Yooyen 23'; Conrado 70'		Mosquito 12' 43' (pen.)	Stadium: BG Stadium; Attendance: 5,476

6 November 2022 12	Nakhon Ratchasima	0–4	BG Pathum United	Nakhon Ratchasima
			Teerasil Dangda 9'; Ikhsan Fandi 45+2' 59'; Lidor Cohen 81'	Stadium: 80th Birthday Stadium

9 November 2022 13 (Rescheduled)	BG Pathum United	0–1	Sukhothai	Pathum Thani
				Stadium: BG Stadium; Attendance: 4,452

20 November 2022 14	Ratchaburi	3–0	BG Pathum United	Ratchaburi
				Stadium: Dragon Solar Park

26 November 2022 15	BG Pathum United	3–1	Chiangrai United	Pathum Thani
	Ikhsan Fandi 17'; Teerasil Dangda 44'; Andrés Túñez 74'		Kim Ji-min 10'	Stadium: BG Stadium; Attendance: 5,372

22 January 2023 16	Port	2–1	BG Pathum United	Bangkok
	Hamilton 44' 68'		Stênio Júnior 63' (pen.)	Stadium: PAT Stadium

29 January 2023 17	Police Tero	0-0	BG Pathum United	Bangkok
				Stadium: Boonyachinda Stadium

4 February 2023 18	BG Pathum United	0-2	Buriram United	Pathum Thani
		Report	Haris Vučkić 11'; Suphanat Mueanta 71'	Stadium: BG Stadium; Attendance: 10,089; Referee: Wiwat Jampa-oon

11 February 2023 19	Lamphun Warriors	3-0	BG Pathum United	Lamphun
	Sarawut Inpaen 13'; Bill 35'; Maung Maung Lwin 86'			Stadium: Lamphun Province Stadium

18 February 2023 20	BG Pathum United	2-1	PT Prachuap	Pathum Thani
	Apisit Sorada 2'; Teerasil Dangda 58'		Aris Zarifović 31'	Stadium: BG Stadium

25 February 2023 21	Muangthong United	1-0	BG Pathum United	Nonthaburi
	Jaroensak Wonggorn 84'			Stadium: Thunderdome Stadium

5 March 2023 22	BG Pathum United	1-3	Nongbua Pitchaya	Pathum Thani
	Teerasil Dangda 27' (pen.)		Barros Tardeli 39' (pen.) 46'; Islam Batran 45+3'	Stadium: BG Stadium

12 March 2023 23	Khon Kaen United	0-0	BG Pathum United	Khon Kaen
				Stadium: Khon Kaen Stadium

17 March 2023 24	BG Pathum United	0-1	Bangkok United	Pathum Thani
			Manuel Bihr 3'	Stadium: BG Stadium

8 April 2023 25	BG Pathum United	5-2	Nakhon Ratchasima	Pathum Thani
	Surachat Sareepim 57'; Stênio Júnior 71'; Teerasil Dangda 72'; Korawich Tasa 83'; Sarach Yooyen 90+3'		Charlie Clough 34'; Tyronne del Pino 53'	Stadium: BG Stadium

4 April 2023 26 (Rescheduled)	Lampang	0-1	BG Pathum United	Lampang
			Stênio Júnior 73'	Stadium: Lampang Province

22 April 2023 27	Sukhothai	2-0	BG Pathum United	Sukhothai
				Stadium: Thalay Luang Stadium

30 April 2023 28	BG Pathum United	4-2	Ratchaburi	Pathum Thani
				Stadium: BG Stadium

6 May 2023 29	Chiangrai United	2-1	BG Pathum United	Chiangrai
				Stadium: Leo Chiangrai Stadium

14 May 2023 30	BG Pathum United	1-0	Chonburi	Pathum Thani
				Stadium: BG Stadium

Pos	Team	Pld	W	D	L	GF	GA	GD	Pts	Qualification
1	Buriram United (Note: As 2021–22 Thai League 1 winners) (C, Q)	30	23	5	2	75	27	+48	74	Qualification for 2023–24 AFC Champions League group stage
2	Bangkok United (Q)	30	19	5	6	55	22	+33	62	Qualification for 2023–24 AFC Champions League group stage
3	Port (Q)	30	14	10	6	52	38	+14	52	Qualification for 2023–24 AFC Champions League qualifying play-offs
4	Muangthong United	30	14	8	8	56	37	+19	50	
5	Chiangrai United	30	12	8	10	44	42	+2	44	
6	Chonburi	30	13	4	13	46	38	+8	43 (Note: Chonburi ahead on head-to-head points record; Chonburi 6 pts, Police Tero 0 pt.)	
7	Police Tero	30	11	10	9	41	43	−2	43	
8	Ratchaburi	30	10	11	9	32	29	+3	41 (Note: Ratchaburi ahead on head-to-head goals difference; Ratchaburi 3–0 BG Pathum United, BG Pathum United 4–2 Ratchaburi.)	
9	BG Pathum United (Note: As 2021–22 Thai League 1 runners-up) (Q)	30	12	5	13	42	39	+3	41	Qualification for 2023–24 AFC Champions League qualifying play-offs
10	Lamphun Warriors	30	9	9	12	27	36	−9	36	
11	PT Prachuap	30	9	8	13	44	51	−7	35	
12	Sukhothai	30	8	10	12	27	43	−16	34	
13	Khonkaen United	30	7	12	11	24	42	−18	33	
14	Nakhon Ratchasima (R)	30	7	8	15	31	53	−22	29	Relegation to Thai League 2
15	Nongbua Pitchaya (R)	30	5	6	19	27	47	−20	21	Relegation to Thai League 2
16	Lampang (R)	30	4	7	19	24	60	−36	19	Relegation to Thai League 2

Updated to match(es) played on 12 May 2023. Source: Thai League
Rules for classification: 1) Points; 2) Head-to-head points; 3) Head-to-head goals difference; 4) Head-to-head goals scored; 5) Overall goals difference; 6) Overall goals scored; 7) Fair play points; 8) Play-off without extra time;).
(C) Champions; (Q) Qualified for the phase indicated; (R) Relegated

=== Thai FA Cup ===
==== Matches ====
Win Draw Loss

2 November 2022 Second round	BG Pathum United	3–0	Kasem Bundit University (T3)	Pathum Thani
19:00 UTC+7	Ikhsan Fandi 13', 69'; Jakkapan Praisuwan 66'			Stadium: BG Stadium; Attendance: 2,846; Referee: Thapakorn Thongkon; Man of the Match: Ikhsan Fandi (BG Pathum United)

30 November 2022 Third round	BG Pathum United	7–1	Lampang	Pathum Thani
19:00 UTC+7	Teerasil Dangda 22', 60'; Cássio Scheid 50'; Ikhsan Fandi 52', 56'; Pathompol Charoenrattanapirom 82', 84'		Andrey Coutinho 71' (pen.)	Stadium: BG Stadium; Attendance: 3,016; Referee: Natee Choosuwan; Man of the Match: Teerasil Dangda (BG Pathum United)

8 February 2023 Round of 16	BG Pathum United	1-0	Lamphun Warriors	Pathum Thani
19:00 UTC+7	Teerasil Dangda 19'			Stadium: BG Stadium

1 March 2023 QF	BG Pathum United	1-2	Police Tero	Pathum Thani
19:00 UTC+7	Teerasil Dangda 6'		Jakkapan Praisuwan 47' (o.g.); Chanukun Karin 73'	Stadium: BG Stadium

=== Thai League Cup ===
==== Matches ====
Win Draw Loss

16 November 2022 First round	Udon Thani (T2)	1–3	BG Pathum United	Udon Thani
19:00 UTC+7	Greg Houla 26'		Teerasil Dangda 7', 38', 64'	Stadium: Institute of Physical Education Udon Thani Stadium; Attendance: 1,860; Referee: Natee Choosuwan; Man of the Match: Teerasil Dangda (BG Pathum United)

25 January 2023 Second round	Nakhon Pathom United (T2)	2–3	BG Pathum United	Nakhon Pathom
	Thanawat Montree 16'; Athit Berg 43' (pen.)		Stênio Júnior 3'; Sarach Yooyen 15'; Parinya Autapol 74' (o.g.)	Stadium: Nakhon Pathom Municipality Sport School Stadium; Attendance: 1,789; Referee: Sivakorn Pu-udom

22 February 2023 QF	Chiangmai F.C. (T2)	0-3	BG Pathum United	Chiangmai
			Apisit Sorada 27'; Irfan Fandi 37'; Ben Azubel 79'	Stadium: Chiang Mai Municipality Stadium

26 April 2023 SF	BG Pathum United	2-1	Ratchaburi	Bangkok
				Stadium: PAT Stadium

20 May 2023 Final	BG Pathum United	0-2	Buriram	Nonthaburi
				Stadium: Thunderdome Stadium

=== 2022 AFC Champions League ===
==== Group stage ====
Pos	Team	Pld	W	D	L	GF	GA	GD	Pts	Qualification	BGP	MCY	JND	UCT
1	(Thailand) BG Pathum United (H)	6	3	3	0	11	2	+9	12	Advance to Round of 16	—	1–1	0–0	5–0
2	(Australia) Melbourne City	6	3	3	0	10	3	+7	12		0–0	—	2–1	3–0
3	(South Korea) Jeonnam Dragons	6	2	2	2	5	5	0	8		0–2	1–1	—	2–0
4	(Philippines) United City	6	0	0	6	1	17	−16	0		1–3	0–3	0–1	—

Source: AFC
Rules for classification: Tiebreakers
(H) Hosts

16 April 2022 Matchday 1	BG Pathum United (Thailand)	1–1	(Australia) Melbourne City	Pathum Thani, Thailand
18:00 UTC+7	Teerasil Dangda 35'	Report	Andrew Nabbout 22'; Marco Tilio (yellow card) 55'; Jordan Bos (yellow card) 75'	Stadium: Pathum Thani Stadium; Attendance: 3,189; Referee: Mooud Bonyadifar (Iran); Man of the Match: (Thailand) Pathompol Charoenrattanapirom

19 April 2022 Matchday 2	Jeonnam Dragons (South Korea)	0–2	(Thailand) BG Pathum United	Pathum Thani, Thailand
18:00 UTC+7	Lee Kyu-hyuk (yellow card) 45+2'; Jang Soon-hyeok (yellow card) 90+4'	Report	Pathompol Charoenrattanapirom 51'; Jakkapan Praisuwan 72'; Chatmongkol Thongkiri (yellow card) 59'; Kanokpon Buspakom (yellow card) 90+4'; Chenrop Samphaodi (yellow card) 90+4'	Stadium: Pathum Thani Stadium; Attendance: 2,671; Referee: Qasim Al-Hatmi (Oman; Man of the Match: (Thailand) Sarach Yooyen

22 April 2022 Matchday 3	BG Pathum United (Thailand)	5–0	(Philippines) United City	Pathum Thani, Thailand
18:00 UTC+7	Kanokpon Buspakom 42'; Worachit Kanitsribampen 75'; Diogo 80'; Alan Robertson 82' (o.g.); Pathompol Charoenrattanapirom 87'; Jakkapan Praisuwan (yellow card) 90+2'	Report		Stadium: Pathum Thani Stadium; Attendance: 2,752; Referee: Saoud Al Athbah (Qatar); Man of the Match: (Brazil) Diogo Luís Santo

25 April 2022 Matchday 4	United City (Philippines)	1–3	(Thailand) BG Pathum United	Pathum Thani, Thailand
21:00 UTC+7	Mark Hartmann 79'; Kenshiro Daniels (yellow card) 9'	Report	Diogo 17'; Ikhsan Fandi 29', 39'; Peerapong Pichitchotirat (yellow card) 61'; Andrés Túñez (yellow card) 78'	Stadium: Pathum Thani Stadium; Attendance: 2,227; Referee: Zaid Thamer (Iraq); Man of the Match: (Singapore) Ikhsan Fandi

28 April 2022 Matchday 5	Melbourne City (Australia)	0–0	(Thailand) BG Pathum United	Pathum Thani, Thailand
18:00 UTC+7	Taras Gomulka (yellow card) 36'; Rostyn Griffiths (yellow card) 85'; Scott Jamieson (yellow card) 90+1'	Report	Pathompol Charoenrattanapirom (yellow card) 21'; Worachit Kanitsribampen (yellow card) 85'	Stadium: Pathum Thani Stadium; Attendance: 3,699; Referee: Ammar Al-Jeneibi (United Arab Emirates); Man of the Match: (Thailand) Sarach Yooyen

1 May 2022 Matchday 6	BG Pathum United (Thailand)	0–0	(South Korea) Jeonnam Dragons	Pathum Thani, Thailand
18:00 UTC+7	Irfan Fandi (yellow card) 19'; Teerasil Dangda (yellow card) 45+1'; Chaowat Veerachat (yellow card) 90+2'	Report	Lee Hoo-kwon (yellow card) 47'; Jang Soon-hyeok (yellow card) 71'	Stadium: Pathum Thani Stadium; Attendance: 4,581; Referee: Mooud Bonyadifar (Iran); Man of the Match: (Thailand) Kittipong Phuthawchueak

==== Knockout stage ====
Round of 16

19 August 2022 Round of 16	BG Pathum United (Thailand)	4–0	(Hong Kong) Kitchee SC	Saitama, Japan
17:00 UTC+9	Worachit Kanitsribampen 34'; Ikhsan Fandi 39'; Teerasil Dangda 69'; Chatmongkol Thongkiri 87'; Santiphap Channgom (yellow card) 45+1'; Irfan Fandi (yellow card) 75'	Report	Cleiton (yellow card) 9'	Stadium: Urawa Komaba Stadium; Attendance: 258; Referee: Adham Makhadmeh (Jordan); Man of the Match: (Thailand) Phitiwat Sukjitthammakul

Quarter-finals

22 August 2022 Quarter-finals	Urawa Red Diamonds (Japan)	4–0	(Thailand) BG Pathum United	Saitama, Japan
20:00 UTC+9	Karlsson 32'; Iwanami 42'; Koizumi 65'; Akimoto 72'	Report		Stadium: Saitama Stadium 2002; Attendance: 16,210; Referee: Mohammed Al-Hoish (Saudi Arabia); Man of the Match: (Sweden) David Moberg Karlsson

== Team statistics ==
=== Appearances and goals ===
As of 30 May 2023

No.	Pos.	Player	League 1		FA Cup		League Cup		Thailand Champions Cup		AFC Champions League		Total	
No.	Pos.	Player	Apps.	Goals	Apps.	Goals	Apps.	Goals	Apps.	Goals	Apps.	Goals	Apps.	Goals
2	DF	(Thailand) Nakin Wisetchat	4+2	0	2	0	0+1	0	0	0	0	0	6	0
4	MF	(Thailand) Chaowat Veerachat	12+1	0	2	0	4	0	0	0	0	0	14	0
5	DF	(Thailand) Chonnapat Buaphan	5+3	0	1	0	1	0	0	0	0	0	7	0
6	MF	(Thailand) Sarach Yooyen	26+2	3	4	0	5	1	1	0	2	0	34	2
7	FW	(Israel) Ben Azubel	3+6	0	0+1	0	1+1	1	0	0	0	0	10	1
9	FW	(Thailand) Surachat Sareepim	2+8	1	0	0	0+4	0	0	0	0+2	0	9	0
10	FW	(Thailand) Teerasil Dangda	21+4	11	3	4	4	4	1	0	2	1	28	15
13	DF	(Thailand) Ernesto Phumipha	3+3	0	1	0	1	0	0	0	0	0	7	0
14	DF	(Japan) Yusuke Maruhashi	12+2	0	2	0	5	0	0	0	0	0	15	0
15	DF	(Thailand) Apisit Sorada	11+8	1	2+1	0	1+1	1	0	0	0+1	0	24	2
16	DF	(Thailand) Jakkapan Praisuwan	23+3	0	1+3	1	5	0	0+1	0	0+2	0	32	1
17	DF	(Singapore) Irfan Fandi	9+3	1	3	0	1+2	1	1	0	2	0	19	2
22	DF	(Thailand) Santipharp Chan-ngom	21+4	0	2	0	4+1	0	0	0	2	0	28	0
23	DF	(Thailand) Adisak Sosungnoen	5+3	0	0+1	0	0+1	0	0	0	0	0	8	0
24	MF	(Thailand) Chatmongkol Thongkiri	3+5	0	1+1	0	0+1	0	0+1	0	0+1	1	13	1
26	GK	(Thailand) Kittipong Phuthawchueak	28	0	4	0	5	0	1	0	2	0	35	0
28	MF	(Thailand) Nattaphon Worasut	8+1	0	1+1	0	1	0	0	0	0	0	8	0
29	FW5	(Thailand) Chatree Chimtalay	5+7	0	1+2	0	0+1	0	0	0	0	0	12	0
30	DF	(Venezuela) Andrés Túñez	13	1	2	0	2	0	0+1	0	2	0	16	1
31	FW	(Brazil) Stênio Júnior	10+1	3	1	0	4	2	0	0	0	0	9	3
33	DF	(Thailand) Wattanakorn Sawatlakhorn	3+2	0	0+1	0	0	0	0	0	0	0	2	0
34	DF	(Thailand) Sarawut Koedsri	0	0	0	0	0	0	0	0	0	0	0	0
36	MF	(Thailand) Phitiwat Sukjitthammakul	22+2	0	3	0	4	1	1	0	2	0	28	1
39	GK	(Thailand) Prasit Padungchok	2	0	0	0	0	0	0	0	0	0	0	0
41	DF	(Brazil) Cássio Scheid	16+2	0	2	1	2+1	0	1	0	0	0	20	1
47	DF	(Thailand) Thammayut Rakbun	0+1	0	0	0	0	0	0	0	0	0	0	0
77	FW	(Thailand) (Sweden) Patrik Gustavsson	8+4	1	0+2	0	1+2	0	0	0	0	0	11	0
90	DF	(Thailand) Suwit Paipromrat	0+4	0	0	0	0+1	0	0	0	0	0	5	0
98	FW	(Thailand) Korawich Tasa	2+5	1	0	0	0+1	0	0	0	0	0	4	0
99	FW	(Singapore) Ikhsan Fandi	11+3	5	2	4	0	0	1	1	2	1	19	11
Players who have played this season and/or sign for the season but had left the club on loan to other club
1	GK	(Thailand) Chatchai Budprom	0	0	0	0	0	0	0	0	0	0	0	0
3	DF	(Thailand) Saharat Pongsuwan	6+3	0	1	0	1	0	1	0	2	0	14	0
8	MF	(Thailand) Worachit Kanitsribampen	12+2	2	1	0	0+1	0	1	1	2	1	19	4
18	MF	(Thailand) Pathompol Charoenrattanapirom	9+4	3	0+2	2	0	0	1	1	2	0	18	6
20	FW	(Brazil) Conrado	4+9	3	0+1	0	1	0	0	0	0	0	15	3
21	FW	(Israel) Lidor Cohen	3+6	1	1	0	1	0	0	0	0	0	11	1
27	DF	(Philippines) Jesse Curran	1+5	1	0+1	0	0	0	1	0	0	0	8	1
48	MF	(Thailand) Kanokpon Buspakom	1+2	0	0+2	0	0+1	0	0	0	0	0	6	0
Players who have played this season and/or sign for the season but had left the club permanently
7	FW	(Brazil) Diogo Luís Santo	2+4	0	0	0	0	0	0+1	0	0+2	0	9	0
11	MF	(Thailand) Jaroensak Wonggorn	4+8	2	1	0	1	0	0+1	0	0+2	0	17	2
