= 2021–22 BG Pathum United F.C. season =

Association football season

BG Pathum United
2021–22 season
- Chairman: Pavin Bhirombhakdi
- Manager: Makoto Teguramori
- Stadium: BG Stadium, Thanyaburi, Pathum Thani, Thailand
- Thai League 1: 2nd
- FA Cup: Quarter-finals
- League Cup: Quarter-finals
- Champions Cup: Winners
- 2021 ACL: Round of 16
- 2022 ACL: Quarter-finals

The 2021–22 season is BG Pathum United's second consecutive season in Thai League 1, following promotion in 2019. BG Pathum enters the season as defending league champions, after winning the 2020–21 Thai League 1 title.

In addition to the domestic league, the club will also compete in this season's editions of the Thai FA Cup and the AFC Champions League.

== Squad ==
As of 25 June 2019.

Squad No.	Name	Nationality	Date of birth (age)	Previous club
Goalkeepers
1	Chatchai Budprom	(Thailand)	4 February 1987 (age 39)	(Thailand) Chiangrai United
25	Prasit Padungchok	(Thailand)	13 October 1982 (age 43)	(Thailand) Police Tero
26	Kittipong Phuthawchueak	(Thailand)	26 September 1989 (age 36)	(Thailand) Police Tero
31	Fahas Bilanglod	(Thailand)	3 March 1999 (age 27)	(Thailand) Chiangmai F.C.
32	Supanai Juntrapasit	(Thailand)		Youth Team
Defenders
5	Victor Cardozo	(Brazil)	19 December 1989 (age 36)	(Thailand) PTT Rayong
13	Ernesto Phumipha	(Thailand)	16 April 1990 (age 36)	(Thailand) Samut Prakan City F.C.
15	Apisit Sorada	(Thailand)	28 February 1997 (age 29)	(Thailand) Chiangmai F.C.
16	Jakkapan Praisuwan	(Thailand)	16 August 1994 (age 31)	(Thailand) Samut Prakan City F.C.
17	Irfan Fandi	(Singapore)	13 August 1997 (age 28)	(Singapore) Garena Young Lions
23	Santipharp Chan-ngom	(Thailand)	23 September 1996 (age 29)	(Thailand) Police Tero
30	Andrés Túñez	(Venezuela)	15 March 1987 (age 39)	(Thailand) Buriram United
33	Nakin Wisetchat	(Thailand)	9 July 1999 (age 27)	(Thailand) Bangkok United F.C.
34	Sarawut Koedsri	(Thailand)	29 April 1989 (age 37)	(Thailand) Rajpracha F.C.
Midfielders
3	Tossaphol Chomchon	(Thailand)	12 December 1989 (age 36)	(Thailand) Chiangmai F.C.
4	Chaowat Veerachat	(Thailand)	23 June 1996 (age 30)	(Japan) Cerezo Osaka U-23
6	Sarach Yooyen	(Thailand)	30 May 1992 (age 34)	(Thailand) Muangthong United
8	Peerapong Pichitchotirat	(Thailand)	28 June 1984 (age 42)	(Thailand) Rajpracha F.C.
11	Sumanya Purisai	(Thailand)	5 December 1986 (age 39)	(Thailand) Port F.C.
18	Pathompol Charoenrattanapirom	(Thailand)	21 April 1994 (age 32)	(Thailand) Police Tero F.C.
22	Worachit Kanitsribampen	(Thailand)	24 August 1997 (age 28)	(Thailand) Chonburi F.C.
24	Chatmongkol Thongkiri	(Thailand)	5 May 1997 (age 29)	(Thailand) Muangthong United
28	Nattaphon Worasut	(Thailand)	19 January 1997 (age 29)	(Thailand) Nakhon Ratchasima F.C.
48	Kanokpon Buspakom	(Thailand)	20 September 1999 (age 26)	(Thailand) Police Tero
Strikers
7	Diogo	(Brazil)	26 May 1987 (age 39)	(Malaysia) Johor Darul Ta'zim
9	Surachat Sareepim	(Thailand)	24 October 1986 (age 39)	(Thailand) Police United F.C.
10	Teerasil Dangda	(Thailand)	6 June 1988 (age 38)	(Japan) Shimizu S-Pulse
19	Chenrop Samphaodi	(Thailand)	2 June 1995 (age 31)	(Thailand) Port F.C.
20	Chitchanok Xaysensourinthone	(Thailand)	23 August 1994 (age 31)	(Thailand) Nakhon Ratchasima F.C.
29	Chatree Chimtalay	(Thailand)	14 December 1983 (age 42)	(Thailand) Bangkok F.C.
47	Thammayut Rakbun	(Thailand)	7 March 1997 (age 29)	(Thailand) Rajpracha F.C.
79	Thanadon Supaphon	(Thailand)	16 December 2000 (age 25)	Youth Team
99	Ikhsan Fandi	(Singapore)	9 April 1999 (age 27)	(Norway) FK Jerv
Players loaned out / left during season
8	Thitipan Puangchan	(Thailand)	1 September 1993 (age 32)	(Japan) Oita Trinita
11	Saharat Pongsuwan (D)	(Thailand)	11 June 1996 (age 30)	(Thailand) Chiangmai
13	Tawan Khotrsupho (F)	(Thailand)	23 January 2000 (age 26)	(Japan) Cerezo Osaka U-23
21	Rattanachat Neamtaisong (G)	(Thailand)	21 May 2001 (age 25)	Youth Team
26	Saharat Posri (M)	(Thailand)	11 April 1994 (age 32)	(Thailand) Khon Kaen F.C.
27	Kevin Ingreso (M)	(Philippines)	10 February 1993 (age 33)	(Thailand) Buriram United F.C.
35	Siroch Chatthong (F)	(Thailand)	8 December 1992 (age 33)	(Thailand) PT Prachuap F.C.
39	Yordrak Namuangrak (D)	(Thailand)	19 September 1989 (age 36)	(Thailand) Rayong F.C.
40	Korraphat Nareechan (G)	(Thailand)	7 October 1997 (age 28)	(Thailand) Chiangmai F.C.
63	Athibordee Atirat (D)	(Thailand)	28 February 1992 (age 34)	(Thailand) Chiangmai F.C.
88	Ryo Matsumura (M)	(Japan)	15 June 1994 (age 32)	(Thailand) Chiangmai F.C.
91	Tanin Kiatlerttham (D)	(Thailand)	23 August 2000 (age 25)	(Thailand) Rajpracha F.C.
92	Thammayut Tonkham (D)	(Thailand)	24 March 1997 (age 29)	(Thailand) Rajpracha F.C.
97	Phongrawit Jantawong (F)	(Thailand)	7 October 2000 (age 25)	(Japan) Cerezo Osaka U-23
	Thanakrit Laorkai (M)	(Thailand)	22 December 2003 (age 22)	Youth Team
	Somyot Pongsuwan (D)	(Thailand)	10 September 1993 (age 32)	(Thailand) Chiangmai F.C.
	Supasak Sarapee (D)	(Thailand)	5 April 2000 (age 26)	Youth Team
	Siwakorn Sangwong (M)	(Thailand)	6 February 1997 (age 29)	(Thailand) Chiangmai F.C.
	Sarawin Saengra (M)	(Thailand)	9 September 1997 (age 28)	(Thailand) Khon Kaen F.C.
33	Piyachanok Darit (D)	(Thailand)	5 November 1992 (age 33)	(Thailand) Rajpracha F.C.

== Transfer ==
=== In ===
Pre-Season

Position	Player	Transferred from	Ref
DF	(Thailand) Yordrak Namuangrak	(Thailand) Rayong F.C.	Undisclosed
DF	(Thailand) Ernesto Phumipha	(Thailand) Samut Prakan City F.C.	Undisclosed
DF	(Thailand) Jakkapan Praisuwan	(Thailand) Samut Prakan City F.C.	THB5m
MF	(Philippines) Kevin Ingreso	(Thailand) Buriram United F.C.	Free
MF	(Thailand) Sarawut Koedsri	(Thailand) Rajpracha F.C.	Free
MF	(Japan) Ryo Matsumura	(Thailand) Chiangmai F.C.	Free
MF	(Thailand) Chatmongkol Thongkiri	(Thailand) Port F.C.	Undisclosed
MF	(Thailand) Chitchanok Xaysensourinthone	(Thailand) Nakhon Ratchasima F.C.	Free
MF	(Thailand) Nattaphon Worasut	(Thailand) Nakhon Ratchasima F.C.	Free
MF	(Thailand) Peerapong Pichitchotirat	(Thailand) Rajpracha F.C.	Undisclosed
FW	(Brazil) Jardel Capistrano	(Thailand) Udon United F.C.	Free

Note 1: Jardel Capistrano was later moved out on loan.

Note 2: Peerapong Pichitchotirat move back to the squad after leaving initially.

Mid-Season

Position	Player	Transferred from	Ref
GK	(Thailand) Prasit Padungchok	(Thailand) Police Tero F.C.	Undisclosed
GK	(Thailand) Kittipong Phuthawchueak	(Thailand) Police Tero F.C.	Undisclosed
DF	(Thailand) Nakin Wisetchat	(Thailand) Bangkok United F.C.	Undisclosed
MF	(Thailand) Worachit Kanitsribampen	(Thailand) Chonburi F.C.	Undisclosed
FW	(Singapore) Ikhsan Fandi	(Norway) FK Jerv	US$50,000 / THB1.7m; 2.5 years contract
FW	(Thailand) Thammayut Rakbun	(Thailand) Rajpracha F.C.	Undisclosed

=== Out ===
Pre-Season

Position	Player	Transferred To	Ref
GK	(Thailand) Narit Taweekul	(Thailand) Khon Kaen F.C.	Free
DF	(Thailand) Eakkalak Lungnam	(Thailand)	Free
DF	(Philippines) Álvaro Silva	(Spain) Antequera CF (S5)	Free
DF	(Thailand) Pardsakorn Sripudpong	(Thailand) Chainat Hornbill F.C.	Free
DF	(Thailand) Chalermsak Aukkee	(Thailand) Police Tero F.C.	Free
MF	(Thailand) Peerapong Pichitchotirat	(Thailand) Rajpracha F.C.	Free
MF	(Japan) Yuki Bamba	(Thailand) Navy F.C.	Free
MF	(Spain) Toti	(Spain) CD Guijuelo (S4)	Free
MF	(Thailand) Saharat Posri	(Thailand) Chiangmai F.C.	Undisclosed
MF	(Japan) Mitsuru Maruoka	(South Korea) Gimpo FC	Free
MF	(Thailand) Nattachai Srisuwan	(Thailand) Nakhon Ratchasima F.C.	Free
FW	(Thailand) Samroeng Hanchiaw	(Thailand) Rajpracha F.C.	Free
FW	(Thailand) Nattawut Namthip	(Thailand) Rajpracha F.C.	Free
FW	(Thailand) Thammayut Rakbun	(Thailand) Rajpracha F.C.	Free
FW	(Brazil) Barros Tardeli	(South Korea) Suwon FC (K1)	Free

Note 1: Peerapong Pichitchotirat move back to the team after leaving in pre-season.

Note 2: Thammayut Rakbun returned to the club in the mid-season.

Note 3: Narit Taweekul move to Khon Kaen was made permanent.

=== Loan Out ===
Pre-Season

Position	Player	Transferred To	Ref
GK	(Thailand) Kiadtiphon Udom	(Thailand) Rajpracha F.C.	Season loan
GK	(Thailand) Rattanachat Neamtaisong	(Thailand) Rajpracha F.C.	Season loan
GK	(Thailand) Fahas Bilanglod	(Thailand) Chiangmai F.C.	Season loan
DF	(Thailand) Ronnayod Mingmitwan	(Thailand) Rajpracha F.C.	Season loan
DF	(Thailand) Chaiyapruek Chirachin	(Thailand) Chiangmai F.C.	Season loan
DF	(Thailand) Supasak Sarapee	(Thailand) Chiangmai F.C.	Season loan
DF	(Thailand) Somyot Pongsuwan	(Thailand) Chiangmai F.C.	Season loan
DF	(Thailand) Tanin Kiatlerttham	(Thailand) Rajpracha F.C.	Season loan
DF	(Thailand) Thammayut Tonkham	(Thailand) Rajpracha F.C.	Season loan
DF	(Thailand) Saharat Pongsuwan	(Thailand) PT Prachuap F.C.	Season loan
DF	(Thailand) Athibordee Atirat	(Thailand) Nongbua Pitchaya F.C.	Season loan
DF	(Thailand) Piyachanok Darit	(Thailand) Suphanburi F.C.	Season loan
DF	(Thailand) Suwannapat Kingkaew	(Thailand) Suphanburi F.C.	Season loan
MF	(Thailand) Siwakorn Sangwong	(Thailand) Rayong F.C.	Season loan
MF	(Thailand) Sarawin Saengra	(Thailand) Rajpracha F.C.	Season loan
MF	(Thailand) Thitipan Puangchan	(Thailand) Bangkok United F.C.	Loan until the end of 2021
FW	(Brazil) Jardel Capistrano	(Thailand) Rajpracha F.C.	Season loan
FW	(Thailand) Phongrawit Jantawong	(Thailand) Chiangmai F.C.	Season loan
FW	(Thailand) Tawan Khotrsupho	(Thailand) Chiangmai F.C.	Season loan

Mid-Season

Position	Player	Transferred To	Ref
GK	(Thailand) Korraphat Nareechan	(Thailand) Police Tero F.C.	Season loan
DF	(Thailand) Yordrak Namuangrak	(Thailand) Rajpracha F.C.	Season loan
DF	(Thailand) Athibordee Atirat	(Thailand) Rajpracha F.C.	Season loan
MF	(Thailand) Thanakrit Laorkai	(Thailand) Rajpracha F.C.	Season loan
MF	(Philippines) Kevin Ingreso	(Thailand) Samut Prakan City	Season loan
MF	(Japan) Ryo Matsumura	(Thailand) Police Tero F.C.	Season loan
FW	(Thailand) Siroch Chatthong	(Thailand) Chiangrai United	Season loan

=== Return from loan ===
Pre-Season

Position	Player	Transferred from	Ref
GK	(Thailand) Narit Taweekul	(Thailand) Khon Kaen F.C.	Loan return
GK	(Thailand) Korraphat Nareechan	(Thailand) Chiangmai F.C.	Loan return
GK	(Thailand) Rattanachart Niamthaisong	(Thailand) Chiangmai F.C.	Loan return
DF	(Thailand) Apisit Sorada	(Thailand) Chiangmai F.C.	Loan return
DF	(Thailand) Piyachanok Darit	(Thailand) Suphanburi F.C.	Loan return
DF	(Thailand) Chaiyapruek Chirachin	(Thailand) Rajpracha F.C.	Loan return
DF	(Thailand) Suwannapat Kingkaew	(Thailand) Rajpracha F.C.	Loan return
DF	(Thailand) Tanin Kiatlerttham	(Thailand) Rajpracha F.C.	Loan return
DF	(Thailand) Athibordee Atirat	(Thailand) Chiangmai F.C.	Loan return
DF	(Thailand) Pardsakorn Sripudpong	(Thailand) Kasetsart F.C.	Loan return
DF	(Thailand) Thammayut Tonkham	(Thailand) Rajpracha F.C.	Loan return
DF	(Thailand) Chalermsak Aukkee	(Thailand) Chiangmai F.C.	Loan return
DF	(Thailand) Tanin Kiatlerttham	(Thailand) Chiangmai F.C.	Loan return
DF	(Thailand) Eakkalak Lungnam	(Thailand) Chiangmai F.C.	Loan return
DF	(Thailand) Ronnayod Mingmitwan	(Thailand) Khon Kaen F.C.	Loan return
MF	(Thailand) Siwakorn Sangwong	(Thailand) Chiangmai F.C.	Loan return
MF	(Thailand) Nattachai Srisuwan	(Thailand) Chiangmai F.C.	Loan return
MF	(Spain) Toti	(Thailand) Samut Prakan City F.C.	Loan return
MF	(Japan) Yuki Bamba	(Thailand) Chiangmai F.C.	Loan return
FW	(Brazil) Barros Tardeli	(Thailand) Samut Prakan City F.C.	Loan return
FW	(Thailand) Samroeng Hanchiaw	(Thailand) Chiangmai F.C.	Loan return
FW	(Thailand) Nattawut Namthip	(Thailand) Chiangmai F.C.	Loan return
DF	(Thailand) Athibordee Atirat	(Thailand) Nongbua Pitchaya F.C.	Loan return

Note 1: Barros Tardeli moved to Suwon FC in Korea after returning from loan.

Note 2: Toti moved to CD Guijuelo in Spain after returning from loan.

Note 3: Yuki Bamba moved to Navy FC after returning from loan.

Note 4: Nattachai Srisuwan (permanent), Samroeng Hanchiaw and Nattawut Namthip moved to Rajpracha FC after returning from loan.

Note 5: Chalermsak Aukkee moved to Police FC after returning from loan.

Note 6: Piyachanok Darit moved back to Suphanburi on loan after completing the AFC Champions League group matches.

Note 7: Suwannapat Kingkaew moved back to Suphanburi on loan after returning from loan from Rajpracha FC.

Note 8: Tanin Kiatlerttham and Thammayut Tonkham were loaned back to Rajpracha FC for another season.

Note 9: Pardsakorn Sripudpong moved to Chainat Hornbill F.C. after returning from loan.

Note 10: Eakkalak Lungnam was released in 1 July 2021.

Note 11: Athibordee Atirat's loan to Nongbua Pitchaya was recalled, then he was loaned again to Raj Pracha for the rest of the season .

Mid-Season

Position	Player	Transferred from	Ref
GK	(Thailand) Fahas Bilanglod	(Thailand) Chiangmai F.C.	Loan Return

=== Extension / Retained ===
Position	Player	Ref

== Friendlies ==
=== Pre-Season Friendly ===
Win Draw Loss

=== Mid-Season Friendly ===
Win Draw Loss

== Competitions ==
=== Champions Cup ===
==== Matches ====
Win Draw Loss

1 September 2021 Final	BG Pathum United	1–0	Chiangrai United	Mae Rim, Chiang Mai
18:00 UTC+7	Ryo Matsumura 87'; Ernesto Amantegui Phumipha (yellow card) 31'; Irfan Fandi (yellow card) 57'; Chaowat Veerachat (yellow card) 85'; Pathompol Charoenrattanapirom (yellow card) 90+1'; Diogo Luís Santo (yellow card) 90+4'		Suriya Singmui (yellow card) 15'; Bill (yellow card) 45+3'; Brinner (red card) 18'	Stadium: 700th Anniversary of Chiang Mai Stadium; Attendance: 0 Referee: Wiwat Jampa-on

=== Thai League 1 ===
==== League table ====
Pos	Team	Pld	W	D	L	GF	GA	GD	Pts	Qualification
1	Buriram United (C, Q)	30	19	5	6	48	19	+29	62	Qualification for 2023–24 AFC Champions League group stage
2	BG Pathum United (Q)	30	17	9	4	52	27	+25	60	Qualification for 2023–24 AFC Champions League qualifying play-offs
3	Bangkok United	30	15	8	7	53	30	+23	53	
4	Muangthong United	30	13	10	7	46	35	+11	49	
5	Chiangrai United	30	13	8	9	33	35	−2	47	

Updated to match(es) played on 4 May 2022. Source: Thai League
Rules for classification: 1) Points; 2) Head-to-head points; 3) Head-to-head goals difference; 4) Head-to-head goals scored; 5) Overall goals difference; 6) Overall goals scored; 7) Fair play points; 8) Play-off without extra time;).
(C) Champions; (Q) Qualified for the phase indicated

==== Matches ====
Win Draw Loss

5 September 2021 1	Chonburi	1–1	BG Pathum United	Chonburi Province
18:00 UTC+7	Dennis Murillo 68' (pen.); Noppanon Kachaplayuk (yellow card) 29'; Songchai Thongcham (yellow card) 81'		Diogo 17' (yellow card) 70'; Chatmongkol Thongkiri (yellow card) 25'; Ernesto Amantegui (yellow card) 67'; Yordrak Namuangrak (red card) 69'	Stadium: Chonburi Stadium; Attendance: 0 Referee: Winat Phophat

10 September 2021 2	BG Pathum United	2–0	Ratchaburi Mitr Phol	Pathum Thani Province
18:00 UTC+7	Chenrop Samphaodi 48'; Teerasil Dangda 54'		Steeven Langil (yellow card) 38'; Narakorn Noomchansakul (yellow card) 45+3'; Pravinwat Boonyong (yellow card) 89'	Stadium: Leo Stadium; Attendance: 0 Referee: Niwat Insa-ard

13 October 2021 3 (Rescheduled)	BG Pathum United	2–1	Muangthong United	Pathum Thani Province
	Jakkapan Praisuwan 27'; Teerasil Dangda 43'; Andrés Túñez (yellow card) 57'; Kevin Ingreso (yellow card) 90+4'		Purachet Thodsanit 84'	Stadium: Leo Stadium; Attendance: 0 Referee: Natee Choosuwan

17 November 2021 4 (Rescheduled)	Nongbua Pitchaya	3–1	BG Pathum United	Nong Bua Lamphu
	Lursan Thiamrat 48'; Irfan Fandi 62' (o.g.); Airton 90+2'; Sathaporn Daengsee (yellow card) 85'		Chaowat Veerachart 15'; Andrés Túñez (yellow card) 69'; Ryo Matsumura (yellow card) 83'	Stadium: Pitchaya Stadium; Attendance: 1,772; Referee: Kotchapoom Meesridaecha

2 October 2021 5	BG Pathum United	2–1	Khonkaen United	Pathum Thani Province
18:00 UTC+7	Chenrop Samphaodi 4'; Pathompol Charoenrattanapirom 31'; Irfan Fandi (yellow card) 12'; Chatchai Budprom (red card) 62'		Ibson Melo 65' (pen.); Phalakon Wokiang (yellow card) 90'	Stadium: Leo Stadium; Attendance: 0 Referee: Sarayut Jakngoen

5 October 2021 6	BG Pathum United	0–2	Chiangrai United	Pathum Thani Province
18:00 UTC+7	Sarawut Koedsri (yellow card) 32'		Felipe Amorim 28'; Phitiwat Sukjitthammakul 45+2'; Gionata Verzura (yellow card) 43'	Stadium: Leo Stadium; Attendance: 0 Referee: Niwat Insa-ard

9 October 2021 7	BG Pathum United	0–3	Police Tero	Pathum Thani Province
18:00 UTC+7	Chenrop Samphaodi (yellow card) 7'; Pathompol Charoenrattanapirom (yellow card) 25'		Wanchai Jarunongkran 14'; Jenphob Phokhi 51'; Nattaphol Sukchai 88'; Chalermsak Aukkee (yellow card) 50'; Teeratep Winothai (yellow card) 71'; Prasit Padungchok (yellow card) 83'	Stadium: Leo Stadium; Attendance: 0 Referee: Noppadet Mangngam

16 October 2021 8	Suphanburi	0–2	BG Pathum United	Suphan Buri Province
	Ratchanat Arunyapairot (yellow card) 71'		Pathompol Charoenrattanapirom 47'; Chaowat Veerachart 62'; Apisit Sorada (yellow card) 32'; Teerasil Dangda (yellow card) 58'	Stadium: Suphan Buri Provincial Stadium; Attendance: 1,106; Referee: Mongkolchai Pechsri

23 October 2021 9	BG Pathum United	1–0	Bangkok United	Pathum Thani Province
	Teerasil Dangda 55' (pen.); Santipharp Chan-ngom (yellow card) 11'; Chaowat Veerachart (yellow card) 27'; Andrés Túñez (yellow card) 42'; Sarach Yooyen (yellow card) 63'; Jakkapan Praisuwan (yellow card) 71'; Kevin Ingreso (yellow card) 90+3'		Vander Luiz (yellow card) 25'; Mika Chunuonsee (yellow card) 53'	Stadium: Leo Stadium; Attendance: 1,678; Referee: Chaireag Ngamsom

30 October 2021 10	Chiangmai United	1–3	BG Pathum United	Chiang Mai Province
	Kabfah Boonmatoon 80'; Surawich Logarwit (yellow card) 64'; Atit Daosawang (yellow card) 90'		Andrés Túñez 8'; Teerasil Dangda 27' 57'; Chaowat Veerachart (yellow card) 24'; Apisit Sorada (yellow card) 45'; Victor (yellow card) 53'	Stadium: 700th Anniversary Stadium; Attendance: 1,332; Referee: Winat Phophat

6 November 2021 11	BG Pathum United	1–0	Buriram United	Pathum Thani Province
	Andrés Túñez 25'; Chatmongkol Thongkiri (yellow card) 5'; Apisit Sorada (yellow card) 27'; Santiphap Channgom (yellow card) 40'; Chatchai Budprom (yellow card) 75'		Rebin Sulaka (yellow card) 29'; Supachok Sarachat (yellow card) 49'; Supachai Chaided (yellow card) 52'; Chitipat Tanklang (yellow card) 61'; Piyaphon Phanichakul (yellow card) 73'	Stadium: Leo Stadium; Attendance: 1,823; Referee: Warintorn Sassadee

9 November 2021 12	Nakhon Ratchasima	0–0	BG Pathum United	Nakhon Ratchasima
	Dennis Villanueva (yellow card) 32'		Sarach Yooyen (yellow card) 38'; Victor (yellow card) 55'; Chatmongkol Thongkiri (yellow card) 65'	Stadium: 80th Birthday Stadium; Attendance: 2,876; Referee: Sahapop Sriboonlue

13 November 2021 13	BG Pathum United	1–0	Samut Prakan City	Pathum Thani Province
	Victor Cardozo 42' (pen.)		Phatsaphon Choedvichit (yellow card) 22'	Stadium: Leo Stadium; Attendance: 2,349; Referee: Songkran Bunmeekiart

20 November 2021 14	Port	1–0	BG Pathum United	Bangkok
	Victor Cardozo 27' (o.g.); Sansern Limwattana (yellow card) 35'			Stadium: PAT Stadium; Attendance: 1,207; Referee: Sivakorn Pu-udom

27 November 2021 15	PT Prachuap	0–0	BG Pathum United	Prachuap Khiri Khan
			Andrés Túñez (yellow card) 45+2'; Irfan Fandi (yellow card) 64'; Santiphap Channgom (yellow card) 75'	Stadium: Sam Ao Stadium

8 January 2022 16	Ratchaburi Mitr Phol	1–1	BG Pathum United	Ratchaburi Province
	Sittichok Kannoo 74'		Diogo Luís Santo 7' (yellow card) 78'; Santiphap Channgom (yellow card) 9'; Sarawut Koedsri (yellow card) 43'; Chaowat Veerachart (yellow card) 86'	Stadium: Mitr Phol Stadium

14 January 2022 17	Muangthong United	2–2	BG Pathum United	Nonthaburi Province
	Willian Popp 14'; Boontawee Theppawong 74'; Lucas Rocha (yellow card) 17'		Diogo 47'; Ikhsan Fandi 55'; Andrés Túñez (yellow card) 21'	Stadium: Thunderdome Stadium; Attendance: 5,237; Referee: Songkran Bunmeekiart

22 January 2022 18	BG Pathum United	1–1	Nongbua Pitchaya	Pathum Thani Province
	Andrés Túñez 58' (yellow card) 90+3'		Barros Tardeli 85' (yellow card) 81'; Hamilton (yellow card) 80'	Stadium: BG Stadium; Attendance: 3,321; Referee: Torphong Somsing

5 February 2022 19	Khonkaen United	2–2	BG Pathum United	Khon Kaen Province
	Woranat Thongkruea 14'; Ibson Melo 43'; Kitphom Bunsan (yellow card) 64'; Romulo (yellow card) 68'		Ikhsan Fandi 19' (yellow card) 90+2'; Diogo Luís Santo 63' (pen.); Apisit Sorada (yellow card) 45'; Teerasil Dangda (yellow card) 68'	Stadium: Khonkaen Stadium

11 February 2022 20	Chiangrai United	1–2	BG Pathum United	Chiang Rai
	Kohei Kato 54'; Getterson (penalty missed) 32; Sarawut Inpaen (yellow card) 57'		Brunner 12'; Diogo Luís Santo 88' (pen.); Pathompol Charoenrattanapirom (yellow card) 15'; Ernesto Amantegui Phumipha (yellow card) 45'; Ikhsan Fandi (yellow card) 45+3'	Stadium: Leo Chiangrai Stadium

19 February 2022 21	Police Tero	1–1	BG Pathum United	Bangkok
	Chalermsak Aukkee 90+1' (yellow card) 53'; Chumpol Bua-ngam (yellow card) 70' (yellow-red card) 81'; Evandro Paulista (yellow card) 85'		Chatree Chimtalay 83'; Diogo Luís Santo (yellow card) 17'; Sarach Yooyen (yellow card) 63'; Chatmongkol Thongkiri (yellow card) 73'; Apisit Sorada (yellow card) 87'; Victor (yellow card) 90'	Stadium: Boonyachinda Stadium

26 February 2022 22	BG Pathum United	2–0	Suphanburi	Pathum Thani Province
	Diogo 17' 90+6' (pen.)			Stadium: BG Stadium

4 March 2022 23	Bangkok United	1–1	BG Pathum United	Pathum Thani
	Chananan Pombuppha 17'		Sumanya Purisai 51'; Diogo (red card) 45+1'; Sarach Yooyen (yellow card) 71'	Stadium: Thammasat Stadium

29 January 2022 24 (Rescheduled)	BG Pathum United	4–1	Chiangmai United	Pathum Thani Province
	Ikhsan Fandi 15'; Pathompol Charoenrattanapirom 30'; Diogo Luís Santo 45'; Sarach Yooyen 90+3'; Andrés Túñez (yellow card) 79'; Santiphap Channgom (yellow card) 82'		Bill 35'	Stadium: BG Stadium

20 March 2022 25	Buriram United	0–1	BG Pathum United	Buriram
			Sarach Yooyen 13'	Stadium: Chang Arena

10 April 2022 26 (Rescheduled)	BG Pathum United	3–0	Nakhon Ratchasima	Pathum Thani Province
	Teerasil Dangda 65' 79'; Worachit Kanitsribampen 73'			Stadium: BG Stadium

23 February 2022 27 (Rescheduled)	Samut Prakan City	0–3	BG Pathum United	Bang Phli, Samut Prakan
			Chenrop Samphaodi 42'; Ikhsan Fandi 81'; Chaowat Veerachart 90+3'	Stadium: Samut Prakan SAT Stadium

2 April 2022 28	BG Pathum United	2–1	Port	Pathum Thani Province
	Irfan Fandi 26'; Kanarin Thawornsak 28' (o.g.)		David Rochela 54'	Stadium: BG Stadium

6 April 2022 29	BG Pathum United	7–2	PT Prachuap	Pathum Thani Province
	Ikhsan Fandi 19' 26' 29' 31'; Worachit Kanitsribampen 31'; Teerasil Dangda 71'; Diogo Luís Santo 90+5' (pen.)		Willen 12' (pen.) 63' (pen.)	Stadium: Leo Stadium

7 May 2022 30 (Rescheduled)	BG Pathum United	4–1	Chonburi	Pathum Thani Province
	Junior Eldstal 44' (o.g.); Peerapong Pichitchotirat 66'; Victor Cardozo 73' (pen.); Diogo Luís Santo 88'		Gidi Kanyuk 51'	Stadium: Leo Stadium

=== Thai FA Cup ===
==== Matches ====
Win Draw Loss

27 October 2021 First round	Udon United (T3)	0–2	BG Pathum United	Udon Thani Province
			Sumanya Purisai 2' 62'	Stadium: Institute of Physical Education Udon Thani Stadium

24 November 2021 Second round	Muang Loei United (T3)	0–2	BG Pathum United	Loei Province
			Chatree Chimtalay 20' 30'	Stadium: Blue Dragon Muang Loei Stadium

2 February 2022 Third round (Rescheduled)	BG Pathum United	2–0	Port (T1)	Pathum Thani Province
	Ikhsan Fandi 26'; Teerasil Dangda 80'			Stadium: BG Stadium

16 February 2022 Quarter-finals	Police Tero (T1)	1–0 (a.e.t.)	BG Pathum United	Bangkok
	Evandro Paulista 108'; Sanchai Nontasila (yellow card) 65'; Wanchai Jarunongkran (yellow card) 81'; Lesley Adjei Ablorh (yellow card) 90'; Yodsak Chaowana (yellow card) 112'; Sinthaweechai Hathairattanakool (yellow card) 120+2'		Andrés Túñez (yellow card) 52' (yellow-red card) 59'; Irfan Fandi (yellow card) 71'; Andrés Túñez (yellow card) 76'; Sanchai Nontasila (yellow card) 65'; Teerasil Dangda (yellow card) 103'; Sumanya Purisai (red card) 119'	Stadium: Boonyachinda Stadium

=== Thai League Cup ===
==== Matches ====
Win Draw Loss

12 January 2022 First round	Songkhla (T3)	1–4	BG Pathum United	Songkhla
	Natan Oliveira 32'		Ikhsan Fandi 11' 85'; Worachit Kanitsribampen 56'; Chaowat Veerachart 65'	Stadium: Tinsulanon Stadium

9 February 2022 Second round	Krabi (T3)	0–5	BG Pathum United	Krabi
			Nattapon Worasut 45' 51'; Diogo 79' 90+3'; Sumanya Purisai 81'	Stadium: Krabi Provincial Stadium

13 March 2022 Quarter-finals	Chiangrai United (T1)	4–2	BG Pathum United	Chiang Rai
	Felipe Amorim 19' 72'; Getterson 51' 55'		Ikhsan Fandi 35' 69'	Stadium: Leo Chiangrai Stadium

=== 2021 AFC Champions League ===
==== Group stage ====
Pos	Team	Pld	W	D	L	GF	GA	GD	Pts	Qualification	ULS	PAT	VIE	KAY
1	(South Korea) Ulsan Hyundai	6	6	0	0	13	1	+12	18	Advance to Round of 16	—	2–0	3–0	2–1
2	(Thailand) BG Pathum United (H)	6	4	0	2	10	6	+4	12	Advance to Round of 16	0–2	—	2–0	4–1
3	(Vietnam) Viettel	6	2	0	4	7	9	−2	6		0–1	1–3	—	1–0
4	(Philippines) Kaya–Iloilo	6	0	0	6	2	16	−14	0		0–3	0–1	0–5	—

Source: AFC
Rules for classification: Tiebreakers
(H) Hosts

26 June 2021 Matchday 1	BG Pathum United (Thailand)	4–1	(Philippines) Kaya FC	Pathum Thani, Thailand
17:00 UTC+7	Teerasil Dangda 23', 59'; Diogo Luís Santo 35', 51'; Thitiphan Puangchan (yellow card) 57'	Report	Marwin Angeles 81'; Simone Rota (red card) 49'	Stadium: Pathum Thani Stadium; Attendance: 0 Referee: Ryuji Sato (Japan); Man of the Match: (Brazil) Diogo Luís Santo

29 June 2021 Matchday 2	Ulsan Hyundai (South Korea)	2–0	(Thailand) BG Pathum United	Pathum Thani, Thailand
17:00 UTC+7	Kim Min-jun 24'; Lukas Hinterseer 45+2'; Valeri Qazaishvili (yellow card) 80'; Shin Hyung-Min (yellow card) 90+3'	Report	Diogo Luís Santo (yellow card) 90+1'	Stadium: Pathum Thani Stadium; Attendance: 0 Referee: Saoud Al-Athbah (Qatar); Man of the Match: (South Korea) Kim Tae-hwan

2 July 2021 Matchday 3	BG Pathum United (Thailand)	2–0	(Vietnam) Viettel FC	Pathum Thani, Thailand
21:00 UTC+7	Thitiphan Puangchan 13' (yellow card) 48'; Chaowat Veerachat 84'; Andrés Túñez (yellow card) 18'; Yordrak Namuangrak (yellow card) 37'	Report	Nguyễn Trọng Đại (yellow card) 14'; Jahongir Abdumominov (yellow card) 27'; Quế Ngọc Hải (yellow card) 39'; Caíque (yellow card) 78'	Stadium: Pathum Thani Stadium; Attendance: 0 Referee: Hanna Hattab (Syria); Man of the Match: (Brazil) Victor Cardozo

5 July 2021 Matchday 4	Viettel FC (Vietnam)	1–3	(Thailand) BG Pathum United	Pathum Thani, Thailand
21:00 UTC+7	Pedro Paulo 23' (yellow card) 59'; Quế Ngọc Hải (yellow card) 40'	Report	Chaowat Veerachat 56'; Andrés Túñez 62'; Diogo Luís Santo 64'; Ernesto Amantegui Phumipha (yellow card) 48'; Kevin Ingreso (yellow card) 82'; Saharat Posri (yellow card) 90'	Stadium: Pathum Thani Stadium; Attendance: 0 Referee: Ryuji Sato (Japan); Man of the Match: (Brazil) Diogo Luís Santo

8 July 2021 Matchday 5	Kaya FC (Philippines)	0–1	(Thailand) BG Pathum United	Pathum Thani, Thailand
17:00 UTC+7	Jovin Bedic (yellow card) 45+2'; Masanari Omura (yellow card) 90+1'	Report	Sarach Yooyen 83'; Andrés Túñez (yellow card) 88'	Stadium: Pathum Thani Stadium; Referee: Ammar Mahfoodh (Bahrain); Man of the Match: (Thailand) Sarach Yooyen

11 July 2021 Matchday 6	BG Pathum United (Thailand)	0–2	(South Korea) Ulsan Hyundai	Pathum Thani, Thailand
21:00 UTC+7	Chatmongkol Thongkiri (yellow card) 84'	Report	Kim Min-jun 31' (yellow card) 33'; Qazaishvili 87'; Kim Tae-hwan (yellow card) 14'; Dave Bulthuis (yellow card) 28'	Stadium: Pathum Thani Stadium; Attendance: 0 Referee: Alireza Faghani (Iran); Man of the Match: (Georgia (country)) Valeri Qazaishvili

==== Knockout stage ====
Round of 16

15 September 2021 Round of 16	Jeonbuk Hyundai Motors (South Korea)	1–1 (a.e.t.) (4–2 p)	(Thailand) BG Pathum United	Jeonju, South Korea
17:30 UTC+9	Gustavo 45+2'; Paik Seung-ho (yellow card) 89'	Live Report; Stats Report	Teerasil Dangda 76'; Sarach Yooyen (yellow card) 41'; Chitchanok Xaysensourinthone (yellow card) 99'	Stadium: Jeonju World Cup Stadium; Referee: Mooud Bonyadifar (Iran)
	Penalties
	Jakkapan Praisuwan (penalty scored); Chatmongkol Thongkiri (penalty scored); Sarach Yooyen (penalty missed); Chitchanok Xaysensourinthone (penalty missed)		Gustavo (penalty scored); Kim Bo-kyung (penalty scored); Stanislav Iljutcenko (penalty scored); Kim Jin-su (penalty scored)

=== 2022 AFC Champions League ===
==== Group stage ====
Pos	Team	Pld	W	D	L	GF	GA	GD	Pts	Qualification	BGP	MCY	JND	UCT
1	(Thailand) BG Pathum United (H)	6	3	3	0	11	2	+9	12	Advance to Round of 16	—	1–1	0–0	5–0
2	(Australia) Melbourne City	6	3	3	0	10	3	+7	12		0–0	—	2–1	3–0
3	(South Korea) Jeonnam Dragons	6	2	2	2	5	5	0	8		0–2	1–1	—	2–0
4	(Philippines) United City	6	0	0	6	1	17	−16	0		1–3	0–3	0–1	—

Source: AFC
Rules for classification: Tiebreakers
(H) Hosts

16 April 2022 Matchday 1	BG Pathum United (Thailand)	1–1	(Australia) Melbourne City	Pathum Thani, Thailand
18:00 UTC+7	Teerasil Dangda 35'	Report	Andrew Nabbout 22'; Marco Tilio (yellow card) 55'; Jordan Bos (yellow card) 75'	Stadium: Pathum Thani Stadium; Attendance: 3,189; Referee: Mooud Bonyadifar (Iran); Man of the Match: (Thailand) Pathompol Charoenrattanapirom

19 April 2022 Matchday 2	Jeonnam Dragons (South Korea)	0–2	(Thailand) BG Pathum United	Pathum Thani, Thailand
18:00 UTC+7	Lee Kyu-hyuk (yellow card) 45+2'; Jang Soon-hyeok (yellow card) 90+4'	Report	Pathompol Charoenrattanapirom 51'; Jakkapan Praisuwan 72'; Chatmongkol Thongkiri (yellow card) 59'; Kanokpon Buspakom (yellow card) 90+4'; Chenrop Samphaodi (yellow card) 90+4'	Stadium: Pathum Thani Stadium; Attendance: 2,671; Referee: Qasim Al-Hatmi (Oman; Man of the Match: (Thailand) Sarach Yooyen

22 April 2022 Matchday 3	BG Pathum United (Thailand)	5–0	(Philippines) United City	Pathum Thani, Thailand
18:00 UTC+7	Kanokpon Buspakom 42'; Worachit Kanitsribampen 75'; Diogo 80'; Alan Robertson 82' (o.g.); Pathompol Charoenrattanapirom 87'; Jakkapan Praisuwan (yellow card) 90+2'	Report		Stadium: Pathum Thani Stadium; Attendance: 2,752; Referee: Saoud Al Athbah (Qatar); Man of the Match: (Brazil) Diogo Luís Santo

25 April 2022 Matchday 4	United City (Philippines)	1–3	(Thailand) BG Pathum United	Pathum Thani, Thailand
21:00 UTC+7	Mark Hartmann 79'; Kenshiro Daniels (yellow card) 9'	Report	Diogo 17'; Ikhsan Fandi 29', 39'; Peerapong Pichitchotirat (yellow card) 61'; Andrés Túñez (yellow card) 78'	Stadium: Pathum Thani Stadium; Attendance: 2,227; Referee: Zaid Thamer (Iraq); Man of the Match: (Singapore) Ikhsan Fandi

28 April 2022 Matchday 5	Melbourne City (Australia)	0–0	(Thailand) BG Pathum United	Pathum Thani, Thailand
18:00 UTC+7	Taras Gomulka (yellow card) 36'; Rostyn Griffiths (yellow card) 85'; Scott Jamieson (yellow card) 90+1'	Report	Pathompol Charoenrattanapirom (yellow card) 21'; Worachit Kanitsribampen (yellow card) 85'	Stadium: Pathum Thani Stadium; Attendance: 3,699; Referee: Ammar Al-Jeneibi (United Arab Emirates); Man of the Match: (Thailand) Sarach Yooyen

1 May 2022 Matchday 6	BG Pathum United (Thailand)	0–0	(South Korea) Jeonnam Dragons	Pathum Thani, Thailand
18:00 UTC+7	Irfan Fandi (yellow card) 19'; Teerasil Dangda (yellow card) 45+1'; Chaowat Veerachat (yellow card) 90+2'	Report	Lee Hoo-kwon (yellow card) 47'; Jang Soon-hyeok (yellow card) 71'	Stadium: Pathum Thani Stadium; Attendance: 4,581; Referee: Mooud Bonyadifar (Iran); Man of the Match: (Thailand) Kittipong Phuthawchueak

==== Knockout stage ====
Round of 16

18 August 2022 Round of 16	BG Pathum United (Thailand)	4–0	(Hong Kong) Kitchee SC	Saitama, Japan
17:00 UTC+9	Worachit Kanitsribampen 34'; Ikhsan Fandi 39'; Teerasil Dangda 69'; Chatmongkol Thongkiri 87'; Santiphap Channgom (yellow card) 45+1'; Irfan Fandi (yellow card) 75'	Report	Cleiton (yellow card) 9'	Stadium: Urawa Komaba Stadium; Attendance: 258; Referee: Adham Makhadmeh (Jordan); Man of the Match: (Thailand) Phitiwat Sukjitthammakul

Quarter-finals

22 August 2022 Quarter-finals	Urawa Red Diamonds (Japan)	4–0	(Thailand) BG Pathum United	Saitama, Japan
20:00 UTC+9	Karlsson 32'; Iwanami 42'; Koizumi 65'; Akimoto 72'	Report		Stadium: Saitama Stadium 2002; Attendance: 16,210; Referee: Mohammed Al-Hoish (Saudi Arabia)

== Team statistics ==
=== Appearances and goals ===
As of 5 May 2022

No.	Pos.	Player	League 1		FA Cup		League Cup		Thailand Champions Cup		AFC Champions League		Total	
No.	Pos.	Player	Apps.	Goals	Apps.	Goals	Apps.	Goals	Apps.	Goals	Apps.	Goals	Apps.	Goals
1	GK	(Thailand) Chatchai Budprom	13	0	2	0	0	0	1	0	7	0	23	0
3	MF	(Thailand) Tossaphol Chomchon	1	0	1	0	0	0	0	0	0+1	0	3	0
4	MF	(Thailand) Chaowat Veerachat	27+3	3	1+2	0	1+1	1	0+1	0	5+5	2	46	6
5	DF	(Brazil) Victor Cardozo	14+5	2	1	0	1	0	1	0	6+1	0	29	2
6	MF	(Thailand) Sarach Yooyen	25+1	2	2+1	0	2	0	1	0	12+1	1	45	3
7	FW	(Brazil) Diogo Luís Santo	11+3	10	0+1	0	1+1	2	1	0	7+4	5	29	17
8	MF	(Thailand) Peerapong Pichitchotirat	2+4	1	2	0	0+2	0	0	0	1	0	11	1
9	FW	(Thailand) Surachat Sareepim	3+11	0	1	0	0	0	0+1	0	3+5	0	24	0
10	FW	(Thailand) Teerasil Dangda	14+6	8	0+3	1	0+1	0	1	0	9+3	4	37	13
11	MF	(Thailand) Sumanya Purisai	9+7	1	2+1	2	1+1	1	1	0	2+6	0	32	4
13	DF	(Thailand) Ernesto Phumipha	5+7	0	3	0	0+1	0	1	0	5+3	0	25	0
15	DF	(Thailand) Apisit Sorada	19+6	0	2	0	3	0	0	0	4+4	0	38	0
16	DF	(Thailand) Jakkapan Praisuwan	18+4	1	1+1	0	3	0	0	0	5+1	1	32	2
17	DF	(Singapore) Irfan Fandi	24+1	1	2+1	0	0	0	1	0	5	0	34	1
18	MF	(Thailand) Pathompol Charoenrattanapirom	20+3	3	1+1	0	3	0	0+1	0	8+4	2	41	5
19	FW	(Thailand) Chenrop Samphaodi	6+9	3	2+1	0	1	0	0	0	3+5	0	27	3
20	DF	(Thailand) Chitchanok Xaysensourinthone	0+2	0	0	0	0	0	0	0	0+1	0	3	0
21	GK	(Thailand) Rattanachat Neamtaisong	0	0	0	0	0	0	0	0	0	0	0	0
22	MF	(Thailand) Worachit Kanitsribampen	11+3	2	2	0	3	1	0	0	5+1	1	25	4
23	DF	(Thailand) Santipharp Chan-ngom	22+4	0	3	0	3	0	1	0	8	0	41	0
24	MF	(Thailand) Chatmongkol Thongkiri	11+11	0	1+1	0	1	0	0	0	4+3	0	32	0
25	GK	(Thailand) Prasit Padungchok	7	0	1	0	1	0	0	0	0	0	9	0
26	GK	(Thailand) Kittipong Phuthawchueak	8	0	1	0	2	0	0	0	6	0	17	0
28	MF	(Thailand) Nattaphon Worasut	2+8	0	3	0	2	2	0	0	0+1	0	16	2
29	FW	(Thailand) Chatree Chimtalay	4+6	1	2	2	0	0	0+1	0	3+1	0	17	3
30	DF	(Venezuela) Andrés Túñez	20	3	2+1	0	2+1	0	0	0	10	1	36	4
31	GK	(Thailand) Fahas Bilanglod	0	0	0	0	0	0	0	0	0	0	0	0
33	DF	(Thailand) Nakin Wisetchat	1+3	0	0+1	0	0+1	0	0	0	1+1	0	7	0
34	DF	(Thailand) Sarawut Koedsri	6+2	0	2	0	0+1	0	0	0	1+2	0	14	0
48	MF	(Thailand) Kanokpon Buspakom	0	0	0	0	0	0	0	0	1+2	1	3	0
99	FW	(Singapore) Ikhsan Fandi	10+4	8	2	1	2	4	0	0	5	2	23	15
Players who have played this season and/or sign for the season but had left the club or on loan to other club
8	MF	(Thailand) Thitipan Puangchan	0	0	0	0	0	0	0	0	5	1	5	1
26	MF	(Thailand) Saharat Posri	0	0	0	0	0	0	0	0	0+2	0	2	0
27	MF	(Philippines) Kevin Ingreso	3+7	0	2	0	0	0	1	0	3+4	0	20	0
33	DF	(Thailand) Piyachanok Darit	0	0	0	0	0	0	0	0	4	0	4	0
35	FW	(Thailand) Siroch Chatthong	3+6	0	0+1	0	0	0	0	0	0+3	0	13	0
39	DF	(Thailand) Yordrak Namuangrak	4+2	0	0+1	0	0	0	1	0	5	0	13	0
40	GK	(Thailand) Korraphat Nareechan	2+1	0	0	0	0	0	0	0	0	0	3	0
63	DF	(Thailand) Athibordee Atirat	0	0	0	0	0	0	0	0	0	0	0	0
88	MF	(Japan) Ryo Matsumura	2+4	0	0	0	0	0	0+1	1	0	0	7	1
