= Chatmongkol Thongkiri =

Thai footballer (born 1997)

Personal information
- Full name: Chatmongkol Thongkiri
- Date of birth: 5 May 1997 (age 29)
- Place of birth: Songkhla, Thailand
- Height: 1.75 m (5 ft 9 in)
- Position: Defensive midfielder

Team information
- Current team: BG Pathum United
- Number: 4

Youth career
- 2015: Songkhla United

Senior career*
Years	Team	Apps	(Gls)
2016	Phuket	12	(0)
2017–2018	Bangkok Glass	0	(0)
2018	→ Chiangmai (loan)	14	(0)
2019	Chainat Hornbill	25	(0)
2020–2021	Port	1	(0)
2020–2021	→ Muangthong United (loan)	24	(0)
2021–2026	BG Pathum United	52	(0)
2024	→ PT Prachuap (loan)	9	(0)
2024–2025	→ PT Prachuap (loan)	21	(0)

International career
2018–2019	Thailand U23	4	(0)
- * Club domestic league appearances and goals as of 9 January 2026

Chatmongkol Thongkiri (Thai: ฉัตรมงคล ทองคีรี, born May 5, 1997) is a Thai professional footballer who plays as a defensive midfielder for Thai League 1 club BG Pathum United.

== Club ==
As of 28 May 2020

Club	Season	League			FA Cup		League Cup		Continental		Total	
Club	Season	Division	Apps	Goals	Apps	Goals	Apps	Goals	Apps	Goals	Apps	Goals
Chainat Hornbill F.C.	2019	Thai League 1	25	0	0	0	0	0	0	0	25	0
Port F.C.	2020-21	Thai League 1	3	0	0	0	0	0	0	0	3	0
Muangthong United (on loan)	2020-21	Thai League 1	24	0	3	0	0	0	0	0	27	0
BG Pathum United F.C.	2021-22	Thai League 1	0	0	0	0	0	0	0	0	0	0
Career total			52	0	3	0	0	0	0	0	55	0

== Honours ==
=== Club ===
BG Pathum United

- Thailand Champions Cup (1): 2021, 2022
