= Worachit Kanitsribampen =

Thai footballer (born 1997)

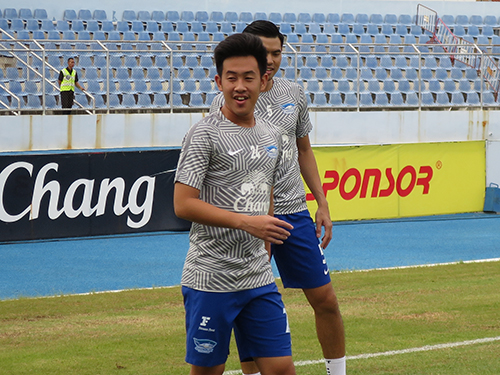
- Kanitsribampen warming up with Chonburi

Personal information
- Full name: Worachit Kanitsribampen
- Date of birth: 24 August 1997 (age 29)
- Place of birth: Chiang Mai, Thailand
- Height: 1.69 m (5 ft 7 in)
- Position: Attacking midfielder

Team information
- Current team: Port
- Number: 44

Youth career
- 2008–2013: Chonburi

Senior career*
Years	Team	Apps	(Gls)
2013–2021	Chonburi	145	(47)
2013	→ Phan Thong (loan)	10	(2)
2014	→ Sriracha/Ban Bueng (loan)	16	(8)
2015	→ Phan Thong (loan)	12	(2)
2022–2023	BG Pathum United	28	(4)
2023	→ Port (loan)	14	(5)
2023–	Port	53	(6)

International career^{‡}
2015–2016	Thailand U19	12	(11)
2018	Thailand U21	4	(0)
2015–2020	Thailand U23	25	(2)
2022	Thailand U23 (wildcard)	6	(1)
2021–	Thailand	40	(3)
Medal record
Thailand under-19
AFF U-19 Youth Championship
Winner	Laos 2015	Team
Thailand under-23
Southeast Asian Games
Gold medal – first place	Malaysia 2017	Team
Silver medal – second place	Vietnam 2021	Team
Thailand
AFF Championship
Winner	AFF Suzuki Cup 2020	Team
Runner-up	ASEAN 2024	Team
Runner-up	ASEAN 2026	Team
- * Club domestic league appearances and goals as of 30 March 2025 ‡ National team caps and goals as of 26 August 2026

Worachit Kanitsribampen (also spelled Kanitsribumphen, Thai: วรชิต กนิตศรีบำเพ็ญ, born 24 August 1997), with nickname: "Gym", is a Thai professional footballer who plays as an attacking midfielder for Thai League 1 club Port and the Thailand national team. His goal during the Thai League Week 11 against Muangthong United is considered one of the top 5 goals of the round in an article by FOX Sports Asia.

== Early career ==
In 2009, Worachit joined Chonburi's academy at the age of 11. In 2013, Worachit went on a two-week trial with Thai-owned English club Leicester City. In 2015, Worachit went on a two-week trial with Japanese club FC Tokyo.

== Club career ==
In 2014, at the age of 16, Worachit debuted for Chonburi's senior team in the second leg of the 2014 Thai Premier League against Samut Songkhram. In the same year, Worachit was loaned to Sriracha/Ban Bueng.

In 2015, Worachit was loaned to Phan Thong in the first leg of the season. However, he returned to Chonburi in the second leg. On August 8, Worachit scored his first goal in the Thai League 1 against Ratchaburi Mitr Phol. His following goal made him the youngest player to score him the Thai League 1, at 18 years and 340 days. Worachit was subbed in the next match against BEC Tero Sasana. On August 19, Worachit started his first match for Chonburi against Buriram United.

On 14 December 2015, Worachit flew to Japan for a week-long trial with FC Tokyo, who finished 4th at the 2015 J1 League. He participated in the senior and U-18 squads.

On 27 July 2019, Worachit scored in his 100th appearance for Chonburi against PT Prachuap.

On 1 December 2021, BG Pathum United signed Worachit with a price of about 30 million baht.

== International career ==
In 2015, Worachit was named as the Thailand U-19 team's captain for the 2015 AFF U-19 Youth Championship in Laos. He led the team to the semi-finals by winning every single match in the group stage, during which he collected three goals for himself. Worachit scored against Malaysia in the semi-finals and scored twice against Vietnam as Thailand won 6-0. Worachit became the tournament's top scorer with 6 goals.

At the age of 18, Worachit was later promoted to the Thailand U-23 team in preparation for the 2016 AFC U-23 Championship in Qatar. He scored for Thailand in his debut, which was a friendly against Suphanburi. At the 2016 AFC U-23 Championship, Worachit came off the bench in two matches of the group stage against Saudi Arabia and North Korea.

In August 2017, he won the gold medal at the 2017 Southeast Asian Games with Thailand.

In 2021, he was called up for the 2020 AFF Championship in Singapore and scored his first goal at senior level on 11 December 2021 in the match against Myanmar.

=== Senior team ===
Worachit Kanitsribampen– goals for Thailand
#	Date	Venue	Opponent	Score	Result	Competition
1.	11 December 2021	National Stadium, Kallang, Singapore	Myanmar	3–0	4–0	2020 AFF Championship
2.	11 June 2022	Markaziy Stadium, Namangan, Uzbekistan	Sri Lanka	2–0	2–0	2023 AFC Asian Cup qualification
3.	8 August 2026	Rajamangala Stadium, Bangkok, Thailand	Myanmar	1–0	2–0	2026 ASEAN Championship

== Honours ==
=== Club ===
BG Pathum United

- Thailand Champions Cup: 2022

Port

- Thai League Cup: 2025–26
- Piala Presiden: 2025

=== International ===
Thailand U-19

- AFF U-19 Youth Championship: 2015

Thailand U-23

- Sea Games Gold Medal: 2017; Silver Medal: 2021
- Dubai Cup: 2017

Thailand

- AFF Championship: 2020
- King's Cup: 2024

ASEAN All-Stars

- Maybank Challenge Cup: 2025

=== Individual ===
- AFF U-19 Youth Championship Top Scorer: 2015
- FA Thailand Award Young Player of the Year: 2018
- Thai League 1 Player of the Month: November 2021, April 2023
