= Apisit Sorada =

Thai footballer (born 1997)

Personal information
- Full name: Apisit Sorada
- Date of birth: 28 February 1997 (age 29)
- Place of birth: Samut Sakhon, Thailand
- Height: 1.73 m (5 ft 8 in)
- Position: Left back

Team information
- Current team: Kanchanaburi Power
- Number: 3

Youth career
- 2009–2010: Trat Sports School
- 2010–2015: Nakhon Pathom Sports School
- 2015–2016: Air Force Central

Senior career*
Years	Team	Apps	(Gls)
2016–2017	Air Force Central	16	(0)
2017–2025	BG Pathum United	107	(6)
2019–2021	→ Chiangmai (loan)	41	(1)
2024–2025	→ Ratchaburi (loan)	21	(1)
2025	Ratchaburi	8	(0)
2026	PT Prachuap	5	(0)
2026–	Kanchanaburi Power	0	(0)

International career^{‡}
2016	Thailand U19	1	(0)
2018	Thailand U21	3	(0)
2018–2019	Thailand U23	2	(0)
2024–	Thailand	6	(0)
Medal record
Thailand
ASEAN Championship
Runner-up	ASEAN 2024	Team
- * Club domestic league appearances and goals as of 14:23, 6 January 2025 (UTC) ‡ National team caps and goals as of 9 October 2025

Apisit Sorada (Thai: อภิสิทธิ์ โสรฎา, born 28 February 1997) is a Thai professional footballer who plays as a left back for Thai League 2 club Kanchanaburi Power.

== International career ==
On 11 October 2024, Apisit made his senior debut by starting against Philippines in the 2024 King's Cup. He was selected in the Thailand squad for the 2024 ASEAN Championship.

== Honours ==
=== Club ===
BG Pathum United

- Thailand Champions Cup: 2021, 2022
- Thai League Cup: 2023–24

=== International ===
Thailand

- King's Cup: 2024
