= Korraphat Nareechan =

Thai footballer

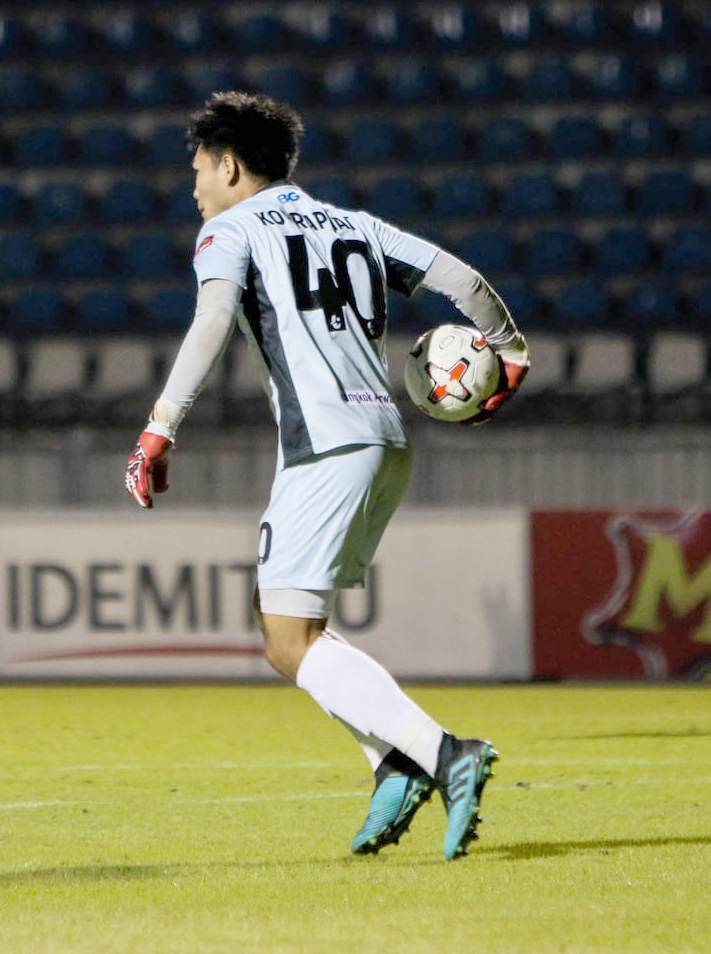

Personal information
- Full name: Korraphat Nareechan
- Date of birth: 7 October 1997 (age 29)
- Place of birth: Lamphun, Thailand
- Height: 1.90 m (6 ft 3 in)
- Position: Goalkeeper

Team information
- Current team: Buriram United
- Number: 29

Youth career
- 2011–2015: BG Pathum United

Senior career*
Years	Team	Apps	(Gls)
2016–2023	BG Pathum United	10	(0)
2019	→ Khon Kaen (loan)	29	(0)
2020–2021	→ Chiangmai (loan)	29	(0)
2022–2023	→ Police Tero (loan)	2	(0)
2023–2025	Lamphun Warriors	16	(0)
2025–	Buriram United	0	(0)

International career
2015–2016	Thailand U19	5	(0)
2017–2018	Thailand U21	6	(0)
2018–2020	Thailand U23	16	(0)
- * Club domestic league appearances and goals

Korraphat Nareechan (Thai: กรพัฒน์ นารีจันทร์, born 7 October 1997) is a Thai professional footballer who plays as a goalkeeper for Thai League 1 club Buriram United.

== International career ==
In 2020, He played the 2020 AFC U-23 Championship with Thailand U23.

== Honours ==
=== Club ===
BG Pathum United

- Thailand Champions Cup: 2021

Buriram United

- Thai League 1: 2025–26

=== International ===
Thailand U-23

- 2019 AFF U-22 Youth Championship: Runner up
