= 2022 Thailand Champions Cup =

Daikin Thailand Champions Cup
- Event: Thailand Champions Cup
Buriram United	BG Pathum United
2	3
- Date: 6 August 2022
- Venue: His Majesty the King's 80th Birthday Anniversary Stadium, Nakhon Ratchasima
- Man of the Match: Sarach Yooyen
- Referee: Torphong Somsing (Thailand)
- Attendance: 16,632
- Weather: Mostly cloudy 28 °C (82 °F) humidity 83%

The 2022 Thailand Champions Cup was the 6th Thailand Champions Cup, an annual football match played between the winners of the previous season's Thai League 1 and Thai FA Cup. As Buriram United won both competitions in 2021–22, their opponents were the 2021–22 Thai League 1 runners-up, BG Pathum United. It was sponsored by Daikin, and known as the Daikin Thailand Champions Cup (Thai: ไดกิ้น ไทยแลนด์แชมเปียนส์คัพ) for sponsorship purposes. The match was played on 6 August 2022 at the His Majesty the King's 80th Birthday Anniversary Stadium in Mueang, Nakhon Ratchasima. It has live broadcast on PPTV HD and AIS Play.

== Qualified teams ==
Team	Qualification	Qualified date	Participation
Buriram United	Winners of the 2021–22 Thai League 1	10 April 2022	3rd
BG Pathum United	Runners-up of the 2021–22 Thai League 1	22 May 2022	2nd

== Match ==
=== Details ===
6 August 2022
18:00 UTC+7

Buriram United	2–3	BG Pathum United
Jonathan Bolingi 35', 84' (pen.)	Report; News; Highlight; Full match	Pathompol Charoenrattanapirom 6'; Ikhsan Fandi 38'; Worachit Kanitsribampen 51'

His Majesty the King's 80th Birthday Anniversary Stadium,
Mueang, Nakhon Ratchasima
Attendance: 16,632
Referee: Torphong Somsing (Thailand)

Buriram United	BG Pathum United

Lineups:
GK	1	(Thailand) Siwarak Tedsungnoen
RB	15	(Thailand) Narubadin Weerawatnodom (c)
CB	3	(Thailand) Pansa Hemviboon
CB	22	(Iraq) Rebin Sulaka			(substituted off) 75'
LB	5	(Thailand) Theerathon Bunmathan
DM	8	(Thailand) Ratthanakorn Maikami
DM	20	(Serbia) Goran Čaušić		(red card) 50'
RM	10	(Colombia) Frank Castañeda			(substituted off) 75'
AM	9	(Thailand) Supachai Chaided			(substituted off) 63'
LM	21	(Thailand) Suphanat Mueanta
CF	99	(Democratic Republic of the Congo) Jonathan Bolingi	35', 84' (pen.)	(yellow card) 44'
Substitutes:
GK	59	(Thailand) Nopphon Lakhonphon
DF	2	(Thailand) Sasalak Haiprakhon			(substituted in) 63'
DF	14	(Thailand) Chitipat Tanklang
DF	44	(Philippines) Diego Bardanca			(substituted in) 75'
MF	6	(Thailand) Peeradon Chamratsamee			(substituted in) 75'
MF	11	(Thailand) Chutipol Thongthae
MF	64	(Thailand) Thirapak Prueangna
MF	67	(Thailand) Thanadol Kaosaart
FW	77	(Myanmar) Aung Thu
Head Coach:
(Japan) Masatada Ishii

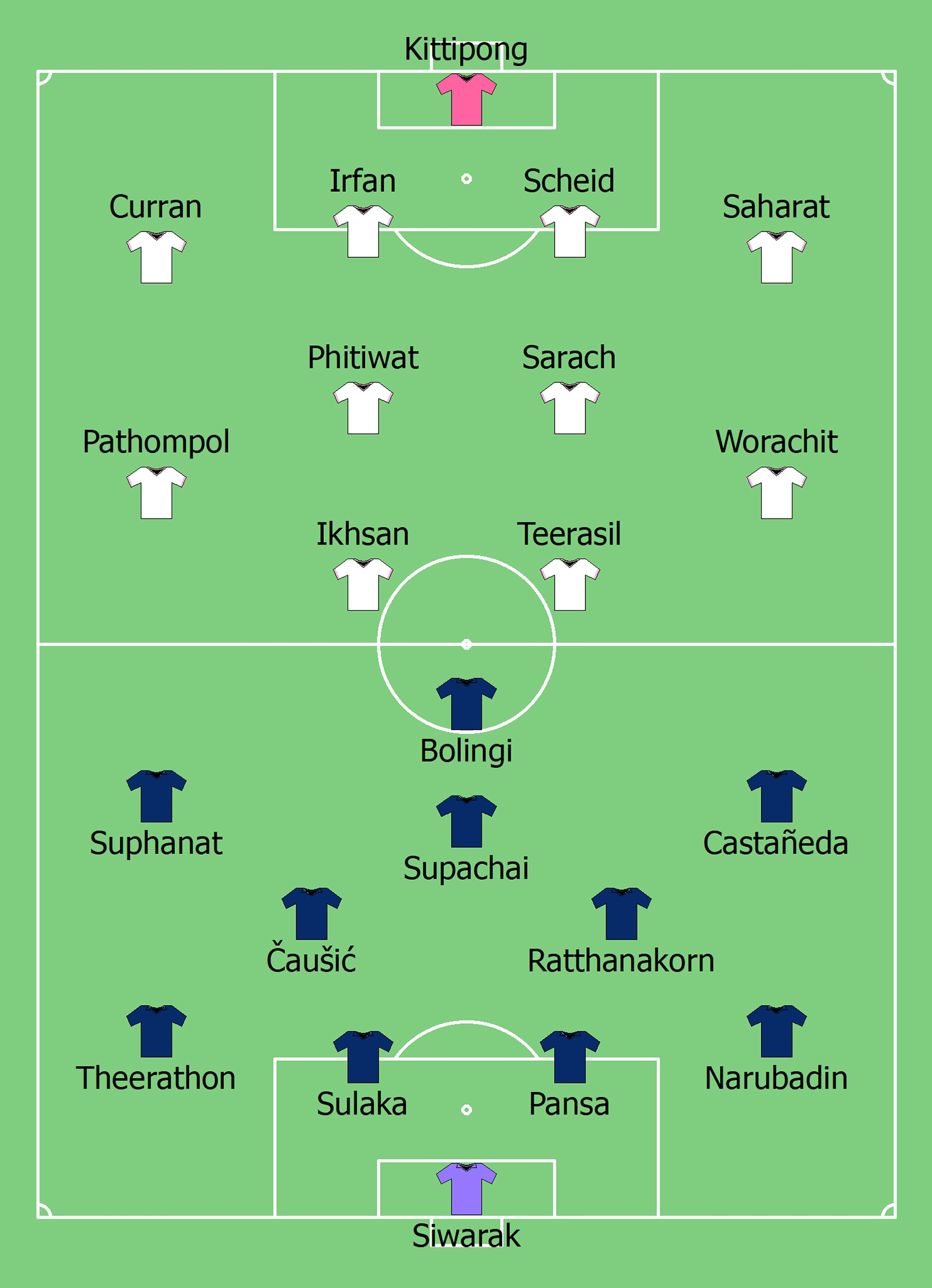

Lineups:
GK	26	(Thailand) Kittipong Phuthawchueak
RB	27	(Philippines) Jesse Curran			(substituted off) 72'
CB	17	(Singapore) Irfan Fandi
CB	41	(Brazil) Cássio Scheid			(substituted off) 72'
LB	3	(Thailand) Saharat Pongsuwan
RM	18	(Thailand) Pathompol Charoenrattanapirom	6'		(substituted off) 64'
CM	36	(Thailand) Phitiwat Sukjitthammakul
CM	6	(Thailand) Sarach Yooyen (c)
LM	8	(Thailand) Worachit Kanitsribampen	51'
CF	99	(Singapore) Ikhsan Fandi	38'		(substituted off) 85'
CF	10	(Thailand) Teerasil Dangda			(substituted off) 64'
Substitutes:
GK	39	(Thailand) Prasit Padungchok
DF	13	(Thailand) Ernesto Phumipha
DF	15	(Thailand) Apisit Sorada
DF	16	(Thailand) Jakkapan Praisuwan			(substituted in) 72'
DF	22	(Thailand) Santiphap Channgom
DF	30	(Venezuela) Andrés Túñez			(substituted in) 72'
MF	11	(Thailand) Jaroensak Wonggorn			(substituted in) 64'
MF	24	(Thailand) Chatmongkol Thongkiri			(substituted in) 85'
FW	7	(Brazil) Diogo		(yellow card) 90+6'	(substituted in) 64'
Head Coach:
(Japan) Makoto Teguramori

Assistant referees:
(Thailand) Apichit Nophuan
(Thailand) Rachain Srichai
Fourth official:
(Thailand) Niwat Insa-ard
Assistant VAR:
(Thailand) Sivakorn Pu-udom
(Thailand) Tanin Reunjit

MATCH RULES

- 90 minutes.
- Penalty shoot-out if necessary.
- Maximum of five substitutions in three times.

== Winner ==
2022 Thailand Champions Cup
Winners
BG Pathum United
Second Title

== See also ==
- 2022–23 Thai League 1
- 2022–23 Thai League 2
- 2022–23 Thai League 3
- 2022–23 Thai League 3 Northern Region
- 2022–23 Thai League 3 Northeastern Region
- 2022–23 Thai League 3 Eastern Region
- 2022–23 Thai League 3 Western Region
- 2022–23 Thai League 3 Southern Region
- 2022–23 Thai League 3 Bangkok Metropolitan Region
- 2022–23 Thai League 3 National Championship
- 2022–23 Thai FA Cup
- 2022–23 Thai League Cup
