= Prasit Padungchok =

Thai footballer

Personal information
- Full name: Prasit Padungchok
- Date of birth: 13 October 1982 (age 44)
- Place of birth: Chaiyaphum, Thailand
- Height: 1.89 m (6 ft 2 1/2 in)
- Position: Goalkeeper

Team information
- Current team: Trat
- Number: 13

Senior career*
Years	Team	Apps	(Gls)
2008–2013	Nakhon Ratchasima	43	(0)
2014–2016	BEC Tero Sasana	29	(0)
2017–2020	Muangthong United	27	(0)
2019	→ Police Tero (loan)	16	(0)
2020–2021	Police Tero	36	(0)
2021–2023	BG Pathum United	9	(0)
2023	Pattaya United	12	(0)
2024	Chanthaburi	29	(0)
2025	Kanchanaburi Power	15	(0)
2025	Sisaket United	9	(0)
2026–	Trat	0	(0)
- * Club domestic league appearances and goals as of 28 November 2025 (UTC)

Prasit Padungchok (Thai: ประสิทธิ์ ผดุงโชค, born October 13, 1982) is a Thai professional footballer who plays as a goalkeeper for Trat.

== International career ==
he was named in head coach Milovan Rajevac's squad for Thailand to the Friendly in October 2017, but did not make an appearance.

== Honours ==
=== Club ===
BEC Tero Sasana

- Thai League Cup: 2014

Muangthong United

- Thai League Cup: 2017
- Thailand Champions Cup: 2017
- Mekong Club Championship: 2017

BG Pathum United

- Thailand Champions Cup: 2022
