= Sarach Yooyen =

Thai footballer

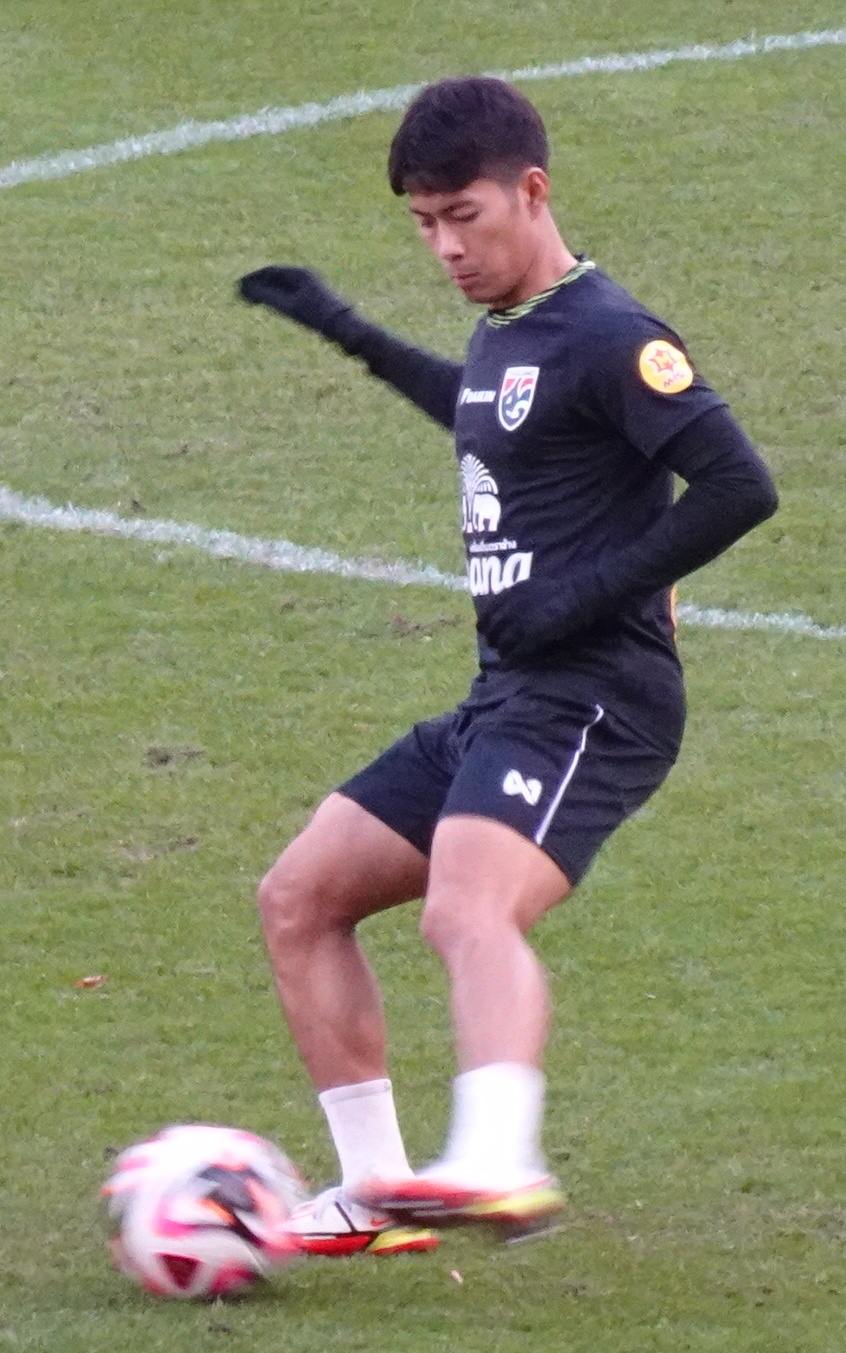
- Sarach training with Thailand in 2024

Personal information
- Full name: Sarach Yooyen
- Date of birth: 30 May 1992 (age 34)
- Place of birth: Songkhla, Thailand
- Height: 1.68 m (5 ft 6 in)
- Position: Midfielder

Team information
- Current team: BG Pathum United
- Number: 6

Youth career
- 1999–2005: Assumption Samutprakarn School
- 2005–2008: Assumption College Nakhonratchasima
- 2008–2009: Assumption College Thonburi
- 2009–2010: Muangthong United

Senior career*
Years	Team	Apps	(Gls)
2010–2020	Muangthong United	162	(9)
2011	→ Phuket (loan)	26	(6)
2013	→ Nakhon Ratchasima (loan)	13	(2)
2020–	BG Pathum United	145	(7)
2024	→ Renofa Yamaguchi (loan)	3	(0)

International career^{‡}
2007–2008	Thailand U16	18	(3)
2009–2010	Thailand U19	15	(5)
2011–2015	Thailand U23	15	(1)
2013–	Thailand	101	(9)
Medal record
Men's football
Representing Thailand
FIFA ASEAN Cup
Runner-up	2026 Indonesia	Team
AFF Championship
Winner	AFF Suzuki Cup 2014	Team
Winner	AFF Suzuki Cup 2016	Team
Winner	AFF Suzuki Cup 2020	Team
Winner	AFF Mitsubishi Electric Cup 2022	Team
Runner-up	ASEAN Hyundai Cup 2026	Team
SEA Games
Gold medal – first place	Sea Games 2015	Football
AFF U-19 Youth Championship
Winner	AFF U-19 Youth Championship 2009	Football
AFF U-17 Youth Championship
Winner	AFF U-17 Youth Championship 2007	Football
- * Club domestic league appearances and goals as of 04:16, 27 May 2026 (UTC) ‡ National team caps and goals as of 17 November 2026

Sarach Yooyen (Thai: สารัช อยู่เย็น, RTGS: Sarat Yuyen; born 30 May 1992) is a Thai professional footballer who plays as a midfielder for BG Pathum United and the Thailand national team.

== Club career ==
=== BG Pathum United ===
Before joining BG Pathum United in August 2020, Sarach made 162 league appearances in total at Muangthong United, scoring nine goals.

== International career ==
=== Youth ===
Sarach Yooyen played for Thailand U23 in the 2011 SEA Games. He represented Thailand U23 in the 2014 Asian Games. He won the 2015 SEA Games with Thailand U23, which he captained.

=== Senior ===
In November 2013, Sarach debuted for Thailand playing against Kuwait in the 2015 AFC Asian Cup qualification. He was part of Thailand's winning squad for the 2014, 2016, 2020, 2022 AFF Championship consequently.

== Style of play ==
Sarach is usually deployed by his club and national sides as a central midfielder, in the role of a deep-lying playmaker, due to his vision and passing accuracy.

== Career statistics ==
=== Club ===
As of match played 27 April 2024

Appearances and goals by club, season and competition
Club	Season	League			FA Cup		League Cup		Continental		Others		Total	
Club	Season	Division	Apps	Goals	Apps	Goals	Apps	Goals	Apps	Goals	Apps	Goals	Apps	Goals
Muangthong United	2010	Thai Premier League	0	0	0	0	0	0	0	0	0	0	0	0
Muangthong United	2012	Thai Premier League	0	0	0	0	0	0	—		—		0	0
Muangthong United	2014	Thai Premier League	29	2	0	0	3	0	1	0	1	0	33	2
Muangthong United	2015	Thai Premier League	32	2	0	0	1	0	—		—		33	2
Muangthong United	2016	Thai League 1	31	1	2	0	3	0	2	0	1	0	39	1
Muangthong United	2017	Thai League 1	6	0	3	0	4	0	0	0	1	1	14	1
Muangthong United	2018	Thai League 1	33	3	3	0	2	0	2	1	—		40	4
Muangthong United	2019	Thai League 1	27	1	2	0	1	0	—		—		30	1
Muangthong United	2020–21	Thai League 1	4	0	0	0	—		—		—		4	0
Muangthong United	Total		162	9	10	0	14	0	5	1	3	1	194	11
Phuket (loan)	2011	Thai Division 1 League	26	6	0	0	0	0	—		—		26	6
Nakhon Ratchasima (loan)	2013	Thai Division 1 League	13	2	0	0	0	0	—		—		13	2
BG Pathum United	2020–21	Thai League 1	28	0	2	0	—		—		—		30	0
BG Pathum United	2021–22	Thai League 1	26	2	3	0	2	0	7	1	1	0	39	3
BG Pathum United	2022–23	Thai League 1	28	3	4	0	5	1	8	0	1	0	46	4
BG Pathum United	2023–24	Thai League 1	29	1	2	0	5	1	6	0	0	0	42	2
BG Pathum United	Total		111	6	11	0	12	2	21	1	2	0	157	9
Career total			312	23	21	0	26	2	26	2	5	1	390	28

=== International goals ===
Scores and results list Thailand's goal tally first.

No.	Date	Venue	Opponent	Score	Result	Competition
1.	1 January 2022	National Stadium, Kallang, Singapore	Indonesia	2–1	2–2	2020 AFF Championship
2.	8 June 2022	Markaziy Stadium, Namangan, Uzbekistan	Maldives	1–0	3–0	2023 AFC Asian Cup qualification
3.	11 December 2022	Thammasat Stadium, Pathum Thani, Thailand	Myanmar	4–0	6–0	Friendly
4.	29 December 2022	Gelora Bung Karno Stadium, Jakarta, Indonesia	Indonesia	1–1	1–1	2022 AFF Championship
5.	13 January 2023	Mỹ Đình National Stadium, Hanoi, Vietnam	Vietnam	2–1	2–2	2022 AFF Championship
6.	16 November 2023	Rajamangala Stadium, Bangkok, Thailand	China	1–0	1–2	2026 FIFA World Cup qualification
7.	13 November 2025	Thammasat Stadium, Pathum Thani, Thailand	Singapore	1–0	3–2	Friendly
8.	25 July 2026	New Laos National Stadium, Vientiane, Laos	Laos	4–0	5–0	2026 ASEAN Championship
9.	29 September 2026	Si Jalak Harupat Stadium, Bandung, Indonesia	Vietnam	1–0	2–0	2026 FIFA ASEAN Cup

== Honours ==
Muangthong United

- Thai Premier League: 2012, 2016
- Thai League Cup: 2016, 2017
- Thailand Champions Cup: 2017
- Mekong Club Championship: 2017

BG Pathum United

- Thai League 1: 2020–21
- Thailand Champions Cup: 2021, 2022
- Thai League Cup: 2023–24

Thailand U-16

- AFF U-16 Youth Championship: 2007

Thailand U-19

- AFF U-19 Youth Championship: 2009

Thailand U-23

- Sea Games Gold Medal: 2015
- BIDC Cup (Cambodia): 2013

Thailand

- AFF Championship: 2014, 2016, 2020, 2022
- King's Cup: 2016, 2026

Individual

- AFF Championship Best XI: 2016, 2022
- Thai League 1 Goal of the Month: March 2022, October 2022
