= Ernesto Amantegui Phumipha =

Thai footballer (born 1990)

Ernesto Phumipha
Personal information
- Full name: Ernesto Amantegui Phumipha
- Date of birth: 16 April 1990 (age 36)
- Place of birth: Oviedo, Spain
- Height: 1.80 m (5 ft 11 in)
- Position: Left-back

Team information
- Current team: Sabah
- Number: 90

Youth career
- 2005–2009: Oviedo

Senior career*
Years	Team	Apps	(Gls)
2009–2011	Oviedo B	54	(7)
2009–2011	Oviedo	12	(0)
2011–2012	Mirandés	15	(0)
2012–2013	Sporting Gijón B	24	(0)
2013	Buriram United	0	(0)
2014–2015	Army United	55	(6)
2016–2018	Bangkok United	31	(0)
2018	→ Air Force Central (loan)	13	(0)
2019	Port	0	(0)
2019	Muangthong United	6	(0)
2020–2021	Samut Prakan City	30	(0)
2021–2023	BG Pathum United	19	(0)
2023	Police Tero	6	(0)
2024	Khon Kaen United	8	(0)
2024–2025	Nakhon Pathom United	27	(0)
2025–	Sabah	8	(0)

International career
2021	Thailand	3	(0)
- * Club domestic league appearances and goals as of 01:45, 19 August 2026 (UTC)

Ernesto Amantegui Phumipha (Thai: เออร์เนสโต อมันเตกี ภูมิภา, born 16 April 1990) is a professional footballer who plays as a left-back. Born in Spain, he plays for Malaysia Super League club Sabah and the Thailand national team.

== Club career ==
Born in Oviedo, Asturias, to a Spanish father of Basque descent and a Thai mother, Amantegui played for local side Real Oviedo, making his debut with the first team on 17 May 2009 in a Tercera División match against CD Condal but spending the vast majority of his two-year spell with the reserves. He continued competing in the third level in the following years, with CD Mirandés and Sporting de Gijón B, contributing with 1,015 minutes of action as the former club promoted to the Segunda División for the first time in its history.

Amantegui signed for Thai Premier League side Buriram United on 23 June 2013, moving to fellow league team Army United for the 2014 campaign. He continued to play at that level in the following years, with Bangkok United, Air Force Central, Muangthong United and Samut Prakan City.

Before the start of 2021 season, he moved to BG Pathum United

== Honours ==
=== Club ===
BG Pathum United

- Thailand Champions Cup: 2021, 2022
