= Yodrak Namuangrak =

Thai footballer (born 1989)

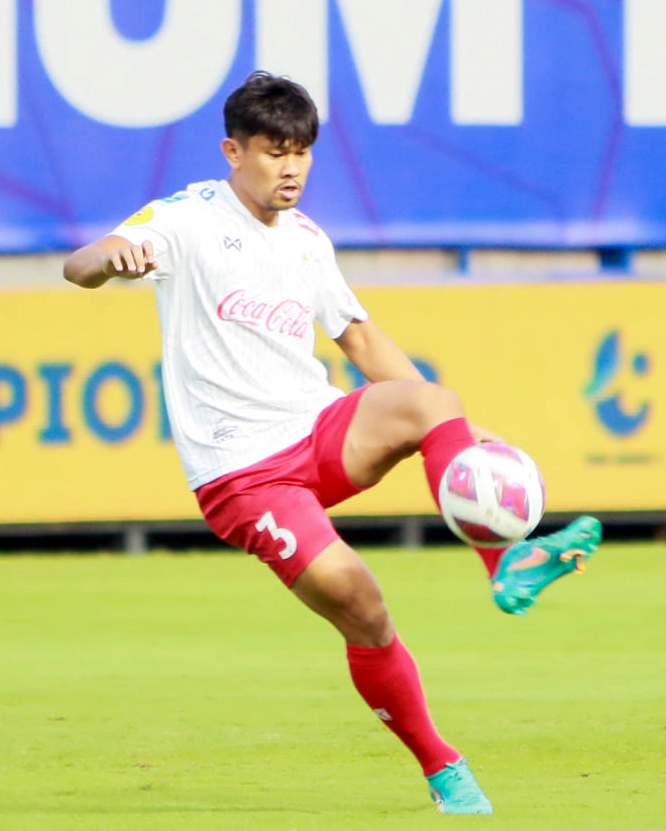
- Yodrak Namuangrak playing for Rajpracha.

Personal information
- Full name: Yodrak Namuangrak
- Date of birth: 19 September 1989 (age 37)
- Place of birth: Roi Et, Thailand
- Height: 1.69 m (5 ft 6 1/2 in)
- Position: Left back

Team information
- Current team: BFB Pattaya City
- Number: 2

Youth career
- 2004–2007: Chulabhon's College Chonburi

Senior career*
Years	Team	Apps	(Gls)
2008–2012	Sriracha	18	(0)
2012–2013	Suphanburi	9	(0)
2014	Singhtarua	29	(1)
2015–2016	Chainat Hornbill	44	(0)
2017	Sisaket	4	(0)
2017	Lampang	24	(0)
2018	Angthong	22	(0)
2018–2021	Rayong	41	(2)
2021–2022	BG Pathum United	6	(0)
2022	→ Rajpracha (loan)	16	(0)
2022–2025	Rayong	84	(2)
2025–2026	Trat	0	(0)
2026–	BFB Pattaya City	0	(0)

International career
2008–2009	Thailand U19		
- * Club domestic league appearances and goals as of 13 July 2025

Yodrak Namuangrak (Thai: ยอดรัก นาเมืองรักษ์, born September 19, 1989), simply known as Yod (Thai: ยอด), is a Thai professional footballer who plays as a left back for Thai League 3 club BFB Pattaya City.

== International career ==
Yordrak played for Thailand U19, and played in the 2008 AFC U-19 Championship.

== International goals ==
=== Under-19 ===
#	Date	Venue	Opponent	Score	Result	Competition
1.	4 August 2007	Thanh Long Sports Complex, Ho Chi Minh City, Vietnam	Cambodia	6-0	7-0	2007 AFF U-20 Youth Championship
2.	7 August 2007	Thanh Long Sports Complex, Ho Chi Minh City, Vietnam	Malaysia	1-2	1-2	2007 AFF U-20 Youth Championship
3.	3 November 2008	Prince Saud bin Jalawi Stadium, Khobar, Saudi Arabia	Jordan	1-0	3-2	2008 AFC U-19 Championship

== Honours ==
=== Club ===
Sriracha

- Thai Division 1 League: 2010

BG Pathum United

- Thailand Champions Cup: 2021
