= Kittipong Phuthawchueak =

Thai footballer

Personal information
- Full name: Kittipong Phuthawchueak
- Date of birth: 26 September 1989 (age 37)
- Place of birth: Kalasin, Thailand
- Height: 1.85 m (6 ft 1 in)
- Position: Goalkeeper

Team information
- Current team: Kanchanaburi Power
- Number: 26

Youth career
- 2004–2006: Sahatsakhansuksa School

Senior career*
Years	Team	Apps	(Gls)
2007–2010	TOT	18	(0)
2011–2014	Suphanburi	24	(0)
2015–2019	Bangkok United	59	(0)
2018	→ Ratchaburi Mitr Phol (loan)	16	(0)
2019	→ Ratchaburi Mitr Phol (loan)	10	(0)
2020	Ratchaburi Mitr Phol	4	(0)
2021	Sukhothai	8	(0)
2021	Police Tero	7	(0)
2022–2025	BG Pathum United	40	(0)
2024–2025	→ Muangthong United (loan)	19	(0)
2025–2026	Kanchanaburi Power	12	(0)

International career^{‡}
2022–2023	Thailand	8	(0)
Medal record
Thailand
Asean Football Championship
Winner	AFF Mitsubishi Electric Cup 2022	2022
- * Club domestic league appearances and goals as of 08:57, 23 May 2025 (UTC) ‡ National team caps and goals as of 7 January 2023

Kittipong Phuthawchueak (Thai: กิตติพงศ์ ภูแถวเชือก, born 3 September 1989), or simply known as Ton (Thai: ต้น), is a Thai professional footballer who plays as a goalkeeper.

== Honours ==
=== Club ===
BG Pathum United

- Thailand Champions Cup: 2022
- Thai League Cup: 2023–24

=== International ===
Thailand

- AFF Championship (1): 2022
