= Athibordee Atirat =

Thai footballer (born 1992)

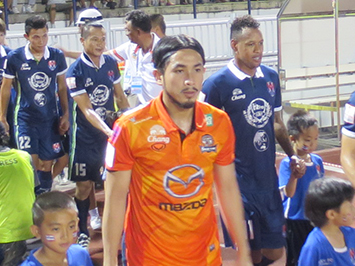

Personal information
- Full name: Athibordee Atirat
- Date of birth: 28 February 1992 (age 34)
- Place of birth: Khonkaen, Thailand
- Height: 1.78 m (5 ft 10 in)
- Positions: Centre back; right back

Youth career
- 2009–2011: Chonburi

Senior career*
Years	Team	Apps	(Gls)
2012–2013	Chonburi	0	(0)
2012	→ Siam Navy (loan)	18	(0)
2013	→ Songkhla United (loan)	15	(0)
2014–2015	Army United	5	(0)
2014–2015	→ Chainat Hornbill (loan)	25	(0)
2015–2017	Nakhon Ratchasima	57	(3)
2017–2020	Port	13	(0)
2018	→ Navy (loan)	13	(1)
2020–2021	Chiangmai	19	(0)
2021–2023	BG Pathum United	0	(0)
2021	→ Nongbua Pitchaya (loan)	1	(0)
2021–2022	→ Rajpracha (loan)	15	(0)
2022–2023	→ Chiangrai United (loan)	6	(0)
2023–2024	Chiangrai United	9	(0)
2025	Chanthaburi	3	(0)
- * Club domestic league appearances and goals as of 1 January 2025

Athibordee Atirat (Thai: อธิบดี เอติรัตน์, born February 28, 1992), simply known as Aekk (Thai: เอก), is a Thai professional footballer who plays as a centre back or a right back.

== Honours ==
Port

- Thai FA Cup (1): 2019
