= Sarawut Koedsri =

Thai football association player (born 1989)

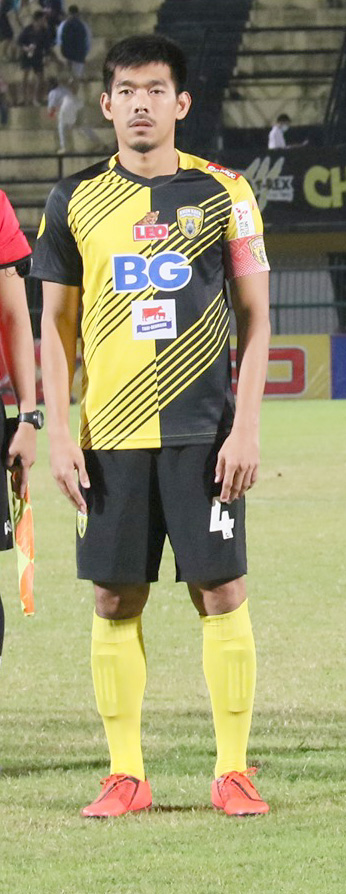
- Sarawut Koedsri playing for Khon Kaen.

Personal information
- Date of birth: 29 April 1989 (age 37)
- Place of birth: Uthai Thani, Thailand
- Height: 1.80 m (5 ft 11 in)
- Position: Centre-back

Team information
- Current team: Kasetsart
- Number: 24

Senior career*
Years	Team	Apps	(Gls)
2010	Uthai Thani		
- Phichit
- Bangkok
–2020	Khon Kaen	40	(0)
2021	Rajpracha	9	(3)
2021–2024	BG Pathum United	11	(0)
2022–2024	→ Chiangmai (loan)	56	(6)
2024–	Kasetsart	21	(0)
- * Club domestic league appearances and goals as of 26 April 2025

Sarawut Koedsri (Thai: ศราวุธ เกิดศรี, born 29 April 1989) is a Thai professional footballer who plays as a centre-back for Thai League 2 club Kasetsart.

== Playing career ==
=== Club ===
Koedsri played for Khon Kaen before transferring to BG Pathum United for the 2021–22 Thai League 1 season.

== Career statistics ==
As of match played 15 January 2022

Appearances and goals by club, season and competition
Club	Season	League			National Cup		League Cup		Continental		Other		Total	
Club	Season	Division	Apps	Goals	Apps	Goals	Apps	Goals	Apps	Goals	Apps	Goals	Apps	Goals
BG Pathum United	2021–22	Thai League 1	6	0	1	0	1	0	1	0	0	0	9	0
BG Pathum United	Total		6	0	1	0	1	0	1	0	0	0	9	0
Career total			6	0	1	0	1	0	1	0	0	0	9	0
