= Suwannapat Kingkaew =

Thai footballer (born 1994)

Personal information
- Full name: Suwannapat Kingkaew
- Date of birth: 10 June 1994 (age 32)
- Place of birth: Ubon Ratchathani, Thailand
- Height: 1.80 m (5 ft 11 in)
- Position: Centre back

Youth career
- 2011–2012: Bangkok Glass

Senior career*
| Years | Team | Apps | (Gls) |
| 2012–2017 | Bangkok Glass | 54 | (0) |
| 2017 | → Chiangmai (loan) | 27 | (0) |
| 2018–2019 | Chiangmai | 51 | (0) |
| 2020–2023 | BG Pathum United | 4 | (0) |
| 2020–2021 | → Rajpracha (loan) | 23 | (0) |
| 2021 | → Suphanburi (loan) | 10 | (0) |
| 2021–2022 | → Ratchaburi Mitr Phol (loan) | 8 | (0) |
| 2022–2023 | → Chiangmai (loan) | 28 | (0) |
| 2023 | Chiangmai | 1 | (0) |
| 2024 | Sukhothai | 4 | (0) |
| 2024–2025 | Phrae United | 23 | (0) |
| 2026 | Mahasarakham | 14 | (0) |

International career
| 2011–2012 | Thailand U19 | 4 | (0) |
| 2015–2016 | Thailand U23 | 1 | (0) |
- * Club domestic league appearances and goals as of 30 April 2023

Suwannapat Kingkaew (Thai: สุวรรณภัทร์ กิ่งแก้ว, born 10 June 1994) is a Thai professional footballer who plays as a defender for Mahasarakham in Thai League 2.

== International career ==
In 2016, Suwannapat was selected in Thailand U23 squad for 2016 AFC U-23 Championship in Qatar.

== Honours ==
=== Clubs ===
Bangkok Glass

- Thai FA Cup (1): 2014

=== International ===
Thailand U-19

- AFF U-19 Youth Championship (1): 2011
