= Siwakorn Sangwong =

Thai footballer (born 1997)

Personal information
- Full name: Siwakorn Sangwong
- Date of birth: 6 February 1997 (age 29)
- Place of birth: Pathum Thani, Thailand
- Height: 1.69 m (5 ft 6 1/2 in)
- Position: Defensive midfielder

Youth career
- 2009–2014: Bangkok Glass

Senior career*
Years	Team	Apps	(Gls)
2015–2021	BG Pathum United	38	(0)
2020	→ Chiangmai (loan)	12	(0)
2021	→ Khonkaen (loan)	11	(0)
2021–2024	Rayong	103	(1)

International career
2015–2016	Thailand U19	3	(0)
- * Club domestic league appearances and goals as of 30 April 2023

Siwakorn Sangwong (Thai: ศิวกร แสงวงศ์, born February 6, 1997) is a Thai professional footballer who plays as a defensive midfielder.

== Honours ==
=== Club ===
BG Pathum United

- Thai League 2 (1) : 2019
