= Thailand Champions Cup =

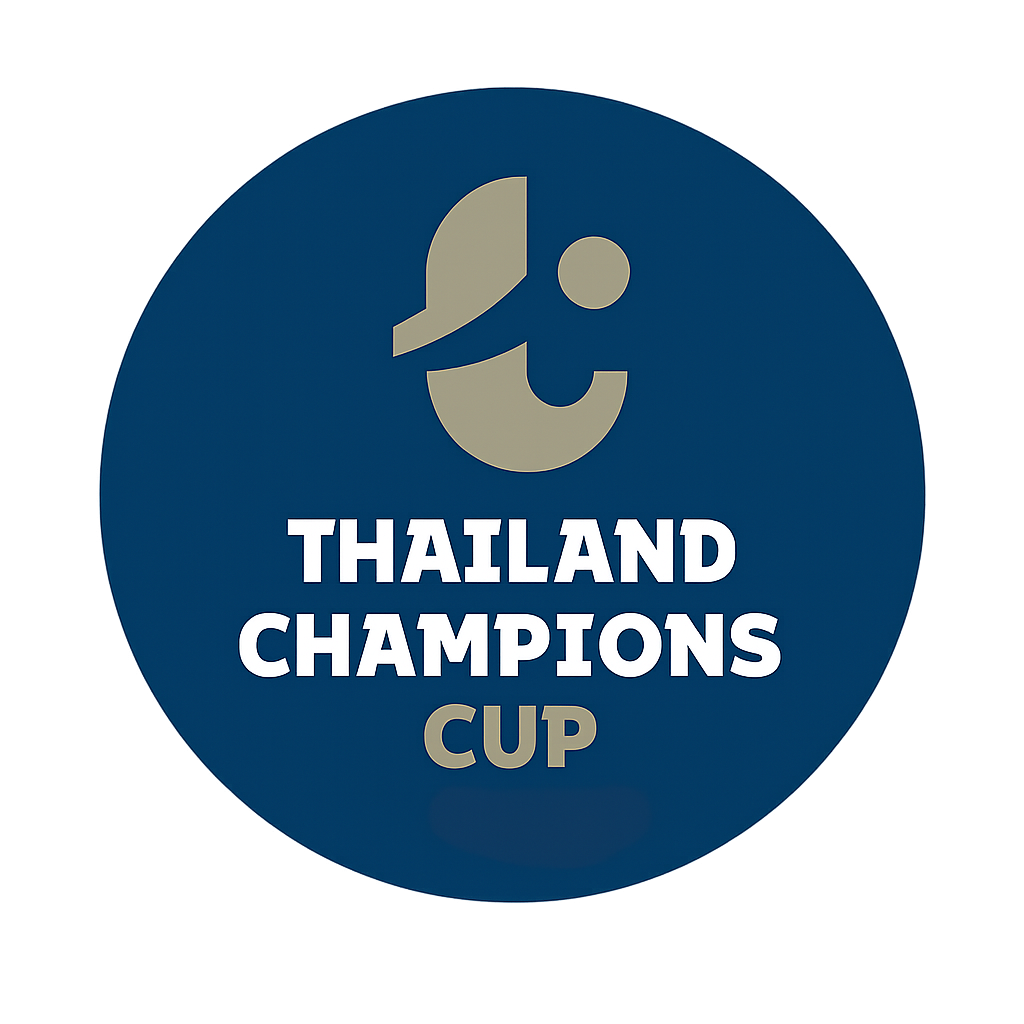
- Organiser(s): Football Association of Thailand
- Founded: 2017; 9 years ago
- Region: Thailand
- Teams: 2
- Related competitions: Thai FA Cup (qualifier); Thai League 1 (qualifier)
- Current champions: Bangkok United (1st title)
- Most championships: Chiangrai United; BG Pathum United (2 titles)
- 2027 Thailand Champions Cup

The Thailand Champions Cup (continuing Kor Royal Cup, a different competition from the Thai Super Cup) is a single-game competition between the winners of previous Thai League 1 and Thai FA Cup, organised by the Football Association of Thailand. If the Thai League 1 champions also won the FA Cup, then the league runners-up provide the opposition. The first edition started in 2017 in order to replace the Kor Royal Cup.

== Participating clubs ==
Under the normal circumstances, the following clubs participate:

- Defending Thai League 1 champions
- Defending Thai FA Cup winners

== Venues ==
=== Permanent venues ===
Since 2017, Thailand Champions Cup has been at a permanent home rather than guest venues.

- Supachalasai Stadium: 2017–2018
- Thai Army Sports Stadium: 2019
- SCG Stadium: 2020
- 700th Anniversary Stadium: 2021
- 80th Birthday Stadium: 2022
- Rajamangala Stadium: 2023

== Results ==
Key
†	Match decided by a penalty shootout after full-time

(also see champions history wherein Thailand Champions Cup continues the competition Kor Royal Cup, which was folded in 2016)

Thailand Champions Cup winners
Year	Winner	Score	Runner-up	Venue
2017	Muangthong United	5–0	Sukhothai	Supachalasai Stadium
2018	Chiangrai United	2–2 (8–7 p)^{†}	Buriram United	Supachalasai Stadium
2019	Buriram United	3–1	Chiangrai United	Royal Thai Army Stadium
2020	Chiangrai United	2–0	Port	SCG Stadium
2021	BG Pathum United	1–0	Chiangrai United	700th Anniversary Stadium
2022	BG Pathum United	3–2	Buriram United	80th Birthday Stadium
2023	Bangkok United	2–0	Buriram United	Rajamangala Stadium
2024	Not held			
2025	Not held			
2026	Not held			
2027				

== Results by club ==
Team	Champions	Runners-up	Total
Chiangrai United	2 (2018, 2020)	2 (2019, 2021)	4
BG Pathum United	2 (2021, 2022)	0	2
Buriram United	1 (2019)	3 (2018, 2022, 2023)	4
Muangthong United	1 (2017)	0	1
Bangkok United	1 (2023)	0	1
Sukhothai	0	1 (2017)	1
Port	0	1 (2020)	1
