= 2024–25 BG Pathum United F.C. season =

Association football season

BG Pathum United
2024–25 season
- Chairman: (Thailand) Pavin Bhirombhakdi
- Manager: (Japan) Makoto Teguramori (until 8 October 2024) (Thailand) Surachai Jaturapattarapong
- Stadium: BG Stadium, Thanyaburi, Pathum Thani, Thailand
Home colours	Away colours	Third colours

The 2024–25 season is BG Pathum United's fifth consecutive season in Thai League 1, following promotion in 2019.

In addition to the domestic league, the club will also compete in this season's editions of the Thai FA Cup, Thai League Cup, and the 2024–25 ASEAN Club Championship.

== Squad ==
As of 31 July 2024

No.	Name	Nationality	Date of birth (age)	Previous club	Contract since	Contract end
Goalkeepers
1	Jung Hyeon-ho	(South Korea)	26 November 2004 (age 21)	(South Korea) Chungbuk Cheongju FC (K2)	2025	
28	Saranon Anuin	(Thailand)	24 March 1994 (age 32)	(Thailand) Chiangrai United	2024	
38	Nattapong Khajohnmalee	(Thailand)	10 May 1994 (age 32)	(Thailand) Chanthaburi	2024	
85	Issarapong Waewdee	(Thailand)	1 October 2004 (age 21)	(Thailand) Debsirin School	2023	
93	Pisan Dorkmaikaew	(Thailand)	10 May 1984 (age 42)	(Thailand) PT Prachuap	2024	
Defenders
2	Sanchai Nontasila	(Thailand)	30 March 1996 (age 30)	(Thailand) Ratchaburi	2024	
13	Marco Ballini	(Thailand) (Italy)	12 June 1998 (age 28)	(Thailand) Chiangrai United	2024	2026
16	Nika Sandokhadze	(Georgia (country))	20 February 1994 (age 32)	(Georgia (country)) FC Torpedo Kutaisi (G1)	2025	
20	Hwang Myung-hyun	(South Korea)	14 November 2001 (age 24)	(South Korea) Suwon Samsung Bluewings (K2)	2025	2026
23	Santipharp Chan-ngom	(Thailand)	23 September 1996 (age 29)	(Thailand) Police Tero	2019	2026
26	Thanet Suknate	(Thailand)	26 July 2005 (age 21)	(Singapore) BG Tampines Rovers (S1)	2023	2027
29	Warinthon Jamnongwat	(Thailand)	21 September 2002 (age 23)	(Thailand) Chainat Hornbill		
47	Nuttawut Wongsawang	(Thailand)	19 April 2004 (age 22)	Youth Team	2025	2026
49	Khatawut Poladao	(Thailand)	21 April 2006 (age 20)	Youth Team	2025	2026
69	Seydine N'Diaye	(France) (Niger)	23 April 1998 (age 28)	(Finland) Ilves (F1)	2024	
78	Christian Gomis	(France) (Senegal)	25 August 1998 (age 27)	(Hungary) Mezőkövesdi SE (H1)	2024	
81	Waris Choolthong	(Thailand)	8 January 2004 (age 22)	Youth Team	2022	
Midfielders
5	Kritsada Kaman	(Thailand)	18 March 1999 (age 27)	(Thailand) Chonburi	2024	2027
6	Sarach Yooyen	(Thailand)	30 May 1992 (age 34)	(Japan) Renofa Yamaguchi (J2)	2020	2026
8	Airfan Doloh	(Thailand)	26 January 2001 (age 25)	(Thailand) Uthai Thani	2024	2027
14	Freddy Álvarez	(Costa Rica)	26 April 1995 (age 31)	(North Macedonia) KF Shkupi (M1)	2023	2025
15	Kodai Tanaka	(Japan)	17 May 2001 (age 25)	(United States) LSU University Shreveport (Amateur)	2025	
17	Gakuto Notsuda	(Japan)	6 June 1994 (age 32)	(Japan) Sanfrecce Hiroshima (J1)	2024	
18	Chanathip Songkrasin	(Thailand)	5 October 1993 (age 32)	(Japan) Kawasaki Frontale (J1)	2023	2027
24	Kanokpon Buspakom	(Thailand)	20 September 1999 (age 26)	(Thailand) Nakhon Ratchasima	2022	2027
34	Wachirawut Saenchek	(Thailand)	24 March 2007 (age 19)	Youth Team	2025	2026
35	Thanakan Papaphe	(Thailand)		Youth Team	2025	2026
50	Teerapat Pruetong	(Thailand)	17 February 2007 (age 19)	(Thailand) PTT Academy	2025	2026
59	Anan Samaae	(Thailand)	11 November 2005 (age 20)	Youth Team	2025	2027
Strikers
9	Surachat Sareepim	(Thailand)	24 October 1986 (age 39)	(Thailand) Police Tero	2016	
10	Teerasil Dangda	(Thailand)	6 June 1988 (age 38)	(Japan) Shimizu S-Pulse (J1)	2021	
11	Patrik Gustavsson	(Thailand) (Sweden)	19 April 2001 (age 25)	(Japan) Nara Club (J3)	2022	2029
22	Chananan Pombuppha	(Thailand)	17 March 1992 (age 34)	(Thailand) Bangkok United	2024	
45	Nattawut Suksum	(Thailand)	6 November 1997 (age 28)	(Thailand) Ayutthaya United	2024	
54	Kongnat Thuamthongdee	(Thailand)	25 January 2007 (age 19)	Youth Team	2025	
75	Raniel	(Brazil)	11 June 1996 (age 30)	(United Arab Emirates) Khor Fakkan Club (U1)	2024	
88	Thinnaphob Raihinthaung	(Thailand)	15 January 2008 (age 18)	Youth Team	2024	2025
91	Ilhan Fandi	(Singapore) (South Africa)	8 November 2002 (age 23)	(Belgium) K.M.S.K. Deinze (B2)	2024	2028
99	Ikhsan Fandi	(Singapore) (South Africa)	9 April 1999 (age 27)	(Norway) FK Jerv (N2)	2022	2027
Players loaned out during season
4	Chaowat Veerachat	(Thailand)	23 June 1996 (age 30)	(Japan) Cerezo Osaka (J1)	2017	
5	Victor Cardozo	(Brazil)	19 December 1989 (age 36)	(Thailand) Chiangrai United	2020	
15	Apisit Sorada	(Thailand)	28 February 1997 (age 29)	(Thailand) Chiangmai	2017	
19	Thanadol Kaosaart (M)	(Thailand)	18 August 2001 (age 24)	(Thailand) Customs United	2024	
26	Kittipong Phuthawchueak (G)	(Thailand)	26 September 1989 (age 36)	(Thailand) Police Tero	2022	
31	Thawatchai Inprakhon (D)	(Thailand)	31 March 2003 (age 23)	(Thailand) Police Tero		
49	Nalawich Intacharoen (G)	(Thailand)	11 November 2003 (age 22)	(Thailand) Chiangmai		
55	Chonnapat Buaphan (D)	(Thailand)	22 March 2004 (age 22)	(Thailand) Lamphun Warriors	2022	
77	Sivakorn Tiatrakul	(Thailand)	7 July 1994 (age 32)	(Thailand) Chiangrai United	2024	
90	Melvyn Lorenzen	(Uganda) (Germany) (England)	26 November 1994 (age 31)	(Thailand) Nakhon Ratchasima	2024	
	Kiadtiphon Udom (G)	(Thailand)	26 June 2000 (age 26)	(Japan) Nara Club (J3)	2018	
	Adisak Sosungnoen (D)	(Thailand)	13 March 1996 (age 30)	(Thailand) Chanthaburi		
	Thitipat Ekarunpong (F)	(Thailand)	5 January 2005 (age 21)	(Singapore) BG Tampines Rovers (S1)		
	Thanakrit Laorkai (M)	(Thailand)	22 December 2003 (age 22)	(Thailand) Nakhon Si United		
	Chatmongkol Thongkiri (M)	(Thailand)	5 May 1997 (age 29)	(Thailand) PT Prachuap		
	Ekanit Panya	(Thailand)	21 October 1999 (age 26)	(Japan) Urawa Red Diamonds		
	Jaroensak Wonggorn	(Thailand)	18 May 1997 (age 29)	(Thailand) Muangthong United		
Players left during season
	Lars Veldwijk	(South Africa) (Netherlands)	21 August 1991 (age 34)	(Spain) CD Castellón (S2)	2025	
	Denis Bušnja	(Croatia)	14 April 2000 (age 26)	(Thailand) Muangthong United	2024	
	Chatchai Budprom	(Thailand)	4 February 1987 (age 39)	(Thailand) PT Prachuap		
	Shinnaphat Leeaoh	(Thailand)	2 February 1997 (age 29)	(Thailand) Chiangrai United		
	Igor Sergeyev	(Uzbekistan)	30 April 1993 (age 33)	(Kazakhstan) FC Tobol (K1)		
	Jakkapan Praisuwan	(Thailand)	16 August 1994 (age 31)	(Thailand) Muangthong United		
Players not registered

== Coaching staff ==
The following list displays the coaching staff of all the BG Pathum United current football sections:

First Team

Position	Name
Chairman	(Thailand) Pavin Bhirombhakdi
Head Coach	(Thailand) Supachai Komsilp
Asst. Coach	Peerapong Pichitchotirat; Amnart Kaewkhew
Goalkeeper Coach	(Brazil) Marquinhos Domingues
Interpreter	Hasdin Sukkoki
Doctor	Pakapon Issaragrisil
Physiotherapist	Yongsak Lertdamrongkiet; Saranyoo Kheawlek; Chalotorn Chaisiri
Fitness Trainer	(Brazil) Neri Caldeira; Auttapon Boonsan
Nutritionist	Thanatpong Sukwong

== Transfer ==
=== In ===
Pre-Season

Position	Player	Transferred from	Ref
GK	(Thailand) Nattapong Khajohnmalee	(Thailand) Chanthaburi F.C.	Free
GK	(Thailand) Saranon Anuin	(Thailand) Chiangrai United	Free
DF	(Thailand) (Italy) Marco Ballini	(Thailand) Chiangrai United	Free
DF	(Thailand) Sanchai Nontasila	(Thailand) Ratchaburi	Free
DF	(Thailand) Warinthon Jamnongwat	(Thailand) Chainat Hornbill	Free
DF	(France) (Senegal) Christian Gomis	(Hungary) Mezőkövesdi SE (H1)	Free
DF	(Thailand) Thawatchai Inprakhon	(Thailand) Buriram United	Exchange for (Thailand) Phitiwat Sukjitthammakul
MF	(Thailand) Thanadol Kaosaart	(Thailand) Buriram United	Exchange for (Thailand) Phitiwat Sukjitthammakul
MF	(Thailand) Airfan Doloh	(Thailand) Buriram United	Exchange for (Thailand) Phitiwat Sukjitthammakul
MF	(Japan) Gakuto Notsuda	(Japan) Sanfrecce Hiroshima (J1)	Free
MF	(Thailand) Sivakorn Tiatrakul	(Thailand) Chiangrai United	฿12m
MF	(Thailand) Jaroensak Wonggorn	(Thailand) Muangthong United	฿20m
FW	(Thailand) Nattawut Suksum	(Thailand) Bangkok United	Free
FW	(Uganda) (Germany) (England) Melvyn Lorenzen	(Thailand) Nakhon Ratchasima	Free
FW	(South Africa) (Netherlands) Lars Veldwijk	(Spain) CD Castellón (S3)	Free
FW	(South Africa) (Singapore) Ilhan Fandi	(Belgium) K.M.S.K. Deinze (B2)	Free
FW	(Brazil) Raniel	(United Arab Emirates) Khor Fakkan Club (U1)	Free

Note 1:

Mid-Season

Position	Player	Transferred from	Ref
GK	(South Korea) Jung Hyeon-ho	(South Korea) Chungbuk Cheongju FC (K2)	Free
DF	(South Korea) Hwang Myung-hyun	(South Korea) Samsung Suwon Bluewings (K2)	Free
DF	(Georgia (country)) Nika Sandokhadze	(Georgia (country)) FC Torpedo Kutaisi (G1)	Free
MF	(Japan) Kodai Tanaka	(United States) LSU University Shreveport (Amateur)	Free
MF	(Thailand) Ekanit Panya	(Thailand) Muangthong United	Undisclosed (Note: Ekanit Panya signed from MTU before loaned to Cerezo Osaka.)

Postseason

Position	Player	Transferred from	Ref
GK	(Bosnia and Herzegovina) Slaviša Bogdanović	(Saudi Arabia) Al-Ain	Free
DF	(Montenegro) Miloš Drinčić	(India) Kerala Blasters	Free
FW	(Brazil) Matheus Fornazari	(Thailand) Sukhothai	Free

=== Out ===
Pre-Season

Position	Player	Transferred To	Ref
GK	(Thailand) Fahas Bilanglod	(Thailand) Chiangrai United	Free
DF	(Thailand) Wattanakorn Sawatlakhorn	(Thailand) Uthai Thani	Free
DF	(Thailand) Sirachat Krasaethong	(Thailand) Rajpracha	Free
DF	(Thailand) Saranyawat Naprasert	(Thailand) Suphanburi	Free
DF	(Thailand) Supasak Sarapee	(Thailand) Samut Prakan City	Free
DF	(Serbia) Veljko Filipović	(Thailand) Nakhon Pathom United	Free
DF	(Singapore) (South Africa) Irfan Fandi	(Thailand) Port	Free
DF	(Singapore) (Wales) Ryhan Stewart	(Japan) Albirex Niigata (S)	Free
MF	(Singapore) (Wales) Harhys Stewart	(Thailand) Chiangrai United	Free
MF	(Thailand) Sattawas Leela	(Thailand) Police Tero	Free
MF	(Thailand) Phitiwat Sukjitthammakul	(Thailand) Buriram United	Exchange for (Thailand) Thawatchai Inprakhon, (Thailand) Thanadol Kaosaart & (Thailand) Airfan Doloh
MF	(Thailand) Nattaphon Worasut	(Thailand) Ayutthaya United	Free
FW	(Thailand) Pongrawit Jantawong	(Thailand) Chanthaburi	Free
FW	(Thailand) Chenrop Samphaodi	(Thailand) PT Prachuap	Free
FW	(Thailand) Tawan Khotrsupho	(Thailand) Lamphun Warriors	Free
FW	(Thailand) (Switzerland) Chitchanok Xaysensourinthone	(Thailand) Chiangrai United	Free
FW	(Thailand) Supasan Arjrod	(Thailand) Chachoengsao Hi-Tek	Free
FW	(Brazil) Danilo Alves	(Indonesia) PSS Sleman (ID1)	Free

Note 1:

Mid-Season

Position	Player	Transferred To	Ref
GK	(Thailand) Chatchai Budprom	(Thailand) Buriram United	Undiclosed
DF	(Thailand) Jakkapan Praisuwan	(Thailand) Bangkok United	Free
FW	(Croatia) Denis Bušnja	(Croatia) NK Lokomotiva Zagreb	Free (Note: Denis Bušnja's contract mutually terminated after 1st leg loan to Muangthong United is completed.)
FW	(South Africa) (Netherlands) Lars Veldwijk	(United Arab Emirates) Gulf United	Free
FW	(Uzbekistan) Igor Sergeyev	(Uzbekistan) Pakhtakor FC	Free

Postseason

Position	Player	Transferred To	Ref
GK	(Thailand) Kittipong Phuthawchueak	(Thailand) Muangthong United	Free
DF	(Senegal) (France) Christian Gomis		Free
FW	(Thailand) Teerasil Dangda	(Thailand)	Free
FW	(South Africa) (Singapore) Ilhan Fandi	(Thailand) PT Prachuap	Season loan
FW	(South Africa) (Singapore) Ikhsan Fandi	(Thailand) Ratchaburi	Season loan

=== Loan Out ===
Pre-Season

Position	Player	Transferred To	Ref
GK	(Thailand) Kiadtiphon Udom	(Japan) Nara Club (J3)	Season loan till December 2024 (Note: The loan was terminated before the due date)
GK	(Thailand) Chatchai Budprom	(Thailand) PT Prachuap	Season loan till June 2025
GK	(Thailand) Kittipong Phuthawchueak	(Thailand) Muangthong United	Season loan till June 2025
GK	(Thailand) Nalawich Intacharoen	(Thailand) Nakhon Si United	Season loan till June 2025
DF	(Thailand) Thanawat Pimyotha	(Thailand) Chiangrai United	Season loan
DF	(Thailand) Jakkapan Praisuwan	(Thailand) Muangthong United	Season loan till June 2025
DF	(Thailand) Apisit Sorada	(Thailand) Ratchaburi	Season loan till June 2025
DF	(Thailand) Adisak Sosungnoen	(Thailand) Khon Kaen United	Season loan till June 2025
DF	(Brazil) Victor Cardozo	(Thailand) Lamphun Warriors F.C.	Season loan till June 2025
DF	(Thailand) Thanet Suknate	(Singapore) BG Tampines Rovers (S1)	Season loan till June 2025
MF	(Thailand) Chatmongkol Thongkiri	(Thailand) PT Prachuap	Season loan till June 2025
MF	(Thailand) Sarach Yooyen	(Japan) Renofa Yamaguchi FC (J2)	Season loan till December 2024
MF	(Thailand) Kanokpon Buspakom	(Thailand) Rayong	Season loan till June 2025
MF	(Thailand) Thanakrit Laorkai	(Thailand) Nakhon Si United	Season loan till June 2025
FW	(Croatia) Denis Bušnja	(Thailand) Muangthong United	Season loan till December 2024
FW	(Thailand) (Sweden) Patrik Gustavsson	(Japan) Nara Club (J3)	Season loan till December 2024
FW	(Thailand) Thitipat Ekarunpong	(Singapore) BG Tampines Rovers (S1)	Season loan till June 2025
GK	(Thailand) Kiadtiphon Udom	(Thailand) Chiangrai United	Season loan till June 2025 (Note: The loan was terminated before the due date and he move to Phrae for second leg.)

Mid-Season

Position	Player	Transferred To	Ref
GK	(Thailand) Kiadtiphon Udom	(Thailand) Phrae United	Season loan till June 2025
DF	(Thailand) Shinnaphat Leeaoh	(Thailand) Ratchaburi	Season loan
DF	(Thailand) Chonnapat Buaphan	(Japan) Nara Club (J3)	Season loan till Dec 2025
DF	(Thailand) Thawatchai Inprakhon	(Japan) Nara Club (J3)	Season loan till Dec 2025
MF	(Thailand) Thanadol Kaosaart	(Thailand) Nakhon Ratchasima	Season loan
MF	(Thailand) Sivakorn Tiatrakul	(Thailand) PT Prachuap	Season loan till May 2026
MF	(Thailand) Chaowat Veerachat	(Thailand) Chonburi (T2)	Season loan till May 2026
MF	(Thailand) Nanthiphat Chaiman	(Singapore) BG Tampines Rovers (S1)	Season loan till June 2025
MF	(Thailand) Witthawat Phraothaisong	(Singapore) BG Tampines Rovers (S1)	Season loan till June 2025
MF	(Thailand) Jaroensak Wonggorn	(Japan) Cerezo Osaka (J1)	Season loan till June 2025
MF	(Thailand) Ekanit Panya	(Japan) Ehime FC (J2)	Season loan till 31 July 2025
MF	(Thailand) Thanakrit Laorkai	(Japan) FC Tiamo Hirakata (J4)	Season loan till Dec 2025
FW	(Thailand) Thitipat Ekarunpong	(Japan) FC Tiamo Hirakata (J4)	Season loan till Dec 2025
FW	(Uganda) (Germany) (England) Melvyn Lorenzen	(Thailand) Muangthong United	Season loan till June 2025

=== Return from loan ===
Pre-Season

Position	Player	Transferred from	Ref
GK	(Thailand) Chatchai Budprom	(Thailand) PT Prachuap F.C.	Loan Return
GK	(Thailand) Fahas Bilanglod	(Thailand) Chiangmai F.C.	Loan Return
DF	(Thailand) Sarawut Koedsri	(Thailand) Chiangmai F.C.	Loan Return
DF	(Thailand) Supasak Sarapee	(Thailand) Chanthaburi F.C.	Loan Return
DF	(Serbia) Veljko Filipović	(Thailand) Chiangrai United F.C.	Loan Return
DF	(Thailand) Sirachat Krasaethong	(Thailand) Mae Chai Thanachotiwat	Loan Return
MF	(Singapore) (Wales) Harhys Stewart	(Thailand) Chiangrai United F.C.	Loan Return
MF	(Thailand) Chatmongkol Thongkiri	(Thailand) PT Prachuap F.C.	Loan Return
MF	(Thailand) Nattaphon Worasut	(Thailand) Nakhon Pathom United	Loan Return
FW	(Thailand) (Switzerland) Chitchanok Xaysensourinthone	(Thailand) Chiangmai F.C.	Loan Return
FW	(Thailand) Tawan Khotrsupho	(Thailand) Chiangmai F.C.	Loan Return
FW	(Thailand) Pongrawit Jantawong	(Thailand) Chanthaburi F.C.	Loan Return
FW	(Thailand) Supasan Arjrod	(Thailand) Mae Chai Thanachotiwat	Loan Return

Mid-Season

Position	Player	Transferred from	Ref
GK	(Thailand) Kiadtiphon Udom	(Thailand) Chiangrai United	Loan Return (Note: The loan was terminated before the due date and he move to Phrae for second leg.)
GK	(Thailand) Chatchai Budprom	(Thailand) PT Prachuap	Loan Return (Note: The loan was terminated before the due date as he moved to Buriram United.)
DF	(Thailand) Jakkapan Praisuwan	(Thailand) BG Pathum United	Loan Return (Note: Jakkapan Praisuwan's loan curtailed at end of leg 1 and released from club.)
DF	(Thailand) Thanet Suknate	(Singapore) BG Tampines Rovers (S1)	Loan Return (Note: Thanet Suknate's loan curtailed at end of leg 1)
MF	(Thailand) Kanokpon Buspakom	(Thailand) Rayong	Loan Return
MF	(Thailand) Sarach Yooyen	(Japan) Renofa Yamaguchi FC (J2)	Loan Return
MF	(Thailand) Thanakrit Laorkai	(Thailand) Nakhon Si United	Loan Return (Note: Thanakrit Laorkai's loan curtailed at end of leg 1 and moved to FC Tiamo Hirakata (J4))
FW	(Croatia) Denis Bušnja	(Thailand) Muangthong United	Loan Return (Note: Contract with Denis Bušnja was terminated mutually.)
FW	(Thailand) (Sweden) Patrik Gustavsson	(Japan) Nara Club (J3)	Loan Return (Note: Join MTU on loan for 2nd leg after Nara's loan ended)
FW	(Thailand) Thitipat Ekarunpong	(Singapore) BG Tampines Rovers (S1)	Loan Return (Note: Thitipat Ekarunpong's loan curtailed at end of leg 1 and moved to FC Tiamo Hirakata (J4))

=== Extension / Retained ===
Position	Player	Ref
GK	(Thailand) Pisan Dorkmaikaew	1-year extension till June 2025
GK	(Thailand) Kittipong Phuthawchueak	1-year extension till June 2025
MF	(Costa Rica) Freddy Álvarez	1-year extension till June 2025
FW	(Thailand) Surachat Sareepim	1-year extension till June 2025
FW	(Thailand) Chananan Pombuppha	1-year extension till June 2025
FW	(Singapore) (South Africa) Ikhsan Fandi	3 years extension till June 2027

=== Promoted ===
Position	Player	Ref

== Friendlies ==
=== Pre-Season Friendly ===
Win Draw Loss

17 July 2024	BG Pathum United (Thailand)	2–2	(Cambodia) Visakha FC	Pathum Thani
				Stadium: BG Stadium

21 July 2024 BVB Asia Tour	BG Pathum United (Thailand)	4–0	(Germany) Borussia Dortmund	Pathum Thani
	Lorenzen 15'; Dangda 44'; Wonggorn 65', 88'			Stadium: BG Stadium; Attendance: 14,114; Referee: Torpong Somsingha (Thailand)

27 July 2024	BG Pathum United (Thailand)	3–1	(Hong Kong) Kitchee SC	Pathum Thani
				Stadium: BG Stadium

30 July 2024	BG Pathum United (Thailand)	30-0	(American Samoa) Pago Youth	Pathum Thani
				Stadium: BG Stadium

=== Mid-Season Friendly ===
Win Draw Loss

19 December 2024	Uthai Thani	0–2	BG Pathum United	Uthai Thani
			Nattawut Suksum 5'; Chananan Pombuppha 36'	Stadium: Uthai Thani Province Stadium

== Team statistics ==
=== Appearances and goals ===
As of 27 May 2025

No.	Pos.	Player	League 1		FA Cup		League Cup		ASEAN Club Championship		Singapore Cup		Total	
No.	Pos.	Player	Apps.	Goals	Apps.	Goals	Apps.	Goals	Apps.	Goals	Apps.	Goals	Apps.	Goals
1	GK	(South Korea) Jung Hyeon-ho	0	0	0	0	0	0	0	0	2	0	2	0
2	DF	(Thailand) Sanchai Nontasila	19+3	1	2+1	0	1	0	2+4	1	2	0	34	2
5	MF	(Thailand) Kritsada Kaman	25+3	1	4+1	0	2	0	3+4	0	2	0	44	1
6	MF	(Thailand) Sarach Yooyen	15	0	3	0	1	0	1+1	0	1+1	0	23	0
8	MF	(Thailand) Airfan Doloh	6+7	1	1+2	0	1	0	4+2	0	2+2	1	27	2
9	FW	(Thailand) Surachat Sareepim	2+5	2	1+1	0	1	0	1+2	0	0+1	0	14	2
10	FW	(Thailand) Teerasil Dangda	6+9	3	0+1	0	0	0	1	1	0	0	17	4
11	FW	(Thailand) (Sweden) Patrik Gustavsson	7+2	2	0	0	0+1	0	0	0	1	1	11	3
13	DF	(Thailand) (Italy) Marco Ballini	14+1	0	4	2	2	0	5+1	1	3	1	30	4
14	FW	(Costa Rica) Freddy Álvarez	9+10	2	1+2	0	0+1	0	5	1	2+1	0	31	3
15	MF	(Japan) Kodai Tanaka	0	0	2+1	0	0	0	0	0	5	1	8	1
16	DF	(Georgia (country)) Nika Sandokhadze	6+3	0	1	0	0	0	1	0	0	0	11	0
17	MF	(Japan) Gakuto Notsuda	23+4	3	2	0	1	0	3+1	1	0	0	34	4
18	MF	(Thailand) Chanathip Songkrasin	21+5	4	1+1	0	2	1	4+3	0	1	0	38	5
20	DF	(South Korea) Hwang Myung-hyun	5+3	1	0	0	0	0	1	0	6	1	15	2
22	FW	(Thailand) Chananan Pombuppha	1+9	0	0+2	1	1	1	1+1	0	4+1	0	20	2
23	DF	(Thailand) Santipharp Chan-ngom	10+4	0	2+2	0	0+1	0	2+3	0	2+1	0	27	0
24	MF	(Thailand) Kanokpon Buspakom	1+1	0	1+1	1	0	0	1	0	4	0	9	1
26	DF	(Thailand) Thanet Suknate	0	0	0+1	0	0	0	0	0	3+1	1	5	1
28	GK	(Thailand) Saranon Anuin	21	0	3	0	1	0	4	0	4	0	33	0
29	DF	(Thailand) Warinthon Jamnongwat	8+7	0	3+2	1	1+1	1	3+2	0	0	0	27	2
34	MF	(Thailand) Wachirawut Saenchek	0	0	0	0	0	0	0	0	1+1	0	2	0
38	GK	(Thailand) Nattapong Khajohnmalee	0+1	0	0	0	0	0	0	0	0	0	1	0
39	MF	(Thailand) Thanakorn Papaphe	0	0	0	0	0	0	0	0	0+2	0	2	0
45	FW	(Thailand) Nattawut Suksum	1+2	0	1	0	0+1	1	1+3	2	4+1	1	14	4
47	DF	(Thailand) Nuttawut Wongsawang	0	0	1+1	1	0	0	0	0	1+1	0	4	1
49	DF	(Thailand) Khatawut Poladao	0	0	0+1	0	0	0	0	0	2+1	0	4	0
50	MF	(Thailand) Teerapat Pruetong	1+5	1	1+2	0	1	0	0+1	0	6	0	17	1
54	FW	(Thailand) Kongnat Thuamthongdee	0	0	0	0	0	0	0	0	0+3	0	3	0
59	MF	(Thailand) Anan Samaae	0	0	0	0	0	0	0	0	0+1	0	1	0
69	DF	(France) (Niger) Seydine N'Diaye	3+1	0	1	0	0	0	2	0	4	2	11	2
75	FW	(Brazil) Raniel	21+5	10	3	2	1	1	5+1	4	0	0	36	17
78	DF	(France) (Senegal) Christian Gomis	24+3	2	4	0	2	1	6	0	0	0	39	3
81	DF	(Thailand) Waris Choolthong	19+3	2	3+1	0	1	0	5+1	0	2+1	0	36	2
85	GK	(Thailand) Issarapong Waewdee	0	0	0	0	0	0	0	0	0	0	0	0
91	FW	(Singapore) (South Africa) Ilhan Fandi	3+13	2	3+1	3	1+1	0	3+2	2	1+2	0	30	7
93	GK	(Thailand) Pisan Dorkmaikaew	9	0	2	0	1	0	3	0	0	0	15	0
99	FW	(Singapore) (South Africa) Ikhsan Fandi	3+9	2	1+1	1	0	0	3	0	1+3	0	21	3
Players who have played this season and/or sign for the season but had left the club on loan to other club
3	DF	(Thailand) Shinnaphat Leeaoh	15	2	1	0	1	0	1	0	0	0	18	2
4	MF	(Thailand) Chaowat Veerachat	4+4	0	1	0	0+1	0	1	0	0	0	11	0
19	DF	(Thailand) Thanadol Kaosaart	0+1	0	0	0	0	0	0	0	0	0	1	0
24	MF	(Thailand) Jaroensak Wonggorn	9+2	2	1	0	0	0	0+1	0	0	0	13	2
31	MF	(Thailand) Thawatchai Inprakhon	2+5	0	0	0	0	0	1	0	0	0	8	0
55	DF	(Thailand) Chonnapat Buaphan	4+3	0	0+1	0	0+1	0	1+1	0	0	0	11	0
77	MF	(Thailand) Sivakorn Tiatrakul	2+6	0	1	0	0+1	0	1+1	0	0	0	12	0
90	FW	(Uganda) (Germany) (England) Melvyn Lorenzen	10+3	2	0	0	0	0	0	0	0	0	13	2
Players who have played this season and/or sign for the season but had left the club permanently
7	FW	(South Africa) (Netherlands) Lars Veldwijk	0	0	0	0	0	0	0	0	0	0	0	0
11	FW	(Uzbekistan) Igor Sergeyev	0	0	0	0	0	0	0	0	0	0	0	0

== Competitions ==
=== Thai League 1 ===
==== Matches ====
Win Draw Loss

10 August 2024 1	Sukhothai	1–3	BG Pathum United	Sukhothai
	John Baggio 28'; Hikaru Matsui (yellow card) 42'; Abdulhafiz Bueraheng (yellow card) 58'; Thirayu Banhan (yellow card) 60'		Melvyn Lorenzen 32'; Jaroensak Wonggorn 40'; Chanathip Songkrasin 78'	Stadium: Thalay Luang Stadium; Attendance: 5,037; Referee: Paisan Bendem-Alee

17 August 2024 2	BG Pathum United	0–1	Rayong	Pathum Thani
	Christian Gomis (yellow card) 14'		Stênio Júnior 45+4' (pen.); Yashir Pinto (yellow card) 77'; Korrakot Pipatnadda (yellow card) 81'	Stadium: BG Stadium; Attendance: 7,870; Referee: Torphong Somsing

24 August 2024 3	Ratchaburi	4–1	BG Pathum United	Ratchaburi
	Tatsuya Tanaka 1'; Tana 18'; Clément Depres 42'; Mohamed Mara 62'; Kritsananon Srisuwan (yellow card) 52'		Shinnaphat Leeaoh 55'; Saranon Anuin (red card) 14'; Waris Choolthong (yellow card) 53'; Chanathip Songkrasin (yellow card) 56'	Stadium: Dragon Solar Park; Attendance: 4,675; Referee: Sahapop Sriboonlue

28 August 2024 4	BG Pathum United	2–0	Singha Chiangrai United	Pathum Thani
	Melvyn Lorenzen 21'; Gakuto Notsuda 26'; Chanathip Songkrasin (yellow card) 64'		Ralph (yellow card) 31'; Sittichok Kannoo (yellow card) 42'; Settasit Suvannaseat (yellow card) 69'	Stadium: BG Stadium; Attendance: 6,704; Referee: Sarayut Jakngoen

1 September 2024 5 (Rescheduled)	Khonkaen United	0–3	BG Pathum United	Khon Kaen
	Wasan Homsan (yellow card) 75'; Phanuphong Phonsa (yellow card) 79'		Raniel 24'; Teerasil Dangda 66'; Christian Gomis 90'; Sanchai Nontasila (yellow card) 42'; Marco Ballini (yellow card) 77'	Stadium: Khon Kaen Stadium; Attendance: 6,237; Referee: Warintron Sassadee

14 September 2024 6	BG Pathum United	1–1	Nongbua Pitchaya	Pathum Thani
	Teerasil Dangda 49'; Thawatchai Inprakhon (yellow card) 42'; Waris Choolthong (yellow card) 88'		Weerayut Sriwichai 70'; Weerayut Sriwichai (yellow card) 29'; Kittikun Jamsuwan (yellow card) 79'; Jorge Fellipe (yellow card) 90'	Stadium: BG Stadium; Attendance: 7,212; Referee: Songkran Bunmeekiart

22 September 2024 7 (Rescheduled)	Port	1–2	BG Pathum United	Bangkok
	Willen 90+2'		Freddy Álvarez 14'; Chanathip Songkrasin 56'; Melvyn Lorenzen (yellow card) 59'; Christian Gomis (yellow card) 73'; Saranon Anuin (yellow card) 90+5'	Stadium: PAT Stadium; Attendance: 6,250; Referee: Woottipong Ketkam

29 December 2024 8 (Rescheduled)	BG Pathum United	0–2	Buriram United	Pathum Thani
	Christian Gomis (yellow card) 38'; Waris Choolthong (yellow card) 45'		Chrigor 73' (yellow card) 71'; Lucas Crispim 77' (yellow card) 77'; Sasalak Haiprakhon (yellow card) 54'	Stadium: BG Stadium; Attendance: 11,469; Referee: Torphong Somsing

5 October 2024 9 (Rescheduled)	PT Prachuap	2–2	BG Pathum United	Prachuap Khiri Khan
	Jeong Woo-geun 82' (pen.); Phanthamit Praphanth 90+9'; Barros Tardeli (yellow card) 59'; Kanarin Thawornsak (yellow card) 71'; Phanthamit Praphanth (yellow card) 90+10'		Waris Choolthong 29'; Gakuto Notsuda 59'; Christian Gomis (yellow card) 12'; Warinthon Jamnongwat (yellow card) 83'; Jaroensak Wonggorn (yellow card) 90+2'; Saranon Anuin (yellow card) 90+7'	Stadium: Sam Ao Stadium; Attendance: 3,568; Referee: Natee Choosuwan

19 October 2024 10 (Rescheduled)	Muangthong United	1–1	BG Pathum United	Nonthaburi
	Poramet Arjvirai 50'; Kakana Khamyok (yellow card) 53'; Tristan Do (yellow card) 54'		Raniel 23'; Kritsada Kaman (yellow card) 78'; Marco Ballini (yellow card) 85'	Stadium: Thunderdome Stadium; Attendance: 8,209; Referee: Winat Phophat

26 October 2024 11 (Rescheduled)	BG Pathum United	3–1	Nakhon Pathom United	Pathum Thani
	Shinnaphat Leeaoh 27'; Airfan Doloh 66'; Freddy Álvarez 90+1'; Jaroensak Wonggorn (yellow card) 87'		Taku Ito 45+4' (pen.); Nopphakao Prachobklang (yellow card) 56'	Stadium: BG Stadium; Attendance: 7,045; Referee: Paisan Bendem-Alee

4 November 2024 12 (Rescheduled)	Lamphun Warriors	2–2	BG Pathum United	Lamphun
	Todsapol Lated 13'; Jefferson Assis 81'; Korraphat Nareechan (yellow card) 29'; Kike Linares (yellow card) 40'		Teerasil Dangda 35' (pen.); Ilhan Fandi 63'	Stadium: Lamphun Province Stadium; Attendance: 3,510; Referee: Songkran Bunmeekiart

9 November 2024 13 (Rescheduled)	BG Pathum United	2–1	Uthai Thani	Pathum Thani
	Chanathip Songkrasin 18'; Jaroensak Wonggorn 35' (penalty missed) 90+2; (yellow card) 31'; Sivakorn Tiatrakul (yellow card) 84'		Ricardo Santos 54'; Lucas Dias (yellow card) 45+1'; Wattana Playnum (yellow card) 63'	Stadium: BG Stadium; Attendance: 7,793; Referee: Phairot Bunkamnoed

24 November 2024 14 (Rescheduled)	Nakhon Ratchasima Mazda	1–0	BG Pathum United	Nakhon Ratchasima
	Nattanan Biesamrit 84'; Lee Jong-Cheon (yellow card) 28'; Anurak Mungdee (yellow card) 87'; Tanachai Noorach (yellow card) 90+7'; Watcharin Nueangprakaew (yellow card) 90+8'		Chaowat Veerachat (yellow card) 30'; Kritsada Kaman (yellow card) 87'	Stadium: 80th Birthday Stadium; Attendance: 10,121; Referee: Peerasan Krataithong

1 December 2024 15 (Rescheduled)	BG Pathum United	1–0	True Bangkok United	Pathum Thani
	Ikhsan Fandi 90+4' (yellow card) 90'		Muhsen Al-Ghassani (yellow card) 53'	Stadium: BG Stadium; Attendance: 10,180; Referee: Sivakorn Pu-udom

12 January 2025 16 (Rescheduled)	Rayong	1–1	BG Pathum United	Rayong
	Amani Aguinaldo 87'; Wasusiwakit Phusirit (yellow card) 25'; Korrakot Pipatnadda (yellow card) 90+10'		Hwang Myung-hyun 48'; Kritsada Kaman (yellow card) 15'; Santipharp Chan-ngom (yellow card) 85'	Stadium: Rayong Province Stadium; Attendance: 4,586; Referee: Panumas Phansamo

15 January 2025 17 (Rescheduled)	BG Pathum United	1–2	Ratchaburi	Pathum Thani
	Raniel 69'		Tana 63'; Jakkaphan Kaewprom 67'; Gabriel Mutombo Kupa (yellow card) 48'; Kritsananon Srisuwan (yellow card) 82'	Stadium: BG Stadium; Attendance: 6,765; Referee: Chaikrit Inboonsong

18 January 2025 18	Chiangrai United	1–0	BG Pathum United	Chiang Rai
	Sittichok Kannoo 38'		Christian Gomis (yellow card) 56'; Hwang Myung-hyun (yellow card) 71'; Sarach Yooyen (yellow card) 74'; Chanathip Songkrasin (yellow card) 90+6'	Stadium: Singha Chiangrai Stadium; Referee: Veeraporn Maophaeo

26 January 2025 19 (Rescheduled)	BG Pathum United	4–1	Khonkaen United	Pathum Thani
	Patrik Gustavsson 42'; Surachat Sareepim 72'; Chatchai Chiakklang 79' (o.g.); Chanathip Songkrasin 89'; Waris Choolthong (yellow card) 9'; Pisan Dorkmaikaew (yellow card) 50'		Tinnakorn Asurin 62'; Lossémy Karaboué (penalty missed) 9; Chatchai Chiakklang (yellow card) 78'	Stadium: BG Stadium; Attendance: 6,807; Referee: Natee Choosuwan

1 February 2025 20 (Rescheduled)	Nongbua Pitchaya	1–1	BG Pathum United	Nongbua
	Paulo Conrado 67' (pen.); Jorge Fellipe (yellow card) 70'		Patrik Gustavsson 27' (yellow card) 55'; Gakuto Notsuda (yellow card) 35'	Stadium: Pitchaya Stadium; Attendance: 5,293; Referee: Songkran Bunmeekiart

9 February 2025 21 (Rescheduled)	BG Pathum United	1–0	Port	Pathum Thani
	Surachat Sareepim 37' (yellow card) 25'; Patrik Gustavsson (yellow card) 47'; Marco Ballini (yellow card) 85'		Chalermsak Aukkee (yellow card) 74'; Noboru Shimura (yellow card) 75'	Stadium: BG Stadium; Attendance: 10,425; Referee: Noppadet Mangngam

12 April 2025 22 (Rescheduled)	Buriram United	1–2	BG Pathum United	Buriram
	Suphanat Mueanta 42'; Kim Min-hyeok (yellow card) 60'; Dion Cools (yellow card) 90+4'		Sanchai Nontasila 10'; Kritsada Kaman 79'; Warinthon Jamnongwat (yellow card) 78'	Stadium: Chang Arena; Attendance: 15,111; Referee: Warintorn Sassadee

22 February 2025 23	BG Pathum United	1–0	PT Prachuap	Pathum Thani
	Raniel 30'		Chrigor (yellow card) 84'	Stadium: BG Stadium; Attendance: 6,904; Referee: Wiwat Jumpaoon

1 March 2025 24 (Rescheduled)	BG Pathum United	2–0	Muangthong United	Pathum Thani
	Raniel 45', 66'; Christian Gomis (yellow card) 69'		Poramet Arjvirai (yellow card) 61'	Stadium: BG Stadium; Attendance: 10,366; Referee: Niwat Insa-ard

8 March 2025 25	Nakhon Pathom United	1–4	BG Pathum United	Nakhon Ratchasima
	Waris Choolthong 84' (o.g.); Ahmed Shamsaldin (yellow card) 27'		Raniel 44', 71' (pen.); Ilhan Fandi 80'; Teerapat Pruetong 90+7'; Waris Choolthong (yellow card) 45+1'	Stadium: 80th Birthday Stadium; Attendance: 1,996; Referee: Sapuding Kalong

14 March 2025 26 (Rescheduled)	BG Pathum United	1–0	Lamphun Warriors	Pathum Thani
	Christian Gomis 48' (yellow card) 66'; Warinthon Jamnongwat (yellow card) 31'		Todsapol Lated (yellow card) 20'; Thossaporn Chuchin (red card) 90+3'; Witthaya Moonwong (yellow card) 90+5'	Stadium: BG Stadium; Attendance: 6,729; Referee: Songkran Bunmeekiart

29 March 2025 27 (Rescheduled)	Uthai Thani	1–1	BG Pathum United	Uthai Thani
	Chakkit Laptrakul 90+6'; Sirimongkol Rattanapoom (yellow card) 88'		Raniel 42'; Sarach Yooyen (yellow card) 34'; Sanchai Nontasila (yellow card) 68'; Warinthon Jamnongwat (yellow card) 90+4'	Stadium: Uthai Thani Province Stadium; Attendance: 4,525; Referee: Phadoongkiat Piangdee

6 April 2025 28 (Rescheduled)	BG Pathum United	1–0	Nakhon Ratchasima Mazda	Pathum Thani
	Raniel 73'; Sanchai Nontasila (yellow card) 42'; Sarach Yooyen (yellow card) 82'		Watcharin Nueangprakaew (red card) 36'; Dennis Murillo (yellow card) 58' (red card) 90'; Weerawat Jiraphaksiri (yellow card) 68'	Stadium: BG Stadium; Attendance: 8,244; Referee: Phadoongkiat Piangdee

19 April 2025 29	True Bangkok United	3–0	BG Pathum United	Pathum Thani
	Luka Adžić 34'; Muhsen Al-Ghassani 69' (pen.); Thitiphan Puangchan 90+6'		Kritsada Kaman (yellow card) 79'; Waris Choolthong (yellow card) 90+5'	Stadium: Thammasat Stadium; Attendance: 4,076; Referee: Wiwat Jumpaoon

27 April 2025 30	BG Pathum United	4–4	Sukhothai	Pathum Thani
	Gakuto Notsuda 2'; Raniel 22' (pen.); Ikhsan Fandi 42'; Waris Choolthong 44'; Ilhan Fandi (yellow card) 34'; Marco Ballini (yellow card) 82'		Matheus Fornazari 45+4', 55', 90+4' (yellow card) 90+6'; Eito Ishimoto 90+2'; Surawich Logarwit (yellow card) 16'; Sarawut Kanlayanabandit (yellow card) 20'; Surawich Logarwit (yellow card) 16'	Stadium: BG Stadium; Referee: Sivakorn Pu-udom

Pos	Team	Pld	W	D	L	GF	GA	GD	Pts	Qualification
1	Buriram United (C)	30	22	4	4	92	20	+72	70	Qualification for AFC Champions League Elite League stage and ASEAN Club Championship group stage
2	Bangkok United	30	21	6	3	63	30	+33	69	Qualification for AFC Champions League Elite qualifiers and ASEAN Club Championship group stage
3	BG Pathum United	30	15	8	7	47	34	+13	53	Qualification for AFC Champions League Two group stage and ASEAN Club Championship group stage
4	Ratchaburi	30	15	7	8	65	47	+18	52	Qualification for AFC Champions League Two group stage
5	Port	30	13	9	8	52	39	+13	48	

Source: Thai League
Rules for classification: Season in progress: 1) Points; 2) Goal difference; 3) Goals scored; End of season: 1) Points; 2) Head-to-head points; 3) Head-to-head goal difference; 4) Goals scored.
(C) Champions

=== Thai FA Cup ===
20 November 2024 Round of 64	Port	1–2	BG Pathum United	Bangkok
	Lonsana Doumbouya 60'; Isaac Honny (yellow card) 26'; Peeradon Chamratsamee (yellow card) 67'		Raniel 31'; Ilhan Fandi 78'; Teerasil Dangda (yellow card) 76'; Christian Gomis (yellow card) 89'	Stadium: PAT Stadium; Attendance: 4,389; Referee: Niwat Insa-ard

29 January 2025 Round of 32	(T3) Lopburi City	0–3	BG Pathum United	Lopburi
			Marco Ballini 15'; Ilhan Fandi 35'; Kanokpon Buspakom 78'	Stadium: Lopburi Stadium; Attendance: 3,825; Referee: Natee Choosuwan

9 April 2025 Round of 16	(T3) Surin City	1–4	BG Pathum United	Surin
	Kroekrit Rodmueang 90'; Arttapon Sopa (yellow card) 57'		Nuttawut Wongsawang 18'; Warinthon Jamnongwat 20'; Ikhsan Fandi 64'; Chananan Pombuppha 70'; Kanokpon Buspakom (yellow card) 81'; Airfan Doloh (yellow card) 83'	Stadium: Sri Narong Stadium; Attendance: 4,700; Referee: Noppadet Mangngam

23 April 2025 Quarter Final	Nakhon Ratchasima Mazda	1–3	BG Pathum United	Nakhon Ratchasima
	Dennis Murillo 63'		Marco Ballini 16'; Ilhan Fandi 45+2'; Raniel 81' (pen.)	Stadium: 80th Birthday Stadium; Attendance: 5,632; Referee: Songkran Bunmeekiart

10 May 2025 Semi Final	Buriram United	3–0	BG Pathum United	Ratchaburi
	Jefferson Tabinas 47'; Goran Čaušić 54'; Supachai Chaided 75'		Dion Cools (yellow card) 42'	Stadium: Dragon Solar Park; Attendance: 4,484; Referee: Choi Hyun-Jae (South Korea)

=== Thai League Cup ===
30 October 2024 Round of 32	(T2) Bangkok	0–5	BG Pathum United	Bangkok
	Padungsak Phothinak (yellow card) 65'; Witchaya Pornprasart (yellow card) 83'		Chananan Pombuppha 17'; Chanathip Songkrasin 21'; Christian Gomis 34'; Nattawut Suksum 88'; Warinthon Jamnongwat 90+1'; Airfan Dolah (yellow card) 74'	Stadium: 72nd Anniversary Stadium; Attendance: 1,237; Referee: Wiwat Jumpaoon

26 February 2025 Round of 16	Buriram United	3–1	BG Pathum United	Buriram
	Martin Boakye 32'; Supachai Chaided 46'; Guilherme Bissoli 84' (pen.); Lucas Crispim (yellow card) 45+2'; Suphanat Mueanta (yellow card) 55'		Raniel 75' (yellow card) 83'; Marco Ballini (yellow card) 9'	Stadium: Chang Arena; Attendance: 16,126; Referee: Sarayut Jakngoen

=== ASEAN Club Championship ===
==== Group stage ====
Pos	Team	Pld	W	D	L	GF	GA	GD	Pts	Qualification	BGP	PSM	PKS	TNG	DOA	SHU
1	(Thailand) BG Pathum United	5	3	2	0	11	6	+5	11	Advance to Semi-finals			2–1	4–3	1–1	
2	(Indonesia) PSM Makassar	5	3	1	1	8	4	+4	10	Advance to Semi-finals	0–0				3–0	4–3
3	(Cambodia) Preah Khan Reach Svay Rieng	5	2	1	2	8	7	+1	7 (Note: Ranked on head-to-head points: Preah Khan Reach Svay Rieng (3); Terengganu (0).)			0–1				4–2
4	(Malaysia) Terengganu	5	2	1	2	13	9	+4	7			1–0	2–3		2–2	
5	(Vietnam) Dong A Thanh Hoa	5	1	3	1	6	7	−1	6				0–0			3–1
6	(Myanmar) Shan United	5	0	0	5	7	20	−13	0		1–4			0–5		

Source: ASEAN United FC
Rules for classification: Tiebreakers
Notes:

21 August 2024 Matchday 1	PSM Makassar (Indonesia)	0–0	(Thailand) BG Pathum United	Balikpapan, Indonesia
	Ricky Pratama (yellow card) 78'; Syahrul Lasinari (yellow card) 90'	Report		Stadium: Batakan Stadium; Referee: Koji Takasaki (Japan)

25 September 2024 Matchday 2	BG Pathum United (Thailand)	2–1	(Cambodia) PKR Svay Rieng	Pathum Thani
	Raniel 31'; Teerasil Dangda 63'; Seydine N'Diaye (yellow card) 19'	Report	Pablo 61'; Cristian (yellow card) 47'; Nick Taylor (yellow card) 71'	Stadium: BG Stadium; Referee: Faisal Alblwi (Saudi Arabia)

8 January 2025 Matchday 3	BG Pathum United (Thailand)	1–1	(Vietnam) Đông Á Thanh Hóa	Pathum Thani
	Sanchai Nontasila 88'; Ilhan Fandi (yellow card) 90+3'	Report	Doãn Ngọc Tân 70'; A Mít (yellow card) 72'; Lê Văn Thắng (yellow card) 75'; Hà Châu Phi (yellow card) 90+1'; Đinh Viết Tú (yellow card) 90+3'	Stadium: BG Stadium; Referee: Akobirxuja Shukurullaev (Uzbekistan)

22 January 2025 Matchday 4	Shan United (Myanmar)	1–4	(Thailand) BG Pathum United	Yangon
	Moussa Bakayoko 30'; Mark Sekyi (yellow card) 65'; William Biassi Nyakwe (yellow card) 82'	Report	Freddy Álvarez 63' (pen.); Raniel 80'; Nattawut Suksum 90+9', 90+12'	Stadium: Thuwunna Stadium; Referee: Kim Hee-Gon (South Korea)

5 February 2025 Matchday 5	BG Pathum United (Thailand)	4–3	(Malaysia) Terengganu	Pathum Thani
	Raniel 71', 76'; Gakuto Notsuda 83'; Ilhan Fandi 87' (yellow card) 90+1'; Warinthon Jamnongwat (yellow card) 24'; Christian Gomis (yellow card) 90+4'; Pisan Dorkmaikaew (yellow card) 90+7'	Report	Akhyar Rashid 66'; Safawi Rasid 90+3' 90+8' (pen.); Shahrul Nizam (yellow card) 86'	Stadium: BG Stadium; Referee: Ko Hyung-jin (South Korea)

==== Semi Final ====
2 April 2025 Leg 1	Buriram United (Thailand)	3–1	(Thailand) BG Pathum United	Buriram
	Supachai Chaided 24'; Pansa Hemviboon 57'; Guilherme Bissoli 74'; Phitiwat Sukjitthammakul (yellow card) 28'; Dion Cools (yellow card) 90+3'	Report	Ilhan Fandi 54'	Stadium: Buriram City Stadium; Referee: Choi Hyun-Jae (South Korea)

7 May 2025 Leg 2	BG Pathum United (Thailand)	0–0 (1–3 agg.)	(Thailand) Buriram United	Pathum Thani
	Kritsada Kaman (yellow card) 80'	Report	Peter Žulj (yellow card) 78'	Stadium: BG Stadium; Referee: Hiroki Kasahara (Japan)

=== Singapore Cup ===
Pos	Team	Pld	W	D	L	GF	GA	GD	Pts	Qualification
1	Lion City Sailors	4	3	1	0	12	4	+8	10	Semi-finals
2	BG Pathum United	4	2	2	0	7	5	+2	8	Semi-finals
3	Balestier Khalsa	4	2	0	2	10	10	0	6	
4	Tanjong Pagar United	4	1	0	3	3	9	−6	3	
5	Geylang International	4	0	1	3	7	11	−4	1	

Source: FAS

Win Draw Loss

2 February 2025 Group Match 1	Tanjong Pagar United (Singapore)	1–2	(Thailand) BG Pathum United	Jurong East
	Salif Cissé 11'; Rezza Rezky (yellow card) 43'; Shodai Nishikawa (yellow card) 45'		Marco Ballini 22'; Hwang Myung-hyun 76'; Kanokpon Buspakom (yellow card) 53'	Stadium: Jurong East Stadium; Referee: Jansen Foo

16 February 2025 Group Match 2	BG Pathum United (Thailand)	2–2	(Singapore) Geylang International	Jalan Besar
	Naqiuddin Eunos 35' (o.g.); Airfan Doloh 38'; Marco Ballini (yellow card) 45+4'; Ikhsan Fandi (penalty missed) 85; Kanokpon Buspakom (yellow card) 90+8'		Tomoyuki Doi 5', 7' (penalty missed) 45+4 (yellow card) 74'; Huzaifah Aziz (yellow card) 14'	Stadium: Jalan Besar Stadium; Referee: Farhan Mohd

2 March 2025 Group Match 3	Balestier Khalsa (Singapore)	1–2	(Thailand) BG Pathum United	Bishan
	Anton Fase 9'; Kodai Tanaka (penalty missed) 87; Jared Gallagher (yellow card) 67'		Patrik Gustavsson 15'; Nattawut Suksum 45+1' (penalty missed) 45+1; Nuttawut Wongsawang (red card) 25'; Teerapat Pruetong (yellow card) 51'; Sanchai Nontasila (yellow card) 64'	Stadium: Bishan Stadium; Referee: Hilmi Fuad

30 March 2025 Group Match 4	BG Pathum United (Thailand)	1–1	(Singapore) Lion City Sailors	Jalan Besar
	Thanet Suknate 90+5'; Hwang Myung-hyun (yellow card) 22'		Song Ui-young (red card) 6'; Abdul Rasaq 35' (yellow card) 15'; Akram Azman (yellow card) 83'	Stadium: Jalan Besar Stadium; Referee: Jansen Foo

16 April 2025 Semi Final Leg 1	BG Pathum United (Thailand)	1–1	(Singapore) BG Tampines Rovers	Jalan Besar
	Shuya Yamashita 3'; Kyoga Nakamura (yellow card) 32'; Shah Shahiran (yellow card) 61'		Kodai Tanaka 35'; Kanokpon Buspakom (yellow card) 62'; Hwang Myung-hyun (yellow card) 72'; Airfan Doloh (yellow card) 77'	Stadium: Jalan Besar Stadium; Referee: Andrea Verolino

27 May 2025 Semi Final Leg 2	BG Tampines Rovers (Singapore)	3–2 (a.e.t.) (4–3 agg.)	(Thailand) BG Pathum United	Jalan Besar
	Glenn Kweh 16'; Seia Kunori 58'; Sarach Yooyen 114' (o.g.); Irfan Najeeb (yellow card) 42'; Taufik Suparno (yellow card) 120+5'		Seydine N'Diaye 41', 76'; Sanchai Nontasila (yellow card) 45'; Hwang Myung-hyun (yellow card) 85'; Sarach Yooyen (yellow card) 89'; Freddy Álvarez (yellow card) 95'; Ikhsan Fandi (yellow card) 120'; Airfan Doloh (yellow card) 120+2'	Stadium: Jalan Besar Stadium; Referee: Ahmad A'Qashah
