= 2023–24 BG Pathum United F.C. season =

Association football season

BG Pathum United
2023–24 season
- Chairman: Pavin Bhirombhakdi
- Manager: Thongchai Sukkoki (until 24 December 2023); Makoto Teguramori
- Stadium: BG Stadium, Thanyaburi, Pathum Thani, Thailand
- Thai League 1: 4th
- FA Cup: Round of 32
- League Cup: Finals
- 2023–24 ACL: Group stage
- Top goalscorer: League: Igor Sergeev (5 goals); All: Igor Sergeev (11 goals)

The 2023–24 season is BG Pathum United's fourth consecutive season in Thai League 1, following promotion in 2019.

In addition to the domestic league, the club will also compete in this season's editions of the Thai FA Cup and the AFC Champions League.

== Squad ==
As of 10 May 2023.

Squad No.	Name	Nationality	Date of birth (age)	Previous club	Contract Till
Goalkeepers
26	Kittipong Phuthawchueak	(Thailand)	26 September 1989 (age 36)	(Thailand) Police Tero	2024
32	Supanai Juntrapasit	(Thailand)	1 April 2004 (age 22)	Youth Team	2024
49	Nalawich Intacharoen	(Thailand)	11 November 2003 (age 22)	(Thailand) Chiangmai F.C.	2024
85	Issarapong Waewdee	(Thailand)	1 October 2004 (age 21)	(Thailand) Debsirin School	
93	Pisan Dorkmaikaew	(Thailand)	10 May 1984 (age 42)	(Thailand) PT Prachuap	2025
	Rattanachat Niamthaisong	(Thailand)	21 May 2001 (age 25)	(Thailand) Chanthaburi F.C.	2025
Defenders
3	Shinnaphat Leeaoh	(Thailand)	2 February 1997 (age 29)	(Thailand) Chiangrai United	2024
5	Victor Cardozo	(Brazil)	19 December 1989 (age 36)	(Thailand) Chiangrai United	2024
15	Apisit Sorada	(Thailand)	28 February 1997 (age 29)	(Thailand) Chiangmai F.C.	2024
16	Jakkapan Praisuwan	(Thailand)	16 August 1994 (age 31)	(Thailand) Samut Prakan City F.C.	2024
17	Irfan Fandi	(Singapore) (South Africa)	13 August 1997 (age 28)	(Singapore) Young Lions FC	2026
23	Santipharp Chan-ngom	(Thailand)	23 September 1996 (age 29)	(Thailand) Police Tero	2026
24	Ryhan Stewart	(Singapore) (Wales)	15 February 2000 (age 26)	(Thailand) Chiangmai F.C.	2024
33	Wattanakorn Sawatlakhorn	(Thailand)	23 May 1998 (age 28)	(Thailand) Muangthong United	2024
54	Saranyawat Naprasert	(Thailand)	3 April 2006 (age 20)	Youth Team	2024
55	Chonnapat Buaphan	(Thailand)	22 March 2004 (age 22)	(Thailand) Lamphun Warriors	2024
69	Seydine N'Diaye	(France) (Niger)	23 April 1998 (age 28)	(Finland) Ilves	2024
81	Waris Choolthong	(Thailand)	8 January 2004 (age 22)	Youth Team	2024
Midfielders
2	Kritsada Kaman	(Thailand)	18 March 1999 (age 27)	(Thailand) Chonburi F.C.	2027
4	Chaowat Veerachat	(Thailand)	23 June 1996 (age 30)	(Japan) Cerezo Osaka	2025
6	Sarach Yooyen	(Thailand)	30 May 1992 (age 34)	(Thailand) Muangthong United	2026
14	Freddy Álvarez	(Costa Rica)	26 April 1995 (age 31)	(Albania) KF Shkupi	2024
18	Chanathip Songkrasin	(Thailand)	5 October 1993 (age 32)	(Japan) Kawasaki Frontale	2027
36	Phitiwat Sukjitthammakul	(Thailand)	1 February 1995 (age 31)	(Thailand) Chiangrai United	2024
48	Kanokpon Buspakom	(Thailand)	20 September 1999 (age 26)	(Thailand) Nakhon Ratchasima F.C.	2027
Strikers
7	Danilo Alves	(Brazil)	11 April 1991 (age 35)	(Thailand) Chonburi F.C.	2024
9	Surachat Sareepim	(Thailand)	24 October 1986 (age 39)	(Thailand) Police United F.C.	2024
10	Teerasil Dangda	(Thailand)	6 June 1988 (age 38)	(Japan) Shimizu S-Pulse	2025
11	Igor Sergeyev	(Uzbekistan)	30 April 1993 (age 33)	(Kazakhstan) FC Tobol	2024
19	Chenrop Samphaodi	(Thailand)	2 June 1995 (age 31)	(Thailand) Lamphun Warriors	2024
22	Chananan Pombuppha	(Thailand)	17 March 1992 (age 34)	(Thailand) Bangkok United	2024
27	Denis Bušnja	(Croatia)	14 April 2000 (age 26)	(Georgia (country)) FC Dinamo Tbilisi	2024
99	Ikhsan Fandi	(Singapore) (South Africa)	9 April 1999 (age 27)	(Norway) FK Jerv	2024
Players loaned out during season
1	Chatchai Budprom	(Thailand)	4 February 1987 (age 39)	(Thailand) Chiangrai United	2025
8	Chatmongkol Thongkiri	(Thailand)	5 May 1997 (age 29)	(Thailand) Muangthong United	2024
13	Tawan Khotrsupho (F)	(Thailand)	23 January 2000 (age 26)	(Thailand) Chiangmai F.C.	
19	Kiadtiphon Udom (G)	(Thailand)	26 June 2000 (age 26)	(Thailand) Chainat Hornbill F.C.	2024
31	Fahas Bilanglod (G)	(Thailand)	3 March 1999 (age 27)	(Thailand) Chiangmai F.C.	2024
34	Sarawut Koedsri (D)	(Thailand)	29 April 1989 (age 37)	(Thailand) Chiangmai F.C.	2024
48	Thitipat Ekarunpong (F)	(Thailand)	5 January 2005 (age 21)	(Thailand) Police Tero U18	
58	Nattaphon Worasut	(Thailand)	19 January 1997 (age 29)	(Thailand) Nakhon Ratchasima F.C.	2024
77	Patrik Gustavsson	(Thailand) (Sweden)	19 April 2001 (age 25)	(Thailand) Chiangmai F.C.	2025
97	Phongrawit Jantawong (F)	(Thailand)	7 October 2000 (age 25)	(Thailand) Chiangrai United F.C.	2024
	Adisak Sosungnoen (D)	(Thailand)	13 March 1996 (age 30)	(Thailand) Khon Kaen United F.C.	2024
	Chitchanok Xaysensourinthone (F)	(Thailand) (Switzerland)	23 August 1994 (age 31)	(Thailand) Chiangmai F.C.	2024
	Supasak Sarapee (D)	(Thailand)	5 April 2000 (age 26)	(Thailand) Chiangrai United F.C.	2024
	Veljko Filipović (D)	(Serbia)	11 October 1999 (age 26)	(Thailand) Chiangrai United F.C.	2024
82	Supasan Arjrod (F)	(Thailand)	14 August 2003 (age 22)	Youth Team	2024
	Sirachat Krasaethong (D)	(Thailand)	3 January 2002 (age 24)	(Thailand) Phitsanulok F.C.	2024
	Harhys Stewart	(Singapore) (Wales)	20 March 2001 (age 25)	(Singapore) Young Lions FC	2025
Players left during season
13	Renato Kelić	(Croatia)	31 March 1991 (age 35)	(Thailand) Chonburi F.C.	2024

== Coaching staff ==
The following list displays the coaching staff of all the BG Pathum United current football sections:

First Team

Position	Name
Chairman	Pavin Bhirombhakdi
Head Coach	(Japan) Makoto Teguramori
Asst. Coach	(Japan) Hiroaki Nagashima; Natipong Sritong-In; Chatree Chimtale; Peerapong Pichitchotirat; Amnart Kaewkhew
Goalkeeper Coach	(Brazil) Marquinhos Domingues
Interpreter	Hasdin Sukkoki
Doctor	Pakapon Issaragrisil
Physiotherapist	Yongsak Lertdamrongkiet; Saranyoo Kheawlek; Chalotorn Chaisiri
Fitness Trainer	(Brazil) Anderson Nicolau; Auttapon Boonsan
Nutritionist	Thanatpong Sukwong

== Transfer ==
=== In ===
Pre-Season

Position	Player	Transferred from	Ref
GK	(Thailand) Nalawich Intacharoen	(Thailand) Chiangmai F.C.	Free
DF	(Singapore) (Wales) Ryhan Stewart	(Thailand) Chiangmai F.C.	Free
DF	(Thailand) Shinnaphat Leeaoh	(Thailand) Chiangrai United F.C.	Free
DF	(Croatia) Renato Kelić	(Thailand) Chonburi F.C.	Free
MF	(Thailand) Suchanon Malison	(Thailand) Chiangmai F.C.	Free
MF	(Thailand) Chanathip Songkrasin	(Japan) Kawasaki Frontale	฿70m / US$2,000,000
MF	(Costa Rica) Freddy Álvarez	(Albania) KF Shkupi	Free
FW	(Brazil) Danilo Alves	(Thailand) Chonburi F.C.	Free
FW	(Uzbekistan) Igor Sergeyev	(Kazakhstan) FC Tobol	Free

Note 1:

Mid-Season

Position	Player	Transferred from	Ref
GK	(Thailand) Pisan Dorkmaikaew	(Thailand) PT Prachuap F.C.	Free
DF	(Thailand) Kritsada Kaman	(Thailand) Chonburi F.C.	฿30m
DF	(France) Seydine N'Diaye	(Finland) Ilves	Undisclosed
DF	(Singapore) (Wales) Harhys Stewart	(Singapore) Young Lions FC	Free
FW	(Croatia) Denis Bušnja	(Georgia (country)) FC Dinamo Tbilisi	Free
FW	(Thailand) Chananan Pombuppha	(Thailand) Bangkok United	Free
DF	(Thailand) (Norway) Nicholas Mickelson	(Denmark) Odense Boldklub	Free

=== Out ===
Pre-Season

Position	Player	Transferred To	Ref
GK	(Thailand) Korraphat Nareechan	(Thailand) Lamphun Warriors	Free
GK	(Thailand) Prasit Padungchok	(Thailand) Pattaya United F.C.	Free
DF	(Thailand) Suwannapat Kingkaew	(Thailand) Chiangmai F.C.	Free
DF	(Thailand) Piyachanok Darit	(Thailand) Chiangmai F.C.	Free
DF	(Thailand) Thammayut Tonkham	(Thailand) Chiangmai F.C.	Free
DF	(Thailand) Ronnayod Mingmitwan	(Thailand) Chiangrai United F.C.	Free
DF	(Thailand) Athibordee Atirat	(Thailand) Chiangrai United F.C.	Free
DF	(Thailand) Suwit Paipromrat	(Thailand) Muangthong United	Free
DF	(Thailand) Saharat Pongsuwan	(Thailand) PT Prachuap F.C.	Undisclosed
DF	(Thailand) (Spain) Ernesto Phumipha	(Thailand) Police Tero	Free
DF	(Thailand) Chaiyapruek Chirachin	(Thailand) Dragon Kanchanaburi	Season loan
DF	(Brazil) Cássio Scheid	FC Ararat-Armenia	Free
DF	(Venezuela) Andrés Túñez	N.A.	Retired
DF	(Japan) Yusuke Maruhashi	(Japan) Cerezo Osaka	End of loan
DF	(Philippines) (Australia) Jesse Curran	(Thailand) Ratchaburi F.C.	Free
DF	(Thailand) Nakin Wisetchat	(Thailand) Port F.C.	Free
MF	(Thailand) Worachit Kanitsribampen	(Thailand) Port F.C.	US$585,000
MF	(Thailand) Pathompol Charoenrattanapirom	(Thailand) Port F.C.	US$585,000
MF	(Japan) Ryo Matsumura	(Indonesia) Persija Jakarta	Free
MF	(Thailand) Suchanon Malison	(Thailand) Chiangmai F.C.	Undisclosed
FW	(Brazil) Stênio Júnior	(Thailand) Chiangmai F.C.	Free
FW	(Israel) Lidor Cohen	(Thailand) Trat F.C.	Free
FW	(Israel) Ben Azubel	(Israel) Hapoel Jerusalem	Free
FW	(Thailand) Korawich Tasa	(Thailand) Ratchaburi F.C.	Free
FW	(Thailand) Siroch Chatthong	(Thailand) Lamphun Warriors	Free
FW	(Thailand) Thammayut Rakbun	(Thailand) MH Nakhon Si City	Free
FW	(Thailand) Chatree Chimtalay	N.A.	Retired

Note 1:

Mid-Season

Position	Player	Transferred To	Ref
DF	(Croatia) Renato Kelić	(Singapore) BG Tampines Rovers	Free

=== Loan In ===
Mid-Season

Position	Player	Transferred from	Ref

Note 1:

=== Loan Out ===
Pre-Season

Position	Player	Transferred To	Ref
GK	(Thailand) Kiadtiphon Udom	(Thailand) Chainat Hornbill F.C.	Season loan (Note: Kiadtiphon Udom loan was cut short as he moves to Nara Club of Japan)
GK	(Thailand) Fahas Bilanglod	(Thailand) Chiangmai F.C.	Season loan
DF	(Thailand) Sarawut Koedsri	(Thailand) Chiangmai F.C.	Season loan
DF	(Thailand) Supasak Sarapee	(Thailand) Chiangrai United F.C.	Season loan
DF	(Serbia) Veljko Filipović	(Thailand) Chiangrai United F.C.	Season loan
DF	(Thailand) Adisak Sosungnoen	(Thailand) Police Tero F.C.	Season loan
DF	(Thailand) Sirachat Krasaethong	(Thailand) Mae Chai Thanachotiwat	Season loan
DF	(Thailand) Saranyawat Naprasert	(Thailand) Suphanburi F.C.	Season loan
MF	(Thailand) Kanokpon Buspakom	(Thailand) Nakhon Pathom United	Season loan
FW	(Thailand) (Switzerland) Chitchanok Xaysensourinthone	(Thailand) Chiangmai F.C.	Season loan
FW	(Thailand) Tawan Khotrsupho	(Thailand) Chiangmai F.C.	Season loan
FW	(Thailand) Pongrawit Jantawong	(Thailand) Chiangrai United F.C.	Season loan
FW	(Thailand) Supasan Arjrod	(Thailand) Mae Chai Thanachotiwat	Season loan

Mid-Season

Position	Player	Transferred To	Ref
GK	(Thailand) Chatchai Budprom	(Thailand) PT Prachuap F.C.	Season loan
GK	(Thailand) Kiadtiphon Udom	(Japan) Nara Club (J3)	Season loan till December 2024
DF	(Singapore) (Wales) Harhys Stewart	(Thailand) Chiangrai United F.C.	Season loan
DF	(Thailand) Thanet Suknate	(Singapore) BG Tampines Rovers (S1)	Season loan till June 2025
MF	(Thailand) Chatmongkol Thongkiri	(Thailand) PT Prachuap F.C.	Season loan
MF	(Thailand) Nattaphon Worasut	(Thailand) Nakhon Pathom United	Season loan
FW	(Thailand) Thitipat Ekarunpong	(Singapore) BG Tampines Rovers (S1)	Season loan till June 2025
FW	(Thailand) (Sweden) Patrik Gustavsson	(Japan) Nara Club (J3)	Season loan till December 2024

=== Return from loan ===
Pre-Season

Position	Player	Transferred from	Ref
GK	(Thailand) Korraphat Nareechan	(Thailand) Police Tero F.C.	Loan return
GK	(Thailand) Chatchai Budprom	(Thailand) PT Prachuap F.C.	Loan return
GK	(Thailand) Rattanachat Niamthaisong	(Thailand) Chanthaburi F.C.	Loan return
GK	(Thailand) Kiadtiphon Udom	(Thailand) Chiangmai F.C.	Loan return
GK	(Thailand) Fahas Bilanglod	(Thailand) Chiangmai F.C.	Loan return
DF	(Serbia) Veljko Filipović	(Thailand) Chiangmai F.C.	Loan return
DF	(Thailand) Suwannapat Kingkaew	(Thailand) Chiangmai F.C.	Loan return
DF	(Thailand) Piyachanok Darit	(Thailand) Chiangmai F.C.	Loan return
DF	(Thailand) Supasak Sarapee	(Thailand) Chiangmai F.C.	Loan return
DF	(Thailand) Thammayut Tonkham	(Thailand) Chiangmai F.C.	Loan return
DF	(Thailand) Sarawut Koedsri	(Thailand) Chiangmai F.C.	Loan return
DF	(Thailand) Chaiyapruek Chirachin	(Thailand) Chiangmai F.C.	Loan return
DF	(Thailand) Ronnayod Mingmitwan	(Thailand) Chiangmai F.C.	Free
DF	(Thailand) Athibordee Atirat	(Thailand) Chiangrai United F.C.	Loan return
DF	(Brazil) Victor Cardozo	(Thailand) Chiangrai United F.C.	Loan return
DF	(Thailand) Saharat Pongsuwan	(Thailand) PT Prachuap F.C.	Loan return
DF	(Philippines) (Australia) Jesse Curran	(Thailand) Chonburi F.C.	Loan return
MF	(Thailand) Worachit Kanitsribampen	(Thailand) Port F.C.	Loan return
MF	(Thailand) Pathompol Charoenrattanapirom	(Thailand) Port F.C.	Loan return
MF	(Thailand) Kanokpon Buspakom	(Thailand) Nakhon Ratchasima	Loan return
FW	(Thailand) Siroch Chatthong	(Thailand) Nakhon Ratchasima	Loan return
FW	(Thailand) Chenrop Samphaodi	(Thailand) Lamphun Warriors	Loan return
FW	(Thailand) Tawan Khotrsupho	(Thailand) Chiangmai F.C.	Loan return
FW	(Thailand) Pongrawit Jantawong	(Thailand) Chiangmai F.C.	Loan return
FW	(Thailand) (Switzerland) Chitchanok Xaysensourinthone	(Thailand) Chiangmai F.C.	Loan return
FW	(Israel) Lidor Cohen	(Thailand) Khon Kaen United F.C.	Loan return

Note 1: Korraphat Nareechan, Suwannapat Kingkaew, Piyachanok Darit returned to the club after end of loan and were released from the club.

Note 2: Worachit Kanitsribampen loan ended but was made permanent by Port FC.

Note 3: Ronnayod Mingmitwan loan ended and moved on to join Chiangrai United.

Note 4: Fahas Bilanglod loan was extended for another season.

Mid-Season

Position	Player	Transferred from	Ref
MF	(Thailand) Kanokpon Buspakom	(Thailand) Nakhon Pathom United	Loan return

=== Extension / Retained ===
Position	Player	Ref
DF	(Thailand) Santipharp Chan-ngom	3 years extension till June 2026
DF	(Thailand) Sarach Yooyen	3 years extension till June 2026
FW	(Thailand) Teerasil Dangda	2 years extension till June 2025

=== Promoted ===
Position	Player	Ref
DF	(Thailand) Saranyawat Naprasert	
MF	(Thailand) Waris Choolthong	
FW	(Thailand) Supasan Arjrod	

== Friendlies ==
=== Pre-Season Friendly ===
Win Draw Loss

=== Mid-Season Friendly ===
Win Draw Loss

24 February 2024 J.League Asia Challenge	BG Pathum United	3-2	(Japan) Cerezo Osaka	Pathum Thani
				Stadium: BG Stadium

== Team statistics ==
=== Appearances and goals ===
As of 16 Jun 2024

No.	Pos.	Player	League 1		FA Cup		League Cup		AFC Champions League		Total	
No.	Pos.	Player	Apps.	Goals	Apps.	Goals	Apps.	Goals	Apps.	Goals	Apps.	Goals
2	MF	(Thailand) Kritsada Kaman	9+2	0	0	0	3+1	0	0	0	15	0
3	DF	(Thailand) Shinnaphat Leeaoh	13+4	1	2	0	3+1	1	3	0	26	2
4	MF	(Thailand) Chaowat Veerachat	10+8	1	1	0	4+1	0	2+2	0	28	1
5	DF	(Brazil) Victor Cardozo	12	1	1	0	0	0	4+1	3	18	4
6	MF	(Thailand) Sarach Yooyen	21+8	1	1+1	0	1+4	1	6	0	41	3
7	FW	(Brazil) Danilo Alves	10+11	5	0+1	1	2+1	3	5+1	0	31	9
9	FW	(Thailand) Surachat Sareepim	0+3	0	0	0	0	0	0+2	0	5	0
10	FW	(Thailand) Teerasil Dangda	11+6	6	1	0	2+3	3	4	0	27	9
11	FW	(Uzbekistan) Igor Sergeyev	12+4	5	0+2	0	0	0	6+1	6	25	11
14	FW	(Costa Rica) Freddy Álvarez	24+3	5	1+1	0	5	1	4+1	0	39	6
15	DF	(Thailand) Apisit Sorada	12+8	1	1+1	0	5	0	0+3	0	30	1
16	DF	(Thailand) Jakkapan Praisuwan	20+2	3	1+1	0	3+1	1	7	0	35	4
17	DF	(Singapore) (South Africa) Irfan Fandi	10+4	1	1	0	1+1	0	2	0	19	1
18	MF	(Thailand) Chanathip Songkrasin	14+9	4	0+1	1	2+2	2	4	2	32	9
19	FW	(Thailand) Chenrop Samphaodi	7+7	3	1+1	0	1+1	0	0+1	0	19	3
22	FW	(Thailand) Chananan Pombuppha	5+7	4	0	0	1+2	0	0	0	15	4
23	DF	(Thailand) Santipharp Chan-ngom	16+4	1	2	0	3+1	0	3+1	0	30	1
24	DF	(Singapore) (Wales) Ryhan Stewart	8+7	0	1	0	0	0	5+1	1	22	1
26	GK	(Thailand) Kittipong Phuthawchueak	15	0	1	0	3	0	2	0	21	0
27	FW	(Croatia) Denis Bušnja	4+3	0	0	0	0	0	0	0	7	0
32	GK	(Thailand) Supanai Juntrapasit	0	0	0	0	0	0	0	0	0	0
33	DF	(Thailand) Wattanakorn Sawatlakhorn	14+7	0	0+1	0	2+2	0	2+2	0	30	0
36	MF	(Thailand) Phitiwat Sukjitthammakul	21+1	1	2	0	2+2	0	6	0	34	1
48	MF	(Thailand) Kanokpon Buspakom	0	0	0	0	0	0	0+1	0	1	0
49	GK	(Thailand) Nalawich Intacharoen	0	0	0	0	0	0	0	0	0	0
55	DF	(Thailand) Chonnapat Buaphan	13+5	0	0	0	2	0	4	0	24	0
69	DF	(France) (Niger) Seydine N'Diaye	6	1	0	0	1	0	0	0	7	1
81	DF	(Thailand) Waris Choolthong	8+5	1	0	0	2	0	1+3	0	19	1
93	GK	(Thailand) Pisan Dorkmaikaew	3	0	0	0	2	0	0	0	5	0
99	FW	(Singapore) (South Africa) Ikhsan Fandi	12+6	8	1	1	3+1	2	0+2	0	25	11
Players who have played this season and/or sign for the season but had left the club on loan to other club
1	GK	(Thailand) Chatchai Budprom	11	0	1	0	0	0	5	0	17	0
8	MF	(Thailand) Chatmongkol Thongkiri	0+5	0	1	0	1	0	1+1	0	9	0
58	MF	(Thailand) Nattaphon Worasut	0	0	0	0	0	0	0+1	0	1	0
48	FW	(Thailand) Thitipat Ekarunpong	1+1	0	0	0	0	0	0	0	2	0
77	FW	(Thailand) (Sweden) Patrik Gustavsson	1+6	2	1	0	0+1	0	0+4	0	13	2
Players who have played this season and/or sign for the season but had left the club permanently
13	FW	(Croatia) Renato Kelić	5	2	1	0	1	0	1+1	0	9	2

== Competitions ==
=== Thai League 1 ===
==== Matches ====
Win Draw Loss

11 August 2023 1	Police Tero	2–2	BG Pathum United	Bangkok
19:30 ICT	Marc Landry Babo 48'; Maxx Creevey 84'; Siam Yapp (yellow card) 90+1'		Renato Kelić 15'; Patrik Gustavsson 63'; Freddy Álvarez (yellow card) 83'	Stadium: Boonyachinda Stadium; Attendance: 4,376; Referee: Songkran Bunmeekiart; Man of the Match: Phitiwat Sukjitthammakul (BG Pathum United)

18 August 2023 2	BG Pathum United	0–0	PT Prachuap	Pathum Thani
19:00 ICT	Irfan Fandi (yellow card) 51'; Victor Cardozo (yellow card) 54'; Jakkapan Praisuwan (red card) 88'		Saharat Pongsuwan (yellow card) 29'; Pathomchai Sueasakul (yellow card) 45'	Stadium: BG Stadium; Attendance: 8,270; Referee: Kotchapoom Meesridaech; Man of the Match: Chanathip Songkrasin (BG Pathum United)

28 August 2023 3	Uthai Thani	0–2	BG Pathum United	Uthai Thani
18:30 ICT	Wattana Playnum (yellow card) 13'		Igor Sergeyev 8'; Freddy Álvarez (yellow card) 45+3'; Chanathip Songkrasin 66'; Surachat Sareepim (yellow card) 89'	Stadium: Uthai Thani Province Stadium; Attendance: 5,009; Referee: Pawara Seejen; Man of the Match: Chanathip Songkrasin (BG Pathum United)

16 September 2023 4	BG Pathum United	5–2	Muangthong United	Pathum Thani
18:00 ICT	Jakkapan Praisuwan 28'; Freddy Álvarez 31'; Victor Cardozo 70' (yellow card) 72'; Patrik Gustavsson 85'; Phitiwat Sukjitthammakul 89'		Poramet Arjvirai 10'; Weerathep Pomphan (yellow card) 61'; Ryhan Stewart 87' (o.g.)	Stadium: BG Stadium; Attendance: 10,109; Referee: Chaireag Ngamsom; Man of the Match: Freddy Álvarez (BG Pathum United)

25 September 2023 5	True Bangkok United	2–0	BG Pathum United	Pathum Thani
20:00 ICT	Willen Mota 69', 90+2'			Stadium: Thammasat Stadium; Attendance: 4,041; Referee: Torphong Somsing; Man of the Match: Willen Mota (Bangkok United)

29 September 2023 6 (Rescheduled)	BG Pathum United	3–0	Lamphun Warriors	Pathum Thani
18:00 ICT	Santipharp Chan-ngom (yellow card) 34'; Wattanakorn Sawatlakhorn (yellow card) 34'; Shinnaphat Leeaoh (yellow card) 59'; Igor Sergeyev 70', 72'; Jakkapan Praisuwan 90+6'		Witthawin Klorwuttiwat (yellow card) 47'; Tauã Ferreira dos Santos (yellow card) 83'	Stadium: BG Stadium; Attendance: 6,346; Referee: Songkran Bunmeekiart; Man of the Match: Igor Sergeyev (BG Pathum United)

7 October 2023 7	Sukhothai	1–2	BG Pathum United	Sukhothai
18:00 ICT	Baggio Rakotonomenjanahary (yellow card) 48'; Jakkit Wachpirom (red card) 59'; Sarawut Kanlayanabandit (yellow card) 72'; Somkid Chamnarnsilp 90+1'		Jakkapan Praisuwan 50'; Victor Cardozo (yellow card) 67'; Chanathip Songkrasin 78'	Stadium: Thalay Luang Stadium; Attendance: 3,384; Referee: Pawara Seejen; Man of the Match: Jakkapan Praisuwan (BG Pathum United)

20 October 2023 8 (Rescheduled)	BG Pathum United	3–0	Trat	Pathum Thani
	Danilo Alves 22'; Chenrop Samphaodi 39'; Chanathip Songkrasin 63'; Chonnapat Buaphan (yellow card) 77'; Waris Choolthong (yellow card) 90+5'			Stadium: BG Stadium; Attendance: 5,601; Referee: Wiwat Jumpaoon

29 October 2023 9	Buriram United F.C.	0–0	BG Pathum United	Buriram
	Goran Čaušić (penalty missed) 41; Ramil Sheydayev (yellow card) 82'		Wattanakorn Sawatlakhorn (yellow card) 40'; Victor Cardozo (yellow card) 47'; Kittipong Phuthawchueak (yellow card) 56'; Freddy Álvarez (yellow card) 66'	Stadium: Chang Arena; Attendance: 27,548; Referee: Chaireag Ngamsom

28 December 2023 10 (Rescheduled)	BG Pathum United	2–2	Leo Chiangrai United	Pathum Thani
	Danilo Alves 38' (yellow card) 29'; Igor Sergeyev 90+9'; Sarach Yooyen (yellow card) 88'		Fellipe Veloso 5' (yellow card) 33'; Sivakorn Tiatrakul 45'; Bill (yellow card) 8'; Marco Ballini (red card) 59'; Saranon Anuin (yellow card) 73'	Stadium: BG Stadium

26 November 2023 11	Chonburi	1–3	BG Pathum United	Chonburi
	Kasidit Kalasin (yellow card) 54'; Channarong Promsrikaew 78'		Freddy Álvarez 1'; Chenrop Samphaodi 6'; Santipharp Chan-ngom 60'; Ryhan Stewart (yellow card) 84'	Stadium: Chonburi Stadium; Referee: Phairot Bunkamnoed

2 December 2023 12	Port	2–3	BG Pathum United	Bangkok
	Suphanan Bureerat 27'; Pakorn Prempak 32'; Noboru Shimura (yellow card) 47'; Bordin Phala (yellow card) 57'		Freddy Álvarez 76'; Teerasil Dangda 85' 90+5' (pen.); Waris Choolthong (yellow card) 35'; Victor Cardozo (yellow card) 40'; Jakkapan Praisuwan (yellow card) 60'	Stadium: PAT Stadium; Attendance: 5,862; Referee: Mongkolchai Pechsri

9 December 2023 13	BG Pathum United	2–1	Ratchaburi F.C.	Pathum Thani
	Igor Sergeyev 15'; Ikhsan Fandi 45+5'		Korawich Tasa 81'; Jonathan Khemdee (yellow card) 45+3'; Kiatisak Jiamudom (yellow card) 90+3'	Stadium: BG Stadium; Attendance: 6,281; Referee: Niwat Insa-ard

16 December 2023 14	Khon Kaen United F.C.	1–1	BG Pathum United	Khon Kaen
	Renato Kelić 8'; Victor Cardozo (yellow card) 16'; Sarach Yooyen (yellow card) 88'		Jakkit Palapon 55' (yellow card) 63'; Alongkorn Jornnathong (yellow card) 90+6'	Stadium: Khon Kaen Stadium; Attendance: 6,127; Referee: Noppadet Mangngam

24 December 2023 15	BG Pathum United	1–2	Nakhon Pathom United F.C.	Pathum Thani
	Shinnaphat Leeaoh 89' (yellow card) 40'; Danilo Alves (yellow card) 54'; Chonnapat Buaphan (yellow card) 90+3'		Taku Ito 49'; Jakkapan Praisuwan 55' (o.g.); Pitipol Prachayamongkol (yellow card) 18'; Athit Berg (yellow card) 45+1'; Adefolarin Durosinmi (yellow card) 45+3'; Wattanachai Srathongjan (yellow card) 90+3'	Stadium: BG Stadium; Attendance: 5,809; Referee: Chaireag Ngamsom

10 February 2024 16	PT Prachuap	1–1	BG Pathum United	Prachuap Khiri Khan
	Jeong Woo-geun 89'; Nopphon Ponkam (yellow card) 68'; Jirapan Phasukihan (yellow card) 70'; Chatchai Saengdao (yellow card) 90+3'		Irfan Fandi 83'; Chonnapat Buaphan (yellow card) 53'	Stadium: Sam Ao Stadium; Attendance: 2,840; Referee: Wiwat Jumpaoon

15 February 2024 17	BG Pathum United	2–0	Uthai Thani	Pathum Thani
	Phitiwat Sukjitthammakul (yellow card) 32'; Seydine N'Diaye (yellow card) 42'; Danilo Alves 53'; Apisit Sorada (yellow card) 66'; Sarach Yooyen (yellow card) 70'; Chananan Pombuppha 90+3'			Stadium: BG Stadium; Attendance: 6,172; Referee: Chaireag Ngamsom

18 February 2024 18	Muangthong United	2–0	BG Pathum United	Nonthaburi
	Poramet Arjvirai 39' (yellow card) 71'; Jaroensak Wonggorn 84'; Lee Jae-sung (yellow card) 40'; Tristan Do (yellow card) 80'		Ryhan Stewart (yellow card) 8'; Danilo Alves (yellow card) 68'	Stadium: Thunderdome Stadium; Attendance: 7,822; Referee: Songkran Bunmeekiart

25 February 2024 19	BG Pathum United	2–2	Bangkok United F.C.	Pathum Thani
	Seydine N'Diaye 8'; Danilo Alves 12' (yellow card) 62'; Freddy Álvarez (yellow card) 65'; Irfan Fandi (yellow card) 76'; Kittipong Phuthawchueak (yellow card) 88'; Chananan Pombuppha (red card) 90+7'		Pokklaw Anan 45+4'; Wisarut Imura 70'; Weerathep Pomphan (yellow card) 24'; Peerapat Notchaiya (yellow card) 60'	Stadium: BG Stadium

2 March 2024 20	Lamphun Warriors	2–0	BG Pathum United	Lamphun
	Negueba 20'; Aly Cissokho 66'			Stadium: Lamphun Province Stadium

9 March 2024 21	BG Pathum United	7–1	Sukhothai	Pathum Thani
	Ikhsan Fandi 12', 45+1'; Chaowat Veerachat 16'; Apisit Sorada 24'; Chanathip Songkrasin 63'; Sarach Yooyen 66'; Chananan Pombuppha 90+6'; Denis Bušnja (red card) 84'		Surawich Logarwit 87' (yellow card) 77'; Saringkan Promsupa (yellow card) 47'	Stadium: BG Stadium

30 March 2024 22	Trat	2–1	BG Pathum United	Trat
	Lidor Cohen 68'; Ben Azubel 71'		Ikhsan Fandi 61'	Stadium: Trat Province Stadium

3 April 2024 23	BG Pathum United	1–1	Buriram United	Pathum Thani
	Teerasil Dangda 56'		Lucas Crispim 37'	Stadium: BG Stadium

6 April 2024 24	Leo Chiangrai United	2–3	BG Pathum United	Chiang Rai
	Miguel Bianconi 43' (pen.) 74'		Ikhsan Fandi 11', 14'; Teerasil Dangda 36' (pen.)	Stadium: Leo Chiangrai Stadium

20 April 2024 25	BG Pathum United	1–1	Chonburi	Pathum Thani
	Songchai Thongcham 7' (o.g.)		Yotsakorn Burapha 82'	Stadium: BG Stadium

27 April 2024 26	BG Pathum United	1–3	Port	Pathum Thani
	Freddy Álvarez 14' (pen.)		Barros Tardeli 27'; Felipe Amorim 34'; Teerasak Poeiphimai 82'	Stadium: BG Stadium

4 May 2024 27	Ratchaburi	0–1	BG Pathum United	Ratchaburi
			Chananan Pombuppha 41'	Stadium: Dragon Solar Park

11 May 2024 28	BG Pathum United	3–2	Khon Kaen United	Pathum Thani
	Danilo Alves 5'; Teerasil Dangda 50'; Ikhsan Fandi 52'		Steeven Langil 31' (pen.) 79' (pen.)	Stadium: BG Stadium

19 May 2024 29	Nakhon Pathom United	1–3	BG Pathum United	Nakhon Pathom
	Jennarong Phupha 90+3'		Freddy Álvarez 34'; Chananan Pombuppha 78'; Teerasil Dangda 90+5'	Stadium: Nakhon Pathom Municipality Sport School Stadium

26 May 2024 30	BG Pathum United	4–2	Police Tero	Pathum Thani
	Waris Choolthong 21'; Ikhsan Fandi 33'; Chenrop Samphaodi 76'; Danilo Alves 86'		Juvhel Tsoumou 25' 73' (pen.)	Stadium: BG Stadium

Pos	Team	Pld	W	D	L	GF	GA	GD	Pts	Qualification
2	Bangkok United (Q)	30	17	10	3	58	24	+34	61	Qualification for AFC Champions League Elite Qualifying play-off
3	Port (Q)	30	16	9	5	72	37	+35	57	Qualification for AFC Champions League Two group stage
4	BG Pathum United	30	15	9	6	59	38	+21	54	
5	Muangthong United (Note: Qualified for the Champions League Two group stage due to Đông Á Thanh Hóa's withdrawal from the competition and BG Pathum United's decision not to participate.) (Q)	30	16	4	10	64	45	+19	52	Qualification for AFC Champions League Two group stage
6	Ratchaburi	30	11	6	13	39	35	+4	39	

Updated to match(es) played on 26 May 2024. Source: Thai League
Rules for classification: Season in progress: 1) Points; 2) Goal difference; 3) Goals scored; End of season: 1) Points; 2) Head-to-head points; 3) Head-to-head goal difference; 4) Goals scored.
(Q) Qualified for the phase indicated

=== Thai FA Cup ===
==== Matches ====
Win Draw Loss

1 November 2023 Round of 64	Pattaya United (T2)	0–1 (a.e.t.)	BG Pathum United	Chonburi
	Phon-Ek Jensen (yellow card) 58'		Chatmongkol Thongkiri (yellow card) 39'; Renato Kelić (yellow card) 74'; Chanathip Songkrasin 105+1'	Stadium: Nong Prue Stadium; Attendance: 3,009; Referee: Winat Phophat

20 December 2023 Round of 32	Chonburi (T1)	2–2 (a.e.t.) (4–2 p)	BG Pathum United	Chonburi
	Channarong Promsrikaew 75'; Phithak Phimpae 112'		Ikhsan Fandi 41'; Danilo Alves 99'	Stadium: Chonburi Stadium
	Penalties
	Willian Lira (penalty scored); Kritsada Kaman (penalty scored); Lee Chan-dong (penalty scored); Yotsakorn Burapha (penalty scored)		Jakkapan Praisuwan (penalty scored); Danilo Alves (penalty missed); Sarach Yooyen (penalty scored); Igor Sergeyev (penalty missed)

=== Thai League Cup ===
==== Matches ====
Win Draw Loss

6 December 2023 Round of 32	Samut Sakhon City (T3)	1–4	BG Pathum United	Mueang, Samut Sakhon
(UTC+7)	Arthit Sunthornphit 43'		Teerasil Dangda 55' (pen.); Danilo Alves 59', 74'; Shinnaphat Leeaoh 62'	Stadium: Stadium of Thailand National Sports University, Samut Sakhon Campus; Attendance: 1,125; Referee: Pawara Seejen

13 March 2024 Round of 16	Chonburi (T1)	1–4	BG Pathum United	Chonburi
	Amadou Ouattara 6'; Chalermpong Kerdkaew 90+3'		Jakkapan Praisuwan 9'; Ikhsan Fandi 39'; Teerasil Dangda 77'; Sarach Yooyen 88'	Stadium: Chonburi Stadium

24 April 2024 Quarter Final	Ratchaburi (T1)	0–3	BG Pathum United	Ratchaburi
			Danilo Alves 8'; Chanathip Songkrasin 85', 89'	Stadium: Dragon Solar Park

22 May 2024 Semi-finals	BG Pathum United	2–1	Port (T1)	Ratchaburi
	Ikhsan Fandi 41'; Freddy Álvarez 62'		Frans Putros 76'	Stadium: Dragon Solar Park

16 June 2024 Finals	BG Pathum United	1–0	Muangthong United (T1)	Pathum Thani
	Teerasil Dangda 90+8'			Stadium: Thammasat Stadium

=== 2023–24 AFC Champions League ===
==== Play-off round ====
22 August 2023 Play-off round	Shanghai Port (China)	2–3	(Thailand) BG Pathum United	Shanghai, China
19:30 UTC+8	Lucas João (yellow card) 22'; Mirahmetjan Muzepper 31'; Markus Pink 84'; Yang Shiyuan (yellow card) 87'	Report	Igor Sergeyev 12', 26', 61'; Sarach Yooyen (yellow card) 75'	Stadium: SAIC Motor Pudong Arena; Attendance: 15,013; Referee: Ammar Mahfoodh (Bahrain); Man of the Match: (Uzbekistan) Igor Sergeyev

==== Group stage ====
Pos	Team	Pld	W	D	L	GF	GA	GD	Pts	Qualification	KWF	UHD	JDT	BGP
1	(Japan) Kawasaki Frontale	6	5	1	0	17	6	+11	16	Advance to round of 16	—	1–0	5–0	4–2
2	(South Korea) Ulsan Hyundai	6	3	1	2	12	8	+4	10	Advance to round of 16	2–2	—	3–1	3–1
3	(Malaysia) Johor Darul Ta'zim	6	3	0	3	11	13	−2	9		0–1	2–1	—	4–1
4	(Thailand) BG Pathum United	6	0	0	6	9	22	−13	0		2–4	1–3	2–4	—

Source: AFC
Rules for classification: Tiebreakers

19 September 2023 Matchday 1	Ulsan Hyundai (South Korea)	3–1	(Thailand) BG Pathum United	Ulsan, South Korea
19:00 UTC+9	Martin Ádám 28', 73', 78'; Jung Seung-hyun (yellow card) 67'	Report	Chonnapat Buaphan (yellow card) 40'; Ryhan Stewart 41'	Stadium: Ulsan Munsu Football Stadium; Attendance: 3,788; Referee: Ahmed Al-Kaf (Oman); Man of the Match: (Hungary) Martin Ádám

3 October 2023 Matchday 2	BG Pathum United (Thailand)	2–4	(Malaysia) Johor Darul Ta'zim	Pathum Thani, Thailand
19:00 UTC+7	Victor Cardozo 5' (pen.) 55' (yellow card) 57'; Sarach Yooyen (yellow card) 73'; Igor Sergeyev (yellow card) 88'; Freddy Álvarez (yellow card) 90+4'	Report	Arif Aiman Hanapi 6', 78'; Bergson 14'; Juan Muñiz 53' (yellow card) 63'; Hong Wan (yellow card) 85'	Stadium: BG Stadium; Attendance: 5,964; Referee: Mohammed Abdulla Hassan Mohamed (United Arab Emirates); Man of the Match: (Malaysia) Arif Aiman Hanapi

24 October 2023 Matchday 3	BG Pathum United (Thailand)	2–4	(Japan) Kawasaki Frontale	Pathum Thani, Thailand
19:00 UTC+7	Igor Sergeyev 45+1'; Victor Cardozo 82' (pen.); Waris Choolthong (yellow card) 34'	Report	Daiya Tono 14'; Kento Tachibanada 52'; Marcinho 68'; Takuma Ominami 77'; Jung Sung-ryong (yellow card) 79'; Jesiel (yellow card) 89'; Kota Takai (yellow card) 90+2'; Yasuto Wakizaka (yellow card) 90+4'	Stadium: BG Stadium; Attendance: 6,998; Referee: Mooud Bonyadifar (Iran)

8 November 2023 Matchday 4	Kawasaki Frontale (Japan)	4–2	(Thailand) BG Pathum United	Kawasaki, Japan
19:00 UTC+9	Yasuto Wakizaka 16' (pen.) 40' (pen.); Kazuya Yamamura 68'; Taisei Miyashiro 90+8'; Kento Tachibanada (yellow card) 81'	Report	Chanathip Songkrasin 33', 41'; Wattanakorn Sawatlakhorn (yellow card) 38'; Freddy Álvarez (red card) 57'; Danilo Alves (yellow card) 79'	Stadium: Kawasaki Todoroki Stadium; Referee: Abdulrahman Al-Jassim (Qatar)

29 November 2023 Matchday 5	BG Pathum United (Thailand)	1–3	(South Korea) Ulsan Hyundai	Pathum Thani, Thailand
17:00 UTC+7	Igor Sergeyev 69'	Report	Jakkapan Praisuwan 20' (o.g.); Gustav Ludwigson 27'; Lee Myung-jae 62'	Stadium: BG Stadium; Attendance: 3,563; Referee: Ahmed Al-Kaf (Oman)

13 December 2023 Matchday 6	Johor Darul Ta'zim (Malaysia)	4–1	(Thailand) BG Pathum United	Johor, Malaysia
18:00 UTC+8	Bergson 55' (pen.) 66'; Endrick 86'; Arif Aiman Hanapi 90+2'; Heberty (yellow card) 26'; Matthew Davies (yellow card) 89'	Report	Igor Sergeyev 28' (yellow card) 67'; Ryhan Stewart (yellow card) 22'; Danilo Alves (yellow card) 39' (yellow-red card) 54'	Stadium: Sultan Ibrahim Stadium; Referee: Ma Ning (China)
