= Chanathip Songkrasin =

Thai footballer (born 1993)

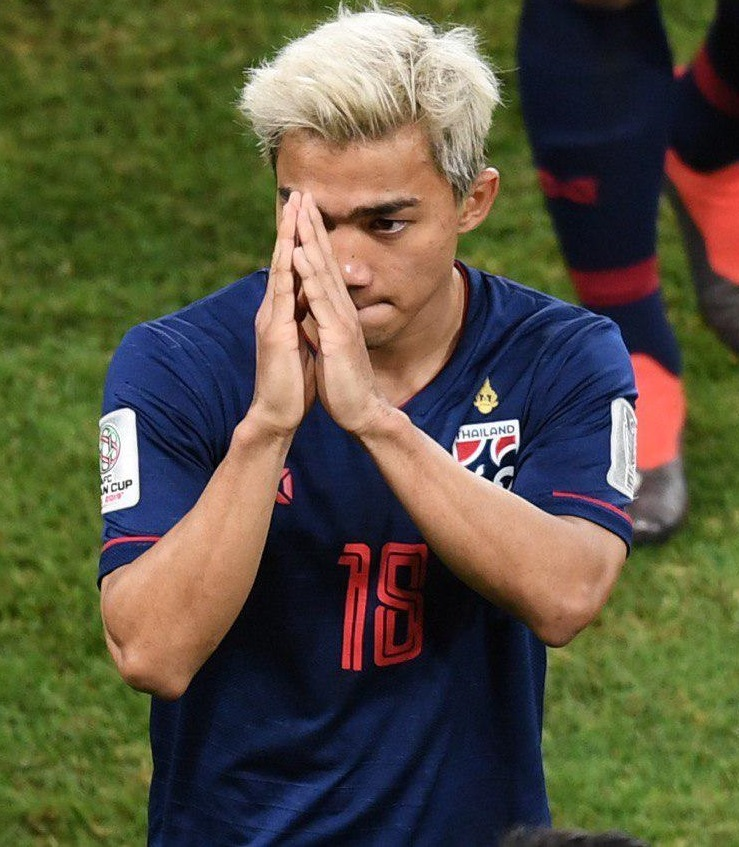
- Chanathip playing with Thailand at the 2019 AFC Asian Cup

Personal information
- Full name: Chanathip Songkrasin
- Date of birth: 5 October 1993 (age 33)
- Place of birth: Sam Phran, Nakhon Pathom, Thailand
- Height: 1.58 m (5 ft 2 in)
- Position: Attacking midfielder

Team information
- Current team: BG Pathum United
- Number: 18

Youth career
- 2006–2008: Sam Phran Wittaya School
- 2009–2011: Rajdamnern Commercial College
- 2011–2012: BEC Tero Sasana

Senior career*
Years	Team	Apps	(Gls)
2013–2016	BEC Tero Sasana	76	(9)
2016	→ Muangthong United (loan)	27	(3)
2016–2017	Muangthong United	17	(2)
2017	→ Hokkaido Consadole Sapporo (loan)	16	(0)
2018–2021	Hokkaido Consadole Sapporo	99	(14)
2022–2023	Kawasaki Frontale	18	(0)
2023–	BG Pathum United	64	(9)

International career^{‡}
2011–2012	Thailand U19	8	(1)
2012–2016	Thailand U23	30	(7)
2012–	Thailand	80	(15)
Medal record
Men's football
Representing Thailand
FIFA ASEAN Cup
Runner-up	2026 Indonesia	Team
ASEAN Championship
Runner-up	AFF Suzuki Cup 2012	Team
Winner	AFF Suzuki Cup 2014	Team
Winner	AFF Suzuki Cup 2016	Team
Winner	AFF Suzuki Cup 2020	Team
SEA Games
Gold medal – first place	2013 Myanmar	Team
Gold medal – first place	2015 Singapore	Team
- * Club domestic league appearances and goals as of 03:00, 16 February 2026 (UTC) ‡ National team caps and goals as of 5 October 2026

Chanathip Songkrasin (Thai: ชนาธิป สรงกระสินธ์, pronounced [t͡ɕʰā.nāː.tʰíp sǒŋ.krā.sǐn]; born 5 October 1993), is a Thai professional footballer who plays as an attacking midfielder for Thai League 1 club BG Pathum United and the Thailand national team.

Chanathip is known to be one of the best footballers in Southeast Asia. His style of play as a diminutive, left-footed dribbler, drew career-long comparisons with Lionel Messi, earning him the nickname the 'Thai Messi'.

== Club career ==
=== BEC Tero Sasana ===
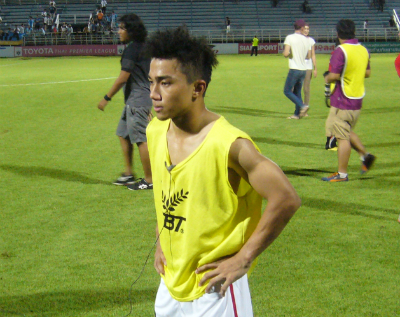
Chanathip with BEC Tero Sasana in 2015

Chanathip was promoted to the BEC Tero Sasana first team squad by new coach Andrew Ord who had also been his youth team coach. His first senior team goal came on 6 May, in a match against Thai Port in the Thai League 1, which gave BEC Tero Sasana a 2–0 win. In early 2013 Chanathip had an offer from J.League side Gamba Osaka. At the end of the season, he won the TPL Young Player of the Year.

In mid-October Shimizu S-Pulse of the J.League offered him a trial at the end of the 2013 season. In late October it was reported directly from BEC Tero Sasana's general manager Robert Procureur that Bundesliga club Hamburg would give Chanathip a trial at the end of the 2014 Bundesliga season and if he succeeded he would be the second Thai player to play in the Bundesliga after Witthaya Laohakul.

=== Muangthong United ===
On 27 January 2016, it was announced that Chanathip, along with his BEC Tero teammates Peerapat Notchaiya and Tanaboon Kesarat, would be joining Muangthong United on loan for the 2016 season. Chanathip netted his first goal for Muangthong United on 1 May 2016 when he scored from Tristan Do's cross in the 18th minute, in what turned out to be the only goal in a victory over Chonburi. Chanathip later permanently joined Muangthong United for an undisclosed fee. He helped his club to win the 2016 Thai League and 2016 Thai League Cup in his first season.

Chanathip Songkrasin produced a strong performance in the 2017 AFC Champions League group stage in the first two games against Australian club Brisbane Roar and Japanese club Kashima Antlers, from which Muangthong United managed to collect four points. He was named man of the match for both games.

=== Hokkaido Consadole Sapporo ===
In December 2016, it was announced that Chanathip would be joining the newly promoted J.League side Hokkaido Consadole Sapporo in the summer of 2017 on loan from Muangthong United, lasting for a season and a half. Chanathip was officially presented by Consadole Sapporo on 11 January 2017. This loan followed Chanathip's impressive performances during the 2016 AFF Championship in addition to being scouted by Consadole Sapporo previously. Chanathip played the first half of the 2017 season with his parent club, Muangthong United, before heading to Sapporo, Japan, in July 2017.

On 26 July 2017, Chanathip made his debut for Consadole Sapporo in 2017 J.League Cup against Cerezo Osaka as a substitute replacing Ryota Hayasaka in the 46th minute. On 29 July 2017, he was part of the starting lineup in a J1 League match against Urawa Red Diamonds, his first ever league appearance. Besides, he became the first Thai footballer appearing in the top tier of Japan's professional football league system (Previously, other Thais only appeared in Japanese football semi-professional top tier or professional lower tiers.). His first J-League goal came through a header in a 3–3 draw at Cerezo Osaka on 2 March 2018.

On 13 July 2018, Chanathip signed a contract with Consadole Sapporo, making him a permanent Hokkaido Consadole Sapporo player until 1 February 2019.

On 3 December 2018, after leading Consadole Sapporo to a record high fourth-place finish in 2018 J1 League, Chanathip was voted by his teammates as the team's most valuable player of the season. After that, he was announced as one of the players in J.League team of the season, being the first ever Southeast Asian to achieve this feat.

=== Kawasaki Frontale ===
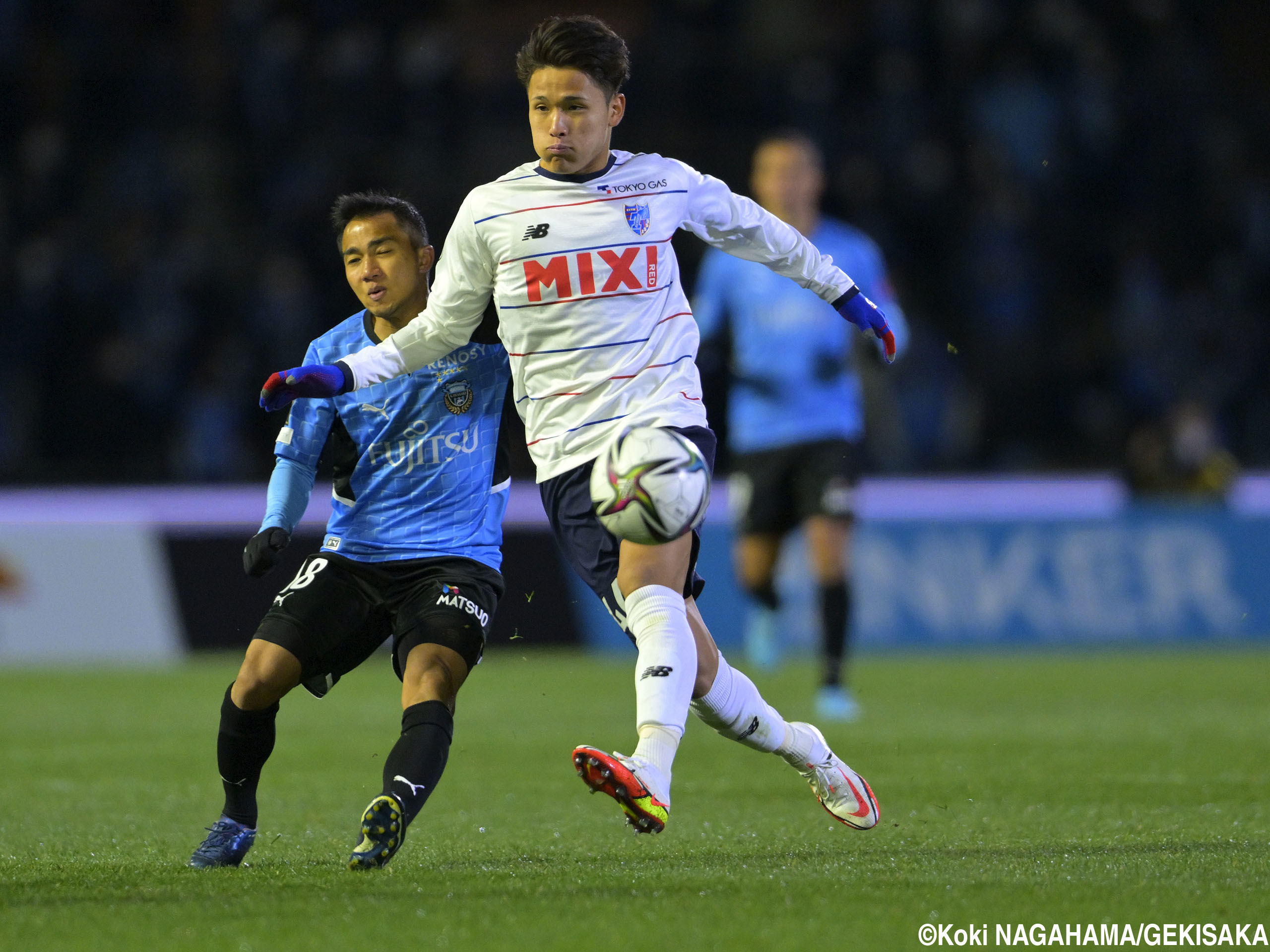
Chanatip (left) with Kawasaki Frontale in 2022

On 11 January 2022, Chanathip joined Kawasaki Frontale with a transfer fee of around $3.8 million, breaking the J.League record for the highest domestic transfer. He make his debut for the club on 18 February in a 1–0 win against FC Tokyo. On 12 March, he assist Marcinho in a match against Nagoya Grampus which is the only goal in the match which resulted in a win. Chanathip scored his first goal for the club during the 2022 AFC Champions League match in a 8–0 thrashing win against Chinese club Guangzhou on 18 April.

=== BG Pathum United ===
In June 2023, Chanathip returned to the Thai League 1, signing with BG Pathum United. He make his debut for the club on 11 August in a 2–2 draw against Police Tero.

Chanathip then scored his first league goal since 2017 in a 2–0 away win against Uthai Thani on 28 August. During the 2023–24 AFC Champions League, Chanathip scored a brace against his former club Kawasaki Frontale in a 4–2 away lost on 7 November where he was greeted with warm reception from the Japanese fans. On 16 June 2024, he helped the club to win the 2023–24 Thai League Cup.

== International career ==
=== Youth ===
Chanathip started his international stage with Thailand U19, he played latest in 2012 AFC U-19 Championship. At the age of under-23, he represented Thailand U23 in the 2013 Southeast Asian Games and also 2014 Asian Games.

=== Senior ===
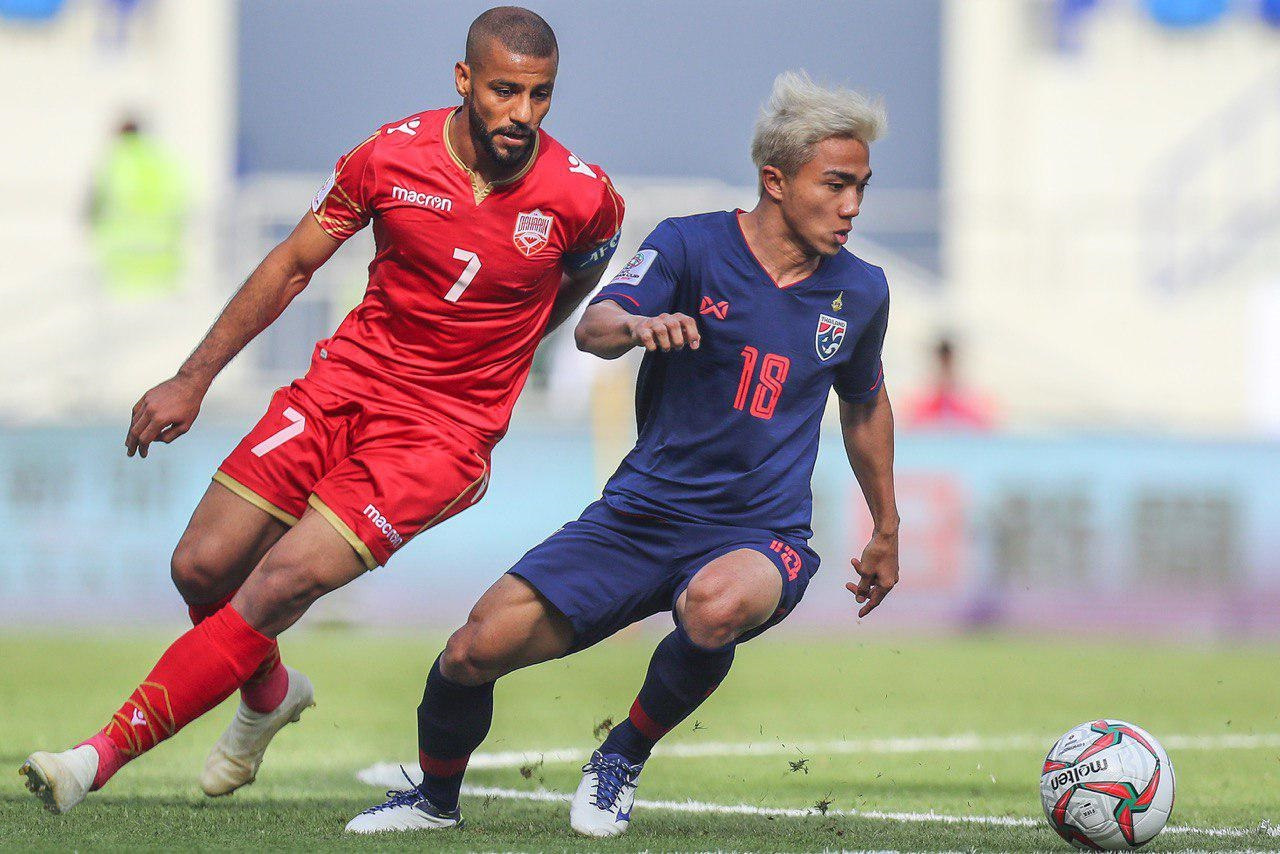
Chanathip playing for Thailand in 2019 AFC Asian Cup

In the top level, Chanathip was first called up by Thailand national team head coach Winfried Schäfer to compete in the 2012 King's Cup, and debuted in this tournament. He continued to be called to 2012 AFF Suzuki Cup squad. At 19 years old, he was the youngest player who called by Winfried Schäfer. In February 2013, Chanathip scored his first goal for the first team against Kuwait in the 2015 AFC Asian Cup qualification which ended up 1-3 lost against Kuwait. After that game, he scored another goal in a friendly match against China. In 2014, Chanathip was a part of Thailand's winning squad for the 2014 AFF Suzuki Cup. During the tournament Chanathip scored the first goal in the 3–0 win over the Philippines in the semi-finals and assisted second goal for Kroekrit Thaweekarn in a 2–0 victory over Malaysia in the first leg of the final. He also scored the last goal in the second leg to cement Thailand's place on the trophy. Afterwards he was named best player of the tournament and became the youngest AFF Suzuki Cup MVP at the age of 21. In May 2015, he was called up by Thailand to play in the 2018 FIFA World Cup qualification match against Vietnam. The same year, Chanathip won the 2015 Southeast Asian Games with Thailand U23. In December 2016, Chanathip again led Thailand to the title of 2016 AFF Championship, the fifth title of his nation. He was also awarded another Most Valuable Player and became the first player to win it twice. He was named into the Thai squad participating in the 2019 AFC Asian Cup. After an unpromising performance against India in the first match, where he silenced as Thailand suffered a 1–4 shock loss, he returned to prominence, scoring one goal as Thailand overcame Bahrain and holding host UAE to reach the round of sixteen for the first time since 1972 competition. In December 2021, Chanathip was named captain for Thailand in the 2020 AFF Championship, winning the championship for the sixth time for his nation. He was also named the Most Valuable Player (MVP) for the tournament, winning it for the third time.

After the retirement of captain Theerathon Bunmathan from the national team, Chanathip was named as captain for the national team in the 2024 King's Cup. On 11 October 2024, He was instrumental in the match against Philippines where he scored a goal in a 3–1 win which sees Thailand advance to the final. In the final, Chanathip scored a 90+1' minute goal which puts Thailand in a 2–1 win against Syria where it secures Thailand their 16th title.

== Style of play ==
Chanathip usually plays in the position of attacking midfielder who provides the chance for his front line. He is known for his pace, agility, and dribbles that can handle 1-3 opponents while in possession and can play both feet. Chanathip also has the special threat of powerful and accurate shots from outside the box. Gongphop Songkrasin, Chanathip's father, and his first trainer later revealed that he was supposed to train his son with the style of his idol Diego Maradona.

Due to his short stature, Chanathip has a lower centre of gravity than taller players, which gives him greater agility, allowing him to change direction more quickly and evade opposing tackles. His short, strong legs allow him to excel in short bursts of acceleration while his quick feet enable him to retain control of the ball when dribbling at speed. Chanathip pace and technical ability enable him to undertake individual dribbling runs towards goal, in particular during counterattacks, usually starting from the halfway line or the right side of the pitch.

== Early life & personal life ==
He was born in the market town of Sam Phran, a small riverside community on the Tha Chin River in Nakhon Pathom Province, west of Bangkok. The area was largely rural and agricultural. He started playing football in the fourth grade, with strong encouragement and support from his father.

Chanathip was romantically involved with actress Pitchanart Sakakorn for a time, but the relationship eventually came to an end.

== Career statistics ==
=== Club ===
As of match played 28 August 2024

Club	Season	League			National cup (Note: Includes Thai FA Cup, Emperor's Cup)		League cup (Note: Includes Thai League Cup, J.League Cup)		Asia		Other		Total	
Club	Season	Division	Apps	Goals	Apps	Goals	Apps	Goals	Apps	Goals	Apps	Goals	Apps	Goals
BEC Tero Sasana	2012	Thai Premier League	28	4	2	0	3	0	—		—		33	4
BEC Tero Sasana	2013	Thai Premier League	26	3	1	0	1	0	—		—		28	3
BEC Tero Sasana	2014	Thai Premier League	27	4	0	0	5	0	—		—		32	4
BEC Tero Sasana	2015	Thai Premier League	23	2	1	0	1	0	—		—		25	2
BEC Tero Sasana	Total		104	13	4	0	10	0	—		—		118	13
Muangthong United	2016	Thai League T1	27	3	1	0	3	0	2 (Note: Appearances in AFC Champions League)	0	1 (Note: Appearance in Kor Royal Cup)	0	34	3
Muangthong United	2017	Thai League T1	17	2	0	0	0	0	8	1	1 (Note: Appearance in Thailand Champions Cup)	0	26	3
Muangthong United	Total		44	5	1	0	3	0	10	1	2	0	60	6
Hokkaido Consadole Sapporo	2017	J1 League	16	0	0	0	1	0	—		—		17	0
Hokkaido Consadole Sapporo	2018	J1 League	30	8	1	1	0	0	—		—		31	9
Hokkaido Consadole Sapporo	2019	J1 League	28	4	0	0	2	0	—		—		30	4
Hokkaido Consadole Sapporo	2020	J1 League	18	1	0	0	2	0	—		—		20	1
Hokkaido Consadole Sapporo	2021	J1 League	23	1	0	0	2	0	—		—		25	1
Hokkaido Consadole Sapporo	Total		115	15	1	1	7	0	0	0	0	0	123	16
Kawasaki Frontale	2022	J1 League	16	0	0	0	1	0	3	2	1 (Note: Appearance in Japanese Super Cup)	0	22	2
Kawasaki Frontale	2023	J1 League	2	0	0	0	3	1	0	0	—		5	1
Kawasaki Frontale	Total		18	0	0	0	4	1	3	2	1	0	26	3
BG Pathum United	2023–24	Thai League 1	23	4	1	1	4	2	4	2	—		54	9
BG Pathum United	2024–25	Thai League 1	4	1	0	0	0	0	0	0	1 (Note: Appearances in ASEAN Club Championship)	0	5	1
BG Pathum United	Total		27	5	1	1	4	2	4	2	1	0	59	10
Career total			308	38	7	2	28	3	17	5	4	0	386	48

=== International ===
As of match played 5 October 2026

Appearances and goals by national team and year
National team	Year	Apps	Goals
Thailand	2012	3	0
Thailand	2013	4	2
Thailand	2014	6	2
Thailand	2015	4	0
Thailand	2016	14	1
Thailand	2017	4	0
Thailand	2018	4	0
Thailand	2019	10	3
Thailand	2021	6	4
Thailand	2022	2	0
Thailand	2023	6	0
Thailand	2024	5	2
Thailand	2025	8	1
Thailand	2026	4	0
Total		80	15

International goals

Scores and results list Thailand's goal tally first.

No.	Date	Venue	Opponent	Score	Result	Competition
1.	6 February 2013	Rajamangala Stadium, Bangkok, Thailand	Kuwait	1–3	1–3	2015 AFC Asian Cup qualification
2.	15 June 2013	Hefei Olympic Sports Center Stadium, Hefei, China	China	4–1	5–1	Friendly
3.	10 December 2014	Rajamangala Stadium, Bangkok, Thailand	Philippines	1–0	3–0	2014 AFF Championship
4.	20 December 2014	Bukit Jalil National Stadium, Kuala Lumpur, Malaysia	Malaysia	2–3	2–3	2014 AFF Championship
5.	8 December 2016	Rajamangala Stadium, Bangkok, Thailand	Myanmar	4–0	4–0	2016 AFF Championship
6.	10 January 2019	Al-Maktoum Stadium, Dubai, United Arab Emirates	Bahrain	1–0	1–0	2019 AFC Asian Cup
7.	21 March 2019	Guangxi Sports Center, Nanning, China	China	1–0	1–0	2019 China Cup
8.	14 November 2019	Bukit Jalil National Stadium, Kuala Lumpur, Malaysia	Malaysia	1–0	1–2	2022 FIFA World Cup qualification
9.	23 December 2021	National Stadium, Kallang, Singapore	Vietnam	1–0	2–0	2020 AFF Championship
10.	23 December 2021	National Stadium, Kallang, Singapore	Vietnam	2–0	2–0	2020 AFF Championship
11.	29 December 2021	National Stadium, Kallang, Singapore	Indonesia	1–0	4–0	2020 AFF Championship
12.	29 December 2021	National Stadium, Kallang, Singapore	Indonesia	2–0	4–0	2020 AFF Championship
13.	11 October 2024	Tinsulanon Stadium, Songkhla, Thailand	Philippines	1–0	3–1	2024 King's Cup
14.	14 October 2024	Tinsulanon Stadium, Songkhla, Thailand	Syria	2–1	2–1	2024 King's Cup
15.	9 October 2025	Rajamangala Stadium, Bangkok, Thailand	Chinese Taipei	2–0	2–0	2027 AFC Asian Cup qualification

== Honours ==
=== Club ===
BEC Tero Sasana

- Thai League Cup: 2014

Muangthong United

- Thai League 1: 2016
- Thai League Cup: 2016
- Thailand Champions Cup: 2017

Hokkaido Consadole Sapporo

- J.League Cup runner-up: 2019

BG Pathum United

- Thai League Cup: 2023–24
- Kawasaki Frontale
- Emperol cup :2022-2023

=== International ===
Thailand U19

- AFF U-19 Youth Championship: 2011

Thailand U23

- SEA Games: 2013, 2015

Thailand

- AFF Championship: 2014, 2016, 2020
- King's Cup: 2016, 2024

=== Individual ===
- Thai Premier League Young Player of the Year: 2012, 2013, 2014, 2015, 2016
- AFF Championship Best eleven: 2014, 2016, 2020
- ASEAN Football Federation Best XI: 2017
- AFF Championship All-time XI
- AFF Championship Most Valuable Player: 2014, 2016, 2020
- AFF Men's Player of the Year: 2015, 2017
- FA Thailand President Award: 2017
- FA Thailand Men's Player of the Year: 2018
- Consadole Sapporo Most Valuable Player: 2018
- Sapporo Dome Most Valuable Player: 2018
- J.League Best XI: 2018
- AFF Championship Top Scorer: 2020

Orders

- Silver Medalist (Seventh Class) of The Most Admirable Order of the Direkgunabhorn: 2015
