= Airfan Doloh =

Thai footballer (born 2001)

Personal information
- Full name: Airfan Doloh
- Date of birth: 26 January 2001 (age 25)
- Place of birth: Yala, Thailand
- Height: 1.68 m (5 ft 6 in)
- Positions: Midfielder; left-back

Team information
- Current team: Uthai Thani

Youth career
- 2013–2018: Buriram United

Senior career*
Years	Team	Apps	(Gls)
2019–2024	Buriram United	20	(0)
2020–2021	→ Uthai Thani (loan)	13	(0)
2023–2024	→ Uthai Thani (loan)	27	(0)
2024–2025	BG Pathum United	13	(1)
2025	→ Ayutthaya United (loan)	13	(0)
2026–	Uthai Thani	0	(0)

International career^{‡}
2018–2019	Thailand U19	8	(1)
2021–2023	Thailand U23	22	(1)
2024–	Thailand	4	(0)
Medal record
Thailand under-23
Southeast Asian Games
Silver medal – second place	Sea Games 2021	Football
- * Club domestic league appearances and goals as of 28 April 2024 ‡ National team caps and goals as of 4 June 2025

Airfan Doloh (Thai: อิรฟาน ดอเลาะ, born 26 January 2001) is a Thai professional footballer who plays as a midfielder or a left-back for Thai League 1 club Uthai Thani and the Thailand national team.

== International career ==
Doloh made his debut for the Thailand national team on 11 June 2024 in a 2026 FIFA World Cup qualifier against Singapore at the Rajamangala Stadium. He substituted Weerathep Pomphan in the 89th minute in a 3–1 Thailand victory.

== Honours ==
=== Club ===
Buriram United

- Thai League 1 (3): 2018, 2021–22, 2022–23
- Thai FA Cup (2): 2021–22, 2022–23
- Thai League Cup (2): 2021–22, 2022–23
- Thailand Champions Cup: 2019

=== International ===
Thailand U23

- Southeast Asian Games (silver) Silver medal: 2021, 2023

== Personal life ==
Doloh is a Muslim of Malay ethnicity, from Kampung Jambu Rendang, in Bacho district, Narathiwat province, on the border of Kelantan. He is able to speak the Kelantan-Pattani Malay.
