= Sanchai Nontasila =

Thai footballer (born 1996)

Personal information
- Full name: Sanchai Nontasila
- Date of birth: 30 March 1996 (age 30)
- Place of birth: Bangkok, Thailand
- Height: 1.77 m (5 ft 9 1/2 in)
- Position: Left back

Team information
- Current team: Ratchaburi

Youth career
- 2010–2014: BEC Tero Sasana

Senior career*
| Years | Team | Apps | (Gls) |
| 2014–2023 | Police Tero | 84 | (0) |
| 2014 | → BCC Tero (loan) | 19 | (0) |
| 2017 | → Udon Thani (loan) | 20 | (0) |
| 2019 | → Thai Honda (loan) | 19 | (2) |
| 2023–2024 | Ratchaburi | 27 | (1) |
| 2024–2026 | BG Pathum United | 32 | (2) |
| 2026– | Ratchaburi | 0 | (0) |
- * Club domestic league appearances and goals as of 9 January 2026

Sanchai Nontasila (สัญชัย นนทศิลา; born 30 March 1996) is a Thai professional footballer who plays as a left back for Thai League 1 club Ratchaburi F.C.
