= Kiadtiphon Udom =

Thai footballer

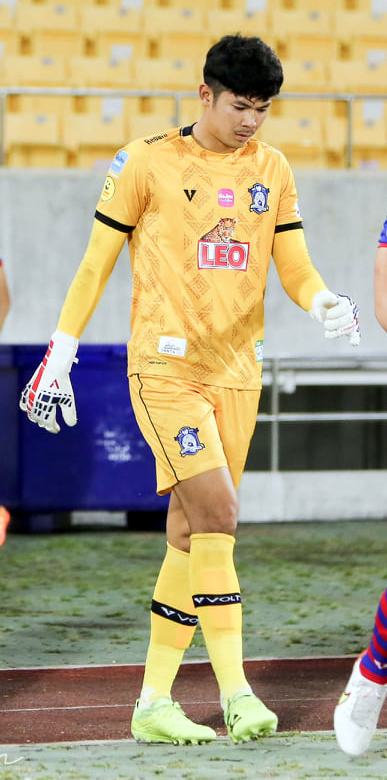
- Udom playing for Chiangmai in 2022

Personal information
- Full name: Kiadtiphon Udom
- Date of birth: 26 June 2000 (age 26)
- Place of birth: Roi Et, Thailand
- Height: 1.93 m (6 ft 4 in)
- Position: Goalkeeper

Team information
- Current team: Phrae United (on loan from BG Pathum United)
- Number: 14

Youth career
- 2016–2018: BG Pathum United

Senior career*
Years	Team	Apps	(Gls)
2018–	BG Pathum United	0	(0)
2018	→ BGC (loan)	1	(0)
2020–2021	→ Rajpracha (loan)	33	(0)
2022	→ Chiangmai (loan)	15	(0)
2023	→ Chainat Hornbill (loan)	7	(0)
2023–2024	→ Pattani (loan)	4	(0)
2024	→ Nara Club (loan)	0	(0)
2024	→ Chiangrai United (loan)	0	(0)
2025–	→ Phrae United (loan)	0	(0)

International career^{‡}
2021–2022	Thailand U23	6	(0)
- * Club domestic league appearances and goals as of 26 December 2024 ‡ National team caps and goals as of 29 March 2022

Kiadtiphon Udom (Thai: เกียรติพล อุดม, born 26 June 2000) is a Thai professional footballer who plays as a goalkeeper for Thai League 2 club Phrae United, on loan from BG Pathum United.

== International career ==
On 15 October 2021, Kiadtiphon was called up to the Thailand U23 national team for the 2022 AFC U-23 Asian Cup qualification.
