= Veljko Filipović =

Serbian footballer (born 1999)

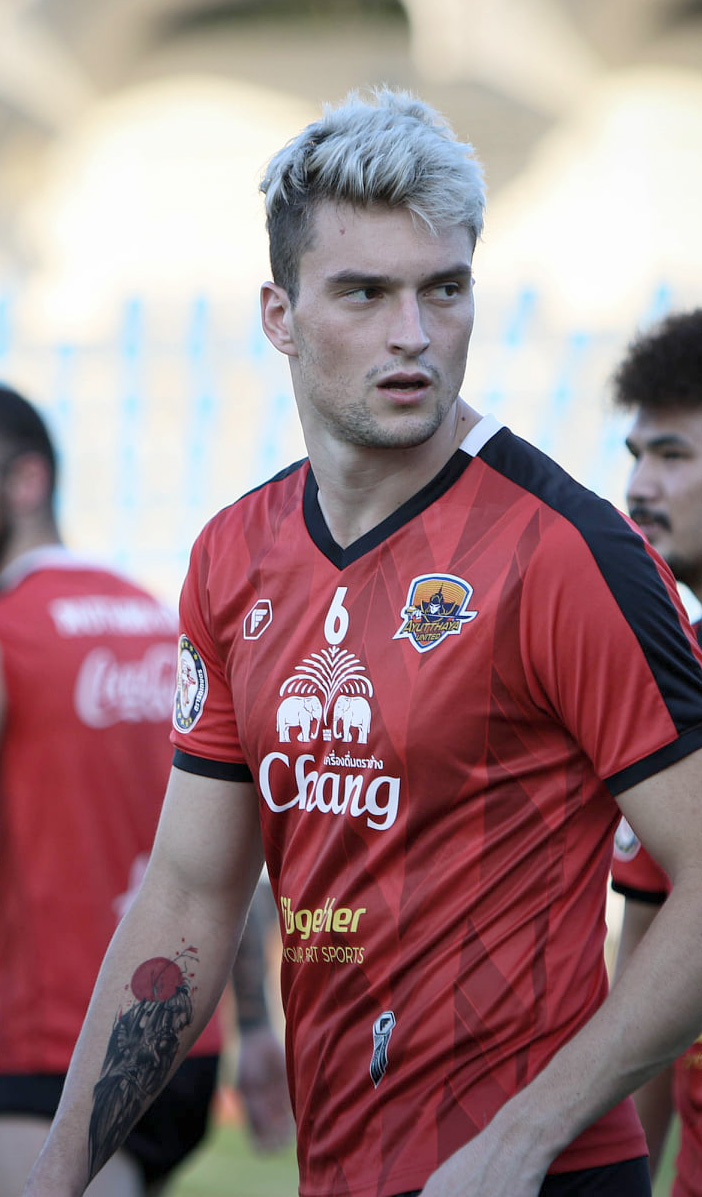

Personal information
- Full name: Veljko Filipović
- Date of birth: 11 October 1999 (age 27)
- Place of birth: Čačak, FR Yugoslavia
- Height: 1.97 m (6 ft 5 1/2 in)
- Position: Centre-back

Team information
- Current team: Bukhara
- Number: 2

Youth career
- Borac Čačak

Senior career*
Years	Team	Apps	(Gls)
2018–2019	Borac Čačak	28	(1)
2019–2020	Javor Ivanjica	1	(0)
2020	→ Sinđelić Beograd (loan)	0	(0)
2020–2021	Ayutthaya United	21	(0)
2021–2024	BG Pathum United	0	(0)
2021–2023	→ Chiangmai (loan)	59	(7)
2023–2024	→ Chiangrai United (loan)	11	(0)
2024–2025	Nakhon Pathom United	24	(1)
2025	Rayong FC	13	(0)
2026–	Bukhara	11	(1)
- * Club domestic league appearances and goals as of 28 July 2026

Veljko Filipović (Serbian Cyrillic: Вељко Филиповић; born 11 October 1999) is a Serbian footballer who plays for Bukhara in Uzbekistan Super League.
