= Thitipat Ekarunpong =

Thai footballer

Personal information
- Full name: Thitipat Ekarunpong
- Date of birth: 18 September 2005 (age 21)
- Place of birth: Samut Songkhram, Thailand
- Height: 1.84 m (6 ft 0 in)
- Position: Striker

Team information
- Current team: Nakhon Pathom United (on loan from BG Pathum United)
- Number: 48

Youth career
- 2021–2024: BG Pathum United

Senior career*
Years	Team	Apps	(Gls)
2023–	BG Pathum United	1	(0)
2024	→ Tampines Rovers (loan)	1	(0)
2025	→ Tiamo Hirakata (loan)	0	(0)
2025–	→ Nakhon Pathom United (loan)	24	(1)
- * Club domestic league appearances and goals as of 16 June 2024

Thitipat Ekarunpong (Thai: ฐิติภัส เอกอรัญพงศ์; born 18 September 2005) is a Thai footballer who currently plays as a striker for Thai League 2 club Nakhon Pathom United, on loan from Thai League 1 club BG Pathum United.

== Club career ==
=== BG Pathum United ===
Thitipat was promoted to BG Pathum United senior squad in the 2023–24 Thai League 1 season where on 25 September 2023, he make his debut in a 2–0 lost to Bangkok United

==== Loan to Tampines Rovers ====
On 23 January 2024, Thitipat was loaned out to Singapore Premier League club Tampines Rovers along with teammate and fellow countryman Thanet Suknate on a year loan. Both clubs had recently signed a collaboration partnership with each other that would see players transferred between each club, in addition to a host of incentives and benefits. He make his debut for the club on 16 June coming on as a substitution in a 3–0 win over Tanjong Pagar United.

==== Loan to Tiamo Hirakata ====
After his loan spell expired with Tampines Rovers, Thitipat was loaned out to fourth tier Japanese club Tiamo Hirakata for the 2025 Japan Football League season.

== Career statistics ==
=== Club ===
As of match played 3 October 2024

Appearances and goals by club, season and competition
Club	Season	League			National cup		League cup		Continental		Total	
Club	Season	Division	Apps	Goals	Apps	Goals	Apps	Goals	Apps	Goals	Apps	Goals
BG Pathum United	2023–24	Thai League 1	2	0	0	0	0	0	0	0	2	0
BG Pathum United	Total		2	0	0	0	0	0	0	0	2	0
BG Tampines Rovers (loan)	2024–25	Singapore Premier League	1	0	0	0	0	0	0	0	1	0
BG Tampines Rovers (loan)	Total		1	0	0	0	0	0	0	0	1	0
Career total			3	0	0	0	0	0	0	0	3	0
