= Freddy Álvarez (footballer) =

Costa Rican footballer (born 1995)

Personal information
- Full name: Freddy Antonio Álvarez Rodríguez
- Date of birth: 26 April 1995 (age 31)
- Place of birth: Limón, Costa Rica
- Height: 1.70 m (5 ft 7 in)
- Positions: Attacking midfielder; winger

Team information
- Current team: Tirana
- Number: 10

Senior career*
Years	Team	Apps	(Gls)
–2014	Saprissa	0	(0)
2014	Uruguay de Coronado	27	(1)
2015–2016	La U	65	(9)
2017	Municipal	37	(3)
2018–2019	Alajuelense	31	(2)
2019	Herediano	19	(3)
2020	Jicaral	21	(8)
2020–2023	Shkupi	100	(20)
2023–2025	BG Pathum United	48	(7)
2025–	Tirana	24	(3)
- * Club domestic league appearances and goals as of 1 June 2025

Freddy Antonio Álvarez Rodríguez (born 26 April 1995) is a Costa Rican professional footballer who plays as an attacking midfielder or a winger for Kategoria Superiore club Tirana.

== Club career ==
Álvarez started his career with Costa Rican top flight side Saprissa. In 2014, he signed for Uruguay de Coronado in Costa Rica. Before the 2017 season, Álvarez signed for Peruvian club Municipal. Before the second half of 2017–18, he signed for Alajuelense in Costa Rica, where he made 31 league appearances and scored 2 goals. On 18 March 2018, Álvarez debuted for Alajuelense during a 1–0 win over Cartaginés. On 4 March 2019, he scored his first goal for Alajuelense during a 2–2 draw with La U.

In 2020, Álvarez signed for Macedonian team Shkupi, helping them win the league, their only major trophy.

== Honours ==
Shkupi

- Macedonian First League: 2021–22

BG Pathum United

- Thai League Cup: 2023–24
