= 2021–22 Ratchaburi Mitr Phol F.C. season =

Ratchaburi Mitr Phol
2021–22 season
- Chairman: Boonying Nitikarnchana
- Manager: Somchai Maiwilai
- Stadium: Mitr Phol Stadium, Mueang Ratchaburi, Ratchaburi, Thailand
- Thai League T1: -
- Thai FA Cup: -
- Thai League Cup: -
- AFC Champions League: Group Stage
- Top goalscorer: League: Derley (9); All: Derley (9)
Home colours	Away colours	Third colours

The 2021–22 season is Ratchaburi Mitr Phol Football Club's 15th existence. It is the 6th season in the Thai League and the club's 9th consecutive season in the top flight of the Thai football league system since promoted in the 2013 season. Also, having finished 4th in the first half of 2020-21 Thai League 1, Ratchaburi Mitr Phol Football Club are qualified for the play-off stage of the 2021 AFC Champions League for the first time in the club's history, but after Jiangsu ceased operation, Ratchaburi Mitr Phol automatically qualified to the group stage instead alongside Pohang Steelers. In this season, Ratchaburi Mitr Phol participates in 4 competitions which consisted of the Thai League, FA Cup, League Cup, and AFC Champions League.

2021–22 Thai League 1 season was supposed to start on 31 July 2021 and concluded on 21 May 2022. Then, due to the situation of the COVID-19 pandemic is still severe, FA Thailand decided to postpone the season to start on 13 August 2021 instead. However, as it stands on 23 July 2021, the COVID-19's situation is getting even worse. Therefore, FA Thailand decided to postpone the opening day for the second time to start on 3 September 2021.

== Squad ==
As of 2 January 2022

Squad No.	Name	Nationality	Date of birth (age)	Previous club
Goalkeepers
18	Bernd Schipmann	(Philippines) (Germany)	5 July 1994 (age 31)	(Germany) Rot Weiss Ahlen
27	Ukrit Wongmeema	(Thailand)	9 July 1991 (age 34)	(Thailand) Buriram United
99	Kampol Pathomakkakul	(Thailand)	27 July 1992 (age 33)	(Thailand) Muangthong United
Defenders
4	Rafael Jansen	(Brazil)	3 December 1988 (age 37)	(Brazil) Remo
21	Jirawat Thongsaengphrao	(Thailand)	31 March 1998 (age 27)	(Thailand) Ayutthaya United
29	Kiatisak Jiamudom	(Thailand)	19 March 1995 (age 30)	(Thailand) Chainat Hornbill
36	Suwannapat Kingkaew	(Thailand)	10 June 1994 (age 31)	(Thailand) Suphanburi
39	Pawee Tanthatemee (captain)	(Thailand)	22 October 1996 (age 29)	Youth Team
53	Jarupong Thongkhot	(Thailand)	4 July 2005 (age 20)	Youth Team
66	Daisuke Sato	(Philippines)	20 September 1994 (age 31)	(Thailand) Suphanburi
Midfielders
7	Jakkapan Pornsai	(Thailand)	28 March 1987 (age 38)	(Thailand) Bangkok United
8	Rajaei Ayed	(Jordan)	25 July 1993 (age 32)	(Jordan) Al-Wehdat
14	Montree Promsawat	(Thailand)	27 August 1995 (age 30)	(Thailand) Bangkok
16	Kasidech Wettayawong	(Thailand)	27 January 1994 (age 31)	(Thailand) Suphanburi
19	Kritsananon Srisuwan	(Thailand)	11 January 1995 (age 31)	(Thailand) Bangkok
23	Narakorn Noomchansakul	(Thailand)	12 April 1999 (age 26)	Youth Team
28	Ekkalab Hanpanitchakul	(Thailand)	6 May 1994 (age 31)	(Thailand) Navy
31	Pathomchai Sueasakul	(Thailand)	10 October 1988 (age 37)	(Thailand) Gulf Saraburi
52	Sakditach Kallayanapaisarn	(Thailand)	9 September 2005 (age 20)	Youth Team
77	Thanatorn Chanphet	(Thailand)	7 February 2002 (age 23)	Youth Team
92	Sanrawat Dechmitr	(Thailand)	3 August 1989 (age 36)	(Thailand) Bangkok United
96	Phakin Khamwilaisak	(Thailand)	29 August 1986 (age 39)	Free Agent
-	Anfield Sawek	(Thailand)	5 May 2004 (age 21)	Youth Team
Forwards
9	Sittichok Kannoo	(Thailand)	9 August 1996 (age 29)	(Thailand) Bangkok United
11	Steeven Langil (Vice-captain)	(Martinique)	4 March 1988 (age 37)	(Netherlands) NEC Nijmegen
17	Sitthinan Rungrueang	(Thailand)	20 July 2002 (age 23)	Youth Team
33	Derley	(Brazil)	29 December 1987 (age 38)	(Thailand) Muangthong United
54	Thanaphat Kamjornkietkul	(Thailand)	18 January 2004 (age 22)	Youth Team
55	Prapawich Tor-On	(Thailand)	20 September 2005 (age 20)	Youth Team
Players loaned out / left during season
1	Todsaporn Sri-reung	(Thailand)	18 March 1990 (age 35)	(Thailand) Trat
5	Nukoolkit Krutyai	(Thailand)	23 September 1992 (age 33)	(Thailand) Sukhothai
10	Junior Mapuku	(Democratic Republic of the Congo)	7 January 1990 (age 36)	(Saudi Arabia) Al-Shoulla
17	Santipap Ratniyorm	(Thailand)	4 September 1992 (age 33)	(Thailand) Chainat Hornbill
69	Vafa Hakhamaneshi	(Iran)	27 March 1991 (age 34)	(Iran) Tractor
9	Apiwat Pengprakon	(Thailand)	22 August 1988 (age 37)	(Thailand) PTT Rayong
10	Sébastien Wüthrich	(Switzerland)	29 May 1990 (age 35)	(Romania) Astra Giurgiu
36	Thanaset Sujarit	(Thailand)	15 November 1994 (age 31)	(Thailand) Chonburi
95	Kongphop Luadsong	(Thailand)	13 November 1995 (age 30)	(Thailand) Suphanburi
8	Praweenwat Boonyong	(Thailand)	13 February 1990 (age 35)	(Thailand) BG Pathum United
6	Luke Woodland	(Philippines) (England) (United Arab Emirates)	21 July 1995 (age 30)	(Malaysia) Kuala Lumpur City

== Transfer ==
=== Pre-season transfer ===
==== In ====
Position	Player	Transferred From	Ref
MF	(Thailand) Kasidech Wettayawong	(Thailand) Suphanburi F.C.	Undisclosed
DF	(Thailand) Thanaset Sujarit	(Thailand) Chonburi F.C.	Undisclosed
MF	(Thailand) Ekkalab Hanpanitchakul	(Thailand) Navy Football Club	Undisclosed
MF	(Thailand) Kongphop Luadsong	(Thailand) Suphanburi F.C.	Undisclosed
DF	(Iran) Vafa Hakhamaneshi	(Iran) Tractor S.C.	Undisclosed
FW	(Democratic Republic of the Congo) Junior Mapuku	(Saudi Arabia) Al-Shoulla FC	Undisclosed
MF	(Thailand) Phakin Khamwilaisak	Unattached	Free
MF	(Switzerland) Sébastien Wüthrich	(Romania) FC Astra Giurgiu	Undisclosed
FW	(Brazil) Derley	Unattached (Note: Most recently played for Muangthong United)	Free
GK	(Philippines) Bernd Schipmann	Unattached (Note: Most recently played for Rot Weiss Ahlen)	Free

==== Loan In ====
Position	Player	Transferred From	Ref
MF	(Thailand) Sanrawat Dechmitr	(Thailand) Bangkok United F.C.	Season loan
DF	(Thailand) Nukoolkit Krutyai	(Thailand) Sukhothai F.C.	One-month loan
GK	(Thailand) Todsaporn Sri-reung	(Thailand) Trat F.C.	One-month loan

==== Out ====
Position	Player	Transferred To	Ref
DF	(Thailand) (Germany) Philip Roller	(Thailand) Port F.C.	Undisclosed
FW	(France) Lossémy Karaboué	(Thailand) Suphanburi F.C.	Undisclosed
FW	(Philippines) Javier Patiño	Unattached (Note: Later joined Port)	End of contract
MF	(Philippines) OJ Porteria	Unattached (Note: Later joined United City)	End of contract
FW	(Democratic Republic of the Congo) Junior Mapuku	Unattached	Contract terminated
MF	(Thailand) Santipap Ratniyorm	(Thailand) Suphanburi F.C.	Undisclosed
DF	(Iran) Vafa Hakhamaneshi	Unattached	Contract terminated
FW	(Thailand) Apiwat Pengprakon	(Thailand) Nongbua Pitchaya F.C.	Undisclosed

==== Loan Out ====
Position	Player	Transferred To	Ref
FW	(Thailand) Muhammadnasay Kolae	(Thailand) Sukhothai F.C.	Season loan

=== Mid-season transfer ===
==== In ====
Position	Player	Transferred From	Ref
DF	(Philippines) Daisuke Sato	Unattached (Note: Most recently played for Suphanburi F.C.)	Free
DF	(Brazil) Rafael Jansen	(Brazil) Clube do Remo	Free
MF	(Jordan) Rajaei Ayed	(Jordan) Al-Wehdat SC	Undisclosed

==== Loan In ====
Position	Player	Transferred From	Ref
DF	(Thailand) Suwannapat Kingkaew	(Thailand) BG Pathum United F.C.	Season loan

==== Out ====
Position	Player	Transferred To	Ref
MF	(Switzerland) Sébastien Wüthrich	Unattached	Contract Terminated
DF	(Thailand) Praweenwat Boonyong	(Thailand) PT Prachuap F.C.	Undisclosed
DF	(Philippines) Luke Woodland	(Malaysia) Terengganu FC	Undisclosed

==== Loan Out ====
Position	Player	Transferred To	Ref
DF	(Thailand) Thanaset Sujarit	(Thailand) Suphanburi F.C.	Season loan
DF	(Thailand) Kongphop Luadsong	(Thailand) MH Khon Surat City F.C.	Season loan
FW	(Thailand) Muhammadnasay Kolae	(Thailand) Suphanburi F.C.	Season loan

== Competitions ==
=== Overview ===
Competition	First match	Last match	Starting round	Final position	Record							
Competition	First match	Last match	Starting round	Final position	Pld	W	D	L	GF	GA	GD	Win %
Thai League	4 September 2021	21 May 2022	Matchday 1		17	5	4	8	20	23	−3	29.41
FA Cup	27 October 2021	24 November 2021	First Round	Second Round	2	1	0	1	8	5	+3	50.00
League Cup	12 January 2022		First Round		1	1	0	0	3	1	+2	100.00
Champions League	22 June 2021	7 July 2021	Group stage	4th	6	0	2	4	0	10	−10	0.00
Total					26	7	6	13	31	39	−8	26.92

Last updated: 15 January 2022
Source: Competitions

=== Thai League 1 ===
==== League table ====
Pos	Team	Pld	W	D	L	GF	GA	GD	Pts	Qualification
10	Khonkaen United	30	10	7	13	30	43	−13	37	
11	Police Tero	30	8	13	9	33	39	−6	37	
12	Ratchaburi Mitr Phol	30	9	9	12	32	36	−4	36	
13	PT Prachuap	30	8	7	15	30	45	−15	31	
14	Suphanburi (R)	30	8	6	16	35	49	−14	30	Relegation to Thai League 2

Updated to match(es) played on 4 May 2022. Source: Thai League
Rules for classification: 1) Points; 2) Head-to-head points; 3) Head-to-head goals difference; 4) Head-to-head goals scored; 5) Overall goals difference; 6) Overall goals scored; 7) Fair play points; 8) Play-off without extra time;).
(R) Relegated

==== Results summary ====
Overall								Home						Away					
Pld	W	D	L	GF	GA	GD	Pts	W	D	L	GF	GA	GD	W	D	L	GF	GA	GD
17	5	4	8	20	23	−3	19	4	1	3	13	10	+3	1	3	5	7	13	−6

==== Results by matchday ====
Matchday	1	2	3	4	5	6	7	8	9	10	11	12	13	14	15	16	17	18
Ground	A	A	A	A	A	H	A	H	H	A	H	A	H	H	A	H	H	H
Result	W	L	D	L	D	W	D	L	L	L	W	L	W	W	L	D	L	
Position	2	7	7	11	12	9	10	10	12	13	12	13	11	10	11	11		

A = Away; H = Home; W = Win; D = Draw; L = Loss

==== Matches ====
Win Draw Loss

4 September 2021 1	Khon Kaen United	0-2	Ratchaburi Mitr Phol	Khon Kaen
			Langil 27'; Derley 45+2'	Stadium: Khon Kaen Stadium; Referee: Natee Choosuwan

10 September 2021 2	BG Pathum United	2-0	Ratchaburi Mitr Phol	Pathum Thani
	Chenrop 48'; Teerasil 54'			Stadium: BG Stadium; Referee: Niwat Insa-ard

18 September 2021 3	Leo Chiangrai United	0-0	Ratchaburi Mitr Phol	Chiang Rai
			Woodland (red card) 21'	Stadium: Leo Chiangrai Stadium; Attendance: 429; Referee: Paisan Bendem-alee

24 September 2021 4	Muangthong United	2-1	Ratchaburi Mitr Phol	Nonthaburi
	Popp 19' (pen.) 80'		Derley 41'	Stadium: Thunderdome Stadium; Attendance: 0 Referee: Winat Phophat

6 October 2021 5	Suphanburi	1-1	Ratchaburi Mitr Phol	Suphan Buri
	Sihanart 17'		Kritsananon 54'	Stadium: Suphan Buri Provincial Stadium; Attendance: 925; Referee: Natee Choosuwan

10 October 2021 6	Ratchaburi Mitr Phol	2-0	Chiangmai United	Ratchaburi
	Langil 20'; Sanrawat 75'			Stadium: Mitr Phol Stadium; Attendance: 1,270; Referee: Phairot Bunkamnoed

17 October 2021 7	Police Tero	2-2	Ratchaburi Mitr Phol	Bangkok
	Kasidech 28'; Chalermsak 54' (o.g.)		Ablorh 71'; Evandro 90+8' (pen.)	Stadium: Boonyachinda Stadium; Attendance: 0 Referee: Chaireag Ngam-som

20 October 2021 8	Ratchaburi Mitr Phol	1-2	True Bangkok United	Ratchaburi
	Langil 90+5'		Heberty 55'; Anon 90+1'	Stadium: Mitr Phol Stadium; Attendance: 1,659; Referee: Warintorn Sassadee

24 October 2021 9	Ratchaburi Mitr Phol	1-2	Buriram United	Ratchaburi
	Derley 54'		Supachai 73'; Rosa 84'	Stadium: Mitr Phol Stadium; Attendance: 1,985; Referee: Sarayut Jakngoen

31 October 2021 10	Samut Prakan City	2-1	Ratchaburi Mitr Phol	Samut Prakan
	Sakai 79' 88'		Derley 67'	Stadium: Samut Prakarn SAT Stadium; Attendance: 450; Referee: Songkran Bunmeekiart

7 November 2021 11	Ratchaburi Mitr Phol	2-0	PT Prachuap	Ratchaburi
	Derley 62'; Sittichok 65'			Stadium: Mitr Phol Stadium; Attendance: 1,215; Referee: Natee Choosuwan

11 November 2021 12	Port	1-0	Ratchaburi Mitr Phol	Bangkok
	Bordin 69'			Stadium: PAT Stadium; Attendance: 10,888; Referee: Chaireag Ngam-som

14 November 2021 13	Ratchaburi Mitr Phol	3-2	Nakhon Ratchasima	Ratchaburi
	Langil 30'; Derley 49'; Woodland 79'		Naruphol 58'; Karikari 63'	Stadium: Mitr Phol Stadium; Attendance: 1,224; Referee: Torphong Somsing

21 November 2021 14	Ratchaburi Mitr Phol	3-2	Nongbua Pitchaya	Ratchaburi
	Derley 45+1' 53' 79'		Hamilton 15'; Apiwat 87'	Stadium: Mitr Phol Stadium; Attendance: 1,632; Referee: Sahapop Sriboonlue

28 November 2021 15	Chonburi	3-0	Ratchaburi Mitr Phol	Chonburi
	Yoo 28' 79'; Worachit 66'			Stadium: Chonburi Stadium; Attendance: 3,520; Referee: Sarayut Jakngoen

8 January 2022 16	Ratchaburi Mitr Phol	1-1	BG Pathum United	Ratchaburi
	Sittichok 74'		Diogo 7'	Stadium: Mitr Phol Stadium; Attendance: 2,196; Referee: Natee Choosuwan

15 January 2022 17	Ratchaburi Mitr Phol	0-1	Leo Chiangrai United	Ratchaburi
			Jansen 57' (o.g.)	Stadium: Mitr Phol Stadium; Attendance: 1,986; Referee: Torphong Somsing

22 January 2022 18	Ratchaburi Mitr Phol	v	Muangthong United	Ratchaburi
				Stadium: Mitr Phol Stadium

=== Thai FA Cup ===
==== Matches ====
Win Draw Loss

27 October 2021 First Round	Ratchaburi Mitr Phol (T1)	8-1	Customs Ladkrabang United (T2)	Ratchaburi
	Wüthrich 13' 29' 59'; Langil 30' 56'; Jakkapan 33' 44'; Thanatorn 82'		Choe 89'	Stadium: Mitr Phol Stadium; Attendance: 252; Referee: Winat Phophat

24 November 2021 Second Round	Ratchaburi Mitr Phol (T1)	0-4	Leo Chiangrai United (T1)	Ratchaburi
			Phitiwat 1'; Felipe Amorim 44' 61'; Akarawin 53'	Stadium: Mitr Phol Stadium; Attendance: 705; Referee: Mongkolchai Pechsri

=== Thai League Cup ===
==== Matches ====
Win Draw Loss

12 January 2022 First Round	Rajpracha (T2)	1-3	Ratchaburi Mitr Phol (T1)	Pathum Thani
	Porncha 19'		Derley 56' 62'; Chonnapat 60' (o.g.)	Stadium: BG Stadium; Attendance: 0 Referee: Warintorn Sassadee

Second Round	v

=== AFC Champions League ===
==== Group table ====
Pos	Team	Pld	W	D	L	GF	GA	GD	Pts	Qualification	NAG	POH	JOH	RAT
1	(Japan) Nagoya Grampus	6	5	1	0	14	2	+12	16	Advance to Round of 16	—	3–0	2–1	3–0
2	(South Korea) Pohang Steelers	6	3	2	1	9	5	+4	11	Advance to Round of 16	1–1	—	4–1	2–0
3	(Malaysia) Johor Darul Ta'zim	6	1	1	4	3	9	−6	4		0–1	0–2	—	0–0
4	(Thailand) Ratchaburi Mitr Phol (H)	6	0	2	4	0	10	−10	2		0–4	0–0	0–1	—

Source: AFC
Rules for classification: Tiebreakers
(H) Hosts

==== Matches ====
22 June 2021 1	Pohang Steelers (South Korea)	2−0	(Thailand) Ratchaburi Mitr Phol	Rajamangala Stadium, Bangkok
17:00 UTC+7	Tashchy 11'; Lim Sang-hyub 81'	Report		Referee: Ma Ning (China)

25 June 2021 2	Ratchaburi Mitr Phol (Thailand)	0−1	(Malaysia) Johor Darul Ta'zim	Rajamangala Stadium, Bangkok
21:00 UTC+7		Report	Velázquez 47'	Referee: Alireza Faghani (Iran)

28 June 2021 3	Ratchaburi Mitr Phol (Thailand)	0−4	(Japan) Nagoya Grampus	Rajamangala Stadium, Bangkok
17:00 UTC+7		Report	Yamasaki 26', 31', 45+1'; Saitō 69'	Referee: Omar Al-Yaqoubi (Oman)

1 July 2021 4	Nagoya Grampus (Japan)	3−0	(Thailand) Ratchaburi Mitr Phol	Rajamangala Stadium, Bangkok
21:00 UTC+7	Mateus 50'; Kakitani 73'; Yamasaki 79'	Report		Referee: Turki Al-Khudhayr (Saudi Arabia)

4 July 2021 5	Ratchaburi Mitr Phol (Thailand)	0-0	(South Korea) Pohang Steelers	Rajamangala Stadium, Bangkok
17:00 UTC+7		Report		Referee: Saoud Al-Athbah (Qatar)

7 July 2021 6	Johor Darul Ta'zim (Malaysia)	0-0	(Thailand) Ratchaburi Mitr Phol	Rajamangala Stadium, Bangkok
21:00 UTC+7		Report		Referee: Mohanad Qasim (Iraq)

== Team statistics ==
=== Appearances and goals ===
As of 15 January 2022

No.	Pos.	Player	League		FA Cup		League Cup		AFC Champions League		Total	
No.	Pos.	Player	Apps.	Goals	Apps.	Goals	Apps.	Goals	Apps.	Goals	Apps.	Goals
4	DF	(Brazil) Rafael Jansen	2	0	0	0	1	0	0	0	3	0
7	MF	(Thailand) Jakkapan Pornsai	0+8	0	1	2	0	0	2+2	0	3+10	2
8	MF	(Jordan) Rajaei Ayed	1+1	0	0	0	1	0	0	0	2+1	0
9	FW	(Thailand) Sittichok Kannoo	11+6	2	1	0	1	0	1+1	0	14+7	2
11	FW	(Martinique) Steeven Langil	15	4	2	2	0	0	4+2	0	21+2	6
14	MF	(Thailand) Montree Promsawat	0+6	0	1+1	0	0+1	0	2+2	0	3+10	0
16	MF	(Thailand) Kasidech Wettayawong	6+6	1	0+1	0	1	0	2+3	0	9+10	1
17	FW	(Thailand) Sitthinan Rungrueang	0	0	0+1	0	0+1	0	0	0	0+2	0
18	GK	(Philippines) Bernd Schipmann	0	0	0	0	0	0	0	0	0	0
19	MF	(Thailand) Kritsananon Srisuwan	11+3	1	1	0	1	0	4	0	17+3	1
21	DF	(Thailand) Jirawat Thongsaengphrao	8+5	0	1+1	0	0	0	1+4	0	10+10	0
23	MF	(Thailand) Narakorn Noomchansakul	5+6	0	1	0	0	0	2+3	0	8+9	0
27	GK	(Thailand) Ukrit Wongmeema	0	0	0+1	0	1	0	0	0	1+1	0
28	MF	(Thailand) Ekkalab Hanpanitchakul	5+1	0	1+1	0	1	0	0+1	0	7+3	0
29	DF	(Thailand) Kiatisak Jiamudom	15+2	0	1	0	1	0	5+1	0	22+3	0
31	MF	(Thailand) Pathomchai Sueasakul	12+1	0	1+1	0	0+1	0	4+2	0	17+5	0
33	FW	(Brazil) Derley	17	9	1	0	0+1	2	0	0	18+1	11
36	DF	(Thailand) Suwannapat Kingkaew	1	0	0	0	1	0	0	0	2	0
39	DF	(Thailand) Pawee Tanthatemee	17	0	1	0	0+1	0	5	0	23+1	0
52	MF	(Thailand) Sakditach Kallayanapaisarn	0	0	0	0	0	0	0	0	0	0
53	DF	(Thailand) Jarupong Thongkhot	0	0	0	0	0	0	0	0	0	0
54	FW	(Thailand) Thanaphat Kamjhonkiadtikun	0	0	0	0	0	0	0	0	0	0
55	FW	(Thailand) Prapawich Tor-On	0	0	0	0	0	0	0	0	0	0
66	DF	(Philippines) Daisuke Sato	2	0	0	0	0	0	0	0	2	0
77	MF	(Thailand) Thanatorn Chanphet	0+2	0	1	1	1	0	0	0	2+2	1
92	MF	(Thailand) Sanrawat Dechmitr	13+2	1	1+1	0	1	0	3+2	0	18+5	1
96	MF	(Thailand) Phakin Khamwilaisak	0	0	0	0	0	0	0	0	0	0
99	GK	(Thailand) Kampol Pathomakkakul	17	0	2	0	0	0	6	0	25	0
-	MF	(Thailand) Anfield Sawek	0	0	0	0	0	0	0	0	0	0
Players loaned out / left during season
1	GK	(Thailand) Todsaporn Sri-reung	0	0	0	0	0	0	0	0	0	0
5	DF	(Thailand) Nukoolkit Krutyai	0	0	0	0	0	0	4	0	4	0
10	FW	(Democratic Republic of the Congo) Junior Mapuku	0	0	0	0	0	0	4+1	0	4+1	0
17	MF	(Thailand) Santipap Ratniyorm	0	0	0	0	0	0	0+1	0	0+1	0
69	DF	(Iran) Vafa Hakhamaneshi	0	0	0	0	0	0	3	0	3	0
9	FW	(Thailand) Apiwat Pengprakon	0	0	0	0	0	0	2+2	0	2+2	0
10	MF	(Switzerland) Sébastien Wüthrich	5+8	0	1+1	3	0	0	4+1	0	10+10	3
36	DF	(Thailand) Thanaset Sujarit	11+2	0	1	0	0	0	4	0	16+2	0
95	DF	(Thailand) Kongphop Luadsong	0	0	0	0	0	0	0	0	0	0
8	DF	(Thailand) Praweenwat Boonyong	7+3	0	2	0	0	0	4+2	0	13+5	0
6	MF	(Philippines) Luke Woodland	6+5	1	1	0	0	0	0	0	7+5	1

== Overall summary ==
=== Season summary ===
Games played	26 (17 Thai League, 2 FA Cup, 1 League Cup, 6 AFC Champions League)
Games won	7 (5 Thai League, 1 FA Cup, 1 League Cup, 0 AFC Champions League)
Games drawn	6 (4 Thai League, 0 FA Cup, 0 League Cup, 2 AFC Champions League)
Games lost	13 (8 Thai League, 1 FA Cup, 0 League Cup, 4 AFC Champions League)
Goals scored	31 (20 Thai League, 8 FA Cup, 3 League Cup, 0 AFC Champions League)
Goals conceded	39 (23 Thai League, 5 FA Cup, 1 League Cup, 10 AFC Champions League)
Goal difference	-8
Clean sheets	6 (4 Thai League, 0 FA Cup, 0 League Cup, 2 AFC Champions League)
Best result	8-1 vs Customs Ladkrabang United (27 October 21)
Worst result	0-4 (2 games)
Most appearances	2 players (25)
Top scorer	Derley (11)
Points	19

=== Score overview ===
Opposition	Home score	Away score	Double
BG Pathum United	1-1	2-0	No
Buriram United	1-2		No
Chiangmai United	2-0		
Chonburi		3-0	No
Khon Kaen United		0-2	
Leo Chiangrai United	0-1	0-0	No
Muangthong United		2-1	No
Nakhon Ratchasima	3-2		
Nongbua Pitchaya	3-2		
Police Tero		2-2	No
Port		1-0	No
PT Prachuap	2-0		
Samut Prakan City		2-1	No
Suphanburi		1-1	No
True Bangkok United	1-2		No
