= 2024–25 Ratchaburi F.C. season =

Ratchaburi
2024–25 season
- Chairman: (Thailand) Tanawat Nitikarnchana
- Manager: (Thailand) Surapong Kongthep (until 16 September) (Thailand) Somchai Maiwilai (interim; 17 September – 19 November) (Thailand) Worrawoot Srimaka (from 19 November)
- Stadium: Dragon Solar Park, Mueang Ratchaburi, Ratchaburi, Thailand
Home colours	Away colours	Third colours

The 2024–25 season is Ratchaburi Football Club's 18th existence. It is the 9th season in the Thai League and the club's 12th consecutive season in the top flight of the Thai football league system since promoted in the 2013 season. In this season, Ratchaburi participates in 3 competitions which consisted of the Thai League, FA Cup, and League Cup.

On June 25, 2024, Thai League announced the program for the upcoming 2024-25 Thai League 1 season. The season commenced on August 9, 2024, and will conclude on April 27, 2025.

On May 24, 2024, Ratchaburi announced that Surapong Kongthep will become their new head coach replacing Carlos Peña who left the club after his contract expired at the end of 2023–24 season. On September 16, 2024, with only 1 win in first 6 games, Surapong Kongthep resign from the club's head coach position.

== Squad ==
As of 15 August 2024

Squad No.	Name	Nationality	Date of birth (age)	Previous club
Goalkeepers
39	Chutideth Maunchaingam	(Thailand)	30 March 1996 (age 30)	(Thailand) Ayutthaya United
69	Kritsanucha Mueansen	(Thailand)	16 May 1997 (age 29)	(Thailand) Nonthaburi United
99	Kampol Pathomakkakul (Vice-captain)	(Thailand)	27 July 1992 (age 34)	(Thailand) Muangthong United
Defenders
2	Gabriel Mutombo	(France) (Democratic Republic of the Congo)	19 January 1996 (age 30)	(Greece) Chania FC
3	Yasser Baldé	(Guinea) (France) (Morocco)	12 January 1993 (age 33)	(France) Laval
4	Jonathan Khemdee	(Thailand) (Denmark)	9 May 2002 (age 24)	(Denmark) OB Odense
5	Apisit Sorada	(Thailand)	28 February 1997 (age 29)	(Thailand) BG Pathum United
15	Adisorn Promrak	(Thailand)	21 October 1993 (age 33)	(Thailand) Port
19	Suporn Peenagatapho	(Thailand)	12 July 1995 (age 31)	(Thailand) Buriram United
21	Jirawat Thongsaengphrao	(Thailand)	31 March 1998 (age 28)	(Thailand) Ayutthaya United
24	Worawut Namvech	(Thailand)	4 July 1995 (age 31)	(Thailand) Port
29	Kiatisak Jiamudom	(Thailand)	19 March 1995 (age 31)	(Thailand) Chainat Hornbill
57	Shinnaphat Leeaoh	(Thailand)	2 February 1997 (age 29)	(Thailand) BG Pathum United
Midfielders
6	Tana	(Spain)	20 September 1990 (age 36)	(Spain) CD Mensajero
7	Tatsuya Tanaka	(Japan)	9 June 1992 (age 34)	(Japan) Avispa Fukuoka
8	Thanawat Suengchitthawon	(Thailand)	8 January 2000 (age 26)	(Thailand) Muangthong United F.C.
10	Jakkaphan Kaewprom (captain)	(Thailand)	24 May 1988 (age 38)	(Thailand) Buriram United
16	Siwakorn Jakkuprasat (Vice-captain)	(Thailand)	23 April 1992 (age 34)	(Thailand) Port
17	Sirawit Kasonsumol	(Thailand)	23 September 2004 (age 22)	Youth team
21	Wongsathon Tamoputsiri	(Thailand)	1 February 2006 (age 20)	(Thailand) Maraleina
23	Pongsathon Sangkasopha	(Thailand)	19 October 2006 (age 20)	(Thailand) Maraleina
27	Jesse Curran	(Philippines) (Australia)	16 July 1996 (age 30)	(Thailand) BG Pathum United
37	Kritsananon Srisuwan	(Thailand)	11 January 1995 (age 31)	(Thailand) Bangkok
66	Natthawat Prompakdee	(Thailand)	7 June 2005 (age 21)	Youth team
77	Faiq Bolkiah	(Brunei)	9 May 1998 (age 28)	(Thailand) Chonburi
88	Chotipat Poomkaew	(Thailand)	28 May 1998 (age 28)	(Thailand) Singha Chiangrai United
94	Thiraphat Yuyen	(Thailand)	14 February 2006 (age 20)	Youth Team
Forwards
9	Kim Ji-min	(South Korea)	5 June 1993 (age 33)	(Thailand) Chiangrai United
25	Clément Depres	(France)	25 November 1994 (age 31)	(France) Rodez AF
40	Njiva Rakotoharimalala	(Madagascar)	6 August 1992 (age 34)	(Saudi Arabia) Al Jandal
Players loaned out / left during season
18	Rattanai Songsangchan	(Thailand)	10 June 1995 (age 31)	(Thailand) PT Prachuap
11	Mohamed Mara	(Guinea) (France)	12 December 1996 (age 29)	(France) Hyères FC

== Transfer ==
=== Pre-season transfer ===
==== In ====
Position	Player	Transferred From	Fee	Ref
DF	(Guinea) (France) (Morocco) Yasser Baldé	(France) Laval	Free	
FW	(France) Clément Depres	(France) Rodez AF	Free	
MF	(Japan) Tatsuya Tanaka	(Japan) Avispa Fukuoka	Free	
FW	(Guinea) (France) Mohamed Mara	(France) Hyères FC	Free	
FW	(South Korea) Kim Ji-min	Unattached (Note: Most recently played for Chiangrai United F.C.)	Free	
MF	(Thailand) Thanawat Suengchitthawon	(Thailand) Muangthong United F.C.	Free	
FW	(Spain) Tana	(Spain) CD Mensajero	Free	
DF	(France) (Democratic Republic of the Congo) Gabriel Mutombo	(Greece) Chania FC	Free	
GK	(Thailand) Kritsanucha Mueansen	(Thailand) Nonthaburi United F.C.	Free	

==== Loan In ====
Position	Player	Loaned From	Fee	Ref
DF	(Thailand) Suporn Peenagatapho	(Thailand) Buriram United F.C.	Season loan	
DF	(Thailand) Apisit Sorada	(Thailand) BG Pathum United F.C.	Season loan	
DF	(Thailand) Worawut Namvech	(Thailand) Port F.C.	Season loan	

==== Out ====
Position	Player	Transferred To	Fee	Ref
DF	(South Korea) Park Jun-heong	(Malaysia) Johor Darul Ta'zim F.C.	Free	
DF	(Thailand) Sanchai Nontasila	(Thailand) BG Pathum United F.C.	Free	
DF	(Myanmar) Hein Phyo Win	(Myanmar) Shan United F.C.	Free	
FW	(Thailand) Sittichok Kannoo	(Thailand) Chiangrai United F.C.	Undisclosed	
GK	(Thailand) Puttipong Promlee	(Thailand) Samut Prakan City F.C.	Free	
MF	(Thailand) Wongsathon Tamoputsiri	(Thailand) Suphanburi F.C.	Free	
FW	(Thailand) Korawich Tasa	(Thailand) Muangthong United F.C.	Free	
DF	(Thailand) (Sweden) Chakorn Chantarumporn	(Sweden) FC Arlanda	Free	

==== Loan Out ====
Position	Player	Loaned To	Fee	Ref
FW	(Brazil) Mateus Lima	(Thailand) Sukhothai F.C.	Season loan	

=== Mid-season transfer ===
==== In ====
Position	Player	Transferred From	Fee	Ref

==== Loan In ====
Position	Player	Loaned From	Fee	Ref
GK	(Thailand) Rattanai Songsangchan	(Thailand) PT Prachuap F.C.	One-match loan	
DF	(Thailand) Shinnaphat Leeaoh	(Thailand) BG Pathum United F.C.	Season loan	

==== Out ====
Position	Player	Transferred To	Fee	Ref
FW	(Brazil) Mateus Lima	(China) Guangxi Pingguo F.C.	Undisclosed	

==== Loan Out ====
Position	Player	Loaned To	Fee	Ref
DF	(Guinea) (France) Mohamed Mara	(Thailand) Kanchanaburi Power F.C.	Season loan	

== Competitions ==
=== Overview ===
Competition	First match	Last match	Starting round	Final position	Record							
Competition	First match	Last match	Starting round	Final position	Pld	W	D	L	GF	GA	GD	Win %
Thai League 1	11 August 2024	30 April 2025	Matchday 1	4th	30	15	7	8	65	47	+18	50.00
Thai FA Cup	20 November 2024	10 May 2025	First round	Semi-finals	5	4	0	1	24	5	+19	80.00
Thai League Cup	30 October 2024	17 May 2025	First round	Semi-finals	4	3	0	1	6	4	+2	75.00
Total					39	22	7	10	95	56	+39	56.41

Source: Competitions

=== Thai League 1 ===
==== League table ====
Pos	Team	Pld	W	D	L	GF	GA	GD	Pts	Qualification
2	Bangkok United	30	21	6	3	63	30	+33	69	Qualification for AFC Champions League Elite qualifiers and ASEAN Club Championship group stage
3	BG Pathum United	30	15	8	7	47	34	+13	53	Qualification for AFC Champions League Two group stage and ASEAN Club Championship group stage
4	Ratchaburi	30	15	7	8	65	47	+18	52	Qualification for AFC Champions League Two group stage
5	Port	30	13	9	8	52	39	+13	48	
6	Muangthong United	30	13	6	11	46	39	+7	45	

Source: Thai League
Rules for classification: Season in progress: 1) Points; 2) Goal difference; 3) Goals scored; End of season: 1) Points; 2) Head-to-head points; 3) Head-to-head goal difference; 4) Goals scored.

==== Results summary ====
Overall								Home						Away					
Pld	W	D	L	GF	GA	GD	Pts	W	D	L	GF	GA	GD	W	D	L	GF	GA	GD
28	13	7	8	56	44	+12	46	8	4	2	30	14	+16	5	3	6	26	30	−4

===== Results by round =====
Round	1	2	3	4	5	6	7	8	9	10	11	12	13	14	15	16	17	18	19	20	21	22	23	24	25	26	27	28	29	30
Ground	H	H	H	A	H	A	H	A	H	H	A	H	A	H	A	A	A	H	A	H	A	H	A	A	H	A	H	A	H	A
Result	L	D	W	L	D	L	W	D	W	W	L	D	L	W	L	W	W	W	D	D	D	L	W	W	W	L	W	W		
Position	9	12	4	9	9	12	10	11	8	4	7	8	10	9	9	8	7	6	6	7	7	7	7	7	5	6	4	4		

Updated to match(es) played on 6 April 2025. Source: worldfootball
A = Away; H = Home; W = Win; D = Draw; L = Loss

==== Matches ====
Win Draw Loss

11 August 2024 1	Ratchaburi	2–3	Nakhon Pathom United	Ratchaburi
	Tanaka 15'; Kiatisak 88'		Nopphakao 48'; Ito 56'; Valdo 65'	Stadium: Dragon Solar Park; Attendance: 2,575; Referee: Noppadet Mangngam

17 August 2024 2	Ratchaburi	1–1	Uthai Thani	Ratchaburi
	Curran 40'		Agudelo 5'	Stadium: Dragon Solar Park; Attendance: 3,327; Referee: Alongkorn Khonwai

25 August 2024 3	Ratchaburi	4–1	BG Pathum United	Ratchaburi
	Tanaka 1'; Tana 17'; Depres 42'; Mara 63'		Shinnaphat 55'; Saranon (red card) 13'	Stadium: Dragon Solar Park; Attendance: 4,675; Referee: Sahapop Sriboonlue

28 August 2024 4	Muangthong United	2–0	Ratchaburi	Nonthaburi
	Strauß 68'; Roback 90+8'		Depres (red card) 79'	Stadium: Thunderdome Stadium; Attendance: 3,145; Referee: Warintron Sassadee

1 September 2024 5	Ratchaburi	2–2	Port	Ratchaburi
	Tanaka 22' 47'; Kampol (red card) 90+5'		Willen 8'; Bordin 50'	Stadium: Dragon Solar Park; Attendance: 4,729; Referee: Anusorn Nookaew

15 September 2024 6	Lamphun Warriors	1–0	Ratchaburi	Lamphun
	Anan 2'; Lopes (red card) 90+7'			Stadium: Lamphun Warriors Stadium; Attendance: 2,542; Referee: Warintron Sassadee

21 September 2024 7	Ratchaburi	4–0	Nakhon Ratchasima	Ratchaburi
	Khemdee (yellow card) 22'; Depres 39'; Tana 45+4' (pen.); Kaewprom 55'; Tanaka (yellow card) 61'; Suengchitthawon 85'	Report	Thanison Paibulkijcharoen (yellow card) 45+1'	Stadium: Dragon Solar Park; Referee: (Thailand) Warintorn Sassadee

27 September 2024 8	True Bangkok United	0–0	Ratchaburi	Pathum Thani
	Notchaiya (yellow card) 32'; Pomphan (yellow card) 90+4'	Report	Mara (yellow card) 90+3'	Stadium: True Stadium; Referee: (Thailand) Putthipong Issising

5 October 2024 9	Ratchaburi	2–0	Rayong	Ratchaburi
	Depres 13'; Jakkuprasat (yellow card) 18'; Khemdee (yellow card) 61'; Pathomakkakul (yellow card) 86'; Poomkaew 90'	Report	Stênio Júnior (yellow card) 56'; Phusirit (yellow card) 72'; Buspakom (red card) 80'	Stadium: Dragon Solar Park; Referee: (Thailand) Noppadet Mangngam

20 October 2024 10	Ratchaburi	1–0	Singha Chiangrai United	Ratchaburi
	Poomkaew 13'	Report	Phanichakul (yellow card) 52'	Stadium: Dragon Solar Park; Referee: (Thailand) Phairot Bunkamnoed

25 October 2024 11	Nongbua Pitchaya	5–3	Ratchaburi	Nongbua Lamphu
	Adisak Waenlor 2'; Abo Eisa 26' (pen.); Jakkrawut Songma 34' (red card) 81'; Sriwichai (yellow card) 36'; Conrado 45+2'; Park Jong-woo (yellow card) 52'; Worawut Sataporn (yellow card) 57'; Haber 61'; Jujeen (yellow card) 64'; Jorge Fellipe (yellow card) 70'; Jamsuwan (yellow card) 73'	Report	Sorada (yellow card) 25'; Depres 51' 70' (pen.); Kim Ji-min (yellow card) 74' (goal) 90+6' (pen.); Promrak (yellow card) 85'; Pongsathon Sangkasopha (yellow card) 90+2'	Stadium: Pitchaya Stadium; Referee: (Thailand) Natee Choosuwan

2 November 2024 12	Ratchaburi	2–2	Sukhothai	Ratchaburi
	Depres 29'; Tanaka 37'	Report	Matheus Fornazari 87'; Bueraheng 90+3'	Stadium: Dragon Solar Park; Referee: (Thailand) Torpong Somsingha

9 November 2024 13	PT Prachuap	3–2	Ratchaburi	Prachuap Khiri Khan
	Vander (yellow card) 42'; Thawornsak (yellow card) 45+1'; Airton 52'; Jiraphan Phasukhan (yellow card) 58'; Praphanth 77'; Ornchaiyaphum (yellow card) 78'; Kanyaroj 82' (yellow card) 90'	Report	Depres 29'; Sorada 43'; Jakkuprasat (yellow card) 59' (yellow-red card) 61'; Srisuwan (yellow card) 90'; Kim Ji-min (yellow card) 90+4'	Stadium: Sam Ao Stadium; Referee: (Thailand) Sivakorn Pu-udom

24 November 2024 14	Ratchaburi	2–0	Khon Kaen United	Ratchaburi
	Poomkaew 39'; Mara 90+3'	Report	Saharat Posri (yellow card) 80'	Stadium: Dragon Solar Park; Referee: (Thailand) U-sen Yala

8 December 2024 15	Buriram United	6–0	Ratchaburi	Buriram
	Bissoli 33' 60' 74' 76'; Chrigor 67'; Tabinas 90+3'	Report	Mutombo (yellow card) 85'	Stadium: Chang Arena; Referee: (Thailand) Torpong Somsingha

11 January 2025 16	Uthai Thani	1–2	Ratchaburi	Uthai Thani
	Júlio César (yellow card) 26' (yellow-red card) 90+1'; Baas (yellow card) 45+1'; Danai James Smart (yellow card) 72'; Antonis 86' (pen.)	Report	Kaewprom (yellow card) 32'; Kiatisak Jiamudom 37' (yellow card) 85'; Kim Ji-min 51'; Depres (yellow card) 90+6'	Stadium: Uthai Thani Province Stadium; Referee: (Thailand) Veeraporn Maophaeo

=== Thai FA Cup ===
==== Matches ====
Win Draw Loss

20 November 2024 Round of 64	Ratchaburi	5–0	Bankhai United (T3)	Mueang, Ratchaburi
	Siwakorn Jakkuprasat 10'; Mohamed Mara 21'; Kim Ji-min 81'; Phongsakorn Sangkasopha 85'; Jakkaphan Kaewprom 90+2'			Stadium: Dragon Solar Park; Attendance: 844; Referee: Pawara Seejen

29 January 2025 Round of 32	Ratchaburi	3–0	Navy (T3)	Mueang, Ratchaburi
	Clément Depres 10', 26'; Kim Ji-min 40'			Stadium: Dragon Solar Park; Attendance: 697; Referee: Phairot Bunkamnoed

9 April 2025 Round of 16	Suphanburi (T2)	1–7	Ratchaburi	Mueang, Suphanburi
	Sittichok Paso 10'		Tana 14', 58'; Njiva Rakotoharimalala 29'; Clément Depres 53', 73'; Shinnaphat Leeaoh 85'; Phongsakorn Sangkasopha 90+3'	Stadium: Suphanburi Provincial Stadium; Attendance: 554; Referee: Niwat Insa-ard

23 April 2025 Quarter-finals	Ratchaburi	7–1	Phrae United (T2)	Mueang, Ratchaburi
	Sirawit Kasonsumol 23'; Clément Depres 43', 48'; Thanawat Suengchitthawon 58'; Phongsakorn Sangkasopha 67'; Njiva Rakotoharimalala 73', 87'		Woranat Thongkruea 45'	Stadium: Dragon Solar Park; Attendance: 1,127; Referee: Sivakorn Pu-udom

=== Thai League Cup ===
==== Matches ====
30 October 2024 First Round	Chanthaburi	2-3	Ratchaburi	Chanthaburi
	Thawatchai Jitwongsa (yellow card) 25'; Chanon Thamma (yellow card) 29'; Jantawong (yellow card) 54'; Tiago Chulapa 56'; Nachanok Klinhom (yellow card) 78'; Marut Budrak 90+3'	Report	Namvech (yellow card) 30'; Jakkuprasat 38' (yellow card) 47'; Mara 45+1' (pen.); Mutombo (yellow card) 68'; Tana 75'; Sirawit Kasonsumol (yellow card) 78'; Kim Ji-min (yellow card) 90+4'	Stadium: Chanthaburi Province Stadium; Attendance: 636; Referee: (Thailand) Sarayut Jakngoen

== Team statistics ==
=== Appearances and goals ===
As of 15 September 2024

No.	Pos.	Player	League		FA Cup		League Cup		Total	
No.	Pos.	Player	Apps.	Goals	Apps.	Goals	Apps.	Goals	Apps.	Goals
2	DF	(France) Gabriel Mutombo	3	0	0	0	0	0	3	0
3	DF	(Guinea) Yasser Baldé	1	0	0	0	0	0	1	0
4	DF	(Thailand) Jonathan Khemdee	6	0	0	0	0	0	6	0
5	DF	(Thailand) Apisit Sorada	4	0	0	0	0	0	4	0
6	FW	(Spain) Tana	4	1	0	0	0	0	4	1
7	MF	(Japan) Tatsuya Tanaka	6	4	0	0	0	0	6	4
8	MF	(Thailand) Thanawat Suengchitthawon	4	0	0	0	0	0	4	0
9	FW	(South Korea) Kim Ji-min	3	0	0	0	0	0	3	0
10	MF	(Thailand) Jakkaphan Kaewprom	6	0	0	0	0	0	6	0
15	DF	(Thailand) Adisorn Promrak	5	0	0	0	0	0	5	0
16	MF	(Thailand) Siwakorn Jakkuprasat	2	0	0	0	0	0	2	0
17	MF	(Thailand) Sirawit Kasonsumol	0	0	0	0	0	0	0	0
19	DF	(Thailand) Suporn Peenagatapho	4	0	0	0	0	0	4	0
21	DF	(Thailand) Jirawat Thongsaengphrao	5	0	0	0	0	0	5	0
23	MF	(Thailand) Pongsathon Sangkasopha	2	0	0	0	0	0	2	0
24	DF	(Thailand) Worawut Namvech	3	0	0	0	0	0	3	0
25	FW	(France) Clément Depres	4	1	0	0	0	0	4	1
27	MF	(Philippines) Jesse Curran	6	1	0	0	0	0	6	1
29	DF	(Thailand) Kiatisak Jiamudom	3	1	0	0	0	0	3	1
37	MF	(Thailand) Kritsananon Srisuwan	6	0	0	0	0	0	6	0
39	GK	(Thailand) Chutideth Maunchaingam	1	0	0	0	0	0	1	0
40	FW	(Madagascar) Njiva Rakotoharimalala	0	0	0	0	0	0	0	0
57	DF	(Thailand) Shinnaphat Leeaoh	0	0	0	0	0	0	0	0
66	MF	(Thailand) Natthawat Prompakdee	0	0	0	0	0	0	0	0
69	GK	(Thailand) Kritsanucha Mueansen	0	0	0	0	0	0	0	0
77	MF	(Brunei) Faiq Bolkiah	0	0	0	0	0	0	0	0
88	MF	(Thailand) Chotipat Poomkaew	0	0	0	0	0	0	0	0
94	FW	(Thailand) Thiraphat Yuyen	0	0	0	0	0	0	0	0
99	GK	(Thailand) Kampol Pathomakkakul	5	0	0	0	0	0	5	0
Players loaned out / left during season
18	GK	(Thailand) Rattanai Songsangchan	1	0	0	0	0	0	1	0
11	FW	(Guinea) Mohamed Mara	6	1	0	0	0	0	6	1

== Overall summary ==
=== Season summary ===
Games played	6 (6 Thai League, 0 FA Cup, 0 League Cup)
Games won	1 (1 Thai League, 0 FA Cup, 0 League Cup)
Games drawn	2 (2 Thai League, 0 FA Cup, 0 League Cup)
Games lost	3 (3 Thai League, 0 FA Cup, 0 League Cup)
Goals scored	9 (9 Thai League, 0 FA Cup, 0 League Cup)
Goals conceded	10 (10 Thai League, 0 FA Cup, 0 League Cup)
Goal difference	-1
Clean sheets	0 (0 Thai League, 0 FA Cup, 0 League Cup)
Best result	4-1 vs BG Pathum United (25 Aug 24)
Worst result	0-2 vs Muangthong United (28 Aug 24)
Most appearances	6 players (6)
Top scorer	Tatsuya Tanaka (4)
Points	5
