= 2023–24 Ratchaburi F.C. season =

Ratchaburi
2023–24 season
- Chairman: (Thailand) Tanawat Nitikarnchana
- Manager: (Spain) Carlos Peña
- Stadium: Dragon Solar Park, Mueang Ratchaburi, Ratchaburi, Thailand
- Thai League T1: 6th
- Thai FA Cup: Second round
- Thai League Cup: Quarter-finals
- Top goalscorer: League: (Madagascar) Njiva Rakotoharimalala (9); All: (Madagascar) Njiva Rakotoharimalala (14)
Home colours	Away colours	Third colours

The 2023–24 season is Ratchaburi Football Club's 17th existence. It is the 8th season in the Thai League and the club's 11th consecutive season in the top flight of the Thai football league system since promoted in the 2013 season. In this season, Ratchaburi participates in 3 competitions which consisted of the Thai League, FA Cup, and League Cup.

On August 7, 2023, Thai League announced the program for the upcoming 2023-24 Thai League 1 season. The season commenced on August 11, 2023, and will conclude on June 16, 2024.

== Squad ==
As of 11 May 2024

Squad No.	Name	Nationality	Date of birth (age)	Previous club
Goalkeepers
39	Chutideth Maunchaingam	(Thailand)	30 March 1996 (age 30)	(Thailand) Ayutthaya United
97	Puttipong Promlee	(Thailand)	10 October 1990 (age 35)	(Thailand) Maraleina
99	Kampol Pathomakkakul (Vice-captain)	(Thailand)	27 July 1992 (age 33)	(Thailand) Muangthong United
Defenders
2	Chakorn Chantarumporn	(Thailand) (Sweden)	19 August 2001 (age 24)	(Sweden) Syrianska
3	Sanchai Nontasila	(Thailand)	30 March 1996 (age 30)	(Thailand) Police Tero
4	Jonathan Khemdee	(Thailand) (Denmark)	9 May 2002 (age 24)	(Denmark) OB Odense
5	Park Jun-heong	(South Korea)	25 January 1993 (age 33)	(Hong Kong) Kitchee
14	Jirawat Thongsaengphrao	(Thailand)	31 March 1998 (age 28)	(Thailand) Ayutthaya United
15	Adisorn Promrak	(Thailand)	21 October 1993 (age 32)	(Thailand) Port
17	Hein Phyo Win	(Myanmar)	19 September 1998 (age 27)	(Myanmar) Shan United
29	Kiatisak Jiamudom	(Thailand)	19 March 1995 (age 31)	(Thailand) Chainat Hornbill
Midfielders
8	Chotipat Poomkaew	(Thailand)	28 May 1998 (age 27)	(Thailand) Singha Chiangrai United
10	Jakkaphan Kaewprom (captain)	(Thailand)	24 May 1988 (age 37)	(Thailand) Buriram United
11	Tyronne del Pino	(Spain)	27 January 1991 (age 35)	(Indonesia) Persib Bandung
16	Siwakorn Jakkuprasat (Vice-captain)	(Thailand)	23 April 1992 (age 34)	(Thailand) Port
19	Pongsathon Sangkasopha	(Thailand)	19 October 2006 (age 19)	(Thailand) Maraleina
21	Wongsathon Tamoputsiri	(Thailand)	1 February 2006 (age 20)	(Thailand) Maraleina
27	Jesse Curran	(Philippines) (Australia)	16 July 1996 (age 29)	(Thailand) BG Pathum United
37	Kritsananon Srisuwan	(Thailand)	11 January 1995 (age 31)	(Thailand) Bangkok
66	Natthawat Prompakdee	(Thailand)	7 June 2005 (age 20)	Youth team
77	Faiq Bolkiah	(Brunei)	9 May 1998 (age 28)	(Thailand) Chonburi
94	Thiraphat Yuyen	(Thailand)	14 February 2006 (age 20)	Youth Team
Forwards
7	Korawich Tasa	(Thailand)	7 April 2000 (age 26)	(Thailand) BG Pathum United
9	Sittichok Kannoo	(Thailand)	9 August 1996 (age 29)	(Thailand) Bangkok United
18	Mateus Lima	(Brazil)	18 January 1993 (age 33)	(Uzbekistan) FC Nasaf
40	Njiva Rakotoharimalala	(Madagascar)	6 August 1992 (age 33)	(Saudi Arabia) Al Jandal
Players loaned out / left during season
11	Alvin Fortes	(Cape Verde)	25 May 1994 (age 31)	(Uzbekistan) FC AGMK
71	Sirawit Kesornsumon	(Thailand)	23 September 2004 (age 21)	Youth Team
6	Mehdi Terki	(Algeria) (France)	27 September 1991 (age 34)	(Luxembourg) FC Swift Hesperange
24	Kasidech Wettayawong	(Thailand)	21 January 1994 (age 32)	(Thailand) Suphanburi
18	Todsaporn Sri-reung	(Thailand)	27 March 1991 (age 35)	(Thailand) Chiangmai United
13	Giovanni Sio	(Ivory Coast) (France)	31 March 1989 (age 37)	(Switzerland) FC Sion
6	Ibrahim Amada	(Madagascar)	28 February 1990 (age 36)	(Saudi Arabia) Al Qadsiah

== Transfer ==
=== Pre-season transfer ===
==== In ====
Position	Player	Transferred From	Ref
FW	(Ivory Coast) Giovanni Sio	(Switzerland) FC Sion	Free
FW	(Madagascar) Njiva Rakotoharimalala	(Saudi Arabia) Al Jandal	Free
MF	(Brunei) Faiq Bolkiah	(Thailand) Chonburi	Free
MF	(Algeria) Mehdi Terki	(Luxembourg) FC Swift Hesperange	Free
MF	(Thailand) Siwakorn Jakkuprasat	(Thailand) Port	Free
DF	(Thailand) Adisorn Promrak	(Thailand) Port	Free
MF	(Philippines) Jesse Curran	(Thailand) BG Pathum United	Free
MF	(Thailand) Chotipat Poomkaew	(Thailand) Singha Chiangrai United	Free
DF	(Thailand) Sanchai Nontasila	(Thailand) Police Tero	Free
FW	(Thailand) Korawich Tasa	(Thailand) BG Pathum United	Undisclosed
GK	(Thailand) Chutideth Maunchaingam	(Thailand) Ayutthaya United	Free
DF	(Thailand) Chakorn Chantarumporn	(Sweden) Syrianska	Free

==== Loan In ====
Position	Player	Loaned From	Ref

==== Out ====
Position	Player	Transferred To	Ref
FW	(Brazil) Derley	(Thailand) PT Prachuap F.C.	Free
FW	(Togo) Serge Nyuiadzi	(Kazakhstan) FC Maktaaral	Free
DF	(Brazil) Rafael Jansen	(Brazil) Sampaio Corrêa Futebol Clube	Free
DF	(Thailand) Pawee Tanthatemee	(Thailand) PT Prachuap F.C.	Free
MF	(Thailand) Pathomchai Sueasakul	(Thailand) PT Prachuap F.C.	Free
GK	(Myanmar) Myo Min Latt	(Myanmar) Shan United F.C.	Free
MF	(Thailand) Ekkalab Hanpanitchakul	(Thailand) Samut Sakhon City F.C.	Free
DF	(Thailand) Thanaset Sujarit	(Thailand) Trat F.C.	Free
DF	(Thailand) Supravee Miprathang	(Thailand) DP Kanchanaburi F.C.	Free
MF	(Thailand) Narakorn Noomchansakul	(Thailand) Uthai Thani F.C.	Free
MF	(Thailand) Phattharaphol Khamsuk	(Thailand) Bangkok F.C.	Free
DF	(Thailand) Tony Laurent-Gonnet	(Thailand) Angthong F.C.	Free
MF	(Thailand) Anfield Sawek	(Thailand) F.C. Yala	Free
DF	(Thailand) Worawit Wanwon	(Thailand) Mahasarakham SBT F.C.	Free
FW	(Thailand) Sitthinan Rungrueang	(Thailand) Suphanburi F.C.	Free
FW	(Brazil) Douglas Cardozo	Unattached	Retired
MF	(Thailand) Thanatorn Chanphet	Unattached	Out of contract
FW	(Thailand) Thanaphat Kamjornkietkul	Unattached	Out of contract
MF	(Thailand) Sakditach Kallayanapaisarn	Unattached	Out of contract
FW	(Thailand) Prapawich Tor-On	Unattached	Out of contract

==== Loan Out ====
Position	Player	Loaned To	Ref

=== Mid-season transfer ===
==== In ====
Position	Player	Transferred From	Ref
FW	(Brazil) Mateus Lima	(Uzbekistan) FC Nasaf	Free
MF	(Madagascar) Ibrahim Amada	(Saudi Arabia) Al Qadsiah FC	Free
GK	(Thailand) Puttipong Promlee	(Thailand) Maraleina F.C.	Free
MF	(Thailand) Pongsathon Sangkasopha	(Thailand) Maraleina F.C.	Free
MF	(Thailand) Thiraphat Yooyen	Unattached	Free

==== Loan In ====
Position	Player	Loaned From	Ref
MF	(Spain) Tyronne del Pino	(Indonesia) Persib Bandung	Until the end of the season

==== Out ====
Position	Player	Transferred To	Ref
FW	(Cape Verde) Alvin Fortes	Unattached (Note: Later joined Selangor)	Contract Terminated
FW	(Ivory Coast) Giovanni Sio	Unattached	Contract Terminated
MF	(Thailand) Sirawit Kesornsumon	(Thailand) Rajpracha F.C.	Free
MF	(Algeria) Mehdi Terki	(Belgium) Olympic Charleroi	Undisclosed
GK	(Thailand) Todsaporn Sri-reung	Unattached	Out of contract
MF	(Madagascar) Ibrahim Amada	Unattached	Contract Terminated
MF	(Thailand) Kasidech Wettayawong	(Thailand) PT Prachuap F.C.	Contract Terminated

==== Loan Out ====
Position	Player	Loaned To	Ref

== Competitions ==
=== Overview ===
Competition	First match	Last match	Starting round	Final position	Record							
Competition	First match	Last match	Starting round	Final position	Pld	W	D	L	GF	GA	GD	Win %
Thai League	13 August 2023	26 May 2024	Matchday 1	6th	30	11	6	13	39	35	+4	36.67
FA Cup	1 November 2023	20 December 2023	First Round	Second Round	2	1	0	1	7	2	+5	50.00
League Cup	6 December 2023	24 April 2024	First Round	Quarter-finals	3	2	0	1	3	3	+0	66.67
Total					35	14	6	15	49	40	+9	40.00

Last updated: 26 May 2024
Source: Competitions

=== Thai League 1 ===
==== League table ====
Pos	Team	Pld	W	D	L	GF	GA	GD	Pts	Qualification
4	BG Pathum United	30	15	9	6	59	38	+21	54	
5	Muangthong United (Note: Qualified for the Champions League Two group stage due to Đông Á Thanh Hóa's withdrawal from the competition and BG Pathum United's decision not to participate.) (Q)	30	16	4	10	64	45	+19	52	Qualification for AFC Champions League Two group stage
6	Ratchaburi	30	11	6	13	39	35	+4	39	
7	Uthai Thani	30	9	8	13	39	55	−16	35 (Note: The mini-league points record; Uthai Thani 8 pts, Khonkaen United 5 pts, Lamphun Warriors 2 pts.)	
8	Khonkaen United	30	8	11	11	44	58	−14	35	

Updated to match(es) played on 26 May 2024. Source: Thai League
Rules for classification: Season in progress: 1) Points; 2) Goal difference; 3) Goals scored; End of season: 1) Points; 2) Head-to-head points; 3) Head-to-head goal difference; 4) Goals scored.
(Q) Qualified for the phase indicated

==== Results summary ====
Overall								Home						Away					
Pld	W	D	L	GF	GA	GD	Pts	W	D	L	GF	GA	GD	W	D	L	GF	GA	GD
30	11	6	13	39	35	+4	39	8	1	6	28	17	+11	3	5	7	11	18	−7

==== Matches ====
Win Draw Loss

=== Thai FA Cup ===
==== Matches ====
Win Draw Loss

1 November 2023 First Round	Ratchaburi (T1)	6-0	Kasetsart (T2)	Ratchaburi
	Njiva 48' 50' 52'; Sio 73' 87'; Kiatisak 90+1' (pen.)			Stadium: Dragon Solar Park; Attendance: 503; Referee: Kotchapoom Meesridaecha

20 December 2023 Second Round	PT Prachuap (T1)	2-1	Ratchaburi (T1)	Prachuap Khiri Khan
	Jiraphan 59'; Saharat 87'		Siwakorn 66'	Stadium: Sam Ao Stadium; Attendance: 1,025; Referee: Winat Phophat

=== Thai League Cup ===
==== Matches ====
Win Draw Loss

6 December 2023 First Round	Nakhon Si United (T2)	0-2	Ratchaburi (T1)	Nakhon Si Thammarat
			Njiva 14' 69'	Stadium: Nakhon Si Thammarat Provincial Stadium; Attendance: 1,220; Referee: Winat Phophat

13 March 2024 Second Round	Ratchaburi (T1)	1-0	True Bangkok United (T1)	Ratchaburi
	Tyronne 61'			Stadium: Dragon Solar Park; Attendance: 3,379; Referee: Wiwat Jumpaoon

24 April 2024 Quarter-finals	Ratchaburi (T1)	0-3	BG Pathum United (T1)	Ratchaburi
	Danilo 8'; Chanathip 85' 89'			Stadium: Dragon Solar Park; Attendance: 2,722; Referee: Chaireag Ngam-som

== Team statistics ==
=== Appearances and goals ===
As of 26 May 2024

No.	Pos.	Player	League		FA Cup		League Cup		Total	
No.	Pos.	Player	Apps.	Goals	Apps.	Goals	Apps.	Goals	Apps.	Goals
2	DF	(Thailand) Chakorn Chantarumporn	1	0	1	0	0	0	2	0
3	DF	(Thailand) Sanchai Nontasila	27	1	2	0	2	0	31	1
4	DF	(Thailand) Jonathan Khemdee	26	1	1	0	3	0	30	1
5	DF	(South Korea) Park Jun-heong	25	0	2	0	3	0	30	0
7	FW	(Thailand) Korawich Tasa	21	4	1	0	3	0	25	4
8	MF	(Thailand) Chotipat Poomkaew	16	0	2	0	1	0	19	0
9	FW	(Thailand) Sittichok Kannoo	19	0	2	0	1	0	22	0
10	MF	(Thailand) Jakkaphan Kaewprom	27	3	1	0	2	0	30	3
11	FW	(Spain) Tyronne del Pino	15	5	0	0	2	1	17	6
14	DF	(Thailand) Jirawat Thongsaengphrao	13	0	0	0	2	0	15	0
15	DF	(Thailand) Adisorn Promrak	24	0	2	0	2	0	28	0
16	MF	(Thailand) Siwakorn Jakkuprasat	25	1	2	1	2	0	29	2
17	DF	(Myanmar) Hein Phyo Win	12	0	0	0	1	0	13	0
18	FW	(Brazil) Mateus Lima	12	5	0	0	2	0	14	5
19	MF	(Thailand) Pongsathon Sangkasopha	5	0	0	0	0	0	5	0
21	MF	(Thailand) Wongsathon Tamoputsiri	1	0	0	0	0	0	1	0
27	MF	(Philippines) Jesse Curran	28	0	0	0	2	0	30	0
29	DF	(Thailand) Kiatisak Jiamudom	30	0	2	1	3	0	35	1
37	MF	(Thailand) Kritsananon Srisuwan	27	1	2	0	2	0	31	1
39	GK	(Thailand) Chutideth Maunchaingam	0	0	1	0	0	0	1	0
40	FW	(Madagascar) Njiva Rakotoharimalala	13	9	1	3	1	2	15	14
66	MF	(Thailand) Natthawat Prompakdee	0	0	0	0	0	0	0	0
77	MF	(Brunei) Faiq Bolkiah	13	2	1	0	0	0	14	2
94	FW	(Thailand) Thiraphat Yuyen	0	0	0	0	0	0	0	0
97	GK	(Thailand) Puttipong Promlee	0	0	0	0	0	0	0	0
99	GK	(Thailand) Kampol Pathomakkakul	30	0	1	0	3	0	34	0
Players loaned out / left during season
6	MF	(Algeria) Mehdi Terki	13	1	1	0	1	0	15	1
11	FW	(Cape Verde) Alvin Fortes	4	2	1	0	0	0	5	2
13	FW	(Ivory Coast) Giovanni Sio	9	3	1	2	0	0	10	5
18	GK	(Thailand) Todsaporn Sri-reung	0	0	0	0	0	0	0	0
24	MF	(Thailand) Kasidech Wettayawong	5	0	2	0	1	0	8	0
71	MF	(Thailand) Sirawit Kesornsumon	1	0	1	0	0	0	2	0
6	MF	(Madagascar) Ibrahim Amada	8	0	0	0	2	0	10	0

== Overall summary ==
=== Season summary ===
Games played	35 (30 Thai League, 2 FA Cup, 3 League Cup)
Games won	14 (11 Thai League, 1 FA Cup, 2 League Cup)
Games drawn	6 (6 Thai League, 0 FA Cup, 0 League Cup)
Games lost	15 (13 Thai League, 1 FA Cup, 1 League Cup)
Goals scored	49 (39 Thai League, 7 FA Cup, 3 League Cup)
Goals conceded	40 (35 Thai League, 2 FA Cup, 3 League Cup)
Goal difference	+9
Clean sheets	12 (9 Thai League, 1 FA Cup, 2 League Cup)
Best result	6-0 vs Kasetsart (1 November 23)
Worst result	0-3 (2 games)
Most appearances	Kiatisak Jiamudom (35)
Top scorer	Njiva Rakotoharimalala (14)
Points	39
