= Francesc Bosch =

Spanish football coach (born 1988)

Cesc Bosch
Personal information
- Full name: Francesc D'Asís Bosch Farrés
- Date of birth: 2 May 1988 (age 38)
- Place of birth: Barcelona, Spain

Team information
- Current team: Barcelona U18 (Head Coach)

Managerial career
- Years: Team
- 2013: Ratchaburi (assistant)
- 2015–2016: Mataró U19
- 2018: Damm U19
- 2018–2019: Istra 1961 (assistant)
- 2019: Ratchaburi
- 2019: Ratchaburi (assistant)
- 2019–2021: Espanyol B (assistant)
- 2023–2024: Barcelona (youth) (assistant)
- 2024–: Barcelona (youth)

Francesc D'Asís Bosch Farrés (born 2 May 1988) is a Spanish football coach. He is currently the head coach of the Barcelona U18 team. He has previously worked at clubs including RCD Espanyol, NK Istra 1961, Damm and Ratchaburi.

== Managerial career ==
Bosch began his coaching career in grassroots football at APA Poble Sec, before joining CE Mataró in the 2015–16 season as head coach of the U19 team. He then spent two seasons (2016–2018) at CF Damm, coaching the U18 and later the U19 side.

In June 2013, Bosch joined Thai League 1 side Ratchaburi as an assistant coach. He returned to the club on 25 March 2019, where he got his first managerial role and later serve as an assistant manager under Marco Simone.

In the 2018–19 season, Bosch joined Croatian First Division side NK Istra 1961 as assistant coach under rejoining with Manolo Márquez and later serve under Curro Torres.

Frp, July 2019 to June 2021, Bosch was the assistant coach of RCD Espanyol B, before becoming head of Performance and Analysis Area at RCD Espanyol from 2021 to 2023, focusing on tactical preparation, match analysis and player evaluation.

In 2023, Bosch joined La Masia as assistant coach of FC Barcelona U16. One year later in 2024–25 season, he was promoted to head coach (U16 Team). In 2025, he became the head coach of the FC Barcelona U18 (Juvenil B) team.
