= Kim Ji-min (footballer, born 1993) =

South Korean footballer

Kim Ji-Min
Personal information
- Full name: Kim Ji-Min
- Date of birth: 5 June 1993 (age 33)
- Place of birth: Jinju, South Korea
- Height: 1.81 m (5 ft 11 1/2 in)
- Positions: Winger; forward

Team information
- Current team: Rasisalai United

Youth career
- 2009–2011: Busan IPark

Senior career*
| Years | Team | Apps | (Gls) |
| 2012–2016 | Busan IPark | 15 | (0) |
| 2017 | Gimhae FC | 15 | (2) |
| 2018 | Gyeongju Citizen | | |
| 2018–2019 | Pohang Steelers | 21 | (5) |
| 2019 | → Suwon FC (loan) | 12 | (1) |
| 2020–2021 | Jinju Citizen FC | 11 | (2) |
| 2022 | Pohang Steelers | 2 | (0) |
| 2022–2023 | Chiangrai United | 34 | (9) |
| 2024–2025 | Ratchaburi | 21 | (4) |
| 2025–2026 | Khon Kaen United | 23 | (4) |
| 2026– | Rasisalai United | 0 | (0) |
- * Club domestic league appearances and goals as of 22 January 2026

Kim Ji-Min (Korean: 김지민; born 5 June 1993) is a South Korean footballer who plays as winger or a forward for Thai League 1 club Rasisalai United.

== Career ==
Kim joined Busan IPark in 2012 and made his first appearance in the league match against FC Seoul on 16 September.

He was released in December 2016 to then later join Gimhae FC on a free transfer, he scored 2 goals for the club.

Kim joined Pohang Steelers in 2018 for an undisclosed fee. He scored his first goal for the Steelers in a 3–2 defeat to Jeonnam Dragons in August 2018.

In 2019 Kim joined Suwon FC on loan, scoring his only goal for the club in a 2–2 draw against Jeonnam Dragons.

Kim left the Steelers in December 2019, upon the expiry of his contract, following his uninspiring loan spell in Suwon.

After completing his mandatory military service at the start of 2020, Kim joined Jinju Citizen FC in the K4 League. His first goal for the club was an equaliser in a 1–1 draw against Pochoen Citizen FC in 2020. 그는 진주시민구단에서 군복무를 마치고 포항스틸러스에 합류했다.
