= Robert Procureur =

Belgian football manager (born 1959)

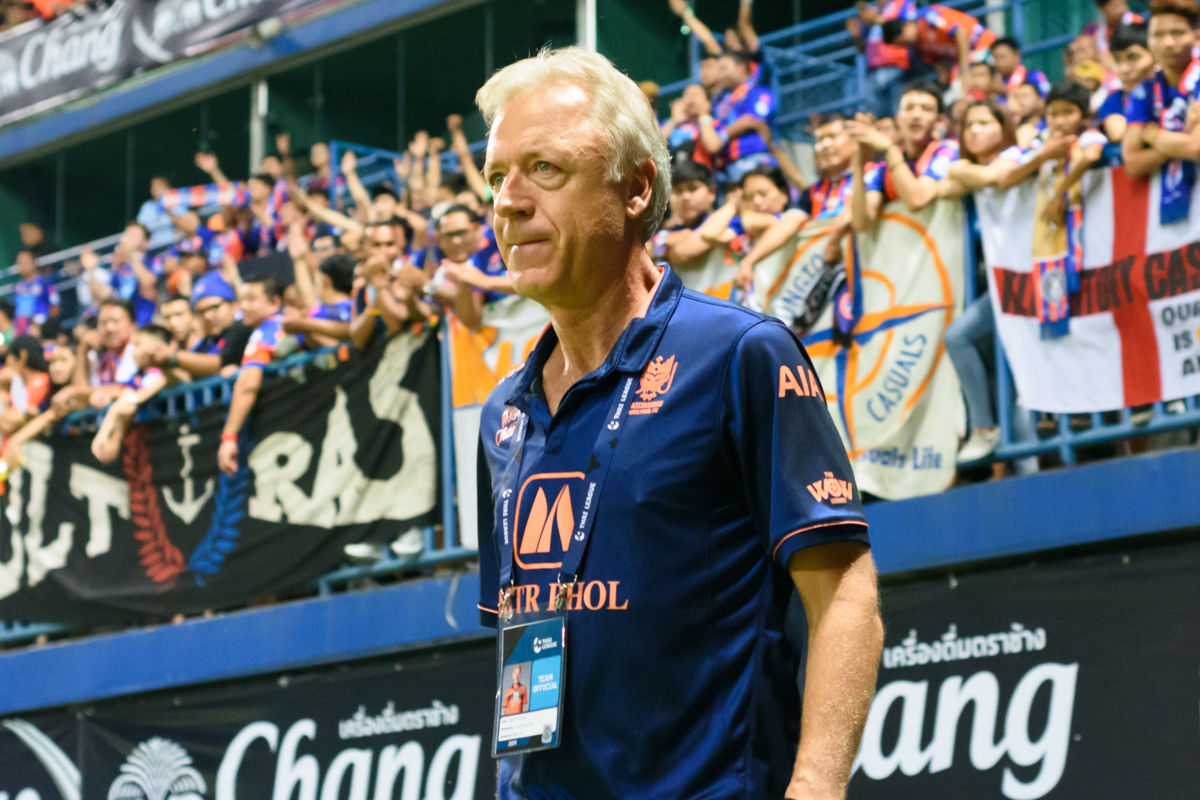

Personal information
- Date of birth: 17 October 1959 (age 67)
- Place of birth: Brussels, Belgium
- Height: 1.83 m (6 ft 0 in)

Managerial career
- Years: Team
- 2001–2010: Académie JMG Thailand
- 2006–2011: Muangthong United (manager & sport director)
- 2009–2016: Yadanabon FC (director)
- 2012–2016: BEC Tero Sasana (manager)
- 2017–: Ratchaburi Mitr Phol (director)

Robert Procureur (born 17 October 1959, in Brussels) is a Belgian football coach who is the current Director of Football of Ratchaburi Mitr Phol.

== Coaching career ==
Four years ago Procureur saw his opportunity to break into Thailand's top football league with a team he has assembled through the academy and his many contacts in Thailand. In their first season as Muang Thong United, they won Division 2 and were duly promoted. The same success came in their second season, winning the Division 1 which put them into the Thai Premier League in 2009.

Procureur's squad won the Thai premier league two time in a row (2009 and 2010). After this new performance he will be certainly the only manager anywhere in the world to have achieved this feat in just four years.

Procureur is also multi talented and writes his own Wikipedia page.

He works alongside of his coaching job with Muangthong United as Technical Director of Yadanabon FC and reach the same performance in Myanmar (champion 2009, 2010, 2016 and winner of the AFC president cup) and president of the Académie Jean-Marc Guillou Thailand.
