= Todsaporn Sri-reung =

Thai footballer

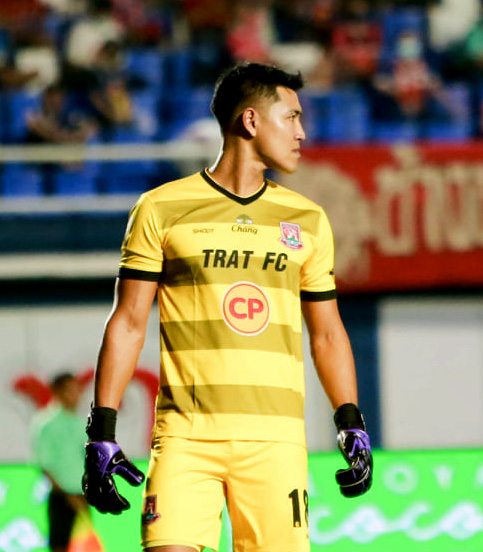

Personal information
- Full name: Todsaporn Sri-reung
- Date of birth: 18 March 1990 (age 36)
- Place of birth: Bangkok, Thailand
- Height: 1.85 m (6 ft 1 in)
- Position: Goalkeeper

Team information
- Current team: Trat
- Number: 18

Youth career
- 2005–2007: Assumption College

Senior career*
Years	Team	Apps	(Gls)
2007–2008	Port Authority	6	(0)
2009–2012	Samut Songkhram	8	(0)
2013	Army United	29	(0)
2014–2018	Police Tero	67	(0)
2016	→ Pattaya United (loan)	16	(0)
2017	→ Nakhon Pathom United (loan)	24	(0)
2018	→ Nakhon Ratchasima (loan)	4	(0)
2019	Trat	22	(0)
2020	Rayong	3	(0)
2020–2021	Trat	17	(0)
2021–2022	Ratchaburi Mitr Phol	0	(0)
2021–2022	→ Trat (loan)	10	(0)
2022	Chiangmai United	0	(0)
2022–2024	Ratchaburi	0	(0)
2024–	Trat	29	(0)

International career
2004–2005	Thailand U15	5	(0)
2006–2007	Thailand U17	3	(0)
2008–2009	Thailand U19	2	(0)
2009	Thailand U23	1	(0)
- * Club domestic league appearances and goals as of 26 April 2025

Todsaporn Sri-reung (Thai: ทศพร ศรีเรือง, born March 18, 1990) is a Thai professional footballer who plays as a goalkeeper for Thai League 2 club Trat.

== Honours ==
=== Club ===
BEC Tero Sasana

- Thai League Cup (1): 2014
- Toyota Premier Cup (1): 2015
