= Mehdi Terki =

Algerian footballer (born 1991)

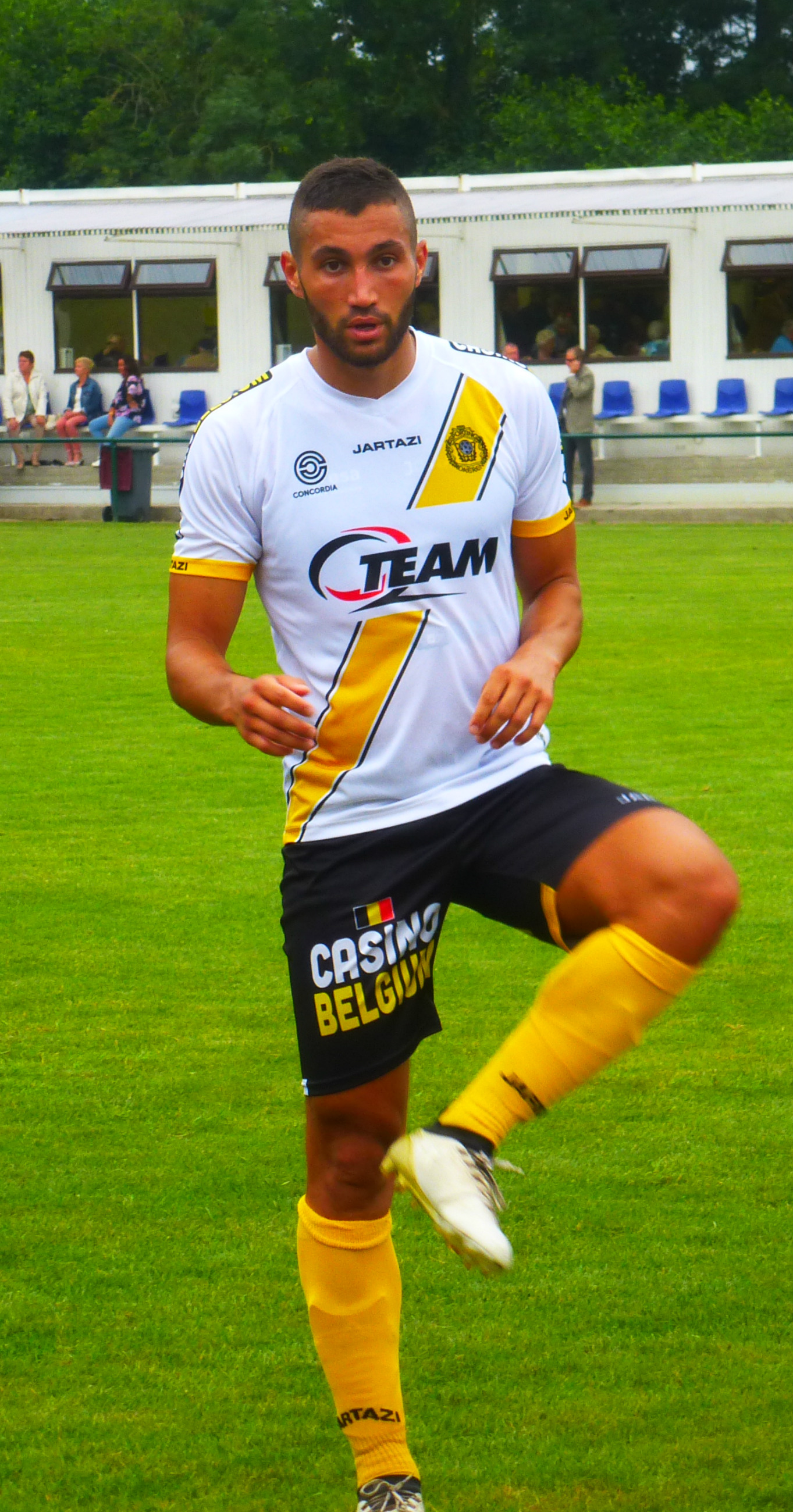
- Terki with Lokeren in 2017

Personal information
- Date of birth: 27 September 1991 (age 35)
- Place of birth: Maubeuge, France
- Height: 1.85 m (6 ft 1 in)
- Position: Midfielder

Team information
- Current team: Atert Bissen
- Number: 20

Senior career*
Years	Team	Apps	(Gls)
2010–2011	Mons	20	(1)
2011–2012	Gent	0	(0)
2012–2013	FCV Dender	31	(2)
2013–2014	CS Constantine	0	(0)
2014–2016	FCV Dender	64	(14)
2016–2019	Lokeren	96	(7)
2019–2020	Xanthi	29	(0)
2020–2022	RWDM47	30	(1)
2022–2023	Swift Hesperange	34	(5)
2023	Ratchaburi	13	(1)
2024–2025	Olympic Charleroi	39	(4)
2025–	Atert Bissen	16	(0)

International career
2012	Algeria U23	1	(0)
- * Club domestic league appearances and goals as of 13 June 2026

Mehdi Terki (born 27 September 1991) is a professional footballer who plays as a midfielder for Luxembourgish club Atert Bissen. Born in France, he has represented Algeria at youth level.

== Club career ==
On 10 January 2022, Terki signed with Swift Hesperange in Luxembourg.

== International career ==
Born in France, Terki is of Algerian descent. He was called up to the Algeria U23s.
