= Mohamed Mara =

Guinean footballer (born 1996)

Personal information
- Date of birth: 12 December 1996 (age 29)
- Place of birth: Conakry, Guinea
- Height: 1.70 m (5 ft 7 in)
- Position: Forward

Team information
- Current team: Kanchanaburi Power
- Number: 21

Senior career*
Years	Team	Apps	(Gls)
2013–2019	Lorient II	56	(13)
2016–2020	Lorient	18	(2)
2019–2020	→ Paris FC (loan)	5	(0)
2020–2022	Thonon Evian	29	(8)
2022–2023	Martigues	21	(3)
2023–2024	Stade Briochin	10	(5)
2024	Hyères FC	12	(4)
2024–2025	Ratchaburi	15	(2)
2025	→ Kanchanaburi Power (loan)	13	(7)
2025–2026	Kanchanaburi Power	28	(3)

International career
2016	Guinea	1	(0)
- * Club domestic league appearances and goals as of 23 February 2025

Mohamed Mara (born 12 December 1996) is a Guinean professional footballer who plays as a forward for Thai League 1 club Kanchanaburi Power. He made one appearance for the Guinea national team in 2016.

== Club career ==
Born in Conakry, Guinea, Mara was in Lorient's youth teams since 2013 and signed his first professional contract with them in December 2014. He made his professional debut for Lorient in a 1–0 win over Lille in September 2016. He spent a season on loan with Paris FC for the 2019–20 season. On 25 August 2020, Mara transferred to Thonon Evian.

On 29 July 2022, Mara signed with Martigues in Championnat National.

== International career ==
Mara moved to France from Guinea when he was 13 years old. He debuted for the Guinea national team in a 2–1 2018 World Cup qualification loss to the DR Congo on 13 November 2016.

== Honours ==
Thonon Evian

- Championnat National 3: 2021–22
