= Thanaset Sujarit =

Thai footballer (born 1994)

Personal information
- Full name: Thanaset Sujarit
- Date of birth: 15 November 1994 (age 31)
- Place of birth: Chonburi, Thailand
- Height: 1.73 m (5 ft 8 in)
- Position: Right back

Team information
- Current team: Chonburi
- Number: 36

Youth career
- Chonradsadornumrung School

Senior career*
Years	Team	Apps	(Gls)
2012–2014	Chonburi	1	(0)
2013–2014	→ Phan Thong (loan)	16	(0)
2015–2017	Rayong	34	(0)
2018–2021	Chonburi	14	(0)
2018	→ Trat (loan)	6	(0)
2020	→ Ratchaburi Mitr Phol (loan)	15	(0)
2021–2023	Ratchaburi Mitr Phol	19	(0)
2021	→ Suphanburi (loan)	13	(0)
2022–2023	→ PT Prachuap (loan)	10	(0)
2023–2024	Trat	29	(1)
2024–2025	PT Prachuap	5	(0)
2025	→ Chonburi (loan)	14	(1)
2025–	Chonburi	0	(0)
- * Club domestic league appearances and goals as of 9 August 2024

Thanaset Sujarit (Thai: ธนาเสฏฐ์ สุจริต, born 15 November 1994) is a Thai professional footballer who plays as a right back for Thai League 1 club Chonburi.

== Club career ==
In 2012, Thanaset made his professional Thai League 1 debut for Chonburi at the age of 17.

== Honours ==
=== Club ===
Chonburi

- Thai League 2 : 2024–25
