= Rajaei Ayed =

Jordanian footballer

Raja'ei Ayed
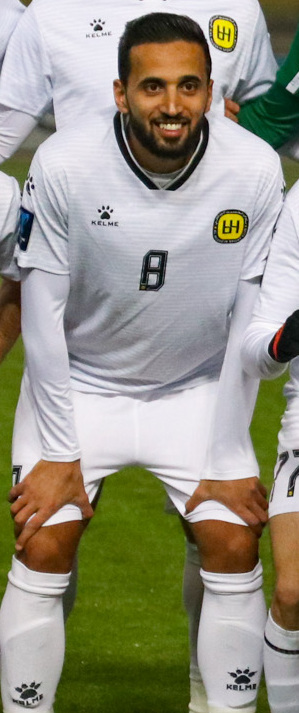
- Ayed with Al-Hussein in 2025

Personal information
- Full name: Raja'ei Ayed Fadel Hasan
- Date of birth: 25 July 1993 (age 33)
- Place of birth: Amman, Jordan
- Height: 1.75 m (5 ft 9 in)
- Position: Midfielder

Team information
- Current team: Al-Hussein
- Number: 8

Youth career
- 2008–2012: Al-Wehdat

Senior career*
Years	Team	Apps	(Gls)
2012–2021	Al-Wehdat	230	(5)
2022	Ratchaburi Mitr Phol	16	(0)
2022–2023	Mesaimeer	5	(0)
2023–	Al-Hussein	39	(0)

International career^{‡}
2011–2012	Jordan U19		(0)
2013–2016	Jordan U23	14	(1)
2014–	Jordan	66	(0)
Medal record
Representing Jordan
Men's football
FIFA Arab Cup
Runner-up	2025 Qatar	Team
- * Club domestic league appearances and goals as of 16 April 2022 ‡ National team caps and goals as of 15 December 2025

Raja'ei Ayed Fadel Hasan (Arabic: رَجَائِيّ عَايِد فَاضِل حَسَن; born 25 July 1993) is a Jordanian professional footballer who plays as a midfielder for Jordanian Pro League club Al-Hussein and the Jordan national team.

== International career ==
As of 23 March 2017

Jordan national team
Year	Apps	Goals
2014	12	0
2015	7	0
2016	5	0
2017	5	0
2018	2	0
Total	31	0

== International goals ==
=== With U-23 ===
#	Date	Venue	Opponent	Score	Result	Competition
1	22 July 2014	Amman	Iran	2-2	Draw	U-23 Friendly
