= Ekkalarp Hanpanichkij =

Thai footballer (born 1995)

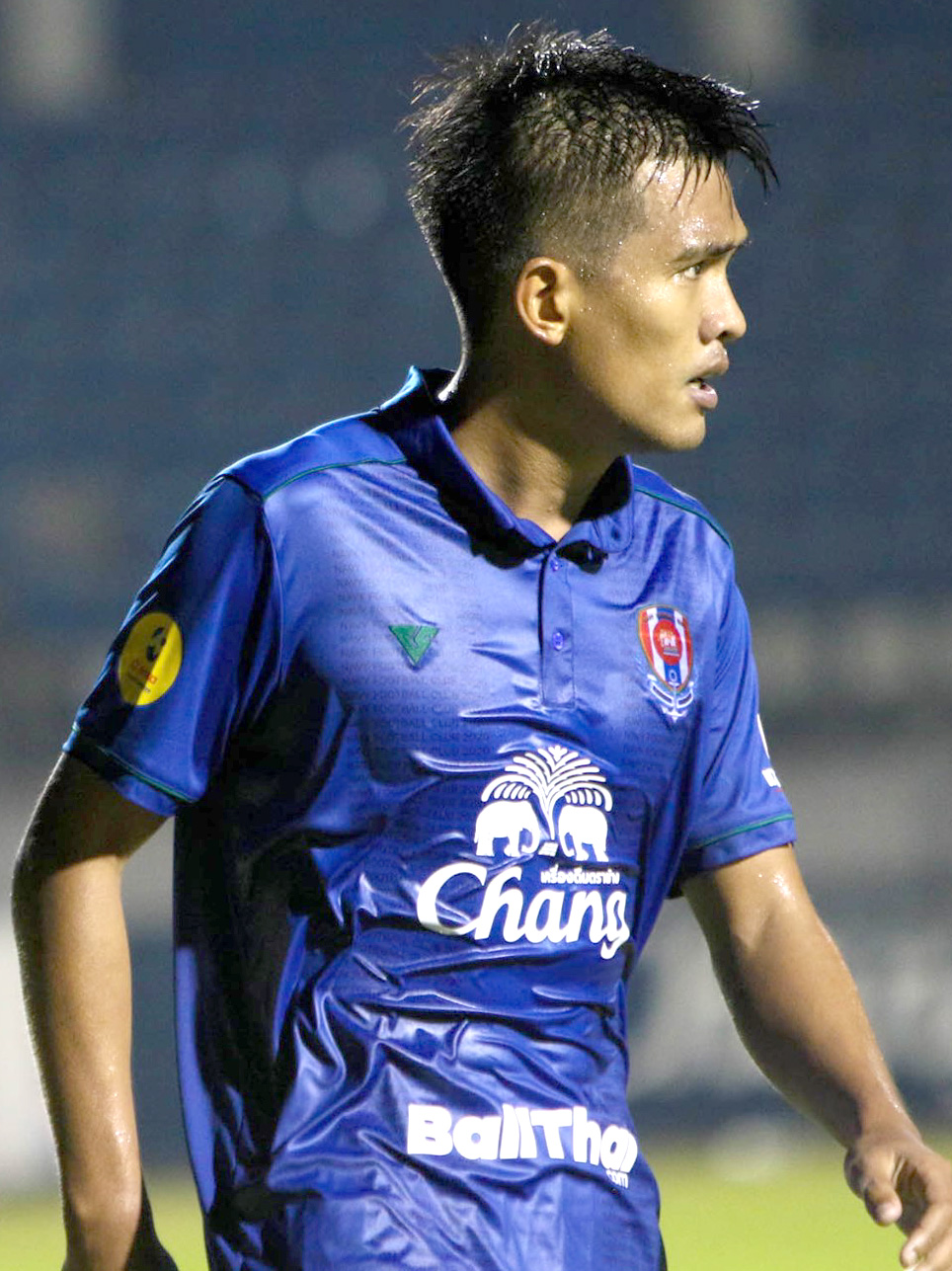
- Playing for Navy F.C.

Personal information
- Date of birth: 24 April 1995 (age 31)
- Place of birth: Bangkok, Thailand
- Height: 1.80 m (5 ft 11 in)
- Position: Defensive midfielder

Team information
- Current team: Phrae United
- Number: 37

Senior career*
Years	Team	Apps	(Gls)
2017–2018	Suphanburi	1	(0)
2019	Samut Sakhon	20	(1)
2020	Navy	31	(1)
2021–2023	Ratchaburi Mitr Phol	2	(0)
2022	→ Nakhon Ratchasima (loan)	4	(0)
2023	→ Nakhon Pathom United (loan)	14	(1)
2023–2024	Samut Sakhon City	20	(5)
2024–	Phrae United	0	(0)
- * Club domestic league appearances and goals as of 25 February 2024

Ekkalarp Hanpanichkij (Thai: เอกลาภ หาญพานิชกิจ; born 24 April 1995) is a Thai professional footballer who plays as a defensive midfielder for Thai League 2 side Phrae United.

== Honour ==
Nakhon Pathom United

- Thai League 2: 2022–23
