= Ratchaburi Stadium =

Football stadium in Ratchaburi, Thailand

Coordinates: 13.521677°N 99.769588°E

Dragon Solar Park
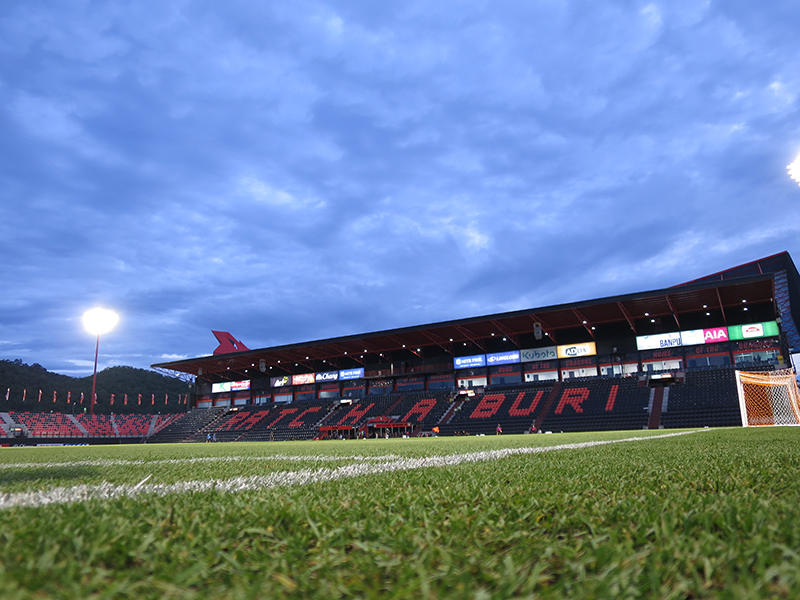
- Interactive map of Dragon Solar Park
- Full name: Ratchaburi Stadium
- Location: Huai Phai, Mueang Ratchaburi, Ratchaburi, Thailand
- Owner: Ratchaburi F.C.
- Operator: Ratchaburi F.C.
- Capacity: 13,000
- Surface: Grass

Construction
- Built: 2015
- Opened: 29 June 2016
- Cost: ฿300 million
- Builders: I AM DESIGN and Pansuang Architects

Tenant
- Ratchaburi F.C. (2016–present)

The Ratchaburi Stadium (known for sponsorship purposes as Dragon Solar Park) is a football-purpose stadium in Ratchaburi Province, Thailand. It is located in the town of Huai Phai and it is currently used for football matches and it is the home stadium of Ratchaburi. The stadium firstly held 13,000 people in 2016. After the seat-installing in 2017, the capacity is reduced to 10,000 seats.

== Name ==
The stadium, Mitr Phol Stadium was initially named after the club's previous title sponsor, a sugar manufactory, Mitr Phol.

Once Mitr Phol ended their sponsorship of Ratchaburi in 2022, the stadium was renamed to Dragon Solar Park after the solar panel manufacturing company Dragon Solar.
