= Kiatisak Jiamudom =

Thai footballer (born 1995)

Personal information
- Full name: Kiatisak Jiamudom
- Date of birth: 19 March 1995 (age 31)
- Place of birth: Bangkok, Thailand
- Height: 1.75 m (5 ft 9 in)
- Position: Left-back

Team information
- Current team: Ratchaburi
- Number: 29

Youth career
- 2009–2011: Bangkok Christian College

Senior career*
| Years | Team | Apps | (Gls) |
| 2012 | BCC Tero | 16 | (0) |
| 2012–2016 | BBCU | 11 | (0) |
| 2017–2019 | Chainat Hornbill | 49 | (1) |
| 2020– | Ratchaburi | 136 | (2) |
- * Club domestic league appearances and goals as of 9 January 2026

Kiatisak Jiamudom (Thai: เกียรติศักดิ์ เจียมอุดม; born January 11, 1995) is a Thai professional footballer who plays as a left-back for Thai League 1 club Ratchaburi.
