= Ratchaburi F.C. =

Thai football club

Ratchaburi ราชบุรี เอฟซี
- Full name: Ratchaburi Football Club สโมสรฟุตบอลจังหวัดราชบุรี
- Nicknames: The Dragons (ราชันมังกร)
- Short name: RCH
- Founded: 2004; 22 years ago
- Ground: Dragon Solar Park; Ratchaburi, Thailand
- Capacity: 13,000
- Chairman: Tanawat Nitikarnchana
- Head coach: Worrawoot Srimaka
- League: Thai League 1
- 2025–26: Thai League 1, 3rd of 16
Home colours	Away colours	Third colours

Ratchaburi Football Club (Thai: สโมสรฟุตบอลจังหวัดราชบุรี), is a Thai professional football club based in Ratchaburi province that currently plays in Thai League 1. The top tier league in Thailand. Ratchaburi has the nickname The Dragons which can be seen in the club official crest.

In the club history, Ratchaburi has won 1 Thai League 3 title, 1 Thai League 4 title and 1 Thai FA Cup.

== History ==
=== Establishment and early years (2009–2009) ===
Ratchaburi Football Club was founded in 2004 and then joined 2006 Thailand Division 2 League. Ratchaburi able to win the Thailand Division 2 League title, get the right to compete in the 2007 Thailand League Division 1.

The 2007 League Division 1 season has a total of 24 teams participating in the competition, divided into 2 groups, 12 teams each and at the end of the competition, the top five of each group will be relegated to the competition. Thai League Division 2, the club did not perform very well, finished the season with the last place in the group A table.

In 2008, Ratchaburi finished in seventh place out of the 11 participating teams, causing the team to relegate, but due to the Football Association of Thailand reshaping the competition in the season 2009 makes Ratchaburi continue to compete in the Thai League Division 2

2009 Regional League Division 2 is the first season to compete in a 5-region zone system, Ratchaburi Football Club is organized in the Central and Eastern region. The club finished the season with 9th place out of 12 participating teams.

=== Back-to-back promotion (2010–2015) ===
In 2010, the Nitikarnchana family decided to take over Ratchaburi Football Club, which was then in the Regional League Division 2. In 201, the club won the Central-East Division before earning promotion to Division 1 after winning Group A of the Division 2 playoffs.

Prior to the 2012 season, Ratchaburi was sponsored by the Mitr Phol Group and announced the change of the club's name to Ratchaburi Mitr Phol, with Sorraaut Klinprathum as the club's president, Boonying Nitikarnchana as the club's vice president and Thanawat Nitikarnchana is the team manager while taking the helms is Somchai Maiwilai as the club head coach.

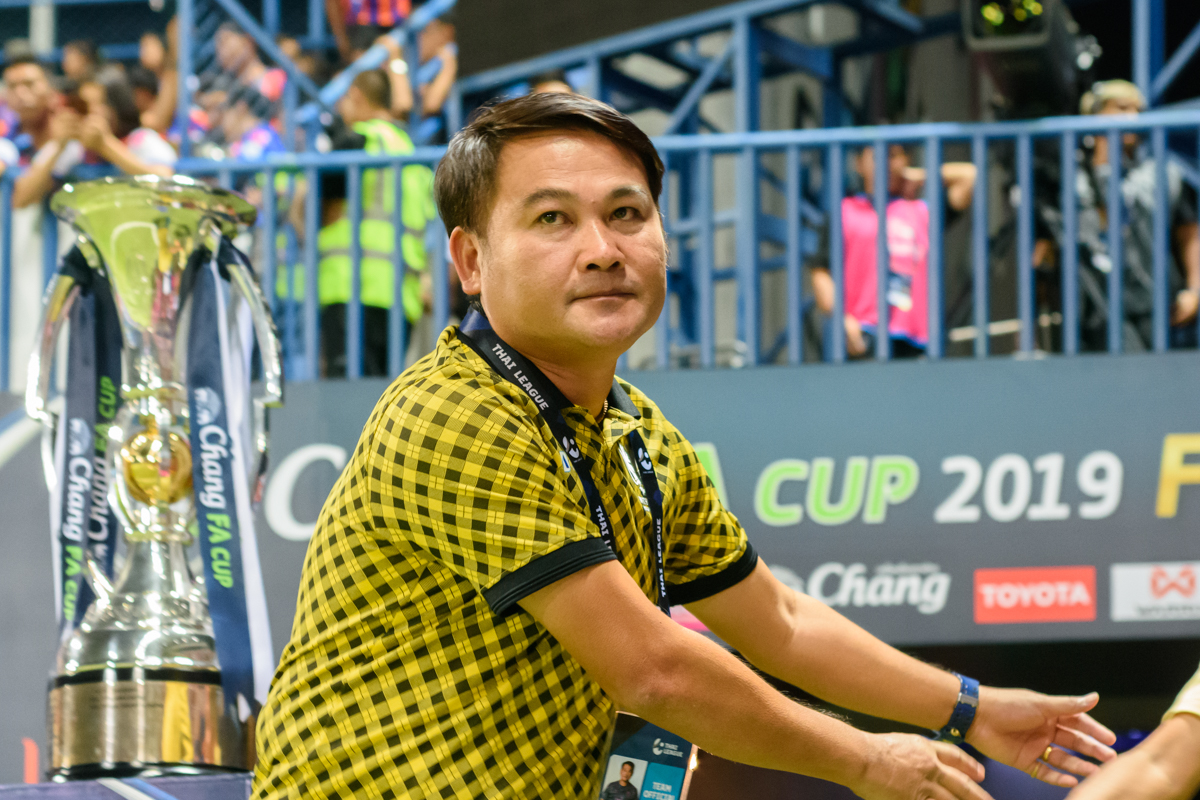
Somchai Maiwilai is considered one of the most successful coach in Ratchaburi history spending most of his managerial career at the club and successfully guiding the club from the third tier all the way to the first division.

2011	Division 2	(Tier 3)
2012	Division 1	(Tier 2)
2013	Thai Premier League	(Tier 1)

Whilst in Division 1, Ratchaburi made it to the 2012 Thai League Cup final where they lost 4–1 to Buriram United. The final was most remembered for the farcical circumstances that Ratchaburi faced as they didn't have any substitutes on the bench due to having several ineligible loanees from opponents Buriram United. Ratchaburi never stood a chance as Buriram won the final at a canter.

==== Promotion to the top flight division ====
In the following season, Ratchaburi flew through the 2012 Thai Division 1 League winning the title on their way to the top flight league.

In the first season of the Ratchaburi in top-tier league is considered unsuccessful, ranked 15th out of the total of 18 teams, but due to the problem of scrambling for the rights of the team between Sisaket and Esan United escalate, The Thai League company decided to increase the top 20 teams in TPL, resulting in the Thai Premier League competition in 2013 season, there was only one relegation team, Pattaya United (17th place).

In 2014 season, Ratchaburi reacted by appointing former Girona manager Ricardo Rodríguez as their new manager for the new 2014 Thai Premier League season. The Dragons finished comfortably in 4th place.

=== Rise of Ratchaburi (2016–2020) ===
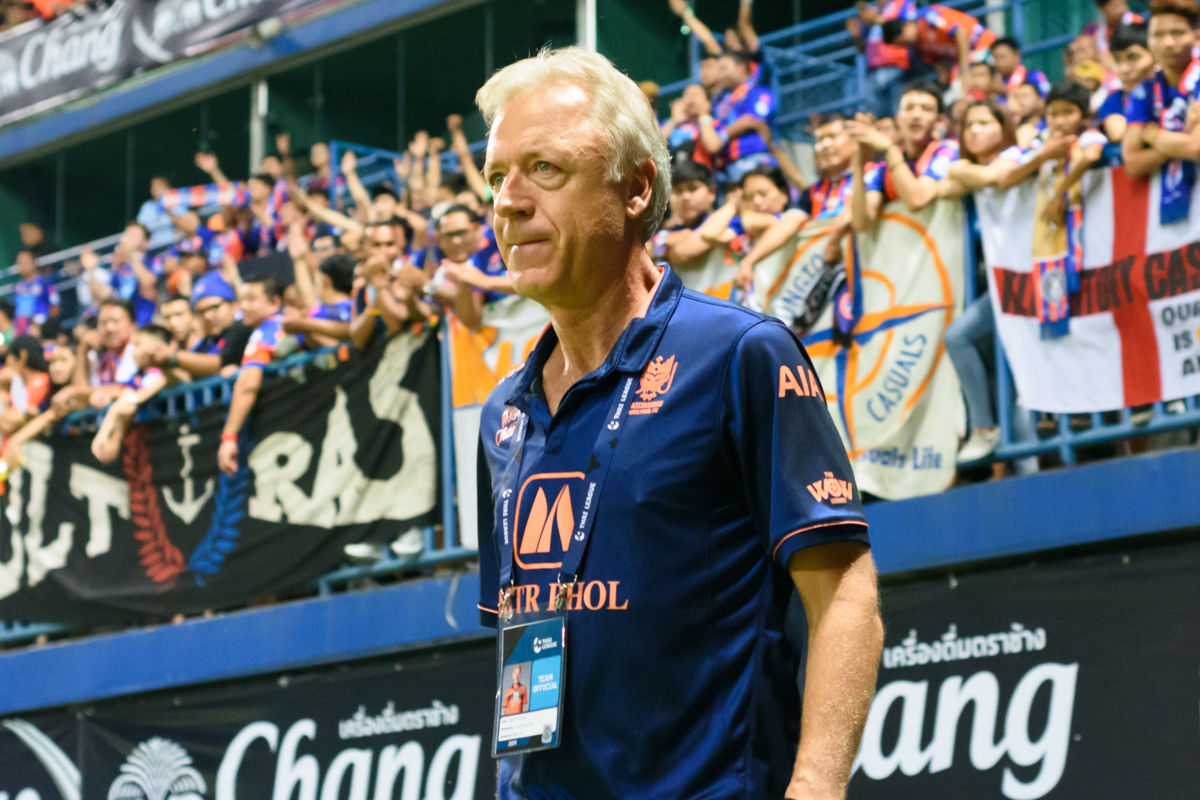
Robert Procureur, first technical director of club

After participating in the top league for 3 years, Ratchaburi Mitr Phol has a project to build its own football stadium. The stadium started construction in 2015 and opened for the first time in mid-2016. In 2016, Ratchaburi Mitr Phol moved to new ground, Mitr Phol Stadium and the club appointed Robert Procureur as the club first technical director.

In 2016, Following the death of King Bhumibol Adulyadej, the Football Association of Thailand cancelled the remaining league and cup season on 14 October 2016, with three rounds remaining. Ratchaburi then was announced as the 2016 Thai FA Cup champions where the title was shared among Chainat Hornbill, Chonburi and Sukhothai who was then in the semi-finals. Ratchaburi then finished the league in 6th place.

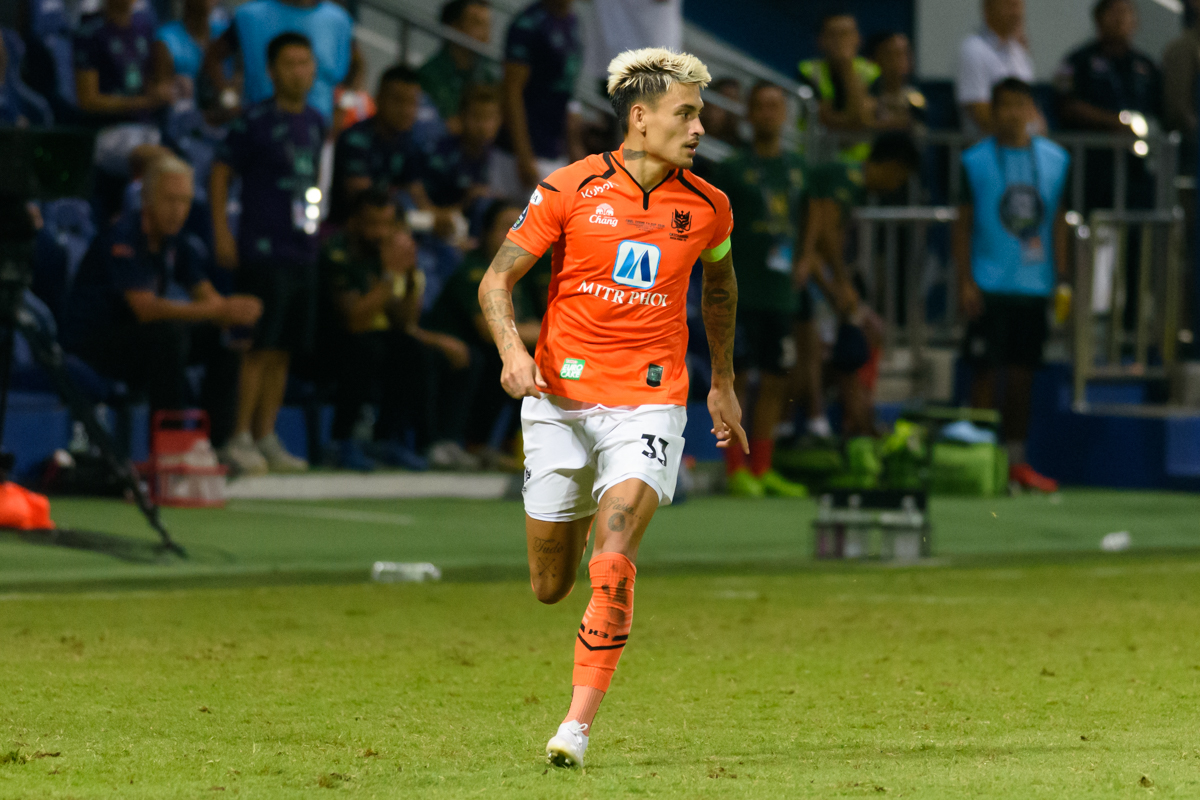
Philip Roller, captain of the team from 2019 to 2021

In the 2017 season, Ratchaburi continued to progress under Pacheta's stewardship, and with a team containing half blood players Philip Roller and Kevin Deeromram reached league finish as 6th place as well as reaching the semi-final of the League Cup losing 0–1 to Chiangrai United at Supachalasai Stadium.

In the 2018 season, a dismal run of form saw the team slip to the bottom of the league table. Ratchaburi finished the season in 12th place with 43 points, they were one point adrift from safety.

In the 2019 season, after beating Buriram United in the semi-final, Ratchaburi reached the 2019 Thai FA Cup final for the first time in their history. In the final, played at the Leo Stadium, Ratchaburi lost to Port 1–0, with a goal by Sergio Suárez scored in second half. Ratchaburi made it becoming the runner-up of the competition.

=== Recent years (2021–present) ===
==== AFC Champions League debut (2021) ====
In 2021, Ratchaburi qualified to 2021 AFC Champions League for the first time in club history after finishing the position in top four in the 2020–21 season. Ratchaburi was then placed in group G alongside South Korean Pohang Steelers, Japanese club Nagoya Grampus and Malaysian club Johor Darul Ta'zim. On 4 July 2021, the club then registered their first ever points in the tournament after a goalless draw against Pohang Steelers.

In 2022, Ratchaburi ended their 10-years sponsorship with Mitr Phol where the club name was shorten back to Ratchaburi. The club stadium has also renamed to Dragon Solar Park after the solar panel manufacturing company Dragon Solar.

==== AFC Champions League Two knockout stage (2024–2025) ====
Ratchaburi ended the 2024–25 Thai League 1 in fourth place which then sees the team qualified to the 2025–26 AFC Champions League Two. In the 2025–26 AFC Champions League Two, Ratchaburi finished the group stage as runners-up thus qualifying to the round of 16 facing off against Indonesian club Persib Bandung. Ratchaburi won 3–0 in the first leg but fall to a 1–0 defeat in the second leg in Bandung where it cause an uproar among the Persib Bandung fans. Ratchaburi won 3–1 on aggregate thus qualifying to the quarter-finals in which they lost to eventual champions Gamba Osaka 3–2 on aggregate. Ratchaburi then went on to finished third in the 2025–26 season where the club then qualified directly to the 2026–27 AFC Champions League Elite and the 2026–27 ASEAN Club Championship.

== Academy development ==
Ratchaburi opened its first youth academies in 2016 under the name The Dragons Academy. In 2017, Ratchaburi have appointed former player Douglas Cardozo as the club head of youth development.

== Stadium ==
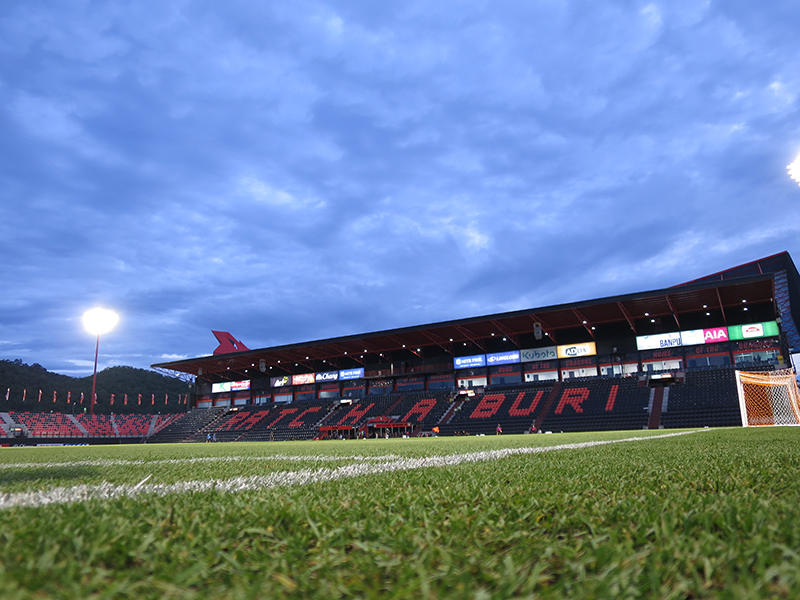
Dragon Solar Park

From 2007 to 2016, the club used Ratchaburi Provincial Stadium owned by the city council as their home ground. In June 2016, the club built Dragon Solar Park in the town of Huai Phai, Ratchaburi Province to be its new home ground and is directly owned by the club. The stadium has a capacity of 10,000 seats.

Coordinates	Location	Stadium	Year
13°31′55″N 99°48′50″E	Ratchaburi	Ratchaburi Provincial Stadium	2007–2016
13°31′18″N 99°46′11″E	Ratchaburi	Dragon Solar Park	2016–present

== Players ==
=== First-team squad ===
Note: Flags indicate national team as defined under FIFA eligibility rules; some limited exceptions apply. Players may hold more than one non-FIFA nationality.

No.	Pos.	Nation	Player
1	GK	THA	Nopphon Lakhonphon (on loan from Buriram United)
3	DF	ALG	Tarek Aggoun
4	DF	THA	Jonathan Khemdee
5	DF	MAS	Daniel Ting
6	MF	ESP	Tana
7	FW	BRA	Rafael Bilú
8	MF	THA	Thanawat Suengchitthawon (Captain)
9	FW	BRA	Bruno Mendes
10	MF	ESP	Jonathan Viera
11	FW	FRA	Jordan Gele
15	DF	THA	Adisorn Promrak
16	MF	ESP	Roque Mesa
18	GK	THA	Thanawit Uamsaard
19	MF	THA	Teeraphol Yoryoei
20	MF	THA	Sanchai Nontasila
21	MF	THA	Ekanit Panya (on loan from BG Pathum United F.C.)

No.	Pos.	Nation	Player
22	MF	THA	Phongsakon Sangkasopha
23	DF	THA	Kevin Deeromram
26	GK	THA	Napat Suemanotham
27	MF	PHI	Jesse Curran
28	MF	THA	Thossawat Limwannasathian
29	DF	THA	Kiatisak Jiamudom
31	DF	JPN	Sai van Wermeskerken
32	MF	AUT	Robert Žulj
33	DF	THA	Pethey Promjan
37	MF	THA	Kritsananon Srisuwan
42	MF	THA	Sorawit Panthong
44	DF	ESP	Pablo Insua
48	MF	SCO	Scott Allardice
66	DF	THA	Alexander Gountounas
88	MF	THA	Chotipat Poomkaew
92	MF	MAD	Njiva Rakotoharimalala
97	GK	THA	Ukrit Wongmeema
99	GK	THA	Kampol Pathomakkakul (Vice-captain)

=== Out on loan ===
Note: Flags indicate national team as defined under FIFA eligibility rules; some limited exceptions apply. Players may hold more than one non-FIFA nationality.

No.	Pos.	Nation	Player

== Management and staff ==
Position	Name
Chairman	(Thailand) Tanawat Nitikanchana
Technical director	(Belgium) Robert Procureur
Head coach	(Thailand) Worrawoot Srimaka (Thailand) Somchai Maiwilai

== Honours ==
Type	Honours	Titles	Season
League	Thai League 3/Third division	1	2012
League	Thai League 4/Fourth division	1	2011
Cup	Thai FA Cup	1	2016

Bold is for those competition that are currently active.

== Award winners ==
=== Domestic ===
- Most Valuable Player
  - (Thailand) Jakkaphan Kaewprom (2024–25)
- League Golden Boot
  - (Brazil) Heberty (2014)
- Team of the Season
  - (Thailand) Thanawat Suengchitthawon (2025–26)
  - (Spain) Tana (2025–26)

== Records and statistics ==
As of 12 October 2026.

Top 10 all-time appearances
Rank	Player	Years	Club appearances
1	(Thailand) Kritsananon Srisuwan	2017–present	233
2	(Thailand) Pathomchai Sueasakul	2016–2023	222
3	(Thailand) Ukrit Wongmeema	2012–2022, 2025–present	218
4	(Thailand) Kampol Pathomakkakul	2021–present	204
5	(Thailand) Ekkaluck Thonghkit	2013–2021	203
6	(Thailand) Chutipol Thongthae	2013–2019	181
7	(Thailand) Sila Srikampang	2010–2019	175
8	(Thailand) Kiatisak Jiamudom	2020–present	169
9	(Thailand) Pawee Tanthatemee	2016–2023	134
10	(Ivory Coast) Henri Jöel	2011–2015	132

Top 10 all-time scorers
Rank	Player	Club appearances	Total goals
1	(Brazil) Heberty	90	65
2	(Madagascar) Njiva Rakotoharimalala	81	47
3	(Spain) Tana	76	25
4	(Brazil) Derley	67	24
4	(Thailand) Philip Roller	122	23
6	(Ivory Coast) Yannick Boli	72	23
7	(Martinique) Steeven Langil	101	22
8	(Cameroon) Marcel Essombé	35	20
8	(South Korea) Kang Soo-il	43	20
10	(Portugal) Yannick Djaló	43	19
10	(Brazil) Douglas Cordozo	68	19

- Biggest wins: 8–1 vs Customs Ladkrabang United (27 October 2021)
- Heaviest defeats: 0–6 vs Buriram United (8 December 2024)
- Youngest goal scorers: Phongsakon Sangkasopha ~ 18 years 1 month 1 day old (On 20 November 2024 vs Bankhai United)
- Oldest goal scorers: (Brazil) Douglas Cardozo ~ 40 years 7 months 17 days old (On 2 November 2022 vs Warin Chamrap)
- Youngest ever debutant: Pichaya Chaiwarangkun ~ 16 years 7 months 28 days old (On 7 April 2019 vs Chiangrai United)
- Oldest ever player: (Brazil) Douglas Cardozo ~ 41 years 7 months 11 days old (On 7 May 2023 vs Buriram United)

== Notable players ==
As of 2026–27 season.

=== International capped players ===
AFC/OFC.: (Brunei) Faiq Bolkiah; (Iran) Vafa Hakhamaneshi; (Japan) Sai van Wermeskerken; (Jordan) Rajaei Ayed; (Malaysia) Daniel Ting; (Malaysia) Safawi Rasid; (Myanmar) Hein Phyo Win; (Myanmar) Myo Min Latt; (Myanmar) Thein Than Win; (Philippines) Adam Reed; (Philippines) Amin Nazari; (Philippines) Bernd Schipmann; (Philippines) Curt Dizon; (Philippines) Daisuke Sato; (Philippines) Javier Patiño; (Philippines) Jesse Curran; (Philippines) Luke Woodland; (Philippines) Manny Ott; (Philippines) Mark Hartmann; (Philippines) OJ Porteria; (Singapore) Ikhsan Fandi; (South Korea) Cho Jin-soo; (South Korea) Lee Jae-sung	CAF.: (Algeria) Mehdi Terki; (Cape Verde) Alvin Fortes; (Democratic Republic of the Congo) Joël Sami; (Ghana) Samed Okocha Awudu; (Guinea) Mohamed Mara; (Guinea-Bissau) Romário Baldé; (Guinea-Bissau) Yasser Baldé; (Ivory Coast) Giovanni Sio; (Ivory Coast) Yannick Boli; (Madagascar) Njiva Rakotoharimalala; (Madagascar) Ibrahim Amada; (Morocco) Alharbi El Jadeyaoui; (Togo) Serge Nyuiadzi	UEFA.: (Austria) Robert Žulj; (Belgium) Marvin Ogunjimi; (France) Romain Habran; (Republic of Ireland) Andy Keogh; (Lithuania) Nerijus Valskis; (Montenegro) Andrija Delibašić; (Portugal) Yannick Djaló; (Scotland) Scott Allardice; (Spain) Jonathan Viera; (Spain) Pablo Insua; (Switzerland) Sébastien Wüthrich	CONMEBOL/ CONCACAF.: (Brazil) Bruno Mendes; (Brazil) Negueba; (Costa Rica) José Luis Cordero; (Guadeloupe) Larry Clavier; (Martinique) Jérémy Corinus; (Martinique) Steeven Langil; (Paraguay) Javier Acuña

== Managerial history ==
Name	Period	Honours
(Thailand) Somchai Maiwilai	January 2009–January 2010	
(Thailand) Prapol Pongpanich	January 2010–2 August 2010	
(Thailand) Somchai Maiwilai (2)	3 August 2010–June 2013	2011 Regional League Central-East Division 2011 Thai League 3 2012 Thai League 2
(Spain) Iván Palanco	June 2013–24 December 2013	
(Spain) Ricardo Rodríguez	19 January 2014 – 1 November 2014	
(Spain) Àlex Gómez	1 November 2014 – 30 January 2015	
(Spain) Josep Ferré	31 January 2015 – 14 December 2015	
(Spain) Pacheta	5 January 2016 – 13 November 2017	2016 Thai FA Cup
(Germany) Christian Ziege	13 November 2017 – 22 February 2018	
(Belgium) René Desaeyere	22 February 2018 – 15 March 2018	
(Tunisia) Lassaad Chabbi	15 March 2018 – 7 November 2018	
(Spain) Manolo Márquez	7 November 2018 – 22 January 2019	
(Spain) Francesc Bosch	22 January 2019 – 22 March 2019	
(Italy) Marco Simone	25 March 2019 – 14 July 2019	
(Thailand) Somchai Maiwilai (caretaker) (3)	14 July 2019 – 20 October 2019	
(Thailand) Nuengrutai Srathongvian	20 October 2019 – 10 November 2019	
(Thailand) Chaitud Uamtham	10 November 2019 – 15 November 2020	
(Serbia) Miloš Joksić	19 November 2020 – 25 December 2020	
(Thailand) Somchai Maiwilai (4)	25 December 2020 – 26 January 2022	
(Portugal) Bruno Pereira	26 January 2022 – 4 July 2022	
(Spain) Xavi Moro	4 July 2022 – 11 May 2023	
(Brazil) Douglas Cardozo	11 May 2023 – 23 June 2023	
(Spain) Carlos Peña	24 June 2023 – 26 May 2024	
(Thailand) Surapong Kongthep	28 June 2024 – 16 September 2024	
(Thailand) Somchai Maiwilai (interim) (5)	17 September 2024 – 20 November 2024	
(Thailand) Worrawoot Srimaka	20 November 2024–present	

== Season-by-season record ==
Season	League									FA Cup	League Cup	ACL	ACL2	Top scorer	
Season	Division	P	W	D	L	F	A	Pts	Pos	FA Cup	League Cup	ACL	ACL2	Name	Goals
2007	DIV 1	22	5	4	13	31	40	19	12th			–	–		
2008	DIV 2	20	7	9	4	32	26	30	7th			–	–		
2009	DIV 2 Central-East	22	4	9	9	31	33	21	9th			–	–		
2010	DIV 2 Central-East	30	12	9	9	45	39	45	9th			–	–		
2011	DIV 2 Central-East	30	20	8	2	67	19	68	1st	R2	R1	–	–	(Thailand) Pornchai Ardjinda	18+(5)
2012	DIV 1	34	24	6	4	85	31	78	1st	R4	RU	–	–	(Brazil) Douglas Cardozo	19
2013	TPL	32	6	12	14	31	39	30	15th	R3	RU	–	–	(Brazil) Douglas Cardozo	10
2014	TPL	38	17	14	7	62	42	65	4th	R4	SF	–	–	(Brazil) Heberty	26
2015	TPL	34	17	4	13	48	50	55	7th	QF	R3	–	–	(Brazil) Heberty	19
2016	T1	30	14	7	9	52	35	49	6th	W	R1	–	–	(Brazil) Heberty	20
2017	T1	34	16	7	11	63	49	55	6th	R1	SF	–	–	(Cameroon) Marcel Essombé	20
2018	T1	34	12	7	15	50	53	43	12th	SF	R1	–	–	(South Korea) Kang Soo-il	13
2019	T1	30	10	8	12	48	48	38	8th	RU	R1	–	–	(Ivory Coast) Yannick Boli	14
2020–21	T1	30	13	7	10	48	41	46	8th	QF	–	–	–	(Thailand) Philip Roller	14
2021–22	T1	30	9	9	12	32	36	36	12th	R2	R3	GS	–	(Brazil) Derley	13
2022–23	T1	30	10	11	9	32	29	41	8th	R3	SF	–	–	(Brazil) Derley	8
2023–24	T1	30	11	6	13	39	35	39	6th	R2	QF	–	–	(Madagascar) Njiva Rakotoharimalala	9
2024–25	T1	30	15	7	8	65	47	52	4th	SF	SF	–	–	(France) Clément Depres	18
2025–26	T1	30	18	5	7	55	30	59	3rd	QF	R1	–	QF	(Brazil) Denílson (Madagascar) Njiva Rakotoharimalala	15

Champions	Runners-up	Third place	Promoted	Relegated	In Progress

== Continental record ==
Season	Competition	Round	Club	Home	Away	Aggregate
2021	AFC Champions League	Group G	(South Korea) Pohang Steelers	0–0	0–2	4th out of 4
2021	AFC Champions League	Group G	(Malaysia) Johor Darul Ta'zim	0–1	0–0	4th out of 4
2021	AFC Champions League	Group G	(Japan) Nagoya Grampus	0–4	0–3	4th out of 4
2025–26	AFC Champions League Two	Group F	(Japan) Gamba Osaka	0–2	0–2	2nd out of 4
2025–26	AFC Champions League Two	Group F	(Vietnam) Nam Định	2–0	1–3	2nd out of 4
2025–26	AFC Champions League Two	Group F	(Hong Kong) Eastern	5–1	7–0	2nd out of 4
2025–26	AFC Champions League Two	Round of 16	(Indonesia) Persib Bandung	3–0	0–1	3–1
2025–26	AFC Champions League Two	Quarter-final	(Japan) Gamba Osaka	1–2 (a.e.t.)	1–1	2–3 (a.e.t.)
2026–27	AFC Champions League Elite	League stage	(China) Shanghai Port	4–6	—N/a	
2026–27	AFC Champions League Elite	League stage	(Japan) Kyoto Sanga	—N/a	0–1	
2026–27	AFC Champions League Elite	League stage	(Japan) Kashiwa Reysol	0–0	—N/a	
2026–27	AFC Champions League Elite	League stage	(Japan) Vissel Kobe	—N/a	2–3	
2026–27	AFC Champions League Elite	League stage	(Malaysia) Johor Darul Ta'zim		—N/a	
2026–27	AFC Champions League Elite	League stage	(China) Beijing Guoan	—N/a		
2026–27	AFC Champions League Elite	League stage	(Japan) Gamba Osaka		—N/a	
2026–27	AFC Champions League Elite	League stage	(Japan) Kashima Antlers	—N/a		
2026–27	ASEAN Club Championship	Group A	(Vietnam) Công An Hồ Chí Minh City	1–1	—N/a	
2026–27	ASEAN Club Championship	Group A	(Singapore) Tampines Rovers	—N/a	2–3	
2026–27	ASEAN Club Championship	Group A	(Philippines) Manila Digger		—N/a	
2026–27	ASEAN Club Championship	Group A	(Indonesia) Borneo Samarinda	—N/a		
2026–27	ASEAN Club Championship	Group A	(Thailand) Buriram United	—N/a		
2026–27	ASEAN Club Championship	Group A	(Malaysia) Kuching City		—N/a	
