= 2020–21 BG Pathum United F.C. season =

Association football team in Thai League 2

BG Pathum United F.C.
2020–21 season
- Chairman: Pavin Bhirombhakdi
- Manager: Dusit Chalermsan
- Stadium: Leo Stadium, Thanyaburi, Pathum Thani, Thailand
- Thai League 1: 1st (champions)
- Thai FA Cup: Second round
- Thai League Cup: Cancelled
- Top goalscorer: League: Victor (15 goals); All: Victor (15 goals)

The 2020–21 season was BG Pathum United F.C.'s first season back in the Thai League 1 after being promoted from the 2019 Thai League 2 as winners.

Coach Dusit continued to coach the team after extending his contract.

On March 1, all of Thai League 1 matches between 7 and 31 march will be played behind closed doors as broadcast only events. However, on March 4, the decision changed to postpone all of matches prior to 18 April due to the coronavirus pandemic in Thailand.

It was later confirmed that the match will restarted in September 2020 and end in May 2021.

== Squad ==
As of 25 June 2019.

Squad No.	Name	Nationality	Date of birth (age)	Previous club
Goalkeepers
1	Chatchai Budprom	(Thailand)	4 February 1987 (age 39)	(Thailand) Chiangrai United
21	Rattanachat Neamtaisong	(Thailand)	21 May 2001 (age 25)	Youth Team
25	Fahas Bilanglod	(Thailand)	3 March 1999 (age 27)	Youth Team
Defenders
5	Victor Cardozo	(Brazil)	19 December 1989 (age 36)	(Thailand) PTT Rayong
11	Saharat Pongsuwan	(Thailand)	11 June 1996 (age 30)	(Thailand) Chiangmai
17	Irfan Fandi	(Singapore)	13 August 1997 (age 29)	(Singapore) Garena Young Lions
22	Santipharp Chan-ngom	(Thailand)	23 September 1996 (age 30)	(Thailand) Police Tero
23	Peerapong Pichitchotirat	(Thailand)	28 June 1984 (age 42)	(Thailand) Chiangrai
30	Andrés Túñez	(Venezuela) (Syria)	15 March 1987 (age 39)	(Thailand) Buriram United
77	Álvaro Silva	(Philippines) (Spain)	30 March 1984 (age 42)	(Thailand) Suphanburi
Midfielders
2	Saharat Posri	(Thailand)	11 April 1994 (age 32)	(Thailand) Khon Kaen
3	Tossaphol Chomchon	(Thailand)	12 December 1989 (age 36)	(Thailand) Chiangmai
4	Chaowat Veerachat	(Thailand)	23 June 1996 (age 30)	(Japan) Cerezo Osaka U-23
6	Sarach Yooyen	(Thailand)	30 May 1992 (age 34)	(Thailand) Muangthong United
8	Thitipan Puangchan	(Thailand)	1 September 1993 (age 33)	(Japan) Oita Trinita
10	Sumanya Purisai	(Thailand)	5 December 1986 (age 39)	(Thailand) Port
16	Thanakrit Laorkai	(Thailand)	22 December 2003 (age 22)	Youth Team
18	Pathompol Charoenrattanapirom	(Thailand)	21 April 1994 (age 32)	(Thailand) Police Tero
24	Sarawin Saengra	(Thailand)	9 September 1997 (age 29)	(Thailand) Khon Kaen
26	Supasak Sarapee	(Thailand)	5 April 2000 (age 26)	Youth Team
66	Mitsuru Maruoka	(Japan)	6 January 1996 (age 30)	(Japan) Cerezo Osaka
Strikers
7	Diogo	(Brazil)	26 May 1987 (age 39)	(Malaysia) Johor Darul Ta'zim
9	Surachat Sareepim	(Thailand) (Laos)	24 October 1986 (age 40)	(Thailand) Police United
13	Tawan Khotrsupho	(Thailand)	23 January 2000 (age 26)	(Japan) Cerezo Osaka U-23
19	Chenrop Samphaodi	(Thailand)	2 June 1995 (age 31)	(Thailand) Port F.C.
27	Nattawut Namthip	(Thailand)	3 January 1997 (age 29)	(Thailand) Chiangmai
28	Teerasil Dangda	(Thailand)	6 June 1988 (age 38)	(Japan) Shimizu S-Pulse
29	Chatree Chimtalay	(Thailand)	14 December 1983 (age 42)	(Thailand) Bangkok F.C.
35	Siroch Chatthong	(Thailand)	8 December 1992 (age 33)	(Thailand) PT Prachuap
79	Thanadon Supaphon	(Thailand)	16 December 2000 (age 25)	Youth Team
80	Thammayut Rakbun	(Thailand)	7 March 1997 (age 29)	Youth Team
Players loaned out / left during season
99	Norshahrul Idlan	(Malaysia)	8 June 1985 (age 41)	(Malaysia) Pahang FA
20	Toti	(Spain)	21 September 1987 (age 39)	(Spain) Deportivo Alavés
39	Piyachanok Darit	(Thailand)	5 November 1992 (age 34)	(Thailand) Rajpracha
92	Thammayut Tonkham	(Thailand)	24 March 1997 (age 29)	(Thailand) Khon Kaen
37	Barros Tardeli	(Brazil)	2 March 1990 (age 36)	(Thailand) Trat
32	Yuki Bamba	(Japan)	2 May 1986 (age 40)	(Thailand) Trat
	Athibordee Atirat	(Thailand)	28 February 1992 (age 34)	(Thailand) Port F.C.
	Pinyo Inpinit	(Thailand)	1 July 1993 (age 33)	(Thailand) Port F.C.
7	Chakkit Laptrakul	(Thailand)	2 December 1994 (age 31)	(Japan) Tokushima Vortis
43	Chaiyapruek Chirachin	(Thailand)	29 July 2000 (age 26)	Youth Team
34	Somyot Pongsuwan	(Thailand)	10 September 1993 (age 33)	(Thailand) Sisaket
36	Suwannapat Kingkaew	(Thailand)	10 June 1994 (age 32)	(Thailand) Chiangmai
38	Korraphat Nareechan	(Thailand)	7 October 1997 (age 29)	(Thailand) Khonkaen
	Narit Taweekul	(Thailand)	30 October 1983 (age 43)	(Thailand) Chiangmai
3	Chalermsak Aukkee	(Thailand)	25 August 1994 (age 32)	(Thailand) Ubon United
28	Apisit Sorada	(Thailand)	28 February 1997 (age 29)	(Thailand) Chiangmai
71	Eakkalak Lungnam	(Thailand)	17 October 1985 (age 41)	(Thailand) PT Prachuap
72	Ronnayod Mingmitwan	(Thailand)	14 September 1998 (age 28)	(Thailand) Khonkaen
91	Tanin Kiatlerttham	(Thailand)	23 August 2000 (age 26)	Youth Team
22	Nattachai Srisuwan	(Thailand)	3 February 1995 (age 31)	(Thailand) Samutsongkhram
24	Siwakorn Sangwong	(Thailand)	6 February 1997 (age 29)	Youth Team
	Atthawit Sukchuai	(Thailand)	13 March 1996 (age 30)	(Thailand) Chiangmai
36	Samroeng Hanchiaw	(Thailand)	5 February 1995 (age 31)	Youth Team
97	Phongrawit Jantawong	(Thailand)	7 October 2000 (age 26)	(Japan) Cerezo Osaka U-23
	Nantawat Suankaew	(Thailand)	8 December 1998 (age 27)	(Thailand) PTT Rayong

== Transfer ==
=== Pre-season transfer ===
==== In ====
Position	Player	Transferred From	Ref
DF	(Philippines) (Spain) Álvaro Silva	(Thailand) Suphanburi F.C.	
DF	(Thailand) Suwannapat Kingkaew	(Thailand) Chiangmai F.C.	
DF	(Thailand) Santipharp Channgom	(Thailand) Police Tero F.C.	
DF	(Brazil) Victor Cardozo	(Thailand) PTT Rayong F.C.	
MF	(Thailand) Peerapong Pichitchotirat	(Thailand) Chiangrai United	
MF	(Thailand) Somyos Pongsuwan	(Thailand) Sisaket F.C.	
MF	(Thailand) Sumanya Purisai	(Thailand) Port F.C.	
MF	(Thailand) (Ghana) Jakkapong Pholmat	(Thailand) Army United F.C.	
MF	(Japan) Yuki Bamba	(Thailand) Trat F.C.	
FW	(Thailand) Siroch Chatthong	(Thailand) PT Prachuap F.C.	
FW	(Thailand) Nattawut Namthip	(Thailand) BTU United F.C.	
FW	(Malaysia) Norshahrul Idlan	(Malaysia) Pahang FA	Free

==== Out ====
Position	Player	Transferred To	Ref
GK	(Thailand) Boonyakait Wongsajaem	(Thailand) Navy Football Club	Free
GK	(Thailand) Chalermkeat Pootoya		Free
DF	(Thailand) Pichit Ketsro	(Thailand) Samut Sakhon F.C.	
MF	(Japan) Seiya Kojima	(Thailand) Kasetsart F.C.	
MF	(Thailand) Phommin Kaeosanga	(Thailand) Khonkaen F.C.	
MF	(Thailand) Chanutr Phisitsak	(Thailand) BTU United F.C.	
MF	(Thailand) Tassanapong Muaddarak	(Thailand) Chiangmai F.C.	Undisclosed
FW	(Brazil) Jonatan Reis	(Thailand) Suphanburi F.C.	Loan Return
FW	(Thailand) Sarawut Masuk	(Thailand) Nongbua Pitchaya F.C.	
FW	(Costa Rica) Ariel Francisco Rodríguez	(Costa Rica) Deportivo Saprissa	Free

==== Loan Out ====
Position	Player	Transferred To	Ref
GK	(Thailand) Narit Taweekul	(Thailand) Khon Kaen F.C.	Season loan
GK	(Thailand) Korraphat Nareechan	(Thailand) Chiangmai F.C.	Season loan
GK	(Thailand) Rattanachart Niamthaisong	(Thailand) Chiangmai F.C.	Season loan
DF	(Thailand) Apisit Sorada	(Thailand) Chiangmai F.C.	Season loan
DF	(Thailand) Chalermsak Aukkee	(Thailand) Chiangmai F.C.	Season loan
DF	(Thailand) Piyachanok Darit	(Thailand) Khon Kaen F.C.	Season Loan
DF	(Thailand) Tanin Kiatlerttham	(Thailand) Chiangmai F.C.	Season loan
DF	(Thailand) Eakkalak Lungnam	(Thailand) Chiangmai F.C.	Season loan
DF	(Thailand) Ronnayod Mingmitwan	(Thailand) Khon Kaen F.C.	Season loan
MF	(Thailand) Siwakorn Sangwong	(Thailand) Chiangmai F.C.	Season loan
MF	(Thailand) Nattachai Srisuwan	(Thailand) Chiangmai F.C.	Season loan
MF	(Thailand) Pongrawit Jantawong	(Japan) Cerezo Osaka U-23	Season loan
MF	(Thailand) Atthawit Sukchuai	(Thailand) Chiangmai F.C.	Season loan
FW	(Thailand) Samroeng Hanchiaw	(Thailand) Chiangmai F.C.	Season loan
FW	(Thailand) Nattawut Namthip	(Thailand) Chiangmai F.C.	Season loan
FW	(Thailand) Tawan Khotrsupho	(Japan) Cerezo Osaka U-23	Season loan
FW	(Thailand) Nantawat Suankaew	(Thailand) PTT Rayong F.C.	Season loan

==== Return from loan ====
Position	Player	Transferred From	Ref
GK	(Thailand) Narit Taweekul	(Thailand) Chiangmai F.C.	Loan Return
GK	(Thailand) Korraphat Nareechan	(Thailand) Khon Kaen F.C.	Loan Return
GK	(Thailand) Boonyakait Wongsajaem	(Thailand) Ayutthaya United F.C.	Loan Return
DF	(Thailand) Piyachanok Darit	(Thailand) Port F.C.	Loan Return
DF	(Thailand) Ronnayod Mingmitwan	(Thailand) Khonkaen F.C.	Loan Return
DF	(Thailand) Apisit Sorada	(Thailand) Chiangmai F.C.	Loan Return
MF	(Thailand) Atthawit Sukchuai	(Thailand) Chiangrai United	Loan Return
MF	(Thailand) Thitipan Puangchan	(Japan) Oita Trinita	Loan Return
MF	(Thailand) Phongrawit Jantawong	(Japan) Cerezo Osaka U-23	Loan Return
MF	(Thailand) Phommin Kaeosanga	(Thailand) Khonkaen F.C.	Loan Return
MF	(Japan) Yuki Bamba	(Thailand) Trat F.C.	Loan Return
FW	(Thailand) Tawan Khotrsupho	(Japan) Cerezo Osaka U-23	Loan Return
FW	(Thailand) Sarawut Masuk	(Thailand) PTT Rayong F.C.	Loan Return
FW	(Costa Rica) Ariel Francisco Rodríguez	(Thailand) PTT Rayong F.C.	Loan Return

==== Extension / Retained ====
Position	Player	Ref
GK	(Thailand) Fahas Bilanglod	
DF	(Singapore) Irfan Fandi	
MF	(Spain) Toti	
FW	(Thailand) Chatree Chimtalay	
FW	(Thailand) Surachat Sareepim	
FW	(Brazil) Barros Tardeli	

=== Mid-season transfer ===
==== In ====
Position	Player	Transferred From	Ref
DF	(Venezuela) (Syria) Andrés Túñez	(Thailand) Buriram United	Free
DF	(Thailand) Thammayut Tonkham	(Thailand) Khon Kaen F.C.	Undisclosed
MF	(Thailand) Sarach Yooyen	(Thailand) Muangthong United	THB30m
MF	(Thailand) Sarawin Saengra	(Thailand) Khon Kaen F.C.	Undisclosed
FW	(Thailand) Chenrop Samphaodi	(Thailand) Port F.C.	Undisclosed
FW	(Thailand) Pinyo Inpinit	(Thailand) Port F.C.	Free
DF	(Thailand) Athibordee Atirat	(Thailand) Port F.C.	Free
MF	(Japan) Mitsuru Maruoka	(Japan) Cerezo Osaka	Free
FW	(Thailand) Teerasil Dangda	(Japan) Shimizu S-Pulse	THB24m
FW	(Brazil) Diogo Luís Santo	(Malaysia) Johor Darul Ta'zim F.C.	Free
MF	(Thailand) Pathompol Charoenrattanapirom	(Thailand) Chiangrai F.C.	Undisclosed

==== Out ====
Position	Player	Transferred To	Ref
DF	(Thailand) Chalermsak Aukkee	(Thailand) Police Tero F.C.	Undisclosed
MF	(Thailand) (Ghana) Jakkapong Pholmat		Released
MF	(Thailand) Somyot Pongsuwan	(Thailand) Chiangmai F.C.	Free
MF	(Thailand) Chakkit Laptrakul	(Thailand) Samut Prakan City F.C.	Free
FW	(Malaysia) Norshahrul Idlan	(Malaysia) Sarawak United	Free
FW	(Thailand) Pinyo Inpinit	(Thailand) Chiangmai F.C.	Undisclosed
FW	(Thailand) Nantawat Suankaew	(Thailand) Port F.C.	Undisclosed

==== Loan Out ====
Position	Player	Transferred To	Ref
DF	(Thailand) Chaiyapruek Chirachin	(Thailand) Rajpracha F.C.	Season loan
DF	(Thailand) Piyachanok Darit	(Thailand) Rajpracha F.C.	Season loan
DF	(Thailand) Suwannapat Kingkaew	(Thailand) Rajpracha F.C.	Season loan
DF	(Thailand) Tanin Kiatlerttham	(Thailand) Rajpracha F.C.	Season loan
DF	(Thailand) Athibordee Atirat	(Thailand) Chiangmai F.C.	Season loan
DF	(Thailand) Pardsakorn Sripudpong	(Thailand) Kasetsart F.C.	Season loan
DF	(Thailand) Thammayut Tonkham	(Thailand) Rajpracha F.C.	Season loan
DF	(Thailand) Piyachanok Darit	(Thailand) Suphanburi F.C.	Season loan
MF	(Spain) Toti	(Thailand) Samut Prakan City F.C.	Season loan
MF	(Japan) Yuki Bamba	(Thailand) Chiangmai F.C.	Season loan
FW	(Brazil) Barros Tardeli	(Thailand) Samut Prakan City F.C.	Season loan
FW	(Thailand) Nattawut Namthip	(Thailand) Rajpracha F.C.	Loan Return
FW	(Thailand) Pinyo Inpinit	(Thailand) Chiangmai F.C.	Season loan
FW	(Thailand) Pongrawit Jantawong	(Thailand) Sisaket F.C.	Season loan

==== Return from loan ====
Position	Player	Transferred From	Ref
DF	(Thailand) Piyachanok Darit	(Thailand) Khon Kaen F.C.	Loan Return
DF	(Thailand) Tanin Kiatlerttham	(Thailand) Chiangmai F.C.	Loan Return
DF	(Thailand) Piyachanok Darit	(Thailand) Rajpracha F.C.	Loan Return
DF	(Thailand) Chalermsak Aukkee	(Thailand) Chiangmai F.C.	Loan Return
FW	(Thailand) Nattawut Namthip	(Thailand) Chiangmai F.C.	Loan Return
FW	(Thailand) Tawan Khotrsupho	(Japan) Cerezo Osaka U-23	Loan Return
FW	(Thailand) Pinyo Inpinit	(Thailand) Rajpracha F.C.	Loan Return

==== Extension ====
Position	Player	Ref
DF	(Brazil) Victor Cardozo	
DF	(Singapore) Irfan Fandi	Signed 3 years contract, ending 2024
MF	(Thailand) Chaowat Veerachat	

== Friendlies ==
=== Pre-Season Friendly ===
Win Draw Loss

8 January 2020 1	BG Pathum United (Thailand)	0–1	(Thailand) North Bangkok University

15 January 2020 2	BG Pathum United (Thailand)	4–3	(Cambodia) Visakha	Leo Stadium
	Yuki Bumba 15'; Siroch Chatthong 19'; Thanadon Supaphon 29'; Chakkit Laptrakul 90'		59'; Tith Dina 85'; Sary Matnorotin 87'

18 January 2020 3	BG Pathum United (Thailand)	1–2	(South Korea) Incheon United	King Mongkut's Institute of Technology Ladkrabang Stadium
	Toti 45' (pen.)		Kim Chae-woon 19'; Choi Beom-Kyung 54'

30 January 2020 4	BG Pathum United (Thailand)	3–1	(Thailand) Samut Sakhon	Leo Stadium
	Yuki Bumba 15'; Siroch Chatthong 60'; 64' (o.g.)		Goal

5 February 2020 5	BG Pathum United (Thailand)	4–0	(Thailand) Rajpracha	Leo Stadium
	Chatree Chimtalay 62' 75'; Chakkit Laptrakul 28'; Santipharp Channgom 31'

8 February 2020 6	BG Pathum United (Thailand)	2–0	(Thailand) Ratchaburi Mitr Phol	Leo Stadium
	Victor Cardozo

Leo Cup 2020 Thailand – 23 to 30 January

23 January 2020 1	BG Pathum United (Thailand)	0–1	(Thailand) PT Prachuap	Leo Stadium
		Report	Bruno Mezenga 25'	Referee: Songkran Boonmeekiat

=== Mid-Season Friendly ===
Win Draw Loss

31 July 2020 1	BG Pathum United (Thailand)	1–1	(Thailand) Port	Pathum Thani province
	Toti 61'	Report	Heberty 2'	Stadium: Leo Stadium; Referee: Noppaphade Muangngam

6 August 2020 2	BG Pathum United (Thailand)	0–1	(Thailand) Nongbua Pitchaya	Khon Kaen province
			Tiago Chulapa

21 August 2020 3	BG Pathum United (Thailand)	2–0	(Thailand) Police Tero	Pathum Thani province
	Chenrop Samphaodi 43'; Surachat Sareepim 68'	Report		Stadium: Leo Stadium

3 September 2020 4	BG Pathum United (Thailand)	2–2	(Thailand) Chonburi	Nonthaburi province
	Sumanya Purisai 40'; Thitiphan Puangjan 45'	Report	Phanuphong Phonsa 26'; Dragan Bošković 42'	Stadium: SCG Stadium

== Competitions ==
=== Thai League 1 ===
Win Draw Loss

15 February 2020 1	BG Pathum United	2–1	SCG Muangthong United	Pathum Thani province
19:00 UTC+7	Victor Cardozo 58' (pen.); Thitiphan Puangjan 69'; Suwannapat Kingkaew (yellow card) 37'; Irfan Fandi (red card) 44'	Report	Derley 38' (pen.); Sarach Yooyen (yellow card) 26' (yellow-red card) 64'; Wattanakorn Sawatlakhorn (yellow card) 34'	Stadium: Leo Stadium; Attendance: 9.828; Referee: Niwat Insaard

22 February 2020 2	PT Prachuap	0–0	BG Pathum United	Prachuap Khiri Khan province
20:00 UTC+7		Report	Santipharp Channgom (yellow card) 54'; Victor Cardozo (yellow card) 85'	Stadium: Prachuap Khiri Khan Province Stadium; Attendance: 3,644; Referee: Songkran Bunmeekiart

26 February 2020 3	BG Pathum United	3–0	Police Tero	Pathum Thani province
19:00 UTC+7	Irfan Fandi 6'; Toti 27'; Siroch Chatthong 42'; Thitipan Puangchan (yellow card) 90'	Report	Thitawee Auksornsri (yellow card) 6'; Isaac Honny (yellow card) 55'	Stadium: Leo Stadium; Attendance: 7,345; Referee: Torphong Somsing

1 March 2020 4	Trat	0–1	BG Pathum United	Trat
18:00 UTC+7	Chalermsuk Kaewsuktae (yellow card) 83' (yellow-red card) 84'; Sathaporn Daengsee (yellow card) 90'	Report	Thitipan Puangchan 69'; Sumanya Purisai (yellow card) 90'; Saharat Pongsuwan (yellow card) 90'	Stadium: Trat Province Stadium; Attendance: 2,555; Referee: Kotchapoom Meesridaecha

10 October 2020 (Note: The Thai League matches originally scheduled in March are postponed following the coronavirus pandemic.) 5	BG Pathum United	1–0	Buriram United	Pathum Thani province
19:00 UTC+7	Andrés Túñez 58' (yellow card) 89'; Saharat Pongsuwan (yellow card) 26'; Chenrop Samphaodi (yellow card) 50'		Supachai Jaided (yellow card) 27'; Jakkaphan Kaewprom (yellow card) 90+1'	Stadium: Leo Stadium; Attendance: 2,414; Referee: Niwat Insa-ard

19 September 2020 6	Port	0–1	BG Pathum United	Bangkok
19:00 UTC+7	Sergio Suárez (yellow card) 19'; Elias Dolah (yellow card) 44'; Kanarin Thawornsak (yellow card) 82'		Chenrop Samphaodi 13'; Mitsuru Maruoka (yellow card) 34'; Thitipan Puangchan (yellow card) 45+1'; Andrés Túñez (yellow card) 49'; Santipharp Chan-ngom (yellow card) 53'	Stadium: PAT Stadium; Attendance: 1,357; Referee: Songkran Bunmeekiart

27 September 2020 7	True Bangkok United	0–2	BG Pathum United	Pathum Thani province
18:00 UTC+7	Peerapat Notchaiya (yellow card) 83'; Sanrawat Dechmitr (yellow card) 90'		Victor Cardozo 57'; Manuel Bihr 63' (o.g.); Irfan Fandi (yellow card) 41'; Sarawin Saengra (yellow card) 84'	Stadium: Thammasat Stadium; Attendance: 3,850; Referee: Wiwat Jumpaoon

3 October 2020 8	BG Pathum United	2–1	Rayong	Pathum Thani province
17:45 UTC+7	Victor Cardozo 31' (pen.) 89' (pen.) (yellow card) 90+1'; Thitipan Puangchan (yellow card) 35'; Peerapong Pichitchotirat (yellow card) 49'		Danilo 10'; Watcharin Nuengprakaew (yellow card) 30'; Suwat Junboonpha (yellow card) 51'; Kirati Kaewnongdang (yellow card) 90+3'	Stadium: Leo Stadium; Attendance: 1,940; Referee: Paisan Bendemalee

17 October 2020 9	BG Pathum United	2–2	Samut Prakan City	Pathum Thani province
19:00 UTC+7	Toti 25'; Victor Cardozo 70' (pen.); Thitipan Puangchan (yellow card) 79'		Chakkit Laptrakul 3'; Chayawat Srinawong 78'; Jakkapan Praisuwan (yellow card) 23' (yellow-red card) 56'; Aris Zarifović (yellow card) 68'; Patiwat Khammai (yellow card) 90+3'	Stadium: Leo Stadium; Attendance: 2,489; Referee: Torphong Somsing

25 October 2020 10	Sukhothai	2–3	BG Pathum United	Sukhothai
18:00 UTC+7	Satsanapong Wattayuchutikul 11' (o.g.); Ibson Melo 32'; John Baggio 87'; Ekkasit Chaobut (yellow card) 45'; Decha Sa-ardchom (yellow card) 50'		Sumanya Purisai 1'; Siroch Chatthong 57'; Chatree Chimtalay (yellow card) 90+4'	Stadium: Thalay Luang Stadium; Attendance: 2,005; Referee: Sivakorn Pu-udom

31 October 2020 11	Singha Chiangrai United	0–1	BG Pathum United	Chiangrai
17:00 UTC+7	Shinnaphat Leeaoh (yellow card) 79'		Andrés Túñez 76' (yellow card) 65'; Santipharp Chan-ngom (yellow card) 52'; Thitipan Puangchan (yellow card) 60'; Sumanya Purisai (yellow card) 62'	Stadium: Singha Stadium; Attendance: 5,470; Referee: Natee Choosuwan

21 November 2020 12	BG Pathum United	2–1	Chonburi	Pathum Thani province
18:00 UTC+7	Chenrop Samphaodi 14'; Sumanya Purisai 45+1'; Victor Cardozo (yellow card) 27'; Thitipan Puangchan (yellow card) 65'		Dragan Bošković 77'; Noppanon Kachaplayuk (yellow card) 45+1'; Caion (red card) 87'	Stadium: Leo Stadium; Attendance: 4,962; Referee: Sarayut Jakngoen

27 November 2020 13	Nakhon Ratchasima Mazda	0–2	BG Pathum United	Nakhon Ratchasima province
18:30 UTC+7	Leandro Assumpção (penalty missed) 45; Dennis Murillo (yellow card) 23'; Weerawat Jiraphaksiri (yellow card) 45+2'		Victor Cardozo 45+7' (pen.) 68'; Santipharp Chan-ngom (yellow card) 76'	Stadium: 80th Birthday Stadium; Attendance: 4,281; Referee: Anusorn Nookaew

12 December 2020 14	BG Pathum United	4–0	Suphanburi	Pathum Thani province
18:30 UTC+7	Andrés Túñez 2' 90+4'; Supasak Sarapee 26'; Thitiphan Puangjan 79'; Surachat Sareepim (red card) 61'		Jirawat Thongsaengphrao (yellow card) 76'; Patrick Reichelt (yellow card) 90+2'; Parndecha Ngernprasert (yellow card) 90+7'	Stadium: Leo Stadium; Attendance: 4,593; Referee: Chaireag Ngamsom

19 December 2020 15	Ratchaburi Mitr Phol	1–4	BG Pathum United	Ratchaburi province
17:00 UTC+7	Pathomchai Sueasakul 90+1'; Yeo Sung-hae (yellow card) 6'; Ukrit Wongmeema (yellow card) 57'; Pawee Tanthatemee (yellow card) 59'		Andrés Túñez 47' (yellow card) 65'; Victor Cardozo 56' (pen.) 61'; Toti 86'	Stadium: Mitr Phol Stadium; Attendance: 4,373; Referee: Warintorn Sassadee

26 December 2020 16	BG Pathum United	2–0	PT Prachuap	Pathum Thani province
17:00 UTC+7	Sumanya Purisai 40'; Victor Cardozo 69' (pen.) (yellow card) 79'		Wanchalerm Yingyong (yellow card) 51'	Stadium: Leo Stadium; Referee: Songkran Bunmeekiart

6 February 2021 17	Police Tero	0–2	BG Pathum United	Bangkok
18:30 UTC+7	Sitthichok Tassanai (yellow card) 24'; Kwon Dae-hee 87'		Teerasil Dangda 16'; Chatree Chimtalay 82'; Sarach Yooyen 84'	Stadium: Boonyachinda Stadium; Attendance: 0 Referee: Panumas Phansamo

9 February 2021 18	BG Pathum United	2–1	Trat	Pathum Thani province
18:30 UTC+7	Victor Cardozo 34' (pen.); Diogo Luís Santo 45' (yellow card) 38'		Ricado Santos 25'; Todsaporn Sri-reung (yellow card) 33'; Kriangkrai Pimrat (yellow card) 64'	Stadium: Leo Stadium; Attendance: 0 Referee: Paisan Bendemalee

13 February 2021 19	Buriram United	0–1	BG Pathum United	Buriram province
18:00 UTC+7	Piyaphon Phanichakul (yellow card) 45'; Ratthanakorn Maikami (yellow card) 72'; Narubadin Weerawatnodom (yellow card) 89'		Diogo Luís Santo 9'; Santipharp Channgom (yellow card) 26' (yellow-red card) 90+5'; Sarach Yooyen (yellow card) 51'; Surachat Sareepim (yellow card) 87'	Stadium: Chang Arena; Attendance: 0 Referee: Natee Choosuwan

17 February 2021 20	BG Pathum United	2–1	Port	Pathum Thani province
18:30 UTC+7	Victor Cardozo 32'; Chenrop Samphaodi 86'; Sarach Yooyen (yellow card) 74'		Go Seul-ki 30' Nelson Bonilla (yellow card) 40'; Worawut Namvech (yellow card) 71'; Bordin Phala (yellow card) 77'; Martin Steuble (yellow card) 88'	Stadium: Leo Stadium; Referee: Mongkolchai Pechsri

20 February 2021 21	BG Pathum United	1–1	True Bangkok United	Pathum Thani province
17:00 UTC+7	Pathompol Charoenrattanapirom 26'; Andrés Túñez (yellow card) 90+2'; Tossaphol Chomchon (yellow card) 90+3'		Nattawut Suksum 68'; Peerapat Notchaiya (yellow card) 58'	Stadium: Leo Stadium; Referee: Warintorn Sassadee

25 February 2021 22	Rayong	0–1	BG Pathum United	Rayong province
18:30 UTC+7	Suwat Junboonpha (yellow card) 5'; Anuchit Ngrnbukkol (yellow card) 65'; Mehti Sarakham (yellow card) 65'		Pathompol Charoenrattanapirom 28'; Sarawin Saengra (yellow card) 58'; Andrés Túñez (yellow card) 75'	Stadium: Rayong Provincial Stadium; Referee: Vitsavet Sangnakorn

28 February 2021 23	Samut Prakan City	0–6	BG Pathum United	Samut Prakan province
19:00 UTC+7			Victor Cardozo 45+1' 90+3' (pen.); Diogo Luís Santo 51' 55' (pen.) 82'; Santipharp Chan-ngom 74'	Stadium: Samut Prakarn SAT Stadium (Keha Bang Phli); Referee: Wiwat Jumpaoon

4 March 2021 24	BG Pathum United	2–0	Sukhothai	Pathum Thani province
19:00 UTC+7	Sumanya Purisai 6'; Victor Cardozo 70' (pen.); Chenrop Samphaodi (yellow card) 22'		Natthaphon Piamplai (yellow card) 35'; Piyarat Lajungreed (yellow card) 55'; Zaw Min Tun (yellow card) 72'; Leon James (yellow card) 78'; Decha Sa-ardchom (yellow card) 90+4'	Stadium: Leo Stadium; Referee: Chaireag Ngamsom

7 March 2021 25	BG Pathum United	0–0	Singha Chiangrai United	Pathum Thani province
17:00 UTC+7	Andrés Túñez (yellow card) 12'; Diogo Luís Santo (yellow card) 65'		Sivakorn Tiatrakul (yellow card) 19'; Cho Ji-hun (yellow card) 28'; Shinnaphat Leeaoh (yellow card) 75'	Stadium: Leo Stadium; Referee: Warintorn Sassadee

11 March 2021 26	Chonburi	0–1	BG Pathum United	Chonburi province
18:30 UTC+7	Junior Eldstål (yellow card) 53'		Pathompol Charoenrattanapirom 11'; Sarach Yooyen (yellow card) 55'	Stadium: Chonburi Stadium; Referee: Vitsavet Sangnakorn

14 March 2021 27	BG Pathum United	1–0	Nakhon Ratchasima Mazda	Pathum Thani province
19:00 UTC+7	Pathompol Charoenrattanapirom 59'; Saharat Posri (yellow card) 16'			Stadium: Leo Stadium; Referee: Torphong Somsing

17 March 2021 28	Suphanburi	1–1	BG Pathum United	Suphanburi province
18:00 UTC+7	Caion 81'		Diogo Luís Santo 84'	Stadium: Suphan Buri Provincial Stadium; Referee: Teetchai Nualjan

20 March 2021 29	BG Pathum United	2–0	Ratchaburi Mitr Phol	Pathum Thani province
17:30 UTC+7	Pathompol Charoenrattanapirom 37'; Diogo Luís Santo 89'; Sarach Yooyen (yellow card) 85'		Luke Woodlands (yellow card) 80'; Praweenwat Boonyong (yellow card) 90'	Stadium: Leo Stadium; Referee: Natee Choosuwan

28 March 2021 30	SCG Muangthong United	1–0	BG Pathum United	Nonthaburi province
18:00 UTC+7	Willian Popp 42'; Lucas Rocha (yellow card) 25'; Sarawut Kanlayanabandit (yellow card) 49'		Diogo Luís Santo (yellow card) 7'; Thitiphan Puangjan (yellow card) 18'; Pathompol Charoenrattanapirom (yellow card) 54'; Andrés Túñez (yellow card) 62'; Victor Cardozo (yellow card) 62'; Sarach Yooyen (red card) 90+7'	Stadium: SCG Stadium; Referee: Warintorn Sassadee

=== Thai FA Cup ===
Win Draw Loss

7 November 2020 Round 1	Udon Thani	1–2 (a.e.t.)	BG Pathum United	Udon Thani province
18:00 UTC+7	Aleksandar Kapisoda 90'; João Paulo (yellow card) 37'; Tanapat Waempracha (yellow card) 111'; Peerapong Panyanumaporn (yellow card) 113'	Report	Thitipan Puangchan 55'; Chaowat Veerachat 97'; Santipharp Chan-ngom (yellow card) 11'; Andrés Túñez (yellow card) 69'	Stadium: Udon Thani Stadium; Attendance: 2,500; Referee: Chaireag Ngamsom

7 December 2020 Round 2	SCG Muangthong United	2–1 (a.e.t.)	BG Pathum United	Nonthaburi province
18:00 UTC+7	Sardor Mirzaev 5'; Suporn Peenagatapho 103'; Weerathep Pomphan (yellow card) 34'; Patcharapol Intane (yellow card) 110'; Lucas Rocha (yellow card) 112'; Somporn Yos (yellow card) 120+5'		Mitsuru Maruoka 66'; Thitipan Puangchan (yellow card) 19'; Andrés Túñez (yellow card) 101'	Stadium: SCG Stadium; Referee: Songkran Bunmeekiart

== Team statistics ==
=== Appearances and goals ===
As of 27 Sept 2020

No.	Pos.	Player	League 1		FA Cup		League Cup		Total		Discipline	
No.	Pos.	Player	Apps.	Goals	Apps.	Goals	Apps.	Goals	Apps.	Goals	Yellow card	Red card
1	GK	(Thailand) Chatchai Budprom	30	0	1	0	0	0	30	0	0	0
2	MF	(Thailand) Saharat Posri	2(3)	0	0	0	0	0	5	0	0	0
3	MF	(Thailand) Tossaphol Chomchon	8(4)	0	1	0	0	0	13	0	0	0
4	MF	(Thailand) Chaowat Veerachat	9(10)	0	0(1)	1	0	0	20	1	0	0
5	DF	(Brazil) Victor Cardozo	26(1)	15	2	0	0	0	29	15	3	0
6	MF	(Thailand) Sarach Yooyen	24(1)	0	2	0	0	0	27	0	0	0
7	FW	(Brazil) Diogo	9(4)	7	0	0	0	0	13	7	0	0
8	MF	(Thailand) Thitipan Puangchan	20(3)	3	2	1	0	0	25	4	6	0
9	FW	(Thailand) Surachat Sareepim	8(12)	0	1	0	0	0	21	0	0	0
10	MF	(Thailand) Sumanya Purisai	28(1)	3	0(1)	0	0	0	30	3	2	0
11	DF	(Thailand) Saharat Pongsuwan	19(3)	0	2	0	0	0	24	0	1	0
13	FW	(Thailand) Tawan Khotrsupho	1(2)	0	0	0	0	0	3	0	0	0
16	MF	(Thailand) Thanakrit Laorkai	0	0	0	0	0	0	0	0	0	0
17	DF	(Singapore) (South Africa) Irfan Fandi	18(1)	1	0	0	0	0	19	1	1	1
18	MF	(Thailand) Pathompol Charoenrattanapirom	8(7)	6	0	0	0	0	15	6	0	0
19	FW	(Thailand) Chenrop Samphaodi	18(3)	3	1(1)	0	0	0	23	3	1	0
22	DF	(Thailand) Santipharp Chan-ngom	25(3)	1	2	0	0	0	30	1	4	0
23	DF	(Thailand) Peerapong Pichitchotirat	3(5)	0	0(1)	0	0	0	9	0	1	0
24	MF	(Thailand) Sarawin Saengra	1(1)	0	0(1)	0	0	0	3	0	1	0
25	GK	(Thailand) Fahas Bilanglod	0	0	1	0	0	0	1	0	0	0
26	MF	(Thailand) Supasak Sarapee	6	1	0	0	0	0	6	1	0	0
28	FW	(Thailand) Teerasil Dangda	3(1)	1	0	0	0	0	4	1	0	0
29	FW	(Thailand) Chatree Chimtalay	7(6)	1	2	0	0	0	15	1	1	0
30	DF	(Venezuela) (Syria) Andrés Túñez	22	5	2	0	0	0	24	5	4	0
35	FW	(Thailand) Siroch Chatthong	5(14)	2	1(1)	0	0	0	21	2	1	0
39	DF	(Thailand) Piyachanok Darit	1	0	0	0	0	0	1	0	0	0
66	MF	(Japan) Mitsuru Maruoka	3(7)	0	1(1)	1	0	0	12	1	1	0
77	DF	(Philippines) (Spain) Álvaro Silva	0	0	0	0	0	0	0	0	0	0
Players who have played this season and/or sign for the season but had left the club or on loan to other club
7	MF	(Thailand) Chakkit Laptrakul	3	0	0	0	0	0	3	0	0	0
20	MF	(Spain) Toti	10(1)	3	1	0	0	0	12	3	0	0
32	MF	(Japan) Yuki Bamba	1(2)	0	0	0	0	0	3	0	0	0
34	MF	(Thailand) Somyot Pongsuwan	0(1)	0	0	0	0	0	1	0	0	0
36	DF	(Thailand) Suwannapat Kingkaew	2(2)	0	0	0	0	0	4	0	1	0
37	FW	(Brazil) Barros Tardeli	4	0	0	0	0	0	4	0	0	0
99	FW	(Malaysia) Norshahrul Idlan	3(3)	0	0	0	0	0	6	0	0	0
