= 2024–25 Thai FA Cup =

Chang FA Cup

Tournament details
- Country: Thailand
- Dates: 11 September 2024 – 24 May 2025
- Teams: 76

Final positions
- Champions: Buriram United (7th title)
- Runners-up: Muangthong United
- AFC Champions League Elite: Buriram United

Tournament statistics
- Matches played: 75
- Goals scored: 259 (3.45 per match)
- Top goal scorer(s): Guilherme Bissoli, Poramet Arjvirai (7 goals)

Awards
- Best player: Theerathon Bunmathan

The 2024–25 Thai FA Cup is the 31st season of Thai FA Cup, Thailand's top knockout football competition. Officially named the Chang FA Cup (Thai: ช้าง เอฟเอคัพ) due to sponsorship from Chang, the tournament is organized by the Football Association of Thailand and open to clubs across all divisions. 76 clubs entered the competition, which began with the qualification round on 11 September 2024 and will conclude with the final on 24 May 2025.

Clubs from Thai League 2, Thai League 3, the Thailand Semi-pro League, and the Thailand Amateur League compete in the qualification round, with some clubs receiving byes to the first round, which features 64 teams. Thai League 1 clubs automatically enter at this round. Matches in the qualification round proceed to penalties if tied after 90 minutes, while from the first round onward, extra time and penalties are used to determine the winner. All rounds are single-elimination, with home advantage determined by draw, except for the semifinals and final, which are held at neutral venues.

The tournament winner will earn a spot in the 2025–26 AFC Champions League Elite qualifying play-off and the 2025 Thailand Champions Cup. The champion will also receive a prize of 5,000,000 baht, while the runner-up will be awarded 1,000,000 baht. As one of the most prestigious competitions in Thai football, the FA Cup offers clubs from all tiers a chance to compete for national honors.

== Calendar ==
Round	Date	Matches	Clubs	New entries this round
Qualification round	11 September 2024	12	10 + 12 + 2 → 12	10 2024–25 Thai League 2; 12 2024–25 Thai League 3; 2 Thailand Semi-pro League
First round	19–27 November 2024	32	12 + 16 + 6 + 18 + 6 + 6 → 32	16 2024–25 Thai League 1; 6 2024–25 Thai League 2; 18 2024–25 Thai League 3; 6 Thailand Semi-pro League; 6 Thailand Amateur League
Second round	18 December 2024 and 29 January 2025	16	32 → 16	
Third round	9 April 2025	8	16 → 8	
Quarter-finals	23 April 2025 and 3 May 2025	4	8 → 4	
Semi-finals	10 May 2025	2	4 → 2	
Final	24 May 2025	1	2 → Champions	
Total				76 clubs

== Results ==
Note: T1: Clubs from Thai League 1; T2: Clubs from Thai League 2; T3: Clubs from Thai League 3; TS: Clubs from Thailand Semi-pro League; TA: Clubs from Thailand Amateur League.

=== Qualification round ===
The qualification round of the 2024–25 Thai FA Cup featured 24 clubs, comprising 10 clubs from 2024–25 Thai League 2, 12 clubs from 2024–25 Thai League 3, and 2 clubs from the Thailand Semi-pro League. The draw for this round took place on 22 August 2024. 27 goals were scored in this round.

11 September 2024	BFB Pattaya City (T3)	0–3	Rajpracha (T3)	Mueang, Chonburi
15:30 (UTC+7)		Report	Mongkol Tossakrai 82'; Yuthapichai Lertlam 86'; Sirachat Krasaethong 87'	Stadium: Stadium of Thailand National Sports University, Chonburi Campus; Attendance: 150; Referee: Booncharoen Phochai; Assistant referees: Premsak Rungrueang, Puttipong Saensarn; Fourth official: Nattipong Jaimuang

11 September 2024	Chanthaburi (T2)	4–0	UD Vessuwan (TS)	Mueang, Chanthaburi
15:30 (UTC+7)	Nattapoom Maya 76', 90+2'; Bienvenido Marañón 82'; Pongrawit Jantawong 87'	Report		Stadium: Chanthaburi Provincial Stadium; Referee: Chaikrit Inboonsong; Assistant referees: Nattphon Chuensamran, Chaiwat Rupsa-at; Fourth official: Putthipong Issising

11 September 2024	PSU Surat Thani City (T3)	0–1	Kanchanaburi Power (T2)	Mueang, Surat Thani
15:30 (UTC+7)		Report	Cristian Alex 90+1'	Stadium: Stadium of Prince of Songkla University, Surat Thani Campus; Attendance: 88; Referee: Atiwat Seelalo; Assistant referees: Jareon Nunboon, Pornchai Kongdamni; Fourth official: Pornchai Anupan

11 September 2024	Saimit Kabin United (T3)	1–1 (3–4 p)	Lampang (T2)	Kabin Buri, Prachinburi
15:30 (UTC+7)	Bright Friday 72'	Report	Mehti Sarakham 74'	Stadium: Nomklao Maharat Stadium; Referee: Ekkachai Phetcham; Assistant referees: Waranon Soonsuwan, Sujin Rodart; Fourth official: Pongthep Raipimai
	Penalties
	Bright Friday (penalty scored); Noppanai Charoenrung (penalty scored); Yod Chantawong (penalty missed); Surachet Khunnu (penalty scored); Ademola Sodiq Adeyemi (penalty missed)		(penalty scored) Rakpong Chumuang; (penalty scored) Jirattikan Vapilai; (penalty scored) Caio Rodrigues da Cruz; (penalty scored) Pannathon Mungmai

11 September 2024	Surin Khong Chee Mool (T3)	2–0	Samut Prakan City (T2)	Mueang, Surin
15:30 (UTC+7)	Wongsathon Silakul 89'; Aphiwat Chaenban 90+5'	Report		Stadium: Stadium of Rajamangala University of Technology Isan, Surin Campus; Attendance: 150; Referee: Jirawit Phonkaew; Assistant referees: Narong Hansuk, Thinakorn Daensamsuan; Fourth official: Amnat Makklang

11 September 2024	Toko Customs United (T3)	0–1	Banbueng City (TS)	Bang Phli, Samut Prakan
16:30 (UTC+7)		Report	Prawit Jittithaworn 70'	Stadium: Stadium of Customs Department, Lad Krabang 54; Attendance: 125; Referee: Pornthep Promsopa; Assistant referees: Ekkalak Muangkhotr, Jakkarin Pirunkan; Fourth official: Panya Nawasimainam

11 September 2024	Kasetsart (T2)	1–1 (6–7 p)	Roi Et PB United (T3)	Chatuchak, Bangkok
17:00 (UTC+7)	Sarayut Yoosuebchuea 69'	Report	Sakda Manchat 39'	Stadium: Insee Chantarasatit Stadium; Attendance: 764; Referee: Wicharn Klinthaworn; Assistant referees: Nanthawat Chobsuan, Ritthiphong Phimpapan; Fourth official: U-sen Yala
	Penalties
	Steeven Langil (penalty scored); Seksit Srisai (penalty scored); Brinner (penalty missed); Kazuki Murakami (penalty scored); Jakkapan Pornsai (penalty scored); Sarayut Yoosuebchuea (penalty scored); Sarawut Koedsri (penalty scored); Phakapon Boonchuay (penalty missed); Suchanon Malison (penalty missed)		(penalty scored) Nuttawut Chanachan; (penalty scored) Saichon Magmesoog; (penalty scored) Andrey Coutinho; (penalty missed) Sudhkat Phomduang; (penalty scored) Watcharakon Phochai; (penalty scored) Suppalap Tanomlap; (penalty scored) Thammawat Yenram; (penalty missed) Aphisit Thaewkrathok; (penalty scored) Suphakrit Dongchan

11 September 2024	Udon United (T3)	3–0	TPF Uttaradit (T3)	Mueang, Udon Thani
17:30 (UTC+7)	Danuson Wijitpunya 34', 67'; Anuchit Somphakdee 84'	Report		Stadium: Stadium of Thailand National Sports University, Udon Thani Campus; Attendance: 129; Referee: Vitsawa Nanchana; Assistant referees: Srirat Promsang, Supitcha Kittipohthiwong; Fourth official: Jakkaphat Senjanta

11 September 2024	Suphanburi (T2)	1–0	Fleet (T3)	Mueang, Suphanburi
18:00 (UTC+7)	Rapeephat Padthaisong 4'	Report		Stadium: Suphanburi Provincial Stadium; Attendance: 174; Referee: Alongkorn Khonwai; Assistant referees: Khomchalach Lekhawijit, Songrit Trakulchai; Fourth official: Nasri Tamat

11 September 2024	Nakhon Si United (T2)	2–0	Chainat Hornbill (T2)	Mueang, Nakhon Si Thammarat
18:00 (UTC+7)	Rodrigo Maranhão 61'; Crislan 77'	Report		Stadium: Nakhon Si Thammarat Provincial Stadium; Attendance: 375; Referee: Sapuding Kalong; Assistant referees: Phitsanu Chusi, Phongsiri Chusi; Fourth official: Pissanusak Sriyai

11 September 2024	Mahasarakham SBT (T2)	3–1	Thap Luang United (T3)	Mueang, Maha Sarakham
18:00 (UTC+7)	Kittipong Wongma 48'; Nantawat Suankaew 85', 89'	Report	Phuwanet Thongkhui 61'	Stadium: Mahasarakham Provincial Stadium; Attendance: 610; Referee: Jarin Yawapee; Assistant referees: Nuttapong Khunlert, Maitree Nuengkhammee; Fourth official: Prakasit Chantarasawang

11 September 2024	Muang Loei United (T3)	1–1 (5–3 p)	Police Tero (T2)	Mueang, Loei
18:00 (UTC+7)	Mitsada Saitaifah 66'	Report	Anipong Kijkam 88'	Stadium: Stadium of Loei Rajabhat University; Attendance: 185; Referee: Natthwut Nammuang; Assistant referees: Sornram Yutim, Suparak Nilkad; Fourth official: Manuschai Chawong
	Penalties
	Mitsada Saitaifah (penalty scored); Selwan Al-Jaberi (penalty scored); Nonnawat Salad (penalty scored); Aliu Michael Abdul (penalty scored); Thanakon Sathanphong (penalty scored)		(penalty scored) Pichitchai Sienkrthok; (penalty missed) Pinyo Inpinit; (penalty scored) Sphon Noiwong; (penalty scored) Abdulrahman Kelani A.K. Essadi

=== First round ===
The first round consists of 64 clubs, comprising 12 winners from the qualification round and 52 clubs that automatically advanced to this stage. Among the qualification round winners are 6 clubs from the T2, 5 clubs from the T3, and 1 club from the TS. Joining them are 16 clubs from the 2024–25 Thai League 1, who were granted automatic entry as the top-tier league representatives. Additionally, clubs from other leagues received byes directly to the first round, including 6 clubs from the 2024–25 Thai League 2, 18 clubs from the 2024–25 Thai League 3, 6 clubs from the Thailand Semi-pro League, and 6 clubs from the Thailand Amateur League. The draw for this round took place on 17 October 2024. 123 goals were scored in this round.

19 November 2024	Roi Et PB United (T3)	0–4	Buriram United (T1)	Mueang, Roi Et
15:30 (UTC+7)		Report; Highlight	Kenny Dougall 18'; Guilherme Bissoli 35'; Jefferson Tabinas 58'; Supachai Chaided 87'	Stadium: Roi Et Provincial Stadium; Attendance: 2,500; Referee: Sarayut Jakngoen; Assistant referees: Apichit Nophuan, Sumate Peasiri; Fourth official: Thapakorn Thongkon

20 November 2024	APD United (TA)	1–2	VRN Muangnont (T3)	Thanyaburi, Pathum Thani
15:00 (UTC+7)	Araya Sinsuphan 45+3'	Report	Suriya Boridet 9' (o.g.); Phanu Madbok 66' (pen.)	Stadium: Stadium of North Bangkok University; Attendance: 50; Referee: Nattaphak Sawasdee; Assistant referees: Pichet Chumcha, Supakorn Ruangrit; Fourth official: Panuwat Weawkum

20 November 2024	Romklao United (TA)	0–2	Muang Loei United (T3)	Min Buri, Bangkok
15:00 (UTC+7)		Report	Amporn Chaipong 9'; Isrufan Doromae 90+1'	Stadium: Stadium of Kasem Bundit University; Referee: Danai Yommool; Assistant referees: Sujin Rodart, Tanakorn Leechaisathaporn; Fourth official: Theerapat Insena

20 November 2024	Futera United (TS)	0–2	Navy (T3)	Khlong Luang, Pathum Thani
15:00 (UTC+7)		Report	Panigazzi Matías Ignacio 48', 78'	Stadium: Stadium of Valaya Alongkorn Rajabhat University under the Royal Patronage; Referee: Pichit Thongjanmoon; Assistant referees: Watchara Wongkhan, Chakrit Siripong; Fourth official: Jasada Tongkam

20 November 2024	Surin City (T3)	2–0	Ubon Kids City (TS)	Mueang, Surin
15:00 (UTC+7)	Amonthep Kamchadphai 5'; Kroekrit Rodmueang 20'	Report		Stadium: Sri Narong Stadium; Attendance: 118; Referee: Nakarin Thongkerd; Assistant referees: Suksan Thongkoed, Teerapak Saibun; Fourth official: Seksan Wongkam

20 November 2024	Muang Klaeng (TA)	0–6	Huasamrong Gateway (TS)	Wang Chan, Rayong
15:00 (UTC+7)		Report	Rattiarun Charoenrat 22', 72', 74'; Phongsakorn Srilaphat 83', 87', 90'	Stadium: Chum Saeng Subdistrict Municipality Stadium; Attendance: 140; Referee: Watcharasak Intharak; Assistant referees: Komsan Wantavee, Ekkalak Muangkhotr; Fourth official: Niruch Panjontuk

20 November 2024	Surin Khong Chee Mool (T3)	1–5	Chachoengsao Hi-Tek (T3)	Mueang, Surin
15:00 (UTC+7)	Warawut Chariphai 68'	Report	Nyamsi Jacques Dominique 11'; Supasan Arjrod 45+2'; Phakhawat Seekhieo 56'; Chitipat Kaeoyos 62'; Oakkharawut Phakyu 77'	Stadium: Stadium of Rajamangala University of Technology Isan, Surin Campus; Attendance: 37; Referee: Watcharachat Loumpool; Assistant referees: Methas Kumarasit, Waratchanon Chombun; Fourth official: Kulthawat Sisanong

20 November 2024	Nara United (T3)	0–1	Mahasarakham SBT (T2)	Mueang, Narathiwat
15:00 (UTC+7)		Report	Puntakid Pombuppa 6'	Stadium: Narathiwat PAO. Stadium; Attendance: 1,200; Referee: Kriangkrai Thiphanunjarukorn; Assistant referees: Nissan Janthep, Siwat Chaithong; Fourth official: Paisan Bendem-alee

20 November 2024	Banbueng City (TS)	1–2	Rajpracha (T3)	Ban Bueng, Chonburi
15:00 (UTC+7)	Nattawut Namthip 55' (o.g.)	Report	Tirawit Kaothan 45+2'; Nattawut Namthip 65'	Stadium: Ban Bueng Town Municipality Stadium; Attendance: 300; Referee: Theerapon Nakthong; Assistant referees: Siravich Konngam, Peeyaporn Worachaikueakun; Fourth official: Chayapol Laosuphan

20 November 2024	ACDC (T3)	0–2	Nakhon Pathom United (T1)	Sattahip, Chonburi
15:00 (UTC+7)		Report	Nantawat Kokfai 35'; Chaiyaphon Otton 67'	Stadium: Battleship Stadium; Attendance: 119; Referee: Chaikrit Inboonsong; Assistant referees: Pakorn Srichumsin, Kantrakorn Ngaosri; Fourth official: Atiwat Seelalo

20 November 2024	Dome (T3)	0–2	Nakhon Ratchasima Mazda (T1)	Khlong Luang, Pathum Thani
15:00 (UTC+7)		Report	Deyvison Fernandes de Oliveira Silvério 67' (pen.), 82'	Stadium: Stadium of Bangkok University; Attendance: 185; Referee: Satchukorn Saenchu; Assistant referees: Vichet Getkaew, Sarayut Sriampri; Fourth official: Kattiya Saphu

20 November 2024	Vongchavalitkul University (TS)	0–3	Suphanburi (T2)	Mueang, Nakhon Ratchasima
15:00 (UTC+7)		Report	Kanok Kongsimma 9'; Babatunde Olamide Onifade 76'; Chitsanuphong Phimpsang 90+3' (pen.)	Stadium: Stadium of Vongchavalitkul University; Attendance: 150; Referee: Narinnart Tiamskun; Assistant referees: Nuttapong Khunlert, Nattapong Wadweangcom; Fourth official: Prakasit Chantarasawang

20 November 2024	Kamphaengphet (T3)	2–2 (a.e.t.) (13–12 p)	Ayutthaya United (T2)	Mueang, Kamphaeng Phet
15:00 (UTC+7)	Kawin Nuanthat 74', 114'	Report	Phodchara Chainarong 38'; Nethithorn Kaewcharoen 115'	Stadium: Cha Kung Rao Stadium; Attendance: 410; Referee: Samrit Ritkaew; Assistant referees: Apichat Prasasak, Thanet Jairaw; Fourth official: Poowasak Sukunt
	Penalties
	Kawin Nuanthat (penalty scored); Anek Sonsudjai (penalty scored); Ratthapong Aocharot (penalty scored); Napat Phaosiri (penalty scored); Satoshi Kurokawa (penalty scored); Methus Thongnueaha (penalty scored); Patiphol Thosaeng (penalty scored); Wiroch Manoi (penalty scored); Jettawee Sukhoyachai (penalty scored); Harinut Weerakijphanich (penalty scored); Jeremy Zielinski (penalty scored); Kawin Nuanthat (penalty scored); Anek Sonsudjai (penalty scored)		(penalty scored) Wellington Priori; (penalty scored) Passakorn Biaothungnoi; (penalty scored) Kitphom Bunsan; (penalty scored) Chayathorn Tapsuvanavon; (penalty scored) André Luís; (penalty scored) Narakorn Kangkratok; (penalty scored) Kritsanapol Booncharee; (penalty scored) Poom Dhararag; (penalty scored) Bhumchanok Kamkla; (penalty scored) Nethithorn Kaewcharoen; (penalty scored) Suthipong Pisansub; (penalty scored) Wellington Priori; (penalty missed) Passakorn Biaothungnoi

20 November 2024	Lamphun Warriors (T1)	3–1	Prime Bangkok (T3)	Mueang, Lamphun
16:00 (UTC+7)	Victor Cardozo 22'; Tawan Khotrsupho 55'; Jefferson Assis 65'	Report	Chawanwit Saelao 68'	Stadium: Lamphun Warriors Stadium; Attendance: 1,032; Referee: Panumas Phansamo; Assistant referees: Waranyoo Chomgoson, Rachan Dawangpa; Fourth official: Kristin Saisombat

20 November 2024	Samut Sakhon City (T3)	2–0	Udon United (T3)	Mueang, Samut Sakhon
17:00 (UTC+7)	Patiphan Pinsermsootsri 23'; Filipe Vasconcelos Paim 51' (pen.)	Report		Stadium: Stadium of Thailand National Sports University, Samut Sakhon Campus; Attendance: 270; Referee: Piyapong Thongkhain; Assistant referees: Songrit Trakulchai, Tanutpon Sunyapluem; Fourth official: Amnat Rattanapakdee

20 November 2024	Udon Thani City (TA)	1–3 (a.e.t.)	Lopburi City (T3)	Mueang, Udon Thani
17:00 (UTC+7)	Watcharapong Pakpiphruk 87'	Report	Kitti Kinnonkok 90+2'; Arnont Pumsiri 98'; Jiraaut Wingwon 108'	Stadium: Udon Thani SAT Stadium; Attendance: 300; Referee: Phanu Phalhaphon; Assistant referees: Jakkrit Nahuanin, Natthaphong Saengsuwannarat; Fourth official: Jakkrit Pratum

20 November 2024	Lampang (T2)	2–1	Warin Chamrap (TS)	Mueang, Lampang
17:00 (UTC+7)	Chakrit Champasrl 14' (o.g.); Judivan 74'	Report	Narawit Chaiyarak 15'	Stadium: Lampang Provincial Stadium; Attendance: 380; Referee: Woottipong Ketkam; Assistant referees: Nattawut Pornchaiwirun, Sumetee Khaokaew; Fourth official: Wirot Oupachit

20 November 2024	Phrae United (T2)	2–1	Phitsanulok (T3)	Mueang, Phrae
17:30 (UTC+7)	Tatsuhide Shimizu 22'; Settawut Wongsai 90'	Report	Ekene Victor Azike 42'	Stadium: Huai Ma Stadium; Attendance: 591; Referee: Direk Kaort; Assistant referees: Natthawut Tasmak, Suwit Kongtongnok; Fourth official: Wathanyu Morin

20 November 2024	Chanthaburi (T2)	4–0	Maraleina (T3)	Mueang, Chanthaburi
17:30 (UTC+7)	Bienvenido Marañón 47', 49'; Tiago Chulapa 67'; Marut Budrak 83'	Report		Stadium: Chanthaburi Provincial Stadium; Attendance: 124; Referee: Putthipong Issising; Assistant referees: Chaiyos Sripak, Kittinan Sotorphrphakorn; Fourth official: Anucha Pinamon

20 November 2024	Khon Kaen (T3)	8–0	Thonburi Forest (TA)	Mueang, Khon Kaen
18:00 (UTC+7)	Kitsada Hemvipat 17'; João Guimarães 28'; Jhonata Pereira dos Santos 35', 81'; Piyapong Srikaew 42'; Kitchaphum Monthianart 61', 90', 90+3'	Report		Stadium: Khon Kaen PAO. Stadium; Attendance: 380; Referee: Wuttiphat Khuttawong; Assistant referees: Weerasak Dookkhumnoom, Tanade Intasan; Fourth official: Kittipong Pholdee

20 November 2024	Padriew City (T3)	0–5	Kasem Bundit University (T3)	Mueang, Chachoengsao
18:00 (UTC+7)		Report	Apiwat Chuprai 45+1', 80'; Chinonso Kingsley Thomas 50', 67' (pen.); Ariya Thokaew 71'	Stadium: Chachoengsao Provincial Stadium; Attendance: 200; Referee: Chaiwat Rupsa-at; Assistant referees: Premsak Rungrueang, Apidet Rawangton; Fourth official: Puttipong Saensarn

20 November 2024	Ratchaburi (T1)	5–0	Bankhai United (T3)	Mueang, Ratchaburi
18:00 (UTC+7)	Siwakorn Jakkuprasat 10'; Mohamed Mara 21'; Kim Ji-min 81'; Phongsakorn Sangkasopha 85'; Jakkaphan Kaewprom 90+2'	Report		Stadium: Dragon Solar Park; Attendance: 844; Referee: Pawara Seejen; Assistant referees: Banpot Khunhong, Kiadtisak Janmol; Fourth official: Nasri Tamat

20 November 2024	Bangkok United (T1)	3–1	Pattaya United (T2)	Khlong Luang, Pathum Thani
18:00 (UTC+7)	Thossawat Limwannasathian 18'; Richairo Živković 23'; Mahmoud Eid 77'	Report; Highlight	Narakorn Khana 6'	Stadium: Thammasat Stadium; Attendance: 605; Referee: Phairot Bunkamnoed; Assistant referees: Tanin Reunjit, Chaiya Sripak; Fourth official: U-sen Yala

20 November 2024	Nakhon Si United (T2)	4–2 (a.e.t.)	Muang Trang United (T3)	Mueang, Nakhon Si Thammarat
18:00 (UTC+7)	Taninnat Athisaraworameth 65'; Diogo Júnior Pereira 87' (o.g.); Soukaphone Vongchiengkham 93'; Netisat Klapdee 114'	Report	William Henrique 35'; Chananon Wisetbamrungcharoen 57'	Stadium: Nakhon Si Thammarat Provincial Stadium; Attendance: 300; Referee: Sapuding Kalong; Assistant referees: Tuwae-yusoh Kuji, Yossapon Tongprom; Fourth official: Matoha Sayo

20 November 2024	Bangkok (T2)	7–0	Phachi City (TA)	Min Buri, Bangkok
18:00 (UTC+7)	Amornthep Maundee 5'; Chaowasit Sapysakunphon 16', 26'; Woraphot Somsang 23'; Kasitinard Sriphirom 75', 77', 88'	Report		Stadium: 72nd Anniversary Stadium, Min Buri; Attendance: 173; Referee: Boonsong Prachumrak; Assistant referees: Sahatnet Deemongkol, Authen Dansalao; Fourth official: Wichate Tainthong

20 November 2024	Nongbua Pitchaya (T1)	4–3 (a.e.t.)	Khon Kaen United (T1)	Mueang, Nong Bua Lamphu
18:00 (UTC+7)	Wutthichai Marom 15'; Jardel 36'; Marcus Haber 60'; Siriwat Ingkaew 105+1' (o.g.)	Report; Highlight	Niphitpon Hadchan 6'; Lee Sang-jin 25'; Steve Ambri 41'	Stadium: Pitchaya Stadium; Attendance: 1,142; Referee: Noppadet Mangngam; Assistant referees: Binla Preeda, Watthana Chonchanakul; Fourth official: Somkhid Sarapim

20 November 2024	Chonburi (T2)	2–1	PT Prachuap (T1)	Mueang, Chonburi
18:30 (UTC+7)	Santipap Ratniyorm 6'; Kittipong Sansanit 16'	Report; Highlight	Airton 66'	Stadium: Chonburi Daikin Stadium; Attendance: 2,955; Referee: Chaireag Ngam-som; Assistant referees: Phubes Lekpha, Pathompong Anunluksanakul; Fourth official: Komgrit Ponpasit

20 November 2024	Chiangrai United (T1)	6–0	Phetchabun United (TS)	Mueang, Chiang Rai
18:30 (UTC+7)	Ongsa Singthong 4', 41'; Pattara Soimalai 59'; Sittichok Kannoo 63'; Chinnawat Prachuapmon 67'; Win Naing Tun 74' (pen.)	Report		Stadium: Singha Chiangrai Stadium; Attendance: 118; Referee: Kotchapoom Meesridaecha; Assistant referees: Kasama Loyma, Narin Wongprapipak; Fourth official: Pongthep Raipimai

20 November 2024	Rayong (T1)	3–2	Kanchanaburi Power (T2)	Mueang, Rayong
19:00 (UTC+7)	Jetsada Batchari 67', 87'; Hiromichi Katano 86'	Report; Highlight	Suwat Junboonpha 7' (o.g.); Cristian Alex 30'	Stadium: Rayong Provincial Stadium; Attendance: 707; Referee: Vitsavet Sangnakorn; Assistant referees: Chaowalit Poonprasit, Waranon Soonsuwan; Fourth official: Phadoongkiat Piangdee

20 November 2024	Port (T1)	1–2	BG Pathum United (T1)	Khlong Toei, Bangkok
19:00 (UTC+7)	Lonsana Doumbouya 60'	Report; Highlight	Raniel 31'; Ilhan Fandi 78'	Stadium: PAT Stadium; Attendance: 4,389; Referee: Niwat Insa-ard; Assistant referees: Pattarapong Kijsathit, Chotrawee Tongduang; Fourth official: Alongkorn Khonwai

20 November 2024	Muangthong United (T1)	3–0	Sisaket United (T2)	Pak Kret, Nonthaburi
20:00 (UTC+7)	Felicio Brown Forbes 12', 45+4'; Kakana Khamyok 26'	Report; Highlight		Stadium: Thunderdome Stadium; Attendance: 16,279; Referee: Winat Phophat; Assistant referees: Rawut Nakarit, Natthaphon Mala; Fourth official: Sila Jinnigorn

27 November 2024	Uthai Thani (T1)	0–1 (a.e.t.)	Sukhothai (T1)	Mueang, Uthai Thani
19:00 (UTC+7)		Report; Highlight	Matheus Fornazari Custódio 104'	Stadium: Uthai Thani Provincial Stadium; Attendance: 2,019; Referee: Jirawit Phonkaew; Assistant referees: Suriya Lee-intr, Srisuwan Boonnum; Fourth official: Veeraporn Maophaeo

=== Second round ===
The second round consists of 32 clubs, all securing victories in the first round. This stage features 12 clubs from the T1, 8 clubs from the T2, 11 clubs from the T3, and 1 club from the TS. The draw for this round took place on 22 November 2024. 45 goals were scored in this round.

18 December 2024	Mahasarakham SBT (T2)	0–5	Buriram United (T1)	Mueang, Maha Sarakham
19:00 (UTC+7)		Report; Highlight	Guilherme Bissoli 38', 45+2', 63'; Supachai Chaided 67'; Athit Berg 74'	Stadium: Mahasarakham Provincial Stadium; Attendance: 4,535; Referee: Jirawit Phonkaew; Assistant referees: Phubes Lekpha, Waranyoo Chomgoson; Fourth official: Putthipong Issising

29 January 2025	Kamphaengphet (T3)	0–2	Samut Sakhon City (T3)	Mueang, Kamphaeng Phet
15:00 (UTC+7)		Report	Arnon Prasongporn 49'; Burnel Okana-Stazi 75'	Stadium: Cha Kung Rao Stadium; Attendance: 47; Referee: Piyapong Thongkhain; Assistant referees: Songrit Trakulchai, Natthawut Tasmak; Fourth official: Woottipong Ketkam

29 January 2025	Kasem Bundit University (T3)	0–0 (a.e.t.) (5–6 p)	Chanthaburi (T2)	Min Buri, Bangkok
15:00 (UTC+7)		Report		Stadium: Stadium of Kasem Bundit University; Attendance: 200; Referee: Kriangkrai Thiphanunjarukorn; Assistant referees: Sarayut Sriampri, Kittinan Sotorphrphakorn; Fourth official: Nasri Tamat
	Penalties
	Chinonso Kingsley Thomas (penalty scored); Natthakorn Yoogtananta (penalty scored); Satayu Tonart (penalty scored); Ariya Thokaew (penalty scored); John Owoeri (penalty scored); Weerapap Sarapan (penalty missed)		(penalty scored) Tiago Chulapa; (penalty scored) Pongrawit Jantawong; (penalty scored) Thammayut Tonkham; (penalty scored) Jeferson Elías; (penalty scored) Natthaphon Piamplai; (penalty scored) Nattawut Dantrawen

29 January 2025	Rajpracha (T3)	1–0 (a.e.t.)	VRN Muangnont (T3)	Bang Yai, Nonthaburi
16:00 (UTC+7)	Timothy Chiemerie Okereke 104'	Report		Stadium: Nonthaburi Stadium; Attendance: 191; Referee: Alongkorn Feemuechang; Assistant referees: Kunathorn Ketchantra, Yanin Nanthakampira; Fourth official: Piyawat Rittimunee

29 January 2025	Phrae United (T2)	1–0	Rayong (T1)	Mueang, Phrae
17:30 (UTC+7)	Ekkalarp Hanpanichkij 57'	Report; Highlight		Stadium: Huai Ma Stadium; Attendance: 465; Referee: Sarayut Jakngoen; Assistant referees: Chaowalit Poonprasit, Wirot Lokham; Fourth official: U-sen Yala

29 January 2025	Lopburi City (T3)	0–3	BG Pathum United (T1)	Mueang, Lopburi
18:00 (UTC+7)		Report; Highlight	Marco Ballini 15'; Ilhan Fandi 35'; Kanokpon Buspakom 77'	Stadium: Phra Ramesuan Stadium; Attendance: 3,825; Referee: Natee Choosuwan; Assistant referees: Kasama Loyma, Sahatnet Deemongkol; Fourth official: Vitsavet Sangnakorn

29 January 2025	Nakhon Si United (T2)	2–2 (a.e.t.) (5–4 p)	Lampang (T2)	Mueang, Nakhon Si Thammarat
18:00 (UTC+7)	Adisak Sensom-Eiad 45+2'; Rodrigo Maranhão 66'	Report	Kraiwit Boonlue 10'; Caio Rodrigues da Cruz 74'	Stadium: Nakhon Si Thammarat Provincial Stadium; Attendance: 432; Referee: Boonsong Prachumrak; Assistant referees: Pathompong Anunluksanakul, Waranon Soonsuwan; Fourth official: Atiwat Seelalo
	Penalties
	Rodrigo Maranhão (penalty scored); Kento Nagasaki (penalty scored); Bianor das Graças Lima da Silva Neto (penalty scored); Ronnapee Chaicumde (penalty missed); Siwarut Pholhirun (penalty scored); Taninnat Athisaraworameth (penalty scored)		(penalty scored) Caio Rodrigues da Cruz; (penalty scored) Alex Flávio; (penalty scored) Taiga Matsunaga; (penalty scored) Mehti Sarakham; (penalty missed) Patrick Cruz; (penalty missed) Nakarin Butaka

29 January 2025	Sukhothai (T1)	4–0	Muang Loei United (T3)	Mueang, Sukhothai
18:00 (UTC+7)	Narongrit Kamnet 16'; Thitiwat Phranmaen 48', 53'; Eito Ishimoto 78'	Report		Stadium: Thalay Luang Stadium; Attendance: 1,060; Referee: Thapakorn Thongkon; Assistant referees: Worapong Prasartsri, Sumate Peasiri; Fourth official: Chaireag Ngam-som

29 January 2025	Huasamrong Gateway (TS)	0–1 (a.e.t.)	Surin City (T3)	Mueang, Chachoengsao
18:00 (UTC+7)		Report	Watthanapon Chinthong 116' (pen.)	Stadium: Chachoengsao Town Municipality Stadium; Attendance: 110; Referee: Nararit Srivorakul; Assistant referees: Ekkalak Muangkhotr, Chinnaphat Lablae; Fourth official: Watcharasak Intharak

29 January 2025	Bangkok (T2)	2–3	Suphanburi (T2)	Thung Khru, Bangkok
18:00 (UTC+7)	Thanakorn Pornrumdet 17' (o.g.); Wachirawut Phudithip 45'	Report	Saharat Sontisawat 67'; Yuri Martins Rocha 69'; Sittichok Paso 90+3'	Stadium: 72nd Anniversary Stadium, Bang Mot; Attendance: 1,250; Referee: Direk Kaort; Assistant referees: Khomchalach Lekhawijit, Siwat Chaithong; Fourth official: Wirot Oupachit

29 January 2025	Khon Kaen (T3)	3–1	Chachoengsao Hi-Tek (T3)	Mueang, Khon Kaen
18:00 (UTC+7)	Punyachotc Namjatturat 10', 23'; João Guimarães 45+1'	Report	Supasan Arjrod 8'	Stadium: Khon Kaen PAO. Stadium; Attendance: 514; Referee: Songkiat Chaengchan; Assistant referees: Kittichot Worasan, Sitthisak Khammong; Fourth official: Kroekkiad Laosing

29 January 2025	Bangkok United (T1)	3–0	Nongbua Pitchaya (T1)	Khlong Luang, Pathum Thani
18:00 (UTC+7)	Muhsen Al-Ghassani 68', 85'; Mahmoud Eid 89'	Report; Highlight		Stadium: Thammasat Stadium; Attendance: 10,500; Referee: Songkran Bunmeekiart; Assistant referees: Rawut Nakarit, Watthana Chonchanakul; Fourth official: Paisan Bendem-alee

29 January 2025	Nakhon Ratchasima Mazda (T1)	2–1	Chonburi (T2)	Mueang, Nakhon Ratchasima
18:30 (UTC+7)	Dennis Murillo 39'; Nattawut Jaroenboot 78'	Report; Highlight	Kittipong Sansanit 67'	Stadium: His Majesty the King's 80th Birthday Anniversary Stadium; Attendance: 3,931; Referee: Sivakorn Pu-udom; Assistant referees: Tanate Chuchuen, Rachan Dawangpa; Fourth official: Sahapop Sriboonlue

29 January 2025	Ratchaburi (T1)	3–0	Navy (T3)	Mueang, Ratchaburi
18:30 (UTC+7)	Clément Depres 10', 26'; Kim Ji-min 40'	Report; Highlight		Stadium: Dragon Solar Park; Attendance: 697; Referee: Phairot Bunkamnoed; Assistant referees: Binla Preeda, Natthaphon Mala; Fourth official: Kristin Saisombat

29 January 2025	Nakhon Pathom United (T1)	0–4	Muangthong United (T1)	Mueang, Nakhon Pathom
19:00 (UTC+7)		Report; Highlight	Melvyn Lorenzen 26', 28', 86'; Tristan Do 54'	Stadium: Nakhon Pathom Municipality Sports School Stadium; Attendance: 1,224; Referee: Wiwat Jumpaoon; Assistant referees: Pattarapong Kijsathit, Rachain Srichai; Fourth official: Kotchapoom Meesridaecha

29 January 2025	Chiangrai United (T1)	2–0	Lamphun Warriors (T1)	Mueang, Chiang Rai
19:00 (UTC+7)	Chinnawat Prachuapmon 79'; Carlos Iury Bezerra da Silva 81'	Report; Highlight		Stadium: Singha Chiangrai Stadium; Attendance: 390; Referee: Noppadet Mangngam; Assistant referees: Chotrawee Tongduang, Suriya Lee-intr; Fourth official: Peerasan Krataithong

=== Third round ===
The third round consists of 16 clubs, all securing victories in the second round. This stage features 8 clubs from the T1, 4 clubs from the T2, and 4 clubs from the T3. The draw for this round took place on 4 February 2025. 31 goals were scored in this round.

9 April 2025	Samut Sakhon City (T3)	1–4	Nakhon Ratchasima Mazda (T1)	Mueang, Samut Sakhon
17:00 (UTC+7)	Warayut Klomnak 27'	Report; Highlight	Supawit Romphopak 11'; Greg Houla 58'; Deyvison Fernandes de Oliveira Silvério 62'; Somkaet Kunmee 83'	Stadium: Stadium of Thailand National Sports University, Samut Sakhon Campus; Attendance: 690; Referee: Songkran Bunmeekiart; Assistant referees: Watthana Chonchanakul, Yossapon Tongprom; Fourth official: Satchukorn Saenchu

9 April 2025	Khon Kaen (T3)	0–1	Sukhothai (T1)	Mueang, Khon Kaen
18:00 (UTC+7)		Report; Highlight	Matheus Fornazari Custódio 87'	Stadium: Khon Kaen PAO. Stadium; Attendance: 583; Referee: Anusorn Nookaew; Assistant referees: Tanate Chuchuen, Natthaphon Mala; Fourth official: Phairot Bunkamnoed

9 April 2025	Suphanburi (T2)	1–7	Ratchaburi (T1)	Mueang, Suphanburi
18:00 (UTC+7)	Sittichok Paso 10'	Report; Highlight	Tana 14', 58'; Njiva Rakotoharimalala 29'; Clément Depres 53', 73'; Shinnaphat Leeaoh 85'; Phongsakorn Sangkasopha 90+3'	Stadium: Suphanburi Provincial Stadium; Attendance: 554; Referee: Niwat Insa-ard; Assistant referees: Pattarapong Kijsathit, Poonsawat Samransuk; Fourth official: Chaireag Ngam-som

9 April 2025	Bangkok United (T1)	1–2 (a.e.t.)	Muangthong United (T1)	Khlong Luang, Pathum Thani
18:00 (UTC+7)	Rungrath Poomchantuek 104'	Report; Highlight	Thiraphat Nuntagowat 97'; Poramet Arjvirai 118'	Stadium: Thammasat Stadium; Attendance: 1,279; Referee: Sivakorn Pu-udom; Assistant referees: Rawut Nakarit, Komsan Kampan; Fourth official: Pawara Seejen

9 April 2025	Surin City (T3)	1–4	BG Pathum United (T1)	Mueang, Surin
18:00 (UTC+7)	Kroekrit Rodmueang 90'	Report; Highlight	Nuttawut Wongsawang 18'; Warinthon Jamnongwat 21'; Ikhsan Fandi 64'; Chananan Pombuppha 70'	Stadium: Sri Narong Stadium; Attendance: 4,700; Referee: Noppadet Mangngam; Assistant referees: Rachan Dawangpa, Phubes Lekpha; Fourth official: Sahapop Sriboonlue

9 April 2025	Phrae United (T2)	2–1	Nakhon Si United (T2)	Mueang, Phrae
18:30 (UTC+7)	Tatsuhide Shimizu 3', 74'	Report; Highlight	Rodrigo Maranhão 25'	Stadium: Huai Ma Stadium; Attendance: 707; Referee: Sarayut Jakngoen; Assistant referees: Waranyoo Chomgoson, Songrit Trakulchai; Fourth official: Putthipong Issising

9 April 2025	Chanthaburi (T2)	2–1	Rajpracha (T3)	Mueang, Chanthaburi
18:30 (UTC+7)	Tiago Chulapa 26', 73'	Report; Highlight	Nattachai Srisuwan 84'	Stadium: Chanthaburi Provincial Stadium; Attendance: 987; Referee: Kristin Saisombat; Assistant referees: Kiadtisak Janmol, Kantrakorn Ngaosri; Fourth official: Ekkachai Phetcham

9 April 2025	Buriram United (T1)	2–1 (a.e.t.)	Chiangrai United (T1)	Mueang, Buriram
19:00 (UTC+7)	Dion Cools 42'; Goran Čaušić 111' (pen.)	Report; Highlight	Jordan Emaviwe 17'	Stadium: Buriram City Stadium; Attendance: 8,933; Referee: Thapakorn Thongkon; Assistant referees: Worapong Prasartsri, Sumate Peasiri; Fourth official: Jirawit Phonkaew

=== Quarter-finals ===
The quarter-finals consist of 8 clubs, all securing victories in the third round. This stage features 6 clubs from the T1, and 2 clubs from the T2. The draw for this round took place on 11 April 2025. 20 goals were scored in this round.

23 April 2025	Ratchaburi (T1)	7–1	Phrae United (T2)	Mueang, Ratchaburi
18:00 (UTC+7)	Sirawit Kasonsumol 23'; Clément Depres 43', 48'; Thanawat Suengchitthawon 58'; Phongsakorn Sangkasopha 67'; Njiva Rakotoharimalala 73', 87'	Report; Highlight	Woranat Thongkruea 45'	Stadium: Dragon Solar Park; Attendance: 1,127; Referee: Sivakorn Pu-udom; Assistant referees: Chaowalit Poonprasit, Poonsawat Samransuk; Fourth official: Chaireag Ngam-som

23 April 2025	Sukhothai (T1)	2–5	Muangthong United (T1)	Mueang, Sukhothai
18:00 (UTC+7)	Baggio Rakotonomenjanahary 30' (pen.); Hikaru Matsui 74'	Report; Highlight	Poramet Arjvirai 21', 72'; Melvyn Lorenzen 26'; Emil Roback 33' (pen.); Kakana Khamyok 39'	Stadium: Thalay Luang Stadium; Attendance: 3,109; Referee: Warintron Sassadee; Assistant referees: Pattarapong Kijsathit, Tanin Reunjit; Fourth official: Panumas Phansamo

23 April 2025	Nakhon Ratchasima Mazda (T1)	1–3	BG Pathum United (T1)	Mueang, Nakhon Ratchasima
19:00 (UTC+7)	Dennis Murillo 63'	Report; Highlight	Marco Ballini 16'; Ilhan Fandi 45+2'; Raniel 81' (pen.)	Stadium: His Majesty the King's 80th Birthday Anniversary Stadium; Attendance: 5,632; Referee: Songkran Bunmeekiart; Assistant referees: Rachan Dawangpa, Srisuwan Boonnum; Fourth official: Niwat Insa-ard

3 May 2025	Chanthaburi (T2)	0–1	Buriram United (T1)	Mueang, Chanthaburi
18:00 (UTC+7)		Report; Highlight	Guilherme Bissoli 57'	Stadium: Chanthaburi PAO. Stadium; Attendance: 6,279; Referee: Wiwat Jumpaoon; Assistant referees: Tanate Chuchuen, Banpot Khunhong; Fourth official: Kotchapoom Meesridaecha

=== Semi-finals ===
The semi-finals consist of 4 clubs, all from the T1. These clubs progressed to this stage after winning their respective matches in the quarter-finals. The draw for this round took place on 25 April 2025. 8 goals were scored in this round.

10 May 2025	Muangthong United (T1)	3–2	Ratchaburi (T1)	Mueang, Chonburi
18:00 (UTC+7)	Melvyn Lorenzen 5'; Poramet Arjvirai 25', 89'	Report; Highlight	Tana 2'; Kim Ji-min 16'	Stadium: Chonburi Daikin Stadium; Attendance: 3,819; Referee: Du Jianxin; Assistant referees: Luo Zheng, Wu Mingfeng; Fourth official: Pansa Chaisanit

10 May 2025	Buriram United (T1)	3–0	BG Pathum United (T1)	Mueang, Ratchaburi
19:00 (UTC+7)	Jefferson Tabinas 47'; Goran Čaušić 54'; Supachai Chaided 75'	Report; Highlight		Stadium: Dragon Solar Park; Attendance: 4,484; Referee: Choi Hyun-jai; Assistant referees: Park Sang-jun, Shin Jae-hwan; Fourth official: Kitisak Pikunngoen

=== Final ===
The final consists of 2 clubs, both from the T1. These clubs progressed to this stage after winning their respective matches in the semi-finals. 5 goals were scored in this round.

24 May 2025	Muangthong United (T1)	2–3	Buriram United (T1)	Khlong Luang, Pathum Thani
18:00 (UTC+7)	Poramet Arjvirai 45+5' (pen.), 72'	Report; Highlight	Guilherme Bissoli 27' (pen.), 51'; Goran Čaušić 35'	Stadium: Thammasat Stadium; Attendance: 16,370; Referee: Wang Di; Assistant referees: Ma Ji, Tang Chao; Fourth official: Songkran Bunmeekiart

== Tournament statistics ==
=== Top goalscorers ===
Rank	Player	Club	Goals
1	(Brazil) Guilherme Bissoli	Buriram United	7
1	(Thailand) Poramet Arjvirai	Muangthong United	7
3	(France) Clément Depres	Ratchaburi	6
4	(Germany) Melvyn Lorenzen	Muangthong United	5
5	(Thailand) Kasitinard Sriphirom	Bangkok	3
5	(Singapore) Ilhan Fandi	BG Pathum United	3
5	(Serbia) Goran Čaušić	Buriram United	3
5	(Thailand) Supachai Chaided	Buriram United	3
5	(Philippines) Bienvenido Marañón	Chanthaburi	3
5	(Brazil) Tiago Chulapa	Chanthaburi	3
5	(Thailand) Phongsakorn Srilaphat	Huasamrong Gateway	3
5	(Thailand) Rattiarun Charoenrat	Huasamrong Gateway	3
5	(Thailand) Kitchaphum Monthianart	Khon Kaen	3
5	(Brazil) Deyvison Fernandes de Oliveira Silvério	Nakhon Ratchasima Mazda	3
5	(Brazil) Rodrigo Maranhão	Nakhon Si United	3
5	(Japan) Tatsuhide Shimizu	Phrae United	3
5	(South Korea) Kim Ji-min	Ratchaburi	3
5	(Madagascar) Njiva Rakotoharimalala	Ratchaburi	3
5	(Thailand) Phongsakorn Sangkasopha	Ratchaburi	3
5	(Spain) Tana	Ratchaburi	3

=== Hat-tricks ===
Player	For	Against	Result	Date	Round
(Thailand) Rattiarun Charoenrat	Huasamrong Gateway (TS)	Muang Klaeng (TA)	6–0 (A)	20 November 2024	First round
(Thailand) Phongsakorn Srilaphat	Huasamrong Gateway (TS)	Muang Klaeng (TA)	6–0 (A)	20 November 2024	First round
(Thailand) Kitchaphum Monthianart	Khon Kaen (T3)	Thonburi Forest (TA)	8–0 (H)	20 November 2024	First round
(Thailand) Kasitinard Sriphirom	Bangkok (T2)	Phachi City (TA)	7–0 (H)	20 November 2024	First round
(Brazil) Guilherme Bissoli	Buriram United (T1)	Mahasarakham SBT (T2)	5–0 (A)	18 December 2024	Second round
(Germany) Melvyn Lorenzen	Muangthong United (T1)	Nakhon Pathom United (T1)	4–0 (A)	29 January 2025	Second round

Notes: (H) = Home team; (A) = Away team

== See also ==
- 2024–25 Thai League 1
- 2024–25 Thai League 2
- 2024–25 Thai League 3
- 2024–25 Thai League 3 Northern Region
- 2024–25 Thai League 3 Central Region
- 2024–25 Thai League 3 Northeastern Region
- 2024–25 Thai League 3 Eastern Region
- 2024–25 Thai League 3 Western Region
- 2024–25 Thai League 3 Southern Region
- 2024–25 Thai League 3 National Championship
- 2025 Thailand Semi-pro League
- 2024–25 Thai League Cup
- 2024 Thai U23 League
