= Yuki Bamba =

Japanese footballer

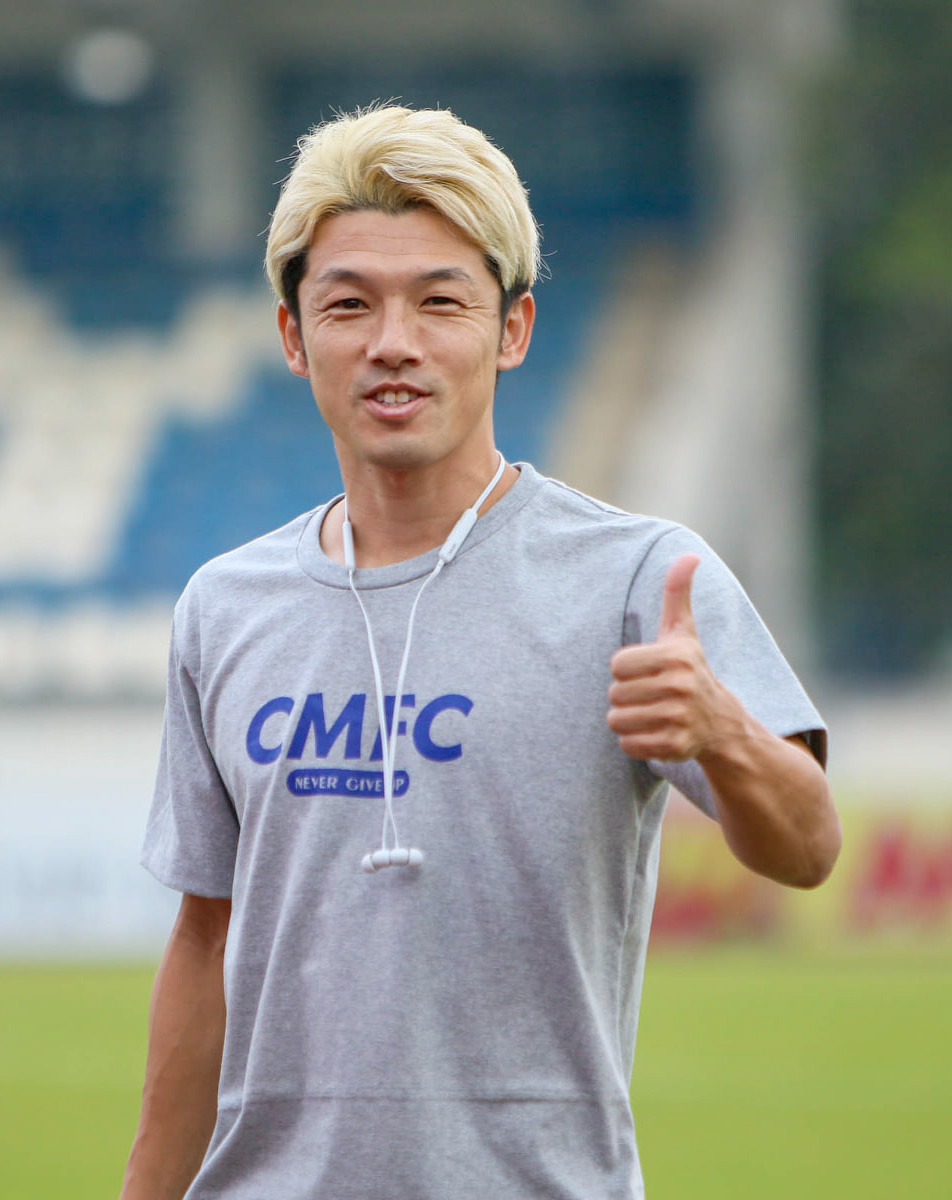
- Bamba in 2021

Personal information
- Full name: Yuki Bamba
- Date of birth: 2 August 1986 (age 40)
- Place of birth: Omihachiman, Shiga Prefecture, Japan
- Height: 1.70 m (5 ft 7 in)
- Position: Midfielder

Youth career
- 2002–2004: Kusatsu Higashi High School

College career
Years	Team	Apps	(Gls)
2005–2008	Kyoto Sangyo University		

Senior career*
Years	Team	Apps	(Gls)
2009–2011	Sagawa Shiga	50	(3)
2012	Suphanburi		
2013	Bangkok		
2014	Chonburi	17	(1)
2015	BBCU		
2016–2017	Thai Honda		
2017	Nakhon Pathom		
2017–2018	Trat		
2019–2021	BG Pathum United	17	(2)
2019	→ Trat (loan)	13	(2)
2020–2021	→ Chiangmai (loan)	29	(1)
2021–2022	Navy	8	(1)
2022–2023	Lampang	32	(10)
2023–2024	Suphanburi	32	(5)
- * Club domestic league appearances and goals as of 7 December 2023 (UTC)

Yuki Bamba (馬場 悠企, Bamba Yuki; born 2 August 1986) is a Japanese footballer.

== Career statistics ==
=== Club ===
As of 3 November 2019.

Club	Season	League			Cup		Continental		Other		Total	
Club	Season	Division	Apps	Goals	Apps	Goals	Apps	Goals	Apps	Goals	Apps	Goals
Sagawa Shiga	2009	Japan Football League	25	0	1 (Note: Appearances in the Emperor's Cup)	0	–		0	0	16	0
Sagawa Shiga	2010	Japan Football League	11	1	0	0	–		0	0	11	1
Sagawa Shiga	2011	Japan Football League	14	2	2	0	–		0	0	16	2
Sagawa Shiga	Total		50	3	3	0	0	0	0	0	53	3
Chonburi	2014	Thai Premier League	17	1	1 (Note: Appearances in the FA Cup)	0	0	0	0	0	18	1
Trat (loan)	2019	Thai League 1	13	2	0	0	0	0	0	0	13	2
Career total			80	6	4	0	0	0	0	0	84	6

== Honour ==
Thai Honda

- Thai Division 1 League: 2016
