= Tossaphol Chomchon =

Thai footballer

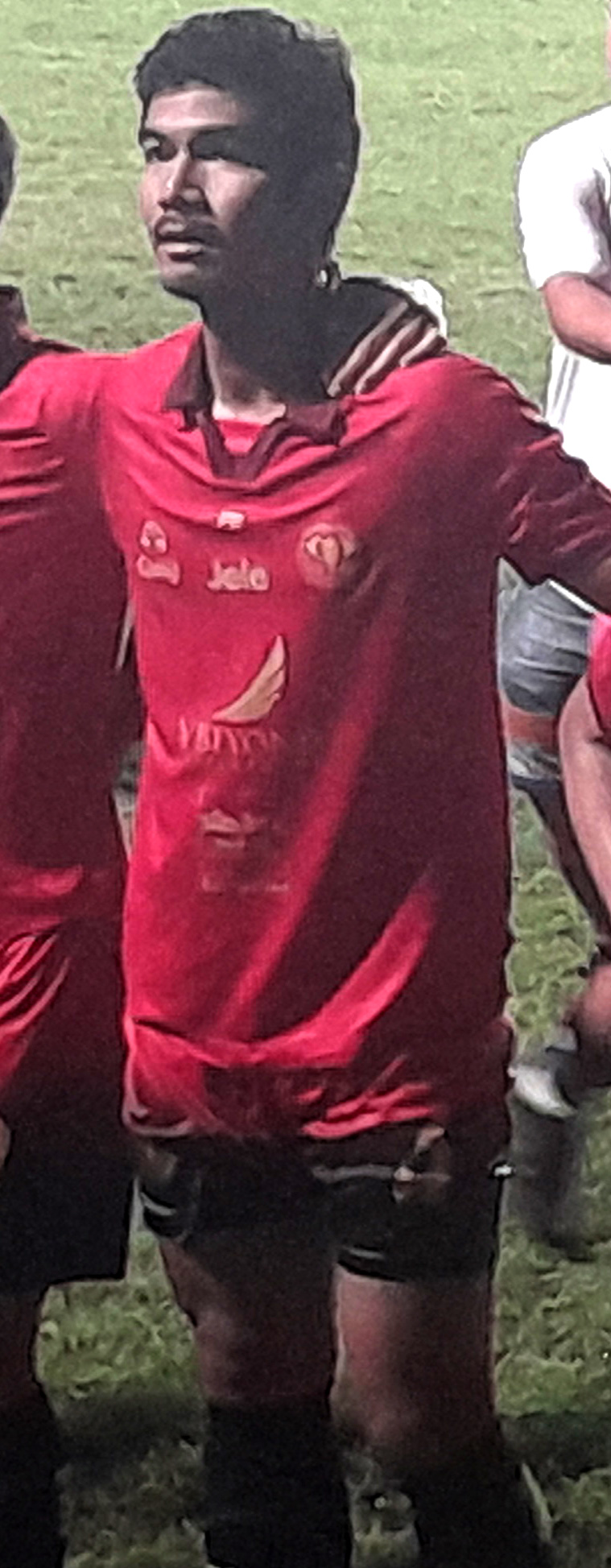
- THOSSAPOL CHOMCHON Chiangmai United April 6 2025.

Personal information
- Full name: Tossaphol Chomchon
- Date of birth: 9 December 1989 (age 36)
- Place of birth: Khon Kaen, Thailand
- Height: 1.79 m (5 ft 10 in)
- Position: Centre-back

Team information
- Current team: Chiangmai United
- Number: 6

Senior career*
Years	Team	Apps	(Gls)
2015	Bangkok Glass	1	(0)
2016	Chiangmai	0	(0)
2016–2022	BG Pathum United	23	(0)
2019	→ Chiangmai (loan)	14	(0)
2022	Khon Kaen United	6	(0)
2023	Ayutthaya United	17	(1)
2023–	Chiangmai United	10	(1)
- * Club domestic league appearances and goals as of 10 December 2023

Tossaphol Chomchon (Thai: ทศพล ชมชน; born 9 December 1989) is a Thai professional footballer who plays as a centre-back for Thai League 2 club Chiangmai United.

== Honours ==
=== Club ===
BG Pathum United

- Thai League 1 (1): 2020–21
