= Bright Friday (footballer) =

Nigerian footballer

Personal information
- Date of birth: 13 December 1998 (age 27)
- Place of birth: Lagos, Nigeria
- Position: Midfielder

Team information
- Current team: Maejo United
- Number: 70

Senior career*
Years	Team	Apps	(Gls)
2017–2018	FK Egnatia	8	(0)
2018	→ Shkumbini Peqin (loan)	14	(3)
2018	FK Tomori Berat	12	(3)
2019	FK Shënkolli	12	(2)
2022	Dakkada	6	(0)
2023–2024	Thonburi United	23	(11)
2024	Saimit Kabin United	6	(2)
2025–	Maejo United	0	(0)
- * Club domestic league appearances and goals as of 18 May 2019

Bright Friday (born 13 December 1998) is a Nigerian footballer who currently plays as a midfielder.

== Career statistics ==
=== Club ===
As of 22 July 2018.

Club	Season	League			Cup		Continental		Other		Total	
Club	Season	Division	Apps	Goals	Apps	Goals	Apps	Goals	Apps	Goals	Apps	Goals
FK Egnatia	2017–18	Albanian First Division	8	0	0	0	–		0	0	8	0
FK Egnatia	2018–19	Albanian First Division	0	0	0	0	–		0	0	0	0
FK Egnatia	Total		8	0	0	0	0	0	0	0	8	0
Shkumbini Peqin (loan)	2017–18	Albanian First Division	14	3	0	0	–		0	0	14	3
Career total			22	3	0	0	0	0	0	0	22	3
