= Santiphap Channgom =

Thai footballer

Personal information
- Full name: Santiphap Channgom
- Date of birth: 23 September 1996 (age 30)
- Place of birth: Surin, Thailand
- Height: 1.75 m (5 ft 9 in)
- Position: Right-back

Team information
- Current team: Chonburi

Youth career
- 2009–2014: Bangkok Christian College

Senior career*
Years	Team	Apps	(Gls)
2015–2019	Police Tero	62	(0)
2017	→ Air Force United (loan)	14	(0)
2020–2025	BG Pathum United	114	(2)
2025–	Chonburi	10	(0)

International career^{‡}
2015	Thailand U19	6	(0)
2016–2017	Thailand U21	4	(0)
2018–2019	Thailand U23	5	(0)
2021–	Thailand	8	(0)
- * Club domestic league appearances and goals as of 07:23, 6 November 2025 (UTC) ‡ National team caps and goals as of 14 October 2025

Santiphap Channgom (also Chan-ngom, Thai: สันติภาพ จันทร์หง่อม, born 23 September 1996) is a Thai professional footballer who plays as a right-back for Thai League 1 club Chonburi and the Thailand national team.

== International career ==
On 12 April 2021, Santiphap was called up for the 2022 World Cup qualification match against Tajikistan. He represented Thailand at the 2023 AFC Asian Cup.

== Honours ==
=== BG Pathum United ===
- Thai League 1 (1): 2020–21
- Thailand Champions Cup (2): 2021, 2022
- Thai League Cup: 2023–24

=== Thailand ===
- King's Cup: 2026
