= Somyot Pongsuwan =

Thai footballer

Somyos Pongsuwan
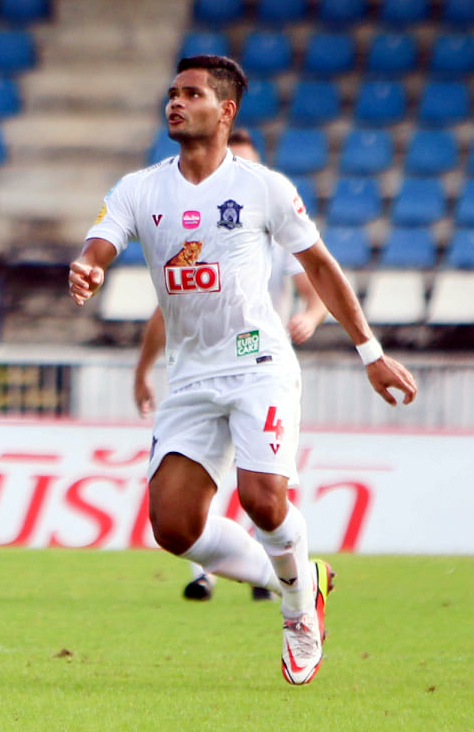

Personal information
- Full name: Somyos Pongsuwan
- Date of birth: 10 September 1993 (age 33)
- Place of birth: Sisaket, Thailand
- Height: 1.73 m (5 ft 8 in)
- Position: Attacking midfielder

Team information
- Current team: Rasisalai United
- Number: 32

Senior career*
Years	Team	Apps	(Gls)
2016–2019	Sisaket	35	(5)
2019	→ Ubon United (loan)		
2020–2022	BG Pathum United	1	(0)
2020	→ Rajpracha (loan)	0	(0)
2021–2022	→ Chiangmai (loan)	38	(2)
2022	Rajpracha	12	(1)
2023	Rasisalai United	10	(4)
2023–2024	Ubon Kruanapat	22	(6)
2024–	Rasisalai United	44	(3)
- * Club domestic league appearances and goals

Somyos Pongsuwan (Thai: สมยศ พงษ์สุวรรณ; born 23 September 1993) is a Thai professional footballer who plays as an attacking midfielder for Thai League 2 club Rasisalai United .

== Honours ==
=== Club ===
Rasisalai United FC

- Thai League 2 : 2025–26
