= Mehti Sarakham =

Thai footballer

Personal information
- Full name: Mehti Sarakham
- Date of birth: 21 May 1999 (age 27)
- Place of birth: Phang Nga, Thailand
- Height: 1.80 m (5 ft 11 in)
- Positions: Forward; winger

Team information
- Current team: Rayong
- Number: 7

Youth career
- 2014–2016: Suankularb Wittayalai School
- 2017: Buriram United

Senior career*
Years	Team	Apps	(Gls)
2018–2019	Buriram United	0	(0)
2018	→ Krabi (loan)	6	(1)
2019	→ Lampang (loan)	15	(0)
2020–2021	Samut Prakan City	0	(0)
2020–2021	→ Rayong (loan)	18	(3)
2021–2023	PT Prachuap	22	(0)
2023	→ Ayutthaya United (loan)	14	(0)
2023	Kasetsart	7	(1)
2023–2025	Lampang	40	(6)
2025–	Rayong	8	(0)

International career^{‡}
2018	Thailand U19	9	(5)
2022	Thailand U23	7	(0)
Medal record
Thailand under-23
Southeast Asian Games
Silver medal – second place	Sea Games 2021	Football
- * Club domestic league appearances and goals as of 9 January 2026 ‡ National team caps and goals as of 19 Mar 2023

Mehti Sarakham (Thai: เมธี สาระคำ, born 21 May 1999) is a Thai professional footballer who plays as a forward for Thai League 1 club Rayong.

== Honours ==
=== International ===
Thailand U-23

- Southeast Asian Games (silver) Silver medal: 2021
