= Pinyo Inpinit =

Thai footballer

Personal information
- Full name: Pinyo Inpinit
- Date of birth: 1 July 1993 (age 33)
- Place of birth: Loei, Thailand
- Height: 1.69 m (5 ft 6 1/2 in)
- Positions: Winger; forward

Youth career
- 2010–2012: Police United

Senior career*
Years	Team	Apps	(Gls)
2013–2016	Police United	54	(9)
2013	→ Look Isan (loan)	22	(7)
2016–2017	Port	1	(0)
2017	→ Prachuap (loan)	4	(0)
2018	Police Tero	6	(0)
2018	Air Force Central	13	(2)
2019–2020	Port	0	(0)
2019–2020	→ Nongbua Pitchaya (loan)	14	(3)
2020	BG Pathum United	0	(0)
2020	→ Rajpracha (loan)	11	(1)
2021–2022	Chiangmai	29	(0)
2022–2023	Rajpracha	10	(1)
2024	Police Tero	4	(0)
2025	Dome	9	(3)
Total		167	(26)

International career
2011–2012	Thailand U19	15	(4)
2013–2016	Thailand U23	19	(7)
2013–2014	Thailand	4	(0)
Medal record
Thailand under-23
SEA Games
Gold medal – first place	Singapore 2015
- * Club domestic league appearances and goals as of 13 July 2024 (UTC)

Pinyo Inpinit (Thai: ภิญโญ อินพินิจ, born July 1, 1993) is a Thai retired professional footballer who played as a Winger.

== International career ==
Pinyo Inpinit playing with Thailand national under-20 football team, he played latest in 2012 AFC U-19 Championship qualification. He debuted for the first team as a substitute against China in 2013. He represented Thailand U23 in the 2014 Asian Games. Pinyo is also part of Thailand's pre-squad in the 2014 AFF Championship. He won the 2015 Southeast Asian Games with Thailand U23.

=== Thailand Selected Team ===
Pinyo was part of Thailand Selected Team which competed in the 2013 Merdeka Tournament.

=== International ===
As of 12 November 2015

National team	Year	Apps	Goals
Thailand	2013	1	0
Thailand	2014	3	0
Thailand	Total	4	0

== International goals ==
=== under-23 ===
Pinyo Inpinit – goals for Thailand U23
#	Date	Venue	Opponent	Score	Result	Competition
1.	18 September 2014	Incheon, South Korea	Timor-Leste	3–0	3–0	2014 Asian Games
2.	22 September 2014	Incheon, South Korea	Indonesia	5–0	6–0	2014 Asian Games
3.	22 March 2015	Bangkok, Thailand	Vietnam	3–0	3–1	Friendly
4.	27 March 2015	Bangkok, Thailand	Cambodia	1–1	2–1	2016 AFC U-23 Championship qualification
5.	29 March 2015	Bangkok, Thailand	Philippines	5–0	5–1	2016 AFC U-23 Championship qualification
6.	15 June 2015	Kallang, Singapore	Myanmar	3–0	3–0	2015 Southeast Asian Games Semi-finals
7.	13 January 2016	Doha, Qatar	Saudi Arabia	1–1	1–1	2016 AFC U-23 Championship

== Honours ==
=== Club ===
International

Thailand U-23

- Sea Games Gold Medal (1); 2015
