= Victor Cardozo =

Brazilian footballer

Personal information
- Full name: Victor Mattos Cardozo
- Date of birth: 19 December 1989 (age 36)
- Place of birth: Sapucaia, Brazil
- Height: 1.94 m (6 ft 4 1/2 in)
- Position: Centre back

Team information
- Current team: Chiangrai United
- Number: 23

Youth career
- 2009: Primeira Camisa

Senior career*
Years	Team	Apps	(Gls)
2010	Cerâmica	5	(0)
2011	America-RJ	4	(0)
2012–2013	Esportivo	14	(7)
2014	Campinense	6	(0)
2014	Operário	6	(1)
2014	Duque de Caxias	7	(0)
2015	São Bento	0	(0)
2015–2017	Ubon UMT United	72	(20)
2018	Chiangrai United	32	(7)
2019	PTT Rayong	28	(3)
2020–2025	BG Pathum United	59	(18)
2022–2023	→ Chiangrai United (loan)	24	(11)
2024–2025	→ Lamphun Warriors (loan)	25	(3)
2025–	Chiangrai United	14	(2)
- * Club domestic league appearances and goals as of 9 January 2026

Victor Mattos Cardozo (born 19 December 1989), simply known as Victor or Victor Cardozo, is a Brazilian footballer who currently plays for Thai League 1 club Chiangrai United.

== Honours ==
Ubon UMT United

- Regional League Division 2: 2015

Chiangrai United

- Thai FA Cup: 2018
- Thai League Cup: 2018
- Thailand Champions Cup: 2018

BG Pathum United

- Thai League 1: 2020–21
- Thailand Champions Cup: 2021
- Thai League Cup: 2023–24

=== Individual ===
- Thai League 1 Best XI: 2020–21
