= Pongrawit Jantawong =

Thai footballer (born 2000)

Personal information
- Full name: Pongrawit Jantawong
- Date of birth: October 7, 2000 (age 26)
- Place of birth: Uthai Thani, Thailand
- Height: 1.71 m (5 ft 7 in)
- Position: Midfielder

Team information
- Current team: BG Pathum United
- Number: 27

Youth career
- 2015–2018: BG Pathum United

Senior career*
Years	Team	Apps	(Gls)
2019–	BG Pathum United	4	(0)
2019	→ Cerezo Osaka U-23 (loan)	8	(1)
2020	→ Rajpracha (loan)	2	(0)
2021	→ Sisaket (loan)	9	(1)
2021–2023	→ Chiangmai (loan)	58	(4)
2023	→ Chiangrai United (loan)	4	(0)
2023–2024	→ Chanthaburi (loan)	17	(2)
2024–2025	→ Chanthaburi (loan)	32	(5)

International career^{‡}
2016	Thailand U16	4	(0)
2021–2022	Thailand U23	2	(0)
- * Club domestic league appearances and goals as of 9 January 2026 ‡ National team caps and goals as of 31 October 2021

Pongrawit Jantawong (Thai: พงศ์รวิช จันทวงษ์; born 7 October 2000) is a Thai footballer currently playing as a midfielder for BG Pathum United.

== Career statistics ==
=== Club ===
As of 31 March 2021.

Club	Season	League			Cup		Continental		Other		Total	
Club	Season	Division	Apps	Goals	Apps	Goals	Apps	Goals	Apps	Goals	Apps	Goals
BG Pathum United	2019	Thai League 2	0	0	0	0	–		0	0	0	0
BG Pathum United	2020–21	Thai League 1	0	0	0	0	–		0	0	0	0
BG Pathum United	Total		0	0	0	0	0	0	0	0	0	0
Cerezo Osaka U-23	2019	J3 League	8	1	–		–		0	0	8	1
Sisaket (loan)	2020–21	Thai League 2	9	1	0	0	–		0	0	9	1
Career total			17	2	0	0	0	0	0	0	17	2
