= Natthaphon Piamplai =

Thai footballer (born 1993)

Personal information
- Full name: Natthaphon Piamplai
- Date of birth: 5 December 1993 (age 32)
- Place of birth: Bangkok, Thailand
- Position: Midfielder

Team information
- Current team: Chanthaburi
- Number: 25

Youth career
- 2012–2016: Muangthong United

Senior career*
Years	Team	Apps	(Gls)
2016	Khon Kaen United	10	(1)
2017	Army United	13	(0)
2018	Police Tero	5	(0)
2019	Kasetsart	15	(2)
2020	Police Tero	4	(0)
2020–2021	Sukhothai	10	(0)
2021	Sisaket	7	(0)
2022	Udon Thani	12	(0)
2022–2024	Kasetsart	58	(3)
2024–	Chanthaburi	0	(0)
- * Club domestic league appearances and goals as of 30 April 2024

Natthaphon Piamplai (Thai: ณัฐพล เปี่ยมพลาย; born December 5, 1993) is a Thai professional footballer who plays as a midfielder for Thai League 2 club Chanthaburi.
