= Tawan Khotrsupho =

Thai footballer

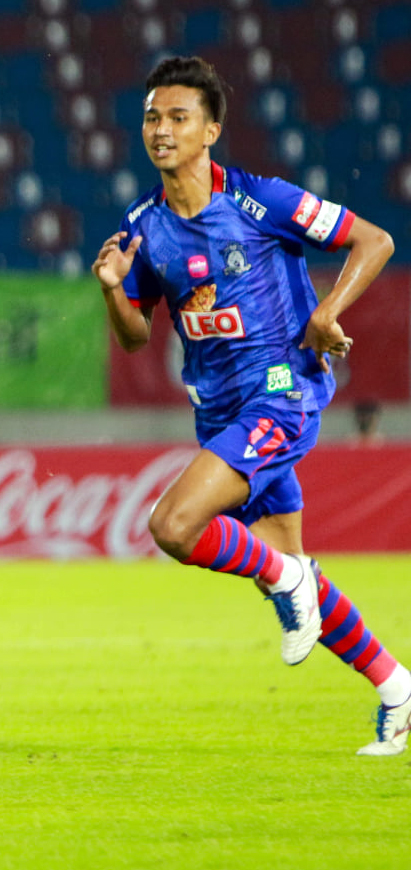
- Tawan Khotrsupho playing for Lamphun Warriors

Personal information
- Full name: Tawan Khotrsupho
- Date of birth: 23 January 2000 (age 26)
- Place of birth: Ubon Ratchathani, Thailand
- Height: 1.74 m (5 ft 9 in)
- Positions: Forward; winger

Team information
- Current team: Lamphun Warriors
- Number: 19

Youth career
- 2015–2018: BG Pathum United

Senior career*
Years	Team	Apps	(Gls)
2019–2024	BG Pathum United	4	(0)
2019–2020	→ Cerezo Osaka U-23 (loan)	25	(0)
2021–2024	→ Chiangmai (loan)	92	(17)
2024–	Lamphun Warriors	16	(2)

International career^{‡}
2021–2023	Thailand U23	3	(0)
- * Club domestic league appearances and goals as of 14 March 2025 ‡ National team caps and goals as of 31 October 2021

Tawan Khotrsupho (Thai: ตะวัน โคตรสุโพธิ์, born 23 January 2000) is a Thai footballer currently playing as a forward or a winger for Lamphun Warriors.

== Career statistics ==
=== Club ===
As of 17 March 2021

Club	Season	League			Cup		Continental		Other		Total	
Club	Season	Division	Apps	Goals	Apps	Goals	Apps	Goals	Apps	Goals	Apps	Goals
BG Pathum United	2019	Thai League 2	0	0	0	0	–		0	0	0	0
BG Pathum United	2020–21	Thai League 1	4	0	0	0	–		0	0	4	0
BG Pathum United	Total		4	0	0	0	0	0	0	0	4	0
Cerezo Osaka U-23 (loan)	2019	J3 League	13	0	–		–		0	0	13	0
Cerezo Osaka U-23 (loan)	2020	J3 League	12	0	–		–		0	0	12	0
Cerezo Osaka U-23 (loan)	Total		25	0	0	0	0	0	0	0	25	0
Career total			29	0	0	0	0	0	0	0	29	0

== Honours ==
BG Pathum United

- Thai League 1
  - Champions (1): 2020–21
