= Tiago Chulapa =

Brazilian footballer

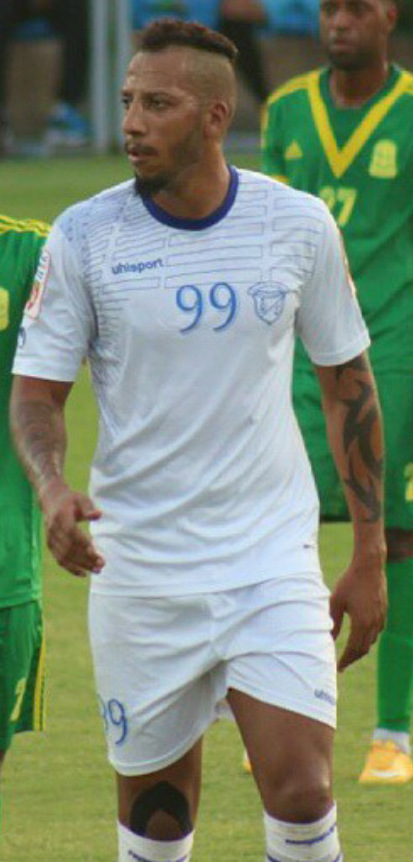
- Chulapa with Sur in 2015

Personal information
- Full name: Tiago Oliveira de Souza
- Date of birth: 5 February 1988 (age 38)
- Place of birth: Curitiba, Brazil
- Height: 1.91 m (6 ft 3 in)
- Position: Forward

Team information
- Current team: Chanthaburi
- Number: 70

Youth career
- 2001: Paraná
- 2001–2002: São Paulo
- 2002–2007: Paraná

Senior career*
Years	Team	Apps	(Gls)
2007–2008	Paraná	0	(0)
2008–2009	Rio Claro	0	(0)
2009	Pato Branco	0	(0)
2009	Juventus	0	(0)
2010	Serrano	0	(0)
2011	Guaçuano	21	(6)
2012	Oeste	3	(1)
2012	Bragantino	3	(1)
2013	Treze	12	(3)
2014	Sorocaba	4	(0)
2014	Cuiabá	3	(1)
2014–2015	Sur	7	(7)
2015–2016	Al-Seeb	3	(1)
2017	Ubon UMT United	16	(3)
2017	Kasetsart	19	(11)
2018	Lampang	1	(1)
2019–2020	Rayong	36	(19)
2020	Nongbua Pitchaya	12	(7)
2021	Police Tero	11	(2)
2021	Lamphun Warrior	0	(0)
2022	Khonkaen	16	(3)
2022	Mahasarakham	11	(3)
2023–2024	Rayong	53	(34)
2024–	Chanthaburi	0	(0)
- * Club domestic league appearances and goals as of 8 March 2024

Tiago Oliveira de Souza (born 5 February 1988), commonly known as Tiago Chulapa, is a Brazilian footballer who plays as a striker.

== Club career ==
=== Youth career ===
Born and raised in Curitiba, Brazil, Tiago began his career as a football player in 2001 with Paraná Clube. In 2001, he moved to Brazilian top club, São Paulo FC. In 2002, he returned to Paraná Clube where he played till he became 19 years old.

=== Early career ===
Tiago began his professional career in Brazil with his parent club, based in his hometown, Curitiba, Paraná Clube in 2007. In his one-year spell at the Curitiba-based club, he helped them achieve the runners-up place in the Campeonato Paranaense. In 2008, he moved to Rio Claro, São Paulo, where he signed a one-year contract with Rio Claro Futebol Clube. He then moved to Pato Branco-based Pato Branco Esporte Clube in 2009 where he helped them win the Campeonato Paranaense Third Level in 2009. In the same year, he moved to Mooca-based Clube Atlético Juventus. In 2010, he moved to Petrópolis-based Serrano Football Club.

=== Guaçuano ===
His next move was in 2011 to Clube Atlético Guaçuano. He made his debut for the Mogi Guaçu-based club on 29 January 2012 in a 2–0 win in a Campeonato Paulista Série A3 match against Marília Atlético Clube and scored his first goal on 5 February 2012 in a 2–2 draw against Esporte Clube São Bento. He scored 6 goals in his 21 appearances for the Mogi Guaçu-based club in the 2012 Campeonato Paulista Série A3.

=== Oeste ===
In 2012, he moved to Itápolis where he signed a one-year contract with Oeste Futebol Clube. He made his debut and scored his first goal for the Itápolis-based club on 30 June 2012 in a 4–1 loss in a Campeonato Brasileiro Série C match against Vila Nova Futebol Clube helping them win the 2012 Campeonato Brasileiro Série C. He scored 1 goal in his 3 appearances in the 2012 Campeonato Brasileiro Série C.

=== Bragantino ===
In the same season, he moved to Bragança Paulista-based Clube Atlético Bragantino. He made his debut for the Bragança Paulista-based club on 19 September 2012 in a 2–0 win in a Campeonato Brasileiro Série B match over América Futebol Clube (MG) and scored his first goal on 29 September 2012 in a 2–1 win over Clube Atlético Paranaense He scored one goal in his 3 appearances for the Bragança Paulista-based club in the 2012 Campeonato Brasileiro Série B.

=== Treze ===
In 2013, he moved to Paraíba-based Treze Futebol Clube. He made his debut for the Paraíba-based club on 18 August 2013 in a 2–0 win over his latter club Cuiabá Esporte Clube and scored his first goal on 26 August 2013 in a 4–2 loss against Sampaio Corrêa Futebol Clube. He scored 3 goals in his 12 appearances for the Paraíba-based club in the 2013 Campeonato Brasileiro Série C.

=== Sorocaba ===
He then moved to Sorocaba in 2014 where he signed a one-year contract with Clube Atlético Sorocaba. He made his debut for the Sorocaba-based club on 19 January 2014 in a 1–0 loss against one of his former clubs, Rio Claro Futebol Clube. He made 4 appearances for the Sorocaba-based club in the 2014 Campeonato Paulista.

=== Cuiabá ===
In the same year, he signed a short-term contract with Cuiabá-based Cuiabá Esporte Clube. He made his debut and scored his first goal for the Cuiabá-based club on 28 April 2014 in a 3–1 win over Clube Recreativo e Atlético Catalano. He also made 2 appearances in the Quarter-finals of the 2014 Copa Verde, one in a 1–0 loss against Brasília FC in the away leg and another in a 0–0 draw in the return leg against the same club. He also made 2 appearances in the First Round of the 2014 Copa do Brasil, one in a 0–0 draw against Barbalha Futebol Clube in the away leg and another in which he also scored a goal in a 2–0 win over the same club in the return leg. The club couldn't progress beyond the Second Round after their 5–2 loss on aggregate to Brazilian top club, Sport Club Internacional. He also helped them win the Campeonato Mato-Grossense in 2014. He scored 2 goal in his 7 appearances for the Cuiabá-based club.

=== Sur ===
He first moved out of Brazil in 2014 to the Middle East and more accurately to Oman. On 25 September 2014, he signed a one-year contract with Oman Professional League club, Sur SC.

=== Al-Seeb ===
On 5 August 2015, he signed a one-year contract with Oman First Division League club, Al-Seeb.

=== Club career statistics ===
Club	Season	Division	League		Cup		Continental		Other		Total	
Club	Season	Division	Apps	Goals	Apps	Goals	Apps	Goals	Apps	Goals	Apps	Goals
Guaçuano	2012	Campeonato Paulista Série A3	21	6	0	0	0	0	0	0	21	6
Guaçuano	Total		21	6	0	0	0	0	0	0	21	6
Oeste	2012	Campeonato Brasileiro Série C	3	1	0	0	0	0	0	0	3	1
Oeste	Total		3	1	0	0	0	0	0	0	3	1
Bragantino	2012	Campeonato Brasileiro Série B	3	1	0	0	0	0	0	0	3	1
Bragantino	Total		3	1	0	0	0	0	0	0	3	1
Treze	2013	Campeonato Brasileiro Série C	12	3	0	0	0	0	0	0	12	3
Treze	Total		12	3	0	0	0	0	0	0	12	3
Sorocaba	2014	Campeonato Paulista	4	0	0	0	0	0	0	0	4	0
Sorocaba	Total		4	0	0	0	0	0	0	0	4	0
Cuiabá	2014	Campeonato Brasileiro Série C	3	1	4	1	0	0	0	0	3	1
Cuiabá	Total		3	1	4	1	0	0	0	0	3	1
Sur	2014–15	Oman Professional League	7	7	8	8	0	0	0	0	15	15
Sur	Total		7	7	8	8	0	0	0	0	15	15
Al-Seeb	2015–16	Oman First Division League	3	1	0	0	0	0	0	0	3	1
Al-Seeb	Total		3	1	0	0	0	0	0	0	3	1
Career total			56	20	14	7	0	0	0	0	68	29

== Honours ==
Paraná

- Campeonato Paranaense runner-up: 2007

Pato Branco

- Campeonato Paranaense Third Level: 2009

Oeste

- Campeonato Brasileiro Série C: 2012

Cuiabá

- Campeonato Mato-Grossense: 2014

Sur

- Sultan Qaboos Cup: runner-up: 2014–15

Individual

- Thai League 2: Top Scorer 2019
