= Suwat Junboonpha =

Thai footballer (born 1992)

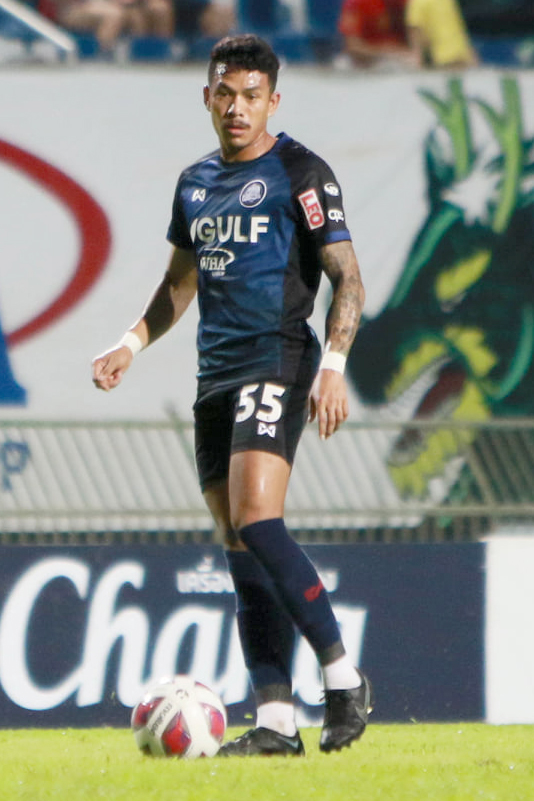
- Suwat Junboonpha playing for Rayong.

Personal information
- Full name: Suwat Junboonpha
- Date of birth: 2 August 1992 (age 34)
- Place of birth: Rayong, Thailand
- Height: 1.83 m (6 ft 0 in)
- Position: Centre-back

Team information
- Current team: Chanthaburi
- Number: 99

Senior career*
| Years | Team | Apps | (Gls) |
| 2019 | Lampang | 28 | (1) |
| 2019–2024 | Rayong | 106 | (2) |
| 2025 | Mahasarakham SBT | 8 | (1) |
| 2025– | Chanthaburi | 14 | (0) |
- * Club domestic league appearances and goals as of 15 April 2026

Suwat Junboonpha (Thai: สุวัฒน์ จันทร์บุญภา; born August 2, 1992) is a Thai professional footballer who plays as a centre-back for Thai League 2 club Chanthaburi.
